= List of state universities in India =

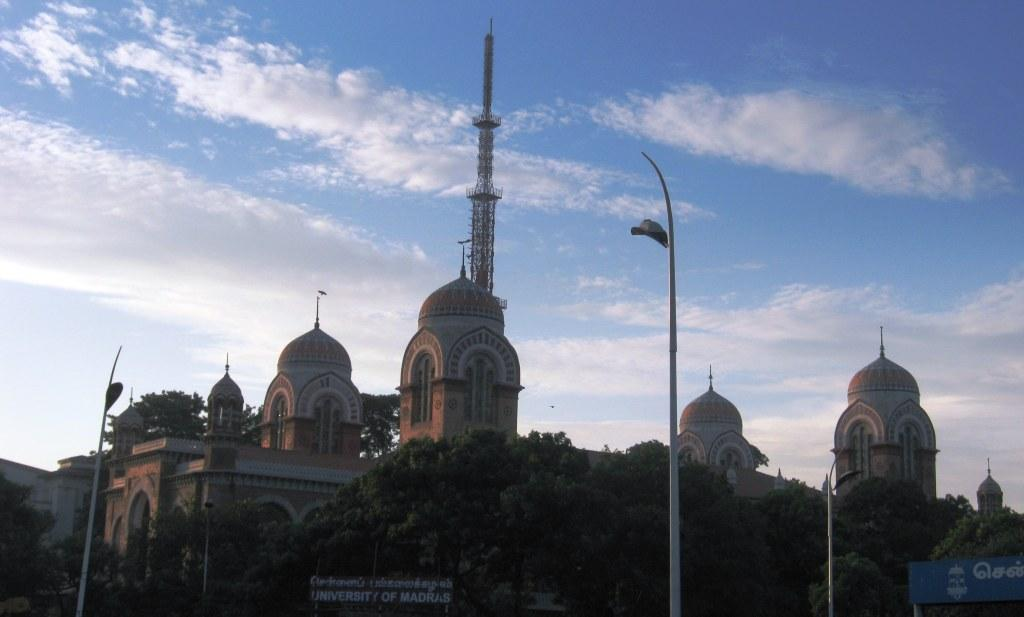
The University of Madras, established 1857, is one of the three oldest state universities in India, the others being the University of Calcutta and the University of Mumbai.

State universities are public universities run by the State Government of each of the states and territories of India, and are usually established by a local legislative assembly act. The University Grants Commission (UGC), draws its power from the University Grants Commission Act, 1956. In addition, 15 Professional Councils are established, controlling different aspects of accreditation and coordination. The UGC publishes and regularly updates the lists of state universities. As of 16 November 2022, the UGC lists 459 active state universities. (Note: The list includes a serial numbering which goes up to 460. However, the list erroneously includes "U.P. King George's University of Dental Science" (#393) which was reabsorbed into King George's Medical University (#381) in 2007.) The oldest establishment date listed by the UGC is 1857, shared by the University of Calcutta, the University of Madras and the University of Mumbai.

Section 12 (B) of the UGC Act of 1956 also grants the UGC the right to "allocate and disburse, out of the Fund of the Commission, grants to Universities..." As such, the UGC categorizes state universities as either "declared fit to receive Central/UGC assistance under Section 12 (B) of the UGC Act–1956", or not, and notes this status at the lists published. Updates to these declarations are done in meetings of the UGC and published in the minutes. The latest list, published by the UGC on 26 September 2022, lists 267 universities as fit to receive Central/UGC assistance.

Other types of universities controlled by the UGC include:

- Central universities, or Union universities are established by Act of Parliament and are under the purview of the Department of Higher Education in the Union Human Resource Development Ministry.
- Deemed university, or "Deemed-to-be-University", is a status of autonomy granted by the Department of Higher Education on the advice of the UGC, under Section 3 of UGC Act, 1956.
- Private universities are approved by the UGC. They can grant degrees but they are not allowed to have off-campus affiliated colleges.

Apart from the above universities, other institutions are granted the permission to autonomously award degrees. These institutes do not affiliate colleges and are not officially called "universities" but "autonomous organizations" or "autonomous institutes". They fall under the administrative control of the Department of Higher Education. These organizations include the Indian Institutes of Technology, the National Institutes of Technology, the Indian Institutes of Science Education and Research, the Indian Institutes of Management (though these award diplomas, not degrees) and other autonomous institutes.

== Universities by state ==
Of the State of India there are state universities in all states except Mizoram and Nagaland. The state with the most state universities in India is Karnataka with 38 universities. Of the union territories, there are state universities in Chandigarh, Delhi, Jammu and Kashmir, Ladakh and Puducherry.

State universities in India by state
State	Fit under Section 12 (B)?		Total universities
State	Yes	No	Total universities
Andhra Pradesh	18	10	28
Arunachal Pradesh	0	1	1
Assam	7	20	27
Bihar	10	11	21
Chandigarh	1	0	1
Chhattisgarh	6	10	16
Delhi	7	4	11
Goa	1	0	1
Gujarat	18	12	30
Haryana	13	8	21
Himachal Pradesh	4	3	7
Jammu and Kashmir	6	3	9
Jharkhand	6	7	13
Karnataka	20	23	43
Kerala	10	5	15
Ladakh	0	1	1
Madhya Pradesh	17	9	26
Maharashtra	19	11	30
Manipur	0	3	3
Meghalaya	0	1	1
Odisha	13	11	24
Puducherry	0	1	1
Punjab	7	7	14
Rajasthan	12	16	28
Sikkim	0	2	2
Tamil Nadu	21	1	22
Telangana	13	6	19
Tripura	1	1	2
Uttar Pradesh	22	20	42
Uttarakhand	5	6	11
West Bengal	22	16	38
Total	279	221	500

== List of universities ==
In the list below, the term "Section 12 (B)?" refers to being "declared fit to receive Central/UGC assistance under Section 12 (B) of the UGC Act–1956". The year of establishment is the year stated by the UGC. Cases where this year is different than the year stated by the university are noted. Differences in title are also noted, except minor typographical errors and "University of X"/"X University" differences.

=== Andhra Pradesh ===
There are 29 state universities in Andhra Pradesh.

University	Location	Section 12 (B)?	Established	Specialization	Sources
Acharya Nagarjuna University	Guntur	Yes	1976	General	
Acharya N. G. Ranga Agricultural University	Guntur	No	1964	Agricultural	
Adikavi Nannaya University	Rajamahendravaram	Yes	2006	General	
Andhra Kesari University	Ongole	No	2022	General	
Andhra Pradesh Fisheries University	Vijayawada	No	2020	Ichthyology	
Andhra University	Visakhapatnam	Yes	1926	General	
Cluster University	Kurnool	No	2019	General	
Damodaram Sanjivayya National Law University	Visakhapatnam	Yes	2008	Legal	
Dr. Abdul Haq Urdu University	Kurnool	No	2016	General and Urdu	
Dr. B. R. Ambedkar University, Srikakulam	Srikakulam	Yes	2008	General	
Dr. B.R Ambedkar Open University	Eluru	No	2026	General	
Dr. NTR University of Health Sciences	Vijayawada	No	1986	Healthcare	
Dr. YSR Architecture and Fine Arts University	Kadapa	No	2020	Architecture and Fine Arts	
Dr. Y.S.R. Horticultural University	Tadepalligudem	No	2011 (Note: Established in 2007 as "Andhra Pradesh Horticultural University". The UGC lists 2011, the year of the act that renamed it.)	Horticulture	
Dravidian University	Kuppam	Yes	1997	Dravidian languages	
Jawaharlal Nehru Technological University, Anantapur	Anantapuram	Yes	1946	Technology	
Jawaharlal Nehru Technological University, Kakinada	Kakinada	Yes	1946	Technology	
Jawaharlal Nehru Technological University - Gurajada, Vizianagaram	Vizianagaram	No	2022	Technology	
Krishna University	Machilipatnam	Yes	2008	General	
Rajiv Gandhi University of Knowledge Technologies, Nuzvid	Nuzvid	Yes	2008	Technology	
Rayalaseema University	Kurnool	Yes	2008	General	
Sri Krishnadevaraya University	Anantapuram	Yes	1981	General	
Sri Padmavati Mahila Visvavidyalayam	Tirupati	Yes	1983	Women's only	
Sri Venkateswara Institute of Medical Sciences	Tirupati	Yes	1993	Medical	
Sri Venkateswara University	Tirupati	Yes	1954	General	
Sri Venkateswara Vedic University	Tirupati	No	2006	Vedic studies	
Sri Venkateswara Veterinary University	Tirupati	No	2005	Veterinary school	
Vikrama Simhapuri University	Nellore	Yes	2008	General	
Yogi Vemana University	Kadapa	Yes	2006	General	

=== Arunachal Pradesh ===
There is one state university in Arunachal Pradesh namely Arunachal Pradesh University (APU) established in 2022 at Pasighat, East Siang District.

=== Assam ===
There are 27 state universities in Assam.

University	Location	Section 12 (B)?	Established	Specialization	Sources
Assam Agricultural University	Jorhat	Yes	1968	Agriculture	
Assam Rajiv Gandhi University of Cooperative Management	Sivasagar	No	2010	Cooperative Management	
Assam Science and Technology University	Jalukbari	No	2011 (Note: The university states an establishment date of 2010 per letter from Governor. The UGC lists 2011.)	Science, technology	
Assam Skill University	Mangaldoi	No	2021	Skill	
Assam Veterinary and Fishery University	Khanapara	No	2024	Veterinary	
Assam Women's University	Jorhat	No	2013	Women's only	
Birangana Sati Sadhani Rajyik Vishwavidyalaya	Golaghat district	No	2021	General	
Bodoland University	Kokrajhar	Yes	2009	General	
Bhattadev University	Pathsala	No	2017	General	
Bongaigaon University	Bongaigaon	No	2023	General	
Cotton University (Note: Listed under the institute's former name, "Cotton College State University".)	Guwahati	Yes	2011	General	
Dibrugarh University	Dibrugarh	Yes	1965	General	
Gauhati University	Guwahati	Yes	1948	General	
Gurucharan University	Silchar	No	2023	General	
Jagannath Barooah University	Jorhat	No	2023	General	
Kokrajhar University	Kokrajhar	No	2024	General	
Krishna Kanta Handiqui State Open University	Guwahati	No	2007	Distance education	
Kumar Bhaskar Varma Sanskrit and Ancient Studies University	Nalbari	Yes	2011	Sanskrit, Ancient studies	
Madhabdev University	Narayanpur	No	2018	General	
Majuli University of Culture	Majuli	No	2019	Cultural Studies	
Nagaon University	Nagaon	No	2023	General	
National Law University and Judicial Academy, Assam	Nalbari	Yes	2009	Legal	
North Lakhimpur University	North Lakhimpur	No	2023	General	
Rabindranath Tagore University, Hojai	Hojai	No	2019	General	
Sibsagar University	Sivasagar	No	2023	General	
Srimanta Sankaradeva University of Health Sciences	Bhangagarh	No	2007 (Note: The university states an establishment date of 2009. The UGC lists 2007, the year of the establishment Act.)	Health sciences	
Sri Sri Aniruddhadeva Sports University	Chabua, Dibrugarh	No	2021	Sports Science	

=== Bihar ===
There are 21 state universities in Bihar.

University	Location	Section 12 (B)?	Established	Specialization	Sources
Aryabhatta Knowledge University	Patna	No	2008 (Note: The university states an establishment date of 2010. The UGC lists 2008, the year of the establishment act.)	Technology	
Babasaheb Bhimrao Ambedkar Bihar University	Muzaffarpur	Yes	1952	General	
Bihar Agricultural University	Bhagalpur	No	2010	Agriculture	
Bihar Animal Sciences University	Patna	No	2018	Animal Science	
Bihar Engineering University	Patna	No	2022	Engineering	
Bihar Sports University	Rajgir	No	2022	Sports	
Bihar University of Health Sciences	Patna	No	2022	Medical	
Bhupendra Narayan Mandal University	Madhepura	Yes	1993	General	
Chanakya National Law University	Patna	Yes	2006	Legal	
Jai Prakash University	Chhapra	Yes	1995	General	
Kameshwar Singh Darbhanga Sanskrit University (Note: Listed by the UGC as "K.S.Darbhanga Sanskrit Vishwavidyalaya")	Darbhanga	Yes	1961	Sanskrit	
Lalit Narayan Mithila University	Darbhanga	Yes	1972	General	
Magadh University	Gaya	Yes	1962	General	
Maulana Mazharul Haque Arabic and Persian University	Patna	No	2004 (Note: The university states 1976 as the year of establishment, per the establishment Act, "with effect from 10 April 1998". The UGC lists 2004.)	Arabic, Persian	
Munger University	Munger	No	2018	General	
Nalanda Open University	Patna	No	1987	Distance education	
Patliputra University	Patna	No	2018	General	
Patna University	Patna	Yes	1917	General	
Purnea University	Purnea	No	2018	General	
Tilka Manjhi Bhagalpur University (Note: Listed by the UGC as "T.M.Bhagalpur University")	Bhagalpur	Yes	1960	General	
Veer Kunwar Singh University	Arrah	Yes	1994	General	

=== Chandigarh ===
There is one state university in Chandigarh.

University	Location	Section 12 (B)?	Established	Specialization	Sources
Panjab University (Note: Listed by the UGC as "Punjab University".)	Chandigarh	Yes	1947 (Note: The university was established in 1882 in Lahore, now in Pakistan. The UGC lists 1947, the year of partition. The university relocated to Chandigarh in 1956.)	General	

=== Chhattisgarh ===
There are 16 state universities in Chhattisgarh.

University	Location	Section 12 (B)?	Established	Specialization	Sources
Atal Bihari Vajpayee Vishwavidyalaya	Bilaspur	Yes	2011 (Note: The university states an establishment date of June 2012. The UGC lists 2011, the year of the establishment Act.)	General	
Chhattisgarh Swami Vivekanand Technical University	Bhilai	No	2004	Technology	
Dau Shri Vasudev Chandrakar Kamdhenu Vishwavidyalaya	Raipur	No	2011 (Note: The university states an establishment date of 11 April 2012. The UGC lists 2011, the year of the establishment Act.)	Veterinary, animal sciences	
Hemchand Yadav Vishwavidyalaya	Durg	No	2015	General	
Hidayatullah National Law University	Raipur	Yes	2003	Legal	
Indira Gandhi Krishi Vishwavidyalaya	Raipur	Yes	1987	Agriculture	
Indira Kala Sangeet Vishwavidyalaya	Khairagarh	Yes	1956	Music	
International Institute of Information Technology, Naya Raipur	Naya Raipur	No	2014	Information Technology	
Kushabhau Thakre Patrakarita Avam Jansanchar Vishwavidyalaya	Raipur	No	2004	Journalism	
Mahatma Gandhi University of Horticulture & Forestry	Durg	No	2020	Horticulture	
Pandit Ravishankar Shukla University	Raipur	Yes	1964	General	
Pandit Sundarlal Sharma (Open) University	Bilaspur	No	2004	Distance education	
Pt. Deendayal Upadhyay Memorial Health Sciences and Ayush University of Chhattisgarh (Note: Listed by the UGC in its former name "Ayush and Health Sciences University of Chhattisgarh".)	Raipur	No	2008	Healthcare	
Sarguja University	Ambikapur	No	2008	General	
Shaheed Mahendra Karma Vishwavidyalaya	Jagdalpur	No	2008	General	
Shaheed Nandkumar Patel University	Raigarh	No	2020	General	

=== Delhi ===
There are eleven state universities in Delhi.

University	Location	Section 12 (B)?	Established	Specialization	Sources
Dr. B.R. Ambedkar University Delhi (Note: Listed under the institute's former name "Bharat Ratna Dr. B. R. Ambedkar University".)	New Delhi	Yes	2007	Social sciences, humanities	
Delhi Pharmaceutical Science and Research University	New Delhi	No	2015 (Note: The university states August 2015 as an establishment date, including on the logo. The UGC lists 2010, the year of the establishment Act.)	Pharmaceutical science	
Delhi Skill and Entrepreneurship University	Delhi	Yes	2020	General	
Delhi Sports University	Delhi	No	2020	Sport	
Delhi Teachers University	Delhi	No	2022	Teachers Training	
Delhi Technological University	Delhi	Yes	2009	Technology	
Guru Gobind Singh Indraprastha University (Note: Listed by the UGC as "Guru Gobind Singh Indraprastha Vishwavidyalaya")	Delhi	Yes	1998	General	
Indira Gandhi Delhi Technical University for Women	Shahjahanabad	Yes	2013	Women's only, technology	
Indraprastha Institute of Information Technology, Delhi	Delhi	No	2008	Information technology	
National Law University, Delhi	Delhi	Yes	2008	Legal	
Netaji Subhas University of Technology	Delhi	Yes	1983	Technology	

=== Goa ===
There is one state university in Goa.

University	Location	Section 12 (B)?	Established	Specialization	Sources
Goa University	Goa	Yes	1985	General	

=== Gujarat ===
There are 30 state universities in Gujarat.

University	Location	Section 12 (B)?	Established	Specialization	Sources
Anand Agricultural University	Anand	No	2004 (Note: Gujarat Agricultural University (GAU) was split in 2004 under that Gujarat Agricultural University Act-2004 into four universities, namely Sardarkrushinagar Dantiwada Agricultural University, Anand Agricultural University, Junagadh Agricultural University and Navsari Agricultural University. The UGC lists the first as "Gujarat Agricultural University, Sardar Krushinagar" with an establishment date of 1972, the date of establishment of GAU. The rest are listed with 2004 as the establishment date.)	Agriculture	
Bhakta Kavi Narsinh Mehta University	Junagadh	No	2015	General	
Birsa Munda Tribal University	Rajpipla	No	2014	General	
Children's University	Gandhinagar	Yes	2009	Children's education	
Dharamsinh Desai University	Nadiad	Yes	2000	General	
Dr. Babasaheb Ambedkar Open University	Ahmedabad	No	1995	Distance education	
Gujarat Biotechnology University	GIFT City	No	2018	Biotechnology	
Gujarat National Law University	Gandhinagar	Yes	2003	Legal	
Gujarat Natural Farming Science University	Panchmahal	No	2017	Agriculture	
Gujarat Technological University	Ahmedabad	Yes	2007	Technology	
Gujarat University	Ahmedabad	Yes	1950	General	
Gujarat University of Transplantation Sciences	Ahmedabad	No	2015	Transplantation sciences	
Hemchandracharya North Gujarat University	Patan	Yes	1986	General	
Indian Institute of Teacher Education	Gandhinagar	Yes	2010	Teacher education	
Institute of Infrastructure Technology Research and Management	Ahmedabad	No	2013	Infrastructure	
Institute of Teaching and Research in Ayurveda	Jamnagar	Yes	1968	Ayurveda	
Junagadh Agricultural University (Note: Listed by the UGC as "Junagarh Agricultural University".)	Junagadh	No	2004	Agriculture	
Kamdhenu University	Gandhinagar	No	2009	Veterinary, Animal sciences	
Kaushalya Skill University	Ahmedabad	No	2021	Skill University	
Krantiguru Shyamji Krishna Verma Kachchh University	Bhuj	Yes	2004	General	
Maharaja Krishnakumarsinhji Bhavnagar University	Bhavnagar	Yes	1978	General	
Maharaja Sayajirao University of Baroda	Vadodara	Yes	1949	General	
Navsari Agricultural University	Navsari	No	2004	Agriculture	
Sardar Patel University	Vallabh Vidhyanagar	Yes	1955	General	
Sardarkrushinagar Dantiwada Agricultural University	Palanpur	Yes	1972	Agriculture	
Saurashtra University	Rajkot	Yes	1955	General	
Shree Somnath Sanskrit University	Veraval	Yes	2005	Sanskrit	
Shri Govind Guru University	Godhra	No	2015	General	
Swarnim Gujarat Sports University	Gandhinagar	No	2011	Physical education	
Veer Narmad South Gujarat University	Surat	Yes	1965	General	

=== Haryana ===
There are 21 state universities in Haryana.

University	Location	Section 12 (B)?	Established	Specialization	Sources
Bhagat Phool Singh Mahila Vishwavidyalaya	Sonipat	Yes	2006	Women's only	
Chaudhary Bansi Lal University	Bhiwani	No	2014	General	
Chaudhary Charan Singh Haryana Agricultural University	Hisar	Yes	1970	Agriculture	
Chaudhary Devi Lal University	Sirsa	Yes	2003	General	
Chaudhary Ranbir Singh University	Jind	Yes	2014	Postgraduate education	
Dada Lakhmi Chand State University of Performing and Visual Arts	Rohtak	No	2014	General	
Dr. B. R. Ambedkar National Law University	Sonipat	No	2012	Legal	
Deenbandhu Chhotu Ram University of Science and Technology (Note: Listed as Deen Bandhu Chhotu Ram University of Science & Technology)	Murthal	Yes	2006	Technology	
Gurugram University	Gurgaon	No	2017	General	
Guru Jambheshwar University of Science and Technology	Hisar	Yes	1995	Science, technology	
Indira Gandhi University Meerpur, Rewari	Rewari	Yes	2013	General	
J.C. Bose University of Science and Technology, YMCA	Faridabad	Yes	2009	Technology	
Kurukshetra University	Kurukshetra	Yes	1956	General	
Lala Lajpat Rai University of Veterinary and Animal Sciences	Hisar	No	2010	Veterinary medicine	
Maharana Pratap Horticultural University	Karnal	No	2016	Horticulture	
Maharshi Dayanand University	Rohtak	Yes	1976	General	
Maharishi Valmiki Sanskrit University	Mundri	No	2018	Sanskrit	.
Pandit Bhagwat Dayal Sharma University of Health Sciences	Rohtak	Yes	2008	Healthcare	
Shri Krishna AYUSH University	Kurukshetra	No	2017	Ayurveda	
Shri Vishwakarma Skill University	Dudhola	No	2016	Skill Development	
Sports University of Haryana	Sonipat	No	2022	Sports	

=== Himachal Pradesh ===
There are seven state universities in Himachal Pradesh.

University	Location	Section 12 (B)?	Established	Specialization	Sources
Atal Medical and Research University	Mandi	No	2017	Medicine	
Chaudhary Sarwan Kumar Himachal Pradesh Krishi Vishvavidyalaya (Note: Listed as "Chaudhary Sarwan Kumar Himachal Pradesh Agriculture University".)	Palampur	Yes	1978	Agriculture	
Dr. Yashwant Singh Parmar University of Horticulture and Forestry (Note: Listed as "Dr. Y. S. Parmar University of Horticulture & Forestry".)	Solan	Yes	1986	Horticulture, forestry	
Himachal Pradesh National Law University	Shimla	No	2016	Legal	
Himachal Pradesh Technical University	Hamirpur	No	2010	Technology	
Himachal Pradesh University	Shimla	Yes	1970	General	
Sardar Patel University	Mandi	No	2022	General	

=== Jammu and Kashmir ===
There are nine state universities in Jammu and Kashmir.

University	Location	Section 12 (B)?	Established	Specialization	Sources
Baba Ghulam Shah Badshah University	Rajauri	Yes	2005	General	
Cluster University of Jammu	Jammu	No	2016	General	
Cluster University of Srinagar	Srinagar	No	2016	General	
Islamic University of Science & Technology	Pulwama	Yes	2005	Science, technology	
Sher-e-Kashmir University of Agricultural Sciences and Technology of Jammu (Note: The Sher-e-Kashmir University of Agricultural Sciences and Technology Act 1982 which established Sher-e-Kashmir University of Agricultural Sciences and Technology was amended in 1999, creating Sher-e-Kashmir University of Agricultural Sciences and Technology of Jammu in Jammu and renaming the institute located in the original location to Sher-e-Kashmir University of Agricultural Sciences and Technology of Kashmir. The UGC lists both universities as "Sher-e-Kashmir University of Agricultural Science & Technology", distinguishable by the location.)	Jammu	No	1999	Agriculture	
Sher-e-Kashmir University of Agricultural Sciences and Technology of Kashmir	Srinagar	Yes	1982	Agriculture	
Shri Mata Vaishno Devi University	Katra	Yes	2004	Science, technology	
University of Jammu	Jammu	Yes	1968	General	
University of Kashmir	Srinagar	Yes	1949	General	

=== Jharkhand ===
There are 14 state universities in Jharkhand.

University	Location	Section 12 (B)?	Established	Specialization	Sources
Binod Bihari Mahto Koyalanchal University	Dhanbad	No	2017	General	
Birsa Agricultural University	Ranchi	Yes	1980	Agriculture	
Dr. Shyama Prasad Mukherjee University	Ranchi	Yes	1926	General	
Jamshedpur Women’s University	Jamshedpur	No	2019 (Note: Under the Jharkhand State University Amendment Act 2017, the college will become the first university for women in Jharkhand.)	General	
Jharkhand Raksha Shakti University	Ranchi	No	2016	Police science, internal security	
Jharkhand University of Technology	Ranchi	No	2011	Technology	
Jharkhand State Open University	Ranchi	No	2021	Distance Education	
Kaushal Vidya Entrepreneurship, Digital and Skill University	Ranchi	No	2022	Skill	
Kolhan University	Chaibasa	No	2007 (Note: The university states 2009 as the year of establishment. The UGC lists 2007.)	General	
National University of Study and Research in Law	Ranchi	Yes	2010	Legal	
Nilamber-Pitamber University	Palamu	No	2007 (Note: The university states 2009 as the year of establishment. The UGC lists 2007.)	General	
Ranchi University	Ranchi	Yes	1960	General	
Sido Kanhu Murmu University (Note: Listed by the former name "Sido Kanhu University")	Dumka	Yes	1992	General	
Vinoba Bhave University	Hazaribagh	Yes	1993	General	

=== Karnataka ===
There are 43 state universities in Karnataka.

University	Location	Section 12 (B)?	Established	Specialization	Sources
Bagalkot University	Jamkhandi	No	2022	General	
Bangalore University	Bengaluru	Yes	1964	General	
Bengaluru City University	Bengaluru	No	2017	General	
Bengaluru North University	Kolar	No	2017	General	
Bidar University	Bidar	No	2023	General	
Chamarajanagara University	Chamarajanagara	No	2023	General	
Davangere University	Davangere	Yes	2009	General	
Dr. B. R. Ambedkar School of Economics University	Bengaluru	No	2017	Economics	
Gulbarga University	Kalaburagi	Yes	1980	General	
Hassan University	Hassan	No	2022	General	
Haveri University	Haveri	No	2022	General	
Kannada University	Hampi	Yes	1992	Kannada	
Karnatak University (Note: Listed by the UGC as "Karnataka University".)	Dharwad	Yes	1949	General	
Karnataka Folklore University (Note: The university is listed twice by the UGC, once as "Karnataka Folklore University" established 2011 and once as "Karnataka Janapada Vishwavidyalaya" established 2012. The university does not use a specific year.)	Shiggaon	No	2011	Folklore	
Karnataka Samskrit University (Note: Listed by the UGC as "Karnataka Sanskrit University".)	Bengaluru	Yes	2011 (Note: The university states an establishment date of 2010. The UGC lists 2011.)	Sanskrit	
Karnataka State Law University	Hubbali	Yes	2009	Legal	
Karnataka State Open University	Mysuru	No	1996	Distance education	
Karnataka State Rural Development and Panchayat Raj University	Gadag	No	2016	Rural development	
Karnataka State Women's University	Bijapur	Yes	2004	Women's only	
Karnataka Veterinary, Animal and Fisheries Sciences University	Bidar	No	2004	Veterinary	
Karnataka State Dr. Gangubhai Hangal Music and Performing Arts University (Note: Listed by the UGC as "KSGH Music and Performing Arts University".)	Mysuru	No	2009	Performing arts	
Keladi Shivappa Nayaka University of Agricultural and Horticultural Sciences	Shimoga	No	2012	Agriculture	
Kodagu University	Kushalnagar	No	2014	General	
Koppal University	Koppal	No	2013	General	
Kuvempu University	Shimoga	Yes	1987	General	
Maharani Cluster University	Bengaluru	No	1986	General	
Mahatma Gandhi Rural Development and Panchayat Raj University	Bengaluru	No	2024	General	
Mandya University	Mandya	No	2019	General	.
Mangalore University	Konaje	Yes	1980	General	
National Law School of India University	Bengaluru	Yes	1986	Legal	
Nrupathunga University	Bengaluru	No	2015	General	
Raichur University	Raichur	No	2021	General	
Rajiv Gandhi University of Health Sciences	Bengaluru	No	1994	Healthcare	
Rani Channamma University, Belagavi	Belagavi	Yes	2010	General	
Tumkur University	Tumakuru	Yes	2004	General	
University of Agricultural Sciences, Bangalore	Bengaluru	Yes	1964	Agricultural sciences	
University of Agricultural Sciences, Dharwad	Dharwad	Yes	1986	Agricultural sciences	
University of Agricultural Sciences, Raichur	Raichur	Yes	2009	Agriculture	
University of Horticultural Sciences, Bagalkot	Bagalkot	No	2010 (Note: The university lists 2008, the date of the Special Ordinance. The UGC list 2010, the year of the Act.)	Horticulture	
University of Mysore	Mysuru	Yes	1916	General	
University of Visvesvaraya College of Engineering	Bengaluru	No	2022	Technology	
Visvesvaraya Technological University	Belagavi	Yes	1999	Technology	
Vijayanagara Sri Krishnadevaraya University	Bellary	No	2010	General	

=== Kerala ===
There are 15 state universities in Kerala.

University	Location	Section 12 (B)?	Established	Specialization	Sources
APJ Abdul Kalam Technological University	Thiruvananthapuram	No	2015 (Note: The university lists 2014 as the year of establishment. The UGC lists 2015, the year of the Act.)	Technology	
Cochin University of Science and Technology	Kochi	Yes	1971	Technology	
Kannur University	Kannur	Yes	1997	General	
Kerala Agricultural University	Thrissur	Yes	1972	Agriculture	
Kerala University of Fisheries and Ocean Studies	Kochi	Yes	2011	Fisheries, oceanography	
Kerala University of Health Sciences	Thrissur	No	2011	Healthcare	
Kerala Veterinary and Animal Sciences University	Wayanad	No	2011	Veterinary, animal sciences	
Mahatma Gandhi University	Kottayam	Yes	1983	General	
National University of Advanced Legal Studies	Kochi	Yes	2009	Legal	
Sree Sankaracharya University of Sanskrit	Kalady	Yes	1994	Sanskrit	
Thunchath Ezhuthachan Malayalam University	Tirur	Yes	2013 (Note: The university lists 2012, the year of the Ordinance. The UGC lists 2013, the year of the Act.)	Malayalam	
University of Calicut	Tenhipalam	Yes	1968	General	
University of Kerala	Thiruvananthapuram	Yes	1937	General	
Sree Narayanaguru Open University	Kollam	No	2020	General	
Kerala University of Digital Sciences, Innovation and Technology	Thiruvananthapuram	No	2020	Engineering, Technology, Humanities	

=== Ladakh ===
There are 1 state universities in Ladakh.

University	Location	Section 12 (B)?	Established	Specialization	Sources
University of Ladakh	Leh	No	2018	General	

=== Madhya Pradesh ===
There are 27 state universities in Madhya Pradesh.

University	Location	Section 12 (B)?	Established	Specialization	Sources
Atal Bihari Vajpayee Hindi Vishwavidyalaya	Bhopal	No	2011	Hindi language	
Awadhesh Pratap Singh University	Rewa	Yes	1968	General	
Barkatullah University	Bhopal	Yes	1970	General	
Devi Ahilya Vishwavidyalaya	Indore	Yes	1964	General	
Dr. B.R. Ambedkar University of Social Sciences	Indore	Yes	2016	Social sciences	
Dharmashastra National Law University	Jabalpur	Yes	2018	Legal	
Jawaharlal Nehru Krishi Vishwa Vidyalaya	Jabalpur	Yes	1964	Agriculture	
Jiwaji University	Gwalior	Yes	1964	General	
Krantisurya Tantya Bhil Vishwavidyalaya	Khargone	No	2024	General	
Krantivir Tatya Tope Vishwavidyalaya	Guna	No	2024	General	
Madhya Pradesh Bhoj Open University (Note: Listed as "M.P.Bhoj (open) University")	Bhopal	Yes	1995	Distance education	
Madhya Pradesh Medical Science University	Jabalpur	No	2011	Medical	
Maharaja Chhatrasal Bundelkhand University (Note: Listed as "Maharaja Chhatrasal Bundelkhand Vishwavidyalaya")	Chhatarpur	No	2011	General	
Maharishi Panini Sanskrit Evam Vedic Vishwavidyalaya	Ujjain	No	2008	Sanskrit, Vedic	
Mahatma Gandhi Chitrakoot Gramoday Vishwavidyalaya	Chitrakoot	Yes	1993	General	
Makhanlal Chaturvedi Rashtriya Patrakarita Avam Sanchar Vishwavidyalaya (Note: Listed as "Makhanlal Chaturvedi Rashtriya Patrakarita National University of Journalism".)	Bhopal	Yes	1991	Journalism, communication	
Nanaji Deshmukh Veterinary Science University (Note: Listed by the former name "Nanaji Deshmukh Pashu Chikitsa Vigyan Vishwavidyalaya".)	Jabalpur	No	2009	Veterinary, fishery	
National Law Institute University	Bhopal	Yes	1998	Legal	
Raja Mansingh Tomar Music & Arts University	Gwalior	Yes	2009 (Note: The university list 2008 as the year it started operating. The UGC lists 2009, the year of the Act.)	Music, fine arts	
Raja Shankar Shah University	Chhindwara	No	2019	General	
Rajiv Gandhi Proudyogiki Vishwavidyalaya	Bhopal	Yes	1998	Technology	
Rajmata Vijayaraje Scindia Krishi Vishwa Vidyalaya	Gwalior	No	2009 (Note: The university list 2008, the year of the Ordinance. The UGC lists 2009, the year of the Act.)	Agriculture	
Rani Awantibai Lodhi Vishwavidyalaya	Sagar	No	2024	General	
Rani Durgavati Vishwavidyalaya	Jabalpur	Yes	1957 (Note: The university lists 1956, the year of the Act. The UGC lists 1957.)	General	
Sanchi University of Buddhist-Indic Studies	Sanchi	Yes	2013	Buddhism	
Pt. Sambhunath University	Shahdol	No	2016	General	
Vikram University	Ujjain	Yes	1957	General	

=== Maharashtra ===
There are 32 state universities in Maharashtra.

University	Location	Section 12 (B)?	Established	Specialization	Sources
COEP Technological University	Pune	No	2022	Technology	
Dr. Babasaheb Ambedkar Marathwada University	Aurangabad	Yes	1958	General	
Dr. Babasaheb Ambedkar Technological University	Lonere	Yes	1989	Technology	
Dr. Balasaheb Sawant Konkan Krishi Vidyapeeth (Note: Listed by the former name, "Konkan Krishi Vidyapeeth".)	Dapoli	Yes	1972	Agriculture	
Dr. Homi Bhabha State University	Mumbai	No	2019	General	
Dr. Panjabrao Deshmukh Krishi Vidyapeeth	Akola	Yes	1969	Agriculture	
Gondwana University	Gadchiroli	No	1994 (Note: The university was officially inaugurated in 2012. The UGC lists 1994, the year of Maharashtra Universities Act, 1994, under which the university was originally established.)	General	
HSNC University	Mumbai	No	2020	General	
International Sports University, Maharashtra	Pune	No	2020	Sports	
Karmaveer Bhaurao Patil University	Satara	No	2016	General	
Kavikulaguru Kalidas Sanskrit University (Note: Listed as "Kavi Kulguru Kalidas Sanskrit Vishwavidyalaya".)	Nagpur	Yes	1997	Sanskrit	
Laxminarayan Innovation Technological University	Nagpur	No	2023	Technology	
Maharashtra Animal and Fishery Sciences University	Nagpur	No	2002	Veterinary, fishery	
Maharashtra National Law University, Aurangabad	Aurangabad	No	2017	Law	
Maharashtra National Law University, Mumbai	Mumbai	No	2014	Law	
Maharashtra National Law University, Nagpur	Nagpur	No	2015 (Note: The university does not state a clear establishment date other than the Act of 2014. The UGC lists 2015.)	Law	
Maharashtra State Skills University	Mumbai	No	2021	Skill Development	
Maharashtra University of Health Sciences	Nashik	No	2000	Healthcare	
Mahatma Phule Krishi Vidyapeeth	Rahuri	Yes	1968	Agriculture	
Marathi Bhasha Vidyapeeth	Amravati	No	2023	Language	
North Maharashtra University	Jalgaon	Yes	1991	General	
Rashtrasant Tukadoji Maharaj Nagpur University	Nagpur	Yes	1923	General	
Sant Gadge Baba Amravati University	Amravati	Yes	1983	General	
Savitribai Phule Pune University	Pune	Yes	1949	General	
Shivaji University	Kolhapur	Yes	1962	General	
SNDT Women's University (Note: Listed by the full name "Shreemati Nathibai Damodar Thackersey Women's University".)	Mumbai	Yes	1951	Women's only	
Swami Ramanand Teerth Marathwada University	Nanded	Yes	1995	General	
University of Mumbai	Mumbai	Yes	1857	General	
University of Solapur	Solapur	Yes	2004	General	
Vasantrao Naik Marathwada Krishi Vidyapeeth (Note: Listed by the former name "Marathwada Agricultural University".)	Parbhani	Yes	1983	Agriculture	
Warana University	Kolhapur	No	2025	General	
Yashwantrao Chavan Maharashtra Open University	Nashik	Yes	1990	Distance education	

=== Manipur ===
There are three state university in Manipur.

University	Location	Section 12 (B)?	Established	Specialization	Sources
Manipur Technical University	Imphal	No	2016	Engineering	
Dhanamanjuri University	Imphal	No	2018	General	
Manipur University of Culture	Imphal	No	2015	General	

=== Meghalaya ===
There are two state university in Meghalaya.

University	Location	Section 12 (B)?	Established	Specialization	Sources
Captain Williamson Sangma State University (CWSSU)	West Garo Hills district	No	2024	General	
The National Law University of Meghalaya	Shillong	No	2022	Legal	

=== Odisha ===
There are 26 state universities in Odisha.

University	Location	Section 12 (B)?	Established	Specialization	Sources
Berhampur University	Berhampur	Yes	1967	General	
Biju Patnaik University of Technology	Rourkela	No	2003	Technology	
Dharanidhar University	Kendujhar	No	2023	General	
Fakir Mohan University	Balasore	Yes	1999	General	
Gangadhar Meher University	Sambalpur	No	2015	General	
International Institute of Information Technology, Bhubaneswar	Bhubaneswar	No	2006	Technology	
Maa Manikeshwari University	Bhawanipatna	No	2020	General	
Khallikote Unitary University	Berhampur	No	2015	General	
Madhusudan Law University	Cuttack	No	2021	Law	
National Law University Odisha	Cuttack	Yes	2009	Legal	
Maharaja Sriram Chandra Bhanja Deo University	Baripada	Yes	1998	General	
Odisha State Open University	Sambalpur	No	2015	Distance Education	
Odisha University of Agriculture and Technology	Bhubaneswar	Yes	1962	Agriculture	
Odisha University of Health Sciences	Bhubaneshwar	No	2023	Medicine	
Odisha University of Technology and Research	Bhubaneswar	No	2021	Technology	
Odia University	Sakhigopal	No	2023	Odia Language	
Rajendra University	Balangir	No	2020	General	
Rama Devi Women's University	Bhubaneswar	No	2015	Women's only	
Ravenshaw University	Cuttack	Yes	2005 (Note: The university states an establishment date of 1868, the year it was established as a college in 1868. The UGC lists 2005, the year it was granted state university status.)	General	
Sambalpur University	Sambalpur	Yes	1967	General	
Shree Jagannath Sanskrit University	Puri	Yes	1981	Sanskrit, vedic studies	
Utkal University	Bhubaneswar	Yes	1943	General	
Utkal University of Culture	Bhubaneswar	No	1999	Culture studies	
Veer Surendra Sai University of Technology	Sambalpur	Yes	2008 (Note: The university states 1956 as an establishment date, the year in which it was established as a college. The UGC states 2008, the year it was granted state university status.)	Technology	
Veer Surendra Sai Institute of Medical Sciences and Research	Sambalpur	Yes	1959	Medicine	
Vikram Dev University	Jeypore	No	2023	General	

=== Puducherry ===
There is one state universities in Puducherry, the Puducherry Technological University.

=== Punjab ===
There are 14 state universities in Punjab.

University	Location	Section 12 (B)?	Established	Specialization	Sources
Baba Farid University of Health Sciences	Faridkot	Yes	2002 (Note: The university states 1998 as an establishment date. The UGC states 2002.)	Healthcare	
Guru Angad Dev Veterinary and Animal Sciences University	Ludhiana	Yes	2005	Veterinary	
Guru Nanak Dev University	Amritsar	Yes	1969	General	
Guru Ravidas Ayurved University	Hoshiarpur	No	2010 (Note: The university states 2011 as the year it started functioning. The UGC lists 2010, the year of the Act.)	Ayurveda	
I. K. Gujral Punjab Technical University	Jalandhar	No	1998	Technology	
Jagat Guru Nanak Dev Punjab State Open University	Patiala	No	2019	Distance Education	
Maharaja Ranjit Singh Punjab Technical University	Bathinda	Yes	2015	Technology	
Punjab Agricultural University	Ludhiana	Yes	1962	Agriculture	
Punjab Sports University	Patiala	No	2019	Sports	
Punjabi University	Patiala	Yes	1962	General	
Rajiv Gandhi National University of Law	Patiala	Yes	2006	Legal	
Sardar Beant Singh State University	Gurdaspur	No	1995	General	
Shaheed Bhagat Singh State University	Ferozepur	No	2021	General	
Sri Guru Teg Bahadur State University of Law	Tarn Taran district	No	2020	Legal	

=== Rajasthan ===
There are 31 state universities in Rajasthan.

University	Location	Section 12 (B)?	Established	Specialization	Sources
Agriculture University, Jodhpur	Jodhpur	No	2013	Agriculture	
Agriculture University, Kota	Kota	No	2013	Agriculture	
Baba Amte Divyang University	Jaipur	No	2023	General	
Bikaner Technical University	Bikaner	No	2017	Technology	
Dr. Bhimrao Ambedkar Law University	Jaipur	No	2019	Legal	
Dr. Sarvepalli Radhakrishnan Rajasthan Ayurved University (Note: List by a variant of its former name "Rajasthan Ayurveda University".)	Jodhpur	No	2004	Ayurveda	
Govind Guru Tribal University	Banswara	No	2012	General	
Haridev Joshi University of Journalism and Mass Communication	Jaipur	No	2012	Journalism	
Jagadguru Ramanandacharya Rajasthan Sanskrit University	Jaipur	Yes	1998	Sanskrit	
Jai Narain Vyas University	Jodhpur	Yes	1962	General	
M.B.M. University	Jodhpur	No	2021	General	
Maharaja Ganga Singh University	Bikaner	Yes	2003	General	
Maharaja Surajmal Brij University, Bharatpur	Bharatpur	No	2012	General	
Maharana Pratap University of Agriculture and Technology	Udaipur	No	2000	Agriculture	
Maharshi Dayanand Saraswati University	Ajmer	Yes	1987	General	
Mahatma Gandhi Divyang University	Jodhpur	No	2023	General	
Marwar Medical University	Jodhpur	No	2023	Medicine	
Mohanlal Sukhadia University	Udaipur	Yes	1962	General	
National Law University, Jodhpur	Jodhpur	Yes	2004	Legal	
Pandit Deendayal Upadhyaya Shekhawati University (Note: Listed by its former name "Shekhawati University".)	Katrathal	No	2012	General	
Raj Rishi Bhartrihari Matsya University	Alwar	No	2012	General	
Rajasthan Technical University	Kota	No	2006	Technology	
Rajasthan University of Health Sciences	Jaipur	Yes	2005	Healthcare	
Rajasthan University of Veterinary and Animal Sciences	Bikaner	No	2010	Veterinary science	
Sardar Patel University of Police, Security and Criminal Justice	Jodhpur	No	2012	Police science	
Sri Karan Narendra Agriculture University	Jobner	No	2013	Agriculture	
Swami Keshwanand Rajasthan Agricultural University (Note: Listed by its former name "Rajasthan Agricultural University".)	Bikaner	Yes	1987	Agriculture	
University of Kota	Kota	Yes	2003	General	
University of Rajasthan	Jaipur	Yes	1947	General	
Vardhaman Mahaveer Open University	Kota	Yes	1987	Distance education	
Vishvakarma Skills University, Jaipur	Jaipur	No	2023	Skill Development	

=== Sikkim ===
There are two state universities in Sikkim

University	Location	Section 12 (B)?	Established	Specialization	Sources
Khangchendzonga State University	Gangtok	No	2018	General	
Sikkim National Law University	Gangtok	No	2023	Legal	

=== Tamil Nadu ===
There are 22 state universities in Tamil Nadu.

University	Location	Section 12 (B)?	Established	Specialization	Sources
Alagappa University	Karaikudi	Yes	1985	General	
Anna University	Chennai	Yes	1978 (Note: Anna University lists 1978 as the establishment year, which is the year of its original establishment act. The UGC lists 2006, the year of the Anna University (Amendment) Act, 2006.)	Technology	
Annamalai University	Chidambaram	Yes	1929	General	
Bharathiar University	Coimbatore	Yes	1982	General	
Bharathidasan University	Tiruchirappalli	Yes	1982	General	
Madurai Kamaraj University	Madurai	Yes	1965	General	
Manonmaniam Sundaranar University	Tirunelveli	Yes	1992	General	
Mother Teresa Women's University	Kodaikanal	Yes	1984	Women's only	
Periyar University	Salem	Yes	1998	General	
Tamil Nadu Agricultural University	Coimbatore	Yes	1971	Agriculture	
Tamil Nadu Dr. J. Jayalalithaa Fisheries University	Nagapattinam	Yes	2012	fishery	
Tamil Nadu National Law University	Tiruchirappalli	Yes	2012	Law	
Tamil Nadu Open University	Chennai	Yes	2004	Distance education	
Tamil Nadu Physical Education and Sports University	Chennai	No	2005	Sports, physical education	
Tamil Nadu Teachers Education University	Chennai	No	2008	Teacher education	
Tamil Nadu Veterinary and Animal Sciences University	Chennai	Yes	1990	Veterinary science	
Tamil University	Thanjavur	Yes	1981	Tamil	
The Tamil Nadu Dr. Ambedkar Law University	Chennai	Yes	1998	Legal	
The Tamil Nadu Dr. J. Jayalalithaa Music and Fine Arts University	Chennai	No	2013	Fine arts	
The Tamil Nadu Dr. M.G.R. Medical University	Chennai	Yes	1989	Medical	
Thiruvalluvar University	Vellore	Yes	2003	General	
University of Madras	Chennai	Yes	1857	General	

=== Telangana ===
There are 19 state universities in Telangana.

University	Location	Section 12 (B)?	Established	Specialization	Sources
Dr. B.R. Ambedkar Open University	Hyderabad	Yes	1982	Distance education	
Jawaharlal Nehru Architecture and Fine Arts University	Hyderabad	Yes	2008 (Note: Following the Jawaharlal Nehru Technological Universities Act, 2008 Jawaharlal Nehru Technological University was split into four universities, Jawaharlal Nehru Architecture and Fine Arts University, Jawaharlal Nehru Technological University, Anantapur, Jawaharlal Nehru Technological University, Kakinada and Jawaharlal Nehru Technological University, Hyderabad. The UGC lists 2008 as the year of establishment for the former three while listing 1972, the year of establishment of the Jawaharlal Nehru Technological University, through The Jawaharlal Nehru Technological University Act, 1972 for Jawaharlal Nehru Technological University, Hyderabad.)	Architecture, fine arts	
Jawaharlal Nehru Technological University, Hyderabad	Hyderabad	Yes	1972	Technology	
Kakatiya University	Warangal	Yes	1976	General	
Kaloji Narayana Rao University of Health Sciences	Warangal	Yes	2014	Medicine	
Mahatma Gandhi University, Nalgonda	Nalgonda	Yes	2007	General	
Nalsar University of Law	Hyderabad	Yes	1999	Legal	
Nizam's Institute of Medical Sciences	Hyderabad	No	1989	Medical	
Osmania University	Hyderabad	Yes	1918	General	
Palamuru University	Mahabubnagar	Yes	2008	General	
Suravaram Pratap Reddy Telugu University	Hyderabad	Yes	1985	Telugu	
Professor Jayashankar Telangana State Agricultural University	Rajendranagar	Yes	2014	Agriculture	
P. V. Narasimha Rao Telangana Veterinary University	Rajendranagar mandal	Yes	2014	Agricultural	
Rajiv Gandhi University of Knowledge Technologies	Basar	Yes	2008	Technology	
Satavahana University	Karimnagar	Yes	2008	General	
Sri Konda Laxman Telangana State Horticultural University	Rajendranagar	No	2014	Horticulture	
Telangana University	Nizamabad	Yes	2006	General	
Veeranari Chakali Ilamma Women's University	Hyderabad	No	2022	General	
Young India Skills University	Hyderabad	No	2024	Skill	

=== Tripura ===
There are 2 state universities in Tripura.

University	Location	Section 12 (B)?	Established	Specialization	Sources
Maharaja Bir Bikram University	Agartala	No	2015	General	
National Law University, Tripura	Agartala	No	2022	Legal	

=== Uttar Pradesh ===
There are 44 state universities in Uttar Pradesh.

University	Location	Section 12 (B)?	Established	Specialization	Sources
Acharya Narendra Deva University of Agriculture and Technology	Ayodhya	Yes	1975	Agriculture	
Atal Bihari Vajpayee Medical University	Lucknow	No	2020	Medical	
Banda University of Agriculture and Technology	Banda	No	2010	Agriculture	
Bhatkhande Sanskriti Vishwavidyalaya	Lucknow	No	2022	Arts	
Bundelkhand University	Jhansi	Yes	1975	General	
Chandra Shekhar Azad University of Agriculture and Technology	Kanpur	Yes	1974	Agriculture	
Chaudhary Charan Singh University	Meerut	Yes	1965	General	
Chhatrapati Shahu Ji Maharaj University (Note: Listed as "Chatrapati Sahuji Maharaj Kanpur University".)	Kanpur	Yes	1965	General	
Deen Dayal Upadhyay Gorakhpur University	Gorakhpur	Yes	1957	General	
Dr. A.P.J. Abdul Kalam Technical University (Note: Listed by its former name "Uttar Pradesh Technical University".)	Lucknow	Yes	2001	Technology, Management	
Dr. Bhimrao Ambedkar University	Agra	Yes	1927	General	
Dr. Ram Manohar Lohia Avadh University	Faizabad	Yes	1975	General	
Dr. Ram Manohar Lohiya National Law University	Lucknow	Yes	2005	Legal	
Dr. Ram Manohar Lohia Institute of Medical Sciences	Lucknow	No	2006	Medical	
Dr. Rajendra Prasad National Law University	Prayagraj	No	2024	Legal	
Dr. Shakuntala Misra National Rehabilitation University (Note: Listed as "Uttar Pradesh Viklang Uddhar Dr. Shakuntala Misra University".)	Lucknow	Yes	2008	Disabled	
Gautam Buddha University	Greater Noida	Yes	2002	General	
Guru Jambheshwar University	Moradabad	No	2024	General	
Harcourt Butler Technical University	Kanpur	No	2016	Technical	
Jagadguru Rambhadracharya Divyanga University	Chitrakoot	Yes		General	
Jananayak Chandrashekhar University	Ballia	No	2016	General	
Kashi Naresh University	Bhadohi	No	2025	General	
Khwaja Moinuddin Chishti Urdu, Arabi-Pharsi University	Lucknow	Yes	2010	Urdu, Arabic, Persian	
King George's Medical University	Lucknow	Yes	2004	Medicine	
Maa Pateswari University	Balrampur	No	2025	General	
Maa Shakumbhari University	Saharanpur	No	2022	General	
Maa Vindhyavasini University	Mirzapur	No	2025	General	
Major Dhyanchand Sports University	Meerut	No	2025	Sports	
M. J. P. Rohilkhand University	Bareilly	Yes	1975	General	
Madan Mohan Malaviya University of Technology	Gorakhpur	Yes	2013	Technology	
Mahatma Gandhi Kashi Vidyapith	Varanasi	Yes	1974	General	
Maharaja Suhel Dev University	Azamgarh	No	2019	General	
Narendra Deva University of Agriculture and Technology	Faizabad	Yes	1974	Agriculture	
Prof. Rajendra Singh (Rajju Bhaiya) University	Allahabad	No	2016	General	
Raja Mahendra Pratap Singh State University	Aligarh	No	2021	General	
Sampurnanand Sanskrit Vishwavidyalaya	Varanasi	Yes	1958	Sanskrit	
Sardar Vallabhbhai Patel University of Agriculture and Technology	Meerut	No	2004	Agriculture	
Siddharth University	Siddharth Nagar	No	2015	General	
Swami Shukdevanand University	Shahjahanpur	No	2025	General	
U.P. Pt. Deen Dayal Upadhyaya Veterinary Science University and Cattle Research Institute	Mathura	No	2001	Veterinary	
University of Lucknow	Lucknow	Yes	1920	General	
Uttar Pradesh Rajarshi Tandon Open University	Allahabad	No	2004	Distance education	
Uttar Pradesh University of Medical Sciences	Saifai, Etawah	No	2016	Medical Sciences	
Veer Bahadur Singh Purvanchal University	Jaunpur	Yes	1987	General	

=== Uttarakhand ===
There are 12 state universities in Uttarakhand.

University	Location	Section 12 (B)?	Established	Specialization	Sources
Doon University	Dehradun	Yes	2005 (Note: While the UGC lists 2005, which is the year of the Act, the university only started operating in 2009.)	General	
G. B. Pant University of Agriculture and Technology	Pantnagar	Yes	1960	Agriculture, technology	
Hemwati Nandan Bahuguna Uttarakhand Medical Education University (Note: Listed by the name of the act "Hemwati Nandan Bahuguna Medical Education University".)	Dehradun	No	2014	Medical education	
Kumaun University	Nainital	Yes	1973	General	
Soban Singh Jeena University	Almora	No	2020	General	
Sri Dev Suman Uttarakhand University (Note: Listed as "Sri Dev Suman Uttarakhand Vishwavidyala".)	Chamba	No	2011 (Note: The university lists 2012. The UGC lists 2011, the date of the original Act.)	General	
Uttarakhand Ayurved University	Dehradun	No	2009	Ayurveda	
Uttarakhand Open University	Haldwani	No	2005	Distance education	
Uttarakhand Sanskrit University	Haridwar	Yes	2005	Sanskrit	
Uttarakhand State Sports University	Haldwani	No	2025	Sports	
Veer Chandra Singh Garhwali Uttarakhand University of Horticulture & Forestry	Bharsar	No	2011	Horticulture, forestry	
Veer Madho Singh Bhandari Uttarakhand Technical University	Dehradun	No	2005	Technology	

=== West Bengal ===
There are 38 state universities in West Bengal.

University	Location	Section 12 (B)?	Established	Specialization	Sources
Aliah University	Kolkata	Yes	1780	General, Technology	
Alipurduar University	Alipurduar	No	2020	General	
Baba Saheb Ambedkar Education University	Kolkata	No	2015	Teacher training	
Bankura University	Bankura	No	2014	General	
Bengal Engineering and Science University, Shibpur	Shibpur	No	1856	STEM	
Bidhan Chandra Krishi Viswavidyalaya	Haringhata	Yes	1974	Agriculture	
Biswa Bangla Biswabidyalay	Bolpur	No	2020	General	
Cooch Behar Panchanan Barma University	Cooch Behar	No	2012	General	
Dakshin Dinajpur University	Balurghat	No	2018	General	
Darjeeling Hills University	Darjeeling	No	2022	General	
Diamond Harbour Women's University	Diamond Harbour	Yes	2013	Women only	
Jadavpur University	Kolkata	Yes	1906	General, Technology	
Harichand Guruchand University	North 24 Parganas district	No	2019	General	
Hindi University	Howrah	No	2019	Hindi Language	
Kanyashree University	Krishnanagar	No	2020	Women only	
Kazi Nazrul University	Asansol	Yes	2012	General	
Mahatma Gandhi University, West Bengal	Mahishadal, Purba Medinipur	No	2020	General	
Maulana Abul Kalam Azad University of Technology (Note: Listed by its former name "West Bengal University of Technology".)	Kolkata	Yes	2001	Technology	
Murshidabad University	Murshidabad	No	2018	General	
Netaji Subhas Open University	Kolkata	No	1997	Distance education	
Presidency University	Kolkata	Yes	2010	General	
Rabindra Bharati University	Kolkata	Yes	1962	General	
Raiganj University	Raiganj	Yes	2015	General	
Rani Rashmoni Green University	Tarakeshwar	No	2020	General	
Sadhu Ram Chand Murmu University of Jhargram	Jhargram	No	2017	General	
Sidho Kanho Birsha University	Purulia	Yes	2010	General	
The Sanskrit College and University	Kolkata	No	2016 (Note: The university lists either 1824, the establishment or the college, or 2015, the year of the Act. UGC lists 2016, the year the university started functioning.)	Sanskrit, Hinduism	
University of Burdwan	Bardhaman	Yes	1960	General	
University of Calcutta	Kolkata	Yes	1857	General	
University of Gour Banga	Malda	Yes	2007	General	
University of Kalyani	Kalyani	Yes	1960	General	
University of North Bengal	Siliguri	Yes	1962	General	
Uttar Banga Krishi Viswavidyalaya	Cooch Behar	No	2001	Agriculture	
Vidyasagar University	Medinipur	Yes	1981	General	
West Bengal State University	Barasat	Yes	2007	General	
West Bengal National University of Juridical Sciences	Kolkata	Yes	2004	Legal	
West Bengal University of Animal and Fishery Sciences	Kolkata	Yes	1995	Veterinary science	
West Bengal University of Health Sciences	Kolkata	Yes	2002	Medical	

== See also ==
- List of universities in India
- List of central universities in India
- List of deemed universities in India
- List of private universities in India
- List of autonomous higher education institutes in India
