= Unified University and College Management System =

Government agency of Karnataka

UUCMS overview
- Formed: 23 August 2021
- Jurisdiction: Karnataka
- Minister responsible: Minister of Higher Education, Karnataka
- Website: Official website

Unified University and College Management System (UUCMS) is a flagship project initiated by the Department of Higher Education, Government of Karnataka in India. It is the first system of its kind in the country. The state universities and autonomous institutions of Karnataka provide marks cards on DigiLocker using UUCMS.

The UUCMS will centralize and streamline the activities of Higher Education Institutions. It will handle admissions, examinations, degree awarding, class monitoring, lesson plans, and student attendance. Additionally, the system will manage faculty, including performance assessment and promotions.

The UUCMS is a joint effort between the Centre for Smart Governance, Government of Karnataka's Department of E-Governance, and the State Project Monitoring Unit under the Department of Higher Education. The SPMU is responsible for overseeing the project's progress and ensuring that all stakeholders remain connected during the development of UUCMS.

== Universities ==
- Bagalkot University
- Bangalore University
- Bengaluru City University
- Bengaluru North University
- Dr. B. R. Ambedkar School of Economics University
- Bidar University
- Chamarajanagara University
- Davangere University
- Gulbarga University
- Hassan University
- Haveri University
- Kannada University
- Karnatak University
- Karnataka Janapada Vishwavidyalaya
- Karnataka Samskrit University
- Karnataka State Akkamahadevi Women's University
- Karnataka State Dr. Gangubhai Hangal Music and Performing Arts University
- Karnataka State Open University
- Kodagu University
- Koppal University
- Kuvempu University
- Maharani Cluster University
- Mandya University
- Mangalore University
- Nrupathunga University
- Raichur University
- Rani Channamma University
- St. Joseph University
- Tumkur University
- University of Mysore
- Vijayanagara Sri Krishnadevaraya University
- Visvesvaraya Technological University
