= List of distance education universities in India =

This is a list of notable universities in India offering distance education.

== Andhra Pradesh ==
- Acharya Nagarjuna University, Guntur
- Andhra University, Visakhapatnam
- Dravidian University, Kuppam
- Gitam University, Visakhapatnam
- National Sanskrit University Tirupati
- Sri Padmavati Mahila Visvavidyalayam, Tirupati
- Sri Venkateswara University, Tirupati

== Arunachal Pradesh ==
- Rajiv Gandhi University, Itanagar
- Venkateshwara Open University, Itanagar

== Assam ==
- Assam Down Town University, Guwahati
- Assam University, Silchar
- Dibrugarh University, Dibrugarh
- Guwahati University, Guwahati
- Krishna Kanta Handique State Open University, Guwahati
- Tezpur University, Tezpur

== Bihar ==
- Babasaheb Bhim Rao Ambedkar Bihar University, Muzaffarpur
- Lalit Narayan Mithila University, Darbhanga
- Magadh University, Bodh Gaya
- Nalanda Open University, Patna
- Patna University, Patna

== Chhattisgarh ==
- Dr. CV Raman University, Bilaspur
- MATS University, Raipur
- Pandit Sundarlal Sharma (Open) University, Bilaspur
- Pt. Ravi Shankar Shukla University, Raipur

== Delhi ==
- Delhi University, Delhi
- Guru Gobind Singh Indraprastha University, Delhi
- Indira Gandhi National Open University, Delhi
- Institute of Management and Development, New Delhi
- Jamia Hamdard, New Delhi
- Jamia Milia Islamia, New Delhi

== Gujarat ==
- Gujarat Vidyapith, Ahmedabad
- Saurashtra University Rajkot
- Sabarmati University Ahmedabad

== Haryana ==
- Chaudhary Devilal University, Sirsa
- Guru Jambheshwar University, Hisar
- Kurukshetra University, Kurukshetra
- Maharishi Dayanand University, Rohtak
- Manav Rachna International University, Faridabad

== Himachal Pradesh ==
- Himachal Pradesh University, Shimla

== Jharkand ==
- Jharkhand State Open University, Ranchi

== Karnataka ==
- Bangalore University, Bangalore
- Gulbarga University, Gulbarga
- Kannada University, Hampi
- Karnataka State Open University - Mukthagangotri, Mysuru, karnataka
- Karnataka State Women's University, Bijapur
- Karnataka University, Dharwad
- Kuvempu University, Shimoga
- Mangalore University, Mangalore
- National Law School of India University, Bangalore
- Tumkur University, Tumkur
- Visvesvaraya Technological University, Belgaum

== Kerala ==
- Kannur University, Kannur
- Mahatma Gandhi University, Kottayam
- Sree Narayanaguru Open University, Kollam
- University of Calicut, Kozhikode
- University of Kerala, Thiruvananthapuram

== Madhya Pradesh ==
- Devi Ahilya Vishwavidyalaya, Indore
- Dr Harisingh Gour V V, Sagar
- Jiwaji University, Gwalior
- Maharishi Mahesh Yogi Vedic Vishwavidyalaya, Katni
- Rani Durgawati University, Jabalpur

== Maharashtra ==
- Bharati Vidyapeeth University, Pune
- International Institute for Population Sciences, Mumbai
- Mahatma Gandhi Antarrashtriya Hindi Vishwavidyalaya, Wardha
- Narsee Monjee Institute of Management Studies, Mumbai
- Sant Gadge Baba Amravati University, Amravati
- Swami Ramanand Teerth Marathwada University, Nanded
- Tata Institute of Social Sciences, Mumbai
- University of Mumbai, Mumbai
- Yashwantrao Chavan Maharashtra Open University, Nashik

== Meghalaya ==
- Mahatma Gandhi University, Khana Para
- NEHU, Shillong

== Mizoram ==
- ICFAI, Aizawl

== Odisha ==
- Asian School of Business Management, Bhubaneshwar
- Berhampur University, Berhampur
- Fakir Mohan University, Balasore
- North Orissa University, Mayurbhanj
- Odisha State Open University, Sambalpur
- Sambalpur University, Sambalpur
- Utkal University, Bhubaneswar

== Puducherry ==
- Pondicherry University, Pondicherry

== Punjab ==
- Chandigarh University
- Desh Bhagat University, Fatehgarh Sahib
- Guru Nanak Dev University, Amritsar
- Lovely Professional University, Phagwara
- Panjab University, Chandigarh
- Punjab Technical University, Jalandhar
- Punjabi University, Patiala
- Thapar Institute of Engineering and Technology

== Rajasthan ==
- Bhagwant University, Ajmer
- Birla Institute of Technology and Science, Pilani
- Institute of Advance Studies in Education, Sardarshar
- Jain Vishva Bharati Institute, Ladnun
- Jaipur National University, Jaipur
- NIMS University, Jaipur
- Suresh Gyan Vihar University, Jaipur
- Vardhman Mahaveer Open University, Kota

== Sikkim ==
- ICFAI University, Gangtok
- Sikkim Manipal University, Gangtok

== Tamil Nadu ==
- Annamalai University, Chidambaram
- Bharath Institute of Higher Education and Research, Chennai
- Bharathiar University, Coimbatore
- Bharathidasan University, Tiruchirapalli
- Gandhigram Rural Institute, Gandhigram
- Karpagam University, Coimbatore
- Madurai Kamaraj University, Madurai
- Manonmaniam Sundaranar University, Tirunelveli
- Meenakshi Academy of Higher Education and Research
- Mother Teresa Women's University, Kodaikanal
- Periyar Maniammai University, Thanjavur
- Periyar University, Salem
- Shanmugha Arts Science, Technology & Research Academy, Thanjavur
- Sri Chandrasekharendra Saraswathi Viswamahavidyalaya, Kanchipuram
- St. Peter's University, Chennai
- Tamil Nadu Agricultural University, Coimbatore
- Tamil Nadu Dr. Ambedkar Law University, Chennai
- Tamil Nadu Open University, Chennai
- Tamil University, Thanjavur
- University of Madras, Chennai
- Vinayaka Mission's Research Foundation, Salem

== Telangana ==
- Dr. B.R. Ambedkar Open University, Hyderabad
- Jawaharlal Nehru Technological University, Hyderabad
- Kakatiya University, Warangal
- Maulana Azad National Urdu University, Hyderabad
- NALSAR University of Law, Hyderabad
- National Institute of Rural Development, Hyderabad
- Osmania University, Hyderabad
- Suravaram Pratap Reddy Telugu University, Hyderabad

== Tripura ==
- ICFAI University, Agartala
- Tripura University, Agartala

== Uttar Pradesh ==
- Aligarh Muslim University, Aligarh
- Amity University, Noida
- Integral University, Lucknow
- Jagadguru Rambhadracharya Divyanga University, Chitrakoot
- Mangalayatan University, Aligarh
- Swami Vivekananda Subharti University, Meerut
- Teerthankar Mahaveer University, Moradabad
- University of Allahabad, Allahabad

== Uttarakhand ==
- Dev Sanskriti Vishwavidyalaya, Haridwar
- Gurukul Kangri University, Haridwar
- Jigyasa University, Dehradun
- Kumaun University, Nainital
- Uttarakhand Open University, Haldwani

== West Bengal ==
- Jadavpur University, Kolkata
- Netaji Subhas Open University, Kolkata
- Rabindra Bharati University, Kolkata
- Sidho Kanho Birsha University, Purulia
- University of Burdwan, Burdwan
- University of Kalyani, Kalyani
- University of North Bengal, Darjeeling
- Vidyasagar University, Midnapore
