= MPUAT =

MPUAT may refer to:

- Maharana Pratap University of Agriculture and Technology
- College of Technology & Engineering, Udaipur
