= College of Fisheries, Raha =

Educational institute in India

Coordinates: 26.2164°N 92.5028°E

- মীন মহাবিদ্যালয়, ৰহা
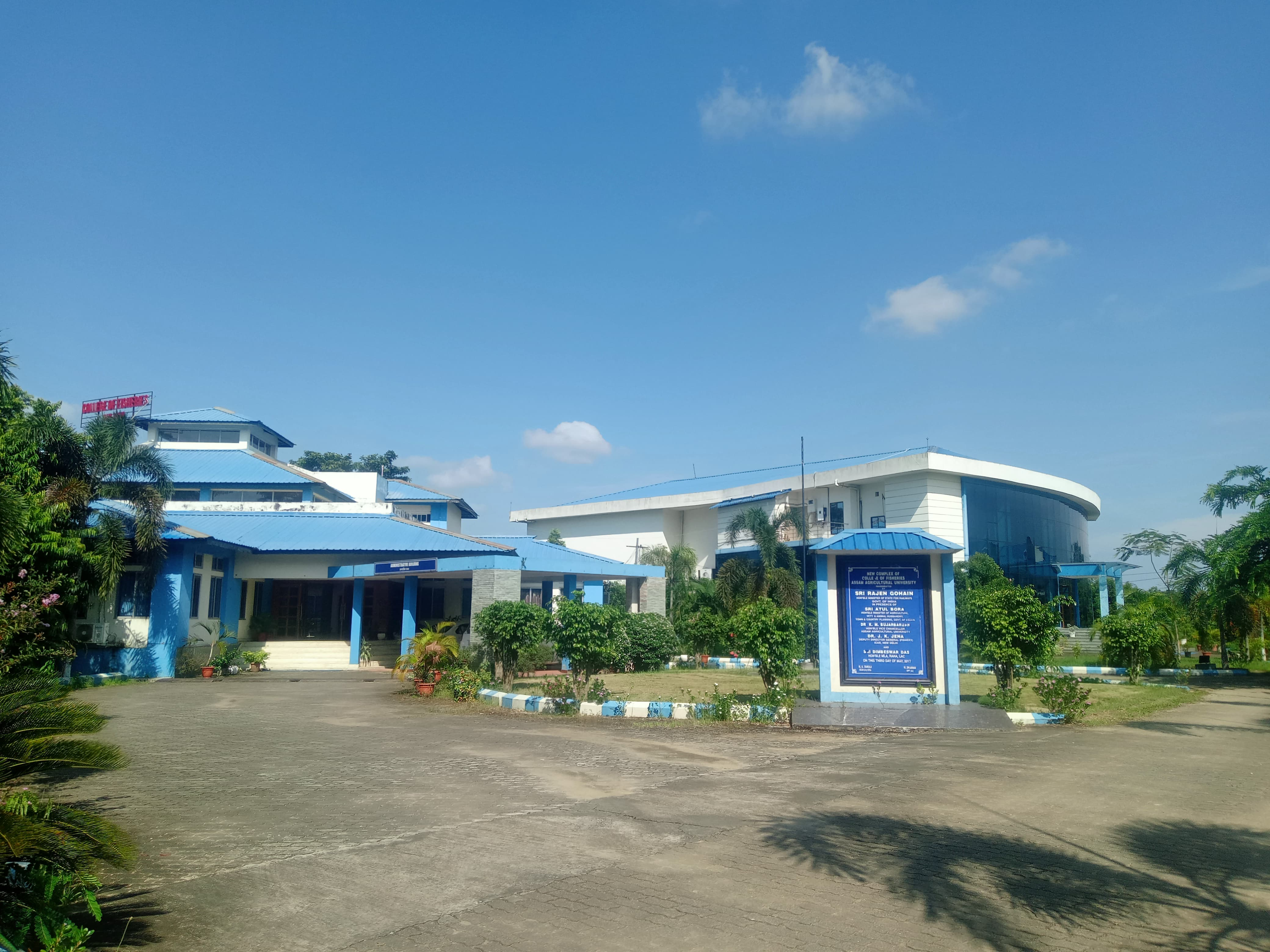
- Type: Public
- Established: 1987
- Affiliations: Assam Veterinary and Fishery University (de jure); Assam Agricultural University (de facto)
- Location: Raha, Nagaon district, Assam, India
- Campus: Rural
- Website: https://cofaau.org/

College of Fisheries, Raha (COF) is an academic institution located at Raha, Assam. It was established in 1988 to offer specialized education in fisheries science, aiming to provide technical expertise in this field, particularly in the context of the North Eastern region of India.

== History ==
The plan to start a fisheries science program at Assam Agricultural University began after discussions in the 1982 ICAR Region II Committee Meeting. A proposal for the College of Fisheries was approved in 1985, with a 70:30 funding ratio from ICAR and the Assam Government. The University established the College at Raha, starting development of academic and hostel units, along with office spaces.

The ICAR Accreditation Committee proposed starting the academic program at the Faculty of Veterinary Science, Khanapara, but the Government of Assam recommended moving it to Raha. The College began its academic program in 1987-88 with the appointment of three lecturers, managed by an Officer on Special Duty. Part-time teachers were also hired to cover supportive subjects such as language, economics, and chemistry. The 4-year B.F.Sc. program also started that year to meet the need for technical manpower in the North Eastern region.

== Academics ==
The college provides undergraduate (B.F.Sc.) and postgraduate (M.F.Sc.) programs in fisheries science. The B.F.Sc. program lasts 4 years and features In-Plant Training (20 credits) in the 7th semester and Hands-on Training (20 credits) in the 8th semester.

== Project and workshops ==
- The Department of Aquaculture at the College of Fisheries, AAU, Raha, held a day-long training program on sustainable aquaculture for Fishery Demonstrators from Karbi Anglong, Assam, and fish farmers from Kiphire district, Nagaland, at Kolong Kapili fishery. They also released 2,000 fingerlings of Cirrhinus reba, or Lashim Bhangon, at the ICAR-CIFA recognized aquaculture field school in Bagibari.
- NABARD has partnered with the College of Fisheries, Raha, to implement Biofloc Fish Farming (BFF) units in Nagaon district, aiming to enhance skill development and capacity building among local youth and fish farmers. Two operational BFF units have been established—one at the college and another at Gramsri Krishak Sangha, focusing on cultivating various fish species.
- On February 22, 27 students from St. John College's Zoology Department, accompanied by two lecturers and a lab assistant, visited the College of Fisheries, AAU, Raha, to enhance their knowledge of fish culture and pond management as part of their "Introduction to Aquaculture" syllabus.
- A 5-member delegation from Tuskegee University, USA, visited the College of Fisheries, Raha, to explore Assam's fish industry and introduce advanced fish-processing techniques under the Agricultural Innovation Partnership (AIP).

== Representative bodies ==
- College of Fisheries Students Union (COFSU).
