= Sri Karan Narendra College of Agriculture =

Shri Karan Narendra College of Agriculture, also SKN College of Agriculture, is a college located in Jobner, Rajasthan, India. It is the first institute for agriculture education to be established in Rajasthan. It is a constituent college of Sri Karan Narendra Agriculture University.

== History ==
Late Rawal Karan Singh of Jobner was inspired by Swami Dayanand Saraswati and established Anglo-Vedic High School in the year 1893. His son Rawal Narendra Singh upgraded the school to Shri Karan Narendra College of Agriculture in the year of Indian independence, July 1947. At the time of creation this was the only institute devoted to agricultural education in the state of Rajasthan in India. At present it has 15 departments and offer B.Sc.(Ag.) Hons, M.Sc.(Ag.) in 11 and Ph.D. in 8 subjects. The faculty is 100 strong and the non-teaching faculty is 400 strong. The student enrollment is about 400.

== Ranking and List of Agricultural Universities ==
The Indian Council of Agricultural Research (Education Division) had released the ranking of agricultural universities of the country for the year 2020. In the released list of colleges, the college figured at the 54th position. The list was populated by names of some very prominent agricultural colleges appearing in the top slots namely 'ICAR-National Dairy Research Institute- Karnal', 'ICAR- Indian Agricultural Research Institute- New Delhi', 'GB Pant University of Agriculture and Technology- Pantnagar', 'Punjab Agricultural University- Ludhiana' and likewise. The college remained in news in the same year for its new technique which helped a Rajasthan village (in near vicinity of college) to meet its water demand through implementation of project for recharging groundwater.

== Admission Procedure ==
Degrees Offered : B.Sc. (Ag.) Hons, M.Sc. (Ag.), Ph.D.

B.Sc. (Ag.) Hons

Admission to B.Sc. (Ag.) Hons Part-I is done through Joint Entrance Test (JET) conducted either by the Rajasthan Agricultural University, Bikaner or Maharana Pratap University of Agriculture and Technology, Udaipur. The minimum eligibility for a candidate to appear in the JET is that the candidate must have passed 12th of the 10+2 (Academic) scheme of examination with Agriculture/Science groups.

== Teaching ==
The college imparts training in basic at UG level as well as scientific skills, by PG level (M.Sc.(Ag.), Ph.D.) with a view to prepare a student career directly and indirectly concerned with the upliftment of agricultural community.

Departments

Name of Departments	Name of Departments	Name of Departments
Department of Agronomy	Department of Agricultural Chemistry & Soil Science	Department of Plant Breeding & Genetics
Department of Plant Pathology	Department of Agricultural Zoology & Entomology	Department of Horticulture
Department of Extension Education	Department of Agricultural Economics	Department of Plant Physiology
Department of Animal Production	Department of Biochemistry	Department of Nematology
Department of Dairy Science	Department of Agricultural Engineering & Physics	Department of Statistics

== The First Batch ==
The S. K. N College's very first batch, that had enrolled in this first agriculture college of state in the July, 1947 and they became the part of remembrance in the history of the college, always were as;
