= Music schools in India =

Music education is considered an important section of the Indian education sector. However, due to the lack of interest by students, as well as economics, music education is a poor section of the education sector in India. This affects different music genres to different degrees. For example, the classical music genre in particular lags behind due to the aforementioned reasons of low student interest. Despite this, music schools can be a lucrative business in India. This is because they can be started with minimum investment and low risk.

== Universities and colleges ==
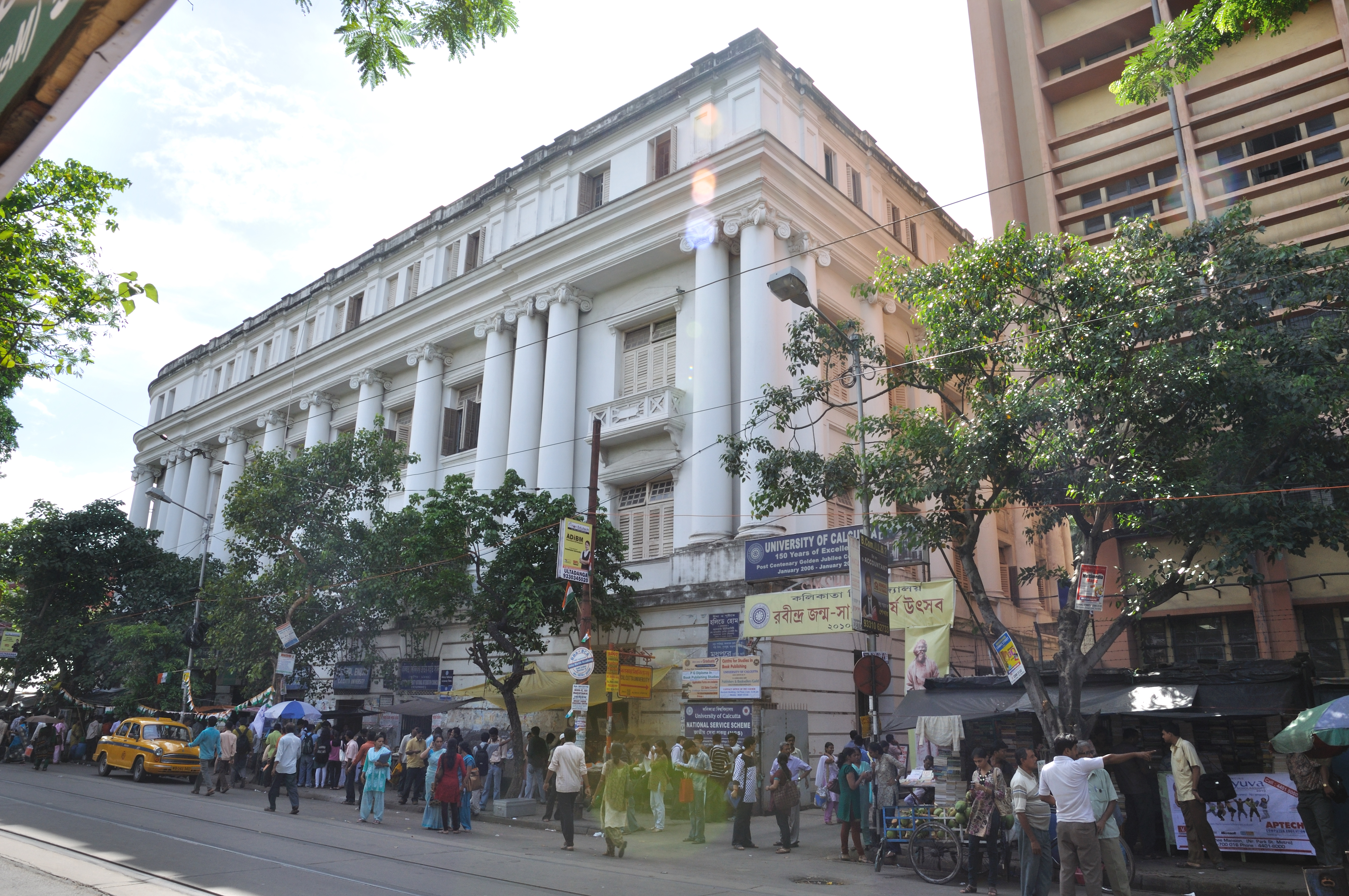
University of Calcutta

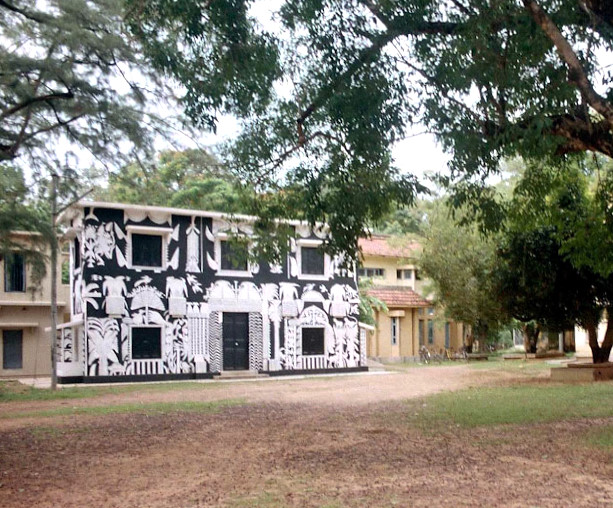
Kala Bhavan, Visva-Bharati University, Santiniketan

Notable universities and colleges of music in India are :

- Raja Mansingh Tomar Music and Arts University, Gwalior
- Prayag Sangeet Samiti, Allahabad
- Indira Kala Sangeet University in Chhattisgarh
- University of Calcutta, which offers a faculty department in music
- University of Delhi – which offers a competitive post-graduation degree in music and a Doctor of Philosophy in Music.
- University of Madras in Chennai
- Visva-Bharati University in Santiniketan

== See also ==
- List of university and college schools of music
- Music education
- Music of India
