= Dr. Shyama Prasad Mukherjee University =

State university in Ranchi, Jharkhand, India

- University Logo
- Other name: DSPMU
- Type: Public State University
- Established: 1926; 100 years ago (as Ranchi College); 2017; 9 years ago (as DSPMU)
- Accreditation: NAAC
- Affiliations: UGC
- Chancellor: Governor of Jharkhand
- Vice-Chancellor: Professor Rajiv Manohar
- Academic staff: 120
- Administrative staff: 240
- Undergraduates: 6,000+
- Postgraduates: 2,500+
- Doctoral students: 1,346+
- Location: Ranchi, Jharkhand, India; 23.3883°N 85.3224°E
- Campus: Urban
- Website: www.dspmuranchi.ac.in

Dr. Shyama Prasad Mukherjee University, formerly Ranchi College (1926-2017), is a state university located in Ranchi, Jharkhand, India. It is named after the Indian politician Shyama Prasad Mukherjee. It was established as a college in 1926 and upgraded to a university in 2017.

== History ==
Ranchi College was established as a government intermediate college in 1926, and begun undergraduate and postgraduate courses in 1946. Following the Indian independence it operated as unit of Patna University. It became a unit of Ranchi University upon its creation in 1960 and became autonomous in 2009. In 2017 it was upgraded to a state university through the Jharkhand State Universities (Amendment) Act, 2017.

== Courses ==
Dr. Shyama Prasad Mukherjee University offers various courses in many streams

- Doctor of Philosophy (PHD) - This University offers 20 courses in PHD
- Master of Science (MSC)
- Bachelor of Science (BSC)
- Master of Business Administration (MBA)
- Bachelor of Commerce (BCOM)
- Bachelor of Education (B.ED) And many more courses in various disciplines.

== See also ==
- Education in India
- List of state universities in India
- List of institutions of higher education in Jharkhand
- University Grants Commission (India)
