= Government First Grade College, Raichur =

Government college in Karnataka state, India

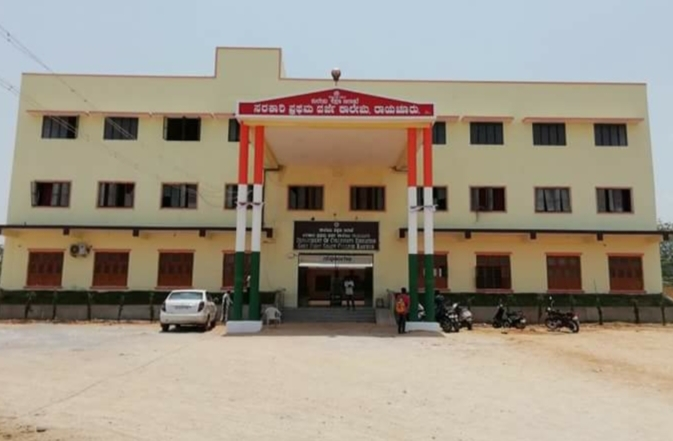
- Type: Public
- Established: 2006
- Academic affiliations: Raichur University
- Location: Raichur, India
- Campus: Urban
- Website: https://gfgc.kar.nic.in/raichur/Contact-Us

Government First Grade College, Raichur is a general degree college located at Raichur, Karnataka, India. It was established in 2006. The college affiliated with Raichur University. This college offers different courses in arts, science and commerce.

== Departments ==
=== Science ===
- Physics
- Chemistry
- Mathematics
- Computer Science

=== Arts and Commerce ===
- Kannada
- English
- History
- Political Science
- Sociology
- Economics
- Business Administration
- Commerce
