= Kamdhenu University =

Agricultural state university in Gujarat, India

Coordinates: 23.2138°N 72.6524°E

- Type: Public
- Established: 2009; 17 years ago
- Affiliations: UGC
- Chancellor: Governor of Gujarat
- Vice-Chancellor: Dr. P. H. Tank
- Location: Gandhinagar, Gujarat, India
- Website: www.kamdhenuuni.edu.in

Kamdhenu University is a public agricultural state university located at Gandhinagar, Gujarat, India. It was established in 2009 by the Kamdhenu University Act, 2009 of the Government of Gujarat. It focuses on veterinary, dairy, fisheries and allied sciences.

== History ==
The first proposal for a veterinary university in Gujarat, with focus on dairy production, was made by Verghese Kurien in 1984 while he served as the Vice-Chancellor of Gujarat Agricultural University, but the proposal was ignored when he resigned from that position. A second offer was promulgated by the Government of Gujarat in 1996–97, but no action was taken. The university was finally established by the Kamdhenu University Act, 2009, with the support of Narendra Modi, then the Chief Minister of Gujarat. However, the university only started functioning in 2014, when M. C. Varshneya was appointed its first Vice-Chancellor (VC).

While the university was created in order to focus on veterinary and animal sciences in general, it was assigned only two colleges, both for dairy sciences. In 2017, this led to formal requests for transferring veterinary and fishery science colleges from other universities in the state. This move would was also necessary for getting Indian Council of Agricultural Research (ICAR) accreditation. However, the request met strong opposition from the other universities' VCs and even led to suggestions to dissolve the university. In 2018, N. H. Kelawala was appointed VC of the university. In September 2020, a bill was passed by Gujarat government to transfer 11 colleges to the university.
