= Hassan Raghu =

Indian stunt director and martial arts practitioner

- Born: January 18, 1954 (age 72); India
- Occupations: Stunt director, martial artist
- Years active: 1978–present
- Organization: Centre for Indigenous Folk Martial Arts
- Known for: Stunt direction, traditional martial arts
- Awards: Padma Shri (2025); Karnataka Rajyotsava Award (2017)

Hassan Raghu (born 18 January 1954), also known as K. H. Raghu, is an Indian stunt director and practitioner of traditional martial arts. He began working in the film industry in 1978 and has worked in South Indian cinema. He is the founder and director of the Centre for Indigenous Folk Martial Arts in Ramanagara, Karnataka. In 2025, he received the Padma Shri in the field of art.

== Career ==
He served in the Indian Army's artillery division and received the Sangram Medal for his service during the Indo-Pakistani War of 1971. After his military service, he worked as a physical instructor at the Army School of Physical Training in Pune and received gymnastics instruction through the National Institute of Sports.

Raghu began working as a stuntman in 1978 and became an action director by 1980. He has choreographed action sequences for over 150 South Indian films. He established a training institute for stunt artists and has trained personnel for the film, television, and theatre industries.

He has served as visiting faculty at the National School of Drama in New Delhi, Bengaluru and Varanasi since 1994. He organised the Akhila Bharath Shourya Kala Mahotsava (Shourya Parva), which began in 2011, and the Akhila Bharatha Loka Kala and Adivasi Kala Festival, held between 2018 and 2020.

Raghu established several institutions focused on traditional martial arts and folk practices, including the Karnataka Sahasa Kala Academy, Sahasa Kala Shikshana Kendra, Janapada Guru Kula, Adventurous Sports Hostel in Ramanagara, Rashtriya Shouryakla Mahavidhalya, Research Development Centre for Indigenous Martial Arts and Rural Games, and Ancient Martial Arts Study Centre. Raghu has served as a board member of the Cine Workers Welfare Fund Committee. He was a founding secretary of the All Karnataka Cine Stunt Directors and Association, a founding vice-president of Karnataka Film Workers, and a founding general secretary of Karnataka Film and TV Technicians.

Raghu served on the Expert Committee for Folk and Indigenous Art under the Ministry of Culture and as project director for an intangible cultural heritage research project under the Sangeet Natak Akademi. He was also a member of the Karnataka Janapada Academy and chaired the Board of Studies for Indigenous Martial Art at Karnataka Folklore University.

== Filmography ==
Selected filmography
Year	Film	Credit
1980	Jari Bidda Jana	Stunts
1980	Mithuna	Stunts
1981	Ranganayaki	Stunts
1981	Mareyada Haadu	Stunts
1981	Bhagyada Belaku	Stunts
1983	Simhasana	Stunts
1983	Dampathiyaru	Stunts
1984	Shiva Kanye	Stunts
1984	Runa Mukthalu	Stunts
1984	Aasha Kirana	Stunts
1984	Amrutha Ghalige	Stunts
1984	Accident	Stunts
1985	Nyayada Kannu	Stunts
1985	Masanada Hoovu	Stunts
1986	Lancha Lancha Lancha	Stunts
1986	Mouna Geethe	Stunts
1986	Maneye Manthralaya	Stunts
1987	Thayi	Stunts
1987	Manasa Veene	Stunts, actor
1988	Ladies Hostel	Stunts
1988	Oorigitta Kolli	Stunts
1989	Sankranthi	Stunts
1989	Abhimana	Stunts
1991	Preethiye Nanna Daiva	Stunts
1994	Mahashakthi Maye	Stunts
1998	One Man Army	Associate director
2000	Indra Dhanush	Actor

== Awards and recognition ==
Hassan Raghu received the Sangram Medal for his service during the Indo-Pakistani War of 1971. The Government of Karnataka honoured him for his stunt direction in the Kannada film Accident in 1986. In 2017, he received the Karnataka Rajyotsava Award from the Government of Karnataka. In 2018, he was given the Janapada Lokasri Award by the Karnataka Janapada Parishath. In 2025, the Government of India awarded him the Padma Shri in the field of art.

In December 2024, he received an honorary doctorate from Karnataka Folklore University in Haveri, Karnataka. In December 2025, he received the Nypunya Gaurava award at Nypunyothsava, organised by Nypunya School of Excellence in Mysuru.
