= Assam Agricultural University =

Agricultural university in Jorhat, Assam, India

- Motto: विज्ञानं लोकसेवारतम (Vijñānam lōkasēvāratama)
- Type: State university
- Established: 1 April 1969; 57 years ago
- Affiliations: Indian Council of Agricultural Research
- Chancellor: Governor of Assam
- Vice-Chancellor: Dr. Dipjyoti Rajkhowa
- Location: Jorhat, Assam, India; 26.723°N 94.196°E
- Campus: Urban
- Acronym: AAU
- Website: www.aau.ac.in

Assam Agricultural University (AAU) is an agricultural education state university which was established on 1 April 1969 in Jorhat in the state of Assam, India. The jurisdiction of the university extends to the entire state of Assam with regard to teaching, research and extension education in the field of agriculture and allied sciences. The university has a number of campuses, with its headquarters at Borbheta, Jorhat.

== Colleges ==
After the Assam Assembly passed the Veterinary And Fishery University Bill, the government decided to form a new university by merging the existing veterinary colleges in the state and the fishery college at Raha. This new university will consist of five Krishi Vigyan Kendra's viz., Kamrup, Barpeta, Baksa, North Lakhimpur and Morigaon under it and the two research stations viz., Mandira and Byrnihat.

The university has faculties and colleges all over Assam:

- College of Agriculture, Jorhat
- College of Community Science, Jorhat
- Biswanath College of Agriculture, Biswanath Chariali
- Sarat Chandra Sinha College of Agriculture, Rangamati, Dhubri
- Lakhimpur College of Veterinary Science, North Lakhimpur (now under the newly established Assam Veterinary and Fishery University)
- College of Horticulture and Farming System Research, Nalbari
- College of Sericulture, Titabor (Currently functioning at Assam Agricultural University's Jorhat campus)

Previously, the below colleges were also part of AAU:

- College of Veterinary Science, Khanapara (now under the newly established Assam Veterinary and Fishery University)
- College of Fishery Science, Raha (now under the newly established Assam Veterinary and Fishery University)

== Research stations ==
The university has six Regional Agricultural Research Stations in each agricultural zone of Assam at:

- Titabar - Upper Brahmaputra Valley Zone
- North Lakhimpur - North Bank Plain Zone (now under the newly established Assam Veterinary and Fishery University)
- Shillongoni - Central Brahmaputra Valley Zone
- Diphu - Hill Zone
- Gossaigaon - Lower Brahmaputra Valley Zone
- Karimganj - Barak Valley Zone

The university also has five Commodity Research Stations at:

- Citrus Research Station, Tinsukia
- Sugarcane Research Station, Buralikson
- Horticulture Research Station, Kahikuchi
- Goat Research Station, Burnihut (now under the newly established Assam Veterinary and Fishery University)
- Poultry Research Station, Mandira (now under the newly established Assam Veterinary and Fishery University)

The university also has established 23 Krishi Vigyan Kendras (out of which 5 KVS of Barpeta, Baksa, Kamrup, North Lakhimpur and Morigaon are now under the newly established Assam Veterinary and Fishery University) for extension purpose in all the districts of Assam.

== Departments ==
Departments under the university's faculties are:

=== Faculty of Agriculture ===
- Agronomy
- Agroforestry
- Agricultural Biotechnology
- Agricultural Economics & Farm management
- Agricultural Engineering
- Agricultural Meteorology
- Agricultural Statistics
- Animal Husbandry & Dairying
- Biochemistry & Agricultural Chemistry
- Crop Physiology
- Entomology
- Extension Education
- Farm Power, Machinery & Structure
- Horticulture
- Irrigation & Water Management
- Nematology
- Plant Breeding & Genetics
- Plant Pathology
- Soil Science
- Tea Husbandry & Technology

=== Faculty of Veterinary Science ===
- Animal Biotechnology
- Animal Genetics & Breeding
- Animal Nutrition
- Animal Production & Management
- Extension Education (Veterinary)
- Veterinary Anatomy & Histology
- Veterinary Gynaecology
- Veterinary Medicine, Public Health & Hygiene
- Veterinary Microbiology
- Veterinary Parasitology
- Veterinary Pathology
- Veterinary Pharmacology & Toxicology
- Veterinary Physiology
- Veterinary Surgery & Radiology
- Poultry Science & Dairy Science

=== Faculty of Community Science ===
- Human development and Family Studies
- Textile Science and Apparel Designing
- Extension Education and Communication Mgt.
- Food Science & Nutrition
- Family resource management

=== Faculty of Fisheries Science ===
- Aquaculture
- Fish Biology
- Hydrography
- Fish Technology & Engineering
- Fish Extension Education
- Fish Economics & Management

The university is the only educational centre in the world to offer a comprehensive four-year degree program in Agriculture with a specialisation in Tea Husbandry and Technology, which covers the entire gamut of tea cultivation, production and marketing. The Faculty of Agriculture offers B.Sc., M.Sc. and PhD degree programmes. The Faculty of Home Science offers B.Sc. and M.Sc. degree programmes in all departments and a PhD. degree programme in Food and Nutrition only. Presently, the number of students enrolled in the first year B.V.Sc. & A.H. degree each year is 100 and the enrolment capacity of each department in the M.V.Sc. and PhD. degree programmes is 10 and 4, respectively, in the Faculty of Veterinary Science.

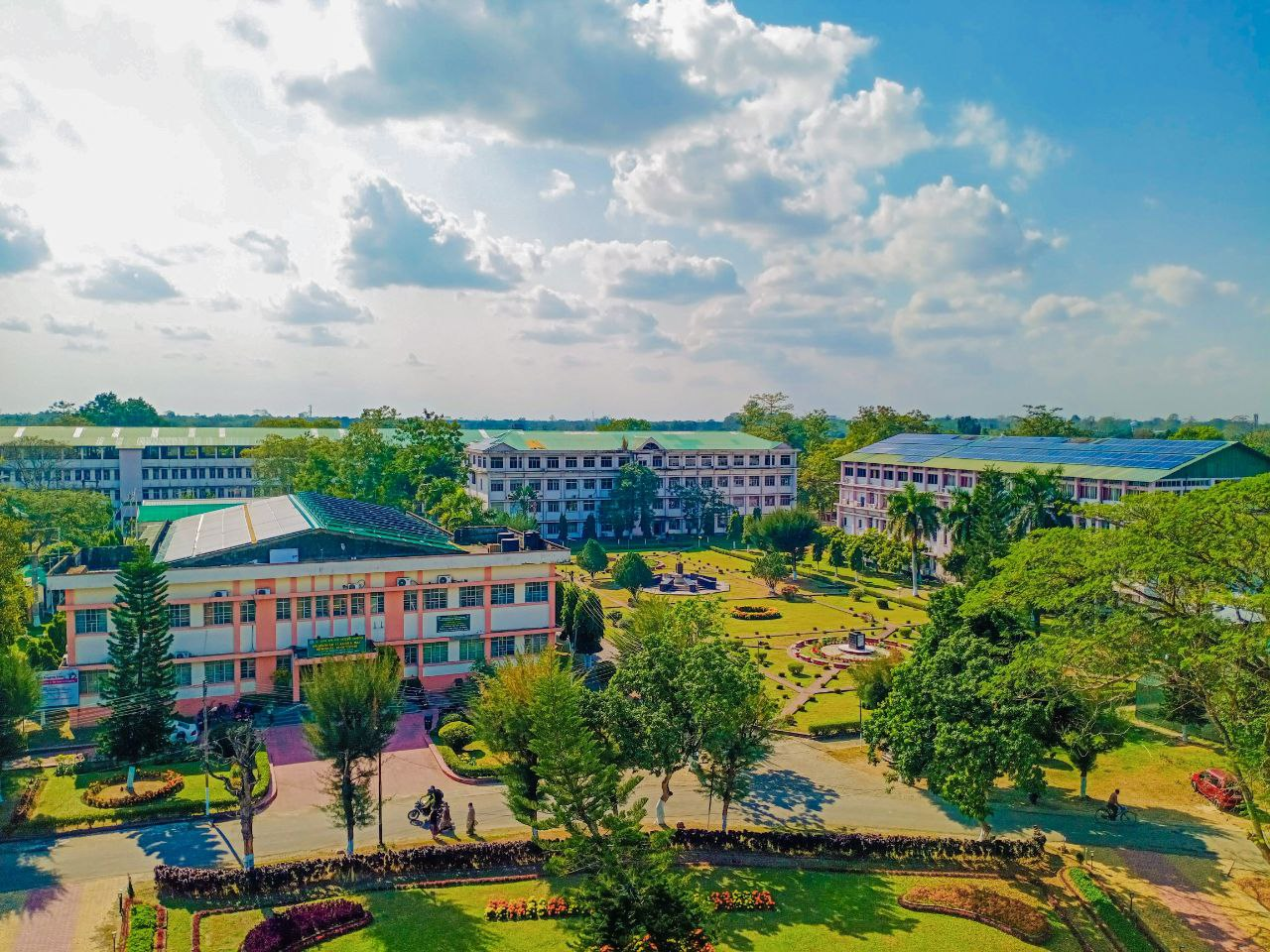
Aerial view of Dr. Madhab Chandra Das Memorial Auditorium and AAU Plaza

== Rankings ==
The university was ranked 18th in India by the NIRF (National Institutional Ranking Framework) in the Agriculture ranking in 2025.
