= Birangana Sati Sadhani Rajyik Vishwavidyalaya =

- Type: Public
- Established: 2021 (5 years ago)
- Affiliations: UGC
- Chancellor: Governor of Assam
- Vice-Chancellor: G. Singaiah
- Location: Golaghat district, Assam
- Website: www.bssrv.ac.in

Birangana Sati Sadhani Rajyik Vishwavidyalaya is a public state university located in Golaghat district, Assam. The university is established by The Birangana Sati Sadhani Rajyik Vishwavidyalaya Act, 2020 which was passed by the Government of Assam on 2 September 2020. On 21 February 2021 Government of Assam appointed Prof. Dr. Jyoti Prasad Saikia as the first Vice-Chancellor of Birangana Sati Sadhani Rajyik Vishwavidyalaya for a term of two years. The university established to commemorate the last queen of the Chutia dynasty, Sati Sadhani.
