= Sati Sadhani =

Legendary queen of the Chutia dynasty

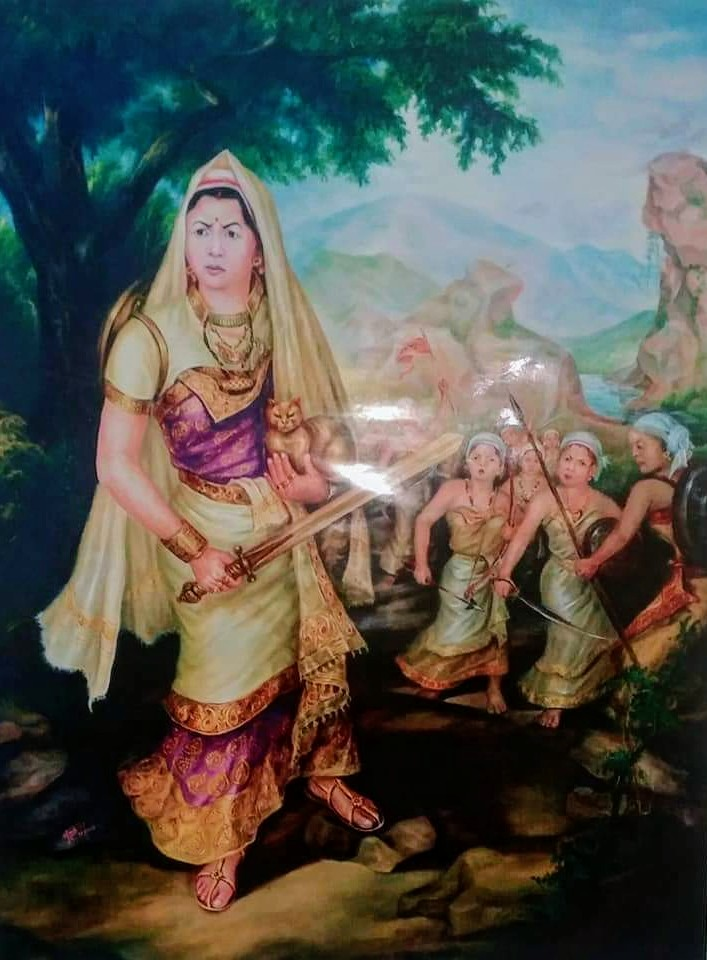
- Modern depiction of Queen Sadhani

Sati Sadhani was a 16th-century queen of the Chutia dynasty. According to the Chutiar Rajar Vamsavali, she was married to Nityapal, the last Chutia king. In the Ahom Buranjis, the chief queen of the Chutias during the Ahom conquest of Sadiya in 1524 is referred to as Nang Lung or Bor Konwari, who is generally identified with Sadhani.

== Divas ==
Every year in Assam, 21 April is celebrated as Sati Sadhani Divas to honour the sacrifices made by the Sutiya Queen. The Government of Assam marked this day as a state holiday.

== Award ==
The Sati Sadhani award was established by the Sutiya Jati Unnayan Parishad. The award is given to someone with outstanding contributions to the field of art, culture and literature. The honoree is selected by a committee formed by the Parishad.

== Film and theatre ==
Her life is depicted by the 20th-century Assamese writer Padmanath Gohain Baruah in the drama Sadhani.

== See also ==
- Birangana Sati Sadhani Rajyik Vishwavidyalaya
- Chutia kingdom
- Chutia people
