= Sri Karan Narendra Agriculture University =

- Type: Public
- Established: 2013; 13 years ago
- Affiliations: ICAR
- Chancellor: Governor of Rajasthan
- Vice-Chancellor: Dr. Pushpendra Singh Chauhan
- Location: Jobner, Rajasthan, India
- Website: www.sknau.ac.in

Sri Karan Narendra Agriculture University (SKNAU) is an agricultural university situated in Jobner, Rajasthan, India. It was established in 2013 by the Government of Rajasthan under Agriculture University, Jobner Act, 2013. Its jurisdiction covers eight districts, namely Ajmer, Alwar, Bharatpur, Dausa, Dholpur, Jaipur, Sikar and Tonk. Dr. Pushpendra Singh Chauhan currently serves as the vice chancellor of the university.

== Constituent colleges ==
The university has the following Constituent colleges:

- SKN College of Agriculture, Jobner
- SKN College of Agri-Business Management, Jobner
- College of Agriculture, Lalsot
- College of Agriculture, Bharatpur
- College of Agriculture, Fatehpur
- College of Agriculture, Navgaon, Alwar
- College of Agriculture, Basedi, Dholpur
- College of Agriculture, Kotputli
- College of Horticulture, Durgapura
