= Karnataka State Rural Development and Panchayat Raj University =

State university in Karnataka

- Motto: Rural Roots Global Heights
- Type: Public
- Established: 2016
- Affiliations: UGC
- Chancellor: Governor of Karnataka
- Vice-Chancellor: Suresh Nadagoudar
- Location: Gadag district, Karnataka, India
- Website: ksrdpru.ac.in

Karnataka State Rural Development and Panchayat Raj University (KSRDPRU) is a state university located at Gadag district, Karnataka, India. It was established in 2016 by the Government of Karnataka under the Karnataka State Rural Development and Panchayat Raj University Act, 2016 to focus on education towards rural development.

The first vice-chancellor (VC) of the university was B. Thimme Gowda, formerly VC of Bangalore University, who remained in office until he retired in March 2018. In May 2020, Vishnukant S. Chatpalli was appointed VC. In July 2026, Suresh V. Nadagoudar was appointed vice-chancellor of the university by the Governor of Karnataka.
