= Arunachal Pradesh University =

University in Arunachal Pradesh

- Motto: ज्ञानम परमं बलम
- Type: Public
- Established: July 1, 2022; 4 years ago
- Affiliations: UGC
- Chancellor: Governor of Arunachal Pradesh
- Vice-Chancellor: Ashan Riddi
- Location: Pasighat, Arunachal Pradesh, India
- Website: apupsg.ac.in

Arunachal Pradesh University (APU), is a State university located at Pasighat, Arunachal Pradesh. It is the sole State University of Arunachal Pradesh, which was established on 1 July 2022 (Notification No. HTE-17/16/2022-HTE-BR-HTE dated 27 May 2022) under the Arunachal Pradesh University Act, 2012 (Act-5 of 2012) of the State Legislature of Arunachal Pradesh (Notification No. LAW/LEGN-13/2012, dated 16 April 2012) as a State University and is empowered to award degrees as specified by the UGC under Section 22 of the UGC Act 1956, by conducting courses through its own departments, its constituent colleges and/or through its affiliated colleges in regular mode with the approval of concerned statutory bodies and Statutory councils, wherever it is required. The name of the University has been included in the list of Universities established as per Section 2(f) of UGC Act, 1956 maintained by the UGC on its website www.ugc.ac.in (UGC F.No.9-11/2022(CPP-I/PU 21 July 2022). The then Chief Minister of Arunachal Pradesh Nabam Tuki laid the foundation stone on January 11, 2013.

== Departments ==
The university currently offers postgraduate and doctoral programmes in 11 departments namely, Commerce, Computer Science, Economics, Education, English, Hindi, Mass Communication, Mathematics, Social Work, Sociology, and Tribal Studies (https://apupsg.ac.in/department-of-tribal-studies/), aimed at fostering socio-economic development and promoting the cultural heritage of Arunachal Pradesh. The university plans to introduce more postgraduate courses to nurture intellectuals who can empower society through their knowledge.
