= Department of Higher Education (Karnataka) =

Government Department of Karnataka

Department overview
- Formed: 2006; 20 years ago
- Jurisdiction: Government of Karnataka
- Headquarters: Bangalore
- Minister responsible: Basavaraj Rayareddy, Minister of Higher Education
- Website: hed.karnataka.gov.in

The Department of Higher Education is a government department of the Government of Karnataka tasked with the governance of higher education in the state of Karnataka, India. Its purview includes policy development, oversight of government-funded and government-aided institutions, and liaison with universities in the state.

== Overview ==
The Department of Higher Education in Karnataka was established in 2006 to oversee and regulate higher education institutions in the state. It has evolved significantly over the ensuing years and its sub-departments include:

Name	Website	Note
Department of Collegiate Education	dce.karnataka.gov.in	
Department of Technical Education	dtek.karnataka.gov.in	
Karnataka State Higher Education Council	kshec.karnataka.gov.in	
Karnataka Examination Authority	cetonline.karnataka.gov.in/kea	

== Ministers of Higher Education ==
The elected official who has oversight of the department is responsible to the Karnataka Legislature, and is called the Minister of Higher Education. The following individuals have served in this role:

Name	Portrait	Term of office	Notes
D. H. Shankaramurthy		2006–2007	
Aravind Limbavali	size	2008–2010	
V. S. Acharya	size	2010–2012	
C. T. Ravi	size	2012–2013	
Basavaraj Rayareddy		2013–2015	
R. V. Deshpande		2015–2016	
Basavaraj Rayareddy		2016–2018	
G. T. Devegowda		2018–2019	
C. N. Ashwath Narayan	size	2019–2023	
M. C. Sudhakar	size	2023–2026	
Basavaraj Rayareddy		2026-present	

== See also ==
- Government of Karnataka
- Education in Karnataka
- UUCMS
