= Jharkhand State Open University =

University in Jharkhand

- University Logo
- Other name: JSOU
- Motto: तमसो मा ज्योतिर्गमय
- Motto in English: Lead me from darkness to light
- Type: Public
- Established: 2021; 5 years ago
- Affiliations: UGC
- Chancellor: Governor of Jharkhand
- Vice-Chancellor: Prof. (Dr.) Abhay Kumar Singh
- Location: Ranchi, Jharkhand, India; 23.4486°N 85.3147°E
- Campus: Urban
- Website: jsou.ac.in

Jharkhand State Open University is a State university Headquarter located at Ranchi, Jharkhand, established by the State Government of Jharkhand under the Jharkhand State Open University Act, 2021 (Jharkhand Act, 12, 2021). It was established to promote the Open University and distance education system in the educational pattern of the Jharkhand State and to provide educational opportunities to those who are unable to go in formal education and wish to upgrade their education or acquire knowledge and studies in various fields through the distance mode of education, such as the Print-medium (correspondence courses), contact programs, study centres, and mass media, and to provide access to Degree, Diploma, and Certificate program.

== Department ==
Jharkhand State Open University has been offering numerous courses through the (Open and Distance Learning) form of education. All of these courses have significant in-house capabilities that students may take use of at any time.

- School of Vocational Education and Training
- School of Business and Management Studies
- School of Journalism & Mass Communication Studies
- School of Computer and Information Sciences
- School of Social Work
- School of Humanities & Social Sciences
- School of Sciences and Technology
- School of Tribal Studies
