= Tamil Nadu Open University =

Open university based in Chennai, India

Coordinates: 13.009879°N 80.231711°E

- Motto: Education for all and ever
- Type: State university
- Established: 2002; 24 years ago
- Affiliations: UGC
- Chancellor: Governor of Tamil Nadu
- Vice-Chancellor: S. Aurumugam
- Location: Chennai, Tamil Nadu, India
- Campus: Urban
- Website: www.tnou.ac.in

Tamil Nadu Open University (TNOU) is an Indian institution for open and distance learning established by the government of Tamil Nadu, India. It was founded in 2002 and is based in Chennai.

== History ==
The university was established by the Government of Tamil Nadu by enacting the Tamil Nadu Open University Act, 2002 (Act 27 of 2002) to provide access to higher education for those who had been previously unable to pursue it. It opened in 2003, was recognized by the University Grants Commission in September 2015, and is one of five universities approved to offer distance learning outside its state of establishment.

As of January 2016 it was one of 14 state open universities in India, which also has one national open university, Indira Gandhi National Open University; as of April 2017 it was one of 111 distance learning institutions in the country. As of December 2017 it offers 113 programmes of study at levels from certificate to post graduate and has 13 academic schools, five support divisions, a media centre and more than 600 learner support centres across Tamil Nadu.

== Admittance ==
Students are admitted under two admission cycles, calendar year (January to December) and academic year (July to June). They include those living in remote and rural areas, working people, handicapped students, housewives and retirees such as a 67-year-old woman who later completed an MA in history with Madras University, and prisoners.
