= Institute of Management and Development, New Delhi =

Business university in India

Institute of Management and Development
- Type: Management Institution; vice chairman: Mr Abhishek Chaudhary
- Established: 2004
- Location: New Delhi, Delhi, India
- Campus: Urban
- Website: IMD, New delhi

Institute of Management and Development (IMD) is a business school in New Delhi, India. It is established under the aegis of Ch.Ram Richpal Education and Research Foundation (India). The college has an A+ ranking according to the Business India, BSchool Survey, 2010.

== History ==
The institute commenced with its first batch of students in August 2005.

In 2009, IMD was one of the establishments which faced technical problems with the Common Admission Test (CAT), with 13 students affected.

In 2011, IMD boycotted the CAT.
