= Sabarmati University =

University in Ahmedabad, Gujarat, India

- Type: Private
- Established: 2009
- Chancellor: Sunny Patel
- Vice-Chancellor: Dr. B. S. Patel
- Dean: Dr. Parshuram Dhaked
- Location: Ahmedabad, Gujarat, India; 23.134958°N 72.509225°E
- Website: www.sabarmatiuniversity.edu.in

Sabarmati University, formerly Calorx Teachers' University (CTU), located in Green Woods Campus near Vaishno Devi Circle in Ahmedabad, Gujarat, India. It was founded in 2009 and is recognized by the University Grants Commission.

== Constituent institutes ==
- School of Research & Development
- School of Law
- School of Education
- School of Pure & Applied Sciences
- School of Humanities & Social Sciences
- School of Commerce & Management
- School of Pharmacy
- Department of Distance Education(DDE)
