= Davangere University =

State University in Karnataka

Davanagere University
- Motto in English: Knowledge is Light
- Type: Public
- Established: 18 August 2009; 16 years ago
- Affiliations: UGC, AICTE
- Chancellor: Governor of Karnataka
- Vice-Chancellor: B. E. Rangaswamy
- Location: Davangere, Karnataka, India; 14°23′34″N 75°57′47″E
- Campus: Shivagangotri, 73 acres
- Website: Official Site

Davangere University is a public state university located in Davangere, Karnataka, India. The university was established in the year 2008 by the Government of Karnataka. Dr. Supriya R is the Chairman and Professor of the Department of studies in commerce of the Davangere University.

== History ==
Davangere University was a post-graduate centre of the University of Mysore from 1979 to 1987 and functioned as a post-graduate centre of Kuvempu University from 1987 to 2009. Davangere University was established on 18 August 2009 out of Kuvempu University.

== Campus ==
The university is located at Shivagangothri Campus Tolahunase, 9 km from Davangere city. It houses the post-graduate departments of Commerce, Biochemistry, Microbiology, Economics, Food Technology, Accounting & Finance, M.Ed., and MSW. The Institute of Management studies is also housed at the P.G. Centre. The campus of 73 acres has attractive buildings as well as hostel and boarding facilities. Davangere University is one of the youngest affiliating type of universities in Karnataka. It has Davangere and Chitradurga districts under its jurisdiction and is headquartered at Davangere. The city is located on National Highway-4 about 265 km from Bangalore, the state capital of Karnataka. Davangere became a separate district from 15 August 1997; before then, it was part of Chitradurga District.

== Organisation and administration ==
=== Colleges ===
It has two constituent colleges, one autonomous college and 110 affiliated colleges offering graduate and post-graduate course in disciplines catering to the education needs of nearly 400,000 students.

=== Faculties ===
The university has five faculties: Arts, Science and Technology, Commerce and Management, Engineering and Education. It has seven post-graduate departments of studies and research on the main campus offering eight post-graduate and one P.G. diploma courses. The constituent university college of (Fine) Visual Arts (established in the year 1964) has two departments and offers Bachelor of Visual Arts & Master of Visual Arts courses.
