= College of Technology & Engineering, Udaipur =

Public college in Udaipur, Rajasthan, India

Coordinates: 24.5982752°N 73.7337863°E

College of Technology and Engineering, Udaipur
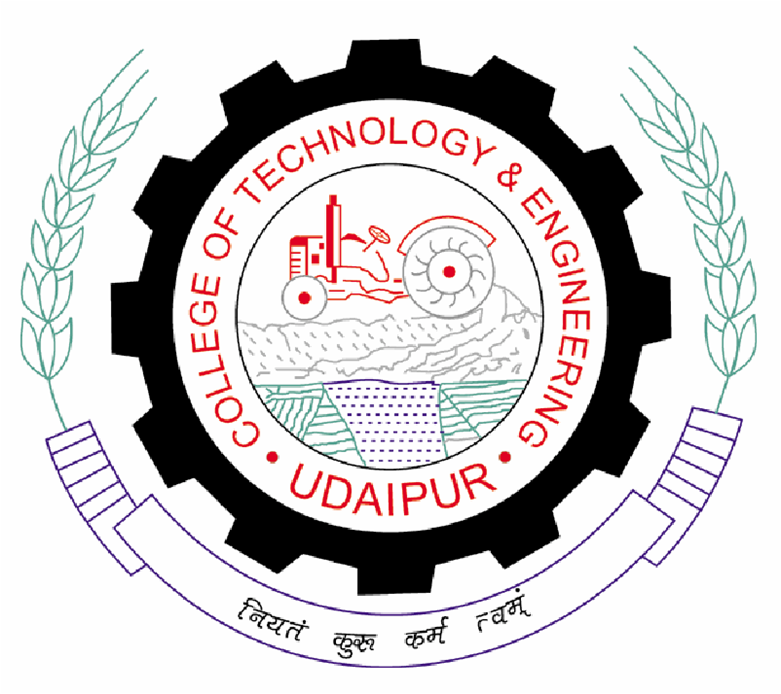
- College of Technology & Engineering, Udaipur
- Motto: Niyatam Kuru Karma Twamam
- Type: Government
- Established: 1964
- Dean: Dr. Sunil Joshi
- Location: Udaipur, Rajasthan, India
- Campus: Urban
- Website: www.ctae.ac.in

The College of Technology and Engineering (CTAE), is a public engineering college located in Udaipur, Rajasthan, India. It is one of the top ranking engineering institute of the state offering varied courses in engineering.

== History ==
The College of Technology and Engineering (CTAE) was established by the government of Rajasthan in 1964 by offering undergraduate course in Agricultural Engineering. It had its beginning in the Rajasthan College of Agriculture and shifted to its present premises on new campus of the University in 1968. Academic and physical facilitates of Udaipur Polytechnic was also transferred by state government to the College in 1975-76. However, considering industrial growth and human resource development in the state, additional degree programmes in Electrical, Mechanical and Mining Engineering in 1996, Computer Science and Engineering in 2000, Electronics and Communication Engineering in 2006, Information Technology and Civil Engineering in 2007 were added. All degree programmes have approval from AICTE. The admissions to the degree programmes are made through State level Pre Engineering Test(RPET, now RPET has been replaced by REAP (Rajasthan Engineering Admission Process)) and JEE Main. Fifteen per cent seats in Agricultural Engineering are also filled up through ICAR.

The college also offers post graduate programme leading to M.E. (Ag) & Ph.D. in Soil & Water Conservation Engineering, Irrigation Water Management Engineering, Farm Machinery & Power Engineering, Processing & Food Engineering and Renewable Energy Sources Engineering. The post graduate programme in Agricultural Engineering was started in 1978-79. The Ph.D. programmes in all specialization areas of Agricultural Engineering were started in 1996-97. The college also offers job oriented post graduate diploma programme in Organic Agriculture Management. Post graduate programmes leading to M. E. (Mechanical) in CAD/CAM and M. E. (Electrical) in Power Systems and Control Engineering and power electronics, M. E. (Mining) in Mine Planning, M. E. (Computer) in Computer Engineering, have also been added from this session.

== Overview: Maharana Pratap University of Agriculture and Technology, Udaipur ==
The College of Technology and Engineering (CTAE) of Udaipur, Rajasthan, India, is a constituent college of the Maharana Pratap University of Agriculture and Technology. The Government of Rajasthan founded the Agriculture University, Maharana Pratap University of Agriculture and Technology, Udaipur by the splitting of Rajasthan Agriculture University, Bikaner on 1 November 1999. Since then it has been the principal academic institution supporting mainly south and south-eastern parts of Rajasthan, shouldering the national responsibility of identifying, designing, preparing and adapting new techniques in the field of production technology for agricultural development.

== Departments ==
=== Department of Computer Science and Engineering ===
The department holds seminars and discussions, organizes industrial visits to specialized sectors like networking and communication, marks assignments, runs projects and laboratory exercises. The college has recently registered under the Coursera campus program and is helping students to improve their grades.

==== Computing facilities ====
Servers

- Sun Netra T100 running Solaris 8, Oracle 8i database server
- Proliant ML350 running Windows 2000, Exchange Server, SQL Server
- Proliant ML310 running Redhat Linux 9 ES, MySQL Database Server
- Sun Spark 20 running Solaris 2.5.1

Clients

- 10 SunRay-100, 17" graphics terminals
- 22 VXL Citrix thin clients
- 75 Pentium based clients running Windows/Linux

Development tools

- Sun Forte Studio
- Microsoft Studio 6.0
- Ms Studio .Net

LAN and Internet access

- All servers are connected by UTP cable and layer 2 switches. Internet accessibility is through ISDN BRI from BSNL and distributed through a Cisco 830 router.
- A 4 Mbit/s leased line from department provides 24 hours internet for the students and the staff of the whole university.

=== Department of Electrical Engineering ===
The department was established in 1996 offering Diploma in electrical stream. The undergraduate program was started in 1996 with the discontinuation of the diploma program.

The faculty hold M.E/M.Tech./M.B.A. degrees from institutes in India.

The Department offers teaching at undergraduate and postgraduate levels.

==== Facilities ====
The department laboratories include Electrical Machine lab, Electrical Measurement lab, Electrical Workshop, Computer lab, Microprocessor lab, Control System lab, Power System lab, Power Electronics lab and Basic Electrical lab.

Labs are equipped with:

- Robotic system for industrial process simulation.
- PLC system
- Digital power line supervisor
- Data logger
- Industrial process fault finding trainer
- MATLAB, visual simulation
- Energy auditor.

The department has its own library.

=== Department of Electronics and Communication Engineering ===
The department teaches Electronics, Telecommunication, IT, VLSI, Telecommunication, Microprocessor, and Microwave Engineering.

The curriculum of the four-year B.E degree course in Electronics and Communication Engineering is a theoretical and practical course, with industrial exposure. It has Club of Robotics and Electronics(CORE) which is student driven club.

==== Facilities ====
Support to meet the objectives of the department is provided by the following laboratories:

- Digital Hardware and Microprocessor Laboratory
- Communication Engineering Laboratory
- Microwave and Antenna Laboratory
- Artificial Intelligence Lab
- System Design Laboratory
- Optical Fiber Lab
- System Design & VLSI Laboratory

=== Department of Farm Machinery and Power Engineering ===
The department is engaged in teaching, research and extension activities. It offers undergraduate, postgraduate and doctoral programs. The department has sponsored research projects, and liaison with industries like ASPEE, Mumbai, and tractor industries, for M.Tech. and doctoral students in project work.

The department has a mechanized farm where students are trained to operate agricultural machinery. The department is conducting research on bio-diesel, utilization of animal energy, farm implements, and machinery, ergonomics, and safety in agriculture. Under the extension activities of the department, field days are organized and demonstrations are conducted on the farmers’ field. The department organizes training programs sponsored by DST on EDP

==== Facilities ====
- Computer Lab
- Farm Machinery Lab
- Farm Power Lab
- Workshops
- Fully Computerized Bio-Diesel Lab
- Traction Lab
- Farms for Testing on Mechanization
- Advanced Audio-Visual Teaching aids

=== Department of Mechanical Engineering ===
The department was established in 1957 offering a Diploma in Mechanical Engineering. An undergraduate program in mechanical engineering was started in 1996, discontinuing the diploma program. The department has an annual intake of 40 students through the state level admission test. The undergraduate program of the department is approved by the AICTE.

==== Facilities ====
- Refrigeration and Air-conditioning lab
- Heat transfer lab
- Instrumentation and Control lab
- Metrology lab
- CAD lab
- Dynamics lab
- Fluid Mechanics and Machines lab
- Industrial Engineering lab

The labs are equipped with Dual channel FFT analyzer, tool room microscope, air-conditioning tutor, refrigeration tutor, IC engine test rigs, heat transfer rigs, and hydraulics turbines. The CAD lab has software like AutoCAD, ANSYS, etc. with free access to all the students and faculty for their teaching and research needs.

The machine shop has turret lathes, capstan lathes, CNC lathes, and other machine tools.

=== Department of Mining Engineering ===
The department was established in 1957 for imparting the diploma in Mining and Mine Surveying Engineering (a sandwich course). It was converted to a degree program in 1996 with an annual intake capacity of 20 students. The students with 10+2 as minimum qualification are admitted through RPET (State level admission test, now RPET has been replaced by REAP (Rajasthan Engineering Admission Process)) and AIEEE (National level admission test).

The department has its own building, with Computing laboratory, Rock Mechanics and Dimensional Stone Laboratory, Environmental Laboratory, and Geology Laboratory. Classrooms have OHP, LCD and computers. There are 3000 books related to Mining Engineering in the college library and 225 books in the departmental library. Thirteen national and international journal related to Mining Engineering is subscribed.

The department has postgraduate courses in two disciplines, Mine planning and Mine Environment, and a doctoral program. The department solves industry problems through research and consultancy. The department is situated in the heart of a mining area so that students get practical exposure. Guest faculties from companies like DGMS, DMG, IBM, HZL, RSMML are invited.

==== Facilities ====
The department has its own building with laboratories, classrooms and seminar rooms. Classrooms have OHP, LCD, and computers. Department has internet access through the institute's local area network and the WiFi facility is also available.

Laboratories are given as below:

- Environment Laboratory
- Mine Planning and Computing Laboratory
- Rock Mechanics and Dimensional Stone Laboratory
- Mining and Mineral Dressing Laboratory
- Mining Geology Laboratory
- Survey Laboratory

The department library has text and reference books relevant to the subject taught at the undergraduate level for teachers and students.

=== Department of Processing and Food Engineering ===
The department teaches undergraduate, postgraduate and Ph.D. students. The department was started in 1972. It offers an undergraduate programme of BE (Agri.), postgraduate degree program for Agricultural Engineering, Chemical Engineering and Dairy Technology graduates and a Ph.D. programme in Processing and Food Engineering.

==== Facilities ====
The department labs include Food Engineering, Food Analysis, Dairy Engineering, Unit Operation laboratories and one Agro-processing Centre. Courses teach food engineering, post harvest engineering, dairy engineering and instrumentation.

The laboratories are:

- Unit Operations
- Dairy Engineering
- Food Engineering
- Agro Processing Centre/NATP lab
- Milling Lab
- Food Quality Analysis

=== Department of Renewable Energy Sources Engineering ===
The department is involved in teaching undergraduate and postgraduate students, and conducting research in the field of solar, biogas, slurry management, biomass gasification and biomass production. Its extension activities relate to new and renewable energy sources at the village level.

==== Facilities ====
The laboratories include:

- Biogas Appliances Testing Lab
- Biomass Power Lab
- Solar Energy Lab
- Demonstration and Testing of improved cookstove lab
- Biogas Technology Lab
- PG Computer Lab
- Solar/Biogas/IC yard)
- Greenhouses
- Workshops

=== Department of Soil and Water Engineering ===
The department was started in 1964. The department teaches at undergraduate level leading to degree of BE(Ag.). The department started a Master program in Soil and Water Conservation Engineering in 1978 and in Irrigation Water Management Engineering in 1986. Leading to the degree of ME(Ag.), the Ph.D. program in Soil and Water Conservation Engineering and Irrigation Water Management Engineering was started in 1996. The department has produced 78 ME/Ph.

==== Facilities ====
The laboratories are-

- Soil and Water Conservation Engineering Laboratory
- Agro Meteorological Observatory
- Irrigation and Water Management Demonstration Laboratory
- Drainage Laboratory
- Ground Water Pumping Laboratory
- Soil Conservation Demonstration Farm

=== Department of Civil Engineering ===
The department was established in 1965 offering the Diploma in Civil Engineering. An undergraduate program in Civil Engineering was started in 2007. The department has an annual intake of 40 students through the state level admission test. The undergraduate programme of the department is approved by the AICTE.

The students are taught design of buildings and structures, learn survey methods, and are taught computing techniques and drafting tools such as AutoCAD, STAAD, and SAP. Electives in the final year allow the students to acquire knowledge of areas like Finite Element Method, Advanced Foundation Engineering, Repair and rehabilitation of structures, and Neural Networks.

==== Facilities ====
The following laboratories are in the department:

- Concrete Technology
- Material Testing
- Geo-technical Lab
- Transportation Engineering Lab
- Surveying Lab
- Public Health Engineering Lab
- Engineering Mechanics lab
- Computational Lab
- Models Lab

=== Department of Information Technology ===
This is a new department started in 2007; the department gives seminars and discussions, industrial visits to sectors like networking and communication, assignments, projects, and laboratory exercises. The dept has closed since 2019

=== Department of Artificial Intelligence and Data Science ===
This is new Department started in 2021, This department is part of the Computer Science Department.

=== Department of Basic Sciences ===
The department was reshaped in 1996 by merging three departments, Physics, Chemistry and Mathematics. Before this, these departments were running from 1964. The department offers courses in areas of Physics, Chemistry and Mathematics at undergraduate level to the Engineering, B.Sc (Agri.) and Dairy and Food Technology students of the university.

==== Facilities ====
The labs are:

- Engineering Physics Lab
- Engineering Chemistry Lab

== Campus ==
The institute has following major facilities:

Laboratories

Library

Cafeteria

Medical facility

Academic/Administrative block

Indoor & Outdoor sports facility

Workshops

Hostel facility

== Hostel ==
The college has 5 boys hostels and 2 girls hostel named below. A.N Khosla hostel, M.V.Hostel, P.G Hostel, GSM hostel, Subhash chandra bose hostel, Ganga girls hostel, Ctae Girls hostel, Apart from these, college have 1 scientist hostel.

== Ranking ==
- The CTAE has been awarded best engineering college award in northern region by the National Institute of Technical Teachers Training Institute Chandigarh for the year 2012-13.
- CTAE has been ranked 82nd in All India Ranking by the National Institutional Ranking Framework (NIRF) of MHRD.
- The CTAE ranks 3rd in Rajasthan after IIT Jodhpur and MNIT Jaipur.

== Administrative structure ==
- Vice-Chancellor, MPUAT
- Dean and Chairman, Faculty of Technology and Engineering
- Heads of Departments
