= Yergera =

Village in Karnataka, India

- village
- Country: India
- State: Karnataka
- District: Raichur
- Talukas: Raichur

Government
  - Body: Gram panchayat

Population (2001)
  - Total: 5,054

Languages
  - Official: Kannada
- Time zone: UTC+5:30 (IST)
- ISO 3166 code: IN-KA
- Vehicle registration: KA
- Website: karnataka.gov.in

Yergera is a village in the southern state of Karnataka, India. It is located in the Raichur taluk of Raichur district in Karnataka.

== Demographics ==
As of 2001 India census, Yergera had a population of 5054 with 2584 males and 2470 females.

== See also ==
- Raichur
- Districts of Karnataka
