= Raja Mansingh Tomar Music & Arts University =

State University in Madhya Pradesh

- Type: Public
- Established: 2008
- Academic affiliations: UGC
- Vice-Chancellor: Prof. Smita Sahasrabudhe
- Location: Gwalior, Madhya Pradesh, India; 26.191°N 78.179°E
- Website: rmtmusicandartsuniversity.com

Raja Mansingh Tomar Music & Arts University is a state university located at Gwalior, Madhya Pradesh, India. It was established in 2008 by the Government of Madhya Pradesh and is named after Maharaja Mansingh Tomar. The university offers courses in music, dance, fine arts and drama & theater. It has 170 affiliated colleges.
