= Assam Veterinary and Fishery University =

University in Khanapara, Assam, India

- অসম পশুপালন আৰু মৎস্য বিশ্ববিদ্যালয়
- Type: Public
- Established: 2024; 2 years ago
- Chancellor: Governor of Assam
- Vice-Chancellor: Dr. Niranjan Kalita
- Location: Guwahati, Assam, India
- Campus: Urban
- Website: www.avfu.ac.in

Assam Veterinary and Fishery University (AVFU), formerly College of Veterinary Science is a veterinary university situated in Khanapara, Assam, India. The university focuses on veterinary and fishery sciences.

== History ==
The Assam Veterinary and Fishery University Bill, 2024, was passed by the Assam Assembly on the fourth day of its Autumn Session. It was introduced by Animal Husbandry and Veterinary Minister Atul Bora, to establish a new university specializing in veterinary and fishery sciences.

Later, the university was formed in February, 2024 by merging existing veterinary colleges and the College of Fishery Science in Assam that was earlier under the Assam Agriculture University, Jorhat. This initiative was part of the Government of Assam's efforts to create a specialized institution that would cater to the growing demand for skilled professionals in veterinary and fishery sciences.

The College of Veterinary Science was established in 1948 at Nagaon as Assam Veterinary College, with 33 students in its first batch. After independence, the college began its journey toward becoming a premier institute. It became a part of Assam Agricultural University in 1969.

The college initially offered a 3-year G.V.Sc. diploma. Later, it introduced the Trimester System and postgraduate courses in five disciplines. The intake for B.V.Sc. & A.H. increased from 65 to 150 by 1985. By 1995, it adopted Veterinary Council of India regulations. Currently, 100 students enroll in B.V.Sc. & A.H., with 10 and 4 seats available for M.V.Sc. and Ph.D. programs, respectively.

== Colleges and Departments ==
AVFU comprises various colleges and departments that provide specialized education and training:

1. College of Veterinary Science: Located in Khanapara, this college offers undergraduate, postgraduate, and doctoral programs in veterinary science.
2. Lakhimpur College of Veterinary Science, North Lakhimpur, Assam offering B.V.Sc. & A.H.
3. College of Fisheries, Raha: Situated in Raha, this college focuses on fishery science education and research.
4. Research Stations: The university oversees multiple research stations that facilitate practical learning and research activities related to veterinary and fishery sciences.
5. Krishi Vigyan Kendras (KVKs): AVFU also manages 5 KVKs (Note: "Krishi Vigyan Kendra" translates to "Agricultural Science Center" in English. These centers located at Kamrup, Morigaon, North Lakhimpur, Baksa and Barpeta are established by ICAR, aim to train farmers, demonstrate new technologies, and provide solutions to agricultural challenges.) that serve as agricultural extension centers, providing training and resources to local farmers.
