= Raha, Assam =

Raha is a small town in Nagaon district of Assam, India, situated near the National Highway 37. The river Kolong and Kopili flows near Raha. Raha is also situated near to Chaparmukh, a small town popularly known for Chaparmukh junction, one of the prominent railway stations in Nagaon district.

== Education ==
=== School ===
- Raha Higher Secondary School
- Raha Girls High School
- Raha Adarsha Sarkari Nimna Buniyadi Abhyaxon Vidyalaya
- Pranjal Memorial Academy
- Raha Adarsha Shishu Bikash Kendra
- Pandit Gopinath Bordoloi High School
- Sankardev Sishu Vidya Niketan Raha.
- St. Basil's Academy, Chaparmukh.

=== Junior College ===
- Raha Resonance Junior College

=== College ===
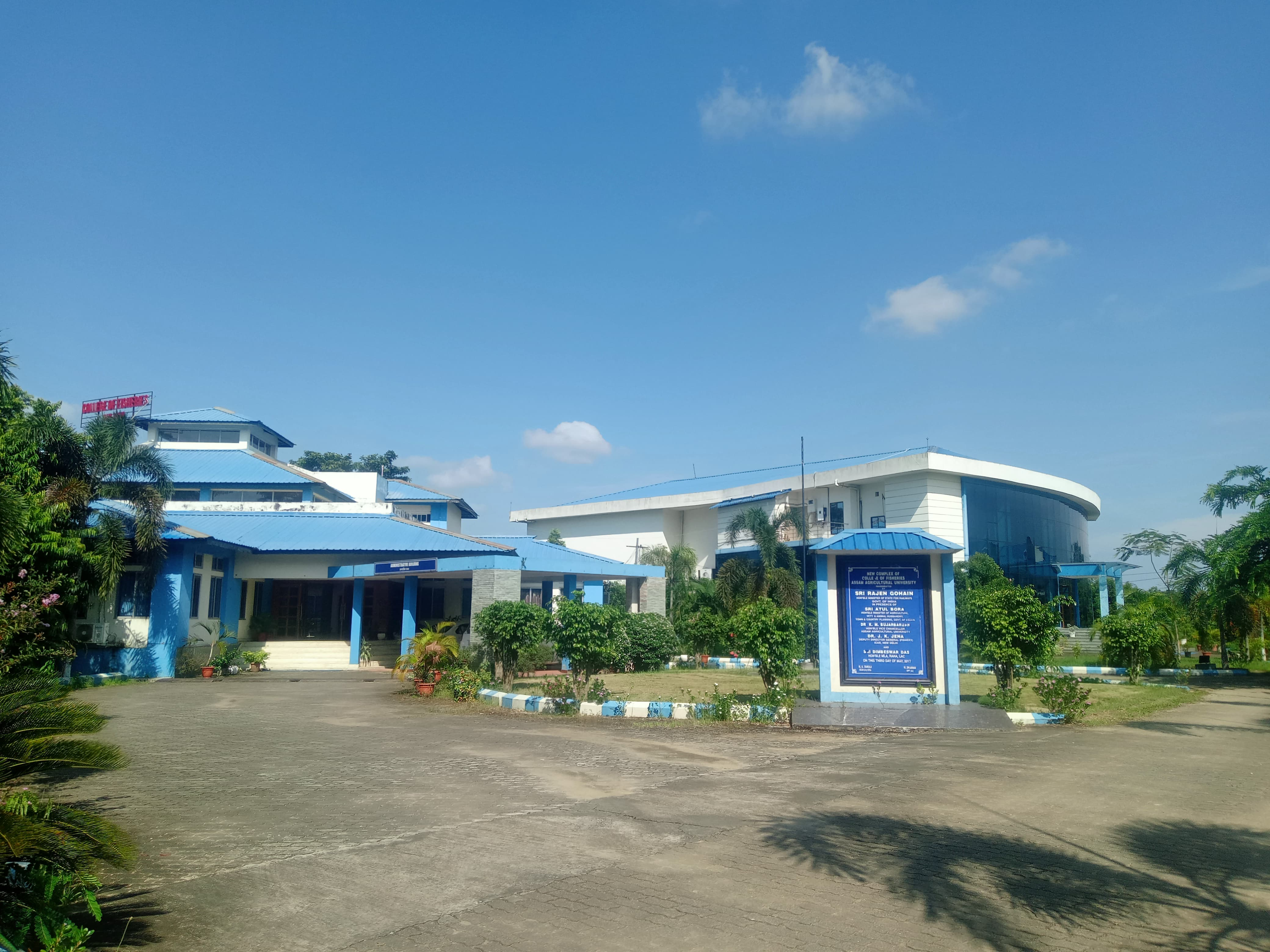
College of Fisheries Science

- Raha College
- College of Fisheries Science, Raha

== Politics ==
Raha is part of Nowgong (Lok Sabha constituency). Present MLA of Raha Vidhan Sabha constituency is Sashi Kanta Das from Congress.

== Notable people ==
- Gopinath Bordoloi, first chief minister of Assam. He was born in Raha. His house has been converted to a museum with his personal items, clothes, letters to and from notable politicians of his age, like M K Gandhi. This museum, maintained by the government of Assam, is open to the visitors every day except holidays.
- Banwari Lal Hansaria, former judge of the Supreme Court of India, hails from Raha.
