= Haveri University =

Public state university in Haveri

- Type: Public research university
- Established: 2022; 4 years ago
- Affiliations: UGC, NAAC
- Vice-Chancellor: Dr. Suresh. H. Jangamashetti
- Location: Haveri, Karnataka, India

The Haveri University is a public state university located in Haveri, Karnataka, India. The university was established in 2022 under The Karnataka State University (Amendment) Act, 2022.

== History ==
Chikkakalya Narayanappa Ashwathnarayan, Minister of Higher Education, announced the establishment of Haveri University in August 2022. The Karnataka State University (Amendment) Bill-2022 was passed in the Karnataka Assembly in September 2022. The Karnataka legislature of the Karnataka state established Haveri University through the Karnataka State University (Amendment) Act, 2022. The first Vice-Chancellor was appointed in 2023.
