= Raichur University =

University in Karnataka, India

Coordinates: 16.0983°N 77.4128°E

Adikavi Sri Maharshi Valmiki University, Raichur
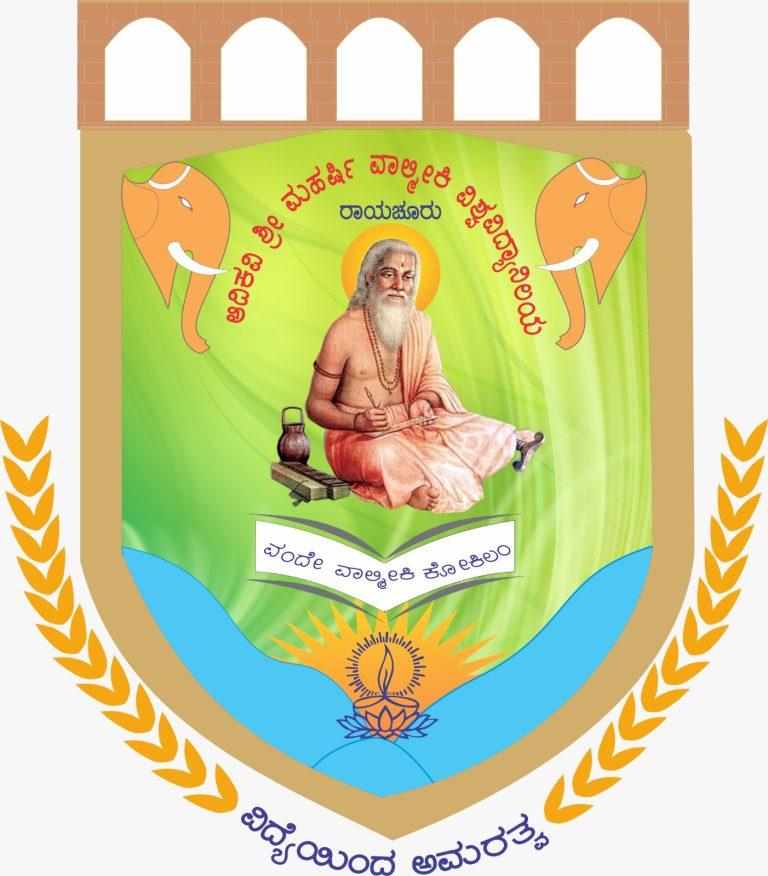
- Adikavi Sri Maharshi Valmiki University Raichur's logo
- Motto: ವಿದ್ಯೆಯಿಂದ ಅಮರತ್ವವು
- Motto in English: Immortality through knowledge
- Type: Public
- Established: 2021 (5 years ago)
- Chancellor: Thawar Chand Gehlot; (Governors of Karnataka)
- Vice-Chancellor: Dr.Shivananda Kelaginamani
- Location: Raichur, Karnataka, India
- Campus: Rural
- Website: raichuruniversity.ac.in

Raichur University, Raichur which officially changed its name Adikavi Sri Maharshi Valmiki University, Raichur, is a public university located in Raichur, Karnataka, India. The university is recognized by University Grants Commission.

== Description ==
Raichur University was established in 2021 by an Act of Karnataka State. Earlier it was a post-graduate centre of Gulbarga University, Kalaburagi. The university has 18 departments with great faculties.

The university's motto is "Vidyeyinda Amarathvavu" (Immortality through knowledge).

== Departments ==
- Kannada
- English
- Urdu and Persian
- History
- Economics
- Political Science
- Sociology
- Social Work
- Library and information science
- Journalism and Mass Communication
- Women's Studies
- Commerce
- Physics
- Chemistry
- Botany
- Zoology
- Microbiology
- Department of Instrumentation

== Location ==
Raichur University is located on the national highway 167 near Yeragera village in Raichur district Karnataka India.it is covered by mountains and forest where we can experience good environment.

== Description ==
The political scientist Prof. Harish Ramaswamy was appointed as the first vice-chancellor of Raichur University in 2020. Raichur University is a new university in Karnataka state of raichur district in India. under its official section has two major districts called Yadgiri and Raichur. Colleges and PG centers of both Yadgiri and Raichur district belongs to Raichur University.
