= Sardarkrushinagar Dantiwada Agricultural University =

Agricultural university in Banaskantha, Gujarat, India

Coordinates: 24.3217°N 72.317722°E

- Type: Public
- Established: 1972; 54 years ago
- Affiliations: ICAR
- Chancellor: Governor of Gujarat
- Vice-Chancellor: Prof. Rajeshwar Singh Chandel
- Location: Palanpur, Gujarat, India, India
- Campus: Rural
- Website: www.sdau.edu.in

Sardarkrushinagar Dantiwada Agricultural University (SDAU) is a State Agricultural University in India. It is approximately 30 km (19 mi) from Palanpur town in Banaskantha District of Gujarat.

== History ==
The Gujarat Agricultural University started functioning in June 1972. It was established with specific mandates of promoting productivity of agriculture by pursuing research in agriculture and allied sciences. The unique feature of the Gujarat Agricultural University was a multi-campus set-up. The other three campuses were at Junagadh, Navsari and Anand.

Since 2004, the GAU was split into four campuses. The Gujarat Agricultural University started functioning with specific mandates for promoting productivity of agriculture through the pursuance of research in agriculture and allied sciences. The Gujarat Agricultural University had 11 constituent colleges faculties which undertook undergraduate and postgraduate teaching under a semester system.

The total number of students who have graduated from the Gujarat Agricultural University (until 1996) were 8532 in Agriculture, Veterinary Science, Renewable Energy & Environmental Engineering, Dairy Science, Basic Science and HumanitiesAgricultural Engineering, Horticulture and Forestry, Home Science and Fisheries. 2159 students have obtained Masters, and 393 have acquired their PhD degrees.

== Campuses ==
Gujarat Agricultural University does not exist any more. The four campuses of Gujarat Agricultural University were converted into four independent universities on May 1, 2004, by Gujarat Government through the Gujarat Agricultural Universities Act 2004.

The Sardarkrushinagar campus in Dantiwada Taluka (earlier the headquarters of GAU) is known as Sardarkrushinagar Dantiwada Agricultural University and has ten colleges:

- Shri G.N. Patel College of Dairy Technology
- College of Food Technology
- C.P. College of Agriculture
- College of Agriculture at Tharad
- College of Veterinary Science and Animal Husbandry
- ASPEE College of Home Science
- College of Agri-Business Management
- College of Basic Science & Humanities
- College of Renewable Energy & Environmental Engineering
- College of Horticulture, Jagudan(Mahesana)

[Note:- In year 2021 all the dairy, veterinary & fisheries colleges are removed from all agricultural university located in Gujarat & Now this colleges operate under Kamdhenu University.] The other agriculture universities which were converted into universities from GAU are Anand Agricultural University, Navsari Agricultural University, Navsari and Junagadh Agricultural University, Junagadh.
