= Jobner =

- Town
- Location in Rajasthan, India Jobner (India)
- Coordinates: 26.97°N 75.38°E
- Country: India
- State: Rajasthan
- District: Jaipur
- Elevation: 400 m (1,300 ft)

Population (2020)
  - Total: 55,496

Languages
  - Official: Hindi English Rajasthani Urdu
- Time zone: UTC+5:30 (IST)
- Postal code: 303329

Jobner is a tehsil headquarter and one of the oldest municipalities (since 1948) in the Jaipur district in the Indian state of Rajasthan.

== Geography ==
Jobner is located at 26.97°N 75.38°E. It has an average elevation of 400 m. At one end of Jobner, a hill is situated which has two forts and various temples.In summers, mercury rises up to 48 °C while in winters, it lowers down to -7 °C. Jobner is one of the coldest cities in Rajasthan. Jobner is about 30 km west of Jaipur. It is well connected to Ajmer, Nagaur, Sikar, and Jaipur as it is situated in mid of all these cities linked by highways. Various national and state highways are linked by this city like the Jaipur-Nagaur-Phalodi highway and NH48 (Delhi-Jaipur-Mumbai) highway. Jobner railway station is just 7 km away from main city named as JOB in railway code. Phulera Junction is also just 16 km away from the Jobner city which have railway code FL. Nearest airports are SMS international airport 45 km and Kishangarh international airport 80 km from the Main Jobner city. The nearest pond Jhapdiya talab is 7km far from Jobner city in Jagmalpura, which was made by Lt. Badri Narayan, son of Lt. Ramdev Jangid in 1940.

== Demographics ==
At the 2020 India census, Jobner had a population of 55,496. Males constituted 52% of the population and females 48%. Literacy rate of Jobner city is 81.07% higher than state average of 66.11%. In Jobner, Male literacy is around 92.21% while female literacy rate is 69.12%.
