= Maharana Pratap University of Agriculture and Technology =

Public university in Udaipur, Rajasthan, India

Coordinates: 24.5915°N 73.7301°E

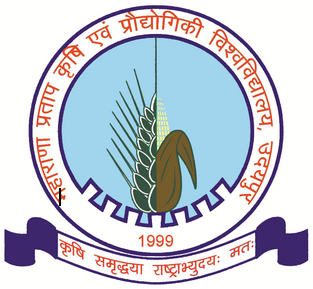
- Type: Government
- Established: 1999; 27 years ago
- Chancellor: Governor of Rajasthan
- Vice-Chancellor: Dr. Pratap Singh
- Location: Udaipur, Rajasthan, India
- Campus: Urban
- Website: www.mpuat.ac.in

Maharana Pratap University of Agriculture and Technology is situated in Udaipur city of Rajasthan state in India. The government of Rajasthan founded this university by the bifurcation of Rajasthan Agriculture University, Bikaner on 1 November 1999. Since then it has been the principal academic institution supporting mainly south and south-eastern parts of Rajasthan, taking the national responsibility of identifying, designing, preparing and adapting new techniques in the field of production technology for agricultural development. Its jurisdiction is spread over 7 districts of Rajasthan: Banswara, Bhilwara, Chittorgarh, Dungarpur, Pratapgarh, Rajsamand, and Udaipur.

Apart from six constituent colleges, the university comprises Agricultural Research Stations, Agricultural Research Sub Stations, Livestock Research Station, Dry Land Farming Research Station and Krishi Vigyan Kendras.

Narendra Singh Rathore was appointed vice chancellor in 2019, and currently Dr. Pratap Singh has been appointed the Vice Chancellor of (MPUAT) in October 2025.

== Constituent colleges ==
The university comprises six constituent colleges:

- Rajasthan College of Agriculture, Udaipur
- College of Dairy & Food Technology, Udaipur
- College of Technology & Engineering, Udaipur
- College of Fisheries, Udaipur
- College of community and applied sciences, Udaipur
- College of Agriculture, Bhilwara
