= Karnataka Folklore University =

State University in Karnataka

Karnataka Jaanapada Vishwavidyalaya
- Other name: Karnataka Folklore University
- Type: Public
- Established: June 16, 2012; 14 years ago
- Affiliations: UGC
- Chancellor: Governor of Karnataka
- Vice-Chancellor: Vacant
- Location: Shiggaon, Karnataka, India
- Website: www.janapadauniversity.ac.in/English/

Karnataka Jaanapada Vishwavidyalaya, also known as Karnataka Folklore University, is a public university exclusively dedicated to the study and research of folklore. It was established in 2012 at Haveri district by the Government of Karnataka. Its first vice chancellor was Ambalike Hiriyanna.

The university is claimed to be world's first university for folklore. It was inaugurated on 16 June 2012 by the then Chief Minister of Karnataka D. V. Sadananda Gowda. The university is in Gotagodi, Shiggaon, Karnataka, India. It offers degrees M.A. in various fields were well MBA, MPhil and PhD.
