= State university (India) =

Category of universities in India

In India, state universities are run and funded by the state government of each of the states of India.

Following the adoption of the Constitution of India in 1950, education became a state responsibility. Following a constitutional change in 1976, it became a joint responsibility of the states and the central government.

As of 23 August 2022, the University Grants Commission lists 456 state universities.

== UGC Act ==
Section 12 (B) of the UGC Act of 1956 also grants the UGC the right to "allocate and disburse, out of the Fund of the Commission, grants to Universities..." As such, the UGC categorizes state universities as either "declared fit to receive Central/UGC assistance under Section 12 (B) of the UGC Act–1956", or not, and notes this status at the lists published. Updates to these declarations are done in meetings of the UGC and published in the minutes. The latest list, published by the UGC on 17 May 2021, lists 252 universities fit to receive Central/UGC assistance.

== See also ==
- List of state universities in India
- List of universities in India
