= List of agricultural universities in India =

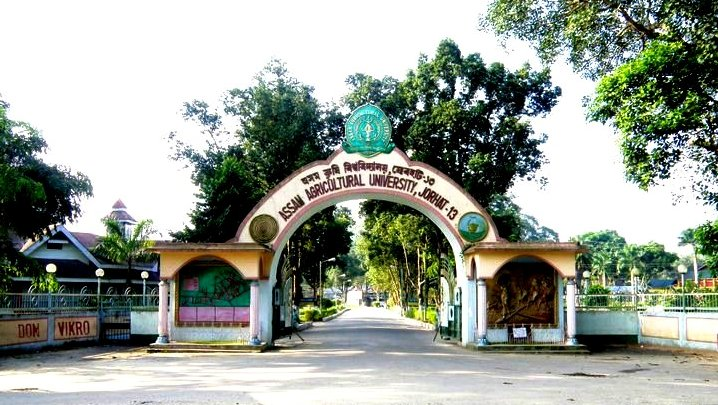
Assam Agricultural University

This article lists agricultural universities (AUs) in India, by state or territory. Although a number of Indian universities offer agricultural education, the Indian Council of Agricultural Research (ICAR), the main regulator of agricultural education, recognizes three "Central Agricultural Universities", four Deemed Universities and 63 "State Agricultural Universities", as of January 2021. (Note: The Indian Agricultural Universities Association (IAUA) also provides a list of member universities. However, this list includes institutes which offer agricultural education which are not agricultural universities per se such as Banaras Hindu University.)

== Universities by state ==
The state with the most agricultural universities in India is Uttar Pradesh with seven universities (one deemed, one central and five state universities). There are no agricultural universities in Arunachal Pradesh, Goa, Meghalaya, Mizoram, Nagaland, Sikkim or Tripura, nor on any of the union territories, except Delhi and Jammu and Kashmir.

Agricultural universities by state
State	Agricultural universities
Andhra Pradesh	3
Assam	2
Bihar	3
Chhattisgarh	2
Delhi	1
Gujarat	5
Haryana	4
Himachal Pradesh	2
Jammu and Kashmir	2
Jharkhand	1
Karnataka	6
Kerala	3
Madhya Pradesh	3
Maharashtra	6
Manipur	1
Odisha	1
Punjab	2
Rajasthan	6
Tamil Nadu	3
Telangana	3
Uttar Pradesh	7
Uttarakhand	2
West Bengal	3
Total	71

== Andhra Pradesh ==
- ANGRAU, Guntur
- DYSRHU, Venkataramannagudem, Tadepalligudem
- SVVU, Tirupati

== Assam ==
- AAU, Jorhat
- AVFU, Khanapara, Guwahati

== Bihar ==
- BAU, Bhagalpur
- BASU, Patna
- DRPCAU, Samastipur (Note: Central agricultural university)

== Chhattisgarh ==
- Chhattisgarh Kamdhenu Vishwavidyalaya, Durg
- Indira Gandhi Krishi Vishwavidyalaya, Raipur
- Mahatma Gandhi University of Horticulture and Forestry, Durg

== Delhi ==
- IARI

== Gujarat ==
- Anand Agricultural University, Anand
- Junagadh Agricultural University, Junagadh
- Navsari Agricultural University, Navsari
- Sardarkrushinagar Dantiwada Agricultural University, Banaskantha
- Kamdhenu University, Gandhinagar

== Haryana ==
- CCSHAU, Hisar
- LLRUVAS, Hisar
- MPHU, Karnal (Note: Listed as "Haryana State University of Horticultural Sciences, Karnal".)
- NDRI, Karnal (Note: Deemed university)
- Geeta University, Panipat

== Himachal Pradesh ==
- Chaudhary Sarwan Kumar Himachal Pradesh Krishi Vishvavidyalaya, Palampur
- Dr. Yashwant Singh Parmar University of Horticulture and Forestry, Solan

== Jammu and Kashmir ==
- Sher-e-Kashmir UAST of Jammu, Jammu
- Sher-e-Kashmir UAST of Kashmir, Srinagar

== Jharkhand ==
- Birsa Agricultural University, Kanke

== Karnataka ==
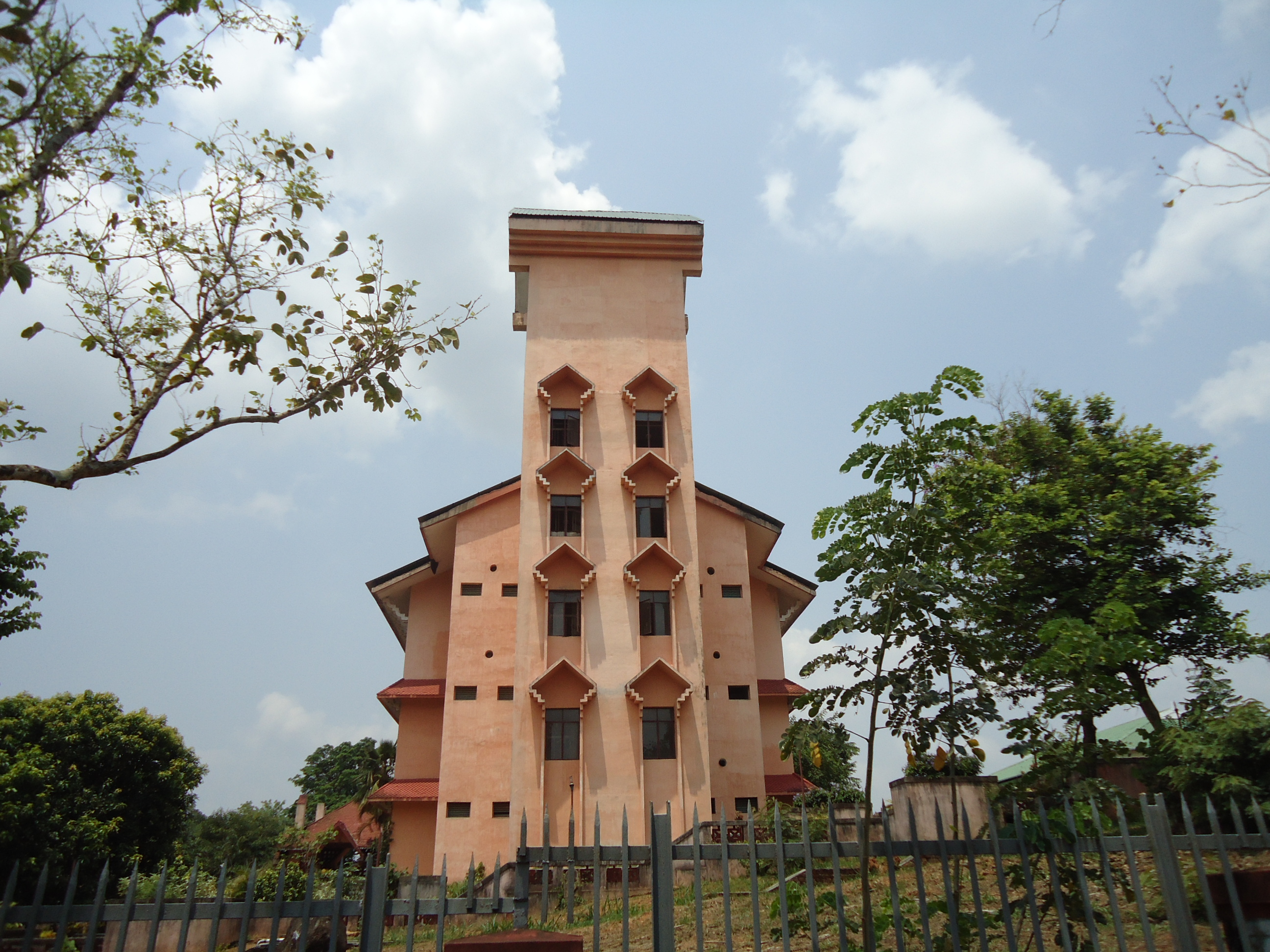
Kerala Agricultural University library

- KVAFU, Bidar
- UAHS Shimoga
- UAS Bangalore
- UAS Dharwad
- UAS Raichur
- UHS Bagalkot

== Kerala ==
- KAU, Vellanikkara, Thrissur
- KUFOS, Kochi
- KVASU, Wayanad

== Madhya Pradesh ==
- JNKVV, Jabalpur
- NDVSU, Jabalpur
- RVSKVV, Gwalior
- VIKRAM Vishwa Vidyalaya, [UJJAIN]

== Maharashtra ==
- CIFE, Mumbai
- DBSKKV, Dapoli
- DPDKV, Akola
- MAFSU, Nagpur
- MPKV, Rahuri
- VNMKV, Parbhani

== Manipur ==
- CAU, Imphal

== Odisha ==
- OUAT, Bhubaneswar

== Punjab ==
- GADVASU, Ludhiana
- PAU, Ludhiana

== Rajasthan ==
- AU, Jodhpur
- AU Kota, Kota
- MPUAT, Udaipur
- RUVAS, Bikaner
- SKNAU, Jobner
- SKRAU, Bikaner

== Tamil Nadu ==
- TNAU, Coimbatore
- TNJFU, Nagapattinam
- TANUVAS, Madhavaram, Chennai

== Telangana ==
- PVNRTVU, Hyderabad
- PJTSAU, Hyderabad
- SKLTSHU, Hyderabad

== Uttar Pradesh ==
- Chandra Shekhar Azad University of Agriculture and Technology, Kanpur
- Indian Veterinary Research Institute, Bareilly
- Narendra Deva University of Agriculture and Technology, Ayodhya
- Rani Lakshmi Bai Central Agricultural University, Jhansi
- Sam Higginbottom University of Agriculture Technology and Sciences, Prayagraj
- Mahatma Bhuddha Agriculture & Technology University Kushinagar
- Mangalayatan University, Aligarh

== Uttarakhand ==
- GBPUAT, Pantnagar
- VCSGUUHF, Pauri Garhwal

== West Bengal ==
- BCKV, Mohanpur
- UBKV, Cooch Behar
- WBUAFS, Kolkata

== See also ==
- Agricultural Universities (India)
- List of agricultural universities and colleges
- List of forestry universities and colleges
- List of universities in India
