= Indian Agricultural Universities Association =

Agricultural society based in India

The Indian Agricultural Universities Association or IAUA is a registered Indian society based in New Delhi which aims to promote agricultural research, education and extension in universities and states.

== List of members ==
=== Institution of National Importance ===
- Rani Lakshmi Bai Central Agricultural University

=== Central Universities ===
- Central Agricultural University

=== Deemed Universities ===
- National Dairy Research Institute
- Indian Agricultural Research Institute
- Indian Veterinary Research Institute
- Central Institute of Fisheries Education

=== State Universities ===
- Acharya N.G. Ranga Agricultural University
- Assam Agricultural University
- Banda University of Agriculture and Technology
- Dr. Balasaheb Sawant Konkan Krishi Vidyapeeth
- Birsa Agricultural University
- Bidhan Chandra Krishi Viswavidyalaya
- Chaudhary Charan Singh Haryana Agricultural University
- Chandra Shekhar Azad University of Agriculture and Technology
- Chaudhary Sarwan Kumar Himachal Pradesh Krishi Vishvavidyalaya
- Sardarkrushinagar Dantiwada Agricultural University
- Govind Ballabh Pant University of Agriculture & Technology
- Indira Gandhi Krishi Vishwa Vidyalaya
- Jawaharlal Nehru Agricultural University
- Kerala Agricultural University
- Marathwada Agricultural University
- Mahatma Phule Krishi Vidyapeeth
- Maharana Pratap University of Agriculture and Technology
- Narendra Dev University of Agriculture and Technology
- Orissa University of Agriculture and Technology
- Dr. Panjabrao Deshmukh Krishi Vidyapeeth
- Punjab Agricultural University
- Rajendra Agricultural University
- Rajasthan Agricultural University
- Sam Higginbottom University of Agriculture, Technology and Sciences
- Sher-e-Kashmir University of Agricultural Sciences and Technology
- Sher-e-Kashmir University of Agricultural Sciences and Technology
- Tamil Nadu Agricultural University
- Tamil Nadu Veterinary and Animal Sciences University
- University of Agricultural Sciences
- University of Agricultural Sciences
- West Bengal University of Animal and Fishery Sciences
- Dr. Yashwant Singh Parmar University of Horticulture and Forestry
- Maharashtra Animal and Fishery Sciences University
- Uttar Banga Krishi Viswa Vidyalaya
- Sardar Vallabhbhai Patel University of Agriculture and Technology
- Uttar Pradesh Pandit Deen Dayal Upadhyaya Pashu Chikitsa Vigyan Vishwavidyalaya Evam Go Anusandhan Sansthan
- Navsari Agricultural University
- Anand Agricultural University
- Junagadh Agricultural University
- Guru Angad Dev Veterinary and Animal Sciences University
- Sri Venkateswara Veterinary University
- Karnataka Veterinary, Animal and Fisheries Sciences University
- Rajmata Vijayaraje Scindia Krishi Vishwavidyalaya
- University of Agricultural Sciences
- University of Horticultural Sciences, Bagalkot
- Bihar Agricultural University
- Uttarakhand University of Horticulture and Forestry
- Kerala Veterinary and Animal Sciences University
- National Backward Krishi Vidyapeeth, Solapur
