= College of Technology, Pantnagar =

College in Uttarakhand, India

College of Technology
- Type: Public
- Established: 1962(1966)
- Chancellor: Lt. Gen. (Retd.) Gurmit Singh
- Vice-Chancellor: Dr. Manmohan Singh Chauhan
- Dean: Dr. S S Gupta
- Location: Pantnagar, Uttarakhand, India; 28°58′N 79°25′E
- Campus: Rural
- Website: www.gbpuat-tech.ac.in

College of Technology, Pantnagar also known as COT, Pantnagar or COT, is a college located in Pantnagar, in the state of Uttarakhand, India. It was established under the then Uttar Pradesh Agricultural University and now called Govind Ballabh Pant University of Agriculture & Technology. The College of Technology was established in this university in 1962.

It has eleven departments that offer eight Bachelor of Technology (B. Tech.) degree programmes. The college also offers 24 postgraduate programs including a self-financed MCA program.

The College is an institute in the world bank project for Technical Education Quality Improvement Program (TEQIP) and is also the Regional Academy Centre of CISCO. The institute also holds ISO 9001:2000 certification.

The college receives financial aid from various sources including All India Council of Technical Education (AICTE), University Grants Commission (UGC), Department of Science and Technology (DST), Indian Council of Agricultural Research (ICAR) and the Council of Scientific and Industrial Research (CSIR) in addition to aid from the Department of Higher Education, Government of Uttarakhand.

== Mission ==
The mission of College of Technology are as follows:

1. Produce engineers with the strong education foundation and the adaptive skills to serve rapidly evolving technological industries.

2. Conduct nationally recognized technical research focused at providing a technological edge to India, in general, and Uttarakhand in particular

3. Develop appropriate technologies for the upliftment for rural areas of Uttarakhand

4. Provide a diverse curricula that will instill in the students the imagination, talent, creativity and skills necessary for rapidly changing requirements for modern life and to enable them to serve in a wide variety of other fields that require leadership, teamwork, decision making and problem solving abilities.

== Administration and organization ==
In the Indian higher education system, Pantnagar is classified as a State Agricultural University (SAU). The university is in the jurisdiction of the state government. The Governor of the state is ex-officio Chancellor of the university and (s)he appoints a Vice-chancellor (VC), who functions as a full-time Chief executive of the university. The VC chairs a 13-membered Board of Management, which is the highest executive body of the university and oversees primarily financial and administrative matters and ratifies recommendations of other councils of the university. The other councils are the Academic council, the Research council and the Extension education council. Governor of Uttarakhand Lt. Gen. (Retd.) Gurmit Singh is present Chancellor and Dr. Manmohan Singh Chauhan is VC of the university.

Recently, a central government committee — The Committee to Advise on Renovation and Rejuvenation of Higher Education (Yashpal Committee, 2009) — has recommended converting agricultural universities into general universities encompassing all branches of studies.

== Academics ==
Each academic year comprises two semester having a total of 200-210 instructional days. COT follows the credit-based system of performance evaluation, with proportional weighting of courses based on their importance. Completion of a degree program requires successful study of courses as approved by the Academic Council for a program. The university has a 10-point scale evaluation system. Each student is evaluation in each course throughout the semester. Each semester's evaluation is done independently with a cumulative grade point average (CGPA) reflecting the average performance across semesters. The medium of instruction is English.

=== Undergraduate education ===
The College of Technology has various departments that offer eight B. Tech. Degree Programs in Agricultural Engineering, Civil Engineering, Computer Engineering, Electrical Engineering, Electronics and Communication Engineering, Information Technology, Mechanical Engineering and Industrial and Production Engineering. The B.Tech. Degree Program is the program with the most students enrolled in it in the college.

=== Postgraduate and doctoral education ===
COT Pantnagar offers 24 postgraduate programmes, including Master of Technology (M.Tech.) and Master of Computer Applications (M.C.A.). The admission to M.Tech. program is made through GATE (Graduate Aptitude Test in Engineering) exam conducted by IITs and IISc, Bangalore. The institute offers the Doctor of Philosophy degree (Ph.D.) as part of its doctoral education programme in several disciplines. The doctoral scholars are given a topic of academic interest by the professor, or sometimes work on the consultancy projects sponsored by industries. The duration of the programme is usually unspecified. Ph.D. scholars submit a dissertation and conduct an oral defence of their thesis.

The departments of COT Pantnagar are as follows:

- Department of Civil Engineering
- Department of Computer Engineering
- Department of Electrical Engineering
- Department of Electronics and Communication Engineering
- Department of Farm Machinery and Power Engineering
- Department of Information Technology
- Department of Irrigation and Drainage Engineering
- Department of Mechanical Engineering
- Department of Post Harvest Process and Food Engineering
- Department of Industrial and Production Engineering
- Department of Soil and Water Conservation Engineering

== Centre of Excellence ==
Under Technical Education Quality Improvement Programme (TEQIP), Department of Higher Education has designated the institute as a Centre of Excellence for Energy Studies in Industries and Agro Systems of Uttarakhand (Energy Management).

== Campus ==
College of Technology has a campus area in G.B. Pant University of Agriculture and Technology University.

The university campus is located at a distance of 250 km from Delhi in Udham Singh Nagar district of Uttarakhand. The nearby towns are Rudrapur (16 km), Haldwani (25 km) and Nainital (65 km). Two National Highways- NH 87 and Bareilly- Nainital highway- are near the campus. Pantnagar Airport, operated by Airports Authority of India is located in the campus, 2.5 km west of main administrative building. Two railway stations of North Eastern Railways- Pantnagar (IR Code PBW) and Haldi Road (IR Code HLDD) are located in the campus 4 km (east) and 3 km (west) respectively of administrative building. The university shuttle service, local rickshaws, auto-rickshaws and matador vans connect various parts of the campus. Pantnagar is a purely residential university and comprises an independent township in itself. The population of Pantnagar, prior to establishment of the industrial estate was 35,820 at the Census of 2001. Pantnagar is a part of Pantnagar- Gadarpur assembly constituency. The 'Concentric semicircles' or the 'rising sun' plan of the campus-centre was developed by the Department of Architecture of Illinois University.

== Student life ==
COT Pantnagar provides on-campus residential facilities to its students, research scholars, faculty members and staff. The students live in hostels (referred to as bhavans) throughout their stay in the COT.

=== Student organizations ===
Most of the student's activities are organized through college-level professional societies, like the SAEINDIA COT COLLEGIATE CLUB PANTNAGAR and THE ROBOTICS CLUB PANTNAGAR, tech-fairs and various competitions year round. The festivals include LITROSPHERE, the Annual Science and Literary Fest, ACCOLADE, the annual cultural and fine arts fest and COLOSSEUM, the annual tech fest. Apart from these, there are branch chapters for all the departments like Plexus, Interface, Mech Chap, Sprinkler and Genesis.

The institute has a college editorial board, popularly known as the Ed-Board, which looks after the various student publications of the institute. The College Website Team maintains the college website, and other relevant activities.

The college also has the COT Chapter for the Indian Society of Technical Education (ISTE), the Imagindia Chapter, SAEINDIA Collegiate Club and the College Robotics Club. The college actively participates in various International and National Robotics Competition along with BAJA, Supra and Effi-cycle contests organized by SAEINDIA.

There are other university-level societies like Vivekanand Swadhyaya Mandal and Sanskritic Chetna Parishad which works for social causes. CHETNA student wing works to benefit poor children on the campus.

The Pantnagar Chapter of SPIC MACAY regularly organizes Indian classical music and dance concerts.

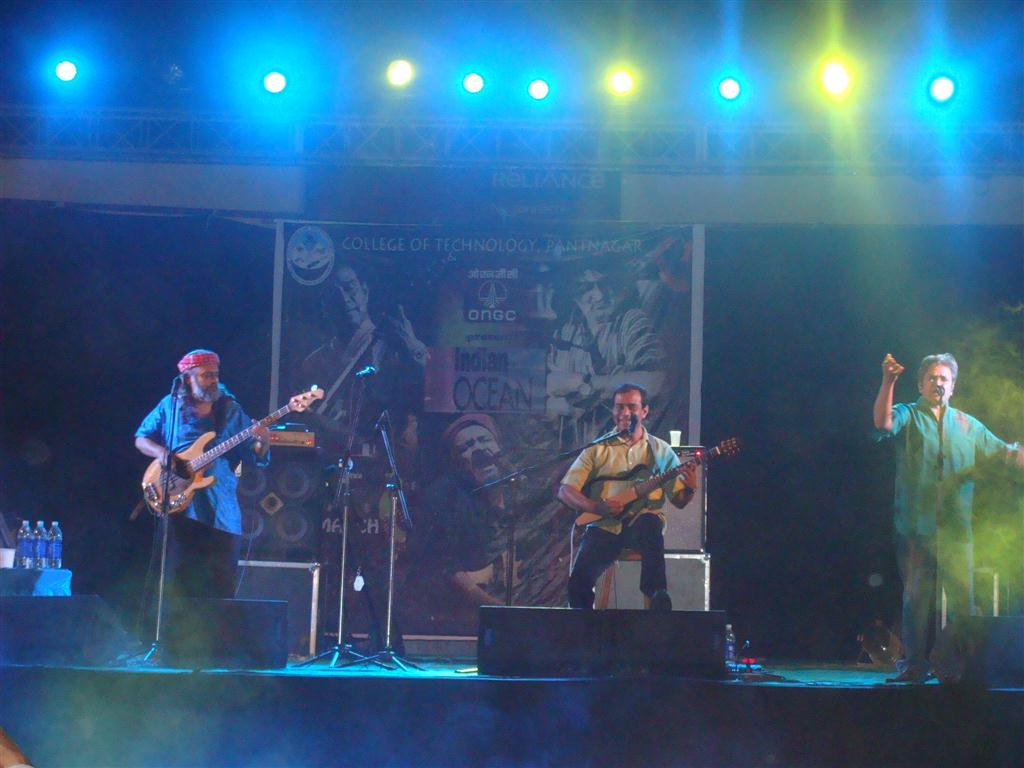
Indian Ocean performing at Colosseum 2011

== Alumni network ==
=== Pantnagar Technology Alumni Association (P.T.A.A.) ===
Pantnagar Technology Alumni Association (P.T.A.A.) is a registered society established in 2005 by the initiatives of the Ex Vice-Chancellor Dr. P.L. Gautam, Ex-dean and Late Dr. K. N. Shukla and the alumni of College of Technology. As of 2012 the association has successfully registered around 1,000 members.

== Notable alumni ==
- Vineet Nayar
- Baba Sehgal
- Shantanu Gupta

== See also ==
- G. B. Pant University of Agriculture and Technology
- Pantnagar
