= Sri Konda Laxman Telangana State Horticultural University =

Agricultural university in Hyderabad, India

- Type: Public
- Established: 2014; 12 years ago
- Affiliations: UGC, ICAR
- Chancellor: Governor of Telangana
- Vice-Chancellor: Raji Reddy
- Location: Hyderabad, Telangana, India
- Website: skltshu.ac.in

Sri Konda Laxman Telangana State Horticultural University (SKLTSHU) is a state agricultural university located at Budwel, Hyderabad, Telangana, India, focusing on horticulture research and education. It was established in 2014 by the Government of Telangana by bifurcating the Dr. Y.S.R. Horticultural University. The university has two constituent colleges, the College of Horticulture, Mojerla in Mahbubnagar district and the College of Horticulture, Rajendranagar in Hyderabad district.
