= R.K. Malhotra =

Indian businessman (born 1947)

- Born: Rajinder Kumar Malhotra; 15 July 1947 (age 78); India
- Occupation: Businessman
- Known for: Chief Executive and President of Indofil Industries
- Spouse: Madhu Malhotra
- Children: 2 (Loveena Saigal and Yuvraj Malhotra)
- Relatives: Manju Dhawan
- Website: Indofil official website

R.K. Malhotra, (born 15 July 1947) is an Indian business executive associated with the agricultural chemicals industry. He has been the Chief Executive and President of Indofil Industries Limited since 1994. Malhotra heads Indofil, which is a part of K.K. Modi’s conglomerate with diverse business interests in tobacco, chemicals, entertainment, education and other sectors.

== Early life and education ==
Malhotra was born on 15 July 1947 in Delhi. His parents — a former soldier, the late Shri. Raghubirnath and the late Smt. Kailash Kumari had four children. Malhotra graduated (B.Sc. Ag.) from the University of Udaipur and completed his Post Graduation - M.Sc. in Plant Pathology from the prestigious G. B. Pant University of Agriculture & Technology, Pantnagar in 1971.

== Career ==
The Indian Agricultural Research Institute (IARI) in New Delhi was the first step in Malhotra's professional life. After earning his stripes at IARI for two years, he joined Indofil in 1973 in the sales department. During his early time at Indofil, he focused on expanding the company's market share by visiting remote villages and engaging directly with farmers, helping the organization establish a strong foundation in the agricultural sector. In 1994, he was named as the Chief Executive. During his time at the helm of affairs at Indofil, Malhotra oversaw revenue growth of over 600% from Rs.130 Crores in 1994 to Rs.1,023 Crores in 2012. One of his major decisions after becoming the Chief Executive of the company was to launch the International Business Division in 1995. The company now has a presence in 92 countries.

In 2012, he facilitated a joint venture— Indo Baijin Chemicals with Chinese company Shanghai Baijin Chemical Group for manufacturing green energy CS2. Continuing in the collaborative spirit, Indofil acquired the right to conduct business in Europe for Dithane fungicide from Dow AgroSciences LLC. The company was recognised as the "Best Company from an Emerging Region" at the AGROW awards, London, in 2010.

== Recognition ==
- Lifetime Achievement award from Cotton Research & Development Association (CRDA)— 2012.
- Outstanding Executive of the decade award from the Unity International Foundation— 2010-11

== Personal life ==
Malhotra is married to Madhu and has two children.
