= Sher-e-Kashmir University of Agricultural Sciences and Technology =

Former agricultural university in Srinagar, India

- Active: 1982–1998-99
- Location: Srinagar, Jammu and Kashmir, India

Sher-e-Kashmir University of Agricultural Sciences and Technology (SKUAST) was an Agricultural University in the Indian union territory of Jammu and Kashmir. It was established in the year 1982 and named after Kashmiri leader Sheikh Mohammad Abdullah who is popularly known as Sher-e-Kashmir.

Initially, the university had jurisdiction over the entire State of Jammu and Kashmir with its headquarters at Srinagar. The agricultural education, research and extension training units were transferred to SKUAST from various development departments of the Jammu and Kashmir State.

In the year 1998–99, the territorial jurisdiction of the university was redefined by amending the SKUAST Act 1982 under which a separate agricultural university was established for the Jammu Division and named as Sher-e-Kashmir University of Agricultural Sciences and Technology of Jammu (SKUAST-J) with its territorial jurisdiction extended to the entire Jammu Division. The parent University was renamed as Sher-e-Kashmir University of Agricultural Sciences and Technology of Kashmir (SKUAST-K)
