= College of Agriculture, Pantnagar =

Agricultural school in Pantnagar, India

Coordinates: 29.0238°N 79.4841°E

The College of Agriculture, Pantnagar, India, is a constituent of Govind Ballabh Pant University of Agriculture & Technology, Pantnagar. It was opened on 17 November 1960 when Jawaharlal Nehru, the first Prime Minister of India, inaugurated the university. It has a triple mandate of teaching, research and extension.

The college has more than 200 faculty members engaged in agricultural sciences. The college has played a role in the Green Revolution in the country. More than 185 varieties of crops like cereals, pulses, oilseeds, forages, fruits and vegetables have been released. The 4 year Bachelor of Science in Agriculture (BScAg) is the flagship course of the college.

== Departments ==
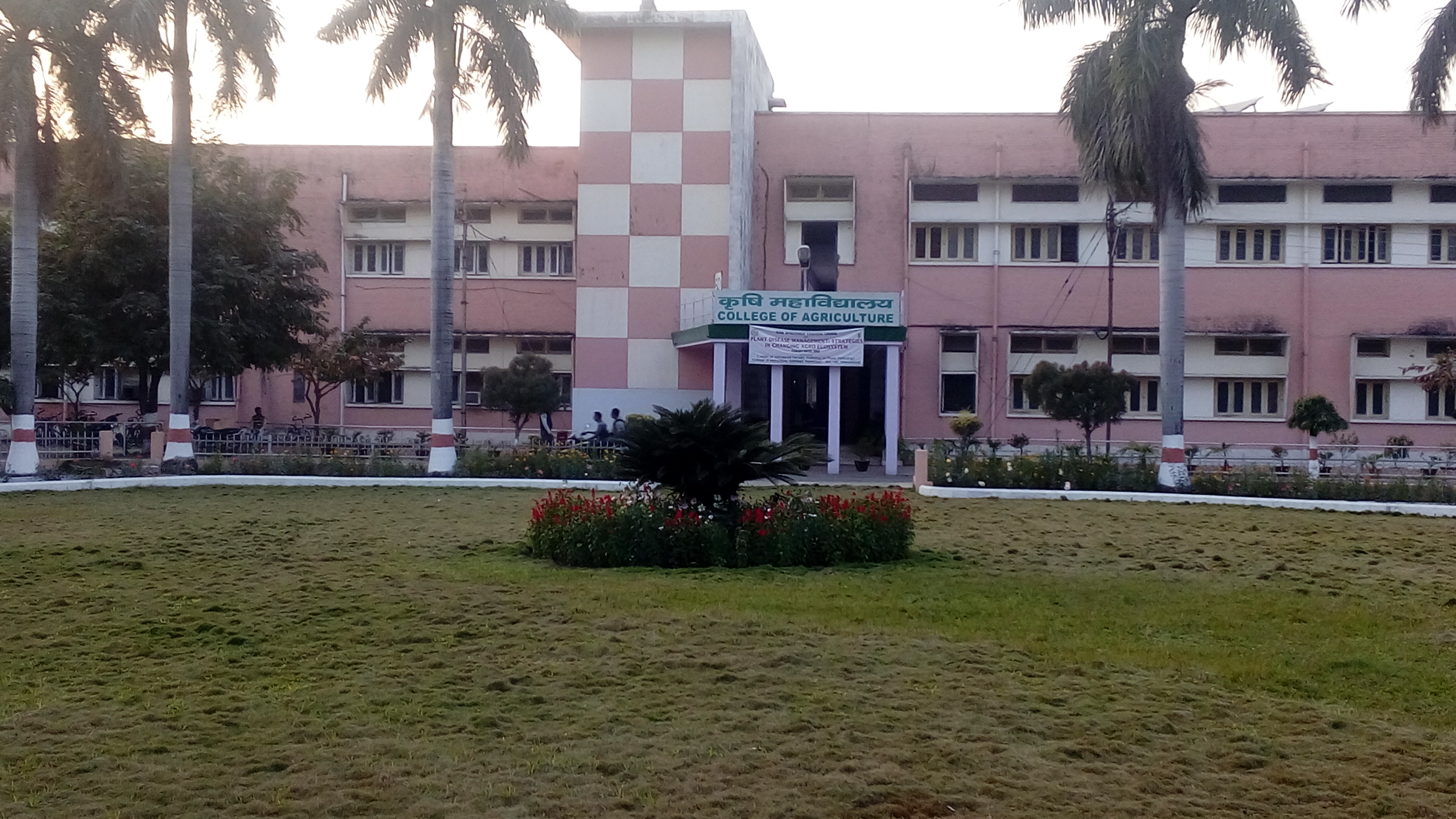
College of Agriculture, Pantnagar

The college has twelve departments:

- Agronomy (ICAR Centre for Advanced Study)
- Agricultural communication
- Agricultural Economics
- Agrometerology
- Entomology
- Food Science and Technology
- Genetics and Plant Breeding
- Horticulture
- Plant Pathology (ICAR Centre for Advanced Study)
- Soil Science
- Vegetable Science
- Seed Science and Technology

Earlier, the college also included two departments of Animal Nutrition, and Animal Breeding and Genetics, which were subsequently transferred to College of Veterinary and Animal Sciences.
