= Akhil Chandra Banerjea =

Indian virologist (born 1956)

- Born: 1956 (age 69–70); West Bengal, India
- Education: Gorakhpur University; G. B. Pant University; National Institute of Virology; Savitribai Phule Pune University; Duke University Hospital; Colorado State University
- Known for: Studies on viral pathogenesis and gene therapy
- Awards: 2001 N-BIOS Prize; 2016 INSA; DBT National Foreign-Assocaiateship; ICMR Shakuntala Amir Chand Award
- Scientific career
- Fields: Molecular biology; Biochemistry
- Workplaces: National Institutes of Health; National Institute of Immunology, India

Akhil Chandra Banerjea (born 1956) is an Indian virologist and is currently the Director at Institute of Advanced Virology, Kerala. He was earlier an emeritus Scientist at the National Institute of Immunology, India. Known for his studies on viral pathogenesis and gene therapy, Banerjea is an elected fellow of the National Academy of Sciences, India and the Indian National Science Academy. The Department of Biotechnology of the Government of India awarded him the National Bioscience Award for Career Development, one of the highest Indian science awards, for his contributions to biosciences in 2001.

== Biography ==
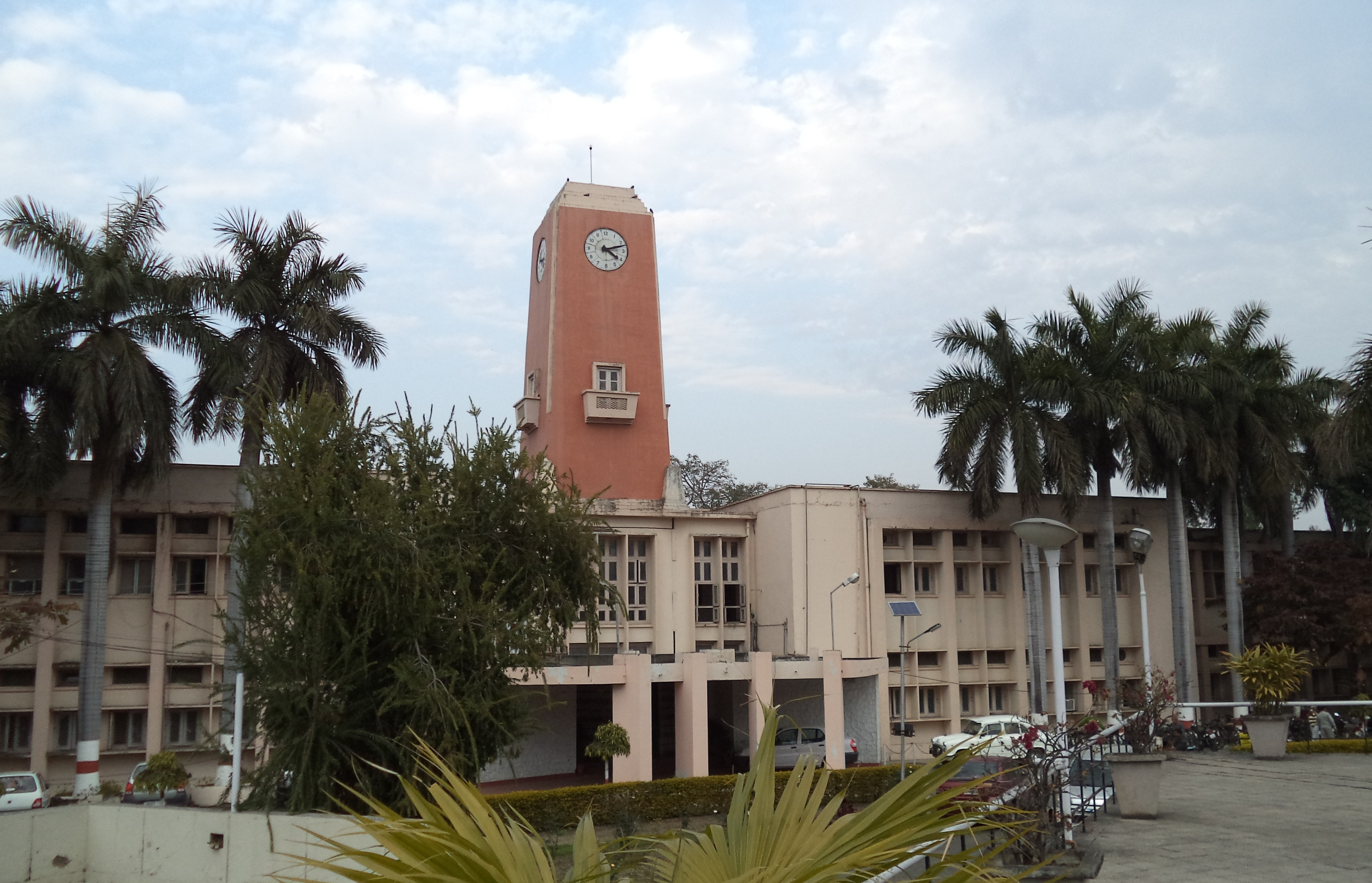
G. B. Pant University

Akhil C. Banerjea, born in 1956 in the Indian state of West Bengal, did his under-graduate studies at Gorakhpur University and after earning a BSc, he continued his studies at G. B. Pant University of Agriculture and Technology to obtain a master's degree (MSc). Subsequently, he joined National Institute of Virology for his doctoral research in virology which earned him a PhD from Savitribai Phule Pune University. His post-doctoral work was in the US where he did research at Duke University Hospital, simultaneously working as an assistant professor from 1984 to 1990 and spent the next four years (1990–94) at the National Institutes of Health as a senior staff fellow. On his return to India, he joined the National Institute of Immunology and chaired the department of virology for a while. After superannuation from service, he continues his association with the institute as an emeritus Scientist. In between, he had a two-year stint at Colorado State University as a visiting professor during 2002–04.

== Legacy ==
Banerjea's research has been focusing on HIV/AIDS with special emphasis on the pathogenesis, host-gene interactions and the genetic as well as the functional characterization of HIV-1. He worked on developing catalytic nucleic acids for antiviral uses and later, at Colorado State University, his research was centered around conversion of Small interfering RNA (siRNA) into stem cells which was reported inn 2003 by The New York Times; the approach was subsequently put on clinical trial in the US. He has also worked on the effect of lentiviral vectors, stem cells, catalytic nucleic acids and siRNA for developing gene therapy against HIV/AIDS as well as the study of host or viral genes in understanding the HIV/AIDS pathogenesis. His studies have been documented by way of a number of articles and ResearchGate, an online repository of scientific articles, has listed 103 of them. He has delivered key note or invited speeches at seminars and conferences at places such as Albert Einstein College of Medicine, Duke University, University of California, Los Angeles, National Cancer Institute, Drexel University and National University of Singapore. He has also mentored many research scholars in their studies.

== Awards and honors ==
The Department of Biotechnology of the Government of India awarded Banerjea the National Bioscience Award for Career Development, one of the highest Indian science awards in 2001. The same year, he was elected as a fellow by the National Academy of Sciences, India. He is also a recipient of the National Foreign-Associateship of the Department of Biotechnology and the Shakuntala Amir Chand Award of the Indian Council of Medical Research. The Indian National Science Academy elected him as a fellow in 2012; INSA would honor him again in 2016 with the Senior Scientist Award.

== Selected bibliography ==
- Swagata Roy; Nidhi Gupta; Nithya Subramanian; Tanmoy Mondal; Akhil Chandra Banerjea; Saumitra Das (2008). "Sequence-specific cleavage of hepatitis C virus RNA by DNAzymes: inhibition of viral RNA translation and replication". Journal of General Virology. 89 (7): 1579–1586. doi:10.1099/vir.0.83650-0. PMID 18559927.
- Lata S, Ali A, Sood V, Raja R, Banerjea AC (2015). "HIV-1 Rev downregulates Tat expression and viral replication via modulation of NAD(P)H:quinine oxidoreductase 1 (NQO1)". Nat. Commun. 6 (7244) 7244. Bibcode:2015NatCo...6.7244L. doi:10.1038/ncomms8244. PMID 26059226.
- Rameez Raja; Larance Ronsard; Sneh Lata; Shubhendu Trivedi; Akhil C. Banerjea (2017). "HIV-1 Tat potently stabilises Mdm2 and enhances viral replication". Biochem. J. 474 (14): 2449–2464. doi:10.1042/BCJ20160825. PMC 5509382. PMID 28468838.
- Larance Ronsard; Tripti Rai; Devesh Rai; Vishnampettai G Ramachandran; Akhil C Banerjea (2017). "In silico Analyses of Subtype Specific HIV-1 Tat-TAR RNA Interaction Reveals the Structural Determinants for Viral Activity". Front Microbiol. 8 (8): 1467. doi:10.3389/fmicb.2017.01467. PMC 5550727. PMID 28848502.
- Larance Ronsard; Nilanjana Ganguli; Vivek K Singh; Kumaravel Mohankumar; Tripti Rai; Subhashree Sridharan; Sankar Pajaniradje; Binod Kumar; Devesh Rai; Suhnrita Chaudhuri; Mohane S Coumar; Vishnampettai G Ramachandran; Akhil C Banerjea (2017). "Impact of Genetic Variations in HIV-1 Tat on LTR-Mediated Transcription via TAR RNA Interaction". Front Microbiol. 8 (8): 706. doi:10.3389/fmicb.2017.00706. PMC 5399533. PMID 28484443.

== See also ==
- RNA interference
- Gene knockdown
