= Sher-e-Kashmir University of Agricultural Sciences and Technology of Kashmir =

Agricultural university in Srinagar, India

- Latin: Leo Kashmir Universitas Scientiarum Agricultural et Technologiae
- Other name: Agricultural University
- Type: Government
- Established: 1982; 44 years ago
- Founder: Government of Jammu and Kashmir
- Accreditation: IARI, VCI
- Chancellor: Lieutenant Governor of Jammu and Kashmir
- Vice-Chancellor: Dr. Nazir Ahmed Ganai
- Total staff: 2344
- Students: 3000
- Undergraduates: 1100
- Postgraduates: 600
- Doctoral students: 133
- Location: Srinagar
- Campus: Multi Campus Urban
- Language: Koshur, Urdu, English
- Website: skuastkashmir.ac.in

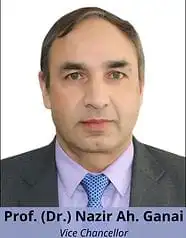
Vice Chancellor

Sher-e-Kashmir University of Agricultural Sciences and Technology of Kashmir (SKUAST-K) is an agricultural university located in Shalimar, Srinagar, Jammu and Kashmir, India. With its main campus and Faculty of Horticulture in Shalimar, Srinagar, the university has multiple campuses, colleges, research and extension centers across the Kashmir Valley and Ladakh Union Territory. The Faculty of Agriculture (FoA) is located in Wadura, Sopore

and the Faculty of Veterinary Sciences and Animal Husbandry (F.V.Sc & A.H) campus is located in Shuhama, Alusteng, Ganderbal.

== History ==
The university was founded in 1982 by an Act passed by the State Legislature of Jammu and Kashmir. It was named after Kashmiri leader Sheikh Mohammad Abdullah who is popularly known as Sher-e-Kashmir (Lion of Kashmir). The name given to the university was "Sher-e-Kashmir University of Agricultural Sciences and Technology" (SKUAST).

Initially, the university had jurisdiction over the entire State of Jammu and Kashmir with its headquarters at Shalimar, Srinagar. When the SKUAST Act came in force, the agricultural education, research and extension training units were transferred to SKUAST from various development departments viz; Agriculture, Animal Husbandry, Sheep Husbandry and Sericulture of Jammu and Kashmir State.

In 1998–99, the territorial jurisdiction of the university was redefined by amending the SKUAST Act 1982 under which a separate agricultural University was established for Jammu Division and named as Sher-e-Kashmir University of Agricultural Sciences and Technology of Jammu (SKUAST-J) with its territorial jurisdiction extended to the entire Jammu Division. The parent University was renamed Sher-e-Kashmir University of Agricultural Sciences and Technology of Kashmir.

== Establishment of the university ==
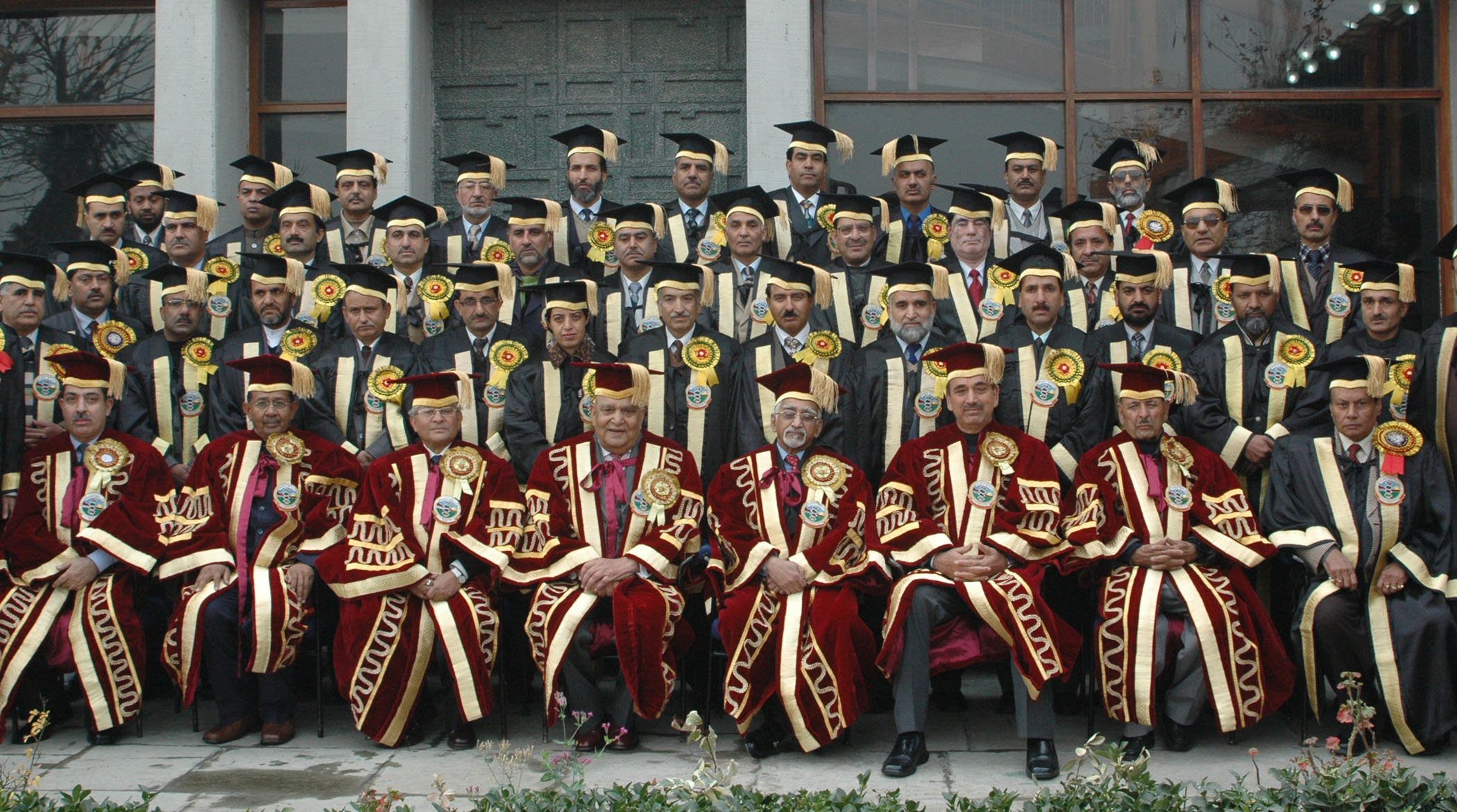
The Vice President, Mohammad Hamid Ansari at a group photograph with the members of the Academic Council, the Board of Management, the University Council, the Vice-Chancellor

In 1979, the expert team of Indian Council of Agricultural Research (ICAR) on the proposal of state government recommended the establishment of an agricultural university for the advancement of the agricultural sector in the state. The Act for the establishment of a university under the name and style of Sher-e-Kashmir University of Agricultural Sciences and Technology was passed by the State Legislature in the 33rd year of the Republic of India on 31 March 1982 which came into force on 1 August 1982 with its jurisdiction over the entire State of Jammu and Kashmir and headquarters at Shalimar, Srinagar.

With the establishment of Sher-e-Kashmir University of Agricultural Sciences and Technology (SKUAST) named after great patriotic leader Jenab Sheikh Mohammad Abdullah (popularly known as Sher-e-Kashmir) the agricultural education, research and extension training units were transferred to SKUAST from development departments of Jammu and Kashmir State—agriculture, animal husbandry, sheep husbandry and sericulture. The university operates on the Land-Grant College concept following the Model Act of SAUs evolved by ICAR. It is a multicampus university.

It is a matter of satisfaction that coherent research infrastructure, relevant educational base and extension education services have given way to an organised institution of SKUAST, which has taken over the responsibility of supporting the state in its effort to develop its agricultural economy in agriculture and allied sectors. There is no doubt that SKUAST has developed faster than many agricultural universities in the country.

In 1998–99, the territorial jurisdiction of the university was redefined by amending the SKUAST Act 1982 under which a separate agriculture university was established for Jammu Division and named as Sher-e-Kashmir University of Agricultural Sciences and Technology of Jammu (SKUAST-J). Sher-e-Kashmir University of Agricultural Sciences and Technology of Kashmir has jurisdiction over Kashmir Valley and Ladakh comprising two agro-ecological zones. These include

- Mid-high altitude temperate zone namely the Kashmir Valley covering the districts of Anantnag, Budgam, Baramullah, Pulwama, Kupwara, Bandipora, Ganderbal and Srinagar which has annual precipitation of 660 to 1400 mm with an average temperature around 13 °C and the altitude ranging between 1500 and 2500 m amsl.
- Cold-arid region of Ladakh comprising the districts of Leh and Kargil which are cold desert with precipitation around 100–120 mm and altitude 2500–5300 m amsl and temperature fluctuating between +40 and -40 °C.

== Research centers ==
- Ambri Apple Research Centre, Balpora
- Dryland (Karewa) Agriculture Research Station, Budgam
- Highland Agriculture Research and Extension Station, Zanaskar
- Highland Pastoral Systems Research and Extension Station, Nyoma.
- Kargil Apricot Research Centre, Kargil
- Mountain Agriculture Research and Extension Station, Gurez.
- Mountain Agriculture Research and Extension Station, Kargi
- Mountain Crop Research Station, Larnoo
- Mountain Crop Research Station, Sagam
- Mountain Research Centre for Field Crops, Khudwani
- Mountain Livestock Research Institute, Manasbal
- Mountain Research Centre for Sheep and Goat, Shuhama
- Saffron Research Station, Pampore

== Rankings ==
The NIRF (National Institutional Ranking Framework) ranked it 10th among Agriculture institutes in India in 2024.

== Faculties ==
The faculties of the university include the following:

- Faculty of Agriculture, Wadura (Sopore), Baramulla.
- Faculty of Horticulture, Shalimar, Srinagar.
- Faculty of Veterinary Sciences and Animal Husbandry, Shuhama, Ganderbal.
- Faculty of Sericulture, Mirgund, Baramulla (now renamed as College of Temperate Sericulture)
- Faculty of Fisheries, Rangil, Ganderbal.
- Faculty of Forestry, Benhama, Ganderbal.
- College of Agricultural Engineering and Technology, Shalimar, Srinagar

Furthermore, there are KVKs (Krishi Vighan Kendras) in every district which are affiliated with the university.
