= Sudhanshu Vrati =

Indian immunologist and microbiologist

- Born: 19 March 1960 (age 66); Uttar Pradesh, India
- Education: G. B. Pant University of Agriculture and Technology; IIT Delhi; Australian National University; CSIRO
- Known for: Studies in RNA virus replication and vaccine development
- Awards: 2001 VASVIK Industrial Research Award; 2003 N-BIOS Prize; 2005 INSA Professor KP Bhargava Memorial Medal; 2005 AMI Alembic Award; 2006 NASI-Reliance Platinum Jubilee Award; 2010 Australian Alumni Award; 2021 J C Bose National Fellow
- Scientific career
- Fields: Immunology; Microbiology
- Workplaces: National Institute of Immunology; THSTI; Regional Centre for Biotechnology; Pasteur Institute; Bharat Immunologicals and Biologicals Corporation

Sudhanshu Vrati (born 19 March 1960) is an Indian immunologist, microbiologist and the director of the Regional Centre for Biotechnology. Known for his studies in the fields of RNA virus replication and vaccine development, Vrati is an elected fellow of the National Academy of Sciences, India, Indian National Science Academy and the Indian Academy of Sciences. The Department of Biotechnology of the Government of India awarded him the National Bioscience Award for Career Development, one of the highest Indian science awards, for his contributions to biosciences in 2003.

== Biography ==
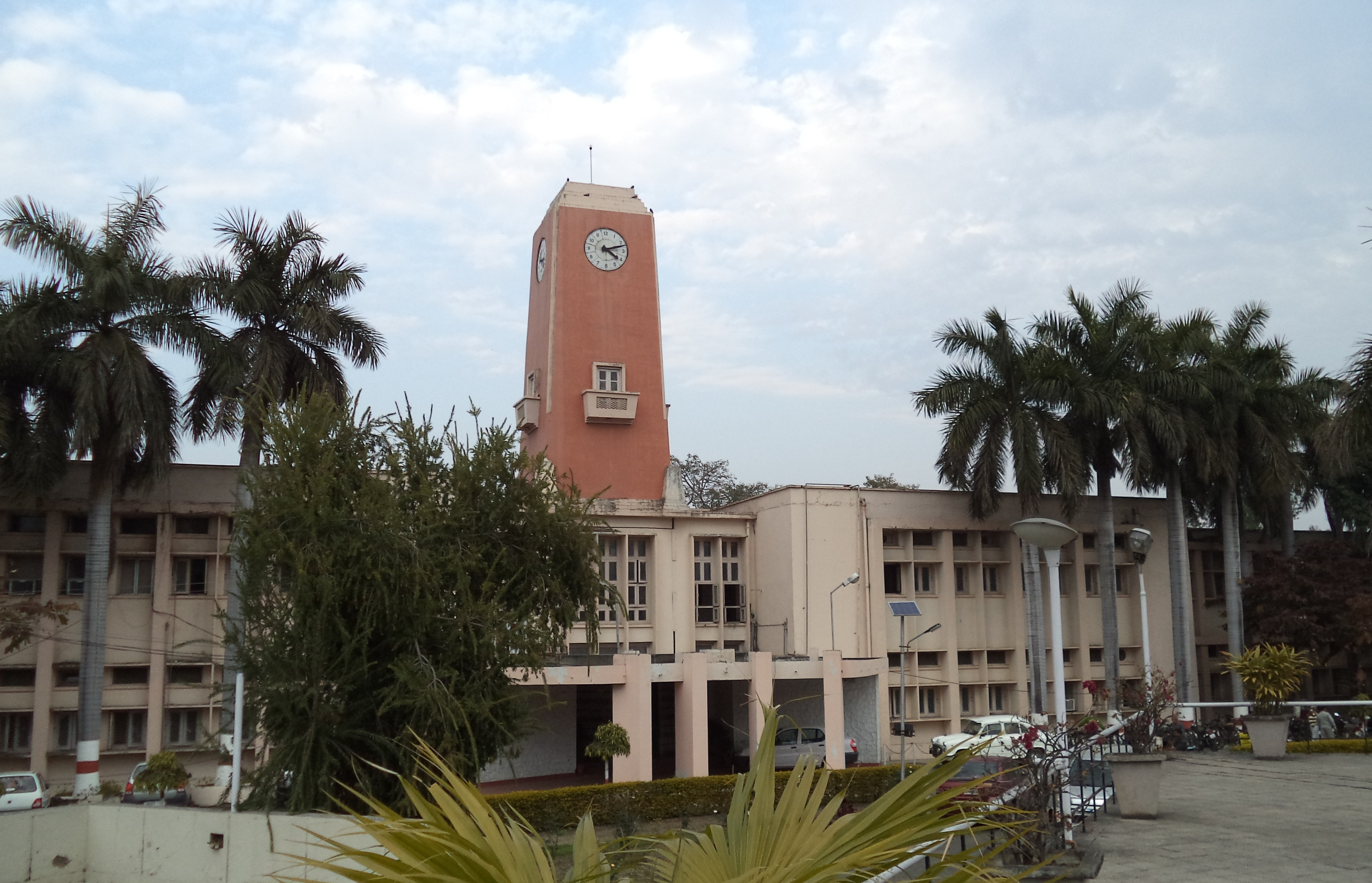
G. B. Pant University of Agriculture and Technology - Office of the vice chancellor

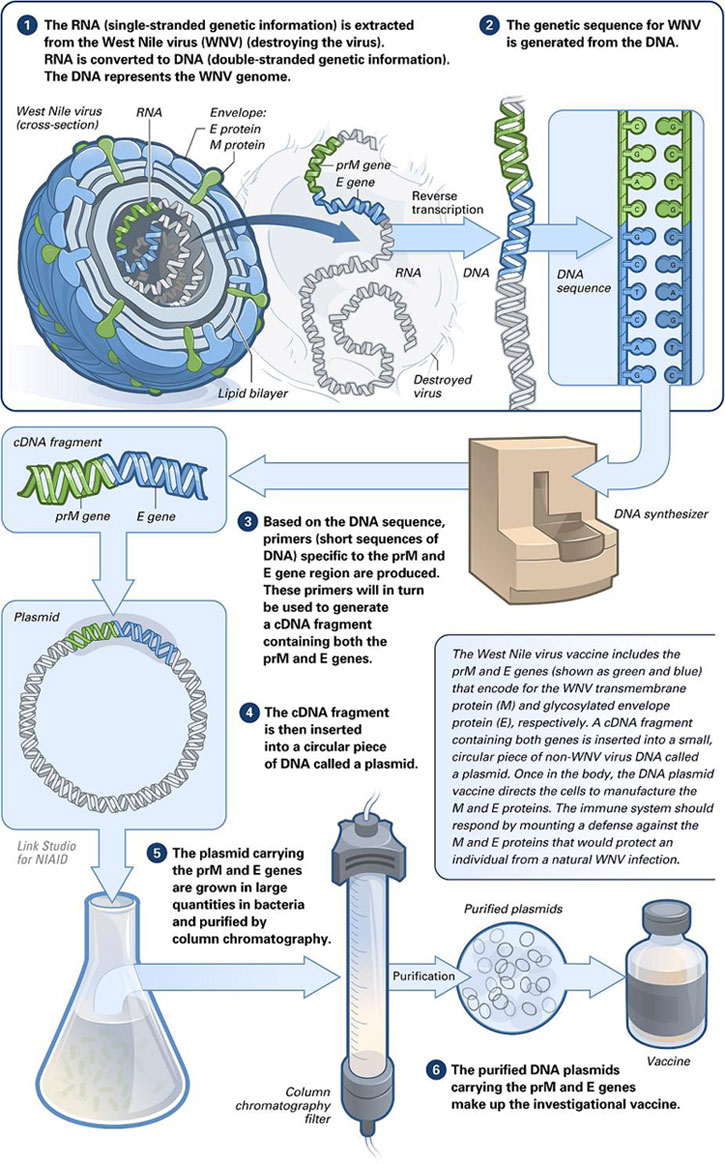
Making of a DNA vaccine

Born on 19 March 1960 in the Indian state of Uttar Pradesh, Sudhanshu Vrati earned an MSc in microbiology from G. B. Pant University of Agriculture and Technology and did a DIIT in biochemical engineering at the Indian Institute of Technology, Delhi. Subsequently, he moved to Australia for his doctoral studies and secured a PhD in biochemistry from the Australian National University. His post-doctoral work was at the Commonwealth Scientific and Industrial Research Organisation (CSIRO) center in Sydney and on his return to India, he joined the National Institute of Immunology as a scientist. He was working as a senior scientist when he was appointed as the dean at the Translational Health Science and Technology Institute (THSTI) in 2005. In October 2015, he was transferred, on deputation, to the Regional Centre for Biotechnology (RCB) as its executive director, a post he held till May 2023. He is also a visiting scientist at the Pasteur Institute, Paris and an executive director of Bharat Immunologicals and Biologicals Corporation, a Government of India undertaking involved in the manufacture of vaccines and immunizers.

== Legacy ==
Vrati's early researches at THSTI focused on JEV life-cycle like receptor binding and entry mechanisms, molecular mechanisms of virus replication, assembly, egress as well as the clinical development of an oral rotavirus vaccine. Later, he concentrated on the development of DNA vaccines and the details of the work has since been published as an article, DNA vaccines: Getting closer to becoming a reality, in 2013. His work on rat brains help identify Mov34 protein which has assisted in the development of vaccines for flaviviral diseases like Japanese encephalitis and Dengue. His studies have been documented by way of a number of articles. (Note: Please see Selected bibliography section) Besides, he has contributed chapters to books edited by others. He holds several patents for the process he has developed.

== Awards and honors ==
It was during his days at the National Institute of Immunology, Vrati received the 2001 VASVIK Industrial Research Award. The Department of Biotechnology of the Government of India awarded him the National Bioscience Award for Career Development, one of the highest Indian science awards in 2003; the elected membership of the Guha Research Conference reached him the same year. He was elected as a fellow by the National Academy of Sciences, India in 2004; the same year as he received the elected fellowship of the Indian Academy of Sciences. The Indian National Science Academy selected him for the Professor KP Bhargava Memorial Medal and the Association of Microbiologists of India chose him for the Alembic Award, both in 2005. The National Academy of Sciences, India honored him again in 2006 with the NASI-Reliance Platinum Jubilee Award. He received the Tata Innovation Fellowship of the Department of Biotechnology in 2009 and the High Commission of Australia in India awarded him the Australian Alumni Award in 2010 The award orations delivered by him include the 2003 edition of the Dr. J. B. Srivastava Oration of the Indian Council of Medical Research. In 2021, he was conferred the prestigious J C Bose National Fellowship of SERB.

== Selected bibliography ==
=== Chapters ===
- Malik Zainul Abdin, Usha Kiran, Kamaluddin, Athar Ali (Eds.); Mohan Babu Appiahgari, Usha Kiran, Athar Ali, Sudhanshu Vrati, Malik Zainul Abdeen (Chapter authors) (10 March 2017). "Plant-based Edible Vaccines: Issues and Advantages". Plant Biotechnology: Principles and Applications. Springer. pp. 329–. ISBN 978-981-10-2961-5.

=== Articles ===
- Ta, M.; Vrati, S. (June 2000). "Mov34 protein from mouse brain interacts with the 3' noncoding region of Japanese encephalitis virus". Journal of Virology. 74 (11): 5108–5115. doi:10.1128/jvi.74.11.5108-5115.2000. ISSN 0022-538X. PMC 110863. PMID 10799585.
- Kalia, Manjula; Khasa, Renu; Sharma, Manish; Nain, Minu; Vrati, Sudhanshu (1 January 2013). "Japanese Encephalitis Virus Infects Neuronal Cells through a Clathrin-Independent Endocytic Mechanism". Journal of Virology. 87 (1): 148–162. doi:10.1128/jvi.01399-12. ISSN 0022-538X. PMC 3536362. PMID 23055570.
- Bhullar, Deepika; Jalodia, Richa; Kalia, Manjula; Vrati, Sudhanshu (29 December 2014). "Cytoplasmic Translocation of Polypyrimidine Tract-Binding Protein and Its Binding to Viral RNA during Japanese Encephalitis Virus Infection Inhibits Virus Replication". PLOS ONE. 9 (12) e114931. Bibcode:2014PLoSO...9k4931B. doi:10.1371/journal.pone.0114931. ISSN 1932-6203. PMC 4278868. PMID 25545659.

== See also ==
- List of vaccine topics
- Immunotherapy
