= Agriculture University, Jodhpur =

Public agricultural university in Rajasthan, India

- Motto: Working for the welfare of farmers
- Type: Public
- Established: 2013; 13 years ago
- Affiliations: ICAR
- Chancellor: Governor of Rajasthan
- Vice-Chancellor: Dr. Virendra Singh Jetawat
- Location: Jodhpur, Rajasthan, India; 26.351°N 73.044°E
- Website: aujodhpur.ac.in

Agriculture University, Jodhpur (AUJ) is an agricultural university in Jodhpur, Rajasthan, India. It was established in 2013 by the Government of Rajasthan under the Agriculture University, Jodhpur Act, 2013. Its jurisdiction covers six districts, namely Jodhpur, Barmer, Nagaur, Pali, Jalore and Sirohi.

== Constituents ==
AUJ has seven constituent colleges:

- College of Agriculture, Jodhpur
- College of Agriculture, Sumerpur
- College of Agriculture, Nagaur
- College of Agriculture, Baytu, Barmer
- College of Dairy and Food Technology, Jodhpur
- College of Technology and Agriculture Engineering, Jodhpur
- Faculty of Management, Jodhpur

Besides teaching, the university manages two agricultural research stations (Mandor, Jodhpur and Keshwana, Jalore), three agricultural research substations (Sumerpur, Nagaur and Samdari) and eight Krishi Vigyan Kendras (Phalodi, Sirohi, Keshwana, Moulasar, Nagaur, Gudamalani, Raipur Pali-II, Bamanwara Jalore-II).
