= Anand Agricultural University =

Public state agricultural university in Gujarat, India

- Type: Public
- Established: 2004
- Affiliations: ICAR
- Chancellor: Governor of Gujarat
- Vice-Chancellor: Dr. M.P. Patel
- Location: Anand, Gujarat, India
- Campus: Urban
- Website: www.aau.in

Anand Agricultural University (AAU) is a public state agricultural university is located in the western Indian state of Gujarat between the cities of Vadodara and Ahmedabad. This was formerly the Anand Campus of Gujarat Agricultural University, which is now independent. It has three constituent colleges, for agriculture, veterinary science and animal husbandry and dairy science. The jurisdiction of the university covers Kheda, Anand, Ahmedabad, Vadodara, Dahod and Panchmahal districts. It was set up to provide education support to the farming community in areas such as Agriculture, Horticulture, Engineering, Information technology and Business Studies.

== History ==
Anand Agricultural University was previously a part of Gujarat Agricultural University, a benchmark project initiated by Sardar Vallabhbhai Patel and K.M munsi by incorporating Krushi-Go-Vidhya Bhavan or the Institute of Agriculture, in 1938. The institute was popularly known as Khetiwadi; it became part of Gujarat Agricultural University in 1972.

The B. A. College of Agriculture, established in 1947, was initially affiliated to Bombay University until 1956, followed by Gujarat University until 1962 and Sardar Patel University along with the Sheth M.C College of Dairy Science. In 1972 they became integral institutions of Gujarat Agricultural University along with the Government College of Veterinary Science and Animal Husbandry, Anand, which was established in 1964. The activities of the Anand zone of the erstwhile Gujarat Agricultural University have been transferred to the Anand Agricultural University with effect from 2004.

== Rankings ==
The university is ranked 23rd in India in Agriculture and Allied Sectors, as per the National Institutional Ranking Framework (NIRF) rankings of 2024.

== Centers for education ==
- Bansilal Amritlal College of Agriculture, Anand
- Sheth M. C. College of Dairy Science, Anand
- College of Veterinary Science and Animal Husbandry, Anand
- College of Agricultural Engineering and Technology, Godhra
- College of Agricultural Information Technology, Anand
- College of Food Processing Technology and Bio Energy, Anand
- College of Horticulture, Anand (Established as wing under B.A. College of Agriculture)
- College and Polytechnic of Agriculture, Vaso (Established as wing under B.A. College of Agriculture)
- College of Agriculture, Jabuagm (Established as wing under B.A. College of Agriculture)
- Sheth M. C. Polytechnic in Agriculture, Anand
- Polytechnic in Horticulture, Vadodara
- Polytechnic in Agricultural Engineering, Dahod
- Polytechnic in Food Science and Home Economics, Anand

== Research centers ==
- AAU Incubator, Agri & Food Business Incubator, AAU, Anand
- Regional Research Station, Anand
- Bidi Tobacco Research Station, Anand
- Main Forage Research Station, Anand
- Reproductive Biology Research Unit, Anand
- Main Vegetable Research Station, Anand
- Medicinal and Aromatic Plant Research Center, Boriavi
- Bio control Project, Anand
- Weed Control Project, Anand
- Micronutrient Project, Anand
- Animal Nutrition Research, Anand
- Center of Excellence in Agricultural Biotechnology, Anand
- AINP on Pesticide Residues, ICAR, Unit-9
- Rice Research Station
- Main Maize Research Station, Godhra
- Regional Research Station, Arnej
- Agricultural Research Station, Dahod
- Regional Cotton Research Station, Viramgam
- Agricultural Research Station, Derol
- Agricultural Research Station, Dhandhuka
- Agricultural Research Station for Irrigated Crops, Thasra
- Pulse Research Station, Vadodara
- Paddy Research Station, Dabhoi
- Castor and Seed Spices Research Station, Sanand
- Narmada Irrigation Research station, Khandha

== Extension education centers ==
- School of Baking, Anand
- Sardar Smruti Kendra, Anand
- Agriculture Information Technology Center, Anand
- Centre for Communication Net work, Anand
- Farm Advisory Service, Anand
- Extension Education Institute, Anand
- Poultry Training Centre, Anand
- Mali Training Centre, Anand
- Transfer of Technology Centre, Anand, Arnej
- Krishi Vigyan Kendra, Devataj (Sojitra)
- Krishi Vigyan Kendra, Arnej
- Krishi Vigyan Kendra, Dahod
- Tribal Training Centre, Devagadhbaria
- Tribal Training, Dahod

== See also ==
- Agricultural Universities in India
