= P. V. Narasimha Rao Telangana Veterinary University =

Veterinary university in Telangana, India

- Former names: Hyderabad Veterinary College; Sri P. V. Narasimha Rao Telangana State University for Veterinary, Animal and Fishery Sciences
- Type: Public
- Established: 2014; 12 years ago
- Affiliations: ICAR
- Chancellor: Governor of Telangana
- Vice-Chancellor: Adhar Sinha, IAS
- Location: Hyderabad, Telangana, India; 17.326235°N 78.4083168°E
- Website: shikshanatsvu.org

P. V. Narasimha Rao Telangana Veterinary University or (PVNRTVU), formerly Hyderabad Veterinary College and Sri P. V. Narasimha Rao Telangana State University for Veterinary, Animal and Fishery Sciences (SPVNRTSUVAFS), is a veterinary university situated in Rajendranagar, Hyderabad, Telangana, India. It was formed in 2014 after the division of Andhra Pradesh.

== History ==
The university was first established as Hyderabad Veterinary College in 1946 as a constituent college of Osmania University. It came under the administration of the Andhra Pradesh Agricultural University in 1964 when it was established, and remained so until 2005, when Sri Venkateswara Veterinary University was formed, bifurcating veterinary institutes. In 2014, following the reorganisation of Andhra Pradesh and the formation of Telangana, the Sri P. V. Narasimha Rao Telangana State University for Veterinary, Animal and Fishery Sciences was formed as via an Act of the Government of Telangana. The university was renamed from 24-05-2016 as P. V. Narasimha Rao Telangana Veterinary University.

== See also ==
- Education in India
- List of institutions of higher education in Telangana
