= G. B. Pant University of Agriculture and Technology =

Agricultural university in Pantnagar, Uttarakhand, India

Coordinates: 29°01′N 79°29′E

- Motto in English: "The prosperity & development of our village is the prosperity of our nation"
- Type: Public, land-grant
- Established: 1960; 66 years ago
- Affiliations: ICAR, AICTE
- Chancellor: Governor of Uttarakhand
- Vice-Chancellor: Dr. Shivendra Kumar Kashyap
- Academic staff: 763
- Administrative staff: 631
- Total staff: 2,878
- Students: 4,200 - 4,400
- Location: Pantnagar, Udham Singh Nagar, Uttarakhand, 263145, India
- Campus: 12,661 acres (5,124 ha)
- Website: gbpuat.ac.in

G. B. Pant University of Agriculture and Technology, also known as Pantnagar University, is the first agricultural university established in Independent India. It was inaugurated by the first Prime Minister of India Jawahar Lal Nehru on 17 November 1960 as the Uttar Pradesh Agricultural University (UPAU) in Pantnagar. Later the name was changed to Govind Ballabh Pant University of Agriculture and Technology in 1972 in memory of the first Chief Minister of Uttar Pradesh, statesman and Bharat Ratna recipient Govind Ballabh Pant. The university is located in the campus town of Pantnagar in Kichha Tehseel and in the district of Udham Singh Nagar near the famous town of Nainital in the State of Uttarakhand. The university is regarded as the harbinger of the Green Revolution in India.

India's agriculture industry is a global powerhouse today, employing around 60 percent of the nation's workforce and contributing to about 20 percent of its GDP. Related to agriculture, India's energy sector is a rapidly growing industry balancing hydrocarbon fuels like coal, oil, and gas with significant recent capacity additions in sustainable energy sources like solar, wind, hydro, and nuclear, making the country the world's third-largest electricity producer after China and the United States.

Pantnagar University is a prominent centre of excellence in technological innovation and agricultural research in Asia. The prestigious university has produced many successful alumni in diverse fields, particularly agriculture, engineering, technology, politics, and civil services. The alumni network of the university includes Members of the Parliament, Members of the Legislative Assemblies, Indian Administrative Service (IAS) officers, Chief Executive Officers of successful technology and business ventures, and Director Generals of the Indian Council of Agricultural Research.

G. B. Pant University of Agriculture and Technology has been consistently ranked 1 as the best state agricultural university amongst approximately 70 state agricultural universities of the country at the Foundation Day celebrations of the Indian Council of Agricultural Research (ICAR). The university is also ranked overall 3 including ICAR institutions and state agricultural universities in the country.

The university is notable for having the most number of instructional days per year amongst all universities in India, and also for having one of the best teacher-student ratios (1:6) amongst all premier educational institutions in the country. With a massive campus covering over 12,000 acres near the Himalayas, Pantnagar University is also the largest university in India by area and acreage.

== History ==
=== Pre-establishment groundwork (1949–1959) ===
The first Education Commission of India (1949) headed by Sarvepalli Radhakrishnan recommended setting up rural universities in India on American land-grant model. Uttar Pradesh (UP), under chief-ministership of Govind Ballabh Pant, took the first step and in 1954 invited an Indo- American team headed by K. R. Damle, the Vice-President of ICAR, to consider an area around Tarai State farm in erstwhile Nainital district as a possible site for a rural university. This area was actually a dense forest near Himalayan foothills and the government was using this area to rehabilitate Hindu, Sikh and other migrants from West Pakistan, in the aftermath of the partition of 1947.

Encouraged by favourable view of the Damle team, two senior government officials- H S Sandhu and A N Jha visited United States to look for collaborations with US Universities. In consultation with University of Illinois dean Dr H W Hannah, the government of state of Uttar Pradesh presented a proposal to the Government of India in 1956 for establishing a Land-grant style university. Thereafter, a contract between the Government of India, the Technical Cooperation Mission and few US land grant universities, was signed to promote agricultural education in India. The US universities included the University of Tennessee, the Ohio State University, the Kansas State University, the University of Illinois, the Pennsylvania State University and the University of Missouri. The task of mentoring the proposed university in UP was assigned to the University of Illinois which signed a contract in 1959.

=== Initial years and development (1960–1972) ===
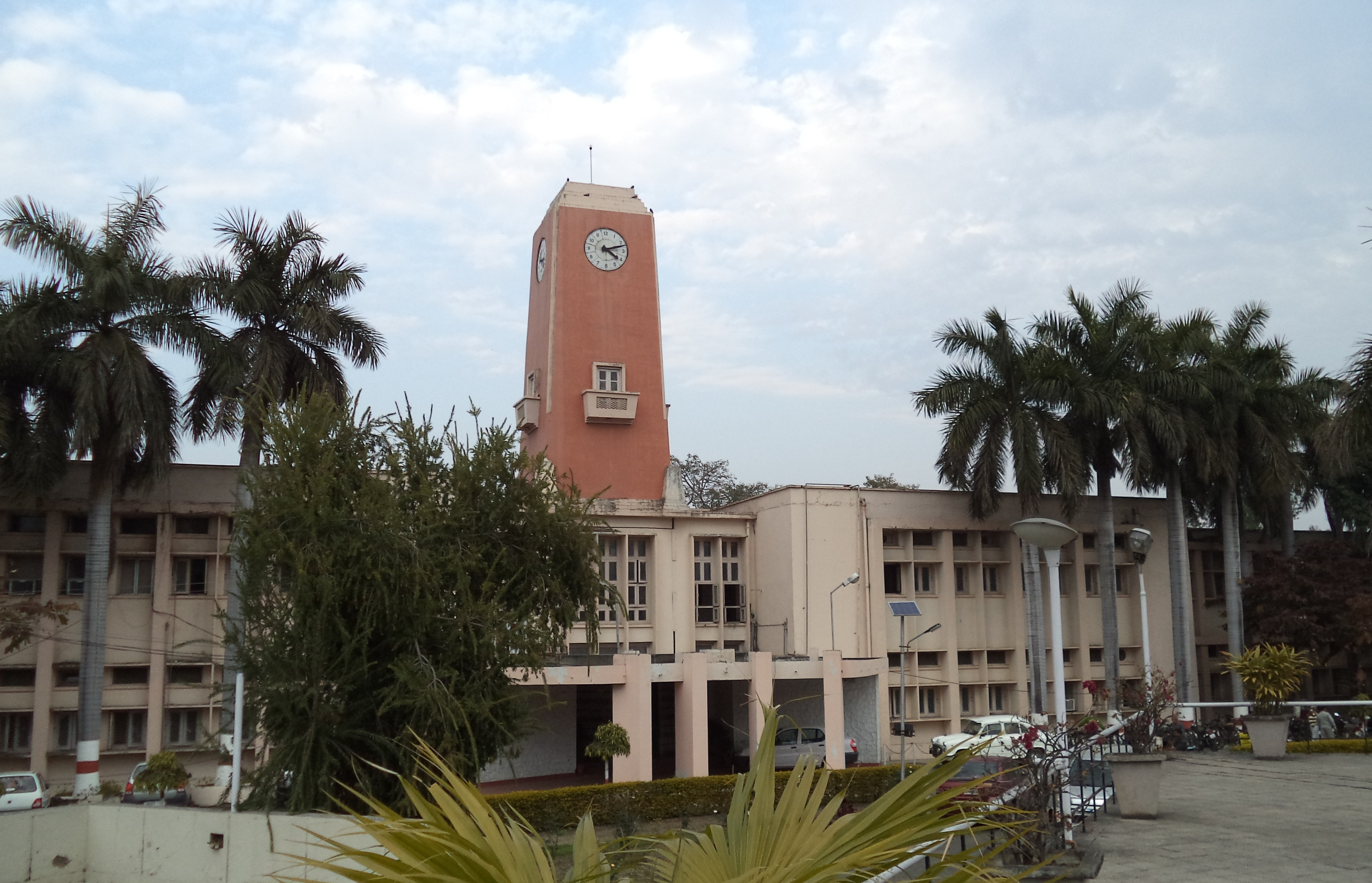
Main administrative building also called "Ghanta Ghar", which serves as VC office, is among the oldest buildings on campus.

The university was dedicated to the nation by the first prime minister of India, Jawaharlal Nehru, on 17 November 1960. In the early days, Illinois faculty served the university in designing its education system and putting in place an effective research and extension system. Six to eight Illinois faculty used to stay in Pantnagar at a time serving between 2- and 4-year terms for a period of 12 years. William Thompson, a team member on site at Pantnagar, shared that it was unusual for the project to start a university in a place with nothing

All buildings and facilities had to be constructed in the jungle there. In 1965, drastic upheaval of the university board of directors, which was spurred by lack of state government support for the institution, caused removal of the entire administrative and governance team of the university. D P Singh was named vice chancellor of the university with complete control over its affairs until a new board of directors was chosen. Under Singh's leadership, many necessary upgrades took place, and the university flourished. The University of Illinois left Pantnagar in 1972, when president Richard Nixon ordered Americans out of the near east.

The UP Act XI-V of 1958– the founding legislative act was later amended under UP Universities Re-enactment and Amendment Act 1972 and the university was rechristened as Govind Ballabh Pant University of Agriculture and Technology keeping in view the contributions of Govind Ballabh Pant. Pantnagar is a symbol of successful partnership between India and the United States. US greatly influenced the development of the university through its funding of several university programs. Many of the university's research activities were funded by the Rockefeller Foundation, the Ford Foundation, the Indo-U.S. Technical Cooperation Programme, and the United States Agency for International Development (program Public Law 480). The establishment of this university brought about a revolution in agricultural education, research and extension. It paved the way for setting up of 41 other state agricultural universities in the country.

=== Role in ushering Green Revolution ===
Pantnagar University soon became a significant force in the development and transfer of High Yielding Variety seeds and related technology. The Mexican wheat varieties, developed by Norman Borlaug were tested in Pantnagar and locally adaptable selections, like Pantnagar Kalyan Sona and other improved varieties were released for farmers. The university utilised its 16,000 acres (65 km^{2}) of land to launch one of the largest seed production programs at that time, under the brand name Pantnagar Seeds, which became a household name in rural India. The contribution of the university was recognised by Norman Borlaug, who described Pantnagar as "Harbinger of Green Revolution".

== Campus ==
The university campus at Pantnagar is spread in an area of 12,661 acres (51.24 km^{2}) which makes it the second largest university in the world, in terms of contiguous area. Before 2002, the university owned 16,000 acres (65 km^{2}), out of which 3,339 acres (13.51 km^{2}) was transferred to State Industrial Development Corporation of Uttarakhand (SIDCUL) for developing an Integrated Industrial estate, thus leaving 12,661-acre (51.24 km^{2}) with the university. Remaining land was transferred to other industries, railways, airport etc.

The university campus is located at a distance of 250 km from Delhi in Udham Singh Nagar district of Uttarakhand. The nearby towns are Rudrapur (16 km), Haldwani (25 km), Kichha (13 km) and Nainital (65 km). Two National Highways- NH 87 and Bareilly- Nainital highway touch the campus. Pantnagar Airport, operated by Airports Authority of India is located in the campus, 2.5 km west of main administrative building. Two railway stations of North Eastern Railways- Pantnagar (IR Code PBW) and Haldi Road (IR Code HLDD) are located in the campus at a distance of 4 km (east) and 3 km (west) respectively from administrative building. University shuttle service, local rickshaws, auto-rickshaws and matador vans connect various parts of the campus. Pantnagar is a purely residential university and comprises an independent township in itself. Population of Pantnagar, prior to establishment of Industrial estate was 35,820 (Census, 2001). Pantnagar is a part of Pantnagar- Kichha assembly constituency. The 'Concentric semicircles' or the 'rising sun' plan of the campus-centre was a brainchild of Department of Architecture of Illinois University.

== Administration and organization ==
In the Indian higher education system, Pantnagar is classified as a State Agricultural University. The university is in the jurisdiction of the state government. The governor of the state is the ex-officio chancellor of the university and appoints a vice-chancellor, who functions as a full-time chief executive of the university. The vice-chancellor chairs a 13-member board of management, which is the highest executive body of the university and oversees primarily financial and administrative matters and also ratifies recommendations of other councils of the university.

Budget allocations for the university in Rs crores (figure in parentheses are actual expenditures)
	State	ICAR	Other sources	Total
2005–2006	91.365 (84.570)	26.970 (22.735)	24.286 (24.653)	142.621 (131.958)
2006–2007	105.068 (94.016)	28.331 (29.502)	11.467 (13.833)	144.866 (137.351)
2007–2008	120.596 (115.990)	46.012 (47.302)	18.028 (11.166)	184.636 (174.458)
2008–2009	144.416 (138.925)	37.066 (36.274)	19.712 (15.458)	201.194 (190.657)
2009–2010	118.035 (133.310)	24.469 (25.988)	14.808 (13.231)	157.312 (172.319)
2010–2011	166.127 (168.726)	28.365 (25.617)	9.637 (8.998)	204.129 (203.341)
2011–2012	197.974 (185.581)	33.754 (28.198)	9.237 (6.406)	240.965 (220.185)

The other councils are the Academic council, the Research council and the Extension education council. Governor of Uttarakhand Lieutenant general Gurmit Singh is the present Chancellor and Manmohan Singh Chauhan is VC of the university.

The university is financed primarily from grant-in-aid of the state government and through grants received from the central government through Indian Council of Agricultural Research, besides income from student tuition fees, sponsored research, university farm, etc. Total allocated budget for the university in the year 2011–2012 stood at Rs 240 crores (~ US$50 million), which puts Pantnagar among top five agricultural universities in terms of financial resources.

Recently, a high powered central government committee – the Committee to Advise on Renovation and Rejuvenation of Higher Education (Yashpal Committee, 2009) — has recommended converting agricultural universities into general universities encompassing all branches of studies.

=== Vice-Chancellor ===
Sl	Name	Term Start	Term End
1	Raja Bajrang Bhadur Singh	20-12-1964	18-1-1966
2	Dr. Dhyan Pal Singh	28-1-1966	19-1-1975
3	Shri Shiv Prasad Pandey	20-1-1975	20-4-1977
4	Dr. Dharma Pal Singh	22-10-1977	22-6-1978
5	Mr. Narendra Shankar Mathur	1-8-1978	12-5-1980
6	Mr. Anand Sarup	27-8-1980	7-2-1983
7	Mr. Kripa Narayan	9-2-1983	21-1-1987
8	Dr. Kailash Nath Katiyar	27-1-1987	26-7-1987
9	Dr. Mahatim Singh	31-7-1987	30-7-1990
10	Dr. Hari Govind Singh	31-7-1990	17-12-1993
11	Dr. Suresh Chandra Mudgal	17-12-1993	18-2-1997
12	Dr. Surendra Bahadur Singh	18-2-1997	17-2-2000
13	Dr. J. B. Chowdhary	17-2-2000	15-4-2002
14	Dr. Prem Lal Gautam	18-6-2002	11-10-2007
15	Dr. A.P. Sharma	12-10-2007	08-08-2008
16	Dr. B.S. Bisht	09-08-2008	08-08-2012
17	Shri Subhash Kumar	09-08-2012	08-05-2013
18	Shri Alok Kumar Jain	09-05-2013	26-04-2014
19	Dr. Matthew Prasad	27-04-2014	14-10-2014
20	Dr. H.S. Dhami	15-10-2014	20-03-2015
21	Dr. Mangala Rai	21-03-2015	26-09-2016
22	Dr. J. Kumar	27-09-2016	25-09-2017
23	Dr. A. K. Misra	26-09-2017	25-09-2018
24	Shri Rajiv Rautela	26-09-2018	15-10-2018
25	Dr. Tej Partap	16-10-2018	17-04-2022
26	Dr. A.K. Shukla	18-04-2022	14-08-2022
27	Dr. Manmohan Singh Chauhan	15-08-2022	26-04-2026
28	Dr. S.K. Kashyap	27-04-2026	-present

== Academics ==
=== Colleges ===
Pantnagar is a non-affiliating university and its academic activities are organized through its nine constituent colleges (faculties), which run large undergraduate (UG) programs. All master's and PhD students are part of College of Post Graduate Studies, however they have strong association with one of the other colleges as per their academic major. Prior to 2012, the university also had two off-campus colleges namely, 'College of Forestry and Hill Agriculture, Ranichauri' (founded 1991) and 'Veer Chandra Singh Garhwali College of Horticulture, Bharsar' (founded 2002). However, recently, through an act of Uttarakhand Legislative Assembly these colleges have been transferred to newly incorporated Uttarakhand University of Horticulture and Forestry. Distributed among colleges and other units of the university, there are 763 teachers and officers, 59 technical personnel, 631 administrative personnel and 1425 class III employees, amounting to a total staff strength of 2878 against a students strength of 2800–3000, which makes teacher taught ratio of about 1:6 and student-staff ratio about 1:1.

==== List of colleges ====
No.	College	Year founded	Annual student intake	Faculty strength
1	College of Agriculture	1960	425	170
2	College of Veterinary and Animal Sciences	1960	100	81
3	College of Technology	1962	532	98
4	College of Basic Sciences and Humanities	1963	185	72
5	College of Post Graduate Studies	1963	*	**
6	College of Home Science	1971	125	25
7	College of Fisheries	1985	41	13
8	College of Agribusiness Management	1996	90	9
9	International School for Agriculture	2010	17	**

∗ Counted in associated College
** Participating faculty from various departments

=== Education system ===
The university shifted from a trimester to a semester system in the 1980s to reduce the workload on students. There are 200–210 net instructional days per year, which is highest in India.There is continuous evaluation system in semester through well known Hourlies i.e One hour exam (two in each semester) besides final examination at the end of semester. The minimum duration of all UG programs of the university is 8 semesters (4 years), except BVSc&AH (11 semesters, 5.5 years). All the UG programs are infused with extensive practical training and include one semester of compulsory internship/ work experience. All master's programs are of 4 semester (2 years), except MCA (6 semester/ 3 years). Normal duration for PhD is 6 semesters. The university follows a credit based GPA system for evaluation. In 1998, it shifted from the US style 5-point and letter grade system to a 10-point GPA based system, for easy conversion to percentages, which are more commonly used in India.

Cumulative Grade Point Average (CGPA)

$$CGPA \,\! = {\sum_{i=1}^N C_i . {GP}_i \over \sum_{i=1}^N C_i}$$

where:

- $N$ is the number of courses,
- $C_i$ is credits of the $i^{th}$ course,
- ${GP}_i$ is grade points for the $i^{th}$ course.

The university follows 100% internal evaluation on continuous basis. A course has typically 2 pre-final exams (popularly called as "hourlies"), 1 lab final exam and 1 semester-end final exam, totalling 4 evaluation cycles per semester. Typically, a UG student registers for 8 courses in a semester, leading to 8*4= 32 exams i.e. on an average basis, 1 exam on every fourth working day.

== Research ==
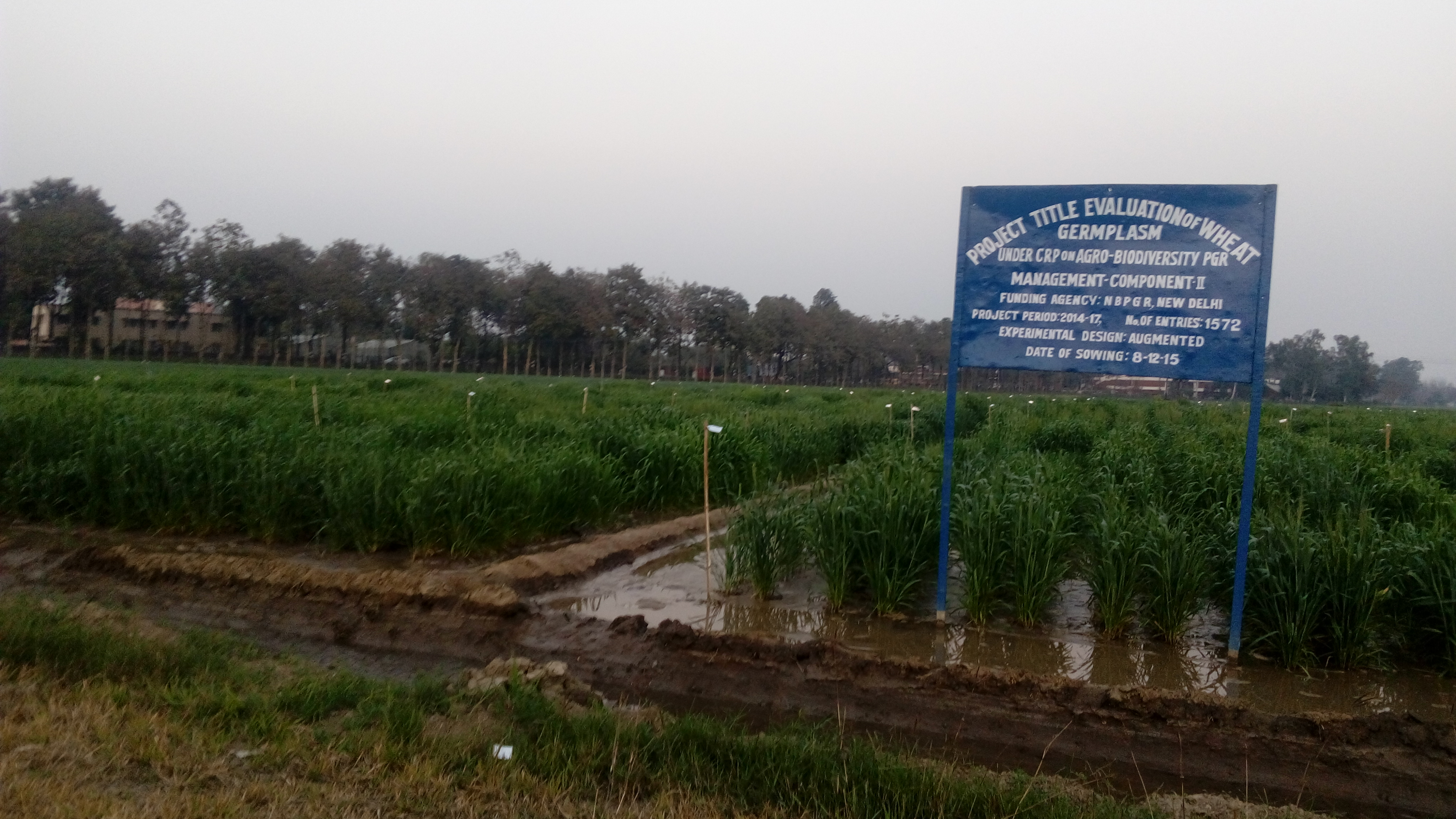
A field experiment in Norman Borlaug Crops Research Center, Pantnagar

Being an Agriculture and Technology university, the main focus of research is on agriculture and engineering. Research is coordinated by a Directorate of Experiment Station and carried out through ~70 subject-matter departments spread across colleges, 14 specialised research centres located in the campus, 7 dedicated off-campus research stations and 10 off-campus horticultural research-cum-extension centres. So far, the university has released 211 varieties, many of which played important role in Green Revolution. The work of the university in introducing soybean as a crop in India is well known. As Uttarakhand has been declared an 'Organic state', the present thrust of research is on Organic farming and Biological pest control. The university has developed a pregnancy diagnostic kit for cattle and its Salmonellosis vaccine for poultry is in advanced trials. In 1991, engineers of the university developed a 'Zero-till Ferti seed drill' for No-till farming along with National Agro Industries Ludhiana Punjab, which has been immensely popular in Haryana, Punjab and other areas of Indo-gangetic plains. CIMMYT/CGIAR has described zero tillage technology based on the Pantnagar seed drill as the most widely adopted resource conserving technology in the Indo-Gangetic Plains, till date.

== Extension ==
Extension is one of the three mandates of the university. University organises informal continuing education programs for rural people for achieving better diffusion of innovation. The university reaches out to a wider clientele through short term training programs at its campuses, Farmer Field Schools, Participatory technology development programs, radio and television broadcast, community radio based narrowcasting, print media, Farmer's fairs, and other innovative communication technologies. The university maintains a State Agricultural Management and Extension Training Institute and a network of 11 Krishi Vigyan Kendras (Farm Science Centres, KVKs) located in various districts.

== Student life ==
=== Residential life ===
Pantnagar is a residential university. Hostel accommodation is compulsory, except for the wards of university employees who live in the campus. In the Pantnagar campus, there are 23 hostels (called bhawans), including seven for girls, two for married couples and one for working women. The older hostels are named after important personalities of India: Mohandas K. Gandhi, Subhas Chandra Bose, Jawaharlal Nehru, Lal Bahadur Shastri, Govind Ballabh Pant, Sardar Vallabhbhai Patel, Rabindranath Tagore, Sarojini Naidu, Kasturba Gandhi, Mokshagundam Visvesvarayya, Chittaranjan Das (I and II) and Vivekananda with the exception of a hostel named Silver Jublee, which commemorates 25 years of the university.

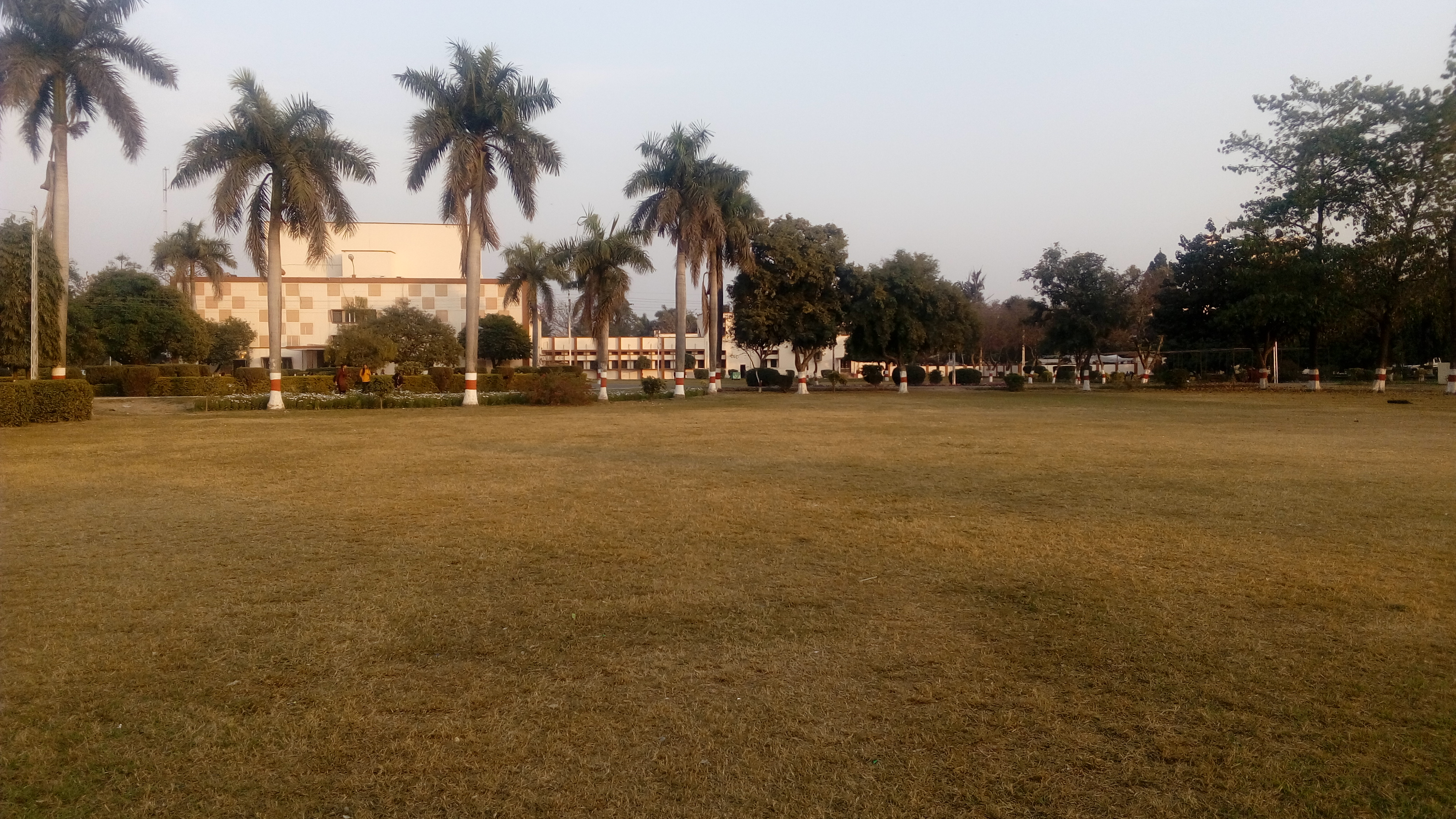
An evening at Gandhi Park, Pantangar

The names of newly constructed bhawans are inspired from the various geographical regions of the Uttarakhand — Gangotri, Yamunotri, Shivalik, Mandakini, Bhagirathi, Alaknanda etc. — with an exception of a new hostel named 'Golden Jublee', commemorating 50 years of the university. Most of older hostels are along the 'third arc' as per the original 'concentric semicircles' campus plan, while newer ones are on radial roads or other parts of the campus. There are two guest houses, Lambert's Square and International Guest House, which has a hostel wing for foreign students and an attached Farmer's Hostel. The hostels have student-managed or, in few cases, outsourced cafeteria-style food services. All the faculty members and employees stay in bungalows and apartments on campus. Two Market Namely Chhoti (small) and Bari (big) markets are also present in the campus.

=== Extracurricular activities ===
Most of the students' activities are organised through college-level professional societies, like the Agriculture Society, the Engineering Society, the Management Society, etc. These societies organise popular fests, fairs, cultural nights, treasure hunts and competitions year round. Apart from these, there are departmental societies, hostel societies and other organisations like the Vivekanand Swadhyay Mandal, Sanskritic Chetna Parishad, etc. which organise popular student activities. The Pantnagar Chapter of SPIC MACAY regularly organises classical music and dance concerts by renowned artistes. CHETNA Student Wing is an extension of CHETNA NGO (Delhi) working for upliftment of underprivileged and poor children in the campus and nearby areas. The university also has a team of students and working staff of the university called E-Cell, that tries to aware students about entrepreneurial skills by organising workshops and inviting a lot of experts. This team also works for providing internships and jobs to the students.

The university National Cadet Corps (NCC) chapter organises basic military training and adventure sports for student-cadets. The Remount & Veterinary (R&V) core is a Cavalry regiment of NCC, which trains students for professional equestrianism (horse riding). Pantnagar is among very few universities in India to have a full-fledged Air Squadron under NCC Air Wing, which promotes aviation and airmanship among students through its activities organised in the airport near the university campus.

All undergraduate students of Pantnagar take part in community service, which fetches them two credits towards their degrees in form of a mandatory National Service Scheme course involving 240 hours/10 days of social service. Students also take part in liberal education courses offered by the university like dance, music, yoga, Indian cultural heritage, personality development, English vocabulary, Indian languages (Tamil, Punjabi), foreign languages (French, German), etc. Stevenson stadium is the hub of sports activities, which are organised through 17 sport clubs.

== Notable alumni ==
- Vinay Mohan Kwatra, 34th Foreign Secretary of India from May 2022
- Islam A. Siddiqui, former Chief Agricultural Negotiator in the Office of the United States Trade Representative
- Rajinder Kumar Malhotra, Indian business professional & Chairman of the Modi Group. Completed his master's in plant pathology in 1971
- Vineet Nayar, former Chief executive officer of HCL Technologies
- Sudhanshu Trivedi, Prominent Indian Politician and National Spokesperson of the Bharatiya Janata Party
- Baba Sehgal, Indian pop singer
- Sankar Datta, renowned academician
- Anita Singh Rajput, Indian Politician and Ex MLA (Dibai) of the Bharatiya Janata Party
- Shantanu Gupta, Author and Political Analyst
- Akhil Chandra Banerjea, virologist, N-BIOS laureate
- Sudhanshu Vrati, vaccinologist, N-BIOS laureate
- Prabha Shankar Shukla, former VC of North Eastern Hill University

== See also ==
- Pantnagar
- Agricultural Universities (India)
- College of Agriculture, Pantnagar
- College of Technology, Pantnagar
