= Prabha Shankar Shukla =

Indian academic

- Born: 20 July 1968 (age 58); Uttar Pradesh, India
- Citizenship: Indian
- Education: G. B. Pant University of Agriculture and Technology
- Known for: Agriculture, Technology, Researchers
- Scientific career
- Fields: Agriculture
- Workplaces: G. B. Pant University of Agriculture and Technology

Prabha Shankar Shukla (born 20 July 1968) is an Indian Professor (Seed Science and technology) at G. B. Pant University of Agriculture and Technology. He has served as the Vice-Chancellor of North-Eastern Hill University (NEHU) from 27 July 2021 to 26 July 2026.

== Awards and honours ==
- Higher Education Award
