= Agriculture University, Kota =

Agricultural university in Rajasthan, India

- Type: Public
- Established: 2013; 13 years ago
- Affiliations: ICAR
- Chancellor: Governor of Rajasthan
- Vice-Chancellor: Dr. Vimla Dunkwal
- Location: Kota, Rajasthan, India; 25.182°N 75.889°E
- Website: aukota.org

Agriculture University, Kota (AUK) is an agricultural university situated in Kota, Rajasthan, India. It was established in 2013 by the Government of Rajasthan under Agriculture University, Kota Act, 2013, by bifurcating Maharana Pratap University of Agriculture and Technology and Swami Keshwanand Rajasthan Agricultural University. Its jurisdiction covers six districts, namely Kota, Baran, Bundi, Jhalawar, Karauli and Sawai Madhopur. Dinesh Chandra Joshi was appointed vice chancellor in 2019.

== Colleges ==
The university includes two colleges, College of Horticulture and Forestry, Jhalawar and College of Agriculture, Ummedganj, Kota.
