= Indian Grassland and Fodder Research Institute =

Indian research institute

Indian Grassland And Fodder Research Institute
- Abbreviation: IGFRI
- Formation: 1962
- Purpose: Grassland & Fodder Research Institute
- Location: Jhansi, Uttar Pradesh
- Director: Dr. Pankaj Kaushal
- Parent organization: (ICAR)
- Website: www.igfri.res.in
- Formerly called: Imperial Grassland And Fodder Research Institute

IGFRI is a national institute under the administrative control of Indian Council of Agricultural Research, and is mandated to conduct basic, strategic and adaptive research on improvement, production and utilization of fodder crops and grasslands, coordination of research on forages and grasslands for enhancing productivity and quality for enhancing livestock productivity, and technology dissemination and human resource development.

== History ==
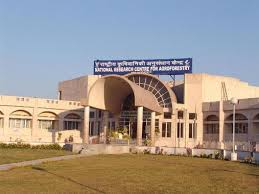
Grassland Jhansi

The Indian Grassland and Fodder Research Institute, established in 1962, has been involved in fostering research, training and extension programs on aspects of forage production and utilization through an inter-disciplinary approach. It has provided technologies, human resource development skills, consultancy and technical services on forage production and utilization to government and non-government organizations, agri-business and farmers. This has been possible due to the efforts of Dr. T. Mohapatra, Secretary DARE and Director General, ICAR, New Delhi. It has three regional stations to cater to forage related location specific R&D needs of humid tropics (at Dharwad), semi-arid and arid (at Avikanagar) and temperate (at Srinagar/ Palampur)
