= Rani Lakshmi Bai Central Agricultural University =

Central university in Jhansi, Uttar Pradesh, India

- Type: Central Agricultural University
- Established: 2014; 12 years ago
- Chancellor: Panjab Singh
- Vice-Chancellor: Dr. A. K. Singh
- Visitor: President of India
- Undergraduates: 120
- Location: Jhansi, Uttar Pradesh, India
- Campus: Suburban
- Website: www.rlbcau.ac.in

Rani Lakshmi Bai Central Agricultural University is central agriculture university located in Jhansi district of Uttar Pradesh. The university was established by the Government of India through the Rani Lakshmi Bai Central Agricultural University Act - 2014, passed by parliament in 2014 and operates under the administrative umbrella of the Ministry of Agriculture and Farmers' Welfare.It is recognised as Institute of National Importance by Government of India. The first academic session of university was started from July 2014. The university follows a semester system with two semesters every year.

== History ==
RLBCAU history starts with a memorandum submitted to the Prime Minister on 27 July 2009 by a delegation of MPs and MLAs, requesting the establishment of a central agricultural university in the Bundelkhand region.

The first bill for the establishment of the university was introduced in the Rajya Sabha on 28 December 2011. After clarifications, a reintroduction, a report by a committee and a response of the Department of Agricultural Research, "Rani Lakshmi Bai Central Agricultural University Act" was passed by both the houses and published on 5 March 2014.

== Campus ==
The campus of the university is nearby to Indian Grassland and Fodder Research Institute, Jhansi, and the building of the main campus is inaugurated by the Prime Minister of India, Narendra Modi.

== Academics ==
The university offers various courses at the UG, PG and Phd level. A Bachelor of Science (Hon.) has been awarded in agriculture since the 2014–2015 academic session.
