= Central Agricultural University =

Agricultural university in Manipur, India

Coordinates: 24.8130°N 93.8900°E

- Type: Central agricultural university
- Established: 26 January 1993; 33 years ago
- Affiliations: DARE, ICAR, UGC, ACU
- Chancellor: Pradeep Kumar Joshi
- Vice-Chancellor: Anupam Mishra
- Visitor: President of India
- Location: Lamphelpat, Imphal, Manipur, India
- Website: cau.ac.in

Central Agricultural University (CAU) is a central agricultural university located at Lamphelpat, Imphal, in the Indian state of Manipur. It is one of three central agricultural universities in India recognised by the Indian Council of Agricultural Research.

== History ==
The university was established by an act of Parliament, the Central Agricultural University Act, 1992 (No. 40 of 1992). The Act came into effect on 26 January 1993, following notification by the Department of Agricultural Research and Education (DARE), and the university became operational on 13 September 1993 with the appointment of its first vice-chancellor, M. P. Singh.

== Jurisdiction ==
The university's jurisdiction extends to seven of the eight North-Eastern states, namely Arunachal Pradesh, Manipur, Meghalaya, Mizoram, Nagaland, Sikkim and Tripura. Assam falls outside its jurisdiction, being served by Assam Agricultural University.

== Academics ==
CAU offers undergraduate programmes across agriculture, agricultural engineering, Community Science, horticulture, food nutrition and dietetics, food technology, forestry, fisheries, veterinary sciences, delivered through its constituent colleges. In undergraduate programme, the B.Sc.(hons.) degree in natural farming is introduced from the academic session 2023-24. The university offers M.Sc., M.V.Sc. and M. Tech Programmes in agriculture, agricultural Engineering, biochemistry, plant molecular biology and biotechnology, community science, food science, fishery science, forestry, horticulture, veterinary science and MBA offered through its constituent colleges. In different constituent colleges, Ph.D. degree programmes are offered in agriculture, agricultural engineering, horticulture, forestry, fishery science, Veterinary sciences. Admissions to undergraduate programmes are conducted partly through state nominations from the seven jurisdictional states under the university, which receive 85 per cent of seats at the undergraduate level under state reservation policies, and 15% through the ICAR AIEEA examination administered by the National Testing Agency. For M.Sc. and Ph.D degree programmes 25% of seats are reserved for the candidates who had passed examination conducted by ICAR and VCI at all India level; and remaining 75% seats through the university entrance examination which is open to all India level.

The university comprises thirteen constituent colleges spread across the North-Eastern region. In Manipur, these include the College of Agriculture at Imphal and the College of Food Technology at Lamphelpat. Arunachal Pradesh hosts the College of Horticulture and Forestry as well as the College of Agriculture, both at Pasighat. Meghalaya houses the College of Post Graduate Studies in Agricultural Sciences at Umiam, the College of Community Science at Tura, and the College of Agriculture at Kyrdemkulai. Mizoram is home to the College of Veterinary Sciences and Animal Husbandry at Selesih and the College of Horticulture at Thenzawl. Nagaland has the College of Veterinary Science and Animal Husbandry at Jalukie. Sikkim hosts the College of Agricultural Engineering and Post Harvest Technology at Gangtok and the College of Horticulture at Bermiok, while the College of Fisheries at Lembucherra is located in Tripura.

The university also operates six Krishi Vigyan Kendras, which serve as agricultural extension centres, at Andro in Imphal East district of Manipur, East Siang in Arunachal Pradesh, Aizawl in Mizoram, East Garo Hills and South Garo Hills in Meghalaya, and Sepahijala in Tripura. The university has six multi-technology testing centre (MTTC) and vocational training centre(VTC), which serve as the centre to validate and test technology developed by the university, which are located at College of Agriculture, Imphal; College of Agriculture, Pasighat, College of Horticulture, Bermiok, College of horticulture, Thenzawl, College of community science, Tura and College of Fisheries, Tripura

== Alumni ==
Alumni of the university is studying at renowned International Institutes, National Institutes; working at organizations of national repute, Central Universities, State Agricultural Universities etc.

== Notable Alumni ==
Some of the alumni studying at renowned international institutes are 1. Sindoora Nalajala at University of Georgia, US ; 2. Hawaibam Birla Singh at Synthetic Biotechnology Laboratory at Gyeongsang National University http://synbilab.com/index.php?gt=people/people04 3. Puyam Tondonba Singh at National Pingtung University of Science and Technology, Taiwan 4.Lokesh Pawar at University of Algarve, Atlantic Technological University, University of Gothenburg, University of Brest Some alumni are working as head/director of national institute of repute; viz., Anup Das; Director, ICAR Research Complex for Eastern Region, Patna, Bihar, February, 2023 onwards ;2. Priyojoy Kar Scientist Scientist (Agricultural Extension Education) at ICAR- National Research Centre on Pig, Guwahati, Assam

== Rankings ==
In the ranking by Indian Council of Agricultural Research (ICAR), New Delhi in the year 2021, the central agricultural university, Imphal, India was ranked 13th position out of sixty-seven (67) participating universities In the National Institutional Ranking Framework, the university was ranked 24th in the "Agriculture and Allied Sectors" category in 2025.
