= Dr. Y.S.R. Horticultural University =

Agricultural university in Tadepalligudem, India

- Former name: Andhra Pradesh Horticultural University
- Type: Public
- Established: 2007
- Affiliations: UGC
- Chancellor: Governor of Andhra Pradesh
- Vice-Chancellor: B. Jayarami Reddy
- Location: Tadepalligudem, Andhra Pradesh, India; 16.8831°N 81.4513°E
- Website: www.drysrhu.ap.gov.in

Dr. Y.S.R. Horticultural University, formerly Andhra Pradesh Horticultural University, is a state university located at Venkataramannagudem, near Tadepalligudem in West Godavari district, Andhra Pradesh, India. It was established in 2007 by the Government of Andhra Pradesh and focuses on education and research of horticultural science.

== History ==
Dr. Y.S.R. Horticultural University was established in 2007 by the Government of Andhra Pradesh as the Andhra Pradesh Horticultural University, together with three colleges of horticulture, at Venkataramannagudem in West Godavari district, Mojerla in Mahaboob Nagar district and Anantharajupet in Kadapa district, as well as some educational programmes which were offered under Acharya N. G. Ranga Agricultural University. It was originally managed by a government official until the appointment of the first Vice-Chancellor in 2008, when it became independent. It was renamed as Dr. Y.S.R. Horticultural University in 2011.
