= Pantnagar =

- town
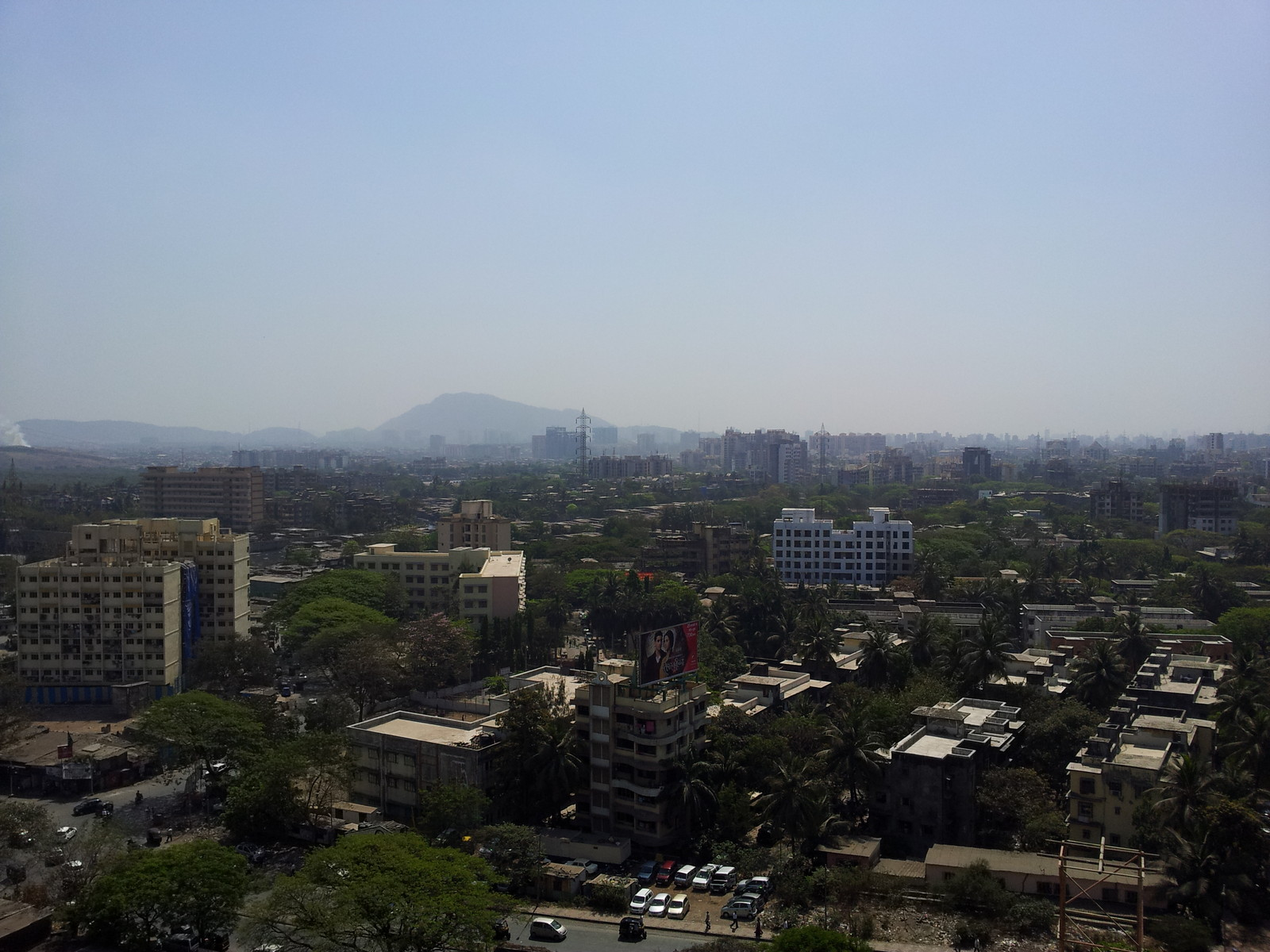
- Aerial view of Pantnagar

- Location in, India Pantnagar (India)
- Coordinates: 28.97°N 79.41°E
- Country: India
- State: Uttarakhand
- District: Udham Singh Nagar
- Elevation: 243.84 m (800.0 ft)

Population (2001)
  - Total: 35,820

Languages
  - Official: Hindi
  - Native: Tharu, Rana Tharu, Buksa
- Time zone: UTC+5:30 (IST)
- PIN: 263145
- Vehicle registration: UK 06
- Website: usnagar.nic.in

Pantnagar is a town and a university campus in Udham Singh Nagar District, Uttarakhand. Nainital, Kashipur, Rudrapur, Kiccha, Lalkuan, Shaktifarm and Haldwani are the major cities surrounding Pantnagar.

The town is home to the first agricultural university of India which was established on 17 November 1960. The university was earlier called the Uttar Pradesh Agricultural University or Pantnagar University. It was renamed G. B. Pant University of Agriculture and Technology. keeping in view the contributions of Pt. Govind Ballabh Pant, the then Chief Minister of UP.

In recent years, an integrated industrial estate has been established near the campus which houses companies such as Tata Motors, Bajaj, Britannia, Hewlett-Packard, Hindustan Computers Ltd., Voltas, Schneider Electric, Nestle, Dabur, Vedanta Resources, etc., as a part of SIDCUL Industrial Area developed by the government owned State Industrial Development Corporation of Uttarakhand.

== History ==
Before November 2000 Pantnagar was in the Indian state of Uttar Pradesh. After 9 November 2000 it became part of the new Indian state of Uttarakhand, which is located in the northern part of India. Uttarakhand was carved out of Himalayan and adjoining districts of Uttar Pradesh. After independence, development of the rural sector was considered the primary concern of the Government of India. In 1949, with the appointment of the Radhakrishnan University Education Commission, imparting of agricultural education through the setting up of rural universities became the focal point. Later, in 1954 an Indo-American team led by Dr. K.R. Damle, the Vice-President of ICAR, was constituted that arrived at the idea of establishing a ‘Rural University’ on the land-grant pattern of US. As a consequence a contract between the Government of India, the Technical Cooperation Mission and some land-grant universities of US, was signed to promote agricultural education in the country. The US universities included the universities of Tennessee, the Ohio State University, the Kansas State University, The University of Illinois, the Pennsylvania State University and the University of Missouri. The task of assisting Uttar Pradesh in establishing an agricultural university was assigned to the University of Illinois which signed a contract in 1959 to establish an agricultural University in the State. Dean, H.W. Hannah, of the University of Illinois prepared a blueprint for a Rural University to be set up at the Tarai State Farm in the district Nainital, UP. In the initial stage the University of Illinois also offered the services of its scientists and teachers. Thus, in 1960, the first agricultural university of India, UP Agricultural University, came into being by an Act of legislation, UP Act XI-V of 1958. The Act was later amended under UP Universities Re-enactment and Amendment Act 1972 and the university was rechristened as Govind Ballabh Pant University of Agriculture and Technology keeping in view the contributions of Pt. Govind Ballabh Pant, the then Chief Minister of UP. The university was dedicated to the Nation by the first Prime Minister of India Pt Jawaharlal Nehru on 17 November 1960.

The G.B. Pant University is a symbol of successful partnership between India and the United States. The establishment of this university brought about a revolution in agricultural education, research and extension. It paved the way for setting up of 31 other agricultural universities in the country

The credit for starting the functioning of the university goes the first Vice-Chancellor, late Dr. Kenneth Anthony Parker Stevenson (1-12-58 to 2-1-64). The other Vice-Chancellors to be remembered for their distinctive contributions in the development of the University are :

| Serial No. | Name | Time |
|---|---|---|
| 1 | Raja Bajrang Bhadur Singh | 20-12-1964 to 18- 01- 1966 |
| 2 | Dr. Dhyan Pal Singh | 28-1-66 to 19-1-75 |
| 3 | Shri Shiv Prasad Pandey | 20-1-75 to 20-4-77 |
| 4 | Dr. Dharma Pal Singh | 22-10-77 to 22-6-78 |
| 5 | Mr. Narendra Shankar Mathur | 1-8-78 to 12-5-80 |
| 6 | Mr. Anand Sarup | 27-8-80 to 7-2-83 |
| 7 | Mr. Kripa Narayan | 9-2-83 to 21-1-87 |
| 8 | Dr. Kailash Nath Katiyar | 27-1-87 to 26-7-87 |
| 9 | Dr. Mahatim Singh | 31-7-87 to 30-7-90 |
| 10 | Dr. Hari Govind Singh | 31-7-90 to 17-12-93 |
| 11 | Dr. Suresh Chandra Mudgal | 17-12-93 to 18-2-97 |
| 12 | Dr. Surendra Bahadur Singh | 18-2-97 to 17-2-2000 |
| 13 | Dr. J. B. Chowdhary | 17-2-2000 to 15-4-2002 |
| 14 | Dr. Amresh Kumar | |
| 15 | Dr. Prem Lal Gautam | 18-6-2002 to 11-10-2007 |
| 16 | Dr. A.P. Sharma | |
| 17 | Dr. B.S. Bisht | |
| 18 | Dr. Subhash Kumar | |
| 19 | Dr. Alok Jain | |
| 20 | Dr. Matthew Prasad | |
| 21 | Dr. H.S. Dhami | |
| 22 | Dr. Mangla Rai | 21-03-2015 to 26-09-2016 |
| 23 | Dr. J. Kumar | 27-09-2016 to 25-09-2017 |
| 24 | Prof Aditya Kumar Misra | From 26 to 09-2017 |

Today, the campus has well-tended fields, a network of roads, housing colonies, street lighting, a telephone exchange, hospitals, marketing centers, a water supply section, a community radio station 90.8 MHz, canteens, 6 primary schools and 3 secondary schools.

The main campus lies in Udham Singh Nagar district of Uttarakhand at 29° N latitude and 79° E longitude at an elevation of 243.8 m above the mean sea level. This main campus has the area responsibility for the entire Uttarakhand representing plains, Tarai, Bhabar and hill areas. However, to provide service to the hill region its other stations are situated at Ranichauri (Tehri district), Majhera (Nainital district) and at Lohaghat-Sui (Champawat district). There are 763 teachers and officers 59 technical staff, 631 administrative and ministerial personnel and 1425 class III employees, amounting to a total strength of 2878. The number of students in the university ranges between 2800 and 3000. Thus, the teacher taught ratio is about 1:6 and student-staff ratio is about 1:1.

== University ==
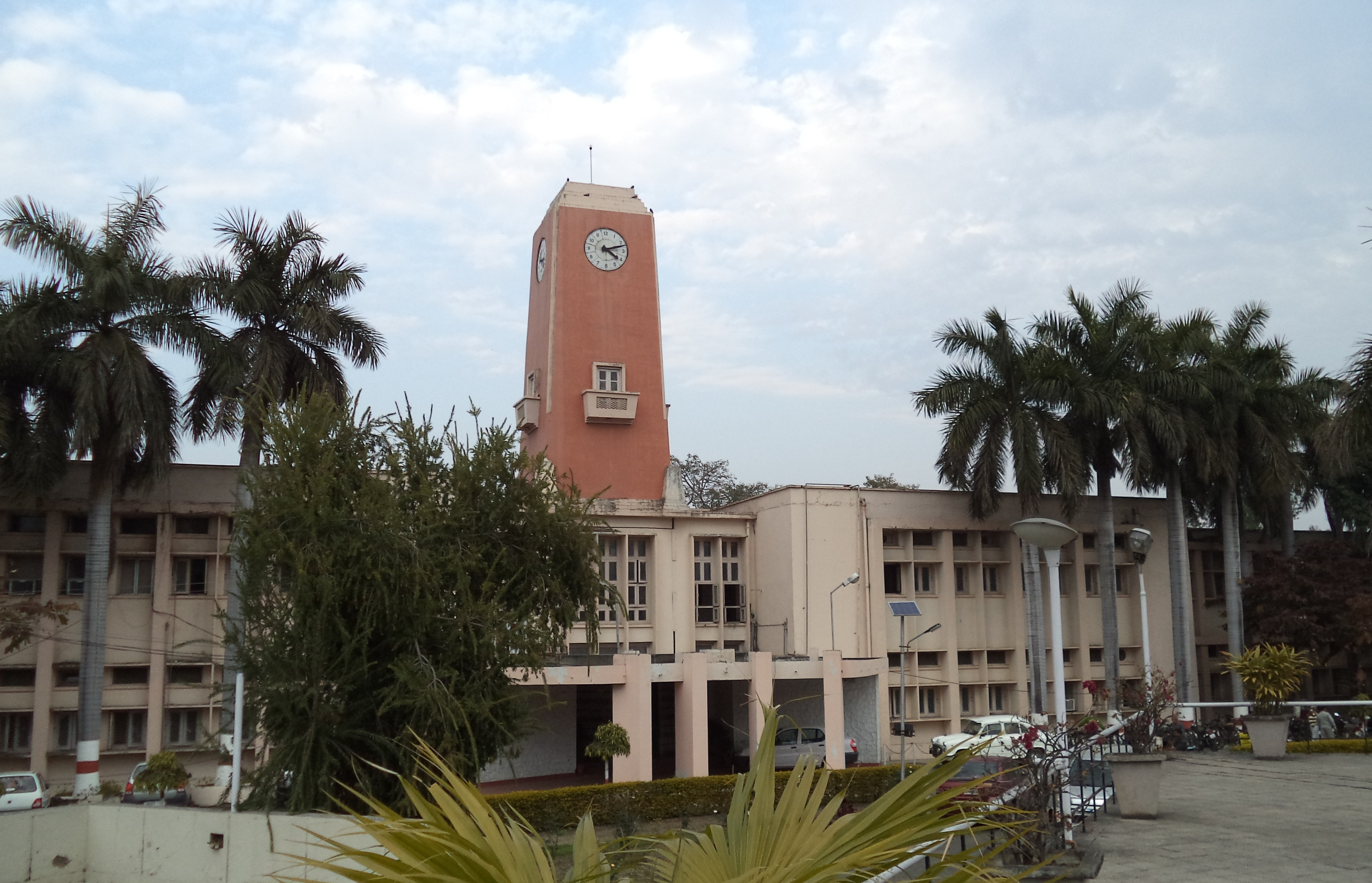
Main administrative building, in campus of G. B. Pant University of Agriculture and Technology

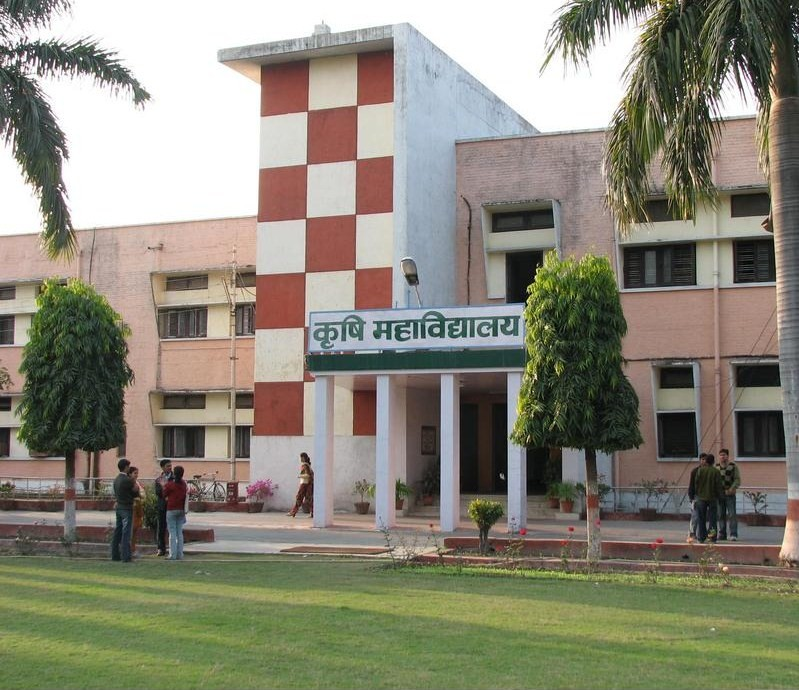
College of Agriculture at Pantnagar

Pantnagar University houses ten colleges:

- College of Agriculture
- College of Technology
- College of Home Science
- College of Basic Science & Humanities
- College of Veterinary & Animal Sciences
- College of Fisheries
- College of Agri-Business Management
- College of Post Graduate Studies
- College of Forestry & Hill Agriculture, Ranichauri, Tehri Garhwal (off-campus)
- VCSG College of Horticulture, Bharsar, Pauri Garhwal (off-campus)

== Schools ==
There are primary and secondary level schools located on the university campus. These include Campus school, Bal Nilyam Shishu Vidyalaya, Primary school, Pantnagar Inter College, Government Girls Inter College and Saraswati Shishu Mandir.

== Climate ==
Climate data for Pantnagar (1991–2020, extremes 1985–2020)
| Month | Jan | Feb | Mar | Apr | May | Jun | Jul | Aug | Sep | Oct | Nov | Dec | Year |
|---|---|---|---|---|---|---|---|---|---|---|---|---|---|
| Record high °C (°F) | 28.6 (83.5) | 34.0 (93.2) | 36.9 (98.4) | 41.5 (106.7) | 44.3 (111.7) | 45.6 (114.1) | 42.1 (107.8) | 39.6 (103.3) | 38.6 (101.5) | 38.0 (100.4) | 32.4 (90.3) | 29.4 (84.9) | 45.6 (114.1) |
| Mean daily maximum °C (°F) | 19.6 (67.3) | 24.0 (75.2) | 29.2 (84.6) | 34.9 (94.8) | 36.7 (98.1) | 35.8 (96.4) | 33.0 (91.4) | 32.6 (90.7) | 32.5 (90.5) | 31.0 (87.8) | 27.4 (81.3) | 22.6 (72.7) | 30.0 (86.0) |
| Mean daily minimum °C (°F) | 5.5 (41.9) | 7.7 (45.9) | 11.5 (52.7) | 16.0 (60.8) | 21.0 (69.8) | 24.3 (75.7) | 25.3 (77.5) | 25.0 (77.0) | 23.1 (73.6) | 16.9 (62.4) | 10.3 (50.5) | 6.2 (43.2) | 16.1 (61.0) |
| Record low °C (°F) | −2.2 (28.0) | −0.6 (30.9) | 3.4 (38.1) | 6.3 (43.3) | 8.0 (46.4) | 17.5 (63.5) | 13.0 (55.4) | 18.6 (65.5) | 16.2 (61.2) | 8.3 (46.9) | 1.2 (34.2) | 0.2 (32.4) | −2.2 (28.0) |
| Average rainfall mm (inches) | 28.0 (1.10) | 34.6 (1.36) | 22.4 (0.88) | 15.0 (0.59) | 46.4 (1.83) | 179.7 (7.07) | 397.7 (15.66) | 412.0 (16.22) | 263.5 (10.37) | 30.0 (1.18) | 3.1 (0.12) | 11.6 (0.46) | 1,443.9 (56.85) |
| Average rainy days | 1.6 | 2.2 | 1.6 | 1.3 | 3.3 | 7.6 | 14.0 | 14.6 | 8.5 | 1.3 | 0.3 | 0.6 | 56.9 |
| Average relative humidity (%) (at 17:30 IST) | 71 | 57 | 46 | 33 | 40 | 56 | 74 | 78 | 75 | 69 | 72 | 72 | 62 |
Source: India Meteorological Department

== Integrated industrial estate ==
The Integrated Industrial Estate, Pantnagar of the State Industrial Development Corporation of Uttarakhand (SIDCUL) houses the companies like Britannia Industries, HP, HCL, Voltas, Schneider Electric, Ashok Leyland, Delphi-TVS Diesel Systems Limited, Vedanta Resources, RSB Transmission, Bajaj Motors Ltd. and New Allenberry Works setting up their manufacturing units. and Tata Motors Rane Madras limited, Rane NSK Steering Systems Private Ltd.,

== Connectivity ==
- Pantnagar railway station is the nearest railway station to Pantnagar. Haldi Road railway station and Lalkuan railway station are located 5 kilometers and 9 kilometers respectively from Pantnagar.
- Pantnagar Airport - It is a domestic airport that serves the town of Pantnagar and is operated by the Airports Authority of India.

Between 2005 and 2008, the Government of Uttarakhand offered a subsidy to Jagson Airlines to start a daily scheduled flight between Pantnagar and New Delhi. The airline used an 18-seater Dornier 228 on the route. This was, however, withdrawn in 2008 when the runway size was increased. The government then invited Deccan Aviation to fly on the Delhi - Pantnagar route. Kingfisher Airlines, which took over Deccan Aviation, undertook seasonal flights to Pantnagar as the weather did not allow it to fly all round the year. Air India started flights from Delhi to Pantnagar using ATR 80 seater aircraft from the third week of October 2014.

== See also ==
- Pantnagar Airport
