= Pantnagar Airport =

Domestic airport in Rudrapur, Uttarakhand, India

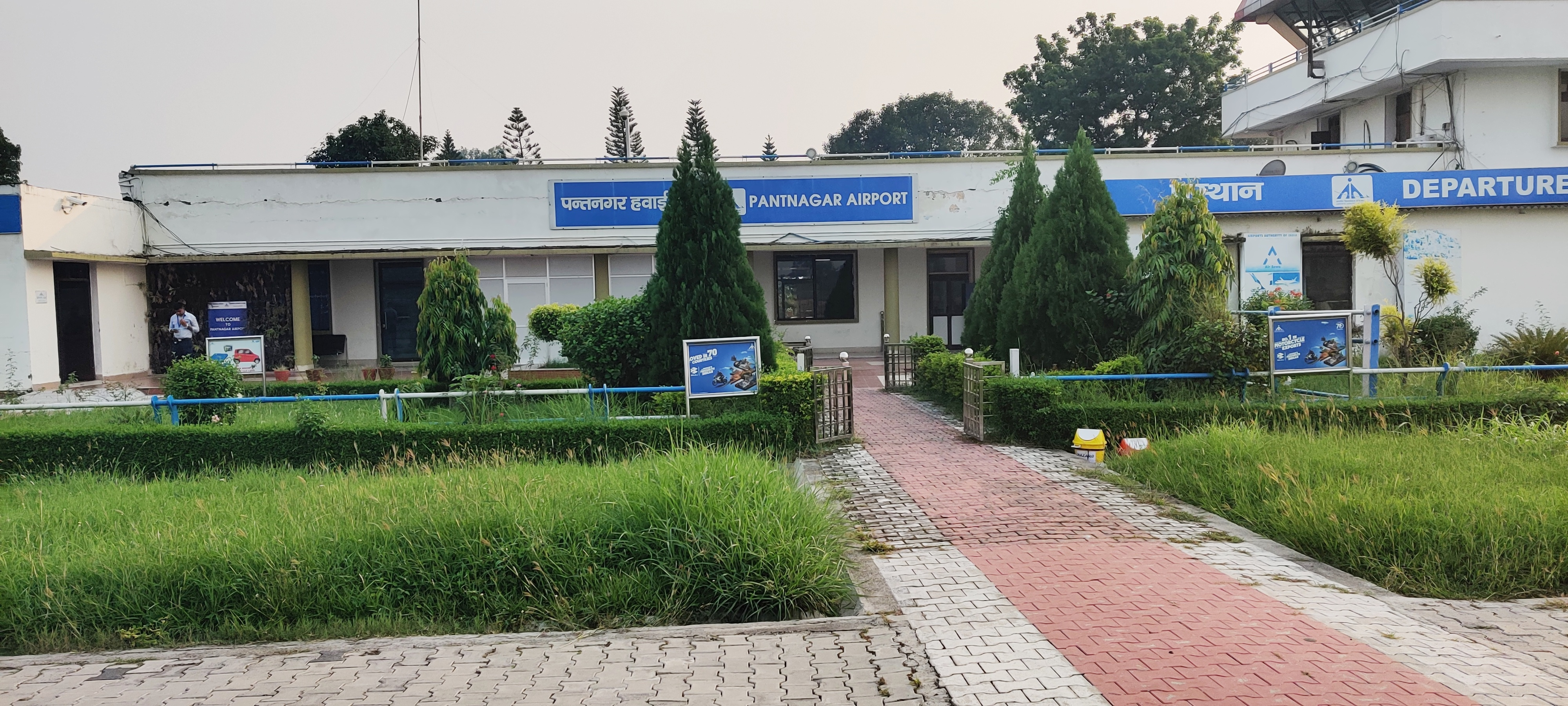
- IATA: PGH; ICAO: VIPT

Summary
- Airport type: Public
- Owner: Government of Uttarakhand
- Operator: Airports Authority of India
- Serves: Pantnagar, Rudrapur, Haldwani and Kichha
- Location: Pantnagar, Uttarakhand, India
- Elevation AMSL: 233 m (764 ft)
- Coordinates: 29°01′56″N 079°28′27″E
- Website: Pantnagar Airport

Map
- Location of airport in Uttarakhand PGH (India)

Runways
Direction	Length		Surface
Direction	m	ft	Surface
10/28	1,372	4,500	Asphalt

Statistics (April 2025 – March 2026)
- Passengers: 71,656 (▼ -29.1%)
- Aircraft movements: 1,300 (▼ -39.8%)
- Cargo tonnage: 0 ( 0%)
- Source: AAI

Pantnagar Airport (IATA: PGH, ICAO: VIPT) is a domestic airport serving Pantnagar and its adjoining regions, located in the Udham Singh Nagar district in of Uttarakhand, India. It is operated by the Airports Authority of India. It is the nearest airport to the Kumaon division and is located in the middle of Haldwani and Rudrapur, the two largest cities of Kumaon. It is 26 km from Haldwani and from the Kumaon hill stations of Nainital (65 km), Bhimtal (50 km), Ranikhet (110 km) and Almora (120 km), Bareilly (65 km) and the Jim Corbett National Park (120 km).

== History ==
The airport was able to accommodate only small aircraft until 2008, when the length of the runway was increased to 4,500 feet to accommodate larger turboprop aircraft at a cost of ₹75 crores.

The Government of Uttarakhand had offered a subsidy to Jagson Airlines between 2005 and 2008, to undertake daily scheduled flights between Pantnagar and Indira Gandhi International Airport, Delhi. The annual subsidy was not renewed in 2008 when the runway length was increased. The government then invited Deccan Aviation to fly on the Delhi – Pantnagar route. Kingfisher Airlines, which took over Deccan Aviation, undertook seasonal flights to Pantnagar as poor weather did not allow it to fly around the year. The airport had been without a commercial service ever since Kingfisher ceased operations. Pantnagar Airport now has daily Alliance Air flights to and from IGI, Delhi (since 1 October 2014).

In August 2015, the Airport Advisory Committee said that the airport will be developed in cargo hub and the length of the runway would be increased from its present length of 1,372 m to 1,865 m.

== Airlines and destinations ==
Airlines	Destinations
IndiGo	Delhi, Noida

== See also ==
- List of airports in India
