= Sher-e-Kashmir University of Agricultural Sciences and Technology of Jammu =

Agricultural university in Jammu, India

Coordinates: 32.655°N 74.807°E

- Type: State agricultural university
- Established: September 20, 1999; 26 years ago
- Affiliations: ICAR
- Chancellor: Lieutenant Governor of Jammu and Kashmir
- Vice-Chancellor: Dr. Bhupendra Nath Tripathi
- Location: Chatha, Jammu district, Jammu & Kashmir, India
- Website: www.skuast.org

Sher-e-Kashmir University of Agricultural Sciences and Technology of Jammu (SKUAST-J) is an agriculture university located in the town of Chatha, in the Jammu district of the Indian union territory of Jammu and Kashmir. SKUAST-J came into existence on 20 September 1999 following the amendment in Sher-e-Kashmir University of Agricultural Sciences and Technology Act 1982 through the State legislature. The university inherited few assets and staff deployed at various stations and sub-stations from erstwhile SKUAST (J&K) to carry on the mission of agriculture research and development. Currently Faculty of Agriculture, Faculty of Basic Sciences, Faculty of Dairy Technology, Faculty of Agricultural Engineering, Faculty of Horticulture & Forestry and School of Biotechnology are located at Chatha (Main Campus), Jammu whereas the Faculty of Veterinary Sciences and Animal Husbandry (F.V.Sc & A.H) is located at R. S. Pura, Jammu.

== History ==
The Sher-e-Kashmir University of Agricultural Sciences and Technology, J & K was established in 1982 with the objectives of catering to the research, education and extension education requirements of the state. The entire educational infrastructure like colleges of Agriculture, Veterinary and Forestry came up in Kashmir province only and major infrastructure for research and extension was also developed in the same region.

Subsequently, demand for the establishment of a separate Agriculture University for Jammu region was desired because the Jammu region is different from the Kashmir division with regard to its livestock, type and pattern of cropping and other factors. The problems of Jammu region are location-specific in research on crops, pulses, fruits, oil-seeds, vegetables, agriculture, species of livestock and poultry.

Keeping these considerations in view, the then Prime Minister of India, Sh. H.D. Deve Gowda, during his visit to Jammu in 1996, announced the establishment of a separate Agricultural University for Jammu region. His successor-in-office, Sh. I. K. Gujral, subsequently reiterated this commitment.

Following these announcements, the Indian Council of Agricultural Research (ICAR) constituted a committee popularly known as the Madan Committee. The Committee recommended, in principle, the establishment of the separate Agricultural University for Jammu. Accordingly, the Sher-e-Kashmir University of Agricultural Sciences & Technology Act of 1982 was amended by the State legislature providing for a separate Agricultural University by the same name (SKUAST of Jammu).

== Rankings ==
The NIRF (National Institutional Ranking Framework) ranked it 20th among Agriculture institutes in India in 2024.

Faculties and Institute

- Faculty of Agriculture
- Faculty of Veterinary Sciences and Animal Husbandry
- Faculty of Basic Sciences
- Faculty of Horticulture and Forestry
- Faculty of Dairy Technology
- Faculty of Agricultural Engineering
- Institute of Biotechnology

Krishi Vigyan Kendra (KVKs)

- KVK जम्मू
- KVK रियासी
- KVK राजौरी
- KVK भद्रवाह
- KVK सांभा
- KVK कठुआ
- KVK पुंछ
- KVK रामबन
- KVK किश्तवाड़

== Research stations, substations, and centres ==
- Regional Agricultural Research Station, Rajouri
- Dryland Research Sub-station, Dhiansar
- Rain fed Research Sub-station for tropical Fruits, Raya
- Regional Horticulture Research Sub-station, Bhaderwah
- Pulses Research Sub-station, Samba
- Maize Breeding Research Sub-station, Poonch
- Water Management Research Centre, Chatha
- Cropping System Research, Chatha
- Seed Production Farm, Chakroi, R.S Pura
- All India Maize Improvement Project, Udhampur
