= Veer Chandra Singh Garhwali Uttarakhand University of Horticulture and Forestry =

Agricultural university in Uttarakhand, India

Coordinates: 30.0640219°N 78.9889101°E

- Former name: Uttarakhand Krishi Evam Prodyogik Vishwavidyalaya
- Type: State university
- Established: 2011; 15 years ago
- Affiliations: UGC, ICAR, MHRD
- Chancellor: Governor of Uttarakhand
- Vice-Chancellor: Dr. Bhagwati Prasad Bhatt
- Location: Bharsar and Ranichauri, Uttarakhand, India
- Campus: Rural
- Website: uuhf.ac.in

Veer Chandra Singh Garhwali Uttarakhand University of Horticulture & Forestry, formerly Uttarakhand University of Horticulture and Forestry, is a state agricultural university located in North Indian state of Uttarakhand. The University has two campuses, one is in Bharsar town of Pauri Garhwal district and other is in Ranichauri town of Tehri Garhwal district.

== History ==
The Uttarakhand University of Horticulture and Forestry was established in 2011 by an act (Act No. 13 of 2011) passed by Uttarakhand Legislative Assembly in April 2011.

In 2015 it was renamed through The Uttarakhand Krishi Evam Prodyogik Vishwavidyalaya (Second Amendment) Act, 2014.

== Campus ==
=== Bharsar campus ===
VCSG College of Horticulture is situated at Bharsar in Pabao Block of District Pauri Garhwal on Pauri - Ramnagar Highway (NH- 121) about 57 km from Pauri. It is spread over an area of 175 hectares consisting of forest and orchards at an altitude ranging between 1800 and 2300 m above msl. The geographical and climatic conditions of the region are considered to be ideal for Horticulture. The College has been named in the honour of freedom fighter Late Veer Chandra Singh Garhwali who was associated with Peshawar events of 1931

=== Ranichauri campus ===
The College of Forestry situated at Ranichauri in Tehri Garhwal about 15 km from New Tehri, 71 km from Rishikesh and 110 km from Dehradun on Rishikesh - New Tehri Road. It is spread over an area of 203 hectares consisting of forest, orchards and various research blocks at an altitude ranging between 1700 and 2200 m above msl. The geographical and climatic conditions of the region are considered to be suitable for different forest species, wild fruits, horticultural crops, off season vegetables, medicinal and aromatic plants, minor millets and pulses.

== Academics ==
- College of Horticulture, Bharsar, Pauri Garhwal, Uttarakhand
- College of Forestry, Ranichauri, Tehri Garhwal, Uttarakhand
- College of Hill Agriculture, Chirbatiya, Rudraprayag, Uttarakhand
- Institute of Medicinal and Aromatic Plants, Gairsain, Rudraprayag, Uttarakhand
- Institute of Food Science & Technology, Majrigrant, Dehradun
