= Agricultural Universities =

Type of educational institution

Agricultural Universities (AUs) are mostly public universities in India that are engaged in teaching, research and extension in agriculture and related disciplines. In India, agricultural education has evolved into a large and distinct domain, often separately from other areas of higher education. Many of these universities are member of a registered society, the Indian Agricultural Universities Association. Indian Council of Agricultural Research is the main regulatory authority of agricultural education in India, while the disciplines of veterinary medicine and forestry are regulated by the Veterinary Council of India and Indian Council of Forestry Research and Education respectively. Based on the statutes establishing these universities, agricultural universities in India can be grouped into various types.

== State Agricultural Universities ==
State Agricultural Universities (SAUs) are the predominant class of agricultural universities in India. A SAU is usually a university established by an act of state legislature with a dedicated mandate of teaching, research and extension in agriculture and related disciplines.

=== History of SAUs ===
After Independence, one of the greatest challenge before India was agriculture and rural development. This necessitated the availability of trained human resources in these areas. The first Education Commission of India (1949), headed by Sarvepalli Radhakrishnan, recommended setting up rural universities in India on the American land-grant model. In the 1950s, Indian Parliament was already setting up specialized engineering universities – Indian Institutes of Technology – as Institutes of National Importance. However, the Parliament had limited mandate in establishing such specialized institutions for agricultural education, despite the urgent need, as the Constitution of India had conferred the power to make laws in subjects of agriculture (including agricultural research and education) exclusively in the domain of the states.

The state of Uttar Pradesh (UP) took the first step for establishing an agricultural university in 1954, when it invited an Indo American team headed by Dr K R Damle, the Vice-President of Indian Council of Agricultural Research (ICAR), to consider an area around Tarai State farm in Nainital district as a possible site for a rural university. Encouraged by the favourable view of the Damle team, senior UP government officials H S Sandhu and A N Jha visited the United States to look for collaborations with US universities. In consultation with University of Illinois dean Dr H W Hannah, the state of UP presented a proposal to the central government in 1956 for establishing a land-grant style university. Thereafter, a contract was signed between the Government of India, the Technical Cooperation Mission and a few US land-grant universities, to promote agricultural education in India. The US universities included the University of Tennessee, Ohio State University, Kansas State University, the University of Illinois, Pennsylvania State University and the University of Missouri.

The UP Act XI-V of 1958 – the founding legislative act for establishing an agricultural university – was promulgated by state legislature of UP. The task of mentoring the proposed university in UP was assigned to the University of Illinois, which signed a contract in 1959. Thus, the first state agricultural university of India, G. B. Pant University of Agriculture and Technology, was established in Pantnagar (then in Uttar Pradesh, now in Uttarakhand). It was inaugurated by the first Prime Minister of India Jawaharlal Nehru on 17 November 1960. The model of establishing Pantnagar University paved the way for establishing state government supported dedicated universities for agricultural education, i.e. SAUs, in India. There are 54 SAUs in India.

=== Features of SAUs ===
SAUs are characterized by their triple mandate of teaching, research and agricultural extension. Since the initial SAUs were established with technical cooperation from United States land-grant universities, their academic programmes are strongly influenced by the American system and present a departure from the academic system prevailing in other general universities in India. The undergraduate degree programs of SAUs are of minimum four years' duration. Since their inception, SAUs have followed a trimester or a semester system with credit-based, continuous evaluation on a 5-point or 10-point GPA scale. This is different from general universities, which usually follow a yearly term and percentage based end-session evaluation. As envisioned in ICAR's Model Act for Agricultural Universities, most SAUs are non-affiliating universities/ However, SAUs in states like Maharashtra, Tamil Nadu, Chhattisgarh etc. have affiliated private agricultural colleges. SAUs also have territorial jurisdiction.

== Deemed universities ==
Deemed universities are not established by an act of independent legislation, but declared to function as universities by Government of India under Section 3 of the University Grants Commission Act 1956. As per this section, "The Central Government may, on the advice of the Commission, declare by notification in the Official Gazette, that any institution for higher education, other than a University, shall be deemed to be a University for the purposes of this Act, and on such a declaration being made, all the provisions of this Act shall apply to such institution as if it were a University within the meaning of clause (f) of section 2". Thus, the provision of deemed universities enables the central government to incorporate an agricultural university without the need of Parliamentary legislation, thus circumventing the complexities of federal division for legislative powers, which has put agriculture in the state list.

There are seven AUs under the deemed university category, and a further proposal to establish six more deemed universities for agriculture in the 12th Five-year plan. Most of these deemed universities are sponsored by Indian Council of Agricultural Research (ICAR) and have small academic programmes as compared to SAUs. A few of these universities, like Allahabad Agricultural Institute and Indian Agricultural Research Institute, have contributed significantly to research in agricultural science.

== Central agricultural universities ==
Notwithstanding the limited power of the Indian Parliament for legislating on subjects of state list such as agriculture (including agricultural research and education), there are certain provisions in the Constitution of India which allows it to legislate on these matters in certain conditions, such as when the Rajya Sabha passes a resolution to this effect by two-thirds majority (Article 249) or when legislatures of two or more states pass a resolution to do so (Article 252) or to implement decisions taken in international conferences (Article 253).

The Central Agricultural University at Imphal, Manipur was incorporated by an act of Parliament (No.4 of 1992) and caters to many states in Northeast India. So far, it is the only Central Agricultural University (CAU). There are proposals and demands to establish more CAUs.

The Rani Lakshmi Bai Central Agricultural University Bill was introduced in the Rajya Sabha on 22 May 2012; it aims to incorporate a CAU at Jhansi catering to the Bundelkhand region spanning the two states of Uttar Pradesh and Madhya Pradesh.

The Parliament passed the Finance Bill 2012–2013 for budgetary allocation for establishing a CAU in Bihar. On 11 May 2016 Parliament of India passed the Central University Bill. So RAU, Pusa has been upgraded to Central University and named as Dr. Rajendra Prasad Central Agriculture University.

Chief Minister of Orissa has demanded setting up a CAU in Kalahandi Balangir Koraput Region. The West Bengal government placed a proposal before the centre to set up a CAU at Goaltore in West Midnapore district on a 1,000-acre (4.0 km^{2}) land parcel.

Some of the older SAUs, like Pantnagar University and Punjab Agricultural University, are demanding to be converted into central universities.

== See also ==
- List of agricultural universities in India
- List of universities in India
