= V. R. Panchamukhi =

Indian economist and Sanskrit scholar

- Vadirajacharya Panchamukhi
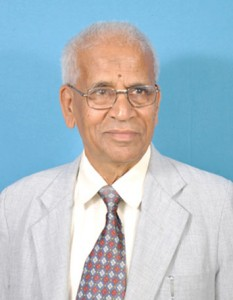
- Born: Vadirajacharya Raghavendracharya Panchamukhi; 17 September 1936; Bagalkot, Karnataka
- Spouse: Vedavati V. Panchamukhi

Academic background
- Education: Karnataka University; Bombay University; Delhi School of Economics; Delhi University
- Awards: President of India's Certificate of Honour for Sanskrit 2003; Sri Gurusarvabhoma Raghavendra Prashasti - Sri Raghavendra Swami Mutt, Mantralayam, 2016; Panchajanya Puraskara, 2014

V. R. Panchamukhi (also referred to as Vadiraj Panchamukhi, and Vachaspati V. R. Panchamukhi), is an Indian Economist and Sanskrit scholar. He was born on September 17, 1936, in Dharwad, Karnataka. He is the eldest son of Vidyaratna Shri R. S. Panchamukhi, an archaeologist and indologist and Sanskrit Scholar. V. R. Panchamukhi has been honored with the Padma Shri, the fourth highest Indian civilian award, for his contributions to the literature and education on 26 January 2025 by the Government of India.

== Early life ==
Vadiraj was born in Bagalkot, Karnataka to a Madhwa Brahmin, to Vidyaratna Shri Raghavendracharya, S. Panchamukhi and Kamalabai R. Panchamukhi. He is the sixth child after five sisters.

His father was a renowned epigraphist, archaeologist and Indologist, who dedicated his life to historical research and Indological studies. He was a pioneer in Daasa Sahitya research. His mother built a value system based on the heritage of daasara padagalu. Vadiraj had his early education in Sanskrit and philosophy under the tutelage of his father.

He stood 1st class 1st rank in Karnataka University studying mathematics and statistics in 1956. He was the first to achieve 82.5%. He also achieved 1st rank in Bombay University doing his master's degree in statistics with econometrics in 1958, for which he was awarded the Chancellor's Gold Medal. He completed his Ph.D. in Delhi School of Economics in 1963 with his thesis on 'Applications of Game Theory to Economic Policy and Planning with Illustrations from International Trade and Investments.'

== Career ==
He has made significant contributions in economics and Sanskrit.

=== Economics ===
Panchamukhi contributed to the field of economics in multiple ways. His work on the applications of game theory to International Trade Policy analysis was noted as a pioneering work by Jagdish Bhagwati in his Survey of Literature published in the Economic Journal of London School of Economics (1975). His work on 'Effective Rates of Protection and Domestic Resource Cost', prepared and published jointly with Bhagwati and T. N. Srinivasan, made a significant impact on the trade policy regimes of the 1960s and 1970s.

He worked on development models and resource gaps for the countries of the United Nations Economic and Social Commission for Asia and the Pacific (ESCAP) region that were presented under the leadership of Nobel Laureate Jan Tinbergen while he was a staff member of the ESCAP (then ECAFE). This became the basis for Resource Transfer for Development in the ESCAP region in the 1970s. He delivered a lecture at the Special Session of the ESCAP (held in Shanghai, China) on 'Theme of Strategy for Least Developed Countries.' This was used for many resolutions at the ESCAP Special Session.

He was invited to work at the South Centre (organization), Geneva, by Julius Nyerere, the former President of Tanzania, and the then Chairman of the group. His analytical paper on the proposed Multilateral Agreement on Investment was utilized for negotiations at the WTO Ministerial Meetings (Singapore) in the 1990s.

He developed the "Research Information System (RIS)" for the Non-Aligned and other Developing Countries (an autonomous body established by the Ministry of External Affairs (India) in 1984) into an important 'think tank' of the developing world. It provided analytical inputs on international economic topics such as WTO, regional cooperation, investment flows and many others.

He was the Member Secretary of the "P. C. Alexander Committee on Import–Export Policies and Procedures" in 1977 that made path-breaking contributions to the process of liberalization of the trade policy regime in India.

=== Sanskrit ===
Panchamukhi wrote multiple books in Sanskrit on the themes of Economics and Management. He composed and published many Sanskrit poems.

As the Chancellor of Rashtriya Sanskrit Vidyapeetha, Tirupathi, for two terms (1998 - 2008), he was instrumental in launching innovative programs such as Sanskrit–Science exhibitions, Sansk-Net, and Digitization of Sanskrit Manuscripts. He launched a new department of Dvaita Vedanta at Rashtriya Sanskrit Vidyapeetha.

He was a board member of Tirumala Tirupati Devasthanams (TTD). He helped build the constitution and enabled the establishment of Sri Venkateswara Vedic University, Tirumala.

Research interests include Bhagavad Gita and Management, ancient Indian thoughts on development, relevance of Sanskrit in modern times and Sanskrit and Science.

He wrote books in which he interpreted the Bhagavad Gita and applied its principles to a modern and contemporary time. He delivered a complete series on "Srimad Bhagavad Gita — Its relevance to contemporary life" which was telecast by SVBC TV (Sri Venkateswara Bhakthi Channel, TTD).

== Positions held ==
=== Executive positions ===
- Chairman, Indian Council of Social Science Research (ICSSR)
- Managing Editor, Indian Economic Journal, Indian Economic Association
- Managing Trustee, Indian Economic Association Trust for Research and Development
- Vice-Chairman, Indian Economic Association Trust for Research and Development
- Vice President, Sukhamoy Chakravarty Memorial Trust
- Honorary Visiting Professor, Institute for Social and Economic Change (ISEC)
- President, South Asian Association for Regional Cooperation (SAARC) Economic Association
- President, Indian Economic Association, 1994
- President, The Indian Econometric Society, 1998, 1999, 2000
- Convener, VIII World Economic Congress (New Delhi), 1986
- Founder Director General, Research and Information System for the Non Aligned & Developing Countries (now RIS for Developing Countries)
- Hon.Chairman, Board of Governors, Academy of Grassroots Studies and Research of India (AGRASRI), Tirupati, AP
- Member, Research Staff, United Nations Industrial Development Organization (UNIDO), Vienna
- Research Professor, Centre for Policy Research, New Delhi
- Professor of Economics, Institute of Economic Growth, Delhi University
- Economic Advisor, Ministry of Finance (India)
- Hon.Chairman, Board of Advisers, Academy of Grassroots Studies and Research of India (AGRASRI), Tirupati, AP
- Member Secretary, P. C. Alexander Committee on Import-Export Policies and Procedures
- Chief of Research and Analysis Division, Trade Development Authority (TDA), New Delhi; Executive Director of TDA in 1977-79
- Economic Affairs Officer, Research and Planning Division, United Nations Economic and Social Commission for Asia and the Pacific (UNESCAP)
- Lecturer, Department of Statistics, Bombay University
- Senior Research Officer/Reader in Econometrics, Department of Economics, Bombay University

He served as consultant to several UN bodies including UNCTAD, UNDP, ILO and multilateral bodies like World Bank, IMF and inter-governmental bodies like G-77 and Non-Aligned Movement (NAM).

- Chancellor, Rashtriya Sanskrit Vidyapeetham (Deemed University), Tirupathi, for two consecutive terms
- President, Akhila Bharata Madhva Sammelana, Udupi

=== Advisory positions ===
- Founding Member, Madras School of Economics
- Founding Member, Indian Council for Research on International Economic Relations
- Member, Board of Directors, Indian Overseas Bank
- Member, Board of Directors, Risk Capital and Technology Finance Corporation Ltd.
- Member, Board of Directors, Industrial Finance Corporation of India (IFCI Ltd); Nominee of IDBI
- Member, Board of Governors, Sri Ram Centre for Industrial Relations
- Member, Governing Body, Centre for Multi-Disciplinary Development Research (CMDR), Dharwad
- Member, Governing Body, Institute of Labour Development, Jaipur
- Member, Governing Body, Indian Institute of Foreign Trade
- Member, Governing Body, Indian Council of South Asian Co-operation
- Member, Academic Council, Jawaharlal Nehru University

He continues his active pursuits of research and knowledge dissemination as:

- Chancellor (currently), Sri Gurusarvabhouma Sanskrit Vidyapeetham, Mantralayam (AP)
- Executive Director, Gurusarvabhouma Samsodhan Mandir, Mantralayam
- Chairman, The Indian Econometric Society Trust
- President, National Institute of Vedic Science, Bangalore

== Books and publications ==
=== In economics ===
Panchamukhi's deep insight into various aspects of economics can be seen in the books authored by him.

- Trade Policies of India - A Quantitative Analysis; Concept Publishers 1978
- Production & Planning - A Quantitative Study of the Regional Economy of Karnataka; Centre for Multi-Disciplinary Development Research 1981
- Capital Formation & Output in the Third World; Radiant Publishers for RIS 1986
- The Third World and World Economic System (jointly with K M Raipuria, Rajesh Mehta and Nagesh Kumar); Radiant Publishers for RIS 1986
- Planning, Development and the World Economic Order; Radiant Publishers for RIS 1987
- Process of Development in Indian Economy (edited jointly with Prof. P R Brahmananda); Himalaya Publishers 1987
- Money and Finance in World Economic Order (edited jointly with K M Raipuria and Rameshwar Tandon); INDUS Publishing House 1987
- Sector Propositions (Vol. 2) of the Balance between Industry & Agriculture in Economic Development (edited jointly with Jeffrey G. Williamson); Macmillans 1988
- Export Financing in India (jointly with others); Research & Information System 1991
- Teaching Economics in India (jointly edited); Interest Publications 1991
- Indian Economy: Policy Perspective (jointly edited); Interest Publications 1991
- Econometric Modeling and Forecasting in Asia (edited with ESCAP); United Nations 1991
- Fiscal Management of the Indian Economy; Interest Publications 1992
- Complementarity in Trade and Production Intra-South Potentials (jointly with others); SAGE Publications 1995
- Towards an Asian Economic Area (edited jointly with Dr. Rehman Sobhan, Bangladesh); Macmillan India 1995

=== In Sanskrit and philosophy ===
Panchamukhi has written several books on Indology and Philosophy in Sanskrit, Kannada and English.

- भारतीय आर्थिक सर्वेक्षण (संस्कृत) (Economic Survey of India); Rashtriya Sanskrit Vidyapeetham, Tirupathi 2000
- Managing One-self: Sri Bhagavad Gita - Theory & Practice; Motilal Banarasidas 2000
- Indian Classical Thoughts on Economic Development and Management; Bookwell Publication 2000
- काव्यकुसुमाकर: (Kavyakusumakara) - collection of Sanskrit Poems; Rashtriya Sanskrit Vidyapeetham, Tirupathi 2002
- Human Science in Indian Heritage; Amar Granth Publications for National Institute of Vedic Sciences, Bangalore
- Badarayana's Brahma Sutras - Essentials of Madhwa Philosophy; Interest Publications 1989
- ब्रह्मसूत्रदीपिका (BrahmaSutraDipika) - English Notes based on Tantradipika of Sri Raghavendra Tirtha and Sutradipika of Sri Jagannatha Thirtha; Rashtriya Sanskrit Vidyapeetham, Tirupathi 2002
- श्रीमन्युसूक्त (Shri Manyu Suktam) - English and Kannada translation based on the commentary of Sri Dheerendra Thirtha; Independent Publication
- Shri Yogeendra Taravali - Kannada and English translation of the composition of Sri Sumatindratirtha; Sri Guru Sarvabhowma Sanskrita Vidyapeetham 1993
- Sri Bhagavadgita and the Mind - lecture series conducted at Vienna; Independent publication
- विचारवैभवं (Vicharavaibhavam) - Essays on Indology; Rashtriya Sanskrit Vidyapeetham, Tirupathi 2000
- भारतीय अर्थशास्त्रं (Sanskrit) (Bharatiya ArthaShastram); Rashtriya Sanskrit Samsthanam, New Delhi, 1998

Panchamukhi has authored several monographs, translations and short essays. He has delivered thought provoking convocation addresses as the Chancellor and Chief Guest to several universities.

== Awards and recognition ==
He has won several awards and citations for his scholarly contributions to Economics and Indology

- President of India's Certificate of Honour for Sanskrit 2003
- Vishishta Sanskrita Seva Vrati - Rashtriya Sanskritha Samsthanam, New Delhi
- Vachaspathi - Lal Bahadur Shastri Sanskrit University, New Delhi 2008
- Bharatratna M Vishweshwarayya Prasasti - Swadeshi Vijnana Sammelana, Gulbarga University, Karnataka
- Karnataka Rajyotsava Award - Government of Karnataka
- Sri Gurusarvabhoma Raghavendra Anugraha Prashasti - Sri Raghavendra Swami Mutt, Mantralayam, 2016
- GITAM Foundation Annual Award - GITAM University, Vishakhapatnam, 2013
- 2025: Padma Shri
