= List of Sanskrit universities in India =

The Sanskrit Universities are specialized universities that aim to promote and spread Sanskrit education, shastraic education and related research.

The following is a list of at least 18 Sanskrit universities in India (3 central, 1 deemed and 14 state universities) which are only focused on Sanskrit revival and Sanskrit studies along with related disciplines like Ayurveda.

Year Est.	Name, place	District	State	Type	Notes
1791	Sampurnanand Sanskrit Vishwavidyalaya (former Government Sanskrit College)	Varanasi	Uttar Pradesh	University	(during Governor General Cornwallis)
1821	Poona Sanskrit College (Deccan College)	Pune	Maharashtra	Deemed University	(during Governor General Francis Hastings)
1824	The Sanskrit College and University	Kolkata	West Bengal	University	(during Governor General Amherst)
1961	Kameshwar Singh Darbhanga Sanskrit University	Darbhanga	Bihar	University	
1962	National Sanskrit University	Tirupati	Andhra Pradesh	Central University	
1962	Shri Lal Bahadur Shastri National Sanskrit University	New Delhi	Delhi	Central University	
1970	Central Sanskrit University	New Delhi	Delhi	Central University	
1981	Shree Jagannath Sanskrit University	Puri	Odisha	University	
1993	Sree Sankaracharya University of Sanskrit, Kalady	Kochi	Kerala	University	
1997	Kavikulaguru Kalidas Sanskrit University, Ramtek	Nagpur	Maharashtra	University	
2001	Jagadguru Ramanandacharya Rajasthan Sanskrit University	Jaipur	Rajasthan	University	
2005	Uttarakhand Sanskrit University	Haridwar	Uttarakhand	University	
2005	Shree Somnath Sanskrit University, Veraval	Veraval	Gujarat	University	
2006	Sri Venkateswara Vedic University, Tirumala	Tirupati	Andhra Pradesh	University	
2008	Maharshi Panini Sanskrit Evam Vedic Vishwavidyalaya	Ujjain	Madhya Pradesh	University	
2011	Karnataka Samskrit University	Bengaluru	Karnataka	University	
2011	Kumar Bhaskar Varma Sanskrit and Ancient Studies University	Nalbari	Assam	University	
2018	Maharishi Valmiki Sanskrit University	Kaithal	Haryana	University	
2016	Chinmaya Vishwavidyapeeth	Kochi	Kerala	Deemed University	
1918	Faculty of Sanskrit Vidya Dharma Vigyan, Banaras Hindu University	Varanasi	UP	School	

== See also ==
- List of Sanskrit academic institutes outside India
