= Syed Sallauddin Pasha =

Indian dancer

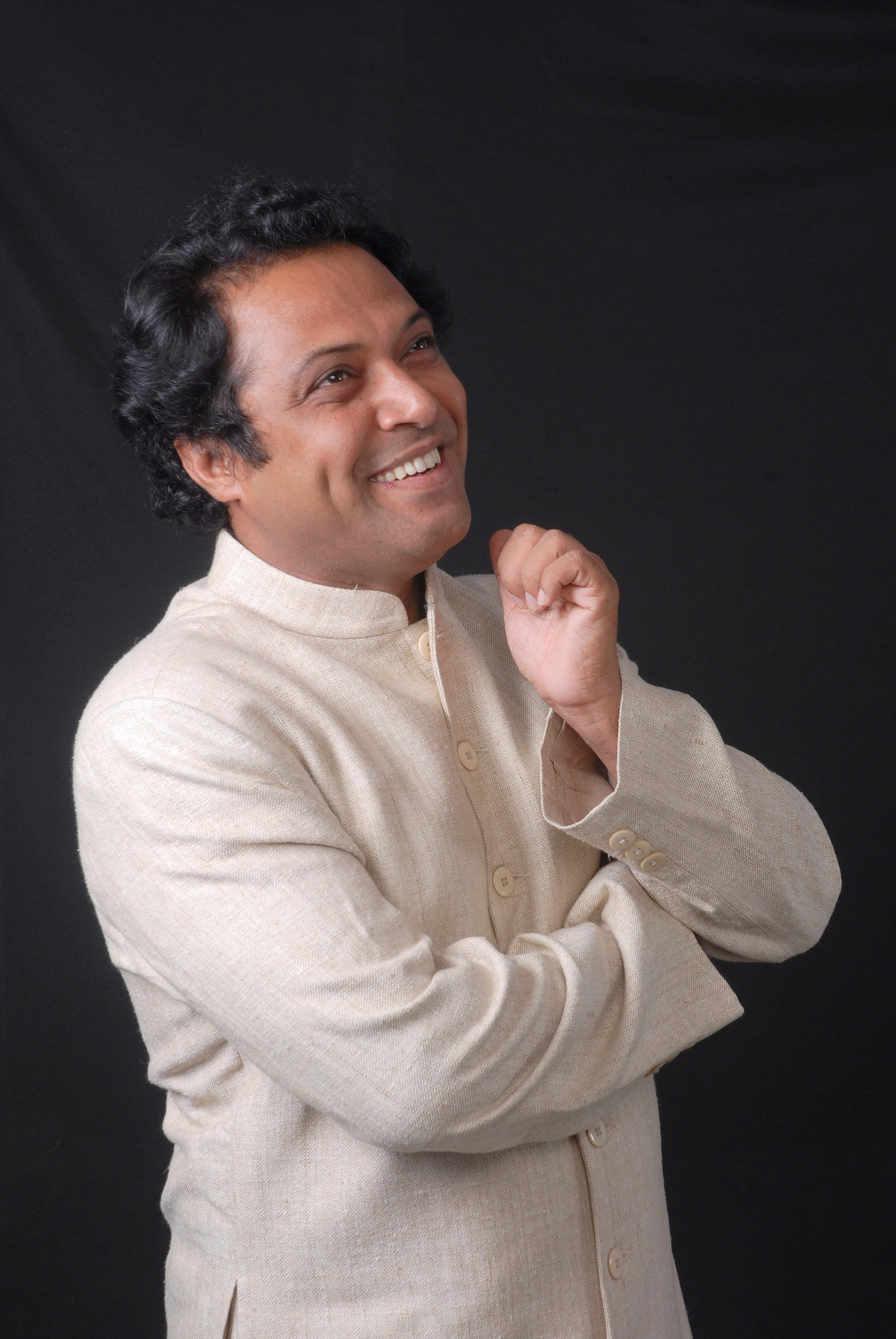
- Syed Sallauddin Pasha
- Born: 15 June 1968 (age 58); Anekal, Karnataka, India
- Education: Bangalore University
- Occupations: Bharatanatyam and kathak dancer, actor, director, choreographer, therapeutic theater director for persons with special needs
- Years active: 1983–present
- Website: syedsallauddinpasha.com

Syed Sallauddin Pasha is a Bharatanatyam and Kathak dancer, Choreographer, Actor and Founder, artistic director of Ability Unlimited, Miracle on Wheels and a therapeutic dance theater on Wheelchairs in India. He is recognised for his pioneering theater productions for persons with disabilities. In 2007 he received the National Award for the welfare of persons with disabilities in 2007–08 from Pratibha Patil.

Pasha is a Limca Book of Records holder for creating 100 dance theater productions and directing over 10,000 performances with people of different – abilities. His student Gulshan Kumar entered in the Guinness Book of World Records for spinning his wheelchair 63 times in one minute in 2011.

Pasha is a trained and established Bharatanatyam Dancer. He is also an empanelled Bharatnatyam, Kathak and theater artist with the Indian Council for Cultural Relations, and an 'A Grade' Dancer of Doordarshan, India's National Television Channel. Pasha's group has staged more than 10,000 shows worldwide with disabled dancers, including on International Yoga Day in June, 2015.

== Life and career ==
Syed Sallauddin Pasha, born in 1968, hails from a family of healers from Anekal, Karnataka, India.

As a child, he enacted lead roles in Kannada and Sanskrit plays and Studied Carnatic music from TS Ramamani. He studied Bharatanatyam under late K. P. Kittappa Pillai, S. Narmada and Padmini Rao and Kathak under late Maya Rao.

He graduated as a Choreographer from Natya Institute of Kathak and Choreography, Bangalore University and Pasha studied Pharmacy and registered as pharmacist from Karnataka State Pharmacy Council. He has worked with Theater and Film personalities of the country like B.V. Karanth, M.S. Sathyu of Garm Hava fame and Renuka Sharma, actors Vishnuvardhan and Ramesh Aravind.

He also runs a non-profit organization by the name of Ability Unlimited, dedicated for persons with disabilities.

== Performances and reviews ==
Pasha has promoted dance and movement therapy for people with disabilities.

He directed Europe's biggest therapeutic theater project Ramayana on Wheels with 108 Finnish special children and adults, in collaboration with Espoo, which was performed at International Theater Festival. He has also conducted therapeutic workshops for tsunami victims. He has also orchestrated Durga and Martial Arts on Wheels with 200 disabled children and adults.

His dance productions include Bharatanatyam on wheelchairs, Sufi dance on wheelchairs, Yoga on wheelchairs, Bhagawad Gita on wheelchairs, Ramayana on wheels, Rumi on Wheels, Chariots of the Gods, wheelchair on wings.

Pasha has presented his dance performances at Rastrapati Bhavan for the President of India Pranab Mukherjee. His Miracle on Wheels show for the United Nation Information Centre and Indian Council for UN Relations on 2 May 2015 at FICCI auditorium, New Delhi on the anniversary of Convention on the Rights of Persons with Disabilities.

Pasha presented his Miracle on wheel performance for Taj Mahotsav in February, 2015. He has also presented Kathak Dance Performance in conjunction with the exhibition of "Islamic Art of India" on the occasion of the exhibition launching in March, 2002 at the Islamic Arts Museum Malaysia, officiated by the Prime Minister of Malaysia, Mahathir Mohamad and for the special performance graced by His Majesty Sirajuddin of Perlis, King of Malaysia.

== Work in film and television ==
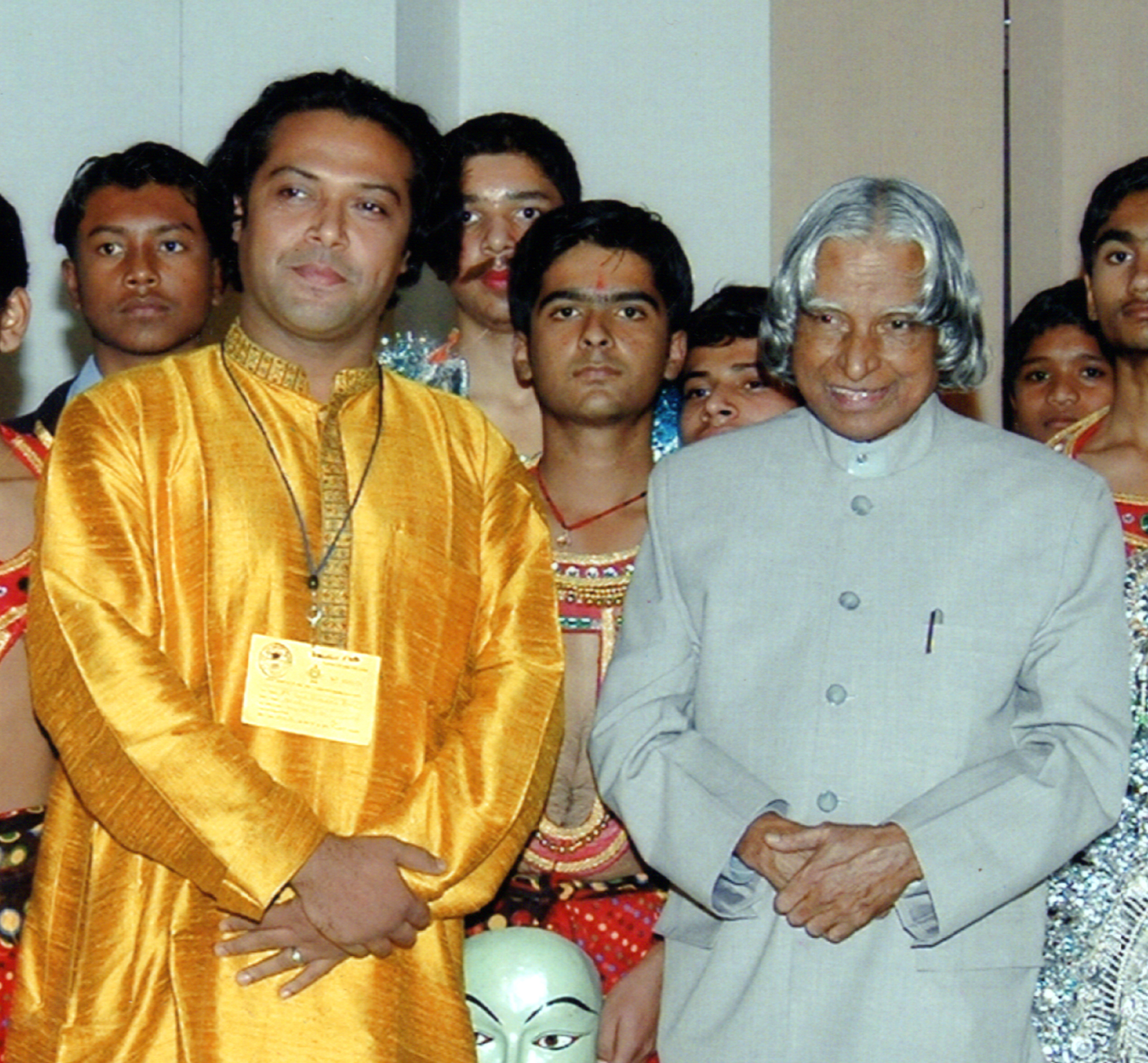
Syed Sallauddin Pasha with former President of India Dr.A.P.J.Abdul Kalam at Balvantray Mehta Vidya Bhawan, Delhi.

Pasha choreographed Chande Pe Dance song for a special episode on the Persons with disabilities in the first season of Aamir Khan's TV series Satyamev Jayate. He has acted as Saint Shishunala Sharif in Kannada tele-serial, Eshwaran Alla Nine Yalla directed by Renuka Sharama. He acted in the Kannada Film Parva with late Kannada superstar Dr.Vishnuvardhan. He danced for M.S. Sathyu's doordarshan serial Kayar in 1992. This serial was based on the novel Kayar originally written in Malayalam by Jnanpith awardee Thakazhi Sivasankara Pillai in 1978. "The novel traces the evolution of the central Travancore society from the early 19th century to the mid-twentieth century. In his masterpiece Kayar (1978) Thakazhi Sivashankara Pillai tells a story spanning more than 200 years, of the rise and fall of different communities in his birth place Kuttanad. While being the history of a region, Kayar captures the essence of the revolutionary shifts in Kerala history, with reference to the changing pattern of land holding."

== Awards and recognition ==
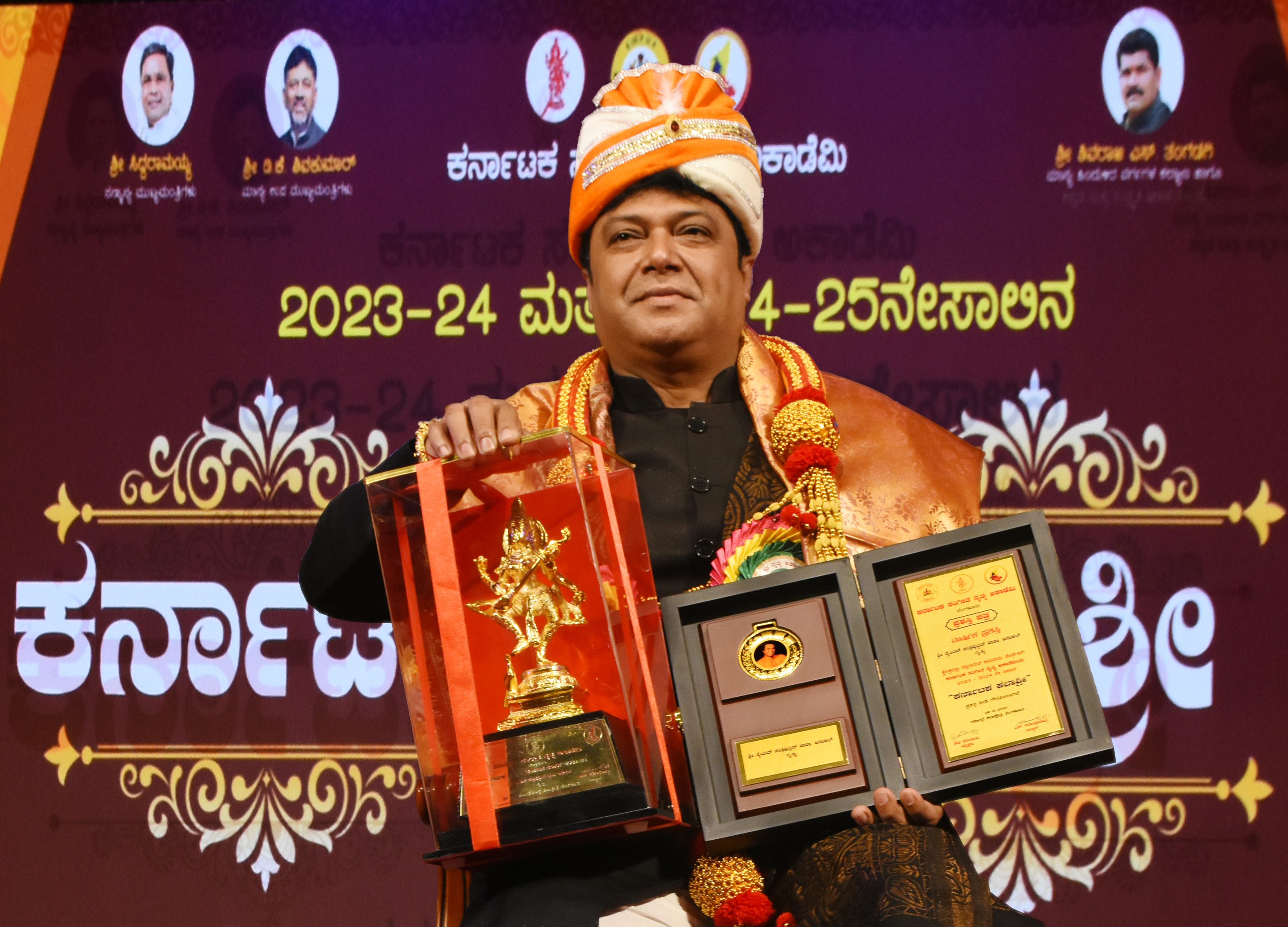
Sallauddin Pasha Receiving Karnataka Kalashree Award from Government of Karnataka at Ravindra Kalakshetra, Bangalore

- 1994 Proclamation from City of Marion Indiana, USA. for presenting First Classical Dances of India Day
- 1995 – 1998 Member of Karnataka Sangeeta Nritya Academy: Nominated by Government of Karnataka, India.
- 2001 Award from Governor of Karnataka V.S.Rama Devi for his outstanding contribution and service for the persons with disabilities.
- 2002 Certificate of Appreciation from Islamic Art Museum Malaysia, launched by Prime Minister of Malaysia, Dato' Seri Dr Mahathir bin Mohammed and Graced by His Majesty, Tuanku Syed Sirajuddin Ibni-Al Marhum Tuanku Syed Putra Jamalullail, King of Malaysia and his Queen.
- 2003 Recognition from Espoo (ESBO) city cultural services for creating Ramayana for more 100 special need children from Finland.
- 2005 Certificate of Appreciation from Action Aid International: for conducting Therapeutic Theatre Play/Workshop for Tsunami affected people at Andaman and Nicobar Islands
- 2006 Certificate of Recognition from Town of Hempstead, New York, USA.
- 2007 National Award for the welfare of persons with disabilities by the Ministry of Social Justice and Empowerment, Government of India.
- 2008 Sanskriti Foundation Award for Social cultural achievement
- 2010 Karmaveer Puraskaar Noble Laureate
- 2012 Attendance award, given by India's only year-book on dance, under category Uday Shankar Choreography award, which recognizes a Choreographer who has set the tone for new directions in Indian dance.
- 2015 He was chosen for the Alva's Nudisiri Award of social services,
- 2020 He has been appointed as Syndicate Member of Karnataka State Dr. Gangubhai Hangal Music and Performing Arts University Mysore.
- 2024 His three decades of innovative work in Classical Wheelchair Dance has been officially recognized as certific ate and diploma courses by Karnataka State Dr. Gangubhai Hangal Music and Performing Arts University, Mysore.
- 2024 He received the Karnataka Kalashree Award, a State Akademi Award and the highest civilian award from the Karnataka Sangeeta Nritya Academy and the Department of Kannada and Culture, under the Government of Karnataka.
- 2024 He received the Kannada Rajyotsava Award from the Anekal Administration in the presence of Anekal Tahsildar, MLA Shivanna, and Anekal Town President on 1 November 2024
- 2025 Guru Syed Sallauddin Pasha has been awarded the prestigious D.Litt (Doctor of Literature) for his groundbreaking thesis, "Natyashastra On Wheels for Persons with Disabilities," by Karnataka State Dr. Gangubhai Hangal Music and Performing Arts University, Mysore. The award ceremony was held in the presence of Vice-Chancellor Nagesh V Bettakote, Dr. M.C. Sudhakar, Minister for Higher Education, Government of Karnataka, Shrinivasa Varakhedi, Vice-Chancellor, Central Sanskrit University, Delhi and other esteemed dignitaries on 18.01.2025 at Mysuru.

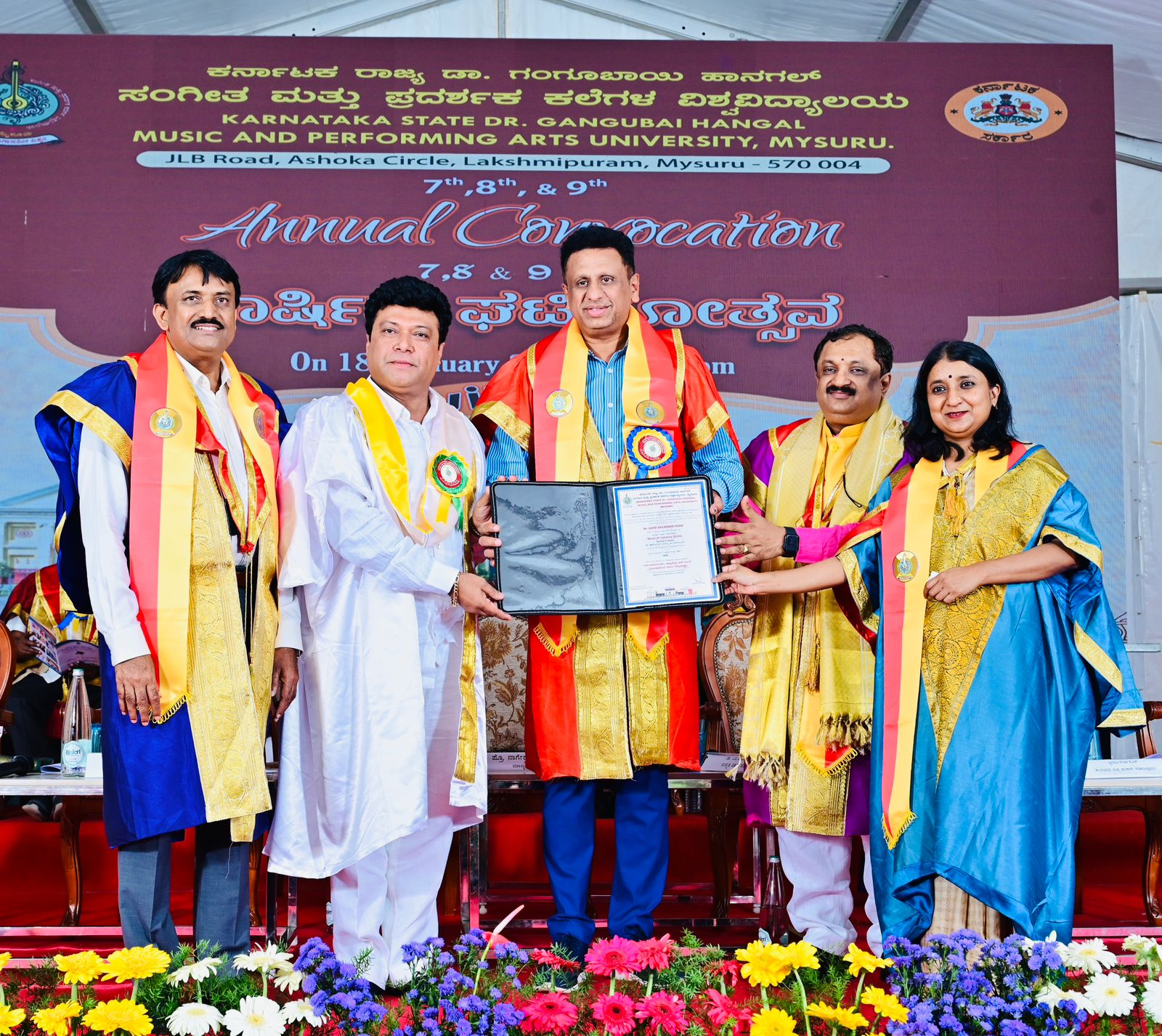
Guru Syed Sallauddin Pasha has been awarded the prestigious D.Litt (Doctor of Literature) by Karnataka State Dr. Gangubhai Hangal Music and Performing Arts University, Mysore.
