= Chamu Krishna Shastry =

Indian educationist (born 1956)

Padmashri Chamu Krishna Shastry
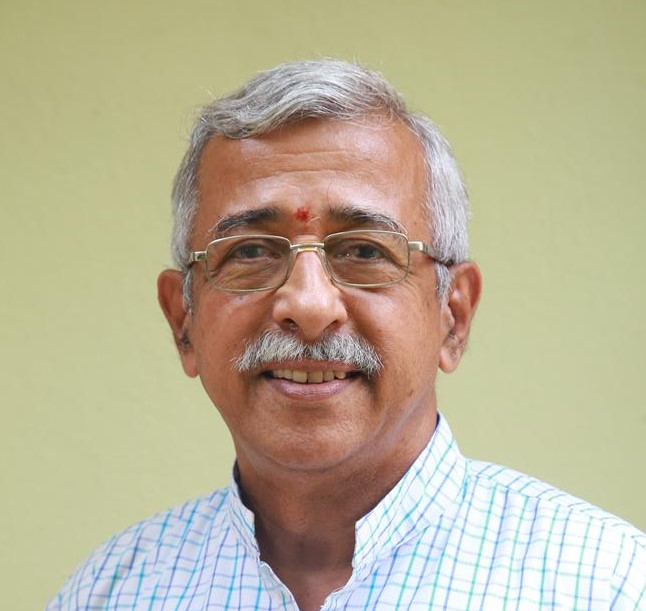
- Born: 23 January 1956 (age 70); Kedila, Bantwal taluk, Dakshina Kannada district, Karnataka.
- Citizenship: Indian
- Education: Rashtriya Sanskrit Vidyapeetha, Tirupati
- Occupation: Sanskrit language activist.
- Years active: 1981–present
- Known for: Revival of Sanskrit
- Title: Co-Founder & former General Secretary of Samskrita Bharati; Trustee secretary of Samskrit Promotion Foundation
- Movement: Speak Samskritam Movement (1981)
- Board member of: Chairman, High Powered Committee for the Promotion of Indian Languages, Ministry of Education (India), Government of India, Member of Constitution of Mission High Level committee (MHLC) of Indian Knowledge System (IKS).
- Spouse: Sarita Shastry
- Children: Chamu Shiva Shastry
- Father: Chamu Ishwara Shastry
- Awards: Padmashri (2017)

Chamu Krishna Shastry (born 23 January 1956) is an Indian educationist who has been working for the revival of the Sanskrit language. He is the trustee and Secretary of Samskrit Promotion Foundation. Shastry is also the co-founder of Samskrita Bharati, an organization that promotes teaching Sanskrit as a contemporary language. On the 25 of January 2017, he was the Delhi recipient of the Padma Shri award, for his contributions towards Literature and Education.

== Early life ==
Shastry was born on the 23 of January, 1956 in Kedila village near Mangalore (Bantwal taluk). He learnt Sanskrit while studying at Rashtriya Sanskrit Vidyapeetha in Tirupati. As a teenager, he was imprisoned during the Emergency due to his affiliation with the RSS. He credits the reading he did during this time with helping him develop the view that knowing Sanskrit can allow one to gain access to scientific, mathematical, and medical knowledge from ancient texts.

== Career ==
=== Speak Samskrit movement ===
Krishna Shastry and some of his friends started the ‘Speak Samskrit’ Movement in 1981 in Bangalore. This experience would inform his method of teaching Sanskrit by exposure instead of translation. Shastry's methods focus less on grammar and more on practical, spoken Sanskrit. Shastry's mission was to use Sanskrit as a means of lessening social barriers; the free courses coupled with lessons in plain speech were to be a more egalitarian way of teaching Sanskrit, by making it easier for non- or semi-literate citizens to learn the language.

=== Samskrita Bharati ===
The movement eventually evolved into the not-for-profit organisation Samskrita Bharati, which is committed to reviving Sanskrit. Shastry helped develop curriculum for the organization's goals including a "Ten Day Sanskrit Speaking Course." Samskrita Bharati has taught the 10 day course for free with the help of 250 full-time workers and 5,000 Sanskrit Bharati volunteers.

The organization is heavily invested in what has been described as "domestic Sanskrit," or the attempt to reframe the language's status and use the home as a method of reproducing Sanskrit. Samskrita Bharati claims to have taught nearly ten million people to converse in Sanskrit, and claims that 6,000 of those people have begun speaking it domestically. Despite these claims, the success of their programs do not appear to have entirely clear outcomes, as census data on Sanskrit speakers wildly fluctuates and evidence for Sanskrit households is often anecdotal or sensationalized.

In the US, SAFL (Samskrit as a Foreign Language) is an ACSWSC accredited program that can be taken for highschool language credits. Samskrita Bharati is active in India and abroad in 13 countries including USA, Canada, UK and the UAE.

"Saraswati Seva" is a project through which books in other languages are translated into Sanskrit. To promote young authors and modern books in Sanskrit he has organised events such as "Samskrit Book Fair" and "Sahityotsava".

=== Samskrit Promotion Foundation ===
Krishna Shastry helped found the Samskrit Promotion Foundation, an institution for developing Sanskrit tutorials for students. It also has a commitment to producing various new course materials for "Sanskrit for Special Purposes" a not for profit trust, that aims to "popularise Samskrit" in India. Among other objectives, it claims to leverage Samskrit as an "effective tool" to socially and economically "empower the weaker sections" of society. The trustees include eminent citizens like former Chief Justice of India R. C. Lahoti, for Chief Election Commissioner N. Gopalaswami, Justice Rama Jois, S. Gurumurthy, among others. Shastry is a key trustee and secretary of this trust.

=== Views ===
Shastry envisions Sanskrit as a future India's lingua franca. In his opinion, Sanskrit could be a unifying factor in an India divided by linguistic and ethnic barriers. He believes that modern subjects should also be taught with Sanskrit, stating: "Till now Samskrit has only been seen from a spiritual or religious perspective; it is high time Samskrit is approached from a scientific point of view as well."

Shastry believes that the "Western educational system" is biased against Sanskrit.

=== Influence on Policy ===
He was a member of the Central Government constituted Sanskrit Committee that developed the "Road Map for the Development of Sanskrit – Ten Year Perspective Plan" document in 2016.

Shastry was a language adviser for the Human Resource Development Ministry during Smriti Irani's term. Shastry was later appointed as the Chairman of the Committee for the Promotion of Indian Languages, or Bharatiya Bhasha Samiti, in 2021. Although he had been appointed in an honorary capacity and had no resume or CV to show, the Ministry of Education began paying him 250,000 rupees a month, or roughly 3000 USD.

=== Others ===
His experience in education has led to his promotion to the Board of Rashtriya Sanskrit Sansthan and other universities.

== Books ==
Shastry is also a writer, having authored 13 books and some articles in the Sanskrit language.

- Savdhana Syaam ISBN 978-8187276487
- Utthistatha Ma Svapthaha (Get up! Don't Sleep!!) ISBN 8188220469
- Parishkaaraha (Essays in Sanskrit) ISBN 8188220493

== Awards ==
- Saraswata Sudhakara in 1984 from Kashi Pandit Parishat
- Rashtriya Yuva Puraskar in 1985 from ABVP
- Padma Shri Award in 2017
