= Rajbir Singh =

Indian academic

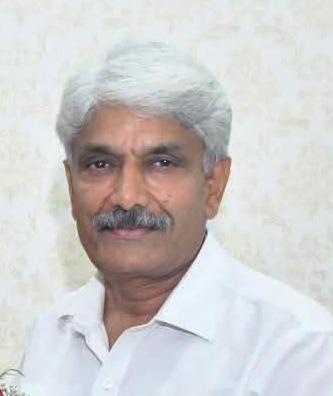
- Professor Rajbir Singh in 2025

Vice-Chancellor of Maharshi Dayanand University
- Incumbent
- Assumed office 21 February 2020
- Preceded by: Bijender Kumar Punia

Vice-Chancellor of Maharishi Valmiki Sanskrit University
- Incumbent
- Assumed office 5 April 2025
- Preceded by: Ramesh Bhardwaj

Officiating Vice-Chancellor of Maharshi Dayanand University
- In office 7 January 2019 – 20 February 2020

Vice-Chancellor of Dada Lakhmi Chand State University of Performing and Visual Arts
- In office 1 March 2018 – 20 February 2020

Director of the Consortium for Educational Communication
- In office 29 November 2012 – 29 December 2017

Personal details
- Born: Rajbir Singh Lohan; 17 July 1964 (age 62) India
- Spouse: Sharanjit Kaur
- Children: 2
- Education: Kurukshetra University
- Occupation: Vice-Chancellor, professor
- Profession: Academic, educator, administrator
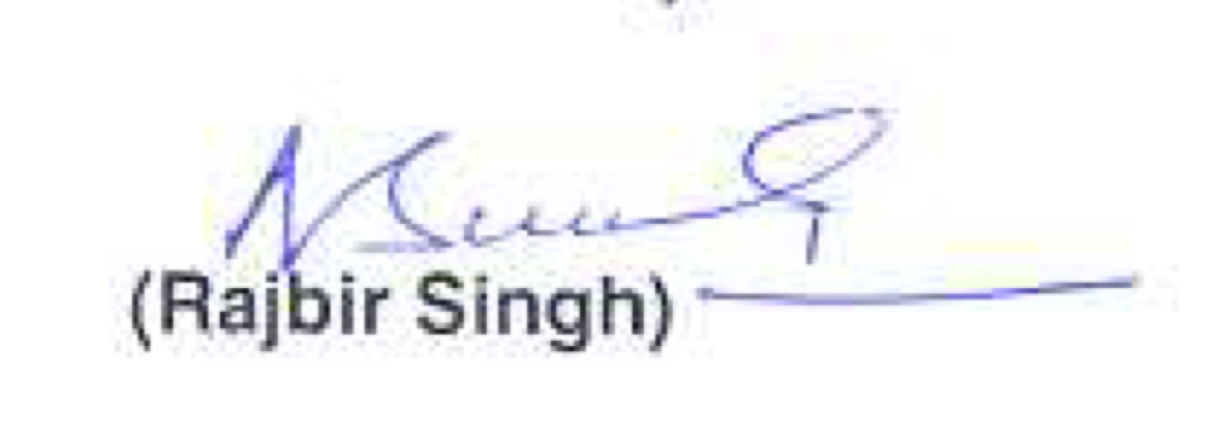
- Signature

Rajbir Singh Lohan (born 17 July 1964) is an Indian academic and the Ex-Vice-Chancellor of Maharshi Dayanand University (MDU), Rohtak, Haryana, and Maharishi Valmiki Sanskrit University (MVSU), Kaithal, Haryana.

He previously served as the Vice-Chancellor of Dada Lakhmi Chand State University of Performing and Visual Arts and Director of the Consortium for Educational Communication (CEC) in New Delhi. During his tenure at MDU, he has overseen academic reforms, international student enrollment, and social outreach initiatives.

== Career ==
From 29 November 2012 to 29 December 2017, Rajbir Singh served as the Director of the Consortium for Educational Communication (CEC), New Delhi, an Inter-University Centre (IUC) under the University Grants Commission (UGC).

From 1 March 2018 to 20 February 2020, he served as the Vice-Chancellor of Dada Lakhmi Chand State University of Performing and Visual Arts .

On 7 January 2019, Singh became the officiating Vice-Chancellor of Maharshi Dayanand University (MDU), a public university in Rohtak, Haryana. He was appointed as the regular Vice-Chancellor on 21 February 2020.

On 21 February 2023, his term was extended for three years by Bandaru Dattatraya, the Governor of Haryana and Chancellor of MDU .

During the tenure of Singh, Maharshi Dayanand University (MDU) received an A+ grade from the National Assessment and Accreditation Council (NAAC) in 2019. From the year 2019 to 2023, the university was ranked among the top 100 universities in India under the National Institutional Ranking Framework (NIRF) conducted by the Ministry of Education, Government of India. MDU also maintained the highest position among universities in the state of Haryana during this period.

The Department of Pharmacology at Maharshi Dayanand University (MDU) was ranked among the top 50 pharmacology institutes in India. Additionally, in the NIRF Rankings 2024, MDU secured the 35th position among state universities nationwide.

In 2025, Singh met with Haryana Chief Minister Nayab Singh Saini to discuss MDU’s academic achievements, research initiatives, and social outreach programs.

Under his leadership, MDU enrolled over 100 international students in 2025, and implemented social connect initiatives involving more than 200,000 students and 5,000 staff members in campaigns like Anaemia Mukt and Nasha Mukt Ghar (drug-free homes).

A social connect mobile application was developed, scheduled for launch by the Chief Minister of Haryana.

In June 2025, Singh announced plans to introduce courses on the Indian traditional knowledge system, highlighting its cultural and practical value during a meeting with department heads.

On 5 April 2025, Singh was appointed as the Vice Chancellor of Maharshi Valmiki Sanskrit University in addition to his MDU role.

== Personal life ==
Prof. Rajbir Singh is married to Dr. Sharanjit Kaur. The couple has two children, a son named Samarveer Singh and a daughter named Padma Jaya.

== In popular culture ==
In 2025, Bengali film director Pavel has selected Rajbir Singh for a documentary film.
