= Veeranarayana Pandurangi =

Sanskrit scholar

Veeranarayana N. K. Pandurangi (Sanskrit: वीरनारायणः एन् के पाण्डुरङ्गी, born 4 July 1973) is a Sanskrit scholar from Bangalore, worked in Jaipur, Rajasthan and at present he is the Principal of Karnataka Samskrit University's evening college. He was awarded the Maharshi Badrayan Vyas Award for Sanskrit by Pratibha Patil, the then President of India, for the year 2011. He is currently Professor and the Dean at the Department of Darshana, at the Jagadguru Ramanadacharya Rajasthan Sanskrit University, Jaipur. Pandurangi is a specialist in Darshan (Hindu philosophy).

== Life ==
Pandurangi studied under the scholars Manikya Shastri and Martanda Dikshit. He holds the Vidvan degree in Navya Nyaya and Dvaita Vedanta, and a Vidvanmadhyama degree in Purva Mīmāṃsā. He has a Master of Arts degree in Sahitya. He has two Vidyavaridhi (PhD) degrees - one in Dvaita Vedanta from Rashtriya Sanskrit Sansthan (New Delhi), and one in Navya Nyaya from Rashtriya Sanskrit Vidyapeetha, Tirupati.

From 1995 to 1999, he served as a lecturer of Navya Nyaya at the Poornaprajna Vidyapeetha Sanskrita College, Bangalore. From 1999 to 2005, he was a researcher at the French Institute of Pondicherry, Pondicherry. From 2005, he has been an associate professor in the Department of Darshana at the Jagadguru Ramanandacharya Rajasthan Sanskrit University, Jaipur. From 2007, he has been the Dean of the Department of Darshana at the university. At present he is the Director of Research and P G Studies at Karnataka Samskrit University, Bangalore.

== Major works ==
Pandurangi has authored and edited eight books and more than 20 papers. Some of his books are:

=== Critiques ===
- Samavāyavimarśaḥ (Sanskrit: समवायविमर्शः. 2006). A critique of Samavāya, a category in the Vaisheshika philosophy. With Panduranga Vitthala. Published by Poornaprajna Vidyapeetha, Bangalore.
- Brahmasūtrabhāṣye Padabhedavicāraḥ (Sanskrit: ब्रह्मसूत्रभाष्ये पदभेदविचारः, 2003). A discussion on different readings of the Brahma Sutra. Published by Poornaprajna Vidyapeetha, Bangalore.

=== Translations ===
- Sadācārasmṛtiḥ (Hindi: सदाचारस्मृतिः, 2011). Hindi translation. Published by Madhvatattvajna Prachar Pratishtan, Prayag.
- Kṛṣṇāmṛtamahārṇavaḥ (Hindi: कृष्णामृतमहार्णवः, 2011). Hindi translation. Published by Madhvatattvajna Prachar Pratishtan, Prayag.

=== Critical editions ===
- Nyāyasudhā (Sanskrit: न्यायसुधा, 2005). Critical edition with an annotated translation into Kannada. Published by Vidyadhisha Seva Pratishthana, Bangalore.
- Tātparyacandrikā (Sanskrit: तात्पर्यचन्द्रिका, 2006). Critical edition with five commentaries. With R. G. Malagi. Published by Rashtriya Sanskrit Vidyapeetha, Tirupati.
- Muktitattvam (Sanskrit: मुक्तितत्त्वम्). (2003) Annotated critical edition. Published by Poornaprajna Vidyapeetha Sanskrit College, Bangalore.
- Tarkanavanītam (Sanskrit: तर्कनवनीतम्). With Shrinivas Varakhedi. Published by Poornaprajna Vidyapeeth, Bangalore.
- Śaktivādaḥ (शक्तिवादः) of Gadadhara Bhattacharya. With Shrinivas Varakhedi. Published by Sanskrit Academy, Osmania University, Hyderabad. ISBN 978-93-80171-05-0.
