= Bijender Kumar Punia =

Former Vice-Chancellor of Maharshi Dayanand University

B. K. Punia

Vice-Chancellor Maharshi Dayanand University
- In office 7 January 2016 – 7 January 2019
- Preceded by: Har Sarup Chahal
- Succeeded by: Rajbir Singh

Personal details
- Children: 2
- Education: Kurukshetra University, Kurukshetra
- Occupation: Professor, Vice-Chancellor
- Profession: Teaching, Administration

Bijender Kumar Punia is the former Vice-Chancellor of Maharshi Dayanand University. He was appointed in 2016. Previously he was working in Guru Jambheshwar University of Science and Technology, Hisar as Professor in Department of Management. He has written many books and on Haryana the Scholars such as Muni Lal, Murli Chand Sharma, HA Phadke and Sukhdev Singh Chib believe that the name comes from a compound of the words Hari (Sanskrit Harit, "green") and Aranya (forest).
