= Faculty of Sanskrit Vidya Dharma Vigyan, Banaras Hindu University =

Sanskrit Vidya Dharma Vijnan
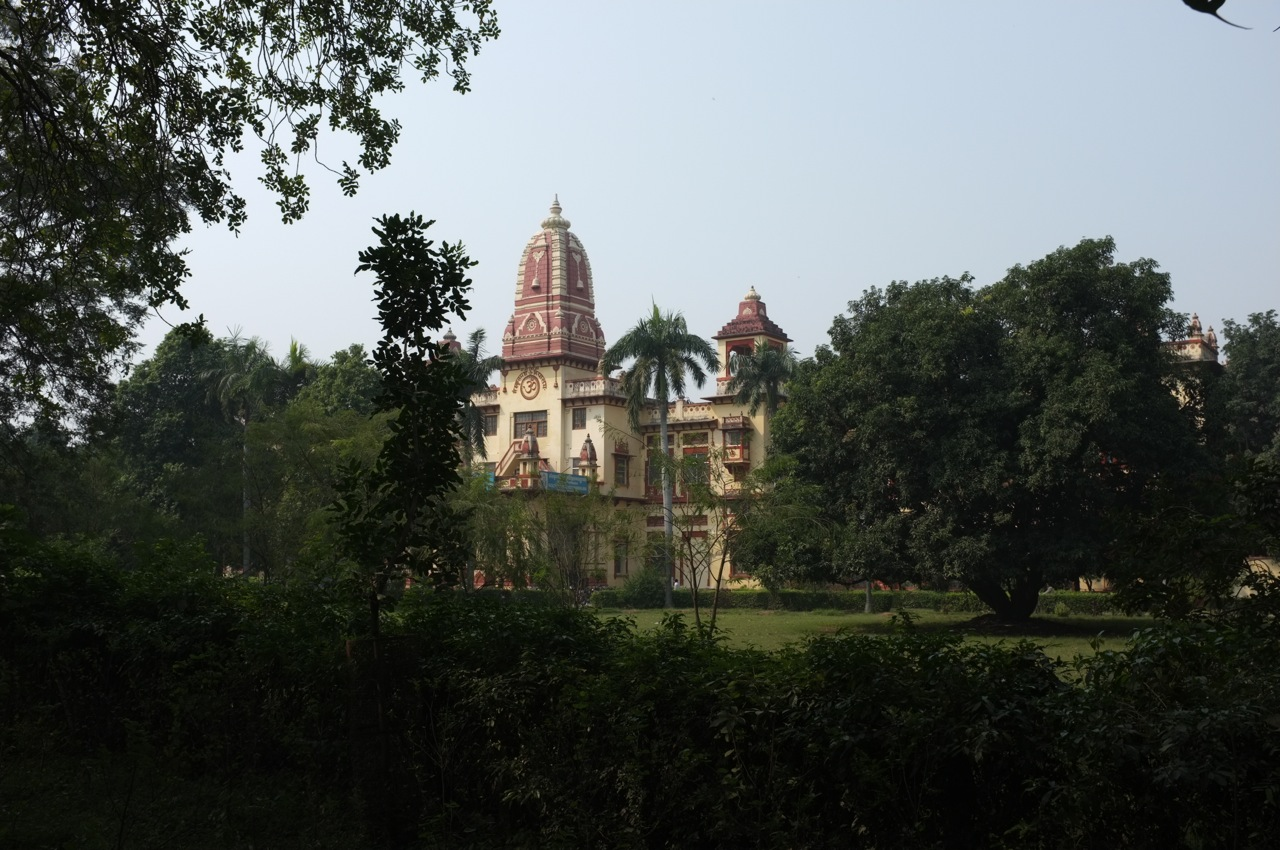
- Faculty of SVDV
- Type: Faculty
- Established: 1918; 108 years ago
- Parent institution: Banaras Hindu University
- Affiliations: UGC
- Dean: Raja Ram Shukla
- Location: Varanasi, Uttar Pradesh, India; 25°16′04″N 82°59′29″E
- Campus: Urban
- Website: Official website
- Faculty location on Varanasi district map

Faculty of Sanskrit Vidya Dharma Vijnan is a faculty of Banaras Hindu University (BHU) in the city of Varanasi in India. The Faculty of Sanskrit Vidya Dharma Vijnan, also called SVDV, or the Faculty of SVDV, offers bachelor's, master's and doctoral degrees in the studies of ancient Indian Shastra, Sanskrit language and Sanskrit literature. It was founded by Mahamana Pandit Madan Mohan Malviya in 1918.

== History ==
The Faculty of Sanskrit Vidya Dharma Vijnan was established in 1918 by Mahamana Pandit Madan Mohan Malviya with the aim of preserving and promoting the studies of ancient Indian Shastra, Sanskrit language and Sanskrit literature. One of the objectives of this faculty was to remove the misconceptions about religion, spirituality, astrology and tantras from society. This is the only faculty or educational establishment of its kind in the world.

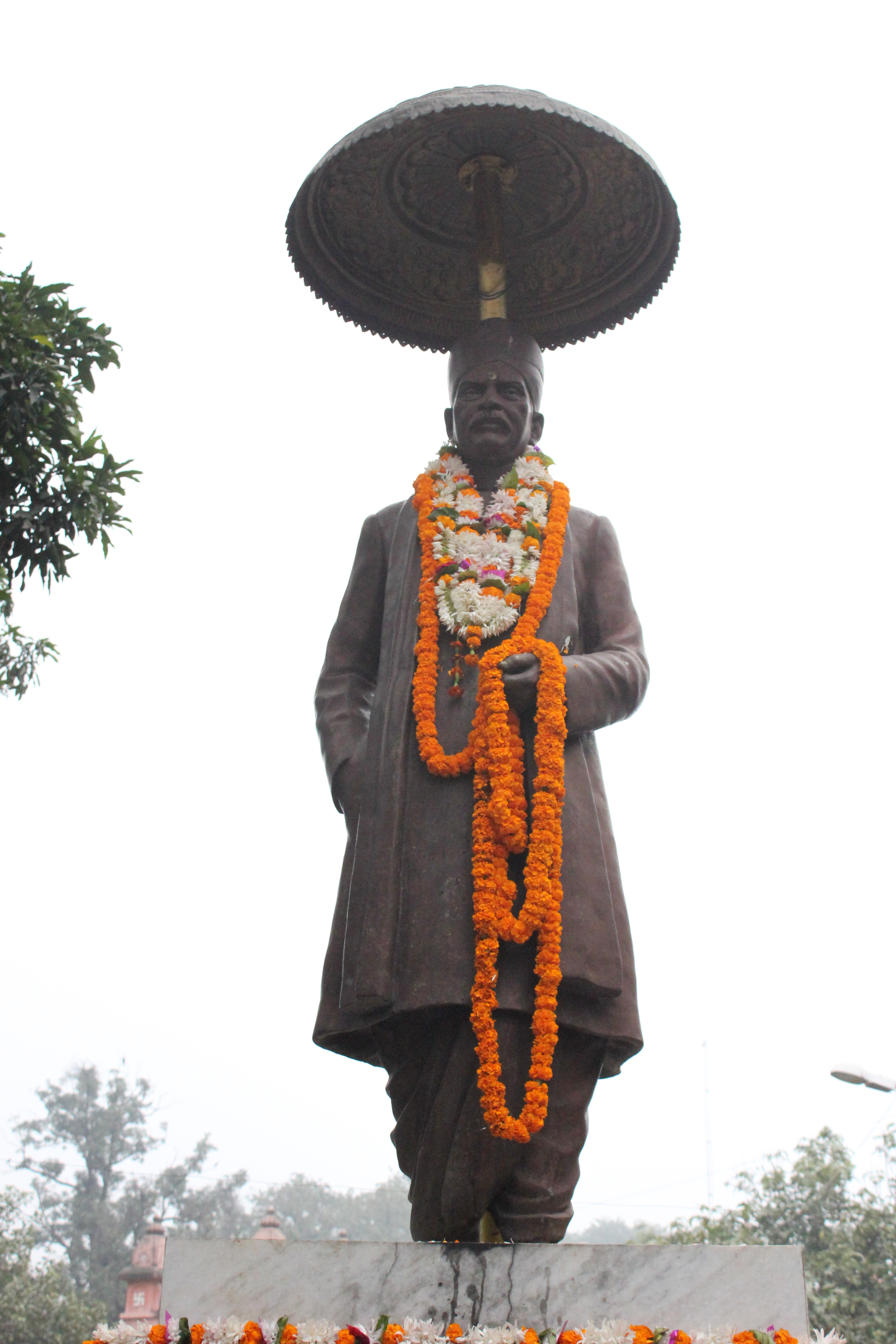
Statue of Mahamana Pandit Madan Mohan Malviya

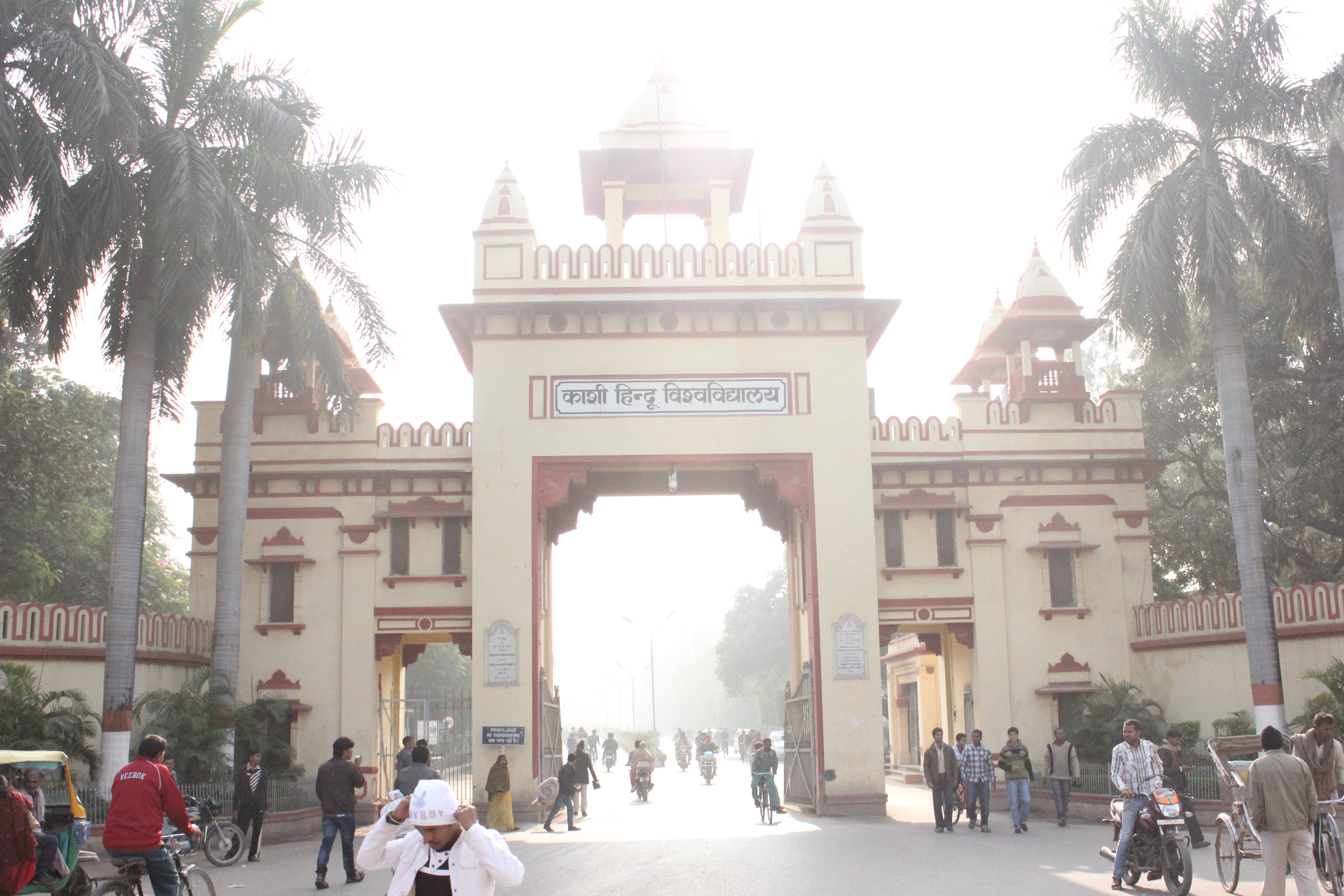
Entrance gate of BHU

== Departments ==
The faculty has eight departments, through which all courses are imparted.

- Dharmagam
- Dharmshastra-Mimansa
- Jain-Buddha Darshan
- Jyotish
- Sahitya
- Vaidic Darshan
- Veda
- Vyakaran

== See also ==
- List of Sanskrit universities in India
- Sanskrit revival
- List of educational institutions in Varanasi
