= Shrinivasa Varakhedi =

Indian academic

Shrinivasa Varakhedi is an Indian Sanskrit scholar, academic and education administrator who is currently serving as the Vice Chancellor of Central Sanskrit University, New Delhi. Formerly, he also served as VC of Kavikulaguru Kalidas Sanskrit University and as Acting VC of Karnataka Samskrit University, Bangalore and Gondwana University, Gadchiroli. Varakhedi has been awarded the Maharshi Badarayan Vyas Samman by the President of India for contributions in interdisciplinary research.

== Career ==
After taking a post-graduate Vidwaduttama degree in Navya Nyaya at the Poornaprajna Vidyapeetha in Bengaluru, which he passed with a 1st rank, he joined the Language Technology Research Center, Indian Institute of Information Technology, Hyderabad, in 1998 as a researcher.

He went on to become an Assistant Professor of Navya Nyaya at Poornaprajna Vidyapeetham, and later on to teach computational linguistics at the Rashtriya Samskrit Vidyapeetha in Tirupati. He worked as Director in Sanskrit Academy, Osmania University, Hyderabad from Feb 2007 to 2011. Later he served as Director of Karnataka State Sanskrit Education till 2013. He was then appointed as Professor in the faculty of shashtras in Karnataka Samskrit University. He served as Dean, Director of PG studies and Research, Registrar in charge in the same university.

He did his PhD Vidyavaridhi at the Rashtriya Sanskrit Sansthan in representing Navy Nyaya in modern technology schemes, under the guidance of Prof. Haridasa Bhat.

== Research areas & publications ==
He has published in the areas of computational linguistics, Sanskrit literature, darshana shastra. Some of them are :

English

- The Path of Proofs - Pramanapaddhati of Sri Jayatirtha, 2011. ISBN 9788192275901

== Honours & Distinctions ==
- Created the structure to the newly set up Directorate for Sanskrit Education in Karnataka State during 2010 - 2011
- Member of the committee for the Vision & Roadmap for the development of Sanskrit, Ministry of HRD, Government of India.
- He is conferred with many distinctions like Honorary D Litt from Various universities in india. Vaakpati honouris Causa from Buddhist University Saranath, Hon DLitt from JRRSU Jaipur, Vachaspati from Uattarakhand Sanskrit University Haridwar, DLitt from KKSU, Nagpur.
