= Maharishi Valmiki Sanskrit University =

University in Haryana, India

Maharshi Valmiki Sanskrit University
- Other name: MVSU
- Type: Public
- Established: 27 March 2018; 8 years ago
- Chancellor: Governor of Haryana
- Vice-Chancellor: Rajendra Kumar Anayath
- Location: Kaithal district, Haryana, India; 29.7800782°N 76.4968371°E
- Campus: Mundri
- Website: mvsu.ac.in

Maharshi Valmiki Sanskrit University (MVSU) is a university established in 2018 by the Government of Haryana at Mundri village of Kaithal district of India. It is 12km east of Kaithal, 111km from the state capital Chandigarh and 164km from the NCR New Delhi. The university is named after Valmiki.

== History ==
On 15 March 2018, the bill to establish this university was passed in Haryana Vidhan Sabha. Though the idea for this university was first conceived by the Chief Minister, Manohar Lal Khattar, in 2015. It was established through the Haryana Act No. 20 OF 2018. It is named after the Hindu sage, Valmiki, the celebrated Sanskrit literature author of Ramayana (500 BC to 100 BC), who was contemporary of Rama and revered as Ādi Kavi, the first poet, author of Ramayana, the first epic poem.

Haryana state has over 24 Sanskrit colleges offering education equivalent to bachelor's degree, additionally masters and doctoral level degrees are also offered by the Kurukshetra University and Maharshi Dayanand University.

== The university ==
=== Objectives ===
The university is established as a teaching and affiliating university for research in Sanskrit and its revival, vedas, Indic languages, Indian culture and Indian philosophy.

=== Campus ===
The university currently operates from its temporary campus at BR Ambedkar Government College, Kaithal while its campus is being constructed at Mundri village.

== See also ==
- List of Sanskrit universities in India
- Sanskrit revival
- List of institutions of higher education in Haryana
- List of Sahitya Akademi Award winners for Sanskrit
- Samskrita Bharati
- Mattur
