= Shree Jagannath Sanskrit University =

Public Sanskrit Language University in Odisha, India

- Motto: Satyam Jñānam Anantam (Sanskrit)
- Motto in English: Truth Knowledge Infinitely
- Type: Public
- Established: 1981; 45 years ago
- Chancellor: Governor of Odisha
- Vice-Chancellor: Prabhat Kumar Mohapatra
- Location: Puri, Odisha, India; 19.807582°N 85.861762°E
- Website: www.sjsv.nic.in

Shree Jagannath Sanskrit University, also known as Shri Jagannath Sanskrit Vishwavidyalaya, is a Sanskrit language university located in Puri, Odisha, India.

== About ==
Shree Jagannath Sanskrit University was established as a teaching-cum-affiliating university by the then Chief Minister Prajnana Vachaspati Sj. Janaki Ballabh Patnaik, a scholar of Sanskrit, who laid the foundation on 7 July 1981 at Mouza Balukhand for the promotion, research & higher studies in Sanskrit Language. It is named after Jagannath, a deity in Hinduism. It is the third oldest sanskrit university in India.

== Academics ==
At present the university grants degrees in Undergraduate, Postgraduate, Siksha Shastri (B.Ed), Visisthacharya (M.Phil), Vidyavaridhi (Ph.D) and D.Litts in different fields of studies in Sanskrit language.

== Departments ==
There are at present eight Postgraduate departments and Siksha Shastri (B.Ed.) department. The latter started from the academic session 2012-13.

- Advaita Vedanta
- Dharmashastra
- Jyotirvigyan
- Nyaya
- Sahitya
- Sarvadarshan
- Veda
- Vyakarana
- Siksha Shastri

== Affiliation & Accreditation ==
There are 167 of Sanskrit Higher Secondary Schools (Upashastri) and 138 Sanskrit Degree Colleges (Shastri) of Odisha affiliated to this institution out of them 94 have been brought under the fold of Permanent Affiliation. NAAC Peer Team assessed the university in the last week of July 2016 and accredited it with B+ Grade.

== Facilities ==
- Central Library
- Health Centre
- Gents Hostel
- Ladies Hostel
- Guest House
- Computer Application Centre
- Centre of Advanced Research in Sanskrit (CARS)
- Publication wing for journal Shree Jagannatha Jyotih, News Bulletin Shreevihara-Bharati and other research works.
- Career Counseling Cell
- Study Centre for Odisha State Open University
- NET Coaching provision for university Students
- Civil Service Coaching Centre
- NSS Wing
- Manuscript Resource Centre (MRC) in collaboration with National Mission for Manuscripts, Ministry of Culture, Government of India.

== See also ==
- List of Sanskrit universities in India
- List of institutions of higher education in Odisha
- Sanskrit revival
