= Maharishi Sandipani Rashtriya Ved Vidya Pratishthan =

Organisation to promote Vedic studies

Maharshi Sandipani Rashtriya Veda Vidya Pratishthan, Ujjain
- Type: Central government administered affiliating authority
- Established: 1987
- Affiliations: Ministry of Education
- Location: Ujjain, Madhya Pradesh, India; 23.1319998°N 75.7371491°E
- Website: msrvvp.ac.in

Maharshi Sandipani Rashtriya Veda Vidya Pratishthan (MSRVVP), under the Ministry of Education, for the preservation, conservation and development of Vedic Studies by establishing and supporting Veda Pathshalas. It has around 450 institutes across India where students spend seven years memorising the Vedas as well as studying subjects like Sanskrit, English, Maths and Social Science. MSRVVP also runs the Maharshi Sandipani Rashtriya Veda Sanskrit Shiksha Board (MSRVSSB), a national-level school education board which grants the Veda Bhushan (10th) and Veda Vibhushan (12th) certificates recognised by the AIU and AICTE.

== History ==
It was established in 1987 at Delhi under then Education Minister, P. V. Narasimha Rao, and it was moved to Ujjain in Madhya Pradesh in 1993.

== Vedic Education ==
Institutes under MSRVVP appoint professors and associate professors of Vedic studies from recognised universities.

== Vedic & Sanskrit Education Board: Maharshi Sandipani Rashtriya Veda Sanskrit Shiksha Board (MSRVSSB) ==
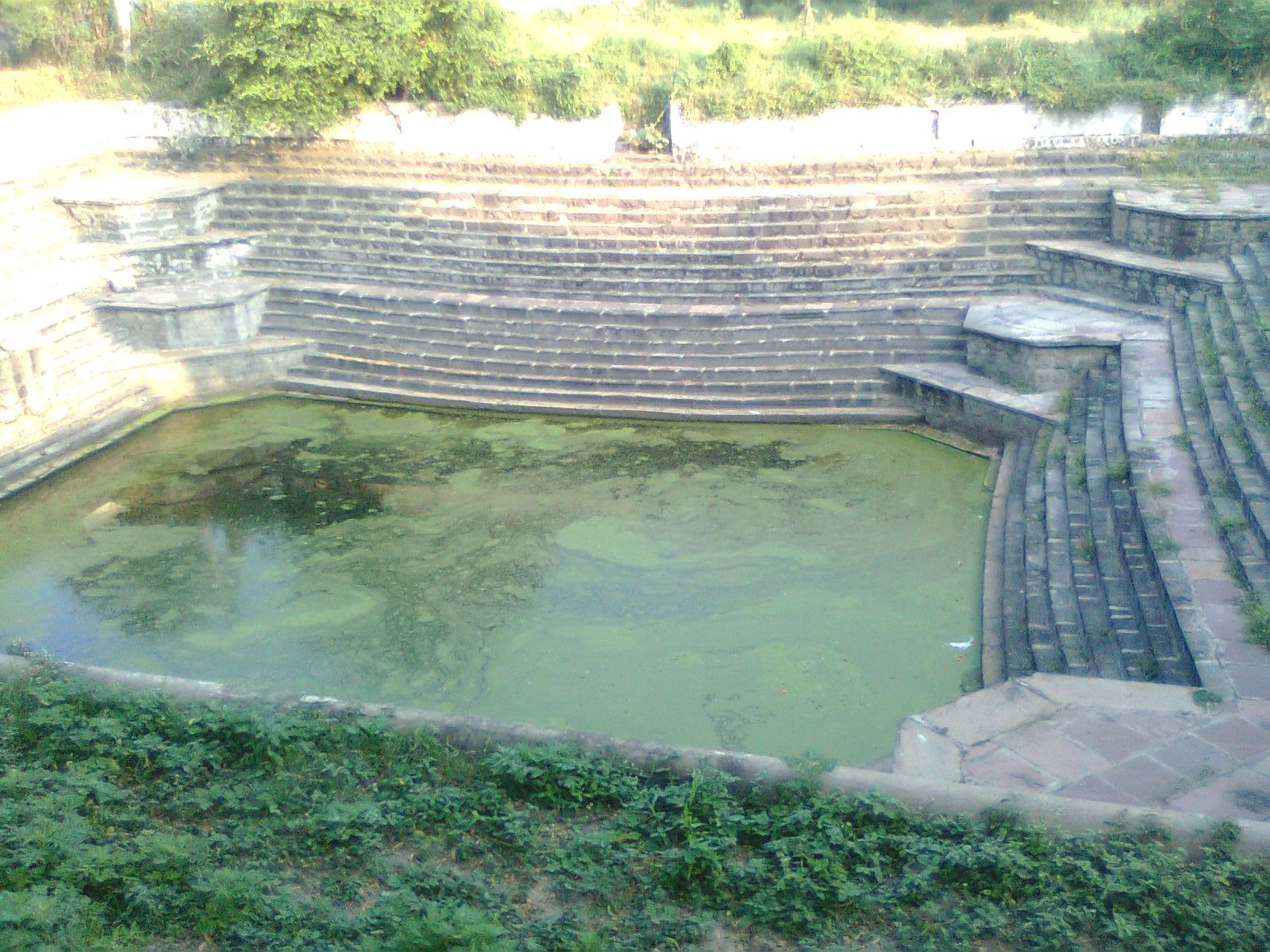
Kund at Maharshi Sandipani Ashram at Ujjain

Maharshi Sandipani Rashtriya Veda Sanskrit Shiksha Board (MSRVSSB), which literally means the Saint Sandipani National Vedic Sanskrit Education Board, is a national-level school education board which grants the Veda Bhushan (10th) and Veda Vibhushan (12th) certificates. Along with the modern subjects, students are also taught Hindu scriptures, vedas, upnishads, ayurveda and sanskrit. MSRVSSB is run by the Maharshi Sandipani Rashtriya Ved Vidya Pratisthan (MSRVVP), which already runs several vedic schools. Govt of India has granted legal authority to MSRVSSB to affiliate and recognise vedic and sanskrit schools run by other organisations. Since August 2022, Association of Indian Universities (AIU) & AICTE (All India Council for Technical Education) formally recognise the 10th and 12th certificates from MSRVSSB as equivalent to those issued by other 10th and 12th education boards in India. MSRVSSB is the first dedicated board for Vedic education and sanskrit education in India, and Prime Minister Narendra Modi's government is credited with making this happen.

In August 2022, MSRVSSB was granted recognition and equivalence by AIU), after which year 10 and year 12 completion certificate from the MSRVSB are equally recognised the qualification for admission into other tertiary institution for a higher degree. In September 2022, AICTE (All India Council for Technical Education), India's regulatory body for the accreditation of technical and engineering education, also issued instruction to all the institutes affiliation with AICTE to recognize the MSRVSSB 10th & 12th certificates as eligible for admission into technical courses.

Earlier in 2016, based on the recommendation of Sanskrit experts and representatives of gurukuls and ved pathshalas, HRD Minister Smriti Irani had announced that there are plans to set up nation's first Vedic Education Board along the lines of CBSE under MSRVVP for teaching Vedas and Sanskrit along with modern subjects. Rashtriya Swayamsevak Sangh (RSS) and Bharatiya Shikshan Mandal had been pushing for the streamlining of nearly 5,000 gurukuls in the nation by creating an interchangeable system for enabling gurukul students to move to formal schooling, though some people have advocated it to a voluntary registration because the uniformity of curriculum would deprive gurukuls of their individual way of teaching. The idea was originally mooted by Baba Ramdev, who offered to set up the private vedic education board under his organisation, which was rejected by the government.

== Controversies ==
In March 2026, a video circulated online showing a hostel warden and teacher at the institution allegedly physically and verbally assaulting a student with a cane. Press reports identified the staff member as Dattadas Shevde and said the student was questioned for allegedly sleeping on another student's bed.

The Times of India reported that police opened a preliminary probe into the incident and that an FIR was registered against Shevde under Sections 115 and 296 of the Bharatiya Nyaya Sanhita and Section 75 of the Juvenile Justice Act.

== See also ==
- List of Modern Sanskrit universities
- Revival of Sanskrit education by states
- Sanskrit education
