= Shri Lal Bahadur Shastri National Sanskrit University =

Central university in Delhi, India

- Other name: SLBSNSU
- Former name: Shri Lal Bahadur Shastri Rashtriya Sanskrit Vidyapeetha
- Type: Central university
- Established: 8 October 1962; 64 years ago
- Chancellor: Dr. Hari Gautam
- Vice-Chancellor: Murlimanohar Pathak
- Visitor: President of India
- Location: Delhi, 110016, India; 28.540707°N 77.182274°E
- Campus: Urban
- Website: www.slbsrsv.ac.in

Shri Lal Bahadur Shastri National Sanskrit University, formerly Shri Lal Bahadur Shastri Rashtriya Sanskrit Vidyapeetha, is a central university, located in South Delhi, India.

== History ==
It was established on 8 October 1962, and the University Grants Commission, granted the status of a deemed university to the Vidyapeetha in November 1987. In March 2020, the Indian Parliament passed the Central Sanskrit Universities Act, 2020 to upgrade it to central university status, along with two other universities Central Sanskrit University and National Sanskrit University.

== Academics ==
The university offers B.A., M.A, B.Ed., M.Ed., M.Phil. and Ph.D. courses, in Sanskrit and related subjects.

== See also ==
- List of Sanskrit universities in India
- Sanskrit revival
