= Shree Somnath Sanskrit University =

University in Gujarat, India

- Other name: SSSU
- Motto: पूर्णतागौरवाय
- Type: Public
- Established: 2005; 21 years ago
- Accreditation: NAAC
- Affiliations: UGC
- Academic affiliations: UGC
- Chancellor: Governor of Gujarat
- Vice-Chancellor: Sukanta Kumar Senapati
- Location: Veraval, Gujarat 362266, India
- Campus: Urban
- Website: sssu.ac.in

Shree Somnath Sanskrit University (SSSU) is a public university located in Veraval, Gujarat, India. It was created by the Gujarat Legislative Assembly through the Shree Somnath Sanskrit University Act in 2005 for the research and teaching of sanskrit literature, with objectives to preserve India’s cultural and linguistic heritage. It is accredited A+ by NAAC.

The main campus in Veraval is home to seven departments, or faculties, which, together with 110 affiliated colleges, research institutes, and centers across Gujarat, award nine different degrees, including B.A., M.A., and PhD, in a variety of fields. Shree Somnath Sanskrit University publishes a quarterly research publication, Somajyoti, and organize regular workshops and conferences to promote discourse and research in Sanskrit language and culture.

== History ==
Shree Somnath Sanskrit University, located in Veraval, Gujarat, is the only Sanskrit University in the state of Gujarat. This public university was established in 2005 by the state of Gujarat’s passage of the Shree Somnath Sanskrit University Act for the scientific research and teaching of Sanskrit literature. The university’s objectives include the preservation of India’s cultural and linguistic heritage, promoting the appreciation of this heritage within India, and integrating traditional and contemporary knowledge systems. The Shree Somnath Sanskrit University Act stipulated that the languages and literatures of Prakrit, Magadhi, Ardhamagadhi, and Pali should be considered a part of the broader Sanskrit linguistic heritage that the university should seek to nurture. Moreover, the university’s founding charter specified that to fulfill the mission to integrate traditional and contemporary knowledge systems, the university should develop classes exploring the connections between Ayurveda and modern medicine, Vastu śāstra and modern architecture, Arthaśāstra and modern economics and political science, and Vyākaraṇa, and modern grammar and linguistics. The university seeks to promote an ethos emphasizing the attainment of completeness and excellence as embodied by the motto, "Pūrṇatā Gauravāya", literally, wholeness begets excellence, articulated in Sanskrit poet Kalidasa’s famous poem, Meghaduta.

== Academics ==
=== Degree Programs ===
The university blends both traditional and modern forms of Sanskrit education. The languages of instruction are Hindi, Sanskrit, Gujarati, and English for lower-level courses, which gradually transitions to Sanskrit as the sole medium of instruction for higher-level courses. The university confers nine different degrees, including certificate, diploma, B.A., B. Ed., M.A., M. Phil, and Ph.D. The B.A. and M.A. degrees are also known as Shastri and Acharya degrees, respectively.

Academic Degrees offered at Shree Somnath Sanskrit University in 2020
Degree	Subjects	Eligibility	Duration
Ph.D.	Sāhitya, Veda, Purāṇa, Jyotisha, Vāstuśāstra, Paurohitya, Nyaya, Vedānta, and Vyākaraṇa	M.A. in Sanskrit	No fixed duration
M. Phil.	Sāhitya, Veda, Purāṇa, and Vyākaraṇa	M.A. in Sanskrit	2 Years
M.A.	Sāhitya, Veda, Purāṇa, Jyotisha, Vāstuśāstra, Paurohitya, Vedānta, Nyaya, Vyākaraṇa, Sarvadarshan, Dharmaśāstra, and Yoga	Graduation in Sanskrit	2 Years
Postgraduate Diploma in Computer Application	Computer and Compulsory Sanskrit	Graduation in any subject	1 Years
B. Ed.	Sanskrit	Graduation in Sanskrit	2 Year
B.A.	Sāhitya, Veda, Purāṇa, Jyotisha, Vāstuśāstra, Paurohitya, Nyaya, Vedānta, and Vyākaraṇa	12th Standard (in any stream)	3 Years
Postgraduate Diploma	Sanskrit and Hindu Religious Studies	Graduation in any Subject	1 Years
Diploma	Yoga, Temple Management, Vāstuśāstra, Sanskrit Teaching, Jyotisha, Vedic Mathematics, Music, Sanskrit and Hindu Religious Studies	12th Standard (in any stream)	1 Years
Certificate	Yoga, Vedic Mathematics, and Music	10th Standard	6 Months

In the B.A. degree (Shastri), students are required to study: Sanskrit (Vyākaraṇa, Sāhitya, and Darśana), English, Digital Literacy, Hindi or Gujarati, Sociology, Economics, History, and Political Science. In addition, students choose a primary and secondary emphasis from the following: Navya-Vyākaraṇa, Sarvadarśana, Rāmānuja Vedānta, Swāminārāyaṇ Vedānta, Navya-Nyāya, Sāhitya, Purāṇa, Dharmaśāstra, Veda, Jyotiṣa, Vāstuśāstra, and Paurohitya.

In the M.A. degree (Acharya), the following subjects are studied: Sanskrit (study of various texts of religious history and linguistics), three primary textual emphases chosen from within the fields of Navya-Vyākaraṇa, Sarvadarśana, Rāmānuja Vedānta, Swāminārāyaṇ Vedānta, Navya-Nyāya, Sāhitya, Purāṇa, Dharmaśāstra, Veda, Jyotiṣa, Vāstuśāstra, and Paurohitya, and a secondary textual emphasis chosen from Navya-Vyākaraṇa, Sarva-Darśana, Sāhitya, Purāṇa, Dharma-śāstra, Veda, and Jyotiṣa.

The university offers a PhD in the following fields of study: Sāhitya, Veda, Purāṇa, Jyotiṣa, Vāstu-śāstra, Paurohitya, Nyāya, Vedānta, and Vyākaraṇa. The university is developing plans to offer a M.Ed. degree and open a College of Ayurveda in collaboration with other institutions.

=== Academic Departments ===
Shree Somnath Sanskrit University has seven main academic departments, or faculties, in which the following courses and degrees are offered. In its Veraval campus during the 2019-2020 academic year, under the leadership of Vice-Chancellor Dr. Gopabandhu Mishra, 50 faculty and staff taught approximately 318 students.

In 2020, the academic departments at the Veraval campus were:

- Faculty of Ved and Vedanga (Vedas and Auxiliary Disciplines)
- Faculty of Sāhitya (Literature)
- Faculty of Vyākaraṇa (Grammar and Linguistics)
- Faculty of Vijnan and Abhinav Vidya (Science and Innovation)
- Faculty of Purāṇa (Ancient Sanskrit Texts)
- Faculty of Darśana (Theology)
- Faculty of Shiksha Shastri (Education)

=== Academic Exchange Programs ===
In 2019, Shree Somnath Sanskrit University signed a memorandum of understanding (MoU) with Heidelberg University, Wurzburg University, and Leipzig University—three German universities that have a long tradition of Sanskrit scholarship. The MoU specifies that the universities will foster academic exchange of cultural and religious studies, Sanskrit, and other South Asian languages between faculty and students.

== Campuses ==
=== Veraval campus ===
The Veraval Campus is the main branch of Shree Somnath Sanskrit University.

==== Student facilities ====
SSSU provides free lodging and boarding to all its students. The campus also has a gymnasium and a large area for indoor and outdoor recreation.

==== Library ====
The SSSU library, called Sharada Bhavan, was established in 2007. The Triveni Reference Library, a reading room, was inaugurated in October 2013. The library houses approximately 22,000 books and 25 serial publications. The library is open to students, faculty, non-teaching staff, affiliated colleges, and daily visitors.

=== Affiliated Colleges and Centers ===
The university also offers various degree, diploma, and certificate courses across a number of campuses in Gujarat. The courses include temple management, paurohitya, jyotisha, vastu śāstra, yoga, spoken Sanskrit, and a post-graduate diploma in computer applications. These courses are conducted through academic affiliation with 110 colleges, universities and research institutes across Gujarat. These include:

- Tattvagnan Mandir Research Institute in Modasa
- Akshardham Centre for Applied Research in Social Harmony in Gandhinagar
- Santshri Sandhyagiribapu Sanskrit Pathshala in Jamnagar
- Shri Bhagwat Vidyapith Trust Shiksha-Shastri (B.Ed.) College in Ahmedabad
- Shri Brahmarshi Sanskrit Mahavidyalaya in Nadiad
- Shri Darśanam Sanskrit Mahavidyalaya in Ahmedabad
- Shri Jhanvi Sanskrit Mahavidyalaya in Amreli
- Shri Muktanand Sanskrit Mahavidyalaya in Magod
- Shri Narayan Sanskrit Mahavidyalaya in Petlad
- BAPS Swaminārāyaṇ Sanskrit Mahavidyalaya in Sarangpur
- N. S. Patel Arts College in Anand

== Research activities ==
=== Publications ===
Somajyoti is a quarterly publication created by the University to share news about the academic and cultural events of the University. The publication includes articles in Sanskrit, Hindi, and English. The chief editor in 2020 was Gopabandhu Mishra.

=== Conferences ===
Shree Somnath Sanskrit University frequently organizes local, state-level, national, and international conferences to promote scholarship on Sanskrit language and literature by faculty and other eminent scholars.

The "Traditions of Commentary and the Dynamics of Knowledge" international conference was held in February 2020. The conference included papers in Hindi, Sanskrit, and English on topics covering the definition and interpretation of commentaries as well as digital methods and standards for analyzing Sanskrit texts.

The university organizes an annual conference on Sanskrit grammar to discuss new research on specific texts from within the university’s curriculum. In the September 2018 conference, participants discussed selections from the Laghu-śabdendu-śekhara, a Sanskrit text by Nagesh Bhatt (18th Century) commenting on the aphorisms of the Ashṭādhyāyī, the seminal text of Paninian Grammar containing approximately 4000 aphorisms. The conference featured ten presentations, each of which elaborated on an aphorism from a section of the text along with the sajñā-prakaraṇa of the Ashṭādhyāyī.

In May 2018, SSSU organized the All India Oriental Conference, which has been a national forum for scholars interested in Indological studies since 1918. The conference brought together scholars of Vedic studies and Classical Sanskrit, along with scholars of Iranian, Islamic, Arabic, and Persian studies.

In September 2017, a national conference was hosted by SSSU entitled the "Vaidika-sangoṣti" (‘Conference on the Vedas’). The three-day conference featured presentations focused on the methods of Vedic rituals and ceremonies. The research conducted by the presenters was compiled into a book published following the conference.

From January 20 to January 22, 2016, SSSU organized a conference entitled Darśana-Saṅkāya whose purpose was to promote and discuss new research on traditional Hindu scriptures. Bhadreshdas Swami, the author of the Swaminārāyaṇ Vedānta commentaries on the Prasthānatrayī, gave one of the presentations, which featured a line-by-line discussion of the section on inference in the tarkasaṃgraha (a Navya-Nyāya text). Dr. Janakisharan Acharya, Assistant Professor of Sanskrit at SSSU, presented on the Adhyāsa Bhaṣya of Shankara (8th Century). Shrutiprakashdas Swami, director of the Akshardham Center for Applied Research in Social Harmony, presented on the differences and similarities between Ramanuja and Swaminārāyaṇ’s theologies. Other presentations focused on elucidating various sections of the tarkasaṃgraha and the Swaminārāyaṇa-Brahmasūtra-Bhaṣyam.

=== Workshops ===
SSSU also organizes regular workshops in order to inspire students, faculty, and other scholars to inquire more deeply into their research areas and broaden their interests

In January 2019, a five-day workshop was held that focused on various discussions within the field of Jyotiṣa. Approximately 35 scholars of Jyotiṣa, along with many students, attended the workshop. Scholars from several Indian institutions participated, including authorities in Jyotiṣa studies like Vinay Kumar Pandey of the Banaras Hindu University and Devendranath Pandey of SSSU.

In August 2017, a workshop entitled "alaṅkāra-nirṇaya" (or ‘Discussion on the Aesthetic Qualities of Poetry) was organized, in which about 25 students participated. The workshop featured sessions on how rhetorical elements are used in Sanskrit belles-lettres and texts that elucidate the aesthetic qualities of poetry. To increase students’ familiarity with how Sanskrit poets have employed figurative language and rhetorical elements, excerpts of their works were discussed.

In July 2017, the university organized a workshop on English speaking and writing, as a part of its broader mission to ensure that students gain a comprehensive education, becoming proficient in languages and skills in addition to Sanskrit. The workshop involved interactive sessions on English grammar, speaking, and writing.

=== Honorary Degrees ===
In 2018, SSSU conferred upon Viveksagar Swami of the Bochasanwasi Shri Akshar Purushottam Swaminarayan Sanstha a D.Litt for his contributions to Hindu philosophy.

On October 28, 2017, Arknath Chaudhary, Vice-Chancellor of SSSU, awarded Bhadreshdas Swami of the Bochasanwasi Shri Akshar Purushottam Swaminarayan Sanstha the title Abhinava-Bhāskara, in recognition of his contribution to the Indian dārśanika tradition: namely, reviving interest in the Sanskrit language and inspiring a new lineage of scholars, by composing a set of commentaries on the Prasthānatrayī.

=== Cultural and Social Impact ===
==== Cultural Activities ====
At the university, students participate in activities such as cultural programs, youth festivals, and Annual Day celebrations. The university’s annual youth festival is called Yuvak Mahotsava, and includes various literary, cultural, and sports activities. The university also organizes a "Day of Yoga" yearly. The university also hosts competitions for its students, such as elocution competitions and shloka-chanting competitions, along with organizing conventions for the learning of spoken Sanskrit. In adherence to Vedic tradition, yajna is performed daily in the university’s yajnashala.

The university annually hosts a Sanskrit-Saptahotsava (a seven-day Sanskrit festival). As a part of the festival, various competitions are organized. In the 2015 Sanskrit-Saptahotsava, 255 students took part in competitions involving essay-writing, delivering speeches, singing, teaching, and storytelling. The purpose of these competitions, SSSU states, is to inspire students to learn Sanskrit, and to increase students’ awareness of how Sanskrit studies may enrich their studies within other fields.

==== Social Impact ====
In 2011, the university allocated 22.5 lakh rupees towards teaching the knowledge of Hindu priesthood rituals to students from Dalit and tribal families. At least 80 such students subsequently enrolled in a 3-year diploma course of priesthood. The diploma includes the study of the Vedas, Vedant, Sāhitya, dharma śāstras, Nyāya, jyotish, shikshā, Vyākaraṇa, mimamsa, darshan, vastu, Purāṇa, English, and computer science. This first cohort graduated in 2015.

SSSU also organizes projects contributing to the planting of trees, public health, and sanitation, and voting awareness.

== See also ==
- List of Sanskrit universities in India
- Sanskrit revival
