= Karnataka Samskrit University =

State University in Karnataka

Coordinates: 12.9592°N 77.5723°E

- Motto: प्रज्वालितो ज्ञानमयः प्रदीपः
- Type: Public
- Established: 2010; 16 years ago
- Affiliations: UGC
- Chancellor: Governor of Karnataka
- Vice-Chancellor: S. Ahalya
- Location: Bengaluru, Karnataka, India
- Campus: Urban
- Website: ksu.ac.in

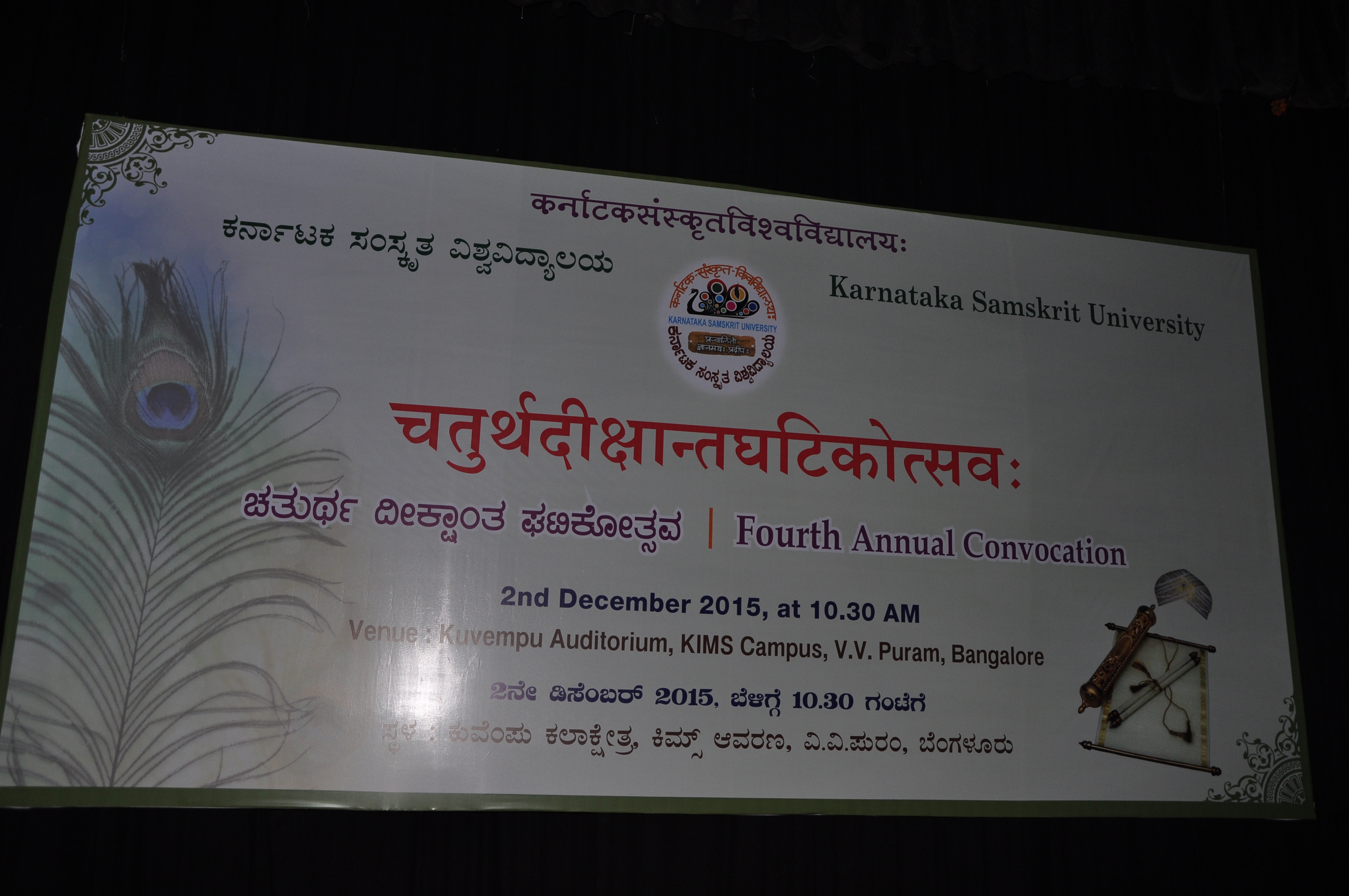
KSU 4th Convocation Stage Banner

Karnataka Samskrit University is a university in Bangalore, Karnataka. Its aim is the development and research in Sanskrit language.

== History ==
The university was established in 2010 by the Karnataka Government. Karnataka Samskrit University has been formed exclusively for the development of Sanskrit language. Sanskrit has a hoary, scientific, literary, cultural tradition and heritage.

The university was established in 2010 by the Karnataka Government. There are 31 Sanskrit colleges in Karnataka. There are also 243 aided Veda and Sanskrit Pathashalas spread over the state. Directorate of Sanskrit education is established by the Government of Karnataka to administer the Sanskrit pathashalas.

Karnataka Samskrit University has predominantly four wings. They are

1. Teaching Wing 2. Research Wing 3. Publication Wing 4. Administrative Wing

One Hundred acres of land has been identified for the University in Kuduru Hobli, Magadi Taluk, Ramanagar District. The university currently includes 2 constituent Sanskrit Colleges, 10 aided affiliated colleges and 9 unaided affiliated colleges under its ambit. It has established the Directorate of Sanskrit Education, to take care of Pre-university education in Karnataka. The directorate includes 354 recognised Sanskrita pathashalas throughout the state.

== Notable faculty ==
- Veeranarayana Pandurangi

== See also ==
- List of Sanskrit universities in India
- Sanskrit revival

== Official site ==
- Official website
