= Mundri =

- village
- Location in Haryana, India Mundri (India)
- Coordinates: 29.7800782°N 76.4968371°E
- Country: India
- State: Haryana
- District: Kaithal

Languages
  - Official: Hindi
- Time zone: UTC+5:30 (IST)
- Postal code: 136042
- Telephone code: +91-01746-XXXXXX
- Vehicle registration: HR-08
- Website: haryana.gov.in

Mundri is a village in Kaithal tehsil of Kaithal district of Haryana in India. Mundri village is famous for Luv Kush Teerth located here.

== Education ==
Maharishi Valmiki Sanskrit University was established at Mundri in 2018 by the Government of Haryana, through a legislative bill passed in Haryana Vidhan Sabha. It is named after the Hindu sage, Balmiki, the celebrated Sanskrit literature author of Ramayana (500 BC to 100 BC), who was contemporary of Rama and revered as Ādi Kavi, the first poet, author of Ramayana, the first epic poem. Haryana state has over Dayanand Brahm Mahavidyala, Hisar Sanskrit education in Haryana that 24 Sanskrit colleges offering education equivalent to bachelor's degree, additionally masters and doctoral level degrees are also offered by the Kurukshetra University and Maharshi Dayanand University.

== See also ==
- NIILM University
