= Har Sarup Chahal =

Former Vice Chancellor of Maharshi Dayanand University

Engineer Har Sarup Chahal is the former Vice Chancellor of Maharshi Dayanand University, Rohtak, beginning May 2013. From 2008 to 2013, he was Vice Chancellor of Deenbandhu University of Science and Technology, Murthal.

== Early life ==
Chahal was born on 6 May 1949 in Bhiwani, Haryana. He completed his schooling at Jat Heroes Memorial School, Rohtak. Chahal's father was a headmaster at Jat School and Vaish School in Rohtak. He graduated in Civil Engineering and obtained a postgraduate diploma in Highway Engineering from the Punjab Engineering College, Chandigarh.

== Career ==
Chahal was initially selected as a lecturer in Regional Engineering. College, Kurukshetra (now National Institute of Technology, Kurukshetra), but later joined Haryana Irrigation Department for a short spell. He made his career in Haryana Public Works Department (Buildings & Roads), where he rose from an assistant engineer to the rank of engineer-in-chief. He also served as a managing director of Haryana State Roads & Bridges Development Corporation and general manager in National Highways Authority of India.

In his career as an engineer spanning 37 years, he completed many projects for Haryana PWD, Delhi Development Authority and National Highways Authority of India in the States of West Bengal, Jharkhand, Rajasthan, Haryana and Andhra Pradesh.

He was a council member and vice president of Indian Roads Congress. In addition, he is a member of Rigid Pavement Committee and Highway Planning, Transportation and Road Safety Committee of Indian Roads Congress. He is also a fellow of the Institution of Engineers (India) and is on the boards of directors of WARCO's (Ministry of Water Resources. G.O.I.). He is credited with authoring many technical papers on road safety in Indian and foreign journals.
