= Rajendra Kumar Anayath =

Indian researcher

- Born: Thiruvegapura, Kerala, India
- Occupations: Professor, Vice Chancellor, Researcher, Academic, Consultant

Rajendra Kumar Anayath (born; Thiruvegapura, Kerala, India) is an Indian researcher, educationist and consultant with more than three decades of experience in result-oriented research, consulting and training in the global graphic arts industry. Anayath served two terms consecutively, totalling six years, as vice chancellor of Deenbandhu Chhotu Ram University of Science and Technology & ten months as Vice-Chancellor of BPS Mahila University, located in Haryana.
