= List of Buddhist colleges and universities in Nepal =

The following Buddhist colleges and universities operate in Nepal.

- Lumbini Buddhist University, Siddharthanagar, Nepal
- Rangjung Yeshe Institute, Seto Gompa Marg, Boudhanath, Kathmandu
- Kagyu Institute of Buddhist Studies, Dev Doka, Kirtipur, Kathmandu
- Kathmandu University, Dhulikhel, Nepal
- Benchen Monastery, Swayambhu, Nepal
- Chhairo gompa, Mustang
- Thrangu Tashi Yangtse Monastery, Namo Buddha, Kavre
- Nagarjuna Institute, (also famous for Newari Buddhists and Hindu Buddhists)
