= Samskrita Bharati =

Pan-Indian language

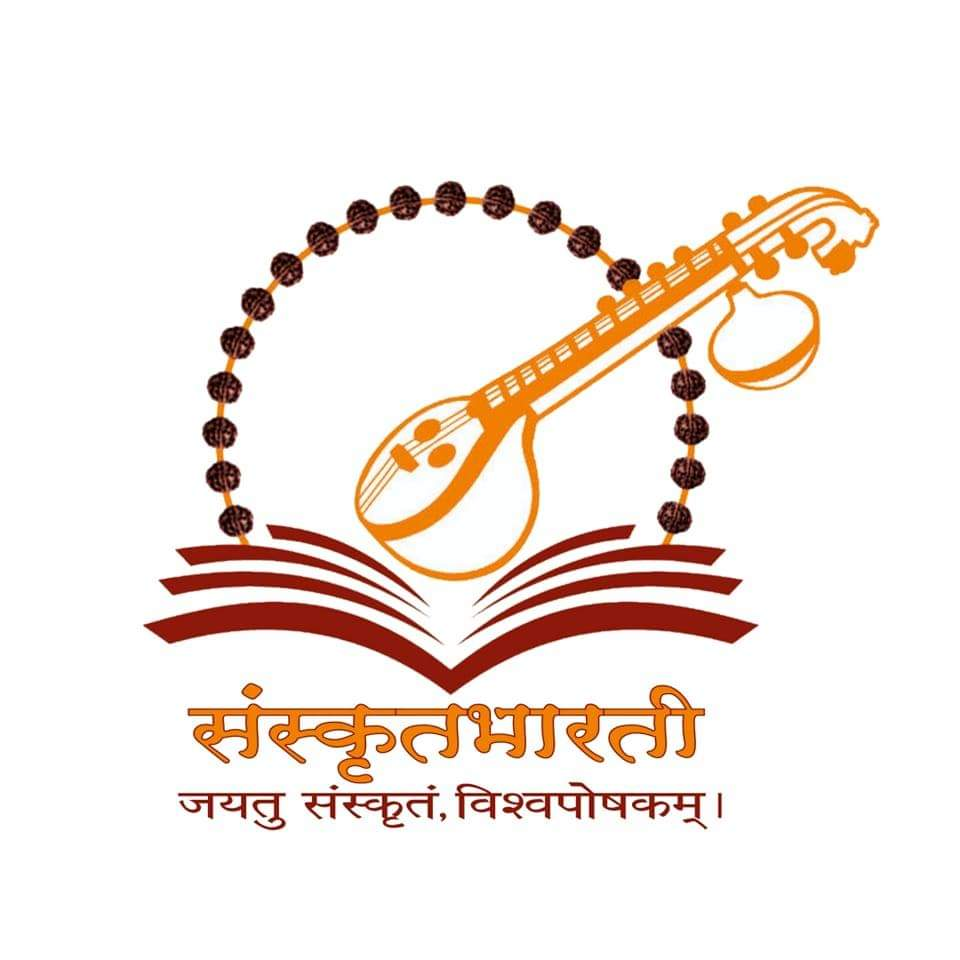
- Founded: 1981 (45 years ago)
- Headquarters: 25 Deen Dayal Upadhyaya Marg; New Delhi, India
- Officers: Gopabandhu Mishra (President); Shrinivasa Varkharedi (Vice President); Satyanarayana Bhat (General Secretary); Dinesh Kamath (Org. Secretary); P. Nandakumar (Secretary)
- Website: samskritabharati.in

Samskrita Bharati (Sanskrit: संस्कृतभारती, romanized: Saṃskṛtabhāratī, pronounced [sɐm̩skɻ̩tɐ bʱaːɾɐtiː]) is a non-profit organisation working to revive Sanskrit. Sanskrit was a pan-Indian language in the Vedic and classical period but lost its place to its derivative regional dialects in modern India. According to their own figures, repeated often in their promotional literature, by 2025, they trained over 10 million people to speak Sanskrit through 120,000 sambhashana shivir (conversation camps). Just about 25 years ago, in 1998, 2.9 million people had already attended the conversation camps. They have helped shape over 6000 'Sanskrit homes' where all members of the family speak in Sanskrit, and the mother tongue (native language) of the children is Sanskrit.

Samskrita Bharati, founded in 1981, has its headquarters in New Delhi, and has local offices at the various state capitals within India, district headquarters and grass root local level offices.

== Mission and motivations ==
The basic mission of this organisation is to democratise and popularise Sanskrit by encouraging the use of simple Sanskrit in everyday conversational contexts. More recently, the organisation has started to focus on the maintenance of the "mother-tongue-ness" (Sanskrit: मातृभाषात्वम्, romanized: mātṛbhāṣātvam) of Sanskrit by means of Sanskrit households. Additionally, the primary impetus is on direct Sanskrit language instruction through Sanskrit itself as the medium of instruction.

=== Motivation ===
As its founder says, "Sanskrit is the best tool to remove the five types of social differences; linguistic, class, caste, sect and the north vs south division." A basic goal is to create a nation of Sanskrit speakers, (re)creating a national unity for India through common linguistic practice.

Another one of the main premises of the movement is to allow direct access to the vast storehouse of the Sanskrit textual tradition.

== Pedagogical principles ==
The organisation's pedagogical philosophy is based on the idea that listening and speaking must precede reading and writing. Rejecting both Western-style grammatical instruction (or more recent innovations) and Indian traditions of Sanskrit instruction emphasising systematic memorisation, Samskrita Bharati instead has focused its energies on immersion through conversation. A common aphorism used in their literature is: "Speak in Samskrit, not about Samskrit."

This follows a theory of linguistic practice which imagines a progression from the capacity for "general communication" (simple reference and predication), through the capacity for expressing thought or reasoning (logical argumentation), culminating in the capacity for the outward manifestation of emotions.

=== Simple Sanskrit Usage ===
To provide a gentler introduction to Sanskrit, Samskrita Bharati has developed a simple and effective method of Sanskrit instruction through Sanskrit. Initial instruction is on simple use of the language, which while conforming to Panini's grammar, focuses on the use of very regular forms for conversational purposes at initial stages. As Dr Hastings observes:

the "simple" of simple Sanskrit points to the fact that it is designed to act as a bridge between the modern vernacular(s) a simple Sanskrit learner already knows and, ideally, acquisition of the fully-elaborated Classical Sanskrit grammar... "simple Sanskrit" is a variety of the language which has been subjected to what we could call distributional simplification. That is, almost all of the differences between simple Sanskrit and Classical Sanskrit are differences in the distribution of forms rather than grammatical".

This form of simple use of language exists and is practised in several languages in India. A news anchor, or a stage speaker, might for instance, construct sentences using advanced grammatical or literary phrases. These advanced constructions are found widely in literature, however, not required for day-to-day communication, and can be acquired and understood overtime. (Note that this is NOT the difference between colloquial and formal language). Simple use of Sanskrit is very much formal and grammatically accurate.

== Work ==
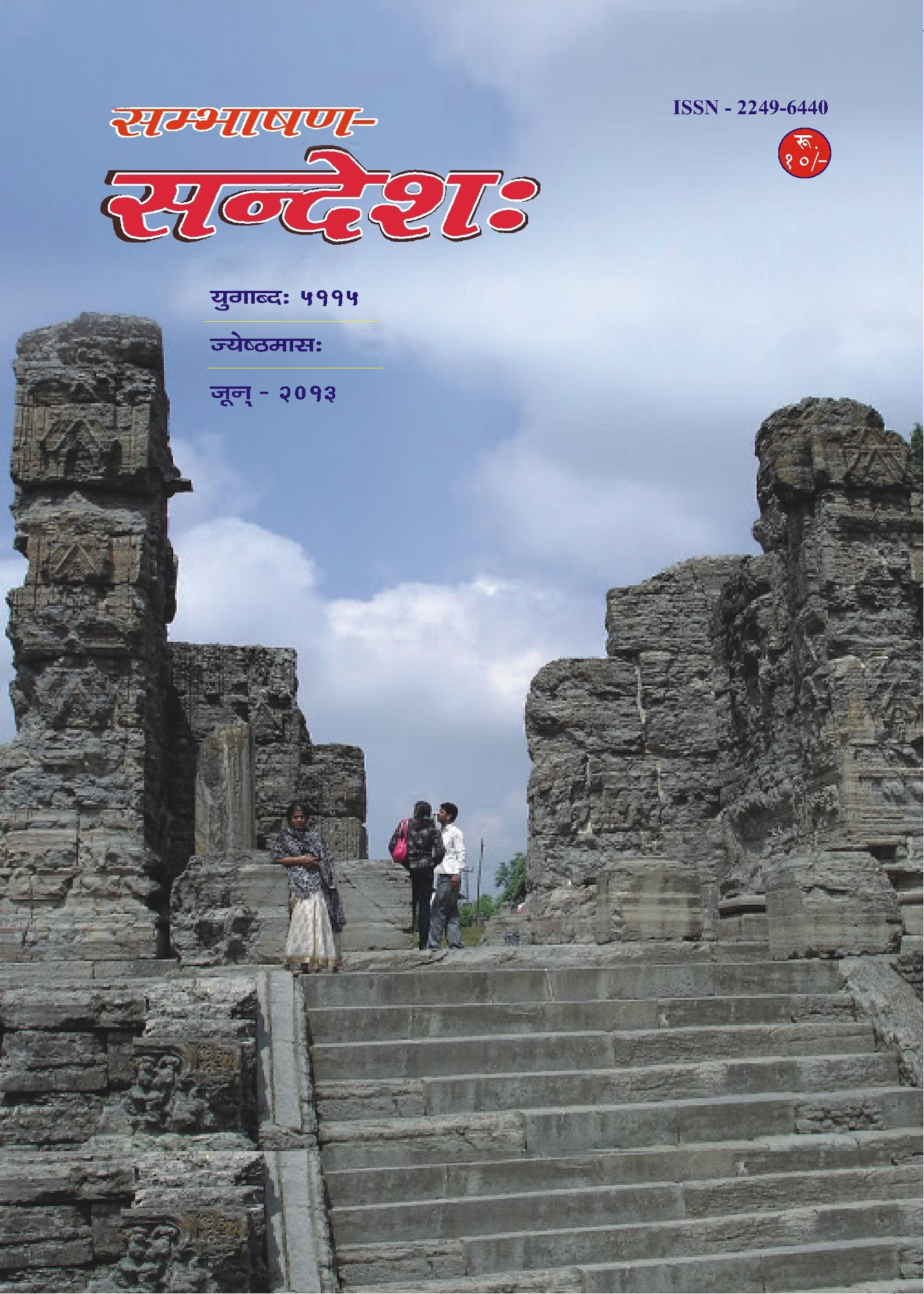
Sambhāṣaṇa Sandeśaḥ – the organisation's official Sanskrit magazine

Samskrita Bharati is primarily a volunteer-driven organisation, with volunteers from all walks of life spending time educating people to speak Sanskrit. Their most popular offering is the 10-day capsule of two-hour classes designed to impart simple Sanskrit conversational skills.

Besides this, the organisation conducts the following programmes:

- A two-week intense residential teaching programme called Saṃvādaśālā (Sanskrit: संवादशाला), is conducted in New Delhi, India every summer.
- Weekend camps and yearly residential camps as well in many parts of the US and India.
- Development and publication of Simple Sanskrit books, tapes and CDs for learning practical conversations in Sanskrit at various levels are developed systematically to allow new speakers to effectively use Sanskrit for conversations.
- Publication of the Sambhāṣaṇa Sandeśaḥ magazine.
- Distance learning programmes or dūrasthaśikṣaṇam (दूरस्थशिक्षणम्).
- Sanskrit as a foreign language programme for children in USA.
- Competitions to encourage Sanskrit learning amongst children.

=== Effectiveness ===
Even as he acknowledges that "end of the ten days, the participants have a reasonable command of many basic features of (simple) Sanskrit and can formulate a wide variety of expressions.", Hastings notes:

While the Sanskrit conversation camps have garnered a great degree of public visibility for the Sanskrit revival movement, they have not generated as large and dedicated a following as Samskrita Bharati would hope. The organisation has a host of follow-up activities for graduates of the introductory ten-day camps, but there is a substantial attrition rate after initial exposure in the camps.

== Origin ==
Chamu Krishna Shastry, a Sanskrit scholar from Tirupati Sanskrit College along with five of his colleagues, after graduating in Sanskrit, came up with a methodology of teaching spoken Sanskrit through the "Speak Samskritam" (called a Sambhāṣaṇa Śibiram) course with ten-day capsule classes of two hours duration. Within a short span of time, this methodology became a trailblazer in the field of teaching Sanskrit. This "Speak Samskritam" Movement took off in 1981 from Bangalore city, and later "Samskrita Bharati"—a national level organisation—was established in New Delhi in 1995.

== See also ==
- Sanskrit revival
