= Sri Venkateswara Vedic University =

State university in Andhra Pradesh, India

- Type: Public
- Established: 2006; 20 years ago
- Affiliations: UGC, TTD
- Chancellor: Governor of Andhra Pradesh
- Vice-Chancellor: Rani Sadasiva Murty
- Location: Tirupati, Andhra Pradesh, India
- Website: www.svvedicuniversity.ac.in

Sri Venkateswara Vedic University is a state university located at Tirupati, Andhra Pradesh, India. It was established in 2006 by the Government of Andhra Pradesh, sponsored by the Tirumala Tirupati Devasthanams (TTD), and focuses on Vedic studies.

== History ==
Sri Venkateswara Vedic University establishment follows a decision taken by the Tirumala Tirupati Devasthanams (TTD) board in 1992 to establish a Vedic university at Tirupati. Following Rameshwar Thakur assuming charge as Governor of Andhra Pradesh in January 2006, he started a process which culminated in an Act for the establishment of the university, passed in September 2006.

== Faculties ==
The institute has seven faculties:

- Faculty of Veda Adhyayana
- Faculty of Agama Adhyayana
- Faculty of Paurohitya Adhyayana
- Faculty of Vedabhashya
- Faculty of Vedaangas
- Faculty of Research & Publication
- Faculty of Modern Subjects

== See also ==
- List of Sanskrit universities in India
- Sanskrit revival
