= Sanskrit revival =

Language revival movement in India

Sanskrit revival is the ongoing resurgence of interest in and use of the Sanskrit language in India. Sanskrit is one of the 22 scheduled languages in the Indian Constitution, which gives it official recognition at the federal level. On top of that, in 2010, Uttarakhand became the first state in India to have Sanskrit as its second official language, followed by Himachal Pradesh, in 2019.

There have been numerous efforts to restore Sanskrit to its former prominence, with widespread federal and state-level governmental support for Sanskrit education. With continuing Sanskrit education across Indian schools and universities, and high-demand for learning Sanskrit, the overall (first, second, third language) speakers naturally increases in every census. As of 2025, Samskrita Bharati, one of the most popular and widely-known non-profit Sanskrit learning institutions, reports training over 10 million people through its conversation campus to speak in Sanskrit, and over 135,000 teachers to teach professionally with Sanskrit as medium of instruction in schools and universities. Additionally, they report having set up over 6000 Sanskrit homes, one of their flagship projects, where all members of such families speak in Sanskrit, and the mother tongue (native language) of the children is Sanskrit.

According to the last conducted Indian Census, in 2011, there were 3,122,823 total speakers of Sanskrit (as a first, second, or third language), with 24,821 speakers reporting it as their first language, 1.13 million as a second language, and 1.96 million as a third language. Despite projects such as Sanskrit Bharati's 6000 Sanskrit homes, first-language Sanskrit statistics from the census are widely reported and interpreted simply as a wish to be aligned with the prestige of the language, due to fluctuations in first language speaker counts across decennial censuses.

Sanskrit was added to Google Translate in 2022, as it was the most requested language at that time. Many Western countries such as Germany, the United Kingdom, the United States, European countries, as well as China have also witnessed propagation of Sanskrit.

== History ==
In 1891, there was organized activity among the Theosophists in British India promoting and participating in the revival of Sanskrit. In 1894 the American Asiatic and Sanskrit Revival Society was established.

In India, Sanskrit is included in the 14 original languages of the Eighth Schedule to the Constitution. Many organizations, like the Samskrta Bharati, are conducting Speak Sanskrit workshops to popularize the language. The All-India Sanskrit Festival has been hosting composition contests since 2002.

The state of Uttarakhand became the first state in India to declare Sanskrit as an official language. The Central Board of Secondary Education in India has made Sanskrit a third language in the schools it governs (though it is an option for a school to adopt it or not, the other choice being the state's own official language). In such schools, learning Sanskrit is an option for grades 5 to 8 (Classes V to VIII). This is true of most schools, including but not limited to Christian missionary schools, including those which are affiliated to the ICSE board, especially in those states where the official language is Hindi. An option between Sanskrit and a local language as a second language exists for grades 9 and 10, except in the State of Karnataka, where State government policies mandate Kannada as the compulsory second language.

== Sanskrit revival movements ==
=== Sanskrit literature movement ===
There is a Sanskrit literature movement to revive Sanskrit.

The Indian Council for Cultural Relations (ICCR) has started giving "World Sanskrit Award" to eminent Sanskrit scholars to recognise their outstanding contribution to the study, teaching, research in Sanskrit language and literature. Princess Maha Chakri Sirindhorn of Thailand was conferred the first "World Sanskrit Award" in 2016. In 2017, Robert Goldman was awarded the World Sanskrit Award.

There are also many Sanskrit writers who won Sahitya Akademi Award winners.

=== Global organisations ===
Samskrita Bharati is an organization working for Sanskrit revival. It is a tax exempt nonprofit organization with its headquarters in New Delhi, India. The International Centre, Aksharam, a complex located in Bangalore, India, is its international centre. It houses a research wing, a library, audio-visual lab, and staff quarters. It also has several state-units spread across the country both in the United States and India. The US chapter is a registered nonprofit tax-exempt organization with its headquarters in San Jose, California. Samskrita Bharati functions as an umbrella organization for various organizations working for promotion of Samskrita. Being the liturgical language of Hindus, it is used during worship in Hindu temples in the West. It is taught in many South Asian studies/linguistics departments in universities across the West. Also, Sanskrit revival attempts are underway amongst expatriate Hindu populations in the west. It is also popular amongst the many practitioners of yoga in the West, who find the language useful in understanding the Yoga Sutra.

Bharatiya Vidya Bhavan is an India educational trust. It was founded on 7 November 1938 by K. M. Munshi, with the support of Mahatma Gandhi. The trust programmes through its 119 centres in India, seven centres abroad and 367 constituent institutions. One of its purposes is the promotion of Sanskrit over "all aspects of life from the cradle to the grave and beyond" – thus filling "a growing vacuum in modern life".

=== Modern Sanskrit universities in India ===
In the last few years sporadic efforts have been made to form Sanskrit universities for Sanskrit studies and vyakarana in India. The Sanskrit Universities Bill is aimed at converting Sanskrit deemed to be universities to central universities. The partial list of such universities and colleges is given below in chronological order:

S. No	Year Established	Name	Location	State	Specialization
1	1791	Sampurnanand Sanskrit University	Varanasi	Uttar Pradesh	
2	1824	The Sanskrit College and University	Kolkata	West Bengal	
3	1894	Government Sanskrit College, Baripada	Baripada	Odisha	Traditional Sanskrit education (+2 Upashastri, +3 Shastri), Oldest Sanskrit college of Odisha
4	1906	Madras Sanskrit College	Chennai	Tamil Nadu	
5	1961	Kameshwar Singh Darbhanga Sanskrit University	Darbhanga	Bihar	
6	1962	National Sanskrit University	Tirupati	Andhra Pradesh	
7	1962	Shri Lal Bahadur Shastri Rashtriya Sanskrit Vidyapeetha	New Delhi	Central Govt	
8	1970	Central Sanskrit University (formerly Rashtriya Sanskrit Sansthan)	New Delhi	Central Govt	Multi-campus
9	1981	Shree Jagannath Sanskrit University	Puri	Odisha	
10	1993	Sree Sankaracharya University of Sanskrit	Kalady	Kerala	
11	1997	Kavikulaguru Kalidas Sanskrit University	Ramtek (Nagpur)	Maharashtra	
12	2001	Jagadguru Ramanandacharya Rajasthan Sanskrit University	Jaipur	Rajasthan	
13	2005	Shree Somnath Sanskrit University	Somnath-Veraval, Junagadh	Gujarat	
14	2005	Sri Venkateswara Vedic University	Tirupati	Andhra Pradesh	
15	2008	Maharishi Panini Sanskrit Evam Vedic Vishwavidyalaya	Ujjain	Madhya Pradesh	
16	2018	Maharishi Balmiki Sanskrit University	Kaithal	Haryana	

== Sanskrit revival by states of India ==
=== Vedic and Sanskrit school education board ===
The Maharshi Sandipani Rashtriya Veda Sanskrit Shiksha Board (MSRVSSB) is a national-level school education board which grants the Veda Bhushan (10th) and Veda Vibhushan (12th) certificates to the students of affiliated schools. MSRVSSB certificates are accredited by the Association of Indian Universities (AIU) and AICTE as the recognised qualifications for admission into other tertiary institutions for a higher degree. Along with the modern subjects, the students are also taught Hindu scriptures, vedas, upnishads, ayurveda and Sanskrit.

=== Andhra Pradesh ===
Andhra Pradesh has several dozens Sanskrit institutes, including the Rashtriya Sanskrit Vidyapeeth and Rashtriya Sanskrit Vidyapeeth (deemed university) at Tirupati.

=== Assam and Northeast India ===
Assam and Northeast India, where Sanskrit has reached by the late vedic period, has Kamarupa Anusandhan Samiti which was established in 2012 to research Sanskrit, Ananda Ram Baruah institute of languages publishes Sanskrit manuscripts, and Assam Sanskrit Board is responsible for researching and preserving Sanskrit documents and manuscripts.

=== Bihar ===
Bihar has Sanskrit institutes like Kameshwar Singh Darbhanga Sanskrit University. Bihar Sanskrit Shiksha Board conducts the Annual Secondary School Examination in February/March and the Supplementary School Examination in August/September, following the course/syllabus prescribed by the state government.

=== Delhi ===
Delhi has at Delhi University, Rashtriya Sanskrit Sansthan, Delhi Sanskrit Academy Department and Central Sanskrit University and Shri Lal Bahadur Shastri National Sanskrit University (central university) undertaking research and teaching in Sanskrit.

=== Gujarat ===
Gujarat has Shree Somnath Sanskrit University and 50 Sanskrit pathshalas (schools) of which 38 are officially recognised by the government.

=== Haryana ===
Haryana state has over 24 Sanskrit colleges offering education equivalent to bachelor's degree, additionally masters and doctoral level degrees are also offered by the Kurukshetra University and Maharshi Dayanand University. In 2018, Haryana established Maharishi Balmiki Sanskrit University, Kaithal as a teaching and affiliating university for research in Sanskrit, vedas, Indic languages, Indian culture and Indian philosophy.

=== Himachal Pradesh ===
Himachal Pradesh has many Sanskrit institutes. In 2019 the Himachal Pradesh government decided to make Sanskrit the second official language replacing Punjabi. Also, Himachal Pradesh government has plans to teach Sanskrit as a compulsory language from 3rd to 5th standards. Currently Sanskrit is taught from 5th to 10th standards in the state. The state government has also intended to open a Sanskrit university to revive the language in the state.

=== Kerala ===
Kerala has many Sanskrit institutes, including Sree Sankaracharya University of Sanskrit.

=== Madhya Pradesh ===
Madhya Pradesh has many Sanskrit institutes, including Maharishi Sandipani Rashtriya Ved Vidya Pratishthan and Maharishi Panini Sanskrit Evam Vedic Vishwavidyalaya.

=== Maharashtra ===
Maharashtra has Sanskrit institutes like Kavikulaguru Kalidas Sanskrit University.

=== Odisha ===
Odisha has many Sanskrit institutes, including Shri Jagannath Sanskrit Vishvavidayalaya.

Government Sanskrit College, Baripada, established in 1894, is the oldest Sanskrit college in Odisha and one of the oldest in India. Currently affiliated to Shree Jagannath Sanskrit University, it offers traditional Sanskrit education including Upashastri and Shastri courses, and plays a vital role in preserving classical Sanskrit scholarship in eastern India.

=== Rajasthan ===
Rajasthan has Jagadguru Ramanandacharya Rajasthan Sanskrit University.

=== Tamil Nadu ===
Tamil Nadu has many Sanskrit institutes, including the Madras Sanskrit College established in 1906.

=== Uttar Pradesh ===
Uttar Pradesh has Sampurnanand Sanskrit University.

=== West Bengal ===
West Bengal has at least four universities with Sanskrit departments.

== Revival outside India ==
Over 100 institutes outside India offer academic studies in Sanskrit:

=== South Asia ===
- Bangladesh: Bangladesh Sanskrit and Pali Education Board. Sanskrit Departments of University of Dhaka, University of Rajshahi, University of Chittagong and affiliated colleges under the National University.
- Bhutan: Nalanda Buddhist Institute undertakes teaching of Sanskrit texts.
- Nepal: Nepal Sanskrit University was established in 1986 at Beljhundi in Dang district; several gompas also undertake teaching of Sanskrit texts at the primary and secondary school level. Rangjung Yeshe Institute also offers Sanskrit classes. See also List of Buddhist colleges and universities in Nepal.
- Sri Lanka: several institutes, including over a dozen universities, offer bachelor's, master's and doctoral degrees in Sanskrit.

=== East and Southeast Asia ===
The following nations in the East and Southeast Asia offer opportunities for Sanskrit studies:

- Cambodia: After the fall of Angkor Empire in the 14th century, Buddhist monks started learning Sanskrit from early the 20th century, and academic teaching of Sanskrit in modern universities in Cambodia was recommenced in the 1980s at Preah Sihanouk Raja Buddhist University and several public universities including Royal University of Fine Arts and the Royal University of Phnom Penh. Native Cambodian Indologists like Dr Ms. Kunthea Chhom, who has MA in Sanskrit from Magadh University in India and PhD in Sanskrit epigraphy from École pratique des hautes études in France, are trying to revive the study of Sanskrit among Cambodians.
- China: Beijing University offers Sanskrit courses.
  - Hong Kong: The Center of Buddhist Studies of University of Hong Kong offers Sanskrit courses.
- Indonesia: The Udayana University of Bali established a "Chairs of Indian studies" in 2013 which also offers a Sanskrit course in Denpasar with the help of the Indian government. Several educational institutions in Indonesia have also been teaching Sanskrit and Balinese Hinduism such as the State Hindu College of Tampung Penyang (a state-owned Hindu institute in Central Kalimantan), the Gde Pudja Hindu State Institute in Mataram city, and many more. In 2019, the Bali TV has been conducting Sanskrit lessons for Hindu locals in Bali. Indonesian languages are heavily influenced by Sanskrit and have numerous Sanskrit loanwords, mottoes of institutes and ancient inscriptions.
- Japan: Kyoto University
- Laos: Buddhist studies such as Sanskrit and Pali are usually undertaken at Buddhist monasteries, such as Vientiane Sangha College and Champasak Sangha College.
- Malaysia: See also Sanskrit inscriptions in the Malay world and Sanskrit loanwords in Malay.
- Myanmar: Sanskrit is mandatory at the bachelor's and master's degree level in the State Pariyatti Sasana University, Mandalay and State Pariyatti Sasana University, Yangon.
- Philippines: See also list of Sanskrit loanwords in Tagalog.
- Singapore: Yale-NUS College of National University of Singapore and Yale University and Singapore University of Technology and Design offer Sanskrit studies, Global Indian International School has made NCERT-based Sanskrit a mandatory subject for 1,800 primary school students in Singapore, and Ramakrishna Mission at Bartley Road has been holding weekly Sanskrit classes for over 50 schoolchildren for over 40 years.
- South Korea: Dongguk University offers Buddhist studies including Pali and Sanskrit texts.
- Taiwan: National Taiwan University and Fo Guang University of Fo Guang Shan monastic Buddhist order also offer bachelors, masters and doctoral degrees in Sanskrit.
- Thailand: Hosts the annual World Sanskrit Conference and several universities offer Sanskrit studies at bachelor's, master's and higher degree level such as Silpakorn University, Chulalongkorn University, Mahidol University and many more.
- Vietnam: Under pressure from Buddhist monks, a Khmer Buddhist Studies Institute of Southern Vietnam (called Wicia Stan Butisasana Khmer Vietnam Khang Thhon in Khmer language) was opened in 2007 on 12 ha land of Wat Sanvoar by the government in the Ô Môn District of Cần Thơ province to teach Sanskrit and Buddhist subjects in Khmer language at university level. There are three more Buddhist institutes, one each at Hanoi, Mỹ Sơn and Saigon, in the Vietnamese language. Cham Hindus, also called Balamon Chams, who mostly reside in Bình Thuận Province and Ninh Thuận Province, are practicing Hindus in Vietnam.

=== Africa ===
The following nations in Africa offer opportunities for Sanskrit studies:

- South Africa: St James Preparatory Schools in Cape Town, Durban and Johannesburg offer Sanskrit classes.

=== Americas ===
The following nations in the Americas offer opportunities for Sanskrit studies:

- Brazil: University of São Paulo
- Canada: Concordia University, McGill University, McMaster University, University of British Columbia, University of Calgary, University of Saskatchewan, University of Toronto.
- Mexico: El Colegio de Mexico
- USA: aA of 2007, there are about 36 universities which offer Sanskrit education, including Johns Hopkins University and Harvard University. In the United States, since September 2009, high school students have been able to receive credits as independent study or toward foreign-language requirements by studying Sanskrit, as part of the SAFL: Samskritam as a Foreign Language program coordinated by Samskrita Bharati. The Hindu University of America (HUA) offers several courses in written and spoken Samskritam (Sanskrit) as well as Sanskrit based courses on the Bhagavad Gita, Upanishads and other Sanskrit literature and works.

=== Arabia and Middle East ===
The following nations in the Middle East offer opportunities for Sanskrit studies:

- Israel: Hebrew University of Jerusalem and Tel-Aviv University.
- Oman: Indian School

=== Europe ===
The following nations in Europe offer opportunities for Sanskrit studies, most notably Germany, France, UK, Italy and the Netherlands:

- Austria: University of Vienna offers Sanskrit courses.
- Belgium: Ghent University and Louvain University.
- Denmark: University of Copenhagen
- Finland: University of Helsinki
- France: University of Paris, University of Lyon, University of Lille, University of Provence, and École pratique des hautes études.
- Germany: As of 2015, there are 14 German universities teaching the Sanskrit language. Free University of Berlin, University of Bonn, University of Freiburg, University of Göttingen, Martin Luther University Halle-Wittenberg, University of Hamburg, Heidelberg University, Kiel University, Leipzig University, University of Mainz, Marburg University, LMU Munich, University of Tübingen, and University of Würzburg. Shree Somnath Sanskrit University at Rajkot signed a MoU with three German universities, Heidelberg University, University of Würzburg, and Leipzig University, for student and academic exchange.
- Great Britain: In the UK, there are four universities which teach Sanskrit including University of Oxford, University of Edinburgh, Cambridge University, and London University. SOAS University of London too offers a bachelor's degree in Sanskrit. St James Junior School in London, England, offers Sanskrit as part of the curriculum.
- Italy: University of Bologna, University of Rome, University of Milan, Università Cattolica del Sacro Cuore, University of Venice, University of Bologna, University of Pisa, University of Naples, University of Cagliari, University of Florence, University of Palermo, and University of Turin.
- Netherlands: Groningen University, Leiden University, and Kern Institute. International Institute for Asian Studies.
- Norway: Oslo University.
- Poland: Warsaw University, Jagiellonian University, Adam Mickiewicz University, University of Wrocław, Catholic University of Lublin
- Portugal: University of Lisbon
- Russia: Moscow State University, Saint Petersburg State University
- Spain: University of Salamanca
- Sweden: Stockholm University, and Uppsala University.
- Switzerland: Lausanne University, Zurich University, University of Münster.
- Altindische Grammatik was written by Swiss Indologist Jacob Wackernagel.

=== Oceania ===
The following nations in Oceania offer opportunities for Sanskrit studies:

- Australia: Australian National University, La Trobe University, University of Queensland and University of Sydney (Department of Indian Subcontinental Studies) offer Sanskrit courses. The revival of Sanskrit is also driven by the Australian Indian migrants. In Australia, the Sydney private boys' high school Sydney Grammar School offers Sanskrit from years 7 through to 12, including for the Higher School Certificate. The John Colet School in Sydney, an independent school, has been teaching Sanskrit for 37 years, alongside its sister school, Erasmus, in Melbourne.
- Fiji: Bharat Sevashram Sangha organises Sanskrit lessons for students across several cities. University of Fiji also has the "Department of Hindi Language and Culture".
- New Zealand: Several universities teach Sanskrit, including Massey University, the University of Auckland, and the University of Otago. Ficino School, Mt Eden in Auckland teaches Sanskrit to students to improve English.

== See also ==
- List of Sanskrit-related topics
- Sanskritisation (linguistics)
  - List of English words of Sanskrit origin
  - List of Sanskrit and Persian roots in Hindi
  - List of Indic loanwords in Indonesian
  - List of Sanskrit loanwords in Tagalog
- List of Sanskrit poets
- List of languages by first written account
