= National Sanskrit University =

Central university in Andhra Pradesh, India

- Motto: Tamasoma Jyotirgamaya
- Motto in English: Lead me into light from darkness
- Type: Central university
- Established: 1956; 70 years ago
- Chancellor: N. Gopalaswami, IAS (Retd.)
- Vice-Chancellor: G. S. R. Krishna Murthy
- Visitor: President of India
- Location: Tirupati, Andhra Pradesh, India
- Website: www.nsktu.ac.in

National Sanskrit University, is a central university in Tirupati, Andhra Pradesh, India.

In addition to regular courses at undergraduate (bachelor's) and postgraduate (master's) degree level, the university also offers several distance learning courses. Sahitya, Vyakarana, Advaita Vedanta, Dwaita Vedanta, Phalita Jyotisham, Purana Ithihasa, Yoga Shastra are some subjects in which courses are offered.

== History ==
The school was established in 1956 under Ministry of Education by Government of India to propagate Sanskrit studies, traditional Sastras and Pedagogy.

In considering its achievements and potential for research in Traditional Sastras the university was given the status of Center of Excellence in Traditional Sastras during the X plan period in 1989.

In March 2020, the Indian Parliament passed the Central Sanskrit Universities Act, 2020 to upgrade Rashtriya Samskrita Vidyapeetha, a deemed to be university to a central university as National Sanskrit University, along with two other universities Central Sanskrit University and Shri Lal Bahadur Shastri National Sanskrit University.

== See also ==
- List of Sanskrit universities in India
- Sanskrit revival
- N. S. Ramanuja Tatacharya
