= Central Sanskrit University =

Central university in Delhi, India

- Other name: CSU
- Former name: Rashtriya Sanskrit Sansthan
- Type: Central university
- Established: October 15, 1970; 55 years ago
- Chancellor: Union Minister of Education
- Vice-Chancellor: Shrinivasa Varakhedi
- Visitor: President of India
- Location: Delhi, 110058, India; 28.610598°N 77.103046°E
- Website: www.sanskrit.nic.in

Central Sanskrit University, formerly Rashtriya Sanskrit Sansthan, is a multi-campus Sanskrit language central university headquartered in West Delhi, India. It serves as the central agency for implementing Sanskrit-related policies and schemes of the Government of India, working closely with the Ministry of Education.

== History ==
Appointed by the Government of India, the Sanskrit Commission (1956-1957) recommended funding to private academies to spread the growth and popularity of the Sanskrit language. A Central Sanskrit Board was created to oversee Sanskrit education in the country.

On 15 October 1970, the Rashtriya Sanskrit Sansthan was established under the Societies Registration Act, 1860 to promote the growth of Sanskrit across the country.

In March 2020, the Indian Parliament passed the Central Sanskrit Universities Act, 2020 to upgrade it from deemed to be university status to central university status, along with two other universities Shri Lal Bahadur Shastri National Sanskrit University and National Sanskrit University. On 30 April 2020, the school was renamed as Central Sanskrit University.

The university oversees 12 campuses across India and serves as the primary nodal agency for the Ministry of Education's Sanskrit-related policies.

== Academics ==
This university offers B.A., B.Ed., M.A., M.Ed., Ph.D. programs and a distance learning program in Sanskrit language and literature education. This University is set to launch B.Tech course in A.I. and Data Science, which was highlighted by Prime Minister Narendra Modi in the 135th Mann ki Baat episode. Such initiative encourages cultural and linguistic heritage of India while connecting and growing with new technology.

== Campuses ==
Central Sanskrit University is a multi campus university spread across different parts of India.

- Shri Ranbir Campus, Jammu
- Shri Vedvyas Campus, Balahar
- Shri Raghunath Kirti Campus, Devaprayag
- Jaipur Campus, Jaipur
- Headquarter Office & Campus, Delhi
- Shri Sadashiv Campus, Puri
- K.J. Somaiya Campus, Mumbai
- Nashik Campus, Nashik
- Lucknow Campus, Lucknow
- Ganganath Jha Campus, Prayagraj
- Bhopal Campus, Bhopal
- Guruvayoor Campus, Thrissur
- Rajiv Gandhi Campus, Sringeri
- Ekalavya Campus, Agartala

== See also ==
- List of Sanskrit universities in India
- Sanskrit revival
