= List of Sanskrit-related topics =

Sanskrit, a major classical language of ancient India, is sacred language of Indian-origin religions. It contributed to the Indianization, especially in Southeast Asia, and it had great influence in the Indosphere of Greater India. The following is a partial list of "Sanskrit" related topics in Wikipedia:

== General ==
- Sanskrit as one of official languages of India.
- Sanskrit revival, attempts at reviving the Sanskrit language.
- Renaming of cities in India to Sanskrit origin, for decolonization.
- Symbolic usage of Sanskrit
- Sanskrit Wikipedia, launched in 2011.

== Religion & scriptures ==
Sanskrit is sacred language of Indian origin religions, such as Hinduism, Jainism & Buddhism.

- Historic Sanskrit texts
- Sanskrit Buddhist literature
- Hindu scriptures
  - List of Hindu texts in Sanskrit
  - Sanskrit prosody, one of the six Vedangas, or limbs, of Vedic studies
  - Legendary Hindu creatures in Sanskrit mythology

== Grammar ==
- Sanskrit grammar
- Sanskrit verbs
- Sanskrit compound, the agglutinative nominal system of Classical Sanskrit
- Sanskrit nouns
- Sanskrit pronouns and determiners

== Education & libraries ==
- Sanskrit studies
  - Clay Sanskrit Library
- Sanskrit academic institutes outside India
- Sanskrit universities in India
  - Maharishi Balmiki Sanskrit University in Haryana
  - Sanskrit Collegiate School in Kolkata
  - Sanskrit College and University in Kolkata
- Sankritised mottos of universities and colleges

== Arts ==
- Sanskrit drama
- Sanskrit poets

== Archaeology & historic ==
- Mandala (political model), driver of Sanskrit insurance in Southeast Asia
- Sanskrit inscriptions in the Malay world

== Honorifics & titles ==
- Influence of Sanskrit honorifics & titles in Southeast Asia
  - Filipino
  - Indonesian
  - Malay
  - Thai

== Mottos ==
- Sankritised mottos of universities and colleges
- States of Indian with Sanskrit mottos
- List of institutions with Sanskrit mottos

== Loanwords ==
Sanskrit loanwords in other languages.

- Sanskritisation (language)
- English words of Sanskrit origin
- Hindi words of Sanskrit origin
- Indonesian words of Sanskrit origin
  - List of Sanskrit & Indian-origin words in various Indonesian languages
  - List of Bhasa Indonesia words of Sanskrit origin
- Philippines
  - List of Cebuano words of Sanskrit origin
  - List of Tagalog words of Sanskrit origin
- Thai words of Sanskrit origin

== Current publications ==
- Sanskrit Press and Depository in West Bengal in India

== See also ==
- Sanskrit category on Wikipedia
- Sanskriti (disambiguation)
- Indosphere, refers to Sanskritised areas of Asia, especially South Asia and Southeast Asia
- Sanskritisation, a particular form of social change found in India, in which castes placed lower in the caste hierarchy seek upward mobility by emulating the rituals and practices of the upper or dominant castes
- Sanskritism, a term used to indicate words that are coined out of Sanskrit for modern usage in India, Sri Lanka and elsewhere or neologisms
- SanskritOCR, an optical character recognition software for Sanskrit, Hindi and other Indian languages based on Devanagari script
