= List of Indic loanwords in Indonesian =

Although Hinduism and Buddhism are no longer the major religions of Indonesia, Sanskrit, the language vehicle for these religions, is still held in high esteem, and its status is comparable with that of Latin in English and other Western European languages. It reflects the enduring influence of Hindu-Buddhist kingdoms in Indonesia, where Sanskrit was used for religious texts, royal inscriptions, and scholarly literature, much like Latin was in medieval Europe. Sanskrit is also the main source for neologisms; these are usually formed from Sanskrit roots. For example, the name of Jayapura city (former Hollandia) and Jayawijaya Mountains (former Orange Range) in the Indonesian province of Papua were coined in the 1960s; both are Sanskrit origin names to replace its Dutch colonial names. Some Indonesian contemporary medals of honor and awards, such as Bintang Mahaputra medal, Kalpataru award and Adipura award, are also Sanskrit derived names.

The loanwords from Sanskrit cover many aspects of religion, art and everyday life. The Sanskrit influence came from contacts with India long ago before the 1st century. The words are either directly borrowed from India or through the intermediary of the Old Javanese language. In the classical language of Java, Old Javanese, the number of Sanskrit loanwords is far greater. The Old Javanese — English dictionary by Prof. P.J. Zoetmulder, S.J. (1982) contains no fewer than 25,500 entries. Almost half are Sanskrit loanwords. Sanskrit loanwords, unlike those from other languages except Arabic and Persian, have entered the basic vocabulary of Indonesian to such an extent that, for many, they are no longer perceived to be foreign.

There are some rules of forming loans from Sanskrit: s, ṣ, and ś merge to single s; v changes to w, and the original aspiration, retroflexion, and vowel length is lost (most similar to some earliest stages of Insular Indic, including the ancestor of Sinhala, Elu).

== Loanwords ==
Source forms are Sanskrit unless another language is specified. Notes identify local formations and uncertain derivations.
Indonesian word	Indonesian meaning	Source form	Transliteration	Source meaning	Note
abrak	mica (archaic)	अभ्रक	abhraka	mica; talc	
acara	event; programme; agenda or item on an agenda	आचार	ācāra	conduct; custom; practice	The event and programme senses developed in Indonesian.
adakala	sometimes; occasionally	काल	kāla	time	Malay/Indonesian ada + kala; only the second element is Sanskrit-derived.
adi-	superior; great; excellent; foremost	आदि; अधि	ādi; adhi	ādi: beginning, first; adhi: above, over, besides	Indonesian adi- combines meanings associated with Sanskrit ādi and adhi.
adicita	ideology (archaic or literary)	आदि + चित्त	ādi + citta	first/beginning + thought or mind	A modern Indonesian formation, adi- + cita, classified as a neologism by de Casparis.
adikara	power or authority; powerful; acting arbitrarily	अधिकार	adhikāra	authority; jurisdiction; right	
adikarya	masterpiece; great work	आदि / अधि + कार्य	ādi / adhi + kārya	first/foremost or above + work; task	An Indonesian formation, adi- + karya, using Sanskrit-derived elements.
adikuasa	extremely powerful; superpower (of a state)	आदि + वश	ādi + vaśa	first/foremost + power or control	A modern Indonesian formation, adi- + kuasa, classified as a neologism by de Casparis. Kuasa is derived from vaśa.
adimarga	boulevard; wide avenue, usually lined with trees	आदि + मार्ग	ādi + mārga	first/foremost + road or path	A modern Indonesian formation, adi- + marga.
adipati, dipati	ruler; governor; historical title of a regional ruler or regent	अधिपति	adhipati	overlord; lord; ruler	A historical title of regional rulers and regents.
adiraja	supreme royal title; sovereign	अधिराज / आदिराज	adhirāja / ādirāja	emperor / first king	De Casparis gives both adhirāja and ādirāja as possible sources.
adiratna	precious jewel; figuratively, a beautiful woman	आदि + रत्न	ādi + ratna	first/foremost + jewel	De Casparis analyzes the word as ādi + ratna. The jewel metaphor also refers to a beautiful woman.
adisiswa	outstanding student; exceptionally distinguished pupil	आदि / अधि + शिष्य	ādi / adhi + śiṣya	first/foremost or above + pupil or disciple	An Indonesian formation, adi- + siswa, using Sanskrit-derived elements.
aditokoh	principal character; figure regarded as noble or auspicious	आदि / अधि	ādi / adhi	first/foremost; above	A hybrid Indonesian formation, adi- + tokoh; only the first element is Sanskrit-derived.
adiwangsa	noble lineage; nobility; person of noble descent	आदि / अधि + वंश	ādi / adhi + vaṃśa	first/foremost or superior + lineage or dynasty	An Indonesian formation using adi- and wangsa, the latter related to bangsa.
adiwarna	very beautiful; exceptionally fine	अधि + वर्ण	adhi + varṇa	above/superior + colour; beauty; appearance	De Casparis analyzes the Sanskrit-derived elements as adhi + varṇa.
agama	religion	आगम	āgama	traditional doctrine; received sacred teaching or scripture	Sanskrit āgama can denote a received body of religious teaching; the Indonesian meaning extends to religion generally.
Agni	the god who rules fire and acts as messenger of the gods; god of fire (Hinduism)	अग्नि	agni	fire; sacrificial fire; the god of fire	
ahimsa	nonviolence; non-injury to living beings	अहिंसा	ahiṃsā	non-injury; harmlessness	An ethical principle of non-injury in Indian religious traditions.
aksara	letter; written character; writing system or script	अक्षर	akṣara	syllable; letter; imperishable	The borrowing reflects the linguistic senses of akṣara; the Sanskrit word also means imperishable.
alpa	negligent; inattentive; remiss	अल्प	alpa	small; little; slight	The meaning shifted from small or slight to negligent or inattentive.
amerta	immortal; eternal; unforgettable	अमृत	amṛta	immortal; nectar conferring immortality	Amṛta is also the divine nectar conferring immortality; de Casparis records this noun sense in Indonesian.
amra	a kind of mango whose fruit is shaped like the ambarella (kedondong)	आम्र	āmra	the mango tree (Mangifera indica); its fruit	
ananta	endless; infinite (proposed loan)	अनन्त	ananta	endless; boundless; infinite; also a divine epithet/name	Sanskrit ananta is also a divine epithet or name. Its use as an Indonesian common word requires a lexicographic source.
aneka	many kinds; various; diverse	अनेक	aneka	not one; many	From privative an- + eka, one.
aneka ragam	varied; diverse; of many kinds	अनेक + राग	aneka + rāga	many + colour; passion; musical mode	A Malay/Indonesian combination of aneka and ragam. De Casparis suggests possible Tamil mediation for ragam.
anekawarna	multicoloured; of many colours	अनेकवर्ण	anekavarṇa	many-coloured	De Casparis records the joined form anekawarna.
anggota	limb; member; component	अङ्ग	aṅga	limb; member; part	The first element is related to aṅga. The origin of the ending is uncertain; de Casparis offers a tentative explanation involving a Prakrit form.
angka	numeral; digit; number; numerical mark	अङ्क	aṅka	mark; numerical figure; number	
angkara	cruel; violent; insolent; selfish or grasping conduct	अहंकार	ahaṃkāra	self-consciousness; ego; egotism; pride	Ahaṃkāra also denotes the ego or principle of individuation in Sāṃkhya philosophy.
angkasa	sky; air; space	आकाश	ākāśa	open space; sky; atmosphere	Ākāśa also denotes space or ether as a philosophical element.
angkasawan	astronaut; radio broadcaster	आकाश + -वन्त्	ākāśa + -vant	sky/space + possessing	Indonesian angkasa + -wan. The suffix derives from Sanskrit -vant, whose masculine nominative is -vān.
angkusa	hooked staff used to drive elephants or deer; goad	अङ्कुश	aṅkuśa	hook, especially an elephant-driver's hook	
angsa	goose	हंस	haṃsa	goose; gander; swan; a mythic waterbird	Sanskrit haṃsa has been identified with several waterbirds; Indonesian angsa generally denotes a goose.
angsana	angsana/narra tree, Pterocarpus indicus	असन	asana	a tree name, lexicographically identified with Terminalia tomentosa or Pterocarpus marsupium	The Indonesian and Sanskrit tree names have different botanical referents. Sanskrit āsana is also attested as a variant tree name, distinct from āsana meaning seat.
angsoka	an ornamental flowering shrub, Pavetta indica, and related plants	अशोक	aśoka	the aśoka tree (Saraca asoca), noted for its red flowers; literally “not causing sorrow”	KBBI applies the name to Pavetta indica, a different plant from the Sanskrit aśoka.
aniaya	mistreatment; abuse; oppression; cruelty	अन्याय	anyāya	injustice; unlawful or improper conduct	
anjali	a gesture of respect made by joining or clasping the palms before the chest or by bowing the head (Buddhism); to put the palms together before the chest in respect or worship (Hinduism)	अञ्जलि	añjali	the open hands placed side by side; raised to the forehead as a mark of supplication; reverence, salutation	
antara, antar-	between; among; interval; inter-	अन्तर; अन्तर्	antara; antar	antara: interior, interval, distance; antar: within, between, among	Sanskrit antara is a noun or adjective; antar is an indeclinable meaning within or between.
antariksa	space; atmosphere and outer space	अन्तरिक्ष	antarikṣa	intermediate space between earth and heaven; atmosphere; sky	In Vedic cosmology, antarikṣa is the middle region between earth and heaven.
anugerah	gift; favour; grace; award	अनुग्रह	anugraha	favour; kindness; beneficence; assistance	The award or honour sense extends the meaning of a gift or favour from a superior.
anumerta	posthumous; posthumously conferred rank or honour	अनु + मृत	anu- + mṛta	after + dead	A modern Indonesian formation from anu- and mṛta, classified as a neologism by de Casparis.
anuswara	sign for a nasal consonant or nasal sound	अनुस्वार	anusvāra	nasal after-sound; nasal sound represented by a dot above a preceding vowel	In Sanskrit writing, anusvāra is represented by the dot ं above a preceding vowel.
Aranyaka	a scripture containing Hindu philosophy, religious thought and myths of the gods, used as a reference by sadhus (Hinduism)	आरण्यक	āraṇyaka	relating to the forest; a class of religious and philosophical writings attached to the Brāhmaṇas, composed or studied in forests	
arca	statue, especially one carved from stone in the form of a person or animal	अर्चा	arcā	worship, adoration; an image or idol made for worship	
ardi	mountain (classical)	अद्रि	adri	stone; rock; mountain	KBBI also lists ardi “earth, land” as a separate classical homonym.
arti	meaning; sense; significance	अर्थ	artha	meaning; sense; purpose; object	
arya	historical title for a high official in a Javanese kingdom	आर्य	ārya	noble; honourable; respected person or master	The Indonesian word is a historical Javanese title; the ethnolinguistic use of Arya or Aryan is a separate sense.
asa	hope	आशा	āśā	hope; wish; expectation	
asana	a seated posture or leg position in religious iconography; a seat or throne	आसन	āsana	sitting; seated posture; seat	Used in archaeology and religious iconography; Sanskrit āsana also denotes a yogic posture.
asmara	love; amorous passion	स्मर	smara	love, especially erotic love; remembrance; the god of love	
asrama	dormitory; hostel; communal residence	आश्रम	āśrama	hermitage; abode of ascetics; stage of religious life	The Indonesian word developed a general residential sense. Sanskrit āśrama also denotes one of the traditional stages of religious life.
asta-	eight	अष्ट	aṣṭa-	eight (combining form of aṣṭan)	Distinct from Indonesian asta meaning cubit, derived from Sanskrit hasta.
aswa	horse	अश्व	aśva	horse; stallion	KBBI marks the word as Sanskrit.
atau	or	अथवा	athavā	or; or rather; alternatively	
atma	soul; spirit; life	आत्मन्	ātman	self; soul; vital principle; breath	
awatara	incarnation of the god Vishnu; avatar (from Balinese)	अवतार	avatāra	descent, especially of a deity from heaven; the incarnations of Viṣṇu	
baca	read	वचस् / वच	vacas / vaca	speech; speaking	De Casparis proposes vacas or vaca and compares the traditional Malay sense of reading aloud with Sanskrit vācayati.
bagai	like; as; kind or sort	भाग	bhāga	part; share; portion	De Casparis derives the word from bhāga with an additional non-Sanskrit element.
bagi	for; portion; divide or share	भागी- (भागीकृ)	bhāgī- (in bhāgīkṛ)	“into parts” in the verbal expression bhāgīkṛ “divide, share”	De Casparis and the World Loanword Database connect bagi with bhāgī(-kṛ). The related noun bhāga means a part or share.
baginda	royal honorific or designation; Majesty	भाग्य	bhāgya	good fortune; fortunate	Formed with the local honorific element -(n)da.
bahagia	happy; fortunate; happiness	भाग्य	bhāgya	fortunate; good fortune; happiness	
bahara	load, cargo; a unit of weight that varied with the goods weighed (classical)	भार	bhāra	burden, load, weight; a particular weight	
bahasa	language	भाषा	bhāṣā	speech; language	
bahaya	danger; peril	भय	bhaya	fear; danger; peril	
bahtera	ship; boat (literary)	वहित्र	vahitra	boat; vessel	
bahu	shoulder	बाहु	bāhu	arm	Distinct from bahu- meaning many, which has a short a in Sanskrit.
bahu-	many; multi-	बहु	bahu-	many; much; abundant	Distinct from bāhu, arm, with a long ā.
bahwa	that (conjunction)	भाव	bhāva	being; existence; state; condition	De Casparis proposes the derivation from bhāva on phonological and semantic grounds.
baiduri	a gemstone; commonly opal, with several named varieties	वैडूर्य	vaiḍūrya	cat’s-eye gem	Modern gemstone classifications do not correspond exactly: Indonesian baiduri includes opal and several named varieties, while Sanskrit vaiḍūrya is traditionally glossed as cat’s-eye.
baja, waja	steel; figuratively, strong or resolute	वज्र	vajra	thunderbolt; diamond; hard iron or steel	The steel sense is distinct from Malay/Indonesian baja meaning manure or fertilizer.
bakti, bhakti	devotion; loyalty; service; homage	भक्ति	bhakti	devotion; attachment; worship; faith	Bakti is the usual Indonesian spelling; bhakti occurs particularly in religious contexts and names.
bala	troops; army; military force	बल	bala	strength; power; force; army	Distinct from bala meaning calamity, which is Arabic-derived. Bala bantuan means reinforcements.
bana	arrow with a wooden shaft and a metal tip	बाण	bāṇa	reed shaft; arrow	
bangsa	nation; people; ethnic group; lineage; kind	वंश	vaṃśa	lineage; family; dynasty	
bangsawan	noble; aristocrat; person of noble descent	वंश + -वन्त्	vaṃśa + -vant	lineage + possessing	Malay/Indonesian bangsa + -wan; the suffix derives from Sanskrit -vant, whose masculine nominative is -vān.
Baruna	Baruna (Varuṇa), a major oceanic deity	वरुण	varuṇa	Varuṇa, a major Vedic deity, later especially lord of the waters and ocean	Varuṇa was a major Vedic deity associated with cosmic and moral order. In later traditions he is especially a deity of the waters and ocean and a guardian of the west.
basmi	burn up; destroy; eradicate	भस्मी-; भस्मन्	bhasmī-; bhasman	bhasmī-: into ashes; bhasman: ashes	De Casparis identifies bhasmī- in bhasmīkṛ, to reduce to ashes.
bau (land measure)	traditional unit of land area, about 7,096 m² (0.71 ha), with local variation	बाहु	bāhu	arm	Historical Javanese bau is associated with the word for shoulder; the precise route of transmission is uncertain. The land measure is distinct from inherited Austronesian bau, smell.
bayu	wind (literary); the wind deity Bayu	वायु	vāyu	wind; air; the wind god Vāyu	Bayu is also used as the name of the wind deity.
beda	difference; distinction	भेद	bheda	breaking, splitting; distinction, difference	
bejana	vessel; container; basin; tank	भाजन	bhājana	vessel; pot; receptacle	
bela	defend; protect; care for	वेला	velā	limit; time; occasion; hour of death	De Casparis tentatively proposes a development from the hour-of-death sense through bela, to follow someone in death, and then sacrifice one’s life in defence.
belaka	merely; only; entirely; all without exception	बालक	bālaka	young; child; boy	De Casparis, citing Gonda, attributes belaka to bālaka; the semantic development is uncertain.
belantara	vast (especially of forest); wilderness or jungle	वनान्तर	vanāntara	interior of a forest	Especially in hutan belantara, an extensive forest or wilderness.
belia	young; youthful	बाल्य	bālya	childhood; infancy; youth	Especially in muda belia, very young; the Sanskrit source is a noun denoting childhood.
bencana	disaster; calamity	वञ्चन	vañcana	deception; fraud	The Indonesian word also has archaic senses of disturbance, temptation and deception.
benda	object; thing; property	भाण्ड	bhāṇḍa	vessel; utensil; goods; property	
bendahara	treasurer	भाण्डागार	bhāṇḍāgāra	treasury; storehouse	De Casparis derives the word from bhāṇḍāgāra. The shorter Sanskrit form bhāṇḍāra also means a treasury or storehouse.
berahi, birahi	passionate love; sexual desire	विरहिन्	virahin	separated, especially from a beloved person	Birahi is a variant of berahi.
beraksa	a tree, Cassia fistula, described in KBBI as related to the banyan	वृक्ष	vṛkṣa	tree	KBBI also lists beraksa “winged horse” as a separate homonym.
berhala	idol; image of a deity	भट्टार	bhaṭṭāra	lord; noble lord	De Casparis proposes transmission through Prakrit.
berita	news; report	वृत्त	vṛtta	event; occurrence; account	Compare warta.
bestari	learned; well educated; wise (literary)	विस्तारिन्	vistārin	extending; extensive; broad	A literary word also associated with good character.
biara	monastery; convent	विहार	vihāra	monastery, especially Buddhist or Jain; also recreation	In Indonesian, biara also denotes Christian monasteries and convents. Compare wihara.
biarawan	monk; male member of a monastic community	विहार	vihāra	monastery (base)	An Indonesian derivative of biara with the Sanskrit-derived suffix -wan.
biasa	usual; customary; ordinary	अभ्यास	abhyāsa	repetition; practice; habit	
biaya	cost; expense	व्यय	vyaya	expenditure; spending; loss	
bicara	speech; talk; speak	विचार	vicāra	consideration; investigation; discussion	
bidadari	celestial maiden; fairy; figuratively, a very beautiful woman	विद्याधरी	vidyādharī	female vidyādhara; supernatural female being or fairy	
bidan	midwife	विद्वान्	vidvān	learned; wise; a learned man	Vidvān is the masculine nominative singular of the adjective vidvas-/vidvāṃs-, “learned”.
bidara	a tree common on seashores, Ziziphus rotundifolia; the name also covers other plants, such as bidara cina (Ziziphus jujuba)	बदर	badara	the jujube tree (Ziziphus jujuba); its edible fruit	
bija (classical)	seed	बीज	bīja	seed	A classical word; compare modern biji.
bijak	wise; discerning; clever	विचक्षण	vicakṣaṇa	discerning; wise; clever	A shortened form related to bijaksana. Bijak occurs as a proper name in a tenth-century Old Javanese inscription.
bijaksana	wise; prudent; discerning	विचक्षण	vicakṣaṇa	discerning; wise; experienced	
biji	seed; grain	बीज	bīja	seed	Indonesian biji also functions as a classifier.
biksu	Buddhist monk	भिक्षु	bhikṣu	mendicant; Buddhist monk	
biksuni	Buddhist nun	भिक्षुणी	bhikṣuṇī	Buddhist nun	The source form is the feminine counterpart of bhikṣu.
bila	when; if	वेला	velā	time; occasion	
binaraga	bodybuilding	राग	rāga	colour; passion; attachment	A modern Indonesian compound of Arabic-derived bina, “build”, and Sanskrit-derived raga, “body”. The body sense belongs to the local development of raga.
binasa	destroyed; ruined; perished	विनाश	vināśa	destruction; ruin; death	
bisa	venom; poison; also can, be able	विष	viṣa	poison; venom	The senses “venom” and “can, be able” are connected through semantic extensions involving potency and skill.
boga	food; dishes; cuisine	भोग	bhoga	enjoyment; eating; an object of enjoyment, including food	Old Javanese bhoga also denotes enjoyment of eating and drinking.
brahmana	Hindu priest; the highest caste in Hinduism; a member of the priestly class	ब्राह्मण	brāhmaṇa	a Brahmin, a member of the first of the twice-born classes, generally a priest	
brata	an act of self-restraint, such as fasting or keeping vigil (Hinduism)	व्रत	vrata	will, law, rule; a religious vow or observance such as fasting or continence	
buana	world; earth (literary)	भुवन	bhuvana	world; earth; place of existence	
budaya	culture; cultivated thought or reason	बुद्धि + उदय (?)	buddhi + udaya (?)	intellect + rise; success (proposed components)	A local formation analysed as buddhi plus daya. The origin of the second element is disputed; udaya is one proposed source.
budi	reason; character; virtue; kindness	बुद्धि	buddhi	intellect; discernment; understanding	
budiman	wise; virtuous; a wise or virtuous person	बुद्धिमान्	buddhimān	intelligent; wise	Buddhimān is the masculine nominative singular of buddhimat (strong stem buddhimant-), “intelligent, wise”.
bujangga	scholar; poet; sage (literary)	भुजङ्ग	bhujaṅga (?)	snake; also a dissolute companion of a prince	The etymology is disputed. Proposed explanations include a semantic development from Sanskrit bhujaṅga and Sanskritization of native bujang, “unmarried young man”, in the sense of a student.
bukti	proof; evidence	भुक्ति	bhukti	enjoyment; fruition; possession	Gonda proposed that influence from Sanskrit vyakti, “manifestation; visible appearance”, contributed to the Indonesian meaning.
bumi	earth; land; ground	भूमि	bhūmi	earth; land; ground	
bupati	regent; head of a kabupaten	भूपति	bhūpati	lord of the earth; king	Borrowed through Javanese.
busana	clothing; dress; attire	भूषण	bhūṣaṇa	ornament; adornment	
cabai, cabe	chilli pepper (Capsicum); in cabai jawa, long pepper	चवि	cavi	a pepper identified in older dictionaries as Piper chaba	Cabe is a common variant. The historical pepper referent differs from modern chilli peppers. The route and direction of borrowing are uncertain; De Casparis also considers transmission from Southeast Asia to India.
cahaya	light; radiance	छाया	chāyā	shade; shadow; reflection; also lustre or light	
cakra	wheel; discus; divine discus weapon	चक्र	cakra	wheel; circle; discus; cycle	
cakram	disc; discus	चक्र	cakra	wheel; disc; circle	
cakrawala	horizon; firmament; figuratively, range of knowledge	चक्रवाल	cakravāla	circle; a mythical mountain range encircling the world	In traditional cosmology, cakravāla is the encircling mountain range marking the boundary of light and darkness.
canda	joke; banter	छन्द	chanda (?)	pleasing; alluring; pleasure; desire	The proposed derivation from Sanskrit chanda is uncertain.
candi	ancient Hindu or Buddhist temple or monument	चण्डी	Caṇḍī	a name of the goddess Durgā	Caṇḍī is a name of Durgā; Caṇḍikā is another form of the name.
candu	opium; figuratively, an absorbing enthusiasm or addiction	சாந்து	cāntu (Tamil; proposed)	paste; mortar; sandalwood paste	The source is disputed. Hoogervorst proposes Tamil cāntu, “paste”, and challenges the proposed Hindi caṇḍū route. The Indonesian word denotes an opium preparation.
candra	moon (literary); lunar	चन्द्र	candra	moon; shining; also the moon deity	Chandra also occurs in personal names. Sanskrit candra denotes both the moon and its personified deity.
candradimuka	the heavenly crater in wayang; figuratively, a place of rigorous training	—	—	—	Its proposed connection with Sanskrit candramukha, “moon-faced”, is uncertain.
cara	way; manner; method; custom	आचार	ācāra	conduct; custom; customary practice	Compare acara, which derives from the same Sanskrit word but has a different Indonesian meaning.
cari	search; look for	चारिन्	cārin	moving about; wandering; going	
catur	chess	चतुरङ्ग	caturaṅga	having four limbs or parts; a fourfold army; chess	The Sanskrit term refers to the four divisions of an army and to the game of chess.
catur-	four-; quadruple- (bound element)	चतुर्	catur	four (compound form)	A bound numeral element, distinct from catur, “chess”.
cedera	injury; damage; also dispute or breach	छिद्र	chidra	hole; cleft; defect	
celaka	unfortunate; unlucky; disastrous	छलक	chalaka (?)	delusive; deceitful	The proposed derivation from chalaka is disputed because of the difference in meaning.
celana	trousers; underpants (colloquial)	चलनक	calanaka	a short petticoat worn by dancing girls	WOLD gives Hindi-Urdu charnā “half-trousers” as the immediate source; ultimately from Sanskrit.
cemara	tuft of horsehair or similar used as an ornament or a fly whisk; hairpiece; casuarina tree (Casuarina equisetifolia)	चामर	cāmara	chowrie, a yak-tail fly whisk; a plume on the heads of horses	KBBI lists the casuarina tree as a second homonym; WOLD derives the tree name from the same source.
cempaka	champak; champak tree or flower	चम्पक	campaka	champak tree	The Sanskrit word denotes the champak tree, traditionally classified as Michelia champaca.
cena	mark; sign; proof; a healed scar on a fighting cock	चिह्न	cihna	mark, spot, stamp, sign, characteristic	
cendala (classical)	vile; base; ignoble	चण्डाल	caṇḍāla	member of a historically excluded social group; outcaste	The Sanskrit term is a historical social designation; the Indonesian word developed a derogatory adjectival sense.
cendana	sandalwood (Santalum album)	चन्दन	candana	sandalwood; sandalwood tree or paste	
cenderawasih	bird of paradise (family Paradisaeidae)	चन्द्र + वासिन्	candra + vāsin	moon + dwelling, or dweller	Analysed by De Casparis as a local compound of Sanskrit candra and vāsin.
cengkerama	light-hearted conversation; banter; a pleasure outing	चङ्क्रम	caṅkrama	going about, a walk; a place for walking about	The verb bercengkerama keeps the older sense “to stroll for pleasure” in classical usage.
ceria	cheerful; radiant; clear; classically pure; also a coronation formula	चर्या	caryā	conduct; practice; observance of rites	The coronation-formula sense is archaic.
cerita	story; narrative	चरित	carita	deeds; conduct; life or adventures	Compare Buddhacarita, a narrative of the Buddha’s life and deeds.
cerna	digested; dissolved; absorbed	जीर्ण	jīrṇa	old; worn out; decayed; digested	The Indonesian verb is mencerna, “digest”.
cetera	parasol, especially a ceremonial umbrella of state (classical)	छत्त्र	chattra	parasol, an ensign of royal power	KBBI also lists cetera as a variant of cerita “story”, which is a different word.
cinta	love; affection; longing	चिन्ता	cintā	thought; care; anxiety	The older Indonesian sense “worry” is closer to the Sanskrit meaning.
cipta	creative thought; imagination; creative faculty	चित्त	citta	thought; mind; intention	The corresponding Indonesian verbs are mencipta and menciptakan, “create”.
cita	feeling; idea; aspiration	चित्त	citta	thought; mind; intention	Cita-cita denotes ideals or ambitions. The homonymous word for cloth has a different etymology.
cita rasa	taste; flavour	चित्त + रस	citta + rasa	thought or mind + taste or flavour	An Indonesian compound of Sanskrit-derived cita and rasa.
citra	image; picture; impression	चित्र	citra	picture; multicoloured; variegated	
cuaca	weather	स्वच्छ	svaccha	very transparent or clear, pellucid; bright-coloured	WOLD notes that in Classical Malay the word meant “clear (weather)” and that the sense “weather” is modern.
cuci	wash; clean by washing	शुचि	śuci	clean; pure	Compare suci, “pure; holy”, which preserves an adjectival sense.
cuka	vinegar	चुक्र	cukra	vinegar	
cumbu	sweet talk used to coax or court; banter	चुम्ब	cumba	kissing; a kiss	
curi	steal	चोर	cora	thief; robber	De Casparis connects the derivative pencuri, “thief”, with Sanskrit cora.
curiga	suspicious; also a kris (classical)	छुरिका	churikā	knife; dagger	De Casparis proposes transmission through Prakrit. The relationship between the weapon and suspicion senses is uncertain.
dadih	thick or thickened milk of cows, buffalo and similar animals	दधि	dadhi	coagulated milk; thick sour milk	
dahaga	thirsty; thirst	दाह	dāha (?)	burning; heat	The connection with dāha is proposed, but the immediate source is uncertain. De Casparis suggests a corresponding Prakrit form.
daitia	giant; ogre (classical)	दैत्य	daitya	a son of Diti; a demon	
daksina	south; right (side) (classical)	दक्षिण	dakṣiṇa	right (not left); south, southern	
damaru	small drum (archaic)	डमरु	ḍamaru	a sacred hourglass-shaped drum used by Śiva and by mendicants	
dana	funds; donation	दान	dāna	giving; gift; donation; offering	
danawa	giant; ogre (classical)	दानव	dānava	a class of demons, enemies of the gods, said to be children of Danu	
danta	tooth; ivory; white like ivory (classical)	दन्त	danta	tooth; an elephant's tusk, ivory	
Danuh	Sagittarius, the ninth sign of the zodiac; the archer	धनुस्	dhanus	bow; the zodiacal sign Sagittarius	
darma, dharma	duty; obligation; virtuous conduct	धर्म	dharma	law; prescribed conduct; duty; virtue; religious teaching	The spelling dharma is also used in religious contexts.
darpana	a round or oval mirror with a finely carved handle, as depicted in sculpture (archaic)	दर्पण	darpaṇa	mirror (literally “causing vanity”)	
dasawarsa	decade; ten years	दश + वर्ष	daśa + varṣa	ten + year	A formation from the Sanskrit-derived elements dasa, “ten”, and warsa, “year”.
daya	power; capacity; ability	उदय / हृदय (?)	udaya / hṛdaya (?)	rise; success / heart; mind (proposed sources)	The etymology is disputed: udaya and hṛdaya have both been proposed as sources.
delima	pomegranate (Punica granatum)	दाडिम	dāḍima	the pomegranate tree; its fruit	
denda	fine; monetary penalty	दण्ड	daṇḍa	rod; punishment; penalty, including a fine	
derita	suffering; hardship that has to be borne	धृत	dhṛta	held, borne, maintained, supported	The sense of bearing developed into that of enduring hardship. Shastri also gives durita “suffering, difficulty” as a possible source.
derma	charitable donation; alms	धर्म	dharma	duty; righteousness; religious merit; good works	A doublet of Indonesian darma/dharma.
desa	village; rural settlement	देश	deśa	place; region; country	Transmitted through Javanese, according to de Casparis.
dewa	god; deity	देव	deva	god; deity	
dewata	deity; divine nature	देवता	devatā	divinity; deity; godhead	Although grammatically feminine in Sanskrit, devatā can denote a deity of either sex.
dewi	goddess	देवी	devī	goddess; female deity	
diksa	berdiksa: to be ordained as a Buddhist monk (archaic)	दीक्षा	dīkṣā	consecration for a religious ceremony; dedication, initiation	
dina (classical; uncertain)	day (claimed classical use)	दिन	dina	day	The attribution of this form to classical Indonesian requires a lexicographic source.
dina (bound form)	wretched; poor, especially in hina dina	दीन	dīna	wretched; distressed; miserable	Occurs in hina dina, “lowly and poor”. The Sanskrit source dīna is distinct from dina, “day”.
dirgahayu	long-lived; long live …!	दीर्घायुस्	dīrghāyus	long-lived; having a long life	From dīrgha, “long”, and āyus, “life”. Used in wishes such as Dirgahayu Republik Indonesia, “Long live the Republic of Indonesia”.
dosa	sin; wrongdoing	दोष	doṣa	fault; defect; vice; offence	
duaja	flag, banner; emblem, badge; signal	ध्वज	dhvaja	banner, flag, standard; mark, emblem, ensign	KBBI marks the word as Sanskrit.
duka	sorrow; sadness; sad	दुःख	duḥkha	pain; suffering; sorrow; distress	
duli	dust clinging to the feet; feet (classical); an honorific used in addressing or speaking of a ruler (classical)	धूलि	dhūli	dust; powder; pollen	The royal honorific refers to the dust beneath the ruler's feet, as in Duli Yang Maha Mulia.
dupa	incense	धूप	dhūpa	incense; aromatic smoke	
durhaka	disobedient to God, parents and others; disloyal to lawful authority; rebellious	द्रोह	droha	injury, mischief, harm, perfidy, treachery	Shastri gives the source as drohaka, a form Monier-Williams does not list.
duta	envoy; emissary; ambassador	दूत	dūta	messenger; envoy	
durjana	wicked; malicious; villain	दुर्जन	durjana	bad person; villain; wicked	
dusta	false; lying; lie; falsehood	दुष्ट	duṣṭa	corrupt; faulty; wrong; false; wicked	
dwi- (bound form)	two; double; bi-	द्वि	dvi	two	
eka- (bound form)	one; single; mono-	एक	eka	one; single	
emas	gold; figuratively, money or something of high value	माष	māṣa	a bean; a particular weight of gold	WOLD gives Khmer mās “gold” as the immediate source; ultimately from Sanskrit. The meaning moved from a unit of weight for gold to the metal itself. The short form mas is also used.
endul	cradle; swing (classical)	हिन्दोल	hindola	swing; swinging cradle or hammock	
gada	club; mace	गदा	gadā	mace, club, bludgeon	
gaharu	agarwood, a fragrant wood usually from Aquilaria malaccensis	अगरु	agaru	agallochum, the fragrant aloeswood	
gajah	elephant	गज	gaja	elephant	De Casparis compares the Sanskrit nominative gajaḥ.
ganda	smell; scent	गन्ध	gandha	smell, odour; fragrance, perfume	This is the second of three KBBI homonyms; ganda “double, -fold” is listed separately.
gandewa	bow (weapon)	गाण्डीव	gāṇḍīva	Arjuna's bow; a bow in general	
gangsa	bronze, especially as used for gamelan instruments and bells	कांस्य	kāṃsya	made of bell metal; bell metal, brass	KBBI also lists gangsa as a colloquial form of angsa “goose”, which is a different word.
gapura	gateway; entrance gate	गोपुर	gopura	city gate; gateway, especially a temple gateway	
garba	belly (classical)	गर्भ	garbha	womb; inside, interior; foetus	
garuda, geroda	Garuda, the mythic bird; the Indonesian national emblem	गरुड	garuḍa	Garuda, the bird associated with Viṣṇu	Geroda is an archaic variant of garuda.
gatra	form, shape; aspect; a slot in a sentence filled by a constituent (linguistics)	गात्र	gātra	a limb or member of the body; the body	Indonesian uses the word for “form, aspect” and as a linguistic term, a shift from the Sanskrit sense “limb, body”.
gaya	style; manner; form; force; power	गय	gaya	household; property; wealth	The proposed derivation from Sanskrit gaya is uncertain.
gegana	air; cloud; something that makes a loud noise or explosion, such as thunder or a grenade	गगन	gagana	the atmosphere, sky, firmament	Monier-Williams records no sense of noise or explosion.
gelita, gulita	dark; pitch-dark	गलित	galita	fallen; lost; decayed; waning	The proposed derivation from Sanskrit galita is uncertain.
gembala	herder; shepherd	गोपाल	gopāla	cowherd; herdsman	
gembira	glad; happy; proud; cheerful	गम्भीर	gambhīra	deep, profound; deep-sounding	WOLD classes the word as probably rather than clearly borrowed.
gempa	shaking; earthquake	कम्प	kampa	trembling, tremor, shaking; earthquake	
genta	bell	घण्टा	ghaṇṭā	bell	
gergaji	saw (tool)	क्रकच	krakaca	a saw	WOLD classes the word as perhaps borrowed: the phonological match is poor, and it may come from a later Indic language.
gerha, graha	house; building; office building	गृह	gṛha	house; dwelling	Graha is a variant of gerha. Sanskrit gṛha, “house”, is distinct from graha, “seizure; planet”.
gerhana	eclipse	ग्रहण	grahaṇa	seizing; taking; eclipse	
geta	throne; royal seat (classical); geta peraduan: bedstead, bed	खट्वा	khaṭvā	bedstead, couch, cot	
giri	mountain	गिरि	giri	mountain, hill, rock	
gita	song (literary)	गीत	gīta	song; singing	
goni	jute fibre (Corchorus capsularis); sack made of jute	गोणी	goṇī	sack; also torn or ragged clothes	
gua	cave	गुहा	guhā	cave; hiding place	
gula	sugar	गुड; गुल	guḍa; gula	guḍa: ball; lump sugar, molasses; gula: raw or unrefined sugar, molasses	
gulana	tired; listless; withered	ग्लान	glāna	wearied, languid, exhausted; sick	
gulma	weed; plant that hinders the growth of a crop	गुल्म	gulma	cluster of trees, thicket, bush, shrub	The sense shifted to weeds in Indonesian.
guna	use; usefulness; benefit; purpose; for	गुण	guṇa	quality; property; attribute; merit	
guru	teacher; instructor; guru	गुरु	guru	teacher; spiritual preceptor; venerable person	
harga	price; cost; value	अर्घ	argha	value; price	
harmika	part of a stupa in the form of a railing around the yasti (archaeology)	हर्मिका	harmikā	a summer-house on a stūpa	
harta	wealth; property; assets	अर्थ	artha	wealth; property; purpose; meaning	
hasta	cubit; a forearm-based unit of length	हस्त	hasta	hand; forearm; cubit	
hina	lowly; inferior; dishonourable; contemptible	हीन	hīna	deprived; deficient; inferior; low	
hina dina (phrase)	lowly and poor; very wretched; contemptible	हीन; दीन	hīna; dīna	inferior or deprived; wretched or miserable	An Indonesian phrase combining two Sanskrit-derived words.
husada	medicine; healing; health, especially in names and compounds	औषध	auṣadha	medicine; medicinal herb; drug	Occurs in panti husada, “health clinic”. Its standalone use and precise borrowing route are uncertain.
indra	sense; sensory faculty; sense organ	इन्द्रिय	indriya	sense faculty; sense organ	Distinct from the divine name Indra (इन्द्र).
inggu	asafoetida; rue (Ruta angustifolia)	हिङ्गु	hiṅgu	Ferula asafoetida; the resinous substance prepared from its roots	
irama	rhythm; tempo	विराम	virāma	cessation, end; stop, pause	Shastri lists the form wirama. The sense moved from “pause” to “rhythm”.
istana	palace; official residence	आस्थान	āsthāna	place; assembly; audience hall	
istri	wife	स्त्री	strī	woman; wife	
jaga	be awake; keep watch; guard	जागर्ति	jāgarti	is awake; watches	From a present-tense form of √jāgṛ, “be awake”. De Casparis suggests transmission through Prakrit.
jagat	world; earth; universe	जगत्	jagat	world; earth; living or moving creation	Jones identifies Hindi jagat as the immediate source; ultimately from Sanskrit.
jaksa	public prosecutor	अध्यक्ष	adhyakṣa	superintendent; overseer; official in charge	
jala	fishing net; casting net	जाल	jāla	net; mesh	
jambu	jambu fruit trees and fruits, including guavas and rose apples	जम्बु; जम्बू	jambu; jambū	rose-apple or jambolan tree and fruit	The Indonesian word names several kinds of fruit and fruit tree; its botanical application differs from that of the Sanskrit source.
jampi	incantation; spell; charm	जप	japa	muttering or murmuring a prayer or sacred formula	
janda	widow; divorced woman	रण्डा	raṇḍā	widow	Also found as randa.
jasa	merit; service; valuable deed	यशस्	yaśas	fame; glory; honour	Jones derives it from yaśas. De Casparis also considers vyāsa, “diffusion”, and abhyāsa, “exertion”, as alternative etymologies.
jatayu	name of a great garuda bird in wayang stories (classical)	जटायु	jaṭāyu	the king of the vultures in the Rāmāyaṇa	
jati	teak (Tectona grandis)	जाति	jāti	a jasmine species (Jasminum grandiflorum); also birth, kind, genuine nature	The plant name shifted from jasmine in Sanskrit to teak in Indonesian. Indonesian jati, “genuine”, is a related use.
Jawa	Java; Javanese	यव	yava	barley; grain	The etymology is disputed. Gonda proposed that indigenous Jawa was Sanskritized as yava in Yavadvīpa and subsequently borrowed back.
jaya	victorious; successful; glorious	जय	jaya	victory; triumph	
jelata	common; ordinary, especially rakyat jelata, common people	जनता	janatā	community; people; mankind	The derivation from janatā is uncertain. Jones marks it as doubtful; de Casparis notes the difficulty of explaining the change from n to l.
jelita	lovely; beautiful	ललित	lalita	charming; lovely; graceful	
jelma	take form; become incarnate; turn into (normally menjelma)	जन्मन्	janman	birth; origin	The Sanskrit nominative and accusative form is janma.
jempana	litter; palanquin	जम्पान	jampāna	sedan chair	
jenggala	forest; jungle	जङ्गल	jaṅgala	arid, sterile, desert	The meaning shifted from “arid land” to “forest”.
jentera	wheel; spinning wheel; mechanism or machine	यन्त्र	yantra	instrument; apparatus; machine	
jiwa	life; soul; spirit; psyche	जीव	jīva	living; life; living being; individual soul	
juta	million	अयुत	ayuta	ten thousand; myriad	The numerical value changed from ten thousand in Sanskrit to one million in Indonesian.
jutawan	millionaire; wealthy person	अयुत; -वन्त्	ayuta; -vant (masculine nominative -vān)	ten thousand; possessing or endowed with	An Indonesian formation from juta and the borrowed possessive suffix -wan, corresponding to Sanskrit -vant (masculine nominative -vān).
kaca	glass; mirror	काच	kāca	glass	
kacamata	spectacles; eyeglasses	काच	kāca	glass	An Indonesian compound of Sanskrit-derived kaca and native mata, “eye”. Only the first element is Indic.
kadru	reddish brown	कद्रु	kadru	tawny, brown, reddish-brown	
kala	time; occasion; period	काल	kāla	time; period; appointed time	
kalau	if; in case; supposing	काल	kāla	time	De Casparis treats kalau as partly Sanskrit-derived; the remaining element and the precise development are uncertain.
kali	times, expressing frequency or multiplication	काल	kāla	time; occasion	De Casparis treats this as an adapted or partly Sanskrit-derived formation. Distinct from kali, “river”.
kalpataru	tree symbolizing life and hope; Indonesian environmental award	कल्पतरु	kalpataru	wish-granting tree	Kalpataru is also the name of an Indonesian environmental award.
kama	love; passion; worldly desire; Kama, the god of love in Indian mythology	काम	kāma	wish, desire, longing; love, especially sexual love; love personified	KBBI marks the word as Sanskrit.
kapisa	having the colour of a jackal's coat	कपिश	kapiśa	ape-coloured, brown, reddish-brown	
Karkata	Cancer (zodiac sign)	कर्कट	karkaṭa	crab; the zodiacal sign Cancer	
kawi	Old Javanese; the Javanese of literature; poet, author (from Javanese)	कवि	kavi	wise, enlightened; sage, seer; poet	
kecapi	a traditional plucked string instrument with three, five, six or more strings	कच्छपी	kacchapī	a female tortoise; a kind of lute, named for its tortoise-like shape	KBBI lists the santol tree (Sandoricum koetjape) as a separate homonym.
kemboja; kamboja (variant)	frangipani (Plumeria)	काम्बोज	kāmboja	of Kamboja; a native of Kamboja; names applied to certain plants	De Casparis derives kemboja from kāmboja. Sanskrit uses the name for different plants, including Rottleria tinctoria and a kind of white Mimosa.
kanta, suryakanta	kanta: lens; suryakanta: magnifying or burning glass	कान्त; सूर्यकान्त	kānta; sūryakānta	a precious stone; sun-crystal or sunstone	De Casparis gives (sūrya)kānta as the source of kanta.
kapas	cotton; cotton plant	कर्पास	karpāsa	cotton; cotton plant	
karena	because; because of	कारण	kāraṇa	cause; reason	
karma	karma; deeds and their consequences under karmic causation	कर्मन्	karman	action; deed; work; ritual act	Sanskrit karma is the nominative, accusative and compound form of karman.
karsa	will; intention; volition	आकर्ष	ākarṣa	drawing toward oneself; attraction	De Casparis proposes ākarṣa with a question mark; the precise etymology is uncertain.
kartika	the Pleiades; stars (literary)	कृत्तिका	kṛttikā	the Pleiades	Related to Sanskrit kārttika, the name of a month associated with the Pleiades.
karunia	grace; favour; blessing; gift; compassion	कारुण्य	kāruṇya	compassion; kindness; pity	
karya	work; a created work or product	कार्य	kārya	work; task; duty; something to be done	Doublet of kerja.
kasturi; kesturi	musk; names of certain fragrant plants, including bunga kasturi	कस्तूरी	kastūrī	musk; also historical names of certain plants	The 2008 Kamus Bahasa Indonesia identifies bunga kasturi with Tapeinochilos ananassae; de Casparis describes a musk flower of the hibiscus group. These are distinct botanical uses of the name.
kata	word; utterance	कथा	kathā	speech; talk; story	
kenya	girl; woman (respectful; classical, from Javanese)	कन्या	kanyā	girl, virgin, daughter	
kermi	small intestinal worm; threadworm	कृमि	kṛmi	worm, insect	KBBI gives keremi as a variant.
kesumba	various plants yielding a red dye, such as annatto (Bixa orellana); deep red	कुसुम्भ	kusumbha	safflower (Carthamus tinctorius); saffron	The name passed from safflower to other plants used for red dye.
keti	one hundred thousand	कोटि	koṭi	ten million	The numerical value differs: Sanskrit koṭi is ten million, while Indonesian keti is one hundred thousand. Kati is a separate word denoting a unit of weight.
kelahi	quarrel; fight	कलह	kalaha	quarrel; strife; contention	
keling	historical name for a person from India, especially southern India	कालिङ्ग	kāliṅga	a person of, or something relating to, Kaliṅga	Connected with Kaliṅga, a historical region of eastern India.
keluarga	family; household; kin	कुल + वर्ग	kula + varga	family, lineage + group, class	Formation from the Sanskrit-derived elements kula and warga. See warga.
kemala; gemala; kumala	a precious or magically luminous stone, traditionally a bezoar	कमल (proposed)	kamala (proposed)	lotus; pale red	De Casparis tentatively compares kemala with Sanskrit kamala; the etymology is uncertain. Gemala and kumala are variant spellings.
kencana	gold; golden	काञ्चन	kāñcana	gold; golden	
kendi	earthenware water pitcher, usually with a spout	कुण्ड; कुण्डी	kuṇḍa; kuṇḍī	pot; pitcher; jar	Kuṇḍī is a feminine form.
kepala	head; chief	कपाल	kapāla	skull; skull-bowl	
keranda	coffin; covered bier for carrying a body	करण्ड	karaṇḍa	basket; box	
kerja	work; job; employment	कार्य	kārya	work; duty; task; something to be done	Doublet of karya.
ketika	time; moment; when	घटिका	ghaṭikā	a measure of time; a water clock	A ghaṭikā conventionally denotes one sixtieth of a day, or 24 minutes.
kian	so much; increasingly; more and more	कियत्; कियान्	kiyat; kiyān	how much? how many? how far?	Kiyān is the masculine nominative singular of kiyat.
kirana	ray; light; figuratively beautiful (literary)	किरण	kiraṇa	ray; beam of light	
kokila	myna (archaic)	कोकिल	kokila	the koel or Indian cuckoo, whose call is praised in poetry	The name was transferred from the koel to the myna.
kosakata	vocabulary	कोश + कथा	kośa + kathā	storehouse, treasury, lexicon + speech, story	Indonesian compound kosa + kata, both Sanskrit-derived, literally a store of words.
kota	city; town; historically fort or fortified enclosure	कोट	koṭa	fort; stronghold	Sanskrit also has the variant कोट्ट koṭṭa.
krida	action; activity; sport	क्रीडा	krīḍā	play; sport; amusement	
kesatria; ksatria	warrior; knight; a member of the warrior or ruling class	क्षत्रिय	kṣatriya	a member of the warrior or ruling class	
kuasa	power; authority; ability	वश	vaśa	power; control; authority	From Austronesian ka- + Sanskrit vaśa, probably through Old Javanese kawasa.
kuda	horse	घोट; घोटक	ghoṭa; ghoṭaka	horse	The World Loanword Database classifies kuda as borrowed and records both an unidentified source and Sanskrit ghoṭa. The exact immediate source and transmission remain uncertain.
kumba	pot; water jar	कुम्भ	kumbha	pot; jar	
kunarpa	carcass; corpse (archaic)	कुणप	kuṇapa	dead body, corpse	
kunci	key; lock	कुञ्चिका	kuñcikā	key	De Casparis suggests possible early Hindi mediation; the shorter form kuñci is not attested in the Sanskrit dictionaries he cites.
kumkuma; kungkuma	saffron	कुङ्कुम	kuṅkuma	saffron	
kunta	javelin; throwing spear (classical)	कुन्त	kunta	spear, lance	
kurnia	favor; grace; gift or blessing	कारुण्य	kāruṇya	compassion; pity; kindness	Variant of karunia.
kusta	leprosy	कुष्ठ	kuṣṭha	leprosy; a skin disease	
kesuma; kusuma; kasuma	flower; figuratively a beautiful or noble person (literary)	कुसुम	kusuma	flower; blossom	Literary usage.
laba	profit; gain; benefit	लाभ	lābha	obtaining, acquisition, gain, profit	
labu	gourd; squash	अलाबु	alābu	bottle gourd	The Indonesian word has a broader botanical range than Sanskrit alābu.
lagu	song; tune	लघु (proposed)	laghu (proposed)	light; short; gentle or soft, including of sound	The proposed Sanskrit connection is unestablished. The World Loanword Database classifies lagu as having no evidence for borrowing.
laksa	ten thousand	लक्ष	lakṣa	one hundred thousand; a lakh	The numerical value changed: Indonesian laksa denotes 10,000, whereas Sanskrit lakṣa denotes 100,000.
laksana	like; as; sign; characteristic; conduct (literary senses)	लक्षण	lakṣaṇa	mark; sign; characteristic; indication	
laksamana	admiral; naval commander	लक्ष्मण	lakṣmaṇa	Lakṣmaṇa, Rāma’s younger brother	The name of Rāma’s younger brother became a Malay-Indonesian naval title.
laksmi; Laksmi	beautiful (literary); Lakshmi, the goddess	लक्ष्मी	lakṣmī	beauty; good fortune; prosperity; Lakṣmī, goddess of fortune and prosperity	The Indonesian adjective and the divine name are distinct uses; Sanskrit lakṣmī is a noun.
lata	creeping; crawling; a creeper or crawling creature (literary)	लता	latā	creeper; climbing plant; vine	The Indonesian crawling sense extends beyond the Sanskrit botanical meaning.
lawang	cinnamon; certain spice-related plant products, including nutmeg aril	लवङ्ग	lavaṅga	clove	The direction of borrowing is disputed. De Casparis, following Gonda, considers an Austronesian source for Sanskrit lavaṅga plausible. The separate Indonesian/Javanese sense “door” is unrelated to this botanical comparison.
lela	graceful or elegant movement; elegant (literary)	लीला	līlā	play; sport; grace; elegance	Distinct from the homonym lela “small cannon”.
lena	sleeping soundly; oblivious; absorbed	लीन (proposed)	līna (proposed)	resting; absorbed; dissolved; vanished	The derivation from līna is uncertain. De Casparis also proposes Prakrit or Pali lena, corresponding to Sanskrit layana “lying down”.
lencana	badge; emblem; insignia	लाञ्छन	lāñchana	mark; sign; emblem	
lepa	mortar; plaster	लेप	lepa	smearing, plastering; ointment, plaster	This is the first of several homonyms in KBBI.
lingga	linga; an upright stone emblem, especially of Śiva	लिङ्ग	liṅga	mark; sign; emblem; the phallic emblem of Śiva	
loba	greedy; avaricious	लोभ	lobha	greed; covetousness	The Sanskrit noun became an Indonesian adjective.
loka	world; place; realm	लोक	loka	world; region; place	
madu	honey; co-wife	मधु	madhu	honey; something sweet; a sweet drink	The honey sense corresponds to Sanskrit madhu. De Casparis also lists “co-wife”, but its semantic history is unclear; the 2008 Indonesian dictionary treats the two senses as homonyms.
madia; madya	middle; intermediate	मध्य	madhya	middle; central; intermediate	
maha-	great; very; supreme (combining form)	महा-	mahā-	great (compound form of mahat)	Sanskrit mahā- is the form of mahat used in compounds.
Mahadewa	supreme god; Śiva	महादेव	mahādeva	great god; an epithet of Śiva	
Mahadewi	great goddess; Durgā; queen or royal lady in historical use	महादेवी	mahādevī	great goddess; principal queen; an epithet of Pārvatī/Durgā	
Maha Esa	the one and only; uniquely one (of God)	महेश (proposed)	maheśa (proposed)	great lord; an epithet of Śiva	Loan-Words in Indonesian and Malay relates mahaésa to Sanskrit maheśa; de Casparis analyzes mahā- + īśa. This proposed historical derivation is distinct from the modern Indonesian interpretation maha + esa, expressing divine oneness.
mahaguru	professor; great teacher	महागुरु	mahāguru	a highly venerable person; literally great teacher	Guru besar is the more usual Indonesian term for professor.
maharaja	great king; emperor; supreme ruler	महाराज	mahārāja	great king; sovereign	
maharani	queen; empress; queen consort	महाराज्ञी	mahārājñī	great queen; chief queen; queen consort	Compare rani.
mahasiswa	university or college student, regardless of gender	महा- + शिष्य	mahā- + śiṣya	great + pupil, student	Modern Indonesian compound maha- + siswa, both Sanskrit-derived.
mahasiswi	female university or college student	महा- + शिष्य	mahā- + śiṣya	great + pupil, student	Indonesian feminine counterpart of mahasiswa, with the feminine ending -i; the forms shown are its underlying Sanskrit-derived components.
mahesa; mahisa	buffalo (literary)	महिष	mahiṣa	buffalo	
mahkota	crown	मकुट; मुकुट	makuṭa; mukuṭa	crown; diadem	De Casparis and Loan-Words in Indonesian and Malay give makuṭa; mukuṭa is also an attested Sanskrit form.
makara	makara, a mythical creature of fearsome appearance used as a decorative motif on ancient temples and statues (archaeology); Capricorn (zodiac sign)	मकर	makara	a kind of sea monster; the tenth sign of the zodiac, Capricorn	KBBI capitalises the zodiac sense as Makara.
mala	dirt; stain; impurity; misfortune in compounds	मल	mala	dirt; impurity; stain	
malai	string of flowers or grains; garland of flowers or jewels; panicle	माल्य	mālya	wreath, garland, chaplet; flower	Shastri records a Penang form male, from Tamil.
malaka	Indian gooseberry tree (Phyllanthus emblica), whose wood is made into charcoal and whose sour fruit is pickled	आमलक	āmalaka	emblic myrobalan (Phyllanthus emblica); its fruit	KBBI also lists the form kemlaka. Shastri derives the place name Melaka (Malacca) from the same Sanskrit word.
malapetaka	calamity; disaster	मल + पातक	mala + pātaka	stain, impurity + sin, wrongdoing	Formation from mala + pātaka; the calamity sense belongs to the Indonesian compound.
manakala	when; whenever	काल	kāla	time	Indonesian compound mana + kala; only kala is Sanskrit-derived.
mandala	territory of a religious institution; circle, region (classical); area, as in mandala wisata “tourist area”; a diagram painted on cloth or drawn on the ground in coloured rice, used for concentration in meditation	मण्डल	maṇḍala	circular; disk; circle, ring; district, territory, province	The meditation diagram is listed in KBBI as a separate homonym.
manggala	introductory praise; an author's opening or closing words in a work; eldest child; spiritual protector, leader, commander; senior instructor	मङ्गल	maṅgala	happiness, welfare; anything auspicious, such as a prayer, benediction or good omen	The literary sense reflects the custom of opening a work with an auspicious invocation.
mangsa	prey; figuratively, victim	मांस	māṃsa	flesh, meat	The meaning shifted from “flesh” to “prey”.
mangsi	ink; charcoal powder for blackening the teeth (archaic)	मषि	maṣi	powder, especially black powder for the eyes; soot, lampblack, ink	
mani	semen; seminal fluid	मणि (proposed)	maṇi (proposed)	jewel; pearl; also the glans penis	Origin disputed: Loan-Words in Indonesian and Malay gives Sanskrit maṇi, Arabic maniyy, or Tamil maṉi as alternatives. De Casparis tentatively proposes a semantic connection through Tantric usage.
manik	bead; jewel	மணி (Tamil); मणि (Sanskrit comparison)	maṇi	bead; gem; jewel	Loan-Words in Indonesian and Malay gives Tamil மணி maṇi as the immediate source; Sanskrit maṇi is a comparison.
mantra; mantera	incantation; spell; sacred formula	मन्त्र	mantra	sacred utterance; hymn; incantation; formula	
manusia	human being; humankind	मनुष्य	manuṣya	human; human being	
mara	calamity; danger	मार	māra	killing, destroying; death, pestilence; obstacle	KBBI lists mara “to come forward, advance” as a separate homonym.
marcapada	the visible world, the place of living beings; earth	मर्त्य + पद	martya + pada	mortal; the world of mortals + step; place, abode	Shastri gives the Sanskrit compound as martyapada.
marga	road; way (literary)	मार्ग	mārga	path; road; way	This etymology concerns the road or way sense.
masa	time; period; era	मास	māsa	month	Semantic broadening from “month” to “time” or “period”.
matra	dimension; measure; metre or rhythmic pattern	मात्रा	mātrā	measure; quantity; a metrical unit	
maya	illusory; unreal; virtual	माया	māyā	illusion; magic; appearance	The Sanskrit noun became an Indonesian adjective.
mega	cloud	मेघ	megha	cloud (literally “sprinkler”)	Unrelated to the prefix mega- “large; million”.
melati	jasmine (Jasminum sambac); rank insignia of middle-ranking officers in the armed forces and police	मालती	mālatī	Jasminum grandiflorum and its fragrant white flowers	
menteri	minister	मन्त्रिन्	mantrin	counsellor; minister	The Sanskrit nominative singular is मन्त्री mantrī.
merdeka	free; independent	महर्द्धिक	maharddhika	very prosperous; wealthy; powerful	Sanskrit maharddhika is formed from mahā + ṛddhi + -ka. Indonesian kemerdekaan is the corresponding noun “freedom” or “independence”.
merdu	sweet-sounding; melodious	मृदु	mṛdu	soft; gentle; tender	
merica	black pepper	मरिच; मरीच	marica; marīca	black pepper	
merpati	pigeon; dove; figuratively, a young couple in love	पारावत; पारापत	pārāvata; pārāpata	turtle-dove, pigeon; pārāpata is recorded as a variant of pārāvata	WOLD gives the variant pārāpata.
meru	Meru, the mountain at the centre of the universe in Hindu mythology; a triangular ornamental motif; a temple shrine with three to eleven tiered roofs, in Bali; the tiered roof of a Balinese temple building (from Balinese)	मेरु	meru	a fabulous mountain at the centre of the world in Hindu cosmology; a particular kind of temple	
Mesa	Aries (zodiac sign)	मेष	meṣa	ram, sheep; the zodiacal sign Aries	
mesra	thoroughly blended, deeply ingrained; intimate, close, affectionate	मिश्र	miśra	mixed, mingled, blended, combined	
meta	drunk; raging, running wild, especially of an elephant (classical)	मत्त	matta	excited, drunk, intoxicated; in rut, as an elephant; furious, mad	Unrelated to the prefix meta-. Shastri lists the word under manta (from matta) and under mada “rut”.
meterai	seal; stamp; revenue stamp	मुद्रा	mudrā	seal or instrument for sealing; the impression made by a seal	
mina	fish; Pisces (zodiac sign)	मीन	mīna	fish; the zodiacal sign Pisces	KBBI lists the fish and zodiac senses as separate homonyms, alongside unrelated words spelt mina.
mitra	partner; colleague; friend	मित्र	mitra	friend; companion	
moksa	liberation from worldly bonds; release from rebirth (Hinduism)	मोक्ष	mokṣa	emancipation, liberation; release from worldly existence or transmigration	
mudah	easy	मूढ (proposed)	mūḍha (proposed)	foolish; bewildered; deluded	The proposed connection with Sanskrit mūḍha is unestablished; the origin of mudah is uncertain.
muka	face; front	मुख	mukha	mouth; face; front	
mula	beginning; origin	मूल	mūla	root; origin; beginning	
mulia	noble; honourable; precious	मूल्य	mūlya	worth; value; price	
murka	very angry	मूर्ख	mūrkha	stupid, foolish, dull; a fool	The meaning shifted from “foolish” to “wrathful”.
mustaka	head; tip, top (from Javanese)	मस्तक	mastaka	head, skull; the upper part of anything, top, summit	
nada	pitch, tone; figuratively, tone of voice, mood, attitude	नाद	nāda	loud sound, roaring; any sound or tone	
nadi	artery; blood vessel; pulse	नाडी	nāḍī	tube; vein; artery; pulse	
naga	dragon; great mythical serpent; nāga	नाग	nāga	snake, especially cobra; a nāga (serpent being)	
nama	name	नामन्	nāman	name	Sanskrit nāman has the nominative and accusative singular form nāma.
nara	person	नर	nara	man, male, person; hero	
nawa- (bound form)	nine (combining form)	नव	nava	nine	Nava is the combining form of the numeral navan.
nayaka	minister (classical)	नायक	nāyaka	guide, leader, chief, lord; general	
negara	country; state	नगर	nagara	town; city	
negeri	land; country; homeland; state or government (as opposed to private)	नगरी	nagarī	town; city (feminine noun)	Compare negara.
neraca	balance; weighing scales; balance sheet	नाराच; नाराची	nārāca; nārācī	nārāca: arrow; name of a metre; nārācī: goldsmith’s balance	De Casparis cites nārāca; Monier-Williams records the balance sense under the feminine form nārācī.
neraka	hell	नरक	naraka	hell; place of torment	
netra	eye	नेत्र	netra	leader, guide; the eye, as the guiding organ	
niaga	trade; commerce	वाणिज्य	vāṇijya	traffic, trade, commerce, merchandise	
nidera	sound sleep; drowsiness (classical)	निद्रा	nidrā	sleep, slumber, sleepiness	
nila	indigo plant (Indigofera); indigo dye; blue	नील	nīla	dark-coloured, especially dark blue or black; dyed with indigo; sapphire	The archaic sense “sapphire” is listed in KBBI as a separate homonym.
nira	sweet sap tapped from the flower stalks of sugar palms and coconut palms	नीर	nīra	water; juice, liquor	
nirwana	nirvana; liberation from rebirth; figuratively, perfect peace or bliss	निर्वाण	nirvāṇa	extinction; release or final emancipation	
niscaya	certainly; surely; inevitably	निश्चय	niścaya	ascertainment, conviction, certainty; resolution	Shastri lists the Malay form nescaya.
niskala	incorporeal; immaterial; abstract	निष्कल	niṣkala	without parts; undivided	
nista	despicable, base; offensive (of words); disgrace (colloquial)	कनिष्ठ	kaniṣṭha	youngest; smallest, lowest, least	The derivation from kaniṣṭha follows WOLD. Shastri instead proposes aniṣṭa “undesired, evil”.
nyata	clear; evident; real; proven	नियत	niyata	fixed; established; certain; definite	
padma	lotus (Nelumbo nucifera); the parasitic plant Rafflesia patma, with a large reddish-brown flower	पद्म	padma	lotus, especially the flower of the sacred lotus	Shastri lists the form padema.
paduka	honorific for a ruler or distinguished person; Your/His/Her Highness; footwear, shoe or sandal (classical)	पादुका	pādukā	shoe or sandal; also an impression of a deity’s or holy person’s feet	The honorific developed through respectful reference to a ruler’s sandals or feet.
pahala	reward for good deeds; religious merit	फल	phala	fruit; result; consequence; reward	From the same Sanskrit word as pala.
paksa	force; compulsion; to compel (memaksa)	पक्ष	pakṣa	wing; side; party or faction	
pala	nutmeg; the nutmeg tree (Myristica fragrans)	फल	phala	fruit; nut; nutmeg	The Sanskrit word also specifically denotes nutmeg. Compare pahala.
panca- (bound form)	five (combining form)	पञ्च	pañca	five	
papa	poor, destitute; miserable; sinful (Hinduism)	पाप	pāpa	bad, vicious, wicked, evil, wretched	Unrelated to colloquial papa “father”.
paramita	the teaching on the noble virtues, made up of the six and the ten perfections (Buddhism)	पारमिता	pāramitā	complete attainment, perfection; transcendental virtue such as generosity, morality, patience, energy, meditation and wisdom	
pariwisata	tourism	—	—	Uncertain	Modern Indonesian coinage, conventionally analyzed as pari- + wisata. Its exact Sanskrit prototype is uncertain; de Casparis tentatively suggests pravāsita “sent abroad”.
parwa	a section of an Old Javanese literary work, such as the Adiparwa and Wirataparwa of the Mahabharata	पर्वन्	parvan	knot, joint; a division or section, especially of a book	
pasca-	post-, after (combining form), as in pascapanen “post-harvest” and pascasarjana “postgraduate”	पश्च; पश्चात्	paśca; paścāt	paśca (only as the first member of compounds): hinder, later; paścāt: afterwards, later; after	
patih, -pati	patih: vizier, chief minister, or deputy regent; -pati: lord, master	पति	pati	master; lord; owner; husband	The title is associated with Sanskrit pati. The adjective patih “obedient, submissive” is a separate homonym. Compare bupati.
pawana	wind (classical)	पवन	pavana	purifier; wind, the god of wind, breeze, air	WOLD gives pāvana “purifying”.
pekerti	character; conduct; disposition (especially in budi pekerti)	प्रकृति	prakṛti	nature; constitution; character	
pelana	saddle; the handles of a pommel horse (gymnastics)	पल्याण	palyāṇa	saddle	
pendapa, pendopo	open pavilion or hall, especially at the front of a Javanese house	मण्डप	maṇḍapa	open hall; pavilion	Through Javanese pendhapa.
pendeta	religious teacher or leader; Hindu priest; Protestant minister	पण्डित	paṇḍita	learned; skilled; scholar; learned teacher	
penjara	prison	पञ्जर	pañjara	cage	
percaya	believe; trust	प्रत्यय	pratyaya	belief; conviction; trust	
perdana	first; inaugural; chief (in perdana menteri)	प्रधान	pradhāna	chief; principal; first	
periksa	to look at carefully, examine (base of memeriksa)	परीक्षा	parīkṣā	inspection, investigation, examination, test	
peristiwa	event; occurrence, especially a notable one	प्रस्ताव	prastāva	introduction, prelude; introducing a topic; occasion, opportunity	
perkara	matter; affair; issue; legal case	प्रकार	prakāra	kind; sort; manner	
perkasa	strong; mighty; valiant	प्रकाश	prakāśa	shining; manifest; renowned	
perkosa	force; violence; rape (memerkosa or memperkosa)	वश	vaśa	power; control; authority	De Casparis proposes per- + kuasa, possibly through Javanese, with kuasa ultimately from Sanskrit vaśa combined with native ka-.
perpustakaan	library; collection of books	पुस्तक	pustaka	book; manuscript	Formed in Indonesian from pustaka with the circumfix per-…-an.
persada	raised platform or seat of a ruler; pleasure garden; building, palace (classical); persada tanah air: homeland	प्रासाद	prāsāda	lofty seat or platform; palace, temple	
pertama	first	प्रथम	prathama	first	
pertiwi	earth; Mother Earth; motherland	पृथ्वी; पृथिवी	pṛthvī; pṛthivī	earth; the earth goddess	
perwara	ladies-in-waiting of a king or queen (classical); a small subsidiary temple in a temple complex	परिवार	parivāra	surroundings, train, suite, dependants, followers	KBBI lists the temple sense as a separate homonym.
perwira	commissioned military officer; valiant or heroic (classical)	प्रवीर	pravīra	pre-eminent hero; distinguished warrior; chief	
peta	map	पट	paṭa	woven cloth; a painted piece of cloth, a picture	The sense moved from a painted cloth to a picture or plan and then to a map.
petola	a climbing gourd, Luffa cylindrica, eaten as a vegetable; kain petola (kain pitola in KBBI), a flowered silk cloth	पटोल	paṭola	the pointed gourd (Trichosanthes dioica); its fruit; a kind of cloth	Both Indonesian senses, a gourd and a cloth, correspond to senses of the Sanskrit word, though the gourd species differ.
pidana	crime, criminal (as in perkara pidana “criminal case”); penalty, as in pidana denda “fine” (law)	पीडन	pīḍana	pressing, afflicting; oppressing, paining, harassing	
pitam	dizzy from blood rushing to the head; pitam otak: stroke (apoplexy)	पित्त	pitta	bile, the bilious humour, one of the three humours of Indian medicine	
pra- (bound form)	pre-; before (prefix)	प्र	pra-	before; forward; in front; forth	
prabu	king; royal title (classical)	प्रभु	prabhu	master; lord; king	
prakarya	handicrafts; practical school work	प्र + कार्य	pra- + kārya	before + work or task (components)	Formed in Indonesian from pra- + karya, both Sanskrit-derived elements.
praja	kingdom; state; city	प्रजा	prajā	offspring; people; subjects	
prasasti	inscribed charter, especially one on stone or copper	प्रशस्ति	praśasti	praise, fame, glorification; edict; eulogistic inscription	
prasawya	religious rite performed by walking round anticlockwise	प्रसव्य	prasavya	turned towards the left; contrary, reverse (the opposite of pradakṣiṇa)	
prayitna	on guard; alert; ready (from Javanese)	प्रयत्न	prayatna	persevering effort, exertion; great care, caution	
pria	man; adult male	प्रिय	priya	dear; beloved; a lover or husband	
puasa	fasting; a fast	उपवास	upavāsa	fasting; religious abstinence	Possibly through a Middle Indo-Aryan intermediary.
puja	worship; homage; adoration	पूजा	pūjā	worship; reverence; honour	
puji	praise; to praise (memuji)	पूजा	pūjā	worship; reverence; honour	Related to puja through adaptation within Malay/Indonesian.
punia	sincere gift; alms (Hinduism)	पुण्य	puṇya	good, virtuous, meritorious; virtue, good work, religious merit	
pura	Hindu temple; city (especially in place names)	पुर	pura	fortified town; city; enclosure	The temple sense developed locally; the city sense survives especially in place names.
purba	ancient; primeval	पूर्व	pūrva	prior; former; ancient	
puri	palace; room or building within a palace	पुरी	purī	town; fortress; castle; sanctuary	Compare pura.
purna- (bound form)	complete; finished (also used as a combining form)	पूर्ण	pūrṇa	full; complete; finished	See also sempurna and purnama.
purnama	full moon; a lunar month	पूर्णमा	pūrṇamā	full-moon day	
purusa	kinship through the male line; person, human being (classical)	पुरुष	puruṣa	man, male, human being; person; member of a race or generation	
pustaka	book; manuscript (literary)	पुस्तक	pustaka	book; manuscript	
puspa	flower (literary)	पुष्प	puṣpa	flower	
putra; putera (variant)	son; prince; male (in institutional or sports usage)	पुत्र	putra	son	
putri; puteri (variant)	daughter; princess; female (in institutional or sports usage)	पुत्री	putrī	daughter	
raga	body	राग	rāga	colour; passion; affection; beauty	Through Javanese; the sense “body” developed in Old Javanese.
rahasia	secret	रहस्य	rahasya	secret; mystery	
rahu	a giant with only a head, believed to swallow the sun or moon and so cause eclipses (classical)	राहु	rāhu	“the seizer”, a demon who seizes the sun and moon and causes eclipses	
raja	king; ruler	राजन्	rājan	king	The Sanskrit stem is rājan, with nominative singular rājā and compound form rāja-.
rajalela	act arbitrarily; become rampant; spread unchecked (usually merajalela)	राजन् + लीला	rājan + līlā	king + play or sport	Analyzed by de Casparis as a compound of Sanskrit-derived rāja- and līlā; its semantic development is uncertain.
raksasa	giant; ogre; very large (figuratively)	राक्षस	rākṣasa	rākṣasa; demon or ogre	
rana	war; battlefield (archaic)	रण	raṇa	delight, pleasure; battle, war, combat	KBBI also lists rana as a classical variant of ratna “jewel”, which is a different word.
randa, rangda	widow; divorced woman	रण्डा	raṇḍā	widow	Rangda is a variant of randa. Compare janda.
rani	queen; queen consort	राज्ञी; राणी	rājñī; rāṇī	queen	Through an Indic vernacular form rāṇī, ultimately from Sanskrit rājñī.
rasa	taste; sensation; feeling; emotion	रस	rasa	taste; flavour; sap or essence; sentiment	
rasi	sign of the zodiac; astrology	राशि	rāśi	heap, mass, group; a sign of the zodiac, an astrological house	Shastri lists the form raksi.
ratna	jewel; gemstone (literary)	रत्न	ratna	jewel; gem	
reka	to compose or design (base of mereka); to devise; to imagine	रेखा	rekhā	scratch, streak, line; outline, drawing, sketch	The verb mereka “to devise” is unrelated to the pronoun mereka “they”.
rencana	plan; draft; programme; article; story (classical)	रचना	racanā	making, arranging, preparing, composing; arrangement; a literary composition	
renjana	strong emotion such as longing, love or passion	रञ्जन	rañjana	colouring, dyeing; pleasing, charming, delighting	
resi	ascetic, hermit; holy man (classical)	ऋषि	ṛṣi	a singer of sacred hymns, an inspired poet or sage	KBBI lists unrelated homonyms, including resi “receipt”.
roma	fine body hair, in bulu roma	रोमन्	roman	hair on the body, especially short hair, bristles, down	KBBI treats the word under bulu roma; roma “face” is a separate homonym.
rupa	form; appearance; look	रूप	rūpa	form; outward appearance; likeness	
saba	to go out of the house (from Javanese); bersaba: to mix socially, to visit (classical)	सभा	sabhā	assembly, meeting; society; assembly hall	
sabda	word or utterance, especially of a deity, prophet, or ruler	शब्द	śabda	sound; word; speech	
sadu	excellent; most noble (classical); an Indian holy ascetic	साधु	sādhu	good; excellent; virtuous; a holy man	
sahaya	servant; slave; I (classical humble pronoun)	सहाय	sahāya	companion; helper; assistant	Related to the first-person pronoun saya.
saki	friend; companion (classical)	सखि	sakhi	friend, companion	
saksi	witness	साक्षिन्	sākṣin	witness	Sanskrit sākṣin has the nominative singular form sākṣī.
sakti	supernaturally powerful; possessing magical power	शक्ति	śakti	power; ability; energy	The Sanskrit noun became an adjective in Indonesian.
sama	same; equal	सम	sama	same; equal; level	Disputed origin: the World Loanword Database treats sama as a Sanskrit loan; the Austronesian Comparative Dictionary reconstructs *sama and questions borrowing because of its widespread Austronesian cognates, including Oceanic forms.
samapta	ready and alert; on standby	समाप्त	samāpta	completely obtained, concluded, completed; perfect	The sense “ready, on standby” developed from “completed”.
samudra	ocean	समुद्र	samudra	ocean	
sandi	secret; code; cipher	संधि	saṃdhi	joining; connection; union; junction	
sandiwara	drama; theatrical performance; (figuratively) a pretence	—	—	—	Etymology uncertain. De Casparis tentatively connects the first element with Sanskrit saṃdhi; the second element is unidentified.
sangha	Buddhist monastic community	संघ	saṃgha	association; community; Buddhist monastic order	Sanskrit/Pali term; the immediate borrowing route is uncertain. Distinct from sangga “support”.
sangka	to suppose, guess (base of menyangka); doubt, suspicion	शङ्का	śaṅkā	apprehension, distrust, suspicion; doubt, uncertainty; supposition	KBBI lists sangka “conch shell” as a separate homonym; Shastri derives that word from śaṅkha.
Sanskerta	Sanskrit, the classical literary language of ancient India	संस्कृत	saṃskṛta	put together, perfected; refined, polished, applied to the elaborated language as opposed to the vernaculars	
sapta- (bound form)	seven	सप्त	sapta	seven	Sanskrit sapta is used in compounds; the numeral stem is saptan.
sarana	means; tool, instrument; medium; requirement, condition	शरण	śaraṇa	protecting, guarding; shelter, refuge, protection	The sense moved from “refuge, protection” to “means”.
sari	essence; gist, summary; pollen; flower (classical)	सार	sāra	core, pith; strength; essence, best part	KBBI lists the classical sense “flower” as a separate homonym; sari “sari (garment)” is a different word.
sarira	body (literary or regional)	शरीर	śarīra	body	Through Javanese sarira “body”.
sasana	training hall; arena; (also) instruction or advice	शासन	śāsana	instruction; teaching; command; rule	The “training hall” sense is an Indonesian semantic development.
sasi	moon; month (from Javanese)	शशिन्	śaśin	the moon (literally “containing a hare”)	
sastra	literature; literary or learned writings	शास्त्र	śāstra	teaching; treatise; manual; authoritative scripture	
satwa	animal; animals; fauna	सत्त्व	sattva	living or sentient being; creature; existence	
saudara	sibling; relative; fellow member of a group; you (polite form of address)	सोदर	sodara	born from the same womb; a full brother	Shastri also gives sahodara.
sayembara	competition with a prize	स्वयंवर	svayaṃvara	self-choice; the choosing of a husband by a princess at a public assembly of suitors	The sense moved from a contest among suitors to a prize competition.
sederhana	simple; modest; unpretentious	साधारण	sādhāraṇa	common; ordinary; shared	
sedia	ready; prepared; available	सज्ज	sajja	fixed, prepared, equipped, ready	This is the second KBBI homonym; KBBI lists sedia “original, former” separately.
segara	sea, ocean (classical)	सागर	sāgara	the ocean	
segera	immediately; quickly; in haste	शीघ्र	śīghra	quick, speedy, swift, rapid	
seka	wipe; rub clean or dry	निषेक	niṣeka	sprinkling; infusion; water for washing	Proposed Sanskrit etymology; the relationship between niṣeka and Indonesian seka is uncertain.
sela	stone	शैल	śaila	made of stone, stony, rocky; rock, crag, mountain	This is the second KBBI homonym, distinct from sela “gap” and sela “saddle”. WOLD gives Javanese séla, a high-register form, as the immediate source; Shastri gives śilā “stone”.
selasih	sweet basil (Ocimum basilicum)	तुलसी	tulasī	holy basil, a shrub venerated by Vaiṣṇavas	The name passed from holy basil to sweet basil.
selesma	common cold with a runny nose; nasal mucus	श्लेष्मन्	śleṣman	phlegm, mucus, the phlegmatic humour	
seloka	a verse form, usually of four lines rhyming aaaa, conveying a lesson or satire	श्लोक	śloka	sound; fame, praise; a stanza, especially the common epic metre	
semadi; samadi	meditation; contemplation	समाधि	samādhi	concentration; deep meditation	Samadi is a variant of semadi.
semenda	kinship by marriage; adat semenda: customary rules of matrilineal (mamak–kemenakan) kinship	सम्बन्ध	sambandha	binding together, connection; connection by marriage, relationship; a relative, kinsman	
semesta	whole; entire; universal	समस्त	samasta	combined; whole; all	
sempena	blessing; good fortune (classical)	सम्पन्न	sampanna	turned out well, accomplished, perfect; endowed with	KBBI lists sempena “dream” separately; Shastri derives that word from svapna.
sempurna	perfect; complete	सम्पूर्ण	sampūrṇa	full; complete; entire	
semua	all; every	समूह	samūha	collection, assemblage, multitude; sum, totality	
senantiasa	always; continually	नित्यशस्	nityaśas	always, constantly, eternally	The variant sentiasa is also used.
sendawa	saltpetre (potassium nitrate), used in making gunpowder	सैन्धव	saindhava	from the Indus or Sindh; rock salt from Sindh, any salt	
sengkela	shackle for the legs of a large animal such as an elephant or buffalo; fetter; stocks	शृङ्खल	śṛṅkhala	chain, fetter, especially for the feet of an elephant	
sengketa	dispute; quarrel; conflict; lawsuit	संकेत	saṃketa	agreement, compact, appointment; convention; signal	The meaning shifted from “agreement” to “dispute”.
sengsara	suffering; misery; miserable	संसार	saṃsāra	worldly existence; the cycle of rebirth	The Indonesian meaning developed from the Sanskrit concept of worldly existence and rebirth.
senjata	weapon; arms	संयत्त	saṃyatta	prepared; ready; on guard; come into conflict	
senapati; senopati (variant)	military commander; general (classical)	सेनापति	senāpati	commander of an army	Senopati is a Javanese-associated variant. Sanskrit senā “army” + pati “lord; master”.
sentana	relatives of a ruler; nobility (from Javanese)	संतान	saṃtāna	continued succession; lineage, family, offspring	
sentosa	free from hardship; safe and peaceful; prosperous	संतोष	saṃtoṣa	satisfaction, contentedness	
serakah	greedy; avaricious	—	—	—	Sanskrit origin uncertain; the proposed etymon śraka “greedy” is unestablished.
serapah	curse; oath	शाप	śāpa	curse, malediction, imprecation	
serati	elephant herder or driver; mahout	सारथि	sārathi	charioteer, driver; leader, guide	KBBI lists the duck breed itik serati as a separate homonym.
serba	all; every; all kinds of	सर्व	sarva	all; every; whole	
serigala	jackal; wild dog	सृगाल	sṛgāla	jackal	
seroja	sacred lotus (Nelumbo nucifera)	सरोज	saroja	lotus (literally “lake-born”)	
seru	call; shout; a loud cry	श्रु	śru	to hear; listen	Proposed Sanskrit etymology; the borrowing relationship is uncertain.
seteru	enemy; adversary	शत्रु	śatru	enemy; foe	
setia	loyal; faithful; true	सत्य	satya	true; truthful; faithful	
setra	field; open ground; place where corpses are disposed of or buried	क्षेत्र	kṣetra	land, soil; field; place, region	KBBI marks the word as Sanskrit.
siksa	suffering inflicted as punishment; torture (base of menyiksa)	शिक्षा	śikṣā	learning, study; teaching, training; chastisement, punishment	Of the Sanskrit senses, “chastisement” is the one that survived.
sila	moral principle; ethical conduct; courtesy	शील	śīla	character; conduct; custom; moral precept	The ethical sense is distinct from the dictionary homonym sila “sit cross-legged”.
singa	lion	सिंह	siṃha	lion; (figuratively) a hero or eminent person	
singgasana	throne	सिंहासन	siṃhāsana	lion-seat; royal throne	Sanskrit siṃha “lion” + āsana “seat”.
sirna	vanished; gone without a trace	शीर्ण	śīrṇa	broken, shattered; fallen away; withered, decayed	
siswa	pupil; school student	शिष्य	śiṣya	pupil; disciple; student	Compare mahasiswa “university student”.
sita	pure white (classical)	सित	sita	white, pale, bright; pure	This is the second KBBI homonym; the common word sita “seizure, confiscation” is listed separately.
sri	honorific title, especially for royalty or a distinguished person	श्री	śrī	splendour; prosperity; auspiciousness; an honorific	
stamba	monumental pillar with religious tenets inscribed at its base	स्तम्भ	stambha	post, pillar, column	
stupa	Buddhist stupa; relic monument	स्तूप	stūpa	mound; heap; Buddhist relic monument	
suaka	refuge; asylum; sanctuary	सेवक	sevaka	servant; attendant; follower	Shastri derives suaka from sevaka.
suami	husband	स्वामिन्	svāmin	master; lord; husband	The Sanskrit nominative singular is svāmī (स्वामी).
suara	sound; voice	स्वर	svara	sound; voice; tone; musical note	
suci	clean; pure; holy	शुचि	śuci	clean; pure; bright; holy	
Sudra	the lowest caste in Hindu society	शूद्र	śūdra	a Śūdra, a member of the fourth and lowest of the four classes	
suka	to like; happy; pleased	सुख	sukha	pleasant; happy; happiness; ease	
sukma	soul; spirit	सूक्ष्म	sūkṣma	subtle; minute; fine	The Indonesian “soul; spirit” sense developed from Sanskrit “subtle”.
sula	pointed iron bar, as used for husking coconuts; sharpened stake used for impalement	शूल	śūla	sharp iron pin, stake, spit; spear; a stake for impaling criminals	
sunyi	quiet; silent; deserted; empty	शून्य	śūnya	empty; void; deserted; zero	
suralaya	abode of the gods; heaven (classical)	सुरालय	surālaya	abode of the gods, heaven; temple	
surga	heaven	स्वर्ग	svarga	heaven	
surya	sun (literary); solar in compounds	सूर्य	sūrya	sun; the Sun deity Sūrya	
susila	virtuous; decent; well-mannered; morality	सुशील	suśīla	of good character; well-behaved	
sutra	silk	सूत्र	sūtra	thread, yarn, string, cord	The variant sutera is also used.
swa- (bound form)	self-; own; by oneself (bound form)	स्व	sva-	one’s own; self	A productive Indonesian combining form.
swastika	swastika, a cross with arms bent at right angles, used as a symbol of the universe or the sun; a religious symbol of Balinese Hinduism; the Nazi emblem	स्वस्तिक	svastika	any auspicious object, especially a mystical cross or mark made to denote good luck	
tala	tuning, harmony of pitch (music); a tuning device, as in garpu tala “tuning fork”	ताल	tāla	palmyra palm; clapping the hands; musical time or measure	KBBI lists tala “base, layer” as a separate homonym.
tapa	ascetic practice; austerity; meditation	तपस्	tapas	heat; religious austerity; ascetic practice	De Casparis gives tapas as the source. Sanskrit also has tapa (तप), “religious austerity”.
tata	order; arrangement; to arrange	तथा	tathā	thus; in that manner	Shastri derives tata from tathā.
teja	red and yellow glow of clouds at sunset; rainbow	तेजस्	tejas	point of a flame or ray; glow, splendour, brilliance, light	KBBI lists several trees called teja as a separate homonym.
telaga	lake, especially in the mountains; pond; well; oil well (mining)	तडाग	taḍāga	pond, pool, tank	
tembaga	copper	ताम्र	tāmra	of a coppery red colour; made of copper; copper	WOLD gives Hindi-Urdu tāmbekā “coppery” as the immediate source; ultimately from Sanskrit. Monier-Williams also records tāmraka “copper”.
tenaga	energy; strength; power	—	—	—	Origin uncertain; the proposed connection with Sanskrit tānayati is unestablished.
tenggala	plough	लाङ्गल	lāṅgala	plough	
tentara	soldiers, troops; army; the military	तन्त्र	tantra	loom, warp; framework, system; an army	
terka	to guess, suppose (base of menerka)	तर्क	tarka	conjecture; reasoning, speculation; doubt	
terna	herbaceous plant, herb	तृण	tṛṇa	grass, herb, any grass-like plant; straw	
teruna	youth, young man; cadet; unmarried young man	तरुण	taruṇa	young, tender; a youth	
tingkal	borax (chemistry)	टङ्कण	ṭaṅkaṇa	borax	
tirta	water	तीर्थ	tīrtha	ford, bathing place, place of pilgrimage on a sacred stream; piece of water	KBBI marks the word as Sanskrit.
tresna	love (from Javanese)	तृष्णा	tṛṣṇā	thirst; desire, craving	The sense moved from “craving” to “love”.
tri- (bound form)	three	त्रि	tri-	three	
Tula	Libra (zodiac sign)	तुला; तुल	tulā; tula	tulā: balance, weight; tula: the sign Libra	
ubah	change; alter	—	—	—	Origin uncertain; the proposed connection with Sanskrit ubhā is unestablished. Sanskrit ubha means “both”.
udara	air; atmosphere	उदार	udāra	high; lofty; elevated; (also) rising vapour or fog	
umpama	example, comparison; like, as if (colloquial); supposition	उपमा	upamā	comparison, resemblance, similarity; simile	
unta	camel	उष्ट्र	uṣṭra	buffalo; camel	WOLD gives Hindi-Urdu ūṁṭ as the immediate source; ultimately from Sanskrit.
upacara	ceremony; formal ritual	उपचार	upacāra	service; attendance; courtesy; ceremony; ritual observance	
upanishad	Upanishad, a philosophical text expounding the Vedas (Hinduism)	उपनिषद्	upaniṣad	sitting at the feet of a teacher to listen; secret doctrine; a class of philosophical writings attached to the Brāhmaṇas	
upaya	effort; endeavour; means of achieving an aim	उपाय	upāya	approach; that by which one reaches an aim, a means or expedient	
upeti	tribute paid by a small state to a ruler or conquering power; bribe given to an official	उत्पत्ति	utpatti	arising, birth, production; profit, productiveness	Shastri also gives upastuti “invocation, praise” as a source.
usaha	effort; endeavour; business or enterprise	उत्साह	utsāha	effort; energy; perseverance; determination	
usia	age; length of life	आयुष्य	āyuṣya	life; longevity; duration of life	De Casparis gives āyuṣya as the source.
utama	main; foremost; most important; best	उत्तम	uttama	highest; uppermost; foremost; best	
utara	north	उत्तर	uttara	northern; north; upper; subsequent	
wacana	discourse; speech; conversation; coherent spoken or written text	वचन	vacana	speech; utterance; statement	Includes both spoken and written discourse.
wadah	container; receptacle; (figuratively) an organization or forum	—	—	—	Compare Javanese wadhah and Sundanese wadah. A proposed deeper connection with Sanskrit ādhāra “support; receptacle” is uncertain.
wahana	vehicle; conveyance; medium; means to an end	वाहन	vāhana	vehicle; conveyance; the act of carrying	
Waisak	Vesak, the Buddhist festival marking the birth, enlightenment and death of the Buddha	वैशाख	vaiśākha	one of the twelve months of the Hindu lunar year, corresponding to April–May	The festival takes its name from the month in which it falls.
waisya	the third caste in Hinduism: traders, farmers and artisans	वैश्य	vaiśya	a settler on the soil, a peasant; a member of the third class, occupied with trade and agriculture	
wana	forest (literary)	वन	vana	forest; wood	
wangsa	dynasty; lineage; royal house	वंश	vaṃśa	lineage; family; dynasty; bamboo	
wanita	woman; adult woman; lady	वनिता	vanitā	woman; wife	
waras	healthy; recovered; mentally sound; sane	—	—	—	Origin uncertain; the proposed connection with Sanskrit vara “best; excellent” is unestablished.
warga	member of a family, community, or other group; (archaic) social rank/class	वर्ग	varga	group; class; category; division	
warna	colour	वर्ण	varṇa	colour; appearance; class	
warta	news; report	वार्त्ता	vārttā	news; report; account	Sneddon derives warta and berita from vārttā; de Casparis instead gives vṛtta “event”.
wastra	traditional cloth whose colours, size and material carry their own meaning and symbolism, such as batik, tenun and songket (fashion)	वस्त्र	vastra	cloth, clothes, garment	KBBI marks the word as Sanskrit.
Weda	the Vedas, the oldest scriptures of Hinduism	वेद	veda	knowledge, sacred knowledge; the Vedas	
wibawa	authority; influence; power	विभव	vibhava	power; might; wealth; prosperity	
widyaiswara	instructor; especially a government-service trainer	विद्या + ईश्वर	vidyā + īśvara	knowledge/learning + lord/master	An Indonesian formation from Sanskrit elements. The conventional Sanskrit compound would be vidyeśvara.
wihara	Buddhist monastery or temple	विहार	vihāra	Buddhist or Jain monastery; monastic residence	Compare biara.
wimana	vehicle; chariot	विमान	vimāna	chariot of the gods, a self-moving aerial car; any car or vehicle	KBBI marks the word as Sanskrit.
wira	hero; brave or heroic (classical/combining use)	वीर	vīra	hero; brave; heroic	
wisesa	supreme ruler; supreme power	विशेष	viśeṣa	distinction; excellence; superiority	
wisma	building used as a residence, office and the like; housing complex	वेश्मन्	veśman	house, dwelling, mansion; palace	
Wisnu	Vishnu, the preserver among the three gods of the Trimurti (Hinduism)	विष्णु	viṣṇu	one of the principal Hindu deities, regarded as the preserver	
wiweka	very careful, prudent; prudence (archaic)	विवेक	viveka	discrimination, distinction; discretion, right judgement	
wreda	old; aged; senior; experienced	वृद्ध	vṛddha	old; aged; grown; experienced; wise	
Wrisaba	Taurus (zodiac sign)	वृषभ	vṛṣabha	bull; the zodiacal sign Taurus	
yaksa	yaksha, a celestial being that guards wealth and fertility (archaeology)	यक्ष	yakṣa	a class of semi-divine beings, attendants of Kubera	
yasti	the pole-like finial at the top of a stupa (archaeology)	यष्टि	yaṣṭi	staff, stick, rod; pole, pillar; flagstaff	
yoga	yoga; a system of spiritual discipline and related exercises	योग	yoga	yoking; union; disciplined spiritual practice	
yoni	the Buddhist teaching on the modes of birth: from a womb, from an egg, from moisture, and spontaneous (Buddhism)	योनि	yoni	womb; place of birth, origin; the form of existence fixed by birth	
yuda; yudha (name/variant)	war; battle (classical/literary)	युद्ध	yuddha	war; battle; fighting	Yudha occurs in names and Javanese-associated spellings.
yuwana	young; children	यौवन	yauvana	youth, youthfulness; a number of young people	
