= Thoroughfare =

Transportation route connecting one location to another

A thoroughfare is a primary passage or way of transport, whether by road on dry land or, by extension, via watercraft or aircraft. Originally, the word referred to a main road or open street which was frequented thoroughly.

== Different terms ==
- Road, route or way on land between two places that has been paved or otherwise improved for travel; including many different types of road
- Airway, designated route for aircraft
- Boardwalk
- Boulevard, particularly in North American usage
- Bridle path, for equestrian use
- Canopy walkway
- Cycleway, for use by cyclists
- Footpath, for use only by pedestrians
- Foreshoreway, a greenway along the edge of the sea, open to both walkers and cyclists
- Greenway, a wilderness area intended for "passive use"
- Highway, depending on jurisdiction, anything from a path (England) to a road restricted to fast motor vehicles
- Hiking trail, trails (footpaths), in the countryside
- Long-distance trail, recreational trail of exceptional length (between 50 km and 1,000 km or more) mainly through rural areas used for hiking, backpacking, cycling, horse riding or cross-country skiing
- Parkway, a landscaped thoroughfare
- Pend
- Running course, a footway used by runners
- Shared path, open to both pedestrians and cyclists
- Sidewalk, a path for people to walk along the side of a road
- Strait or channel, a heavily trafficked water route
- Street, a public thoroughfare in a built environment
- Stroad, a thoroughfare that combines the features of streets and roads
- Towpath, a path along a canal or river originally used for towing a boat
- Trail/track, a rough path through more wild or remote territory
- Tunnel, an underground passage created for traffic
- Walkway
- Waterway, a navigable body of water

== See also ==
- Right of way (disambiguation) (has many meanings, some of which make it synonymous with thoroughfare but with stricter legal definitions)
- Way (disambiguation)
