= List of loanwords in Thai =

The Thai language has many borrowed words from mainly Sanskrit, Tamil, Pali and some Prakrit, Khmer, Portuguese, Dutch, certain Chinese dialects and more recently, Arabic (in particular many Islamic terms) and English (in particular many scientific and technological terms). Some examples as follows:

Word	Romanization	English translation	From Language	Word
อักษร	àk-sɔ̌ɔn	alphabetic letter, key	Sanskrit	अक्षर/akṣara
องุ่น	a-ngùn	grape	Persian	انگور/angur
อุษา	u-sǎa	dawn, morning	Sanskrit	उषा/uṣā
ภาษา	paa-să	language	Sanskrit	भाषा/bhāṣā
ชา	chā	tea	Chinese	茶
ภัย	pai	danger	Sanskrit, Pali	भय/bhaya
บัส	bát	bus	English	bus
ไวโอลิน	wai-o-lin	violin	English	violin
อพาร์ทเมนต์	a-páat-mén	Apartment	English	
เทวี	tee-wii	Goddess	Sanskrit, Pali	देवी/devī
ฑีฆายุ	tii-kaa-yú	"long live"	Sanskrit	दीर्घायु/dīrghāyu
ครู	kruu	teacher	Sanskrit, Pali	गुरु/guru
เคาน์เตอร์	káu-dtɤ̂	"counter" or "desk"	English	
กบาล	ga-baan	head, skull	Sanskrit, Pali	कपाल/kapāla
คอมพิวเตอร์	kom-phiw-tɤ̂	computer	English	
มหา-	ma-hǎa-	great	Sanskrit, Pali	महा/mahā
มนุษย์	ma-nút	human being	Sanskrit	मनुष्य/manuṣya
มัสยิด	mát-sa-yít	mosque	Arabic	مسجد/masjid
หมี่	mìi	noodles	Hokkien	麵 mī
นรก	na-rók	hell	Sanskrit, Pali	नरक/naraka
ราสเบอร์รี่	ráat-bɤɤ-rîi	raspberry	English	
ราชา	raa-chaa	king	Sanskrit, Pali	राजा/rājā
รส	rót	taste	Sanskrit, Pali	रस/rasa
รูป	rûp	picture	Sanskrit, Pali	रूप/rūpa
สบู่	sa-bùu	soap	Portuguese	sabão
เซ็กซ์	sék	sex	English	
สมบูรณ์	sǒm-buun	perfect, complete	Sanskrit	संपूर्ण/saṃpūrṇa สมฺปูรฺณ ← สํปูรฺณ (from สํ + ปูรฺณ) = complete(d) - cf. "purnama"
ศัตรู	sàt-dtruu	adversary, enemy	Sanskrit	शत्रु/śatru
สิงห์	sǐng	lion	Sanskrit, Pali	सिंह/siṃha
โชเฟอร์ (dialectal)	choo-fɤ̂	driver	French	chauffeur
สวรรค์	sa-wǎn	heaven	Sanskrit	स्वर्ग/svarga
สุข	sùk	happiness	Sanskrit, Pali	सुख/sukha
สุริยะ	sù-ri-yá	sun	Pali	Suriya สูริยา (Sanskrit: सूर्य/sūrya)
เต้าหู้	dtâu-hûu	beancurd	Hokkien	豆腐/tao-hu
แท็กซี่	tɛ́k-sîi	taxi	English	
ทีวี	tii-wii	television	English	TV
อุดร	u-dɔɔn	north	Sanskrit, Pali	उत्तर/uttara
ยีราฟ	yii-ráap	giraffe	English	
ประถม	bpra-tǒm	primary	Sanskrit	प्रथम/prathama
คช	ka-chá	elephant	Sanskrit, Pali	गज/gaja
ประเทศ	bpra-têet	country	Sanskrit	प्रदेश/pradeśa
นคร	ná-kɔɔn	city	Sanskrit, Pali	नगर/nagara
สันติ	sǎn-dtì	peace	Pali	sānti สานฺติ (Sanskrit: शान्ति/śānti ศานฺติ)
ชัย	chai	victory	Sanskrit, Pali	जय/jaya ชย
ภูมิ	puum	soil	Sanskrit, Pali	भूमि/bhūmi
วาจา	waa-jaa	words	Sanskrit, Pali	वाचा/vācā
ภาวะ	paa-wá	condition	Sanskrit, Pali	भाव/bhāva ภาว
กษัตริย์	ga-sàt	king	Sanskrit	क्षत्रिय/kṣatriya กฺษตฺริย
ภักดี	pák-dii	loyal	Sanskrit	भक्ति/bhakti ภกฺติ
วิจารณ์	wí-jaan	review	Sanskrit	विचार्ण/vicārṇa วิจารฺณ
พายุ	paa-yú	storm	Sanskrit, Pali	वायु/vāyu วายุ
ปีศาจ	bpii-sàat	devil, ghost	Sanskrit	पिशाच/piśāca
สัตว์	sàt	animal	Sanskrit	सत्व/satva สตฺว
พินาศ	pí-nâat	destruction	Sanskrit	विनाश/vināśa วินาศ
ภูเขา	puu-kǎu	mountain	compound	ภู + เขา
วิหาร	wí-hǎan	temple	Sanskrit, Pali	विहार/vihāra วิหาร
เวลา	wee-laa	time	Sanskrit, Pali	वेला/velā เวลา
อาสา	aa-sǎa	hope(desire)	Sanskrit	आशा/āśā
กระดาษ	gra-dàat	paper	Arabic	قرطاس/qirṭās
เภตรา	pee-dtraa	boat	Sanskrit	वहित्र/vahitra
อากาศ	aa-gàat	air	Sanskrit	आकाश/ākāśa
เทศ	têet	outlandish	Sanskrit	देश/deśa
ทุกข์	túk	suffering	Sanskrit	दुःख/duḥkha
โทษ	tôot	blame	Sanskrit	दोष/doṣa
จิตร	jìt	design	Sanskrit	चित्र/citra
ทุน	tun	fund	Sanskrit	धन/dhana
จันทร์	jan	moon	Sanskrit	चन्द्र/candra
จักรวาล	jàk-gra-waan	universe	Sanskrit	चक्रवाल/cakravāla
คุณ	kun	you, useful	Sanskrit	गुण/ghuṇa
สตรี	sa-dtrii	woman	Sanskrit	स्त्री/strī
อาคาร	aa-kaan	building	Sanskrit	आगार/āgāra
ปราสาท	bpraa-sàat	castle	Sanskrit	प्रासाद/prāsāda
นาม	naam	name	Sanskrit	नाम/nāma
ชีวะ	chii-wá	living	Sanskrit	जीव/jīva
กระจก	gra-jòk	mirror, glass	Sanskrit	काचक/kācaka
กรุณา	ga-rú-naa	please, compassion	Sanskrit	करुण/karuṇa
พยัญชนะ	pa-yan-cha-ná	consonant	Sanskrit	व्यंचन/vyañcana
พิเศษ	pí-sèet	special	Sanskrit	विशेष/viśeṣa
พุทธิ	pút-tí	intelligence	Sanskrit	बुद्धि/buddhi
เหตุการณ์	hèet-gaan	events	Sanskrit, Pali	हेतु/hetu + कारण/kāraṇa
หิมะ	hì-má	snow	Sanskrit	हिम/hima
เมฆ	mêek	cloud	Sanskrit	मेघ/megha
ตรีศูล	dtrii-sǔun	trident	Sanskrit	त्रिशूल/triśūla
วิทยา	wít-ta-yaa	science	Sanskrit	विद्या/vidyā = "knowledge"
สัปดาห์	sàp-daa	week	Sanskrit	सप्ताह/saptāha
บริษัท	bɔɔ-ri-sàt	company	Sanskrit	परिषद्/pariṣad
บุรุษ	bu-rùt	man	Sanskrit	पुरुष/puruṣa
สมาคม	sa-maa-kom	association	Sanskrit	समागम/samāgama
สงคราม	sǒng-kraam	war, battle	Sanskrit	संग्राम/saṃgrāma
ชีวิต	chii-wít	life	Sanskrit	जीवित/jīvita
อาหาร	aa-hǎan	food	Sanskrit	आहार/āhāra
ไวยากรณ์	wai-yaa-gɔɔn	grammar	Sanskrit	व्याकरण/vyākaraṇa
พาณิชย์	paa-nít	commerce	Sanskrit	वाणिज्य/vāṇijya
หนอง	nɔ̌ɔng	pus	Chinese	膿
อ่าว	àaw	bay	Chinese	澳
อาน	aan	saddle	Chinese	鞍

== Notes ==
There are some Thai words which are transcribed into equivalent characters of Thai language e.g. format ฟอร์แมท (f-ฟ o-อ r-ร m-ม a-แ t-ต), lesbian เลสเบียน (l-ล e-เ s-ส b-บ ia-เอีย n-น) etc. These words are transcribed with rules made by the Royal Institute.

Thai also has a heavily influenced form of colloquial English spoken by some in Thailand (Tinglish). However, it's not a language used between locals, it is only used with tourists.
