= Sanskriti =

Sanskriti is a Sanskrit word for "culture." It may refer to:

- Sanskriti Kendra Museum, New Delhi
- Sanskriti Museum & Art Gallery, Hazaribagh
- Sanskriti Museums, a set of three museums housed within Sanskriti Kendra complex at Anandagram, an artist village complex on the outskirts of Delhi
- Sanskriti School, a recognized integrated co-educational school in the diplomatic area of Chanakyapuri, New Delhi
- Sanskriti School, Pune, a day school established in 2005
- Sanskriti The Gurukul, a boarding school on the outskirts of Guwahati, in the Indian state of Assam
- Sanskriti, publication of the Bangladeshi Ganotantrik Biplobi Jote political group
