= Types of road =

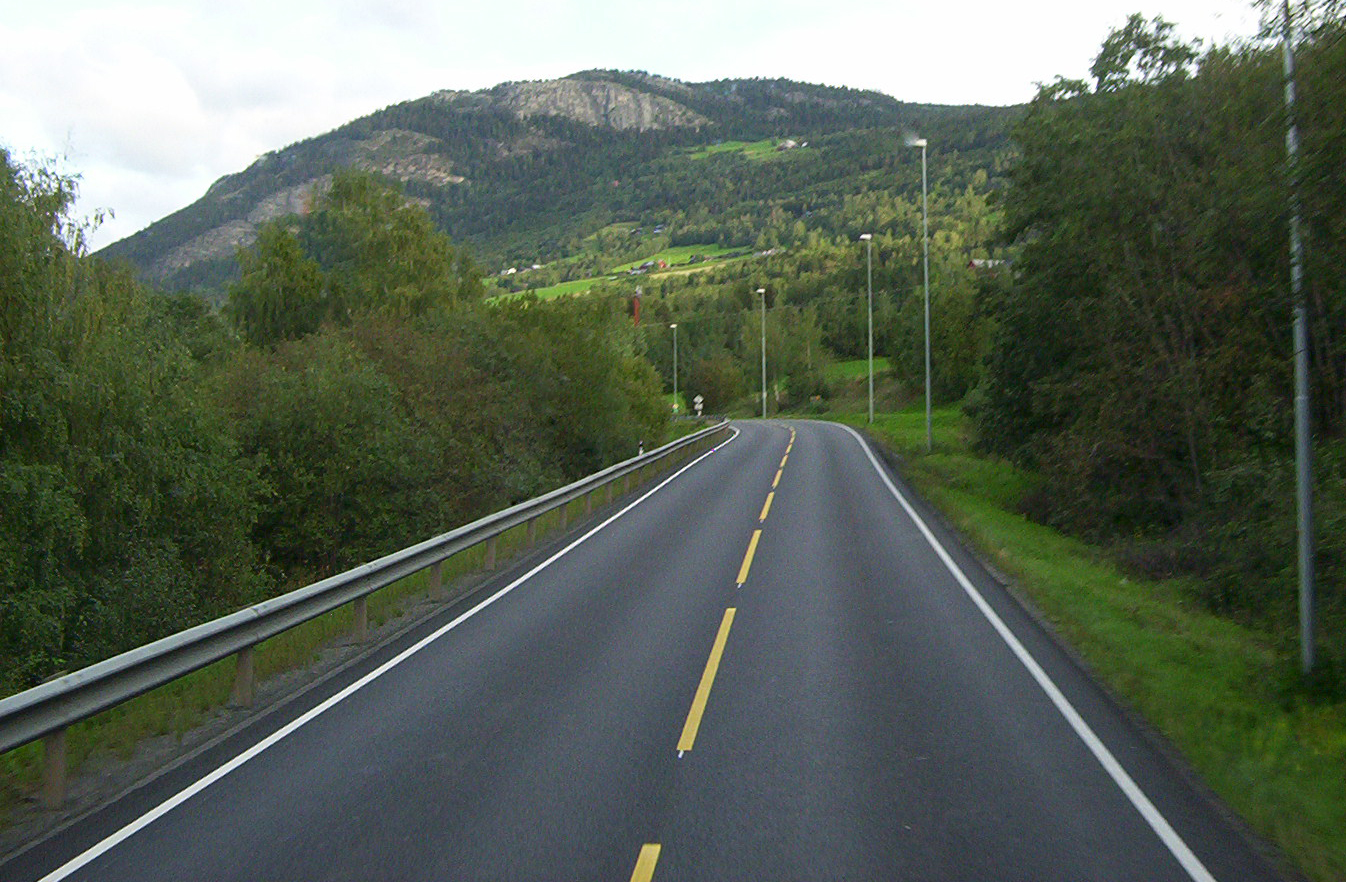
Asphalt road in Norway

A road is a thoroughfare, route, or way on land between two places that has been surfaced or otherwise improved to allow travel by foot or some form of conveyance, including a motor vehicle, cart, bicycle, or horse. Roads have been adapted to a large range of structures and types in order to achieve a common goal of transportation under a large and wide range of conditions. The specific purpose, mode of transport, material and location of a road determine the characteristics it must have in order to maximize its usefulness. Following is one classification scheme.

== Taxonomy of Road ==
Marohn distinguishes between roads that are designed for mobility which he terms "roads" and those that function to "build a place", build community wealth and provide access to land. He argues the value of a road in terms of both community wealth and mobility is maximised when the road speed is either low or high, but not at midpoints such as 45mph. He refers to this low-value midpoint of speed and land access as a stroad.

== Types of roads ==
=== Lower capacity roads ===
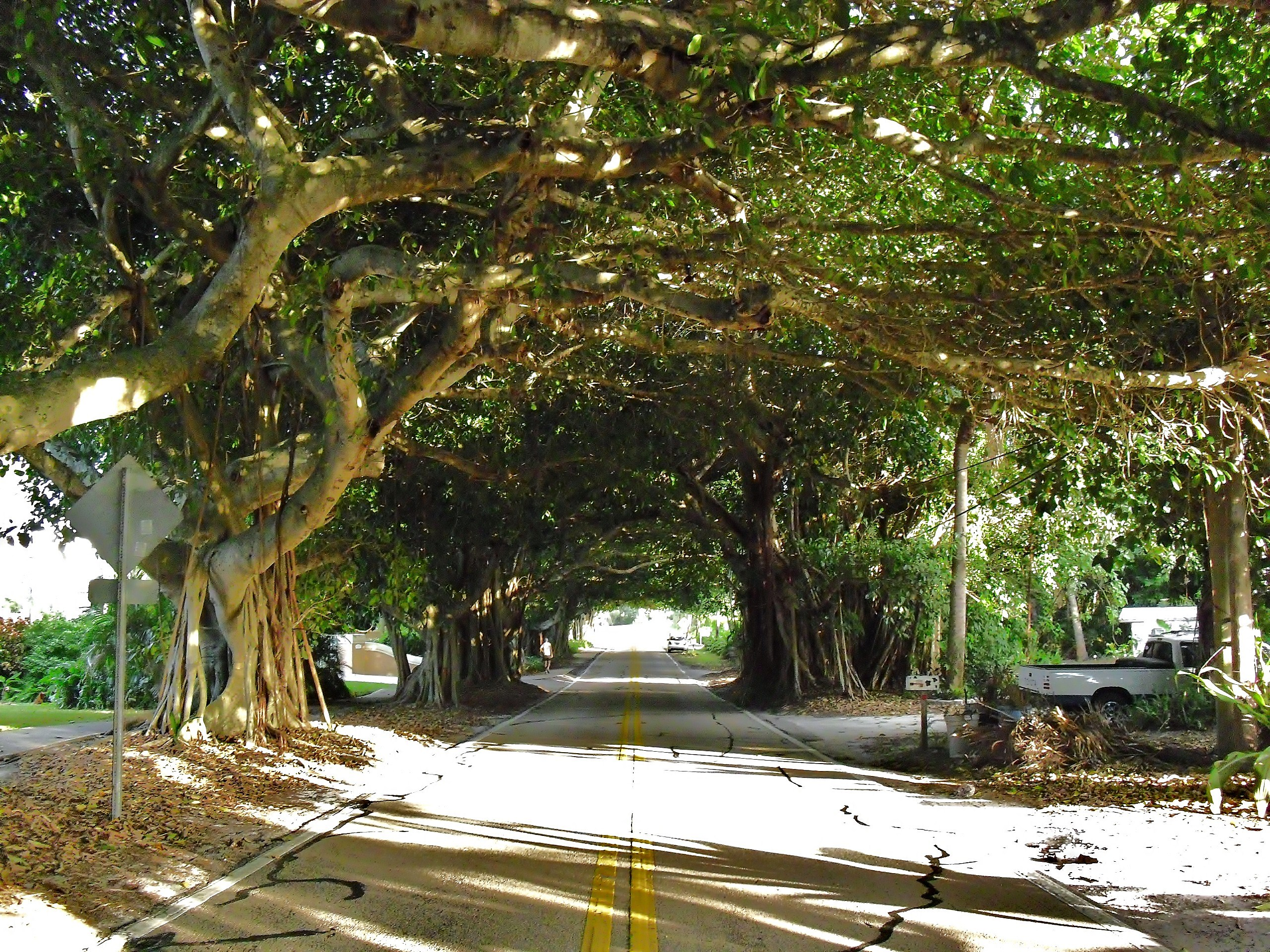
Tree tunnel in Florida

- Alley
- Street
- Avenue
- B road (disambiguation)
- Brick Road
- Boulevard
- Bundesstraße
- Byway
- Bypass road
- Beltway
- Causeway
- Collector road
- Corniche
- Close
- Crescent
- Court
- Cul-de-sac / Dead end (street)
- Drive
- Frontage road
- Gemeindestraße
- Highway
- Kreisstraße
- Lane
- Landesstraße
- Living street
- Loop
- One-way street
- Path (disambiguation)
- Place
- Plaza
- Road
- Roundabout (Also see intersecting roadways)
- Route
- Side road
- Single carriageway
- Stravenue
- Terrace
- Traffic circle
- Tree tunnel
- Way
- Woonerf

==== Primitive roads ====
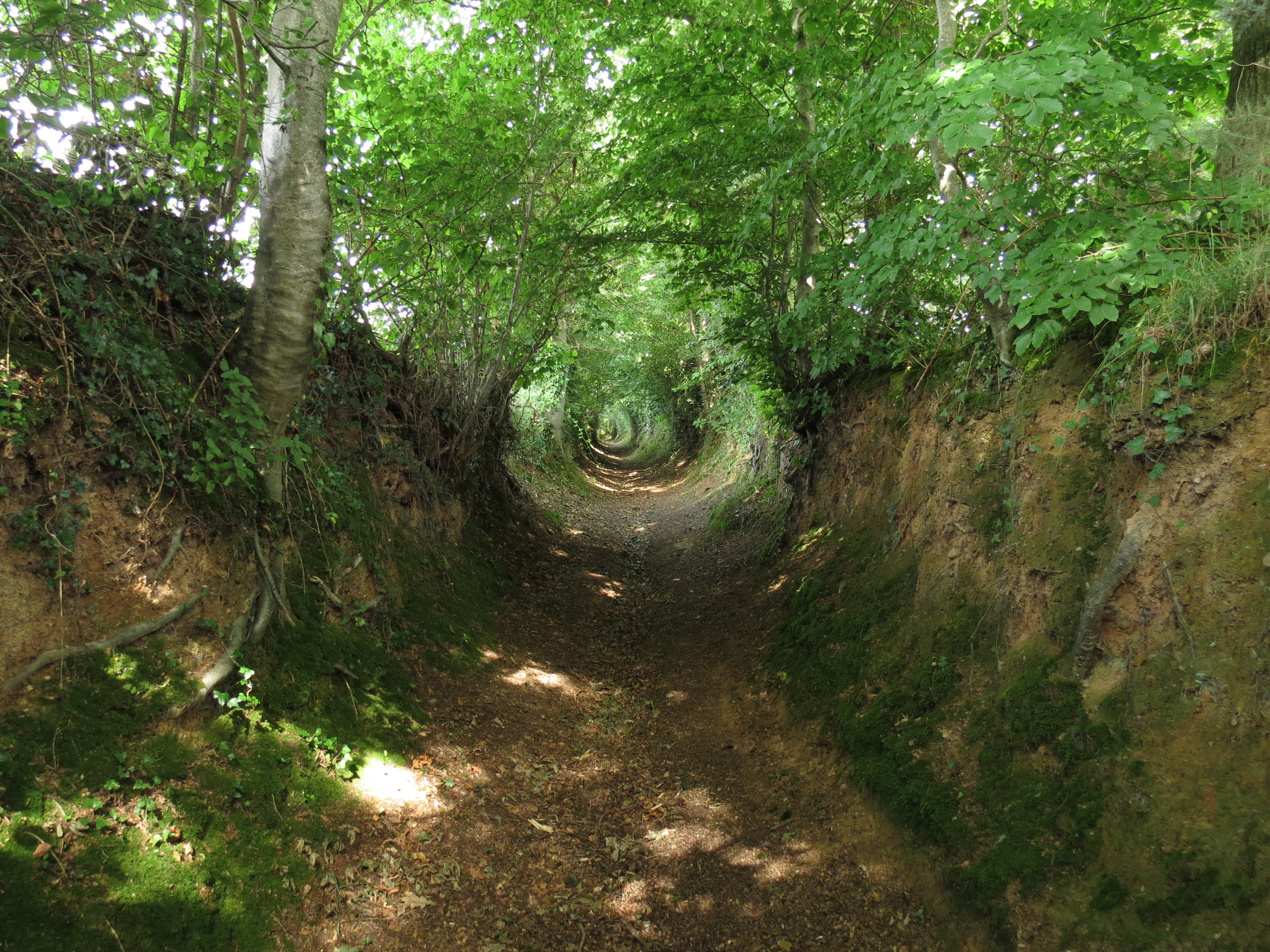
Hollow way on the side of La Meauffe, witness of the battle of the hedges in 1944)

- Agricultural road
- Backroad
- Dirt road
- Forest road
- Gravel road
- Green lane
- Historic roads and trails
- Ice road
- Roman roads
- Sunken lane

=== Large roads ===
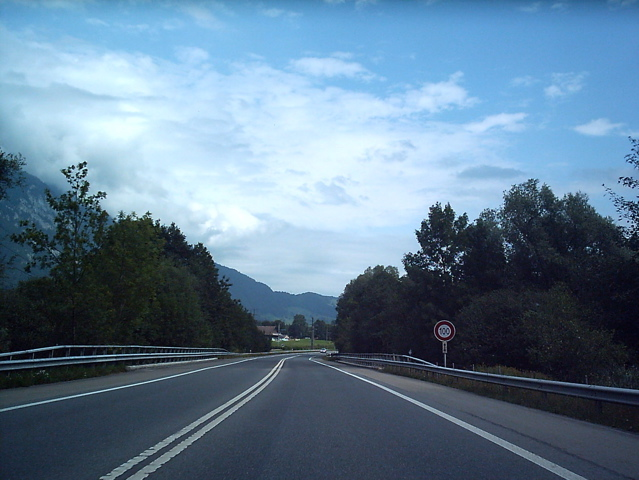
The A8 Autostrasse in Switzerland.

==== Higher capacity roads ====
Sometimes with medians.

- 2+1 road
- 2+2 road
- Arterial road
- Autostrasse
- Dual carriageway
- Local-express lanes
- Farm to Market Road
- Parkway
- Beltway
- Reversible lane
- Trunk road
- Turnpike

==== Expressways ====
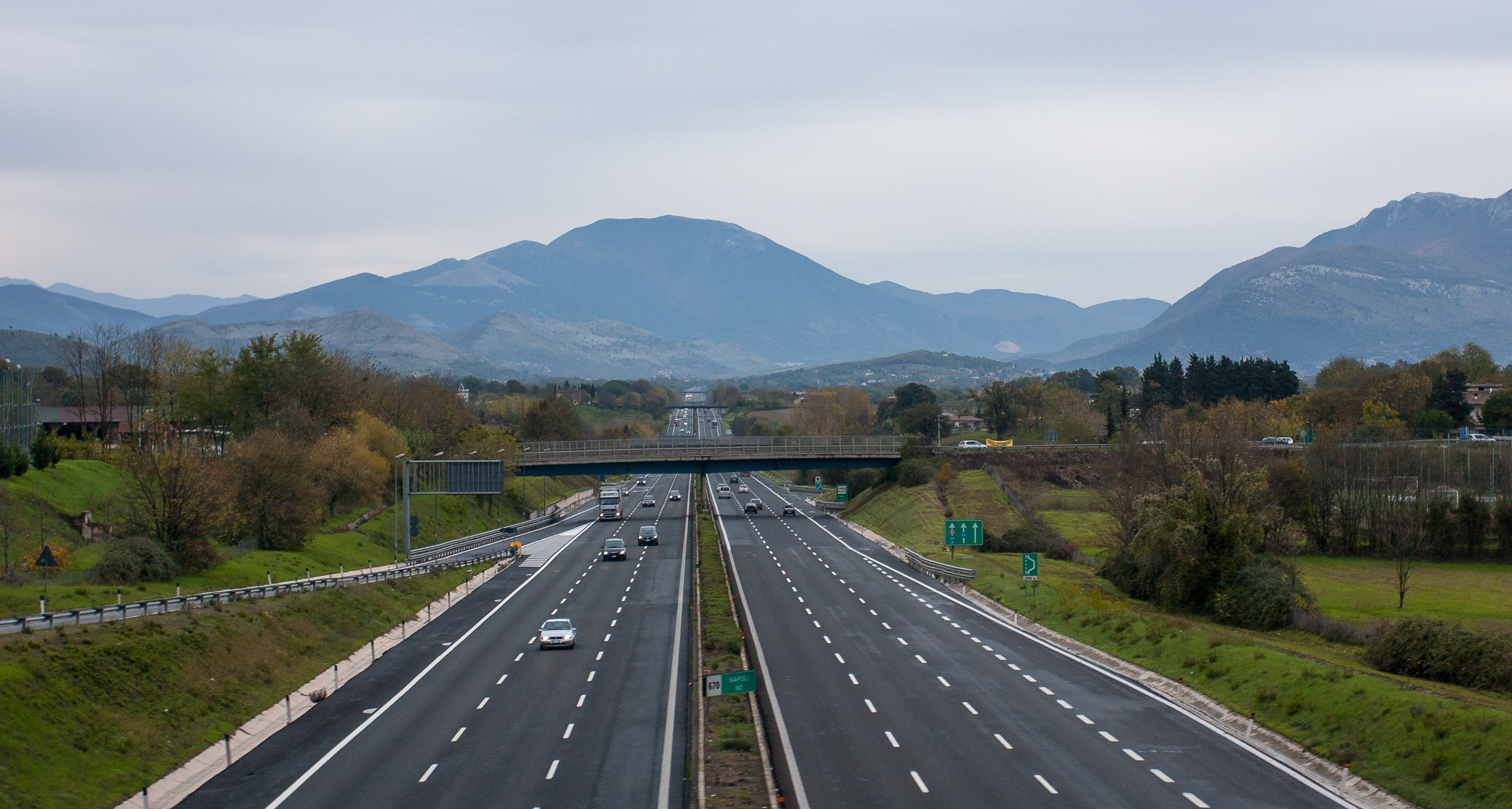
Autostrada A1 in Italy

The term expressway includes limited-access roads and grade-separated highways.

- Controlled-access highway
  - Autobahn
  - Auto-estrada
  - Autopista
  - Autostrada
  - Freeway
  - Interstate Highway
  - Motorway
- Limited-access road
  - High-quality dual carriageway (HQDC)
- Super two

=== Private roads ===
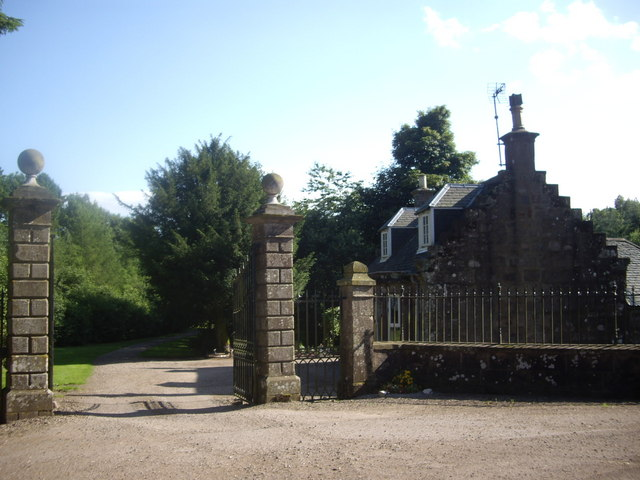
Glenbervie House driveway

- Driveway
- Gated community
- Military road
- Private highway
- Private road

=== Intersecting roads ===
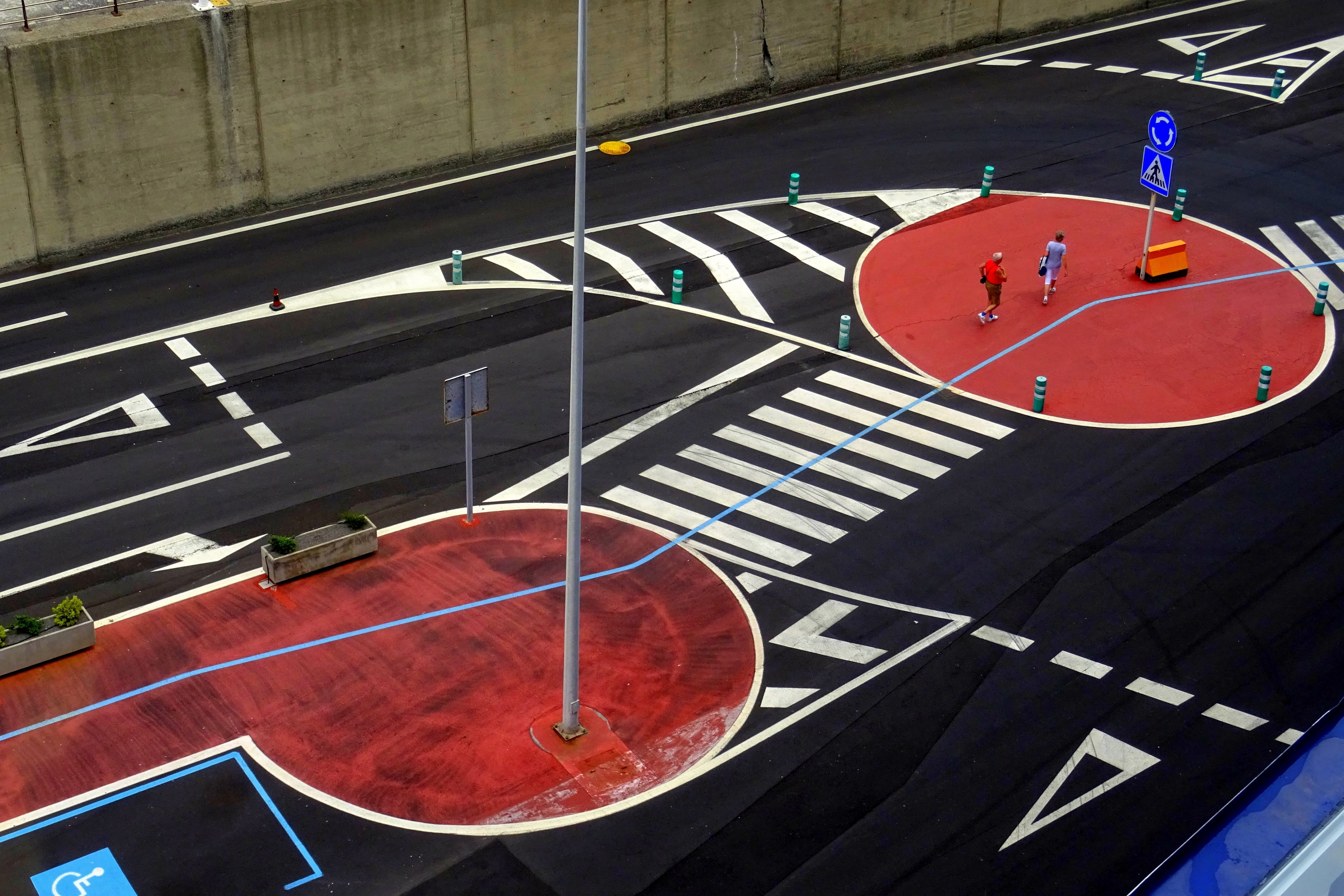
Roundabout

- Connector
- Interchange
- Intersection
- Level junction
- Level crossing
- Road diet
- Roundabout

=== Material type ===
Roads also may be classified based on their pavement material types. For instance, the Long-Term Pavement Performance database includes more than 30 types of pavement types for roads in the US and Canada. However, a more generic classification of roads based on material type is as follows.

- Concrete roads
- Asphalt roads
- Gravel roads
- Earthen roads
- Murrum roads
- Kankar roads
- Bituminous roads

=== Other thoroughfares ===
- Bascule bridge
- Bus lane
- Canal
- Carpool lane
- Cycle track
- Cycling infrastructure
- Flight deck
- Footpath (also pedestrian way, walking trail, nature trail)
- Free-market roads
- National roads
- (Native American) Indian route
- Paper street
- Pend
- Race track
- Runway
- Stroad
- Shunpike
- Wildlife crossing

== Road types by features ==
In this list, roads names are used in different areas and the features of the roads varies. So this table address the differences in that usage when needed.

Name	Country	subdivision	Access type	Speed	Cross traffic	Divided	Notes
2+1 road	Ireland			High	No	Yes	
2+1 road	North America			High	No	Optional	
2+1 road	Sweden		Junction (roundabout)	High	No	Yes	
2+2 road				High	No	Yes	Type of dual carriageway
Alley			Uncontrolled	Low	Yes	No	
Arterial road				High	No	Optional	
Autobahn	Germany		Interchange	High	No	Yes	
Autocesta			Interchange	High	No	Yes	
Autopista			Interchange	High	No	Yes	
Autoroute			Interchange	High	No	Yes	
Autoroute	Canada		Interchange	High	No	Yes	expressway is synonymous with freeway or autoroute depending on the province
Autostrada	Italy		Interchange	High	No	Yes	
Autostrasse			Interchange	High	No	Yes	
Autoestrada	Portugal		Interchange	High	No	Yes	
Avtomagistral (variously translated)	Russia			High		Yes	Designated so according to the communication importance; features vary
Boulevard			Uncontrolled	Low	Yes	No	
Business route			Uncontrolled	Low	Yes	No	
Collector/distributor road				High	No	Optional	
Cul-de-sac			Uncontrolled	Low	Yes	No	
Distributor road				High	No	Optional	
Divided highway				High	No	Optional	
Driveway			Uncontrolled	Low	Yes	Optional	
Dual carriageway	Ireland		intersection	High	Yes	Yes	
Dual carriageway	Singapore		intersection	High	Yes	Yes	
Dual carriageway	UK		Uncontrolled	Any	Yes	Yes	
Express-collector				High	No	Optional	
Expressway			Partial	Varies	Limited	Varies	General definition
Expressway	US		Partial	Varies	Limited	Yes	General US definition
Expressway	Canada		Interchange	High	No	Yes	expressway is synonymous with freeway or autoroute depending on the province
Farm-to-market road	US	Texas		High	No		usually a state highway or county highway
Freeway	US		Interchange	High	No	Yes	
Freeway	Canada		Interchange	High	No	Yes	expressway is synonymous with freeway or autoroute depending on the province
Frontage road	Argentina		Partial	Low	Yes	No	
Frontage road	China		Partial	Low	Yes	No	know locally as service roads or auxiliary roads
Frontage road	US		Uncontrolled or Partial	Low	Yes	No	Can be one way roads with opposing directions on either side of the adjoining freeway
High-quality dual carriageway			Interchange	High	No	Yes	
Highway				High	No	Optional	
Lane			Uncontrolled	Low	Yes	No	
Link road				High	No	Optional	
Motorway			Interchange	High	No	Yes	
Parkway				High	No	Optional	
Provincial road	Italy		Uncontrolled	Low	Yes	No	
Provincial road	Netherlands		Uncontrolled	Low	Yes	No	
Provincial road	South Africa		Uncontrolled	Low	Yes	No	
Provincial road	Turkey		Uncontrolled	Low	Yes	No	
Regional road	Ireland		Uncontrolled	Low	Yes	No	
Regional road	Italy		Uncontrolled	Low	Yes	No	
Road			Uncontrolled	Low	Yes	No	
Semi-highway			Interchange	High	No	Yes	
Single carriageway			Uncontrolled	Low	Yes	No	
Street			Uncontrolled	Low	Yes	No	
Superhighway			Interchange	High	No	Yes	
Super two				High	No	Optional	
Thruway			Interchange	High	No	Yes	
Two-lane expressway				High	Yes	No	

=== Notes ===
- Access type
  - Interchange - access limited to grade-separated interchanges
  - Junction (roundabout) - access limited to major roads via a roundabout
  - Partial - Limited access
  - Uncontrolled - no control of access
- Speed
  - Any - Used in all types of applications
  - Low - Low-speed
  - High - High-Speed
- Cross traffic
  - Yes- cross traffic allowed at-grade without a traffic light
  - Intersections - at-grade with a traffic signal
  - No - no cross traffic
- Divided
  - Yes
  - No
  - Some - some sections may be divided
