= Common University Entrance Test =

Entrance exam for universities in India

- Acronym: CUET
- Type: Paper-based; Computer-based test (CBT)
- Administrator: National Testing Agency (since 2021)
- Skills tested: Language, domain-specific subject, general aptitude and reasoning
- Purpose: Admission to various Universities and participating institutes
- Year started: 2010
- Duration: Section 1A, 1B - 60mins for each language Section 2 - 60mins for each Subject; Section 3 - 60minutes
- Score range: 250 per subject (Max. 5 subjects can be chosen)
- Offered: Once a year
- Regions: India
- Languages: English, Hindi, Marathi, Gujarati, Tamil, Telugu, Kannada, Malayalam, Urdu, Assamese, Bengali, Punjabi, Odia
- Annual number of test takers: ▼1,071,735 (2025)(UG)
- Website: cuet.nta.nic.in

The Common University Entrance Test (CUET) is a standardised test in India conducted by the National Testing Agency at various levels for admission to undergraduate and postgraduate programmes in Universities and other participating institutes. It is also the means through which students are admitted to certain Deemed universities across India.

== History ==
CUCET was first conducted to admission for seven central universities for 1,500 seats in 41 undergraduate, postgraduate and integrated courses from 2010. The application form was filled up through CUCET-2010 which held on 19 and 20 June 2010 in about 30 examination centers spread across the country. From its inception in 2010 until 2020, the CUCET was conducted by the Central University of Rajasthan for 12 Central Universities. The National Testing Agency took over the conduct of these exams in 2021. In 2024, as a part of National Education Policy 2020, CUET is introduced as revamped version of CUCET making it compulsory for all 45 central universities and other universities to adopt and accept.

== Exam pattern and structure ==
All question papers are Multiple Choice Question-based organized into different parts.

=== For undergraduate programmes ===
Starting 2024, the CUET exam pattern has three sections, which are Section IA – 13 Languages, Section IB – 20 Languages, Section II – 27 Domain-Specific Subjects, and Section III – General Test.

The CUET-UG consists of the Language Test, Domain-Specific papers, and the General Test. Candidates can opt for a combination of at most two languages and six domain-specific subjects or three languages and five domain-specific tests. CUET entrance test 2024 will now be conducted in two slots. The duration of the first slot is 45 to 195 minutes, and the duration of the second slot is 45 to 225 minutes. CUET-UG 2023 was conducted in three slots of three hours each.

The marking scheme includes five marks for each correct answer, and one mark will be deducted for each wrong response.

=== Criticism of exam pattern ===
In August 2022, Santishree Dhulipudi Pandit, the Vice-Chancellor of Jawaharlal Nehru University (JNU) raised questions regarding the inadequacy and inappropriateness of the multiple-choice-question (MCQ)-based CUET for postgraduate programmes. In an interview with The Indian Express, she blamed bureaucrats for failing to understand that academic merit implies analytical, language, and writing skills and cannot be equated with mere rote memorization, which, in her view, is the principal feature of MCQ-based tests. However, as her proposals were not well received by various groups, including the JNU Teachers’ Forum, and as the pattern of the CUET itself became a battleground in broader debates over nationalism, she later described the test as beneficial because it draws students from diverse sections of society, while refraining from commenting on its value as a measure of academic merit.

In the year 2026, a parliamentary committee requested the Central Government to reassess the examination pattern for social sciences and humanities. However, the report of the committee faced severe criticism from NITI Aayog. One of its members, Gobardhan Das, termed the debate over the pattern of the test as a battleground between English-educated elites and vernacular rural communities and argued that intelligence is something much more than elegance in speaking and writing alone. Furthermore, he connected the qualitative aspects of a test with rote learning and described the MCQ pattern of the test as more suitable for assessing intelligence, as it places less emphasis on rote memorization.

Subjects, Pattern of CUET - UG
	Section 1A - 13 languages	Section 2 - 27 Domain-specific Subjects	Section 3 - General Aptitude Test
Subjects	English; Telugu; Tamil; Kannada; Malayalam; Marathi; Bhojpuri; Bengali; Assamese; Punjabi; Hindi; Urdu	STEM: Agriculture Sciences; Biology/Biological Studies/Biotechnology/Biochemistry; Chemistry; Computer Science/Informatics Practices/Information Technology; Environmental Studies/sciences; Mathematics / Applied Mathematics; Physics; Commerce/Business: Accountancy/Book Keeping; Business Studies; Economics/Business Economics; Humanities and Social Sciences: Anthropology; Geography/Geology; History; Home Science; Knowledge Tradition-Practices India; Mass Media, Journalism & Communication; Political Science; Psychology; Sanskrit; Sociology; Arts, Sports & Others: Fine Arts/Visual Arts; Art Education & Sculpture /Painting & Commercial Art; Performing Arts; Teaching Aptitude; Physical Education/National Cadet Corps (NCC)/Yoga	General Aptitude Test
Syllabus	Reading Comprehension based on different types of passages–Factual, Literary and Narrative - Tested on understanding of a passage and its central theme, meanings of words used therein, etc.; Literary Aptitude and Vocabulary - Tested on Questions on synonyms & antonyms; Grammar from all topics - Tested on correcting grammatically incorrect sentences, filling blanks in sentences with appropriate words, Rearranging the parts, etc.; Verbal Ability; Vocabulary, Writings	Based On Latest Syllabus Prescribed As Per NCERT.	General Knowledge & Current Affairs; General Mental Ability; Numerical Ability; Aptitude; Quantitative Reasoning (application of basic mathematical concepts arithmetic, algebra geometry, mensuration, statistics & Probability); Logical & Analytical Reasoning
Pattern & Duration	50 MCQs to be answered in 50 Minutes (per subject)	50 MCQs to be answered in 60 Minutes (per subject)	50 MCQs to be answered in 60 minutes as per 2025 circular

=== For postgraduate programmes ===
The CUET-PG has an additional 72 test papers for various courses. The complete mapping of test paper code versus course and university is provided by NTA in the information brochure.

CUET PG Subjects
Languages & Linguistics	Sciences & Mathematics	Engineering & Technology	Education	Arts	Commerce & Management	Humanities & Social Sciences	Indology, Religion & Philosophy	Others
Linguistics: Linguistics, Applied Linguistics, Linguistics and Language Technology, Linguistics & Tribal Languages, Computational Linguistics (LAQP04); English, Comparative Literature, English & Cultural Studies, English, Modern European etc. (LAQP01); Hindi, Hindi translation, Hindi and Comparative Literature, Hindi and Modern Indian Languages etc. (LAQP02); Indian Languages: Assamese (LAQP06); Bhutia (LAQP08); Bengali (LAQP07); Gujarati (LAQP13); Hindi (LAQP02); Kannada (LAQP16); Kashmiri (LAQP17); Khasi (LAQP18); Kokborok (LAQP19); Lepcha (LAQP21); Malayalam (LAQP23); Manipuri (LAQP24); Marathi (LAQP25); Nepali (LAQP26); Odia (LAQP27); Pali (LAQP28); Punjabi (LAQP33); Sanskrit (LAQP03); Santali (LAQP40); Tamil (LAQP35); Telugu (LAQP36); Urdu (LAQP37); Foreign Languages: Arabic (LAQP05); Chinese (LAQP09); French (LAQP10); German (LAQP12); Italian (LAQP41); Japanese (LAQP15); Korean (LAQP20); Persian (LAQP30); Russian (LAQP34); Spanish (LAQP31)	Agricultural Science etc. (SCQP01); Agro-forestry etc. (SCQP02); Animal Science & Poultry (SCQP30); Applied Microbiology & Microbiology etc. (SCQP03); Architecture etc. (SCQP04); Biochemistry (SCQP05); Bioinformatics (SCQP06); Botany (SCQP07); Chemistry etc. (SCQP08); Computer Applications and Information Technology etc. (SCQP09); Environmental Sciences etc. (SCQP11); Food Science and Technology etc. (SCQP12); Forensic Science (SCQP13); Geology, Earth Sciences etc. (SCQP14); Geophysics (SCQP15); Horticulture etc. (SCQP16); Life Science etc. (SCQP17); Material Science and Technology etc. (SCQP18); Mathematics etc. (SCQP19); Medical Laboratory Technology etc. (SCQP20); MPT/MRT etc. (SCQP21); Nanoscience etc. (SCQP22); Pharmacy etc. (SCQP23); Physics etc. (SCQP24); Plant Biotechnology etc. (SCQP25); Soil Science - Soil & Water Conservation etc. (SCQP26); Statistics etc. (SCQP27); Zoology etc. (SCQP28); Atmospheric Science (SCQP29); Public Health (COQP19)	Architecture etc. (SCQP04); Chemical Thermal & Polymer Engineering (MTQP01); Civil, Structural & Transport Engineering (MTQP02); Dairy Technology (MTQP03); Data Science, Artificial Intelligence, Cyber Security & Computer Science (MTQP04); Electrical, Power and Energy Engineering (MTQP10); Electronics, Communication and Information Engineering (MTQP05); Food Engineering and Technology (MTQP06); Mechanical Engineering (MTQP07); Nanoelectronics & Material Sciences (MTQP09); Nano Science & Nano Technology etc. (MTQP08); Textile Engineering (MTQP12); Water Engineering and Management etc. (MTQP11)	B.Ed. (COQP03); B.Ed. Humanities and Social Sciences (COQP04); B.Ed. Languages (COQP05); B.Ed. Mathematics (COQP07); B.Ed. Science (COQP06); M.A. Education (COQP16); M.Ed. (COQP15)	Applied Arts (HUQP03); Art and Aesthetics (HUQP04); Fine Arts etc. (HUQP07); Dance (HUQP05); Music - Karnatak (HUQP12); Music - Percussion (HUQP25); Music – Hindustani (HUQP14); Painting (HUQP15); Pottery & Ceramics (HUQP19); Plastic Arts (HUQP17); Theatre (HUQP24)	Agri-Business Management etc. (COQP01); Commerce, Business Finance, Accounting & Taxation, Economic Administration and Financial Management etc. (COQP08); Economics, Financial Economics, Business Economics, Rural Economics etc. (COQP10); General MBA, Marketing & Finance Management, Tourism, Travel & Hotel Management, Business Analytics, Sales & Marketing etc. (COQP12); Healthcare & Hospital Management (COQP22)	Ancient Indian History, Culture & Arch, Archaeology Heritage Management, Conservation Preservation and Heritage Management etc. (HUQP01); Anthropology (HUQP02); Disaster Studies (COQP09); Development and Labour Studies (HUQP06); Geography (HUQP08); History and Archaeology, Ancient Indian History, Culture etc. (HUQP09); History of Art, Archaeology Heritage Management etc. (HUQP10); Home Science-Food & Nutrition, Nutrition and Health, Human Development & Childhood Studies, Fabric & Apparel Science, Resource Management & Design Application, Development Communication & Extension etc. (HUQP11); Museology (HUQP13); Philosophy (HUQP16); Political Science, Public Administration, Human Rights, Politics and International Relations etc. (HUQP18); Psychology, Applied Psychology, Health Psychology etc. (HUQP20); Social Work, Urban & Rural Community Development etc. (HUQP21); Sociology, Peace and Conflict Studies and Management (HUQP22); Rabindra Sangit (HUQP26); Commerce etc. (COQP08); Criminology (SCQP10)	Shiksha Shastri B.Ed. (ACQP01); Shiksha Acharya M.Ed. (ACQP02); Agama (ACQP03); Baudha Darshan & Buddhist Studies (Trilingual - Hindi, Sanskrit & English) (ACQP04); Dharma Shastra, Vastu, Paurohitya and Veda (ACQP05); Dharma Vijnan (ACQP06); Dharmashastra (BHU) (ACQP07); Hindu Studies (Bilingual - Sanskrit, English) (ACQP08); Indian Knowledge System (ACQP09); Jain Darshan (BHU) (ACQP10); Jyotish - Falit (BHU) (ACQP11); Jyotish - Ganit (BHU) (ACQP12); Krishna Yajurveda (BHU) (ACQP13); Nyaya Vaisheshika (ACQP14); Phalita and Siddantha Jyotisha (ACQP15); Puranetihas (ACQP16); Rigveda (ACQP17); Sahitya (BHU) (ACQP18); Sahitya (Alankara and Kavya Varga) (ACQP19); Samveda (ACQP20); Shukla Yajurveda (BHU) (ACQP21); Veda etc. (ACQP22); Vedanta (BHU) (ACQP23); Vedanta, Sarvadarshan, Mimansa, Nyaya etc. (ACQP24); Vyakaran (BHU) (ACQP25); Vyakarana & Sabdabodha Systems (ACQP26); Yoga (COQP21)	General, L.L.B., Bachelor of Library & Information Science, Defence and Strategic Studies, Jammu & Kashmir Studies, Hindu Studies, Women Studies, Anthropology, Digital Society, Finance & Taxation, Physical Education, Textile Design, Hospitality and Tourism Management, Gender Studies etc. (COQP11); Library and Information Science: Library & Information Science (COQP13); L.L.M. (COQP14); Mass Communication and Journalism: Mass Communication and Journalism (COQP17); Physical Education, Yoga and Sports: Physical Education (COQP18); Sports - Physiology, Biochemistry, Nutrition, Biomechanics etc. (COQP20); Yoga (COQP21)

=== Negative marking ===
Negative marking scheme is followed with a deduction of one mark for each wrong answer.

== Application fees ==
Only online applications are accepted for CUCET-2024, and application fees for various categories are listed below.

For CUET-UG: (According to Data of CUET-UG 2024)

For CUET (UG) – 2024, fees will be charged based on the number of subjects chosen by the candidates. The following fee structure is applicable for CUET (UG) - 2024:

Category	Up to 03 Subjects	For each Additional Subject
General (UR) Applicants	₹1,000 (US$10)	₹400 (US$4.20)
OBC/EWS Applicants	₹900 (US$9.30)	₹375 (US$3.90)
SC/ST/PWD Applicants	₹800 (US$8.30)	₹350 (US$3.60)
Centres outside India Applicants	₹4,500 (US$47)	₹1,800 (US$19)

For CUET-PG: (According to Data of CUET-PG 2024)

For CUET (PG) – 2024, fees will be charged based on the number of subjects chosen by the candidates. The following fee structure is applicable for CUET (PG) - 2024:

Category	Up to 02 Subjects	For each Additional Subject
General (UR) Applicants	₹1,200 (US$12)	₹600 (US$6.20)
OBC/EWS Applicants	₹1,000 (US$10)	₹500 (US$5.20)
SC/ST Applicants	₹900 (US$9.30)	₹500 (US$5.20)
PWD Applicants	₹800 (US$8.30)	₹500 (US$5.20)
Centres outside India Applicants	₹6,000 (US$62)	₹2,000 (US$21)

== Participating universities ==
=== CUET-UG ===
Admission to the following universities is done through CUET-UG in 2024 (only undergraduate and integrated master's degrees)-

Central Universities	Deemed Universities	State Universities	Private Universities
Aligarh Muslim University; Assam University; Babasaheb Bhimrao Ambedkar University; Banaras Hindu University; Central Sanskrit University; Central Tribal University of Andhra Pradesh; Central University of Andhra Pradesh; Central University of Gujarat; Central University of Haryana; Central University of Himachal Pradesh; Central University of Jammu; Central University of Jharkhand; Central University of Karnataka; Central University of Kashmir; Central University of Kerala; Central University of Odisha; Central University of Rajasthan; Central University of South Bihar; Central University of Tamil Nadu; Dr. Hari Singh Gour University; The English and Foreign Languages University; Guru Ghasidas Vishwavidyalaya; Hemwati Nandan Bahuguna Garhwal University; Indira Gandhi National Tribal University; Jamia Millia Islamia; Jawaharlal Nehru University; Mahatma Gandhi Antarrashtriya Hindi Vishwavidyalaya; Mahatma Gandhi Central University; Manipur University; Maulana Azad National Urdu University; Mizoram University; Nagaland University; National Sanskrit University; North Eastern Hill University; Pondicherry University; Rajiv Gandhi University; Shri Lal Bahadur Shastri National Sanskrit University; Sikkim University; Tezpur University; Tripura University; University of Allahabad; University of Delhi; University of Hyderabad; Visva-Bharati University	Avinashilingam Institute for Home Science and Higher Education for Women; Gurukul Kangri; Jamia Hamdard; National Rail and Transportation Institute; Tata Institute of Social Sciences; Gandhigram Rural Institute	Sri Dev Suman Uttarakhand University; Devi Ahilya Vishwavidyalaya; Dr. A.P.J. Abdul Kalam Technical University; Dr. B. R. Ambedkar School of Economics University; Dr. B. R. Ambedkar University Delhi; Madan Mohan Malaviya University of Technology; University of Kashmir https://www.kashmiruniversity.net/; Cluster University of Srinagar https://www.cusrinagar.edu.in/; Cluster University of Jammu https://clujammu.ac.in/v1/index.php; Islamia College of Science & Commerce https://islamiacollege.co.in/	BML Munjal University; Galgotias University; IIMT University; Jagannath University; Jagannath University, Jaipur; Jaypee University of Information Technology; Mewar University; Teerthanker Mahaveer University; K.R. Mangalam University

=== CUET-PG ===
Admission in the following universities is done through CUET-PG in 2024 (only master's degrees and postgraduate diplomas):

Central Universities	Deemed Universities	State Universities	Private Universities
Banaras Hindu University; Central Sanskrit University; Central Tribal University of Andhra Pradesh; Central University of Andhra Pradesh; Central University of Gujarat; Central University of Haryana; Central University of Himachal Pradesh; Central University of Jammu; Central University of Jharkhand; Central University of Karnataka; Central University of Kashmir; Central University of Kerala; Central University of Odisha; Central University of Punjab; Central University of Rajasthan; Central University of South Bihar; Central University of Tamil Nadu; Dr. Hari Singh Gour University; The English and Foreign Languages University; Guru Ghasidas Vishwavidyalaya; Hemwati Nandan Bahuguna Garhwal University; Indira Gandhi National Tribal University; Jawaharlal Nehru University; Mahatma Gandhi Antarrashtriya Hindi Vishwavidyalaya; Mahatma Gandhi Central University; Manipur University; National Sanskrit University; North Eastern Hill University; Pondicherry University; Sikkim University; Tezpur University; Tripura University; University of Hyderabad; Rajiv Gandhi National Institute of Youth Development	National Rail and Transportation Institute; IIS (Deemed to be) University, Jaipur; Jain (Deemed-to-be University), Bangalore (Karnataka); Ramakrishna Mission Vivekananda Educational and Research Institute; Jaypee Institute of Information Technology Noida	Devi Ahilya Vishwavidyalaya; Dr. A.P.J. Abdul Kalam Technical University; Dr. B. R. Ambedkar School of Economics University; Madan Mohan Malaviya University of Technology; Sardar Patel University of Police, Security and Criminal Justice; Tata Institute of Social Sciences (TISS); Delhi Technological University; Dr. Ram Manohar Lohia Avadh University; Guru Gobind Singh Indraprastha University; Indira Gandhi Delhi Technical University for Women; Ranchi University	Apex University, Jaipur; Teerthanker Mahaveer University

== See also ==
- Joint Entrance Examination – Main
- National Eligibility cum Entrance Test (disambiguation)
- Graduate Aptitude Test in Engineering
