= Central University of Rajasthan =

Central Public University in Ajmer, Rajasthan, India

- Motto: तेजस्वि नावधीतमस्तु
- Motto in English: May our study be luminous, effective, and purposeful.
- Type: Central Public University
- Established: 2009; 17 years ago
- Accreditation: NAAC (A++), UGC (Category I)
- Affiliations: UGC, AIU, ACU
- Chancellor: Vacant
- Vice-Chancellor: Dr. Anand Bhalerao
- Visitor: President of India
- Faculty: Faculty 177 (in January 2023)
- Total staff: 168 (in January 2023)
- Students: 2453 (in January 2023)
- Undergraduates: 142 (in January 2023)
- Postgraduates: 1318 (in January 2023)
- Doctoral students: 339 (in January 2023)
- Other students: 26 (in January 2023)
- Location: Bandar Sindri, Ajmer, Rajasthan, India; 26.627392°N 75.031672°E
- Campus: 518 Acres
- Acronym: CU-R or CURAJ
- Website: www.curaj.ac.in

Central University of Rajasthan (CU-R or CURAJ) is a central public university, situated in Rajasthan, India, established by an Act of Parliament and is under the purview of the Department of Higher Education in the Ministry of Education (India). It holds NAAC A++ grade, the highest level of accreditation in India, positioning the university among UGC Category I top-tier higher education institutions nationally.

It comprises 12 schools and 36 academic departments, along with one community college, offering doctoral, postgraduate, and undergraduate programs in technology, science, humanities, commerce, management, public policy and the social sciences.

== History ==
CU-R was established by an Act of Parliament as a central university on 3 March 2009. The university was started in 2009-10 with two PG programmes namely M.Sc./M.A. statistics (actuarial) and M.Sc. Tech. mathematics in Malaviya National Institute of Technology, Jaipur. It shifted to R.K. Patni College, Kishangarh in 2010-11 and started six new PG programmes. In 2012-13, the university moved to its present location, on Jaipur-Ajmer Expressway (NH-8) at Bandar Sindri village of Ajmer district.

Doctoral and undergraduate programmes were started in 2013-14.

== Campus ==
CU-R is located on the Jaipur-Ajmer Expressway (NH-8), 83 kilometers (52 miles) from Jaipur and 40 kilometers (25 miles) from Ajmer, and measures more than 209 hectares (518 acres). This land was donated by the Government of Rajasthan in 2010, construction started in 2011 and by July 2012 the university had moved to its current location. The nearest commuter railway station is Kishangarh Station, and the nearest major railway station is the Ajmer Station.

The campus is in developing phase. The departments are functioning from temporary buildings and expected to move to their permanent places in 2016. An air-conditioned auditorium with a capacity of 1500 has been constructed on the temporary basis. The construction of the guest house is completed. The university has constructed the state-of-the-art permanent buildings for hostels and implemented the concept of rainwater harvesting successfully by creating seven ponds in the campus at different locations and a sewage treatment plant has also been constructed at the periphery whose outlet is used in watering plants.

The buildings are constructed using a fusion of traditional architectural features of Rajasthan with contemporary design elements. The chhatri and jaali are used in the buildings to give a unique blend of the traditional and modern architecture.

=== Sports facilities ===
The university has a football ground, a hockey ground, a cricket ground, two basketball courts, two volleyball grounds and many fields for various other sports.The indoor play area is currently under construction

=== Library ===
The university library has more than 31,000 books including references and subscribed more than 8000 online journals under e-ShodhSindhu (UGC- INFONET Digital Library) Consortium and more than 2,000 online journals being subscribed by the university library i.e. Science Direct, SciFinder, Bentham Science, EBSCO, ACM Digital Library and IEEE online journals. More than 100 national and international print journals also being subscribed by the university library.

== Organization and administration ==
=== Governance ===
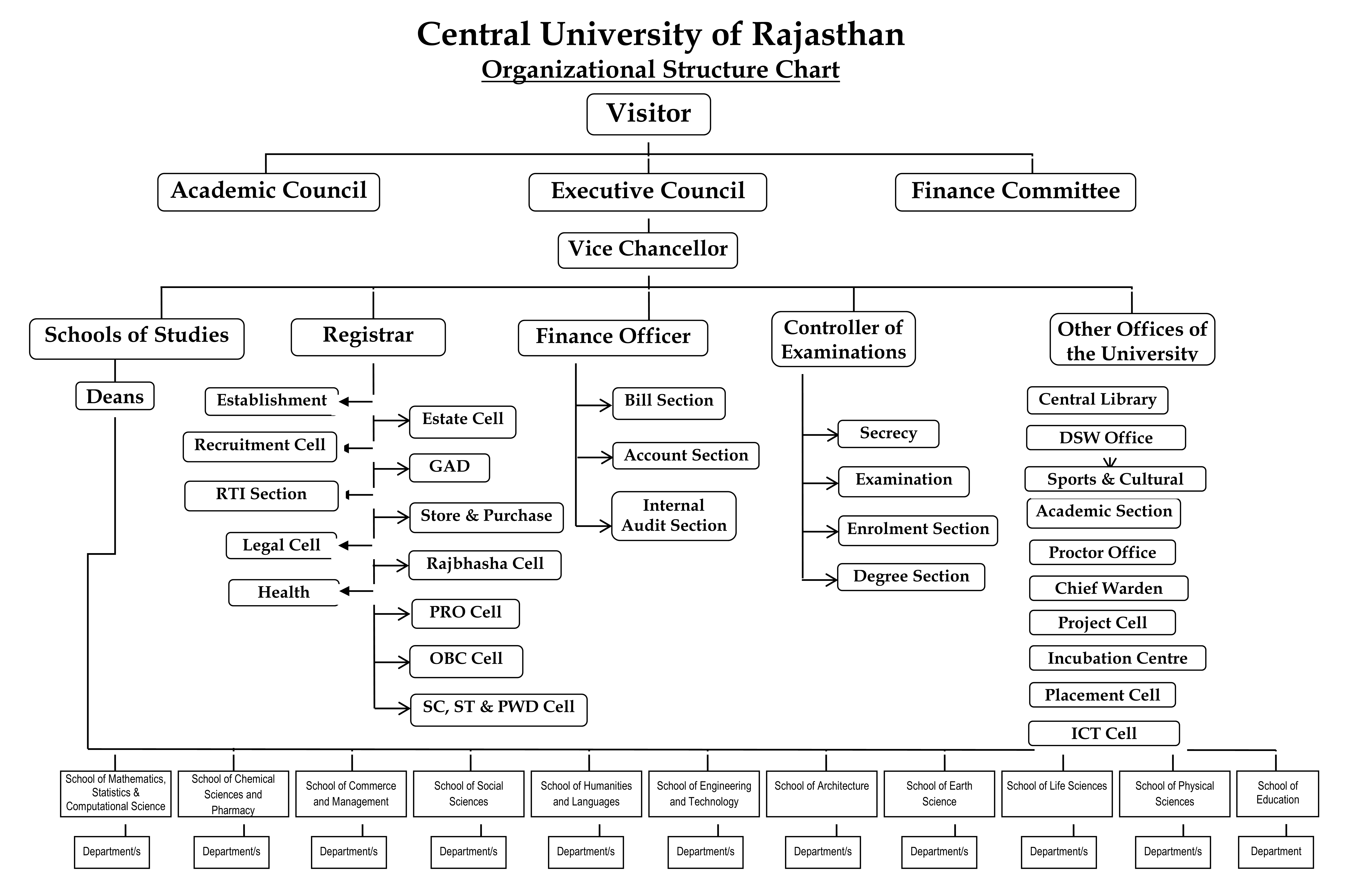
Organizational structure of the Central University of Rajasthan

=== Schools and departments ===
The university is organized into twelve schools, each of which has several departments:

Schools	Departments
Architecture	Department of Architecture; DDU Kaushal Kendra
Chemical Sciences and Pharmacy	Department of Chemistry; Department of Pharmacy
Commerce & Management	Department of Commerce; Department of Management; Department of Hotel and Tourism Management
Earth Sciences	Department of Atmospheric Science; Department of Environmental Science
Engineering and Technology	Department of Computer Science and Engineering; Department of Electronics and Communication Engineering; Department of Biomedical Engineering; Department of Vocational Studies and Skill Development
Humanities & Languages	Department of English; Department of Hindi; Department of Linguistics
Interdisciplinary School of Health Sciences	Department of Health Sciences
Life Sciences	Department of Biochemistry; Department of Biotechnology; Department of Microbiology
Mathematics, Statistics & Computational Sciences	Department of Computer Science; Department of Data Science & Analytics; Department of Mathematics; Department of Statistics
Physical Sciences	Department of Physics
Social Sciences	Department of Culture and Media Studies; Department of Economics; Department of Public Policy, Law and Governance; Department of Social Work; Department of Society - Technology Interface
Sports Sciences, Yoga, and Education	Department of Sports-Biosciences; Department of Sports Biomechanics; Department of Sports Psychology; Department of Education; Department of Yoga

== Academics ==
=== Programmes ===
CU-R offers academic and research programmes in technology, science, humanities, commerce, management, public policy and social sciences. This includes five year integrated M.Sc. programmes in various fields, leading to the degree of B.Sc. and M.Sc. These programmes have four core subjects in the 1st and 2nd year (semester I - IV), and only one subject as major (like honors degree) in 3rd year (semester V & VI) in which the student will pursue the M.Sc. degree. The university offers various PG programmes with specialization, M. A. programmes, M.Sc. programmes and three-year Integrated M.Sc. B.Ed programmes.

=== Admissions ===
The university admits students to integrated M.Sc., integrated M.Sc.-B.Ed and PG programmes through the Common University Entrance Test (CUET) held yearly and conducted at centers all over India. Earlier, the university coordinated the Central Universities Common Entrance Test (CUCET) each year from its introduction. In 2017, ten universities took part in CUCET, which included Central University of Haryana, Central University of Jammu, Central University of Jharkhand, Central University of Karnataka, Central University of Kashmir, Central University of Kerala, Central University of Punjab, Central University of South Bihar, Central University of Tamil Nadu, Mahatma Gandhi Central University and Assam University. The last CUCET was held in 2020, in which15 Central Universities, 4 State Universities and the National Institute of Technology Tiruchirappalli participated. From 2021, the National Testing Agency has been assigned the task of conducting the Common University Entrance Test (CUET) for Postgraduate (PG) programmes.

The admission to the Bachelor of Technology (BTech) degree is done through the seat allocated by Joint Seat Allocation Authority (JoSAA)/Central Seat Allocation Board (CSAB). However, the admission to the M.Tech. degree is made on the basis of GATE score through Centralized Counselling for M.Tech./M.Arch./M. Plan Admissions.

Admission to the doctoral programmes are accomplished through the CUET and followed by an interview.

Admission to B.Voc. (interior design) programme is done through an aptitude test conducted by the university.

=== Accreditation and rankings ===
University rankings

General – India
- NIRF (Universities) (2023): 151-200
- NIRF (Universities) (2024): 151-200

Pharmacy – India
- NIRF (2023): 27
- NIRF (2024): 29

Central University of Rajasthan was ranked in the 151–200 band by the NIRF universities ranking of 2024.

The university has received A++ Grade from NAAC.

== Student life ==
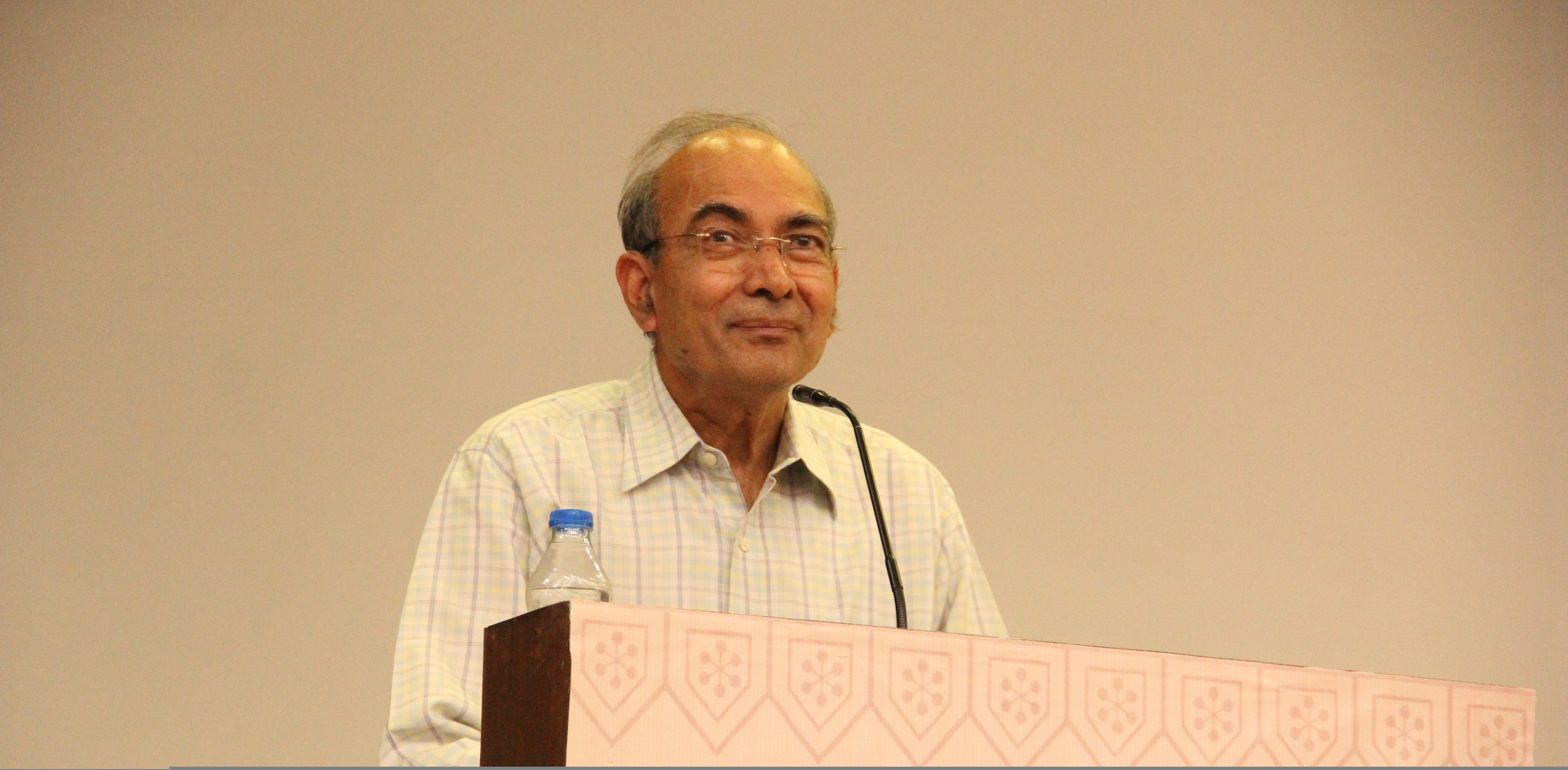
A.P. Singh addressing the audience during the closing ceremony of "Math Earth-2K18"

=== Activities ===
Besides academics, a range of societies and clubs exist for students like the student-run University Magazine called उdaan, the film club, the music club, the dance club, the photography club known as the Lenswala, The Mathletes, the Navsrijan Society and the Economics Society of CU-R. The annual cultural fest is known as Marukriti. Math Earth, the Economania, Impresario and Myriad Hues are the annual fests of the respective department and student societies of the university. The university's students also participate in regional and national level inter-university fests and competitions like the Association of Indian Universities annual fest known as UNIFEST.

=== Halls of residence ===
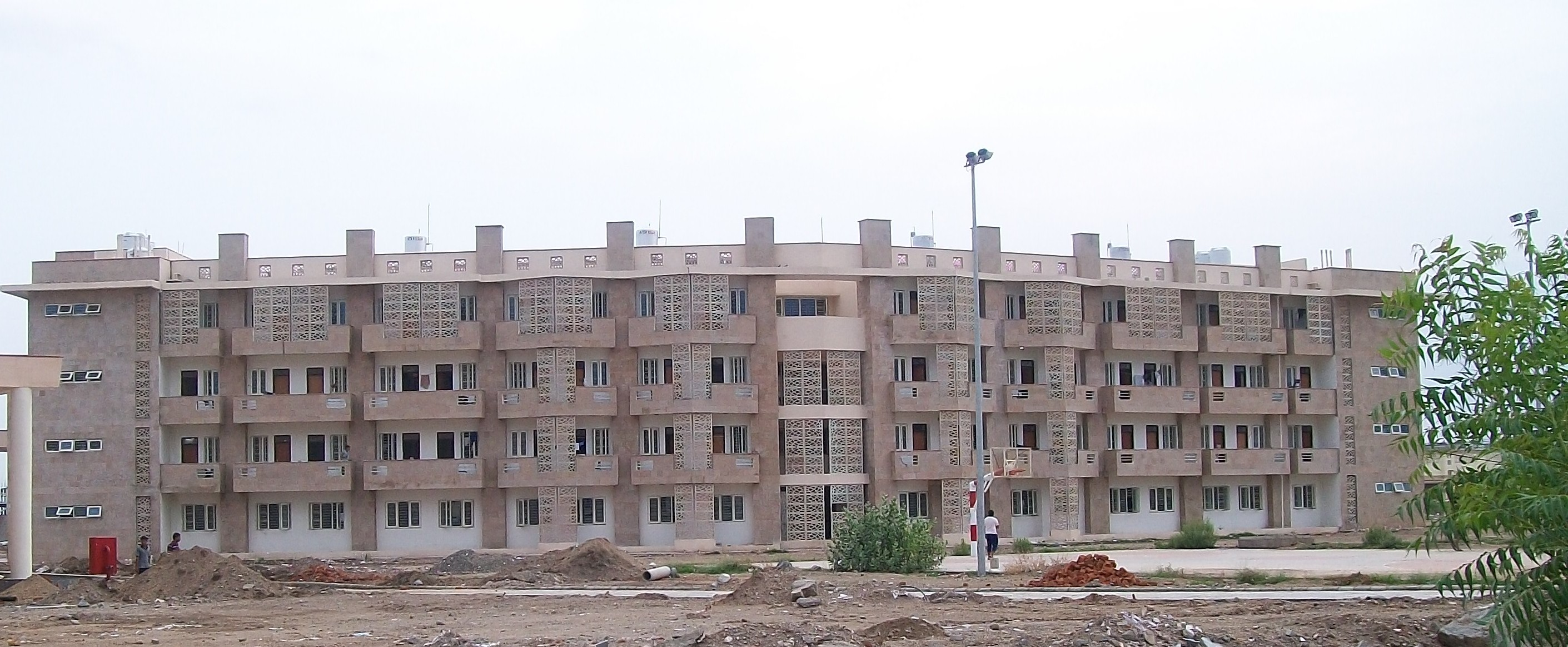
Captain Vikram Batra Hostel/Hostel B5

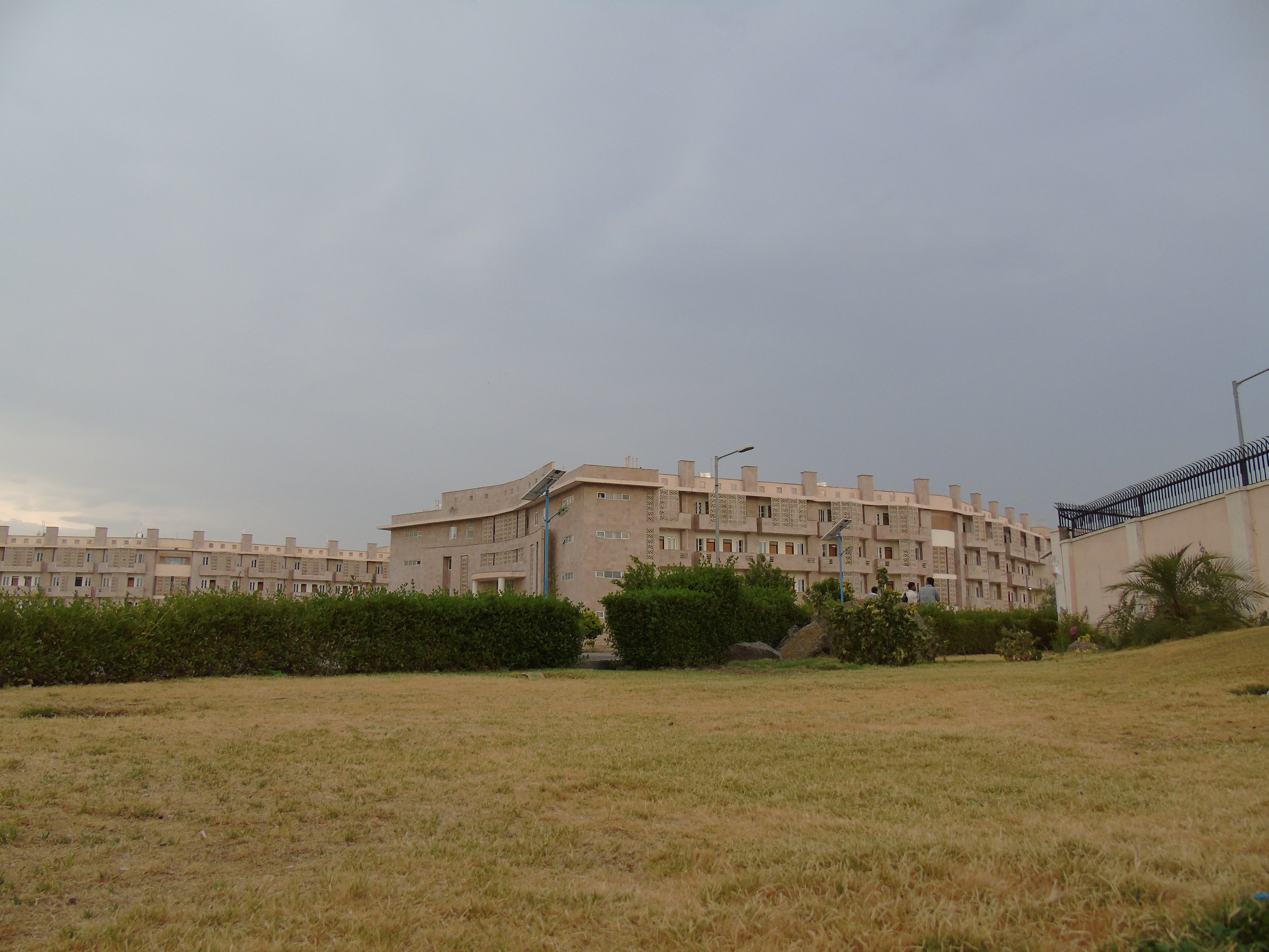
Second Lieutenant Arun Khetarpal Hostel/Hostel B6

There are 6 residences (hostels), including 2 hostels for UG and PG male students, 2 hostels for UG and PG female students, one hostel for male research scholars, teaching and non-teaching staff and one hostel for female research scholars, teaching and non-teaching staff.

== Controversy ==
=== Student suicide ===
In 2016, a Ph.D. student from the Department of Mathematics, who hailed from Uttar Pradesh, allegedly committed suicide by hanging himself in his hostel room. A student of B.Sc. microbiology allegedly committed suicide by hanging herself in her hostel on the campus on 27 January 2023. In another incident, a Ph.D. student from the Department of Social Works, who hailed from Ladakh, was found hanging in her hostel room on 26 July 2023.

=== Security officer controversy ===
In August 2023, a female student accused the security officer of the university of clicking and circulating her photograph without her permission. Police reached the campus after students protested, and the university ordered an internal investigation.

== See also ==
- Jaipur
- Banaras Hindu University
- Jawaharlal Nehru University
- Malaviya National Institute of Technology
- University of Rajasthan
