= Entrance examination =

Test selecting students for admission to an educational institution

In education, an entrance examination or admission examination is an examination that educational institutions conduct to select prospective students. It may be held at any stage of education, from primary to tertiary, even though it is typically held at tertiary stage.

== By country ==
=== France ===
France has various entrance examinations, including one to enter medical studies, and entrance examinations for the Grandes écoles of engineering and of business, for which students prepare for two years in a Classe préparatoire aux grandes écoles.

=== India ===
In India, entrance examinations are chiefly used for admission to many of the country's educational institutions. Certain institutions are considered "Institutes of National Importance," including the Indian Institutes of Technology (IITs), All India Institutes of Medical Sciences (AIIMS), and National Institutes of Technology (NITs), which conduct entrance exams for admission. The National Level Common Entrance Examination (NLCEE) is a talent hunt initiative in India that provides scholarships and exposure visits to students aspiring for higher education. The stiff competition has led to a situation where many students neglect their school studies and focus solely on 'entrance coaching' which is time-consuming and expensive. This has led many states to scrap the entrances and base admissions on the school leaving marks which, are none too reliable. Experts point out that in a country where many different boards are present common entrances are essential, but application skills rather than cramming should be stressed on. Frequent changes in the pattern of examination are essential since sticking to a 'standard text' or 'standard pattern' alone will favour the coaching industry and the rote-learners.

Entrance examinations in India trace their roots to the University of Calcutta, which when established in 1857, introduced the practice to decide eligibility for admission. In that exam, one student qualified for every four candidates. In the absence of a standardized school graduation examination, the University's entrance examinations were used as a substitute, known later as Matriculation examinations. Post-independence, India has different systems of education whose syllabus and examination process are governed by both central and state-based statutory boards. Grades 10 and 12 which mark the culmination of secondary and higher secondary education, have standardized final examinations, referred to as the Secondary School Leaving Certificate (SSLC) examination after grade 10 (class X) and the Higher Secondary Examination (HSC) after grade 12th.

=== United Kingdom ===
A few British universities have lost confidence in the grades that are awarded by secondary schools, and require a few applicants to sit for a competitive entrance examination or other aptitude test. According to the Schools Minister, "strong evidence has been emerging of grade inflation across subjects" in recent years.

== COVID-19 impact ==
Due to the presence of COVID-19 in many countries that implemented school closures on either a state or national scale, some entrance examinations for high schools were eventually cancelled to reduce student stress and the risk of COVID-19 infection during attendance.

== See also ==
- Civil service entrance examination
- Competitive examination
- High-stakes testing
- List of admission tests to colleges and universities
- National Eligibility cum Entrance Test (Postgraduate)
- Selective school
- Standardized test
- Test (assessment)
- Vestibular exam
