= Indira Gandhi University =

Indira Gandhi University may refer to one of several universities in India named after former prime minister Indira Gandhi:

- Indira Gandhi National Open University, public open university in Delhi
- Indira Gandhi Delhi Technical University for Women, women's university in Delhi
- Indira Gandhi National Tribal University, central university in Amarkantak, Madhya Pradesh
- Indira Gandhi University, Rewari, state university in Rewari, Haryana
- Indira Gandhi Agricultural University (also called Indira Gandhi Krishi Vishwavidyalaya), in Raipur, Chhattisgarh
