= Ghudda =

Coordinates: 30°07′N 74°47′E

Ghudda is a village in Bathinda district in Punjab, India. It was founded in the 17th century by Baba Ghudda. The 2011 census reported a population of 5320.

The village has a sports school, a horse riding institute, a veterinary college and a hospital.

== Economy ==
Agriculture is the primary occupation of residents.

== Education ==
The Central University of Punjab is a notable educational institution in the village.
