= Sammakka Sarakka Central Tribal University =

- Motto: ज्ञानं परमं ध्येयम्
- Motto in English: Knowledge is the Supreme Goal
- Type: Central Tribal university
- Established: 2023; 3 years ago
- Affiliations: UGC
- Chancellor: Vacant
- Vice-Chancellor: Y. L. Srinivas
- Rector: Governor of Telangana
- Visitor: President of India
- Location: Mulugu, Telangana, India
- Campus: Suburban
- Acronym: SSCTU
- Website: ssctu.ac.in

The Sammakka Sarakka Central Tribal University (SSCTU) is a public central university. It was established in Mulugu, Telangana, India by the Act of Parliament- Act 36 of 2023 by an amendment to the Central Universities Act, 2009.

== History ==
On 7 December 2023, the Bill was passed by the Lok Sabha. This university offers graduate and post graduate level programs. The Telangana State Government has allocated 335.04 acres of land for this university and allocated a fund of Rs. 900 crores. Until the construction of a permanent campus for this university is completed, the university will operate from the Youth Training Institute campus located in Jakaram village near the Mulugu district headquarters.

The university will offer graduate, postgraduate and doctoral level programmes. The university has been named “Sammakka Sarakka Central Tribal University” on the Mother and Daughter deities of Tribes of the region.

Y. L. Srinivas has been appointed as the first Vice-Chancellor of Sammakka Sarakka Central Tribal University on 11 March 2025.
