= Central University of Jammu =

Central university in Samba, Jammu, Jammu & Kashmir, India

- Other name: CU Jammu
- Motto: बुद्धिर्ज्ञानेन शुध्येहती (Sanskrit)
- Motto in English: Knowledge Refines.
- Type: Central university
- Established: 2009; 17 years ago
- Accreditation: NAAC
- Academic affiliations: UGC; AIU; ACU
- Chancellor: Gopalaswami Parthasarathy
- Vice-Chancellor: Dr. Sanjeev Jain
- Visitor: President of India
- Academic staff: 143 (2022)
- Students: 2,150 (2022)
- Undergraduates: 854 (2022)
- Postgraduates: 1,086 (2022)
- Doctoral students: 211 (2022)
- Location: Rahya Suchani, Bagla, Samba, J&K, India; 32°38′04″N 75°00′39″E
- Campus: Rural 600 acres (240 ha)
- Website: www.cujammu.ac.in

Central University of Jammu is a Central University in the Samba district of the Jammu division of Jammu and Kashmir, India. It was established through an Act of Parliament, The Central Universities Act, 2009. It started functioning from 2011. Dr. Sudhir Singh Bloeria was first Vice Chancellor of the university.

== History ==
The Central University of Jammu came into existence on 8 August 2011, with the appointment of the first Vice-Chancellor. It was established by the Central Universities Act, 2009 (Act No.25 of 2009 read with the Central Universities Act, 2009).

The first academic session (2011-2012) commenced with three Post Graduate courses in English, Economics and Applied Mathematics at Temporary Academic Block-I (TAB-I) at Sidhra bypass road, Jammu. In the next academic session (2012-2013), five PG Courses were added: Computer Science, Educational Studies, Environmental Sciences, Human Resource Management and Travel & Tourism Management in Temporary Academic Block (TAB-II) at Sainik Colony Extension. Since the third session (2013-2014) all the departments are functioning from TAB at Sainik Colony. Four new post graduate courses were introduced in the academic session (2014-2015): National Security Studies; Public Policy & Public Administration; Social Work and Mass Communication & New Media. The University also offers Integrated M-Phil-Ph.D programme in eight subjects.

== Campus ==
The University carries out its administrative functions from its head office at Bagla, Rahya-Suchani, District. Samba.

The Central University of Jammu campus is under construction at Village Bagla, Raya Suchani in District Samba, which is at an approximate distance of 30 kms from Jammu and 70 kms from Kathua respectively.

== Organisation and administration ==
=== Governance ===
The President of India is the Visitor of the University. The Chancellor is the ceremonial head of the university while the executive powers rest with the Vice-chancellor. The Court, the Executive Council, the Academic Council, the Board of studies and the Finance Committee are the administrative authorities of the University.

The University Court is the supreme authority of the University and has the power to review, the broad policies and programmes of the University and to suggest measures for the improvement and development of the University; The Executive Council is the highest executive body of the University. The Academic Council is the highest academic body of the University and is responsible for the co-ordination and exercising general supervision over the academic policies of the University. It has the right to advise the Executive Council on all academic matters. The Finance Committee is responsible for recommending financial policies, goals, and budgets.

=== Schools and Centres ===
School of Business Studies

- Department of Human Resource Management & Organizational Behaviour
- Department of Tourism and Travel Management
- Department of Marketing and Supply Chain Management
- Department of Retail Management
- Department of Banking and Finance

School of Basic and Applied Sciences

- Department of Mathematics
- Department of Computer Science and Information Technology
- Department of Physics and Astronomical Sciences
- Department of Chemistry and Chemical Sciences
- Department of Nano Science and Material

School of Education

- Department of Educational Studies
- School of Humanities and Social Sciences
- Department of Economics
- Department of Public Policy and Public Administration
- Department of Sociology and Social work
- Centre for Comparative Religion and Civilization

School of Languages

- Department of English
- Department of Hindi & Other Indian Languages

School of Life Sciences

- Department of Environmental Sciences
- Department of Animal Sciences and Wild Life
- Department of Plant Sciences
- Centre for Molecular Biology

School of National Security Studies

- Department of National Security Studies
- School of Knowledge Management, Information and Media Studies
- Department of Mass Communication and New Media

School of Engineering

- Department of Computer Science
- Department of Electronics and Communication Engineering

== Academics ==
The university offers UG, PG & research oriented programmes (PhD).

== See also ==
- Central University of Kashmir
- Central University of Punjab
- Central University of Bihar
