= Dr. B. R. Ambedkar School of Economics University =

University in Karnataka, India

- Other name: BASE University
- Type: Public
- Established: October 4, 2017; 8 years ago
- Affiliations: UGC
- Chancellor: Governor of Karnataka
- Vice-Chancellor: Vishwanatha
- Location: Bengaluru, Karnataka, India; 12.9490468°N 77.5175997°E
- Website: Official website

Dr. B. R. Ambedkar School of Economics (BASE) University, Bengaluru is a public university located in Bengaluru, Karnataka, India. Founded in 2017, BASE was planned and modeled in line with the London School of Economics. The university and the first academic session was inaugurated by the former Prime Minister of India and economist, Dr. Manmohan Singh on 4 October 2017. The permanent campus of BASE was inaugurated by prime minister Narendra Modi in 2022.

A 5-year Integrated Masters Programme (B.Sc. + M.Sc.) in Economics is the flagship course offered by the university. The course contains the option to exit after three years with a B.Sc. degree. Additionally, the university also offers a two-year M.Sc. in economics, two-year M.Sc. in Financial Economics as well as a PhD course. The students are admitted through CUET, a national level entrance test. The 43-acre university is fully residential with fees of Rs. 1.25 Lakh per annum, including accommodation.

== History ==
The foundation of the university was laid by the former President of India and economist, Pranab Mukherjee on 14 April 2017. The vision was to build an institution of international repute and character, and the Silicon Valley of India was chosen as the location as it is the hub of IT, Banking and other industrial sectors in India. Furthermore, Mukherjee comments on the vision for the university that there is a need to focus on skill development and research to reap the fruits of the large demography of the nation. Speaking on maintaining an international quality of standards and avoiding brain drain, Mukherjee says, "I would like to request all stakeholders of BASE to ensure that our objective should be international, not local interest. Serve the interest of excellence to attract the best to BASE". The government had sought the help of world's best economics school, London School of Economics, in designing and execution of the programmes, faculty and other facilities. The collaboration with the university was based on co-guideship and research.

The university was named after Dr. B.R. Ambedkar to commemorate his 125th birth anniversary. The Government of Karnataka constituted a committee of experts under the chairmanship of Shri. S. V. Ranganath, vice chairman, KSHEC and former chief secretary to the Government of Karnataka. Based on the recommendation of this committee, the Government of Karnataka & Honorable Chief Minister Shri Siddaramaiah approved the establishment of this institution at a total cost of Rs 350 crores, Rs 275 crores from government funding and Rs 75 crores from corporate sources & released Rs 107 crores in the financial year 2016–17. The Government of Karnataka has allotted 43.45 acres of land In the Jnana Bharathi Campus of Bangalore University for the establishment of the institute. It was granted the university status in 2018 by the state government in order to get funds and recognition from the University Grants Commission (UGC).

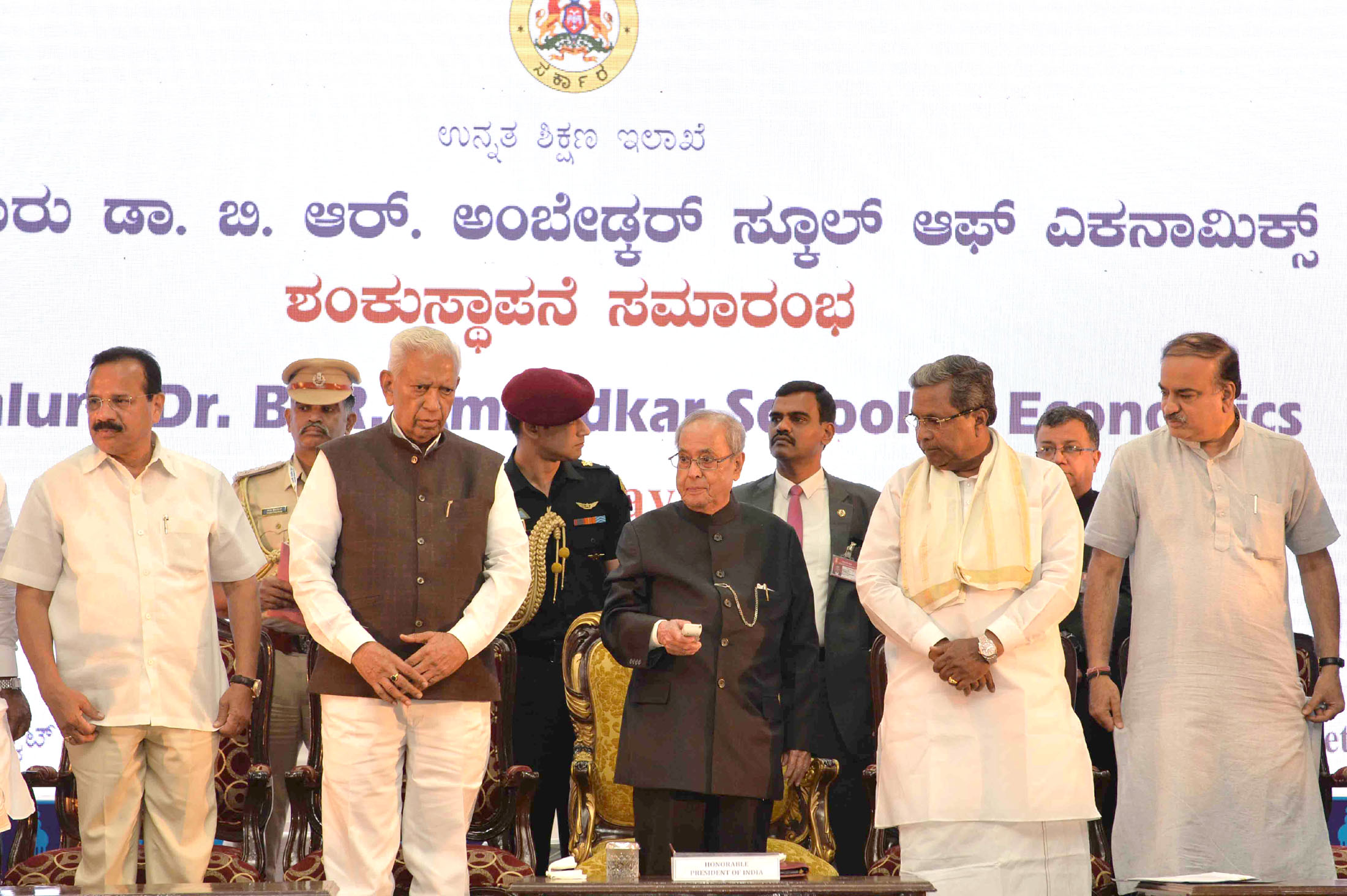
Shri Pranab Mukherjee laying the foundation stone of the university.

== Campus ==
The institute is situated on a 43-acre land allotted by the Government of Karnataka. Situated in Bengaluru, the capital of Karnataka, the institute has numerous amenities and transportation facilities in its vicinity. Apart from having air-conditioned smart classrooms, the campus also houses an auditorium, a learning resource centre, student gym facilities, and residence for the staff as well as the students.

== Academics ==
=== Programs Offered ===
==== 5 Year Integrated MSc Economics ====
The flagship program of university, rigorously training students for a duration of 5 years in the field of economics. The syllabus is well designed to build an in depth understanding of economics along with allied areas. There is an emphasis on developing quantitative skills via econometrics and statistics. The students have an option to exit after 3 years with a degree of BSc (H) Economics.

==== MSc Economics ====
University offers a 2-year MSc Economics as well as in Financial Economics program for candidates who are well motivated and seek an in depth understanding in various subjects in the domain of Economics. The quantitative focus in the core courses will add value in any area of employment. In addition, the elective courses will permit a specialisation designed for the corporate sector, public policy or research or any combination of these that each student is interested in.

==== PhD Economics ====
University offers a full-time Ph.D. program for candidates who are motivated, have a distinguished academic record and intellectual curiosity. The main goal of the Doctoral program is to facilitate and nurture students to carry out academic research on complex issues in Economics and Developmental Studies. The university has a quantitative orientation and encourages interdisciplinary studies. This program is designed to create academic, corporate and policy researchers equipped in researching in areas of national and global economic issues.

== Organisation and administration ==
=== Governing Council ===
The present composition of the governing council of Bengaluru Dr. B.R. Ambedkar School of Economics is as follows:

Sr No.	Name of the members	Designation
1.	Dr. M. C. Sudhakar (Honorable Minister for Higher Education, Government of Karnataka)	Chairman
2.	H. C. Mahadevappa (Honorable Minister for Social Welfare, Government of Karnataka)	Vice-chairman
3.	Vice Chairman, Karnataka State Higher Education Council	Ex-officio Member
4.	Vishwanatha (Vice Chancellor, Dr. B. R. Ambedkar School of Economics University)	Member
5.	Sudha Murty (chairperson, Infosys Foundation)	Nominated Member
6.	Dr. Sanjeev Sanyal, (Principal Economic advisor, Ministry of Finance, Government of India)	Nominated Member
7.	Dr. K. P. Gopalkrishna (Founder of National Public School, Bengaluru)	Nominated Member
8.	R. Balasubramaniam (Public policy advocate, leadership trainer and activist)	Nominated Member
9.	S. Bisalaiah (Former Vice Chancellor, University of Agricultural Science, Bengaluru)	Nominated Member
10.	I. S. N. Prasad, IAS (Additional Chief Secretary, Finance Department, Government of Karnataka)	Ex-officio Member
11.	Dr. N. Nagambika Devi (Principal Secretary to Government, Department of Social Welfare, Government of Karnataka)	Ex-officio Member
12.	G. Kumar Naik, IAS, (Principal Secretary to Government, Department of Education (Higher Education), Government of Karnataka)	Ex-officio Member
13.	Pradeep P., IAS (Commissioner of Collegiate Education)	Ex-officio Member
14.	Dr. Jayakara Shetty M. (Vice Chancellor, Bangalore University)	Ex-officio Member
15.	S. Madheswaran (Director, Institute for Social and Economic Change, Bengaluru)	Ex-officio Member
16.	Dr. Gopal Krishna Joshi (executive director, Karnataka State Higher Education Council)	Ex-officio Member
17.	Srinivas Srirangam	Special invitee
18.	Prashant Prakash	Special invitee
19.	M. Lakshmi Narayana, IAS (Retd.) (Advisor to Chief Minister of Karnataka)	Special invitee
20.	Vasanth Horatti (Chairman Of Oxford College, Hubballi)	Special invitee
21.	G. Prabhu (Registrar, Dr. B. R. Ambedkar School of Economics University, Bengaluru)	Member Secretary

== See also ==
- Madras School of Economics
- Delhi School of Economics
- Jamia Millia Islamia
- University of Hyderabad
- Indira Gandhi Institute of Development Research
- Centre for Development Studies
- Gokhale Institute of Politics and Economics
