= National Level Common Entrance Examination =

Scholarship and talent identification examination

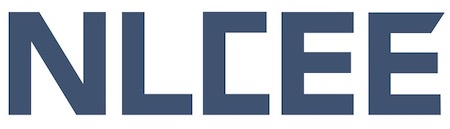
- Official Logo of NLCEE
- Acronym: NLCEE
- Type: Scholarship and Talent Identification Exam
- Skills tested: General Knowledge, Logical Reasoning, Problem-solving, Analytical Reasoning
- Purpose: Identify academically gifted students and provide exposure opportunities
- Year started: 2019 (6 years ago)
- Duration: 3 hours
- Score validity: 1 year
- Offered: Annually (usually in December)
- Regions: India
- Languages: English
- Annual number of test takers: 987,650
- Prerequisites: Students from Class 9-12 or competitive exam aspirants
- Used by: Universities, Institutes
- Qualification rate: Top 1% merit-based
- Exposure Opportunities: Visits to IITs, ISRO, NASA for selected students
- Website: nlcee.org

The National Level Common Entrance Examination (NLCEE) is a non-profit scholarship and talent identification examination conducted in India. It provides opportunities for academically gifted students, particularly from underprivileged backgrounds, by offering scholarships, career guidance, and exposure visits to prestigious institutions like IITs and ISRO.

== History ==
NLCEE was founded in 2019 by alumni from the Indian Institutes of Technology (IITs) and Indian Institutes of Management (IIMs) to address educational inequity. Initially targeted at students from Bihar and the northeastern states, it expanded nationwide, becoming one of India's largest private scholarship initiatives.

== Eligibility ==
NLCEE is open to students from classes 9 to 12 and competitive exam aspirants such as JEE and NEET candidates. Special focus is given to underprivileged students.

== Exam Structure ==
NLCEE involves a written test with sections including:

- General knowledge – Current affairs and basic general knowledge.
- Mathematics – Problem-solving and analytical reasoning.
- Science – Conceptual understanding of physics, chemistry, and biology.
- Logical Reasoning – Critical thinking and reasoning skills.

The examination is available in online and offline formats, conducted in multiple languages.

== See also ==
- Indian Institutes of Technology
- Indian Space Research Organisation
