= Central university (India) =

Type of university in India

Central universities in India are public universities established by an Act of Parliament and are under the purview of the Department of Higher Education in the Ministry of Education except for nine universities which are under the purview of other ministries. In general, universities in India are recognised by the University Grants Commission (UGC), which draws its power from the University Grants Commission Act, 1956. In addition, 15 Professional Councils are established, controlling different aspects of accreditation and coordination. Central universities, in addition, are covered by the Central Universities Act, 2009, which regulates their purpose, powers, governance etc., and established 12 new universities. As of June 2023, the list of central universities published by the UGC includes 56 central universities.

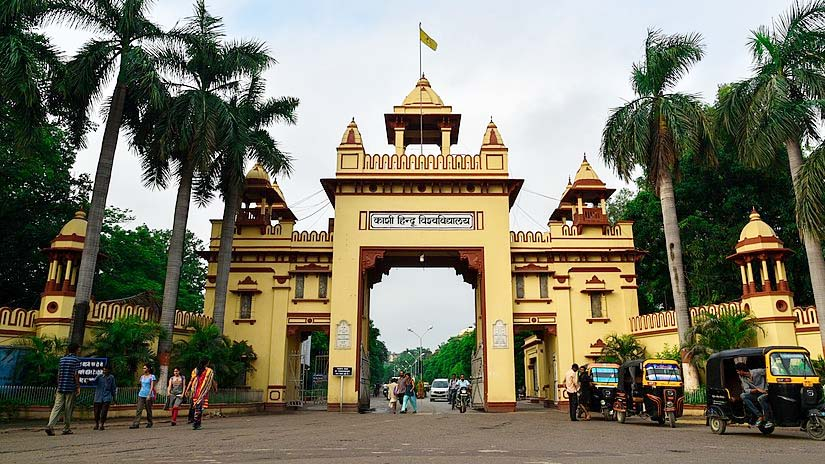
The main entrance gate of Banaras Hindu University, first central university of India (founded and centralised in 1916).

Locations of Central Universities

== Universities by state ==
The region with the most central universities in India is Delhi with seven universities. There are central universities in all of the states of India except Goa. Of the union territories, there are central universities in Delhi, Jammu and Kashmir, Ladakh and Puducherry.

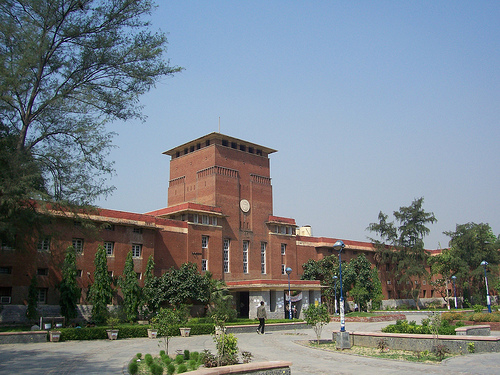
The University of Delhi is one of the seven central universities in Delhi.

Central universities by state and union territory
State / union territory	Central universities
Andhra Pradesh	3
Arunachal Pradesh	1
Assam	2
Bihar	4
Chhattisgarh	1
Delhi	7
Gujarat	2
Haryana	1
Himachal Pradesh	1
Jammu and Kashmir	2
Jharkhand	1
Karnataka	1
Kerala	1
Ladakh	1
Madhya Pradesh	2
Maharashtra	1
Manipur	3
Meghalaya	1
Mizoram	1
Nagaland	1
Odisha	1
Puducherry	1
Punjab	1
Rajasthan	1
Sikkim	1
Tamil Nadu	2
Telangana	4
Tripura	1
Uttar Pradesh	6
Uttarakhand	1
West Bengal	1
Total	57

== List of central universities in India ==
Renovated gate of Tezpur University, a central university established in 1994

The establishment Act of universities established by the Central Universities Act, 2009, or after it, is noted. All other universities were established by a specific Act.

Central universities of India
University	State	Location	Centralised	Established	Specialisation	Sources
Central Tribal University of Andhra Pradesh (Note: Established under amendments Central Universities (Amendment) Act, 2014, Central Universities (Amendment) Act, 2019, Central Universities (Amendment) Act, 2021 and Central Universities (Amendment) Act, 2022.)	Andhra Pradesh	Vizianagaram	2019	2019	General	
Central University of Andhra Pradesh	Andhra Pradesh	Anantapuram	2019	2019	General	
National Sanskrit University (Note: Established under The Central Sanskrit Universities Act, 2020)	Andhra Pradesh	Tirupati	2020	1956	Sanskrit	
Rajiv Gandhi University	Arunachal Pradesh	Itanagar	2007	1985	General	
Assam University	Assam	Silchar	1994	1994	General	
Tezpur University	Assam	Tezpur	1994	1994	General	
Central University of South Bihar	Bihar	Gaya	2009	2009	General	
Mahatma Gandhi Central University	Bihar	Motihari	2016	2016	General	
Nalanda University (Note: Directly funded by Government of India and not by UGC.) (Note: Established under central act Nalanda University Act, 2010)	Bihar	Rajgir	2010	2010	International university	
Dr. Rajendra Prasad Central Agriculture University	Bihar	Samastipur	2016	1905	Agriculture	
Guru Ghasidas Vishwavidyalaya	Chhattisgarh	Bilaspur	2009	1983	General	
Central Sanskrit University	Delhi	New Delhi	2020	1970	Sanskrit	
Indira Gandhi National Open University	Delhi	New Delhi	1985	1985	Distance education	
Jamia Millia Islamia	Delhi	New Delhi	1988	1920	General	
Jawaharlal Nehru University	Delhi	New Delhi	1969	1969	General	
Shri Lal Bahadur Shastri National Sanskrit University	Delhi	New Delhi	2020	1962	Sanskrit	
South Asian University	Delhi	New Delhi	2010	2010	International university	
University of Delhi	Delhi	New Delhi	1922	1922	General	
Central University of Gujarat (Note: Established by the Central Universities Act, 2009)	Gujarat	Gandhinagar	2009	2009	General	
Gati Shakti Vishwavidyalaya	Gujarat	Vadodara	2018	2022	Transport	
Central University of Haryana	Haryana	Mahendragarh	2009	2009	General	
Central University of Himachal Pradesh	Himachal Pradesh	Dharamsala	2009	2009	General	
Central University of Jammu	Jammu and Kashmir	Jammu	2011	2011	General	
Central University of Kashmir	Jammu and Kashmir	Ganderbal	2009	2009	General	
Central University of Jharkhand	Jharkhand	Ranchi	2009	2009	General	
Central University of Karnataka	Karnataka	Kalaburagi	2009	2009	General	
Central University of Kerala	Kerala	Kasaragod	2009	2009	General	
Sindhu Central University	Ladakh	Khalatse	2021	2021	General	
Dr. Hari Singh Gour University	Madhya Pradesh	Sagar	2009	1946	General	
Indira Gandhi National Tribal University	Madhya Pradesh	Amarkantak	2007	2007	General	
Mahatma Gandhi Antarrashtriya Hindi Vishwavidyalaya	Maharashtra	Wardha	1997	1997	Hindi	
Central Agricultural University	Manipur	Imphal	1993	1993	Agriculture	
Manipur University	Manipur	Imphal	2005	1980	General	
National Sports University	Manipur	Imphal	2018	2018	Sports	
North Eastern Hill University	Meghalaya	Shillong	1973	1973	General	
Mizoram University	Mizoram	Aizawl	2000	2000	General	
Nagaland University	Nagaland	Lumami	1994	1994	General	
Central University of Odisha	Odisha	Koraput	2009	2009	General	
Pondicherry University	Puducherry	Pondicherry	1985	1985	General	
Central University of Punjab	Punjab	Bathinda	2009	2009	General	
Central University of Rajasthan	Rajasthan	Ajmer	2009	2009	General	
Sikkim University	Sikkim	Gangtok	2007	2007	General	
Central University of Tamil Nadu	Tamil Nadu	Tiruvarur	2009	2009	General	
Indian Maritime University	Tamil Nadu	Chennai	2008	2008	Marine science	
English and Foreign Languages University	Telangana	Hyderabad	2007	1958	English and foreign languages	
Maulana Azad National Urdu University	Telangana	Hyderabad	1998	1998	Urdu	
University of Hyderabad	Telangana	Hyderabad	1974	1974	General	
Sammakka Sarakka Central Tribal University	Telangana	Mulugu	2023	2023	General	
Tripura University	Tripura	Agartala	1987	1987	General	
Aligarh Muslim University	Uttar Pradesh	Aligarh	1920	1920	General	
University of Allahabad	Uttar Pradesh	Prayagraj	2005	1887	General	
Babasaheb Bhimrao Ambedkar University	Uttar Pradesh	Lucknow	1996	1996	General	
Banaras Hindu University	Uttar Pradesh	Varanasi	1916	1916	General	
Rajiv Gandhi National Aviation University	Uttar Pradesh	Raebareli	2013	2013	Aviation science	
Rani Lakshmi Bai Central Agricultural University	Uttar Pradesh	Jhansi	2014	2014	Agriculture	
Hemwati Nandan Bahuguna Garhwal University	Uttarakhand	Srinagar	2009	1973	General	
Visva-Bharati University	West Bengal	Shantiniketan	1951	1921	General	

== See also ==
- List of universities in India
- List of state universities in India
- List of deemed universities in India
- List of private universities in India
- List of autonomous higher education institutes in India
