= Mahatma Gandhi Antarrashtriya Hindi Vishwavidyalaya =

Central university in Wardha, Maharashtra, India

Coordinates: 20°45′52″N 78°35′18″E

- Motto: Gyan Shanti Maitri
- Motto in English: Knowledge Peace Friendship
- Type: Central University
- Established: 1997 (29 years ago)
- Affiliations: UGC
- Chancellor: President of India
- Vice-Chancellor: Kumud Sharma
- Location: Wardha, Maharashtra, India
- Campus: Rural
- Website: official website

Mahatma Gandhi Antarrashtriya Hindi Vishwavidyalaya is a central university located in Wardha, Maharashtra, India.

== History ==
The university began through an Act of Parliament which received the assent of the President on 8 January 1997. The purpose of the act was to establish and incorporate a teaching university for the promotion and development of Hindi language and literature, through teaching and research, with a view to enabling Hindi to achieve greater functional efficiency and recognition as a major international language.
