= Central University of Gujarat =

Central university in Vadodara, Gujarat, India

- Other name: CUG
- Type: Public Central Research University
- Established: 2009; 17 years ago
- Accreditation: NAAC (Grade 'A+')
- Affiliations: UGC, NAAC, ACU
- Chancellor: Dr. Hasmukh Adhia, IAS (Retd.)
- Vice-Chancellor: Vijita Singh Aggarwal
- Visitor: President of India
- Location: Village - Kundhela, Taluka - Dabhoi, Vadodara, Gujarat, 391107, India; 22.1999167°N 73.2666106°E
- Campus: 100 acres (40 ha); Rural
- Language: English
- Website: www.cug.ac.in

Central University of Gujarat is a Public Central Research University in Kundhela Village, Dabhoi Taluka, Vadodara, Gujarat, India, offering courses at undergraduate, postgraduate, and doctoral levels. Prof. Vijita Singh Aggarwal is the current Vice-Chancellor of CUG.

The university includes 11 schools, 16 academic departments, and 3 centres.

== Organization & Governance ==
The Central University of Gujarat has eleven schools in different disciplines with various departments within them. It has three Centres also.

=== Schools & Centres ===
The university has 11specialized schools imparting education in various fields. Some schools have further specialized centres within them.

- School of Applied Material Science (SAMS)
- School of Chemical Sciences (SCS)
- School of Education (SE)
  - Department of Studies in Research and Education(CSRE)
- School of Environment and Sustainable Development (SESD)
- School of International Studies (SIS)
  - Politics & International Relations (School level) (PIR) Established in 2012, the PIR-SIS offers postgraduate course in Politics & International Relations.
  - Department of International Politics (DIP) offers doctoral programme in International politics.
- School of Language, Literature and Culture Studies (SLLCS)
  - Department of German Studies (DGS) offers undergraduate, postgraduate, and doctoral courses in German language, people, and culture.
  - Department of Comparative Literature and Translation Studies (DCLTS)
  - Department of English Studies (DES)
  - Department of Hindi Language & Literature (DHLL)
  - Department of Gujarati Language & Literature (DGLL)
  - Department of Chinese Studies (DCS)
- School of Library & Information Sciences (SLIS)
- School of Life Sciences (SLS)
- School of Nano Sciences (SNS)
- School of National Security Studies (SNSS)
  - Department of Security Studies (DSS)
  - Department of Strategic Technologies (Cyber/Space) (DST)
  - Department of Maritime Security
- School of Social Sciences (SSS)
  - Department of Studies in Social Management (DSSM)
  - Department of Studies in Society and Development (DSSD)
  - Department of Studies in Science, Technology and Innovation policy (DSSTIP)
  - Department of Studies in Economics and Planning (DSEP)
  - Department of Gandhian Thought and Peace Studies (DGTPS)

==== Special Centre ====
- Centre for Diaspora Studies (CDS)
- Centre for Health Culture and Personality Development (CHCPD)
- Dr. Ambedkar Centre for Excellence (DACE)

== 2009 Bill ==
The Central Universities Bill 2009 aims at creating one new central university each in Bihar, Gujarat, Haryana, Himachal Pradesh, Jammu and Kashmir, Jharkhand, Karnataka, Kerala, Odisha, Punjab, Rajasthan and Tamil Nadu.

It also seeks to convert Guru Ghasidas Vishwavidyalaya in Chhattisgarh, Harisingh Gour Vishwavidyalaya in Sagar (Madhya Pradesh) and Hemwati Nandan Bahuguna Garhwal University in Uttarakhand into Central universities.

== See also ==
- Central University, India
- School of Library and Information Science
