= Panchanpur, Gaya =

Coordinates: 24°54′N 84°51′E

Panchanpur, Gaya, is a village in the Indian state of Bihar. It is on the state highway which connects Gaya to Tekari, 6 km from Tekari sub-divisional office and 18 km from Gaya.
