= E-ShodhSindhu =

Library Consortium in India

e-ShodhSindhu (also known as e-ShodhSindhu Consortium for Higher Education Electronics) is a program initiated by India's Ministry of Education aimed at granting academic institutions affordable access to high-quality electronic resources, which encompass full-text documents, bibliographic databases, and factual databases.

== History ==
In December 2015, the e-ShodhSindhu was established through the amalgamation of three consortia: the University Grants Commission-INFONET Digital Library Consortium, National Library and Information Services Infrastructure for Scholarly Content (NLIST), and Indian National Digital library in Engineering, Sciences and Technology-All India Council for Technical Education (INDEST-AICTE) Consortium. The erstwhile Ministry of HRD (now known as the Ministry of Education) endorsed this merger on the advice of an Expert Committee.
