= Central University of South Bihar =

Central university in Gaya, Bihar, India

Coordinates: 25.5974°N 85.0875°E

- Motto: ज्ञान सेवा विमुक्तये
- Type: Central University
- Established: January 15, 2009; 17 years ago
- Accreditation: NAAC with Grade A++
- Affiliations: UGC, AICTE, BCI, ICSSR, NCTE
- Chancellor: Dr. C. P. Thakur
- Vice-Chancellor: Dr. Kameshwar Nath Singh
- Visitor: President of India
- Location: Gaya, Bihar, India
- Website: cusb.ac.in

Central University of South Bihar (CUSB) is one of the sixteen newly established Central Universities by the Government of India under the Central Universities Act, 2009 (Section 25 of 2009). The university is located at Panchanpur, Gaya, Bihar, India. On 27 February 2014, Lok Sabha Speaker Meira Kumar laid the foundation stone for the permanent campus in Gaya. When completed, it will be spread in a 300-acre campus at Panchanpur. Currently further construction is ongoing. Dr. C. P. Thakur is now the newly appointed Chancellor by President of India and Kameshwar Nath Singh is the vice chancellor. CUSB is NAAC Accredited 'A++' grade university.

== Organisation and administration ==
=== Governance ===
The president of India is the visitor of the university. The chancellor is the ceremonial head of the university, while the executive powers rest with the vice-chancellor. The court, the executive council, the academic council, the board of studies and the finance committee are the administrative authorities of the university.

The University Court is the supreme authority of the university and has the power to review, the broad policies and programmes of the university and to suggest measures for the improvement and development of the university; the executive council is the highest executive body of the university. The academic council is the highest academic body of the university and is responsible for the co-ordination and exercising general supervision over the academic policies of the university. It has the right to advise the executive council on all academic matters. The finance committee is responsible for recommending financial policies, goals, and budgets.

The current chancellor is Dr. C. P. Thakur, former member of the Rajya Sabha. and Dr. Kameshwar Nath Singh is the current vice-chancellor.

Convocation ceremony organized in Central University of South Bihar after seven years. President Draupadi Murmu will attend this program as the chief guest.

== Academics ==
The university offers postgraduate and undergraduate programmes in various fields. Admission used to be through 'Central Universities Common Entrance Test' (CUCET), and in addition, in some cases, interview or group discussions. Now the university takes admissions through an all India common entrance test re-christened as Common University Entrance Test (CUET), conducted by the National Testing Agency (NTA), across cities in India at viable examination centres.

=== Schools ===
The university consists of the following schools:

1. School of Earth, Biological and Environmental Sciences
  - Centre for Earth Sciences(Department of Geology)
  - Centre for Biological Sciences
  - Department of Geography
  - Centre for Environmental Sciences
2. School of Human Sciences
  - Centre for Psychological Sciences
3. School of Languages and Literature
  - Centre for Foreign Languages
  - Centre for Indian Languages
4. School of Mathematics, Statistics and Computer Science
  - Department of Computer Science
  - Department of Mathematics
  - Department of Statistics
5. School of Media, Art & Aesthetics
6. School of Social Sciences and Policy
  - Centre for Development Studies
  - Centre for Economic Studies and Policies
  - Centre for Historical Studies and Archaeology
  - Centre for Political Studies
    - This centre offers a 2-year integrated M.A. programme in political science and international relations.
    - Ph.D. in political science and international relations
  - Centre for Sociological Studies
7. School of Education
  - Centre for Education
8. School of Law and Governance
  - The school of law and governance offers three courses now:
    - 5-year integrated B.A. LL.B. (Hons.) programme
    - LL.M. one-year programme (as per UGC 2013 Regulation)
    - Ph.D. in law

9. Department of Pharmacy (School of Health Sciences)
