= Central Tribal University of Andhra Pradesh =

Central university in Andhra Pradesh, India

- Type: Central Tribal university
- Established: 2019; 7 years ago
- Affiliations: UGC
- Chancellor: Madan Lal Meena
- Vice-Chancellor: Tantravahi Srinivasan (I/C)
- Visitor: President of India
- Location: Marrivalasa, Vizianagaram district, Andhra Pradesh, India; 18.142°N 83.397°E
- Campus: Urban
- Website: www.ctuap.ac.in

Central Tribal University of Andhra Pradesh (CTUAP) is an Indian Central University yet to be located in Marrivalasa, Vizianagaram district of Andhra Pradesh, India. As of 2021, it is operating from a transit campus, and its final location is yet to be finalised.

== History ==
The establishment of CTUAP by the central government was required under the thirteenth schedule to the Andhra Pradesh Reorganisation Act, 2014.

In 2015 the university has been allotted 525 acres of land in Relli Village, Vizianagaram district by the Government of Andhra Pradesh. The union cabinet has sanctioned ₹834 crore (US$87 million) for the construction of the university, out of which ₹420 crore (US$44 million) were sanctioned for the first phase of construction. The Andhra University campus in Kondakarakam village, Vizianagaram district has been identified as transit campus to begin the academic and administrative activities for the academic year 2019–20 and the CTUAP will be moved to its own building in Relli village upon completion of its own buildings. Andhra University was assigned the position of mentor university.

In 2019 the university was officially established, through the Central Universities (Amendment) Act, 2019. In August 2020, T.V. Kattimani was appointed the first vice-chancellor of the university.

As of January 2021, the final location of the university has not been finalised. A parcel of land that was identified in Kuntinavalasa in Mentada mandal was found satisfactory by the officials who visited it, although this is not the only location proposed, and other locations are considered at Pachipenta mandal, at Chinnamedapalli in Mentada mandal and at Marrivalasa in Dattirajeru mandal.

== Governance ==
The university is governed by the rules set by the Central Universities Act, 2009. The president of India is the visitor of the university. The chancellor is the ceremonial head of the university while the executive powers rest with the vice-chancellor. The court, the executive council, the academic council, the board of studies and the finance committee are the administrative authorities of the university.

The university court is the supreme authority of the university and has the power to review, the broad policies and programmes of the university and to suggest measures for the improvement and development of the university; The executive council is the highest executive body of the University. The academic council is the highest academic body of the university and is responsible for the co-ordination and exercising general supervision over the academic policies of the university. It has the right to advise the executive council on all academic matters. The finance committee is responsible for recommending financial policies, goals, and budgets.

== Academics ==
CTUAP offers postgraduate, integrated and diploma courses. Admission is through an entrance exam conducted by Central Universities Common Entrance Test (CUCET).
