= Central University of Andhra Pradesh =

University in Andhra Pradesh, India

- Other name: CUAP
- Motto: Vidya Dadati Vinayam
- Motto in English: Education gives Humility
- Type: Central university
- Established: 2018; 8 years ago
- Affiliations: UGC
- Chancellor: Shankar Acharya
- Vice-Chancellor: C. Sheela Reddy (I/C)
- Visitor: President of India
- Faculty: 120
- Administrative staff: 240
- Students: 2,400+
- Undergraduates: 1800+
- Postgraduates: 240+
- Location: Anantapur district, Andhra Pradesh, India; 14°45′08.70″N 77°39′08.28″E
- Campus: Urban
- Website: cuap.ac.in

Central University of Andhra Pradesh (CU-AP) is a central university located in Anantapur, Andhra Pradesh, India.

== History ==
In 2014 the bifurcation of Andhra Pradesh was enacted through the Andhra Pradesh Reorganisation Act, 2014. The act mandated the Government of India to establish Institutes of National Importance, one of which to be a central university, in the residual state of Andhra Pradesh. The union cabinet has approved the university in May 2018, sanctioning ₹450 crore (US$48 million) to the project. The University of Hyderabad (UoH) has been selected to mentor the new university in June 2018. A bill was approved in July 2018 and the transit campus of the university, at the IT Business Incubation Centre, Jawaharlal Nehru Technological University, Anantapur, was inaugurated in August 2018. 491.3 acres (198.8 ha) of land were assigned for building a permanent campus. The Central Universities (Amendment) Bill, 2019 was introduced to the Lok Sabha in July 2019 and passed in both houses in that same month. The Central Universities (Amendment) Act, 2019 was published in August 2019, officially establishing the university.

== Governance ==
The university is governed by the rules set by the Central Universities Act, 2009. The president of India is the visitor of the university. The chancellor is the ceremonial head of the university while the executive powers rest with the vice-chancellor. The court, the executive council, the academic council, the board of studies and the finance committee are the administrative authorities of the university.

The university court is the supreme authority of the university and has the power to review, the broad policies and programmes of the university and to suggest measures for the improvement and development of the university; The executive council is the highest executive body of the University. The academic council is the highest academic body of the university and is responsible for the co-ordination and exercising general supervision over the academic policies of the university. It has the right to advise the executive council on all academic matters. The finance committee is responsible for recommending financial policies, goals, and budgets.

== Academics ==
CUAP offers courses towards B.Tech. in various disciplines along with B.A. (Hons.) and B.Sc. (Hons.) degrees in various fields of arts, humanities and social sciences. It also offers various B.A. (vocational studies) courses and M.A. degrees in languages. the programmes are semester based and use the Choice Based Credit System (CBCS).
