= Central University of Kerala =

Central University in Kerala, India

Central University of Keralam
- Motto: Amritam Tu Vidya
- Motto in English: Knowledge is Eternal
- Type: Central University
- Established: 2009; 17 years ago
- Chancellor: S. V. Seshagiri Rao
- Vice-Chancellor: Siddu Payappa Algur
- Visitor: President of India
- Location: Kasaragod, Keralam, India; 12.393°N 75.092°E
- Campus: Suburban
- Language: English and Hindi
- Website: www.cukerala.ac.in

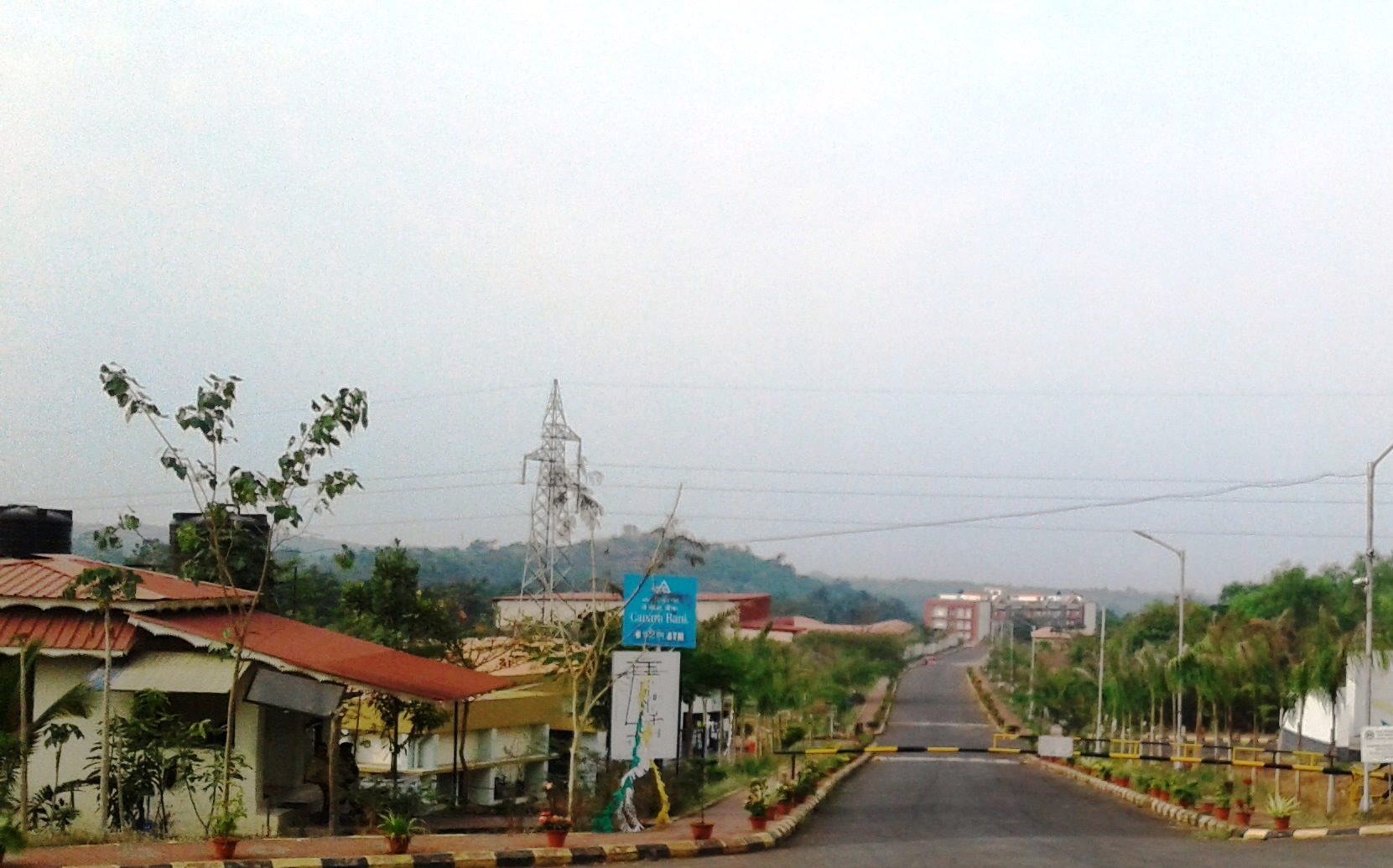
Central University Periya

The Central University of Keralam (CUKeralam) is located in Periya, on the Tejaswini Hills, in Kasaragod, the northernmost district of Keralam, India.The main campus is 9.8 km from Kanhangad and 20 km south of Kasaragod. The university began at a temporary campus in Vidyanagar, with its humanities schools and other facilities.

The university was established under The Central Universities Act, 2009, which created 15 central universities in India for teaching and research.

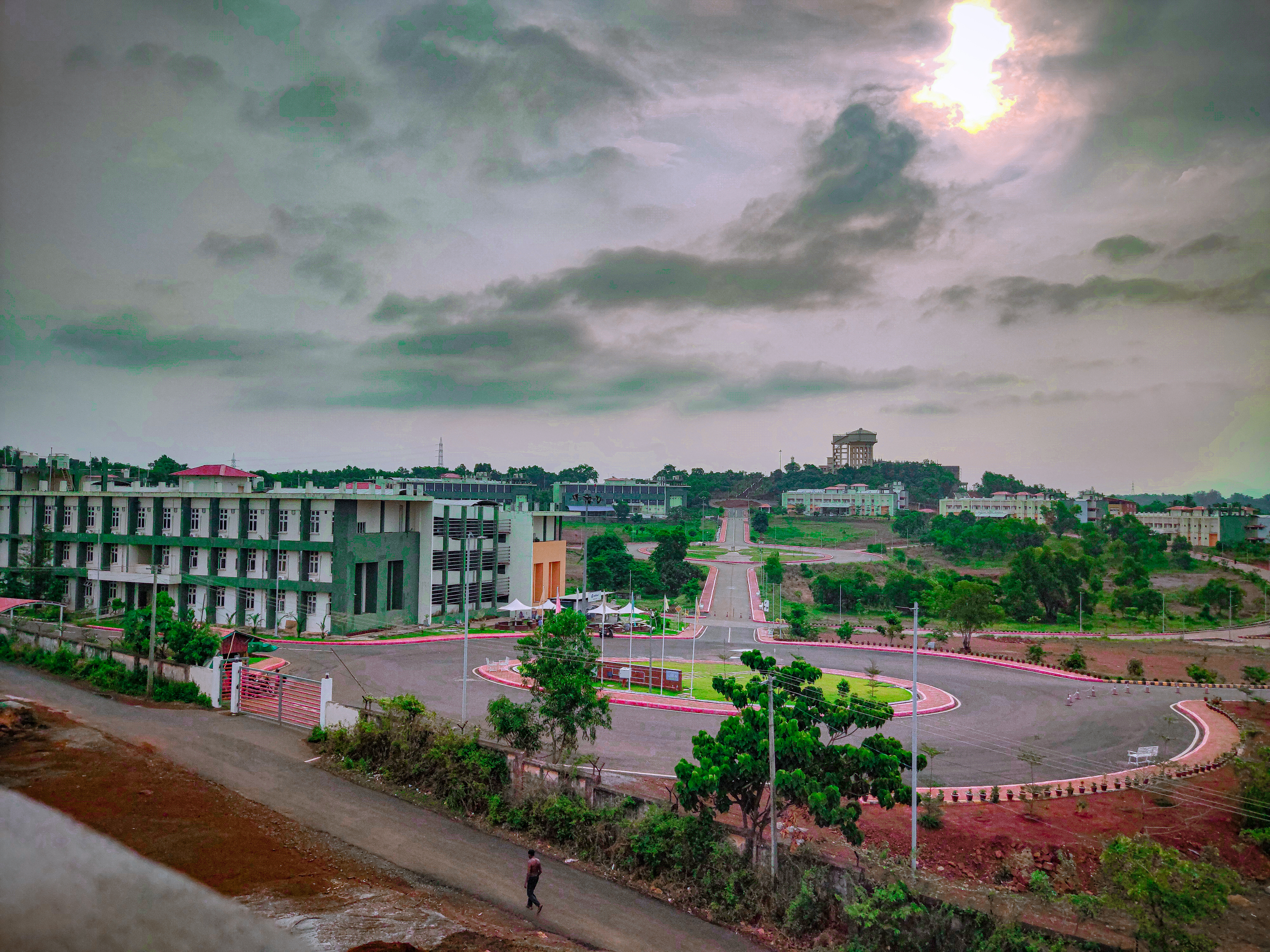
Central University of Kerala, Kasaragod

== Organisation and administration ==
=== Schools and departments ===
School of Biological Sciences

- Department of Biochemistry and Molecular Biology
- Department of Genomic Science
- Department of Plant Science
- Department of Zoology

School of Business Studies

- Department of Commerce & International Business
- Department of Management Studies
- Department of Tourism Studies

School of Cultural Studies

- Mahathma Ayyankali Centre for Kerala Studies

School of Earth Science Systems

- Department of Environmental Science
- Department of Geology

School of Economics

- Department of Economics

School of Education

- Department of Education
- E Sreedharan Centre for Life Skills Education

School of Global Studies

- Department of International Relations (Capital Centre, Trivandrum)
- Department of International Relations and Politics

School of Languages and Comparative Literatures

- Department of English and Comparative Literature
- Department of Hindi
- Department of Kannada
- Department of Linguistics
- Department of Malayalam

School of Legal Studies

- Department of Law (Thiruvalla campus)

School of Medicine and Public Health

- Department of Public Health and Community Medicine
- Department of Yoga

School of Physical Sciences

- Department of Chemistry
- Department of Computer Science
- Department of Mathematics
- Department of Physics

School of Social Sciences

- Department of Public Administration and Policy Studies
- Department of Social Work

== Academics ==
=== Academic programmes ===
==== Undergraduate programs ====
The university offers an 8-semester BA (Hons.) program in International Relations, at its Capital Center Campus in Thiruvananthapuram. It is the only institution in Kerala offering this program.

Academic year 2023-24 onwards, the university also began a four-year Integrated Teacher Education Program (ITEP), which includes BA-B.Ed., BSc-B.Ed., and BCom-B.Ed. The ITEP consists of eight semesters, covering field-based experiences, teaching practice, and internships. The program includes general studies such as Mathematics, Science, Social Sciences, Humanities, and Commerce, along with professional studies in education, curriculum, and teaching methods.

CUK has unveiled three dynamic four-year honors program for the 2025-26 academic session. The courses -- BSc (Hons) Biology with Research, BCom (Hons) Financial Analytics and BCA (Hons) -- are aimed to equip students with specialized skills for emerging global opportunities and dynamic market environment.

==== Postgraduate programs ====
The duration of the postgraduate programme is 4 semesters. Each semester has a duration of 16–18 weeks, with 5 working days and 30 instructional hours per week.

The programmes are organised under Choice Based Credit and Semester (CBCS) pattern. Students are offered two types of courses:

- Core courses, identified by each department, providing a broad base in the subject of study;
- Elective courses, chosen by the students in consultation with the Faculty Advisor.

In addition to these, each student does a Dissertation/Project emphasising the application of knowledge to real problems. The minimum total credits required for the successful completion of a PG programme is 72 credits within 4 semesters. Out of the 72 credits, a student has to secure a minimum of 48 but not more than 60 credits, including that of the Dissertation for Core courses, and a minimum of 12 but not more than 24 credits for Elective courses.

==== Ph.D programme ====
Most of the departments of the university offers Ph.D. programmes. KILA is the research center of International Relations & Political Science

=== Rankings ===
NIRF has ranked the university in the 101-150 band in University rankings and in 151-200 band in the Overall category in 2024.

University and college rankings

General – India
- NIRF (Overall) (2024): 151-200
- NIRF (Universities) (2024): 101-150

== Student life ==
=== Cankama ===
Cankama- The Art Festival of CUK is the most important cultural event of campus which consist of three days of competitions where students compete under each school. Cankama was started in 2015 by then students council and ever since this stands as the most important event of CUK students' life.

=== Scholarships/Financial Support ===
CUK used to offer scholarships to its PG Students. It was withdrawn from the 2017 academic year onwards despite student protest.

=== Hostel Facility ===
As of 2024-25, the Central University of Kerala Periya campus has adequate accommodation facilities with separate hostels for girls and boys. The men's hostel block is situated right outside the University compound and consists of three functional hostels. The four ladies' hostels are within the University enclosures. More hostels are under construction and nearing completion. .

=== Transportation Facility ===
Transport is available to all students from their hostels to the university campuses at subsidised rates.

=== University Library ===
Central University of Kerala has a full-fledged library at Sindhu Block featuring newspapers, magazines, and a vast collection of books across genres. The library includes a computer lab that has access to most major and minor research publications as well as offers services like plagiarism checking, printing services, etc. The construction of a dedicated Central Library Building is nearing completion.

=== Students’ Council ===
The Students’ Council is a student body comprising 54 student representatives of which all members are elected through elections conducted in 27 constituencies. Voters of each constituency are students of undergraduate and postgraduate programs and research scholars. The council also has an executive committee composed of 10 members. The President, two Vice Presidents, the General Secretary, two Joint Secretaries and four Executive Committee Members are the office bearers of the Students’ Council.

== Image gallery ==
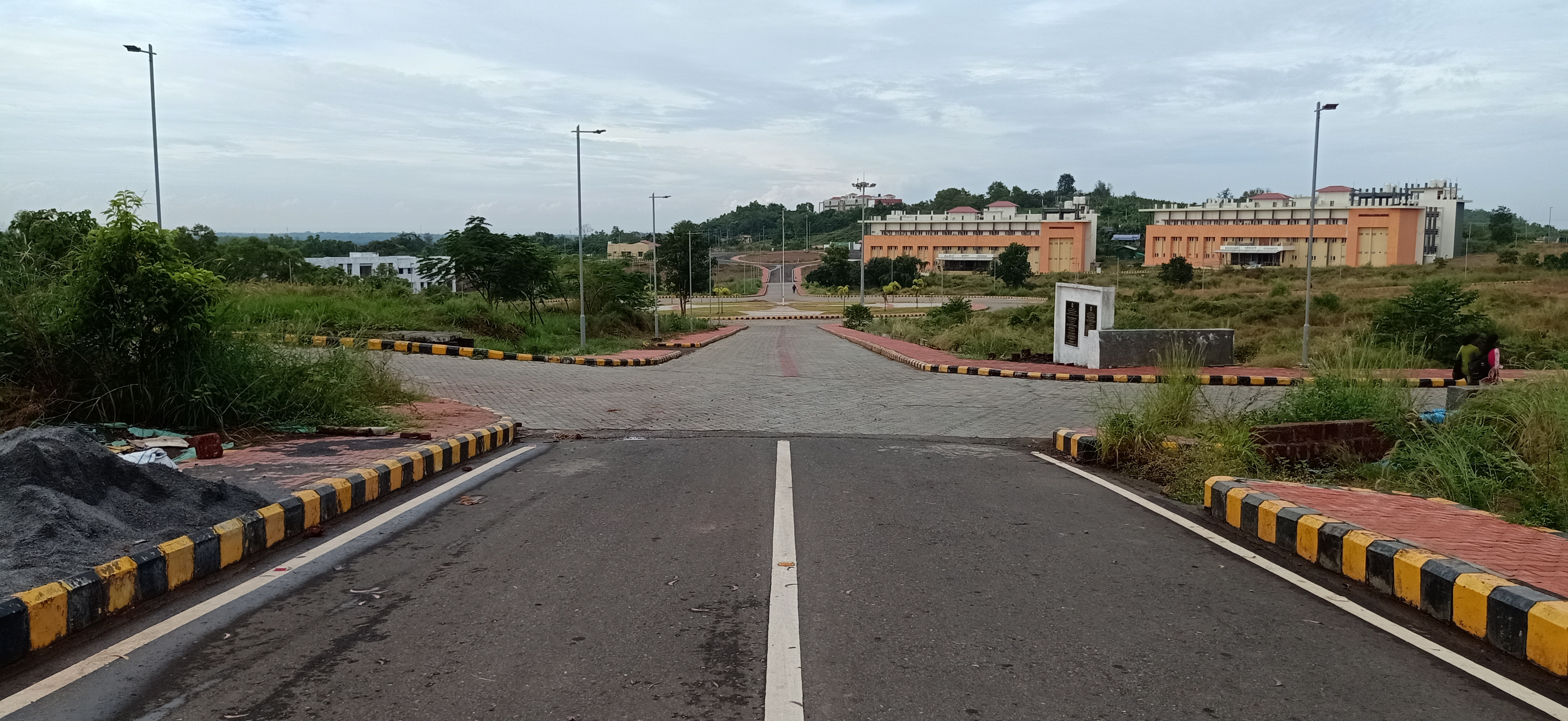
campus view

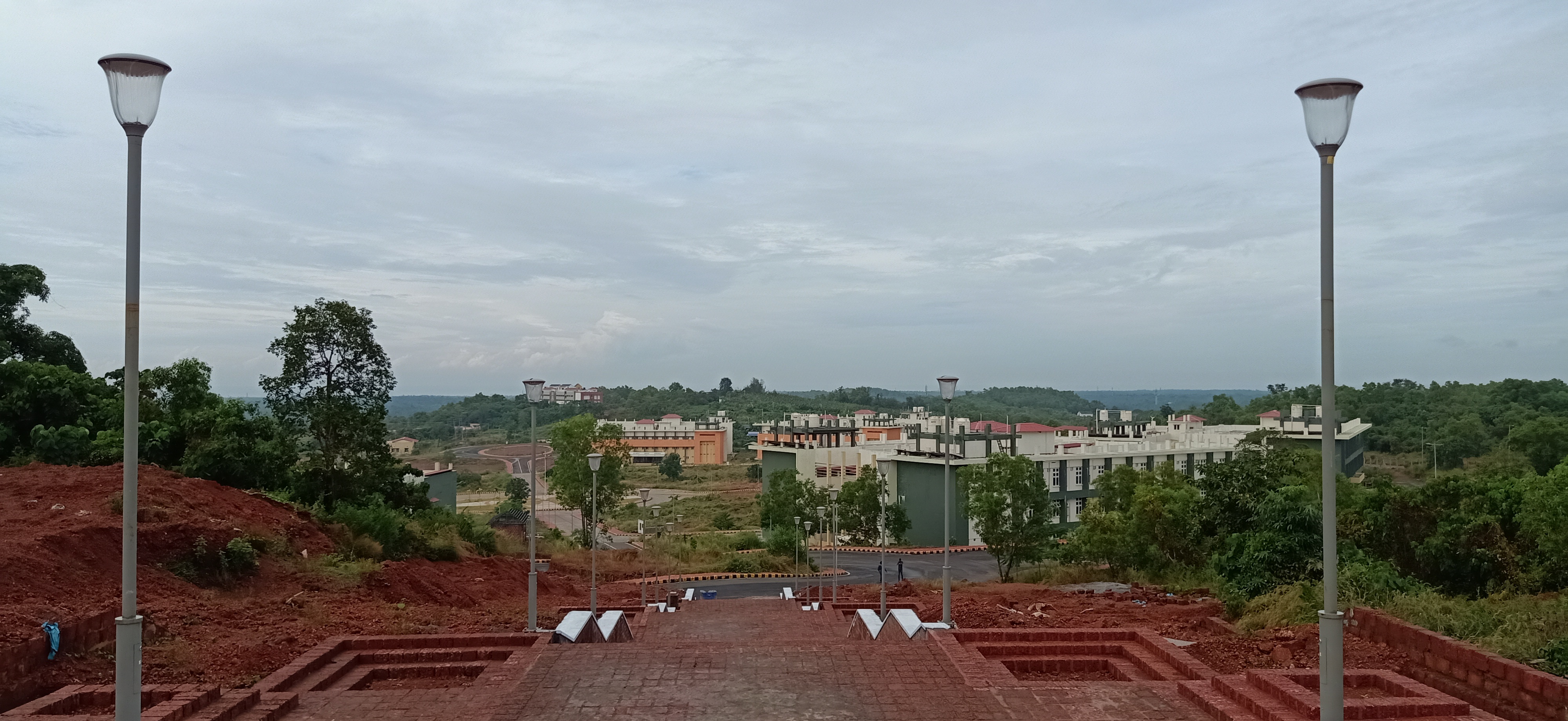
Central University of Kerala Campus view

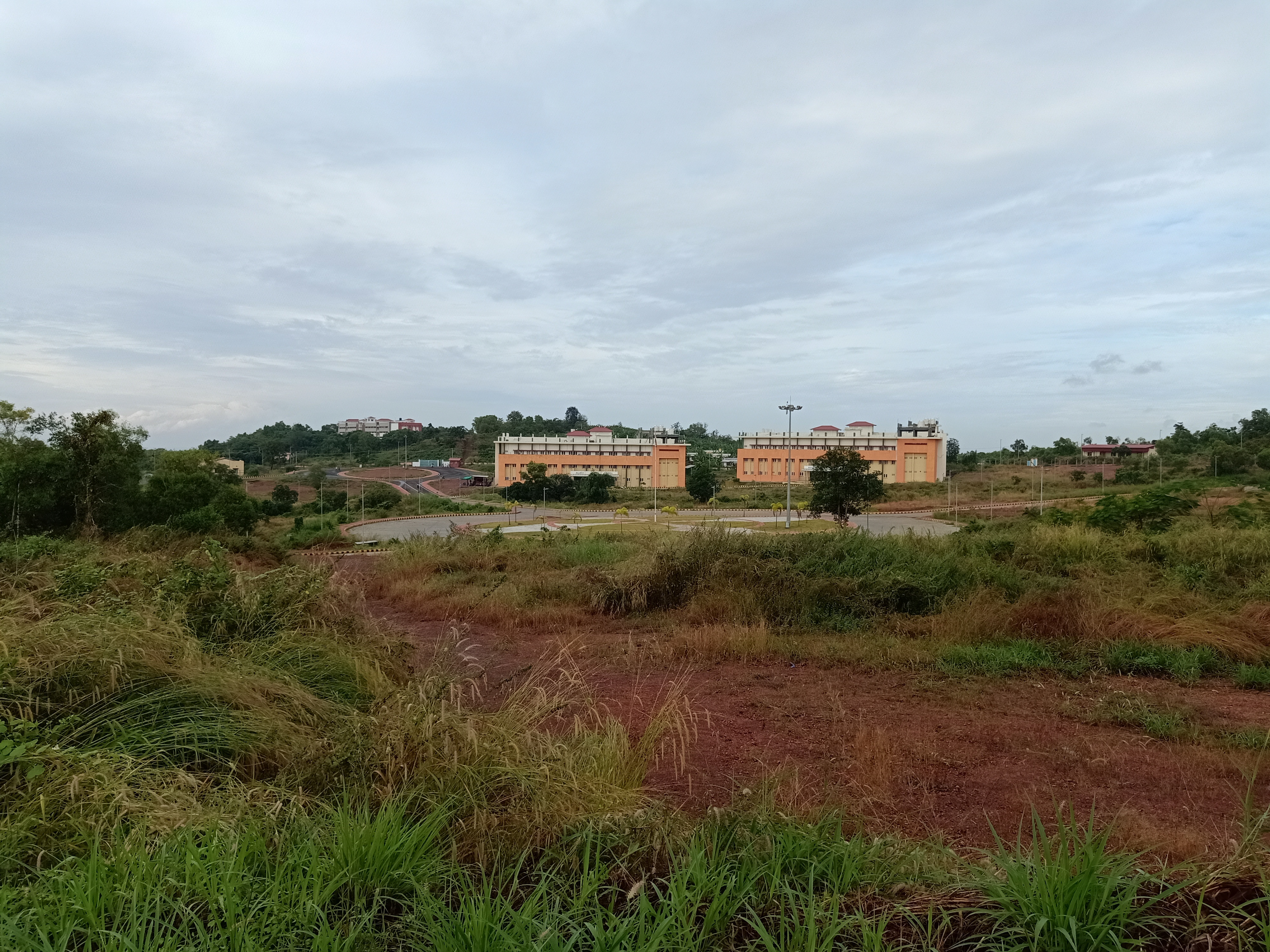
Central University of Kerala Campus

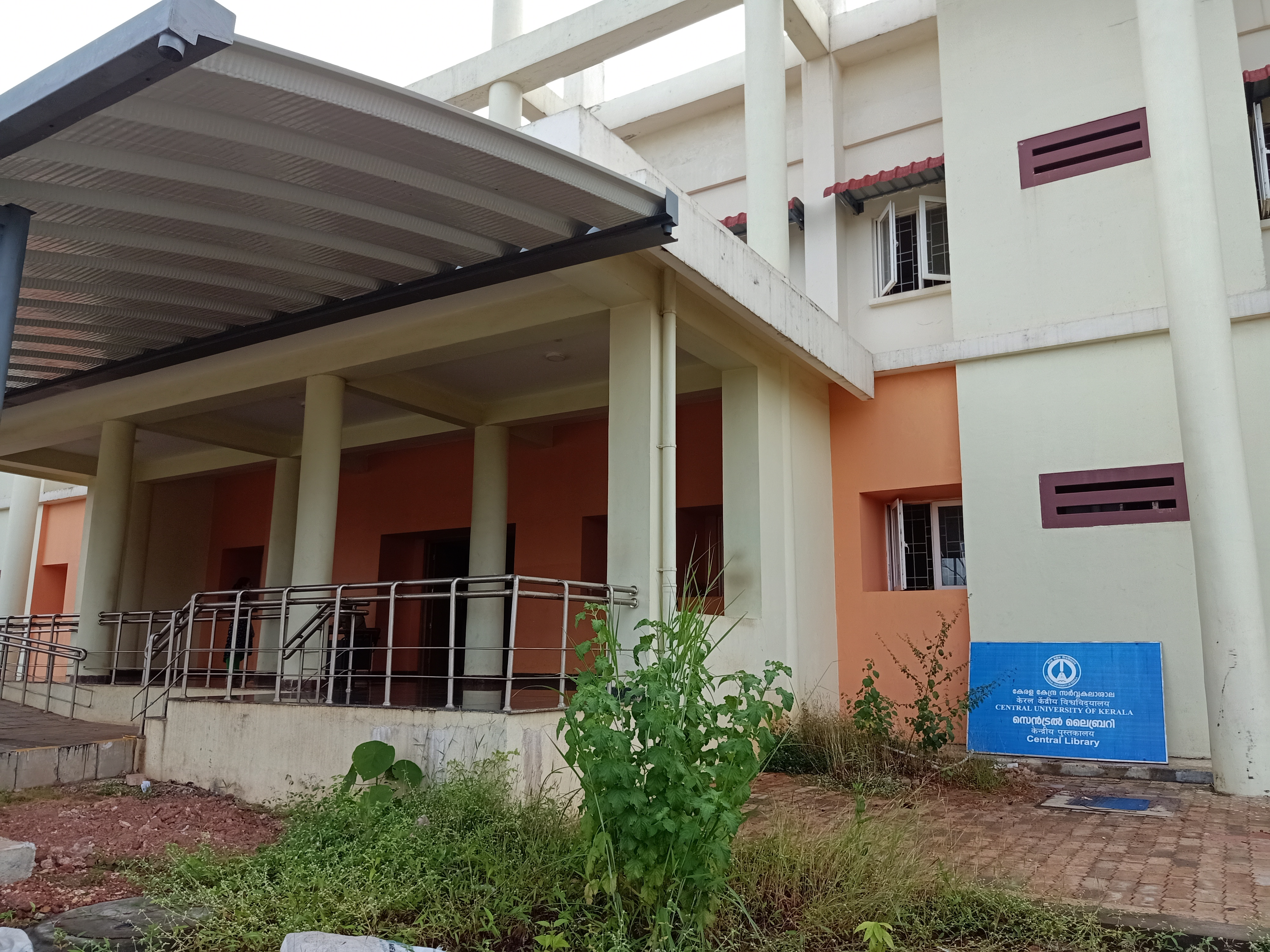
Central University of Kerala Campus central Library

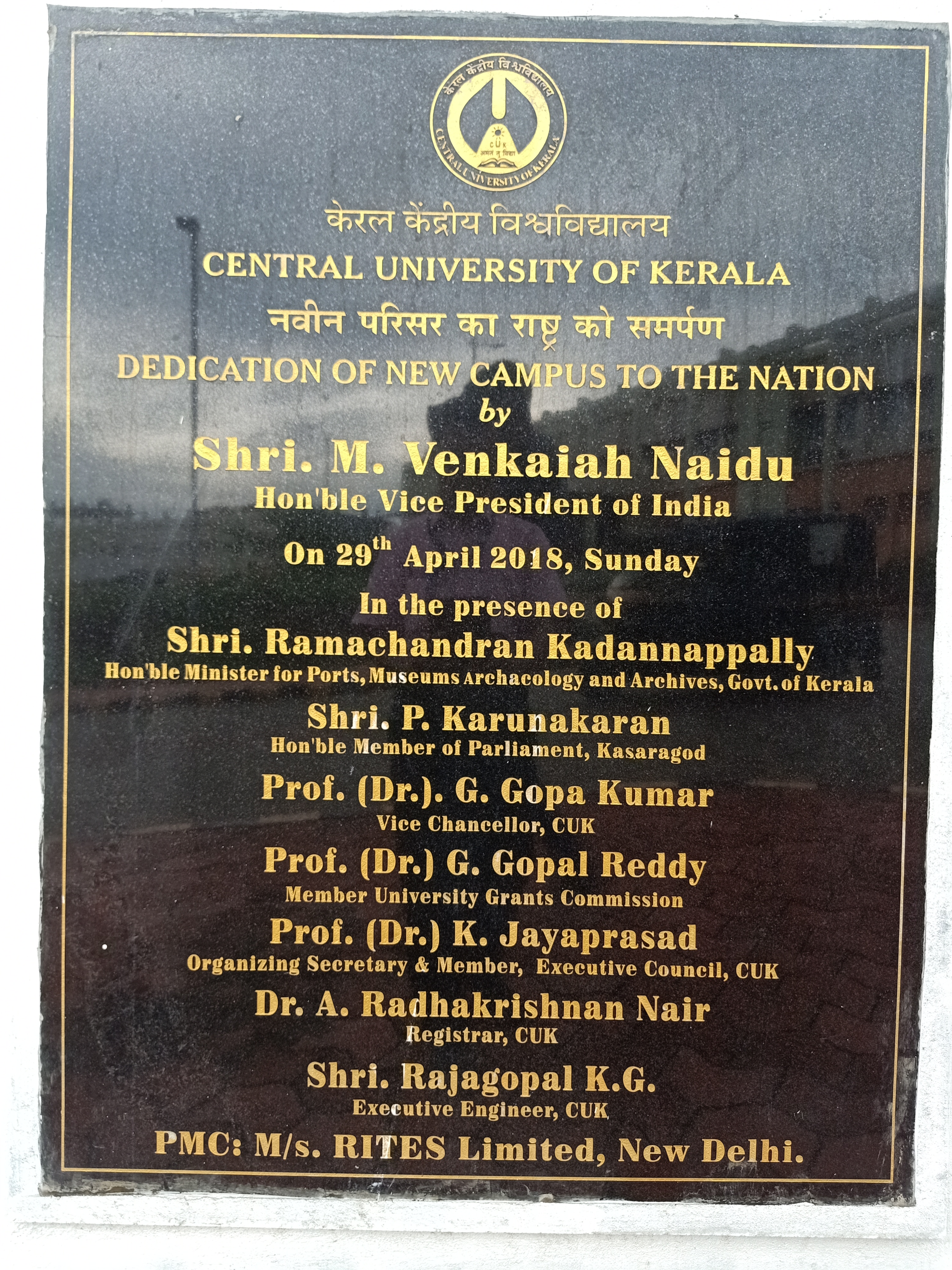
Central University of Kerala-Foundation stone

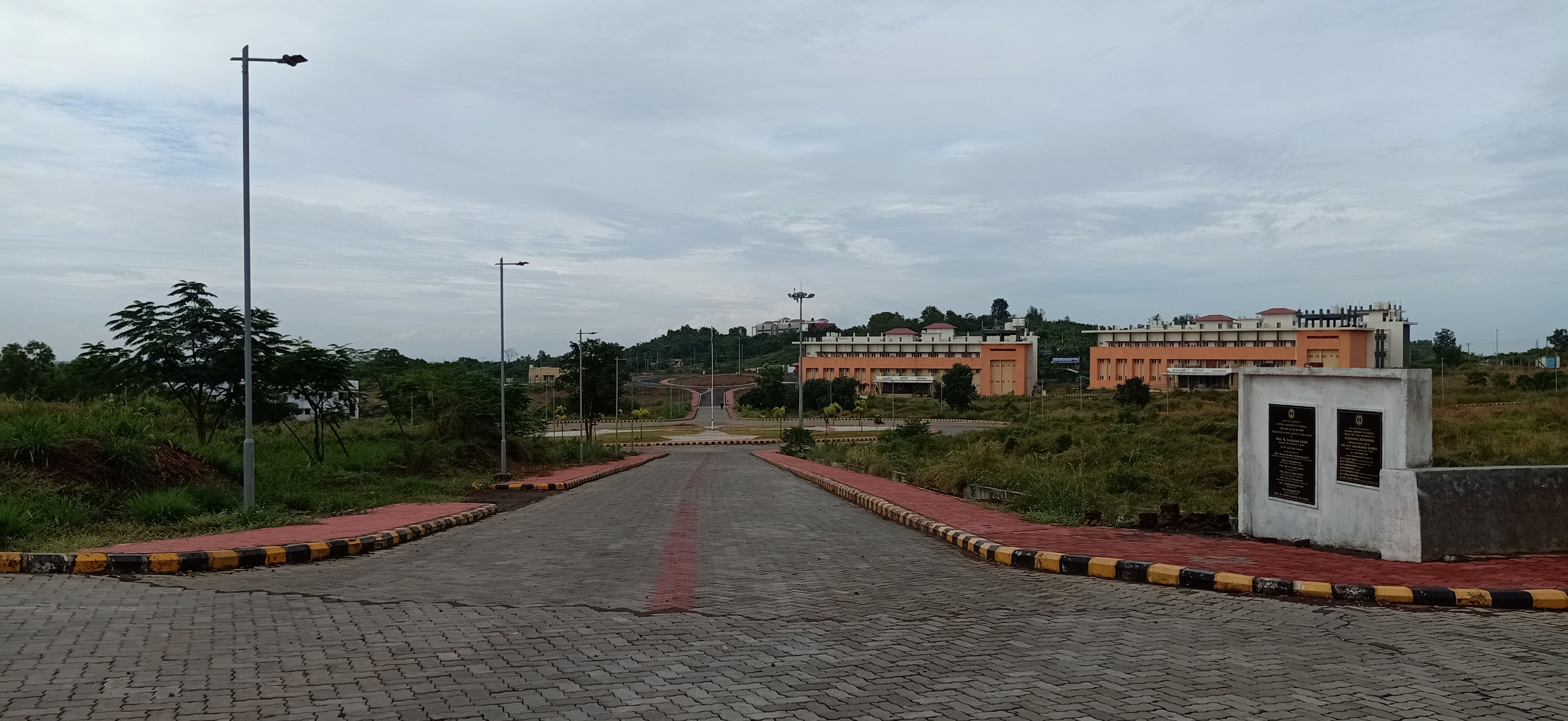
Central University of Kerala Campus
