= Central University of Karnataka =

Central University in Kalaburagi, Karnataka, India

- Other name: CUK
- Motto: IAST: vidyA dadAti vinayaM
- Type: Central University
- Established: 2009 (17 years ago)
- Accreditation: UGC
- Affiliations: AIU
- Chancellor: Vijay Keshav Gokhale
- Vice-Chancellor: Battu Satyanarayana
- Visitor: President of India
- Location: Kalaburagi, Karnataka, India; 17.4348°N 76.6730°E
- Website: www.cuk.ac.in

The Central University of Karnataka, (CUK), is a central university situated in Kadaganchi village in the Aland taluka of Kalaburagi district in the Indian state of Karnataka. It was established by an Act of the Parliament of India in 2009, "The Central Universities Act, 2009".

== History ==
The university started operating from its permanent campus at the Gulbarga-Waghdhari inter-state highway in Aland taluka identified by the Karnataka State Government.

The Central Universities Bill 2009 aimed at creating a new central university each in Bihar, Gujarat, Haryana, Himachal Pradesh, Jammu and Kashmir, Jharkhand, Karnataka, Kerala, Orissa, Punjab, Rajasthan and Tamil Nadu. It also sought to convert Guru Ghasidas Vishwavidyalaya in Chhattisgarh, Harisingh Gour Vishwavidyalaya in Sagar (Madhya Pradesh) and Hemwati Nandan Bahuguna Garhwal University in Uttarakhand into Central universities.

== Schools and Departments ==
- School of Business Studies
  - Department of Business Studies
  - Department of Commerce
  - Department of Economic Studies and Planning
  - Department of Tourism and Hotel Management
- School of Earth Sciences
  - Department of Geography
  - Department of Geology
- School of Education and Training
- School of Humanities and Languages
  - Department of English
  - Department of Hindi
  - Department of Kannada Literature and Culture
  - Department of Linguistics
  - Department of Foreign Language Studies
  - Department of Music and Fine Arts
- School of Social and Behavioral Sciences
  - Department of History & Archaeology
  - Department of Psychology
  - Department of Public Administration
  - Department of Social Work
  - Department of Folklore and Tribal Studies
- School of Media Studies
  - Department of Mass Communication and Journalism
- School of Computer Science
  - Department of Computer Science
- School of Chemical Sciences
  - Department of Chemistry
- School of Life Sciences
  - Department of Life Sciences
- School of Physical Sciences
  - Department of Mathematics
  - Department of Physics
- School of Engineering
  - Department of Electrical Engineering
  - Department of Electronics and Communication Engineering
- School of Legal Jurisprudence Studies
  - Department of Law

== See also ==
- Central University, India
