= Gati Shakti Vishwavidyalaya =

Central university in Vadodara, Gujarat, India

- Motto: adamyam utkṛṣṭatāyāḥ anusaraṇam
- Motto in English: Relentless Pursuit of Excellence
- Type: Central University Under the Ministry of Railways
- Established: August 2022
- Chancellor: Shri Ashwini Vaishnaw - Shri Ashwini Vaishnaw Hon. Minister of Railways, Information & Broadcasting , Electronics and Information Technology, GoI
- Vice-Chancellor: Prof.Dr. Manoj Choudhary
- Visitor: Smt. Droupadi Murmu, the Honorable President of India
- Location: Lalbaug, Manjalpur, Vadodara, Gujarat 390004, Vadodara, Gujarat, India
- Campus: 55 acres; Urban
- Website: gsv.ac.in

Gati Shakti Vishwavidyalaya (GSV) is a Central University located in Vadodara, Gujarat, India. The university was established by an Act of Parliament in August 2022 with a mandate focused on education, training and research in the transportation and logistics sectors. It operates under the Ministry of Railways, Government of India. The university offers academic programmes and executive education in areas related to transportation, logistics, supply chain management, infrastructure and associated technologies. Its academic approach incorporates aspects of technology, management and public policy.

== History ==
In 2017, the Cabinet of India led by Prime Minister Narendra Modi approved the setting up of India's first university exclusively focused on transport-related education, multidisciplinary research and training, called National Rail and Transportation Institute (NRTI). It was established in 2018. The university's mandate encompasses multiple modes of transport and related areas, including railways, roads, ports, shipping, aviation and logistics. The university was established in August 2022 through an Act of Parliament and became operational on 6 December 2022.

The university's mandate covers the transportation and logistics ecosystem through multidisciplinary education, executive training, skilling and research across technology, management and policy. GSV follows a demand-driven curriculum intended to align academic programmes with requirements of the transportation sector. Its academic activities are supported by faculty with global exposure and access to infrastructure associated with the Centralised Training Institutes of Indian Railways.

== University Logo ==
Elements of the logo design:

- Symbols representing all modes of transportation (Land, Water, Air), showcasing the transportation sector (Railways, Roads and Highways, Metro, Aviation, Aerospace, Ports, Shipping, Maritime, Waterways, etc.)
- The "Banyan Tree" or "Vad Vriksha" from Vadodara, symbolizing both knowledge and sustainability.
- A continuous "wheel" of progress, depicting momentum and innovation.
- The Sanskrit śloka "अदम्यम् उत्कृष्टतायाः अनुसरणम्", translating to “Relentless Pursuit of Excellence”

== Faculty and Students ==
GSV offers undergraduate, postgraduate and doctoral programmes related to transportation and logistics. Its academic portfolio includes B.Tech programmes in Civil, Electronics and Communication, Mechanical and Electrical Engineering with specialisations in Rail Engineering, as well as B.Tech in Artificial Intelligence and Data Science with a specialisation in Transportation and Logistics. The university also offers B.Tech programmes in Aviation Engineering and Maritime Engineering, MBA programmes in Logistics and Supply Chain Management and Ports and Shipping Logistics, and doctoral programmes in Engineering and Management.

For working professionals, programmes include M.Tech in Intelligent Transport Systems, Railway Engineering, Bridge and Tunnel Engineering and Roads and Highway Engineering. MBA programmes include Logistics and Supply Chain Management, Metro Rail Management, Multimodal Transportation, Aviation Operations and Management, Infrastructure Asset Management, Digital Maritime and Railway Technology and Operations.

As of September 2026, Gati Shakti Vishwavidyalaya reported an enrolment of 1,335 students from 23 states. The university listed 45 faculty members, along with five distinguished visiting professors and approximately 75 visiting faculty members.

== Collaborations, Academic Programmes and Executive Trainings ==
- Academic Programmes and Collaborations
- Gati Shakti Vishwavidyalaya has collaborations with organisations working in the transportation, logistics, aviation, maritime, railway, semiconductor and related sectors.
- According to university information, its collaborations include industry, government organisations and academic institutions. Industry partners listed by the university include Airbus, Safran, Siemens, Tata Electronics, L&T Railway Business, SAP, Nokia, Plasser, Jacobs, Delhi Metro Rail Corporation, Jindal Stainless, Nippon Koei, Amazon, RailTel, Konkan Railway, Tata Elxsi, Nippon Express, Frauscher Sensor Technology, GMR Air Cargo and Aerospace Engineering and Lam Research, among others.
- Government and institutional collaborations listed by the university include the Department for Promotion of Industry and Internal Trade (DPIIT), Karmayogi Bharat, Indian Army, Indian Air Force, Indian Navy, Border Security Force, Defence Research and Development Organisation (DRDO), Confederation of Indian Industry (CII), Dedicated Freight Corridor Corporation of India, Container Corporation of India, New South Wales Transport, Gujarat Infrastructure Development Board, Research Designs and Standards Organisation, CSIR–National Metallurgical Laboratory, Semiconductor Laboratory, National Capital Region Transport Corporation, Central Board of Customs and Excise, Directorate General of Civil Aviation, IRCON International, Indian Railway Catering and Tourism Corporation, V.O. Chidambaranar Port Authority and Indian Railway Finance Corporation.
- The university also lists academic collaborations with institutions including Indian Maritime University, Peter the Great St. Petersburg University of Communications, Russian University of Transport, Monash University, Japan Transport and Tourism Research Institute, Indian Institute of Management Mumbai, BITS Pilani, IIT Gandhinagar, IIT Jodhpur, NAMTECH, CIPET, IIT Kanpur, CSIR–National Aerospace Laboratories, CSIR–Structural Engineering Research Centre and Maharaja Sayajirao University of Baroda.
- As of 2026, university documents state that GSV has more than 75 active memoranda of understanding with organisations and institutions. Academic programmes GSV offers undergraduate, postgraduate and doctoral programmes related to transportation, engineering, logistics and management.
- For regular students, the programmes listed by the university include: - B.Tech in Civil Engineering with specialisation in Rail Engineering - B.Tech in Electronics and Communication Engineering with specialisation in Rail Engineering - B.Tech in Mechanical Engineering with specialisation in Rail Engineering - B.Tech in Electrical Engineering with specialisation in Rail Engineering - B.Tech in Artificial Intelligence and Data Science with specialisation in Transportation and Logistics - B.Tech in Aviation Engineering - B.Tech in Maritime Engineering.
- MBA in Logistics and Supply Chain Management - MBA in Ports and Shipping Logistics, jointly with Indian Maritime University - PhD programmes in Engineering and Management.
- For working professionals, programmes listed by the university include M.Tech in Intelligent Transport Systems, M.Tech in Railway Engineering, M.Tech in Bridge and Tunnel Engineering, M.Tech in Roads and Highway Engineering, MBA in Logistics and Supply Chain Management, MBA in Metro Rail Management, MBA in Multimodal Transportation, MBA in Aviation Operations and Management, MBA in Infrastructure Asset Management, MBA in Digital Maritime, MBA in Railway Technology and Operations, and PhD programmes in Engineering and Management.

GSV has a mandate to not only conduct academic programs (Bachelor’s, Masters, Doctoral level) but also towards executive training of officers.

Executive Training of officers: GSV has trained more than 1750 officers in physical mode during last 2 years. In addition, GSV has trained more than 2.6 Lakh Govt employees through PM Gati Shakti Course on iGOT Karmayogi Bharat. Some of the courses that are conducted regularly, for illustrative purposes are:

- Railways Officers

–Probationers Course for Indian Railways Management Service (33 Weeks out of 104 weeks happen in GSV)

–Advanced Management Program – AMP (2 Weeks)

–Management Development Program – MDP (3 Weeks)

–Strategic Management Program (1 Week)

- Officers of Defence Forces (Indian Army, Indian Air Force, Indian Navy)

–Supply Chain Science

–PM Gati Shakti Master Plan

–Artificial Intelligence (AI)

–Marine Logistics

–Management Development Program – MDP

- Civil Services Officers

–Short term courses on PM Gati Shakti

–15-hour course material already developed and recorded

–Partnership with Capacity Building Commission for training of CPSE Officers in Infrastructure Project and Asset Management

- International Training Programs

(Sponsored by Ministry of External Affairs under ITEC initiatives)

–ITEC – Urban Mobility (1 Week)

–ITEC – Leadership in Logistics and SCM (1 Week)

–ITEC – Multimodal Logistics (1 Week)

–ITEC – PPP and Infrastructure Planning (1 Week)

–ITEC – Training Program for Nepalese Railway Personnel (2 weeks)

–AITD – international training programs (Asian Institute of Transport Development

- Customized Training Programs

–Railway PSUs, Government organizations, Private sector organizations

== Timeline ==
- Aug 2022: Established as a Central University by the act of Parliament.
