= Indira Gandhi National Tribal University =

Central university in Amarkantak, Madhya Pradesh, India

- इंदिरा गांधी राष्ट्रीय जनजातीय विश्वविद्यालय
- Motto: विद्यया विन्दते ऽखिलम्
- Type: Central Tribal university
- Established: 20 December 2007; 18 years ago
- Accreditation: NAAC
- Academic affiliations: UGC
- Endowment: 63.2 crore
- Budget: 78 crore
- Chancellor: Dr. Mukul Shah
- Vice-Chancellor: Byomakesh Tripathy (I/C)
- Visitor: President of India
- Academic staff: 177
- Location: Amarkantak; Tahamzam, India; 22.806°N 81.750°E
- Campus: 673 acres (272 ha); rural
- Language: English, Hindi
- Website: https://www.igntu.ac.in/

Indira Gandhi National Tribal University (IGNTU), is a Central University located in Madhya Pradesh, India established in 2007 and named after former Indian prime minister Indira Gandhi.The university started its operations in 2008 from a temporary campus in Amarkantak and later shifted to its own campus in Lalpur, 23 kilometers away. The university was established to promote education in the backward tribal regions of India. IGNTU opened a regional campus in Manipur in 2009. A regional campus of the university was sanctioned in 2010 to be in Kalahandi district but it did not materialize. Later in 2023 a Team consisting of Ministry of Tribal Affairs and IGNTU officials conducted a survey in Mayurbhanj district for setting up of the university's third campus. The university was ranked 9th best in India by IIRF in 2025.

== History ==
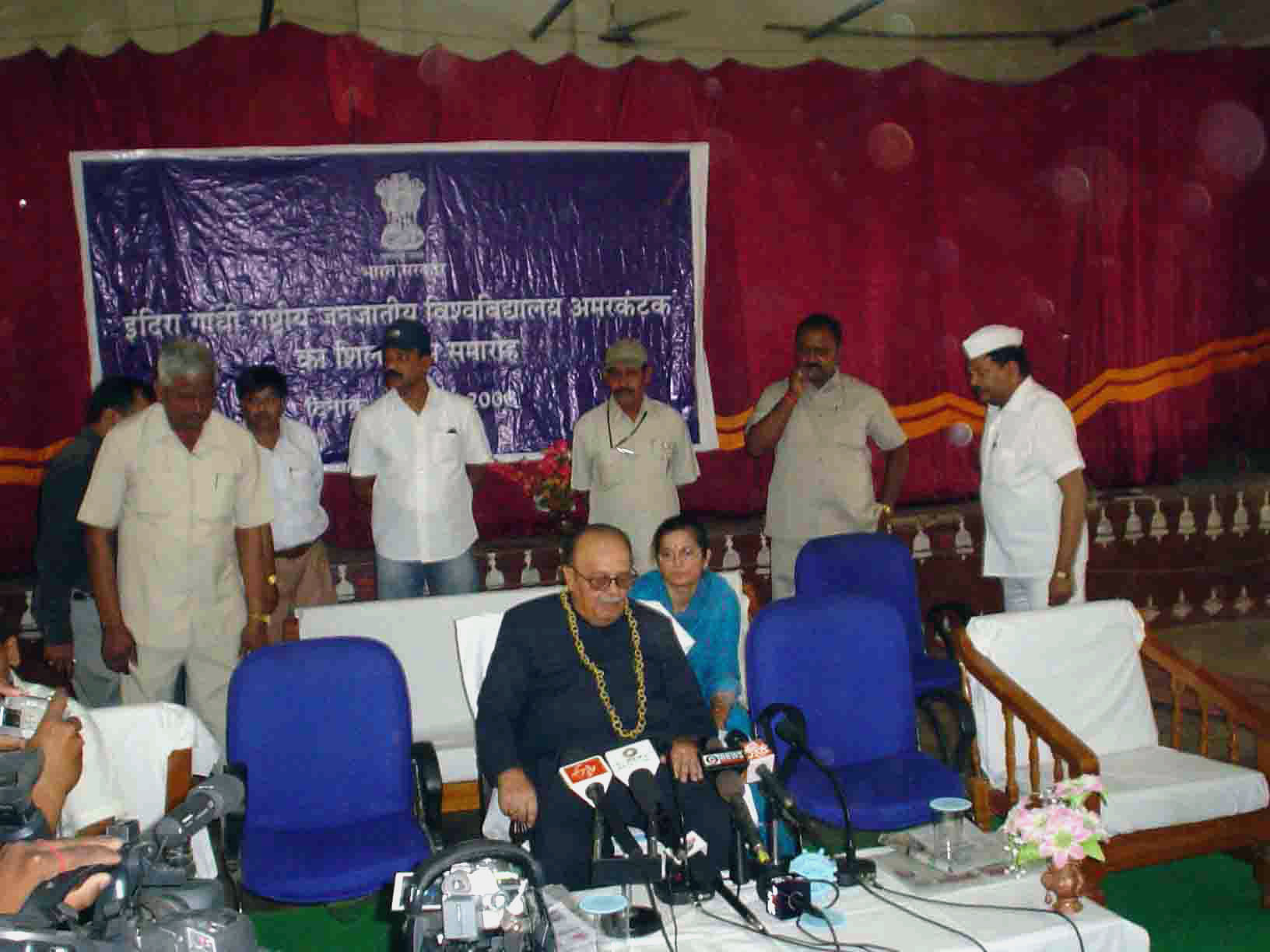
The Union Minister for Human Resource Development, Shri Arjun Singh at the foundation laying ceremony of the Indira Gandhi National Tribal University at Amarkantak, in Anupur District, Madhya Pradesh on April 19, 2008

Former union minister Arjun Singh tabled a bill in the parliament for setting up a tribal university after scrutiny by other MP's an Act was passed in Indian parliament which was published in the Gazette of India, Part II, section I, on 20 December 2007 by the virtue of which Indira Gandhi National Tribal University Act, 52, 2007. The then M.H.R.D. minister, Arjun Singh laid the foundation stone on 19 April 2008 at Amarkantak. The government of India on 7 July 2008, circulated the order of appointment of the founder vice-chancellor of the university. In compliance of this order, Prof. Chandra Deo Singh took the post on 08.07.2008. To provide higher education in other tribal regions of India Regional campus in Manipur(2009) and Kalahandi(2010) were finalized and sanctioned, but only the regional center at Manipur came into existence and an alternative to Kalahandi is currently being searched.

== Departments of the university ==
Departments of Main Campus :

1. Department of Ancient Indian History, Culture & Archaeology
2. Department of Psychology
3. Department of Biotechnology
4. Department of Botany
5. Department of Business Management
6. Department of Chemistry
7. Department of Commerce
8. Department of Computer Science
9. Department of Economics
10. Department of Education
11. Department of English and Foreign Languages
12. Department of Environment Science
13. Department of Geography and Regional Development
14. Department of Geology
15. Department of Hindi
16. Department of History
17. Department of Journalism and Mass Communication
18. Department of Linguistics and Contrastive Study of Tribal Languages
19. Department of Mathematics
20. Department of Museology
21. Department of Pharmacy
22. Department of Philosophy
23. Department of Physics
24. Department of Political Science and Human Rights
25. Department of Physical Education
26. Department of Sanskrit
27. Department of Social Work
28. Department of Sociology and Social Anthropology
29. Department of Statistics
30. Department of Tourism Management
31. Department of Tribal Studies, Art, Culture & Folk Literature
32. Department of Vocational Education
33. Department of Yoga
34. Department of Zoology
35. Department of Music
36. Department of Home Science
37. Department of Nursing

Departments of Regional Campus (Manipur) :

1. Department of Political Science
2. Department of Sociology
3. Department of Social Work
4. Department of Tribal Studies

== Regional Campus ==
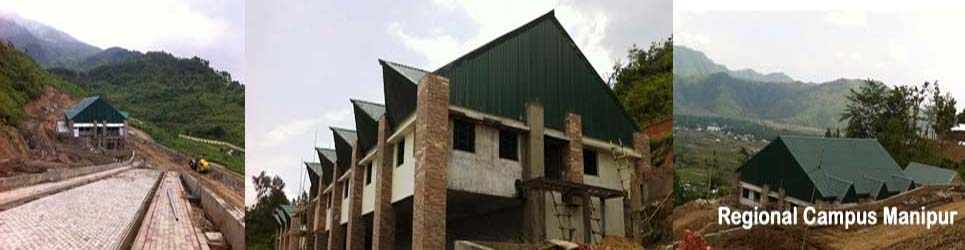
IGNTU regional campus, Manipur

The Indira Gandhi National Tribal University, Regional Campus Manipur (IGNTU-RCM) was established in 2009 as a Regional Centre of IGNTU, Amarkantak. The regional campus started functioning from Adimjati Shiksha Ashram, Imphal. The university now operates from its permanent campus in Makhan, Manipur. Government of Manipur allocated 301 acres of land to the university where the construction is ongoing. The campus offers Masters in four disciplines and provides PhD in Political Science and Social Work.

== Non academic activities (Main Campus) ==
- Library (Prof. Ram Dayal Munda Central Library) : The University Library, Indira Gandhi National Tribal University is a Centre of information for the academic community of the university and is expected to be developed into a hub of knowledge to all the academic community and a gateway to national and global knowledge. It ensures fair access to knowledge to the academics on the campus in particular and to each individual related to the university in general. The Library started functioning in July 2009. Within a short period it could attain a considerable level of development and is moving fast towards a fully automated library. Library is using KOHA Software for automation.
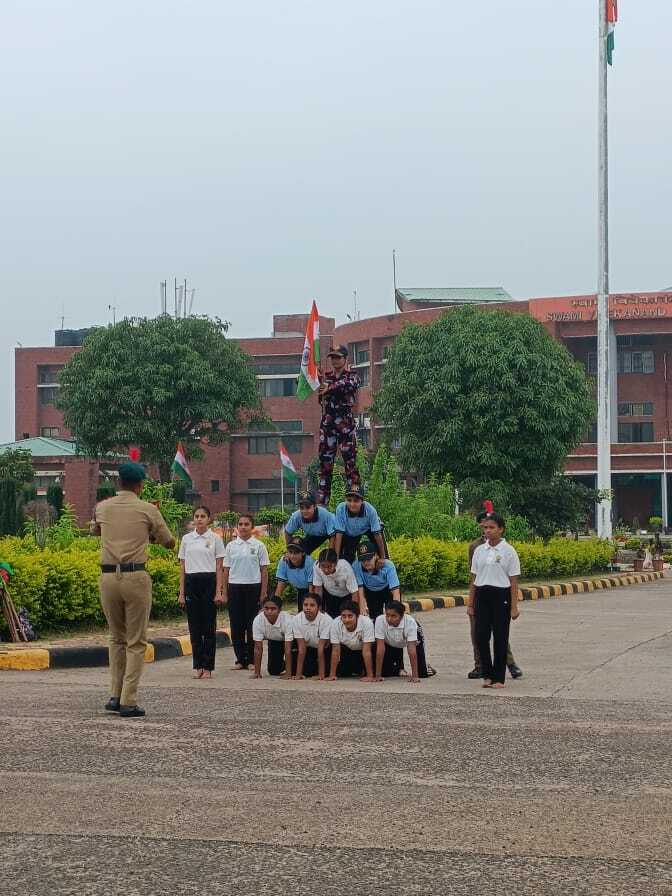
- NCC IGNTU cadets practicing for Independence day
  NCC unit (IGNTU) : NCC unit of the university is under the 7 M.P. (I) COY NCC Shahdol of Jabalpur Group. It was started in the university since July 2013. The total allotment strength of SD (Senior Division NCC) Cadets is 106. Presently the total strength of SD Cadets is 36. It currently have the corps company for SD NCC Boys only.
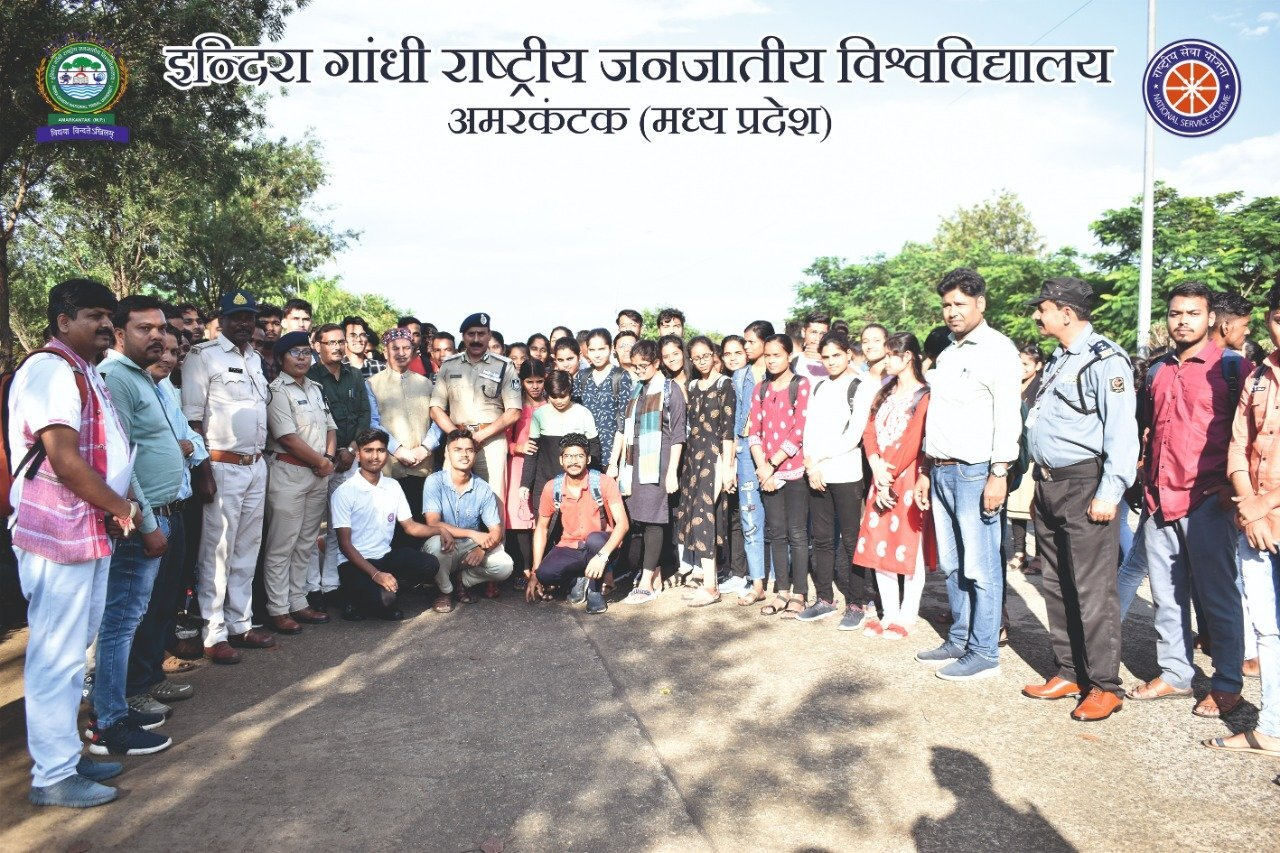
- NSS IGNTU Volunteers with Madhya Pradesh Police During the Anti-Drugs Campaign.
  NSS unit (IGNTU) : NSS unit of the university was established in 2013 under the National Service Scheme of the Government Of India. It was established to promote community coordination among the students of the university. It has Organized several campaigns with government agencies.

== See also ==
- Central University (India)
