= National Eligibility cum Entrance Test =

National Eligibility cum Entrance Test may refer to:

- National Eligibility cum Entrance Test (Undergraduate), an entrance examination in India for students who wish to study undergraduate medical and dental courses
- National Eligibility cum Entrance Test (Postgraduate), an entrance examination in India for students who wish to study postgraduate medical courses
