= Central University of Punjab =

Central university in Bathinda, Punjab, India

- Other names: CU Punjab & CUPB
- Type: Central
- Established: 2009; 17 years ago
- Accreditation: NAAC Accredited with 'A+' Grade (Second Cycle Accreditation 2023)
- Academic affiliations: UGC, ACU, AICTE, PCI, BCI, ICMR, ICSSR, CSIR
- Chancellor: Dr. Jagbir Singh
- Vice-Chancellor: Dr. Ramakrishna Wusirika (acting)
- Visitor: President of India
- Location: Bathinda, Punjab, India; 30°08′24″N 74°47′27″E
- Campus: 500 acres (200 ha); Rural
- Website: www.cup.edu.in

Central University of Punjab is a central research university located in Ghudda village of Bathinda, Punjab, India.

== Founding ==
The Central University of Punjab was established through the Central Universities Act 2009 which received the assent of the President of India on 20 March 2009. Its territorial jurisdiction extends to the whole State of Punjab. It started its functioning from Camp Office in April 2009, and since November 2009 it shifted to its City Campus spread over an area of 35 acres.

== Degrees ==
The university offers mainly research oriented master's and doctoral degree programmes: Ph.D., M.Sc., M.A., M.Lib.I.Sc., M.Pharm., M.Tech., LL.M., M.Ed. and MBA. The university has started offering following bachelor's degrees also since July 2024: B.Tech(CSE), B.A.-LL.B., B.Pharmacy, B.A.-B.Ed. and B.Sc.-B.Ed. Launched four new UG Integrated courses of Biological Sciences in streams like - Biochemistry, Botany, Microbiology and Zoology [BS-MS Integrated].

== Schools ==
- School of Basic Sciences
- School of Education
- School of Engineering & Technology
- School of Environment and Earth Sciences
- School of Health Sciences
- School of Information and Communication Studies
- School of International Studies
- School of Languages, Literature and Culture
- School of Legal Studies
- School of Management
- School of Social Sciences

== Accreditation and ranking ==
University rankings

General – India
- NIRF (Universities) (2024): 83

Pharmacy – India
- NIRF (2024): 23

The university has a NAAC 'A+' Grade.The university ranked 77th among universities, 40th in Law category, and 20th in the pharmacy category in the NIRF ranking of 2025.

Central University of Punjab has been ranked as number one amongst newly established central universities in India consistently since 2012 as per university rankings of Researchgate and Scopus.

== See also ==
- List of universities in India
- University Grants Commission (India)
