= Indian Institute of Management (disambiguation) =

Indian Institute of Management may refer to:

- Indian Institutes of Management
  - Indian Institute of Management Calcutta located in Kolkata, West Bengal, India
  - Indian Institute of Management Ahmedabad located in Ahmedabad, Gujarat, India
  - Indian Institute of Management Bangalore located in Bangalore, Karnataka, India
  - Indian Institute of Management Lucknow located in Lucknow, Uttar Pradesh, India
  - Indian Institute of Management Kozhikode located in Kozhikode, Kerala, India
  - Indian Institute of Management Indore located in Indore, Madhya Pradesh, India
  - Indian Institute of Management Shillong located in Shillong, Meghalaya, India
  - Indian Institute of Management Rohtak located in Rohtak, Haryana, India
  - Indian Institute of Management Ranchi located in Ranchi, Jharkhand, India
  - Indian Institute of Management Raipur located in Raipur, Chhattisgarh, India
  - Indian Institute of Management Tiruchirappalli located in Tiruchirappalli, Tamil Nadu, India
  - Indian Institute of Management Udaipur located in Udaipur, India
  - Indian Institute of Management Kashipur located in Kashipur, India
  - Indian Institute of Management Nagpur located in Nagpur, India
  - Indian Institute of Management Guwahati located in Guwahati, Assam, India.
