= Indian Institute of Management Nagpur =

Public business school in Nagpur, India

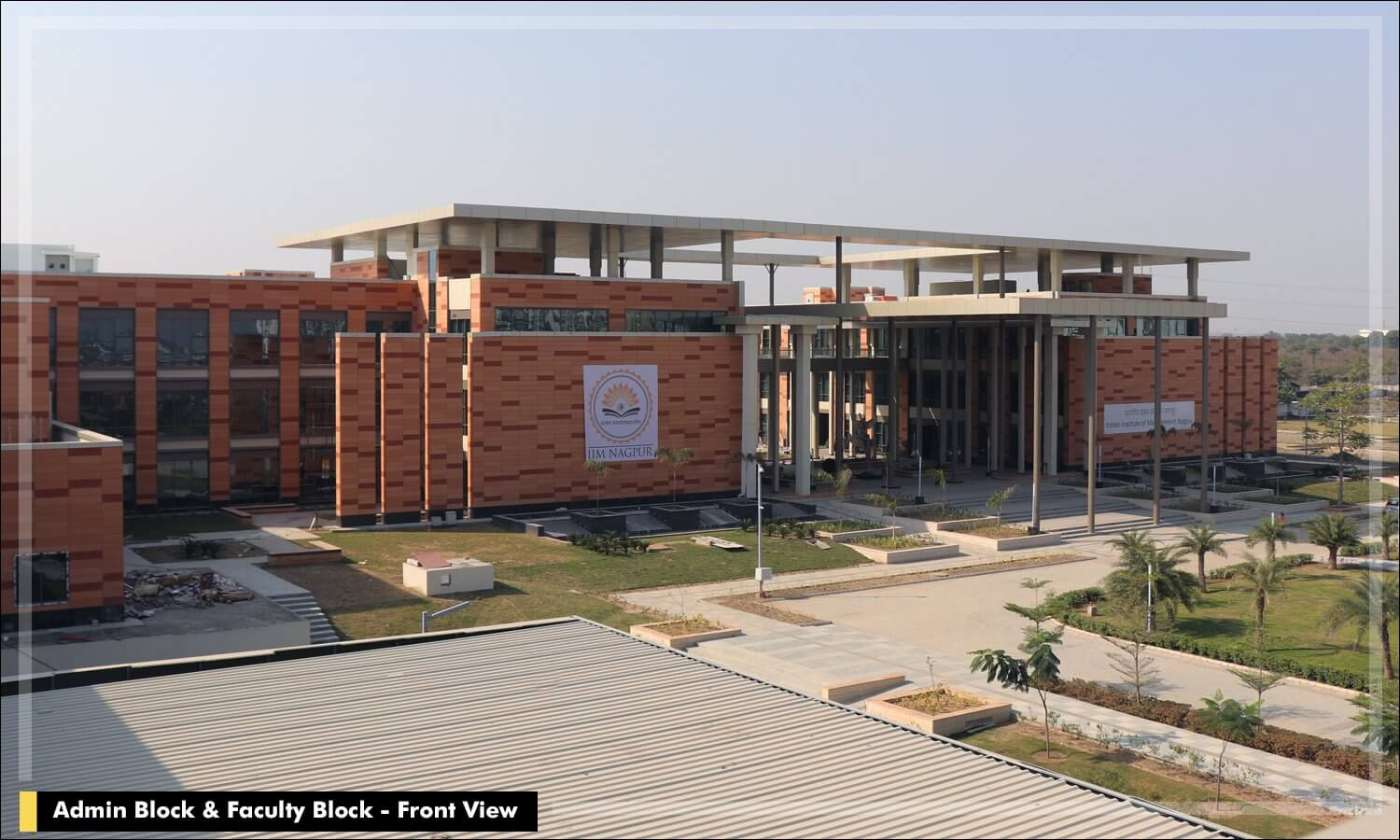
- Motto: सत्यं च स्वाध्याय प्रवचने च
- Motto in English: Towards truth through individual reflection and collective discourse
- Type: Public business school
- Established: 2015; 11 years ago
- Parent institution: Government of India
- Affiliations: Indian Institutes of Management
- Chairperson: C. P. Gurnani
- Director: Bhimaraya Metri
- Location: Plot No. 1, Sector 20, MIHAN (Non-SEZ), Nagpur, Maharashtra 441108; 21.0395°N 79.0321°E
- Campus: Suburban, 132 acres (53 ha)
- Website: www.iimnagpur.ac.in

The Indian Institute of Management Nagpur (also known as IIM Nagpur or IIMN) is a public business school located in Nagpur, Maharashtra, India. Established in 2015 under the mentorship of IIM Ahmedabad, it was the first among the six new-generation Indian Institutes of Management established by the Government of India in 2015 to begin academic operations. The institute is an Institute of National Importance under the Indian Institutes of Management Act, 2017. It is a member of the Association to Advance Collegiate Schools of Business (AACSB).

IIM Nagpur operates from a 132-acre permanent campus in the Multi-modal International Cargo Hub and Airport at Nagpur (MIHAN), inaugurated on 8 May 2022 by Ram Nath Kovind, then President of India. The institute is ranked 25th among management schools in India by the National Institutional Ranking Framework (NIRF) in 2025.

== History ==
=== Establishment ===
IIM Nagpur was established in 2015 as one of six new Indian Institutes of Management sanctioned by the Government of India. It was designated to operate under the mentorship of IIM Ahmedabad, the oldest IIM. The first batch of the Post Graduate Programme (PGP) in Management commenced on 23 July 2015 at a temporary campus within the premises of Visvesvaraya National Institute of Technology Nagpur (VNIT), with an initial intake of 55 students admitted through the Common Admission Test (CAT). IIM Nagpur was the first among the 2015 batch of new IIMs to become operational. The institute was inaugurated by Maharashtra Chief Minister Devendra Fadnavis.

=== Permanent Campus ===
The groundbreaking ceremony for IIM Nagpur's permanent campus was held on 6 March 2019, attended by Union Minister Nitin Gadkari and Chief Minister Devendra Fadnavis. The Central Government sanctioned ₹379.68 crores in 2018 for campus construction. Phase 1 of the campus was built to accommodate 600 students.

The institute relocated to its permanent 132-acre campus at MIHAN in November 2021. The campus was formally inaugurated on 8 May 2022 by Ram Nath Kovind, the President of India.

=== Statutory Framework ===
IIM Nagpur is governed by the Indian Institutes of Management Act, 2017, which confers upon it the status of an Institute of National Importance and grants autonomy in academic, administrative, financial, and operational matters.

== Campus ==
=== Main Campus ===
The main campus of IIM Nagpur is located in Sector 20, MIHAN (Non-SEZ), Nagpur, Maharashtra. Spread across 132 acres (53 ha), it is situated within the Multi-modal International Cargo Hub and Airport at Nagpur economic zone, adjacent to Dr. Babasaheb Ambedkar International Airport, Nagpur. The campus includes academic blocks, student hostels, faculty residences, a library, and sports facilities.

=== Satellite Campus ===
IIM Nagpur operates a satellite campus in Pune, Maharashtra, for its Executive MBA programme.

== Academic Programmes ==
IIM Nagpur offers postgraduate, executive, and doctoral programmes in management.

=== MBA (Post Graduate Programme in Management) ===
The two-year full-time residential Post Graduate Programme (PGP) in Management leads to an MBA degree. Admission is through Common Admission Test (CAT) scores followed by the Common Admission Process (CAP), comprising a Written Ability Test (WAT) and personal interview. The curriculum follows a trimester structure and includes a summer internship after the first year.

=== Executive MBA ===
The two-year Executive MBA (EMBA) programme is for mid-to-senior level executives with a minimum of three years of work experience. It is offered from the Pune satellite campus.

=== Executive MBA in Energy Management ===
IIM Nagpur offers a two-year Executive MBA in Energy Management (MBA-EM) in collaboration with the National Power Training Institute (NPTI), a Government of India undertaking under the Ministry of Power. The programme is designed for working professionals in the energy and power sectors and includes four campus immersion modules. It awards an MBA degree from IIM Nagpur and a certificate from NPTI. The inaugural cohort of 43 students, representing 16 states, commenced in November 2025.

=== Blended MBA for Working Professionals ===
IIM Nagpur offers a two-year Blended MBA (BMBA) for working professionals, combining online sessions with mandatory campus immersions. Applicants require a minimum of three years of full-time work experience.

=== PhD (Full-Time) ===
The full-time PhD in Management is a four-year funded doctoral programme. Specialisation areas include Finance and Accounting, Marketing, Strategy and Entrepreneurship, Decision Science and Information Systems, Production and Operations Management, Organisational Behaviour and Human Resources Management, Economics, and Humanities, Arts and Social Sciences.

=== PhD (Executive) ===
The PhD (Executive) programme is for working professionals with a minimum of ten years of experience, to be completed within four to six years.

=== Executive Education ===
IIM Nagpur offers short-duration Management Development Programmes (MDPs) for corporate, government, and public sector organisations. The institute has delivered programmes for the Directorate General Resettlement (DGR), Ministry of Defence, for retiring Armed Forces Officers.

== Research and Centres ==
IIM Nagpur has established several Centres of Excellence (CoEs) and Section 8 companies for research, entrepreneurship, and applied management.

=== InFED - IIMN Foundation for Entrepreneurship Development ===
InFED (IIMN Foundation for Entrepreneurship Development) is the business incubator of IIM Nagpur, registered as a Section 8 company. It supports entrepreneurs through incubation, research, and training programmes. Prof. Bhimaraya Metri, Director of IIM Nagpur, serves as Chairman of InFED.

InFED has incubated women entrepreneurs under the Women Startup Programme (WSP), conducted in collaboration with the N. S. Raghavan Centre for Entrepreneurial Learning (NSRCEL) at IIM Bangalore, with support from Goldman Sachs and the Department of Science & Technology, Government of India. InFED has also signed an MoU with the Indian Institute of Packaging, Mumbai. The Maharashtra Agribusiness Network Project (MAGNET), a project of the Government of Maharashtra assisted by the Asian Development Bank, has designated IIM Nagpur as a Centre of Excellence for farmer and agri-startup support in the Vidarbha and Marathwada regions.

=== CLIP - Council for Logistics, Infrastructure and Project Management ===
The Council for Logistics, Infrastructure and Project Management (CLIP) is a Section 8 company at IIM Nagpur, focused on training, research, and consultancy in logistics, infrastructure, and project management. It works with bodies such as the Project Management Institute (PMI), the International Project Management Association (IPMA), and ISO. Prof. Bhimaraya Metri serves as Chairman of CLIP.

=== CGCS - Centre of Excellence for Corporate Governance, CSR and Sustainability ===
The Centre of Excellence for Corporate Governance, CSR and Sustainability (CGCS) focuses on corporate governance, corporate social responsibility, and sustainability. It organises conferences, seminars, and management development programmes. Dr. Bhimaraya Metri is the Patron of CGCS; Dr. Suhas Buddhe (managing director, Biocare India) serves as co-chairman.

=== CCDA - Centre for Cybersecurity and Data Analytics ===
The Centre for Cybersecurity and Data Analytics (CCDA) was established at IIM Nagpur in 2021. The centre conducts research, training, and consulting in cybersecurity management and business analytics. It is chaired by Prof. Kapil Kaushik.

=== Case Research Centre ===
The Case Research Centre (CRC) was launched at IIM Nagpur on 17 November 2025, making IIM Nagpur the fourth IIM in India after IIM Ahmedabad, IIM Calcutta, and IIM Bangalore to establish a dedicated case research centre. The CRC develops and disseminates India-centric management case studies from Indian companies, start-ups, government projects, and social organisations. IIM Nagpur has partnered with Ivey Publishing for global collaboration and case distribution. Prof. Rakesh Gupta serves as Chairperson of the CRC.

=== CLED - Centre for Leadership Excellence and Development ===
The Centre for Leadership Excellence and Development (CLED) focuses on leadership research and development programmes. It is chaired by Prof. Neerpal Rathi, a faculty member in the Organisational Behaviour and Human Resource Management area. The centre has partnered with author and speaker Shiv Khera to conduct executive development programmes on leadership and related subjects.

=== IJRC - Indo-Japan Research Centre ===
The Indo-Japan Research Centre (IJRC) was founded at IIM Nagpur in 2020 to strengthen collaborative research between India and Japan and to support the institute's internationalisation. The centre was established alongside an MoU between IIM Nagpur and Chuo University's Graduate School of Strategic Management, Japan. The IJRC operates under the guidance of Prof. Rahul Kumar Sett. Its activities include academic guest lectures, cultural events, and engagement with the Embassy of Japan in India.

=== Conferences and Events ===
IIM Nagpur has hosted several international academic conferences. In December 2023, it hosted the International Federation for Information Processing (IFIP) Working Group 8.6 Conference on emerging technologies. In October 2023, it hosted the 11th Humanistic Management Conference in collaboration with the Humanistic Management Network, Switzerland. In December 2023, IIM Nagpur hosted the inaugural Zero Mile Samvad, a global thought leadership summit.

== Accreditation and Rankings ==
=== Accreditation ===
IIM Nagpur is a member of the Association to Advance Collegiate Schools of Business (AACSB).

=== Rankings ===
IIM Nagpur is ranked annually by the National Institutional Ranking Framework (NIRF), published by the Ministry of Education, Government of India.

IIM Nagpur — NIRF Management Rankings
Year	NIRF Rank (Management)
2025	25
2024	31
2023	43
2022	43
2021	40
2020	40

(Note: Source: National Institutional Ranking Framework, Ministry of Education, Government of India.)

IIM Nagpur is ranked 25th among management schools in India by the National Institutional Ranking Framework (NIRF) in 2025. It was ranked 31st in 2024.

Business Today–MDRA ranked IIM Nagpur 12th among government business schools in India and 9th among Indian Institutes of Management in its Best B-Schools Ranking 2025.

In executive education rankings published by Business Today–MDRA in 2025, IIM Nagpur's Senior Management Programme was ranked 7th nationally under the Advanced Management Programmes category, while its Post Graduate Certificate Programme in General Management was ranked 9th nationally under the Post Graduate Certificate Programmes category.

IIM Nagpur's Blended MBA for Working Professionals programme was ranked 8th nationally in the Business Today–MDRA 2025 rankings for blended MBA programmes.

== Governance ==
=== Board of Governors ===
IIM Nagpur is governed by a Board of Governors constituted under the Indian Institutes of Management Act, 2017. The current chairperson of the Board is C. P. Gurnani.

=== Directors ===
#	Name	Tenure	Notes
3	Bhimaraya Metri	2020–Present	Previously Director of IIM Tiruchirappalli (2017–2020); PhD from IIT Bombay.
2	L. S. Murty	2017– 2020	Professor of Operations Management; Fellow of IIM Ahmedabad; previously at IIM Bangalore (1991–2017).
1	Ashish Nanda	2015–2017	Officiating Director from inception; concurrently Director of IIM Ahmedabad (2013–2017); Professor at Harvard Business School.

== Student Life ==
=== Students' Affairs Executive Council ===
The Students' Affairs Executive Council (SAEC) is the elected representative body of the student community at IIM Nagpur. It comprises a President, General Secretary (Academic Clubs), General Secretary (Co-Curricular Clubs), Student Affairs Secretary, CDS Representative, and Student Diversity Representative.

=== Academic Clubs ===
IIM Nagpur has the following academic clubs:

- FINesse - Finance Club
- MarX - Marketing Club
- OPEX - Operations Club (est. 2015)
- Eques - Strategy and Consulting Club
- E-Cell - Entrepreneurship Cell
- Predixion - Analytics Club
- Athena - Economics and Public Policy Club (inaugurated 2 August 2021)
- PRODG - Product Management Club
- tHRive - Human Resources Club (est. 2019)

=== Non-Academic Clubs ===
Non-academic clubs include:

- Sports Club
- Swaviskaar - Arts Club (est. 2019)
- Veda - Literature Club
- Ummeed - Community Outreach Club
- Nexus - Media and PR Club
- Toastmasters - Public Speaking Chapter
- Abhyudaya - Cultural Club
- Cineastes - The Movie Club

=== Student Committees ===
IIM Nagpur has the following student committees:

- Alumni Committee - fosters relations between alumni and current students; runs ALTalks, a speaker series.
- Placement Committee - coordinates campus recruitment.
- Student Academic Body (SAB) - liaises with the PGP office on academic matters.
- Mess Committee - manages dining services.
- Infrastructure Committee - acts as an interface between students and administration on infrastructure matters.

=== International Immersion ===
As part of the MBA curriculum, students may participate in optional international immersion modules. Modules have been organised in Singapore, Dubai, Japan, France, and South Korea.

=== Collaboration with UNICEF ===
In July 2022, IIM Nagpur, in partnership with UNICEF and Holkar Solapur University, launched an initiative for the education of underprivileged children.

== International Collaborations ==
IIM Nagpur has established international academic partnerships. The institute hosted the International Federation for Information Processing (IFIP) Working Group 8.6 Conference in December 2023, and the 11th Humanistic Management Conference in collaboration with the Humanistic Management Network, Switzerland, in October 2023. MBA students have undertaken international immersion programmes in Singapore, Japan, France, the UAE, and South Korea.

== Sources ==
- "Maharashtra CM Devendra Fadnavis inaugurates IIM Nagpur". DNA India. 2015.
- Maitra, Pradip Kumar (8 May 2022). "President Kovind inaugurates new campus of IIM Nagpur". Hindustan Times.
- "Groundbreaking ceremony for IIM Nagpur campus held". Nagpur Today. 6 March 2019.
- "Maharashtra: UNICEF, IIM Nagpur, Holkar Solapur University launch initiative for underprivileged children". Free Press Journal. 2022.
- Ahmed, Sarfaraz (5 September 2019). "Going global: Dubai, Japan, S Korea, France beckon students of IIM-Nagpur". The Times of India.
- "Dr Bhimaraya Metri Appointed As Director Of IIM Nagpur". BW Education. 2020.
- "IIM Nagpur to train India's future energy leaders". Tripura Star News. 17 November 2025.
- "InFED conducts faculty development programme". The Hitavada. 23 March 2025.
- "Case Research Centre at IIM Nagpur aims to transform how India's business and public institutions learn". ANI. 17 November 2025.
- "Case Research Centre at IIM Nagpur". Press Information Bureau, Government of India. 17 November 2025.
- "About IIM Nagpur". iimnagpur.ac.in.
- "Member Profile – Indian Institute of Management Nagpur". AACSB. 2024.
- "Admissions Policy — Blended MBA for Working Professionals". IIM Nagpur. 2025.
- "NIRF India Rankings 2025 – Management". National Institutional Ranking Framework, Ministry of Education. 2025.
- "NIRF India Rankings 2024 – Management". National Institutional Ranking Framework, Ministry of Education. 2024.
- "BT-MDRA India's Best B-Schools Ranking 2025". Business Today–MDRA. November 2025.
- "Women incubatees getting productive, constructive mentoring at IIM Nagpur". Maharashtra Today. 29 September 2018. Archived from the original on 17 July 2020.
- "InFED, IIM Nagpur signs MoU with IIP, Mumbai to enable startups". Shiksha.com. 2021.
- "The Most Renowned Management Institute to Watch 2023". Fanzine India. 2023.
- "IIM Nagpur — IIRF Ranking". IIRF Ranking. 2025.
- "Bhimaraya Metri — IRINS Profile". IIM Nagpur IRINS.
- "Prof. Bhimaraya Metri — IMRC 2025 Speakers". India Management Research Conference, IIM Ahmedabad. 2025.
- "Dr. Bhimaraya Metri — Advisory Board". REVA University.
- "Dr. Bhimaraya Metri — Taxila Advisory Board". Taxila Business School.
- "AIMA Kewal Nohria Award". All India Management Association.
- "CGCS – IIM Nagpur". IIM Nagpur.
- "CCDA – IIM Nagpur". IIM Nagpur. 2021.
- "Centre for Leadership Excellence and Development". IIM Nagpur.
- "Indo-Japan Research Centre". IIM Nagpur. 2020.
- "Annual Report 2021–22" (PDF). IIM Nagpur. 2022.
- "IIM Nagpur and Shiv Khera Collaborates for Leadership Programs". CollegeDunia. 2023.
- "IIM Nagpur Collaborates with Chuo University Japan". CollegeDunia. 2020.
- "Dr. Bhimaraya Metri Joins as New Director of IIM Nagpur". IIM Nagpur. 6 October 2020.
- "Bhimaraya Metri becomes new director of IIM Nagpur". Careers360. 7 October 2020.
- "Prof. L S Murty retires from IIM Bangalore after three decades of outstanding service". The IIMB Digest. August 2021.
- "Ashish Nanda — Academic Advisory Board". Plaksha University.
- "The Indian Institutes of Management Act, 2017" (PDF). Ministry of Law and Justice, Government of India. 2017.
