= Combined Aptitude Test =

College admission exam in Maharashtra, India

Combined Aptitude Test (CAT) is an exam for admission into the courses MBBS, BDS, BE, B.Arch, MCA, MBA in colleges in Maharashtra, India. This exam should not be confused with Common Admission Test conducted by IIMs.

It was added to the selection procedure by the Union Public Service Commission (UPSC) in civil services preliminary exams.
