= LUMBA =

LUMBA is the popular acronym for MBA programme of Department of Business Administration, University of Lucknow. The department is one of the oldest institutions in field of Business Administration in India. Established in 1956 the course was run as Master of Commerce in Business Administration under the aegis of Department of Business Administration, Faculty of Commerce, University of Lucknow. Later on in 1976 it was named Masters in Business Administration. The admission for the post graduate programme is done through Common Admission Test (CAT). The department also has the Doctoral Program which takes admission through written entrance examination and preferably University Grants CommissionJunior Research Fellowship qualified candidates.

== History ==
LUMBA presented a workshop on Responsible Management Education in association with Principles for Responsible Management Education (PRME) Secretariat, United Nations Global Compact Office. Jonas Haertle, head of the (PRME) Secretariat was the key speaker.
