= Ferns N Petals =

Indian multinational floral and gifting company

- Type: Private company
- Industry: E-Commerce
- Founded: 1994
- Founder: Vikaas Gutgutia
- Headquarters: New Delhi, India
- Area served: Worldwide
- Key people: Vikaas Gutgutia(Founder); Pawan Gadia (CEO)

Ferns N Petals is an Indian online retailer of personalized floral, gifting, and gourmet company founded by Vikaas Gutgutia in 1994. The company is headquartered in Delhi, India, and operates in India, UAE, Singapore, Qatar, Saudi Arabia, Malaysi, and Nepal.

== History ==
Ferns N Petals was founded in 1994 in New Delhi by Vikaas Gutgutia. The company started as a flower shop in the South Extension area of New Delhi. The first store was opened in a 200-square-foot space with four employees and was established with an investment of ₹2.5 lakh from a friend. Ferns N Petals launched its website in 2002. The company later expanded to 252 stores across 93 Indian cities and Kathmandu, Nepal. The company also operates in UAE, Singapore, Qatar, Saudi Arabia, and Malaysia. As per Business Today Ferns N Petals has 400 stores across 133 cities in India.

In March 2022, Ferns N Petals raised $27 million (₹200 crore approx) in funding from Lighthouse India Fund.
