= Indian Institute of Management Bangalore =

Business school in Bengaluru, India

- Bhāratīya Prabaṃdha Saṃsthāna Bangalore (Hindi - IAST)
- IIMB Logo
- Other name: IIMB or IIM Bangalore
- Motto: Tejasvi nāvadhītamastu (Sanskrit - IAST/ISO 15919) t̪eːɟəsvi nɑːvəd̪ʰiːt̪əməst̪u (IPA)
- Motto in English: Let our study be enlightening
- Type: Business school (INI)
- Established: 1973; 53 years ago
- Accreditation: EQUIS
- Affiliations: UGC
- Endowment: ₹80.8 crore (US$8.6 million) (2023)
- Budget: ₹217.5 crore (US$23 million) (2023)
- Chairperson: Dr. Devi Prasad Shetty
- Director: U. Dinesh Kumar (I/C)
- Academic staff: 109
- Location: Bannerghatta Road, Bengaluru, Karnataka, 560076, India; 12°53′43″N 77°36′5″E
- Campus: Main: 105 acres (42 ha) Second: 110 acres (45 ha)
- Language: English
- Colours: Red
- Website: www.iimb.ac.in

The Indian Institute of Management Bangalore (IIM Bangalore or IIMB) is a public business school in Bengaluru, Karnataka, India. Established in 1973, it is the third of the Indian Institutes of Management and was declared an Institute of National Importance under the Indian Institutes of Management Act, 2017.

The institute was established by the Government of India and inaugurated by Prime Minister Indira Gandhi on 28 October 1973. It initially operated from rented premises before moving to its campus on Bannerghatta Road. It offers a two-year Master of Business Administration along with executive and doctoral programmes. Admission to the flagship MBA is through the Common Admission Test.

IIMB was established by the Government of India as an institute of excellence for education, training, research, and consulting in the field of management, and allied areas of knowledge. Located in India's high technology capital, IIMB's entrepreneurship centre NSRCEL is the leading business incubator among startup hubs at any STEM college or B-School in India, including all IITs and IIMs.

IIMB offers master's, and doctoral programmes in business administration, management, business analytics, and public policy. It also offers executive education programmes, and bachelor's in economics, data science, and digital business. The two-year MBA in general management is the flagship programme of the institute.

== History ==
=== Founding ===
In 1972, a committee headed by Ravi J. Matthai, first director of IIM Ahmedabad, noting the rising demand for graduates of the first two IIMs (namely, IIMC and IIMA), recommended the need to have two more IIMs. The new IIM was to be set up at Bangalore, and for the proposed institute, the Government of Karnataka offered 105 acres (42 ha) of land (free of cost), and a contribution of INR 3 million (~US$ 390,000 in 1972). Ultimately, on 27 March 1972, the IIMB Society was officially registered in Bangalore under the Mysore Societies' Registration Act.

The prominent Indian banker T.A. Pai, the Ex-Chairman of Syndicate Bank and Life Insurance Corporation, accepted to be the first Chairperson of the IIMB Board of Governors, and N.S. Iyer Ramaswamy, the then director of NITIE Mumbai, was appointed as the first Director of the institute. The institute was inaugurated by Indira Gandhi, the then Prime Minister of India, on 28 October 1973 at the Ravindra Kalakshetra in Bangalore. And, though it was not a legally-binding mandate from the Indian government, the first director tried to mold IIMB to cater to the needs of govt-owned entities like PSUs/PSEs, utility corporations, etc. due to his own left-leaning persuasions.

=== Initial years ===
The institute started operations in the campus of St. Joseph's College of Commerce, and some other buildings rented on the Langford Road in the city. Hostel provisions were temporarily made in the H.C. Dasappa Memorial Buildings in Jayanagar. The institute's first activity was a three-day conference in 1973, on urban development and management, which invited officials from all municipal corporations in Karnataka. Thereafter, IIMB started conducting Management Development Programmes (MDPs) and Organisation Based Programmes (OBPs) for public (govt.) sectors like power, irrigation, health, etc.

The first PG management course (called PGP) started in 1974, and the first doctoral course (called FPM) started in 1976. The institute held its first convocation on 10 July 1976 with a total of 48 graduating students, and on the same day the board also announced the appointment of architects for designing the official campus. On 27 November 1978, the 'Guddalipooja' (groundbreaking) ceremony of the campus on Bannerghatta Road was performed. In 1979, the institute started separate sections for sector-wise PGP courses, and in 1980 the first fellowship diploma (FPM) was awarded. IIMB moved operations to its own campus in 1983.

=== Crisis and reforms ===
The government entities did not show interest in IIMB's initiatives, and even by the 1980s, the institute could only get marginal success. Moreover, the employee union had co-opted external political leadership unconcerned with the institute's vision leading to severe dysfunction, and then resignation of the Director in mid-1983. Thereafter, for two years IIMB had no permanent Director, and further stagnated. The faculty was also split into 'sectoral' and 'business management' wings which had severe mutual disagreements. Thus, the institute encountered a period of serious crisis, administratively, and identity-wise.

Finally, Joe Philip was appointed by the board on 15 April 1985 with a clear mandate to bring back discipline. As Ex-VP (HR) at The Oberoi Group, he had experience in dealing with manpower issues. Under his charge, IIMB also started shifting away from its "state-corp" focus. He oversaw redesigning of PGP courses, increase in student intakes, and formalization of performance assessments. The sector-wise sections were also discontinued by 1986. The almost-dead FPM course was resuscitated by changing its focus from industry-sector to business-management. He was also instrumental in IIMB partnership with EFMD to initiate the faculty development programme in 1988-89. Importantly, in August 1990, he was able to wrest control of the Director's office from the union's illegal occupation after more than six years.

=== Growth ===
Dr. K.R.S. Murthy was appointed the Director on 11 February 1991 and remained till 28 February 1997. His tenure coincided with the economic liberalisation in India, and is mainly credited for driving the institute towards excellence. The PGP curriculum was further revised in 1991-92 to align it with global MBA programs. For manufacturing industries, a Management Program for Technologists (MPT) was started for mid-level engineers in 1992, along with a short-term program for senior executives in collaboration with MIT Sloan. IIMB became the first Indian B-School to have internet on campus (via ERNET) in December 1995, within four months of national internet launch.

In 1996, the management icon Dr. Henry Mintzberg selected IIM Bangalore over other Indian B-Schools as one of the five international founding-members of the IMPM Consortium. In 1998, the DoPT (GoI), in partnership with UNDP, selected IIMB to setup a Centre for Public Policy (CPP) which ultimately came up in July 2000. The institute got considerable endowment from an alumnus in 1999 to power-up the NSRCEL incubation centre.

The reforms and developments brought a successful turnaround, and wider recognition. In 2000, the Business Today magazine ranked IIMB the 1st in India in their BT-Cosmode Top 100 B-Schools survey (and, again in 2011). In 2003, The Wall Street Journal included IIMB among the top-100 B-Schools globally, in the unranked list of Next 50 B-Schools. India's key IT entity, NASSCOM, selected IIMB in 2005 for the Best India IT User Award in the education category. In 2011, IIMB became India's first (and Asia's fourth) B-School to sign a distribution agreement with Harvard Business Publishing for case studies.

In the 21st century, IIMB emphasised on tech business, data analytics, and entrepreneurship, thereby also creating a niche for itself. It also assisted and mentored two newly established IIMs (second and third generation) during their inception period - IIM Trichy in 2011, and IIM Visakhapatnam in 2015. It earned the reputation of being the most transparent B-School in India, and by 2023 it was the only IIM among top four which had complied with the legal requirements of independent review and public reporting (IIMC and IIMA did not). As of 2025, IIM Bangalore was the only Indian B-School in GNAM, an international collaboration convened by the Yale School of Management.

== Motto and logo ==
The official motto of the institute is the Sanskrit phrase तेजस्वि नावधीतमस्तु, and was adopted in the session 1991-92. It is pronounced as [t̪eːɟəsvi nɑːvəd̪ʰiːt̪əməst̪u] as per the IPA phonetic transcription; and is romanised (with diacritics) as tejasvi nāvadhītamastu as per the IAST, ALA-LC, UNRSGN, and ISO 15919 standards, or as tejasvi naavdhiitamastu as per the ASCII schemes of ITRANS and Velthuis both. It is a Sanskrit Shloka extracted from the Shanti Mantra invocated in the Taittiriya Upanishad, and the Katha Upanishad, two of the constituent texts of the Yajurveda. The motto translates to "Let our study be enlightening".

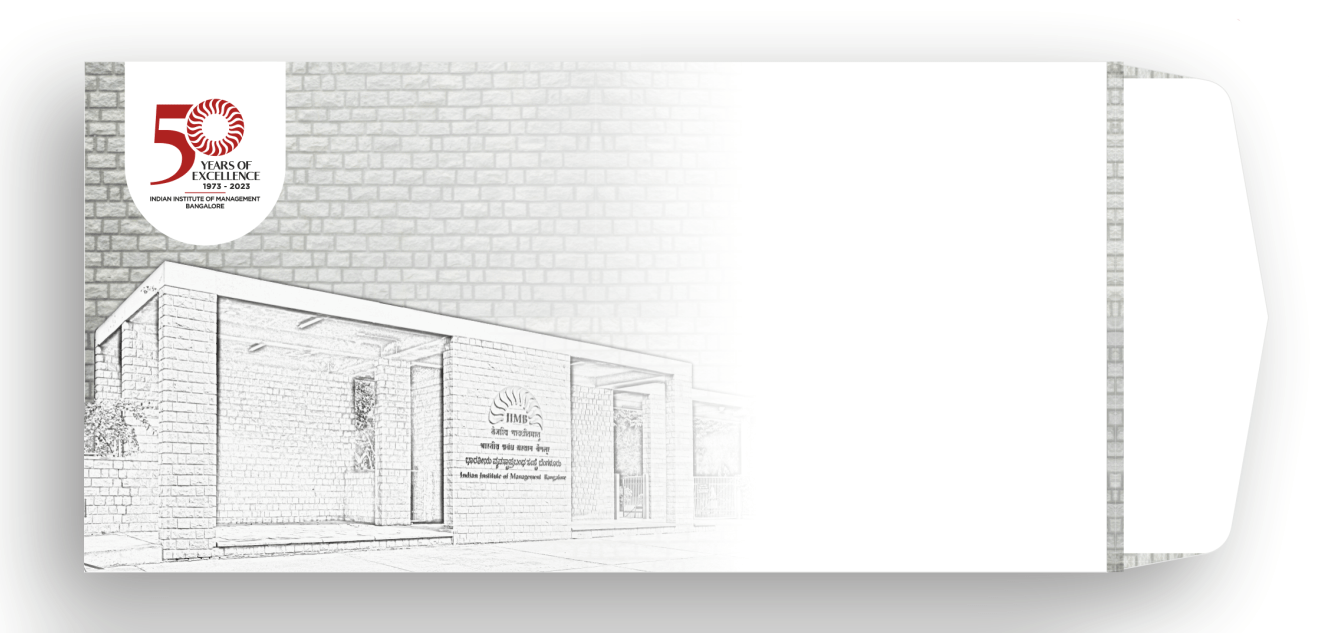
Commemorative Postal Cover with the Golden Jubilee Logo

The IIMB's official logo is a depiction of the top-half of a blazing sun with stylised rays prominently emanating from it. The image is in the style of a negative space picture with intense red colour in the background of rays (as half-disc), while the sun, rays, and other space in logo are in white colour (or empty). The text "IIMB" is written in black (in a sans-serif font) in the centre of the depicted sun, and the Sanskrit motto is written in black (in Devanagari script) below the sun. It was designed by the National Institute of Design, and was adopted in 1994. The hue of red colour in the logo is also used as the de facto official colour of IIMB.

A secondary celebratory logo was designed to commemorate the 50-year anniversary of IIMB. It was released on the 28 December 2022, before the beginning of Golden Jubilee celebrations scheduled in the academic session 2023-24. It was used for activities marking the semicentennial occasion, like the event cover released by the India Post, and the Golden Jubilee Week events from 26 to 29 October 2023.

== Campus ==
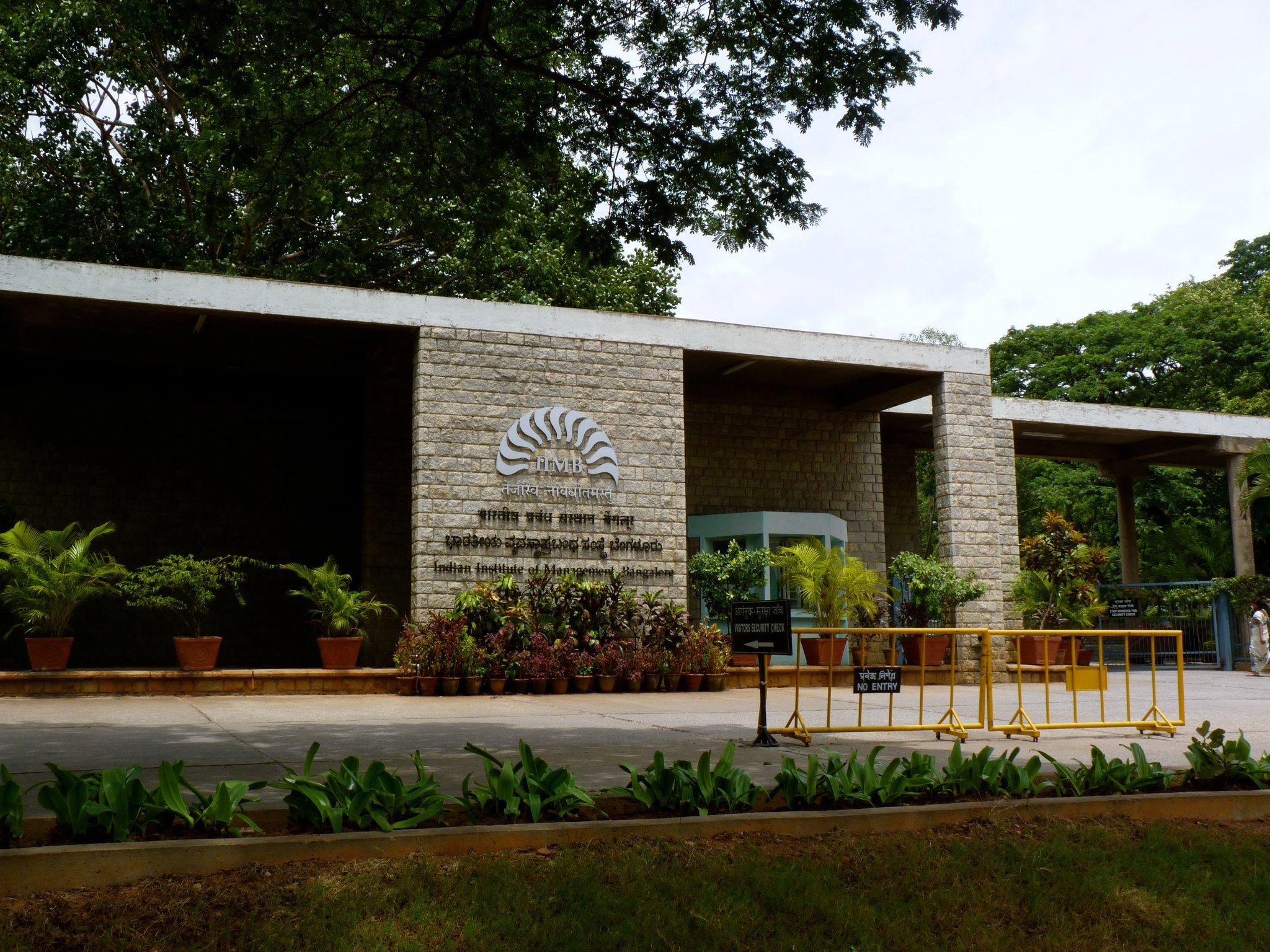
Main Entrance of IIMB campus

IIMB's main campus is located on the Bannerghatta Road in Bilekahalli suburb in the southern part of the metro-city of Bangalore. It occupies an area of around 105 acres, and has a non-urban feel with ample greenery. As of 2025, IIMB was setting up a 110-acre second campus 20 km away near Jigani, in the city's periphery, in Anekal Taluka of the Bangalore Urban district.

The campus is accessible by private or public transport from anywhere in the city via bike, car, taxi, or bus. A namesake 'IIMB' bus-stop is served adequately by the BMTC, and is 13 km from the integrated Kempegowda ("Majestic") Bus Station. The campus is 13 km from KSR City Junction, 13 km from Cantt. Railway Station, and 44 km from Kempegowda International Airport. A metro station named 'IIMB' on Pink Line (Namma Metro) is planned to be launched in March 2026.

=== Architecture ===
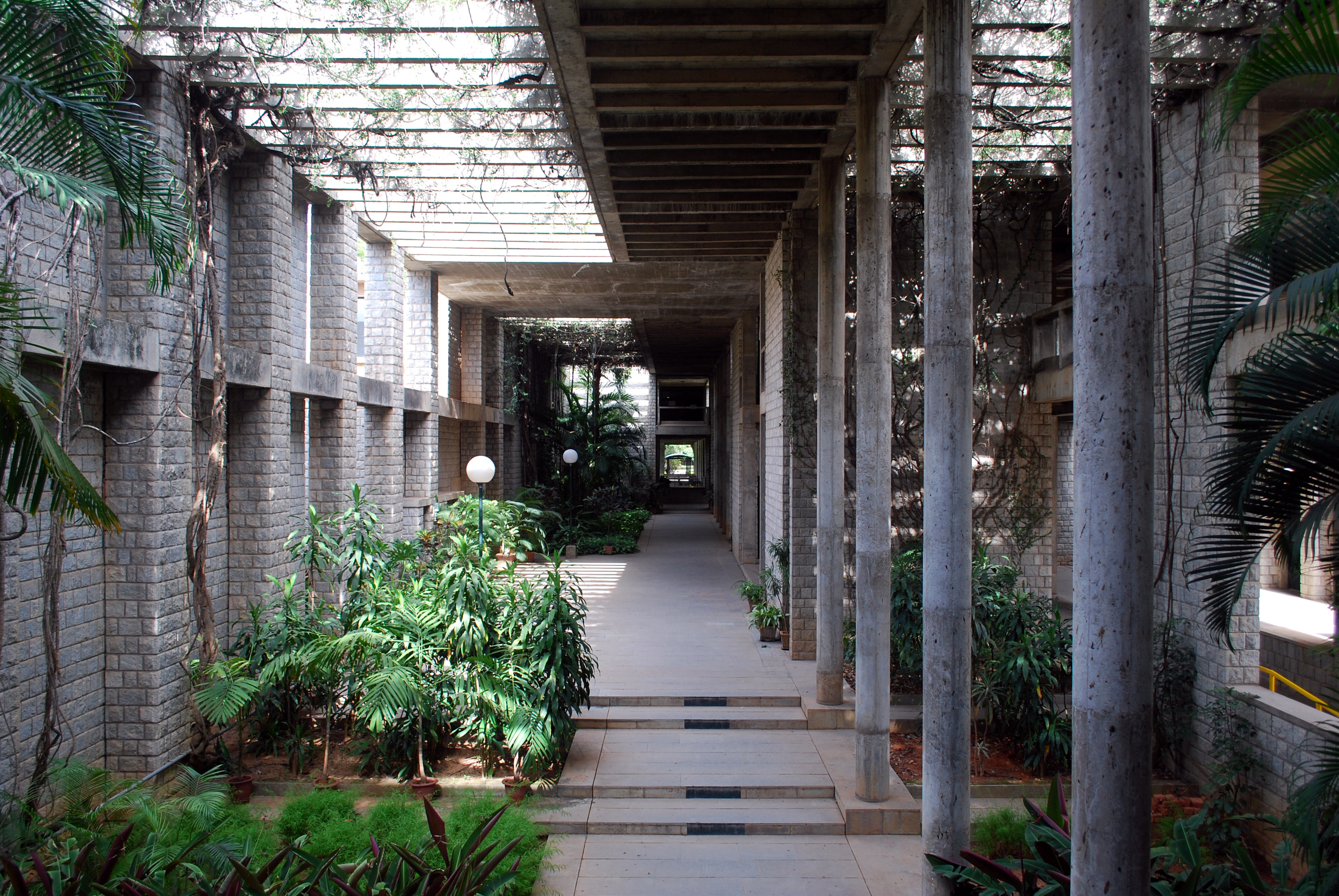
One of the high ceiling hallways

The design of IIMB campus was led by the famous architect B.V. Doshi, FRIBA, the 2018 Pritzker Architecture Prize laureate, RIBA 2022 Royal Gold Medal recipient, and Padma Bhushan awardee. He had worked with the pioneering architect Le Corbusier in Paris, and had later assisted the renowned architect Louis Kahn, FRIBA in designing IIMA buildings. He had also founded and designed the School of Architecture in 1966. His firm, the erstwhile M/s Stein, Doshi, & Bhalla (aided by M/s Kanvinde & Rai) was commissioned to design the campus. The design was inspired by the 16th-century historic city of Fatehpur Sikri near Agra, and the 13th-century Meenakshi Temple in Madurai, along with the lush gardens of Bangalore, also known as the Garden City of India. The first director, N.S. Ramaswamy, had asked Doshi to create a campus to reflect the ethos of the Bangalore city - "green and alive [sic]".

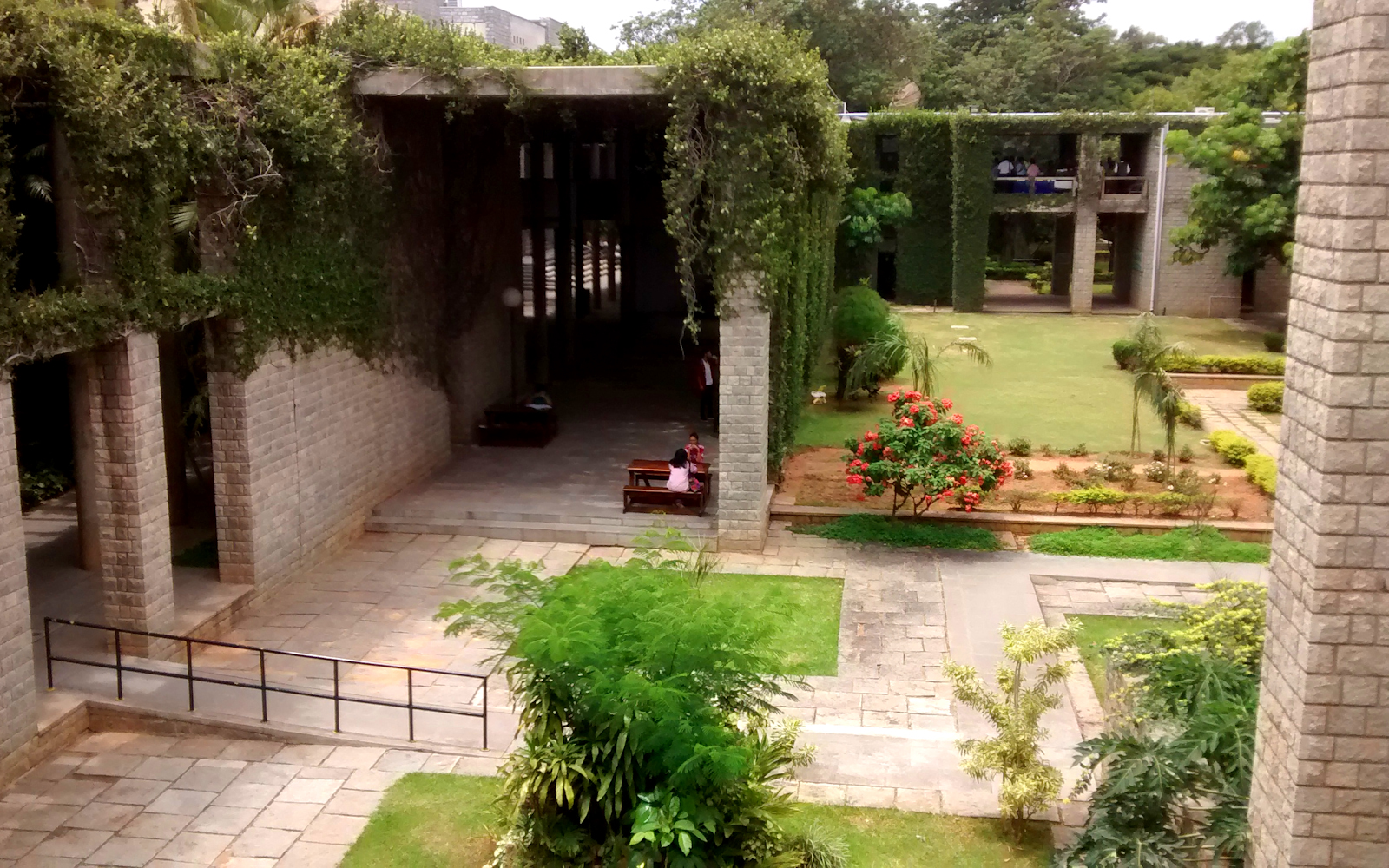
Central Pergola

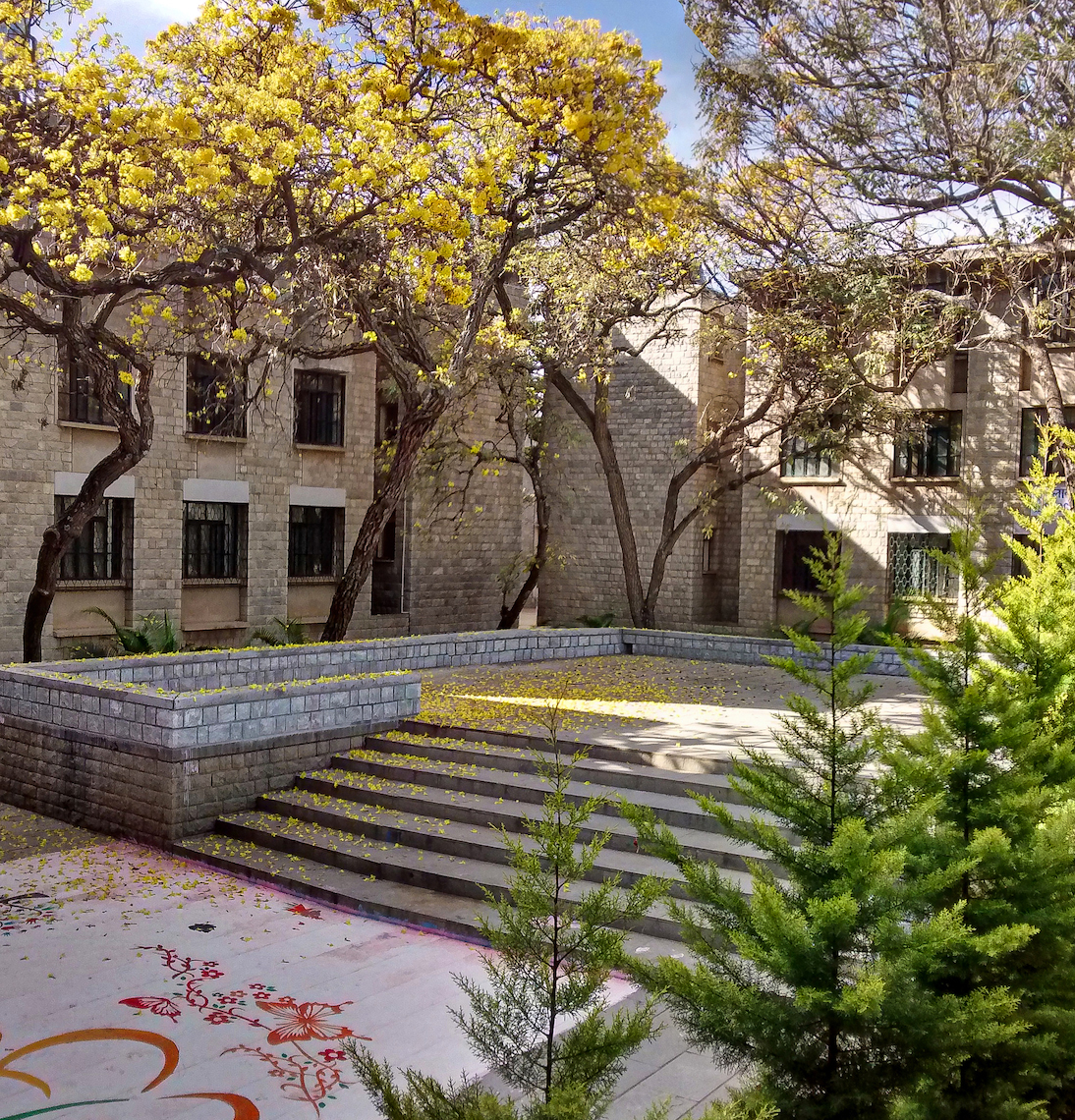
L-Square in Hostel Blocks

Light and Environment were the cornerstones of the poly-nuclear design, a hybrid of Indian traditional architecture and principles of Team 10 modernists. The notable architectural elements include the high passageways, trellises, open quadrangles with space for greenery, sunlight beaming in through the pergolas, semi-open corridors, geometrical roofs, rough texture finish, and Kota-stone flooring. The design is such that "an interplay of walls-n-openings, lights-n-shadows, and solids-n-voids changes the character of the main building during different times of the day... [sic]". The 54,000 sq-m original complex is built of hand-chipped granite stonemasonry, and exposed concrete. The campus design began in 1977, and the construction of buildings was finished in 1983. The greening effort started later in 1991, and by the 2020s the campus had a green cover of 62 acres with around 30,000 trees, and 50+ ground re-charge wells. Subsequent buildings, like the 6,500 sq-m New Classroom Complex, were designed by Sanjay Mohe's Mindspace Architects.

The IIMB campus design has won accolades globally. The 'T' (style magazine of The New York Times) ranked it 17th in their list of The 25 Most Significant Works of Post War Architecture. When Dezeen asked thirteen top Indian architecture firms to list their favourite building, IIMB was the only building chosen by more than one, and called it "the most influential piece of (Indian) modern architecture". The famous architectural historian and critic William J.R. Curtis labelled the IIMB campus as a "model" for educational institutions. The institutional project also finds mention in the citation of the 2018 Pritzker Architecture Prize for Doshi. The Architectural Digest India included IIMB in the list of 6 Educational Institutions in India with Exceptional Architecture. The GQ (India) magazine ranked it #2 in the list of 7 Most Beautiful Universities and Scenic Campuses.

=== Management Development Centre ===
The MDC is to fulfill the executive-education (Exec.Ed.) and corporate-oriented needs of the institute. It offers facilities for seminars, conferences, sessions, etc. It also has accommodation for corporate-executives, and open space for events. A New MDC (NMDC) on the IIMB's second campus at Jigani was inaugurated by the Vice President of India on 1 March 2023.

=== Library ===
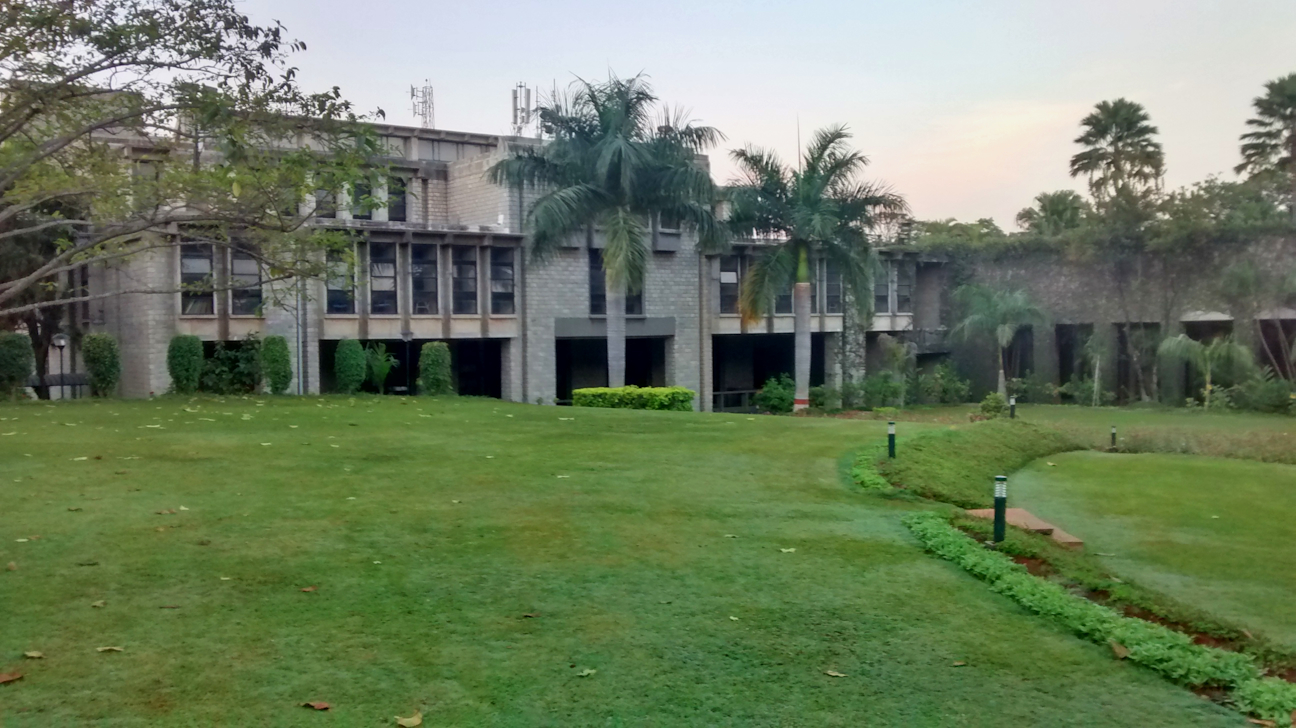
View of Library from Amphitheatre

The IIMB library is a four-level 55,000 sq-ft floor-area building abutting the academic block, and renovated in 2016-19. It also offers membership to non-IIMB entities (individuals or organizations).

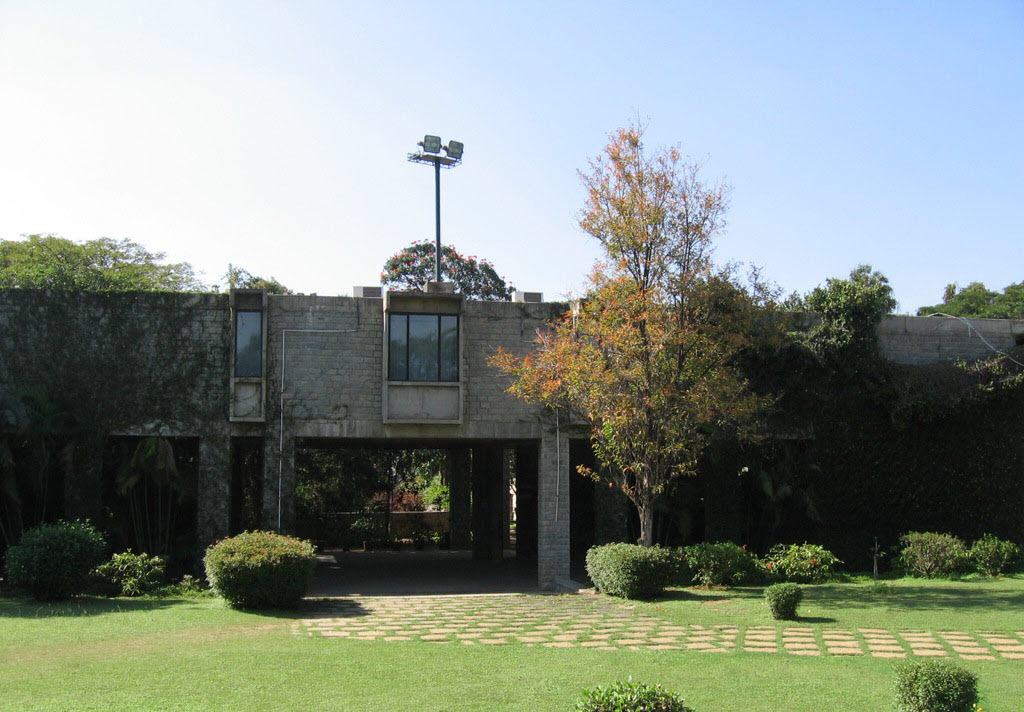
Computer Centre

As of 2025, it had 163,000+ printed books, 9000+ journals (incl. e-journals), 20+ newspapers (in six languages), and 42,000+ issues of periodicals, predominantly in business and management areas. It also offers 3500+ eBooks, 1400+ audio-visual resources, OPAC catalogue, and Union Catalogue of the IIM Libraries Consortium. It provides information services like EBSCO, WoS, Nexis Uni, Factiva, Gartner, UNIDO, CMIE, Euromonitor Passport, etc. It also has E-ShodhSindhu (eSS) subscriptions like J-Gate, Project Muse, ISID Database, NDLI eBooks/Archives, ShodhShuddhi PDS system, etc.

The library also houses a Library Data Centre with special computer systems for electronic-data needs of the institute. It provides access to 110+ e-Databases, and professional data services like the Bloomberg Terminal, Refinitiv Eikon, Thomson Reuters SDC, LSEG D&A Datastream, Statista, NielsenIQ, etc.

== Administration ==
=== Governance ===
IIM Bangalore is legally an educational society with elevated privileges of a body corporate as defined in the IIM Act, 2017. Furthermore, the IIM (Amendment) Act, 2023 accorded the status of Visitor (ex officio) to the President of India. The Board of Governors is the primary executive body of IIMB, while the Coordination Forum is a single body for all IIMs to communicate with the Indian government. IIMB is administered by the following structure:

- Visitor
  - Board of Governors, and Chairperson
    - Director of IIM
      - Academic Council
      - Audit Committee
      - Deans (all functions)

=== Organisation ===
The institute is operationally headed by the Director who acts as the chief executive officer. The Director is assisted by several officials as follows:

- Director
  - Dean (Administration), in-charge of: HR, Finance, Facilities, Infrastructure, Communications
  - Dean (Faculty), in-charge of: Areas, Centres of Excellence, Initiatives, R&P, IMR Journal
  - Dean (Programmes), in-charge of: Academics, ExecEd, IIMBx, MDC, CDS, International Affairs
  - Dean (Alumni and Development), in-charge of: Alumni Relations, Institute Development

== Academics ==
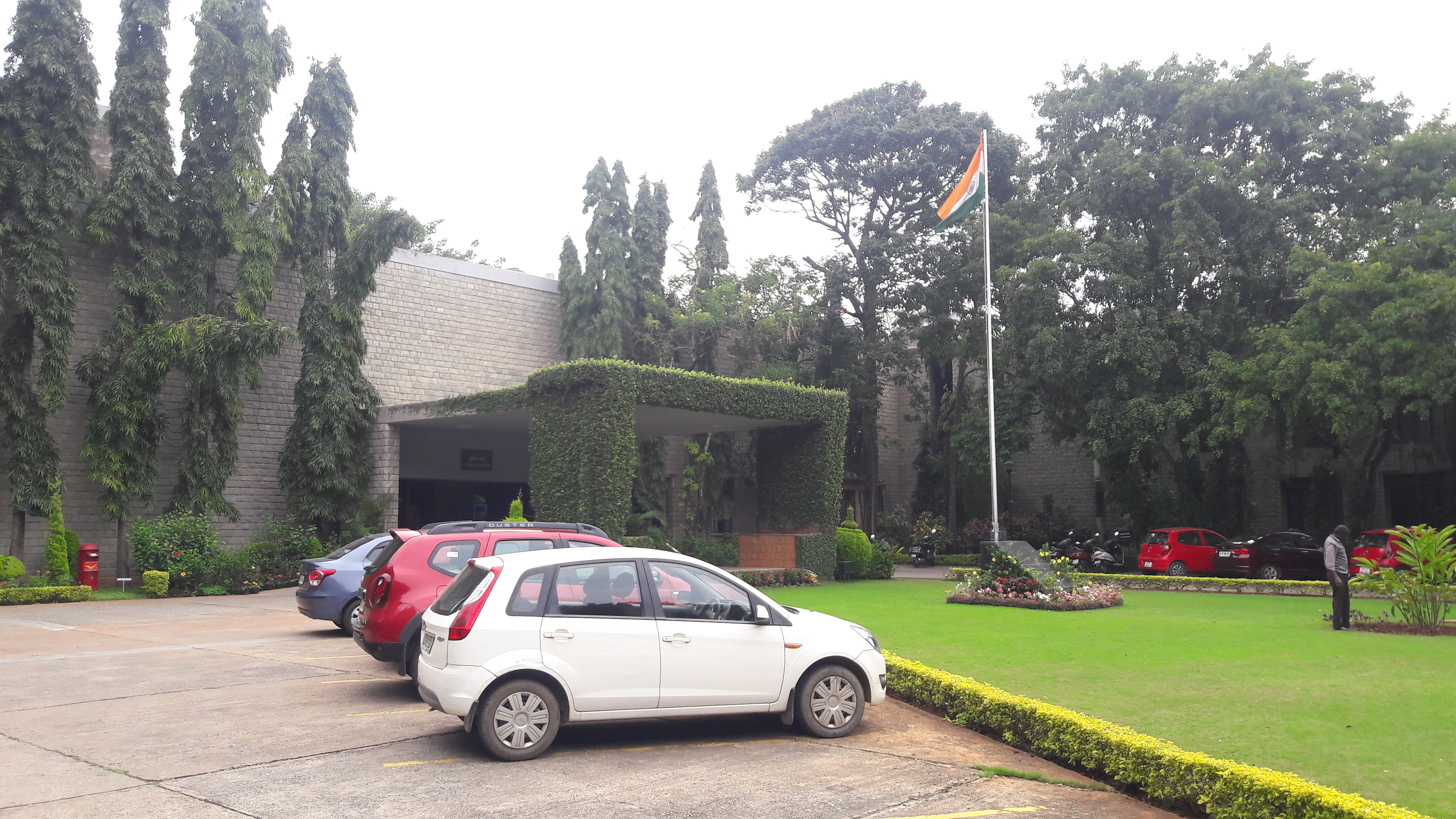
Entrance to the Academic Block

IIM Bangalore is an autonomous institute of higher learning in management. It does not officially need an affiliation to a university, and also does not require institute-level or course-level accreditation from government bodies like the NAAC or the NBA. Though, it has been internationally accredited by the EFMD EQUIS since 2010. The IIM Act (2017) made IIMB an Institute of National Importance, and empowered it to award degrees instead of just diplomas. Thereafter, in March 2018, IIM Bangalore became the first IIM to award an MBA degree to its passing-out students.

=== Degree programmes ===
PG degree-granting programmes have been the academic focus since inception. Apart from the five-year doctoral programme (called FPM) for a Ph.D., there are four MBA programmes: two-year MBA (called PGP), one-year full time residential MBA (EPGP), two-year specialised MBA in Business Analytics (PGPBA), and part-time (weekend) MBA (PGPEM) for working professionals. There is also a Master of Management Studies programme in Public Policy (PGPPM).

UG degree programmes were launched in mid-2020s as IIMB sensed a lack of good business-related analytical courses at that level in the Indian ecosystem. In 2024, an online programme for BBA in Digital Business & Entrepreneurship (DBE) was launched. Two four-your B.Sc. (Hons.) courses in economics and data science launched in 2026.

=== Other programmes ===
In 2019, the institute signed an MoU with the MSDE (GoI) to train Fellows for a PG certificate in Public Policy & Management under Phase-I (pilot) of Mahatma Gandhi National Fellowship programme as part of the World Bank funded SANKALP scheme. The trainees went on to work with District Administration in 69 districts across 6 states. In 2021, this program was scaled up in Phase-II to cover all Indian districts, and involved eight other IIMs with IIMB as the anchoring institute.

=== Executive education ===
IIMB offers Executive Education (Exec.Ed.) programmes for private corporations, government officials, entrepreneurs, and non-profit organisations. They cover all levels of functionaries, whether middle-management, or senior leadership. The wide-range provides flexibility in:

- duration (3-6 days, or 15 days)
- schedule (round the year start-dates)
- content (readymade, or customised)
- delivery modes (in-person, online, hybrid, or blended)

=== Reputation and rankings ===
Institute rankings

Business – international
- QS (MBA) (2024): 48
- QS (MBA-Asia) (2024): 8
- QS (EMBA) (2024): 41
- QS (EMBA-Asian) (2024): 8
- Financial Times (MBA) (2024): 47
- Financial Times (MiM) (2022): 31

Business/Management – India
- NIRF (2024): 2
- Business Today (2023): 3
- Outlook India (2024): 2

IIMB was stuck with the "PSU" or "state-corp" image till the late 1980s as it was initially steered to serve govt entities. This was in contrast to IIMC and IIMA which were set up in 1961 as full-fledged B-Schools in collaboration with prestigious American ones like MIT Sloan and HBS respectively. However, the transformation efforts improved the institute's standing, and by the 2000s, IIMB was competing for the top spot among B-Schools in India.

Worldwide, the Financial Times has ranked IIMB at 57th in the Global MBA Ranking 2025, and 28th in the world in the Top 100 Masters in Management 2025 list. Quacquarelli Symonds ranked IIMB 52nd in the world and 8th in Asia in the Global MBA Rankings 2026. The institute was also ranked 50th in the world and 10th in Asia-Pacific in the QS Global Executive MBA Rankings 2025. QS World University Rankings placed it 30th in Management and 51-60 in Business Analytics in their Business Master’s Rankings 2026.

SMBG's Eduniversal ranked IIMB 1st in Central Asia region (incl. Indian subcontinent) sixteen years in a row from 2008 to 2024, and conferred 5 Palms of Excellence (the first and one of only two in the region). Business platform LinkedIn ranked IIMB 27th and 20th in its Top MBA Programs list in 2024 and 2025 respectively. In Exec.Ed., the Financial Times ranks IIMB 51st in open category (AMPs, etc), and 46th in custom category.

In India, IIM Bangalore was ranked by NIRF as 1st in 2016-19, and 2nd in 2020-25 among management institutes. It was ranked third by Business Today magazine in their India's Best B-Schools yearly ranking in 2023. Outlook India placed it at 2nd position in their Outlook-ICARE India's Best Public B-School 2024 rankings. The Fortune India magazine ranked it third in their Best B-Schools India overall ranking in 2022-24.

== Research ==
The founding vision of IIMB emphasised equal focus on imparting education, and conducting research. IIMB reinforced focus on research in 21st century as part of its aforementioned turnaround. A Research and Publication (R&P) Committee is in-charge of operational affairs of all research at the institute.

There are twelve Centres of Excellence, six in management areas, and six in special areas. They are Centre for Capital Markets & Risk Management (CCMRM), Centre for Corporate Governance & Sustainability (CCGS), Centre for Management Communication (CenComm), Supply Chain Management Centre (SCMC), Centre for Software & IT Management (CSITM), Centre for Entrepreneurial Learning (NSRCEL), Centre for Public Policy (CPP), Centre for Digital Public Goods (CDPG), Centre for Teaching & Learning (CTL), Mizuho India-Japan Study Centre (MIJSC), Israel Centre, and Tony James Centre for Private Equity & Venture Capital (TJC). The last three are recent - TJC was launched in 2025, while Japan and Israel centres were founded in 2017. CenComm and CPP are the centres with full-time faculty. The CCGS was among the first to be accredited as a National Centre of Excellence by the National Foundation for Corporate Governance (NFCG). TJC is India's first global centre of excellence for PEVC established with support from Mathew Cyriac, a gold medallist alumnus.

The major research efforts include Initiatives on Consumer Insights (ICI), and Real Estate Research Initiative (RERI), apart from two labs launched in 2010s - Behavioral Sciences Lab (BSL), and Data Centre and Analytics Lab (DCAL). International B-School partners in research are Ivey Western (CA), SMU (Singapore), Exeter (UK), UBC Sauder (CA), and Deakin University (AU). Also, there is a case-studies agreement with Harvard Business Publishing, and collaborative research projects have been done with the likes of King's College London.

=== Journal: IIMB Management Review ===
IIMB Management Review (IMR), launched in 1986, is the quarterly-published official journal of IIM Bangalore. It invites manuscripts online, and has a special emphasis on papers that focus on emerging economies. It is produced and hosted by Elsevier, and since 2022 the IMR is a Gold Open Access journal available at ScienceDirect. The IMR has print ISSN 0970-3896, and online e-ISSN 2212-4446.

IMR is a peer-reviewed academic journal with a double-blind review process. All submissions go for a preliminary review at the editorial desk, and appropriate ones are sent to an Associate Editor who may either reject them or assign two reviewers.

=== IMR Doctoral Conference ===
The IMR Doctoral Conference (IMRDC) is a premier academic conference for doctoral researchers in management science and associated disciplines. The first conference was held on 27 November 2009, and is now organised annually by the IMRDC Secretariat. It openly invites doctoral students in management research from across India and international colleges.

== Incubator: NSRCEL ==
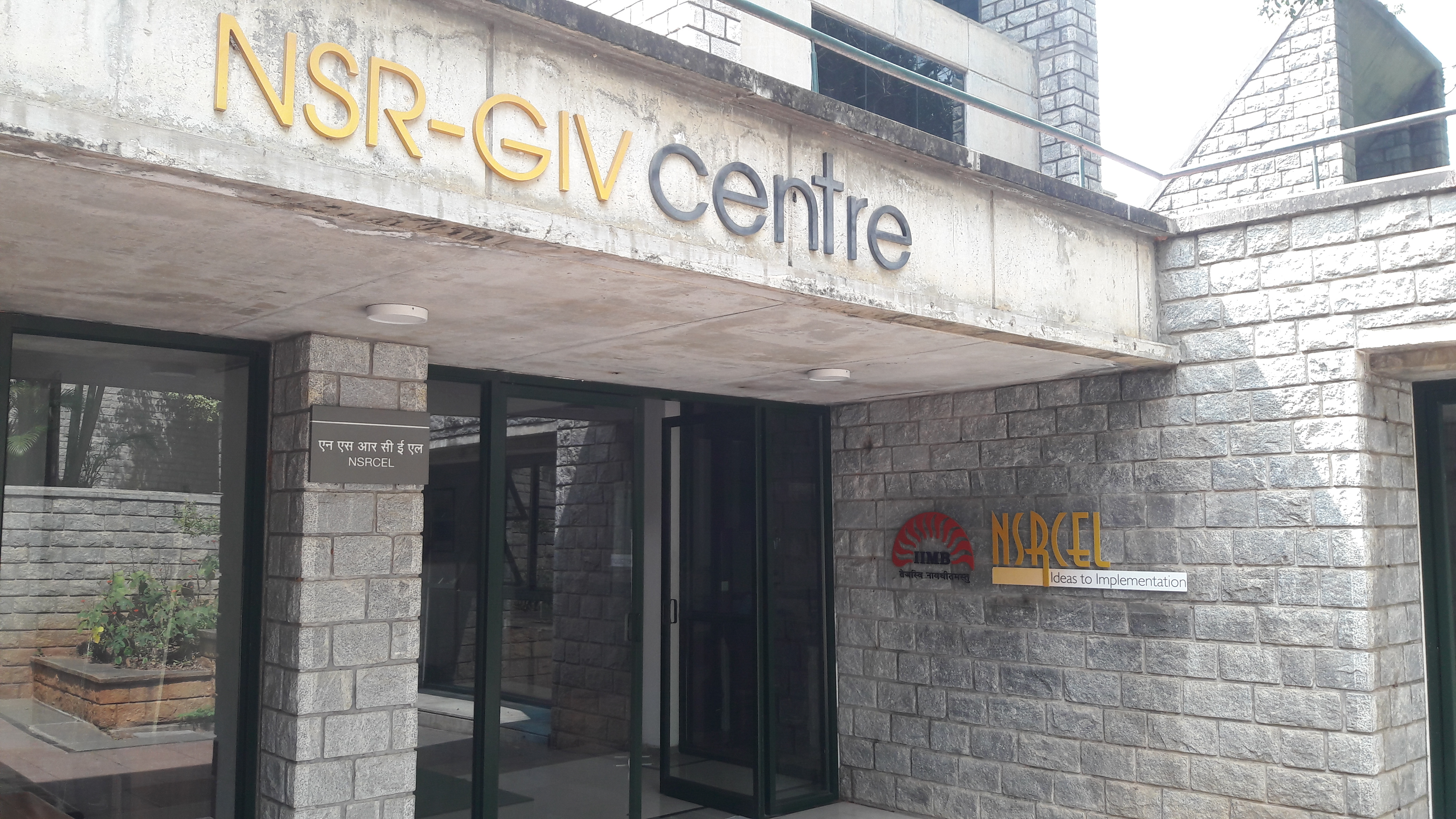
NSRCEL Entrance in IIMB

=== History ===
In 1999-2000, Mr. Nadathur S. Raghavan, the Co-Founder and then Joint MD of Infosys Technologies, in association with Global Internet Ventures (GIV), donated INR 130 million to upgrade the Centre for Entrepreneurial Studies at IIMB. Thus, the NS Raghavan Centre for Entrepreneurial Learning (NSRCEL) had its inception in December 1999 to serve as the innovation and entrepreneurial hub of IIMB. It operates out of the 18,000 sq-ft NSR-GIV Centre building in the IIMB campus, and acts as a not-for-profit incubator for new business ventures as well as social causes. It ramped-up activities in 2010s, including an exclusive partnership with Keiretsu Forum. In 2017, NITI Aayog selected NSRCEL for INR 100 million scale-up support. In 2024, Government of Karnataka allocated INR 132 million for a FinTech Centre of Excellence at NSRCEL.

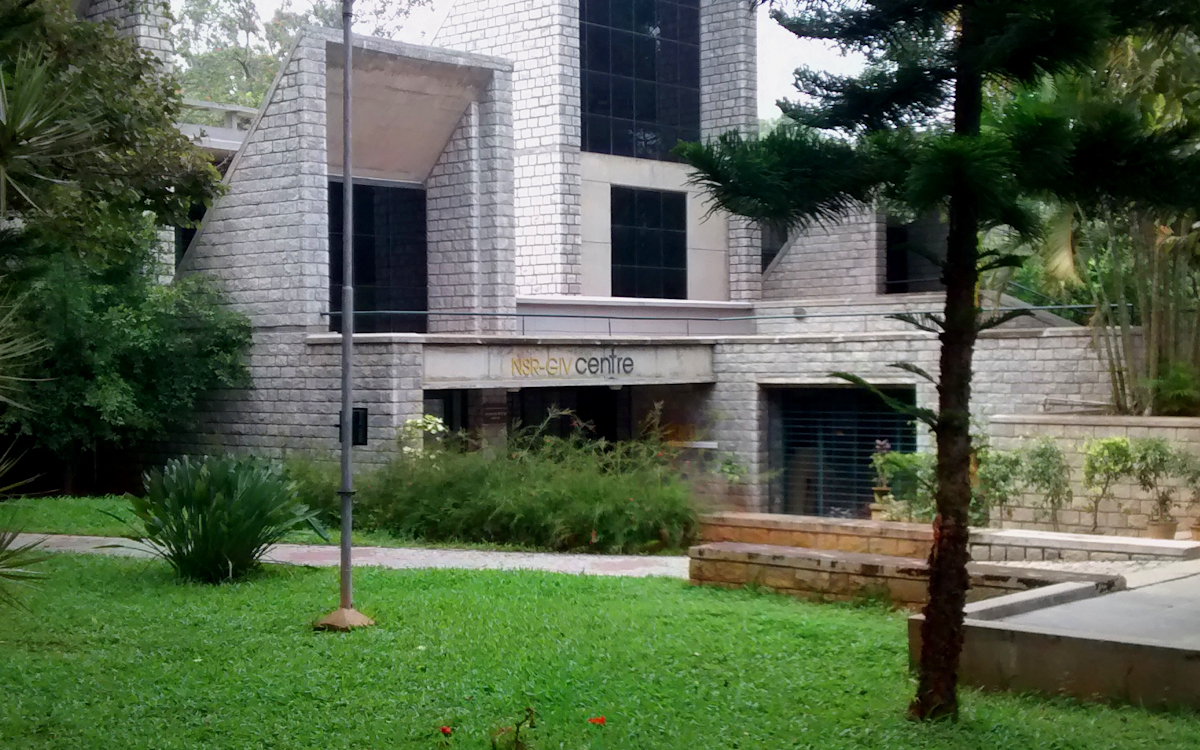
NSRCEL in NSR-GIV Centre

=== Programmes ===
NSRCEL annually organises SummitUp, its flagship entrepreneurial conference, and invites ecosystem members. It collaborated with Texas Instruments and DST (GoI) to organise India Innovative Challenge Design Contest (IICDC) in 2016-19. It offers special funds and customised programs depending on: stage of venture, product category, founder demographic, etc. In late 2023, a Campus Founders programme was started to assist the college-based start-ups across India. Many of these programs are/were in partnership with Maruti Suzuki, Capgemini, HUL, Alstom, Infineon Technologies, NASSCOM, Pernod Ricard, SIDBI, Kotak Mahindra Bank, etc.

=== Women startups ===
In January 2018, NSRCEL, aided by Goldman Sachs and DST (GoI), launched the Women Start-up Programme (WSP), India's first customised program for female entrepreneurs, after a successful pilot in 2016-17. It included a five-week MOOC, and two boot-camps in collaboration with partner institutes, followed by incubation and funding. In late 2018, Goldman Sachs built on WSP to expand their (since 2008) initiative 10,000 Women in India. And in 2023, the GS 10KW alumni were offered the Finance For Growth program to help raise capital. Fourth iteration onwards, WSP was sponsored by Kotak. The National Commission for Women partnered with India SME Forum and NSRCEL in 2021 to launch a fully-sponsored programme called Empowering Women Through Entrepreneurship for giving management lessons to 5,000 budding women entrepreneurs. The Government of Karnataka collaborated with IIMB in 2023 to launch the Swavalambane programme to train rural women entrepreneurs under the National Rural Livelihood Mission funded by the World Bank.

== IIMBx ==
IIMBx is the digital learning initiative of IIM Bangalore, launched in 2014, and run by the IIMBx Digital Learning Foundation. The aim was to broaden reach, and MOOCs were considered crucial to future education. Apart from presence on third-party platforms, IIMBx's own in-house digital platform based on Open edX was also developed.

In 2014, IIMB became the first Indian B-School to offer Massive Open Online Courses (MOOCs) in partnership with edX – an initiative of Harvard and MIT. Courseware was ramped up in 2015 for mass outreach. In 2021, IIMBx also facilitated the IIMB partnership with NCW and India SME Forum to provide the six-week MOOC-based Do Your Venture program to five thousand aspiring women entrepreneurs.

In 2017, the courses were offered on the Government of India's SWAYAM platform, and IIMB was appointed as the National Coordinator for management. The courses are also used to educate Indian civil servants via the iGOT-Karmayogi e-learning platform of the govt-owned non-profit SPV Karmayogi Bharat, established in 2022 for implementing NPCSCB - Mission Karmayogi of the DoP&T (GoI).

== Career assistance ==
The Career Development Services (CDS) unit is responsible for providing career related services to the students of IIMB. It aids in resume verifications to ensure quality and fidelity. It coordinates with firms in conducting hiring process for internships and jobs. The Placement Committee (PlaceCom) works under the CDS, the latter being headed by a Chairperson.

== Student life ==
Apart from seats on the aforementioned Academic Council and Placement Committee, the students can join official student-bodies which consist of clubs, mini-clubs, local-chapters, and societies. They are governed by an apex body called the Students Affairs Council.

The clubs responsible for major events are: Forum for Industrial Interaction (FII), Cultural Committee (CulCom), Sports Council, and Entrepreneurship & Innovation Cell (EnI). There is also a local-club of Toastmasters International (called Focal), and a local-chapter of SPIC MACAY. The others can be categories based on their primary function:

- clubs/mini-clubs to explore specific area of management (consulting, finance, etc.)
- cells/committees assisting institute work (audit, alumni affairs, etc.)
- clubs/mini-clubs to pursue personal interests/hobbies (dramatics, adventure, etc.)
- clubs/mini-clubs for contemporary issues (environment, social initiatives, etc.)

=== Business events ===
In 2025, IIMB amalgamated its Vista and Eximius events into one summit named Venix. FII annually organised Vista, the international business summit hosted by IIM Bangalore. The three-day conclave brought together leaders from various fields of management and firms from multiple industries to a platform that let students learn from professionals through events, competitions and case studies. Vista also incorporated guest speaker sessions, having previously invited Devi Shetty, Mukesh Ambani, Prahlad Kakkar, Kumar Mangalam Birla, Kamal Haasan, Kiran Mazumdar Shaw, Gurucharan Das, Santosh Hegde, Arun Shourie, Gul Panag, M J Akbar, Nandita Das, Narain Karthikeyan, and Shobhaa De.

The annual entrepreneurship summit Eximius was organized by EnI Cell. It invited entrepreneurs to showcase their products and ventures to a willing audience, among other things. The event had hosted several eminent speakers including Shashi Tharoor, Kiran Mazumdar-Shaw, Piyush Pandey, Mallika Sarabhai, Kris Gopalakrishnan, Kiran Bedi, Rashmi Bansal, Shaheen Mistri, Harish Hande, and D. R. Mehta.

IIMB's Women In Management (WIM) club annually organises the Women Leadership Summit. It seeks to build women-inclusive mind-set in students, entrepreneurs, and corporates. The event makes use of interactions with successful female personalities like Vinita Bali, Malavika Harita, Sneha Priya, Lakshmi Ishwar, Wilma Rodrigues, Nirmala Sankaran, Neeta Revankar, Dr. Gita Sen, Gauri Jayaram, Sanjaya Sharma, etc.

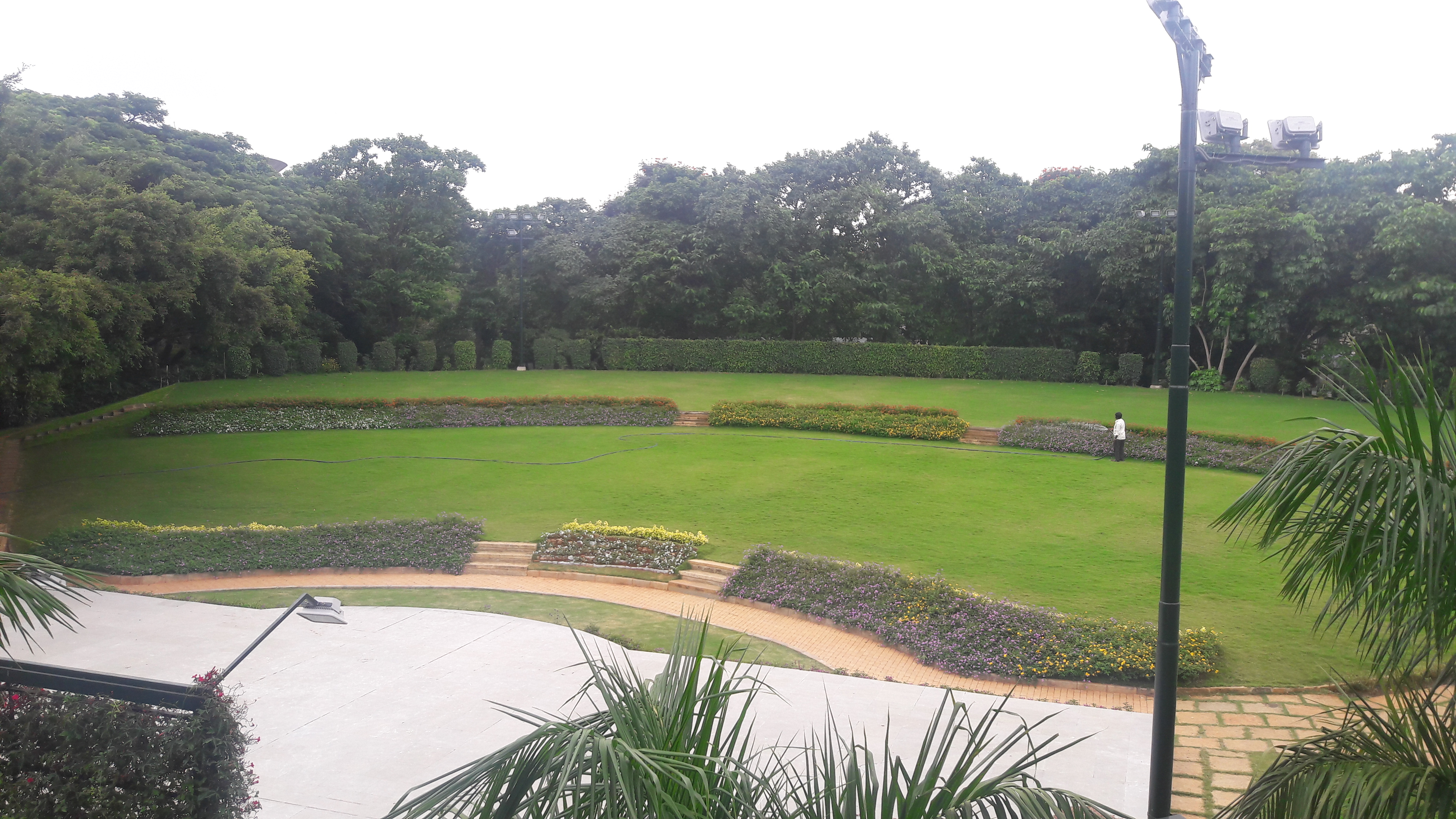
Open amphitheatre for events

=== Cultural events ===
The annual cultural festival of IIM Bangalore is called Unmaad. The three-day event features performances in music, drama, and dance, apart from events like quizzes, debates, street plays, professional concerts, fashion shows, etc. The event has hosted performances by prominent artistes including Farhan Akhtar, Shankar–Ehsaan–Loy, KK, Kailash Kher, Lucky Ali, Strings, Jethro Tull, Indian Ocean, etc.

The dusk-to-dawn event Yamini is a full-night Indian classical music festival held annually in Bangalore. It is organized by the Society for the Promotion of Indian Classical Music & Culture Amongst Youth (SPIC MACAY), and is hosted at IIMB campus.

=== Sports events ===
IIMB has arguably the best sports facilities of any elite B-School in India. Sangharsh is the annual inter-IIM competitive sports event with participation from IIMA, IIMB, IIMC, and IIML. It is hosted by one of the four IIMs. Sangram is an annual inter-college sports competition among IIMs of southern India (Bangalore, Trichy, Vizag, and Kozhikode).

== Alumni ==
=== Alumni Association ===
IIMB Alumni Association (IIMBAA) is the official association for the alumni of IIM Bangalore. As of 2024, IIMBAA had ~15 chapters in India and abroad. An annual gathering event called Anusmaran (meaning: "reminiscence" in Sanskrit) is organised by all chapters. LSquare, named on the social-spot in the old hostel blocks, is the official alumni e-newsletter. Other events include The CEO Conclave, Leadership InsideOut, and many chapter-level opportunities.

=== IIMBue and IIMBueX ===
IIMBue: The IIMBAA Leadership Conclave is the annual leadership summit organized by the alumni. It strives to bring thought-leaders, change-makers, and influencers of the time to interact with IIMB alumni. IIMBueX is the digital form of IIMBue launched in 2021.

=== IIMB Alumni Club ===
In 2023, IIMBAA launched the IIMB Alumni Club. It provides 12,000 sq-ft of exclusive space in the historic 20-acre lush-green premises of the heritage luxury hotel Taj West End. It is operated by the IIMBAA Professional Development Society. There are three kind of memberships - Life, Term, and Corporate, with the first restricted to only the alumni. It offers a cafe, an open-air bar-n-restaurant, and on-demand banquet facilities.

== See also ==
- Indian Institutes of Management
- Institutes of National Importance
- Architects B.V. Doshi and A.P. Kanvinde
- Common Admission Test (CAT)
- Education in India and Higher education in India
