= Joint Management Entrance Test =

Entrance exam in India

Joint Management Entrance Test (JMET) was an admission exam used by some institutes in India as the first step in the admission to postgraduate programs in management. Institutes which used the exams included Indian Institute of Science (IISc) and the IIT Schools of Management. The results of JMET were used to short-list the candidates for subsequent part of the selection process. In 2011 JMET was discontinued and replaced by Common Admission Test (CAT).

== Process ==
The exam was an aptitude test conducted by each of the IITs on a rotation basis. The exam tested the candidate's knowledge of mathematics, data interpretation, logical reasoning and English usage. It was conducted annually in the month of December, and comprised questions in multiple choice format. From 2007 onwards sectional cut-offs were introduced. Candidates clearing all the four sectional cut-offs receive an All India Rank (AIR). The group discussion and or personal interview calls were given out on basis of a candidates AIR and overall profile which included past academics, extra-curricular and work experience, and it was not mandatory that all candidates who are declared as qualified by the exam will be called group discussion and interview. Calling the candidates for such later process of selection was the prerogative of the admitting institute.

== Format ==
The question paper is divided into four sections with a total of 120 questions in each section. For each correct answer, one mark is awarded and for each incorrect answer, a penalty of 0.25 marks is applied. Approximately three hours are allotted for the duration of the exam. The four sections include and the number of questions are:

Section number	Name of Section	Number of questions
1	Verbal Communication	30
2	Logical Reasoning	30
3	Quantitative Ability	30

== See also ==
- List of Public service commissions in India
