= N. S. Ramaswamy =

Indian engineer (1926–2012)

- Born: 2 March 1926; Puthur, Thrissur district, Kerala, India
- Died: 17 September 2012 (aged 86); Bengaluru, Karnataka, India
- Other name: Cartman Ramaswamy
- Occupations: Management academic Social worker Educationist
- Years active: 1952–2012
- Known for: IIM Bangalore; Social service Institution building
- Spouse: Rajam Parvathi
- Children: A son and a daughter
- Parent: N. R. Srinivasa Iyer
- Awards: Padma Bhushan

N. Srinivasa Iyer Ramaswamy (1926–2012), popularly known as Cartman Ramaswamy, was an Indian engineer, educationist, management academic and writer, and the founder director of the Indian Institute of Management, Bangalore. He was the founder of Centre for Action, Research and Technology for Man, Animal and Nature (CARTMAN), a non governmental organization working for region-relevant and appropriate technology transfer to rural areas and Indian Heritage Academy, an organization involved in propagating Indian cultural traditions. He was also the founder chairman of the Adarsh Vidya Kendra (AVK) Group of educational institutions. The Government of India awarded him the third highest civilian honour of the Padma Bhushan, in 2006, for his contributions to society.

== Biography ==
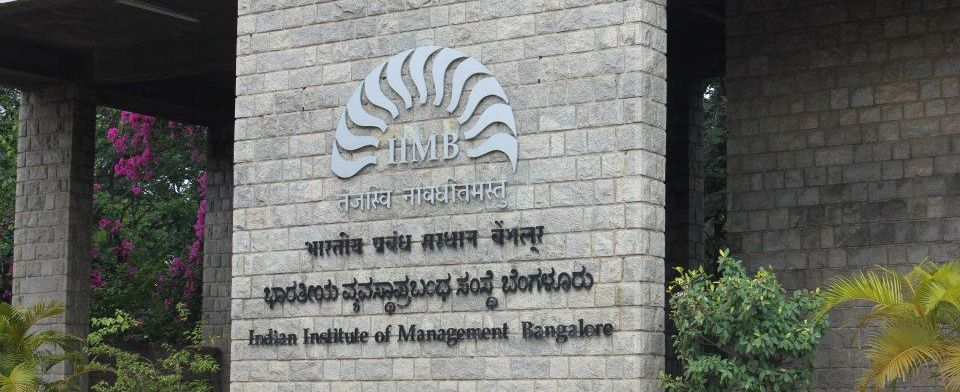
IIMB - Main entrance

Ramaswamy was born in a Tamil brahmin family on 2 March 1926 in Puthur, in Thrissur district of the south Indian state of Kerala to N. R. Srinivasa Iyer, an Indian Police Service officer and the former Inspector-General of Police of Kerala. He did his college studies at Maharaja's College, Kochi, affiliated to the University of Madras during those days, from where he secured a graduate degree in science (BSc) and moved to College of Engineering, Chennai to secure a graduate degree in engineering (BE). He was known to have been active in student politics; he held various positions such as the secretary and president of the College Union and the president of the Students Association at Maharaja's College and was the secretary of the Students Association at Chennai college. His post graduate studies were at various institutions such as the University of Glasgow, Lehigh University and Stanford University and he also did short term training other institutions in Europe and US.

Returning to India, he joined Jamnalal Bajaj Institute of Management Studies in 1952 as a member of faculty and rose to become a professor, thus becoming the first professor of management in Indian university system. His next assignment was at the National Institute of Industrial Engineering (NITIE) and he served there as its director till 1972 during which time the institution introduced the first post graduate program in industrial engineering in India. When the Government of Karnataka decided to establish a national institute of management, he was appointed as the director of the institution and in a span of one year, the Indian Institute of Management Bangalore (IIMB) was inaugurated; the first academic program was started a year later in 1974. He stayed at IIMB till 2011, from 1972 to 1983 as the director and as a member of its Board of Governors till 2011. During this period, he was known to have widened the scope of management studies by introducing areas such as Transport, Power, Education, Health, Agriculture, Rural Development, Public Administration and Political System into its scope and the institution grew to be listed among the top 10 business schools in the Asia-Pacific region.

When he retired from the academic duties of IIMB in 1983, Ramaswamy founded a non governmental organization, Centre for Action Research Technology for Man, Animal and Nature (CARTMAN) for promoting environmental and ecological issues and for introducing appropriate technologies to the rural areas. The organization is known to be active in animal welfare, technology and environmental education and runs a two-acre eco-park in Koramangala in Bangalore which houses an animal welfare centre, a herbarium with medicinal and endangered plants and a crèche for the children of financially compromised families. As a part of bringing in appropriate technology, CARTMAN proposed modern technology for slaughter houses and introduced a modified bullock cart with redesigned wheels and pneumatic tyres, which earned him the moniker, Bullock Cart Ramaswamy. He also served as a consultant to Anna Institute of Management, Chennai and Institute of Management in Kerala, Thiruvananthapuram. It was during this time, he started the Indian Heritage Academy, an organization for the promotion of Indian culture through programs on Yoga, lectures on Indian philosophy and classes in music and dance. When the AVK Group of Educational institutions was started in 2000, he served as its founder chairman. He was associated as an adviser with several government or semi-government bodies such as Airport Authority of India, Ministry of New and Renewable Energy and Parliamentary Committee on Railways. On the global front, he acted as a consultant to the United Nations, Food and Agriculture Organization, United Nations Industrial Development Organization and United Nations Educational, Scientific and Cultural Organization. In 2011, the International Institute of Business Studies (IIBS), a chain of business schools, appointed him as their Chief Mentor. He published several articles and two books, Management for Rural Development and The Management of Political Systems.

Ramaswamy, a National Professor of Management of the Government of India, was awarded the civilian honor of the Padma Bhushan by the government in 2006. He was married to Rajam Parvathi and the couple had a son, Rajan Srinivasan and a daughter, Rajani Chandrasekhar. He died on 17 September 2012 at the age of 86, succumbing to age-related illnesses, at his residence in Koramangala in Bangalore, survived by his wife, children and grand children.

== See also ==
- Indian Institute of Management Bangalore
