= Indian Institute of Management Visakhapatnam =

Business school in Andhra Pradesh, India

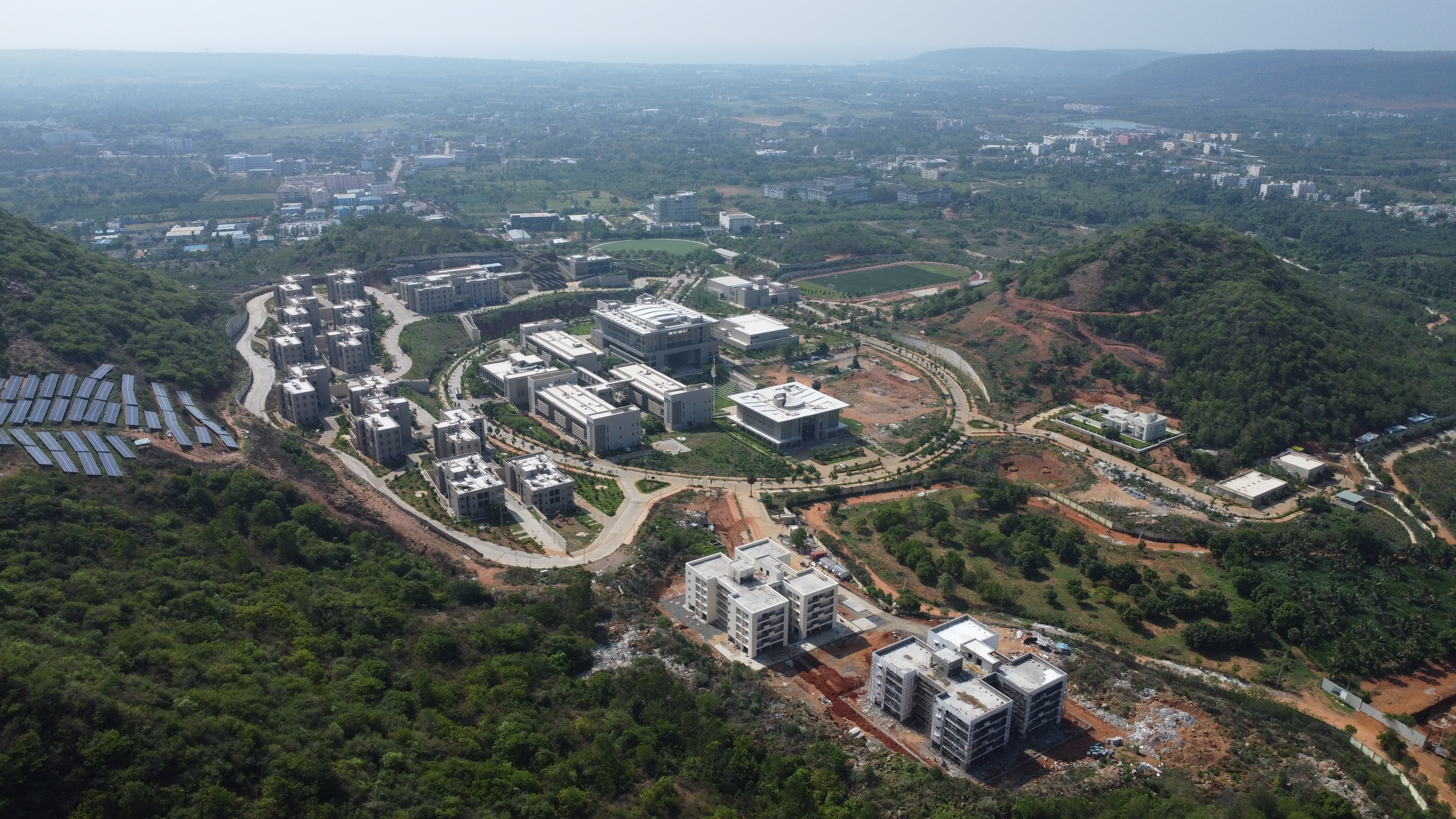
- Aerial view of the campus
- Other name: IIM-V
- Motto: vidyā paraṁ daivatam (ISO)
- Motto in English: Knowledge is the Supreme Deity
- Type: Public business school
- Established: 2015; 11 years ago
- Accreditation: Institute of National Importance
- Affiliations: Ministry of Education (India)
- Chairman: Hari S. Bhartia (Jubilant Bhartia Group)
- Director: Chandrasekhar M.
- Academic staff: 50
- Administrative staff: 85
- Students: 250+
- Location: Visakhapatnam, Andhra Pradesh, India; 17.8814°N 83.3622°E
- Campus: 241 acres (98 ha); Suburban
- Website: www.iimv.ac.in

The Indian Institute of Management Visakhapatnam (IIM-Visakhapatnam or IIM-V) is a public business school and Institute of National Importance located in Visakhapatnam, Andhra Pradesh, India. It is one of the twenty-two Indian Institutes of Management. The institution started the first batch of its Post Graduate Program (PGP) in Management from August 2015.

== Academics ==
The institute offers Post Graduate, Doctoral and Executive Education programmes. The Post Graduate Programme in Management, a two-year, full-time residential MBA programme is the flagship programme, offered to candidates admitted through the Common Admission Test. It is a general, fully integrated management programme and includes courses in accounting, behavioral sciences, finance, economics, human resource management, marketing, business operations, public policy, strategy, entrepreneurship and general management. IIM Visakhapatnam also offers two year part-time executive MBA programme for working executives. From 2019, IIMV started its Doctor of Business Administration (DBA) programme under the guidance of its mentor IIMB.

In 2019, IIM Visakhapatnam launched an executive programme one-of-its-kind, Post Graduate Program in Digital Governance and Management. This programme is under the aegis of the National e-Governance Division, Ministry of Electronics and Information Technology.

In 2021, the Institute was one of the 9 IIMs selected to deliver the Mahatma Gandhi National Fellowship program under the SANKALP Scheme of the Ministry of Skill Development and Entrepreneurship to train fellows in Public Policy and Management to work with District Administration

In 2024, IIM Visakhapatnam launched the Post Graduate Program in Management for CFTIs / INIs, a collaborative initiative with Centrally Funded Technical Institutions and Institutes of National Importance to integrate Management education in the final year of studies at the institutions and give a pathway to earning an MBA after 2 years of study. The first batch of the new flagship dual-degree granting PGPMCI Program graduated in 2026.

=== Rankings ===
Institute rankings

Business/Management – India
- NIRF (2024): 26

IIM Visakhapatnam was ranked 26 by the National Institutional Ranking Framework (NIRF) management ranking in 2024. IIM Visakhapatnam comes under top 15 IIMs, heading among the new generation IIMs.

== Campus and location ==
IIM Visakhapatnam is initially functioning out of the campus of Andhra University, while the permanent campus would come up at Gambhiram on the outskirts of city. In the temporary campus the classrooms are designed as per the Harvard Business School model, as the teaching methodology is case study based. "This semicircle gallery model helps better interaction between the teacher and the students", as per Sourav Mukherji, Dean- Programmes (IIM-B). The land acquisition for the permanent campus is almost complete. The foundation stone for the new campus was laid by Union Human Resource Development Minister, Smriti Irani on 17 January 2015. The new campus is fully functional on a 241-acre area. in Gambheeram Village.

The institute is headed by Director, Prof. Chandrasekhar Mylavarapu, an IIT Bombay, IIT Delhi Alumnus and ex-Director of ASCI, Hyderabad.

== See also ==
- Indian Institutes of Management
- Indian Institute of Management Bangalore
