= Indian Institutes of Management Act, 2017 =

Act of the Parliament of India

Indian Institutes of Management Act, 2017 Bhāratīya Prabaṃdhana Saṃsthāna Adhiniyama, 2017
- State Emblem of India

Parliament of India
- Long title: An Act to declare certain Institutes of management to be institutions of national importance with a view to empower these institutions to attain standards of global excellence in management, management research and allied areas of knowledge and to provide for certain other matters connected therewith or incidental thereto.
- Citation: Act no. 33 of 2017
- Territorial extent: Whole of India
- Passed by: Lok Sabha
- Passed: 28 July 2017
- Passed by: Rajya Sabha
- Passed: 19 December 2017
- Assented to: 31 December 2017 (by President of India, Ramnath Kovind)
- Commenced: 31 January 2018
- Effective: 31 January 2018

Legislative history

First chamber: Lok Sabha
- Bill title: The Indian Institutes of Management Bill, 2017
- Bill citation: Bill no. 20-C of 2017
- Introduced by: Prakash Javadekar (as Minister of Human Resources Development)
- Introduced: 9 February 2017

Second chamber: Rajya Sabha
- Bill title: The Indian Institutes of Management Bill, 2017
- Member(s) in charge: Prakash Javadekar (as Minister of Human Resources Development)

Related legislation
- The Delhi University Act, 1922; All India Institute of Medical Sciences Act, 1956; The Institutes of Technology Act, 1961; National Institutes of Technology Act, 2007

Summary
- The Act provides further autonomy to Indian Institutes of Management by declaring them as institutions of national importance.
- Status: In force

The Indian Institute of Management Act, 2017 (IAST: Bhāratīya Prabaṃdhana Saṃsthāna Adhiniyama, 2017) is an Indian legislation. The Act declared the Indian Institutes of Management as institutions of national importance and enabled them to offer degrees and make substantial changes in their administration.

== Premise ==
The bill was approved by the Union Cabinet on 24 January 2017.

The Act was introduced as a bill in the Lok Sabha by the Minister of Human Resource Development, Prakash Javadekar, on 9 February 2017. The bill was passed by the Lok Sabha on 28 July 2017, and by the Rajya Sabha on 19 December 2017. After receiving the President's assent, the bill became an Act on 31 December 2017.

== Provisions ==
The Act declares Indian Institutes of Management as institutions of national importance and grants them the power to grant degrees.

=== Board of governors ===
The Act provides for the creation of a boards of governors, which would act as the principal executive body for each IIM, and would appoint one director for each IIM, whose pay is ₹225,000 in seventh pay commission but who is entitled to a variable pay.

The board of governors would have a maximum of nineteen members including one chairperson of the board; a nominee each from central and state governments; two members of the faculty; four eminent personalities from fields including education and industry, one of whom has to be a woman, and; the director of the institute.

=== Academic council ===
The Act provides for the creation of an academic council for each IIM, which is the principal academic body under the act and which would decide the: (a) academic content; (b) criteria and processes for admissions to course; and (c) guidelines for conduct of examinations.

The academic council would comprise: (a) the director; (b) deans in charge of academics, research, student affairs and other such functions of the institute; (c) chairs and coordinators of various areas, programmes, faculties, centres, departments and schools of the institute; (d) all full-time faculty members at the level of professor and; (e) members, by invitation of the board — on the recommendation of the director — who are eminent in the fields of industry, finance, management, academics and public administration.

=== Coordination forum ===
The Act provides for the creation of a coordination forum, which would discuss matters pertaining to all IIMs.

The coordination forum would comprise: (a) Higher Education Secretary (ex-officio); (b) two secretaries in charge of management education of state governments in which the institutes are located, by rotation, each year (ex-officio); (c) four chairpersons of institutes, to be nominated by the chairperson of the coordination forum, by rotation for two years; (d) the director of each institute (ex-officio); (e) five eminent personalities—of whom one has to be of a woman—in the fields of academia and public service.

The bill also proposes to incorporate many other changes like audit of institutes by the Comptroller and Auditor General of India.

== Aftermath ==
Even after the commencement of the Act, not all IIMs granted degrees in the first year of its commencement. IIM Lucknow, IIM Ranchi, IIM Rohtak and IIM Ahmedabad granted postgraduate diplomas, whereas IIM Bangalore, IIM Calcutta, IIM Indore, IIM Udaipur, IIM Visakhapatnam granted degrees.

In March 2018, IIMs were told at a meeting with HRD ministry that the Act only empowered them to grant degrees for courses with duration of two years or more. Further, the ministry told the institutes that, for them to confer degrees not mentioned in the University Grants Commission Act, 1956, the institutes would have to seek the government's permission. IIMs were also asked to chalk up their action plan and outline their long-term strategy.
