= Indian Institutes of Management =

Group of 22 management institutes in India

- Other name: IIMs or IIM (singular)
- Type: Public Business School
- Established: 1961; 65 years ago
- Parent institution: Ministry of Education, Government of India
- Budget: ₹251.89 crore (US$27 million) (FY2025–26 est.)
- Visitor: President of India
- Location: 22 cities in India
- Language: English

Location of the functioning (green) IIMs.

The Indian Institutes of Management (IIMs) are Centrally Funded Business Schools for management offering undergraduate, postgraduate, doctoral and executive programmes along with some additional courses in the field of business administration. The establishment of IIMs was initiated by Jawaharlal Nehru, the first prime minister of India, based on the recommendation of the Planning Commission of India.

IIMs were declared institutions of national importance by the Ministry of Human Resource Development (MHRD) after the passage of Indian Institutes of Management Act, 2017. By this act, IIMs were given more autonomy in handling their day-to-day operations. The act changed the IIM governing body from the IIM council to an IIM coordination forum. IIMs were granted much leeway to decide their courses, fees and other related matters. Top IIMs — such as IIM Ahmedabad, IIM Bangalore, IIM Calcutta, IIM Indore, IIM Kozhikode and IIM Lucknow — have featured in top 100 global b-schools by FT MBA Ranking, as well as achieved top 10 rankings among management schools in India, according to the National Institutional Ranking Framework (NIRF) used by the HRD minister of India.

The full time Master of Business Administration (MBA) programmes, are the flagship programs across all IIMs. The full time MBA degree is offered as a two-year Post Graduate Programme in Management (PGP) or the one-year global MBA (EPGP, PGPX, MBAEx, PGPEX-VLM, PGP-BL & IPMX). Eight leading IIMs — IIM Ahmedabad, IIM Bangalore, IIM Calcutta, IIM Indore, IIM Mumbai, IIM Shillong, IIM Lucknow, and IIM Kozhikode — offer the one-year MBA as a full-time programme that follows the global MBA norms. Some IIMs also offer a two-year part-time (executive) MBA for graduates with more work experience.

IIMs only offered diplomas at the end of the full-time programmes. However, since the passage of the IIM Act 2017, all IIMs have started offering Master of Business Administration (MBA). Some IIMs offer the Fellow Programme in Management (FPM), a doctoral programme. The fellowship is considered to be equivalent to a DBA globally. Most IIMs also offer short-term Executive MBA courses and part-time programmes. Some IIMs also offer unique programs, like IIM Bodh Gaya, IIM Rohtak, IIM Ranchi and IIM Indore's Five Year Integrated Programme in Management and IIM Lucknow's Working Managers' Programme of two years. IIM Rohtak is the only IIM which offers a Five Year Integrated Program in Law (BBA+LLB). The IIM's are some of the most competitive business schools in the world to get accepted into, with an acceptance rate of around 3%.

== Institutes ==
List of institutes
Photo	Established	Institute	Abbreviation	Location	State/UT	NIRF Ranking 2025	Website	Notes
	1961	IIM Calcutta	IIM-C	Kolkata	West Bengal	7	https://www.iimcal.ac.in	(Note: Indian Institute of Management Calcutta was the first IIM to be set up in November 1961.)
	1961	IIM Ahmedabad	IIM-A	Ahmedabad	Gujarat	1	https://www.iima.ac.in	(Note: Indian Institute of Management Ahmedabad was the second IIM to be set up, on 16 December 1961.)
	1973	IIM Bangalore	IIM-B	Bengaluru	Karnataka	2	https://www.iimb.ac.in	
	1984	IIM Lucknow	IIM-L	Lucknow	Uttar Pradesh	5	https://www.iiml.ac.in	
	1996	IIM Indore	IIM-I	Indore	Madhya Pradesh	8	https://www.iimidr.ac.in	
	1996	IIM Kozhikode	IIM-K	Kozhikode	Kerala	3	https://www.iimk.ac.in	(Note: Indian Institute of Management Kozhikode was established in 1996 and took its first batch of students in 1997.)
	2007	IIM Shillong	IIM-S	Shillong	Meghalaya	38	https://www.iimshillong.ac.in	
	2010	IIM Raipur	IIM-Raipur	Raipur	Chhattisgarh	15	https://www.iimraipur.ac.in	(Note: Indian Institute of Management Raipur was inaugurated in October 2010.)
	2010	IIM Ranchi	IIM-Ranchi	Ranchi	Jharkhand	18	https://www.iimranchi.ac.in	(Note: Indian Institute of Management Ranchi started operations on 6 July 2010.)
	2010	IIM Rohtak	IIM-Rohtak	Rohtak	Haryana	19	https://www.iimrohtak.ac.in	(Note: Indian Institute of Management Rohtak was inaugurated on 30 June 2010.)
Independence day celebration at IIM Kashipur	2011	IIM Kashipur	IIM-Kashipur	Kashipur	Uttarakhand	23	https://www.iimkashipur.ac.in	(Note: Indian Institute of Management Kashipur on 1 July 2011.)
	2011	IIM Tiruchirappalli	IIM-T	Tiruchirappalli	Tamil Nadu	16	https://www.iimtrichy.ac.in	(Note: Indian Institute of Management Tiruchirappalli was inaugurated in January 2011.)
	2011	IIM Udaipur	IIM-U	Udaipur	Rajasthan	21	https://iimu.ac.in/	(Note: Indian Institute of Management Udaipur started operations on 30 July 2011.)
	2015	IIM Amritsar	IIM Amritsar	Amritsar	Punjab	64	https://www.iimamritsar.ac.in	(Note: Indian Institute of Management Amritsar started operations on 7 August 2015.)
	2015	IIM Bodh Gaya	IIM-BG	Bodh Gaya	Bihar	31	https://www.iimbg.ac.in	(Note: Indian Institute of Management Bodh Gaya was inaugurated on 31 August 2015.)
	2015	IIM Nagpur	IIM-N	Nagpur	Maharashtra	25	https://www.iimnagpur.ac.in	(Note: Indian Institute of Management Nagpur, the first of the six third-generation IIMs, was inaugurated on 26 July 2015.)
	2015	IIM Sambalpur	IIM Sambalpur	Sambalpur	Odisha	34	https://www.iimsambalpur.ac.in	(Note: Indian Institute of Management Sambalpur started operations on 23 September 2015.)
	2015	IIM Sirmaur	IIM Sirmaur	Sirmaur district	Himachal Pradesh	51	http://www.iimsirmaur.ac.in	(Note: Indian Institute of Management Sirmaur started operations on 4 September 2015.)
	2015	IIM Visakhapatnam	IIM-V	Visakhapatnam	Andhra Pradesh	29	https://www.iimv.ac.in	(Note: Indian Institute of Management Visakhapatnam started operations on 21 September 2015.)
	2016	IIM Jammu	IIM-J	Jammu	Jammu and Kashmir	35	https://www.iimj.ac.in	(Note: Indian Institute of Management Jammu started operations in November 2016.)
	1963 (converted to IIM in 2023)	IIM Mumbai	IIM-M	Mumbai	Maharashtra	6	http://www.iimmumbai.ac.in	(Note: Previously the National Institute of Industrial Engineering; became an IIM in 2023)
	2025	IIM Guwahati	IIM-G	Guwahati	Assam		www.iimg.ac.in	

== History ==
After India became independent in 1947, the Planning Commission was entrusted to oversee and direct the development of the nation. India grew rapidly in the 1950s, and in the late 1950s the Commission started facing difficulties in finding suitable managers for the large number of public sector enterprises that were being established in India as a part of its industrial policy. To solve this problem, the Planning Commission in 1959 invited Professor George Robbins of UCLA to help in setting up an All India Institute of Management Studies. Based on his recommendations, the Indian government decided to set up two elite management institutes, named Indian Institutes of Management. Calcutta and Ahmedabad were chosen as the locations for the two new institutes.

The institute at Calcutta was established first, on 13 November 1961, and was named Indian Institute of Management Calcutta or IIM Calcutta. It was set up in collaboration with the MIT Sloan School of Management, the government of West Bengal, the Ford Foundation, and Indian industry. The institute at Ahmedabad was established in the following month and was named the Indian Institute of Management Ahmedabad. Like MIT Sloan in the case of IIM Calcutta, Harvard Business School played an important role in the initial stages of IIM Ahmedabad.

In 1972, a committee headed by Ravi J. Matthai took note of the success of the two established IIMs and recommended the setting up of two more IIMs. Based on the committee's recommendation, a new IIM, originally intended to cater exclusively to the needs of public sector enterprises, was established in Bangalore (IIM Bangalore) the next year. In 1981, the first IIM Review Committee was convened to examine the progress of the three existing IIMs and to make recommendations. The committee noted that the three IIMs were producing around 400 PGP graduates every year and that they had reached their optimum capacity. It proposed the opening of two more IIMs to meet the rising demand for management professionals. It also recommended expanding the Fellowship programmes, similar to PhD programmes, to meet the growing demand for faculty in management schools in India. The fourth IIM, IIM Lucknow, was established in 1984 based on the committee's recommendation.

Two more IIMs, the fifth and sixth, were established at Kozhikode and Indore in 1996. IIM Shillong was the seventh IIM to be established, following a 2005 decision by the Government of India; its foundation stone was laid on 1 December 2007; and its first academic session was 2008–09. Since 2007, fourteen new IIMs have been set up, bringing the total number of IIMs to 20, IIM-Jammu being the latest one, starting in 2016. In 2023, the prestigious National Institute of Industrial Engineering (NITIE), Mumbai, was converted into an IIM, making for a total of 21 IIMs. In 2025, the twenty-second IIM was established in Guwahati.

The Union Cabinet, on 24 January 2017, approved the bill that became the Indian Institutes of Management Act, 2017, which declares IIMs as Institutes of National Importance and enables them to grant degrees and to further make other important changes to the institute. The IIM bill was passed by the Lok Sabha on 28 July 2017 and by the Rajya Sabha on 19 December 2017. After receiving presidential assent, the IIM bill became an Act on 31 December 2017.

In the 2023 Union Budget grants to the IIMs were cut in half. Heads of IIMs and B-schools said this would effect the newer IIMs disproportionately.

== Academics ==
The IIMs mainly offer undergraduate/ postgraduate, postgraduate, doctoral, and executive education programs. Some programs offered by all IIMs are similar; however, some IIMs offer unique programs for specialized purposes.

=== Postgraduate Management Program ===
==== Two-year MBA (Post Graduate Program) ====
All IIMs offer a two-year full-time Post Graduate Program in Management (PGP), equivalent to a Master of Business Administration (MBA) degree. The program is considered the flagship program of IIMs, and awards the Master of Business Administration (MBA) to successful candidates. Since 2018, all the IIMs have started granting MBA degrees for this flagship program.

This program is usually structured into six trimesters spread across two years, starting in June and running until April of the second year. The first-year coursework generally consists of core courses in various management disciplines, while in the second year, students are allowed to select courses from an exhaustive list of electives. The PGP is a general, fully integrated management program with no specialization, and typically includes courses in:

  - accounting,
  - behavioral science,
  - finance,
  - economics,
  - human resource management (HRM),
  - management sciences and information technology,
  - marketing,
  - business operations,
  - business mathematics,
  - public policy,
  - statistics and decision analysis,
  - strategy, and
  - general management.

The 2-year MBA programs offered by IIMs at:

  - Bangalore,
  - Ahmedabad,
  - Calcutta,
  - Udaipur,
  - Lucknow and
  - Indore

are often termed as Master's in Management (MIM) internationally and are often placed around top 100 Master's in Management programs across the world since inception.

==== One-year full time MBA ====
To compete globally with international business schools, several Indian Institutes of Management (IIMs) introduced one-year, full-time postgraduate MBA programs for experienced professionals. Since 2006, institutions including IIM Ahmedabad, IIM Bangalore, IIM Calcutta, IIM Lucknow, IIM Indore, IIM Kozhikode, IIM Shillong, and IIM Udaipur have launched these degree options, which typically require approximately five years of prior work experience. Following their introduction, several of these programs gained placement on global MBA rankings.

The one-year program was necessitated because the normal 2-year program is primarily aimed at new graduates or graduates with less than 4–5 years of work experience. The 1-year programs are general, fully integrated management programs with no specialization, and typically include the same courses as offered in a typical 2-year MBA program. These intensive programs typically require 75 credits or around 750 hours of classroom teaching along with projects and other coursework as in a normal 2-year MBA program. The flagship 1-year MBA programs offered by IIMs at Bangalore, Ahmedabad and Calcutta are often termed as Global MBAs internationally and have been ranked within the top 50 Global MBA programs across the world since their inception.

Designed as a regular MBA program, which focuses on using the prior work experience of the students, the one-year Executive MBA is named differently by different IIMs. It is called Post Graduate Program for Executives at IIM Calcutta and IIM Shillong (PGPEX for short), and at IIM Ahmedabad and IIM Udaipur (PGPX for short). It is called an Executive Post Graduate Program (EPGP) at IIM Bangalore and IIM Indore, and International Program in Management for Executives (IPMX) at IIM Lucknow. All these programs admit only candidates with 5 or more years of professional experience and usually use a combination of GMAT score, essays, and personal interviews as entry criteria, similar to other globally reputed MBA programs. The median GMAT score of the batches at IIM Ahmedabad, Bangalore, Calcutta, Indore and IIM Udaipur is usually above 700 and compares with the best in the world.

==== Other specialty full time MBA programmes ====
Other than these general variants, many IIMs offer specialty programmes built which focus on different areas, e.g. Post Graduate Programme in Sustainable Management (PGP-SM) at IIM Lucknow, Post Graduate Programme in Human Resource Management (PGPHRM) at IIM Ranchi and many more.

=== Five-year Integrated Management Programme (Undergraduate/Postgraduate Education) ===
Five IIMs, IIM Indore and IIM Rohtak, IIM Jammu, IIM Bodh Gaya and IIM Ranchi also offer five-year integrated programs. Students join this program after high school (class XII). The program is called IPM (Integrated Programme in Management) at both institutes. The course structures are similar, though not the same at both institutes. For three years, students focus on "statistics, economics and humanities", joining the post-graduate cohort in years 4 and 5. IIM Indore established its program in 2011 and IIM Rohtak in 2019. They were followed by IIM Ranchi, IIM Jammu and IIM Bodhgaya in 2021. IIM Indore awards programs for both BA (Foundations of Management) and MBA. IIM Rohtak awards the BBA/MBA to five-year graduates and BBA to students who opt-out after three years.

=== Fellow Programme in Management (DBA) ===
IIMs offer a Fellow Programme in Management (FPM) as a full-time DBA Programme. This programme is aimed at preparing students for careers in teaching or research in different disciplines of management, as well as for careers outside academia that demand a high degree of investigative and analytical ability. A student who completes this programme at any IIM, where (s)he is registered as a doctoral scholar, is awarded the title of Fellow Member (e.g. Fellow Member of the Indian Institutes of Management). This Fellow Programme is equivalent to the DBA degree. Students receiving such a fellowship every year, across all IIMs, work in close association with one another in specific research areas of their choice.

=== Executive Management Programme ===
Many IIMs offer Executive MBA programmes targeted at working professionals. These are often short-term or part-time programmes and are known by various names such as Master of Management Studies (MMS), Management Development Programme (MDP), Advanced Masters Program in Management of Global Enterprises (AMPM), and Executive General Management Programme (EGMP). The certificate programmes at IIMs are not considered equivalent to an Executive MBA offered by the IIMs. Only the diploma-level programmes are considered equivalent, depending on whether it is full-time or part-time. Many IIMs—such as IIM Indore, IIMC, IIMB, IIMK, IIM Kashipur, and IIM Rohtak—have partnered with third-party companies to enable these courses to be provided under a distributed model.

=== Other programmes ===
Some IIMs offer specialised programmes targeted at various management segments. IIM Ahmedabad offers a six-month, full-time programme called the Armed Forces Programme (AFP) aimed at military personnel. IIM Ahmedabad and IIM Bangalore offer full-time programmes in public administration and public policy called the Post Graduate Programme in Public Management and Policy (PGP-PMP) and Post Graduate Programme in Public Policy Management (PGPPM), respectively, for civil servants of the Indian Administrative Service cadre. IIM Bangalore offers a two-year, part-time programme called the Post-Graduate Programme in Software Enterprise Management (PGPSEM), an executive general-management education programme designed for the specific needs of professionals working in the software and information technology industry. IIM Indore offers a 5-year Integrated Programme in Management (IPM) that leads to a combined undergraduate-cum-graduate diploma. IIM Ranchi is the first and only IIM to offer a full-time Post Graduate Diploma in Human Resource Management (PGDHRM) programme. IIM Bangalore offers a two-year Mahatma Gandhi National Fellowship to "promote skill development in district economies".

== Admission process ==
Different programmes of IIMs follow different admission processes. Admission for residents of India to the two-year PGP programmes at all IIMs is based on the Common Admission Test (CAT). CAT scores are often used as the primary short-listing criteria for admissions. International/overseas applicants have the option to apply using GMAT scores instead of CAT scores. GMAT scores are a prerequisite short-listing criteria used for admission to the one-year full-time programme for experienced executives. Test requirements for doctoral programmes vary. Some IIMs require candidates to make a presentation of a broad research idea or take a Research Aptitude Test (RAT) followed by a round of interviews while all are compelled to accept scores on standardised tests such as the CAT, GATE, GMAT, and GRE. The overall profiles of candidates, including past academic and professional accomplishments, are considered for all programmes, along with valid standard test scores. Some programmes require essays and academic or professional recommendations. The final round of admission evaluations involves an interview, before which some IIMs conduct other evaluation processes like written assessment tests and group discussions.

=== Entrance exam ===
The Common Admission Test (CAT) is a management aptitude test conducted by the IIMs primarily as an evaluation tool for admission to their two-year PGP programmes. It is widely considered one of the most competitive exams in the world, with a success rate of around one in two hundred. Even with the recent addition of new colleges, in 2013 the acceptance rate at IIMs was 1.714%, one of the lowest in the world.

Originally conducted as a paper-and-pencil test given on a particular date all over India, in 2009 CAT began being given as a computer-based assessment operated by Prometric. In 2014, TCS received a 5-year contract to conduct the test. The online test is now given over a period of a few weeks.

In August 2011, the six newer IIMs (Raipur, Rohtak, Ranchi, Udaipur, Trichy and Kashipur) announced that in the coming year they will replace the group-discussion round with a common written analysis test to evaluate communication and comprehension skills. The seven older IIMs did not announce plans to change the admission process.

The admissions for the two-year full-time programme are done by shortlisting based on CAT scores in conjunction with candidate profile suitability. This is followed by evaluation of essays and a panel-interview round. The quality of prior work experience and future leadership potential is a critical factor in the selection.

=== Reservation policy ===
IIMs also follow a quota system, as per the provisions of the Indian constitution. As per the provisions, 15% of the seats are reserved for students of Scheduled Castes, and 7.5% for Scheduled Tribes. Since 2008, the Other Backward Classes have also been given 27% reservation and Economically Weaker Sections (EWS) have up to 10% reservation, after the Supreme Court of India upheld the validity of the relevant government regulation. The provisions are being implemented in a phased manner due to resource constraints. All aspirants have to take the Common Admission Test, which consists of an objective-type exam, a group-discussion round, and personal interviews, with the cut-off for reserved-category candidates being possibly lower than for general-category candidates. Once admitted to a programme, a reserved category student has to meet all the criteria for completing the programme as a general-category student. Regular counselling sessions, extra classes, and tutorials by senior students for needy students are a regular feature of the IIMs. IIMs provide financial support to needy and deserving students in the form of scholarships.

== Courses and Fees ==
=== Post-graduate program fees ===
In 2004, IIM fees were adjusted by the HRE to ₹30,000 (equivalent to ₹120,000 or US$1,200 in 2026) annually.

However, as of 2023, the total fees for the 2-year program ranged from ₹20 lakh (equivalent to ₹22 lakh or US$23,000 in 2026) to ₹30 lakh (equivalent to ₹33 lakh or US$35,000 in 2026). Inflation in India has been cited as one of the reasons for the fee hikes at IIMs.

The fees of the college are influenced by the age and performance of the institute. For example, IIM C, the oldest IIM in the country, had a total course fee of ₹27 lakh (equivalent to ₹29 lakh or US$31,000 in 2026) for the academic year 2022-24. While IIM Jammu, the youngest IIM, had a total course fee of ₹17.15 lakh (equivalent to ₹19 lakh or US$20,000 in 2026).

=== Executive program fees ===
The IIMs also have several executive programs for working executives and professionals. The full-time executive program at IIM Udaipur launched in 2019 had a fees of ₹15.8 lakh (US$17,000) while the data analytics program was ₹21 lakh (US$22,000). The same year IIM Lucknow's 6-month data analytics program costs ₹2.49 lakh (US$2,700) while its analytics program for finance professionals costed ₹1.43 lakh (US$1,500).

=== Profit Margin of the IIMs ===
The following data pertains to the older six IIMs (Ahmedabad, Bengaluru, Kolkatta, Lucknow, Indore, Kozhikode):

Profit Margin of older six IIMs
2021-22 (in lakh Indian rupee)	IIM Ahmedabad	IIM Bengaluru	IIM Kolkatta	IIM Lucknow	IIM Indore	IIM Kozhikode
Revenue	30,217	26,194	22,442	20,007	22,151	25,056
Academic Receipts	25,875	22,899	14,209	17,698	17,442	24,275
"Academic Receipts" as % of Total Revenue	86	87	63	88	79	97
Profit ("Excess of Income over Expenditure")	4,725	8,241	5,564	7,281	8,061	9,354
Profit Margin	15.6%	31.5%	24.8%	36.4%	36.4%	37.3%
Total Number of PG Students for the year	874	1,057	1,069	1,129	1,145	1,172
Income per student, if 'Profit' is distributed among PG students	5.4	7.8	5.2	6.5	7.0	8.0

As IIMs are considered not-for-profit institutions, they do not pay any 'corporate tax' to the Income Tax Department, Government of India. In 2023, the corporate tax in India was approximately 25% in the 2020s.

In 2023, the fees charged by the older six IIMs (ABCLIK) were in the range of approximately 21 - 26 lakhs for the two-year full-time PG programme/ MBA. The fee charged by these IIMs was 22-26 times India's annual per capita income (Rs. 96,522 in 2022-23, at constant prices). Globally, this places IIMs amongst any of the institutions that charge the highest fee from its citizens, with reference to the annual per capita income of the nation.

In 2016, a constitutional bench of the Supreme Court of India mentioned that “Education is... ...a noble ‘occupation’... those who establish and are managing the educational institutions are not expected to indulge in profiteering or commercialise this noble activity.” The Supreme Court also mentioned that “... the occupation of education cannot be treated at par with other economic activities.”.

== See also ==
- Indian Ethos in Management
- Indian Institutes of Technology
- National Institutes of Technology
