= Indian ethos in management =

Indian Ethos in Management refers to the values and practices that the culture of India (Bharatheeya Sanskriti) can contribute to service, leadership and management. These values and practices are rooted in Sanathana Dharma (the eternal essence), and have been influenced by various strands of Indian philosophy.

== Work values from Bharatheeya Sanskriti ==
1. Paropakaaraartham Idam Shareeram - The body is meant for serving others or for the higher common good.

2. Atmanomokshartham Jagat Hitayacha - Endeavors should be made considering the well-being of the world too, while considering the (spiritual) well-being of oneself.

3. Trikaranasuddhi - To consider work as a means to grow oneself in 'Purity and Unity of Thought, Word and Deed'.

4. Yagnaya charatha: karma - To engage in work as a sacred offering

== Influences ==
Attempts have been made to distill aspects related to management theory and practice from various texts of India. A variety of works has influenced this area and few of them include Autobiography of a Yogi, Thirukkural, Mahabharatha, Ramayana and Bhagavad Gita.

== Examples of practice ==
E. Sreedharan is one of the leaders who attributes his excellence in professional world to Bhagwad Gita and its principles. A number of examples indicating the practice has been documented.

== Popularisation ==
Academicians and practitioners such as Prof S K Chakraborty, Jack Hawley, Debra and William Miller, Devdutt Pattanaik, Prof Subhash Sharma, Prof Sharda Nandram, Prof. Dharm Bhawuk, Ankur Joshi etc. There are even research based videos on application Indian ethos in era of artificial intelligence. have contributed to the evolution and popularisation of this domain. Stephen Covey has detailed the application of Gandhian values in leadership, through his book Principle Centered Leadership. Faculty of Management Studies, Banasthali Vidyapith has been teaching Indian Ethos in Management since 1996. Recently IIM Ahmedabad made a foray into the domain by introducing lessons from Panchtantra stories for management. The AICTE in its model curriculum for MBA has stressed on need for Indian ethos in the MBA education.

== Prevalence ==
This theme is embedded in varying levels as part of programmes in business management offered by various business schools and universities.

- FMS-WISDOM at Banasthali Vidyapith under the National Resource Center setup by Ministry of Education (India) Government of India, developed video based modules with focus on Indian ethos for management teachers.
- IIM Calcutta has a centre for human values to foster research and academic activities in the domain of Indian ethos.
- IIM Indore organised a conference on Indian Management in December 2017.
- IBA Banglore linked cultural symbols to the idea of Indian ethos.
