= Business Today (India) =

News magazine (1992-)

- Editor: Siddharth Zarabi
- Categories: Business magazine
- Frequency: Fortnightly
- Circulation: 338,000 (2Q, 2010)
- Publisher: Living Media
- Founded: 1992
- Country: India
- Language: English
- Website: www.businesstoday.in

Business Today is an Indian fortnightly business magazine published by Living Media India Limited, in publication since 1992.

== Circulation ==
Business Today has the highest circulation and readership amongst business magazines, and is among the top 10 English-language magazines across genres. It is published once a fortnight, and commands a readership base of 1.7 million readers.

== Events ==
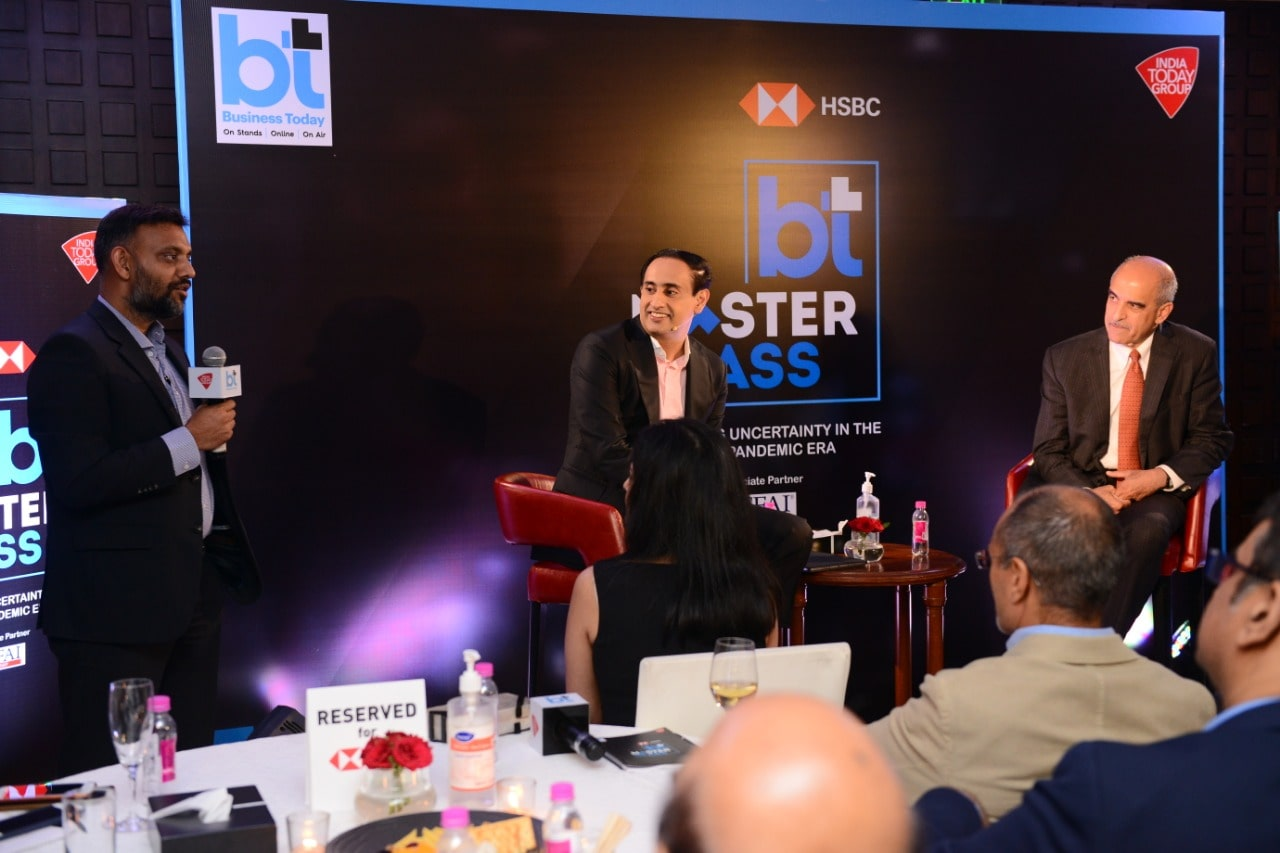
Rahul Kanwal hosting a Business Today event

Business Today events is a group of programmes that includes the signature BT MindRush and BT Best CEO Awards. BT does events such as India@100 Economy Summit.

== Leadership ==
In May 2021, India Today Group elevated Rahul Kanwal to the role of executive director of Business Today.
