= Indian Institute of Management Tiruchirappalli =

Public graduate business school

- Motto: ज्ञानम् अनंतम्
- Motto in English: Knowledge is endless
- Type: Public business school
- Established: January 4, 2011; 15 years ago
- Accreditation: AMBA
- Chairman: Jalaj Dani
- Director: Pawan Kumar Singh
- Location: Tiruchirappalli, Tamil Nadu, India; 10°39′49″N 78°44′41″E
- Campus: Suburban
- Website: www.iimtrichy.ac.in

The Indian Institute of Management - Tiruchirappalli (IIM-Trichy or IIM-T) is an autonomous public business school located in Tiruchirappalli, Tamilnadu in India. The eleventh IIM was instituted on 4 January 2011. It has been ranked 16th among management schools by NIRF. It operates from its campus spread over 175 acres of land, about 11 km from Tiruchirappalli International Airport. It also has a satellite campus in Chennai for executive education. It offers full-time, executive, and doctoral programs in business management.

== Campus ==
The campus of the Indian Institute of Management, Tiruchirappalli, is located on 172.27 acres (69.72 ha) land on the Tiruchirappalli-Pudukkottai highway. The ₹584 crore (US$61 million) campus consists of student hostels, faculty residences, a library, recreational facilities, and Executive Residences.

IIM Tiruchirappalli set up a satellite campus at Chennai in the year 2012. It offers a two-year postgraduate programme for working professionals from this campus.

== Academics ==
=== Academic programs ===
IIM Trichy offers a two-year full-time residential Post Graduate Programme in Management (PGPM), a two-year Post Graduate Programme in Business Management (PGPBM) for working executives at the Chennai campus, and a Fellow Programme in Management (FPM) for Doctor of Business Administration candidates. In the year 2020, IIM Trichy launched a Postgraduate Programme in Human Resources Management (PGPM-HR) at its Trichy campus.

=== Admission Process ===
The admission for the two-year full-time residential Postgraduate Programme in Management (PGP) and Postgraduate Programme in Human Resources Management (PGPM-HR) is through the Common Admission Test (CAT) scores followed by the Common Admission Process (CAP), where the 10 new and baby IIMs take part. The CAP consists of a written-ability test (WAT) followed by an interview. Based on the past academic performances, work experience, CAT scores, and CAP scores, students are offered admission into these programs. The total intake for the following batch, 2021-23, was 230 students for PGPM and 30 for PGPM-HR.

=== Rankings ===
Institute rankings

Business/Management – India
- Government colleges
- Outlook India (2022): 7

IIM Tiruchirappalli was ranked 16 in National Institutional Ranking Framework (NIRF) management school ranking of 2025.

== Student life ==
=== Cultural events ===
IIMT hosts several yearly events. Dhruva is a cultural and management fest held in the second half of the month of October. E-Summit is an entrepreneurial summit held in the month of November. HR Conclave is an industry-academia interaction event focused on Human Resources. Other events include Sanskriti - an annual war of sections, Sangram - an inter-IIM sports meet, and Kurukshetra - an inter-section sports tournament.
