= Common Admission Test =

Computer based test held in India

- Acronym: CAT
- Type: Computer-based standardized test
- Administrator: Indian Institutes of Management
- Skills tested: Quantitative Aptitude, Data Interpretation and Logical Reasoning, Verbal Ability and Reading Comprehension
- Purpose: Admission to post-graduate management programs
- Year started: January 1977
- Duration: 2 hours(40 minutes for each section) PWD candidates get 160 minutes (53 minutes and 20 seconds for each section)
- Score range: varies annually
- Score validity: 1 year
- Offered: Once a year (usually on the last Sunday of November).
- Restrictions on attempts: No restriction
- Regions: 170 cities and towns all over India.
- Languages: English
- Annual number of test takers: ▼2.58 Lakhs (CAT 2025)
- Prerequisites: Bachelor's degree (or equivalent) with at least 50 % marks or equivalent GPA (45 % in case of SC, ST, PWD candidates). Final year undergraduate students are also eligible
- Fee: ₹2,600 (US$28) for General/ EWS/NC-OBC category candidates. ₹1,300 (US$14) for SC/ST/PWD category candidates
- Used by: Various business schools in India
- Website: iimcat.ac.in

The Common Admission Test (CAT) is a computer based test for admission in graduate management programs. The test consists of three sections: Verbal Ability and Reading Comprehension, Data Interpretation and Logical Reasoning, and Quantitative Ability. The exam was taken online over a period of three hours, with one hour per section. In 2020, due to the COVID-19 precautions, Indian Institute of Management Indore decided to conduct the CAT Exam in 2 hours with 40 minutes devoted to each section. The Indian Institutes of Management started this exam and use the test for selecting students for their business administration programs (MBA or PGDM). The test is conducted every year by one of the Indian Institutes of Managements (IIMs) based on a policy of rotation.

In August 2011, it was announced that Indian Institutes of Technology (IITs) and Indian Institute of Science (IISc) would also use the CAT scores, instead of the Joint Management Entrance Test (JMET), to select students for their management programmes starting with the 2012–15 batch.

Before 2010, CAT was a paper based test conducted on a single day for all candidates. The pattern, number of questions and duration have seen considerable variations over the years.

On 1 May 2009, it was announced that CAT would be a computer-based test starting from 2009. The American firm Prometric was entrusted with the responsibility of conducting it from 2009 to 2013. The first computer based CAT was marred with technical snags. The issue was so serious that it prompted the Government of India to seek a report from the convenor. The trouble was diagnosed as 'Conficker' and 'W32 Nimda', the two viruses that attacked the system display of the test, causing server slow down. Since 2014 onward, CAT has been conducted by Tata Consultancy Services (TCS). CAT 2015 and CAT 2016 were 180-minute tests consisting of 100 questions (34 from Quantitative Ability, 34 from Verbal Ability and Reading Comprehension, and 32 from Data Interpretation and Logical Reasoning. CAT 2020 onwards, the exam duration has been reduced to two hours, with 40 minutes allotted per section.

== Eligibility for CAT ==
The candidate must satisfy the below specified criteria:

1. Hold a bachelor's degree, with not less than 50% or equal CGPA (45% for Scheduled Caste (SC), Scheduled Tribe (ST) and Persons with Disability (PWD)/Differently Able (DA) classification)
2. The degree should be granted by any of the universities consolidated by an act of the central or state statutory body in India or other instructive organizations built up by an act of Parliament or pronounced to be considered as a university under Section 3 of the UGC Act, 1956, or possess an equivalent qualification recognized by the Ministry of HRD, Government of India.
3. Competitors appearing for the final year of bachelor's degree/equivalent qualification examination and the individuals who have finished degree prerequisites and are anticipating results can likewise apply. If selected, such applicants will be permitted to join the program temporarily, only if they present a certificate most recent by June of next year in which the exam is held, from the principal/registrar of their college/institute (issued at the latest 30 June of that year) expressing that the competitor has finished every one of the prerequisites for acquiring four-year or three-year college education/identical capability on the date of the issue of the certificate.

== Exam pattern ==
The Common Admission Test (CAT) uses different versions of the exam each year, so it reports two types of scores: a raw score and a scaled score.

The raw score is calculated for each section based on the number of questions one answered correctly, incorrectly, or left attempted. Candidates are given +3 points for each correct answer and -1 point for each incorrect answer, with no negative marking for TITA (Type in the Answer) questions.

Since different versions of the test may vary slightly in difficulty, the raw scores are adjusted using a method called equating. After that, the scores are scaled to ensure fairness, so that scores from different exam slots can be compared accurately.

The number of questions in CAT can change from year to year. Recently, the paper has had 68 questions divided into three sections:

- Verbal Ability and Reading Comprehension (VARC) – 24 questions
- Data Interpretation and Logical Reasoning (DILR) – 22 questions
- Quantitative Ability (QA) – 22 questions

CAT is held in three sessions in a single day: Morning, Afternoon, and Evening. Candidate can give exam in only one of the session.

=== CAT Pattern and Duration ===
The CAT 2024 exam was conducted in three sessions, each of 40 minutes, for a total exam duration of 120 minutes (2 hours). The CAT exam pattern includes both Multiple Choice Question and non-MCQ or TITA (Type-In-The-Answer) questions. The test comprises the following three sections:

1. Verbal Ability & Reading Comprehension (VARC)
  - 24 questions in total: 8 Verbal Ability questions and 4 Reading Comprehension passages, each containing 4 questions.
2. Data Interpretation & Logical Reasoning (DILR)
  - 22 questions are asked across 5 sets, 2 sets having 5 questions each and 3 sets having 4 questions each.
3. Quantitative Ability (QA)
  - 22 questions covering topics such as Arithmetic, Algebra, Geometry, Number System, and Modern Math.

In total, the CAT 2025 exam consists of 68 questions, with a maximum score of 204 marks.

Candidates can not switch between sections while answering; the order of sections is fixed as: VARC → DILR → QA.

== Controversy ==
In 2003, the CAT exam got leaked, leading to a re-examination.

In CAT 2024, a question of slot 2 in VARC was challenged by students and educators, but IIM C did not accept any changes. One candidate took the matter to court; however, the challenge was still not accepted.

In CAT 2025, IIM K released provisional answer keys without releasing provisional answers for QA (TITA) questions.

== CAT registrations in numbers over the years ==
The number of CAT registration increased around 93% since 2005. The number of registrations in the past years are shown in the following chart:

Year	No. of candidates Registered	No. of candidates Appeared
2005	170,000	155,000
2006	191,000	180,000
2007	250,000	230,000
2008	290,000	276,000
2009	241,000	230,000
2010	204,000	185,000
2011	205,000	186,000
2012	214,000	195,000
2013	194,516	173,714
2014	196,988	170,000
2015	218,664	179,602
2016	232,434	195,679
2017	231,067	199,632
2018	240,338	209,405
2019	244,169	209,926
2020	227,835	190,144
2021	229,969	191,660
2022	255,501	222,184
2023	328,000	288,000
2024	329,000	293,000
2025	295,000	258,000
2026	284,000	

Note: Data of candidates registered till 2012 are approximate.

== See also ==
- Graduate Management Admission Test
- Graduate Record Examination
- Test of English as a Foreign Language
