= Education in Odisha =

Previously a neglected aspect of the Indian Central government, Education in Odisha is witnessing a rapid transformation. Its capital city, Bhubaneswar along with Cuttack, are emerging as a knowledge hub in India with several new public and private universities, including the establishment of an Indian Institute of Technology after five decades of demand.

Odisha has fared reasonably well in terms of literacy rates. The overall literacy rate according to Census 2011 is 73.5%, which is marginally behind of the national average of 74.04%. In Odisha there are also many schools and colleges, maintained by government.

== History ==
=== Ancient and medieval era ===
Historically, Odisha has been at the forefront of education and research. The ruins of a major ancient university, Puspagiri, were recently discovered in Odisha. Scholars from far away lands, such as Greece, Persia and China used to study philosophy, astronomy, mathematics and science at this famed university. Along with Takshashila and Nalanda universities, Puspagiri was among the oldest universities in the world. All three universities were mentioned by the Chinese traveler Huien Tsang (Xuanzang), who visited India in the 7th century, but unlike the others, the whereabouts of Puspagiri university were unknown until recently. As of 2007, the ruins of this university have not been fully excavated yet. Odisha's education prospered under Hindu and Buddhist rule. However, it went into a period of decline under the Sun dynasty, after 1568. The Muslims and the Marathas, who occupied Odisha before the British, did little to spread education. Before the creation of modern Odisha, the mainstay of the education system were the Sanskrit Pathsalas, and the Maktabs, which existed in Cuttack, Balasore, Puri, Angul and Sambalpur, local Chatasalis to cater to grassroot level education, as well as advanced centres of Oriental learning.

=== Colonial era ===
The colonialization of Odisha by the British East India Company in 1803 proved disastrous to Odisha in all spheres. It led to the collapse of the traditional education system. Yet, Odisha being one of the last Indian territories to come under the British rule became exposed much later than other parts of India to the system of education they introduced. Under the East India Company, Christian missionaries who took up printing the Old and New Testaments in Odia, also contributed to some growth in education. The first primary school was created in 1822 by missionaries.

The Cuttack Zilla school, Odisha's first modern school up to matriculation level, was established in 1866. It was extended to become a Collegiate school in 1868, which provided first and second year college education to Odia students. However, Odias were severely disadvantaged by having to attend Presidency College in Kolkata for B.A. degrees. This was until the collegiate branch of Zilla school was converted into a full bachelor's degree granting college under the then commissioner, T. E. Ravenshaw. This college was named as Ravenshaw College after him.

In the early 20th Century, Gopabandhu Das established the 1st nationalist school in Odisha, the Satyabadi Bana Bidyalaya, following which Sayeed Mohammed established the second nationalist school of Odisha at Cuttack named the Muslim Seminary (present day: Sayeed Seminary). These nationalist schools aimed to cultivate the ideals of patriotism in the hearts of the students.

Women's education was taken up with the establishment of the Ravenshaw Hindu Girls' School in 1873. The Maharajah of Keonjhar, the Rani of Talcher, amongst other notable Odia personalities, who made contributions. Later, Reba Ray, a former student of this school, Begum Badar un nissa Akhtar and Sailabala Das became instrumental in furthering the cause of women's education, leading to the creation of the Sailabala Women's College, Cuttack which was founded by Sailabala Das in the year 1913.

Medical education began with the opening of the first medical school in 1876, by Dr. Stewart, the Civil Surgeon of Cuttack, who also translated the Materia Medica into Odia. The first industrial school was opened in 1884, in Alalpur, Balasore. A survey school began at the same time in Cuttack, which later on became the Orissa School of Engineering, marking the beginnings of technical education in the state.

== School education ==
=== Literacy ===
Although 10 years of primary education is mandatory in Odisha, the literacy rate is only 73.5%, which is marginally behind of the national average of 74.04%. The government of India has undertaken steps to improve women's literacy in the tribal pockets in the state and elsewhere in India. But the Cuttack district, including Kendrapara-Jagatsinghpur, are continuing as the most educated districts of Orissa since independence till date.

Non-formal and adult literacy programs are run in various districts and are at different stages of implementation. Out of 30 districts, 9 are continuing total literacy campaign [TLC]. 10 districts are either continuing or awaiting approval of post literacy program [PLP]. 11 districts have completed PLP, and some of them have received sanction for Continuing Education Program. The State Government is committed to the Universalisation of Elementary Education in the State with the aim of fulfilling the constitutional obligation with the assistance of Central Government.

=== Odisha Adarsha Vidyalayas ===
One of the major innovation in recent years has been plans of Odisha State to set up one Odisha Adarsha Vidyalaya (literally Odisha Model School) at each of 314 block headquarters. 100 Odisha Adarsha Vidyalayas has already started functioning from academic session 2016–17. These Adarsha Vidyalayas would be Central Board of Secondary Education affiliated fully residential schools, provide free of education, and target talented students through an annual entrance examination. These would have Class VI through Class XII and each class would have 80 number of students.

== Universalisation of elementary education ==
Keeping in view the need for Universalisation of elementary education, there has been expansion at Primary and Upper Primary School stage of education, in the Government sector, especially in rural areas as well as backward areas.

=== Status of elementary education in the state ===
In Odisha there are 35,928 Primary and 20,427 Upper Primary schools to provide education at elementary level. More 491 New Primary and 490 New Upper Primary schools opened under S.S.A. to provide schooling in unserved areas.

- 66 lakh children of 6–14 years age group are in-school, out of which 12 lakh are SC and 17 lakh are ST.
- 1.87 lakh children of 6–14 years age group are out-of-school from which 0.3 lakh are from SC and 0.9 lakh are from ST community. Out of them 56,995 Children were admitted to regular existing & New Schools under Enrolment Drive in districts.

Further to improve access to Elementary Education and to achieve 100% enrolment, Government have relaxed the norm for opening of new Primary schools

- In K.B.K. districts and Tribal Sub Plan areas new primary schools will be opened in habitations having at least 25 children in the 6–14 years age group provided there is no primary school within one KM of such habitations.
- In all the districts the distance norm for opening of new primary and new upper primary schools is relaxed in case of natural barrier like river, hilly terrain, dense forest etc.
- There are 218 Minority and Mission Managed Primary Schools, wherein 599 teachers are receiving grant-in-aid from the government. Besides, Odia Medium Schools.
- Odisha_Adarsha_Vidyalaya Sangathan]

== Universalisation of Secondary Education ==
=== Secondary Education ===
There are 6193 Govt. and aided Secondary Schools, 849 Recognized High Schools and 151 permitted High Schools in the State.

- As per the GIA Rules, 2004, 1981 private High Schools have been notified to receive block grant.
- 1375 nos. of Contract Teachers has been engaged against the 3210 posts advertised.
- Contract teachers of High Schools have been allowed the minimum basic pay of their respective regular scale in Revised Scale of Pay 2008.
- Government have approved 799 candidates as non-teaching staff under the Rehabilitation Assistance Scheme in the year 2010.
- Computer Literacy is being popularized in High Schools. Board of Secondary Education has included computer learning as an optional subject in the curriculum for Secondary schools.

=== Rastriya Madhyamik Shiksha Abhiyan (RMSA) ===
RMSA is a national flagship programme initiated in 2009–10 to universalise Secondary Education by making good quality education available, accessible and affordable to all children within the age group of 14 – 18 years with strong focus on the elements of gender, equity & justice.

==== Objectives ====
- To provide secondary school within 5 km and higher secondary school within 7–10 km of every habitation.
- Gross Enrolment Ratio (GER) of 75% for class-IX & X within five years (by 2013–14).
- Universal Access to Secondary Education (SE) by 2017.
- Universal Retention by 2020.
- Access to Secondary Education (SE) for all disadvantaged group of children.
- To improve quality of education resulting in enhanced intellectual, social and cultural learning.

==== Action Taken ====
- Annual Work Plan for 2010–11 and Perspective Plan for 5 years submitted to GOI.
- PAB approved for 2009–10 Rs.207.18 crores and for 2010–11 Rs. 507.92 crore.
- Rs. 3.00 crores released by GOI for "Preparatory Activities" such as Strengthening State and District offices.
- Strengthening manpower organising training/workshop/SEMI Setc.
- Rs. 71.40 crores released by GOI for "Project Activities" such as; Civil works for new school.
- M.M.E.R. (Management Monitoring Evaluation & Research which is being released to all the 30 districts.
- Data collection, data entry and analysis of "Secondary Education Management Information System" (S.E.M.I.S.), 2009–10 is completed & is under verification by the Inspector of Schools.

=== The 10+2 structure ===
In Odisha, as elsewhere in India, children are enrolled in school at the age of five. The core subjects taught in schools include Science (including Physics, Chemistry and Biology), Mathematics (Arithmetic, Algebra, Geometry, Trigonometry, Computer Science, and Set theory), Social Studies (Geography, History, Civics and Economics), and three languages, which are usually Odia, Hindi and English. Additionally, school children receive training in sports and physical education, as well as vocational training.

After ten years of schooling, children at the end of class X must appear in one of the three school examinations; 1. All India Secondary School Examination, which is conducted by the Central Government run Central Board of Secondary Education, 2. Odisha High School Certificate Examination, which is conducted by the Board of Secondary Education, Odisha and 3. Indian Certificate of Secondary Education examination, conducted annually by the New Delhi-based Council for the Indian School Certificate Examinations.

Children who appear in either the All India Secondary School Examination or the Odisha High School Certificate Examination have a choice of using Odia or English as the medium language. However, the Council for the Indian School Certificate Examinations makes English the mandatory language.

Two years of higher secondary education follow, which is optional. Students, usually in the 15 through 17 age group, have a choice of specializing in the following streams;

1. Arts
2. Science
3. Commerce

At this stage, the students get exposed to a wide array of elective subjects. The Central Board of Secondary Education conducts the All India Senior School Certificate Examination and the Council for the Indian School Certificate Examinations conducts the Indian School Certificate Examinations for students in class XII. There are also Junior colleges and Degree colleges in the state that offer secondary education for class XII children. The Council of Higher Secondary Education, Odisha conducts the higher secondary level examination for them.

This educational structure in Odisha is referred to commonly as the 10+2 system. Students who undergo the 10+2 education system are eligible for admission into a college or university in Odisha, and can also opt for other professional training. However, admission into the few top institutions in Odisha, particularly in engineering and medicine, are highly competitive. Students graduating from class XII typically must qualify in an entrance examination in order to gain admission.

=== Odisha Joint Entrance Examination ===
The Government of Odisha conducts a highly competitive Joint Entrance Examination annually to select students for admission into the various engineering colleges operating under Biju Patnaik University of Technology. In 2010, around 73,587 students took the exam against 76,000 students last year. Out of them 51,174 students sat for engineering, 19,663, in MBA, 9,446, in MCA.

== National level public institutions ==
Odisha has become a hub for higher education and has numerous institutions which are nationally and internationally recognised.

=== General ===
==== Central University of Odisha ====
The Central University of Odisha has been established in Koraput by the Parliament under the Central Universities Act, 2009 (No. 3C of 2009). It is one of the 15 new Central Universities established by the Government of India during the UGC XI Plan period to address the concerns of “equity and access” and as per the policy of the Government of India to increase the access to quality higher education by people in less educationally developed districts which have a Graduate Enrollment Ratio of less than the national average of 11%.

==== Indian Institute of Mass Communication ====
IIMC Dhenkanal, was set up in August 1993 as the first branch of IIMC New Delhi, under the Ministry of Information and Broadcasting, Govt. of India. It imparts education and training in journalism and also undertakes media studies and research. The institute conducts PG Diploma courses in Journalism in English and Odia, besides short term courses and workshops.

==== National University ====
A national university for research is being set up in Bhubaneswar. The government of India will seek expertize from leading universities, such as Yale, MIT and Princeton, in setting up the national university at Bhubaneswar.

==== Rashtriya Sanskrit Sansthan (Deemed University), Shri Sadashiva Campus ====
This campus was established in 1971 and is situated at Puri in Odisha. The institution is more than 100 years old. The campus is pursuing research work leading to the degree of Vidyavaridhi (PhD) and imparting education in Sahitya, Dharma Shastra, Navya Vyakarana, Puranetihas, Jyotish, Advaita Vedanta, Navya Nyaya, Sarvadarshana and Sankhya Yoga at post–graduate and graduate level and Shiksha Shastri at graduate level.

==== Regional Institute of Education ====
A premier centre of education research, the Regional Institute of Education is located near Acharya Vihar in Bhubaneswar. It is a regional centre of NCERT serving the eastern region. Apart from running training programmes for teachers of schools and colleges, the institute also has integrated courses of B.Sc. and B.Ed. The institute also runs courses on B.Ed., M.Ed. and M.Phil. (education).

=== Law ===
==== National Law University of Odisha ====
A national law university was established in 2009 at Naraj, in the outskirts of the city of Cuttack. The university offers integrated B.A. LL.B. and B.B.A. LL.B., integrated LL.M-PH.D and Ph.D. courses.

=== Management ===
==== Indian Institute of Management ====
The Indian Institute of Management, Sambalpur is the 14th Indian Institute of Management established by the MHRD, Government of India in 2015. A total of 237 acres (0.96 km^{2}) of land has been allocated at Basantpur towards the state of art permanent campus The institute has started Post Graduation Program (PGP) in Management since 2015.

==== Indian Institute of Tourism and Travel Management ====
Indian Institute of Tourism and Travel Management (IITTM), Bhubaneswar is one of the five premier autonomous institutes set by Ministry of Tourism, Government of India. IITTM is engaged in teaching, training, research and consultancy and is the only institute in the country dedicated to the tourism learning. The institute at Bhubaneswar was in 1996 as Baji Rout Regional Centre for Eastern India with the primary objective of expanding its activities to a part of the country that is full of tourism potential. It offers two years postgraduate diploma in management specializing in Tourism and Travel and International Business.

=== Medical ===
==== All India Institute of Medical Sciences, Bhubaneswar ====
All India Institute of Medical Sciences, Bhubaneswar (AIIMS) is being set up in the state under the Pradhan Mantri Swasthya Suraksha Yojna. Former Prime Minister Atal Bihari Vajpayee had laid the foundation stone for the super-speciality hospital in 2003. The state AIIMS was then estimated to cost about Rs 820.49 crore. The institute has initiated the process of recruiting staff and is buying equipment simultaneously and the facility would be ready to take admissions in undergraduate medical courses by 2013. Work on the medical college and the hospital buildings would be complete by September 2012. The Union government recently selected three top medical institutes to mentor the six upcoming AIIMS prototypes. AIIMS New Delhi will mentor its clone in Bhubaneswar. The mentor will guide the upcoming institute in selecting faculty and setting up necessary infrastructure.

==== Institute of Dental Sciences ====
Institute of Dental Sciences, Bhubaneswar was set up in 2005 on the recommendation of Dental Council of India, Health and Family Welfare Department, Govt. of India. It has been conducting B.D.S Course from the academic session 2006–07.

==== Institute of Life Sciences ====
The Institute of Life Sciences (ILS), an autonomous institute has been brought under the fold of the Department of Biotechnology, Government of India in August 2002. The institute is located in close proximity to other research institutions at Bhubaneswar. The institute was earlier established on 11 February 1989 and was under the administrative and financial control of Department of Science and Technology, Government of Odisha. Prime minister of India, Atal Bihari Vajpayee dedicated the institute to the nation on 15 July 2003 with a declaration to develop the institute as a "National Centre for Excellence". The mandate of ILS is to undertake basic and translational research in frontier areas of life sciences. The research interests of the faculty are in three major areas: (a) Infectious Disease Biology, (b) Gene Function and Regulation and (c) Translation Research and Technology Development. In addition, new collaborations with industry have been established to tap commercial potential of laboratory science.

==== Indian Institute of Public Health ====
Indian Institute of Public Health, Bhubaneswar is one of the four institutes set up by PHFI as a part of its charter to build public health capacity in India. IIPH, Bhubaneswar, commenced its academic activities from August 2010. The institute offers a Post Graduate Diploma course in Public Health Management, launched on 2 August 2010. Government doctors from Odisha and Chhattisgarh and self-sponsored candidates are participating in this course. In addition to this, various short term training programmes, workshops and research activities are being undertaken by the institute.

==== National Institute of Rehabilitation Training and Research ====
The National Institute of Rehabilitation Training and Research (NIRTAR) is an autonomous body established in 1975 under the Ministry of Social Justice and Empowerment, Govt. of India. It is located in a beautiful rural area at Olatpur, Cuttack, 30 km from Cuttack City Bus Stand. It conducts three bachelor's degree courses in Physiotherapy, Occupational Therapy, Prosthetics and Orthotics, two Postgraduate courses in Occupational Therapy and Physiotherapy affiliated to Utkal University, Bhubaneswar. It also has an accreditation for DNB in Physical Medicine and Rehabilitation of National Board of Examination (NBE), New Delhi.

==== Regional Medical Research Centre ====
Regional Medical Research Centre, Bhubaneswar, was established in 1981 by Indian Council of Medical Research. It conducts interdisciplinary research on locally prevailing communicable and non-communicable diseases. It provides training and research to post graduate students for Ph.D./ MD degree, MSc. dissertation and short term training to the doctors and technicians from state health departments and NVBDCP, Delhi.

=== Technical ===
==== Biju Patnaik National Steel Institute ====
Biju Patnaik National Steel Institute (BPNSI), Puri is an autonomous Institute constituted by Ministry of Steel, Government of India was established on 1 January 2002 for the development of steel sector with an emphasis on the secondary steel sector. BPNSI is one of the few institutes in the country and the only institute in Odisha that offers a curriculum in Iron & Steel manufacturing & Plant Management. Currently the institute is offering a one and half year “Advanced Certificate Course on Iron and Steel Manufacturing & Plant Management.” The institute plans to offer Degree and P.G. Diploma courses in the future.

==== Central Institute of Plastics Engineering and Technology ====
Central Institute of Plastic Engineering and Technology, Bhubaneswar established in 1986 is one of the 15 state-of-the-art centres spread across India devoted to academic, technology support & research (ATR) activities for the growth of plastics & allied industries in the country. CIPET, Bhubaneswar has a track record of best performance centre consistently for last few years and rated to be the best centre. The institute offers B.Tech., M.Tech. and PhD program on Plastics Engineering and Technology in affiliation with Biju Patnaik University of Technology.

==== Central Rice Research Institute ====
The Central Rice Research Institute (CRRI) is located in the city of Cuttack. It is one of the premier institutions in Asia for rice research. It was established by the centre in 1946 with an experimental farm land of 0.6 km^{2} provided by the Odisha government. It is the second largest institution dedicated to rice research after the one at Manila. The institute has two research stations- Central Rainfed Upland Rice Research Station (CRURRS), Hazaribagh, in Jharkhand, and the Regional Rainfed Lowland Rice Research Station (RRLRRS), Gerua, in Assam. These research stations were established to tackle the problems of rainfed uplands, and flood prone rainfed lowlands, respectively. Two Krishi Vigyan Kendras (KVKs) also function under the CRRI located at Santhapur, Cuttack and Jainagar, Koderma.

==== Central Tool Room & Training Centre ====
Central Tool Room & Training Centre, Bhubaneswar is an autonomous institute under the Ministry of MSME, Government of India. Since 1991 imparting industry oriented long & short term training programmes on CAD/CAM, Tool Design & Manufacturing, Tool & Die Making, Diploma in Mechatronics, CNC Programming & Machining, Machine Maintenance, CCNA, Industrial Automation, VLSI, Hardware & Networking Management, ITI (Machinist/Welder) etc.

==== Indian Institute of Handloom Technology ====
I.I.H.T. Bargarh, the fifth central sector institute came into existence on 2 June 2008. Initially it started functioning in the panchayat college campus in Bargarh township which is a prominent place in western part of Odisha. The permanent campus is under construction on Bargarh-Bhatli road, 8 km from the district headquarters. It offers a diploma course in handloom and textile technology.

==== Institute of Physics ====
The Institute Of Physics, Bhubaneswar is an autonomous research institution funded jointly by the Department Of Atomic Energy (DAE) and the Government of Odisha. It provides research facilities for postgraduate research.

==== National Institute of Science Education & Research ====
The National Institute of Science Education and Research (NISER) is a premier research institution in India along the lines of the internationally reputed IISc in Bangalore, and five sister institutions, the IISERs. Instead of the Ministry of Human Resources Development, NISER operates under the umbrella of the Department of Atomic Energy (DAE). It was established in 2007, in Bhubaneswar, Odisha, when the first batch of students were admitted into its integrated postgraduate programs.

NISER is dedicated to graduate education and research only. It offers M.S.,5 year integrated M.S. as well as PhD degrees in physics, chemistry, mathematics, and biology. The Odisha government has provided 301 acres (1.2 km^{2})of land free of cost for the upcoming campus at Jatani (22 km south from Bhubaneswar).

Keeping in view the paucity of central government institutions in the state, the Government of Odisha has mooted the idea of a National Institute for Technology Education and Research (NITER), a sister institution of NISER, in Bhubaneswar.

==== Indian Institute of Science Education and Research ====
Established by the Ministry of Human Resource Development IISER, Berhampur is one of the 7 such institutes spread across India. It started taking students since 2016. It provides BS, MS and PhD degrees in basic sciences.

==== Indian Institute of Technology ====
The Indian Institute of Technology, Bhubaneswar is the third and one of the largest of eight new Indian Institutes of Technology established by the MHRD, Government of India in 2008–2009. A total of 935 acres (3.78 km^{2}) of land has been allocated at Arugul (a village 25 km south of Bhubaneswar) towards the self-contained campus for 10,000 students and 1,100 faculty, making it the second largest of all IITs after the one at Kharagpur.

As of 2009, there are undergraduate programs leading to B.Tech. degrees in civil engineering, electrical engineering, and mechanical engineering. Postgraduate students are being admitted into the M.Tech. and PhD programs.

==== International Institute of Information Technology ====
International Institute of Information Technology, Bhubaneswar is an information technology higher education institute established in 2006 by the Government of Odisha. It has been converted to a unitary university on 20 January 2014. It is located 8 km from Bhubaneswar

==== Institute of Minerals and Materials Technology ====
The Institute of Minerals and Materials Technology IMMT, (formerly Regional Research Laboratory, Bhubaneswar) was set up as a premier establishment of the Council of Scientific & Industrial Research (CSIR), New Delhi in 1964 in the State of Odisha, in eastern India. The laboratory specializes in providing R&D support for process and product development with special emphasis on conservation and sustainable utilization of natural resources. Over the years, IMMT has developed S&T capabilities in a wide range of areas from mineralogy to materials engineering. The laboratory has expertise in conducting technology oriented programmes in mining and mineral/bio-mineral processing, metal extraction and materials characterization, process engineering, industrial waste management, pollution monitoring and control, marine and forest products development, utilization of medicinal and aromatic plants and appropriate technologies for societal development.

==== National Institute of Fashion Technology ====
National Institute of Fashion Technology(NIFT), Bhubaneswar centre started functioning from June 2010 from its transit campus situated in Centurion Institute of Technology, near HP Gas Plant, 5 km north of Bhubaneswar. The course being offered at the institute at present, include specialization in disciplines such as Bachelor of Design in Textile Design, Fashion Design, Fashion and Lifestyle Accessory Design and Fashion communication, Bachelor of Fashion Technology and Master of Fashion Management Studies. A total of 35 acres (140,000 m^{2}) of land have been granted by the state government. The NIFT would be funded through the Indian Ministry of Commerce. It is admitting students from 2010.

==== National Institute of Technology ====
Established in the year 1961, The National Institute of Technology (NIT) located at the steel city of Rourkela is the foremost engineering degree granting institutions in Odisha. It has consistently been ranked among the top engineering institutes in the country, most recently being placed as the 3rd best Engineering Institute in Eastern India, after IIT Kharagpur and IIT Guwahati by DataQuest.

== State level public institutions ==
=== Berhampur University ===
Berhampur University was established in southern Odisha in 1965, as the third oldest university in the state. The university has 25 affiliated colleges and covers the districts of Gajapati, Ganjam, Kandhamal, Koraput, Malkangiri, Nabarangpur and Rayagada.

=== Biju Patnaik University of Technology ===
The Biju Patnaik University of Technology, Rourkela, was created by an act of the Odisha state legislature in the year 2002. Almost all the engineering, pharmacy, architecture and most of the colleges offering MBA degree programmes are either constituent or affiliated colleges. The university has 110 colleges, both constituent and affiliated, with around 58,000 students. The disciplines include engineering and architecture, business management and hotel management, computer studies and pharmacy.

=== Odisha University of Technology and Research (OUTR) ===
The Odisha University of Technology and Research (OUTR), formerly College of Engineering and Technology Bhubaneswar(CET-B), is a public technical unitary university under the state government of Odisha. It was initially established within the purview of OUAT in Bhubaneswar as a constituent autonomous college since 1981. It got separated from OUAT since 2002, having its own vast campus of about 139 acres (0.56 km^{2}) in Ghatikia, Khandagiri, Bhubaneswar. It offers undergraduate programs in Architecture, Computer science, Information Technology, Electrical Engineering, Civil Engineering, Instrumentation & Electronics Engineering, Bio-Technology Engineering, Mechanical engineering, Textile engineering and Fashion Technology. It offers M Tech/M Arch/MCA, Applied M Sc & Phd degrees in various engineering & science areas including Nanobiotechnology, VLSI & Embedded Systems, Computer Science and Engineering, Mechanical System Design & Dynamics, Textile Chemical Processing, Thermal Engineering, Structural Engineering, Industrial Engineering and Management, Urban and Regional Planning, Biotechnology, Applied Physics, Applied Chemistry, Mathematics and computing. It places about 75% of its students every year before they graduate and has a large number of students interning all over India.

=== Government College Of Engineering, Keonjhar ===
Government College of Engineering, Keonjhar is the only Government engineering college in North Odisha. The institute started under the Department of Industries, Government of Odisha in 1956 offering Diploma education in Mining Engineering and later in 1995 introduced degree curriculum. Electrical Engineering and Mechanical Engineering branches were added in 1997. In 2006, the government of Odisha declared Orissa School of Mining Engineering (Degree Stream) as a constituent college of Biju Pattnaik University of Technology, Rourkela under self finance mode to develop it as a centre of excellence in the field of Engineering & Technology. In 2008, Mineral Engineering and in 2009, Metallurgical & Materials Engineering were added. In 2011, as per a government notification, it has been declared as a full-fledged government engineering college. In 2015, Computer Science & Engineering and Civil Engineering were added.

=== Fakir Mohan University ===
Fakir Mohan University, Vyasa Vihar, Balasore was established by the Government of Odisha, in 1999.

=== Indira Gandhi Institute of Technology ===
The Indira Gandhi Institute of Technology (IGIT) is located at Sarang in the industrial belt of Talcher. It was established in 1982 by the government of Odisha. In addition to four year undergraduate degrees in electrical, mechanical, chemical and civil engineering, and metallurgical & materials science, it offers three year diplomas in a few technical disciplines.

=== Institute of Mathematics and Applications ===
The Institute of Mathematics and Applications, (IMA) located in Bhubaneswar is an academic institution, established by the government of Odisha to conduct research in pure and applied mathematics, and to conduct postgraduate degree programs in the field. It was established in 1999.

=== Maharaja Krushna Chandra Gajapati Medical College ===
The Maharaja Krushna Chandra Gajapati (MKCG) Medical College is a medical college in Berhampur. It was originally started in 1976 as an extension of the SCB Medical College. It operates under Berhampur University. It offers MBBS and MD degrees and also provides training in medical related fields.

=== North Orissa University ===
North Orissa University, Baripada is a public and open university established in 1998. The jurisdiction of the university extends over two districts, Mayurbhanj and Keonjhar. There are 103 affiliated colleges, both general and professional, catering to the demand of higher education.

=== Orissa University of Agriculture and Technology ===
The Orissa University of Agriculture and Technology (OUAT) was established in the city of Bhubaneswar in 1962. It is dedicated to agriculture related research and education, and has seven colleges as well as a centre for postgraduate studies.

=== Parala Maharaja Engineering College, Berhampur ===
Parala Maharaja Engineering College was established in 2009 by the government of Odisha, and started functioning in its academic building at Sitalapalli, Berhampur with four branches. It is a constituent college of Biju Patnaik University of Technology. The college was inaugurated by Sri Naveen Patnaik.

=== Ravenshaw University ===
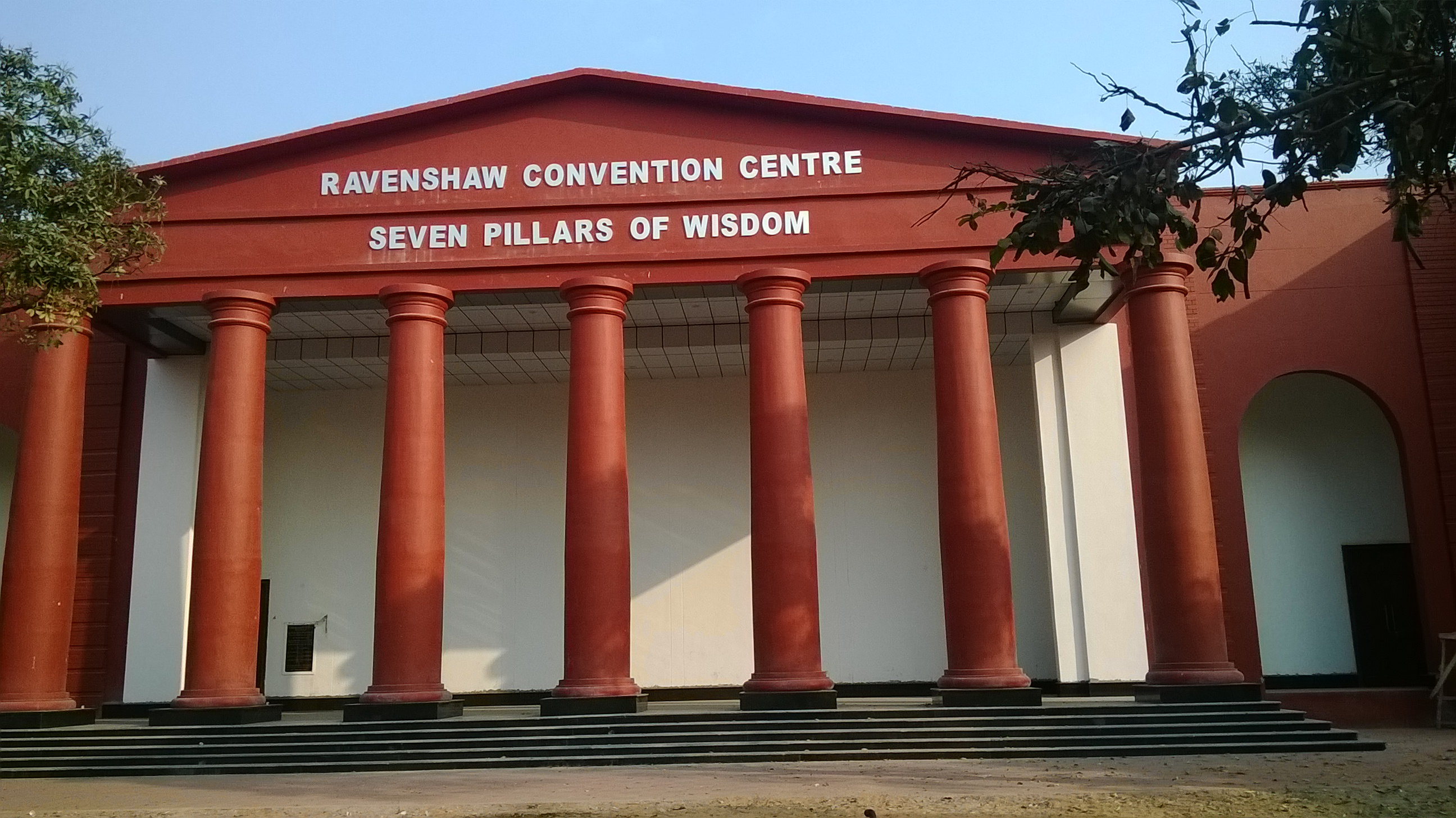
Ravenshaw Convention Centre, Ravenshaw University, Cuttack, Odisha

Upgraded from Ravenshaw College one of the oldest and largest colleges of India, the Ravenshaw University came into existence on 15 November 2006. Originally affiliated to University of Calcutta and thereafter to Patna University and then finally to Utkal University the institution finally got its own identity and became one of the most reputed universities of the Odisha state. Presently the university runs 23 Post-Graduate courses with research facilities and 27 Undergraduate honours courses.

=== Sambalpur University ===
Sambalpur University (Jyoti Vihar) in Burla, in western Odisha is another important university covering the districts of Bargarh, Bolangir, Boudh, Deogarh, Jharsuguda, Kalahandi, Nuapada, Sambalpur, Subarnapur, Sundargarh as well as the Athamallik Sub-Division of Angul district. It offers postgraduate education in twenty seven subjects. The university has been functioning since 1967.

=== Govt Ayurvedic College and Hospital, Balangir ===
GAC balangir is the premier government ayurvedic institute in the state of Odisha established in 1975. It offers both UG and PG degree to students. It also has a city hospital named Sardeswari Government Ayurvedic hospital in daily market.

=== Shriram Chandra Bhanja Medical College ===
Established in 1944, The Shriram Chandra Bhanja Medical College (SCB Medical College) at Cuttack, is the premier medical institution in Odisha and one of the oldest in India. It offers postgraduate degrees in all broad areas of medicine. It also runs super speciality training facilities in several areas such as cardiology, neurosurgery, and radiotherapy. There also exists a dental wing under the SCB Medical college.

=== Shri Jagannath Sanskrit Vishvavidayalaya ===
Shri Jagannath Sanskrit Vishvavidayalaya was established in Puri by the erstwhile Chief Minister of Odisha Janaki Ballabh Pattanayak, an eminent scholar of Sanskrit, on 7 July 1981. It is the third Sanskrit university of the country next to Sampurnananda Sanskrit University of Banaras and Kameswar Singh Sanskrit University of Darabhanga.

=== Utkal University ===
Utkal University (Vani Vihar) was the first university to be established in Odisha in 1943. It is also the seventeenth oldest in India. It is located in Bhubaneswar and has about 3,000 postgraduate and doctoral students enrolled. The university has jurisdiction over nine districts in Odisha, namely Angul, Cuttack, Dhenkanal, Jajpur, Jagatsinghpur, Kendrapara, Khurda, Nayagarh and Puri catering to the needs of higher education of a population of over 11 million people.

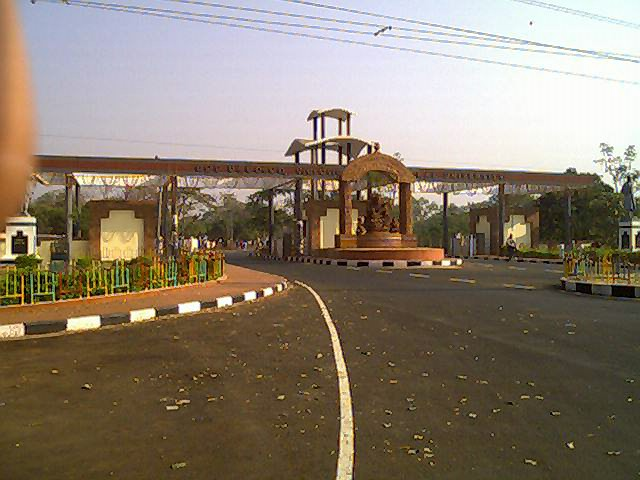
Main entrance to Utkal University

=== Utkal University of Culture ===
The Utkal University of Culture is a newly established institution located in Bhubaneswar.

=== Vikram Dev University ===
The Vikram Dev University (formerly: Vikram Deb Autonomous College) is a institutionally transformed university at Jeypore, Koraput. It was established as College in 1947, making it one of the oldest educational institutions in Odisha.

=== Veer Surendra Sai Medical College ===
The Veer Surendra Sai (VSS) Medical college and hospital has been in operation since 1959 in Burla. It offers undergraduate and postgraduate education in medicine and surgery, besides offering training courses in pharmacy and nursing.

=== Veer Surendra Sai University of Technology, Burla ===
Established in 1956 at Burla, the Veer Surendra Sai University of Technology, Burla, formerly known as University College of Engineering (UCE) is Odisha's oldest, and one of the oldest and prestigious engineering institutions of East India. Initially an autonomous college since 1991, it was elevated as a university in the year 2009, as a result of a move by the Government of Odisha to accord it with the status of a unitary university. It offers undergraduate, postgraduate and doctoral degrees in several engineering disciplines. VSSUT receives financial grants from All India Council of Technical Education and University Grants Commission (India), two central government agencies, as well as from the state government. While other major engineering institutions (such as the IITs) only enjoy deemed university status, VSSUT is one of India's full scale university for engineering and technology. The campus covers an area of 203 acres (0.82 km2) with an expansion capacity up to 503 acres (2.04 km2), as per the land allotted to it. There is a proposal to upgrade this to NIT. In the year 2012 VSSUT was awarded 12B status by University Grants Commission (India).

== Private institutions ==
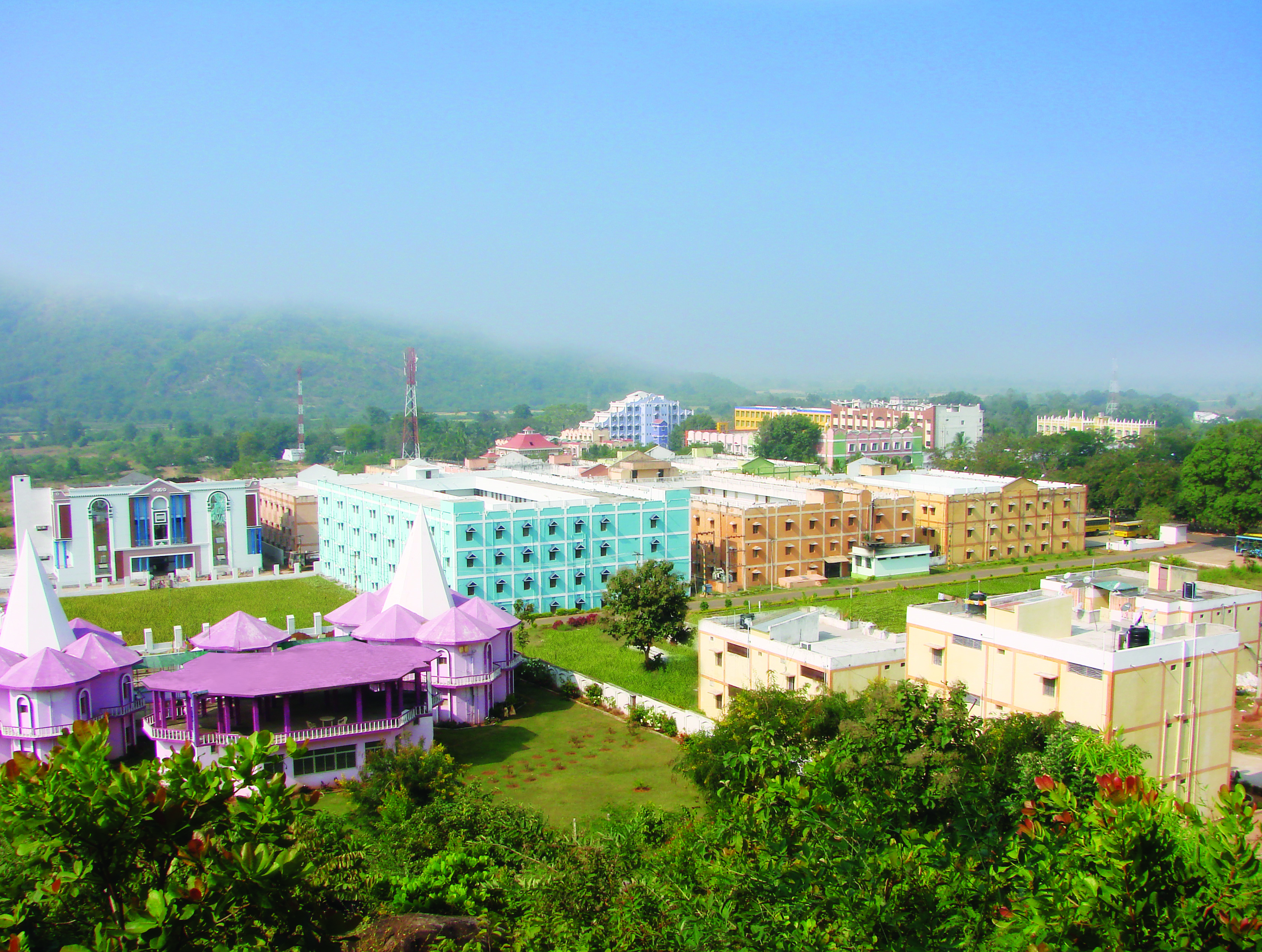
GIET campus overview

=== GIET University ===
GIET University (GIETU) (formerly known as Gandhi Institute of Engineering and Technology) is one of the most prestigious universities of India. The university status of GIETU was Conferred through an act of Odisha Legislative Assembly and forthwith approved by UGC, New Delhi.

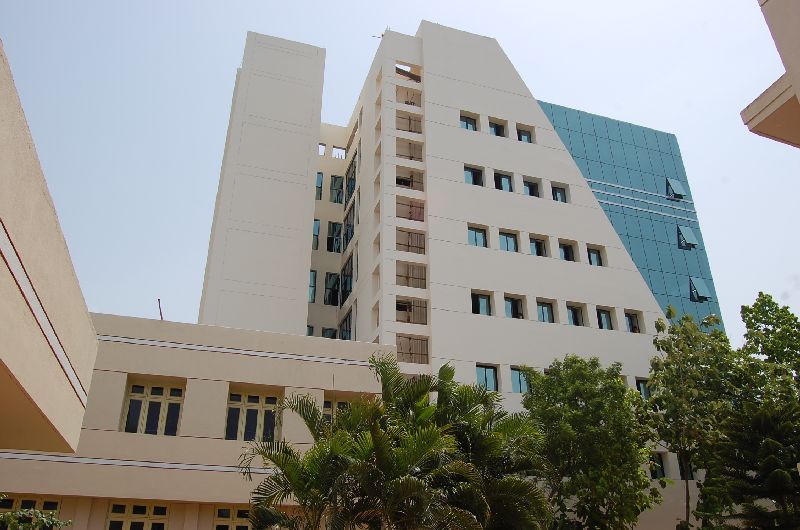
Xavier Institute of Management, Bhubaneswar is a premier business school in India

=== Centurion University ===
Centurion University, Bhubaneswar, is Odisha's first private state university.

=== ICFAI University ===
Hyderabad based Institute of Chartered Financial Analysts of India (ICFAI) has signed a memorandum of understanding with the chief minister of Odisha, Mr. Naveen Patnaik, to set up a university in the outskirts of the city of Bhubaneswar. ICFAI plan to buy 150 acres (0.6 km^{2}) of land from private parties in Jatni, near the Khurda Road station. The university is budgeted at Rs. 150 crores (1.5 billion). It will function primarily as a business school.

=== Kalinga Institute of Industrial Technology Deemed to be University ===
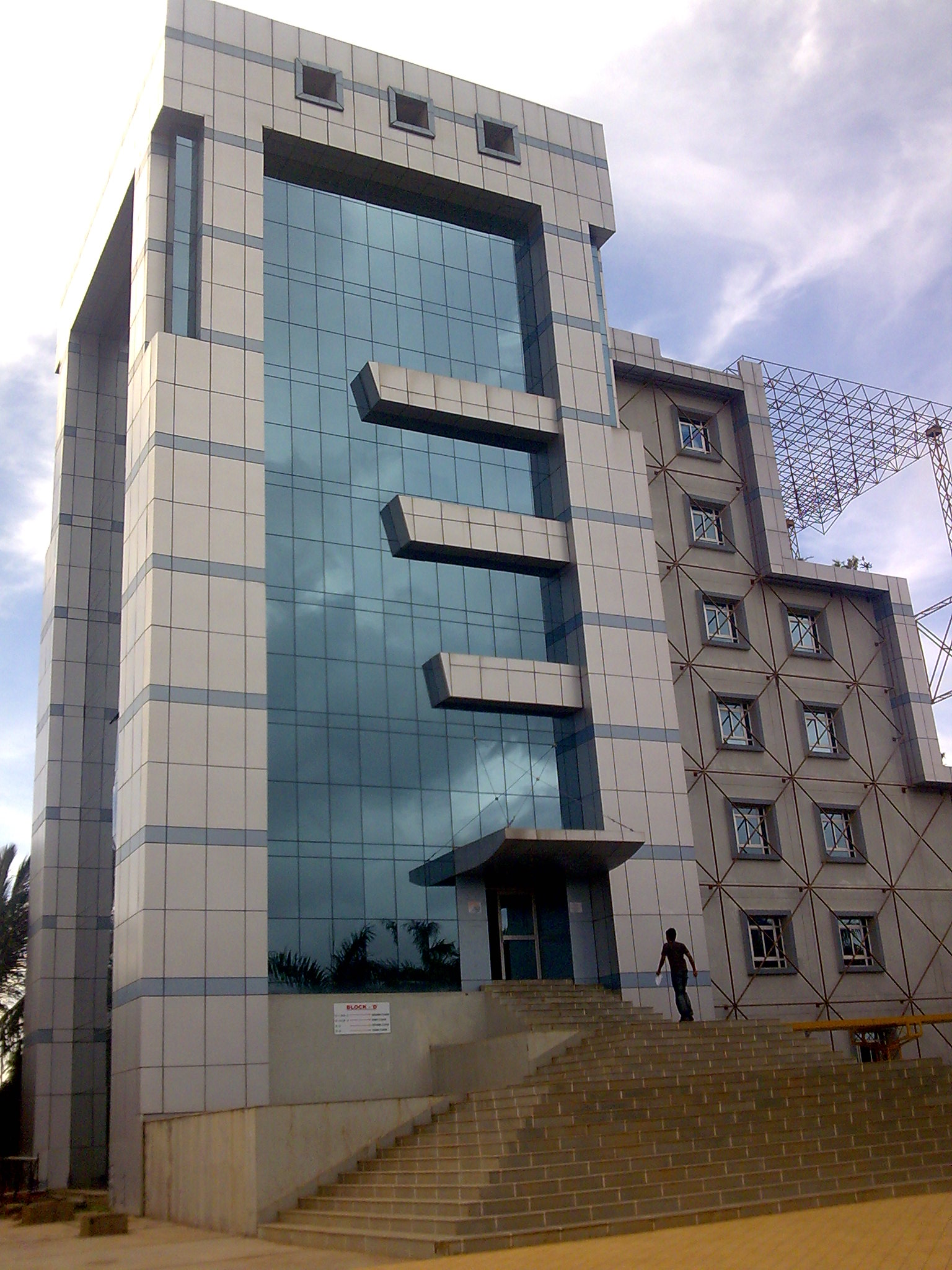
a building of KIIT's School of Technology

The Kalinga Institute of Industrial Technology (KIIT) is established in Bhubaneswar in 1992. Academic programmes of KIIT University are conducted by its seven constituent schools – School of Technology, School of Computer Application, School of Management, School of Rural Management, School of Medicine, School of Biotechnology and KIIT Law School.

=== Siksha 'O' Anusandhan (SOA) Deemed to be University ===
Siksha 'O' Anusandhan gained Deemed to be university status from the UGC in 2007. SOA has the highest grade of 'A' from NAAC. Additionally, SUM Hospital (its affiliated hospital) has been awarded with the prestigious NABH accreditation.Link to SOA University's Website

=== Sri Sri University ===
Sri Sri University has been established under the Sri Sri University Act, 2009. The Government of Odisha has leased out about 187 acres of land near Bidyadharpur, Cuttack for the purpose of setting up the university. The total area of construction is expected to be 3,000,000 square feet and is slated to be completed in a phased manner in the next six years. On completion, the university campus will cater to the needs of 10,000 students and around 2000 faculty staff. The university currently offers MBA programs in Agribusiness, General Management and Entrepreneurship.

=== Xavier Institute of Management, Bhubaneswar ===
Xavier Institute of Management, Bhubaneswar (XIMB) was established in 1987. It owes its origin to a contract between the government of Odisha and the Odisha Jesuit Society. XIMB is governed by a board consisting of representatives from the Odisha Jesuit Society, the government of India, the government of Odisha, and invited industrialists and academics.

XIMB has been ranked among the top 10 business schools in India. The institution offers postgraduate programs, leading to Masters and PhD degrees in business management, rural management, human resource management, sustainability management as well several professional training programs. It has a few research centres in areas such as entrepreneurship, utility regulation, small and micro enterprise development, and healthcare management. XIMB grown up to become "XIM University".

== Institutions through public-private partnership ==
=== Indian Institute of Information Technology, Brahmapur ===
In June 2007, the UPA government in New Delhi decided to establish a central government funded IIITs in each state. The IIIT in Odisha would be established in Brahmapur, and unlike its sister institute in Bhubaneswar, would receive funding from the centre.

The IIIT at Berhampur is being established on a 100-acre (0.40 km^{2}) land and this is likely to be functional by end of 2009. This will help attracting more IT companies to South Odisha and the presence of STPI Brahmapur and IT Park at Brahmapur will also help. The Marine Bio-Technology Park is also planned for Brahmapur.

=== Sambalpur University Institute of Information Technology, Sambalpur ===
Thanks to Prof. Arun Pujari, Sambalpur university will get an Indian Institutes of Information Technology like IT institution.

== Plans ==
=== Bhubaneswar as an emerging education hub ===
National institutes of excellence have been established recently in Bhubaneswar, while several more are planned, such as AIIMS, NISER, IIT, IIIT and a National university. There are several prominent private universities, such as XIMB and ICFAI University. Institutions dedicated to research such as the Institute of Physics, and the Institute of Mathematics and Applications are also located here. Additionally, the city also houses several Odisha government funded public universities, and over 70 technical institutions, which well above than any other city in eastern India. The city is also being promoted as an Information Technology Investment Region (ITIR) by the government. A total of 40 km^{2} of land has been allocated for the purpose, out of which about 60% will be devoted to research and development. The Chief Minister of the state has asserted that Bhubaneswar is poised to emerge as India's foremost education hub.

=== Odisha Higher Education Vision 2020 ===
The Orissa Higher Education Vision 2020, an effort organized by leading national and international researchers, scientists, and academicians of Odia origin, envisages a globally competitive higher education system in Orissa by 2020, with four tiered knowledge centres being developed throughout the state. An international level knowledge hub comparable to the San Francisco Bay Area or Boston metropolitan area in the USA is suggested in the rapidly expanding Bhubaneswar-Cuttack-Khurda-Puri metropolitan region. This will consist of several world class universities, technical and medical institutions, and laboratories, including NISER, IIT, IIIT, National University, National Law University, AIIMS, Vedanta University, Sri Sri University, NIPER, and several other new institutions to be established by the central government or through public-private partnership, as well as private institutions. At the second tier would be five other metropolitan regions, Rourkela, Sambalpur-Jharsuguda (IIHT Bargarh, OUAT branch at Chiplima, XIMB campus at Sambalpur, CIFT Burla, plan to upgrade VSS medical college and GM college to university status), Berhampur, Balasore-Baripada, and Jeypore-Koraput-Sunabeda, each with two universities, multiple engineering and medical colleges, as well as one or more national level institutions. The third tier knowledge hubs, located in all urban areas throughout the state, would have a university, an autonomous college, as well as a medical and an engineering college. Lastly, the fourth tier would include smaller towns, which would have at least an autonomous college and a trade school.

=== Under construction and planned medical and engineering colleges ===
Medical college Bhawanipatna Medical college Keonjhar by ahayog Healthcare and Research Foundation Medical college Jagatpur, Cuttack by ahayog Healthcare and Research Foundation Medical college Talcher by MCL Hitech medical college Rourkela Medical college Rourkela by SAIL upgrading the IGH Govt Medical college Bolangir and Balesore Central university Koraput will establish a medical college at Koraput ESIC medical college Bhubaneswar AIIMS Bhubaneswar Medical college at Angul. University in western Orissa with the partnership between government and industries Upgradation Jharsuguda engineering school to engineering college A medical college between jharsuguda and Sundargarh by the mines operating there A power management institute to be established at Jharsuguda 2 branch of XIMB bhubaneswar at Sambalpur and Bolangir

Summary,

== State legislation pertaining to higher education ==
The Odisha state legislative assembly (Vidhan Sabha) will be formulating a Private Universities Act to facilitate the growth of private universities such as Vedanta University, Sri Sri University. The higher education department of the state will draft the bill, which will be referred to the law department, before being placed in the assembly. This bill would guarantee the fiscal and administrative autonomy for private institutions.

=== Vedanta University act ===
The Odisha legislature was going to consider a specific act to make Vedanta university a statutory body. After the passage of the act, the university would have established its own, independent governing board, where the Odisha government would not exercise any control. Later news reports suggested that the plan for the Vedanta University was a "closed chapter"

== Problems ==
Until 2007, the Ministry of Human Resources and Development (MHRD) of the Government of India had set up several premier technical institutes, across the country that produce India's world class talent pool in science, engineering, and management, and contribute strongly to the economic development of the state where they are located as well as the nation. These institutions included the original seven IITs, the Indian Institute of Science, the original five IIMs, the Indian Statistical Institute, several earlier central universities, and a few other smaller institutions, all of which receive direct funding from the centre. There were reports of large scale discrimination in setting up these institutions of higher learning against a few states, especially Odisha. It was observed within scholarly circles that Odisha was routinely discriminated against by the Indian government, which had caused the state to lag behind the rest of the nation in terms of infrastructure, poverty reduction, literacy, education, and health until very recently.

Until recently, none of the premier institutions of national importance were located in the state of Odisha. In terms of per capita funding received from the HRD ministry, it was among the bottom-most of all states along with Bihar and Rajasthan, and a few very small states in the north eastern region. The non-allocation of quality educational institutions to the state of Odisha by New Delhi has been interpreted by various quarters, ranging from politicians to Odia academics living abroad, as proof of discrimination against the state by the HRD ministry. Odisha, the 9th largest state of India, which has 3.6% of the population of India and abundance of natural resources, received a minuscule 0.73% of the allocated budget. The inequitable distribution of resources by the central government to the various states was identified in 1991 as a cause of regional disparities. Studies had blamed central government policies above any other factor, as the cause of Odisha's recent backwardness.

There were also early allegations of discrimination in establishing newer institutions, such as the IIESTs, a group of technical institutions planned to be IIT clones. They were set up by upgrading existing NITs and other state funded prominent engineering institutions. Several institutions have been identified by the Indian government for this purpose, but none in Odisha, which had the University College of Engineering at Burla, one of the oldest in India, as well as NIT, Rourkela which ranked higher than four of the five institutions that were selected. It has been alleged that the government had originally picked Bhubaneswar, the capital city of Odisha as one of the locations for an IISER, which was later shifted to Kolkata.

As of 2009, there is a demand for one of the new IIMs to be established in Odisha, on grounds that the state is witnessing large-scale foreign investment, and because until recently, it had been the bottom-most state in Indian central government funded institutions.

== See also ==
- List of institutions of higher education in Odisha
