= Digambara Patra =

- Born: Kalahandi, Odisha, India
- Education: Indian Institute of Technology Madras
- Alma mater: Sambalpur University (MSc); Indian Institute of Technology Madras (PhD)

Digambara Patra is a professor of Chemistry at the American University of Beirut.

== Education ==
Digambara acquired a PhD degree in Chemistry working with Professor A. K. Mishra at Indian Institute of Technology Madras. Subsequently, he spent in University of Basel, Switzerland, Forschungszentrum Jülich, Germany and Waseda University in Tokyo, Japan for his postdoctoral studies before joining American University of Beirut. He is a recipient of Alexander von Humboldt Research Fellowship and JSPS Postdoctoral Fellowship. His research focuses on nanochemistry and optical sensing. He was listed among the world's top 2% scientist by Stanford University in 2020.

== Research ==
With Professor A. K. Mishra at Indian Institute of Technology Madras, Digambara discovered that Synchronous Fluorescence Scan are the easy, fast and sensitive approach to determine adulteration of petroleum fuel which itself is a serious problem in South Asia. They attributed that the presence of extensive inner filter effects and resonance energy transfer in petroleum fuels are the major causes of the distinctive characteristics of these spectra in adulterated samples. Together both the authors later on developed total synchronous fluorescence scan spectra to understand petroleum products and showed that the total synchronous fluorescence scan profile is different from the excitation-emission matrix. Digambara along with his collaborator Dr. Rohit Kumar Rana at Indian Institute of Chemical Technology designed a new type of microcapsule-embedded fluorescent molecule that has the potential to measure hydrogen ion concentration in cells under physiological conditions and also to estimate ammonia concentration in environmental samples. He is one of the few researchers to work on use of Curcumin, a molecule obtained form food spice Turmeric, for preparing metallic nanoparticles using green synthetic routes to tune nanoparticle shape/size and towards various sensing applications. His research also modifies curcumin using nanotechnology for selective sensing and to improve its delivery and biomedical applications. His research first time showed that curcumin can be applied a membrane fluorescence probe to study liposomes properties.

== View on educational and infrastructure development ==
Over the years, Digambara along with Professor Chitta Baral and group of other Indian educationists in abroad have been critical over the "regional imbalances" in education in India, which triggered political debate in India. He collaborated, wrote and campaigned with Prof. Baral in various projects for the education, infrastructure and other development in Odisha. Subsequently, National Institute of Science Education and Research was established in Bhubaneswar and Indian Government established Indian Institute of Technology, Indian Institutes of Management and Central Universities across Indian states to overcome regional imbalances. When Indian policy makers are largely focussed to build national institutions in metro and cities, Digambara has been advocating the development of higher education in rural part of Indian and establishing rural university, IIT and other national universities in semi-urban and rural India. He has been a strong critic of recent establishment of higher educational institutions such as national universities, Indian Institute of Technology, Indian Institute of Science, Indian Institute of Management, etc. in state capitals, metro and trier II cities of India and emphasizes that such institutions should rather be built in semi-urban rural clusters of India to reduce gap between rich cities and underdeveloped region of India. Despite his advocacy for higher educational institution in semi-urban area, Dr Patra was vocal in protesting when Odisha Government decided to establish Central University of Orissa at Koraput. In his protest against the move, Dr Patra filed a Public Interest Litigation in Supreme Court of India against State Govt. of India and central Government of India, which the court registered but later on closed the case citing no violation of legality was found. He continued his protest saying he was not against establishing Central University of Orissa at Koraput rather than due to fact that the state Government took a decision against Kalahandi based on political agenda and consideration at the last movement. He contested along with many other local groups with evidences that the argument by Odisha state Government about non availability of land for establishing a Central University in Kalahandi was false. Later on his petition to Prime Minister of India was forwarded to Ministry Human Resource Development (MHRD) in 2008 for appropriate action, MHRD subsequently said based on letter of Sri Bikram Keshari Deo, then Member of Parliament of Kalahandi, the ministry could consider to establish a branch of Indira Gandhi National Tribal University, Amarkantak in Kalahandi. Subsequently, on 26 Dec 2008 he wrote to Odisha Government to convert Government Autonomous College Bhawanipatna to a University in the line of University tag given to Ravenshaw College, UCE Burla and Khallikote College. Coincidentally next day on 27 Dec 2008 Odisha chief minister announced an Engineering College and an Agriculture College at Bhawanipatna keeping his earlier promise. However, the demand to convert Government Autonomous College Bhawanipatna to a University was further taken by students and local leaders for over a decade. Finally, Odisha Government announced to convert Government Autonomous College Bhawanipatna to a University in Feb 2019, just before the assembly election. He was also vocal to establish a Government medical college or health University in Kalahandi instead of a private medical college, this helped in local and public pressure, the state Government subsequently announced a Government medical college in Kalahandi. He also initiated and campaigned for a Central Agriculture University or a state agriculture university in Kalahandi because of the agriculture potential in the region and central location, and took to local MP, subsequently then Union minister of Agriculture asked Odisha Govt. to study this referring to letter by Kalahandi MP and before election of 2014 Odisha Govt. had included in its manifesto to establish second Agriculture University in an area under Kalahandi Balangir Koraput Region. But no progress has been made, Kalahandi Sikhya Vikas Parishad and local people have been demanding the same.

Among few Non-resident Indian, Digambara, is of opinion that railway infrastructure development is one of the keys to success and can bring economic prosperity to such a backward region arguing for establishing railway factory in place like Kalahandi. He initiated demands for a rail factory of KBK region, especially in Kalahandi in 2008 and wrote a letter to then General Secretary of Indian National Congress Party, Rahul Gandhi. In the railway budget 2010–11, one of the railway Wagon Factories was proposed in Bhubaneswar/Kalahandi, but Dr Patra exposed the state Government when it sent a proposal for railway Wagon Factory in Ganjam citing non-availability of railway land in Kalahandi, Digambara criticized the move saying the proposed land in Ganjam was not railway land too. He questioned the motive behind Odisha Chief Minister Naveen Patnaik's stand when in 2009 Naveen Patnaik wrote to former railway minister Lalu Prasad Yadav emphasizing the need to improve the rail network in the Kalahandi Balangir Koraput Region and establishment of a rail coach factory in a backward area of Orissa-hinting to locate in one of the Kalahandi Balangir Koraput Region districts. Later on Kalahandi MP Bhakta Charan Das took the issue to the Parliament of India, thus making central Govt. included a Wagon Maintenance Workshop in Kalahandi in 2013-14 railway budget. Again this was shifted to Vishakapatnam (Vadlapudi) because of technical reason. Moreover, he continue writing on this issue and in the 2017-18 union budget, an Electric Loco Periodical Overhauling Workshop was announced to be set up in Kalahandi with an investment of Rs 186 crore. Dr Patra has been mobilizing to develop railway infrastructure and other social development in rural India, specially in Odisha, Chhattisgarh, MP etc. from where Indian railway makes most-profit but invest little in railway infrastructure development and establishing railway factories. Despite ECOR being one of the most profit making zones of Indian railways, he has charged railway ministry being unfair to Odisha and Chhattisgarh since decades, whereas many loss-making projects in Bihar and West Bengal were given favourable approval due to influence of former railway ministers. He cites major railway development and factories were approved in Raebareli, Amethi, Chapra, etc. only due to favoritism of powerful political leaders rather than due to actual source of raw materials like coal or iron supply for railway's own requirements, for instance, he compares site in Kalahandi of Odisha, located at the close junction of three India's public sector steel plants in Bhilai, Rourkela and Visakhapatnam, close to Mahanadi Coal Limited's coal blocks in Angul and Jharsuguda as well as nearer to National alumina supplier (NALCO), is ideal location to get raw materials supply for Indian railway to establish railway coach and manufacturing factory against the site selected in Raebareli or Chhapra where no coal, alumina or iron is available in its close proximity. He appealed to established railway university in Odisha-Chhattisgarh border. Poor connectivity of train and railway network in tribal pocket of India has been another his concern. The 56 km Lanjigarh road-Junagarh line of Lanjigarh road-Amaguda route took 25 years to get completed. However, surveyed Junagarh-Ambaguda portion of this route has not yet been approved which will bring railway connection to tribal dominated Nabarangur district. He has been continuously writing since a decade to speed up Junagarh -Nabrangpur railway line works which has a rate of return above 14 percent. He also writes on to bring reform in Governance, livelihood and development of Odisha, Kalahandi Balangir Koraput Region and Kalahandi district's development.
