= KBK =

KBK could refer to:

- Grass Koiari language; ISO 639-3 language code KBK
- Karlsborgs BK, a bandy club in Sweden
- KBK Indian graphic news agency, Indian graphic news agency
- Keluarga Besar Purnawirawan, an Indonesian military veteran organization
- Kents Bank railway station, England; National Rail station code KBK
- Khamil Ghat railway station, India; Indian Railways station code KBK
- Klarenbeek railway station, Netherlands
- Køge BK, a football club in Denmark
- Kalahandi Balangir Koraput, a region in Orissa, India
- Kristiansund BK, a football club in Norway
- Kuurne–Brussels–Kuurne, a yearly bicycle race in Belgium
- Killer Be Killed, an American heavy metal band
- Karlstad BK, a Swedish football team
