= Digambar (disambiguation) =

Digambar or Digambara may refer to:

== People ==
- Digambar Kamat (1954), Indian politician
- Digambar Behera (1953), Indian physician
- Digambar Mitra (1817–1879), Sheriff of Kolkata
- Digambara Patra, Professor of Chemistry
- Digambara monk, Sādhu in Digambar tradition

== Organization ==
- Digambar Jain Mahasabha, Lay Jains organization

== Place ==
- Digambarpur, town in Chhireswornath
- Digambara, schools of Jainism

== Temple ==
- Digambara Jain temple, Khandagiri
- Digambara Jain Temple, Rourkela
