= Dumuriput =

- Village
- Location in Odisha, India Dumuriput (India)
- Coordinates: 18°49′03″N 82°43′08″E
- Country: India
- State: Odisha
- District: Koraput

Population (2011)
  - Total: 379

Languages
  - Official: Odia
- Time zone: UTC+5:30 (IST)
- PIN: 764021
- Telephone code: 06852
- Vehicle registration: OD-10
- Website: odisha.gov.in

Dumuriput is a small town located in between Koraput and Sunabeda by the side of NH-43. It comes under the tahasil of Sunabeda in Koraput district of the state Odisha, India.

== Demography ==
Situated about 69 km from the nearest town Nabarangpur, and 7 km from Sunabeda, it covers a geographical area of about 220.54 hectares. The population of the village, as per census 2011, is 379 out of which 189 are male and 190 are female.

== Tourism ==
In addition to the natural environment which surrounds the village, the kneeling Hanuman statues is another tourist attraction of the spot. The Sri Ram Temple situated at Dumuriput is widely known for the second highest kneeling Hanuman Statue in Odisha. Ram Navami festival is celebrated every year which attracts a large number of devotees. Nearest railway station is Dumuriput where Jagdalpur-BBSR Hirakhand Express stops.Vishakhapatnam-RGDA-Koraput Passenger DMU stops. There are views from the top.
