= Koraput Assembly constituency =

Constituency of the Odisha legislative assembly in India

Coordinates: 18.81°N 82.71°E

Koraput
- Constituency No. 144 for the Odisha Legislative Assembly

Constituency details
- Country: India
- Region: East India
- State: Odisha
- Division: Southern Division
- District: Koraput
- Lok Sabha constituency: Koraput
- Established: 1951
- Total electors: 1,92,486 (Note: as on 2024) (Note: as data published by election commission)
- Reservation: SC

Member of Legislative Assembly
- 17th Odisha Legislative Assembly
- Incumbent Raghuram Machha
- Party: Bharatiya Janata Party
- Elected year: 2024

Koraput is a Vidhan Sabha constituency of Koraput district, Odisha, India.

Map of Koraput Constituency

The constituency includes Koraput, Sunabeda Lamptaput block, 15 Gram panchayats (Badasuku, Deoghati, Kendar, Kerenga, Lankaput, Mahadeiput, Manbar, Mastiput, Padmapur and Umuri) of Koraput block and 8 Gram panchayats (Bodaput, Boipariguda, Chandrapada, Chipakur, Dasamanthapur, Doraguda, Kenduguda, Kollar and Mahuli) of Boipariguda block.

== Elected members ==
Vote share of winning candidates
| 2024 | 31.82% |
| 2019 | 35.19% |
| 2014 | 40.65% |
| 2009 | 34.97% |
| 2004 | 47.34% |
| 2000 | 55.80% |
| 1995 | 57.03% |
| 1990 | 55.74% |
| 1985 | 54.24% |
| 1980 | 47.54% |
| 1977 | 66.50% |

Since its formation in 1951, 15 elections were held till date.

List of members elected from Koraput constituency are:

| Year | Member | Party |
|---|---|---|
| 2024 | Raghuram Machha | Bharatiya Janata Party |
| 2019 | Raghuram Padal | Biju Janata Dal |
| 2014 | Krishna Chandra Sagaria | Indian National Congress |
| 2009 | Raghuram Padal | Biju Janata Dal |
| 2004 | Tara Prasad Bahinipati | Indian National Congress |
| 2000 | Tara Prasad Bahinipati | Indian National Congress |
| 1995 | Gupta Prasad Das | Indian National Congress |
| 1990 | Harish Chandra Buxipatra | Janata Dal |
| 1985 | Nrushinha Nanda Brahma | Indian National Congress |
| 1980 | Nrushinha Nanda Brahma | Indian National Congress (I) |
| 1977 | Harish Chandra Buxipatra | Janata Party |
| 1974 | Harish Chandra Buxipatra | Utkal Congress |
1967-1971 : Constituency did not exist
| 1961 | Toyaka Sangana | Indian National Congress |
| 1957 | Laxmana Pujari | Ganatantra Parishad |
| 1951 | Ganga Muduli | Ganatantra Parishad |

== Election results ==
=== 2024 ===
Voting were held on 13 May 2024 in 1st phase of Odisha Assembly Election & 4th phase of Indian General Election. Counting of votes was on 4 June 2024. In 2024 election, Bharatiya Janata Party candidate Raghuram Machha defeated Biju Janata Dal candidate Raghuram Padal by a margin of 2,524 votes.

2024 Odisha Vidhan Sabha Election: Koraput
| Party | Candidate | Votes | % | ±% |
|---|---|---|---|---|
| BJP | Raghuram Machha | 46,805 | 31.82 | ▲6.45 |
| BJD | Raghuram Padal | 44,281 | 30.11 | ▼5.06 |
| INC | Krushna Kuldip | 42,256 | 28.73 | ▼1.86 |
| NOTA | None of the above | 3,263 | 2.22 | ▼0.14 |
| Majority | | 2,524 | 1.71 | ▼2.89 |
| Turnout | | 1,47,073 | 76.41 | ▲4.45 |
| BJP gain from BJD | | | | |

=== 2019 ===
In 2019 election, Biju Janata Dal candidate Raghuram Padal defeated Indian National Congress candidate Krushna Kuldip by a margin of 6,285 votes.

2019 Odisha Vidhan Sabha Election: Koraput
| Party | Candidate | Votes | % | ±% |
|---|---|---|---|---|
| BJD | Raghuram Padal | 48,171 | 35.19 | − |
| INC | Krushna Kuldip | 41,886 | 30.59 | − |
| BJP | Tripurary Gorada | 33,994 | 24.83 | − |
| NOTA | None of the above | 3,235 | 2.36 | − |
| Majority | | 6,285 | 4.60 | − |
| Turnout | | 1,36,905 | 71.96 | − |
| BJD gain from INC | | | | |

=== 2014 ===
In 2014 election, Indian National Congress candidate Krushna Chandra Sagaria defeated Biju Janata Dal candidate Raghuram Machha by a margin of 4,976 votes.

2014 Odisha Vidhan Sabha Election: Koraput
| Party | Candidate | Votes | % | ±% |
|---|---|---|---|---|
| INC | Krushna Chandra Sagaria | 50,672 | 40.65 | ▲6.85 |
| BJD | Raghuram Machha | 45,696 | 36.66 | ▲1.69 |
| BJP | Jairam Garada | 13,665 | 10.96 | ▲1.58 |
| NOTA | None of the above | 2,204 | 1.77 | − |
| Majority | | 4,976 | 3.99 | ▲2.82 |
| Turnout | | 1,24,662 | 74.92 | ▲16.15 |
| Registered electors | | 1,66,404 | | |
| INC gain from BJD | | | | |

=== 2009 ===
In the 2009 election, Biju Janata Dal candidate Raghuram Padal defeated Indian National Congress candidate Krishna Chandra Sagaria by a margin of 1,114 votes.

2009 Odisha Vidhan Sabha Election: Koraput
| Party | Candidate | Votes | % | ±% |
|---|---|---|---|---|
| BJD | Raghuram Padal | 33,235 | 34.97 | ▲3.34 |
| INC | Krishna Chandra Sagaria | 32,121 | 33.80 | ▲13.54 |
| BJP | Jayaram Garda | 8,917 | 9.38 | − |
| Majority | | 1,114 | 1.17 (Note: % of total valid votes) | − |
| Turnout | | 95,083 | 58.77 (Note: 2004 voter turnout was 62.56%) | ▼3.79 |
| BJD gain from INC | | | | |
