= Barlamunda =

- Village
- Location in Odisha, India
- Coordinates: 18.615013°N 82.820435°E
- Country: India
- State: Odisha
- District: Koraput

Languages
  - Official: Odia
- Time zone: UTC+5:30 (IST)
- Vehicle registration: OD 10

Barlamunda is a tribal village in Koraput district, Odisha, India. It has no electricity, running water or road access, despite being promised rudimentary facilities (beginning with a road) under the National Rural Employment Guarantee Scheme.
