= Central Tool Room and Training Centre, Bhubaneswar =

Indian government agency

Central Tool Room and Training Centre Bhubaneswar
- Central Tool Room and Training Centre (Bhubaneswar) logo
- Established: 1992
- General Manager I/C.: L.Rajasekhar
- Location: Bhubaneswar, Odisha, India
- Coordinates: 20.343774°N 85.808194°E
- Interactive map of Central Tool Room and Training Centre; Bhubaneswar
- Website: www.cttc.gov.in

Central Tool Room and Training Centre, located in Bhubaneswar, is an autonomous body under the Ministry of Micro, Small and Medium Enterprises, Government of India. In addition to imparting technical training for the skill development of technical staff as well as students in the engineering and technical fields, the institute strives to foster the progress of micro, small and medium enterprises in the country and to facilitate the development of the youth.

Central Tool Room and Training Centre at 9th Bengaluru Space Expo 2026, BIEC

== History ==
In the era of rapid industrialization particularly in the engineering field, requirements of specialized tools, dies, jigs, fixtures, moulds, gauges & other precision components are indispensable. Simultaneously demand for high quality toolmakers are also growing rapidly. Central Tool Room & Training Centre, Bhubaneswar has been established under Technical cooperation program between Government of India and Government of Denmark as a Government of India Society registered under Society Registration Act, XXI, 1860. All the infrastructural facilities like land, building etc. have been contributed by Government of Odisha. Training activities started in 1991 and Tool production in 1995.

== Services ==
- Developing production facilities of moulds, jigs, fixtures, gauges and other sophisticated components especially for small scale industries.
- Conducting long and short-term training programmes in the field of tool making and other allied engineering trades both for the freshers and for personnel already engaged in this field.
- Providing common facilities in precision machining and heat treatment.
- Providing consultancy facilities primarily for small scale industries in the field of tool engineering aimed at improvement in quality and productivity.
- Provided essential components for ISRO missions like Mars Orbiter Mission, Chandraayaan-1, Chandraayaan-2 & Chandrayaan-3.
- Manufactured components of COVID-19 testing kit for AMTZ
- Signed a memorandum of understanding with Tata Steel to enhance employee skills at its Kalinganagar plant
- Conducted training programme for international trainees
- Incubated various startups
- Developed a low cost ambu bag ventilator for COVID-19 pandemic

== Extension Centers ==
The campus has extension centers at Rayagada, Kalinganagar, Durg & Berhampur. Another Central Tool Room and Training Centre is upcoming at Rourkela and demand has been made for one at Angul.
