= Sunabeda =

- Town
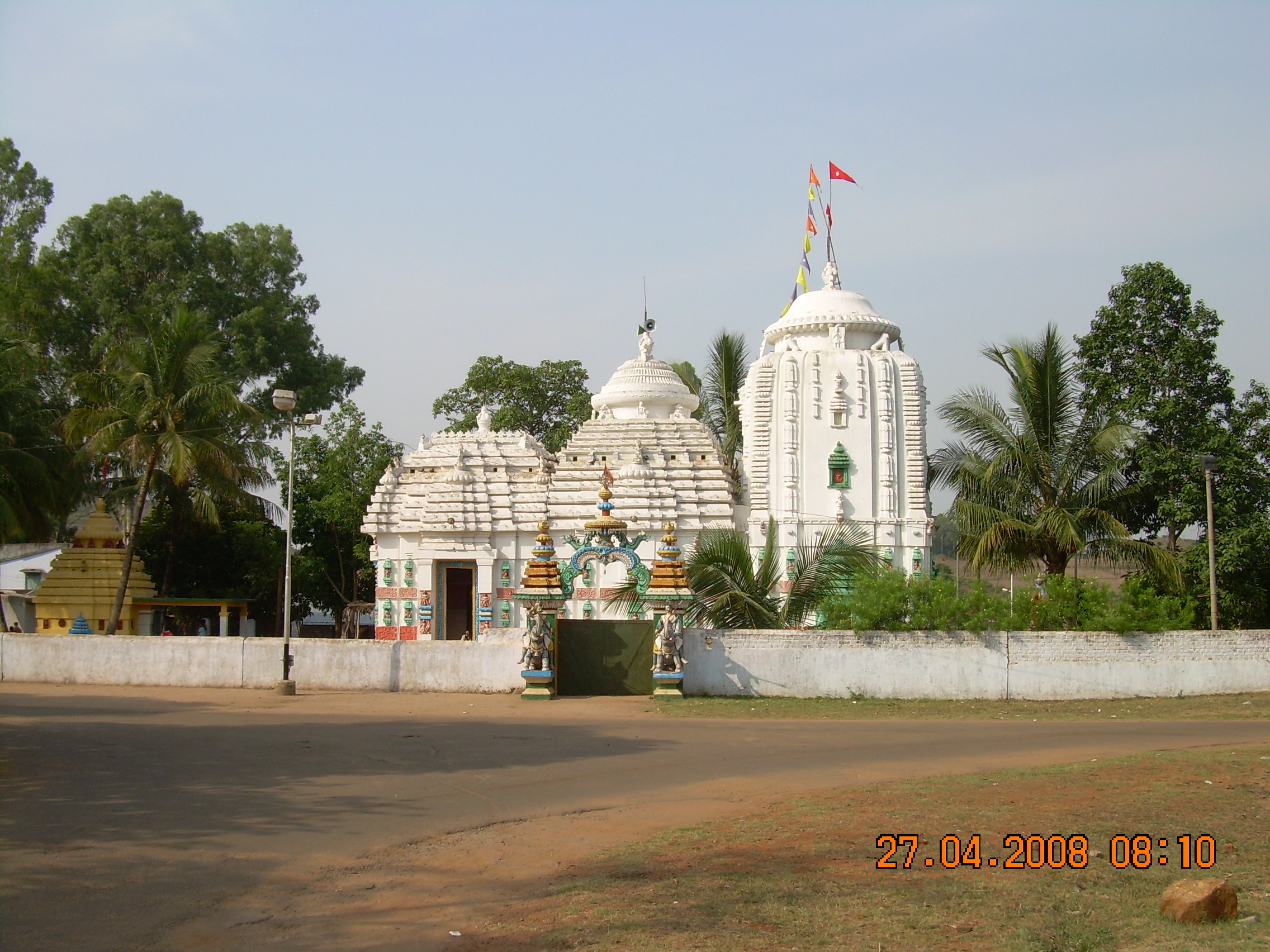
- Jagganath Temple in Sunabeda

- Location within Odisha Location within India
- Coordinates: 18.73°N 82.83°E
- Country: India
- State: Odisha
- District: Koraput

Population (2001)
  - Total: 58,647

Languages
  - Official: Odia
- Time zone: UTC+5:30 (IST)
- PIN: 763001,763002,763003
- Telephone code: 06853
- Vehicle registration: OD-10
- Website: odisha.gov.in

Sunabeda is an industrial town and a municipality in the state of Odisha, India, located in the valleys of the Koraput region. The Engine division and Sukhoi division of the aircraft manufacturing company Hindustan Aeronautics Limited (HAL), a public sector undertaking (PSU) of Ministry of Defence, which manufactures the Saturn AL-31 engines for the Sukhoi Su-30MKI Flanker fighter jet fleet of the Indian Air Force, is in Sunabeda.

Other major establishments of this town are Naval Armament Depot (NAD), State government offices, Sports Authority of India hostel, Central University of Orissa (CUO) and Battalion headquarter of Commando Battalion for Resolute Action (CoBRA).

== History ==
Created around 1965, mainly to accommodate HAL employees, Sunabeda is a planned and organized township. It is situated around 1,000 meters above sea level. Prior to its creation, this place was known as Old Sunabeda which was occupied by native tribal community. About a thousand tribals in and around Chikapar village were displaced and rendered homeless to give way for the HAL factory. Even though the factory was made with Russian collaboration, the township and factory buildings were executed by state engineers of Odisha. The project was named Aero Engine Factory (AEF) Project. The residential colony is called AEF Colony with a chief engineer responsible towards it.

After the 1971 Indo-Pakistani War a shelter camp for the Bangladeshi refugees was constructed which became Sunabeda–3, which today predominantly comprises Bengali Hindu people. The Odisha Small Industries Corporation established the Odisha Timber and Engineering Works adjacent to NH-43. Most Bengali people joined here as carpenters. When the Kolab dam was constructed a catchment formed around Sunabeda in the form of a big lake. Some of the Bengali people took to fishing and today Sunabeda is a centre for making fishing boats and nets for which fishermen from as far as Malkangiri come to buy their provisions.

There was little growth in Sunabeda and on the other hand the hustle and bustle gradually started dwindling as the AEF project closed after commencement of production in HAL. Similarly fresh recruitment in HAL stopped after a while and people started retiring and the post remained vacant as the Mikoyan (MIG) series of aircraft was losing out to new series of aircraft.

In the late 1980s the setting up of the NAD and the National Aluminium Company (NALCO) in Damanjodi kept the overall situation alive in Sunabeda and Semiliguda. Things started looking brighter after the Sukhoi Su-30 production meant a new division in HAL. The arrival of the battalion headquarters of Central Reserve Police Force (CRPF) Commando Battalion for Resolute Action (COBRA), as well as the Central University and the Indira Gandhi National Open University (IGNOU) are hoped to provide some growth to the area.

== Geography ==
=== Location ===
Sunabeda is located 20 km east of Koraput. There are frequent buses and taxis from Koraput. Though the closest railway station is at Dumuriput, Damanjodi and Koraput, a majority of the people prefer alighting at Vizianagaram in Andhra Pradesh. The National Highway 26 (previously NH-43) running over the mountains and forest make the journey to Sunabeda an unforgettable experience.

There are basically three areas in Sunabeda defined as Sunabeda - I, II, III, these being AEF Colony, the H A L township and the N A C (notified area council) respectively. They are so called because of the last digit in the PINCODE.

With green flora all around the hills and hillocks, Sunabeda has places open to sightseeing, such as the HAL Nursery. There is also a deer park adjoining the nursery. A museum on the outskirts of the township is to house the developmental history of the place as well as the factory.

=== HAL Township ===
Sunabeda is a well planned township with adjoining areas like PHED Colony, AEF Colony, Shantinagar, NAC, Semliguda, D.P. Camp, Jadaguda, Malliguda, Jersey Farm, Timber, and Damanjodi. Moreover, many of hill stations and water falls surrounded near by. The HAL factory is located in the center of the town, employees around six thousand people, and provides residential quarters for the employees and staff of the company. The entire township is divided into seven sectors which are further divided into zones starting from A to Y, the 'R' zone being the largest. There are other zones listed as R, RA, QA, LA, N, G, UA, JA, IB, KA, G, S, M, A, B, C, D, E, F, H, P, T, Y.

== Demographics ==
As of 2001 India census, Sunabeda had a population of 58,647. Males constitute 52% of the population and females 48%. Sunabeda has an average literacy rate of 62%, higher than the national average of 59.5%: male literacy is 69%, and female literacy is 54%. In Sunabeda, 12% of the population is under 6 years of age.

== Education ==
The oldest school but relatively less known is the Government High School at Sunabeda-1 which has one alumni Sri Jayaram Pangi as a Member of Parliament. Most educated people in the old parts of the town are likely to be products of this elite school belonging to the T&R Department.

In order to provide continual and quality education to transferable central government employees comprising serving Officers and sailors of Indian Navy, Navy civilians and counterparts from Army and Airforce of Sunabeda along with retired authorised personnel and few local populace, NAD KV Sunabeda has been established in the year 1989 (from class -1 to class-V) and to presently class-12 has been functioning satisfactorily under the aegis of KV Sangathan with students hailing from far off places like Koraput, Damanjodi etc.

For employees of Hindustan Aeronautics Limited (HAL) factory, Aeronautics Education Society (AES) established a co-educational English medium School in year 1968, Vyomayana Samstha Vidyalaya(VSV) formerly called the DAV English Medium School with classes from LKG - Std XII. It's located at the edge of township near the Utkal Cinema hall. It has 3 buildings - Primary which has LKG to Std 5 students, Secondary for class 6 to 8 students and the main building for 9th to class 12th. All board exams 10th and 12th are held on premises and is affiliated to board of Secondary education with CBSE course studies. Alumnus of VSV work in top positions at global companies both in India and abroad. Bibhuti Acharya, the Vice President of Apollo Medvarsity is an alumnus of V.S.Vidyalaya.

The only missionary school, Jeevan Jyothi convent school is situated at Semiliguda 5 km from Sunabeda. There is also the Sunabeda Public School (ICSE) in the A.E.F. Colony. The Sunabeda Public School founded in 1965 is the oldest English-medium school in the erstwhile undivided Koraput district . It is a co-educational residential school having classes from LKG to Class XII. Ambassador Dinesh_K._Patnaik is an alumnus of Sunabeda Public School. The other schools are A.G.H. School, and A.D.A.V. School. The primary schools are: A Zone School, D Zone School, R Zone School, U Zone School and I Zone School.

For the development of women's education in Sunabeda there is women's college named as Sunabeda Women's College. Aurobindo Integral School, and Saraswati Vidya Mandir (founded in 1985) were also established for the development of education in the NAC area. Saaraswati Vidya Mandir is an Oriya medium school, affiliated to board of secondary education, Bhubaneswar.

== Transport ==
Sunabeda is situated on NH 26 which connects Raipur and Bargarh. The nearest railway stations are:

- Dumuriput, 6 km
- Koraput, 19 km
- Damanjodi, 12 km

The nearest airport is in Visakhapatnam in Andhra Pradesh (188 km).

Sunabeda is well connected with rest of Odisha as well as nearby districts of Andhra Pradesh and Chhattisgarh with huge number of buses. Recently Jeypore - Koraput - Sunabeda City Bus Service has been started and it caters well to the transportation needs of Sunabedians.

== Distance from major cities and surrounding towns ==
- Jeypore 43 km
- Koraput 19 km
- Semiliguda 3 km
- Sunki 48 km
- Saluru 71 km
- Visakhapatnam 196 km
- Vizianagaram 127 km
- Bhubaneswar 484 km
- Brahmapur 313 km
- Asika 316 km
- Bhanjanagar 367 km
- Cuttack 510 km
- Phulbani 332 km
- Rourkela 607 km
- Rayagada 109 km

== Sports ==
There is big stadium in middle of the Township. Many Divisional events are observed in this stadium. Independence Day and Republic Days are celebrated in a grand way. Hockey, Football, Cricket and other athletic meets are held in this stadium. National level football tournament are organised in this ground in every two years. Teams from different parts of our Country are participating in this tournament.

There is also Sports club at HAL Township. Apart from it, Sunabeda has a Sports training center which is run by HAL in collaboration with Sports Authority of India. The training center primarily trains students of age group 13–15 years old. Candidates are selected from adjourning districts of Koraput. Trainees of this centre have participated at National level championship in Archery and brought laurels for the State.

== Culture ==
Sunabeda has a very old Jagannath Temple, older than Koraput Jagannath temple, which holds an annual Rath Yatra that ends at HAL Open Air Pandal. This event is an important annual event in Sunabeda. Maa Banadurga temple at Shantinagar is the oldest temple of the Region, where the tribals celebrate their annual Chaita Parba, the oldest annual event of the entire Sunabeda region.

The major cultural events in Sunabeda are the Rath Yatra, the Viswakarma Puja, Dussehra and other festivals. There is a Jagannath temple in AEF Colony and L zone in HAL Township. Maha Sivaratri which is celebrated at the temple of Shiva atop a hillock just close to the AEF Colony bus stop, There is a Hanuman Temple in IB zone. There is also a Jagannath Temple at L-Zone named as Swarnakhetra, Tarini Temple at B-Zone, Mangala Temple at R-Zone and K-Zone, Gayatri Temple at G-zone, Santosimaa Temple at E-Zone, Satyasai Temple at F-zone and many more temple at HAL Township for the spiritual development of the people of the township. In the boundary of Jagannath Temple there is a Siva Temple where Baba Biswanath worshiped. Besides Siva and Jagannath there is also Ganesh Mandir and Laxmi Mandir. Arnapurna Mandap and Laxmi Mandap also constructed in the boundary of Jagannath Temple for social functions of the Township. At an extreme of the township, there exists a hill called Chikkappara. On the hill top is the oldest temple - " Lord Siva Temple" and Parvathi Temple at the bottom of the hill. By the side of the temple Lord Ayyaappa Temple is there, which was consecrated on 15 February 1989.

== Literature ==
Every Year on the occasion of Ratha Yatra a colourful magazine is published called Swarnakhetra. Utkal Sanskrutika Parishad of Sunabeda is one of the oldest cultural Organization of Odisha in the township which is continuously playing a vital Role for the Development of the Odia Culture, Literature and Customs since 1966. The organization observes the Jayanti of Kabisamrat Upendrabhanja, Fakirmohan, Gangadhar, Madhusudan, Bijupatnaik, Nanda Kishore Bal. The organization also publishes an annual magazine called Smaranika. The Banaphula Sahitya Parishad and The Banaprabha Sahitya Sansad are two other organizations that are continuously working for the development of Odia literature.
