= Kalahandi Balangir Koraput Region =

Coordinates: 19.423958°N 82.903827°E

Kalahandi Balangir Koraput Region is a region in Odisha, India.

The districts of Southern and Western Odisha are regarded as the most backward region by the planning commission, which re-designated some of these districts as KBK (Kalahandi-Balangir-Koraput). During 1992–93, the three larger districts were re-organized into eight districts viz. Malkangiri, Koraput, Nabrangpur, Kalahandi, Rayagada, Nuapada, Balangir and Sonepur. These eight districts comprise 14 Subdivisions, 37 Tehsils, 80 CD Blocks, 1,437 Gram Panchayats and 12,293 villages. The eight districts which form the KBK region account for 19.72% of the population and 30.59% geographical area of the State. Around 90% of the people of this region still live in villages. Female literacy is only 24.72%. As per the 1997 census of BPL families, about 72% of the families residing here are below poverty line, compared to 82% per the 1992 census. More specifically, 49 CD Blocks of KBK districts are regarded as "very backward" and 28 CD blocks as "backward". Persistent crop failure, lack of access to basic services, starvation, malnutrition and migration are the leading manifestations in the region.

Other socio-economic indicators including population composition and density, net area irrigated, hospital beds, and connectivity of villages (due to criss-crossed terrains) to growth centres and service centres are also far from satisfactory.

The KBK districts have been historically rich in forest resources. Though the people have been using these forests very intensively and eking out their livelihood from this source, forests of this region have not received adequate investments and managerial inputs over time. Intensive use of forests for sustenance coupled with lack of insufficient investments and managerial inputs are, thus, continuously leading to forest degradation. Although one third (16,131 km^{2}.) of the geographical area of this region is recorded as forests, only 11.3% (5,473 km^{2}) is actually dense forest (i.e., with crown density over 40%) as per satellite imagery data. It has been further ascertained that 9% (4,332 km^{2}.) forest area is completely devoid of vegetal cover. Another 13.5% (6,327 km^{2}) forests are open having crown density more than 10% but less than 40%.

The old Koraput and Kalahandi districts and portions of Bolangir districts are mainly hilly. Severe droughts and floods also often visit this region and some areas in quick succession. Therefore, backwardness of this region is multi-faceted: (i) tribal backwardness, (ii) hill area backwardness, (iii) backwardness due to severe natural calamities and (iv)apathy of state and central government towards this region.
