= Reba Ray =

Odia poet

- Born: 1876
- Died: 7 August 1957 (aged 80–81)
- Occupations: Educationist, Poet
- Writing career
- Language: Odia
- Notable work: Anjali

Reba Ray (1876 – 1957) was an Indian Odia poet educationist and administrator. Best known as one of the earliest Odia women writers, she was also founder of Model Girls' School, Cuttack. Her short story Sanyasi is considered earliest modern Odia short story by a woman writer. She was niece of renowned Odia poet Madhusudan Rao.

== Personal life ==
She was born on 1857. Many of her early life details are not known. She was married to well known writer Sadhu Charan Ray.

== Career ==
She was one of the pioneers for women's education. She established Model Girls' School at Cuttack in 1906. It had provision for teaching music and sewing. She founded a woman's magazine Asha in 1892. She also founded Odisha's first children's magazine Prabhat. Her stories were published in Utkal Sahitya magazine as well. She set up another school at Guhali, Jajpur.

== Published works ==
- Anjali, 1903
- Shakuntala, 1904
