= KBK Indian graphic news agency =

KBK is an Indian graphic news agency founded by Kul Bushan Kumar (1928–2003), from whom it got its name. It is considered "the vanguard of cartography and graphic journalism in India".

KBK was founded in the early 1950s, and its founder Kul Bushan Kumar had a postgraduate degree in geography. Kumar noticed that newspapers and journals then often carried inaccurate geographic representations. He is said to have prepared detailed maps during the India-China War of 1962, leading editor M. Chalapathi Rau to write that only he "could provide a correct picture of the war".
