= Central University of Odisha =

Public university in Odisha, India

- University Logo
- Other name: CUO
- Motto: CUO for Nation Building
- Type: Central University
- Established: 2009; 17 years ago
- Accreditation: NAAC (A+)
- Academic affiliations: UGC; AIU
- Chancellor: P. V. Krishna Bhatta
- Vice-Chancellor: Dr. Ajit Kumar Shasany
- Visitor: President of India
- Faculty: 86
- Students: 1600+
- Undergraduates: 854
- Postgraduates: 509
- Doctoral students: 124
- Location: Koraput, Odisha, India; 18°44′15″N 82°48′28″E
- Campus: Rural 450 acres (1.8 km^{2})
- Website: cuo.ac.in

Central University of Odisha (CUO), formerly Central University of Orissa, was established by parliament under the Central Universities Act, 2009 (No. 3C of 2009) by Government of India, situated at Sunabeda Town, Koraput District in the Indian state of Odisha. The territorial jurisdiction of the university is whole of the Odisha state.

== History ==
The university was established in 2009 as Central University of Orissa, by parliament under the Central Universities Act. It is one of 20 new Central Universities established by the Government of India during the UGC XI Plan period to address the concerns of "equity and access" and as per the policy of the Government of India to increase the access to quality higher education by people in less educationally developed districts which have a Graduate Enrollment Ratio of less than the national average of 11%. It has its jurisdiction over entire state of Orissa.

Prof. (Dr.) Surabhi Banerjee was the first and founding Vice Chancellor of the university.

In August 2019 it was renamed Central University of Odisha through the Central Universities (Amendment) Act, 2019.

== Campus ==
The site is located in village Chikapar and Chakarliput coming under Sunabeda NAC (Urban area). It is close to Hindustan Aeronautics Limited (HAL), Sunabeda. A road constructed over the acquired land of Indian Navy for the purposes of the Naval Armament Depot joins the proposed site from N.H. 43 at the point of Sunabeda Junction-1 (about 6 km). From Sunabeda-1 Junction, the railway stations of Dumuriput, Damanjodi and Koraput are 5 km, 15 km and 25 km away, respectively. The land size is 450 acres spreading over village Chikapar (Ac. 310.96) and the adjoining Chakarliput (Ac. 139.13).

== Organisation and administration ==
=== School and Department ===
School of Languages

- Department of Odia Language & Literature (DOLL)
- Department of English Language & Literature (DELL)
- Department of Hindi (DH)
- Department of Sanskrit (DSkt)

School of Social Sciences

- Department of Anthropology (DA)
- Department of Economics (DE)
- Department of Sociology (DS)

School of Education & Education Technology

- Department of Journalism & Mass Communication (DJMC)
- Department of Education (DEDN)

School of Basic Sciences & Information Sciences

- Department of Computer Science (DCS)
- Department of Mathematics (DM)

School of Commerce and Management

- Department of Business Management (DBM) -

School of Biodiversity & Conservation of Natural Resources

- Department of Biodiversity & Conservation of Natural Resources (DBCNR)

School of Applied Science

- Department of Statistics (DSTAT)

School Of Integrated Agriculture And Natural Resources

- Department of Agriculture(DAG)
- Department of Forestry(DF)
- Department of Diary Science(DDS)

School of Life Science

- Department of Botany
- Department of Zoology

== Facilities ==
=== Central library ===
Following the formal establishment of the Central Library in 2009, priority was given to developing a comprehensive collection of textbooks and reference materials. In addition to its print collection of more than 38,531 volumes, the library provides access to popular magazines, selected academic journals, theses, reports, e-books, electronic journals, and online databases covering the sciences, humanities, and social sciences.

During the 2011–2012 academic year, the library made considerable progress in its acquisition activities by appointing 16 vendors to supply books and journals. It also expanded its digital collection through subscriptions to more than 8,000 electronic resources, including full-text and bibliographic databases. These developments helped establish the Central Library as a round-the-clock information resource on the CUO campus at Landiguda.

=== Computer Centre ===
The Central University of Odisha has made arrangements for net connectivity through BSNL broad-band services. About 30 terminals/portals are put into service of the residents and teachers. This service would enhance the interactive, communicative and knowledge addition at Central University of Odisha.

== Student life ==
=== Hostel ===
The Boys' and Girls' hostel in the University campus provide state of art infrastructure along with hygienic mess facilities. The hostel's are (G+3) of 7,735 sq. mtr. (Plinth area) having 236 rooms, of 105 square ft each.

=== Guest House ===
The Guest House in the University campus provides state of art infrastructure. It is (G+3) of 2,957 sq. mtr. (Plinth area) having with 32 rooms and 08 suits with the provision of lift. It is located in sylvan surrounding and has a banquet hall, a conference hall, lobby, dining hall and rooms of different categories.
