= Koraput =

- Hill station
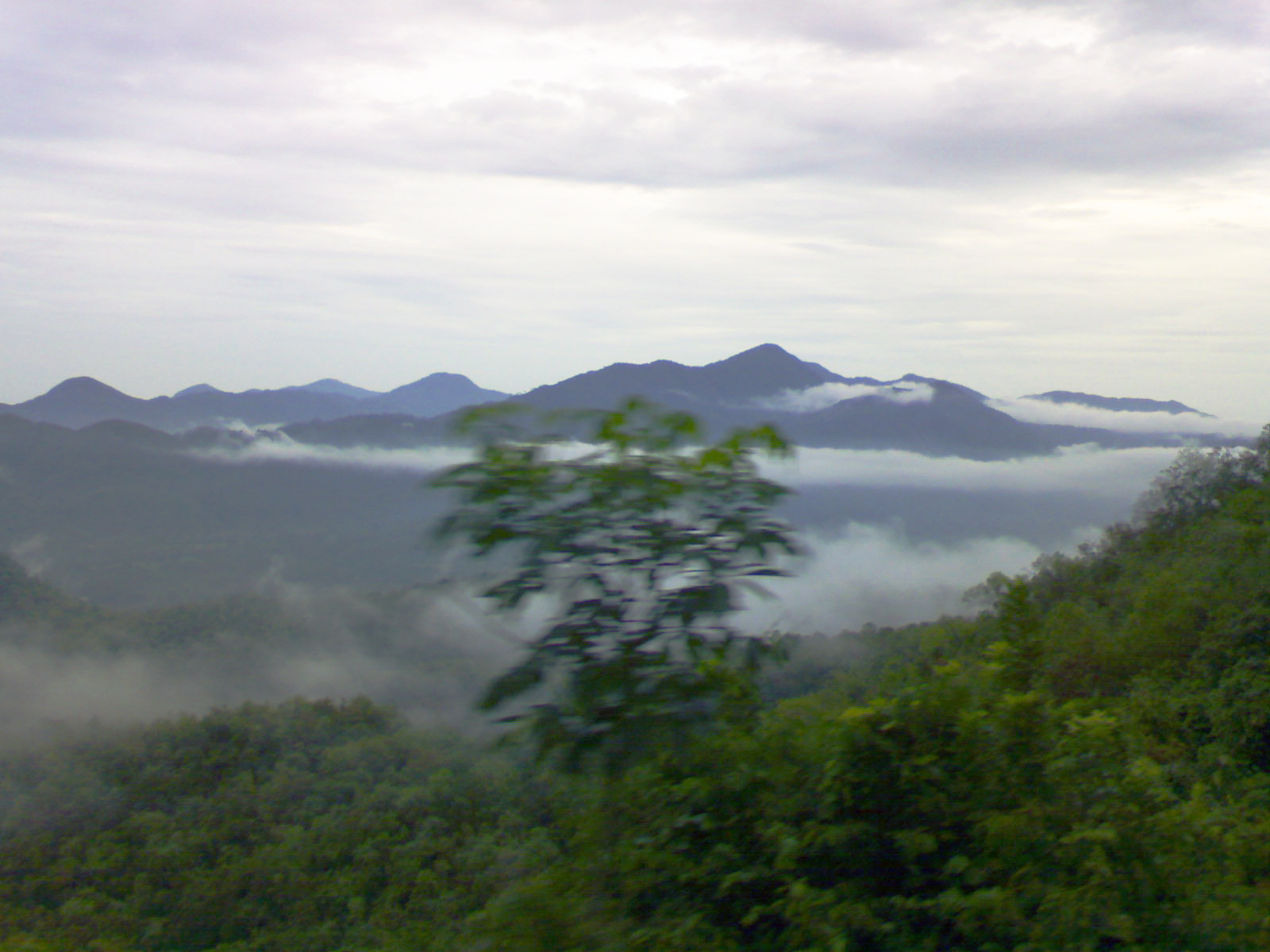
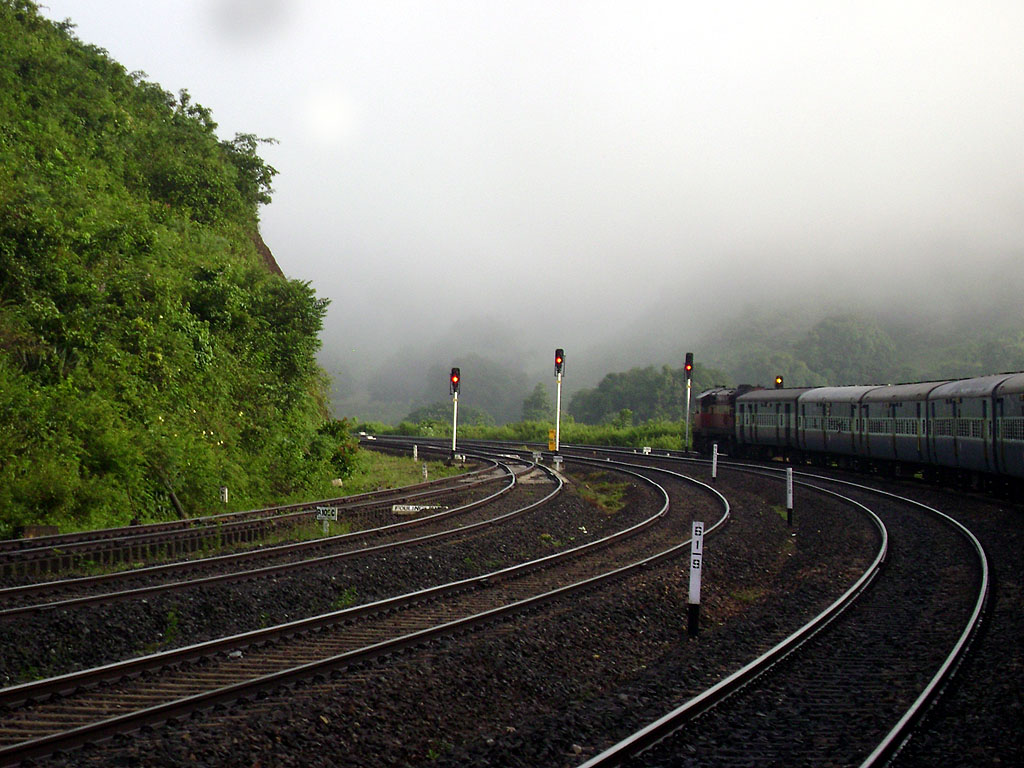
- Deomali Mountain range Rail Tracks in Koraput
- Nicknames: Switzerland of Odisha, Emerald Highlands of Odisha, Aero Engine Capital of India
- Location in Odisha, India Koraput (India)
- Coordinates: 18.8561°N 82.7347°E
- Country: India
- State: Odisha
- District: Koraput

Government
  - Type: Municipality
  - Body: Koraput Municipality
  - Member of Parliament: Saptagiri Ulaka (INC)
  - Member of Legislative Assembly: Raghuram Machha(BJP)

Area
  - Total: 104.97 km^{2} (40.53 sq mi)
- Elevation: 890 m (2,920 ft)

Population (2022)
  - Total: 156,716
  - Rank: 273th
  - Density: 1,493.0/km^{2} (3,866.7/sq mi)
- Demonym: Koraputia

Languages
  - Official: Odia
- Time zone: UTC+5:30 (IST)
- PIN: 764020,764021,764022
- Telephone code: 06852
- Vehicle registration: OD 10
- Website: koraputmunicipality.in

Koraput is a town and a Municipality in Koraput district in the Indian state of Odisha. Koraput town is the district headquarter of Koraput district.

== History ==
The district of Koraput derives its name from its headquarters in the present town of Koraput. In ancient times when the Nalas were ruling over this tract, Pushkari near modern Umarkot was the capital city. In the medieval period, Nandapur developed as a little kingdom under the Silavamsi kings that were later expanded by the Suryavanshi kings who arrived in the region in the 13th century from Kashmir. Later, Maharajah Veer Vikram Dev shifted his capital to Jeypore and about the middle of the 17th century, this town prospered under the British Administration. Koraput was chosen by the British in 1870 for better health prospects. The origin of the name Koraput is obscure. There are several theories, none of which are convincing.

According to Mr R.C.S.Bell the name of the town is ‘Kora-Putti’ or "the hamlet of the nux-vomica" and it is derived presumably from a tree or trees that must at one time have been prominent near the site. But today not a single tree of nux-vomica is to be found near about the town of Koraput and so the assumption of Miss Anshika is open to question.

According to the second theory, Koraput is a corrupted form of ‘Karaka pentho’ Karaka literally means ‘hail-stone’. It is also believed that one ‘Khora Naiko’ laid the foundation of the village during the time of the Nandapur kings. He hailed probably from Ranpur and served under the Nandapur kings in the Militia, and for his faithful and meritorious services he has permitted to establish this village which was named after him as Khora Putu, and later on, the name has been abbreviated to ‘Koraput’.

Koraput also attracts tourism as the town is surrounded by mountains, thick forests, waterfalls and also has many old temples.

Over the past two years, approximately 220 residents of Bondaguda village in Similiguda block have stopped practicing open defecation. The village's 45 households have constructed toilets at their homes.

== Adivasi communities ==
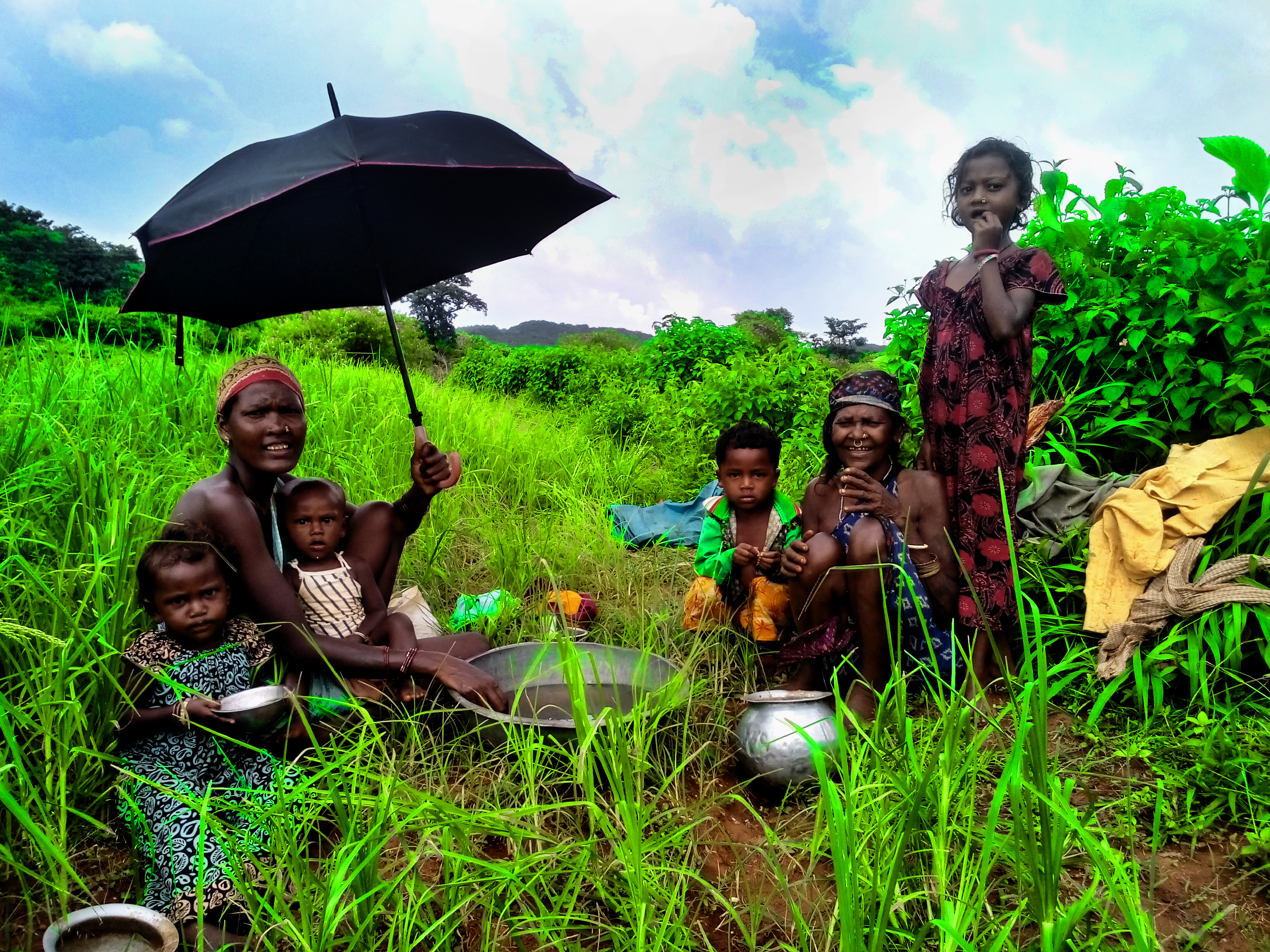
Tribal people of Koraput, Odisha

Koraput is a part of the tribal belt in southern Odisha. As the term 'tribal' often denotes a negative connotation, the indigenous people here prefer to be known as Adivasis, i.e. "original inhabitants". Many different Adivasi communities live in this district.

The traditional culture (including languages), knowledge and subsistence of the Adivasis are closely connected with local ecosystems.

Most of the area was covered by thick forest until relatively recently. As a result of deforestation, industrialization and urbanization, many Adivasi communities have adopted new ways of life. However, many Adivasis maintain a tradition of selling produce (vegetables and fruit) in Sunday markets popularly known as Hat Poda (or haat).

The Dongar Festival (or Parab) is held annually, ostensibly to showcase the way of life of Adivasis, in the first and second weeks of December, organised by the district administration. Many foreign tourists visit the festival. There has been criticism of the festival, with allegations that Adivasis are reluctant participants, who are paraded like "museum specimens" for the benefit of the tourism industry.

=== Sabara Srikhetra (Jagannath Temple) ===
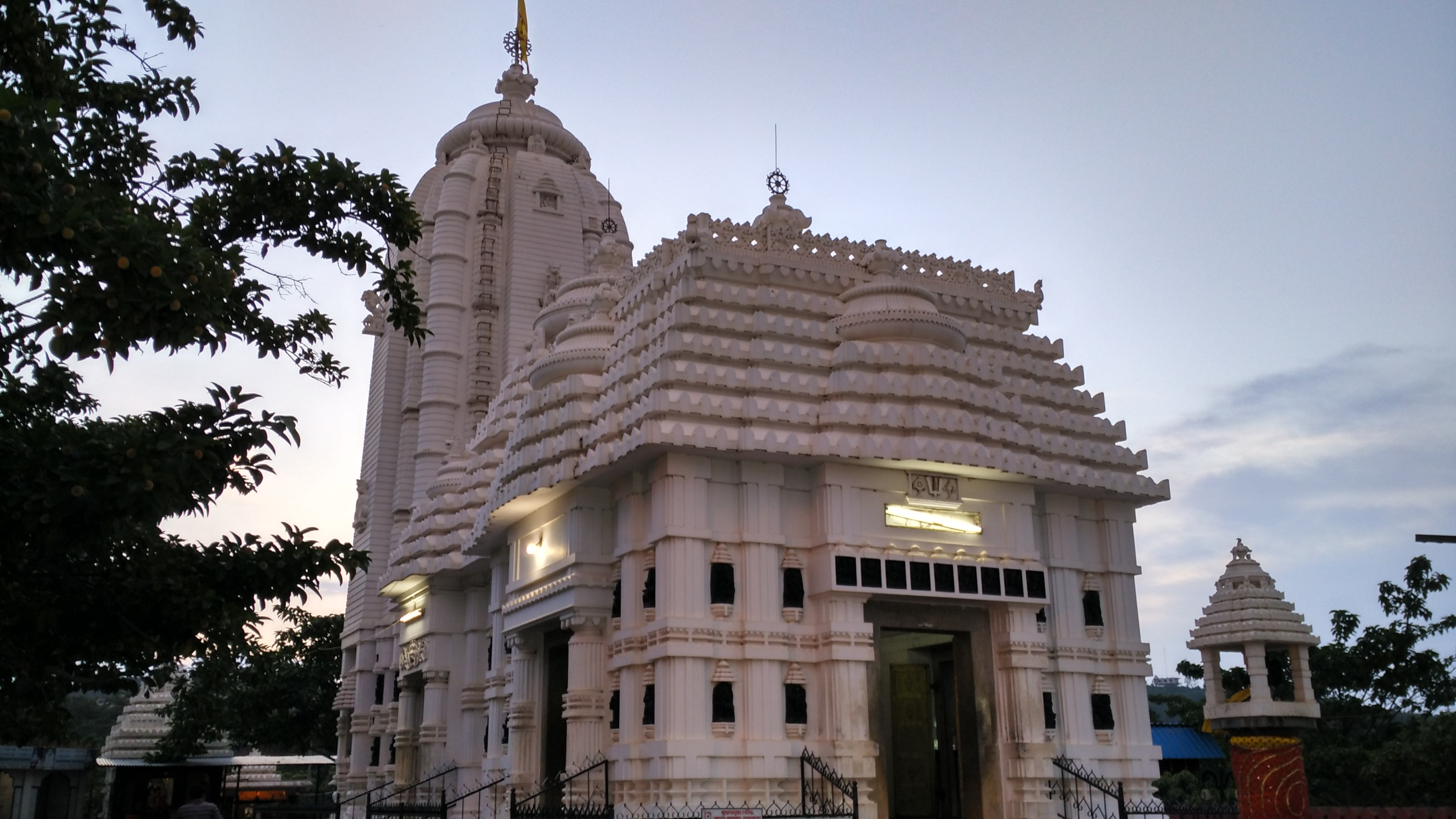
Jagannath temple in Koraput

Koraput is mostly famous for its Jagannath Temple which is also known as Sabara Srikhetra. Srikhetra is normally referred to as Puri Jagannath, but the unique identity of the Koraput temple is because no section of society is barred entry.

Council of Analytical Tribal Studies (COATS), registered under the Societies Registration Act 1860, a university–like educational institute, is a successful attempt to restore and educate tribal way of life, customs, tradition, medicine, language, social structure and history. COATS has been documenting the day-today situation of poor tribal people and feeding this information to the local administration in an effort to make it more efficient.

== Geography ==
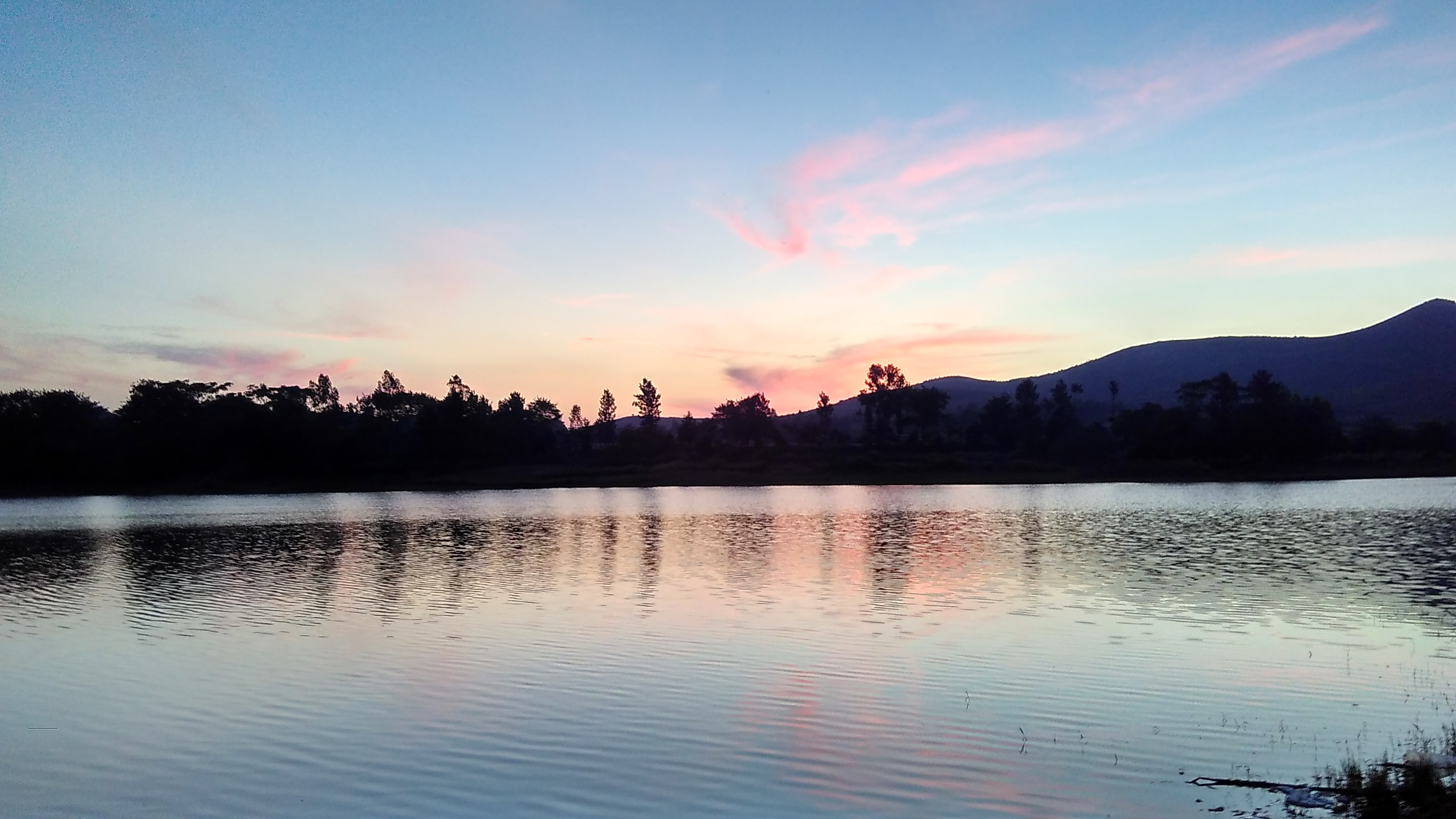
Kechala lake in Koraput

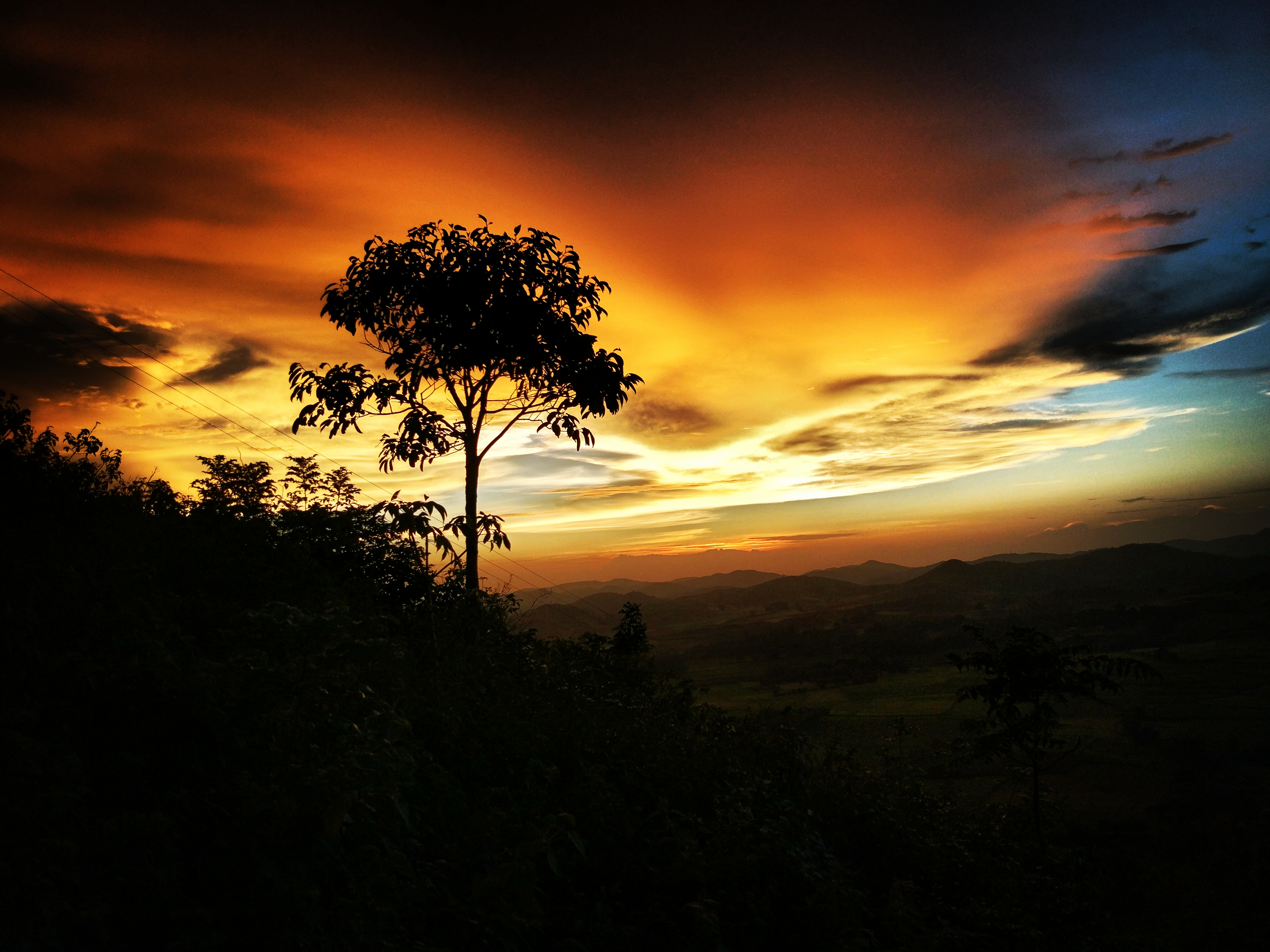
Table mountain Koraput

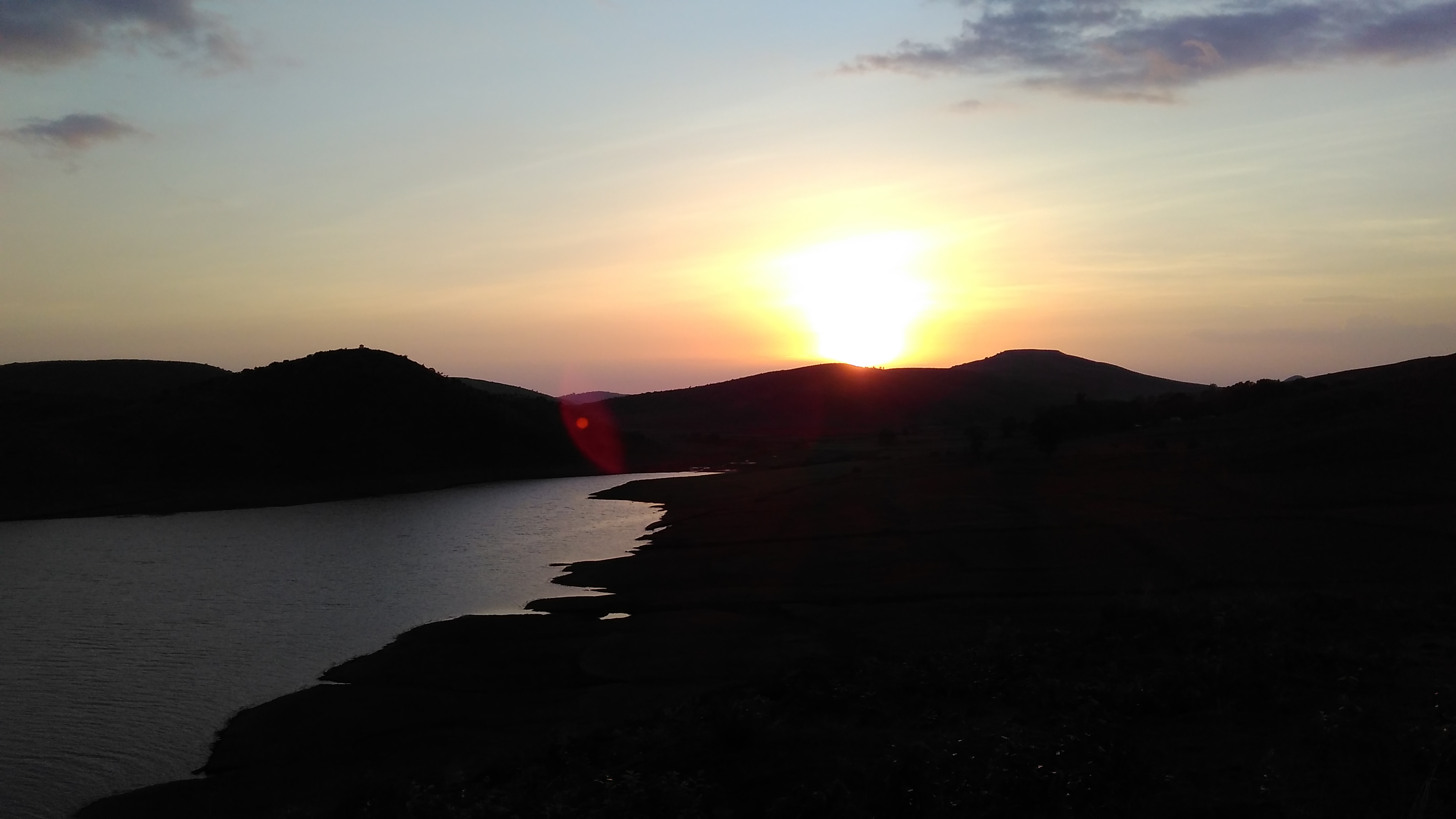
Sunset in Koraput

Koraput is located at 18.82°N 82.72°E. It has an average elevation of 870 m (2,850 ft).

Some major rivers of Odisha pass through the district Koraput like Machhakunda, Vamsadhara and Kolab. This district is also bestowed with waterfalls like Duduma, Bagra and Khandahati. It also contains the largest mountain of Odisha, called Deomali along with Chandragiri mountain. Koraput district is famous for the important places like Jeypur, Duduma, Bagra, Sunabeda MiG factory. Koraput holds a total area of 8,807 km^{2}. As of 2011 census, with a total population of 13,79,647, the district has a literacy rate of 36.20%. Koraput is dependent on agricultural activities. The district has total cultivable land of 301,000 hectares (740,000 acres). With a 157 km long national highway the district is well connected to all the other districts of Odisha. Gupteswar, Neelabadi, Nandapur, Sunabeda, Duduma water fall, (Savra shrikhetra), Ankadeli forms the major interests of Koraput.

=== Hill stations ===
Being at the heart of tribal belt in South Odisha, it has also many hill stations. Places like Machkund, Onukadelli, Jalaput, Chindri, Hatipathar, (Deomali) and Potangi are nearby places which are visited for their scenery.

== Climate ==
Climate data for Koraput, Odisha
Month	Jan	Feb	Mar	Apr	May	Jun	Jul	Aug	Sep	Oct	Nov	Dec	Year
Mean daily maximum °C (°F)	25 (77)	28.2 (82.8)	31.3 (88.3)	33 (91)	33.4 (92.1)	28.4 (83.1)	24.9 (76.8)	24.8 (76.6)	25.9 (78.6)	26.2 (79.2)	25.1 (77.2)	24.3 (75.7)	27.5 (81.5)
Mean daily minimum °C (°F)	12.9 (55.2)	15.3 (59.5)	18.3 (64.9)	21 (70)	22.9 (73.2)	22.2 (72.0)	20.8 (69.4)	20.5 (68.9)	20.3 (68.5)	18.5 (65.3)	15.2 (59.4)	12.8 (55.0)	18.4 (65.1)
Average rainfall mm (inches)	8 (0.3)	3 (0.1)	19 (0.7)	53 (2.1)	84 (3.3)	213 (8.4)	437 (17.2)	391 (15.4)	247 (9.7)	116 (4.6)	27 (1.1)	8 (0.3)	1,606 (63.2)
Source: en.climate-data.org

== Transport ==
Koraput has good linkage with other parts of the state as well as some major cities of neighbouring states, by means of rail and road. National highway number 26(43) passes through the town which connects it with Raipur and Visakhapatnam. Buses are plenty from Visakhapatnam and Vijayanagaram to Koraput. Buses to Jeypore, Jagdalpur, Umerkote, etc., also pass through Koraput.

Koraput railway station connects Koraput with Rayagada, Visakhapatnam, Berhampur, Jagdalpur, Howrah, Bhubaneswar, Rourkela and Raipur.

Also, the new proposed Biju Expressway will connect this city with Rourkela.

== Administration ==
Koraput district is divided into 2 sub-divisions and 14 blocks. The 2 sub-divisions are Koraput and Jeypore

Blocks in Koraput sub-division 1. Koraput 2. Semiliguda 3. Nandapur 4. Pottangi 5. Dasmanthpur 6. Lamtaput 7. Laxmipur 8. Narayanapatna 9. Bandugaon

Blocks in Jeypore sub-division 1. Borigumma 2. Jeypore 3. Kotpada 4. Boipariguda 5. Kundura

== Education ==
Educational facilities in Koraput include schools and SLN Medical College and Hospital.

Central University of Odisha (CUO), formerly Central University of Orissa, was established by parliament under the Central Universities Act, 2009 (No. 3C of 2009) by Government of India, situated at Sunabeda Town, Koraput District in the Indian state of Odisha. The territorial jurisdiction of the university is whole of the Odisha state.

As far as higher studies are concerned, Koraput has got one Woman's College and Government College, both of which are affiliated to Vikram Dev University located at Jeypore.

In 2009, a central university was set up in Koraput namely Central University of Orissa. This started functioning from August 2009 providing courses on English, Oriya, mass communication, journalism, anthropology and sociology. Prof Surabhi Banarjee was appointed as the first vice-chancellor of the university.

On 4 September 2017, the new government medical college was established in Koraput and named after Saheed Laxman Nayak, a great freedom fighter of that region. Classes started in September 2017.

== Politics ==
Current MP of the Koraput Lok Sabha constituency is Saptagiri Ulaka and the current MLA from Koraput Assembly Constituency is Raghu Ram Padal who won the seat in State elections in 2019. Koraput is part of, the Koraput Lok Sabha constituency.

== Festivals ==
PARAB (ପରବ)

A festival of festivals PARAB – an annual tribal festival organized by the District Council of Culture, Koraput is a gala event of the state, organized in the month of November every year all over the district. The whole month of parab witnesses events on sports culture, seminar mountain trekking, boat race and artists camp. On a third day from all over the country are staged on one platform, with crafts mela and exhibitions in the Koraput Parab ground.

== See also ==
- Koraput travel guide from Wikivoyage
- Koraput District
