= Department of Higher Education (India) =

Federal government department in India

Higher Education Department
Department overview
- Jurisdiction: Government of India
- Headquarters: New Delhi, India
- Department executive: Deepti Gaur Mukerjee ,IAS, Secretary, Department of Higher Education.
- Parent department: Ministry of Education

Department of Higher Education is the department under Ministry of Education that oversees higher education in India.

The department is responsible for the overall development of the basic infrastructure of Higher Education sector, both in terms of policy and planning. It looks after expansion of access and qualitative improvement in the Higher Education, through Universities, Colleges and other Institutions.

The department is empowered to grant deemed university status to educational institutions on the advice of the University Grants Commission (UGC) of India, under Section 3 of the University Grants Commission (UGC) Act, 1956.

== Organisation ==
The department is divided into eight bureaus, and most of the work of the department is handled through over 100 autonomous organisations under these bureaus:

- University and Higher Education; Minorities Education
  - University Grants Commission (UGC)
  - Indian Council of Social Science Research (ICSSR)
  - Indian Council of Historical Research (ICHR)
  - Indian Council of Philosophical Research (ICPR)
  - 7 Indian Institute of Science Education and Research (IISERs)
  - 38 Central Universities (including 15 new Central Universities which have been established w.e.f. 15.01.2009 by an ordinance promulgated by President of India)
  - Indian Institute of Advanced Studies (IIAS), Shimla
  - All India Survey of Higher Education (AISHE)
- Technical Education
  - All India Council of Technical Education (AICTE)
  - Council of Architecture (COA)
  - 5 Indian Institutes of Information Technology (IIITs) (Allahabad, Gwalior, Jabalpur and Kancheepuram, Kurnool)
  - 23 Indian Institutes of Technology (IITs)
  - 20 Indian Institutes of Management (IIMs)
  - 31 National Institutes of Technology (NITs)
  - Sant longowal Institute of engineering and technology (CFTI)
  - Other CFTIes
  - 3 School of Planning and Architecture (SPAs)
  - 4 National Institutes of Technical Teachers’ Training & Research (NITTTRs)
  - 4 Regional Boards of Apprenticeship / Practical Training
- Administration and Languages
  - Three Central Universities in the field of Sanskrit, viz. Central Sanskrit University, New Delhi, Shri Lal Bahadur Shastri National Sanskrit University, New Delhi, and National Sanskrit University, Tirupati
  - Kendriya Hindi Sansthan (KHS), Agra
  - English and Foreign Language University (EFLU), Hyderabad
  - National Council for Promotion of Urdu Language (NCPUL)
  - National Council for Promotion of Sindhi Language (NCPSL)
  - Three subordinate offices: Central Hindi Directorate (CHD), New Delhi; Commission for Scientific & Technological Terminology (CSTT), New Delhi; and Central Institute of Indian Languages, Mysore
- Distance Education and Scholarships
  - Indira Gandhi National Open University (IGNOU)
- UNESCO, International Cooperation, Book Promotion and Copyrights, Education Policy, Planning and Monitoring
- Integrated Finance Division.
- Statistics, Annual Plan and CMIS
- Administrative Reform, North Eastern Region, SC/ST/OBC

Others:

- National Testing Agency (NTA)
- National Institute of Educational Planning and Administration (NIEPA)
- National Book Trust (NBT)
- National Commission for Minority Educational Institutions (NCMEI)
- National Council of Educational Research and Training (NCERT)
- Central Board of Secondary Education (CBSE)
- Kendriya Vidyalaya Sangathan (KVS)
- Navodaya Vidyalaya Samiti (NVS)
- National Institute of Open Schooling (NIOS)
- Central Tibetan School Administration (CTSA)
- National Foundation for Teachers' Welfare
- Educational Consultants India Limited (EdCIL)

== Digital Initiatives ==
Department of Higher Education, Ministry of Education is administering ‘National Mission on Education through Information and Communication Technology’ (NMEICT) Scheme to leverage the potential of ICT, in providing high-quality personalized and interactive knowledge modules over the internet/ intranet for all the learners in Higher Education Institutions in anytime anywhere mode

- NMEICT Initiatives in Technology Enabled Learning (TEL)
  - e-ShodhSindhu
  - e-Yantra
  - National Digital Library of India
  - SATHEE
  - SAMARTH - University ERP Solution
  - SWAYAM - Massive Online Open Courses
  - VIDWAN - Expert Database and National Research Network
  - Virtual Labs

Initiatives in alignment with the National Education Policy 2020

- NEP2020 Initiatives
  - Academic Bank of Credits (ABC)
  - Global Initiative of Academic Networks (GIAN)

== See also ==
- List of autonomous higher education institutes in India
- Education in India
- University Grants Commission (India)
- Department of Higher Education (Tamil Nadu)
- Department of Higher Education (Kerala)
- SWAYAM
- National Institute of Open Schooling
- National Academic Depository
- National Education Policy 2020
