= K. Satchidananda Murty =

Indian philosopher (1924–2011)

Kotha Satchidananda Murty
- Born: 25 September 1924; Sangam Jagarlamudi, Guntur district, India
- Died: 25 January 2011 (aged 86); Guntur, Andhra Pradesh
- Awards: Padma Bhushan; Padma Vibhushan

Education
- Education: Andhra University

Philosophical work
- Era: 20th Century
- Region: Hinduism
- Institutions: Andhra University; Sri Venkateswara University; University Grants Commission; Central University for Tibetan Studies
- Main interests: Indian philosophy
- Notable works: Evolution of Indian Philosophy

Kotha Satchidananda Murty (1924-2011) was an Indian philosopher and professor. Murty served as the Professor of Philosophy, Andhra University, Visakhapatnam and Vice-Chancellor of Sri Venkateswara University, Tirupati in the state of Andhra Pradesh, South India. He specialized in Buddhist philosophy and contributed extensively to Mahayana Buddhism. His treatise on the teachings of Nagarjuna is well acclaimed.

== Education ==
Murty was born in 1924 in a small village Sangam Jagarlamudi, Guntur district of Andhra Pradesh to Kotha Veerabhadraiah and Ratnamamba. He completed the school study in the village and Intermediate education from Hindu College, Guntur. He graduated from Andhra University, Visakhapatnam and carried out Ph.D. research in philosophy from the same university.

== Career ==
Murty served as professor of philosophy at Princeton University in 1959. In 1960, he joined Andhra University as a professor. 1963 saw Murty join the Peoples University, Beijing, China in the same capacity as before, additionally also serving as a professor at University of Hyderabad. He was then appointed special officer at the Centre for Post Graduate Studies, Guntur in 1971. Murty has also served as vice-chancellor of Sri Venkateswara University, Tirupati(1975) & Central Institute of Tibetan Studies, Sarnath(1989), whilst also being appointed as vice-chairman of The University Grants Commission, New Delhi, in 1986.

== Works ==
- His lectures on Philosophy of Religion - "The Realm of Between" has gained wide acclaim. It was published by Indian Institute of Advanced Study, Simla in 1973. It was based on three of his lectures delivered in Oxford and in London in 1963. They are based on the various themes like "Suffering", "Salvation", "Religious Action", "Transcendental Philosophy" etc., Subsequently, a group of professors in Andhra University published his lectures in a volume entitled Collected Criticism of K. Satchidananda Murty in 1975.
- Revelation and reason in Advaita Vedanta, Ph.D. thesis submitted to Andhra University and subsequently published by Motilal Banarsidass, Delhi in 1974.
- Life, thought, and culture in India, c. AD 300–1000, as a Project of History of Indian Science, Philosophy, and Culture and published by Centre for Studies in Civilizations, New Delhi.
- Ethics, education, Indian unity, and culture : addresses in universities from Kashi to Kashmir, 1980–89, some excerpts, 1991.
- Readings in Indian history, politics and philosophy, published by Allen & Unwin, London in 1967.
- Current trends in Indian philosophy, published by Andhra University, Waltair in 1972.
- Radhakrishnan : his life and ideas, published by State University of New York, 1990
- Philosophy in India : traditions, teaching, and research, 1985.
- Studies in the problems of peace, published by Asia Publishing House, 1960.
- The Indian spirit, published by Andhra University press, 1965.
- Metaphysics, man and freedom, published by Asia Publishing House, 1963.

== Works based on his philosophy ==
- The philosophy of K. Satchidananda Murty by Sibajiban Bhattacharyya and Ashok Vohra, Published by Indian Council of Philosophical Research, New Delhi, 1995.
- Philosophical perspectives of K. Satchidananda Murty by P. Boaz, 2013.

== Awards and honours ==
- President — Indian Philosophical Congress
- Honorary Doctorate — Russian Academy of Sciences - 1989
- Honorary Doctorate — Beijing University - 1988
- Padma Bhushan, Government of India - 1984
- Padma Vibhushan, Government of India - 2001

== Death ==
He died after a brief respiratory illness at Guntur on Monday 25 January 2011.
