= SWAYAM =

Indian Massive open online course (MOOC) platform

Study Webs of Active-Learning for Young Aspiring Minds

Agency overview
- Formed: 9 July 2017; 9 years ago
- Parent department: Ministry of Education
- Website: swayam.gov.in

SWAYAM (Sanskrit pronunciation: [swˈa y a m]) is an Indian government portal for a free open online course (MOOC) platform providing educational courses for university and college learners.

== History ==
The SWAYAM initiative was launched by the Ministry of Human Resource Development (now renamed as Ministry of Education), Government of India under Digital India to give a coordinated stage and free entry to web courses, covering all advanced education, high school, and skill sector courses. It was launched on 9 July 2017 by Pranab Mukherjee, President of India.

== Activities ==
The SWAYAM platform offers free access to everyone and hosts courses from class 9 to post-graduation. It enables professors and faculty of centrally funded institutes like IITs, IIMs, IISERs, etc. to teach students.

To date, a total of 11772 courses have been offered through SWAYAM, and about 1182 courses are on offer in the January 2024 Semester. As per Department of Higher Education (India), about 1.21 Crore unique users/registrations have been made on the SWAYAM platform, and more than 4 Crore enrolments have been made in various courses offered on SWAYAM.

A total of 859 Indian Sign Language videos for primary classes have been produced and regularly telecast on PM eVIDYA DTH TV channels. This aligns with the National Education Policy 2020 which reiterates the need for development of National and State Curriculum materials for use by students with hearing impairment.

SWAYAM has been developed cooperatively by the Ministry of Education and All India Council for Technical Education (AICTE), with the help of Microsoft. SWAYAM has accumulated 203 partnering institutes, 2,748 completed courses, 12,541,992 student enrollments, 915,538 exam registrations, and 654,664 successful certificates.

SWAYAM (meaning 'Self' in Sanskrit) is an acronym that stands for "Study Webs of Active-Learning for Young Aspiring Minds"

== Functionality ==
SWAYAM operates MOOCs learning resources in different ways and structures. Learning is delivered in four ways; e-Tutorial, e-Content, discussion forums and, self-assessment.

The first quadrant is direct teaching, which means that there is not much extra work by students. It could include teaching video, animation, PowerPoint presentations, Podcast, and so on. These will depend on the individual subject and the strategy adopted by the teacher.

The second quadrant is an e-content which could include e-books, illustrations, Case studies, Open source content, reference links, further reading sources, etc.

The third quadrant is about clearing students' queries where students can interact with each other and faculty; any student or faculty can answer a student’s question.

The fourth quadrant is self-assessment to check what a student has studied and whether they are eligible to get a certificate. This includes tests in the form of Multiple Choice Questions (MCQs), quiz or short answer questions, long answer questions, etc. The fourth quadrant also has Frequently Asked Questions (FAQs) and their answers to clarify common misconceptions among students.

The University Grants Commission (UGC) considers that universities should play a key role in publicizing and popularizing SWAYAM courses among their learners and the university, enabling them to gain from MOOCs on a more extensive footing.

== National coordinators ==
Ten national coordinators are appointed to manage the course content. Each coordinator is assigned a particular area for maintenance.

1. All India Council for Technical Education (AICTE) has been appointed as a National coordinator by MoE for self-paced and international courses.
2. National Programme on Technology Enhanced Learning (NPTEL) has been as a appointed National coordinator by MoE for engineering sector courses.
3. University Grants Commission (UGC) has been appointed as a National coordinator by MoE for non-technical post-graduate education.
4. Consortium for Educational Communication (CEC) has been appointed as a National coordinator by MoE for undergraduate education.
5. National Council of Educational Research and Training (NCERT) has been appointed as a National coordinator by MoE for school education.
6. National Institute of Open Schooling (NIOS) has been appointed as a National coordinator by MoE for school education.
7. Indira Gandhi National Open University (IGNOU) has been appointed as a National coordinator by MoE for out-of-school students.
8. Indian Institute of Management, Bangalore (IIMB) has been appointed as a National coordinator by MoE for management studies.
9. National Institute of Technical Teachers Training and Research (NITTTR) has been appointed as a National coordinator by MoE for Teacher training program.
10. INI-Institute of National Importance has been appointed as a National Coordinator by MoE for Teacher training program.

== Courses offered ==
Subject	No. of courses	Offered by/under

SCHOOL
Accountancy	3	NCERT
Biology	3	NCERT
Business studies	2	NCERT
Chemistry	3	NCERT
Economics	2	NCERT
Food Nutrition for Healthy Living	1	NCERT
Geography	4	NCERT
Mathematics	3	NCERT
Physics	4	NCERT
Psychology	3	NCERT
Sociology	2	NCERT

Undergraduate courses
Engineering
Aerospace	1	IIT Madras
Bioengineering	3	IIT Madras
Biotechnology	1	IIT Madras
Chemical	1	IIT Madras
Civil	1	IIT Madras
Computer Science	18	Punjabi University; Panjab University - Anna University - Gujarat University - IIT Madras - IGNOU
Electrical	4	IIT Madras
Electronics	115	IIT Madras; Anna University - IIT Mumbai - IIT Kanpur - IIT Roorkee - IIT Kharagpur - IISc - IIT Delhi - IIT Guwahati - IISER Kolkata - IIIT Delhi
Environment	1	Devi Ahilya Vishwavidyalaya
General	31	IIT Madras; IIT Kanpur; IIT Roorkee; IIT Kharagpur; IIT Mumbai
Geology	1	Dr. Harisingh Gour Vishwavidyalaya
Graphics	1	IIT Madras
Instrumentation-and-Control	1	IIT Madras
Mechanical	8	IIT Madras
Metallurgy	1	IIT Madras

Management
Entrepreneurship	2	IIT Madras
Finance	1	IIT Madras
Human Resources	1	IIT Madras
Marketing	3	Jai Narain Vyas University; SP Pune University; IIT Madras
Operations Research	1	IIT Madras
Services	2	IIT Madras; IIM Bangalore

Science
Biochemistry	1	IIT Madras
Biology	1	Gujarat University
Chemistry	5	IGNOU; IIT Roorkee; University of Delhi; IIT Madras
Genetics	1	University of Kashmir
Physics	2	IIT Madras; University of Hyderabad
Sericulture	1	University of Mysore
Zoology	1	Gujarat University

Mathematics
Basic	2	IIT Madras; Shiv Nadar University
Calculus	2	IIT Madras
Statistics	3	University of Calicut; IIT Madras
Humanities		

Humanities
Archeology	2	Manipur University; IIT Delhi
Economics	1	IIT Madras
Ethics	2	IIT Madras; Jadavpur University
Geography	2	University of Mysore
History	2	St Xaviers Autonomous College – Kolkata; Punjabi University
Population Studies	1	Madurai Kamaraj University
Psychology	3	The English & Foreign Languages University; IIT Madras
Sociology	1	University of Calicut
Philosophy & Religious Studies	2	FLAME University

Language
English	5	IIT Madras
Literature	1	The English & Foreign Languages University
German	2	IIT Madras
Russian	2	Maharaja Sayajirao University of Baroda

Arts & Recreation
Audio-Visual Media	1	Shiv Nadar University
Films	1	IIT Madras
Music	1	IIT Madras
Performing Arts	1	IIT Madras
Photography	1	Devi Ahilya Vishwavidyalaya
Script Writing	1	St Xavier’s Autonomous College – Kolkata
Visual Art	1	IIT Madras

General
Research	1	University of Hyderabad
Film Studies	1	Central University of Kerala

== Credit transfer ==
All the courses offered by SWAYAM are recognized by the Government of India. All the courses are valid in the country. University Grants Commission announced a "Credit Framework for Online Learning Courses through SWAYAM" Regulations where credit transfer was defined. The UGC regulation requires Universities to make changes in their rules to incorporate provisions for credit mobility and MOOC courses under the SWAYAM platform. Certificates will be given upon completing the criteria of the course taken, and that certificate can be used for credit mobility for academic credits. The current guideline of UGC constrains just 20% of the courses for a degree-level program.

== Local chapter ==
NPTEL is a joint initiative of the IITs and IISC. NPTEL offers online courses and certifications in various fields and has set up a system to provide certificate courses in different colleges across India termed as NPTEL- local chapters. A local chapter will be under one faculty member of the college as one Single Point of Contact (SPOC).

Further under the SWAYAM-NPTEL webpage, two more departments are operated, i.e., timeline, list of active local chapters, local chapter ratings, etc. Other departments show news from local chapters, i.e., local chapter colleges/universities. Each Local Chapter has a separate Coordinator/SPOC.

== SWAYAM PRABHA ==
SWAYAM PRABHA is an education learning platform initiated by the Ministry of Education (MoE) available through 40 (initially 32) DTH channels. This initiative provides an educational program on television free of cost.Themes of programs on swayamprabha channels vary widely ranging from science, engineering to arts and political science.There are also dedicated channels related to Indian languages, cultural diversity and govt exams preparation like SSC, banking etc. As with the SWAYAM online portal, the content providers are NPTEL, IITs, UGC, NCERT etc.

In 2023, the SWAYAM PRABHA started broadcasting educational counselling in Meitei language (officially called Manipuri language) on behalf of the Indira Gandhi National Open University (IGNOU) in Imphal. The live sessions for the lectures were archived on YouTube, thereby enriching and the resources for its learners in the language.

== See also ==
- National Digital University
- Ministry of Education (India)
- Department of Higher Education (India)
- University Grants Commission (India)
- AICTE
- National Education Policy 2020
