= National Digital University =

Online university in India

National Digital University (NDU)
- Type: Public
- Established: 2023
- Affiliations: University Grants Commission
- Campus: Virtual (Online)
- Website: https://www.ndu.digital/

The National Digital University (NDU) (also known as NIELIT Digital University) is India's first digital university, constituted by the Ministry of Education (India) under its National Education Policy 2020. The start of the academic year for 2023-24 is scheduled to take place in July 2023 (now 2024).

== History ==
During the 2022 Union budget of India, Nirmala Sitharaman, the Minister of Finance in India, revealed plans to establish the National Digital University.

NDU plans to provide online courses exclusively through its partner institutes, which can include both private and public universities. It will operate under a hub-and-spoke framework, and the institution will centrally deliver courses to various stakeholders. Through a single portal—in this case, the government's massive open online course portal, Study Webs of Active-Learning for Young Aspiring Minds—students are able to study their courses.

NDU will be linked to the Academic Bank of Credits, enabling students to earn credits from various institutions and providing them with multiple exit points during their course of study. This system allows students to receive certificates, diplomas, or degrees based on their progress.

Since SWAYAM's inception in 2017, the outcomes have been discouraging in three aspects: the rate of course completion, student satisfaction, and faculty morale. A mere 4% of students who enrolled in courses have successfully completed them.
