= Bharatiya Khel =

Indian government sports programme

- Type: Governmental programme
- Headquarters: Vasant Kunj, Delhi, India
- Region served: India
- Official language: English
- Parent organisation: Indian Knowledge Systems (IKS) Division, Ministry of Education, India
- Website: bharatiyakhel.in

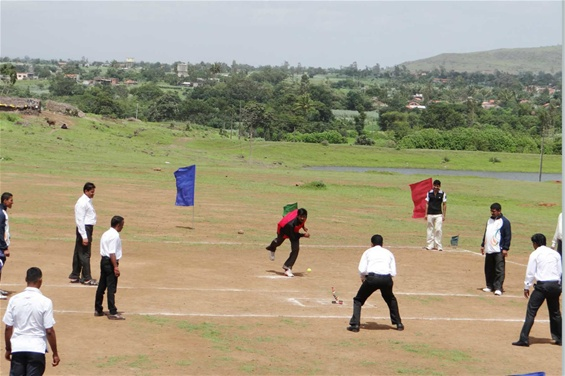
The game of seven stones, which is one of the 75 games featured by Bharatiya Khel.

Bharatiya Khel (Hindi: भारतीय खेल, transl. Indian Games) is an initiative of the Indian government under the National Education Policy (NEP) and Indian Knowledge Systems (IKS) policies to introduce 75 traditional Indian games into schools across the country. Interschool competitions are held, with one seasonal game selected each month, and the best-performing schools and teachers earning certificates of recognition.

Part of the reason behind the initiative is to make sport more affordable and equitable for children across India (especially those who are poor and/or rural), as traditional Indian games require minimal resources and infrastructure. These games are also meant to encourage teamwork and creativity, as the 2020 NEP has dictated that "multi-faceted growth" and "fun-filled learning" should be given priority, and give children a more traditional Indian education.

A variety of games from across India have been chosen for this initiative, most of which have been played with slight variations across the country for thousands of years, and some of which have even featured in ancient scriptures such as the Mahabharata. Along with physical sports, some traditional board games have also been included.

== Reception ==
In the first two years of the initiative, only 1,500 schools have participated. Negative feedback includes the issue that there is a lack of financial incentive and that rural schools don't always have the means to upload videos and participate in competitions held in an online format.
