= Project of History of Indian Science, Philosophy and Culture =

Project of History of Indian science and civilization (PHISPC) is a project initiated by the Centre for Studies in Civilizations under the editorship of Professor D. P. Chattopadhyaya in India. The series also contains 20 monographs.

PHISPC is a large-scale literary project funded by the Ministry of Human Resource Development. The goal of the project is to publish fifty volumes of books and anthologies, thirty of which will be major volumes, and twenty of which are to be monographs. According to the last update on the projects website, seven volumes and eleven monographs have been published, and in the financial year 2001-02, 7-8 more volumes were to be published, as well as one monograph.

== Volumes ==
A project aimed at corroborating the Indian traditions (pertaining to the various branches of sciences) with the extant Archaeological Remains of India (dated members) on completion has now been published in Germany, in September 2010. This work is entirely Archaeology Based that are in situ and hence - verifiable. The Book also reports about the whereabouts of 150 Palm leaf manuscripts (iron stylus engraved) of great antiquity; AND, also takes the non-Hindu readers into the store houses of Hindu shrines (considered as almanacs in stone) - that are out of bounds for the non-Hindus. "Indian Ancient Sciences" ISBN 978-3-8383-9027-7; Lap Lambert; Germany. The volumes (with many book parts) are divided thus:

- Conceptual volumes in two parts on Science, Philosophy and Culture edited by D. P. Chattopadhyaya and Ravinder Kumar
- Volume 1. The Dawn and Development of Indian Civilization.

Part 1. The Dawn of Indian civilization, edited by Govind Chandra Pande
Part 2. Life, thought and culture in India (from c. 600 BC to c. AD 300) edited by Govind Chandra Pande
Part 3. India's interaction with Southeast Asia, edited by Govind Chandra Pande
Part 4. A golden chain of civilization: Indian, Iranian, Semitic, and Hellenic, edited by Govind Chandra Pande
Part 5. Puranas, History and Itihasa edited by Vidya Niwas Mishra

- Volume 2. Life, Thought and Culture in India (AD 300 -1100)
- Volume 3. Development of Philosophy, Science and Technology in India and Neighbouring Civilizations
- Volume 4. Fundamental Indian Ideas in Physics, Chemistry, Life Sciences and Medicine
- Volume 5. Agriculture in India
- Volume 6. Culture, Language, Literature and Arts
- Volume 7. The Rise of New Polity and Life in Villages and Towns
- Volume 8. Economic History of India
- Volume 9. Colonial Period

Part 1. Medicine in India: Modern Period, by O.P. Jaggi.

- Volume 10. Towards Independence

Part 1. Development of Indian philosophy from eighteenth century onwards, by Daya Krishna

- Volume 15. Science pre Independence

Part 4. Edited by Umadas Gupta 2011

A sub-project in the larger project is Consciousness Science, Society, Value, and Yoga (CONSSAVY) with five planned volumes (each with several books):

- Volume 1. Levels of Reality
- Volume 2. Theories of Natural and Life Sciences
- Volume 3. Natural and Cultural Sciences
- Volume 4. Science, Technology, Philosophy and Yoga
- Volume 5. Yoga
- Volume 6. "tantra Sadhana"

== Monographs ==
The Monograph series of PHISPC has 20 planned volumes on different aspects of science, philosophy, and the arts. Thirteen of these volumes have already appeared:

- Volume 1. Philosophy and Culture in Historical Perspective edited by D. P. Chattopadhyaya and Ravinder Kumar
- Volume 2. Some Aspects of Indi's Philosophical and Scientific Heritage edited by D. P. Chattopadhyaya and Ravinder Kumar
- Volume 3. Mathematics, Astronomy and Biology in Indian Tradition edited by D. P. Chattopadhyaya and Ravinder Kumar
- Volume 4. Language, Logic and Science in India edited by D. P. Chattopadhyaya and Ravinder Kumar
- Volume 5. Primal Spirituality of the Vedas: Its Renewal and Renaissance by R. Balasubramanian
- Volume 6. Interdisciplinary Studies in Science, Technology, Philosophy and Culture edited by D. P. Chattopadhyaya and Ravinder Kumar
- Volume 7. Ancient Yoga and Modern Science by T.R. Anantharaman
- Volume 8. Prolegomena to any Future Historiography of Cultures and Civilizations by Daya Krishna
- Volume 9. On Rational Historiography by V. Shekhawat
- Volume 10. Science and Spirituality: A Quantum Integration edited by Amit Goswami and Maggie Goswami
- Volume 11. Kautiliya Arthasastra Revisited by S.N. Metal
- Volume 12. Ways of Understanding the Human Past by D. P. Chattopadhyaya
- Volume 13. The Architecture of Knowledge by Subhash Kak

== See also ==
- History of science and technology in the Indian subcontinent
- History of science and technology in India
- List of Indian inventions and discoveries
- Nalanda University
- Timeline of historic inventions
- Timeline of Indian innovation
