= LEAD School =

Indian school edtech company

- Type: Private
- Industry: Educational technology
- Founded: 2012
- Founders: Sumeet Mehta; Smita Deorah
- Headquarters: Mumbai, India
- Area served: India
- Number of employees: 1123 (May, 2025)
- Website: leadschool.in

LEAD School is an Indian school edtech company headquartered in Mumbai, India. The company operates in India's education sector, delivering a learning system that includes curriculum, teacher training and technology-based resources to private schools. LEAD School was founded in 2012 by Sumeet Mehta and Smita Deorah and is currently serving more than 3.5 million students across India.

== History ==
LEAD School was established in 2012 by Sumeet Mehta and Smita Deorah, who sought to address educational disparities in India’s budget private schools. In 2012, they opened Shantiniketan English School in Areri, a village 35 kilometers from Ahmedabad, Gujarat, starting with 14 students. Over the next few years, four additional schools were set up in small towns across Maharashtra and Gujarat. By 2017, the focus shifted from operating these schools to partnering with existing ones, a change prompted by the scale of India’s affordable private school network, estimated at over 400,000 institutions.

In 2017, LEAD School raised INR 10 crore in a Series A funding round led by Elevar Equity, its initial external investor. In 2019, the name changed from "LEAD Powered Schools" to "LEAD School," and technologies like teacher tablets and smart classrooms were added to its offerings. Additional funding occurred in 2020, with INR 210 crore raised in a Series C round led by WestBridge Capital. In January 2022, a Series E round brought in $100 million, resulting in a valuation of $1.1 billion. This valuation classified LEAD School as a unicorn, a term for a privately held company valued at $1 billion or more, placing it among other Indian edtech companies that had reached this threshold earlier. The round, led by WestBridge Capital with GSV Ventures participating, followed a Series D round of $30 million from nine months prior.

In 2023, LEAD School also acquired Pearson India’s K-12 business, increasing its network by 6,000 schools. During the COVID-19 pandemic, the company provided digital resources to schools from 2020 to 2021, an initiative noted by industry observers for supporting remote learning during nationwide school closures. Its system has incorporated elements aligned with the National Education Policy 2020, such as coding skills, since its early years, and later included aspects of the National Curriculum Framework 2023.

== Educational model ==
LEAD School operates an integrated learning system covering pre-primary to Grade 10. The system uses offline as well as digital classrooms equipped with smart boards, integrates AI-driven tools for personalised learning and includes regular evaluations and data analysis to monitor student progress. Teacher training is part of the approach, with ongoing professional development provided to educators. The system targets schools with limited resources.
