= National Digital Library of India =

Virtual repository of learning resources

National Digital Library of India (NDLI)
- Website type: Education
- Headquarters: Indian Institute of Technology (IIT) Kharagpur, Kharagpur, West Bengal, India
- Country of origin: India
- Key people: B. Sutradhar (Joint Principal Investigator)
- Website: www.ndl.gov.in
- Commercial: No
- Registration: Free
- Launched: 19 June 2018
- Current status: Active

The National Digital Library of India (NDLI) is a virtual repository of educational resources operated by the Indian Institute of Technology Kharagpur in Kharagpur, West Bengal. The library is sponsored by the Indian Ministry of Education.

== History ==
=== 2014–2017: Establishment and Growth ===
The development of the digital library portal began as a pilot project (NDLI Ph-I) in April 2015. By 2016, the beta version of the portal was launched. The program continued to operate as a pilot project (NDLI Ph-I) until 30 September 2017.

During this period, efforts were made to organise content, and partnerships were established with institutions across India, including central libraries of various universities, public libraries, and other educational institutions. The portal expanded its repository and incorporated tools to facilitate access and usability, including multilingual support.

=== 2017–2020: Phase II and Official Launch ===
The second phase (NDLI Ph-II) began on 1 October 2017, and was originally scheduled to end on 31 March 2020, but was extended to 31 March 2021 due to the COVID-19 pandemic.

The Digital Library Portal was officially inaugurated on 19 June 2018 by Prakash Javadekar, the former Union Minister of Human Resource Development, and Minister of Information and Broadcasting. The initiative aimed to integrate significant Indian digital and non-digital libraries through a single-window platform, to make educational resources more widely accessible. By 2019, NDLI had aggregated over 30 million items in more than 70 languages, covering subjects such as literature, science, mathematics, engineering, and medicine.

During this period, changes were made to its user interface. By then, NDLI began digitising indigenous content, including manuscripts and folk literature.

=== COVID-19 response ===
As schools, colleges, and universities across India went into lockdown on 25 March 2020, NDLI reorganised its content into user-focused categories.

=== 2021–2026: Phase III ===
The Ministry of Education of the Government of India launched the third phase (NDLI Ph-III) on 1 April 2021, with the project expected to run until 31 March 2026. As normal activities gradually resumed after the pandemic, a major overhaul of NDLI was implemented to further enhance its capabilities and reach.

== Content partners ==
NDLI currently houses content from 23 state boards and national boards such as CBSE and NCERT. The range of content includes school, college, and university-level topics.

These resources are available in the form of text, videos, audiobooks, presentations, and simulations in multiple Indian languages.

=== Access and restriction ===
User registration is open to users from around the world. However, content from some sources is only accessible to registered users, including works from:

- World eBook Library
- OECD iLibrary
- Satyajit Ray Society

== Services ==
=== NDLI Club ===
To address awareness and adoption of its platform, several initiatives have been undertaken with the assistance of the Government of India, including the NDLI club.

In 2020, the Indian government launched the National Education Policy (NEP 2020), and NDLI aligned its services with recommendations in NEP 2020. These include the establishment of topic-centers and project-based clubs designed to nurture students' interests and talents through supplementary enrichment material, guidance, and support.

NDLI launched the NDLI Club in March 2021 as a digital initiative that provides a platform for institutions to establish activity-based clubs where students can engage in various learning activities using content from the NDLI repository. The platform supports event management, reporting, and certificate generation for participating institutions.

As of July 2024, over 5,800 institutions have established clubs through the NDLI Club platform, involving nearly 1.7 million members from different regions across India. The stated objective of the NDLI Club is to promote NDLI awareness among students and teachers through activity-based learning, offering NDLI as a resource and service.

=== Institutional Digital Repository (IDR) ===
NDLI provides Institutional Digital Repository (IDR) services to academic institutions. To date, NDLI has facilitated the establishment of more than 150 IDRs.

=== Digital Preservation Centre (DPC) ===
NDLI set up its own Digital Preservation Centre at Salt Lake in 2019. Initially, the contents of the Presidency Alumni Association were digitized and integrated into NDLI. This features content such as:

- The Presidency College Register, a list of graduates from 1858 to 1925.
- Oaten on Netaji - Poem by the professor of history on Subhas Chandra Bose.
- Bankim Chandra Chattopadhyay, one of the first graduates of Presidency College, was marked absent in the attendance record of the class of 1858-59.
- Volumes of the journal by the alumni, "Autumn Annual", edited by Late Nabanita Deb Sen.
- Issues of the Bengali science journal "Jnan O Bijnan" that were published from 1948-2020.
- A Bengali translation of "Srimadbhagabad gita", contributed by Udbodhan Karyalaya.

== See also ==
- Digital Library of India
- Traditional Knowledge Digital Library
- Panjab Digital Library
- Open access in India
- Million book project
