= D. P. Chattopadhyaya =

Indian philosopher (1933–2022)

Prof. Debi Prasad Chattopadhyaya

Governor of Rajasthan
- In office 14 February 1990 – 26 August 1991
- Preceded by: Milap Chand Jain (acting)
- Succeeded by: Sarup Singh

Union Minister of Commerce
- In office 5 February 1973 – 24 March 1977; Minister of State until 23 February 1976
- Prime Minister: Indira Gandhi
- Succeeded by: Mohan Dharia

Union Minister of State for Works and Housing
- In office 2 August 1972 – 5 February 1973
- Prime Minister: Indira Gandhi
- Minister: Uma Shankar Dikshit
- Preceded by: Inder Kumar Gujral
- Succeeded by: Om Mehta

Union Minister of State for Health and Family Planning
- In office 2 May 1971 – 5 May 1973
- Prime Minister: Indira Gandhi
- Minister: Uma Shankar Dikshit
- Succeeded by: Ram Sewak Chowdhary

Personal details
- Born: 5 November 1933 Backergunge District, Bengal Presidency, British India (now in Bangladesh)
- Died: 13 February 2022 (aged 88) Kolkata, West Bengal, India
- Awards: Padma Vibhushan (2009)

Professor Debi Prasad Chattopadhyaya (November 5, 1933 – February 13, 2022), was educated at the University of Calcutta and was Deputy Minister of Health of India and Union Minister of Commerce and Industry. He founded the Indian Council of Philosophical Research, New Delhi, and served as its Chairman. Till the end of his life, he served as the Chairman of the Centre for Studies in Civilizations, and General Editor of the Project of History of Indian Science, Philosophy and Culture, which produced a multi-volume cultural history of India.

Chattopadhyaya has authored many books on culture and philosophy. In 2009, he was awarded the Padma Vibhushan, India's second highest civilian award.

== Books ==
- 1967 Individuals and Societies: A Methodological Inquiry
- 1976 History, Individuals and World
- 1980 Rupa, Rasa O Sundara (in Bengali)
- 1988 Sri Aurobindo and Karl Marx
- 1990 Anthropology and Historiography of Science
- 1991 Induction, Probability and Skepticism
- 1997 Sociology, Ideology and Utopia
