= Govind Chandra Pande =

Indian historian and academic (1923–2011)

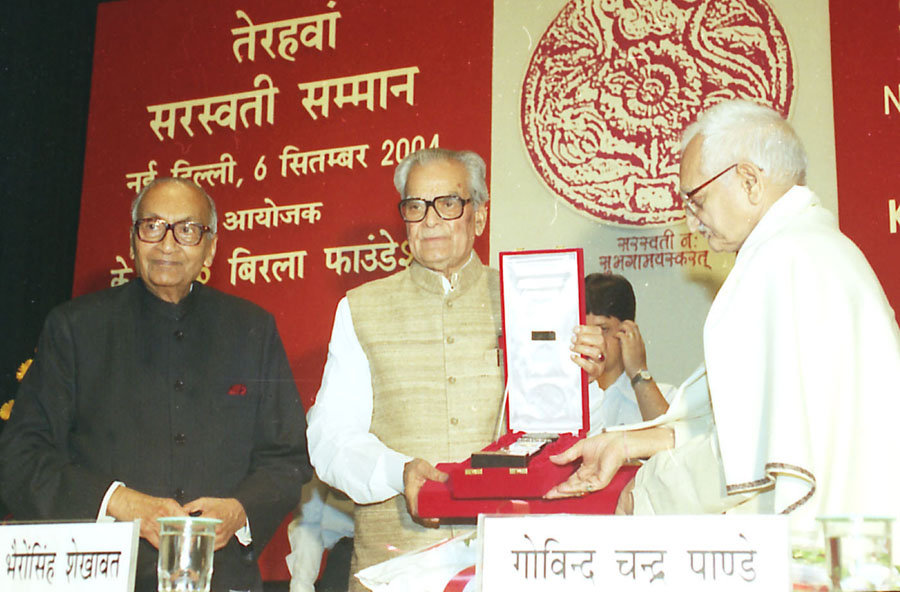
The Vice President Shri Bhairon Singh Shekhawat presenting 13th "Saraswati Samman" award to Prof. G.C. Pande on his book 'Bhagirathi' at a function organised by K.K. Birla foundation in New Delhi on September 6, 2004.

Govind Chandra Pande (30 July 1923 – 21 May 2011) was a well-known Indian scholar, philosopher and historian of the Vedic and the Buddhist periods. He served as professor of ancient history and vice-chancellor at Jaipur and Allahabad universities. He was also the chairman of the Indian Institute of Advanced Study, Simla for several years, the Chairman of Allahabad Museum Society and the Chairman of Central Tibetan Society, Sarnath Varanasi.

Other positions he held include Member, Board of Governors, Central Institute of Higher Tibetan Studies, Sarnath (till 1996); Member, Executive Council, BHU (1982–85); ICHR (1987–93); ICPR (1988–91); Member, Societe Asiatique De Paris, Indian Historical Records Commission, Indian Advisory Board of Archaeology, Editorial Board of the U .P. Gaztters, the Council of Shastri, Indo-Canadian Institute, the Council of the American Institute of Indian Studies.

He started his professional career as a lecturer in Allahabad University in 1947. He was Reader in the Department of Ancient History, Culture and Archaeology till 1957 and was promoted as Dean, Faculty of Arts. He joined the Department of History and culture at University of Rajasthan as the Tagore Professor of History and Indian Culture in 1962. Under his learned and charismatic leadership, the department gradually acquired a distinctive character with great emphasis on the study of ideas and movements in history. He served as the Vice-Chancellor of University of Rajasthan from 1974-1977. Pande rejoined the Allahabad University in 1978 after a gap of 20 years. Being senior most Professor he became officiating Vice Chancellor of Allahabad University for few months.He retired in 1984. During 1984-88 he was Visiting Gaekwad Professor at BHU. He was the first National Fellow of ICHR from 1985 to 1986 and was the President cum chairman, Indian Institute of Advanced Study, Shimla. He was the Chairman of the Allahabad Museum Society and the Central Institute of Higher Tibetan Studies, Sarnath, and Editorial Fellow, Project in Indian History of Science, and Philosophy and Culture.

He edited several volumes of ancient history in Project of History of Indian Science, Philosophy and Culture.

His last major work was a translation and commentary for the Rigveda in Hindi that was published by Lokbharti Booksellers and Distributors, Allahabad. The first volume was launched in 2008 at a ceremony at India International Center in New Delhi by Dinesh Chandra Grover, proprietor of Lokbharti, along with member of parliament, Murli Manohar Joshi and Triloki Nath Chaturvedi (then Governor of Karnataka).

== Works ==
- Life and Thought of Sankaracharya (1998)
- Jaina Political Thought (1984)
- Bauddha Dharma ke Vikas ka Itihas (बौद्ध धर्म के विकास का इतिहास)
- Apohasiddhi (अपोहसिद्धि)
- Nyayavindu (न्यायबिन्दु)
- Mulya Mimamsa (मूल्य मीमांसा) (2005)
- Vaidik Samskriti (वैदिक संस्कृति)
- Studies in the Origins of Buddhism
- The Meaning and Process of Culture
- Rigveda (ऋग्वेद) (2008) (Published by Lokbharti Booksellers and Distributors, Allahabad)
- Bhagirathi (Published by Raka Prakashan, Allahabad) (Awarded: Kabir Samman and Saraswati Samman)
- Mahilaayen (Hindi) (Published by Raka Prakashan, Allahabad)
- Mulya Mimamsa (Hindi) (Published by Raka Prakashan, Allahabad)
- Saundarya Darshan Vimarsha (Sanskrit) (Published by Raka Prakashan, Allahabad)
- Ekam Sad Vipra Bahuda Vadanti (Published by Raka Prakashan, Allahabad)
- Kshan Lakshan (Poem) (Published by Raka Prakashan, Allahabad)
- Agni-Beej (Poem) (Published by Raka Prakashan, Allahabad)
- Hansika (Poem) (Published by Raka Prakashan, Allahabad)
- Jaya (Poem) (Published by Raka Prakashan, Allahabad)
- Yaksha Prashn (Poem) (Published by Raka Prakashan, Allahabad)
- Consciousness Value Culture (Published by Raka Prakashan, Allahabad)

== Awards ==
Various honorary degrees and awards were bestowed on him e.g. D.Litt. (Honoris Causa, BHU, 2001); Vidya Varidhi, (Naves Nalanda Mahavihara, 1981) equivalent to D. Litt; Sahitya Vachaspati (Hindi Sahitya Sammelan, Allahabad); Maha Mahopadhyaya (Lal Bahadur Shastri Rastriya Sanskrit Vidyapeeth, New Delhi 1999); Vakpati, Central Institute of Higher Tibetan Studies, Sarnath, 1998; Sansthana Samman (Hindi Sansthan, Lucknow); Manisha Sammana,(Bharatiya Bhasa Parishad, Kolkata); Mangala Prasad Award, Hindi Sahitya Sammelan, Allahabad; the Darsana Vijnana Award; and the Naresh Mehta Award, and Padma Shri (2010). He was awarded the Saraswati Samman for Bhagirathi, Published by Raka Prakashan, Allahabad in 2003.

History, Philosophy, Culture: Revisiting Professor G C Pande's Thought and Works (2010), published by Aryan Books International, edited by Sibesh Chandra Bhattacharya, is a collection of essays which serves as a suitable introduction to Pande's in-depth interest and expertise. Avya (2005), edited by Prof. Satyaprakash Mishra, published from Raka Prakashan, Allahabad explores essays in Hindi. Avya also contains Pande's auto-biographical article Vichaar Yatra. These volumes provide useful insights into his mind and thoughts as well, reflects his variety of scholarship covering widely diverse fields.
