= Indian Knowledge Systems =

Government division for indigenous knowledge

Indian Knowledge System (IKS)
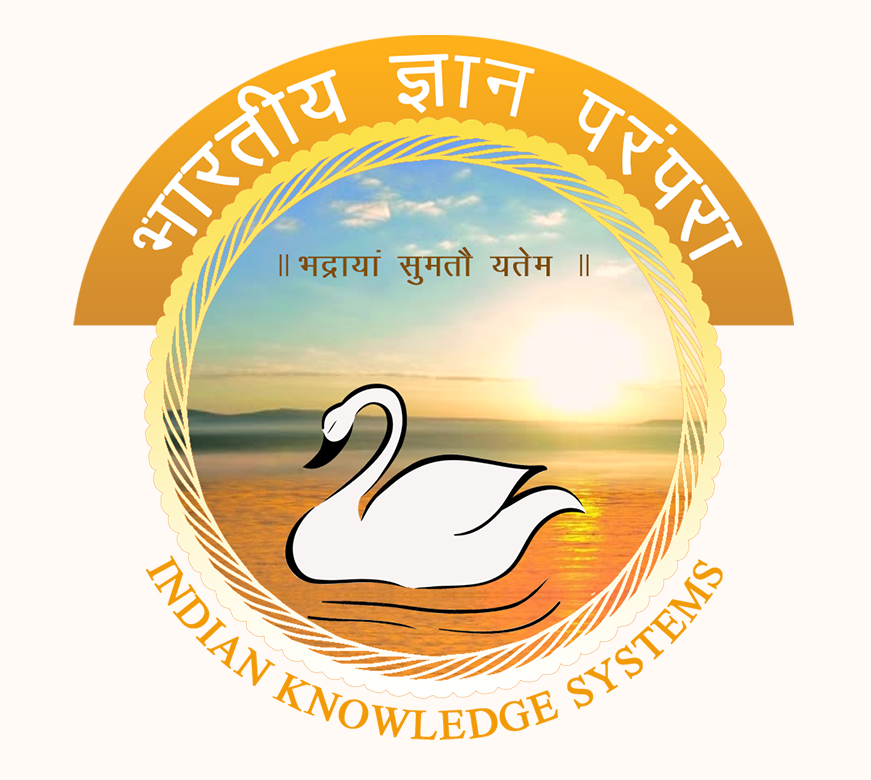
- Logo of Indian Knowledge System, India
- Abbreviation: IKS
- Formation: October 2020; 6 years ago
- Type: Governmental organisation
- Headquarters: Vasant Kunj, Delhi, India
- Region served: India
- Official language: English, Hindi
- National Coordinator: Prof. Ganti S. Murthy
- Parent organisation: Ministry of Education, Govt. of India
- Website: iksindia.org

The Indian Knowledge Systems (IKS), or the Bhāratīya Jñāna Paramparā Vibhāga is a division of the Ministry of Education of the Government of India which purports to promote Indian systems of knowledge. Established in October 2020, it is located in the AICTE headquarters in New Delhi.

Critics of the IKS division have asserted that its curricula peddle pseudoscience and pseudohistory, do not constitute a genuine scholarly "decolonisation" programme, are a tool of indoctrination by the Hindutva ideology of the ruling Bharatiya Janata Party (BJP), and will economically and professionally disadvantage Indian graduates in the workforce.

== History ==
The Indian National Education Policy (NEP), as enacted in 2020, emphasizes the inclusion of IKS into curriculums at all levels of education; in line with this, the National Credit Framework (NCF) has made it possible for students to earn credit in courses relating to ancient Indian sciences and arts. IKS is also being included under the Vision 2047 for Bharatiya Rasayanasastra initiative. In the 2022-2023 budget, IKS's financial allocation was doubled to ₹20 crore (US$2.1 million).

Under University Grants Commission (UGC) guidelines, it is advised that 5 per cent of a student's total credits should be in IKS courses at the undergraduate and postgraduate levels. The UGC aims to train 1.5 million teachers in IKS by 2025, and has launched an online IKS MOOC course.

IKS has also spearheaded and funded certain research initiatives relating to traditional Indian knowledge, such as in relation to agriculture and architecture.

== Topics ==
Vedic mathematics, various shastras such as the Arthashastra, and Indian astronomy will be taught under the IKS initiative. IKS topics for students taking UG medicine courses will include yoga, meditation, and ayurveda.

== Initiatives ==
=== Bharatiya Khel ===
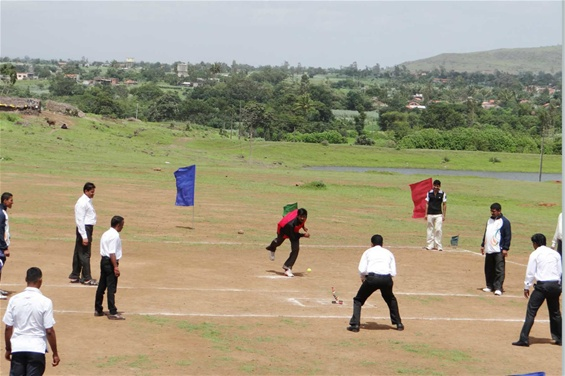
The game of seven stones, which is one of the 75 games featured by Bharatiya Khel.

Bharatiya Khel (Hindi: भारतीय खेल, transl. Indian Games) is an initiative of the Indian government under the National Education Policy (NEP) and Indian Knowledge Systems (IKS) policies to introduce 75 traditional Indian games into schools across the country. Interschool competitions are held, with one seasonal game selected each month, and the best-performing schools and teachers earning certificates of recognition.

=== Implementation in Universities ===
- In January 2024, IIT Roorkee and IIT Bhilai signed an MoU on 29 December 2023 to strengthen the academic and research collaboration between the two institutions. MoU includes promoting Indian culture, IKS, and developing projects across domains.
- In July 2024, IIT Mandi launched MS (research) And PhD programs in Music and Musopathy. The programs aim to explore therapeutic values and science behind Indian music for the overall well-being of human body, mind, and consciousness by leveraging the connection between music, technology, and health.
- In July 2024, Department of Higher Education (Madhya Pradesh) included political concepts from Ramayana, Mahabharata, and Arthashastra, and problem solving skills from Vedic text and Chanakyaniti in its undergraduate and postgraduate programs. DHE confirmed creation of "Indian Knowledge Tradition Centres" in government and private universities across the state.
- In August 2024, IIT Mandi introduced a compulsory course for its BTech fresher students. The course is developed under the IKS division of the institute and it is called 'Introduction to Consciousness and Wellbeing'. The course covers a wide range of topics including theories of consciousness, anatomy and functionality of the physical body, reincarnation and out-of-body experiences. Some topics sparked controversy.

== Reactions ==
=== Criticism ===
Critics of the IKS division have asserted that its curricula pedal pseudoscience and pseudohistory, do not constitute a genuine scholarly "decolonisation" programme, are a tool of indoctrination by the Hindutva ideology of the ruling Bharatiya Janata Party (BJP), and will economically and professionally disadvantage Indian graduates in the workforce.

Writing for The Wire, Vasudevan Mukunth criticised the introduction of a new textbook under the auspices of IKS as a "Trojan horse of pseudoscience". The textbook in question dismisses as a myth the commonly accepted belief that "aeronautics was developed by Wright Brothers in 1903," asserting instead that 5,000 years before the Wright Brothers, "Maharshi Bhardwajan wrote an epic called Yantra Sarvasva and aeronautics is a part of the epic [...] Yantra Sarvasva is not available now but out of whatever we know about it, we can believe that planes were a reality in Vedic age." The textbook also asserts that "It’s a Myth that Theory of Gravity was discovered by Isaac Newton in 1666 AD; the truth is that thousands of years before Newton, a number of epics were written on the gravitational force and we can find the evidence in the Rig Veda".

Manasi Thapliyal Navani, a professor in the School of Education Studies at Dr. B. R. Ambedkar University Delhi, has criticized the IKS curriculum as not being genuinely decolonial, stating that "Indigenous knowledge education or decolonisation projects begin with a critical dialogue with history and with the dominant forces that have shaped modern disciplines," and because IKS curricula lack such critical engagement, "the whole project essentially boils down to becoming one of indoctrination."

Jaheer Mukthar, an assistant professor of economics at Kristu Jayanti College in Bangalore, asserted that "the government is clearly using the textbook as a tool for propagating the Hindutva agenda".

Another criticism is that the IKS curricula may deprive students of access to useful Western knowledge, or bias them against it. In his article for The Wire, Mukunth also warned that an IKS education "would render [Indian] graduates even more unemployable, or under-employed, than they already are". Some critics have urged that IKS courses be made optional so as to not create issues for students who want to take courses that are better for their employment prospects.

Critics have also alleged that it serves to disseminate propaganda to further the political agenda of India's ruling Bharatiya Janata Party (BJP) and its far-right Hindutva/Hindu nationalist ideology.

=== Support ===
The work of the IKS division has been interpreted by some as being guided by a mission to preserve Indian heritage, apply ancient knowledge to modern problems such as climate change, and decolonise Indian education in a way that reduces undue Western influences.

Talking to India Today, IIT Mandi director Laxmidhar Behera said, "Principles from IKS, such as dharma-centric design, ecological balance, and cognitive awareness, can enrich technological thinking by aligning it with human values and environmental sustainability." He further added, "IKS emphasises harmony between human activity and nature."

== See also ==
- History of education in the Indian subcontinent
- Vedic Heritage Portal
- Traditional Knowledge Digital Library
- Traditional knowledge
