= Vedic Heritage Portal =

Indian government portal

- Formation: 27 March 2023; 3 years ago
- Type: Governmental project
- Region served: India
- Official language: English, Hindi
- Project Director: Sudhir Lal
- Parent organisation: Ministry of Culture, India
- Website: vedicheritage.gov.in

Vedic Heritage Portal is an Indian government project initiated at IGNCA, under the country's Ministry of Culture. It provides a portal to communicate messages enshrined in the Vedas and preserve Vedic heritage. The portal contains transcriptions of ancient texts including Vedas, Upanishads, Vedangas, Upvedas, and Vedic rituals in audio-visual form.

== Background ==
The portal was launched by Union Home Minister Amit Shah and Union Culture Minister G. Kishan Reddy on 27 March 2023. Shah said the government is using technology to secure the knowledge in India's ancient scriptures and manuscripts in digital formats making it more accessible.

Sudhir Lal, the project director said IGNCA has been working on various aspects of this project since the center was established in 1987. In 2003, UNESCO declared the chanting of Vedas an "intangible cultural heritage of humanity". Later that year, IGNCA's Arts department made the documentary on the same.

== Portal ==
According to IGNCA, the website has over 550 hours of audio-visual content consisting of more than 18,000 Vedic mantras. It is prepared in collaboration with people from various Vedic research institutes and Vedapathi families, who are experts of Vedic knowledge from across the world. The portal is available in both English and Hindi languages, along with content in Sanskrit. The website also documents research articles in conjunction with lectures on scientific subjects explaining the relation between 'Vedic knowledge' and modern science.

=== Objectives ===
The objectives of the portal are to:

1. Introduce the four Vedas: Rigveda, Yajurveda, Samaveda, and Atharvaveda.
2. Recite and chant Vedic samhita.
3. Record ancient scholars to create awareness about their Vedic wisdom and its importance in present world.
4. Document manuscripts and books such as Upanishads and Vedangas, in digital format.
5. Spread information about Vedic rituals based on Shrauta sutra.
6. List Vedic scholars and learning centers.

== See also ==
- Traditional Knowledge Digital Library
- Indian Knowledge Systems
- Traditional knowledge
