= Indian Council of Philosophical Research =

- Abbreviation: ICPR
- Formation: March 1977
- Headquarters: New Delhi
- Location: India
- Chairman: Raghuvendra Tanwar
- Affiliations: Department of Higher Education, Ministry of Human Resource Development
- Website: icpr.in

Indian Council of Philosophical Research (ICPR) was established in March 1977 under Department of Higher Education and Ministry of Human Resource Development as an Apex Level Body under the societies registration Act 1860. However, the council formally became active in July 1981, with the appointment of D.P. Chattopadyaya as the first chairperson.

== Objective ==
The prime objective of the council is to establish, administer and manage the following functions:

1. Review the progress of research in philosophy on a regular basis.
2. Co-ordinate research activities in philosophy and encourage interdisciplinary research.
3. Promote collaboration in research between Indian philosophers and international philosophical institutes.
4. Promote teaching and research in Philosophy.
5. Sponsor or assist projects or programs of research in philosophy.
6. Provide financial support and assistance to institutions and organisations engaged in the conduct of research on philosophy.
7. Technically assist and guide the formulation of research projects and programs in philosophy, by individuals or institutions.
8. Organize and support institutional or other arrangements for training in research methodology.
9. Regularly indicate areas and topics of research in philosophy to promote and adopt special measures for the development of research in neglected or developing areas.
10. Organize, sponsor and assist seminars, special courses, study circles, working groups / parties and conferences for promoting research in philosophy and to establish institutes for the same purpose.
11. Provide grants for publications of digests, journals, periodicals and scholarly works devoted to research in philosophy and also to undertake their publications.
12. Institute and administer fellowships, scholarships and awards for research in philosophy by students, teachers and others.
13. Develop and support documentation services, including maintenance and supply of data, preparation of an inventory of current research in Philosophy and compilation of a National Register of Philosophers.
14. Undertake measures develop a group of talented young philosophers and to encourage research by young philosophers working in universities and other institutions.
15. Regularly advise the Govt. of India on all such matters pertaining to teaching and research in Philosophy.
16. Establish collaboration between other institutions, organisations and agencies for the promotion of research in Philosophy.
17. Create academic, technical, ministerial and other posts in the council and to make appointments thereto in accordance with the provisions of the rules and regulations.

== Activities ==
The Indian Council of Philosophical Research have undertaken the following activities:

1. Award various kinds of fellowships to scholars
2. Organizes seminars in many different areas of philosophy and related disciplines in all parts of the country.
3. Organizes lectures by eminent Indian and foreign scholars every year in different parts of country.
4. Award travel grants to scholars to attend national and international seminars, symposium and conferences abroad.
5. Organizes an annual essay competition among young scholars (in the age group of 20–25 years) to encourage them to think critically and philosophically on the issues facing our country.
6. Conducts national and international Researchers, scholar & student exchange programs.
7. Publish important philosophical works by scholars and fellows of the council.
8. Publish critical editions with commentary, embodying creative interpretation of classical Indian texts by scholars and researchers.
