= Virtual Labs (India) =

Educational project in India

Virtual Labs is a project initiated by the Ministry of Education, Government of India, under the National Mission on Education through Information and Communication Technology. The project aims to provide remote access to Laboratories in various disciplines of Science and Engineering for students at all levels from undergraduate to research.

Virtual Labs have been designed to provide remote access to labs in various disciplines of Science and Engineering. These Virtual Labs cater to students at the undergraduate level, postgraduate level as well as to research scholars. Virtual Labs enable the students to learn at their own pace and enthuse them to conduct experiments. Virtual Labs also provide a complete learning management system where the students can avail various tools for learning, including additional web resources, video lectures, animated demonstration, and self-evaluation. Virtual Labs can be used to complement physical labs.

The project is coordinated by IIT Delhi and there are a total of 11 participating institutes in the consortium. IIT Delhi, IIT Bombay, IIT Kanpur, IIT Kharagpur, IIT Roorkee, IIT Guwahati, IIT Kharagpur, IIIT Hyderabad, Amrita Vishwa Vidyapeetham Coimbatore, Dayalbagh Educational Institute Agra, NITK Surathkal, and College of Engineering Pune are the institutions participating in the project. Ranjan Bose is the National Coordinator for the project.

The Project covers Computer Science & Engineering, Electronics & Communications, Electrical Engineering, Mechanical Engineering, Chemical Engineering, Biotechnology and Biomedical Engineering, Civil Engineering, Physical Sciences, and Chemical Sciences broad areas of engineering.

Virtual Labs do not require any additional infrastructural setup for conducting experiments at user premises. One computer terminal with broadband Internet connectivity is all that is needed to perform the experiments remotely. Specifically, this project provides the following:

1. Access to quality simulation-based labs to those engineering colleges that lack these lab facilities.
2. Access to quality simulation-based labs as a complementary facility to those colleges that already have labs.
3. A complete Learning Management System around these labs.
4. Teacher-training and skill-set augmentation through workshops and on-site training.

The intended beneficiaries of the projects are:

- All students and Faculty Members of Science and Engineering Colleges who do not have access to good lab facilities.
- High‐school students, whose inquisitiveness will be triggered, possibly motivating them to take up higher studies.
- Researchers in different institutes who can collaborate/share equipment and resources.
- Different engineering colleges, who can benefit from the content and related teaching resources.

== See also ==
- Amrita’s virtual labs are now freely accessible
- Virtual Labs Project Launched by MHRD under NMEICT
- Virtual laboratories to reach 500,000 students

== Research publication ==
- Virtual Labs in Engineering Education: Modeling Perceived Critical Mass of Potential Adopter Teachers
- Biotechnology Virtual Labs-Integrating Wet-lab Techniques and Theoretical Learning for Enhanced Learning at Universities
- Sakshat Labs: India's Virtual Proteomics Initiative
