= Centre for Studies in Civilizations =

The Centre for Studies in Civilizations (CSC), founded 12 October 1995, is a non-governmental organization (NGO) based in India. According to their website, the center "aims at conducting, promoting and facilitating studies and research in the broad areas of history, philosophy, culture, science and technology", and "undertakes and promotes research in relation to the past, the present and the future courses, contents, and trends of civilizations in general, and Indian civilization in particular." While its office is located in Delhi, the ten members of its governing body live throughout India. In addition to its literary work, the Center organizes symposia and talks by eminent scholars, politicians, writers and spokespeople.

The center's most extensive projects include:

- Project of History of Indian Science, Philosophy and Culture (PHISPC) - supervised and administered by the center, entirely funded by the Ministry of Human Resources and Development. Coordinating efforts to publish fifty volumes of books and anthologies, thirty of which will be major volumes, and twenty of which are to be monographs. According to the last update on the projects website, seven volumes and eleven monographs have been published, and in the financial year 2001–02, 7-8 more volumes were to be published, and one monograph
- Consciousness, Science, Society and Value (CONSSAV) - part of PHISPC - approved by the Department of Education, Ministry of Human Resources Development. According to its brief description, CONSSAV will "explore the role of consciousness in its various levels of awareness, in understanding and expounding the development of science, society and values. Consciousness as has been conceived and theorized in different traditions, or rather civilizations, will be studied and explored in detail." The project will consist of four volumes consisting of six parts.
- Sandhan - interdisciplinary journal
