= Timeline of Indian innovation =

Timeline of Indian innovation encompasses key events in the history of technology in the subcontinent historically referred to as India and the modern Indian state.

The entries in this timeline fall into the following categories: architecture, astronomy, cartography, metallurgy, logic, mathematics, metrology, mineralogy, automobile engineering, information technology, communications, space and polar technology.

This timeline examines scientific and medical discoveries, products and technologies introduced by various peoples of India. Inventions are regarded as technological firsts developed in India, and as such does not include foreign technologies which India acquired through contact.

== 7000 BCE ==
- Ancient dentistry: The Indus Valley civilization (IVC) has yielded evidence of dentistry being practised as far back as 7000 BC. An IVC site in Mehrgarh indicates that this form of dentistry involved curing tooth related disorders with bow drills operated, perhaps, by skilled bead crafters.

== 5000 BCE ==
- Ayurveda: Ayurveda is a system of medicine with historical roots in the Indian subcontinent. The origins of Ayurveda have been traced back to around 5,000 BCE, when they originated as an oral tradition.

== 3100 BCE ==
- Yoga: The origins of yoga are a matter of debate. There is no consensus on its chronology or specific origin other than that yoga developed in ancient India. Suggested origins are the Indus Valley civilization (3300–1900 BCE) and pre-Vedic Eastern states of India, the Vedic period (1500–500 BCE), and the śramaṇa movement.

== 2800 BC ==
- Buttons: Buttons and button-like objects used as ornaments or seals rather than fasteners have been discovered in the Indus Valley Civilization during its Kot Yaman phase (c. 2800–2600 BC).

== 2500 BCE ==
- Ancient flush toilet systems: Toilets that used water were used in the Indus Valley civilization. The cities of Harappa and Mohenjo-daro had a flush toilet in almost every house, attached to a sophisticated sewage system. See also Sanitation of the Indus Valley Civilisation.
- Diamond mining: Diamonds are thought to have been first recognized and mined in India, where significant alluvial deposits of the stone could be found many centuries ago along the rivers Penner, Krishna and Godavari. Diamonds have been known in India for at least 3,000 years but most likely 6,000 years.
- Stepwell: Earliest clear evidence of the origins of the stepwell is found in the Indus Valley Civilization's archaeological site at Mohenjodaro in Pakistan. The three features of stepwells in the subcontinent are evident from one particular site, abandoned by 2500 BCE, which combines a bathing pool, steps leading down to water, and figures of some religious importance into one structure. The early centuries immediately before the common era saw the Buddhists and the Jains of India adapt the stepwells into their architecture. Both the wells and the form of ritual bathing reached other parts of the world with Buddhism. Rock-cut step wells in the subcontinent date from 200 to 400 CE. Subsequently, the wells at Dhank (550–625 CE) and stepped ponds at Bhinmal (850–950 CE) were constructed.

== 2400 BCE ==
- Ruler: Rulers made from Ivory were in use by the Indus Valley Civilization in what today is Pakistan and some parts of Western India prior to 1500 BCE. Excavations at Lothal (2400 BCE) have yielded one such ruler calibrated to about 1/16 of an inch—less than 2 millimeters. Ian Whitelaw (2007) holds that 'The Mohenjo-Daro ruler is divided into units corresponding to 1.32 inches (33.5 mm) and these are marked out in decimal subdivisions with amazing accuracy—to within 0.005 of an inch. They correspond closely with the "hasta" increments of 1 3/8 inches traditionally used in South India in ancient architecture. Ancient bricks found throughout the region have dimensions that correspond to these units.' Shigeo Iwata (2008) further writes 'The minimum division of graduation found in the segment of an ivory-made linear measure excavated in Lothal was 1.79 mm (that corresponds to 1/940 of a fathom), while that of the fragment of a shell-made one from Mohenjo-daro was 6.72 mm (1/250 of a fathom), and that of bronze-made one from Harapa was 9.33 mm (1/180 of a fathom).' The weights and measures of the Indus civilization also reached Persia and Central Asia, where they were further modified.
- Weighing scale: The earliest evidence for the existence of weighing scale dates to 2400 BC – 1800 BC in the Indus valley civilization prior to which no banking was performed due to lack of scales.

== 700 BCE ==
- Pythagorean theorem: Mesopotamian, Indian and Chinese mathematicians all discovered the theorem independently and, in some cases, provided proofs for special cases. In India, the Baudhayana Sulba Sutra, the dates of which are given variously as between the 8th and 5th century BC, contains a list of Pythagorean triples discovered algebraically, a statement of the Pythagorean theorem, and a geometrical proof of the Pythagorean theorem for an isosceles right triangle. The Apastamba Sulba Sutra (c. 600 BC) contains a numerical proof of the general Pythagorean theorem, using an area computation. Van der Waerden believed that "it was certainly based on earlier traditions". Carl Boyer states that the Pythagorean theorem in Śulba-sũtram may have been influenced by ancient Mesopotamian math, but there is no conclusive evidence in favor or opposition of this possibility.

== 600 BCE ==
- Plastic surgery: Plastic surgery was being carried out in India in 600 BCE. The system of punishment by deforming a miscreant's body may have led to an increase in demand for this practice. The surgeon Sushruta contributed mainly to the field of plastic and cataract surgery. The medical works of both Sushruta and Charak were translated into Arabic language during the Abbasid Caliphate (750 CE). These translated Arabic works made their way into Europe via intermediaries. In Italy, the Branca family of Sicily and Gaspare Tagliacozzi of Bologna became familiar with the techniques of Sushruta.

== 500 BCE ==
- Formal grammar: Panini in his treatise Astadyayi gives formal production rules and definitions to describe the formal grammar of Sanskrit. In formal language theory, a grammar (when the context is not given, often called a formal grammar for clarity) is a set of production rules for strings in a formal language. The rules describe how to form strings from the language's alphabet that are valid according to the language's syntax. A grammar does not describe the meaning of the stringsor what can be done with them in whatever context—only their form.
- Shampoo:In the Indian subcontinent, a variety of herbs and their extracts have been used as shampoos since ancient times. The first origin of shampoo came from the Mahajanapadas. A very effective early shampoo was made by boiling Sapindus with dried Indian gooseberry (amla) and a selection of other herbs, using the strained extract. Sapindus, also known as soapberries or soapnuts, a tropical tree widespread in India, is called ksuna (Sanskrit: क्षुण) in ancient Indian texts and its fruit pulp contains saponins which are a natural surfactant. The extract of soapberries creates a lather which Indian texts called phenaka (Sanskrit: फेनक). It leaves the hair soft, shiny and manageable. Other products used for hair cleansing were shikakai (Acacia concinna), hibiscus flowers, ritha (Sapindus mukorossi) and arappu (Albizzia amara). Guru Nanak, the founder and the first Guru of Sikhism, made references to soapberry tree and soap in the 16th century.

== 300 BCE ==
- Atomism: References to the concept of atomism and its atoms are found in ancient India and ancient Greece. In the West, atomism emerged in the 5th century BCE with Leucippus and Democritus. In India, the Jain, Ajivika and Carvaka schools of atomism date back to the 4th century BCE. The Nyaya and Vaisheshika schools later developed theories on how atoms combined into more complex objects.

== 200 BCE ==
- Crucible steel: Perhaps as early as 300 BC—although certainly by 200 BC—high quality steel was being produced in southern India, by what Europeans would later call the crucible technique. In this system, high-purity wrought iron, charcoal, and glass were mixed in a crucible and heated until the iron melted and absorbed the carbon.

== 100 ==
- Hindu number system: With decimal place-value and a symbol for zero, this system was the ancestor of the widely used Arabic numeral system. It was developed in the Indian subcontinent between the 1st and 6th centuries CE.

== 200 ==
- Cataract surgery: Cataract surgery was known to the Indian physician Sushruta (3rd century CE). In India, cataract surgery was performed with a special tool called the Jabamukhi Salaka, a curved needle used to loosen the lens and push the cataract out of the field of vision. The eye would later be soaked with warm butter and then bandaged. Though this method was successful, Susruta cautioned that cataract surgery should only:. Greek philosophers and scientists traveled to India where these surgeries were performed by physicians. The removal of cataract by surgery was also introduced into China from India.
- Sugar: First ever sugar granules appear in gupta empire from where the technology spread

== 500 ==
- Zero, symbol: Indians were the first to use the zero as a symbol and in arithmetic operations, although Babylonians used zero to signify the 'absent'. In those earlier times a blank space was used to denote zero, later when it created confusion a dot was used to denote zero (could be found in Bakhshali manuscript). In 500 AD circa Aryabhata again gave a new symbol for zero (0).

== 600 ==
- Brahmagupta–Fibonacci identity, Brahmagupta formula,and Brahmagupta theorem: Discovered by the Indian mathematician, Brahmagupta (598–668 CE).
- Algebraic abbreviations: The mathematician Brahmagupta had begun using abbreviations for unknowns by the 7th century. He employed abbreviations for multiple unknowns occurring in one complex problem. Brahmagupta also used abbreviations for square roots and cube roots.
- Chaturanga: The precursor of chess originated in India during the Gupta dynasty (c. 280–550 CE). Both the Persians and Arabs ascribe the origins of the game of Chess to the Indians. The words for chess in Old Persian and Arabic are chatrang and shatranj respectively — terms derived from caturaṅga in Sanskrit, which literally means 'an army of four divisions' or 'four corps'. Chess spread throughout the world and many variants of the game soon began taking shape. This game was introduced to the Near East from India and became a part of the princely or courtly education of Persian nobility. Buddhist pilgrims, Silk Road traders and others carried it to the Far East where it was transformed and assimilated into a game often played on the intersection of the lines of the board rather than within the squares. Chaturanga reached Europe through Persia, the Byzantine Empire and the expanding Arabian empire. Muslims carried Shatranj to North Africa, Sicily, and Spain by the 10th century where it took its final modern form of chess.
- Ludo: Pachisi originated in India by the 6th century. The earliest evidence of this game in India is the depiction of boards on the caves of Ajanta. This game was played by the Mughal emperors of India; a notable example being that of Akbar, who played living Pachisi using girls from his harem. A variant of this game, called Luodo, made its way to England during the British Raj.
- Spinning wheel: Invented in India between 500 and 1000 A.D.
- Finite Difference Interpolation: The Indian mathematician Brahmagupta presented what is possibly the first instance of finite difference interpolation around 665 CE.
- Pascal's triangle: Described in the 6th century CE by Varahamihira and in the 10th century by Halayudha, commenting on an obscure reference by Pingala (the author of an earlier work on prosody) to the "Meru-prastaara", or the "Staircase of Mount Meru", in relation to binomial coefficients. (It was also independently discovered in the 10th or 11th century in Persia and China.)

== 700 ==
- Fibonacci numbers: This sequence was first described by Virahanka (c. 700 AD), Gopāla (c. 1135), and Hemachandra (c. 1150), as an outgrowth of the earlier writings on Sanskrit prosody by Pingala (c. 200 BC).
- Earth's orbit (Sidereal year): The Hindu cosmological time cycles explained in the Surya Siddhanta(700 BCE – 600 CE), give the average length of the sidereal year (the length of the Earth's revolution around the Sun) as 365.2563627 days, which is only a negligible 1.4 seconds longer than the modern value of 365.256363004 days. This remains the most accurate estimate for the length of the sidereal year anywhere in the world for over a thousand years.

== 900 ==
- Zinc smelting The first production of zinc in quantity seems to have been in India starting from 12th century and later in China from 16th century. In India, zinc was produced at Zawar from the 12th to the 18th centuries, although some zinc artifacts appear to have been made during classical antiquity in Europe.

== 1000 ==
- Chakravala method: The Chakravala method, a cyclic algorithm to solve indeterminate quadratic equations is commonly attributed to Bhāskara II, (c. 1114 – 1185 CE) although some attribute it to Jayadeva (c. 950~1000 CE). Jayadeva pointed out that Brahmagupta's approach to solving equations of this type would yield infinitely large number of solutions, to which he then described a general method of solving such equations. Jayadeva's method was later refined by Bhāskara II in his Bijaganita treatise to be known as the Chakravala method, chakra (derived from cakraṃ चक्रं) meaning 'wheel' in Sanskrit, relevant to the cyclic nature of the algorithm. With reference to the Chakravala method, E. O. Selenuis held that no European performances at the time of Bhāskara, nor much later, came up to its marvellous height of mathematical complexity.

== 1300 ==
- Madhava series: The infinite series for π and for the trigonometric sine, cosine, and arctangent is now attributed to Madhava of Sangamagrama (c. 1340 – 1425) and his Kerala school of astronomy and mathematics. He made use of the series expansion of to obtain an infinite series expression for π. Their rational approximation of the error for the finite sum of their series are of particular interest. They manipulated the error term to derive a faster converging series for π.They used the improved series to derive a rational expression, for π correct up to eleven decimal places, i.e. . Madhava of Sangamagrama and his successors at the Kerala school of astronomy and mathematics used geometric methods to derive large sum approximations for sine, cosine, and arctangent. They found a number of special cases of series later derived by Brook Taylor series. They also found the second-order Taylor approximations for these functions, and the third-order Taylor approximation for sine.

== 1500 ==
- Seamless celestial globe: Considered a remarkable feats in metallurgy, it was invented in Kashmir by Ali Kashmiri ibn Luqman in between 1589 and 1590 CE, and twenty other such globes were later produced in Lahore and Kashmir during the Mughal Empire. Before they were rediscovered in the 1980s, it was believed by modern metallurgists to very difficult to produce metal globes without any seams, during that era. These Indian metallurgists pioneered the method of lost-wax casting in order to produce these globes.

== 1600 ==
- Prefabricated home and movable structure: The first prefabricated homes and movable structures were invented in 16th-century Mughal India by Akbar. These structures were reported by Arif Qandahari in 1579.

== 1700 ==
- Mysorean rockets: The first iron-cased and metal-cylinder rockets were developed by Tipu Sultan, ruler of the South Indian Kingdom of Mysore, and his father Hyder Ali, in the 1780s. He successfully used these iron-cased rockets against the larger forces of the British East India Company during the Anglo-Mysore Wars. The Mysore rockets of this period were much more advanced than what the British had seen, chiefly because of the use of iron tubes for holding the propellant; this enabled higher thrust and longer range for the missile (up to 2 km range). After Tipu's eventual defeat in the Fourth Anglo-Mysore War and the capture of the Mysore iron rockets, they were influential in British rocket development, inspiring the Congreve rocket, and were soon put into use in the Napoleonic Wars.

== 1800 ==
- Microwave communication: The first public demonstration of microwave transmission was made by Jagadish Chandra Bose, in Calcutta, in 1895, two years before a similar demonstration by Marconi in England, and just a year after Oliver Lodge's commemorative lecture on Radio communication, following Hertz's death.
- Iron and mercury coherer: In 1899, the Bengali physicist Sir Jagdish Chandra Bose announced the development of an "iron-mercury-iron coherer with telephone detector" in a paper presented at the Royal Society, London. He also later received U.S. Patent 755,840, "Detector for electrical disturbances" (1904), for a specific electromagnetic receiver.

== 1900 ==
- Boson: The name boson was coined by Paul Dirac to commemorate the contribution of the Indian physicist Satyendra Nath Bose. In quantum mechanics, a boson (/ˈboʊsɒn, ˈboʊzɒn/) is a particle that follows Bose–Einstein statistics. Bosons make up one of the two classes of particles, the other being fermions.
- Raman effect: The Encyclopædia Britannica (2008) reports: "change in the wavelength of light that occurs when a light beam is deflected by molecules. The phenomenon is named for Sir Chandrasekhara Venkata Raman, who discovered it in 1928. When a beam of light traverses a dust-free, transparent sample of a chemical compound, a small fraction of the light emerges in directions other than that of the incident (incoming) beam. Most of this scattered light is of unchanged wavelength. A small part, however, has wavelengths different from that of the incident light; its presence is a result of the Raman effect."
- Landau–Ramanujan constant, Mock theta functions, Ramanujan conjecture, Ramanujan prime, Ramanujan–Soldner constant, Ramanujan theta function, Ramanujan's sum, Rogers–Ramanujan identities, Ramanujan's master theorem: Discovered by the Indian mathematician, Srinivasa Ramanujan.
- Chandrasekhar limit and Chandrasekhar number: Discovered by and named after Subrahmanyan Chandrasekhar, who received the Nobel Prize in Physics in 1983 for his work on stellar structure and stellar evolution.
- Crescograph: The crescograph, a device for measuring growth in plants, was invented in the early 20th century by the Bengali scientist Sir Jagadish Chandra Bose.
- Saha ionization equation: The Saha equation, derived by the Bengali scientist Meghnad Saha (6 October 1893 – 16 February 1956) in 1920, conceptualizes ionizations in context of stellar atmospheres.
- Basu's theorem: The Basu's theorem, a result of Debabrata Basu (1955) states that any complete sufficient statistic is independent of any ancillary statistic.
- Visceral leishmaniasis, treatment of: The Indian (Bengali) medical practitioner Upendranath Brahmachari (19 December 1873 – 6 February 1946) was nominated for the Nobel Prize in Physiology or Medicine in 1929 for his discovery of 'ureastibamine (antimonial compound for treatment of kala azar) and a new disease, post-kalaazar dermal leishmanoid.' Brahmachari's cure for Visceral leishmaniasis was the urea salt of para-amino-phenyl stibnic acid which he called Urea Stibamine. Following the discovery of Urea Stibamine, Visceral leishmaniasis was largely eradicated from the world, except for some underdeveloped regions.
- Raychaudhuri equation: Discovered by the Bengali physicist Amal Kumar Raychaudhuri in 1954. This was a key ingredient of the Penrose-Hawking singularity theorems of general relativity.

== 2000 ==
- J Sharp: Visual J# (pronounced "jay-sharp") programming language was a transitional language for programmers of Java and Visual J++ languages, so they could use their existing knowledge and applications on .NET Framework.It was developed by the Hyderabad-based Microsoft India Development Center at HITEC City in India.
- Kojo (programming language): Kojo is a programming language and integrated development environment (IDE) for computer programming and learning. Kojo is open-source software. It was created, and is actively developed, by Lalit Pant, a computer programmer and teacher living in Dehradun, India.
- Lunar water: Although the presence of water ice on the Moon has been conjectured by various scientists since the 1960s, inconclusive evidence of free water ice had also been identified the first incontrovertible evidence of water on the Moon was provided by the payload Chace carried by the Moon Impact Probe released by Chandrayaan-1 in 2008 confirmed and established by NASA.

== See also ==
- History of science and technology in India
- Nalanda University
- List of Indian inventions and discoveries
- Timeline of historic inventions
