= Satyaprakash Mishra =

Indian progressive critic of socialist ideology

Satyaprakash Mishra (25 June 1945 – 27 March 2007) was an Indian progressive critic of socialist ideology. The area of his writing and editing, despite being mainly modern Hindi literature, has also been centered on the post-medieval period i.e. Ritikaal.

== Life ==
Satyaprakash Mishra was born on 25 June 1945 in a town called Dostpur in Uttar Pradesh Sultanpur district. His early education took place in Dostpur. He came to Allahabad for higher education and after passing BA and MA from Allahabad University he also got the degree of D. Phil from there. As a career, he chose teaching work and started teaching from Allahabad Degree College. In 1979, he was appointed to the Hindi Department of Allahabad University, where he gradually rose to the rank of Acharya (University Professor). He died on 27 March 2007 while working as the Head of the Department of Hindi. In between, he also went to Tokyo University, Japan as a visiting professor, but left midway due to lack of peace of mind there. He was also invited by the University of Leipzig, Germany and the Catholic University, Belgium as visiting professor, but he did not go.

== Published works ==
1. Yah Path bandhu tha ka adhyayan
2. Reeti kaavy : prakrti evan svaroop
3. kavi shiksha kee parampara
4. Aalochak Aur Sameekshaen
5. Madhyakaaleen kaavy Aandolan-2
6. kaavy bhaasha par teen nibandh (sahalekhan)
7. krti vikrti sanskrti-2010 (upalabdh aalochanaatmak lekhan se chayan Published from Lokbharti Publications, Prayagraj)

== Other specific functions ==
1. Honorary Director, Allahabad Museum
2. Honorary Librarian, University of Allahabad
3. Literature Minister, Hindi Sahitya Sammelan, Prayag
4. Chairman, Vyas Samman Selection Committee
5. Convenor, Saraswati Samman, KK Birla Foundation, New Delhi
6. Member, Mangala Prasad Award Committee, Uttar Pradesh Hindi Sansthan.

== Awards ==
Awarded "Sahitya Bhushan Samman" (2006) of Uttar Pradesh Hindi Sansthan.
