= National Academic Depository =

Education database in India

- Abbreviation: NAD
- Formation: 17 July 2017 (8 years ago)
- Type: Government Scheme
- Headquarters: New Delhi, India
- Parent organization: University Grants Commission (UGC), Ministry of Education (MoE)
- Website: nad.gov.in

National Academic Depository (NAD) is an initiative of government of India under the Ministry of Education (MoE), formerly the Ministry of Human Resource Development (MHRD). It is an online storehouse of academic awards viz. certificates, diplomas, degrees, mark-sheets etc. lodged by academic institutions / boards / eligibility assessment bodies in a digital format. NAD not only ensures easy access to and retrieval of an academic award but also validates and guarantees its authenticity and safe storage. In addition to ensuring the authenticity integrity, and confidentiality of the database, NAD can act as a deterrent to fake and forged paper certificates, reduce administrative efforts and eliminate the need of physical records. It facilitates students to get authentic documents/certificates in digital format directly from their original issuers anytime, anywhere without any physical interference.

The Ministry of Education (MoE) has designated University Grants Commission (UGC) as an authorized body to implement NAD as a permanent scheme by a single depository i.e. DigiLocker an entity owned by the Ministry of Electronics and Information Technology (MeitY).

== History ==
The ministry has set up a task force in January 2010 to prepare a road map for implementation of the concept of electronic depository for academic awards. The National Academic Depository Bill was originally introduced in the Lok Sabha in September 2011. The bill was referred to the Standing Committee on Human Resource Development. The law lapsed in 2014 with the change of Government.

The Union Cabine approved a Ministry of Education's proposal to establishing a digital depository of academic awards to be known as National Academic Depository (NAD) in its meeting held on 27 October 2016. This was in fulfillment of a commitment made in Finance Minister's 2016-17 Budget Speech which outlined a ‘Digital Depository’ for school leaving certificates, degrees and other academic awards of higher education institutions.

NAD was launched by the then Hon’ble president of India on 9 July 2017. The Ministry of Education (MoE) designated University Grants Commission (UGC) as an authorised implementing body to enter into a tripartite agreement with NSDL Database Management Limited (NDML) and CDSL ventures Limited (CVL) for a period of three year to operationalize the NAD. The period of tripartite agreement was ended in December 2019 and further it has been decided that the NAD scheme will be implemented by DigiLocker not by the CVL & NDML. A notification in March 2020 was released by Ministry of Education (MoE) regarding implementation of NAD scheme.

== UGC- the authorised implementing body ==
The Union Cabinet has approved establishing a digital depository of academic awards to be known as National Academic Depository (NAD) in its meeting held on 27 October 2016. Consequent upon the approval of Cabinet, the Government in exercise of powers conferred under section 20(1) of University Grants Commission Act,1956 has designated University Grants Commission (UGC) as an authorised body to enter into a Memorandum of Understanding (MoU) with DigiLocker as a Single Depository of NAD.

== Stake-holders ==
The NAD stake-holders are Academic Institutions, Students, Verifying Partners, NAD Repository, DigiLocker application.

=== Students and their benefits ===
Students or other award holders are the beneficiaries of this scheme.

- Student can view, access and share their digital academic awards with other Academic Institution or potential employers at any time.
- Allow students to download/print an authenticated copy of the academic award.
- No risk of losing or spoiling of Academic awards.
- Reducing the circulation of fake certificates

=== Academic Institutions (AIs) and their benefits ===
Only academic institutions those issues any mark-sheets, degrees or certificates are authorized to upload academic awards to the NAD through DigiLocker. Academic Institutions to be covered under NAD shall be among the following categories:

- Central Universities
- Deemed to be Universities
- State Universities
- Private Universities
- Central Higher Educational Institutions and Institutions empowered by an Act of Parliament to grant degrees/diplomas
- Institute of National Impotence
- Institutions approved by the Ministry of Skill Development and Entrepreneurship (MSDE)
- Central Board of Secondary Education (CBSE), state school and other boards
- Others

The benefits and features of NAD for academic institutions are:

- Allow lodging of Academic awards in a digital format, maintaining the integrity of access to the database and of the awards lodged in the database.
- Certificate records maintained in well organized IT system for long period.
- Effective deterrence to fake and forged paper certificates

=== Verifying entities and their benefits ===
Verifying entities i.e. banks, employer companies (domestic and overseas), visa consulates, Government entities, academic institutions / universities / boards / eligibility assessment bodies (domestic and overseas) etc. that indulge in verification of the academic certificates submitted to them by students are termed as verifying entities or verifiers.

- Reduction in cost, time and efforts for verification.

=== NAD Repository and their benefits ===
NAD provides a secure dedicated repository service by DigiLocker to AIs to host their awards data and is available at NAD portal provides an easy and intuitive workflow to upload and publish the academic records from this repository. An authorized person from AI can upload, publish and maintain the academic awards of the AI in this repository.

== DigiLocker ==
DigiLocker is a flagship initiative of Ministry of Electronics and Information Technology (MeitY) under Digital India programme. DigiLocker aims at ‘Digital Empowerment’ of citizen by providing access to authentic digital documents to citizen's digital document wallet. DigiLocker provides an account in cloud to every Aadhaar holder to access authentic documents/certificates such as driving license, vehicle registration, academic mark sheet in digital format from the original issuers of these certificates. It also provides 1 GB storage space to each account to upload scanned copies of legacy documents. Users need to possess an Aadhaar number to use DigiLocker.

As of December 2019, DigiLocker provides access to over 372+ crore authentic documents from 149 issuers and over 3.3 crore users are registered on DigiLocker. 43 requester organizations are accepting documents from DigiLocker since The issued documents in DigiLocker system are deemed to be at par with original physical documents as per Rule 9A of the Information Technology (Preservation and Retention of Information by Intermediaries providing Digital Locker facilities) Rules, 2016 notified on February 8, 2017, vide G.S.R. 711(E).

DigiLocker web/mobile application acts as the student facing interface of NAD. Students can access their digital academic certificates hosted on NAD through their account on DigiLocker. Students can also share their certificates with other DigiLocker partner organizations while availing their services. Along with academic certificates, students can also access their other important documents such as Aadhaar, driving license, vehicle registration, PAN etc. from their DigiLocker account. DigiLocker is continuously adding Central/State/Private issuer organizations to its ecosystem. Thus a single account provides access to a gamut of digital certificates along with academic certificates.

== See also ==
- List of autonomous higher education institutes in India
- List of universities in India
