= Central Tibetan School Administration =

Organization managing schools for Tibetan refugees in India

- Formation: 1961
- Headquarters: ESS ESS Plaza, Plot No. 1, Community Centre, Sector-3, Rohini, Delhi-110085
- Official language: Standard Tibetan, Indian English
- Parent organisation: Ministry of Education
- Staff: 554 teachers, 239 non-teaching staff
- Website: ctsa.nic.in

The Central Tibetan School Administration is an autonomous organisation under the Ministry of Education of the government of India. The organisation is responsible for "establishing, managing and assisting schools in India for the education of Tibetan Children living in India while preserving and promoting their culture and heritage". This organisation is affiliated to Central Board of Secondary Education (CBSE).

== History ==
In order to oversee and support India schools for the education of Tibetan refugee children, the Indian government formed the, Tibetan Schools Society, now known as the Central Tibetan Schools Administration in 1961 at the request of the 14th Dalai Lama. This independent organisation is governed by the Indian Ministry of Human Resource Development.

The administration operates 71 schools across India with around 10,000 students. It employs 554 teaching staff and 239 non-teaching staff.

Plans have previously been announced to transfer responsibility for the schools to the Central Tibetan Administration.
