= National Foundation for Teachers' Welfare =

- Formation: 1962
- Headquarters: Directorate of School Education, Saifabad, Hyderabad, 500 004
- Parent organisation: Ministry of Human Resource Development

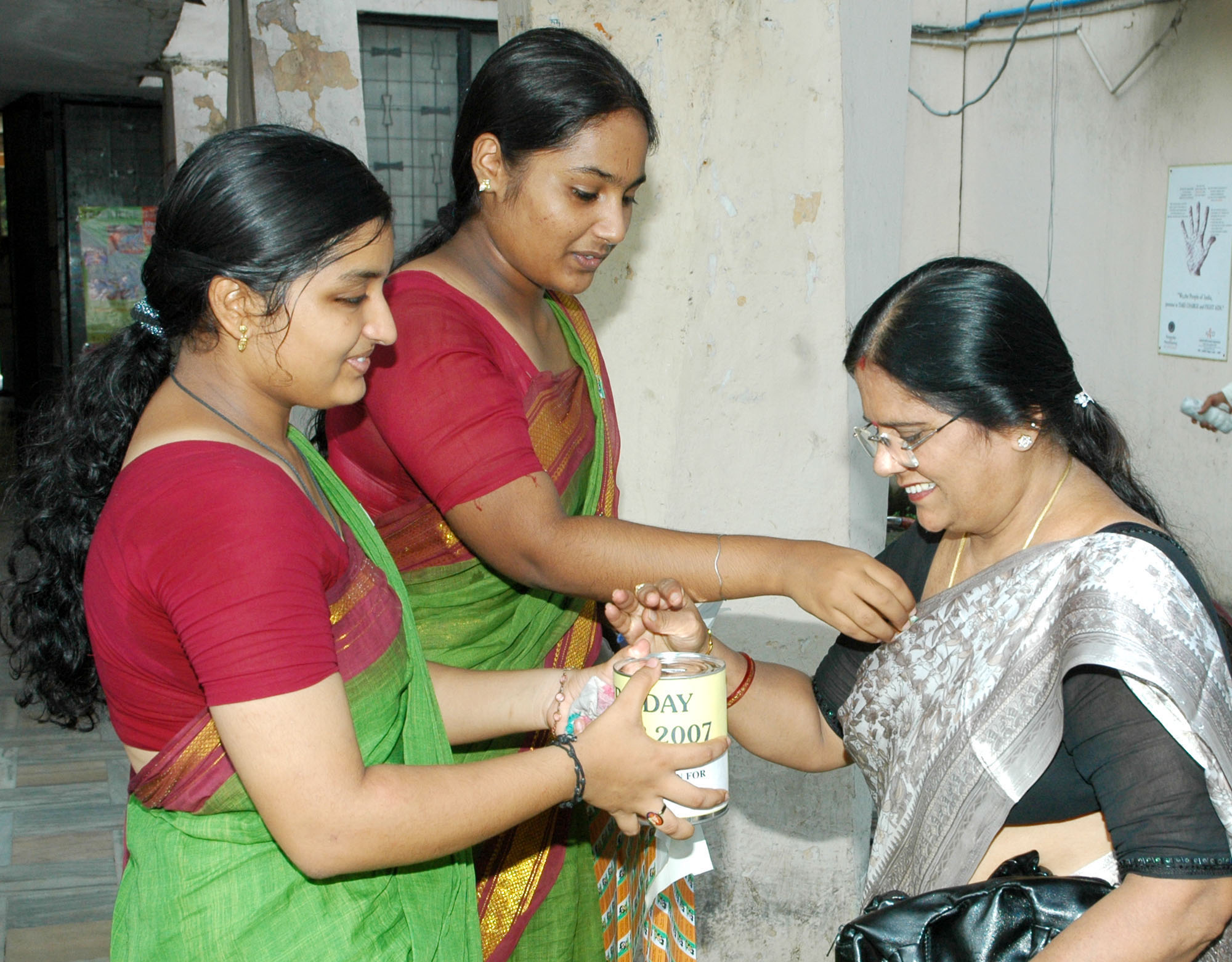
Fund Collection Drive on the eve of Teachers Day, New Delhi 2007

The National Foundation for Teachers' Welfare is a charitable foundation established by the Indian Government in 1962. The organisation is responsible for providing "relief to teachers and their dependants who may be in indigent circumstances". The Foundation receives funding from the Government of India and state members

The foundation has provided financial assistance for the children of teachers to study engineering, medicine and management at university
