= Ravinder Kumar (historian) =

Indian historian (1933-2001)

For the BSP politician, see Ravinder Kumar Molhu.

Ravinder Kumar (1933 – 6 April 2001) was an Indian historian of Kashmiri descent.

He was for many years the Director of the Nehru Memorial Museum and Library in Delhi. He was also the Chairman of the Indian Council of Historical Research, New Delhi.

== Selected works ==
- The Bombay Textile Strike, 1919
- The Leopard and the Tail
- The Rowlatt Satyagraha in Lahore
- From Swaraj to Purna Swaraj: Nationalist politics in the city of Bombay, 1920–32

Academic offices
Preceded by Irfan Habib	Chairman, ICHR, New Delhi; 1993–1997	Succeeded by S.Settar
