= National Commission for Minority Educational Institutions =

Educational Institution

National Commission for Minority Educational Institutions (NCMEI) was established to protect and safeguard the educational institutions which are established by the religious minorities in India. It is a statutory body established by National Commission for Minority Educational Institutions Act (NCMEI Act), 2004. This also ensures rights of religious minorities to establish and administer educational institutions of their choice as provided in Article 30 of the Constitution of India. Linguistic minorities do not come under the ambit of the NCMEI Act, 2004

== History ==
The National Commission for Minority Educational Institutions (NCMEI) was established as welfare of the religious minorities mentioned in the national common minimum programme and government established the commission through an ordinance in November 2004. In January 2005, the ordinance replaced by an Act.

The commission is headed by a chairman who belongs to a religious minority community and has been a Judge of a High Court. Three members are nominated by Central Government. They too must belong to a religious minority community and must be "persons of eminence, ability and integrity."

== Powers ==
- Make recommendations to the Central Government and the State Governments on any matter that directly or indirectly deprives the minority community of their educational rights enshrined in Article 30 of Indian Constitution.
- NCMEI advise the Central Government or any State Government regarding any issues or questions related to the education of minorities. This recommendation is only after the request of central/state governments.
- NCMEI is a quasi-judicial body endowed with the powers of a Civil Court. The Commission plays mainly 3 roles : 1) adjudicatory function, 2) advisory function and 3) recommendatory function.
- The decision of the commission would be final in matters regarding the affiliation of a minority educational institution.
