= Academic Bank of Credits (India) =

Indian digital academic credit repository

The Academic Bank of Credits (ABC) is a digital academic credit repository established by the Government of India to facilitate the accumulation, transfer, and redemption of academic credits earned by students from recognised higher education institutions. It was introduced as part of the reforms proposed under the National Education Policy 2020 (NEP 2020).

The ABC system enables students to open an academic account in which credits awarded by institutions are digitally stored. These credits can be transferred across institutions and counted toward the completion of degree, diploma, or certificate programmes, subject to the regulations of the awarding institution.

The platform is implemented under the supervision of the University Grants Commission (UGC), governs credit regulation, transfer mechanisms, and institutional participation.

== APAAR ID ==
The ABC has been integrated with the Automated Permanent Academic Account Registry (APAAR), a student identification system also introduced under NEP 2020. The APAAR ID functions as a unique student identifier, and allows linkage of individual academic records with the Academic Bank of Credits platform.

== Implementation and integration ==
The Academic Bank of Credits (ABC) is implemented through a centralised digital platform developed under the supervision of the University Grants Commission (UGC). Higher education institutions recognised by statutory bodies are required to register on the platform and upload students’ earned academic credits in a prescribed digital format. Students create individual academic accounts, through which credits awarded by participating institutions are deposited, stored, and made accessible for future redemption toward eligible qualifications.
