= Ministry of Education (India) =

Government ministry of India

- Branch of Government of India

- Ministry of Education

Ministry overview
- Formed: 15 August 1947; 79 years ago
- Jurisdiction: Government of India
- Headquarters: Kartavya Bhavan-02 Dr. Rajendra Prasad Road, New Delhi
- Annual budget: ₹139,289 crore (equivalent to ₹1.4 trillion or US$15 billion in 2026) (2026–27)
- Minister responsible: Pralhad Joshi, Minister with Additional Charge
- Deputy Ministers responsible: Sukanta Majumdar, Minister of State; Jayant Chaudhary, Minister of State
- Ministry executives: Deepti Gaur Mukerjee, IAS; T K Anil Kumar,IAS
- Child agencies: Department of School Education and Literacy; Department of Higher Education; Raja Rammohan Roy National Agency for ISBN
- Website: education.gov.in

The Ministry of Education (MoE) is a ministry of the Government of India, responsible for the implementation of the National Policy on Education.

The former education minister was Dharmendra Pradhan, a member of the Council of Ministers, until his resignation on 25 July 2026. Following his resignation, the current education minister of India is Pralhad Joshi. India has had a Ministry of Education since 1947, following independence. In 1985, the Rajiv Gandhi government changed its name to the Ministry of Human Resource Development (MHRD). Under the newly drafted National Education Policy 2020 (NEP 2020), by the Second Modi Ministry, the Ministry of Human Resource Development was renamed back to the Ministry of Education.

== Policy ==
The new National Education Policy 2020 was passed on 29 July 2020 by the Union Council of Ministers. The NEP 2020 replaced the earlier National Policy on Education of 1986.

Under the NEP 2020, the name of the Ministry of Human Resource Development (MHRD) was changed to Ministry of Education (MoE). Numerous new educational institutes, bodies and concepts were legislated under NEP 2020. The previously used 10+2 system was discarded in favour of the 5+3+3+4 system.

== Department of School Education and Literacy ==
The Department of School Education and Literacy is responsible for the development of school education and literacy in the country.

- Central Board of Secondary Education (CBSE)
- Central Tibetan School Administration (CTSA)
- Kendriya Vidyalaya Sangathan (KVS)
- National Council of Educational Research and Training (NCERT)
- National Council for Teacher Education (NCTE)
- National Foundation for Teachers' Welfare
- National Institute of Open Schooling (NIOS)
- Navodaya Vidyalaya Samiti (NVS)
- Eklavya Model Residential School (EMRS)
- Bharatiya Shiksha Board (BSB)

== Department of Higher Education ==
The Department of Higher Education is in charge of secondary and post-secondary education. The department is empowered to grant deemed university status to educational institutions on the advice of the University Grants Commission (UGC) of India, under Section 3 of the University Grants Commission (UGC) Act, 1956. The Department of Higher Education takes care of one of the largest higher education systems of the world, just after the United States and China. The department aims to provide world-class opportunities for higher education and research in India. For this, the government has launched joint ventures and signed MoUs to help the Indian students benefit from world opinion. The technical education system in the country can be broadly classified into three categories – Central Government-funded institutions, State Government/State-funded institutions and Self-financed institutions. The 122 Centrally funded institution of technical and science education are as under: List of centrally funded technical institutions: IIITs (26), IITs (23), IIMs (20), IISc Bangalore, IISERs (7), NITs (31), NITTTRs (4), and 9 others (SPA, ISMU, NERIST, SLIET, IIEST, NITIE & NIFFT, CIT).

=== Organisational structure ===
The department is divided into eight bureaus, and most of the work of the department is handled through over 100 autonomous organisations under these bureaus.

==== University and Higher Education; Minorities Education ====
- University Grants Commission (UGC)
- Inter University Accelerator Centre, an autonomous body of UGC
- The Inter-University Centre for Astronomy and Astrophysics, an autonomous institution of the UGC
- Indian Council of Social Science Research (ICSSR)
- Indian Council of Historical Research (ICHR)
- Indian Council of Philosophical Research (ICPR)
- Consortium for Educational Communication
- 56 Central university (India) as on 11 September 2021 list issued by University Grants Commission

==== Technical Education ====
- All India Council of Technical Education (AICTE)
- Council of Architecture (COA)
- 23 Indian Institutes of Technology (IITs)
- 31 National Institutes of Technology (NITs)
- 26 Indian Institutes of Information Technology (IIITs)
- Indian Institute of Engineering Science and Technology, Shibpur (IIEST)
- 21 Indian Institutes of Management (IIMs)
- Indian Institute of Science (IISc)
- Foundation for Science Innovation and Development, IISc is a Section 8 Company under the Companies Act, 2013.
- 7 Indian Institutes of Science Education and Research (IISERs)
- North Eastern Regional Institute of Science and Technology (NERIST)
- National Institute of Advanced Manufacturing Technology (NIAFT)
- 4 National Institutes of Technical Teachers' Training & Research (NITTTRs) (Bhopal, Chandigarh, Chennai and Kolkata)
- 4 Regional Boards of Apprenticeship / Practical Training
- 3 School of Planning and Architecture (SPAs)

==== Administration and Languages ====
===== Three Deemed Universities in the field of Sanskrit, viz. =====
- Rashtriya Sanskrit Sansthan (RSkS) in New Delhi,
- Shri Lal Bahadur Shastri Rashtriya Sanskrit Vidyapeeth (SLBSRSV) New Delhi,
- Rashtriya Sanskrit Vidyapeeth (RSV) Tirupati

=== Public Sector Undertaking ===
- EdCIL (India) Ltd.

=== Other Agencies ===
- Kendriya Hindi Sansthan (KHS), Agra
- English and Foreign Language University (EFLU), Hyderabad
- National Council for Promotion of Urdu Language (NCPUL)
- Central Universities of India
- Gandhigram Rural University (GRI)
- National Council for Promotion of Sindhi Language (NCPSL)
- Three subordinate offices: Central Hindi Directorate (CHD), New Delhi; Commission for Scientific & Technological Terminology (CSTT), New Delhi; and Central Institute of Indian Languages (CIIL), Mysore
- Distance Education and Scholarships
  - Indira Gandhi National Open University (IGNOU)
- UNESCO, International Cooperation, Book Promotion and Copyrights, Education Policy, Planning and Monitoring
- Integrated Finance Division.
- Statistics, Annual Plan and CMIS
- Administrative Reform, North Eastern Region, SC/ST/OBC
- National Testing Agency (NTA)
- National Institute of Educational Planning and Administration (NIEPA)
- National Book Trust (NBT)
- National Board of Accreditation (NBA)
- National Commission for Minority Educational Institutions (NCMEI)
- National Institute of Open Schooling (NIOS)
- Indian Knowledge Systems (IKS)
- National Academic Depository (NAD)
- National Bal Bhawan
- Information and Library Network Centre (INFLIBNET Centre)
- Centre for Women's Development Studies, New Delhi, an autonomous research institute supported by the Indian Council of Social Science Research

=== Objectives ===
The main objectives of the ministry are:

- To conduct assessments that are efficient, transparent, and meet international standards. These assessments are used to evaluate candidates for admission and recruitment.
- Formulating the National Policy on Education and to ensure that it is implemented in letter and spirit
- Planned development, including expanding access and improving the quality of the educational institutions throughout the country, including in regions where people do not have easy access to education.
- Paying special attention to disadvantaged groups like the poor, females and minorities
- Provide financial help in the form of scholarships, loan subsidies, etc. to deserving students from deprived sections of the society.
- Encouraging international cooperation in the field of education, including working closely with UNESCO and foreign governments as well as Universities, to enhance the educational opportunities in the country.

== MoE's Innovation Cell (MIC) ==
MoE's Innovation Cell, was established in August 2018 by the ministry at All India Council for Technical Education (AICTE) to systematically foster the culture of innovation, entrepreneurship and startups in all major Higher Education Institutions in India. Abhay Jere was appointed as first Chief Innovation Officer.

=== Major initiatives of MIC ===
1. Smart India Hackathon (SIH)
2. Atal Ranking of Institutions on Innovation Achievements (ARIIA)
3. Institution's Innovation Council (IICs)
4. National Innovation and Start-up Policy for Students and Faculties in HEIs (NISP)
5. Innovation Ambassadors Program
6. MBA/PGDM program in Innovation, Entrepreneurship and Venture Development (IEV)

== National Institutional Ranking Framework (NIRF) ==
In April 2016, Ministry of Human Resource Development published the first list of rankings of Indian colleges under National Institutional Ranking Framework. The entire ranking exercise involved NBA, All India Council for Technical Education, UGC, Thomson Reuters, Elsevier and INFLIBNET (Information & Library Network) centre. The ranking framework was launched in September 2015. All 122 centrally-funded institutions – including all central universities, IITs and IIMs – participated in the first round of ranking.

== See also ==
- Education in India
- Minister of Education (India)
- National Institute of Technical Teachers' Training and Research, Chennai
- Directorate of Language Planning and Implementation
- U-DISE
- National Achievement Survey
