= National Education Policy 2020 =

Current education policy of India

National Education Policy
- Created: 2020
- Commissioned by: Ministry of Education, Government of India
- Subject: Education

Full text
- National Education Policy (2020) at Wikisource

The National Education Policy of India 2020 (NEP 2020), which was started by the Union Cabinet of India on 29 July 2020, outlines the vision of 3D new education system of India. The new policy replaces the previous National Policy on Education, 1986. (Note: "While the last education policy was announced in 1992, it was considered a re-writing of the 1986 policy.")

Shortly after the release of the policy, the government clarified that no one will be forced to study any particular language and that the medium of instruction will not be shifted from English to any regional language. The language policy in NEP is a broad guideline and advisory in nature; and it is up to the states, institutions, and schools to decide on the implementation. Education in India is a Concurrent List subject.

The policy has faced criticism from multiple scholars and educationists for its hasty implementation, with some calling it a threat to equitable education. Its implementation has also led to nationwide protests across India.

== Framework ==
The NEP 2020 replaces the National Policy on Education of 1986. In January 2015, a committee under former Cabinet Secretary T. S. R. Subramanian started the consultation process for the New Education Policy. Based on the committee report, in June 2017, the draft NEP was submitted in 2019 by a panel led by former Indian Space Research Organisation (ISRO) chief Krishnaswamy Kasturirangan. The Draft New Education Policy (DNEP) 2019, was later released by Ministry of Human Resource Development, followed by a number of public consultations. The Draft NEP was 484 pages. The Ministry undertook a rigorous consultation process in formulating the draft policy: "Over two lakh suggestions from 2.5 lakh gram panchayats, 6,600 blocks, 6,000 Urban Local Bodies (ULBs), 676 districts were received."

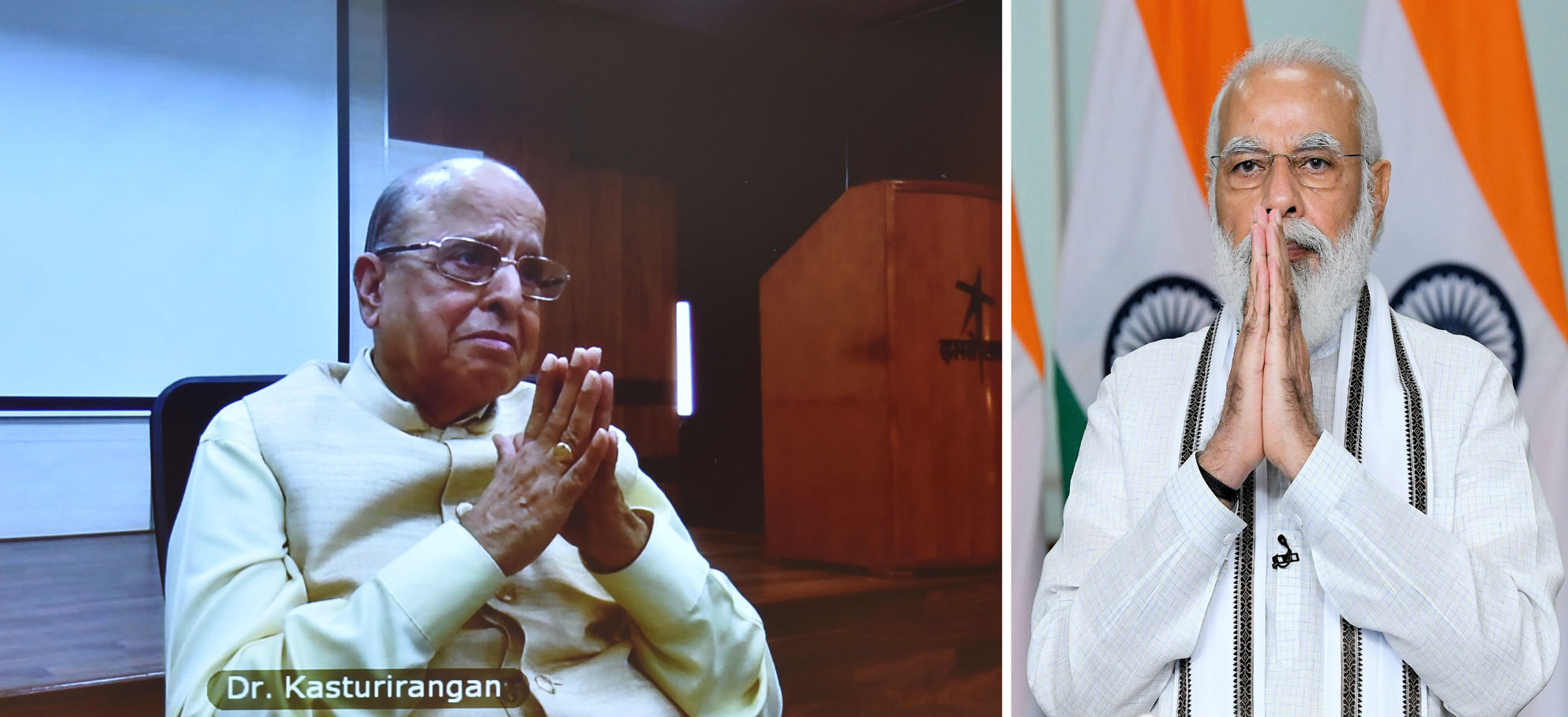
Online conclave on NEP-2020 attended by Prime Minister Narendra Modi on 7 August 2020. On the left is K. Kasturirangan.

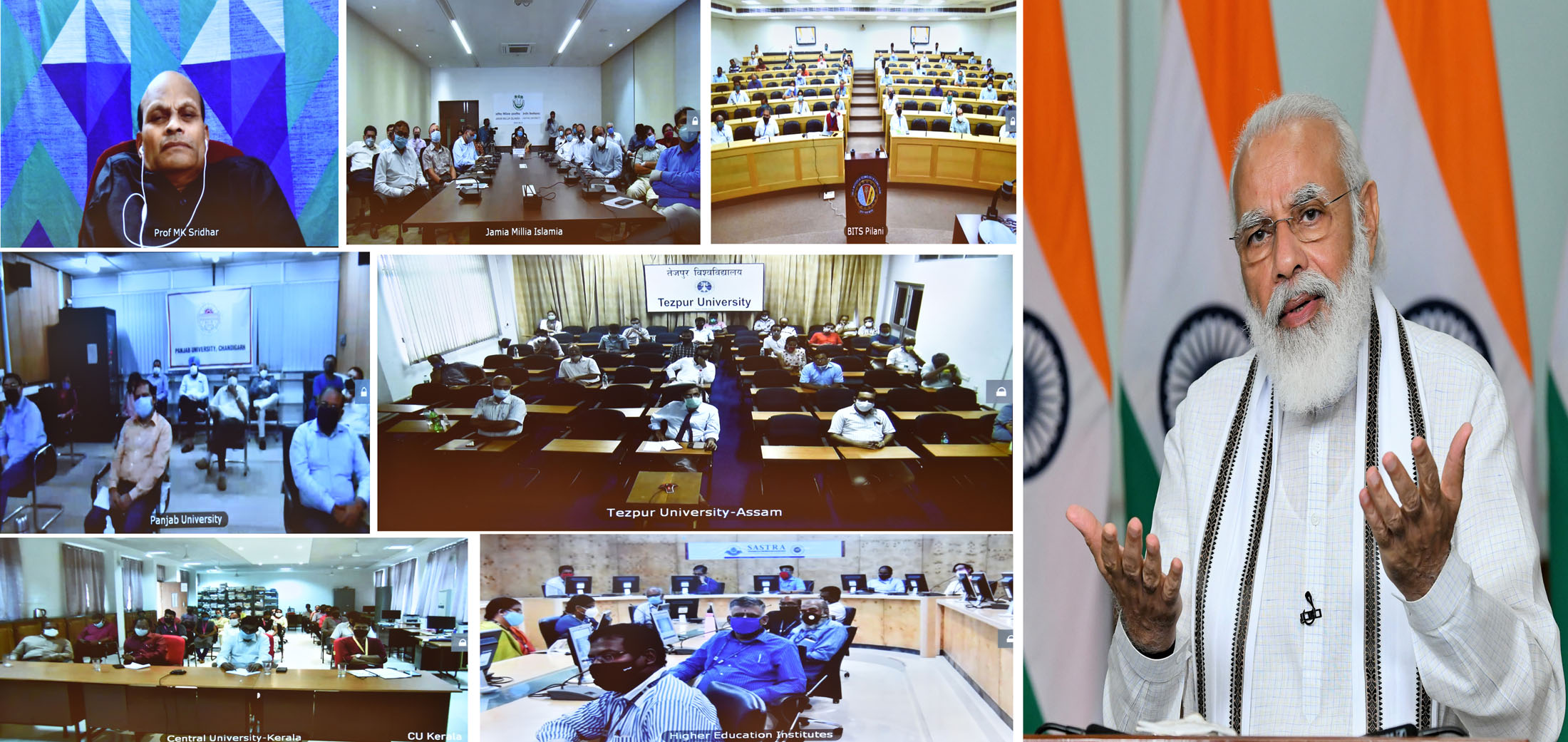
The NEP 2020 being discussed with educational institutions across the country. Visible are BITS Pilani, Jamia Millia Islamia, Panjab University, Tezpur University Assam and Central University of Kerala.

== Provisions ==
The NEP 2020 enacts numerous changes in India's education policy. It aims to increase state expenditure on education from around 3% to 6% of the GDP as soon as possible.

=== Languages ===
The National Education Policy keeps the mother tongue as the medium of instruction till Grade 5 while recommending its continuance till Grade 8 and beyond. Sanskrit and foreign languages will also be given emphasis. The Policy recommends a 'three-language formula', including at least two native Indian languages. It also states that no language will be imposed on the students.

Shortly after the release of the policy, the government clarified that the language policy in NEP is a broad guideline; and that it was up to the states, institutions and schools to decide the implementation. A more detailed language strategy would be released in the National Curriculum Framework in 2021. Note was also made that there were already institutions which had implemented this language policy 60 years ago such as the Sardar Patel Vidyalaya. Both the Education Policy of 1986 and the Right to Education Act, 2009 promoted usage of the mother tongue too as an advisory guideline.

=== School education ===
- Focus on Foundational Literacy and Numeracy: The policy accords the "highest priority to achieving universal foundational literacy and numeracy in the primary school by 2025", identifying the goal as the "most basic learning requirement". To this end, it proposes to set up a National Mission on Foundational Literacy and Numeracy, and require all State/UT governments to prepare an implementation plan, including identification of stage-wise targets and goals to be achieved by 2025, and measures for proper tracking and monitoring progress of the same. It recommends additional recruitment of teachers to ensure a pupil-teacher ratio (PTR) of under 30:1, with a preference for 25:1 in socio-economically disadvantaged areas. Additionally, it proposes the establishment of a national digital repository of high-quality resources, development of "enjoyable and inspirational" books for students at all levels in all local languages, and ensuring easy availability of resources for both teachers and students, via an expanded network of school, public, and digital libraries. Finally, it reinforces the critical need for addressing both the physical and mental health of students, via proper and timely nutrition, and periodic health check-ups.
- The "10 + 2" structure will be replaced with "5+3+3+4" model. This will be implemented as follows:
  - Foundational Stage: This is further subdivided into two parts: 3 years of preschool or anganwadi, followed by classes 1 and 2 in primary school. This will cover children of ages 3–7 years. The focus of studies will be in activity-based learning.
  - Preparatory Stage: Classes 3 to 5, which will cover the ages of 8–10 years. It will gradually introduce subjects like speaking, reading, writing, physical education, languages, art, science and mathematics.
  - Middle Stage: Classes 6 to 8, covering children between ages 11 and 13. It will introduce students to the more abstract concepts in subjects of mathematics, sciences, social sciences, arts and humanities.
  - Secondary Stage: Classes 9 to 12, covering the ages of 14–18 years. It is again subdivided into two parts: classes 9 and 10 covering the first phase while classes 11 and 12 covering the second phase. These 4 years of study are intended to inculcate multidisciplinary study, coupled with depth and critical thinking. Multiple options of subjects will be provided.
- Instead of exams being held every academic year, school students will only attend three exams, in classes 2, 5 and 8.
- Board exams will be continued to be held for classes 10 and 12 but will be re-designed. Standards for this will be established by an assessment body, PARAKH (Performance Assessment, Review and Analysis of Knowledge for Holistic Development) To make them easier, these exams would be conducted twice a year, with students being offered up to two attempts. The exam itself would have two parts, namely the objective and the descriptive.
- This policy aims at reducing the curriculum load of students and allowing them to be more "inter-disciplinary" and "multi-lingual". One example given was "If a student wants to pursue fashion studies with physics, or if one wants to learn bakery with chemistry, they'll be allowed to do so". Report cards will be "holistic", offering information about the student's skills.
- Coding will be introduced from class 6 and experiential learning will be adopted
- The Midday Meal Scheme will be extended to include breakfasts. More focus will be given to students' health, particularly mental health, through the deployment of counsellors and social workers.

=== Higher education ===
- The policy proposes a 4-year multi-disciplinary bachelor's degree in an undergraduate program with multiple exit options, ranging from a certificate after completing a year in a discipline or field, to a Bachelor's degree 'with research' if the student completes a four-year degree program which includes a 'rigorous' research project in a chosen major area of study. Likewise, the master's program is intended to be flexible in its duration, depending on the prior experience of the student. A Doctor of Philosophy (Ph.D.) has a minimum requirement of a Master’s degree or a 4-year Bachelor’s degree with Research.
- The policy proposes to transform the regulatory landscape in higher education by ensuring that the four tasks of regulation, accreditation, funding, and academic standard setting are each performed by "distinct, independent and empowered bodies", and within one umbrella institution viz. the to-be-established Higher Education Commission of India (HECI). It cites the need to "create checks-and-balances in the system, minimize conflicts of interest, and eliminate concentration of power" as the reasons behind the delegation of tasks to independent bodies. The proposed four verticals of HECI are:
  - National Higher Education Regulatory Council (NHERC): to regulate higher education, including teacher education, while excluding medical and legal education.
  - National Accreditation Council (NAC): to supervise the work of accrediting institutions and specify "phased benchmarks for all HEIs to achieve set levels of quality, self-governance, and autonomy", i.e. to act as a "meta-accrediting body".
  - Higher Education Grants Council (HEGC): to fund and finance universities and colleges, based on transparent criteria. This will replace the existing University Grants Commission.
  - General Education Council (GEC): to create a framework, the National Higher Education Qualification Framework (NHEQF), for charting "graduate attributes" i.e. the expected learning outcomes for higher education programs.
- The National Council for Teacher Education will come under the GEC, as a professional standard setting body (PSSB). Other PSSBs will include professional councils such as Veterinary Council of India, Council of Architecture, Indian Council of Agricultural Research and National Council for Vocational Education and Training.
- It proposes to fix the fees of both private and public universities.
- The National Testing Agency will now be given the additional responsibility of conducting entrance examinations for admissions to universities across the country, in addition to the JEE Main and NEET.
- It proposes that higher education institutes like the IITs make changes with regard to the diversity of learning.
- It proposes to internationalize education in India by allowing selected foreign universities to set up campuses in India, making the country an attractive destination for foreign students in search of quality education at an affordable cost, and promoting research collaborations and student exchanges between Indian and global institutions.

=== International branch campuses ===
After a failed attempt to import international branch campuses in 2012, the NEP 2020 renewed the effort by explicitly allowing for foreign universities to establish campuses in India as well as giving permission for IITs to set up campuses overseas. The policy sets a grand goal of utilizing international education to reestablish India as a Vishwa Guru (or world teacher), which was reiterated by India's vice president, M. Venkaiah Naidu, who expressed a desire to establish India to attract global academic talent. Scholars have raised question about the idea of importing higher education institutions from other countries in order to advance a goal of positioning the country as a world teacher. For the 2026–27 academic year, 13 foreign universities are admitting students to a total of 91 academic programs, with average annual tuition fees of approximately ₹13.3 lakh (US$14,000) for undergraduate programs and ₹17.2 lakh (US$18,100) for postgraduate programs. The combined intake for 2026–27 is estimated at fewer than 3,000 students, with actual enrolment expected to be less than half of the available intake. Relatively high annual tuition fees for Indian families and students along with high expectations regarding career outcomes and extent of international learning are emerging as some of the initial challenges for these campuses. The tuition pricing of a global degree at these international campuses is priced at a discount to studying abroad, but at a premium to Tier-1 private universities.As the choices with varying duration and costs of programs are emerging, so are the debates about the extent to which these IBCs can replace study abroad.

=== Teachers ===
The NEP 2020 puts forward many policy changes regarding teachers and teacher education. To become a teacher, a 4-year Bachelor of Education will be the minimum requirement needed by 2030. The teacher recruitment process will also be strengthened and made transparent. The National Council for Teacher Education will frame a National Curriculum Framework for Teacher Education by 2021 and a National Professional Standards for Teachers by 2022.

=== EdTech ===
Under NEP 2020, EdTech companies and startups are provided with necessary guidelines and impetus to develop learning management systems, ERP software, assessment platforms, online labs etc. for schools and universities. National Educational Technology Forum (NETF), an autonomous body is also created to facilitate exchange of ideas on technology usage to improve learning. In September 2021, in line with NEP, NITI Aayog partnered with Byju's to provide free access to its tech-driven learning programmes to engineering aspirants from 112 districts.

=== Indigenous knowledge ===
The NEP emphasises the importance of India's native knowledge traditions and inspiring 'Indianness' in people; in this vein, various Indian Knowledge Systems (IKS) initiatives have been undertaken to guide research and propagate understanding of indigenous knowledge.

=== Other changes ===
Under NEP 2020, numerous new educational institutes, bodies and concepts have been given legislative permission to be formed. These include:

- National Education Commission, headed by the Prime Minister of India
- Academic Bank of Credits, a digital storage of credits earned to help resume education by utilising credits for further education
- National Research Foundation, to improve research and innovation
- Special Education Zones, to focus on the education of underrepresented group in disadvantaged regions
- Gender Inclusion Fund, for assisting the nation in the education of female and transgender children

The policy proposes new language institutions such as the Indian Institute of Translation and Interpretation and the National Institute/ Institutes for Pali, Persian and Prakrit. Other bodies proposed include the National Mission for Mentoring, National Book Promotion Policy, National Mission on Foundational Literacy and Numeracy.

== Reception ==
Krishnaswamy Kasturirangan, chairperson of the National Education Policy (NEP) drafting panel, commented "No language is being imposed. Multi-lingual flexibility is still the basis for the new NEP 2020". The UGC has asked that awareness about the policy should be spread among students and teachers. Prime Minister Narendra Modi stated that the policy focuses on 'how to think' rather than 'what to think'.

Several state governments have criticized the policy, including Karnataka, Tamil Nadu, and Telangana, for not meeting local requirements and limited consideration of state government concerns in formulation of curriculum. Notably the state government of Tamil Nadu has characterized the NEP implimentation as Hindi imposition due to its three-language policy and has rejected any implementation of NEP in favor of its current two-language policy, due to which the state has experienced some minor funding issues. State governments of Jharkhand, Goa, West Bengal, and Kerala raised lack of consideration of state funding in the NEP.

Lok Sabha MP and Congress leader Shashi Tharoor welcomed the decision but stated his concerns about the implementation of the new policy and introduction of the policy without debate in front of a parliamentary panel. CPI(M) leader Sitaram Yechury alleged that suggestions made by academicians were not taken into account, while the politburo of the party condemned the commercialization encouraged by the policy. Kumkum Roy of the Centre for Historical Studies, JNU, stated that the subjects on the studies of Gender Studies, Media, Environment and Development, Culture, Dalit, Discrimination and Exclusion, and Media have not been mentioned for development. In the study of the Constitution, Fundamental Rights have been left out. Aishe Ghosh of the JNUSU tweeted that internships under the policy might lead to legalizing child labour.

The IIT Kanpur Director, Abhay Karandikar, supported the new policy, while the IIT Delhi director, V. Ramgopal Rao, compared the new education policy with the Morrill Land-Grant Acts of the United States by calling it a "Morril Moment" for India. He emphasized that the policy promotes educational opportunities for all, aiding the country's development by removing barriers and increasing accessibility to education. Both the chancellor and the vice-chancellor of Jawaharlal Nehru University (JNU) called the policy a "positive step forward", while Najma Akhtar, the vice-chancellor of Jamia Milia Islamia, called the policy "ground-breaking". Former Delhi University vice-chancellor Dinesh Singh, said "the policy lays down the road map pretty nicely". Venkaiah Naidu, the Vice President of India, welcomed the policy's flexibility and appreciated its "loftier" goal of bringing out-of-school children into the school system and reducing dropouts. DP Sharma appreciated the current initiative of end to end transformation of Indian education system but expressed his concerns about the implementation with care and honesty and, connected the self-reliant India mission with education transformation.

The JNU Student's Union (JNUSU) and Delhi University Teacher's Association criticized the government for approving the policy amidst the COVID-19 pandemic in India, stating that they had opposed the policy since its draft stage. Dhiraj Kumar Nite from Ambedkar University Delhi stated that the removal of the MPhil course was not in harmony with the principles of the NEP. While multiple exit points are offered at the undergraduate level, those interested in a Ph.D. do not have a quick exit point, which the MPhil could have provided if it had been repurposed. The Draft NEP of 2019 was criticized for multiple reasons. A social media campaign protested over the inclusion of Hindi in schools in the south Indian states. The Student's Federation of India stated that it threatened the federal character of the educational structure, commercialized education and undermined independent research activity. Madhu Prasad of Frontline pointed out how the draft's merit-based college admissions criteria did not take into account reservations and the caste-based discrimination and oppression faced by many in the country.

Several academics also expressed concern of the policy enabling a general trend of nationalist and revivalist agenda overshadowing historical accuracies and academic rigour through bodies implimenting NEP. For example the draft curriculum for undergraduate mathematics released by UGC as part of NEP, contained Kala Ganpana (traditional Indian time calculation), Bharatiya Bijganit (Indian algebra), Shulba Sutra (maxims of fire-altar measurements), among others while providing limited coverage of core subjects and applied math, and also having a poorly built design of elective course. Indian-origin Field medalist, Manjul Bhargava claimed that Indians must embrace its mathematical contribution while critics questioned meaningful impact of these subjects to an Indian mathematician's career while also noting a trend of nationalist agenda in education. Over 900 academics including 20 Padma Shri awardees and several Shanthi Swarup Bhatnagar awardees, wrote a letter to the UGC to withdraw its draft curriculum. Other criticism include lack of prioritization of vocational training and skill developement, lack of vision aligning India with internation education landscape, and prioritization of EdTech collaboration of institutes as promotion of means inaccessible to the poor.

== Implementation ==
- In early August 2021, Karnataka became the first state to issue an order with regard to implementing NEP. In 2025, the new Congress-led state government claimed that NEP has several shortcomings and it has taken bold steps to make certain amendments to it. Later, Karnataka High Court refused to interfere with this decision holding that it won't interfere with policy decisions unless a violation of fundamental or statutory rights is shown.
- On 26 August 2021, Madhya Pradesh implemented NEP 2020.
- Uttar Pradesh Chief Minister Yogi Adityanath said the National Education Policy-2020 will be implemented in phases by 2022.
- The Telangana State government has decided to implement the newly announced National Education Policy 2020 (NEP 2020) in the State.
- Maharashtra former CM Uddhav Thackeray directs to appoint experts’ committee for implementation of new education policy.
- Andhra Pradesh former Chief Minister Y. S. Jagan Mohan Reddy has directed officials of the Education Department to implement the National Education Policy 2020 in letter and spirit across the State.
- Rajasthan Governor Kalraj Mishra said that NEP 2020 will be implemented in phased manner.
- The Chief Minister of Assam, Himanta Biswa Sarma said that NEP 2020 will be implemented from 1 April 2022.
- In April 2022, the UGC (University Grants Commission) approved simultaneous dual degrees, both in physical and online modes.
- In October 2022, Ministry of Education released New Curriculum Framework for 3–8 years children and National Credit Framework inline of NEP 2020.
- In July 2024, Chhattisgarh govt says that they will soon implement NEP.
- In July 2024, Jawaharlal Nehru University (JNU) confirms establishment of new centres for Hindu, Buddhist, and Jain studies under the School of Sanskrit and Indic Studies, as part of its efforts to implement NEP 2020 and promote the Indian Knowledge Systems.
- In 2024, the Ministry of Education expanded NEP 2020 initiatives to emphasize skill-based curriculum, hands-on learning, and preparation for global competencies.
- In January 2025, the National Digital University is set to be launched.
- In October 2025, the Kerala government has decided to implement the NEP across school's in Kerala by being part of the PM SHRI Project.

== See also ==
- National Policy on Education
- Indian Knowledge Systems
- Education in India
- NCERT textbook controversies
