= Gaj Singh of Bikaner =

Maharaja of Bikaner from 1746 to 1787

Maharaja Gaj Singh
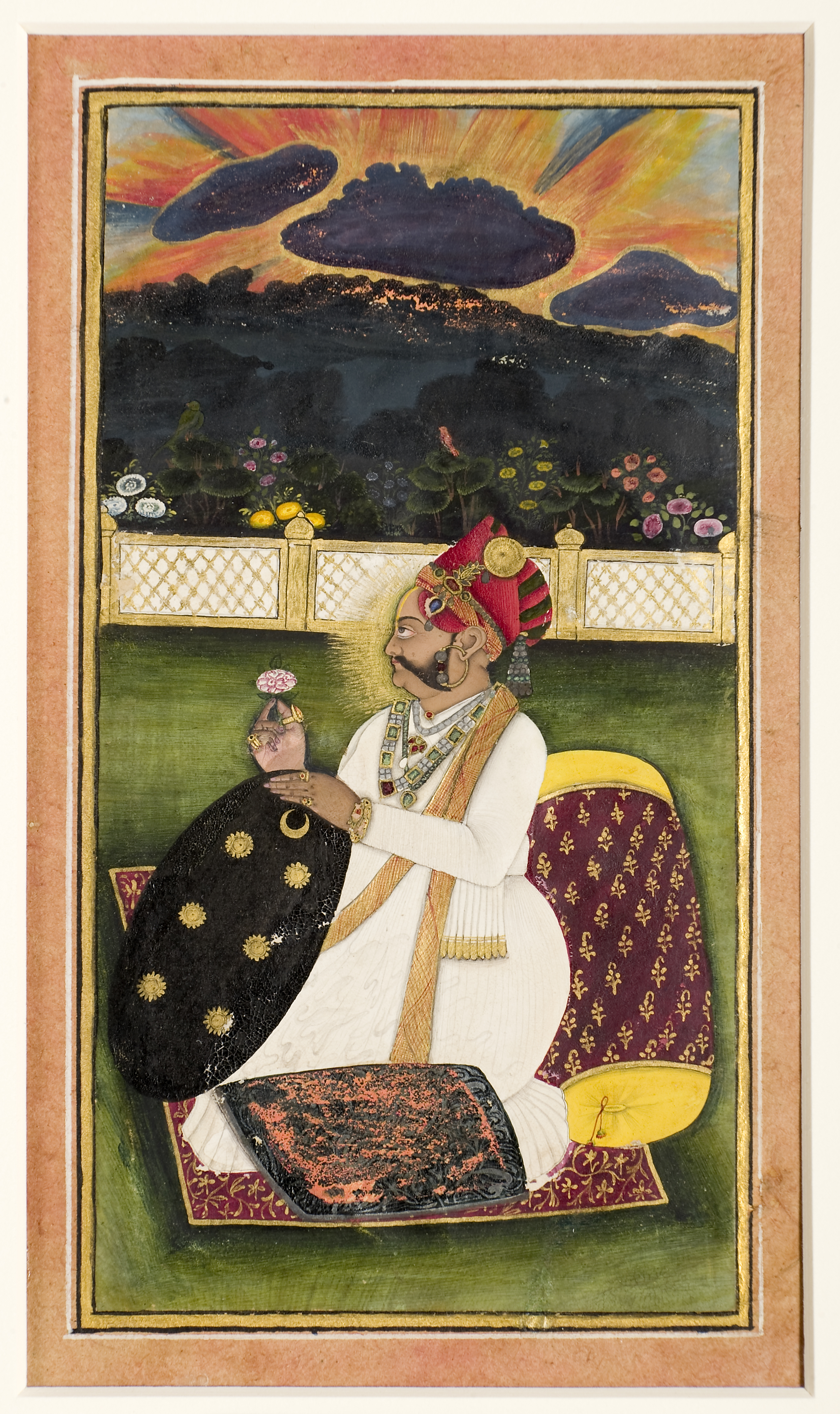

Maharaja of Bikaner
- Reign: 15 May 1745 – 25 March 1787
- Predecessor: Zorawar Singh
- Successor: Maharaja Raj Singh
- Born: 28 March 1723; Fort Reri, Reri, Bikaner
- Died: 25 March 1787 (aged 63–64); Junagarh Fort, Bikaner
- Spouse: Derawariji (Bhatiyaniji) Ajab Kanwarji from Derawar in Jaisalmer; Kumbhawatji (Kachwahiji) Chandra Kanwarji of Mahar in Jaipur; Devadiji (Chauhanji) Akshay Kanwarji of Sirohi; Rawalotji (Bhatiyaniji) Chand Kanwarji of Jaisalmer; Rajawatji (Kachwahiji) Fateh Kanwarji of Kaman in Jaipur; Rajawatji (Kachwahiji) Phool Kanwarji of Jhilai in Jaipur; Parmarji Indra Kanwarji of Jaitsisar in Bikaner; Chundawatji Sisodinji Swarup Kanwarji of Amet in Mewar
- Issue: Maharaja Raj Singh; Surtan Singh; Mokham Singh; Ajab Singh; Chatra Singh; Surat Singh; Shyam Singh; Bhupal Singh; Sabal Singh; Ram Singh; Devi Singh; Kushal Singh; Guman Singh; Jagat Singh; Khuman Singh; Mohan Singh; Udai Singh; Zalim Singh; Jait Kanwarji m.to Raja Manohar Singh of Narwar; Padam Kanwarji m.to Maharao Bishan Singh of Bundi; Suraj Kanwarji (marriage not known); Sireh Kanwarji (marriage not known)
- House: Bikawat-Rathore
- Father: Kunwar Anand Singh of Reri
- Mother: Shekhawatji (Kachwahiji) Vijay Kanwarji d.of Kunwar Sawant Singh of Khandela in Jaipur

Maharaja Gaj Singh (1723 – 25 March 1787) was the Rathore Rajput ruler of its Bikawat sub-clan of the Kingdom of Bikaner ruling from 1745 to 1787. During this period, the Kingdom was a vassal state of the imperial Mughal Empire.

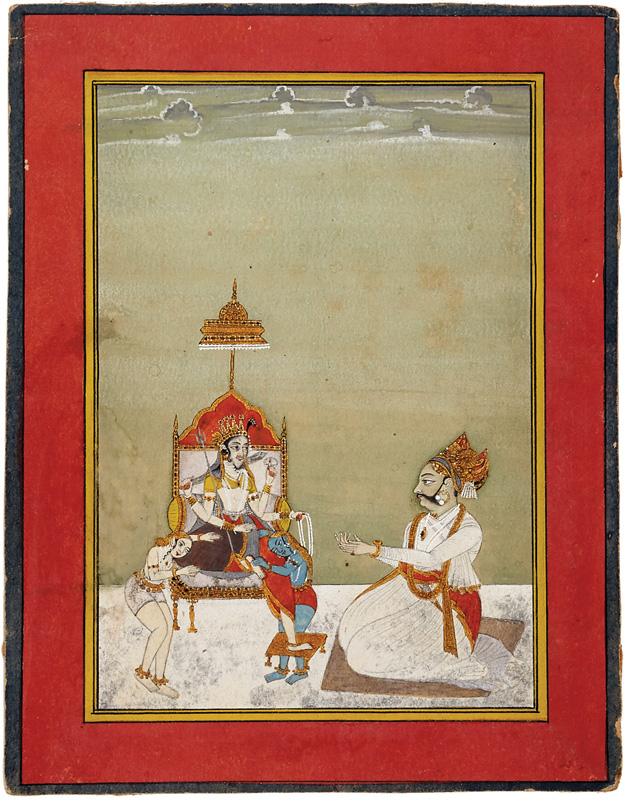
Maharaja Gaj Singhji of Bikaner worshiping goddess Karni Mata

== Biography ==
Gaj Singh was born in 1723. He was the son of Maharaj Anand Singh, and the cousin of his predecessor Maharaja Zorawar Singh. Zorawar had died childless, and the claimants to the throne were Gaj and his brother Maharaj Amar Singh. In 1746, Gaj was enthroned, and Amar defected to Jodhpur. The Maharaja of Jodhpur, Abhai Singh allying himself with Amar Singh, sent a large force which invaded Bikaner and encamped outside the city. The Bikaner army had anticipated the invasion, and had prepared accordingly. However, no decisive battle was fought and the armies remained in a standoff for many months. The Maharaja of Jodhpur proposed a division of Bikaner's territory, and this was rejected by Gaj. Finally, in 1747, the two armies engaged in battle with Gaj leading the troops himself, and the invading army was defeated. Upon hearing this, Maharaja Abhai Singh dispatched a second army against Bikaner, which was defeated at Didwana.

Abhai Singh of Jodhpur died in 1749 and was succeeded by his son Ram Singh. Ram Singh ruled for two years before he was defeated by the combined forces of Bakht Singh and Maharaja Gaj Singh of Bikaner. Bakht was enthroned and subsequently, Gaj returned to Bikaner. He entered Jodhpur again soon after, to assist Bakht against an invading force led by Ram Singh. This force was defeated, and Gaj returned to Bikaner a second time. However, Bakht Singh died in 1752 and Gaj recognized his son Maharaja Vijay Singh as the ruler of Jodhpur, according him support.

Gaj proceeded with his forces to assist Vijay Singh, who was facing the combined forces of Ram Singh and the Marathas. The armies clashed first at Gangarada, and later at Chorasan, and the armies of Gaj and Vijay Singh were defeated. Gaj Singh hosted Vijay Singh at Bikaner, and later the two went to Jaipur in order to solicit aid from the Maharaja Madho Singh. Madho Singh, however, was allied to Ram Singh, and offered 84 villages to Gaj in exchange for allying himself with Ram Singh. This offer was rejected by Gaj.

In 1752, the Mughal emperor Ahmad Shah assigned the pargana of Hisar to Gaj, as Mughal forces were unable to keep it under control. On Gaj Singh's behalf, Mehta Bakhtawar Singh occupied it. Mehta aided the emperor against the vizier Mansur Ali Khan, and for this assistance, Gaj Singh was granted a mansab of 7000 zat and 5000 horse in 1753. Later, Gaj was also granted the right to mint currency by the Mughal emperor Alamgir II.

=== Rebellion of Raj Singh and death ===
Subsequently, the heir apparent Raj Singh along with other Thakurs of the state rose in rebellion. The prince lived at Deshnoke between 1775 and 1780, after which he took shelter at Jodhpur, where he was received by the Maharaja Bijay Singh. Bijay advised the prince to return to Bikaner along with a small contingent. Upon their arrival however, Raj Singh was arrested by his brothers. However, when Gaj fell ill, he summoned Raj Singh and handed over the reins of the state to him, enjoining him not to seek vengeance against his brothers. Gaj Singh died in 1787, and was cremated.

== Issue ==
Gaj Singh had sixty-one children, not all of them were legitimate. Tenty sons and nine daughters were legitimate (multiple sources say six children were legitimate) and they were:

- Maharaja Raj Singh, who succeeded Gaj as Maharaja, r. 25 March 1787 – 25 April 1787, succeeded by his six year old son, Maharaja Pratap Singh who died the same year and was succeeded by one of Raj Singh's younger brother's Maharaja Surat Singh.
- Maharajkumar Sultan Singh, (son via Maharani Devarji Akhey Kanwar) who fled Bikaner in 1787. Returned to Bikaner in 1801 in an attempt to take over the throne but did not succeed. Ancestor of the Gajsingot Haveliwale Rajvi families of Banisar & Alsar. (1759–1815)
- Maharakjumar Mukham Singh, (son via Maharani Bhatianji Chand Kanwar) who fled Bikaner before the death of his father and died of smallpox in Phalodi before 1787. Ancestor of the Gajsingot Haveliwale Rajvi families of Sainsar & Jhamba. (1758–1787)
- Maharaj Ajab Singh, (son via Maharani Bhatianji Chand Kanwar) who fled Bikaner in 1787 to Sindh and later to Jodhpur. Engaged in constant raids on Bikaner with his brother Maharajkumar Sultan Singh and the Thakurs of Churu, Bhadra & Bhukarka. Ancestor of families of the Thikanas Lohat under Jodhpur and Bhapura and Jasunta under Jaipur. (1762–1801)
- Maharajkumar Chattar Singh, (via Maharani Kacchawji Ranawatji Phool Kanwar) whose descendants - Maharaja Dungar Singh & Maharaja Ganga Singh became Maharaja of Bikaner after the lineage of Maharaja Surat Singh came to an end with Maharaja Sardar Singh. Chattar Singh's descendants of Bikaner, Ridi & Tejrasar are the Gajsingot Dyodhiwale Rajvis & the current extended Bikaner Royal Family. (1762–1779)
- Maharaja Surat Singh, (via Maharani Kacchawatji Ranawatji Phool Kanwar) Maharaja of Bikaner r. 9 October 1787 – 25 March 1828. His lineage of Kings came to an end with his grandson Maharaja Sardar Singh who was succeeded by descendants from his elder brother, Maharajkumar Chattar Singh's branch.
- Maharaj Bhopal Singh, (via Maharani Panwarji). Ancestor of the family of Thikana Sumana. (1769–1831)
- Maharajkumar Shyam Singh, (via Maharani Kacchawji Ranawatji Phool Kanwar). Ancestor of the family of Thikana Manaksar.
- Maharaj Sabal Singh, (via Maharani Bhatianji Chand Kanwar)
- Maharajkumar Ram Singh, (via Maharani Bhatianji Chand Kanwar). died 1762.
- Maharaj Devi Singh, (via Maharani Chundawatji Swarup Kanwar). Imprisoned by his brother Maharaja Surat Singh from 1787 to 1790. Escaped with the help of Thakur Bakhtawar Singh Tanwar of Janjeu and spent his days at the courts of Jaipur, Jodhpur, Alwar, Shahpura & Bundi. Ancestor of Gajsingot Haveliwale Rajvi families of Saloondia, Kurjhari, Dharnok and Rojhari. (born 1773)
- Maharakjumar Kushal Singh, (son via Maharani Bhatianji Chand Kanwar)
- Maharaj Kushal Singh, (son via Maharani Chundawatji Swarup Kanwar). Imprisoned by his brother Maharaja Surat Singh from 1787 to 1790 with his elder brother Maharaj Devi Singh. Escaped with the help of Thakur Bakhtawar Singh Tanwar of Janjeu. Ancestor of the families of Thikanas Laalsar, Himmatsar & Neena riyasat. (1774–1853)
- Maharaj Guman Singh
- Maharaj Jagat Singh, (son via Maharani Rajawatji Chandra Kanwar)
- Maharaj Kuman Singh
- Maharaj Mohan Singh
- Maharaj Udai Singh, (son via Maharani Rajawatji Chandra Kanwar)
- Maharaj Jalim Singh, (son via Maharani Bhatianji Chand Kanwar)
- Maharaj Ajit Singh
- Maharajkumari Jait Kanwar Baisa, (daughter via Maharani Rajawatji Chandra Kanwar). Married in 1788 to Raja Manohar Singh Bahadur of Narwar and thus Rani Rathoreji Jait Kanwar of Narawar.
- Maharajkumari Sire Kanwar Baisa, (daughter via Maharani Bhatianji Chand Kanwar)
- Three more daughters (names unknown, via Maharani Devarji Akhey Kanwar).
- Maharajkumari Suraj Kanwar Baisa, (daughter via Maharani Kacchawatji Rajawatji Phool Kanwar)
- Three more daughters (names unknown, via Maharani Panwarji)

He also left children who were via lesser wives and concubines and thus were not eligible to succeed. Some of them who are known were:

- Rao Raj Daulat Ram
- Rao Raj Prithvi Raj
- Rao Raj Dheerat Singh
- Rao Raj Jait Singh
- Rao Raj Chander Bhan
- Rao Raj Sawai Singh
- Rao Raj Tilok Singh
- Rao Raj Udai Singh

== Bibliography ==
- Sehgal, K. K. (1962). Rajasthan District Gazetteers: Bikaner. Jaipur: Bharat Printers.
- Powlett, P. W. (1874). Gazetteer of The Bikaner State.
- Goetz, Hermann (1950). Art and Architecture of Bikaner State. Bruno Cassirer.
