= Anup Singh of Bikaner =

Maharaja of Bikaner from 1669 to 1698

Maharaja Anup Singh
- Maharaja
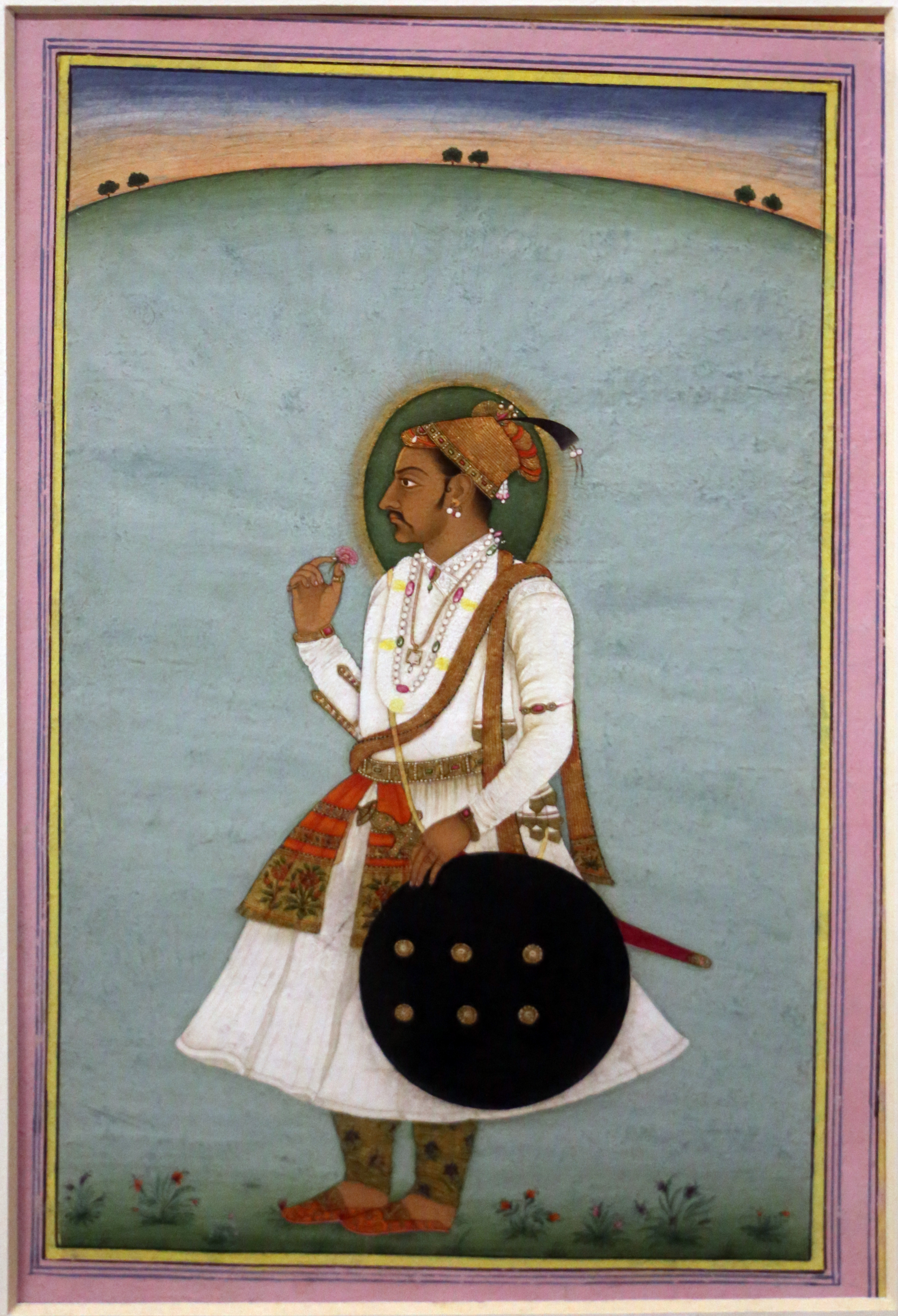
- An 1852 painting of Anup Singh

Maharaja of Bikaner
- Reign: 1669–1698
- Predecessor: Karan Singh
- Successor: Swarup Singh
- Born: 1638; Junagarh Fort, Bikaner, Rajputana
- Died: 1698 (aged 59–60); Adoni, Deccan Subah, Mughal Empire
- Spouse: Bhatiyaniji Ram Kanwarji of Jaisalmer; Sisodiniji Kalyan Kanwarji of Pratapgarh; Ranawatji Deep Kanwarji of Mewar; Kachwahiji (Rajawatji) Chandra Kanwarji of Narwar in Malwa; Kachwahiji (Shekhawatji) Laad Kanwarji of Khandela in Amber; Tanwarji Atirang Kanwarji of Lakhasar in Bikaner; Tanwarji Manohar Kanwarji of Lakhasar in Bikaner; Chauhanji (Songariji) Gunroop Kanwarji of Bae in Bikaner
- Issue: Swarup Singh; Sujan Singh; Anand Singh; Rudra Singh; Roop Singh
- House: Bikawat-Rathore
- Father: Karan Singh
- Mother: Chandrawatji (Sisodiniji) Kishor Kanwarji d.of Kunwar Rukmangad of Rampura in Malwa

Anup Singh (IAST: Anūpa-siṃha; 1638–1698) served as the ruler of Bikaner from 1669 until his death in 1698. Like his father Karan Singh, he was a vassal of the Mughal emperor Aurangzeb, and participated in several Mughal campaigns in the Deccan region. He led the Mughal charge that resulted in the fall of the Golconda Sultanate, for which Aurangzeb conferred the title of Maharaja upon him. Anup Singh was a patron of scholars and painters. He collected several manuscripts and established the Anup Sanskrit Library in his capital city of Bikaner.

== Early life ==
Anup Singh was the eldest son of his predecessor and father Karan Singh, also a Mughal vassal. In July 1667, while Karan Singh was still alive, the Mughal emperor Aurangzeb conferred on Anup Singh the right to rule Bikaner after his father's death. In 1669, Karan Singh died in Aurangabad during the Mughal campaign in the Deccan region, and Anup Singh succeeded him on the throne of Bikaner.

== Military career ==
Anup Singh was an absentee ruler, and spent much of his life at the Mughal court or in Mughal campaigns away from Bikaner. He participated in the Mughal campaign against the Maratha king Shivaji, as a subordinate of the Mughal general Mahabat Khan. As a general of Aurangzeb, Anup Singh led several campaigns in the Deccan region during the 1680s and the 1690s. In 1687, he led the Mughal army to capture the Golconda Sultanate, for which Aurangzeb granted him the title Maharaja. Aurangzeb also granted him the royal honour of Mahi Maratib, and raised his mansabdar rank, first to 3500, and then to 5000.

After the Mughal army captured Bijapur Sultanate in the mid-1680s, Siddi Masud - the Bijapuri governor of Adoni - ruled the Adoni area independently. A Mughal army led by Anup Singh captured Adoni in 1689, and Aurangzeb appointed him the governor of Adoni. Anup Singh held this post until his death in 1698. Bellary was also placed under his charge.

== Rebellions ==
In the 1670s, while Anup Singh was away in Deccan, the Bhatis of Kharbara and Raimalwali rebelled against his administration. They established their base at Churaia (a fort to the north of Bikaner), where the local Johiyas joined them. Mukund Singh, a mahajan (merchant class) official of Anup Singh, suppressed the rebellion. Later, the fort of Churaia was demolished, and in 1678, it was replaced by a larger fort named Anupgarh after Anup Singh.

In 1678, Anup Singh's half-brother Banmali, who was Karan Singh's son by a concubine, claimed half of Bikaner State on the basis of a firman issued by the Mughal emperor. Banmali's wife, who was a slave-girl, apparently poisoned him to death at the instructions of Anup Singh, who made the emperor believe that Banmali had died of natural causes.

== Death and succession ==
Anup Singh died in 1698 at Adoni. Several women from his harem committed sati (suicide by immolation), including 2 queens (ranis), 9 common law wives, and 7 maids.

Anup Singh's eldest son Sarup Singh (r. 1698–1700), who was nine-year old at the time, succeeded him on the throne. He died of chicken pox at Adoni. Anup Singh's younger son Sujan Singh (r. 1700–1735) then became the ruler of Bikaner.

== Cultural activities ==
Anup Singh was a Sanskrit scholar, mathematician and astronomer. He collected a large number of Sanskrit-language manuscripts during his time in the Deccan, and established the Anup Sanskrit Library. He also patronized many Sanskrit writers including Manirama Dikshita, Vidyanatha, and Joshiraya (apparently same as Virasimha Ganaka). The authorship of Josiraya's Anupa-karana is falsely attributed to him (as Anūpasiṃha).

During his years as a Mughal general in Deccan, Anup Singh set up a court there, and employed several painters. His finest artist was Ruknuddin, who had already been in Bikaner's service since the 1660s; several of his relatives also joined the Bikaner service. During this period, the Mughal style influenced the Bikaner style of painting.

Besides the construction of Anupgarh, Anup Singh made several additions to the Junagarh Fort. He added decoration to the Karan Mahal, which was built by his father as the public audience hall (diwan-i-aam). In 1690, he commissioned the Anup Mahal as the private audience hall (diwan-i-khas); the later ruler Surat Singh added much of the structure's interior decor.
