= Ratan Singh of Bikaner =

Maharaja of Bikaner from 1828 to 1851

Maharaja Ratan Singh
- Maharaja
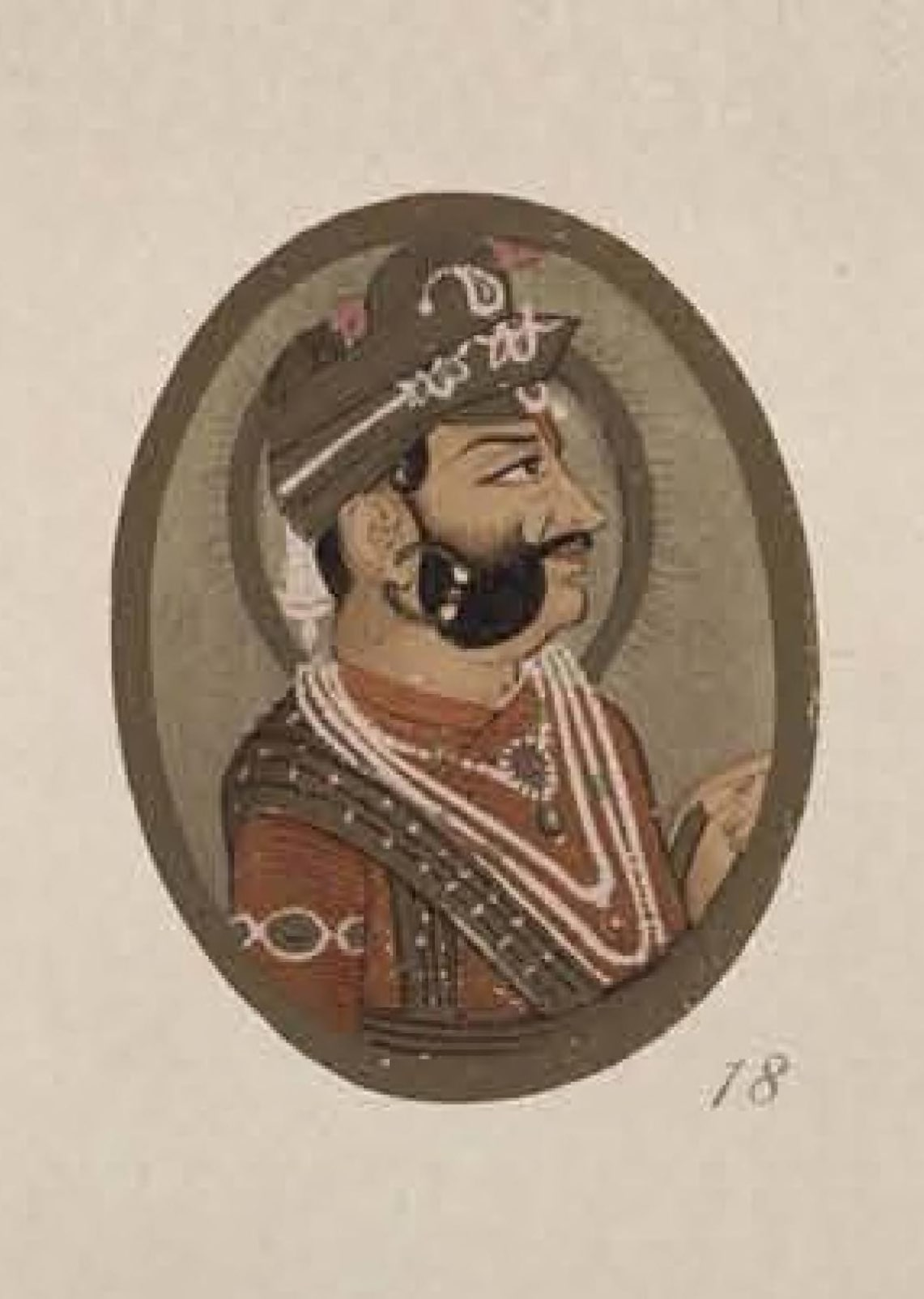

Maharaja of Bikaner
- Reign: 25 March 1828 – 7 August 1851
- Predecessor: Surat Singh
- Successor: Sardar Singh
- Born: 30 December 1790
- Died: 7 August 1851 (aged 60)
- Spouse: Shekhawatji Raj Kanwarji of Dundlod in Jaipur Ranawatji Ajab Kanwarji of Udaipur-Mewar Bhatiyaniji Chand Kanwarji of Gadiyala in Bikaner Bhatiyaniji Udai Kanwarji of Gadiyala in Bikaner Bhatiyaniji Umaid Kanwarji of Barsalpur in Bikaner
- Issue: Sardar Singh Kunwar Sher Singh (died an infant) Baiji Lal Gulab Kanwarji m.to Maharana Sardar Singh of Udaipur-Mewar
- House: Bikaner
- Dynasty: Rathore
- Father: Surat Singh
- Mother: Parmarji Sardar Kanwarji d.of Rao Kesari Singh of Jaitsisar in Bikaner

Maharaja Ratan Singh (30 December 1790 – 7 August 1851) was the Rathore Rajput ruler of Bikaner from 1828 until his death in 1851.

== Birth and early life ==
He was born on 30 December 1790 to Surat Singh and his wife Sardar Kanwar.When the installation ceremony of the temple of Pashupatinath at Haridwar was conducted by Shravan Nath in 1820, he, along with Jawan Singh, the Maharana of Udaipur, bore the expenses of the feast given to Brahmins on the occasion of Kumbh Mela. They also gifted five elephants, five horses, five large shawls, and ten gold bracelets to those who performed the yajna and provided the architect.

== Reign ==
Upon the death of his father, Surat Singh, in 1828, Ratan Singh succeeded him as the Maharaja of Bikaner. Ratan Singh's early reign was marked by frequent uprisings by his barons, including the Raja of Mahajan, and by military campaigns to bring them to obedience. In 1829, he violated his treaty engagements with the British government and invaded Jaisalmer to avenge some depredations committed by its people. He advanced up to Bansanpur. Both parties were ready to fight and asked neighboring states for assistance. It was only through the intervention of the Maharana of Udaipur and the British government that the dispute between them was settled. However, the quarrel between them continued until 1835, when a British officer helped them reach reconciliation. In 1831, Akbar II sent an envoy with a kharita (an important letter, usually sent in an elaborate textile pouch, to or from a ruler or elite), whom Ratan Singh received in a shamiana outside Junagarh Fort. Akbar II conferred on him a robe of honour, Mahi Maratib, and a present of horses, an elephant, and nagaras. Akbar II also conferred upon him the title of Narendra Shiromani. He visited Haridwar in 1831, Rewa and Alwar in 1836, Udaipur in 1839, and Delhi in 1842. Like his father, he put forward a claim over the villages adjoining Bhadra. Captain Thoresby was appointed in 1837 to settle the border dispute between Bikaner and the British government, and the disputed territory was adjudged to the latter. In 1842, he supplied the British government with 200 camels for the Kabul expedition. He assisted the British government in both the Sikh campaigns. In 1844, a year after the British government decided to establish a line of communication between Sirsa and Bahawalpur, they asked Ratan to provide better facilities to traders, reduce transit duties, and construct rest houses and watchtowers along this trade route. He complied with the request and constructed wells along with the other specified facilities. When Jawahar Singh sought his shelter to escape prosecution from the British government, he refused to hand him over despite their insistence. Instead, he informed them that if they were not prepared to spare Jawahar, he was willing to surrender his son, Sardar Singh, in his place. They obliged his request and permitted him to keep Jawahar in a room over Suraj Pol in Junagarh. This won him recognition, and bardic poetry is full of praise for him. He put a stop to the practice of lavish dowries in Bikaner. He went on a pilgrimage to Gaya, where he made his officials and nobles take a solemn vow never to kill their infant daughters. He passed a law stating that any noble found guilty of female infanticide would have his estate confiscated. He banned practices such as sati and supported widow remarriage.

== Arts and architecture ==
He added the Daftar-ki-Kotri, the Ganpat Niwas, and the water pavilion in the Karan Mahal Chowk to Junagarh Fort, as well as the Vikram Niwas, Surat Vilas, and Kothi Lakshmi Vilas to its zenana. He renovated the rest of the Rai Niwas and the Sujan Mahal. He completed the decoration of the anteroom of the Phool Mahal. He had the ceiling of the vestibule of the Chandra Mahal painted. In 1846, he laid the foundation stone of the Raj Ratan Temple, named jointly after his wife, Raj Kanwar, and himself. Upon its completion, he performed the prana pratishtha ceremony on 4 March 1851.

== Personal life ==
Like his father, he wore full whiskers. Bithu Bhauma authored the book Ratan Vilas, and Sagardan composed Ratanrupak in his honor.

=== Marriages ===
He married, among others, Raj Kanwar, a daughter of Ranjit Singh, the Thakur of Dundlod, and Ajab Kumari, a daughter of Bhim Singh, the Maharana of Udaipur.

== Death ==
He died in 1851 and was succeeded by his son, Sardar Singh, who assumed his title, rank, and dignity.
