= Surat Singh of Bikaner =

Maharaja of Bikaner from 1787 to 1828

Maharaja Surat Singh
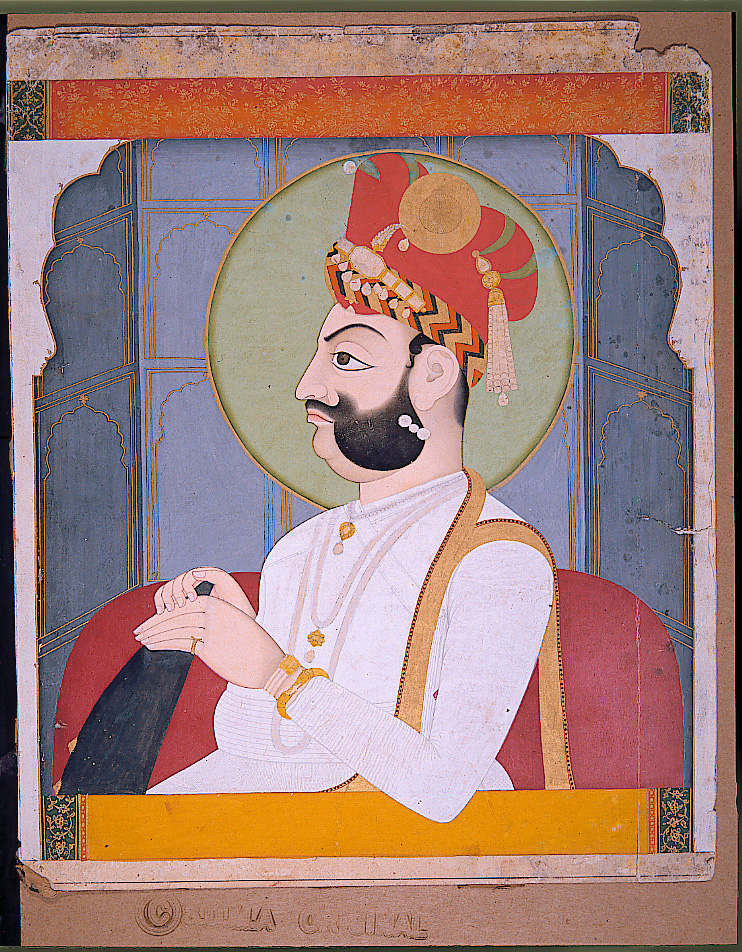

Maharaja of Bikaner
- Reign: 25 April 1787 – 25 March 1828
- Predecessor: Pratap Singh
- Successor: Ratan Singh
- Born: 18 December 1765; Junagarh Fort, Bikaner
- Died: 25 March 1828 (aged 62); Junagarh Fort, Bikaner
- Spouse: Panwarji Sardar Kanwarji of Jaitsisar in Bikaner; Bhatiyaniji (Barsalpuriji) Shyam Kanwarji of Barsalpur in Bikaner; Bhatiyaniji Abhai Kanwarji of Sindhu in Jaisalmer; Kachwahiji (Rajawatji) Shringar Kanwarji of Baleri in Bikaner
- House: Bikawat-Rathore
- Father: Gaj Singh
- Mother: Kachwahiji (Rajawatji) Phool Kanwarji grand-daughter of Raja Kushal Singh of Jhalai in Jaipur

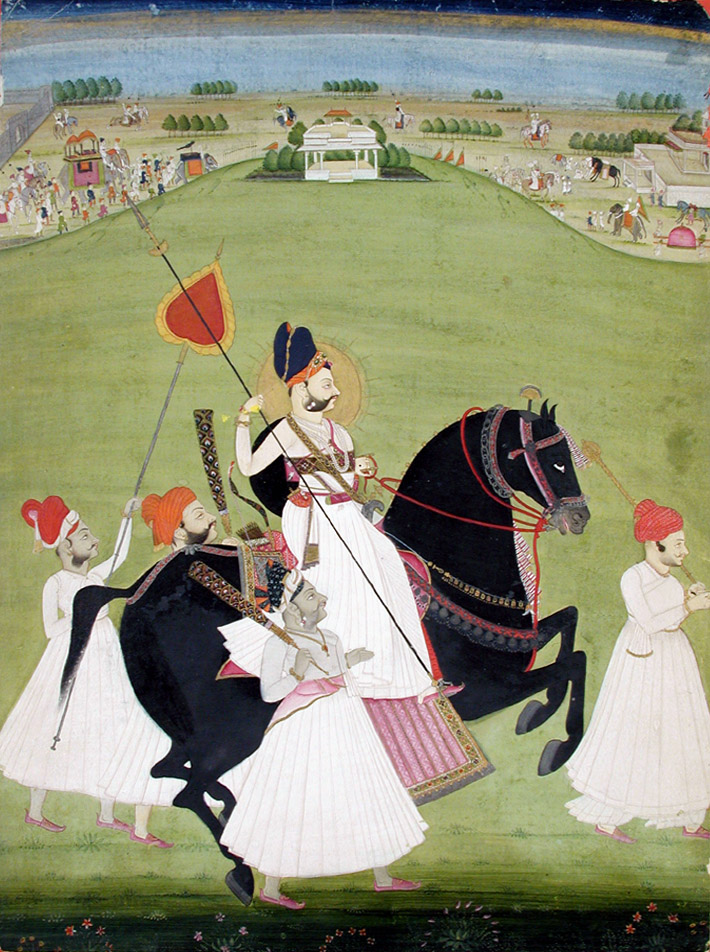
Raja Surat Singh on horseback with retainers (6124565415)

Maharaja Surat Singh (18 December 1765 – 25 March 1828) was the ruler of the Kingdom of Bikaner between 1787 and 1828. It was during his reign that the Kingdom of Bikaner became a Princely State of the imperial British Empire.

== Biography ==
Surat Singh was born in 1765. His father was Gaj Singh, who ruled as Maharaja between 1746 and 1787. Upon Gaj Singh's death, his eldest surviving son Raj Singh ascended the throne, only to die a few days later. Raj Singh's son Pratap Singh, a boy of six, was crowned, with Surat Singh being appointed as the regent.

=== Regency ===
Pratap Singh survived his father for a short while, but died soon after. The Khiyat ascribes his death to smallpox, but it is agreed upon by historians that he was, in all probability, murdered by Surat Singh.

=== Reign ===
Faced with a Thakur rebellion, Surat Singh decided to seek British assistance. He sent an emissary to Delhi in order to negotiate a treaty with Charles Metcalfe. On 9 March 1818, the treaty was signed, which stated that the rulers of Bikaner were bound to act in “subordinate co-operation” to the British, in exchange for protection and British assistance in quelling any rebellions.

=== Death ===
Surat Singh died in 1828, and was cremated, with his final rites being performed by his son Ratan Singh. Ratan Singh succeeded him as Maharaja.

== Bibliography ==
- Sehgal, K. K. (1962). Rajasthan District Gazetteers: Bikaner. Jaipur: Bharat Printers.
- Powlett, P. W. (1874). Gazetteer of The Bikaner State.
