= Sardar Singh of Bikaner =

Maharaja of Bikaner from 1851 to 1872

Maharaja Sardar Singh
- Maharaja
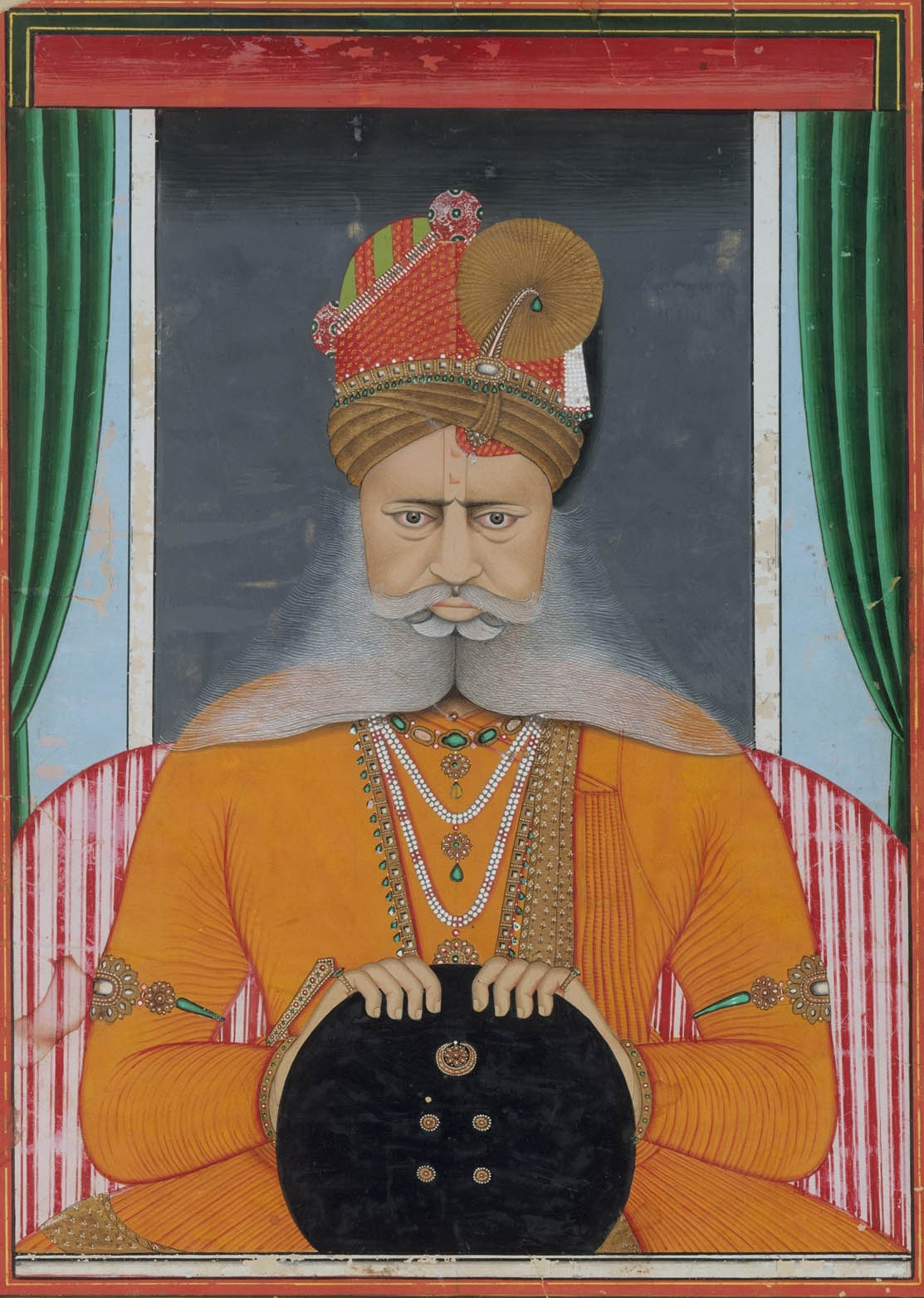
- Portrait c. 1860–1870

Maharaja of Bikaner
- Reign: 7 August 1851 – 16 May 1872
- Coronation: 19 August 1851
- Predecessor: Ratan Singh
- Successor: Dungar Singh
- Born: 18 September 1818
- Died: 16 May 1872 (aged 53)
- Spouse: Sisodiniji Pratap Kanwarji of Pratapgarh State; Sisodiniji Ranawatji Mehtab Kanwarji of Udaipur-Mewar; Kachwahiji (Narukiji) Bhoor Kanwarji of Alwar State; Bagheliji Padam Kanwarji of Rewa State; Bhatiyaniji (Rawalotji) Hukam Kanwarji of Jaisalmer State; Bhatiyaniji Govind Kanwarji of Jakhan in Marwar; Bhatiyaniji (Pugalyaniji) Chand Kanwarji of Pugal in Bikaner State; Bhatiyaniji (Pugalyaniji) Kishan Kanwarji of Pugal in Bikaner State; Bhatiyaniji (Pugalyaniji) Takht Kanwarji of Pugal in Bikaner State; Bhatiyaniji (Rawalotji) Man Kanwarji of Gadiyala in Bikaner State; Bhatiyaniji (Rawalotji) Heer Kanwarji of Gadiyala in Bikaner State; Kachwahiji (Kumbhawatji) Kundan Kanwarji of Baleri in Bikaner State; Kachwahiji (Kumbhawatji) Suraj Kanwarji of Baleri in Bikaner State; Tanwarji Dev Kanwarji of Kelawa in Marwar; Tanwarji Yadav Kanwarji of Lakhasar in Bikaner State
- House: Bikaner
- Dynasty: Rathore
- Father: Maharaja Ratan Singh
- Mother: Maharaniji Shekhawatji Raj Kanwarji d.of Rawal Ranjit Singh of Dundlod in Jaipur State

Maharaja Sardar Singh was the Rathore-Rajput ruler of its Bikawat subclan of Bikaner State from the year 1851 until his death in 1872.

== Birth ==
Singh was born on 13 September 1818 as the eldest son of Ratan Singh and his wife, Raj Kanwar, from Shekhawati.

== Succession ==
Upon the death of his father on 7 August 1851, he succeeded him as the Maharaja of Bikaner.

== Coronation ==
His coronation was held on 19 August 1851. The coronation ceremony of Sardar Singh followed a pattern similar to the coronations of the Maharajas of Bikaner before him. His day began with the application of ointment in sacred oil and a purificatory bath in saffron water. He then worshipped Ganesh, followed by prayers to various gods, goddesses, and family deities at Har Mandir in Junagarh. When the preparations were completed in the Karan Mahal, the nobat (transl. beating of kettle drums with clarinet) was played in the chaubara (transl. open room with four doors) just opposite the Karan Mahal. Then, he was brought to Karan Mahal, where the sandalwood throne of the Emperors of Kannauj was placed. He was wearing a saffron colored court dress. He moved toward the throne and offered a mujra (transl. obeisance or formal salutation), by joining both hands, bending slightly, and bowing three times from a distance. As recorded in Desh Darpan (transl. Mirror of the Country), a historical account of Bikaner’s rulers, he bowed and paid homage 21 times in between. Afterward, he bowed near the throne and concluded the mujra by performing it three times in the full durbar. Chiefs of Mahajan and Bhukarka were standing on the left of the throne, while the Chiefs of Bidasar and Rawatsar were standing on the right. All four had the hereditary privilege to mark the Raj Tilak (transl. coronation ceremony). He initially inquired of the chiefs on the left of the throne whether he should proceed to ascend. They responded that, by the blessings and will of Lakshminathji and Mataji (Karni Mata), he should do so. He then posed the same question to the chiefs on the right, and they gave the same reply. Following this, he ascended the throne. Afterward, the Chowdhury of Runiya came forward and applied a tilak on Sardar Singh’s forehead. An uncle of his applied tilak on his forehead before the four premier chiefs of Bikaner—Mahajan, Bidasar, Rawatsar, and Bhukarka—who, as per tradition, were to place tilak turn by turn, one after the other, while all other nobles and ministers attending the durbar remained standing. A 101-gun salute was fired to commemorate his coronation. Afterward, a 19-gun salute was fired to signify that he was the 19th ruler of Bikaner. Then, a descendant of Bela Parihar (master of the horse of Rao Bika), who was in the care of the state horses, marked the tilak, and state heirlooms were worshipped. After all the ceremonies were completed, the members of the royal family, chiefs and nobles, ministers, officers, and dignitaries who had assembled presented their nazars (transl. offerings, gifts or tributes) to him. Afterwards, he was presented with paintings of Krishna and of all his predecessors. To accept them, he rose from his seat and received them. Then, he went to Har Mandir again, where arti was performed as usual. He also went to Devi-Dwara and presented offerings to Nagnechiya Maa. Following this, he walked to the Khas-Deodhi of Junagarh and conducted the worship of the Ganesh image fixed over that gate. Once all the rituals associated with the coronation were concluded, he participated in a feast alongside the chiefs and nobles, during which sweetened wheat porridge, mung beans, and rice cooked with ghee were served. He informed James Broun-Ramsay, then Governor-General of India, by sending a kharita of his coronation on 19 August 1851. It was submitted on his behalf by the then Agent to the Governor-General for Rajputana through Henry Miers Elliot.

His coronation was attended by Karni Singh, the Rao of Pugal, who was the first in his family to attend the coronation of any Maharaja of Bikaner. He did so on the condition that Sardar Singh marry his daughter.

== Reign ==
He had, in 1851, requested on behalf of the Thakur of Dundlod, who was related to him, that Ram Singh II issue the necessary orders for the restoration of his villages back to Dundlod, which were usurped by Shyam Singh of Bissau. Accordingly, Ram Singh II assigned the Raja of Khandela to settle the dispute. He had appointed 18 diwans (transl. Prime Minister) from the start of his reign up to 1869.

When the Indian Rebellion of 1857 broke out, he didn't forget the treaty that was signed by his ancestor, Surat Singh, on behalf of Bikaner and Francis Rawdon-Hastings on behalf of the British Government. According to this treaty, signed on 9 March 1818 at Delhi, the friends and enemies of one party were the friends and enemies of both. He provided shelter to European fugitives. Sirsa, Hissar, and Hansi, the British territories that shared borders with Bikaner, were in the hands of rebel forces. He proceeded in person to these places along with his troops to assist British forces.

The forces at his disposal consisted of regular, well-disciplined infantry and cavalry, and a large auxiliary camel force. He was accompanied by his leading nobles and the levies they raised to support Sardar. He had his troops repulse 3,000 rebels near Hazaripur. They captured 7,000 animals and 92 rebels. Six hundred followers of Tatya Tope surrendered to him. When, in November 1858, Queen Victoria, by a proclamation, announced amnesty to all rebels not involved in the murder of British officers and civilians, Sardar persuaded many rebels to surrender. G. St. P. Lawrence, in his official dispatch to the Government of India, described his services as follows:

Sardar Singh, Maharaja of Bikaner, has from the commencement of the outbreak actively exhibited the most loyal friendship and devotion to the British Government, and warmly co-operated with us in the field. The Government of India is already well acquainted with the Raja’s services in rescuing, affording refuge to, and supplying the wants of, several europeans. The troops of this province were employed under General van Cortlandt in Hansee and Hissar.

The excellent conduct of the Maharaja, who at the head of his troops proceeded to his own frontier, there prepared to join us where and whenever required, presented a most notable example, not only to his own dependants, but to the princes of Rajputana, and displayed a spirit and energy not elsewhere met with.

I consider the Maharaja is deserving of the highest scale of reward which the Government may be pleased to sanction to the most meritorious of Rajput states.

— G. St. P. Lawrence

On 21 December 1860, the then Agent to the Governor-General in Rajputana wrote a letter to the Secretary to the Government of India, Foreign Department, which mentioned the services of Sardar Singh in the following words:

His Highness, who at the commencement of the outbreak at once proceeded to his extreme border to assist us, and by his courage and the example of his loyalty checked disaffection and gave confidence to the wavering. No Prince in Rajputana save Bikaner took the field in person in our favour without hesitation. No Prince gave the like aid in searching out and rescuing fugitives, though all gave their hospitable shelter and support, and no other Prince exhibited such purely disinterested motives in giving us his active assistance; and none but the Bikaner Raja suffered so heavy a loss of Rajput kindred and chiefs whilst fighting purely in our cause. It was for these reasons that i considered, and still consider, the loyalty and good services of the Bikaner Raja superior to those of any other chief in Rajputana, including Jaipur.

Queen Victoria, upon learning of his services, sent a kharita through Charles Wood, the Secretary of State for India, which was presented to him in a durbar. It mentioned:

It is in such times that the true quality of friendship is best tested; and it will ever be among the most cherished recollections of Her Majesty that Your Highness and other princely representatives of the ancient houses of Rajpootana were, during the eventful years which have just passed, among the most steadfast of her friends.

Before his reign, Bikaner's copper coins were poorly made and varied in weight. He improved their stamping and quality. No smaller silver coins were issued before him, but he and his successor, Dungar Singh, issued coins of half, quarter, and eighth of a rupee. His coinage bore the name of the Mughal emperor until 1859, when he replaced with the name of Victoria. The new coinage bore the inscription: Aurang árái Hind wa Inglistán Queen Victoria (transl. Queen Victoria, the ornament of the thrones of India and England).

During the first part of his reign, Bikaner was very well administered, but for much of his reign, Bikaner reached the lowest point of its fortunes. His feudatories were always in constant revolt against him, and his armies were unable to reduce them to obedience and manage his dominions. Bikaner fell into heavy debt, and its yearly spending was much higher than its income.

== Architecture ==
He had, before his succession, built a fort at Sardarshahar, a name he gave to the settlement that grew around it. In 1808, the armies of Jodhpur laid waste to Gajner, which was the family hunting seat. Gajner remained a ruin until his reign. He built the Sardar Niwas Palace at Gajner. He added the Ratan Niwas, the Moti Mahal, and the top storeys of the zenana to the Junagarh Fort. He enlarged the hall of Gaj Mandir in Junagarh by double and redecorated it. He renovated the Kanwar-pade-ka-Mahal (transl. the palace of eldest prince) located within it. He also built Ratan Parol, the topkhana (transl. artillery establishment), and some small quarters in the southern extension of Junagarh.

== Personality and public image ==
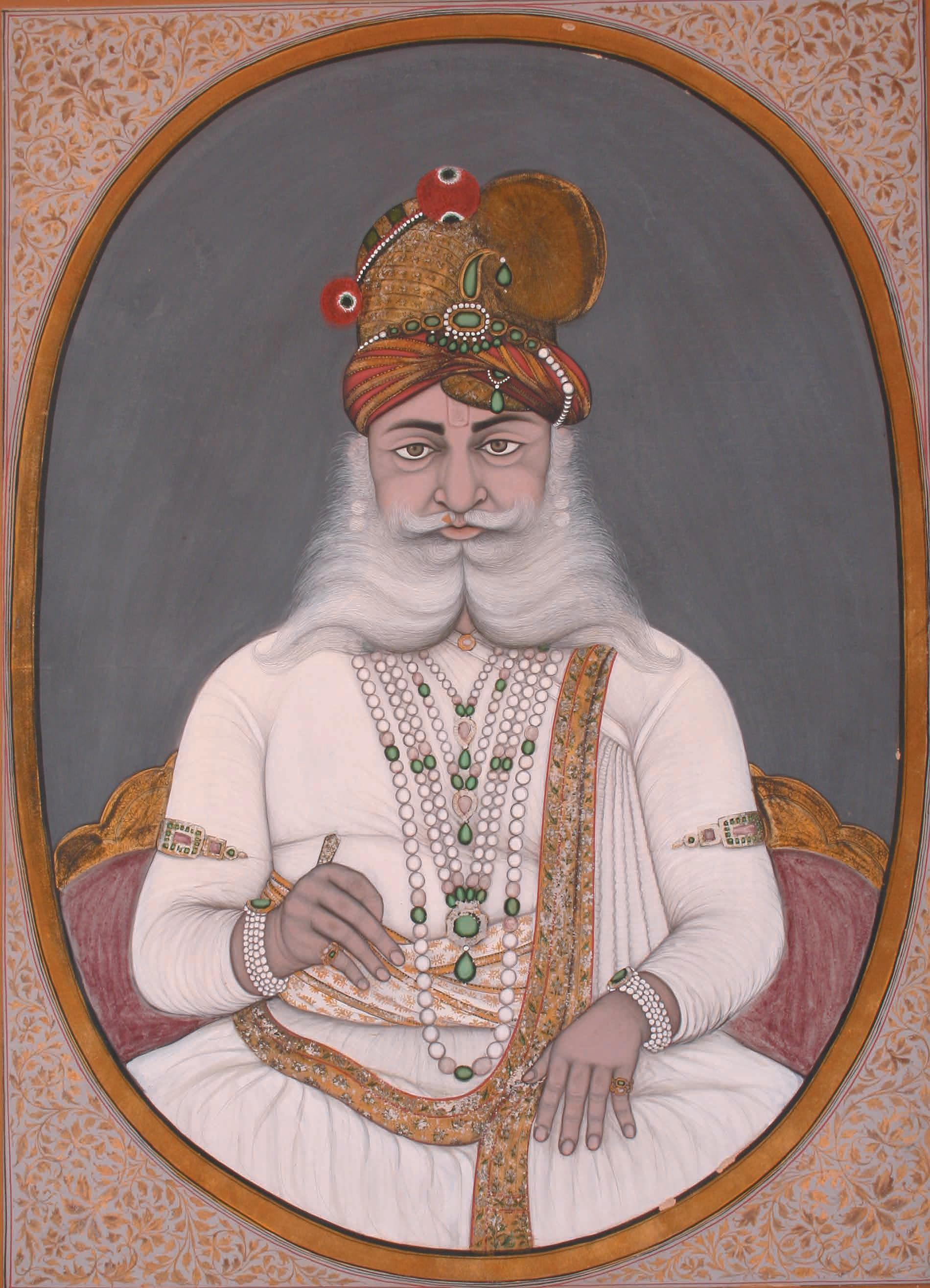
Sardar Singh by Rahim

He was a man of towering personality. He was said to be a real prince in accordance with the Indian traditions. He had a face with a white complexion and a white beard. He was known for his handsomeness. It is said that when Ram Singh II learned of this, he came to Bikaner incognito just to see him.

He had cultivated for him the image of a ruler who was known for his pomp and display. His feelkhana (transl. stable of the elephants) had ninety-nine elephants. In spite of having very dwindling state finances and a large debt, he kept a very large military establishment.

== Death ==
He died on 16 May 1872 at Gajner. He left behind no legitimate issue, nor any declaration regarding the adoption of a successor to him, but a morganatic son who, per traditions, could not succeed him. In such cases of intestacy, per Rajput traditions, an heir is adopted from the collateral branches nearest to the deceased, and this is what was followed. He had, in his lifetime, brought up Dungar Singh and Jaswant Singh as members of his family. Both of them were descendants of Maharaja Gaj Singh's second son, Maharajkumar Chhatar Singh. Dungar Singh was the son of Maharaj Lal Singh and Jaswant Singh was the son of Maharaj Mukan Singh. Both Maharaj Lal Singh and Maharaj Mukan Singh were great grandsons of Maharajkumar Chhatar Singh and thereby his nearest of kin and cousin. Lal was being considered the heir presumptive. However, in accordance with traditions and customs, the choice of successor remained with his eldest wife, Bhatianjiji, and she chose his son Dungar Singh. His youngest wife, Pugalianiji, favoured the adoption of Jaswant Singh. This led to the formation of two groups: one in favour of Dungar Singh's succession, and the other in favour of Jaswant Singh. When Burton, who was at the time dispensing his duties as the Assistant to the Agent to the Governor-General in Rajputana, got to know of what was happening in Bikaner, he came here on 22 May 1872 to look into the matter and ultimately decided in favour of Bhatianjiji. Accordingly, Dungar Singh was adopted as son and successor to Sardar Singh and Jaswant Singh's family retained status of brother of the Maharaja or Maharaj.

== Titles and styles ==
- His Highness Sri Raj Rajeshwar Maharajadhiraj Narendra Maharaja Shiromani Sardar Singh Bahadur, Maharaja of Bikaner
