= Junagarh Fort =

Fort in Bikaner, Rajasthan, India

- Bikaner, Rajasthan, India
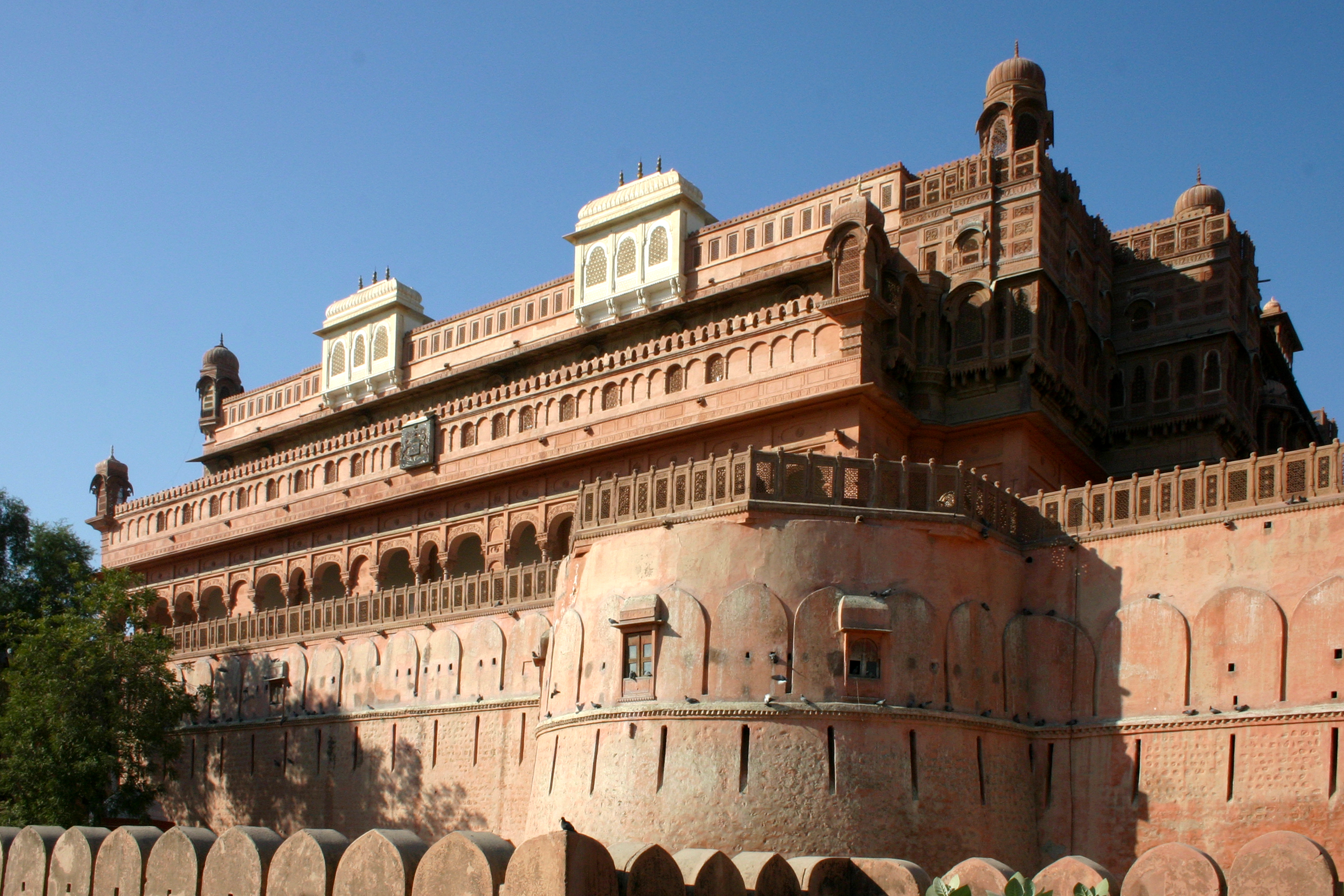
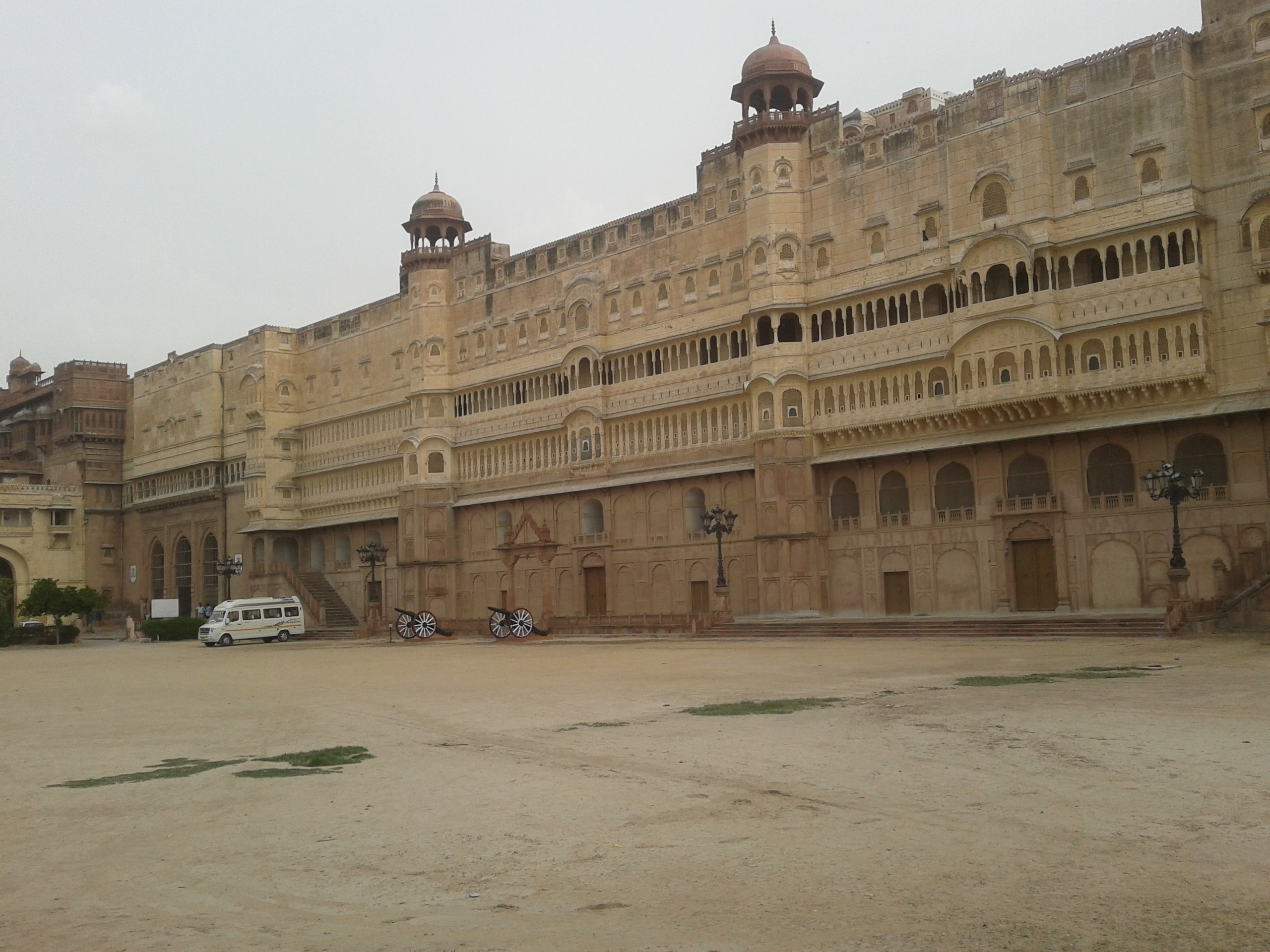
- Top: Exterior view of Junagarh Fort; Bottom: Interior view of Junagarh Fort

Site information
- Type: Fort
- Controlled by: Government of Rajasthan
- Open to the public: Yes
- Condition: Well-preserved, maintained as a museum

Location
- Location within Rajasthan Location within India
- Coordinates: 28.02°N 73.32°E

Site history
- Built: 1589–1594
- Built by: Karan Chand under Rai Singh of Bikaner
- Materials: Red sandstones (Dulmera) and marbles (including Carrara)

Junagarh Fort is a fort in the city of Bikaner, Rajasthan, India. The fort was originally called Chintamani and was renamed Junagarh or "Old Fort" in the early 20th century when the ruling family moved to Lalgarh Palace outside the fort limits. Members of the cadet branch of the royal family continued to reside in the fort. It is one of the few major forts in Rajasthan which is not built on a hilltop. The modern city of Bikaner has developed around the fort.

The fort complex was built under the supervision of Karan Chand, the Prime Minister of Raja Rai Singh, the sixth ruler of Bikaner, who ruled from 1571 to 1611 AD. Construction of the walls and the associated moat commenced in 1589 and was completed in 1594. It was built outside the original fort of the city (the first fort built by Rao Bikaji), about 1.5 kilometres (0.93 mi) from the city centre. Some remnants of the old fort are preserved near the Lakshmi Narayan temple.

Historical records reveal that despite the repeated attacks by enemies to capture the fort, it was not taken, except for a lone one-day occupation by Kamran Mirza. Kamran was the second son of the Mughal Emperor Babur who attacked Bikaner in 1534, which was then ruled by Rao Jait Singh.

The 5.28-hectare fort precinct is studded with palaces, temples and pavilions. These buildings depict a composite culture, manifest in the mix of architectural styles.

== Geography ==
Junagarh Fort is located in the arid region of the Thar Desert of Rajasthan bordered on the northwest by the Aravalli Range, a range of mountains in western India. Part of the desert area is in Bikaner city, which is one of the three desert triangle cities; the other two cities are Jaisalmer and Jodhpur. The name of the place where Bikaner city with its forts was established was then known as Jungladesh.

== History ==
Before the present Junagarh Fort was built, an old stone fort existed in the city. This fort was built in 1478 by Rao Bika who established the city of Bikaner in 1472. Rao Bika was the second son of Rao Jodha of the Rathod clan, the founder of Jodhpur city. He conquered the large arid lands to the northern region of Rajasthan to set up his domain. Even though being the second but eldest surviving son of Rao Jodha, he chose not to inherit his father's kingdom and therefore decided to build his own kingdom at Bikaner at the place then called "Jungladesh". Bikaner, though a partly of the Thar Desert, was considered an oasis on the trade route between Central Asia and the Gujarat coast since it had adequate spring water sources. Bika's name was thus tagged to the Bikaner city as well as to the then state of Bikaner ("the settlement of Bika") that he established. The history of Bikaner and the fort within it thus start with Bika. It was only about 100 years later that Bikaner's fortunes flourished under Raja Rai Singhji, the sixth ruler of Bikaner, who ruled from 1571 to 1611. During the Mughal Empire’s rule in the country, he accepted the suzerainty of the Mughals and held a high position of an army general in the court of Emperor Akbar and his son Emperor Jahangir. His successful war exploits by way of winning half of Mewar kingdom won him accolades and rewards from the Mughal emperors. He was gifted the jagirs (lands) of Gujarat and Burhanpur. With the large revenue earned from these jagirs, he built the Junagarh fort on a plain land, which has an average elevation of 760 feet (230 m). The formal foundation ceremony for the fort was held on 17 February 1589 and the fort was completed on 17 January 1594. Raja Rai Singhji, was an expert in arts and architecture and the knowledge that he acquired during his several sojourns to several countries are amply reflected in the numerous monuments he built in the Junagarh fort. Thus the fort, a composite structure, became an outstanding example of architecture and a unique centre of art, amidst the Thar Desert.

Raja Karan Singh son of Raja Sur Singh who ruled from 1631 to 1639, under the suzerainty of the Mughals, built the Karan Mahal palace. Later rulers added more floors and decorations to this Mahal. Maharaja Anup Singh son of Raja Karan Singh who ruled from 1669 to 1698, made substantial additions to the fort complex, with new palaces and the Zenana quarter (royal dwelling for females). He refurbished the Karan Mahal with a Diwan-i-Am (public audience hall) and called it the Anup Mahal. Maharaja Gaj Singh son of Maharaj Anad Singh who ruled from 1746 to 1787 refurbished the Chandra Mahal (the Moon palace). Following him, Maharaja Surat Singh son of Maharaja Gaj Singh ruled from 1787 to 1828 and he lavishly decorated the audience hall (see picture in info box) with glass and lively paintwork. Maharaja Dungar Singh son of Maharaj Lal Singh who reigned from 1872 to 1887 built the Badal Mahal (the weather palace) named so in view of a painting of falling rain and clouds (a rare event in arid Bikaner). General Maharaja Ganga Singh son of Maharaj Lal Singh who ruled from 1887 to 1943 built the Ganga Niwas Palace, which has towers at the entrance patio. This palace was designed by Sir Samuel Swinton Jacob. Ganga Singh's son Sadul Singh succeeded his father in 1943 but acceded to the Union of India in 1949. He died in 1950.

Bikaner came under the suzerainty of the British Raj under a treaty of paramountcy signed in 1818, whereafter the Maharajas of Bikaner invested heavily on refurbishing their Junagarh fort. However, during the 18th century, before this treaty was signed, there was internecine war between rulers of Bikaner and Jodhpur and also amongst other Thakur, which was put down by the British troops. It is reported that during the attack by Jodhpur army, of the two entrances to the fort (one in the east and the other in the west), the eastern entrance and the southern rampart were damaged; marks of cannonballs fired are seen on the southern façade of the fort.

Ganga Singh was the best-known king among the Rajasthan princes. A favourite of the British Raj, he earned the title of Knight Commander of the Star of India. He served as a member of the Imperial War Cabinet, represented the country at the Imperial First World War Conferences and the British Empire at the Versailles Peace Conference and was aware of the shift of fortunes in the World War II but died in 1943, before the war was won by the allies. His contribution to the building activity in Junagarh involved separate halls for public and private audience in the Ganga Mahal and a durbar hall for formal functions. The hall where he held his Golden Jubilee as a ruler of Bikaner is now a museum. He also got a new palace – north of Junagarh fort – designed and built by Swinton, the third of the new palaces built in Bikaner and named it Lalgarh Palace in the name of his father Maharaj Lal Singh Ji of Bikaner (Chattargarh) and shifted his residence from Junagarh fort to this palace in 1902, whilst his closest cousins: The Dyodhiwale Rajvis of Bikaner State who were the cadet branch of the Royal Family and Maharaja Ganga Singh Ji's closest cousins continued to reside in the fort, particularly in the Dalel Niwas named after Maharaja Ganga Singh Ji and his cousins' Great Grandfather Maharaj Dalel Singh Ji son of Maharajkumar Chattar Singh Ji and grandson of Maharaja Gaj Singh Ji. The ruling family still lives in a special suite in the Lalgarh palace, which they have converted into a heritage hotel.

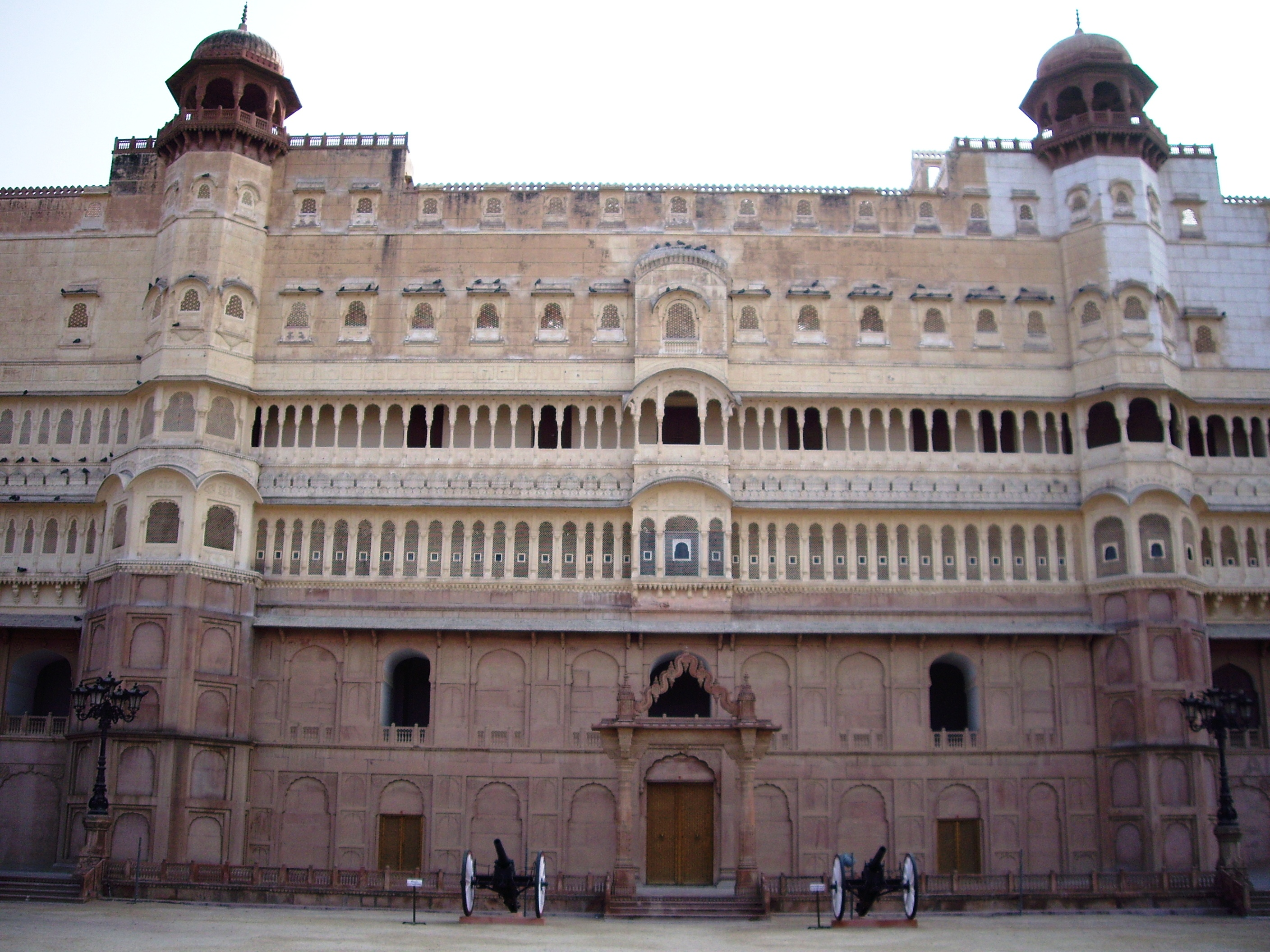
Entrance eastern façade of the Junagarh Fort.

== Structures ==
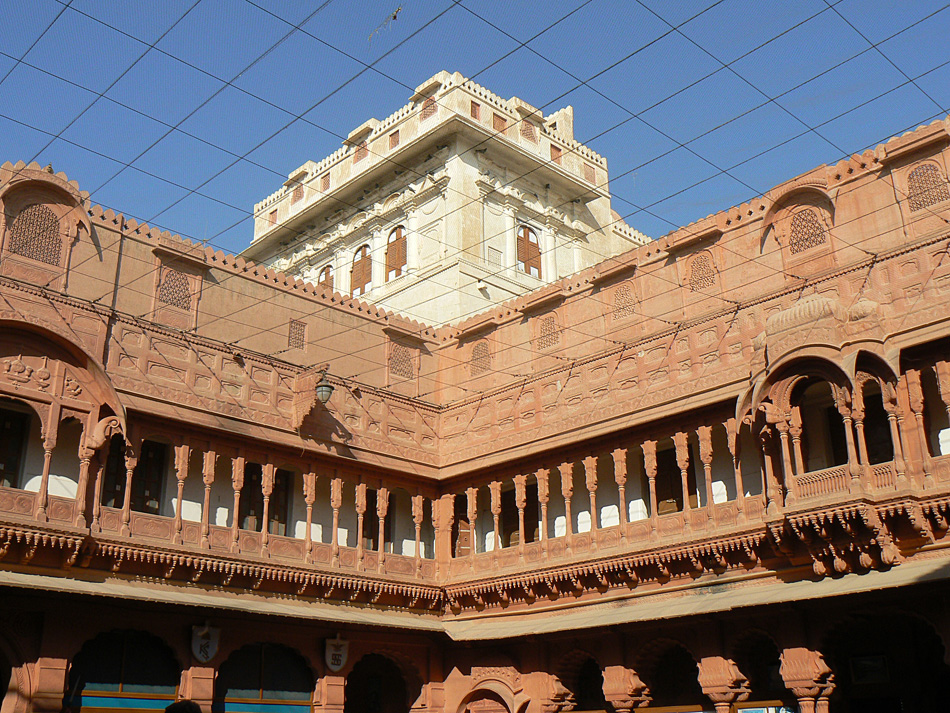
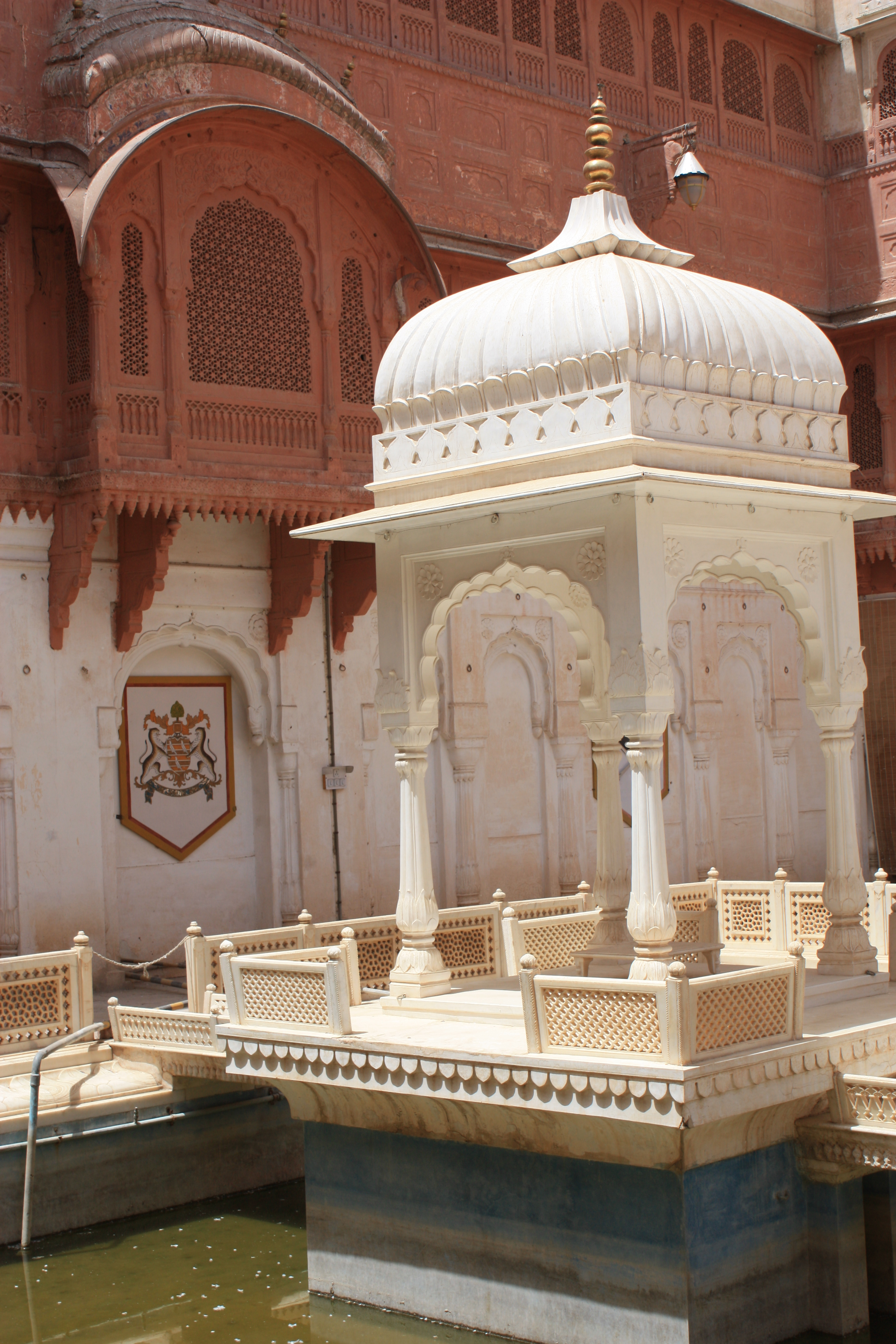
Left: Views of palaces from the main courtyard built in Italian Carrara marble, Right: Karan Mahal and pond in the main courtyard, in Mughal style of architecture

The structures built within the Junagarh fort are the palaces and temples, which are made of red sandstone (Dulmera) and marble. The palaces are described as picturesque with their assortment of courtyards, balconies, kiosks and windows. The fort, the temples and the palaces are preserved as museums and provide insight into the grandiose living style of the past Maharanas of Rajasthan. The fort is called "a paradox between medieval military architecture and beautiful interior decoration".

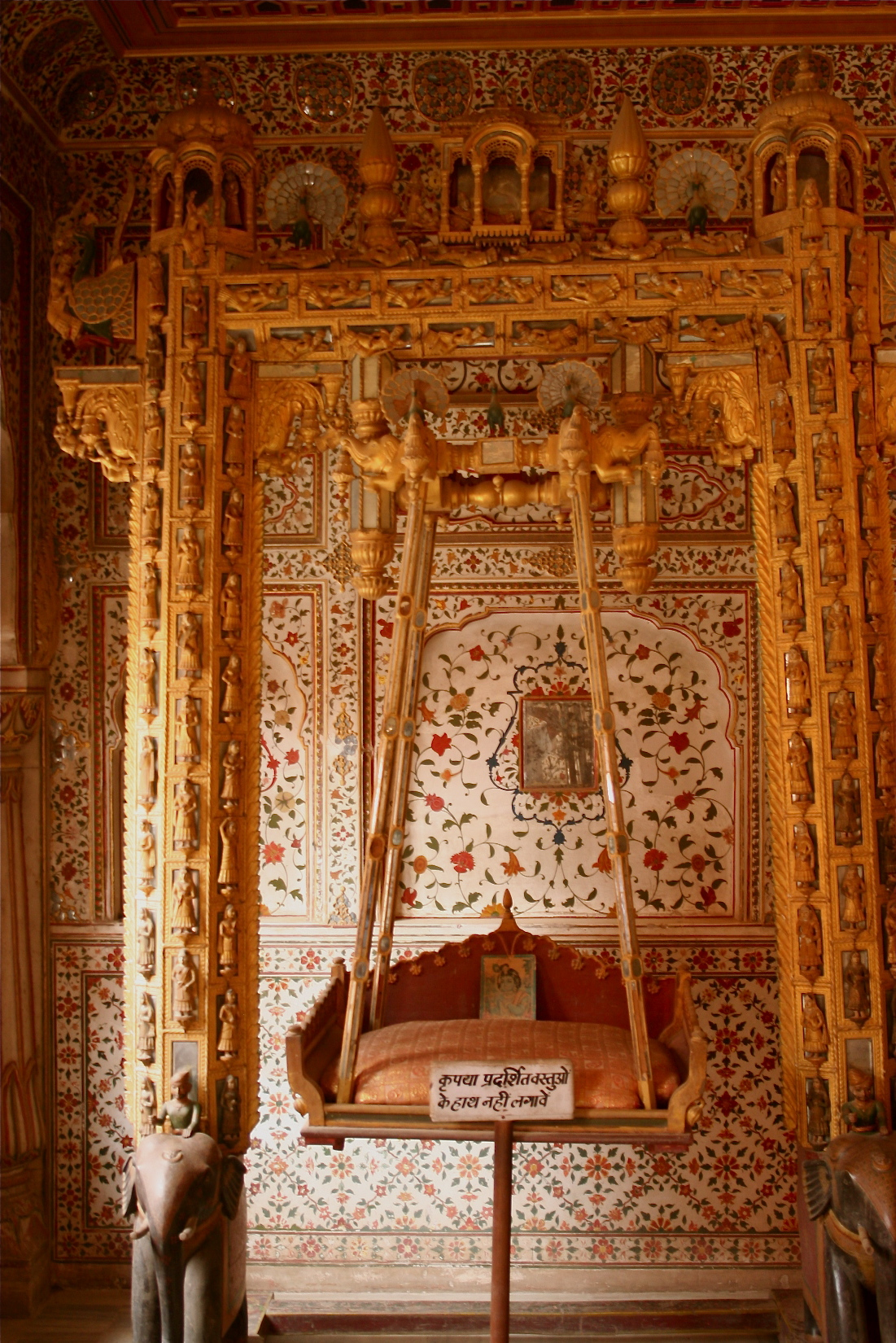
Jhoola inside the Phool Mahal, Junagarh Fort, Bikaner.

=== Overview ===
The massive fort built in the plains of Bikaner has a rectangular (quadrangular) layout with a peripheral length of 1,078 yards (986 m). The fort walls are 14.5 feet (4.4 m) wide and 40 feet (12 m) in height. It encompasses an area of 63,119 square yards (5.28 ha). It was surrounded by a moat which was 20–25 feet (6.1–7.6 m) deep with a base width of 15 feet (4.6 m) and top width of 30 feet (9.1 m). However, the moat no longer exists. The fort is well fortified with 37 bastions (‘burj’ in local language) and seven gates (two are main gates) to counter enemy attacks. The fort was built as a "new stronghold" outside of the ruins of an old fort built by Rao Bika and on the periphery of the Bikaner city walls (1.5 kilometres (0.93 mi) from the city centre); the old fort was demolished a century after it was built.

The fort with seven gates contains several palaces, pavilions and many temples of Hindu and Jain religions – the earliest dated to the 16th century. A major feature of the fort is the stone carving done in red and gold coloured sandstones. The interiors of the palaces are decorated and painted in traditional Rajasthani style. The Junagarh palaces have a large number of rooms, as every king built his own separate set of rooms, not wanting to live in his predecessors’ rooms. These structures were considered "at par with those of Louis’s France or of Imperial Russia". Several types of architectural style are discerned in the fort complex and hence it is called a true depiction of composite culture. The earliest style is of Rajput architecture, defined by Gujarati and Mughal architectural influence reflecting the association with Mughal rulers, the second type is of semi-western architecture reflecting British influence, and finally the revivalists Rajput architecture that evolved particularly during the rule of Maharaja Ganga Singh. Only the most representative of all these architectural styles are on display for visitors. Thus, the unique monuments on display in the Junagarh Fort represent sixteen successive generations of the rulers of Bikaner, starting from the end of the 16th century.

Gates

While the main entry gate was Karan Pol or Parole, facing east, the current gate of entry is called Suraj Pol (meaning the Sun gate), 'pol' also colloquially spelt prol, built in gold coloured or yellow sandstone, unlike the other gates and buildings built in red sandstone. It is the east facing gate permitting the rising Sun's rays to fall on the gate, which is considered a good omen. The doors of this gate are strengthened with iron spikes and studs to prevent ramming by elephants during an attack. At the entrance to the gate, two red stone statues of elephants with mahouts stand as sentinels. The gate was also the location for announcing the arrival and departure of royalty by musicians playing the trumpet from a gallery in the gate. The other gates are Karan Pol, Daulat Pol, Chand Pol (a double gate) and Fateh Pol; these provided access to various monuments in the fort. The Karan Pol gate is also braced with iron spikes to prevent battering of the gate by elephants. To the right of this gate is Daulat Pol. Forty-one hand imprints are seen on the Daulat Pol gate wall, in red colour, of the wives of the Maharajas of Bikaner, who committed sati (self-immolation) on the funeral pyres of their husbands who died in battle.

Between the main gate and the palace, there is a quadrangle, and then another gate called the Tripolia gate (triple gateway) before accessing the royal chambers. Next to this gate is a small temple called the Har Mandir, where the royal family used to offer worship. In the quadrangle, which houses a large pavilion with a water pool built in Carrara Italian marble. The Karan Mahal, where public audience was held in the Diwan-i-Am by Karan Singh (1631–39) and his successors till the 20th century, can also be seen in the same quadrangle.

=== Palaces ===
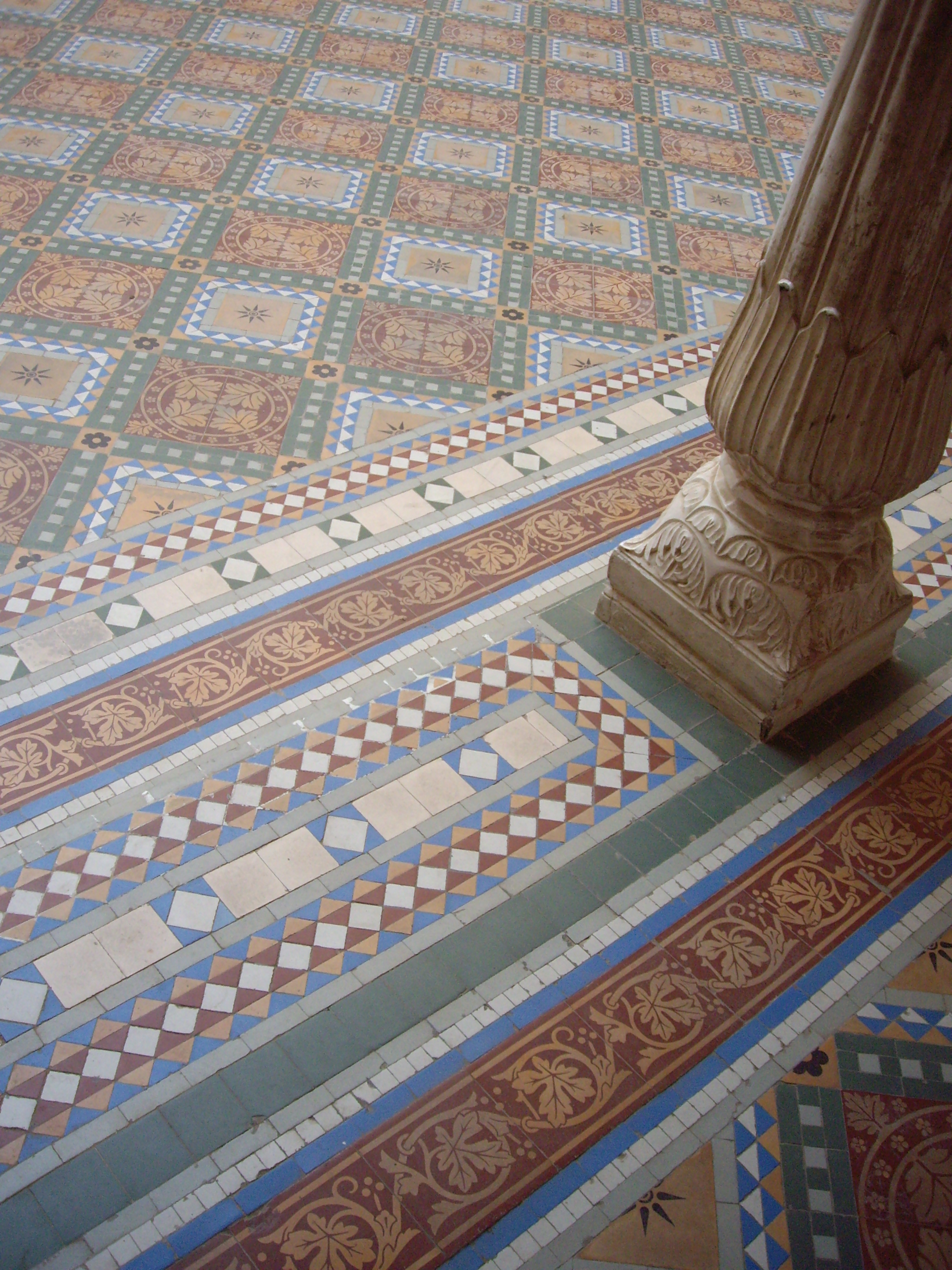
Marble tiled floor in the Junagarh palace

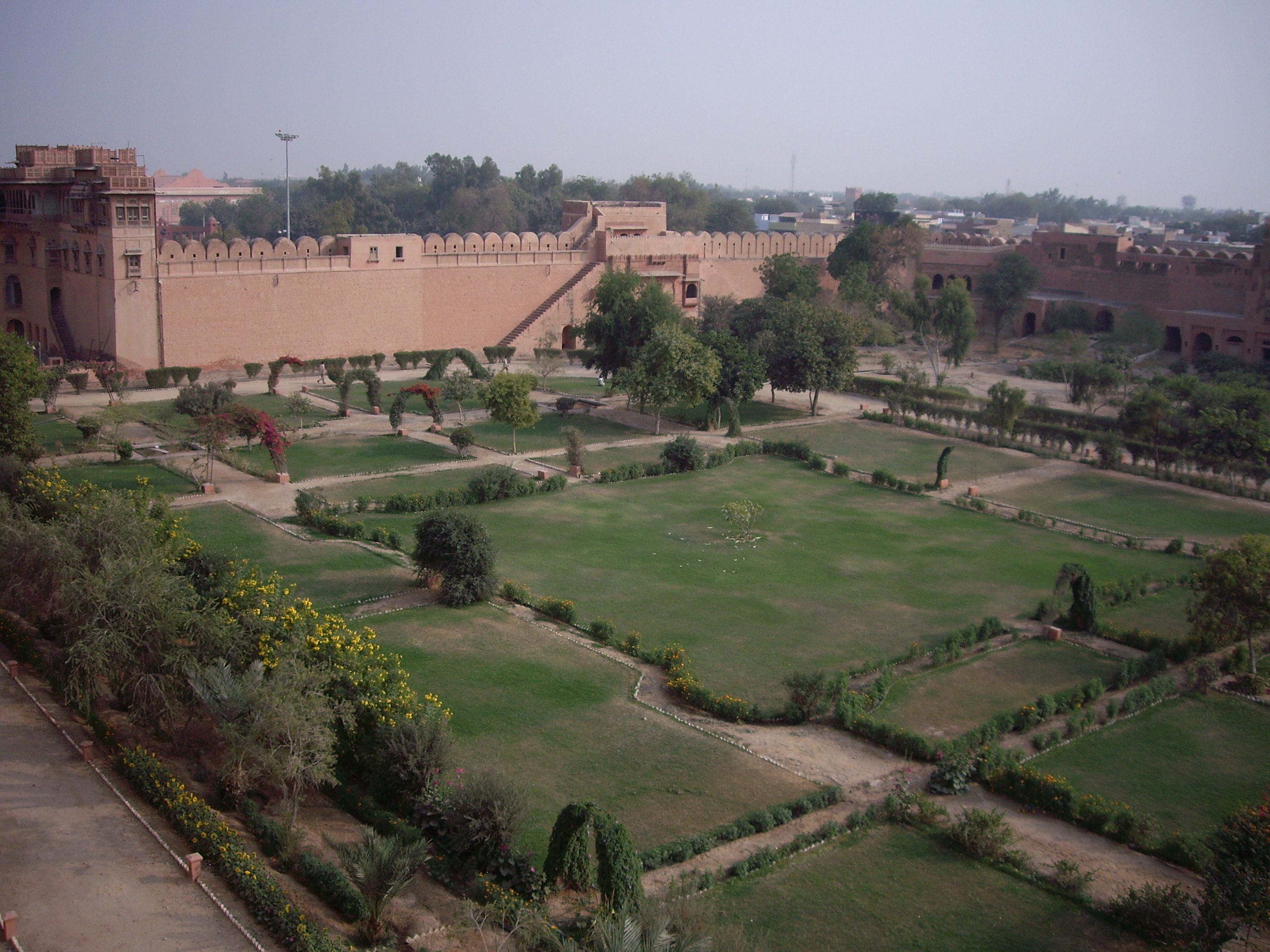
Gardens within the fort's precincts

Karan Mahal (Public Audience Hall) was built by Karan Singh in c.1680 to mark his victory over the Mughal Emperor Aurangzeb. It is considered one of the most exquisite palaces built with gardens, which displays the aesthetic sensibilities of the royalty of Rajasthan. It has stained glass windows and intricately carved balconies built in stone and wood fluted columns. Later Rajas, Anup Singh, and Surat Singh, also added a lot of glitter to this palace with inlaid polychrome glass, intricate mirror patterns, and red and gold paint. In the coronation chamber, there is a shored up alcove, which was used as a throne.

Phool Mahal ("Flower Palace") is the oldest part of the palace and was built by king Raja Rai Singh of Bikaner, who ruled between 1571 and 1668.

Anup Mahal is a multi-storey structure, which functioned as the administrative headquarters of the kingdom. It has ornate wooden ceilings with inlaid mirrors, Italian tiles, and fine lattice windows and balconies. It has some gold leaf paintings. It is considered one of the "grandest construction".

Chandra Mahal has the most luxurious room in the palace, which houses gold plated deities and paintings inlaid with precious stones. In the royal bedroom, mirrors have been strategically placed so that the Maharaja could see from his bed, any intruder entering his room.

Ganga Mahal was built in the 20th century by Ganga Singh who reigned for 56 years from 1887 to 1943, has a large durbar hall known as the Ganga Singh Hall that houses the museum. The museum has exhibits of war weaponry and also a World War I aeroplane (biplane), which is stated to be well maintained.

Badal Mahal (The weather palace) is part of the Anup Mahal extensions. It has paintings of Shekhawati Dundlod chiefs paying respects to the Maharaja of Bikaner in different types of turbans. Photos of people standing on nails, wood, swords and saws are also depicted here – a display of faith and endurance. The walls in this palace depict fresco paintings of the Hindu god Krishna and his consort Radha amidst the rain clouds.

Bikaneri Havelies located both within and outside the fort in the Bikaner city's by lanes are also of unique architectural style in home architecture. Aldous Huxley who visited these havelis reportedly said "They are the pride of Bikaner."

=== Temples ===
Har Mandir temple was the royal chapel – private temple of the royal family. The royal family celebrated the Hindu festival of Dussera and Gangaur here, apart from celebrating other family functions such as birthdays and marriages. In the Dussera celebrations, weapons and horses were worshipped here. The main deities worshipped in this temple are the Hindu deities Lakshmi Narayan, a combined representation of God Vishnu and his consort Lakshmi.

The Ratan Behari temple located near the Junagarh Fort, was built in 1846 by the 18th ruler of Bikaner. It was built in Indo-Mughal architectural style using white marble. The Hindu God Krishna is deified in this temple.

== Fort museum ==
The museum within the fort called the Junagarh Fort Museum is established in 1961 by Maharaja Dr.Karni Singhji under the control of "Maharaja Rai Singhji Trust", with the curation being done by one of his nephews Maharaj Devi Singh Ji via one his 7 closest cousin brothers in decree of relation Maharaj Chandra Singh Ji from the Ridi cadet branch of the House of Bikaner. The museum exhibits Sanskrit and Persian manuscripts, miniature paintings, jewels, royal costumes, farmans (royal orders), portrait galleries, costumes, headgear and dresses of gods’ idols, enamelware, silver, palanquins, howdahs and war drums. The museum also displays armoury that consists of one of the assorted collection of post medieval arms.

== Maharaja Rai Singhji Trust ==
Maharaja Rai Singhji Trust has been set up by the 'royal family of Bikaner' with the basic objective to showcase the fort with professional inputs in various areas and to improve the experience for visitors. Another objective is to promote education and research scholarships, cultural activities, setting up of libraries and integration with other such trusts.

== Bibliography ==
- Abram, David (2003). Rough guide to India. Rough Guides. ISBN 1-84353-089-9.
- Beny, Roland; Matheson, Sylvia A. (1984). Rajasthan - Land of Kings. London: Frederick Muller. ISBN 0-584-95061-6.
- Bradnock, Robert; Roma Bradnock (2001). Rajasthan & Gujarat Handbook: The Travel Guide. Footprint Travel Guides. ISBN 1-900949-92-X.
- Choy, Monique; Sarina Singhh (2002). Rajasthan. Lonely Planet. ISBN 1-74059-363-4.
- Crump, Vivien; Toh, Irene (1996). Rajasthan (hardback). London: Everyman Guides. ISBN 1-85715-887-3.
- Mathur, Laxman Prasad (1989). Forts and strongholds of Rajasthan. Inter-India Publications. ISBN 81-210-0229-X.
- Michell, George; Martinelli, Antonio (2005). The Palaces of Rajasthan. London: Frances Lincoln. ISBN 978-0-7112-2505-3.
- Ring, Trudy; Robert M. Salkin; Sharon La Boda (1996). International Dictionary of Historic Places: Asia and Oceania. Taylor & Francis. ISBN 1-884964-04-4.
- Stott, David (2007). Footprint Rajasthan. Footprint Travel Guides. ISBN 978-1-906098-07-0.
- Tillotson, G.H.R (1987). The Rajput Palaces - The Development of an Architectural Style (Hardback) (First ed.). New Haven and London: Yale University Press. ISBN 0-300-03738-4.
- Ward, Philip (1989). Northern India, Rajasthan, Agra, Delhi: a travel guide. Pelican Publishing Company. ISBN 0-88289-753-5.
