= List of people with surname Singh =

A number of notable people have the surname Singh:

== Notable people ==
=== A ===
- A. G. Kripal Singh (1933–1987), Indian Test cricketer, son of A. G. Ram Singh, brother of A. G. Milkha Singh
- A. G. Milkha Singh (1941–2017), Indian Test cricketer
- A. G. Ram Singh (1910–1999), Indian first-class cricketer
- Aakanksha Singh (born 1990), Indian actress
- Arti Singh, Indian television actress
- Balls Mahoney (1972–2016), American professional wrestler
- Abhimanyu Singh (born 1975), Indian film actor who works mainly in Bollywood and Telugu cinema
- Abhishek Singh (disambiguation)
- Ajai K. Singh (born 1953), Indian inorganic chemist and professor
- Ajay Singh (disambiguation)
- Ajit Singh (disambiguation)
- Akali Phula Singh (1761–1823), Sikh leader
- Akashdeep Singh (born 1994), Indian field hockey player
- Akhilesh Prasad Singh (born 1962), Member of the Lok Sabha, the lower house of the Parliament of India, for Motihari, Bihar (2004–2009)
- Akhilesh Pratap Singh (born 1960), Member of the Uttar Pradesh Legislative Assembly (2012–2017)
- Akshay Pratap Singh (born 1970), Member of the Lok Sabha for Pratapgarh, Uttar Pradesh (2004–2009)
- Alice Bhagwandai Singh (1891–1970), Surinamese-Guyanese activist and proto-feminist
- Alvin Singh (born 1988), Fijian footballer
- Amandeep Singh (disambiguation)
- Amar Singh (disambiguation)
- Amarinder Singh (born 1942), Chief Minister of Punjab (from 2017)
- Amarjit Singh (born 1970), British former wrestler
- Amit Singh (cricketer) (born 1981), Indian first-class cricketer
- Amitabha Singh, Indian cinematographer and film producer
- Amitoze Singh (born 1989), Indian first-class cricketer
- Amjyot Singh (born 1992), Indian basketball player
- Amrinder Singh (born 1993), Indian football goalkeeper
- Amrit Singh (cyclist) (born 1991), Indian track cyclist
- Amrita Singh (born 1958), Indian film and television actress
- Amritpal Singh (disambiguation)
- Analjit Singh (born 1954), Indian businessman
- Anand Singh (disambiguation)
- Anil Singh (disambiguation)
- Anmolpreet Singh, Indian cricketer
- Annu Raj Singh (born 1984), Indian shooter
- Anshuman Singh (1935–2021), Governor of the Indian states of Gujarat (1998–1999) and Rajasthan (1999–2003)
- Anshuman Singh (cricketer) (born 1999), Indian cricketer
- Anurag Singh (disambiguation)
- Anureet Singh (born 1988), Indian cricketer.
- Anushka Singh (born 1964), Indian TV actress
- Archana Puran Singh (born 1962), Actress, Reality television judges
- Ari Singh II (after 1724–1773), Maharana of Mewar, (1762–1772).
- Arijit Singh (born 1987), Indian singer
- Arjun Jang Bahadur Singh, Nepali Congress politician and royalty of Bajhang
- Arjun Singh (Madhya Pradesh politician) (1930–2011), Minister of Human Resource Development of India (2004–2009)
- Arpita Singh (born 1937), Indian artist
- Arshdeep Singh (footballer, born 1997) (born 1997), Indian football goalkeeper
- Arun Singh (disambiguation)
- Arunoday Singh (born 1983), Indian film actor
- Ashok Singh (disambiguation)
- Ashutosh Singh (tennis) (born 1982), Indian tennis player
- Ashutosh Singh (cricketer) (born 1994), Indian cricketer

=== B ===
- B. P. Singh (born 1935), Indian television producer
- Baba Singh (disambiguation)
- Babaji Singh (1947–2006), Mexican Sikh translator
- Baban Singh, Nepalese politician
- Babu Amar Singh, revolutionary in the Indian Rebellion of 1857, brother of the Kunwar Singh
- Babu Bhoop Singh, Ruler of Kohra (estate) and Leader of Indian Rebellion of 1857
- Babu Nath Singh, Member of the Lok Sabha, the lower house of the Parliament of India, for Surguja, Madhya Pradesh (1952–1977)
- Babu Singh (Rajasthan politician), Member of the Rajasthan Legislative Assembly (from 2013)
- Bachchu Singh, Member of the Rajasthan Legislative Assembly (from 2013)
- Bachittar Singh (1664–1705), Sikh martyr, general of Guru Gobind Singh
- Badan Singh (died 1755 or 1756), first Raja of the Bharatpur State (from 1722)
- Badlu Singh (1876–1918), Indian recipient of the Victoria Cross
- Baghel Singh (c. 1730 – c. 1802), leader of the Singh Krora Misl
- Bahadur Singh (disambiguation)
- Baj Singh (died 1716), Sikh general, governor, scholar and martyr
- Bajrang Bahadur Singh (1906–1973), Lieutenant Governor of the Indian state of Himachal Pradesh (1955–1963)
- Bakht Singh of Marwar (1706–1752), Maharaja of Jodhpur and Marwar
- Bakht Singh (1903–2000), Christian evangelist in India
- Bakshish Singh (1928–1970), Indian field hockey player
- Bal Krishna Singh (1916–1977), Member of the Lok Sabha for Chandauli, Uttar Pradesh (1962–1967)
- Bala Singh (1952–2019), Indian Tamil actor
- Balak Singh (1797–1862), founder of the Namdhari Sikh sect
- Balbhadra Singh (1916–1986), Raja of Raghogarh (1945–1967), Member of the Madhya Pradesh Legislative Assembly (1952–1957)
- Balbir Singh
- Baldeep Singh (footballer, born 1982), Indian football defender
- Baldeep Singh (footballer, born 1987), Indian football central midfielder
- Baldeo Singh (died 1825), Maharaja of the Bharatpur State (from 1823)
- Baldev Singh (disambiguation)
- Baljinder Singh (born 1986), Indian racewalkerb
- Baljit Singh (disambiguation)
- Balkaur Singh, Member of the Haryana Legislative Assembly
- Balkrishan Singh (1933–2004), Indian field hockey player
- Balmiki Prasad Singh (born 1942), Governor of the Indian state of Sikkim (2008–2013)
- Baltej Singh (born 1990), Indian first-class cricketer
- Balvir Singh, Freeholder in the Burlington County, New Jersey (from 2018)
- Balwant Singh (disambiguation)
- Balwinder Singh, Indian Kabaddi player
- Bana Singh (born 1949), Indian soldier and recipient of the Param Vir Chakra, the highest Indian military decoration
- Bandeep Singh (born 1989), Indian first-class cricketer
- Banshi Singh (born 1962), Member of the Uttar Pradesh Legislative Assembly (2012–2017)
- Bant Singh, Indian agricultural labour activist and singer
- Bantoo Singh (born 1963), Indian first-class cricketer
- Barkha Singh (born 1992), Indian actress and model
- Barry Singh, artistic director and conductor of the Northern Rivers Symphony Orchestra
- Basant Narain Singh (1918–1984), Member of the Lok Sabha for Hazaribagh, Jharkhand (1962–1971, 1977–1984)
- Basawon Singh or Basawon Sinha (1909–1989), Indian independence activist
- Bashistha Narain Singh, representative of the Indian state of Bihar in the Rajya Sabha, the upper house of the Indian Parliament (from 2012)
- Beant Singh (disambiguation)
- Bedashwor Singh (born 1998), Indian football midfielder
- Benedict Singh (1927–2018), Guyanese Roman Catholic bishop
- Bhabananda Singh (born 1960), representative of the Indian state of Manipur in the Rajya Sabha, the upper house of the Indian Parliament (from 2017)
- Bhagat Singh (1907–1931), Indian revolutionary
- Bhagwan Singh (1916–1995), High Commissioner of India to Fiji (1971–1976)
- Bhagwan Singh (politician), Member of the Madhya Pradesh Legislative Assembly (1957–1967)
- Bhagwat Singh of Mewar (1927–1984), titular ruler of the Mewar (Udaipur) State (1955–1971)
- Bhagwati Singh, representative of the Indian state of Uttar Pradesh in the Rajya Sabha (2004–2010)
- Bhalindra Singh (1919–1992), Indian cricketer, President of Indian Olympic Association (1960–1975, 1980–1984), son of Bhupinder Singh of Patiala
- Bharat Singh (born 1948), Member of the Lok Sabha for Ballia, Uttar Pradesh (from 2014)
- Bharatinder Singh (born 1988), Indian decathlete
- Bharti Singh (born 1984), Indian stand-up comedian and actress
- Bhawani Singh (politician) (25 May 1911 – 6 October 1956), Member of the 1st Lok Sabha (1952–1957)
- Bhawani Singh (1931–2011), last Maharaja of Jaipur
- Bhim Singh (disambiguation)
- Bhishma Narain Singh (1933–2018), Governor of the Indian state of Assam (1984–1989)
- Bhola Singh (1939–2018), politician from the Indian state of Bihar
- Bhola Singh (Uttar Pradesh politician) (born 1977), politician from the Indian state of Uttar Pradesh
- Bhopinder Singh (born 1946), Lieutenant Governor of The Andaman and Nicobar Islands (2006–2013)
- Bhrigu Nath Singh (born 1968), Indian aerospace engineer
- Bhupal Singh (1884–1955), Maharana of Udaipur (1930–1949), Rajpramukh of Rajasthan (from 1948)
- Bhupendra Singh (disambiguation)
- Bhupinder Singh (disambiguation)
- Bidyananda Singh (born 1997), Indian football defensive midfielder
- Bijendra Singh (born 1956), Member of the Lok Sabha for Aligrah, Uttar Pradesh (2004–2009)
- Bikram Singh (disambiguation)
- Bikramjeet Singh (born 1993), Indian football defender
- Bikramjit Singh (born 1992), Indian football midfielder
- Billy Arjan Singh (1917–2010), Indian conservationist
- Binod Singh (fl. 1705–1716), Sikh military leader
- Bipin Singh Thounaojam (born 1995), Indian football midfielder
- Birender Singh (disambiguation)
- Bishambar Singh (1940–2004), Indian bantamweight wrestler
- Bishamber Singh (born 1969), Member of the Haryana Legislative Assembly
- Bishan Singh (1672–1699), Maharaja of Amer (Jaipur) (1688–1699)
- Bishnu Bahadur Singh (born 1969), Nepalese boxer
- Bishwanath Singh, Indian heavyweight freestyle wrestler
- Bobby Singh (born 1975), Indo-Fijian Canadian football player
- Bobby Singh (cinematographer) (1974–2012), Indian cinematographer
- Bobby Singh (musician), Australian tabla player
- Bodhchandra Singh (1909–1955), last ruler of the Kingdom of Manipur (1941–1949)
- Boota Singh (died 1955), Sikh soldier of the British Indian Army
- Brahmeshwar Singh (1947–2012), head of the Ranvir Sena militant group
- Brajesh Singh (died 1966), Indian communist politician
- Brihaspat Singh (born 1960), Member of the Chhattisgarh Legislative Assembly (from 2013)
- Brij Bhushan Sharan Singh (born 1957), Member of the Lok Sabha for Kaiserganj, Uttar Pradesh (1991–1996 and from 1999)
- Brij Singh (born 1963), Indian financier
- Brijendra Singh (1918–1995), Maharaja of the Bharatpur State (1929–1947)
- Brijesh Singh, Member of the Uttar Pradesh Legislative Assembly (from 2017)
- Brijraj Singh (1934–2022), Maharao of Kota, Rajasthan (from 1991)
- Buckam Singh (1893–1919), Canadian Sikh war veteran
- Budhia Singh (born 2002), Indian long-distance runner
- Buta Singh (1934–2021), Minister of Home Affairs of India (1986–1989), Governor of the Indian state of Bihar (2004–2006)

=== C ===
- Chandrachur Singh (born 1968), Indian actor
- Charan Singh (disambiguation)
- Charan Singh (1902–1987), 5th Prime Minister of India
- Chaya Singh (born 1981), Indian actress
- Chinglensana Singh (footballer), also known as Sana Singh (born 1996), Indian footballer
- Chitrangada Singh (born 1976), Indian film actress
- Choudhary Piara Singh (died 2024), Indian politician

=== D ===
- Dalip Singh (disambiguation)
- Daljit Singh (disambiguation)
- Dara Singh (disambiguation)
- Darshan Singh (disambiguation)
- Davendra Singh (born 1950), Fiji Indian politician
- Davendra Singh (athlete) (born 1965), Fijian middle-distance runner
- David Joseph Singh (born 1958), theoretical physicist
- Davinder Singh (disambiguation)
- Dayal Singh (disambiguation)
- Deepika Singh (born 1989), Indian television actress
- Devendra Singh (disambiguation)
- Devendro Singh (born 1992), Indian boxer
- Devwrat Singh (1969–2021), Indian politician
- Digvijay Singh (disambiguation)
- Dilbagh Singh (1926–2001), head of the Indian Air Force (1981–1984)
- Dilbagh Singh (singer), Indian Punjabi singer-songwriter and film actor
- Dinesh Singh (disambiguation)
- Dharam Singh (disambiguation)
- Dhruv Singh (disambiguation)

=== E ===
- Ebenezer Sunder Singh (born 1967), Indo-American visual artist
- Eisha Singh (born 1998), Indian actress
- Ekendra Singh (born 1957), Indian football manager
- Elangbam Nilakanta Singh (1927–2000), Indian poet and critic
- Er Sanjeev Singh, politician from the Indian state of Bihar

=== F ===
- Fateh Singh (disambiguation)
- Fauja Singh (1911–2025), British centenarian marathon runner
- Fauja Singh (Sikh leader) (1936–1978), one of 13 Sikhs killed during a protest against the Nirankaris

=== G ===
- Gabbar Singh (disambiguation)
- Gagandeep Singh (disambiguation)
- Gajendra Singh (disambiguation)
- Ganda Singh, Indian revolutionary, member of the Ghadar Party
- Ganda Singh (historian) (1900–1987), Punjabi historian
- Ganesh Man Singh (1915–1997), Nepalese politician from Newar caste
- Ganga Singh (1880–1943), Maharaja of the princely state of Bikaner
- Gaurika Singh (born 2002), Nepalese swimmer
- Gama Singh (born 1954), Indian/Canadian professional wrestler
- Giriraj Singh (born 1952), Indian politician
- Gouramangi Singh (born 1986), Indian footballer
- Govin Singh (born 1988), Indian football defender
- Gracy Singh (born 1980), Indian actress
- Gulab Singh (disambiguation)
- Gurbaksh Singh (1895–1977), Punjabi writer
- Gurbux Singh (field hockey) (born 1936), Indian field hockey player
- Gurdial Singh (mountaineer) (1924–2023), Indian mountaineer
- Gurdial Singh (1933–2016), Indian Punjabi writer
- Gurdial Singh Phul (1911–1989), Indian Punjabi dramatist
- Gurjeet Singh (born 1994), English actor
- Gurkeerat Singh (born 1990), Indian cricketer
- Gurmail Singh (disambiguation)
- Gurmeet Ram Rahim Singh (born 1967), head of the Indian religious group Dera Sacha Sauda
- Gurmeet Singh (racewalker) (born 1985), Indian racewalker
- Gurmesh Singh, an Australian politician
- Gurmit Singh (born 1965), Singaporean former actor, host and comedy performer
- Gurmukh Singh (disambiguation)
- Gurnam Singh (disambiguation)
- Gurpreet Singh (disambiguation)
- Gurratan Singh, Canadian politician
- Guru Gobind Singh (1666–1708), Indian spiritual master, writer, warrior
- Gurvinder Singh, Indian film director
- Gurvinder Singh (cricketer) (born 1983), Indian cricketer
- Gurwinder Singh (born 1986), Indian footballer
- Gyan Singh (disambiguation)

=== H ===
- Hammir Singh or Rana Hammir (1314–1378), ruler of Mewar
- Hanut Singh (1900–1982), British Indian Army soldier and polo player
- Hanut Singh (soldier) (1933–2015), Lt General of the Indian Army
- Harbaksh Singh (1913–1999), three star General in the Indian Army
- Harbhajan Singh (poet) (1920–2002), Indian Punjabi poet, critic, cultural commentator, and translator
- Harbhajan Singh (basketball) (born 1950), Indian basketball player
- Harbhajan Singh (born 1980), Indian cricketer
- Harcharan Singh (disambiguation)
- Hardeep Singh (disambiguation)
- Hari Singh (disambiguation)
- Harivansh Narayan Singh (born 1956), Indian journalist, Deputy Chairman of the Rajya Sabha, the upper house of the Parliament of India (from 2018)
- Harivansh Singh (born 1950), Member of the Lok Sabha, the lower house of the Parliament of India, for Pratapgarh (from 2014)
- Harjeet Singh (born 1996), Indian field hockey player
- Harkirat Singh (disambiguation)
- Harmeet Singh (disambiguation)
- Harpal Singh (disambiguation)
- Harpreet Singh (disambiguation)
- Harshandeep Singh (2004–2024), Indian college student studying abroad in Canada, and an apartment security guard who was murdered while on-duty
- Hem Bahadur Singh, Former Inspector General of Nepal Police
- Hukam Singh (disambiguation)
- Hukum Singh (1938–2018), Member of the Lok Sabha, the lower house of the Parliament of India, for Kairana (2014–2018)

=== I ===
- Inder Singh (disambiguation)
- Inderjit Singh (disambiguation)
- Ishar Singh (1895–1963), Sikh soldier, recipient of the Victoria Cross
- Ishar Singh (Sikh prince) (1802-1804)
- Ishar Singh (havildar) (1850s-1897), soldier in the British Indian Army with the rank of havildar, hero of the Battle of Saragarhi
- Ishar Singh (poet) (1892–1966), one of the most renowned Punjabi humorous poets of the 20th century
- Ishar Singh (artist) (1860–1910s), Sikh artist
- Ivy Singh-Lim (born 1949), Singaporean farmer, businesswoman and netball official

=== J ===
- Jackichand Singh (born 1992), Indian footballer
- Jadunath Singh (1916–1948), Indian Army soldier, posthumous recipient of the Param Vir Chakra, the highest Indian military decoration
- Jagmeet Singh (born 1979), Canadian New Democratic Party leader
- Jagdeep Singh (disambiguation)
- Jagdeo Singh (born 1966), Trinidadian and Tobagonian attorney and politician
- Jagjit Singh (disambiguation)
- Jagmal Singh (died 1583), son of Udai Singh II, Maharana of Mewar
- Jagmal Singh (athlete) (1923–?), Indian long-distance runner
- Jai Singh (disambiguation)
- Jaideva Singh (1893–1986), Indian musicologist and philosopher
- Jamuna Sharan Singh (born 1941), Indian ecologist
- Jarnail Singh Bhindranwale (1947–1984), Sikh religious leader
- Jasdev Singh, Indian sports commentator
- Jasjit Singh (disambiguation)
- Jaskaran Singh (disambiguation)
- Jaspal Singh (disambiguation)
- Jaswant Singh (disambiguation)
- Jaswinder Singh (disambiguation)
- Jaya Prithvi Bahadur Singh (1877–1940), Nepalese educator and writer, former vassal king of Bajhang kingdom
- Jeev Milkha Singh (born 1971), Indian golfer
- Jitendra Singh (disambiguation)
- Jodh Singh (1882–1981), Sikh theologian and social activist
- Joginder Singh (disambiguation)
- Jyot Singh, American politician

=== K ===
- Kaajee Singh (1945–2025), Indian percussionist
- Kalyan Singh (1932–2021), Governor of Rajasthan (from 2014)
- Kanwaljit Singh (disambiguation)
- Karam Singh (disambiguation)
- Karan Singh (disambiguation)
- Karanjit Singh (born 1986), Indian football goalkeeper
- Karpal Singh (1940–2014), Malaysian politician and lawyer
- Kartar Singh (disambiguation)
- Kedarnath Singh (1934–2018), Indian Hindi poet
- Kehar Singh (1935–1989), convicted conspirator in the plot of the Indira Gandhi assassination
- Kehar Singh (physicist) (born 1941), Indian optical physicist
- Khem Karan Singh (1926–2016), Lt General of Indian Army
- Khushwant Singh (1915–2014), Indian writer and politician
- Kirpal Singh (disambiguation)
- Kirti Vardhan Singh (born 1966), Member of the Lok Sabha, the lower house of the Parliament of India, for Gonda, Uttar Pradesh (from 2014)
- Kishan Singh of Bharatpur (1899–1929), Maharaja of Bharatpur (1918–1929)
- Kishan Singh (biologist) (born 1931), Indian plant pathologist
- Kishen Singh, Indian polo player
- Krishna Singh (disambiguation)
- Kumar Suresh Singh (1935–2006), Indian anthropologist
- Kunwar Indrajit Singh, Prime Minister of Nepal and royalty of Doti
- Kunwar Singh (disambiguation)
- Kushal Pal Singh (born 1931), Indian real estate developer

=== L ===
- Lakshman Singh (disambiguation)
- Lakshmi Singh, American newscaster
- Lalji Singh (1947–2017), Indian zoologist and geneticist
- Lallan Prasad Singh (1912–1998), Indian civil servant
- Lallu Singh (born 1954), Member of the Lok Sabha, the lower house of the Parliament of India, for Faizabad, Uttar Pradesh (from 2014)
- Laxmi Singh (born 1974), first woman police commissioner of U.P.
- Lilly Singh (born 1988), Canadian YouTuber
- Linda L. Singh, major general of the Maryland Army National Guard
- Lisa Singh (born 1972), Australian politician
- Luther Singh (born 1997), South African footballer

=== M ===
- Mahavir Singh (disambiguation)
- Mahender Singh, Indian politician
- Mahendra Singh (disambiguation)
- Makhan Singh (disambiguation)
- Mamik Singh (born 1963), Indian TV actor
- Man Singh I (1550–1614), general of the Mughal emperor Akbar and Rajput Raja of Amer
- Man Singh II (1912–1970), last ruling Maharaja of Jaipur State (1922–1948)
- Manandeep Singh (born 1992), Indian footballer
- Mandeep Singh (born 1991), Indian cricketer
- Mandeep Singh (field hockey) (born 1995), Indian field hockey player
- Mangala Devi Singh, Nepalese politician
- Manik Singh, Member of the Lok Sabha, the lower house of the Parliament of India, for Sidhi (2007–2009)
- Maninder Singh (actor) (born 27 September 1980), Indian TV actor
- Manjeet Singh (disambiguation)
- Manjit Singh (disambiguation)
- Manjot Singh (cricketer) (born 1987), Australian cricketer
- Manjot Singh (born July 1992), Indian film actor
- Manmohan Singh (1932–2024), Indian Prime Minister (2004–2014)
- Manmohan Singh (film director), Indian film director and cinematographer
- Manorama Singh (1938–2024), Indian politician
- Manpreet Singh (boxer) (born 1985), Indian amateur boxer
- Manpreet Singh (Italian cricketer) (born 1985), Italian cricketer
- Manpreet Singh (field hockey) (born 1992), Indian field hockey player
- Manvendra Singh (born 1962), Indian politician
- Martand Singh (1923–1995), Indian wildlife conservationist, Member of the Lok Sabha, the lower house of the Parliament of India, for Rewa (1971–1977, 1980–1989)
- Meinam Bhorot Singh, Indian politician
- Mika Singh (born 1977), Indian musician
- Milan Singh (born 1992), Indian footballer
- Milkha Singh (1929–2021), Indian track and field sprinter
- Mohan Singh (disambiguation)
- Mona Singh (born 1981), Indian actress and television presenter
- Mona Singh (scientist), American Professor of Computer Science

=== N ===
- Raja Nain Singh Nagar Gurjar of Parichhatgarh was a king of Bahsuma, Hastinapur and Parikshitgarh in the Indian state of Uttar Pradesh during the 18th century
- N. Biren Singh (born 1961), Chief Minister of Manipur (from 2017)
- Ningthoukhongjam Khelchandra Singh (1920–2011), Indian writer, lexicographer and historian
- Nagendra Singh (1914–1988), Indian lawyer
- Naipal Singh (1940–2020), Member of the Lok Sabha, the lower house of the Parliament of India, for Rampur, Uttar Pradesh (from 2014)
- Nalini Singh (born 1945), Indian journalist
- Nalini Singh (author) (born 1977), New Zealand author
- Nalini Singh (human rights activist), Fiji
- Natwar Singh (born 1931), Indian bureaucrat
- Navdeep Singh (disambiguation)
- Navjot Singh, known as Mr. Nobodydudy, an Indian vlogger, content creator, and comedian based in the Philippines
- Nawab Kapur Singh (1697–1753), Jathedar of Akal Takht (from 1737)
- Neetu Singh (born 1958), Indian Hindi film actress
- Ningthoujam Pritam Singh (born 1993), Indian footballer
- Nirbhay N. Singh, psychologist and mindfulness researcher
- Niruta Singh, Indian actress
- Nishant Singh Malkani (born 1987), Indian model and actor

=== O ===
- O. Joy Singh, chief of the Manipur People's Party
- O. P. Singh (born 1960), Director General of Uttar Pradesh Police (from 2018)
- Okram Bikram Singh (born 1985), Indian track cyclist
- Okram Ibobi Singh (born 1948), Chief Minister of the Indian state of Manipur (2002–2017)
- Om Prakash Singh, Member of the Legislative Assembly of the Indian state of Uttar Pradesh (2007–2012)
- Omkar Singh (born 1984), Indian shooter
- Omid Singh (born 1991), Iranian football midfielder
- Omprakash Singh (born 1959), Member of the Lok Sabha, the lower house of the Parliament of India, for Ghazipur, Uttar Pradesh (1998–1999)
- Onkar Singh (politician), Member of the Uttar Pradesh Legislative Assembly (1952–1957) and Legislative Council (1958–1962)

=== P ===
- Pankaj Singh (politician) (born 1978), Member of the Legislative Assembly of the Indian state of Uttar Pradesh (from 2017)
- Pankaj Singh (cricketer) (born 1985), Indian cricketer
- Paramjit Singh (disambiguation)
- Parmjit Singh (disambiguation)
- Pawan Singh, Indian Bhojpuri playback singer and film actor
- Phatte Bahadur Singh (1902–1983), Nepalese writer from Newar caste
- Piru Singh (1918–1948), Company Havildar Major of the Indian Army, posthumous recipient of the Param Vir Chakra, the highest Indian military decoration
- Prabhjot Singh (field hockey) (born 1980), Indian field hockey forward
- Prabhjot Singh (physician) (born 1982)
- Prabhsimran Singh, Indian cricketer and cousin of Anmolpreet Singh.
- Prakash Man Singh (born 1956), Nepalese politician from Newar caste
- Pratap Singh (disambiguation)
- Pratibha Singh (born 1956), Member of the Lok Sabha, the lower house of the Parliament of India, for Mandi, Himachal Pradesh (2004–2009, 2013–2014)
- Princess Shanti Singh of Nepal (1940–2001), Nepalese princess
- Pritam Singh (Uttarakhand politician) (born 1958), Indian politician
- Pritam Singh (Singaporean politician) (born 1976), Singaporean politician and lawyer

=== R ===
- R. K. Singh (born 1952), Indian minister of state (independent charge)
- Ratanjit Pratap Narain Singh (born 1964), Member of the Lok Sabha, the lower house of the Parliament of India, for Kushi Nagar (2009–2014)
- R. P. Singh (born 1985), Indian cricketer,
- Rabinder Singh (disambiguation)
- Rachna Singh, Canadian politician and trade unionist
- Radha Mohan Singh (born 1949), Minister of Agriculture and Farmers Welfare of India (from 2014)
- Raghubir Singh (disambiguation)
- Raghuraj Pratap Singh (born 1968), Indian politician from Uttar Pradesh
- Rahul Singh (disambiguation)
- Raj Singh (disambiguation)
- Rajendra Singh (disambiguation)
- Rajesh Singh (disambiguation)
- Rajinder Singh (disambiguation)
- Rajkumar Singh (disambiguation)
- Rajkumari Singh (disambiguation)
- Rajnath Singh (born 1951), Minister of Home Affairs of India (from 2014)
- Raju Singh (born 1969), Indian film and TV background score composer, music director, singer, and musician
- Rajveer Singh (born 1959), Member of the Lok Sabha, the lower house of the Parliament of India, for Etah, Uttar Pradesh (from 2014)
- Rakul Preet Singh (born 1990), South Indian film actress and model
- Ram Singh (disambiguation)
- Raman Singh (born 1952), Chief Minister of the Indian state of Chhattisgarh (from 2003)
- Ramandeep Singh (disambiguation)
- Ramjee Singh (born 1927), Indian politician, educator, and Gandhian activist
- Rampal Singh (disambiguation)
- Ranbir Singh of Jammu and Kashmir (1830–1885), Maharaja of Jammu and Kashmir (from 1857)
- Randhir Singh (disambiguation)
- Ranjin Singh (born 1975), Indian-American professional wrestling manager and writer
- Ranjit Singh (disambiguation)
- Ranveer Singh (born 1985), Indian actor
- Ranvir Singh (born 1977), English television presenter and journalist
- Rao Inderjit Singh (born 1951), Indian politician
- Ravi Inder Singh (industrialist) (born 1940), Indian industrialist and politician
- Ravi Inder Singh (cricketer) (born 1987), Indian cricketer
- Ravinder Singh (disambiguation)
- Reagan Singh (born 1991), Indian footballer
- Renedy Singh (born 1979), Indian former football player and coach
- Richa Singh, Indian computer scientist
- Rinku Singh (baseball) (born 1988), Indian professional wrestler and retired professional baseball player
- Ritika Singh (born 1994), Indian actress and mixed martial artist
- Robin Singh (disambiguation)
- Roshan Singh (1892–1927), Indian revolutionary
- Rudra Pratap Singh (disambiguation)
- Rupinder Pal Singh (born 1990), Indian field hockey player

=== S ===
- S. G. Thakur Singh (1899–1976), Indian artist
- S. K. Singh (disambiguation)
- Sadhu Singh (born 1941), Member of the Lok Sabha, the lower house of the Parliament of India, for Faridkot, Punjab (from 2014)
- Sadhu Singh (athlete), Indian racewalker
- Sajjan Singh (disambiguation)
- Sam Singh (born 1971), American politician
- Sanam Singh (born 1988), Indian tennis player
- Sandeep Singh (disambiguation)
- Sangram Singh (born 1985), Indian wrestler, actor and motivational speaker
- Sanjay Singh (disambiguation)
- Sara Singh (born c. 1985), Canadian politician
- Sarabjit Singh (1963 or 1964–2013), Indian national convicted of terrorism and spying by a Pakistani court
- Sarika Singh (disambiguation)
- Sarpreet Singh (born 1999), New Zealand footballer
- Sartaj Singh (disambiguation)
- Satendra Singh (disambiguation)
- Satpal Singh (born 1955), Indian wrestler and wrestling coach
- Satwant Singh (1962–1989), Sikh bodyguard and assassin of Indira Gandhi
- Satyapal Singh (disambiguation)
- Saurabh Singh (disambiguation)
- Sawarn Singh (born 1990), Indian rower
- Schandra Singh (born 1977), American artist
- Seityasen Singh (born 1992), Indian footballer
- Shabeg Singh (1925–1984), military adviser to Jarnail Singh Bhindranwale, the leader of Damdami Taksal
- Shailendra Singh (disambiguation)
- Shaitan Singh (1924–1962), Indian Army officer and recipient of the Param Vir Chakra, the highest India highest military decoration
- Shakti Singh (disambiguation)
- Shara Singh, South African politician
- Sher Singh (disambiguation)
- Shubhdeep Singh Sidhu, known as Sidhu Moose Wala (1993–2022), Indian singer and politician
- Shilpa Singh (born 1988), Indian singer, dancer, and model
- Sidharth Nath Singh (born 1963), Minister of Health in the Government of the Indian state of Uttar Pradesh (from 2017)
- Simon Singh (born 1964), British popular science author
- Simone Singh (born 1974), Indian actress
- Sobha Singh (disambiguation)
- Sophia Duleep Singh (1876–1948), English suffragette
- Sonia Singh (born 1964), Indian TV actress
- Sriram Singh (born 1948), Indian track athlete, 800 metres
- Sucha Singh (disambiguation)
- Suchitra Singh (born 1977), Indian cricketer
- Sukhdev Singh (disambiguation)
- Sukhwinder Singh (disambiguation)
- Sundar Singh (disambiguation)
- Sunder Singh (disambiguation)
- Sunny Singh (disambiguation)
- Surendra Singh (disambiguation)
- Surinder Singh (disambiguation)
- Sushant Singh (born 1972), Indian film and television actor and presenter
- Sushant Singh Rajput (1884–2020), Indian actor
- Sushil Kumar Singh (politician) (born 1963), Member of the Lok Sabha, the lower house of the Parliament of India, for Aurangabad, Bihar (1998–1999 and from 2009)
- Sushil Kumar Singh (born 1982), Indian footballer
- Sushil Singh (born 1976), Member of the Uttar Pradesh Legislative Assembly (from 2017)
- Swaran Singh (1907–1994), Indian cabinet minister
- Swarup Singh (disambiguation)
- Shilpi Singh is an Indian women's rights activist

=== T ===
- T. Raja Singh (born 1978), Member of the Telangana Legislative Assembly (from 2014)
- T. Sher Singh (born 1949), Canadian lawyer
- Tajinder Singh (born 1992), Indian cricketer
- Takht Singh (1819–1873), last Maharaja of Ahmednagar (1841–1843)
- Talwinder Singh (born 1994), Indian field hockey player
- Tan Singh (1924–1979), Member of the Lok Sabha, the lower house of the Parliament of India, for, (1962–1967, 1977–1980)
- Tara Singh (disambiguation)
- Tarjinder Singh (born 1987), Indian first-class cricketer
- Tarlochan Singh (born 1933), Press Secretary to President of India (1983–1987), representative of the Indian state of Haryana in the Rajya Sabha, the upper house of the Parlianment of India (2004–2010)
- Tarlok Singh (disambiguation)
- Tarsem Singh (field hockey) (1946–2005), Indian field hockey player
- Tarsem Singh (born 1961), Indian film director
- Tavleen Singh (born 1950), Indian columnist, political reporter and writer
- Tej Singh (disambiguation)
- Teja Singh (disambiguation)
- Tejeshwar Singh (1947–2007), Indian publisher, journalist, newscaster and theater activist
- Tejpal Singh (born 1949), Member of the Uttar Pradesh Legislative Assembly (1993–1995, 2002–2007, and from 2012)
- Thakur Ram Singh (disambiguation)
- Thakur Vishva Narain Singh (1928–2009), Indian journalist and Braille editor
- Thoi Singh (disambiguation), several Indian footballers
- Thoiba Singh (born 1961), Indian field hockey player
- Tiffany Singh (born 1978), New Zealand artist
- Tiger Ali Singh (born 1971), Indo-Canadian professional wrestler, son of Tiger Jeet Singh (Jagjeet Singh Hans)
- Tiger Jeet Singh (born 1944), Indo-Canadian professional wrestler
- Tikam Singh (born 1968), Indian cricketer
- Tom Singh (born 1949), founder of the New Look chain of fashion stores in the United Kingdom
- Tomba Singh (born 1982), Indian football midfielder
- Toni-Ann Singh (born 1996), Jamaican American singer and beauty queen
- Tony Singh (Rajinder Tony Singh Kusbia, born 1971), Scottish celebrity chef and restaurateur
- Trilochan Singh (1923–2008), Indian field hockey player

=== U ===
- Udai Singh (disambiguation)
- Uday Singh (disambiguation)
- Udham Singh (disambiguation)
- Ujjal Singh (1895–1983), Governor of the Indian states of Punjab (1965–1966) and Tamil Nadu (1966–1967)
- Upasana Singh (born 1970), Indian actress and stand-up comedian
- Upinder Singh, head of the History Department at the University of Delhi
- Urmila Singh (1946–2018), Governor of the Indian state of Himachal Pradesh (2010–2015)
- Uttam Singh (born 1948), Indian music director and violinist

=== V ===
- Vijay Singh Pathik (born Bhoop Singh; 1882–1954), popularly known as Rashtriya Pathik, Indian revolutionary
- V. P. Singh (1931–2008), Prime Minister of India (1989–1990)
- Vashishtha Narayan Singh, mathematician (1946–2019)
- Vineeta Singh (born 1983), Indian entrepreneur and CEO, co-founder of Sugar Cosmetics
- Vijay Singh (disambiguation)
- Vijender Singh (born 1985), Indian boxer
- Vikram Singh (disambiguation)
- Vindu Dara Singh (born 1964), Indian film and television actor
- Vir Singh (disambiguation)
- Virat Singh, Indian cricketer
- Virbhadra Singh (1934–2021), Indian politician
- Virendra Singh (disambiguation)
- Vishal Singh (born 16 January 1974), Indian TV actor
- Vivek Singh (disambiguation)

=== W ===
- Wilmeth Sidat-Singh (1918–1943), African-American basketball and football player

=== Y ===
- Yadavindra Singh (1914–1974), Indian cricketer, Maharaja of Patiala (from 1938), Rajpramukh of the Patiala and East Punjab States Union
- Yadwinder Singh (born 1986), Indian basketball player
- Yashwant Singh (disambiguation)
- Yo Yo Honey Singh (born 1983), Indian rapper
- Yograj Singh (born 1958), Indian cricketer
- Yudhvir Singh (1897–1983), Indian freedom fighter and politician
- Yuvraj Singh (born 1981), Indian cricketer

=== Z ===
- Zail Singh (1916–1994), President of India (1982–1987)
- Zorawar Singh (disambiguation)

== Fictional characters ==
- David Singh (character), DC Comics character
- Khan Noonien Singh, villain in Star Trek

== See also ==
- Matt Sing (born 1975), Australian rugby league footballer
