= Anil Singh =

Anil Singh may refer to:

- Anil Singh (javelin thrower) (born 1985), Indian track and field athlete
- Anil Singh (politician) (born 1967), Indian politician from Bihar
- Anil C. Singh, Indian lawyer and politician
- Anil Kumar Singh (chemist), Indian chemist
- Anil Kumar Singh (politician), Indian politician
