= Jaswinder =

Jaswinder may refer to:

- Jaswinder (poet), Punjabi poet
- Jaswinder Bhalla (1960–2025), Indian actor and comedian
- Jaswinder Bolina (born 1978), American poet and essayist
- Jaswinder Brar, Indian folk singer
- Jaswinder Kaur, Indian pilot
- Jaswinder Singh (disambiguation)
