= Hari Singh (disambiguation) =

Hari Singh was the ruler of the princely state of Jammu and Kashmir, at the time of Indian independence.

Hari Singh may also refer to:

- Hari Singh (administrator) (1910–2003), Inspector General of Forests of India in the 1960s
- Hari Singh (athlete) (born 1961), former marathon runner from India
- Hari Singh (soldier) (1922–2003), Indian Army officer
- Hari Kishore Singh (1934–2013), Indian politician from Bihar
- Hari Krishna Singh, Indian politician from Madhya Pradesh
- Hari Naraian Singh, Indian politician from Himachal Pradesh
- Hari Narayan Singh (1864–1949), Indian wrestler
- Satguru Hari Singh, leader of the Namdhari Sikhs
- Manbir Singh Chaheru (1959-1987), alias Hari Singh, Indian Sikh militant, leader of the Khalistan Commando Force

== See also ==
- Hari Singh Gour (1870–1949), Indian lawyer, jurist, educationist, social reformer, poet, and novelist
- Hari Singh Dhillon (died 1764), Sikh warrior
- Hari Singh Dilbar, Indian writer and poet in the Punjabi-language
- Hari Singh Mahua, Indian politician
- Hari Singh Nalwa (1791–1837), Sikh warrior
- Hari Singh Zira, Indian politician
