= Baba Singh =

Baba Singh may refer to:

- Baba Bujha Singh (died 1970), Indian revolutionary leader
- Baba Darbara Singh (1644–1734), second Jathedar of Khalsa Panth Budha Dal (1716–1734)
- Baba Deep Singh (1682–1757), martyr in Sikhism
- Baba Dyal Singh (1783–1855)
- Baba Gurdit Singh (1860–1954), central figure in the Komagata Maru incident of 1914
- Baba Gurmukh Singh (1888–1977), Ghadr revolutionary and a Sikh leader
- Baba Harbhajan Singh (1946–1968), Indian army soldier
- Baba Hardev Singh, also known as Nirankari Baba (1954–2016), Indian spiritual teacher
- Baba Kashmira Singh, head of the Sidhant Sant Samaj/Gurbani (Gurmati) Sidhant Pracharak Sant Samaj, a pro-Gurmat organization in Jalandhar, India
- Baba Kharak Singh (1867–1963), Sikh political leader
- Baba Sewa Singh, Indian social worker and environmentalist
- Baba Sucha Singh, Indian politician
- Baba Umad Singh (fl. 19th century), spiritual leader in Rajasthan, India
