= Sartaj =

Sartaj is a masculine given name of Persian origin found in India and Pakistan. Notable people with this name include:

== Given name ==
- Sartaj Aziz (1929–2024), Pakistani economist and strategist
- Sartaj Garewal, British actor
- Sartaj Gill, Indian television actor
- Sartaj Sahni (born 1949), Indian-American computer scientist
- Sartaj Singh, multiple people

== See also ==
- Satinder Sartaaj, an Indian singer
- Deshon Ka Sartaj Bharat, an Indian military song
- Mere Sartaj (1975), an Indian movie
- Sartaj Mera Tu Raaj Mera (2015), a Pakistani soap series
