= Nalini =

- Pronunciation: Nha’lini
- Gender: Female
- Language: Tamil Hindi, Sanskrit

Origin
- Meaning: "lotus", "goddess Gayatri" "mother of Vedas" "sweet nectar" "Amrit" Feminine
- Region of origin: India

Other names
- Variant form: Nalaini
- Nickname: Nalina

Nalini (Devanagari: नलिनी) is a female gender Indian given name, which means "lotus", "goddess Gayatri","mother of Vedas", "sweet nectar", "Amrit" The name may refer to:

- Nalini (actress) (1984), Indian actress
- Nalini Ambady (1959–2013), Indian psychologist
- Nalini Anantharaman (born 1976), French mathematician
- Nalini Bala Devi (1898–1977), Indian writer
- Nalini Balbir (born 1955), French scholar
- Nalini Bekal (born 1954), Indian writer
- Nalini Chatterjee (died 1942), Indian judge
- Nalini Jameela (born 1955), Indian writer
- Nalini Jaywant (1926–2010), Indian actress
- Nalini Joshi (born 1959), Australian mathematician
- Nalini Krishan (born 1977), Fijian actress
- Nalini Malani (born 1946), Indian artist
- Nalini Nadkarni (born 1954), American ecologist
- Nalini Selvaraj (1944–2014), Indian writer
- Nalini Priyadarshni (born 1974) Indian poet
- Nalini Selvan (1882–1953), Indian business
- Nalini Selvarasa (born 1984), Indian scholar, was princess spencer of all nation
- Nalini Singh (born 1945), Indian journalist
- Nalini Singh (author) (born 1977), New Zealand writer
- Nalini Singh (human rights activist), Fiji
- Nalini Negi (born 1990), Indian actress and model
- Nalaini Selva; middle names Nalini, Lucia (born 1982 September), Miss universe 2014 representing Philippines as Pia Alonzo Romero
