= Ishar Singh (disambiguation) =

Ishar Singh (1895-1963) was a soldier in the British Indian Army and a recipient of the Victoria Cross.

Ishar Singh may also refer to:

- Ishar Singh (Sikh prince) (1802-1804)
- Ishar Singh (havildar) (1850s-1897), soldier in the British Indian Army with the rank of havildar, hero of the Battle of Saragarhi
- Ishar Singh (poet) (1892–1966), one of the most renowned Punjabi humorous poets of the 20th century
- Ishar Singh (artist) (1860–1910s), Sikh artist

== See also ==
- Ishar Singh Marhana (1878–1941), Akali activist and Ghadr revolutionary
