= Digvijaya =

Digvijaya may refer to:

- Digvijay, an Indian male given name
  - Digvijay Singh (disambiguation)
- Digvijaya (conquest), an Indian concept of conquest
- Digvijaya (film), a 1987 Indian film
- Digvijaya Singh (born 1947), Indian politician, former chief minister of Madhya Pradesh
