= Kartar Singh (disambiguation) =

Kartar Singh (born 1953) is an Indian wrestler.

Kartar Singh may also refer to:

== People ==
- Kartar Singh Jhabbar (1874–1962), India Sikh religious leader
- Kartar Singh Sarabha (1896–1915), Indian revolutionary
- Kartar Singh Komal (1913-1992), Indian gyani
- Kartar Singh Duggal (1917–2012), Indian writer in Punjabi, Hindi, Urdu and English
- Kartar Singh Thind (1917-1991), Indian botanist
- Kartar Singh Bhadana (born 1955), Indian politician
- Kartar Singh Tanwar (born 1962), Indian politician
- Kartar Singh (born 1928), Sikh musician

== Films ==
- Kartar Singh (film), a 1959 Pakistani film
