= Digvijay =

Given name

Digvijay is a given name. Notable people with the name include:

- Digvijay Bhonsale (born 1989), Indian Rock and Metal vocalist, guitarist and songwriter
- Digvijay Narayan Chaubey, Indian politician and a member of 17th Legislative Assembly of Uttar Pradesh of India
- Digvijay Deshmukh (born 1998), Indian cricketer
- Digvijay Nath (1894–1969), the mahant of the Gorakhnath Math in Gorakhpur, India
- Digvijay Narain Singh (1924–1991), Indian politician who served as a Member of Parliament
- Digvijay Singh (Bihar politician) (1955–2010), Indian politician from the state of Bihar
- Digvijay Singh (golfer) (born 1972), professional golfer from India
- Digvijaya Singh (born 1947), Indian politician and a Member of Parliament in the Rajya Sabha
- Digvijay Singh (Rajasthan politician), Minister of Agriculture of Rajasthan
- Kanwar Digvijay Singh (born 1961), Indian businessman turned politician and Member of Parliament (MP)
- Kunwar Digvijay Singh (1922–1978), popularly known as "Babu", Indian field hockey player

== See also ==
- Param Digvijay Dal, registered political party of India
- Digvijay Stadium, an international multi-sports stadium in Rajnandgaon, India
- Digvijaya (disambiguation)
- Vijay (disambiguation)
