= Anurag Singh =

Anurag Singh may refer to:

- Anurag Singh (cricketer, born 1975), Indian-born cricketer who played in English county cricket during the 1990s and 2000s
- Anurag Singh (cricketer, born 1990), Indian cricketer for Madhya Pradesh
- Anurag Singh (director), Indian film director from Punjab
- Anurag Singh (filmmaker) (born 1968), Indian filmmaker from Varanasi
- Anurag Singh (musician) (born 1966), Indian musician from Amritsar
- Anurag Singh (politician) (born 1971), Indian politician from Uttar Pradesh

== See also ==
- Anurag Kashyap (born 1972), in full Anurag Singh Kashyap, Indian filmmaker
