= Jaspal =

Jaspal is a given name. Notable people with the name include:

- Jaspal Atwal (born 1955), Indo-Canadian businessman
- Jaspal Bhatti (1955–2012), Indian actor
- Jaspal Parmar (born 1984), Indian footballer
- Jaspal Rana (1976–2026), Indian sport shooter
- Jaspal Singh (disambiguation), multiple people
