= Dinesh Singh =

Dinesh Singh may refer to:

- Dinesh Singh (academic), former Vice Chancellor of University of Delhi
- Dinesh Singh (politician, born 1925) (1925–1995), Indian politician and former Minister of External Affairs of India
- Dinesh Singh (Punjab politician) (born 1962), Indian politician and Deputy Speaker of Punjab Legislative Assembly
- Dinesh Singh (footballer) (born 1989), Indian footballer
- Dinesh Prasad Singh (born 1959), Indian politician and member of the Bihar Legislative Council
- Dinesh Kumar Singh, Indian politician
- Dinesh Pratap Singh (born 1967), Indian politician
- Kanwar Dinesh Singh, (born 1973) Indian writer
