= Virender Singh =

Virender Singh may refer to:

- Virender Singh (judge) (born 1954), Indian judge
- Virender Singh (wrestler, born 1970), Indian freestyle wrestler
- Virender Singh (wrestler, born 1986), deaf Indian freestyle wrestler
- Choudhary Virender Singh, Indian politician

== See also ==
- Virendra Singh (disambiguation)
