= Sarika Singh =

Sarika Singh is the name of:

- Sarika Devendra Singh Baghel (born 1980), Indian politician
- Sarika Singh (Thangka painter) (born 1976), painter and teacher
- Sarika Singh, actress in Kaamyaab and Saas, Bahu Aur Flamingo
