= Ambedkar Samaj Party =

Political party in India

Ambedkar Society Party Ambedkar Samaj Party
- Abbreviation: ASP
- Leader: Tej Singh
- Founded: 1995
- Ideology: Ambedkarism; Anti-Hindu nationalism

Ambedkar Samaj Party (Ambedkar Society Party) is a political party in India, that fights for the rights of Dalits. The party is opposed to Hindu nationalism, which it sees as representing an upper caste minority. ASP claims that Bahujan Samaj Party has betrayed dalits through its alliance with Bharatiya Janata Party. The leader of ASP is Tej Singh.

Singh is also commander-in-chief of the Bahujan Swayam Sewak Sanghathan, a militant dalit organization. BSS was founded 1995.

In the Lok Sabha elections 2004 ASP had launched nine candidates from Uttar Pradesh. Tej Singh stood as candidate from Aligarh and got 1 054 votes (0,17%).

== See also ==
- List of political parties in India
