= Ajay Singh =

Ajay Singh may refer to:

== People ==
- A. K. Singh (Ajay Kumar Singh, born 1953), Indian army officer and politician
- Ajay Singh (Karnataka politician) (born before 1992), Indian politician from the state of Karnataka
- Ajay Singh (diplomat) (1950–2020), high commissioner of India to Fiji
- Ajay Arjun Singh (active 2008), Indian politician from the state of the Madhya Pradesh
- Ajay Singh (footballer) (born 1989), Indian footballer
- Ajay Singh (weightlifter) (born 1997), Indian weightlifter
- Ajay Singh (entrepreneur) (active from 2005), owner of SpiceJet
- Ajay Singh Kilak, Indian minister co-operation in the Second Raje ministry
- Ajay Kumar Singh (disambiguation), various people
- Ajay Pratap Singh, Indian politician
- Ajay Raj Singh (born 1978), Indian sprinter

== Characters ==
- Ajay Singh Rajput, R&AW agent in the Indian films Baby (2015) and Naam Shabana (2017)
- Ajay Singh Rathod, fictional police officer portrayed by Aamir Khan in the Indian film Sarfarosh (1999)
