= Tej Singh (disambiguation) =

Tej Singh is a 19th-century Dogra commander in Sikh Empire.

Tej Singh may also refer to:

- Desingh, also known as Tej Singh, a king of the Bundela Rajput who ruled Gingee from 1712 to 1714
- Tej Singh Prabhakar (1911–2009), the last ruling Maharaja of Alwar
- Tej Singh (politician), Indian politician and founder president of Ambedkar Samaj Party
- Tej P. Singh (born 1944), an Indian biophysicist
- Tej Parkash Singh, Member of the Punjab Legislative Assembly (2002–2012)
- Tej Pratap Singh Yadav, Indian politician

== See also ==
- Teja Singh (disambiguation)
