= Ram Singh =

Ram Singh is an Indian name and may refer to:

- Ram Singh I (died 1688), Maharaja of Jaipur
- Ram Singh (1811–1889), Raja of Bundi
- Ram Singh II (1835–1880), Maharaja of Jaipur
- Ram Singh of Bharatpur (1873–1929), Maharaja of princely state Bharatpur
- Ram Singh of Sitamau (1880-1967), Raja of Sitamau
- Ram Singh of Dholpur (1883–1911), ruler of Dholpur
- Ram Singh of Marwar (1730–1772), Raja of Marwar Kingdom
- Ram Singh of Pratapgarh, ruler of Pratapgarh from 1929 to 1949
- Ram Singh (Fiji), early 20th-century Fiji Indian businessman
- Ram Singh (architect) (Bhai Ram Singh), Indian architect, active from 1870s
- Ram Singh (cricketer), Indian cricketer who played for Gwalior in 1940s
- Ram Singh (murderer), one of the rapists and murderers of the 2012 Delhi gang rape and murder
- Ram Singh (musician) (Ram Singh Thakuri), Indian musician
- Ram Singh (politician), Indian politician
- Ram Singh (Uttar Pradesh politician) (Ram Singh Patel), Indian politician from Uttar Pradesh
- Ram Singh, character in the British television series Class
- Colonel Ram Singh, character portrayed by Satish Shah in the 2006 film Fanaa
- Ram Badan Singh, Indian agricultural scientist
- Ram Bux Singh, Indian renewable energy scientist
- Ram Raja Prasad Singh (1936–2012), Nepalese politician

== See also ==
- Thakur Ram Singh (disambiguation)
- Ram Singh Kuka (1816–1885), Sikh religious leader
- Satguru Ram Singh (1816–1885), Indian spiritual leader
  - Satguru Ram Singh Marg metro station, Delhi, India
- Ram Singh Charlie, a 2020 Indian drama film
- Ramsinhji Rathod, Indian politician
- Ramsinh Rathwa, Indian politician
- Ramasimhan (born 1963), Indian film director
- Ramasimhadeva, king of the region of Mithila in India
