= Baljit Singh =

Baljit Singh may refer to:

- Dr Zeus (Baljit Singh Padam), Bhangra musician from the UK
- Baljit Singh Chadha, businessman from Canada
- Baljit Singh (cricketer, born 1977), Danish cricketer
- Baljit Singh (cricketer, born 1981)
- Baljit Singh (Italian cricketer), Italian cricketer
- Baljit Singh Dhillon, field hockey midfielder from India
- Baljit Singh (field hockey, born 1986), field hockey defender from Malaysia
- Baljit Singh (field hockey, born 1987), field hockey defender from Malaysia
- Baljit Singh Saini, field hockey defender and midfielder from India
