= Laxman Singh (disambiguation) =

Laxman Singh (1908 – 1989) was the last ruling Maharawal (Maharaja) of the Indian princely state of Dungarpur.

Laxman Singh is an Indian name may also refer to:

- Laxman Singh (conservationist)
- Laxman Singh (Madhya Pradesh politician)
- Lakshman Singh (golfer)
- Lakshman Singh (Scouting)

== See also ==
- Lakshman Singh (disambiguation)
