= Krishna Singh =

Krishna Singh may refer to:

- Krishna Singh Rawat, 19th-century Indian cartographer
- Krishna Singh (politician) (1867–1961), Indian politician from Bihar
- Krishna Pal Singh (1922–1999), Indian politician from Madhya Pradesh
- Chinmayanand (politician), born Krishna Pal Singh, Indian politician from Uttar Pradesh
- Hari Krishna Singh, Indian politician from Madhya Pradesh
- S. K. Singh (general), former Vice Chief of the Indian Army
