= Parmjit Singh (disambiguation) =

Parmjit Singh is an Indian name and may refer to:

- Parmjit Singh Gill, British Liberal Democrat politician
- Parmjit Singh Dhanda, British Labour Party politician
- Parmjit Singh "Peter" Sandu, Canadian politician
- Parmjit Singh, British lawyer

== See also ==
- Paramjit Singh (disambiguation)
