= Harkirat Singh =

Harkirat Singh is an Indian name. Notable people called Harkirat Singh includes

- Harkirat Singh Kalsi, Indian cyclist
- Harkirat Singh (general), retired Indian Army officer and one of the Commanding officers of the erstwhile Indian Peace Keeping Force in Sri Lanka
