= Zorawar Singh =

Zorawar Singh may refer to:

- Zorawar Singh (Dogra general), general of Raja Gulab Singh
- Zorawar Singh (Sikhism), third son of Guru Gobind Singh
- Kanwar Zorawar Singh, Indian Army general
- Zorawar Singh of Bikaner, Maharaja of Bikaner
