= Devendra Singh =

Devendra Singh may refer to:

- Devendra Singh (psychologist) (1938–2010), American psychologist
- Devendra Singh (politician) (born 1954), member of the Lok Sabha, the lower house of the Parliament of India, for Akbarpur, Uttar Pradesh (from 2014)
- Devendra Pal Singh (born 1975), Indian cricketer
- Devendra Pratap Singh (disambiguation)
  - Devendra Pratap Singh (UP politician, born 1954), member of the Uttar Pradesh Legislative Council for Gorakhpur-Faizabaad Graduates
  - Devendra Pratap Singh (UP politician, born 1958), member of the Uttar Pradesh Legislative Assembly for Sareni
  - Devendra Pratap Singh (Chhattisgarh politician) (born 1975)

== See also ==
- Davinder Singh (disambiguation)
- Davendra Singh (born 1950), Fiji Indian politician
- Davendra Singh (athlete) (born 1965), Fijian middle-distance runner
- Debindro Singh or Devendra Singh (died 1871), king of Manipur (1850)
- Devendro Singh (born 1992), Indian boxer
