= Surendra Singh =

Surendra Singh may refer to:

- Surendra Singh (1923–1996), last ruler of Alirajpur State, and Indian ambassador to Spain
- Surendra Singh (athlete) (born 1978), Indian long-distance runner
- Surendra Singh (Baghal State) (1909–1945), ruler of Baghal State 1922–1945
- Surendra Singh (cabinet secretary), Indian civil servant
- Surendra Kumar Singh (politician) (1932–2015), Indian politician and a scion of the princely state of Raigarh
- Surendra Narayan Singh, Indian politician representing Rohaniya, Varanasi district, in the Legislative Assembly of Uttar Pradesh
- Surendra Nath Singh (born 1962), Indian politician representing Bairia, Ballia district, in the Legislative Assembly of Uttar Pradesh
- Surendra Pratap Singh (1948–1997), Indian journalist

== Fictional ==
- Maharaja Surendra Singh, King of Naugarh, in the 1888 Indian novel Chandrakanta by Devaki Nandan Khatri and its 1994 TV adaptation

== See also ==
- Surinder Singh (disambiguation)
- Surendra Singh Baghel (b. 1977), politician in Madhya Pradesh
- Surendra Singh Bhoi, representative Titlagarh (Odisha Vidhan Sabha constituency) 2009-2014
- Surendra Singh Chauhan, representative Barauli, Uttar Pradesh (Vidhan Sabha constituency) 1974–1977, 1980-1991
- Surendra Singh Nagar, politician, Gautam Buddha Nagar constituency of Uttar Pradesh
- Surendra Singh Panwar (1919–2002), artillery officer, Indian Army, brigadier
- Surendra Singh Patel, politician, Sewapuri constituency seat in Varanasi, Uttar Pradesh
- Surendrasinhji Jorawarsinhji (1922–1983), namesake of the city Surendranagar Dudhrej in Gujarat, India
