= Karam Singh (disambiguation) =

Karam Singh (1915–1993) was a Sikh Indian military war hero.

Karam Singh may also refer to:

- Karam Singh, Pakistan, a town in the Islamabad Capital Territory of Pakistan
- Karam Singh (historian) (1884–1930), Sikh historian
