= Rahul Singh =

Rahul Singh may refer to:

- Rahul Singh (actor) (born 1966), Indian film actor
- Rahul Singh (comic book character), a character in the Shekhar Kapur's comic Devi
- Rahul Singh (cricketer, born 1992), Indian cricketer
- Rahul Singh (cricketer, born 1995), Indian cricketer
- Rahul Singh (cricketer, born 1997), Indian cricketer
- Rahul Singh (field hockey) (born 1975), Indian Olympic hockey player
- Rahul Singh (paramedic) (born 1970), Canadian paramedic and humanitarian

== See also ==
- Rahul (disambiguation)
- List of people with surname Singh
