= Sukhwinder Singh (disambiguation) =

Sukhwinder Singh is a playback singer.

Sukhwinder Singh may also refer to:

- Sukhwinder Singh (footballer, born 1979), Indian football goalkeeper
- Sukhwinder Singh (footballer, born 1983), Indian football midfielder
- Sukhwinder Singh (football manager) (born 1949), Indian footballer and manager
- Sukhwinder Singh (field hockey)
- Sukhvinder Singh (cricketer) (born 1967), Indian cricketer
- Sukhwinder Singh Bhatti (born 1950s), human rights activist
