= Teja Singh (disambiguation) =

Teja Singh was a Sikh scholar, teacher, author and translator.

Teja Singh may also refer to:

- Teja Singh Akarpuri, Jathedar of Akal Takht from 1921 to 1923 and 1926 to 1930
- Teja Singh Bhuchar, Jathedar of Akal Takht from 1920 to 1921
- Teja Singh Samundri, founder of Shiromani Gurdwara Prabandhak Committee
- Teja Singh Sutantar, freedom fighter and member of Ghadar Party
- Teja Singh (preacher), Sikh preacher and writer

== See also ==
- Tej Singh (disambiguation)
