= Jasjit Singh =

Jasjit Singh may refer to:

- Jasjit Singh (IAF officer) (1934–2013), Indian military officer, writer and military strategist
- Jasjit Singh (tennis) (born 1948), Indian Davis Cup tennis player
- Jasjit Singh Kular (born 1989), Indian field hockey player
