= Satya Pal Singh =

Satya Pal Singh or Satyapal Singh may refer to:

- Satya Pal Singh (Uttar Pradesh politician) (born 1955), India's Minister of State for Human Resource Development
- Satyapal Singh Sikarwar, Indian politician from Madhya Pradesh and member of the Indian National Congress.
- Satyapal Singh Saini (born 1973), Uttar Pradesh politician
- Satyapal Singh Yadav, minister of state in Government of India 1998-1999
- S. P. Singh Baghel (born 1960), Uttar Pradesh politician
- Satyapal Singh (athletics coach) (Indian athletics coach who specialises in para-athletics)
