= Navdeep Singh =

Navdeep Singh may refer to:

- Navdeep Singh (Ashok Chakra) (died 2011), Indian soldier who posthumously received the Ashok Chakra
- Navdeep Singh (cricketer) (born 1974), Indian cricketer and umpire
- Navdeep Singh (director) (born 1968), Indian director
- Navdeep Singh (lawyer), Indian lawyer, reserve army officer, and author
- Navdeep Singh (tennis) (born 1986), Indian tennis player
- Navdeep Singh (athlete) (born 2000), Indian Paralympian and javelin thrower
