= Sandeep Singh (disambiguation) =

Sandeep Singh (born 1986) is an Indian field hockey player.

Sandeep Singh may also refer to:

- Sandeep Singh (air marshal), Air Marshal of the Indian Air Force
- Sandeep Singh (cricketer, born 1981), Indian first-class cricketer
- Sandeep Singh (cricketer, born 1988) (1988–2014), Indian first-class cricketer
- Sandeep Singh (producer), Indian film producer
- Sandeep Singh (politician) (born 1991), Indian politician
- Sandeep Singh (footballer) (born 1995), Indian footballer
- Sandeep Singh (robbery victim), Indian worker and survivor of the 2010 Kallang slashings in Singapore
