= Manjeet Singh =

Manjeet Singh may refer to:

- Manjeet Singh (cricketer) (born 1991), Indian cricketer
- Manjeet Singh (rower) (born 1988), Indian rower
- Manjeet Singh Panesar, Indian-Kenyan field hockey player
- Manjeet Singh Ral (born 1985), known as Manj Musik, British-Indian singer, songwriter and music producer
- Manjeet Singh Riyat (died 2020), British emergency care consultant
- Manjeet Singh, a character created by YouTuber Lilly Singh as an exaggeration of her father

== See also ==
- Manjit Singh (disambiguation)
- Son of Manjeet Singh, a 2018 Indian film
