= Sher Singh (disambiguation) =

Sher Singh can refer to:

- Maharaja Sher Singh (1807-1843), Sikh ruler of the Punjab and the Sikh Empire
- Sher Singh Attariwalla, military commander of the Sikh Empire in the mid-19th century in Punjab
- T. Sher Singh (born 1949), Canadian lawyer
- Sher Singh Ghubaya (born 1962), Indian politician, member of the Lok Sabha
- Sher Singh Rana (21st century), Indian convicted assassin
