= Harpreet Singh =

Harpreet Singh may refer to:

- Harpreet Singh (sport shooter), Indian sport shooter
- Harpreet Singh (boxer) (born 1979), Indian boxer
- Harpreet Singh (carrom player), state carrom champion of Punjab, India
- Harpreet Singh (field hockey) (born 1973), Indian hockey player
- Harpreet Singh (footballer, born 2002), Indian football player
- Harpreet Singh (cricketer, born 1967), Indian cricketer

== See also ==
- Harpreet Singh Bhatia (born 1991), Indian cricketer
- Harpreet Singh Giani, Indian advocate and barrister
- Harpreet Singh Nehal (born 1966), Singaporean lawyer and politician
