= Baba Sewa Singh =

Indian social worker

- Born: 15-03-1960; Amritsar, Punjab, India
- Occupations: Social worker & Religious Leader
- Awards: Padma Shri

Baba Sewa Singh is an Indian social worker and environmentalist, involved in the restoration and maintenance of the historic Gurudwaras at Khadoor Sahib. Baba Sewa Singh is a recipient of the Guru Gobind Singh Foundation Sewa Award in 2004. The Government of India honored him in 2010, with the fourth highest civilian award of Padma Shri.

== As a Head of Kaar Sewa Khadur Sahib ==
Being Head of Kaar Sewa Khadur Sahib, Baba Sewa Singh is supervising construction and renovation of historical Sikh Gurdwaras in various parts of India.

== As an Environmentalist ==
- Campaign for tree plantation was started by him in 1999. So far more than 6.5 lac trees have been planted along the road sides as well as in the educational institutions, hospitals and other public places in Punjab, Rajasthan, Madhya Pradesh, Delhi and Mumbai.
- 550 Km roads and 500 villages have been covered in respect of tree plantation.
- In the year 2019, A goal of planting 550 small dense forests dedicated to the birth anniversary of the first Guru of Sikhs, Sri Guru Nanak Dev Ji, was set. 50 Kinds of tree are planted in the Guru Nanak Memorial Forests, namely four main types – Fruit bearing trees, Flower bearing trees, Shade giving and Medicinal trees. Total 231 Forests have been Planted So far.
- Trees like Neem, Jamun, Tulsi and other varieties of plants rich in oxygen and for good healthy environment are successfully planted.
- Traditional trees like Banyan and Peepal have been planted in the number of around 10000 so far. The group of Banyan, Peepal and Neem which is called “Triveni” has been planted in large number.
- A plant Nursery for the environmental projects has been established in Khadur sahib, which is always equipped with more than two lac saplings, which are nurtured and enriched with the best natural resources of the time.
- Concerned with the maintenance of ecological balance and the conservation of the environment and protect the environment from destruction or pollution.
- Encourages farmer for horticulture which is quite eco-friendly. For this purpose, various orchards have been established in Khadur Sahib which contain fruits of different types.
- Protect the air, water and land from pollution or its effects.
- The organisation is using Bags (Eco-Friendly bags) to reduce the use of Plastic Bags. These Bags are very helpful to carry daily need products. Bag Jutes are made up of Fabric extracted from the bark of the white jute plant.

== As an Educationist ==
- Specialisation in educational theory or administration and an expertise to employ the unemployed youth in various fields.
- Seven educational institutes are running under Kaar Sewa Kahdur Sahib – One post graduate degree College, one B.Ed. College, one CBSE school, two senior Secondary schools in Punjab, three in backward areas of Madhya Pradesh. more than 8000 students are studying in these institutions.

== Four more institutes run under his patronage through Nishan-E-Sikhi Charitable Trust (Regd.) Khadur Sahib ==
- Sri Guru Angad Dev Institute of Religious Studies is running to impart spiritual and cultural education. The institute makes arrangements of comparative study of different religions of the world for its students.
- One Institute of Competitions with the motive of providing opportunities to students to get admission in reputed medical and engineering colleges at affordable cost and for economically downtrodden students was established in 2009.
- Institute of Career and Courses imparts training to women aspirants for recruitment in defence and police services. The institute has so far placed 527 candidates in various police, military and paramilitary forces among which 11 are designated as Sub-Inspector in Punjab Police.
- Nishan-E-Sikhi Preparatory Institute prepares the candidates for National Defence Academy (NDA) examination conducted for direct officer entry in Indian Army. The institute has so far placed 14 candidates in Indian Armed Forces.

== As a sports promoter ==
The Baba Uttam Singh National Hockey Academy is a sports training institution dedicated to the development and promotion of field hockey. The academy fields teams across various youth age demographics, competing in and winning multiple district, state, and national tournaments.

Several academy alumni have transitioned to the India men's national field hockey team, including Akashdeep Singh, Varun Kumar, Talwinder Singh, and Mandeep Singh. Additionally, academy trainee Prabhjot Singh represents the India men's national under-21 field hockey team.

== Award and Recognitions ==
- The government of India awarded him with the prestigious Padma Shri for selfless service in the field of environment and social Empowerment in 2010.
- The then UN Secretary General Mr. Ban Ki Moon honoured him during Windsor celebrations in London in November 2009.
- Dr. APJ Abdul Kalam former president of India presented him Capital Foundation Justice Kuldip Singh Award in 2011.
- Chief Minister of Punjab conferred the State Award to him for social service during the 65th Independence Day function August 15, 2011 at Amritsar.
- Apart from these awards, various NGO’s have honoured him for his excellence in Environment protection, social service and education.
- On 4 December 2020 to support farmers protest he returned his Padma Shri Award.
