= Birender Singh =

Birender Singh may refer to:

- Birender Singh (politician, born 1921) (1921–2009), Indian politician
- Birender Singh (politician, born 1946), Indian politician
- Birender Singh Dhanoa, Indian air force officer
- Birender Singh Thapa, Indian boxer
