= Gagandeep Singh =

Gagandeep Singh may refer to:

- Gagandeep Singh (cricketer, born 1981), Indian cricketer
- Gagandeep Singh (cricketer, born 1987), Indian cricketer
- Gagandeep Singh (footballer) (born 1985), Indian footballer

== See also ==
- Gagandeep Singh Lally (born 1995), Norwegian footballer
