= Zorawar Singh of Bikaner =

Maharaja of Bikaner from 1735 to 1746

Zorawar Singh

Maharaja of Bikaner
- Reign: 16 December 1735 – 15 May 1746
- Predecessor: Sujan Singh
- Successor: Gaj Singh
- Born: 14 January 1713; Junagarh Fort, Bikaner
- Died: 15 May 1746 (aged 33); Anoopura Bikaner
- Spouse: Kachwahiji (Shekhawatji) Udai Kanwarji of Khandela in Jaipur; Bhatiyaniji (Derawarji) Abhai Kanwarji of Derawar in Jaisalmer; Tanwarji Umaid Kanwarji of Lakhasar in Bikaner
- House: Bikawat-Rathore
- Father: Sujan Singh
- Mother: Bhatiyaniji (Derawarji) Fateh Kanwarji granddaughter of Rawal Ramchandra of Jaisalmer

Maharaja Zorawar Singh (14 January 1713 – 15 May 1746) was the ruler of the Kingdom of Bikaner between 1735 and 1746. During this period, the Kingdom was a vassal state of the Mughal empire.

== Biography ==
Zorawar Singh was born in 1712. He was the son of his predecessor Sujan Singh.

=== As crown prince ===
In 1733, when the forces of Marwar invaded Bikaner, Yuvraj Zorawar Singhji was stationed at Nohar with about 22,000 men. He marched with his men in defense of the capital, and fought with the invading forces at Talao Najasar. The Marwar army, about 15,000 strong and led by Kunwar Bakht Singh, was defeated.

Subsequently, Zorawar Singji disputed with his father over Zorawar's dislike for a man named Khawas Anand Ramji. Maharaja Sujan Singhji had sought to humour the crown prince, but Zorawar Singh would not accept anything less than the killing of Anand Ram. Upon not being granted this, he left Bikaner to reside at Nohar. From there, he had dispatched assassins who murdered Anand Ram at night. He then moved with his force to Bikaner, encamping at a nearby village. Maharaja Sujan Singhji's advisers prompted him not to fight the crown prince, and therefore a reconciliation was arranged. Two queens of Sujan Singh met with Zorawar Singh, who agreed to pay homage to his father. His position and powers were reinstated by the Maharaja.

=== Reign ===
Zorawar was crowned in 1735, upon the death of his father. He began his reign by expelling Marwari troops who had occupied some stations on the border with Bikaner. He then ousted Sangram Singh, the Thakur of Churu from his position.

==== Siege of Bikaner ====
Maharaja Abhai Singh of Marwar invaded the Bikawat-Rathore territory of Bikaner .The capital was plundered, and the fort besieged. At the request of Zorawar Singh, Maharaja Sawai Jai Singh of Jaipur invaded Marwar. The siege of Bikaner was therefore raised and Maharaja Abhai Singh marched in haste towards his own kingdom, pursued by Bikaneri troops.

==== Occupation of Churu and Hissar ====
Subsequently, the Maharaja engaged himself in putting down rebels in his territory, with Jaipuri assistance. Churu was occupied, with the rebels expelled, and was later granted to the son of Sangram Singh. The last military campaign of Zorawar was to take back Hissar from the Bhatti and Johiya tribes who had held it. A force was sent under the prime minister to occupy Hansi, while Zorawar himself occupied Hissar.

=== Death and cremation ===
After the taking of Hissar, Zorawar was struck by an illness, and died four days later. It was also suspected that he might have been poisoned. He was cremated at Annupura. At his funeral, a large number of people were burned alive in accordance with the tradition of sati. These included two queens, one khawas (higher ranked concubines), eleven concubines, five slave-girls of the Maharaja, two slave-girls of the concubines, and one brahmin employed in the cooking department. The queens and one concubine burnt at Bikaner, with the Maharaja's turban. The rest burned at Annupura with the corpse.

== See it ==
- Maratha Empire
- Maratha Mandir

== Bibliography ==
- Sehgal, K. K. (1962). Rajasthan District Gazetteers: Bikaner. Jaipur: Bharat Printers.
- Powlett, P. W. (1874). Gazetteer of The Bikaner State.
- Goetz, Hermann (1950). Art and Architecture of Bikaner State. Bruno Cassirer.
