= Kunwar Singh (disambiguation) =

Kunwar Singh (1777–1858) was one of the leaders during the Indian Rebellion of 1857.

Kunwar Singh may also refer to:

- Awadhesh Pratap Singh (Kunwar Awadhesh Pratap Singh; 1888–1967), Indian independence activist, Chief Minister of Vindhya Pradesh (1948–1949)
- Brajesh Singh (Kunwar Brijesh Singh; died 1966), Indian communist politician
- Divye Pratap Singh (Kunwar Divye Pratap Singh; born 1996), Indian shooter
- K. B. Singh (Kunwar Bachint Singh), Fijian politician
- K. D. Singh (field hockey) (Kunwar Digvijay Singh, also known as Babu; 1922–1978), Indian field hockey player
- Kunwar Amar (Kunwar Amarjeet Singh; born 1985), Indian dancer and television actor
- Kunwar Indrajit Singh (1906–1982), Prime Minister of Nepal (1957)
- Kunwar Manvendra Singh (born 1947), member of the Lok Sabha, the lower house of the Parliament of India, for Mathura
- Kunwar Pranav Singh (politician) (born 1966), Member of the Uttarakhand Legislative Assembly
- Kunwar Sarvesh Kumar Singh, also known as Rakesh Singh (born 1952), Indian businessman and member of the Lok Sabha, the lower house of the Parliament of India, for Moradabad (from 2014)
- Kunwar Suresh Singh, older brother of Raja Awadhesh Singh, the ruler of Kalakankar
- Kunwar Sushant Singh (born 1988), Member of the Uttar Pradesh Legislative Assembly (from 2014)
- Kunwar Vikram Singh, also known as Nati Raja (born 1970), Member of the Madhya Pradesh Legislative Assembly (from 2003)
- R. P. N. Singh (Kunwar Ratanjit Pratap Narain Singh; born 1964), member of the Lok Sabha, the lower house of the Parliament of India, for Kushi Nagar (2009–2014)
- Rewati Raman Singh (Kunwar Rewati Raman Singh; born 1943), member of the Lok Sabha, the lower house of the Parliament of India, for Allahabad (2004–2014)
- Sarvraj Singh (Kunwar Sarvraj Singh; born 1952), member of the Lok Sabha, the lower house of the Parliament of India, for Aonla (1996–1998, 1999–2009)
