= Sukhdev Singh =

Sukhdev Singh may refer to:

- Sukhdev Singh Kang (1931–2012), former Kerala Governor and judge
- Sukhdev Singh Libra (born 1932), Indian Member of Parliament
- Sukhdev Singh Dhindsa (born 1936), former Indian Minister
- Sukhdev Singh Babbar (1955–1992), co-founder of Babbar Khalsa
- Sukhdev Singh Sukha (1962–1992), Khalistan Commando Force member
- Sukhdev Singh (footballer) (born 1991)

== See also ==
- Sukhdevsinhji (born 1936), businessman and first-class cricketer
