= Er Sanjeev Singh =

Indian politician

Er.Sanjeev Singh

Personal details
- Born: Muzaffarpur
- Party: Indian National Congress
- Profession: Politician, Educationist, Agriculturist

Er. Sanjeev Singh is a member of the Indian National Congress, Congress MLA candidate Vaishali Assembly, General Secretary & Spokesperson at Bihar Pradesh Congress Committee (BPCC) and Ex State President, Bihar Pradesh Youth Congress (BPYC).

== Early life ==
Sanjeev Singh was born to Dr. Mahanand Singh and Smt. Mridula Rani Singh in Muzaffarpur, Bihar. Er. Sanjeev Singh's father is a famous doctor of North Bihar.

Er. Sanjeev Singh's primary education was at Muzaffarpur. He studied at Kendriya Vidyalaya and completed his class 10th and joined Langat Singh College Muzaffarpur, Prestigious College of North Bihar for his intermediate education. He got 1st Rank in Bihar Combined Engineering Entrance Exam and become "State Topper" in BCEE Exam 1996 & studied B.E. (Electronics Engg) at India's best REC National Institute of Technology, Jamshedpur.

He was student union president of RIT Jamshedpur from 1998 to 2000. He has completed M.B.A from XLRI (Xavier Labour Research Institute) Jamshedpur and got selected for Cisco Systems and worked for Cisco Systems Bangalore for four years. He completed his M.Tech from PTU.

== Political career ==
- Indian National Congress Assembly Candidate from Vaishali Assembly Constituency in 2020 Bihar Election.
- General Secretary, Bihar Pradesh Congress Committee (2015 onwards)
- Spokesperson, Bihar Pradesh Congress Committee (2016 onwards)
- Chairman, Social Media & IT Cell Bihar Pradesh Congress Committee (2016 onwards)
- State President, Bihar Pradesh Youth Congress (2012–2013)
- Member, Food Corporation of India Consultative Committee (2012)
- Member, Film & Censor Board (2012)
- Member, Indian Railways ZRUCC, E.C.R. (2012)
- Contested 2010, MLA election from Bikram assembly Constituency
- State General Secretary, Bihar Pradesh Youth Congress (2010)
- Secretary, Sri Balaji Educational Research & Development Trust
- President, Lord Buddha Educational Research & Development Trust
