= Kanwar Dinesh Singh =

Indian writer (born 1973)

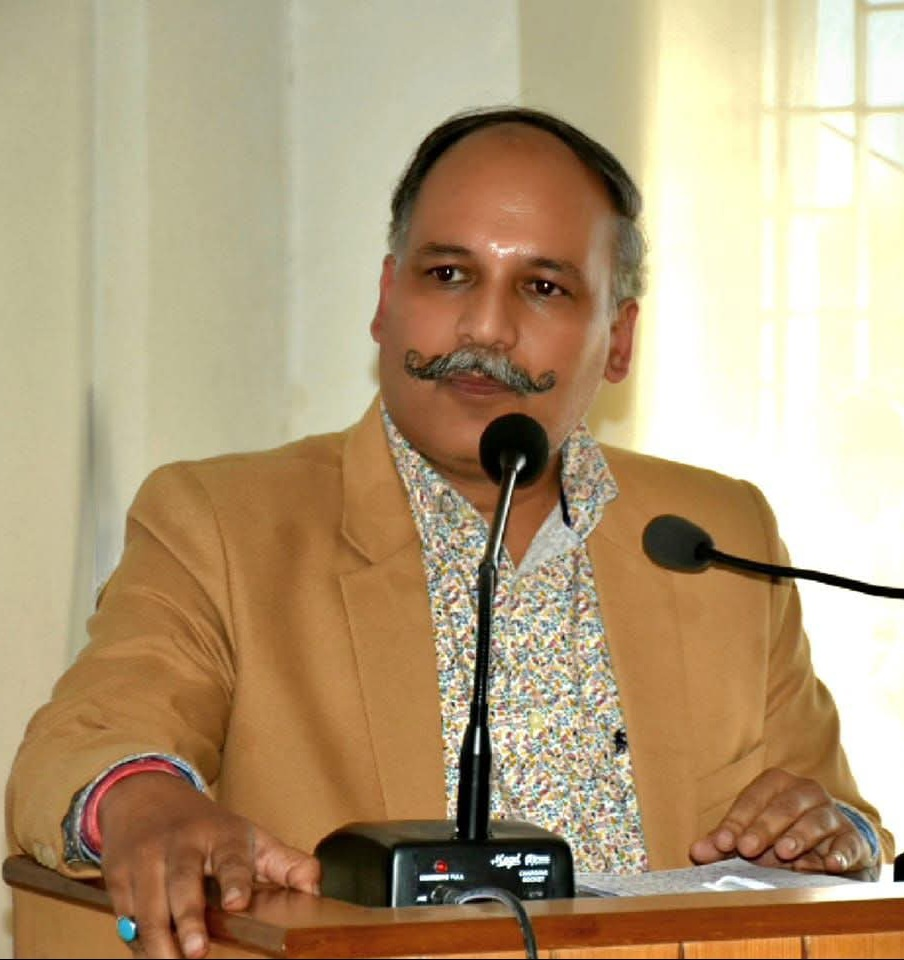
- Born: June 10, 1973; New Delhi, India
- Education: Himachal Pradesh University
- Occupations: Writer, poet, haikuist
- Writing career
- Genres: Poetry, haiku, short fiction
- Notable awards: Himachal Sahitya Akademi Award

Kanwar Dinesh Singh (born 10 June 1973; also known as Kunwar Dinesh) is an Indian writer, poet, haikuist, and translator in English and Hindi from Shimla, Himachal Pradesh. In 2002, he was awarded the Himachal Sahitya Akademi Award for his English poetry.

== Early life and education ==
Singh was born in New Delhi and was brought up and educated in Shimla, Himachal Pradesh. Singh was influenced by the landscape and folklore of the region. His literary works, particularly his poetry, are influenced by this cultural context. Singh's early life was marked by a passion for literature and the arts, which led him to pursue a doctorate in English literature.

His academic career was influenced by his interest in Hindi and English literature, which laid the foundation for his writing career. While living in Shimla, he gained appreciation for the stories and traditions of the mountainous region.

Singh is a professor of English and principal of a government college in Shimla.

== Works ==
English poetry

- Implosions (1996)
- Asides (1996)
- Thinking Aloud (1999)
- The Theophany (1999)
- House Arrest (2000)
- Deuce: Haiku Poems (2001), with Patricia Prime
- The Flow of Soul (2002)
- Prospect Hill (2010)
- The Frosted Glass: Poems and Ghazals (2017)
- Epistles: Poems of Love and Longing (2018)
- Thoroughfare (2022)
- The March of Moths (2023)

Hindi poetry

- Put-bhed (2003)
- Kuhra Dhanush (2006)
- Aangan Mein Gauraiya (2013)
- Jag Raha Jugnoo (2018)
- Aalok ke Kshanon Mein (2023)

Hindi short fiction

- Jab Tak Zinda Hain (2020)

Edited work

- Dairon Se Pare (2022)
- Jewels of Serendipity (2025)

Translated work

- Beyond Semblances: English Renderings of Hindi Laghukathas (2021)
- Flame of the Forest: Hindi Haiku in English Translation (2020)

== Awards ==
- Himachal Sahitya Akademi Award.
- Mahavir Prasad Dwivedi Samman.
