= Thakur Ram Singh (disambiguation) =

Thakur Ram Singh may refer to:

- Thakur Ram Singh (1915–2009) Rashtriya Swayamsevak Sangh pracharak and founder of Akhil Bharatiya Itihas Sankalan Yojana
- Thakur Ram Singh (revolutionary) (1911–2009), Indian communist revolutionary and associate of Bhagat Singh
- Ram Singh Thakuri (1914–2002), Indian Gorkha freedom fighter

== See also ==
- S. G. Thakur Singh (1899–1976), Indian artist
- Thakur Vishva Narain Singh (1928–2009), Indian journalist and Braille editor
