= Anurag Singh (cricketer, born 1990) =

Indian cricketer (born 1990)

Personal information
- Full name: Anurag Pradeep Singh
- Born: 10 October 1990 (age 36); Rewa, Madhya Pradesh, India
- Batting: Right-handed
- Bowling: Left-arm medium

Domestic team information
- Years: Team
- 2013–2015: Madhya Pradesh
- First-class debut: 14 December 2013 Madhya Pradesh v Saurashtra
- List A debut: 15 February 2013 Madhya Pradesh v Uttar Pradesh

Career statistics
Competition	FC	LA	T20
Matches	2	2	4
Runs scored	16	0	0
Batting average	8.00	–	–
100s/50s	0/0	0/0	0/0
Top score	11*	–	0*
Balls bowled	216	106	72
Wickets	1	4	5
Bowling average	128.00	22.25	15.20
5 wickets in innings	0	–	–
10 wickets in match	0	0	–
Best bowling	1/24	3/41	3/8
Catches/stumpings	–/–	–/–	2/–
- Source: ESPNcricinfo, 24 February 2021

Anurag Singh (born 10 October 1990) is an Indian cricketer who played for Madhya Pradesh at the Indian domestic level between 2013 and 2015. A right handed batsman and a left-arm medium pace bowler, Singh made his List A debut in February 2013 against Uttar Pradesh. Later that year, in December, he made his first class debut against Saurashtra in Indore. He did not play either List A or First Class cricket after 2013, but did make three appearances in domestic T20s in April 2015.
