= Udham Singh (disambiguation) =

Udham Singh (1899–1940) was an Indian revolutionary.

Udham Singh may also refer to:

- Udham Singh (field hockey) (1928–2000), Indian Olympic field hockey player
- Udham Singh (Chhattisgarh Maoist) (died 2013), Indian Maoist militant
- Shaheed Udham Singh (film), a 1999 Indian film about the revolutionary
- Sardar Udham, a 2021 Indian film about the revolutionary
