= Gyani Kartar Singh Komal =

Kartar Singh Komal (1913 - 1992) was a writer and educationalist from Kashmir.

Kamal was born in 1913 at Fujipur (Srinagar). He passed his Matric and Gyani examinations and adopted the career of teaching. During his job as teacher in Khalsa School he was closely associated with the Shiromani Khalsa Darbar and Kashmir Central Sikh League.

He participated in the freedom struggle and was gaoled several times. He founded and edited a fortnightly Urdu paper titled "Karam Veer". He was also the editor of "Shamsheer". He wrote several books, viz. Dharam Dhwaj (1936), Komal Hularey (1958), Samaj Sudhar Bare Anmol Gurmat Vichar (1982).

Komal was instrumental in the enactment of the Kashmir Gurdwaras Act, for which he, along with other leaders of the Sikhs, struggled very hard. Komal was a dedicated and unassuming social worker. Until the age of 79 years he served the Kashmiri Sikhs. He died in 1992.

The Komal Library in Srinagar is named after him.

== Publications ==
- Stories from Sikh History
- Life of Guru Gobind Singh: A biography
- Rekindling of the Sikh heart
