= Anil C. Singh =

Indian lawyer

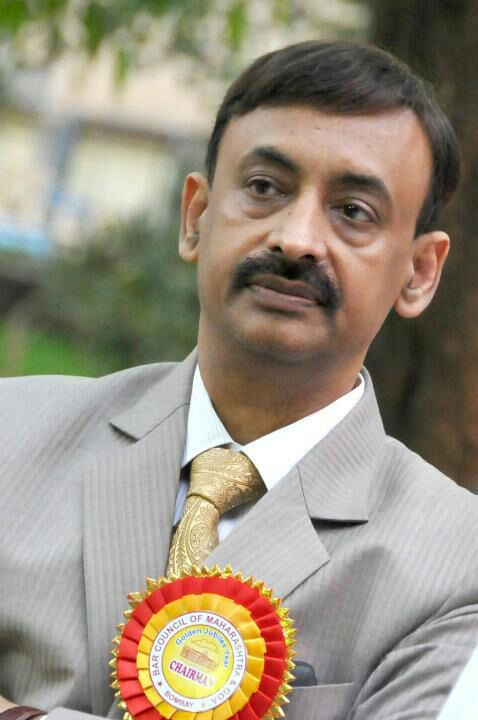
Anil C Singh

Anil C. Singh is an Indian lawyer designated as a senior advocate by the High Court of Bombay. He is currently serving as an Additional Solicitor General of India.

== Career as a lawyer ==
In 2003, Singh was appointed as senior counsel by Central Government to conduct cases in the Bombay High Court for Union of India and also appointed as special counsel to conduct cases for Brihanmumbai Municipal Corporation.

In 2010, Singh was elected as a member of the Bar Council of Maharashtra and Goa, by securing the highest votes in Mumbai. In 2011, Singh was unanimously elected as the chairman of the Bar Council of Maharashtra and Goa. In 2012, Singh was designated as senior advocate by Hon'ble Bombay High Court.

In 2020, he has been re-appointed for the third time in a row by an appointment committee of the cabinet headed by the prime minister of India. He served as an Additional Solicitor General of India till June 2024. In March 2025, Mr. Singh was, for the fourth time, appointed as an Additional Solicitor General of India for the High Court of Bombay for a period of three years with effect from 10.03.2025 or until further orders, whichever is earlier.
