= Parmjit Singh =

British lawyer

- Occupation: Lawyer
- Years active: 1987–present
- Title: Partner, head of Food and Drink Sector and head of India Business Group Eversheds LLP
- Term: 1997–present
- Successor: Incumbent

Parmjit Singh is a British solicitor, a partner at the international firm Eversheds LLP. Singh joined Eversheds as a trainee in 1987 and became a partner in 1997. He is head of Eversheds' Food and Drink Sector and head of India Business Group.

Singh is a member of the UK India Business Council, The City UK India Group, the Food and Drink Federation and the Food Law Group. He was recommended as a leading lawyer in real estate by Chambers Guide to the Legal Profession and Legal 500.
