= Mr. Nobodydudy =

Indian vlogger

Navjot Singh, also known as Mr. Nobodydudy, is an Indian vlogger, content creator, and comedian based in the Philippines. He is known for his comedic reaction videos, featuring Indian street food vendors cooking colorful and flavorful cuisines. Singh is also popular for his viral catchphrases, including "Mekus Mekus" (or "Mix Mix").

The phrase "Mekus Mekus" has become one of the most popular expressions in the Philippines, especially on TikTok. Despite his fame, Singh revealed that he has been receiving death threats from some Indians living in the Philippines, making him feel unsafe and reluctant to leave his home.
