= Baljit Singh (Indian cricketer) =

Indian cricketer (born 1981)

Baljit Singh (born 18 May 1981 in Sambalpur) is an Indian retired cricketer, a right-handed batsman and leg-break bowler who played for Odisha. He played for the Under-16, Under-19 and Under-22 teams between 1996 and 2000, and made a first-class appearance for Odisha during the 1996–97 season against Maharashtra. From the tailend, he scored a single run in the only inning he batted and took three wickets, including Hrishikesh Kanitkar's.
