= Harkirat Singh Kalsi =

Indian cyclist

Harkirat Singh Kalsi हरकीरत सिंह कालसी
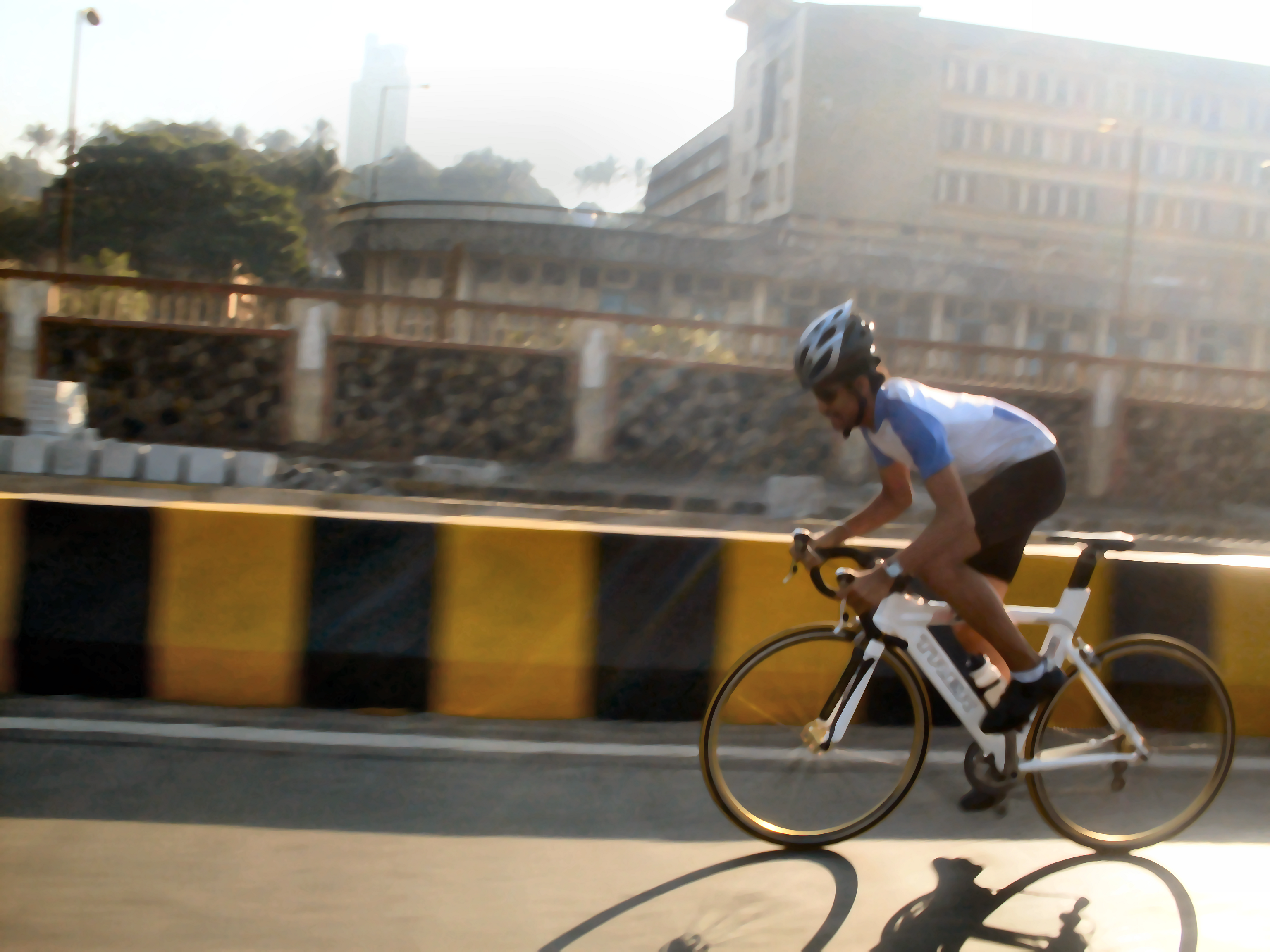
- Harkirat Singh cycling in the Maharashtra state Championship

Personal information
- Full name: Harkirat Singh Kalsi
- Born: 13 July 1994 (age 32) Manipur, India

Cycling career
- Sport: Cycling
- Current team: Maharashtra
- Discipline: Road
- Role: Rider
- Rider type: All-Rounder

Harkirat Singh Kalsi, born on 13 July 1994, is an Indian professional road racing cyclist who rides for the Mahashtra Cycling Team (U-15) . Ranked fifth in the country, he won the Maharashtra state Championship '09 under the Amateur Cycling Association of Bombay Suburban District in the boys under 16.
