= Swarup Singh =

Swarup Singh or Swaroop Singh may refer to:

- Swarup Singh Karki, Dewan (Prime Minister) of Kingdom of Nepal
- Swarup Singh of Jind (1812–1864), Sikh Raja of Jind of the Phulkian dynasty who reigned from 1834 to 1864
- Swarup Singh of Gingee, the fort commander of Gingee Fort from 1700 until his death in 1714
- Swarup Singh of Udaipur (1815–1861), the Maharana of Udaipur State
- Sarup Singh (1917–2003), also known as Swaroop Singh, an Indian academic turned politician
- Sarup Singh (Haryana Vidhan Sabha Speaker) (1919–2009), former Haryana Vidhan Sabha speaker
- Ram Swaroop Singh, an Indian politician and a former member of Uttar Pradesh Legislative Assembly
