= Shakti Singh =

Shakti Singh may refer to:

- Shakti Singh (16th century Indian noble), son of Maharana Udai Singh II Sisodia and Rani Sajja Bai Solankini
- Shakti Singh (athlete) (born 1962), Indian track and field athlete
- Shakti Singh (actor) (born 1955), Indian actor and voice actor
- Shakti Singh (cricketer) (born 1968), Indian first-class cricketer turned playback singer
