= Anil Singh (javelin thrower) =

Indian javelin thrower

Personal information
- Full name: Anil Kumar Singh
- Nationality: Indian
- Born: 4 March 1985 (age 41) Bhiwani, Haryana, India

Sport
- Country: India
- Sport: Track and field
- Event: Javelin throw
- Team: Indian Railways

Achievements and titles
- Personal bests: Outdoor: 80.72 m NR (Bhopal 2008)
- Updated on 20 September 2009

Anil Kumar Singh (born 4 March 1985) is an Indian track and field athlete from Haryana who specializes in javelin throw. He is the first Indian athlete to breach the 80-metre barrier in a competition. Anil Singh holds the current Indian National record of 80.72 metre set at the Asian All Stars athletics championships held in Bhopal on 18 September 2008. He replaced Satbir Singh's decade-old record of 79.68 metres, registered in Kolkata in October 1998.
