= Daljit Singh =

Daljit Singh may refer to:

- Daljit Singh (footballer) (born 1979), Indian footballer
- Daljit Singh (Delhi politician), Indian politician
- Daljit Singh (politician, born 1882), Indian Sikh politician
- Daljit Singh (cricketer, born 1935) (1935–2009), Indian cricketer
- Daljit Singh (cricketer, born 1937), Indian cricketer
- Daljit Singh (cricketer, born 1940s), Indian cricketer and pitch curator
- Daljeet Singh (born 1995), Hong Kong cricketer
- Daljit Singh (ophthalmologist) (1934–2017), Indian ophthalmologist
- Rai Daljit Singh (around 1798), Ruler of Bhadri (estate)
