= Baba Kashmira Singh =

Baba Kashmira Singh is head of the Sidhant Sant Samaj or Gurbani (Gurmati) Sidhant Pracharak Sant Samaj, a pro-Gurmat organization in Jalandhar, India. Formed in January, 1999, the organization rose to demand the removal of the controversial Gurcharan Singh Tohra from the Sant Samaj.

Prior to Baba Kashmira Singh's emergence as a religious figure, he served as a police official. His behavior as a religious leader, such as the promotion of the unity of religions, has sometimes created controversy among the Sikh community; in 1999, he was called before the collective body of Akal Takht to defend his allegedly "'heretical' activities". In an interview, Baba Kashmira Singh declared, "I believe a religion should be flexible and change with the times." He Started Initiating Satsang From Guru Granth Sahib Ji & Other Holy Books From 1 January 1982 Till Now By The Blessing Of His Satguru Swami Gurbachan Lal Ji Maharaj He is the founder of SGL Charitable Hospital in Jalandhar, a non-profit, acute care hospital with 500 beds, part of the Jan Sewa Trust he runs. He is also known for his work on various issues, such as establishing an eye bank, anti-drug addiction campaigns, breast/uterus cancer eradication, old age housing, and anti-dowry drive and nation soul refund.
