= Harpal Singh (disambiguation) =

Harpal Singh (born 1981) is an English footballer.

Harpal Singh may also refer to:

- Harpal Singh (field hockey) (born 1983), Indian Olympic field hockey player
- Harpal Singh Panwar (born 1945), Indian politician from Indian National Congress
- Harpal Singh Sathi (born 1942), Indian politician from Bharatiya Janata Party
- Harpal Singh Sokhi, Indian chef
