= Saurabh Singh =

Saurabh Singh may refer to:

- Saurabh Singh (cricketer) (born 1997), Indian cricketer
- Saurabh Singh (Chhattisgarh politician) (born 1974), Indian politician, member of Legislative Assembly for Akaltara
- Saurabh Singh (Uttar Pradesh politician), Indian politician, member of 17th Legislative Assembly, Uttar Pradesh
