= Amritpal Singh (disambiguation) =

Amritpal Singh (born 1993) is an Indian Sikh leader of Waris Panjab De.

Amritpal Singh may also refer to:

- Amritpal Singh (basketball) (born 1991), Indian basketball player
- Amritpal Singh (footballer) (born 2001), Indian professional footballer who plays as a defender
- Amritpal Singh (long jumper) (born 1983), Indian track and field athlete
- Amritpal Singh Dhillon (born 1993), Indian-Canadian singer and rapper
- Amritpal Singh Sukhanand, Indian politician
- Amritpal Singh, Indian stuntman and actor, notable for his role as the Swordfish Man in Krrish 3 (2013), and for appearing in Sooryavanshi (2021)
