= Devendra Pal Singh =

Indian cricketer (born 1975)

Personal information
- Full name: Devendra Pal Singh
- Born: 7 August 1975 (age 51); Udaipur, India
- Batting: Left-handed
- Source: ESPNcricinfo, 30 November 2016

Devendra Pal Singh (born 7 August 1975) is an Indian first-class cricketer who represented Rajasthan. He made his first-class debut for Rajasthan in the 1993–94 Ranji Trophy on 12 February 1994.
