= Gurpreet Singh =

Gurpreet Singh may refer to:

- Gurpreet Singh (racewalker)
- Gurpreet Singh (sport shooter) (born 1987), Indian sports shooter
- Gurpreet Singh (actor) (born 1978), Indian actor
- Gurpreet Singh (artist) (born 1976), Indian painter
- Gurpreet Singh (kabaddi) (born 1979), Indian kabaddi player
- Gurpreet Singh (professor), Indian-born US professor of mechanical and nuclear engineering
- Gurpreet Singh Kangar Punjab MLA 2017-22
- Gurpreet Singh Lehal (born 1963), professor in the Computer Science Department, Punjabi University
- Gurpreet Singh Sandhu (born 1992), Indian footballer who currently plays for Bengaluru FC in the Indian Super League
