= Paramjit Singh =

Paramjit Singh may refer to:

- Paramjit Singh (artist) (born 1935), Indian artist
- Paramjit Singh (basketball) (born 1952), Indian basketball player
- Paramjit Singh (sprinter) (born 1971), Indian athlete
- Paramjit Singh, titular successor to Jagatjit Singh (1872–1949) as Maharajah of Kapurthala
- Paramjit Singh Pamma, Indian Khalistan Tiger Force militant
- Paramjit Singh Panjwar (1960-2023), Indian Sikh militant, leader of the Khalistan Commando Force

== See also ==
- Parmjit Singh (disambiguation)
