= Dalip Singh =

Dalip Singh may refer to:

- Dalip Singh (athlete), first Sikh to represent India in the Olympics
- Dalip Singh (gymnastics coach), from Haryana, India
- Duleep Singh, last Maharaja of Sikh Empire
- Dalip Singh Rana, real name of actor and wrestler The Great Khali
- Dalip Singh Saund, American politician
- Daleep Singh, American economic and national security advisor
