= Harmeet Singh =

Harmeet Singh may refer to:

- Harmeet Singh (footballer) (born 1990), Norwegian international footballer of Indian descent who plays for Kalmar FF
- Harmeet Singh Bansal, Indian cricketer, playing for Punjab cricket team and Kings XI Punjab
- Harmeet Singh (militant), 8th Chief of Khalistan Liberation Force, a separatist organization in India
- Harmeet Singh (American cricketer), Indian-born American cricketer, played for India Under-19 cricket team and Rajasthan Royals. Currently playing for United States national cricket team.
- Harmeet Singh Sooden, Canadian and New Zealand citizen who volunteered for Christian Peacemaker Teams in Iraq
