= S. K. Singh =

S. K. Singh may refer to:

- Shilendra Kumar Singh (1932–2009), an Indian diplomat
- S. K. Singh (general) (born 1954), an Indian Army officer

== See also ==
- K. S. Singh, Indian anthropologist
