= Ramandeep Singh =

Ramandeep Singh may refer to:

- Ramandeep Singh (cricketer) (born 1997), Indian cricketer
- Ramandeep Singh (field hockey, born 1971)
- Ramandeep Singh (field hockey, born 1993)
- Ramandeep Singh (footballer)
- Ramandeep Singh (medical scientist), Indian medical scientist
