= Jitendra Singh (disambiguation) =

Jitendra Singh (born 1956) is an Indian physician and politician.

Jitendra Singh may also refer to:

== Politicians ==
- Jitendra Singh (Rajasthan politician) (born 1946), Indian National Congress politician
- Jitendra Singh (Uttar Pradesh politician) or Jitendra Kumar Bablu Bhaiya, Bahujan Samaj Party politician
- Jitendra Pal Singh Billu, Indian politician
- Bhanwar Jitendra Singh (born 1971), Indian politician from the Indian National Congress

== Others ==
- Jitendra Singh (cricketer) (born 1965), Indian cricketer
- Jitendra Singh (footballer) (born 2001), Indian footballer
- Jitendra Kumar Singh (born 1952), Indian oncologist
- Jitendra Pal Singh Uberoi or J. P. S. Uberoi (1934–2024), Indian sociologist and anthropologist

== See also ==
- Jitendra, an Indian male given name
- Singh, an Indian surname
- Jeetendra Singh Bundela, Indian politician
- Jitendra Singh Jadaun or Jeetu Verma (born 1967), Indian actor
