= Gajendra Singh =

Gajendra Singh may refer to:

- Gajendra Singh (producer), Indian television producer and director
- Gajendra Singh Khimsar (born 1957), MLA from Lohawat Rajasthan
- Gajendra Singh (cricketer) (born 1988), Indian first-class cricketer who plays for Rajasthan
- Gajendra Singh Shaktawat (born 1943), former Indian cricketer
- Gajendra Singh (politician) (born 1975), Indian politician and a member of the 16th Legislative Assembly of Uttar Pradesh, in India
- Gajendra Singh Rajukhedi is an Indian politician (born 1964), belonging to Indian National Congress
- Gajendra Narayan Singh (1925–2002), Nepali politician and Madhesi activist
- Gajendra Narayan Singh (musicologist), Indian musician, writer, and art historian
