= Hukam Singh =

Hukam Singh may refer to:

- Hukam Singh (Haryana politician) (1925–2015) also known as Chaudhari Hukam Singh
- Hukam Singh (Punjab politician) (1895–1983) also known as Sardar Hukam Singh
- Hukam Singh (Rajasthan politician) (1927–2024), Indian politician

== See also ==
- Hakam Singh (died 2018), Indian race walker
- Hukum Singh (1938–2018), Indian politician
- Rao Raja Hukum Singh Rathore (1951–1984), son of Maharaja Hanwant Singh, also known as Tutu Bana
