= Rabinder Singh =

Rabinder Singh may refer to:

- Rabinder Singh (intelligence officer), former officer in India's intelligence agency suspected of being a CIA mole
- Rabinder Singh (judge), English High Court of Justice Judge
