= Lakshman Singh =

Lakshman Singh is the name of:

- Lakshman Singh (golfer) (born c.1952), Indian golfer
- Lakshman Singh (politician) (born 1955), Indian politician
- Lakshman Singh (Scouting) (1911-1994), Indian leader in the Scouting movement

== See also ==
- Laxman Singh (disambiguation)
