= Tarlok Singh =

Tarlok Singh may refer to:

- Tarlok Singh (economist) (died 2005), Indian economist who served the Government of India during the period of Jawaharlal Nehru
- Tarlok Singh (athlete), Indian athlete, winner of the 1962 Arjuna Award
- Tarlok Singh Sandhu (born 1955), Indian Olympic basketball player
