= Kartar Singh (Sikh musician) =

Padma Shri Kartar Singh
- Born: 3 April 1928; Ghummanke village, Lahore district, Pakistan
- Died: 2 January 2022 (aged 93)
- Occupation: Gurmat Sangeet singer
- Awards: Padma Shri (2021); Sangeet Natak Akademi Award (2008)

Kartar Singh (3 April 1928 – 2 January 2022) was a gurmat sangeet singer. He received the Sangeet Natak Akademi Award in 2008 and Padma Shri in 2021.

== Early life ==
Singh was born in Ghummanke village, Lahore district, Pakistan. He completed his undergraduate and postgraduate studies (vocal and instrumental) at Panjab University, Chandigarh. In 2006, he restarted Gurbani Kirtan in ragas at Golden Temple, Amritsar. He had two sons and two daughters. He performed in New Delhi during the 2010 Commonwealth Games.

== Death ==
Singh died on 2 January 2022.

== Awards and honours ==
Singh was award with Sangeet Natak Akademi award in 2008. He received Padma Shri in Arts (2021). He could not attend the Padma Shri ceremony because of health issues. The Deputy Commissioner of Ludhiana presented the award to him in hospital.
