= Tej Singh (politician) =

Indian politician

President of Ambedkar Samaj Party

Personal details
- Party: Ambedkar Samaj Party
- Other political affiliations: Bahujan Swemsewak Sangthan (Commander)
- Occupation: Politician
- Known for: Founder of Ambedkar Samaj Party; Commander of Bahujan Swemsewak Sangthan

Tej Singh is an Indian politician who is the founder and president of Ambedkar Samaj Party. He is also commander of "Bahujan Swemsewak Sangthan".
