= Hardeep Singh =

Hardeep Singh may refer to:

- Hardeep Singh (field hockey), Indian field hockey player
- Hardeep Singh (cricketer, born 1981), Indian cricketer
- Hardeep Singh (cricketer, born 1995), Indian cricketer
- Hardeep Singh (wrestler), Indian wrestler
- Hardeep Singh Dang, Indian politician
- Hardeep Singh Kohli, British writer and broadcaster
- Hardeep Singh Nijjar, Canadian activist
- Hardeep Singh Puri, Indian Minister of Petroleum and Natural Gas and Minister of Housing and Urban Affairs
