= Mohan Singh (disambiguation) =

Mohan Singh (1945–2013) was an Indian politician from the Samajwadi Party..

Mohan Singh may also refer to:

- General Mohan Singh (1909–1989), Indian military officer and first leader of the Indian National Army during World War II
- Mohan Singh (poet) (1905–1978), Indian poet
- Mohan Singh Oberoi (1900–2002), Indian hotelier, founder Oberoi Group
