= Robin Singh =

Robin Singh may refer to:

- Robin Singh (cricketer) (born 1963), Indian cricketer
- Robin Singh Jr. (born 1970), Indian cricketer
- Robin Singh (footballer) (born 1990), Indian footballer
- Robin Singh, co-founder of Peepal Farm
