= Murder of Harshandeep Singh =

Indian college student murdered in Edmonton, Canada

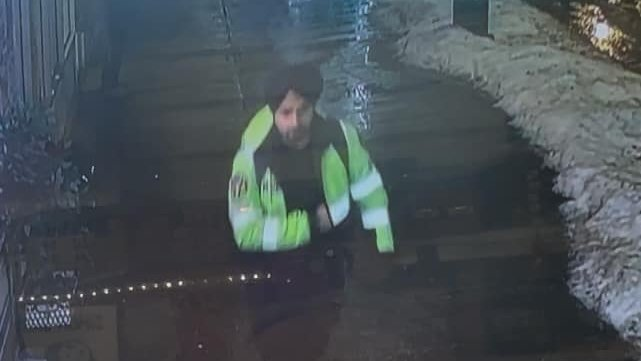
- Singh shortly before his murder
- Location: Edmonton, Alberta, Canada
- Date: 6 December 2024; 1:28 a.m.
- Attack type: Shooting
- Weapon: Sawed-off shotgun
- Deaths: Harshandeep Singh
- Perpetrators: Evan Rain and Judith Saulteaux
- Motive: Unknown
- Charges: First-degree murder

Harshandeep Singh Anttal (2004 — 6 December 2024) was an Indian Sikh student at NorQuest College, who was shot and killed at an apartment complex he was working at in December 2024.

== Background ==
Harshandeep Singh Anttal was born in 2004 to a Punjabi Sikh family of farmers in the village of Matehri Jattan, Haryana State, India. Singh was also reportedly an avid fan of video games.

In mid-2023 Singh began to attend NorQuest College studying business administration, using a student visa. On 3 December 2024, he began working as a security guard at an apartment complex at 10603, 107 Avenue and 106 Street, in the Central McDougall neighborhood.

Singh wanted to become a police officer for the Edmonton Police Service, and was in the process of attempting to join.

=== Perpetrators ===
Lazarus Evan Chase Francis Rain (born January 1994) who is of Indigenous Canadian descent, being a part of the Paul Band, he has an extensive criminal record dating back to 2012, having been charged with at least 80 crimes and has been convicted at least 17 times. He has been convicted for assault, unlawful possession of a firearm, drug possession, kidnapping, theft and reckless endangerment. In one incident in 2019, Rain engaged in a high speed chase with police while in the possession of a sawed-off shotgun and methamphetamine, while in prison he attacked several other prisoners, he also was once charged with kidnapping and car theft as well, he was sentenced to just under three years in prison.

Judith May Saulteaux (born 1994) who is also of Indigenous descent, has an extensive criminal record as well dating back to 2013. Saulteaux has been convicted at least eight times, having been charged with aggravated assault, possession of a firearm and shoplifting. In 2015 Saulteaux was sentenced to five years in prison for aggravated assault.

=== Previous events ===
In April 2023 the Alberta Health Services listed several problems in 32 of the units.

On 21 November 2024 at 5:54 a.m. a man was shot and wounded at the same apartment complex that Singh worked at.

Due to the frequent crime in and around the apartment complex the building's owner Van Vuong put it up for sale.

== Murder ==
CCTV footage of Harshandeep Singh's murder

On 6 December 2024, Singh who was patrolling the complex by himself, was approached by Evan Rain and Judith Saulteaux who began to harass him, Rain at some point got enraged and grabbed a sawed-off shotgun. At 1:28 a.m. he approached Singh again and hit him several times in the head with the barrel of the shotgun, they then forced him into the stairwell where Saulteaux threw him down the stairs, and Rain then shot him in the back. First responders discovered Singh unconscious but alive they attempted to resuscitate him in the lobby but when they were unable to they took him to the hospital, however he ended up dying around 10 minutes later.

== Aftermath ==
Rain and Saulteaux were arrested the same day and were both charged with first degree murder on 11 December, their next court appearance was scheduled for 8 January 2025. Rain was then scheduled to go to court for a plea on 22 January.

Singh's killing also highlighted problems with the safety of security guards as they are often patrolling by themselves and unarmed.

On 8 December a cousin of Singh, Gulzar Singh Nirman started a GoFundMe with its goal at $50,000 CAD, and in less than 24 hours the fundraiser raised $122,720 CAD. The fundraiser was started so Singh's family could bring his body back to India for burial.

On 12 December hundreds of people attended a vigil at NorQuest college to mourn and pay respect to Singh, the Alberta First Responders Association (AFRA) recognized Singh as an officer fallen in the line of duty. Three days later on 15 December the AFRA held a memorial service which had over 250 in attendance at the Edmonton Crematorium and Funeral Home.

On 20 December the apartment complex's owner Van Vuong was charged with breaking and entering after he entered a occupied suite. However the charges were later dropped on 26 December.

On 23 December two and half weeks after Singh's murder the city of Edmonton shut down the apartment complex citing 'serious health concerns' as their reason. Around 60 people including 25 children were evicted.

On 8 January 2025, Rain and Saulteaux were brought back into court, but Rain’s lawyer said he needed more time to review the case and they were scheduled to appear back in court on 22 January.

Despite their next court date being scheduled for 22 January, they appeared back on 13 March, both Rain and Saulteaux pleaded not guilty. Their preliminary hearing is scheduled to start on 10 July.
