= Hari Singh (soldier) =

Hari Singh AVSM
- Born: 24 October 1922; Galthani, India
- Died: 14 March 2003 (aged 80)

Hari Singh AVSM (24 October 1922 – 14 March 2003) was a brigadier in the Indian Army who played a significant role in the Indo-Pakistani War of 1965. He was awarded the Ati Vishisht Seva Medal by the President of India for rendering distinguished service of an exceptional order.

== See also ==
- Indo-Pakistani War of 1965
- Indian 1st Armoured Division
- List of regiments of the Indian Army
