= Gulab Singh (disambiguation) =

Gulab Singh (1792–1857) was the founder of royal Dogra dynasty and first Maharaja of the princely state of Jammu and Kashmir.

Gulab Singh is also an Indian male given name and may refer to:

- Sardar Gulab Singh, Sikh warrior
- Gulab Singh (Delhi politician)
- Gulab Singh (Uttar Pradesh politician)
- Gulab Singh Lodhi, activist
- Gulab Singh Rajpurohit, politician
- Gulab Singh Shaktawat, politician
- Gulab Singh Tanwar, politician
- Gulab Singh Thakur, politician
