= Dhruv Singh =

Dhruv Uday Singh can refer to:

- Dhruv Singh (born 1960), Indian politician
- Dhruv Pratap Singh (cricketer) (born 1997), Indian cricketer
- Dhruv Narayan Singh (born 1959), Indian politician
