= Inder Singh =

Inder Singh may refer to:

- Inder Singh (field hockey) (1946–2001), Indian field hockey player
- Inder Singh (footballer) (born 1943), Indian footballer
- Inder Singh (philanthropist) (born 1977), administrator of the U.S. Clinton Foundation
- Inder Singh (community leader) (born 1932), Indian community leader in California
- Inder Singh (politician), senior police officer and politician in Himachal Pradesh, India
- Inder Singh (Balh politician), MLA from Balh Assembly constituency, Himachal Pradesh, India
- Suruchi Inder Singh, Indian Sport Shooter

== See also ==
- Singh
