= Gurnam =

Gurnam or Gurnam Singh may refer to:

- Gurnam Singh (1899–1973), chief minister of Indian Punjab
- Gurnam Singh (runner) (born 1931), Indonesian athlete
- Gurnam Singh (high jumper) (born 1917), Indian athlete
- Gurnam Singh Charuni (born 1959), Indian farm protester
- Gurnam Singh death case, involving Indian cricketer Navjot Singh Sidhu
- Gurnam Singh (soldier), Indian Army officer
