= Dara Singh (disambiguation) =

Dara Singh (1928–2012) was an Indian wrestler, actor and politician.

Dara Singh may also refer to:

- Dara Singh, a 1962 Indian action film by Kedar Kapoor film starring the actor
- Dara Singh (Bajrang Dal) (born 1962), Hindu activist convicted for murders of Christian missionary Graham Staines and his two sons
- Dara Singh Chauhan (born 1963), Indian politician
