= Vir Singh =

Vir Singh/Veer Singh may refer to:

- Vir Singh (gymnast) (born 1930), Indian Olympic gymnast
- Vir Singh (writer) (1872–1957), poet and theologian
- Veer Singh Dhillon (1792–1842), Sikh warrior
- Veer Singh (politician), (born 1956), Indian politician from Bahujan Samaj Party, Member of Parliament - Rajya Sabha - Uttar Pradesh
- Veer Pratap Singh (born 1992), Indian cricketer
- Vir Bahadur Singh (died 1990), Indian politician
- Veersingh Bhuriya, Indian politician
- Veer Pratap Singh, fictional character portrayed by Shah Rukh Khan in the 2004 Indian film Veer-Zaara

== See also ==
- Weerasinghe, a Sinhalese surname
- Veera Simha Reddy, a 2023 Indian film by Gopichand Malineni
