= Bhupendra Singh =

Bhupendra Singh may refer to:

- Bhupendra Singh (Madhya Pradesh politician) (born 1960), Indian politician
- Bhupendra Singh (Uttar Pradesh politician), leader of the BJP in Uttar Pradesh
