= Ravinder Singh =

Ravinder Singh or Ravi Inder Singh may refer to:

- Ravinder Singh (author), Indian novelist
- Ravinder Singh (footballer) (born 1991), Indian football player
- Ravinder Singh (general), chief of the Singapore Army
- Ravinder Singh (sport shooter), (b 1996), Indian sport shooter from Jammu
- Ravinder Singh (wrestler), Indian wrestler
- Ravinder Pal Singh, former Indian hockey player
- Ravinderpal Singh, Canadian cricketer
- Ravinder Singh Tut (born 1969), British Olympic wrestler
- Ravi Inder Singh (cricketer), Indian cricketer
- Ravi Inder Singh (industrialist), Indian industrialist and politician

== See also ==
- Ravinder Singh Bopara, English cricket commonly known as Ravi Bopara (born 1985)
