= Rudra Pratap Singh (disambiguation) =

Rudra Pratap Singh was the first raja of Orchha State who died in 1531 CE.

Rudra Pratap Singh may also refer to:

- R. P. Singh, cricketer born in 1985
- R. P. Singh (cricketer, born 1965)
- Rudra Pratap Singh (politician)
