= Ajay Kumar Singh =

Ajay Kumar Singh may refer to:

- A. K. Singh (full name Ajay Kumar Singh), Lieutenant Governor of Andaman and Nicobar Islands
- Ajay Kumar Singh (Bihar politician, Bharatiya Janata Party), former member of the Bihar Legislative Assembly
- Ajay Kumar Singh (Bihar politician, Indian National Congress), Bihar Legislative Assembly representative from Jamalpur
- Ajay Kumar Singh (Bihar politician, Rashtriya Janata Dal), member of the Bihar Legislative Council
- Ajay Kumar Singh (Uttar Pradesh politician), member of the Legislative Assembly of India
