= Thoi Singh =

Thoi Singh may refer to:

- Thoi Singh Huidrom (born 2004), Indian footballer
- Thoi Singh Khangebam (born 1990), Indian footballer
