= Beant Singh =

Beant Singh may refer to:

- Beant Singh (politician) (1922–1995), chief minister of Punjab, India, from 1992 to 1995
- Beant Singh (assassin) (1959–1984), police officer who assassinated Indian prime minister Indira Gandhi
