= Anurag Singh (filmmaker) =

Indian filmmaker

- Born: 1968 (age 57–58); Varanasi, Uttar Pradesh, India
- Occupation: Filmmaker

Anurag Singh is an Indian documentary filmmaker known for his socio-political, human rights oriented films. He has worked with mass peoples’ movements, including the Narmada Bachao Andolan, National Campaign for People's Right to Information, and Mazdoor Kisan Shakti Sangathan His most famous films are "Kaise Jeebo Re" (1997 – Narmada valley displacement), and "Right to Information" (1999 – Peoples’ demand for RTI, the landmark transparency legislation), which have been screened and won awards internationally.

== Biography ==
Born in 1968 in Varanasi, India, Anurag comes from a small tribal village in Madhya Pradesh. His father Shyam Bahadur Namra was a noted poet and social reformer who worked extensively on education and tribal rights. Anurag's local wisdom and understanding are reflected in the themes and treatment of his films. Involved in photography, cinematography and filmmaking since 1984, Anurag directed his first film 'Manibeli' in 1989, and has since made more than half a dozen films including 'Battle For Peace', 'Kaise Jeebo Re' (How Do I Survive, My Friend), and 'Main Nahi Manga' (We Do Not Ask!). Anurag has also worked with Center for Development of Instructional Technology (CENDIT), an organization that pioneered using of audiovisual technology to communicate sociopolitical issues in India. In 1992 Anurag set up his own film production company Jan Madhyam Productions & in 2004 Rough Cut Productions with Jharana Jhaveri.

== Filmography ==
- 1992: "Manibeli", a video on the police repression and people's struggle in the 1st village of Maharashtra State to be submerged by the controversial Sardar Sarovar Dam: Manibeli. 1992. 43 minutes. Hindi.
- 1992: "Battle for Peace", a video on the Burmese students in exile in India made with them. Aug 1992. 30 minutes. English
- 1997: "Kaise Jeebo Re! (How Do I Survive, My Friend)" A Documentary on the protest against the Narmada dam. 1997. 80 minutes. Hindi.
- 1999: "Main Nai Manga" {We Do Not Ask!} a spot on the Right to Information as a basic need. Screened at Expo 2000, Hanover, Germany. March 1999 3.5 minutes. English (Digital)
- 2000: "Right to Information". 33 minutes. English (subtitled)

== Awards ==
- "Right to Information" won Best Documentary, Transparency International, Prague, Czech Republic., and was 2nd in the Best Non-Fiction award at the 2000 Mumbai International Film Festival.
- "Kaise Jeebo Re! (How Do I Survive, My Friend)" won YIDFF in 1999 in Yamagata, Japan.

== Notable screenings ==
- "Kaise Jeebo Re! (How Do I Survive, My Friend)" was screened at the 1997 International Documentary Film Festival Amsterdam in Amsterdam, Netherlands.
