= Arun Singh =

Arun Singh may refer to:

- Arun Singh (cricketer) (born 1975), Indian cricketer
- Arun Singh (politician, born 1944), Indian politician and union minister of state for defence in the Government of India
- Arun Singh (Indian politician), National General Secretary of the Bharatiya Janata Party of India from 2015
- Arun Kumar Singh, Indian Ambassador to the United States (2015–2016)
- Arun Singh Kushwaha, Member of Bihar Legislative Assembly from Karakat
