= Manjit Singh =

Manjit Singh may refer to:

- Manjit Singh (armament scientist) (born 1958), Indian scientist
- Manjit Singh (footballer) (born 1986), Indian football player
- Manjit Singh (runner) (born 1989) Indian middle-distance runner
- Manjit Singh (strongman), Indian-English strongman
- Manjit Singh (soldier), Indian brigadier
- Manjit Singh Mianwind, Indian politician
- Manjit Singh Bilaspur, Indian politician
- Manjit Singh Lobo, fictional character portrayed by Danny Denzongpa in the 1981 Indian film Bulundi

== See also ==
- Manjeet Singh (disambiguation)
