= Makhan Singh =

Makhan Singh may refer to:

- Makhan Singh (Kenyan trade unionist) (1913–1973), Punjab-born labor union leader; credited with establishing foundations of Kenya's trade unionism
- Makhan Singh (sprinter) (1937–2002), Indian track and field athlete
- Makhan Singh (discus thrower), Indian track and field athlete and winner at the 1951 Asian Games
- Makhan Singh, one of ring names used by American wrestler Mike Shaw (1957–2010)
