= Digvijay Singh =

Digvijay Singh may refer to:

- Digvijaya Singh (born 1947), Indian politician, Former CM of Madhya Pradesh
- Digvijay Singh (Bihar politician) (1955–2010), Indian politician from Banka area of Bihar
- Digvijay Singh (Rajasthan politician), Minister of Agriculture of Rajasthan
- Digvijay Singh (golfer) (born 1972), Indian golfer
- K. D. Singh (field hockey) (Kunwar Digwijay Singh, 1922–1978), Indian field hockey player
- Digvijay Narain Singh (1924–1991), Indian politician from Muzaffarpur area of Bihar
- Digvijaysinhji Ranjitsinhji (1895-1966), Maharaja Jam Sahib of Nawanagar 1933-1948
- Digvijaysinh Jhala (1932–2024), Indian politician
