= Sunder Singh (disambiguation) =

Sunder Singh (c. 1882 – after 1930s) was a Canadian Sikh activist.

Sunder Singh may also refer to:

- Sunder Singh Lyallpuri (1878–1969), Sikh Indian independence activist
- Sunder Singh (known mononymously as Sunder; 1908–1992), Indian actor
- Sunder Singh Bhandari (1921–2005), Indian politician
- Priya Rajvansh (born Vera Sunder Singh; 1936–2000), Indian actress
- Chaudhary Sunder Singh, Indian politician
- Shyam Sunder Singh Dheeraj, Indian politician
- Sunder Singh Thakur (born 1965), Indian politician
- Ebenezer Sunder Singh, Indian American visual artist

== See also ==
- Sundar Singh (disambiguation)
