= Tara Singh =

Tara Singh may refer to:

== People ==
- Tara Singh Hayer (1936–1998), Sikh Canadian newspaper publisher who was murdered in 1998
- Tara Singh (activist) (Master Tara Singh, 1885–1967), Sikh political and religious leader
- Tara Singh Varma (born 1948), former Dutch member of the House of Representatives for the GreenLeft party
- Tara Singh (weightlifter) (born 1955), Indian weightlifter
- Tara Singh (Mumbai politician), (1938-2020) member of the Maharashtra Legislative Assembly
- Tara Singh (author), Indian novelist
- Tara Singh (Sikh prince) (1807–1859)
- Tara Singh (artist) (1931–2016), sculptor from Punjab, India
- Tara Singh, fictional protagonist of the 2001 Indian film Gadar and its sequel Gadar 2 (2023)
- Tara Singh (Haryana politician), a member of the 10th Lok Sabha, representing Kurukshetra Lok Sabha constituency in Haryana state
- Tara Singh Ghaiba (1710–1807), Sikh warrior
- Tara Singh Ramgarhia, Sardar, brother of the famous Jassa Singh Ramgarhia in the late 18th century

== Places ==
- Qila Tara Singh, a town and union council of Depalpur Tehsil in the Okara District of Punjab Province, Pakistan
