= Sajjan Singh =

Sajjan Singh is the name of:

- Sajjan Singh of Udaipur (1859–1884), Maharaja of the princely state of Udaipur, 1874–1884
- Sajjan Singh of Ratlam (1880–1912 or 1913), British Indian Army officer and Maharaja of Ratlam State, 1893–1947
- Sajjan Singh (wrestler) (fl. 1960s), Indian Olympic wrestler
- Sajjan Singh Cheema, Indian basketball player
- Sajjan Singh Sindarli, Indian politician
- Sajjan Singh Verma, Indian politician
- Sajjan Singh, fictional Indian soldier in Sajjan Singh Rangroot (lit. 'Sajjan Singh Recruit'), a 2018 Indian Punjabi-language war drama film by Pankaj Batra
