= Mahavir Singh =

Mahavir Singh may refer to:

- Mahavir Singh (social reformer) (1920–1997), Indian justice, an authority of law and social reformer of India
- Mahavir Singh Phogat, Indian amateur wrestler and senior Olympics coach
- Mahavir Singh (politician) (born 1972), Indian politician and member of the Bharatiya Janata Party
- Mahavir Singh (revolutionary) (1904–1933), Indian revolutionary and independence fighter in the 1930s
