= Udai Singh =

Udai Singh may refer to:

- Udai Singh I (died 1473), ruler of Mewar during 1468–1473
- Udai Singh II (1522–1572), ruler of Mewar during 1540-1572
- Udai Singh of Marwar (1538–1595), ruler of Marwar during 1583-1595
- Udal of Mahoba also Uday Singh, a heroic Indian warrior, contemporary of Prithviraj Chauhan
- Udai Singh II of Dungarpur (1839–1898), ruler of Dungarpur during 1844-1898
- Udai Singh of Pratapgarh (1848–1890), ruler of Dungarpur during 1864-1890

== See also ==
- Uday Singh (disambiguation)
