= Anand Singh =

Anand Singh may refer to:

- Anand Singh (Fijian politician) (1948–2020), Fijian lawyer and former politician of Indian descent
- Anand Singh (cricketer) (born 1986), Indian cricketer
- Anand Singh (Karnataka politician), Indian politician from the state of Karnataka
- Anand Singh (Uttar Pradesh politician) (born 1936)
- Anand Mohan Singh, convicted criminal and was the founder of the Bihar People's Party
