= Virendra Singh =

Virendra Singh may refer to:

- Virendra Singh (physicist) (born 1938), Indian theoretical physicist
- Virendra Singh (judge) (born 1949), lokayukta of Uttar Pradesh, India
- Virendra Singh Mast (born 1956), Lok Sabha member for Bhadohi, India
- Virendra Singh (Uttar Pradesh politician) (born 1959), member of the Sixteenth Legislative Assembly of Uttar Pradesh in India
- Virendra Singh Burdak, member of the 2023 Rajasthan Legislative Assembly
- Virendra Singh (Rajasthan politician), member of the 2023 Rajasthan Legislative Assembly
- Virendra Singh (Mirzapur), Lok Sabha member for Mirzapur, India
- Virendra Kumar Singh (born 1953), Indian politician
- Virendra Singh (Varanasi), Indian politician
- Virendra Singh, fictional character in the 2010 Indian film Lahore

== See also ==
- Virender Singh (disambiguation)
