= Harcharan Singh =

Harcharan Singh may refer to:

- Harcharan Singh Brar (1922–2009), ex-chief minister of Punjab, India
- Hercharn Singh (born 1986), first Sikh officer to be commissioned in the Pakistan Army
- Harcharan Singh (cricketer) (1938-2019), Indian cricketer
- Harcharan Singh (field hockey) (born 1950), Indian field hockey player
- Harcharan Singh (writer) (1914–2006), Punjabi dramatist and writer
- Harcharan Singh Mangat (1932–1988), Indian Air Force officer
