= Uday Singh (disambiguation) =

Uday or Udai Singh may refer to:

- Udayasimha, Ruler of Jalore during c. 1204 – 1257
- Uday Singh (born 1952), an Indian politician
- Uday Singh (religious leader), religious leader of Namdhari Sikhs
- Uday Singh (Fiji politician) (1938–2014), an Indo-Fijian politician
- Uday Singh (Sikh warrior)
- Uday Singh Taunque (1982–2003), an Indo-American Army soldier
- Uday Pratap Singh, an Indian politician
- Uday Pratap Singh (Madhya Pradesh politician), an Indian politician for Madhya Pradesh
- Raja Uday Pratap Singh (born 1933), an Indian titular Raja of the former princely state Bhadri of Oudh from 1970 to present
- Udal of Mahoba also Uday Singh, a heroic Indian warrior, contemporary of Prithviraj Chauhan
- Uday Singh, fictional police inspector played by Danny Denzongpa in the 1982 Indian film Khule-Aam

== See also ==
- Udai Singh (disambiguation)
- Ramkisoen Dewdat Oedayrajsing Varma (1907–1968), Indo-Surinamese politician
