= Vivek Singh =

Vivek Singh may refer to:

- Vivek Singh (cricketer) (born 1993), Indian cricketer
- Vivek Singh (field hockey) (1967–2007), Indian Olympic hockey player
- Vivek Singh (sport shooter), Indian sports shooter
- Vivek Singh (chef) (born 1971), London-based Indian chef
