= Anil Kumar Singh (chemist) =

Anil Kumar Singh is an Indian professor of chemistry at IIT Bombay.

In 2011–2014 he was Vice-chancellor of the University of Allahabad, having held the same post at Bundelkhand University in 2007.
