= Kanwaljit Singh =

Kanwaljit Singh may refer to:

- Kanwaljit Singh (politician), Indian politician
- Kanwaljit Singh (actor), Indian actor
- Kanwaljit Singh (cricketer), Indian former first-class cricketer
- Prince Kanwaljit Singh, Indian Punjabi film actor

== See also ==
- Kanwaljit Singh Bakshi, New Zealand politician
- Kanwarjit Singh Kang, Indian art researcher
- Kanwarjit Singh Rozy Barkandi, Indian politician
- Kanwarjit Paintal, Indian comedian and actor
