= Davinder Singh =

Davinder Singh may refer to:

- Davinder Singh (footballer), Indian footballer
- Davinder Singh (field hockey), Indian field hockey player
- Davinder Singh (lawyer), Singaporean former politician and lawyer
- Davinder Singh Deegan, Kenyan field hockey player
- Devinder Singh Garcha, Indian politician
- Davinder Singh Kang, Indian track and field athlete
- Devinder Singh Garcha, Indian politician
- Devender Singh, Indian artist
- Devender Singh Babli, Indian politician
- Devender Singh Shokeen, Indian former politician
- Devinderjeet Singh Laddi Dhose, Indian politician

== See also ==
- Devendra Singh (disambiguation)
