= Sobha Singh =

Sobha Singh may refer to:

- Sobha Singh (builder), Indian contractor and real estate developer in Delhi
- Sobha Singh (painter), Indian painter
- Sobha Singh (Sikh chieftain), one of the triumvirate rulers of Lahore during the late 18th century
- Qila Sobha Singh (lit. 'Fort Sobha Singh'), a town in Punjab, Pakistan
