= Karam Singh, Pakistan =

Karam Singh
- Town
- Location within Pakistan
- Coordinates: 33.28°N 73.24°E
- Country: Pakistan
- Province: (Islamabad Capital Territory) Islamabad C.T
- Elevation: 605 m (1,985 ft)

Population
  - Total: 42,675
- Time zone: UTC+5 (PST)

Karam Singh is a town in the Islamabad Capital Territory of Pakistan. It is located at 33° 28' 50N 73° 24' 15E with an altitude of 605 metres (1988 feet).
