= Dharam Singh (disambiguation) =

N. Dharam Singh is the 17th Chief Minister of Karnataka.

Dharam Singh may also refer to:

- Dharam Singh (field hockey, born 1919) (1919–2001), field hockey player
- Dharam Singh (field hockey, born 1937), field hockey player
- Dharam Singh (Sikhism) (1666–1708), one of the Panj Payare

== People with the given names ==
- Dharam Singh Deol or Dharmendra
- Dharam Singh Uppal (1959–2013), Indian former international athlete
- Dharam Singh Hayatpur (1884–1926), member of Sikh political and religious group the Babbar Akali Movement
- Dharam Singh Nihang Singh (born 1936), founder of Sachkhoj Academy
- Dharampal Singh Gudha, (born 1897), marathon runner

== See also ==
- Dharma
