= Jaswinder Kaur =

Indian pilot

- Kharar
- Born: Kharar ( Punjab)
- Employer: AirAsia
- Known for: Jassi Pilot Airbus Pilot
- Aviation career
- First flight: Air Deccan Airlines

Jaswinder Kaur is an Indian pilot born in Kharar, SAS Nagar Punjab.
