= Sundar Singh (disambiguation) =

Sundar Singh (1889–c. 1929) was an Indian Christian missionary and sadhu.

Sundar Singh may also refer to:

- Sundar Singh Majithia (1872–1941), Punjabi landowner and politician
- Sunder Singh (also spelled Sundar; c. 1882–after 1930s), Canadian Sikh activist
- Gyani Sundar Singh Sagar (1917–1996), British Sikh scholar and social activist
- Sundar Singh (1929–2017), Indian army officer
- Gabriella Sundar Singh, Canadian actress
- Sundar Singh Gurjar (born 1996), Indian para-athlete

== See also ==
- Sunder Singh (disambiguation)
