= Sarika Singh (Thangka painter) =

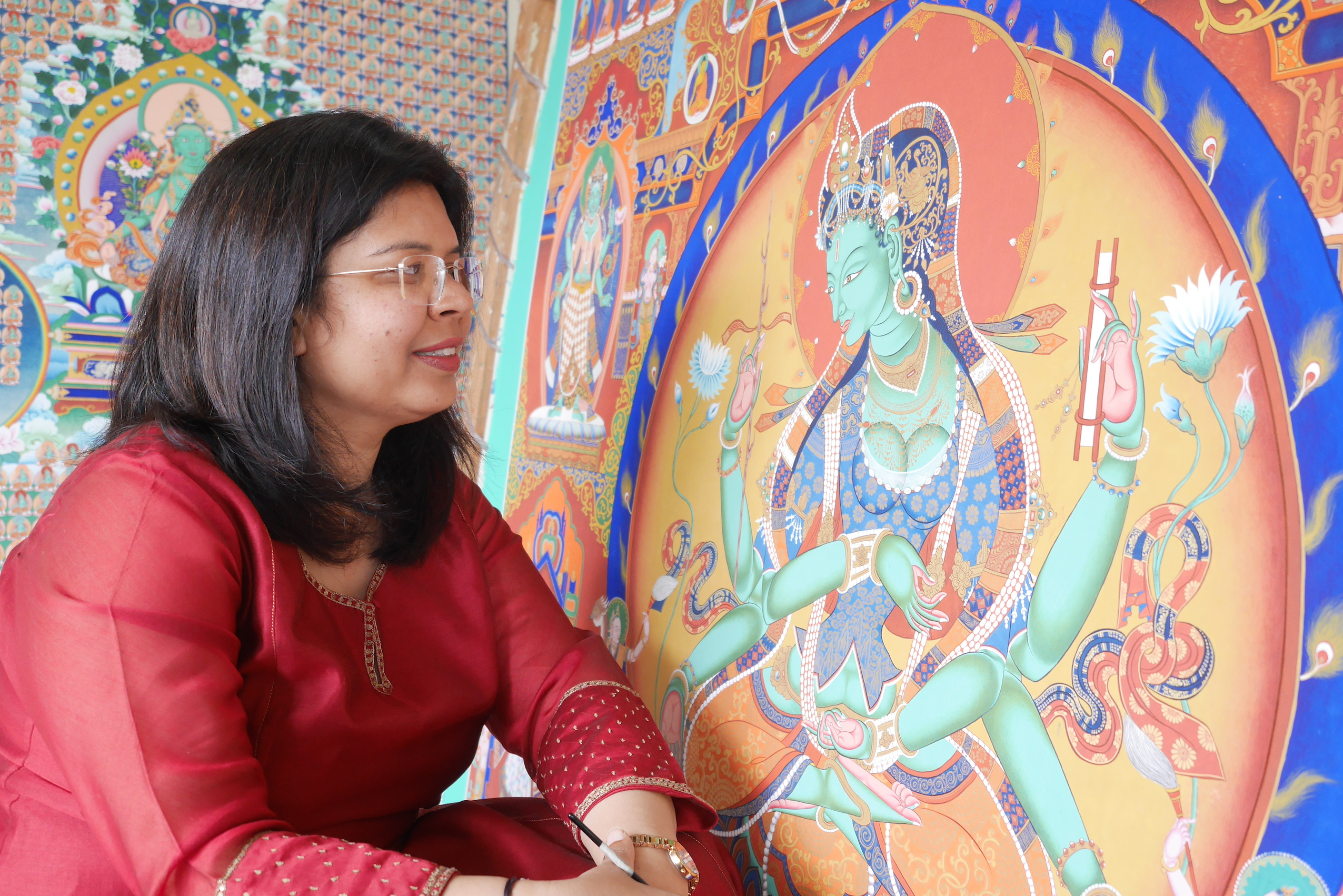
Dr. Sarika Singh, Thangka artist, Teacher and Co-Founder of Center for Living Buddhist Art, Thangde Gatsal Studio and Himalayan Art Museum, Dharamshala; alongside her Alchi Tara Thangka.

Dr. Sarika Singh is an Indian master painter and teacher in the Buddhist tradition of Thangka Painting. She is also the co-founder of the Center for Living Buddhist Art, Thangde Gatsal Thangka Studio, and the Himalayan Art Museum.

== Biography ==
Singh was born on August 13, 1976, in New Delhi. In 1966, she began her studies in the art of Thangka painting at the prestigious Norbulingka Institute in Dharamshala under the tutelage of her master, Tempa Choephel. She completed her master's degree in Buddhist and Tibetan studies from Punjab University in 2015, and PhD from Central University of Himachal Pradesh in 2021.

== Career ==
Singh co-founded the Center for Living Buddhist Art and the Thangde Gatsal Thangka Studio in 2001 with her husband, Master Locho. Locho is also a Master Thangka painter. They established the Himalayan Art Museum in 2019 to connect visitors to the rich cultural heritage of India and Tibet.
