= Gurmail Singh =

Gurmail Singh may refer to:

- Gurmail Singh (field hockey, born 1959), former Indian hockey player
- Gurmail Singh (field hockey, born 1992), Indian field hockey player who plays as a defender
- Gurmel Singh Dhillon song writer
