= Nalini Singh (human rights activist) =

Fijian human rights activist

- Occupation: Human rights activist
- Known for: Director of the Fiji Women's Rights Movement

Nalini Singh is a human rights activist from Fiji. In 2017 she was appointed director of the Fiji Women's Rights Movement.

== Life ==
Singh is a graduate of the University of the South Pacific and the Australian National University.

She has worked with civil society and non-government organisation partners in Fiji and the Asia Pacific. She has held positions with the Asian Pacific Resource and Research Centre for Women (ARROW), the Pacific Regional Human Rights Education Resource Team (RRRT) and the Asia Pacific Forum on Women, Law and Development (APWLD).
