= Ishar Singh (artist) =

Sikh artist

Mahant Ishar Singh Mussawar
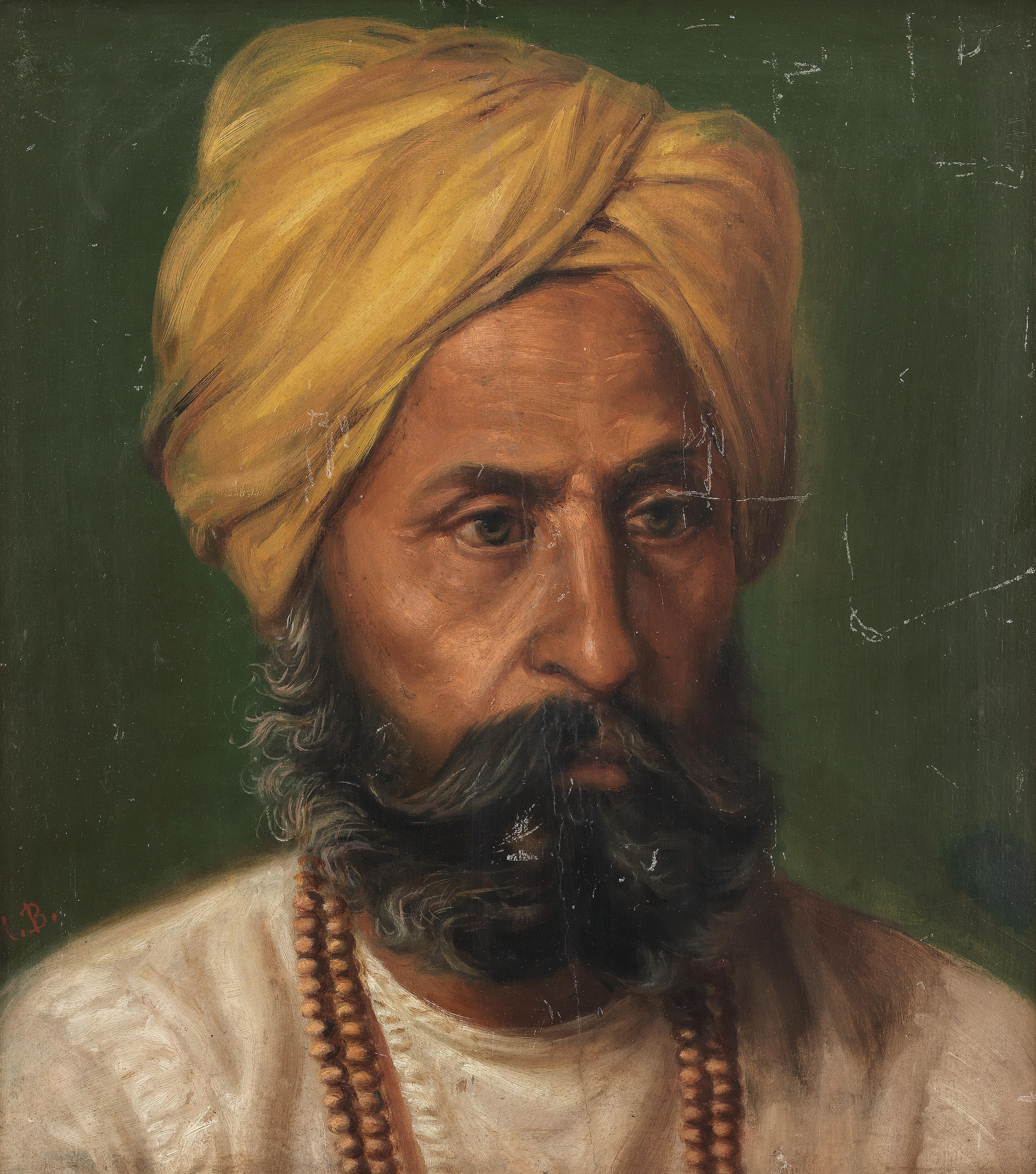
- Portrait of the Sikh artist Ishar Singh, signed by M. B., circa early 20th century
- Born: 1860
- Died: ca.1910
- Style: Sikh School

Ishar Singh (1860–ca.1910), also known as Ishar Singh Naqqash or Ishar Singh Mahant, was a Sikh artist. Ishar Singh was born in 1860 and his father was Bhai Ram Singh Mussawar. Ishar Singh specialized in the Kangra-style and also carried-out mural work. He was one of the artists named in a list prepared by Hari Singh of the known artists who had worked in the Harmandir Sahib complex of Amritsar. He had adopted the style of Kehar Singh and carried-out decoration work on the Darshani Deori structure of the complex. Furthermore, Ishar Singh decorated the edifices of Gurdwara Shahidan in Amritsar and other shrines, including Hindu temples in Amritsar.
