= Surinder Singh =

Surinder Singh may refer to:

== People ==
- Surinder Singh (Ashok Chakra) (died 2002), Indian soldier, recipient of the Ashok Chakra
- Surinder Singh (commando), Indian soldier who turned politician
- Surinder Singh (general), general in the India Army
- Surinder Singh Bajwa (c. 1955 – 2007), politician
- Surinder Singh Kairon (1927–2009), politician
- Surinder Singh of Singh Bandhu, musical duo
- Surinder Singh Sodhi, Indian hockey player
- Surinder Singh Sodhi (Sikh), Sikh militant
- Surinder Singh Nijjar (1949–2021), judge of the Supreme Court of India
- Surinder Singh (footballer) (born 1973), former Indian football player
- Surinder Singh (producer), founder of Surinder Films

== Legal ==
- Surinder Singh route, a method for British citizens to secure U.K. immigration rights for their non-European spouses
- Surinder Singh Kanda v. The Government of the Federation of Malaya, court case
