= Jaspal Singh =

Jaspal Singh may refer to:

- Jaspal Parmar (born 1984), Indian footballer
- Jaspal Singh (cricketer) (1968-2015), Indian cricketer
- Jaspal Singh (singer), Indian singer
- Jaspal Singh, a victim of 2010 Sikh beheadings by the Taliban
