= Jaswinder Singh =

Jaswinder Singh may refer to:

- Jaswinder Singh (novelist) (born 1954)
- Jaswinder Singh (singer) from Mumbai
- Jaswinder Singh Ramdas, politician from Punjab
- Jaswinder Singh (rower) from Punjab
- Jaswinder Singh Sandhu (1955–2019), politician from Haryana
- Jaswinder Singh Sandhu (general), officer of the Indian Army
- Jaz Dhami (born 1986), born Jaswinder Singh Dhami
- Jazzy B (born 1975), born Jaswinder Singh Bains
- Jaswinder Singh, victim of the Indianapolis FedEx shooting
