= Thakur Vishva Narain Singh =

Indian braille editor (1928–2009)

Thakur Vishva Narain Singh (30 July 1928 – 29 September 2009) was the first braille editor of India and an eminent journalist. He served as braille editor in the publication section of the National Institute of Visually Handicapped in Dehradun. After his retirement, he continued to write and worked with local dailies in the city.

Singh was the chief architect behind the creation of a huge library for the visually impaired. He was responsible for getting the Hindu religious books translated into braille.

Thakur Vishva Narain Singh died in Amsterdam while on a family holiday on 29 September 2009.

== Awards ==
- Singh was a recipient of Soviet Land Nehru Award in 1977 for his immense contribution to braille literature and translation of books into braille. He was awarded the prize by the then Minister for External Affairs, Atal Bihari Vajpayee who called him the 'Father of Braille Literature in India'.
- For his particular translation of the Hindu texts Singh was awarded the Tulis Manas Prathishtan, Bhopal by the Madhya Pradesh government.
- Singh was awarded by the Indian Council of Child Education in 1987.
