= Digvijay Singh (Rajasthan politician) =

Indian politician

Digvijay Singh is an Indian politician from Rajasthan who was served as Minister of Agriculture of Rajasthan during the tenure of Bhairon Singh Shekhawat as Chief Minister.

He had split from erstwhile Janata Dal to form Janata Dal (Digvijay) and supported the BJP Government led by Bhairon Singh Shekhawat.

Later the Janata Dal(D) merged with Bharatiya Janata Party.
