= Hari Krishna Singh =

Indian politician

Hari Krishna Singh was an Indian politician, Former MLA, Speaker of Madhya Pradesh Legislative Assembly, Indian Freedom Fighter from the state of the Madhya Pradesh. He represented Berasia Vidhan Sabha constituency of undivided Madhya Pradesh Legislative Assembly by winning General election of 1957.
