= Sartaj Singh =

Sartaj Singh may refer to:

== People ==
- Sartaj Singh (politician) (1940–2023), an Indian politician
- Sartaj Singh (general) (died 1998), a Lieutenant General in the Indian Army
- Sartaj Singh Pannu, Indian filmmaker
- Sartaj Singh, the protagonist of the 2018 TV series Sacred Games
