= List of institutions of higher education in Bikaner =

A list of universities and colleges in Bikaner in Rajasthan, India.

== Universities ==
- Maharaja Ganga Singh University
- Rajasthan University of Veterinary and Animal Sciences
- Ram Narayan Bajaj Global University
- Swami Keshwanand Rajasthan Agricultural University
- Vardhman Mahavir Open University Kota, Bikaner
- Bikaner Technical University, Bikaner

== Colleges ==
- B.J.S. Rampuria Jain Law College, Bikaner (RLC)
- Engineering College, Bikaner (ECB)
- College of Engineering & Technology, Bikaner
- Sardar Patel Medical College, Bikaner
- Veterinary College, Bikaner
- Marudhar Eng.college
- Keen College
- Dungar College
- Maharani Sudarshan College (M.S. College)
- B.J.S. Rampuria Jain College
- Shri Jain P.G. College
- Shri Nehru Sharda Peeth
- Binani Girls College
- Shri Jain Girls College
- Institute of Management Studies
- After School Centre for Social Entrepreneurship
- Government Polytechnic College Bikaner
- M.N Institute of Applied Sciences
- Manda Institute of Technology
- Basic PG College
- Sister Nivedita Girls College, Bikaner, Rajasthan, India

== See also ==
- List of schools in Bikaner, Rajasthan
