= ECB =

ECB may refer to:

== Businesses and organizations ==
=== Banking and finance ===
- European Central Bank, an institution of the European Union
- Equatorial Commercial Bank, later Spire Bank, in Kenya

=== Sport ===
- England and Wales Cricket Board, the national governing body of cricket
- Emirates Cricket Board, the governing body of certain cricket activities in United Arab Emirates
- East Coast Bays AFC, a New Zealand football club

=== Education ===
- Environmental Campus Birkenfeld, of Trier University of Applied Sciences in Germany
- Wisconsin Educational Communications Board, in the US
- Government Engineering College Bikaner, in Rajasthan, India

== Other organizations ==
- ECB Project (Emergency Capacity Building Project), an NGO partnership to improve humanitarian response
- Environmental Control Board, of the New York City Office of Administrative Trials and Hearings
- European Chemicals Bureau, a former organisation of the European Union

== Technology ==
- Electronic codebook, a block cipher encryption mode
- Electronically controlled brake, a Toyota brake-by-wire system
- Ethylene copolymer bitumen, for waterproofing
- Entity–control–boundary, an architectural pattern in object-oriented programming
- Europe Card Bus, a 1977 computer bus

== Other uses ==
- East Coast Bays, Auckland, New Zealand
- External commercial borrowing, a type of loans in India
- Class ECB trains, a class of Reading electric multiple units
