= Manoj Dixit =

Indian academic

Dr. Manoj Dixit
- Citizenship: Indian
- Occupations: Academic, Professor
- Years active: 2023–present (Vice-chancellor, Maharaja Ganga Singh University)
- Title: Vice-chancellor, Maharaja Ganga Singh University, Bikaner Rajasthan

Manoj Dixit is an Indian academic currently serving as the vice-Chancellor of Maharaja Ganga Singh University, Bikaner Rajasthan, India. Before taking this position, he worked as the Prof. and Head, in Department of Public Administration, University of Lucknow, Uttar Pradesh, India from August 2020 to August 2023.

He also served as the Vice Chancellor of Dr. Ram Manohar Lohia Avadh University, Ayodhya, Uttar Pradesh, India from May 2017 to July 2020.

He has received many awards. He received the Award for Research Leadership by Alfred Nobel University, Dnipro, Ukraine (Jointly with Dr. Saurabh Chandra) for fostering scientific research in areas of public administration and public policy.
