= College of Community Science =

College in Bikaner, Rajasthan, India

Coordinates: 28.076607°N 73.342042°E

- Type: Governmental
- Established: 1988
- Affiliations: SKRAU
- Chancellor: Kalyan Singh
- Vice-Chancellor: Raksha Pal Singh
- Dean: Vimla Dunkwal
- Location: Bikaner, Rajasthan, India
- Campus: Urban
- Website: www.ccsraubikaner.org

College of Community Science (CCSc), formerly College of Home Science (CHSc), is a college in Bikaner, Rajasthan, India, affiliated by Swami Keshwanand Rajasthan Agricultural University, Bikaner. It was established in year 1988.
