= College of Veterinary and Animal Science, Bikaner =

College of Rajasthan University of Veterinary and Animal Sciences

Coordinates: 28.0323°N 73.3292°E

- Other names: Veterinary College, Bikaner
- Former names: Rajasthan Veterinary College
- Type: Government
- Established: 1954
- Location: Bikaner, Rajasthan, India
- Campus: Urban
- Website: rajuvas.org/bikaner/

The College of Veterinary and Animal Science, Bikaner, formerly Rajasthan Veterinary College, also known as Veterinary College, Bikaner, is a constituent college of Rajasthan University of Veterinary and Animal Sciences.

== History ==
This college was established on 16 August 1954 as Rajasthan Veterinary College. It then became a part of the Rajasthan University. In 1962 the Rajasthan Agriculture University was started and the college became part of it. In 1964 it became affiliated with the University of Udaipur. When the Rajasthan Agricultural University was bifurcated from the University of Udaipur in 1987, the college a constituent college. Finally, in 2010 it became a constituent college of the Rajasthan University of Veterinary and Animal Sciences which operates from the same grounds.
