= Gajner Wildlife Sanctuary =

Wildlife sanctuary in Rajasthan, India

Coordinates: 27°57′9.8″N 73°3′25.1″E

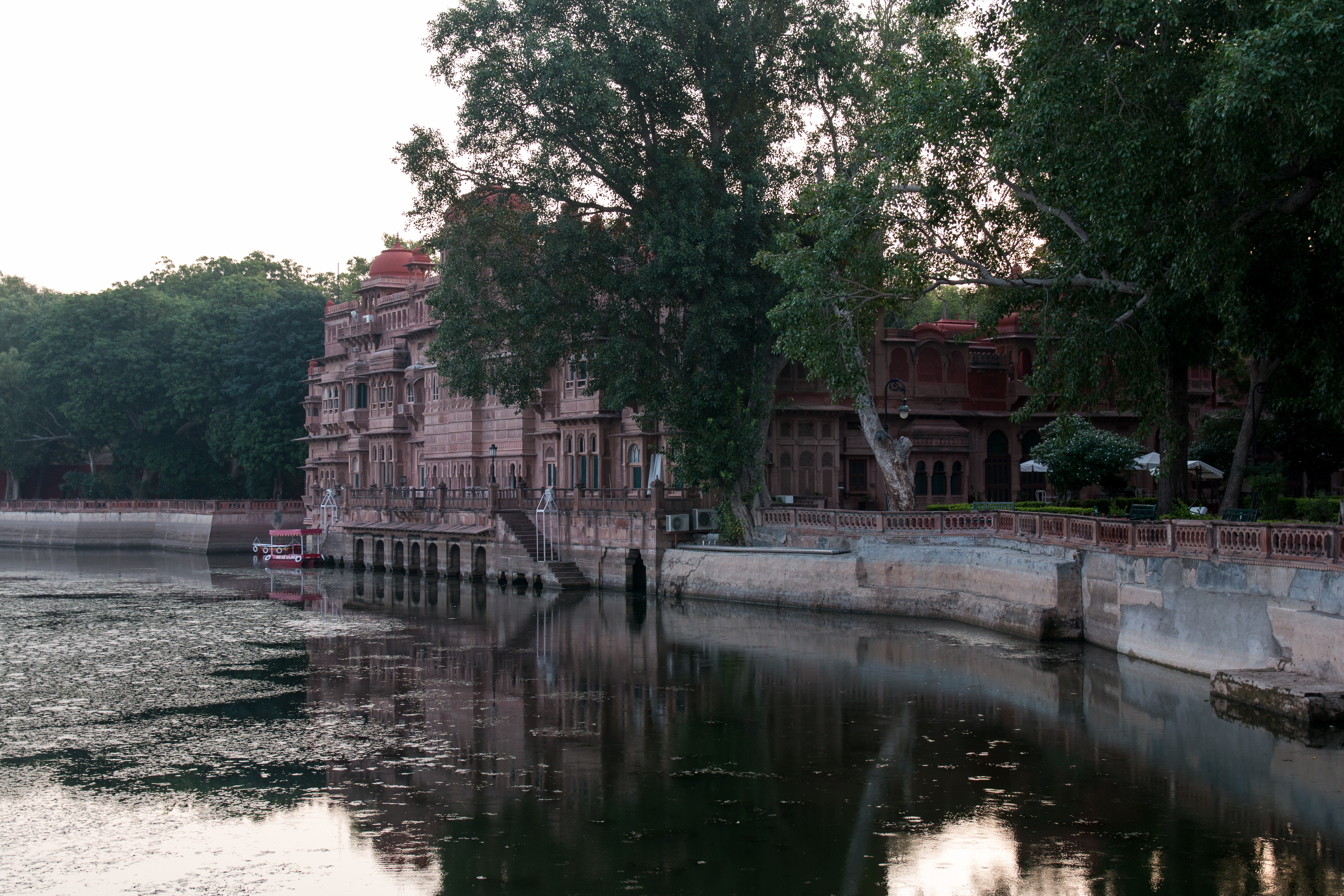
- Palace of a Maharajah.
- Interactive map of Gajner Wildlife Sanctuary
- Location: Approximately 32.0 km (19.9 mi) from Bikaner, India
- Established: 1985

Gajner Wildlife Sanctuary is located at a distance of about 32.0 km (19.9 miles) from Bikaner. In former times, it was a hunting ground for the Maharajah of Bikaner. There is a lake in this sanctuary and a variety of animals come here to quench their thirst in summer. This is one of the proposed forests for the reintroduction of cheetahs in India.

== Flora and fauna ==
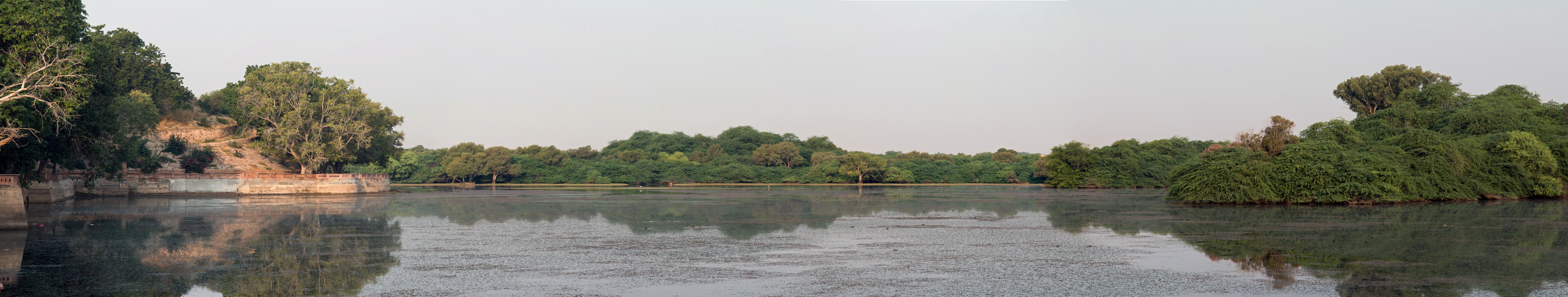

The lake in the wildlife sanctuary draws a variety of bird species. The residential species include wildfowl, deer, antelope, nilgai, chinkara, black buck, desert fox and wild boar. The minimum temperature ranges from -1°C to 2.6°C, with an average of 0.97°C. The maximum temperature ranges from 43°C to 47.7°C, averaging 46.4°C.
