= Bikaner Development Authority =

Development Authority in India

- BDA

Agency overview
- Jurisdiction: Rajasthan
- Status: Active
- Headquarters: Bikaner, Rajasthan, India
- Parent agency: Government of Rajasthan

Bikaner Development Authority (BDA) is a government agency formed in 2024 by the Government of Rajasthan. It was created to manage and plan urban development in Bikaner city and nearby areas. The authority replaced the Urban Improvement Trust (UIT) and is responsible for tasks such as land use planning, approving building layouts, and developing public infrastructure. Its area of work includes Bikaner city, Napasar, Deshnok, and surrounding villages. The main office of the authority is located in the Jodbeed area of Bikaner.
