= Keen College =

- Latin: Keen Collegium
- Established: 2003
- Affiliations: MGS University Bikaner
- President: Er. M P Jyani
- Principal: Dr. Anupama Chowdhary
- Location: Campus: Gadhwala Road, Bikaner. City Office : Jai Nayayan Vyas Colony, 5 E 188,189, Bikaner, Bikaner, Rajasthan, India
- Website: keencollege.com

Keen College is a multi-faculty professional college located in Bikaner in the Indian state of Rajasthan. Founded in 2003, is affiliated to University of Bikaner and approved by Department of College Education of Government of Rajasthan. Keen College was the first college in Bikaner to start professional degree and diploma such as BCA, and MSc in computer science. The college provides distance learning courses from Maharishi Dayanand University, Guru Jambheshwar University of Science & Technology and the Barkatullah University.
