= Ethylene copolymer bitumen =

Ethylene copolymer bitumen (ECB) is a black-colored mixture based on high quality polyethylene copolymers with different proportions of various special and amorphous bitumen grades.

The ECB membrane (used for waterproofing) was invented in 1968.
