= Rajasthan University of Veterinary and Animal Sciences =

State agricultural university in Bikaner, India

- Type: Public
- Established: 2010; 16 years ago
- Affiliations: UGC, ICAR
- Chancellor: Governor of Rajasthan
- Vice-Chancellor: Dr. Sumant Vyas
- Location: Bikaner, Rajasthan, India
- Website: rajuvas.org

Rajasthan University of Veterinary and Animal Sciences (RAJUVAS) is a state agricultural university located at Bikaner, Rajasthan, India. It was established in 2010 by the Rajasthan University of Veterinary and Animal Sciences Act, 2010 of the Government of Rajasthan, amended in 2013. Its constituent colleges are College of Veterinary and Animal Science, Bikaner (CVAS Bikaner), College of Veterinary and Animal Science, Navania, Vallabhnagar, Udaipur (CVAS Udaipur) and Post Graduate Institute of Veterinary Education and Research (PGIVER). It also has 65 other institutes awarding two-year diplomas.
