= Swaroopdesar =

Village in Rajasthan, India

- village
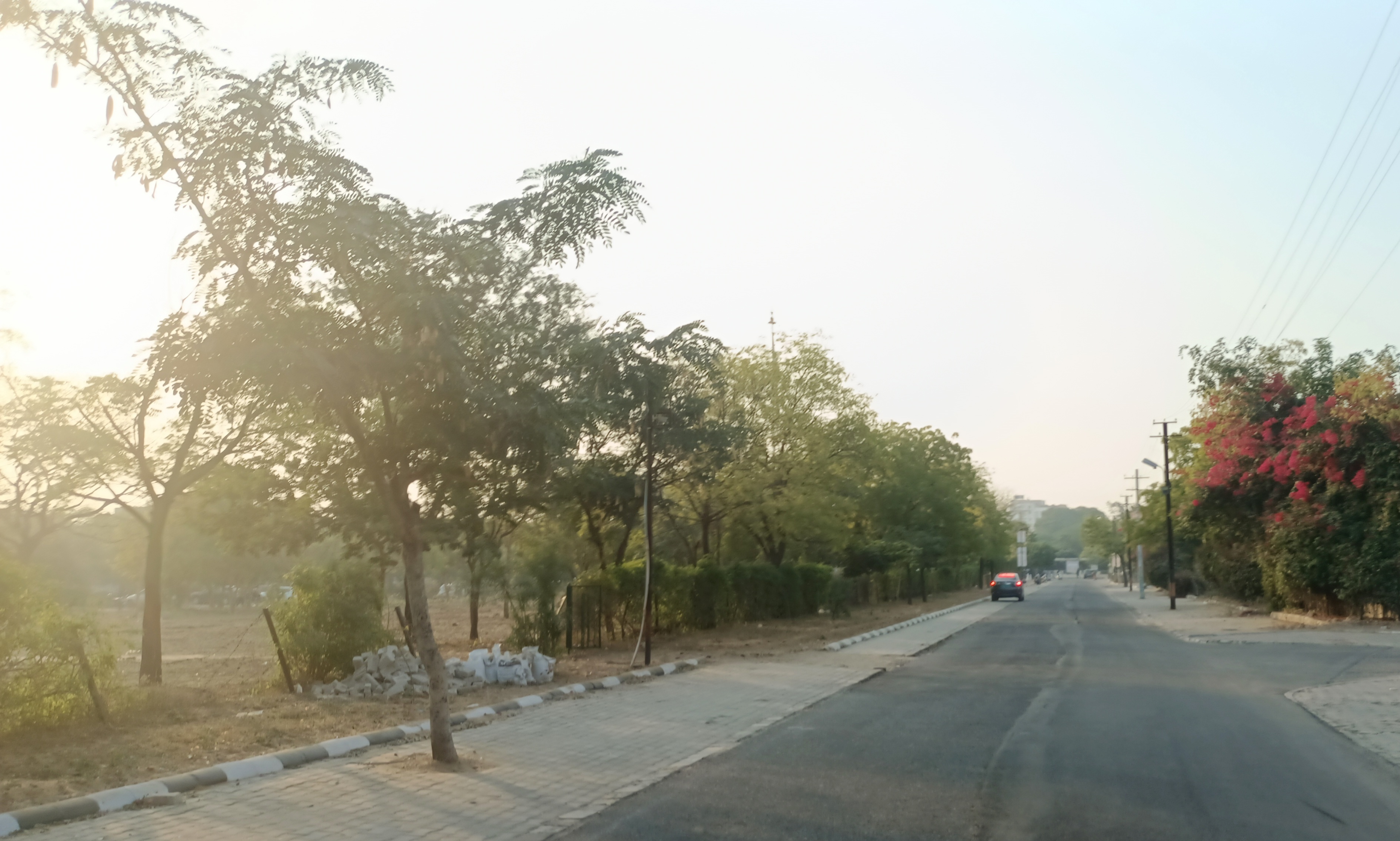

- Location in Rajasthan, India Swaroopdesar (India)
- Coordinates: 27°53′51″N 73°12′22″E
- Country: India
- State: Rajasthan
- District: Bikaner

Languages
  - Official: Rajasthani; Hindi
- Vehicle registration: RJ-07

Swaroopdesar is a village located in Bikaner Tehsil of Bikaner district, Rajasthan, India, with total 495 families residing. The Swaroopdesar village has population of 4052 of which 2156 are males while 1896 are females as per Population Census 2011.
