= Government Engineering College Bikaner =

Indian technical education institute in Bikaner, Rajasthan

Coordinates: 28.0599008°N 73.2927751°E

Govt. Engineering College Bikaner
- Former name: Engineering College
- Motto: A place to learn; a chance to grow.
- Type: Government
- Established: 2000
- Affiliations: Bikaner Technical University
- Principal: Dr. Sanjeev Jain
- Academic staff: 200+
- Students: 4000+ (ECB Campus)
- Location: Govt. Engineering College Bikaner, Karni Industrial Area, Pugal Road, Bikaner 334004, Bikaner, Rajasthan, India
- Campus: Urban, Spread Over 150 Acres
- Colours: Steel grey and white
- Website: ecb.ac.in

Government Engineering College Bikaner, is a public educational institution of the government of Rajasthan, India. The institute is a constitute college of the Bikaner Technical University.

== History ==
The college was founded in November 2000 with two branches (CSE and ECE) filling a total of 120 seats. In 2002, the college introduced four new branches, with intake increasing to 390. The college now provides postgraduate courses degree in M.Tech, MBA and MCA, undergraduate courses BCA and BBA, and B.Tech degree in nine branches - CSE, IT, AI & DS, CE, ECE, EE, IT, ME and EIC with a total intake of 650 students.College recently introduced a New branch Artificial Intelligence & Data Science in 2020 with the intake of 60 students.

== Academics ==
=== Programmes ===
ECB offers a wide variety of courses of study in engineering, sciences, management, design and humanities with a primary focus on engineering. Nine four-year undergraduate courses of study leading to the Bachelor of Technology degree. Postgraduate degrees award Master of Technology (M.Tech), Master of Science (M.Sc.), Master of Business Administration (M.B.A) and Master of Urban Planning.

=== Financial aid ===
More than 30 financial aid schemes are made available to students under different criteria to support institute fees and in some cases hostel accommodation as well.

=== Ranking ===
University rankings

Engineering College Bikaner, Bikaner was ranked 25th among engineering colleges by the National Institutional Ranking Framework (NIRF) Innovation in 2023.

=== Requisites for enrollments ===
Admission to undergraduate courses of the institute is through the Rajasthan Engineering Admission Process (REAP) which takes into account the performance in Joint Entrance Examination (JEE) and/or percentage scored in Senior Secondary (12@th) standard.

Admission for post graduate course namely Master of Technology (M.Tech.) through Centralized Counselling for MTech after Graduate Aptitude Test in Engineering(GATE).

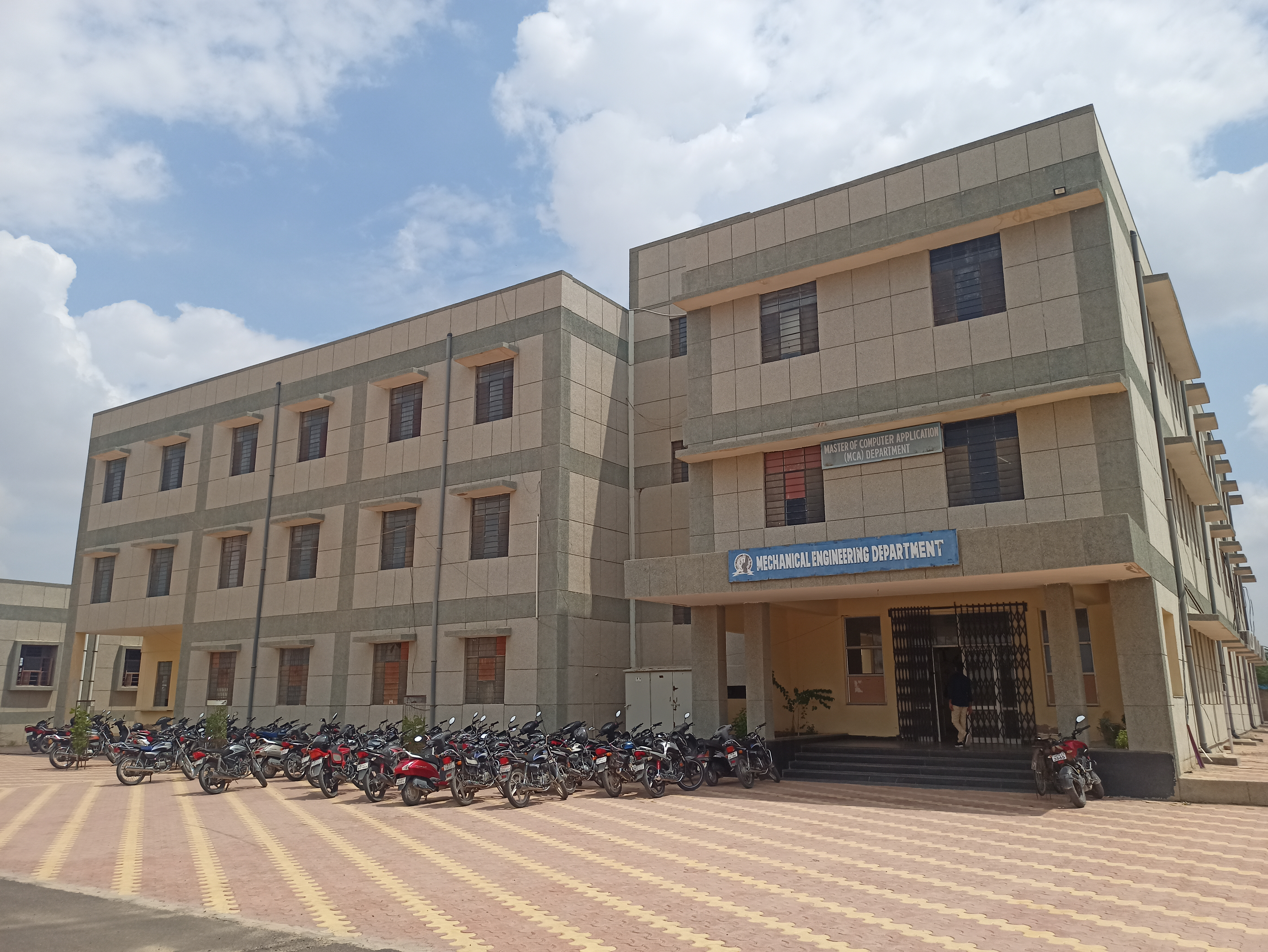
Mechanical Engineering Department (ECB Bikaner)

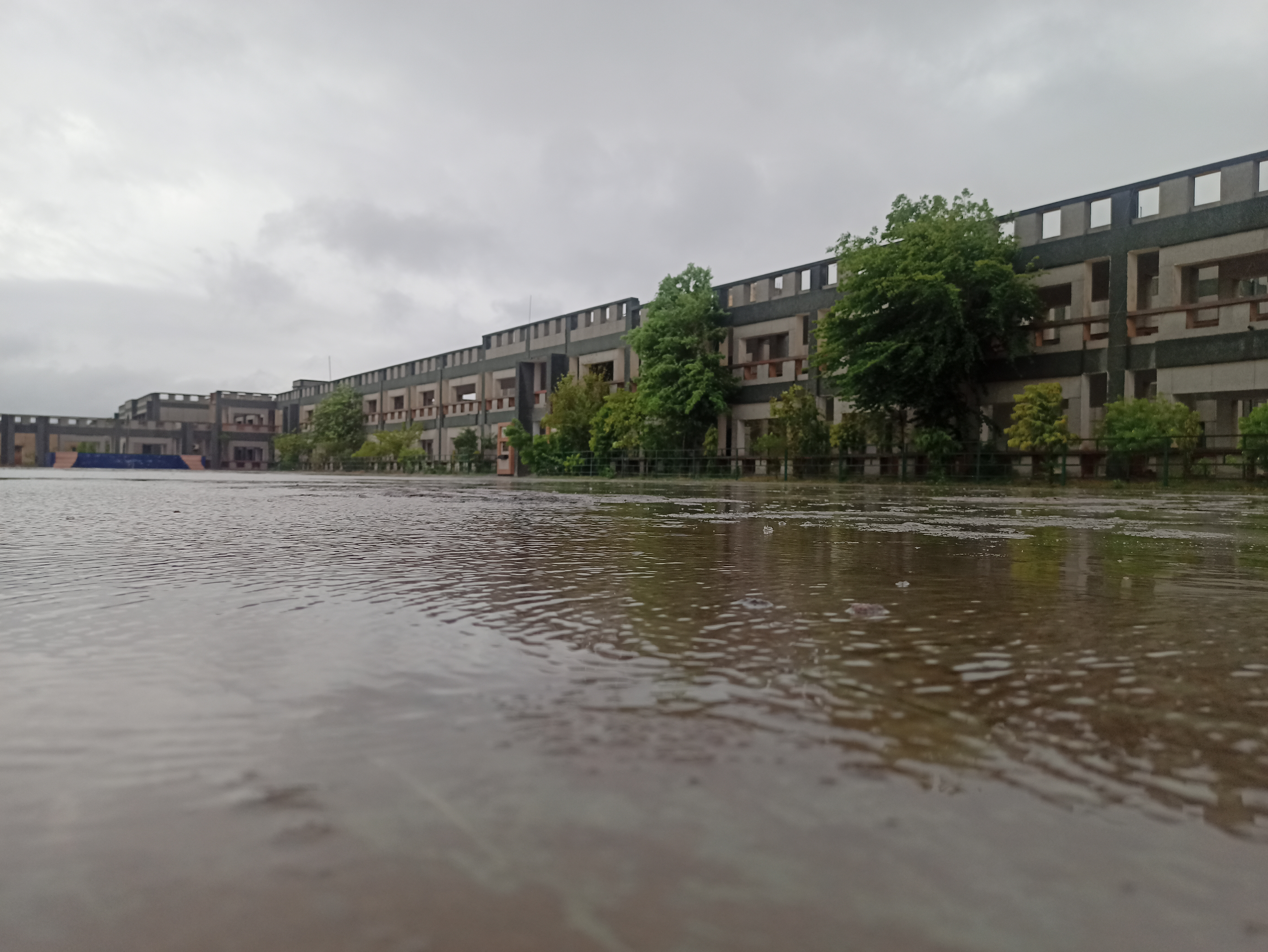
ECB Campus Inside

== Departments and Centres ==
=== Engineering departments ===
- Artificial intelligence and Data Science
- Civil Engineering
- Computer Science & Engineering
- Electrical Engineering
- Electronics and Communication Engineering
- Electronic Instrumentation & Control Engineering (Automation and Robotics)
- Mechanical Engineering

=== Science Departments ===
- Applied Physics
- Applied Chemistry
- Mathematics

=== Allied Departments ===
- Department of Computer Application
- Management & Technology Department

== Student life ==
=== SRIJAN ===
'SRIJAN' is the annual cultural fest of ECB Bikaner. It is a 3-day event held towards the start of January every year and attracts a crowd of over 2000 students from University.

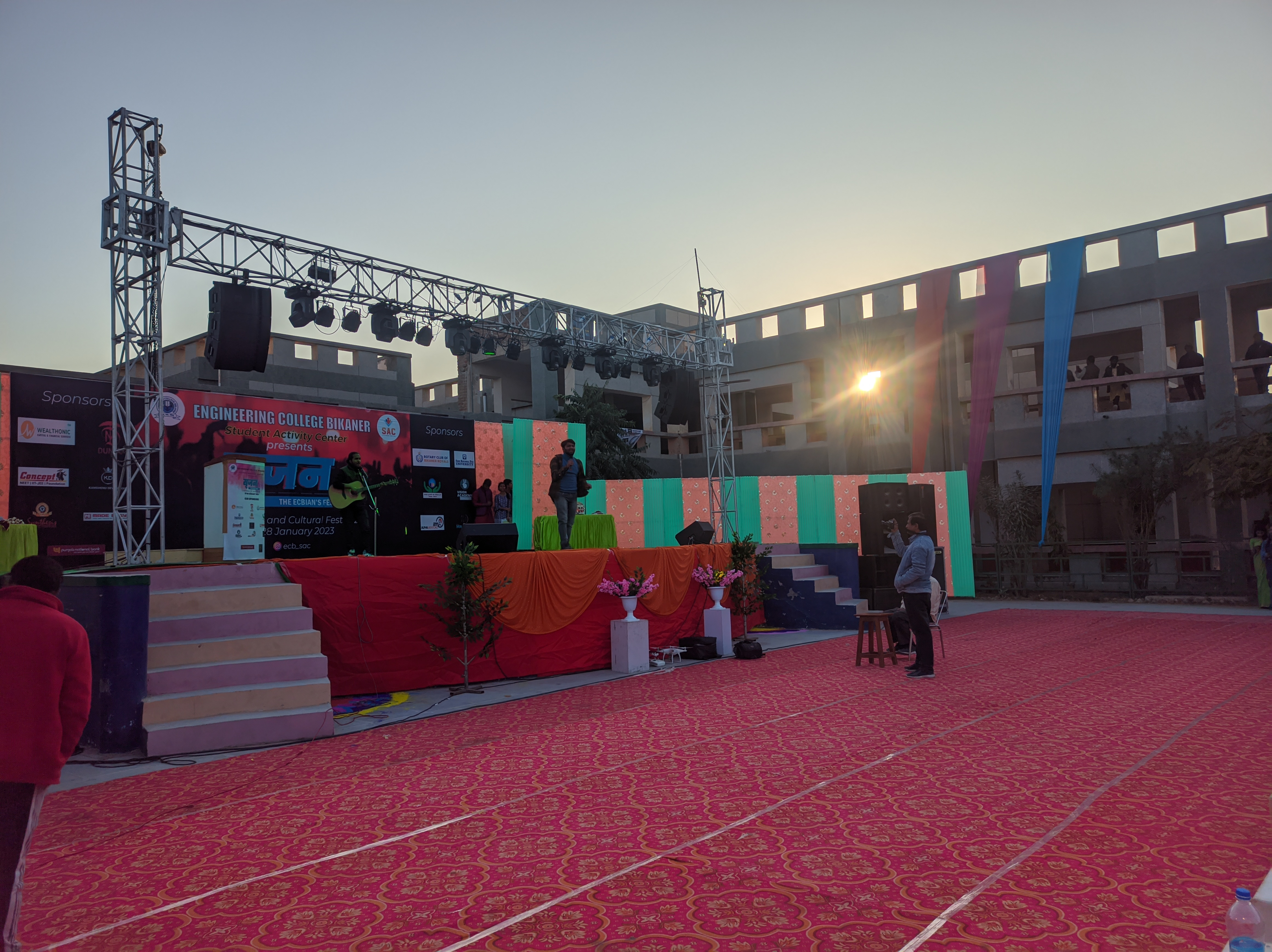
Cultural fest 'Srijan' (ECB)

"Srijan" is a Sanskrit word meaning "creation" or "innovation." Aimed to showcases and celebrates the diverse cultures, traditions, and backgrounds of the student body. This fosters an inclusive environment and helps students learn about and appreciate different cultures.

the event has played host to lectures, seminars, workshops, competitions, exhibitions, and quizzes.

The event is organized by the SAC (Student Activity Center) under the guidance of their teachers.

=== AAHVAAN ===
'AAHVAAN' is the annual Sports fest of ECB Bikaner. It is a 3-day event held towards the start of November every year and Attended by 500+ players from university. The term "Aahvaan" is derived from Sanskrit, meaning "invitation" or "call to action."

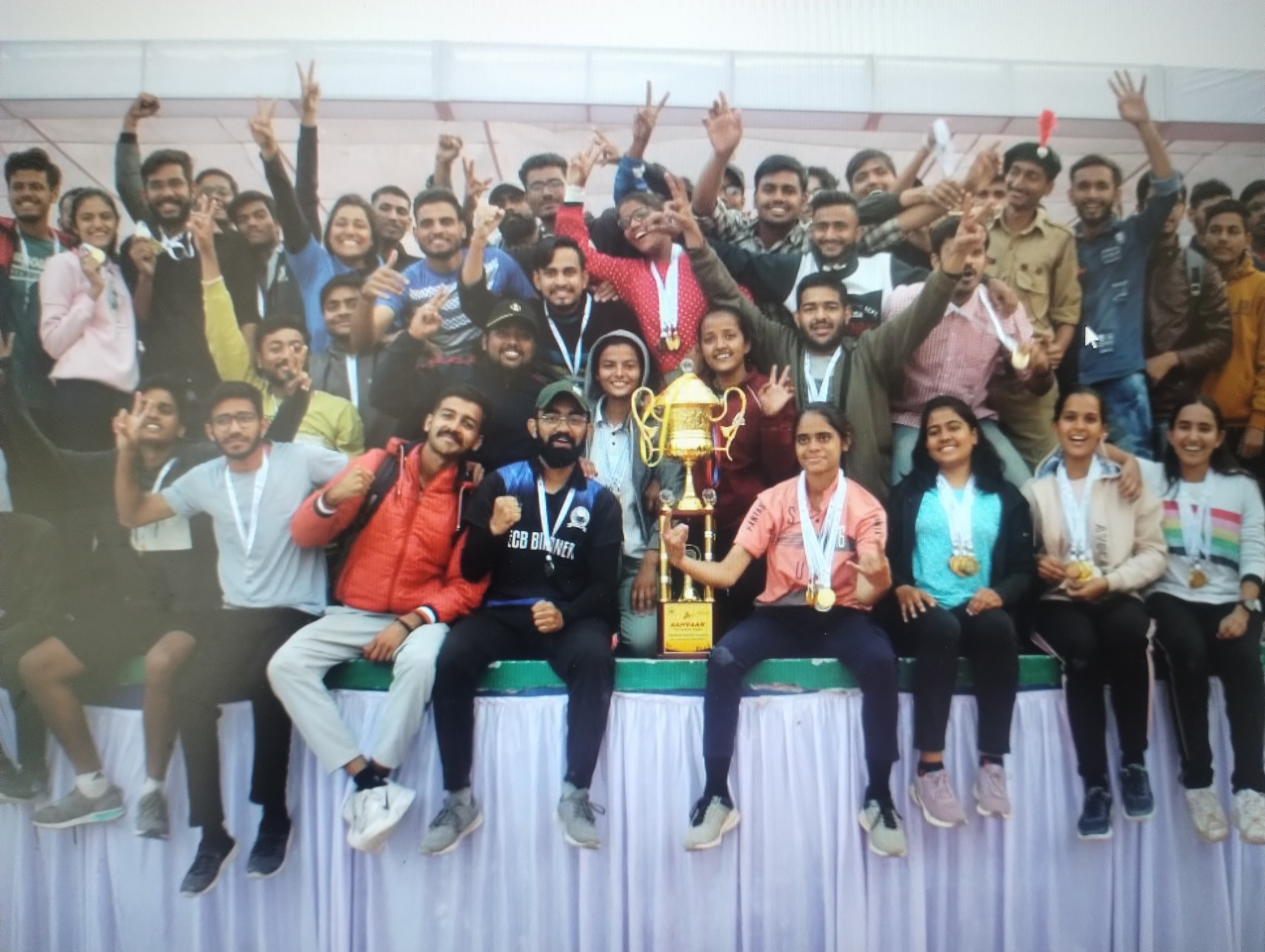
AAHVAAN 2K23 (ECB)

This fest is more than just a series of athletic competitions; it is a gathering that fosters teamwork, builds character, and strengthens the bonds within the college community. Through a diverse array of sporting events, workshops, and cultural activities, Aahvaan Sports Fest aims to inspire and motivate participants to push their limits and achieve their best. This event is designed to highlight the ingenuity, teamwork, and strategic thinking that are integral to sports.
