= Maharaja Ganga Singh University =

Public university in Bikaner, India

Maharaja Ganga Singh University, Bikaner
- Former name: University of Bikaner
- Type: Public
- Established: 2003; 23 years ago
- Affiliations: UGC
- Chancellor: Governor of Rajasthan
- Vice-Chancellor: Narsi Ram Bishnoi
- Location: Bikaner, Rajasthan, India
- Campus: Urban
- Website: www.mgsubikaner.ac.in

Maharaja Ganga Singh University (MGSU, formerly known as University of Bikaner) is an educational institution in Bikaner, Rajasthan, India. It is a public state university located in Bikaner. It functions as an affiliating university for colleges across the Bikaner division and offers undergraduate, postgraduate, diploma, and doctoral programs in numerous academic disciplines.

== History ==
The university was established through the University of Bikaner Act, 2003, enacted by the Government of Rajasthan. Its formation marked an important phase in the expansion of higher education in the desert regions of Rajasthan, particularly in the districts of Bikaner, Churu, Hanumangarh, and Sri Ganganagar.

Shortly after its establishment, the institution was renamed Maharaja Ganga Singh University in memory of Maharaja Ganga Singh of Bikaner, one of the most prominent rulers of princely Rajasthan. Ganga Singh was known for his administrative reforms, modernization projects, educational initiatives, and contributions to public infrastructure in the Bikaner State during the late nineteenth and early twentieth centuries.

The university received recognition under Section 12(B) of the University Grants Commission (UGC) Act, enabling it to receive central assistance and support for academic development.

== Campus ==
The university campus is situated on NH-15 along the Jaisalmer Road in Bikaner. The campus extends over a large area and contains academic buildings, administrative offices, laboratories, a library, sports facilities, hostels, and an auditorium. Reports describe the campus as having modern infrastructure intended to support teaching, research, and student activities.
