= Swami Keshwanand Rajasthan Agricultural University =

State university in Rajasthan, India

- Former name: Rajasthan Agricultural University
- Type: Public
- Established: 1987; 39 years ago
- Affiliations: UGC, ICAR
- Chancellor: Governor of Rajasthan
- Vice-Chancellor: Rajendra Babu Dubey
- Location: Bikaner, Rajasthan, India, India
- Campus: Urban
- Website: www.raubikaner.org

Swami Keshwanand Rajasthan Agricultural University (SKRAU), formerly Rajasthan Agricultural University, is a state agricultural university located in Bikaner in the Indian state Rajasthan. The university, formerly a part of the Mohanlal Sukhadia University, Udaipur became a separate entity in 1987 through Rajasthan Agriculture University, Bikaner Act, 1987. It was renamed after freedom fighter and social reformer Swami Keshwanand in 2009. Raksha Pal Singh was appointed vice chancellor in 2019.

== Campuses and colleges ==
The University consists of three colleges. College of Agriculture, Home Science and Agriculture Business Management. College of agriculture, Jobner was separated from it and was made a University in 2013. The constitute colleges include:

- College of Agriculture, Bikaner
- College of Community Science, Bikaner
- Institute of Agribusiness Management, Bikaner
- Academic Staff College cum Distance Education Centre, Bikaner

The university is authorized to provide instruction in Agriculture and Allied Sciences which include Horticulture, Veterinary & Animal Sciences, Home Science and Agri-Business Management. It has also been authorized in other fields of agricultural learning, which the University may deem fit. It is empowered to maintain academic institutions, dealing with agriculture, veterinary and animal sciences, home science, agri-business management, etc., to carry out instruction in these faculties, hold examinations, and confer degrees, diplomas, pertaining to professional qualifications.
