= Bikaner =

City in Rajasthan, India

Bikaner Bikano
- City
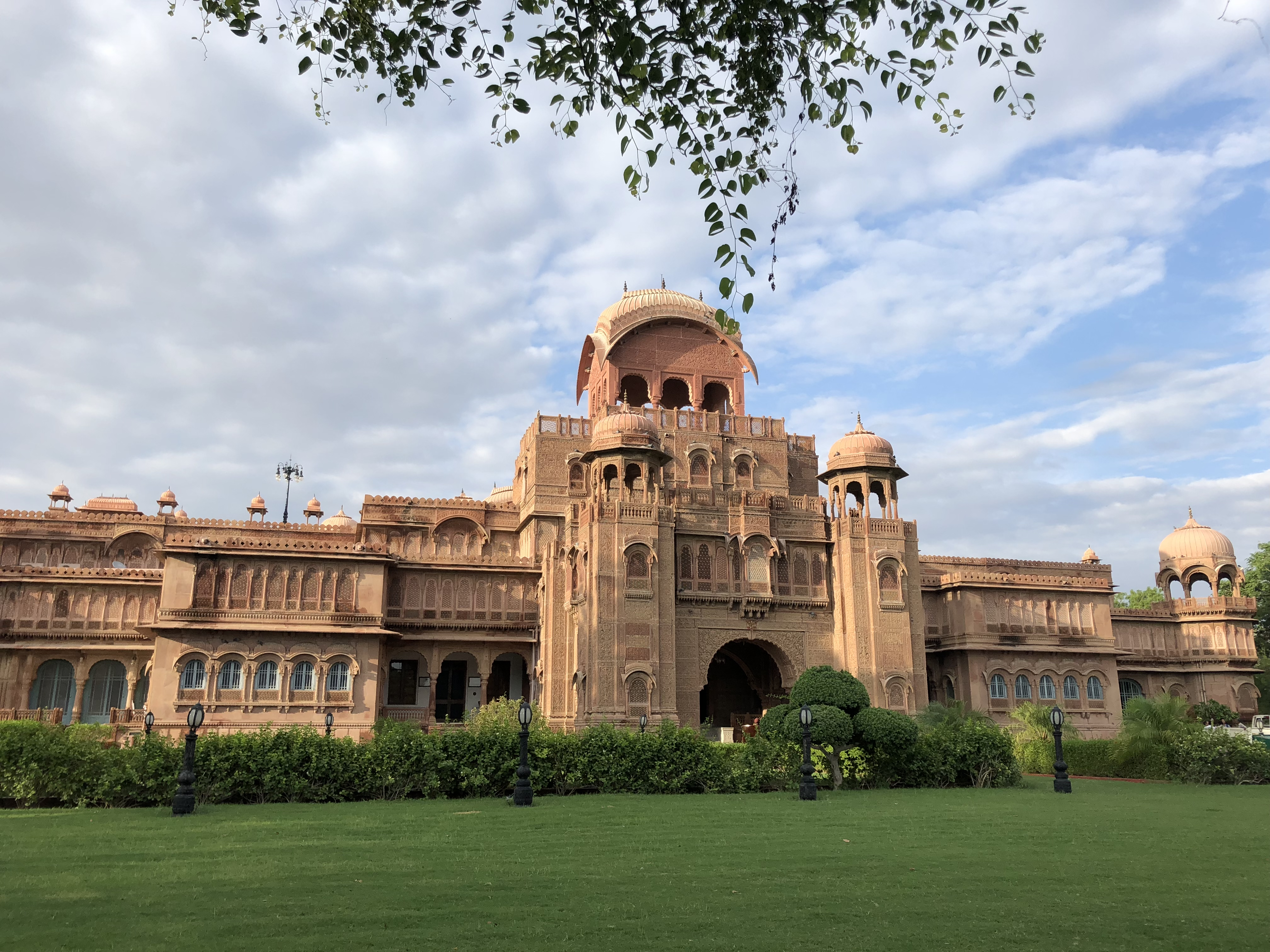
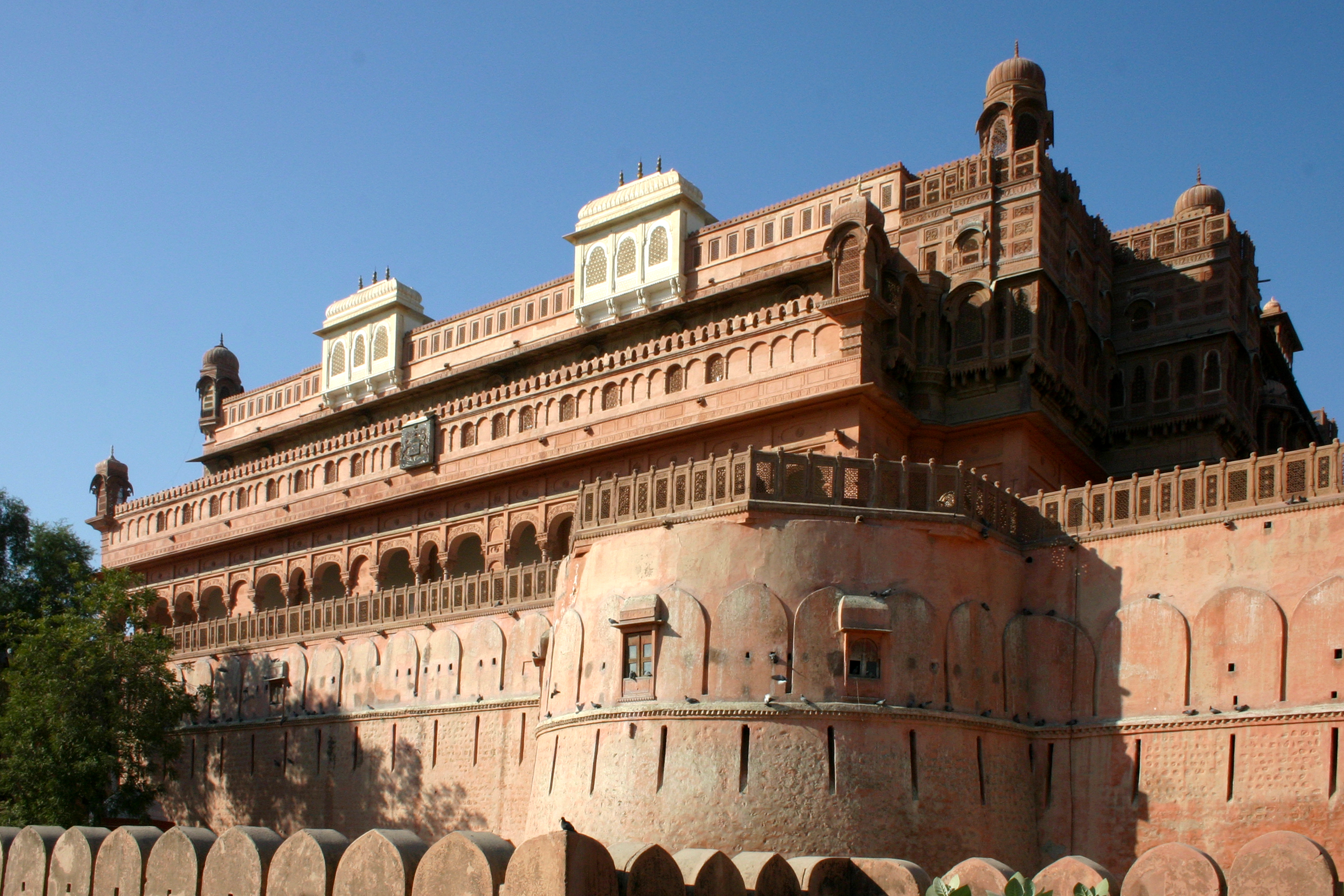
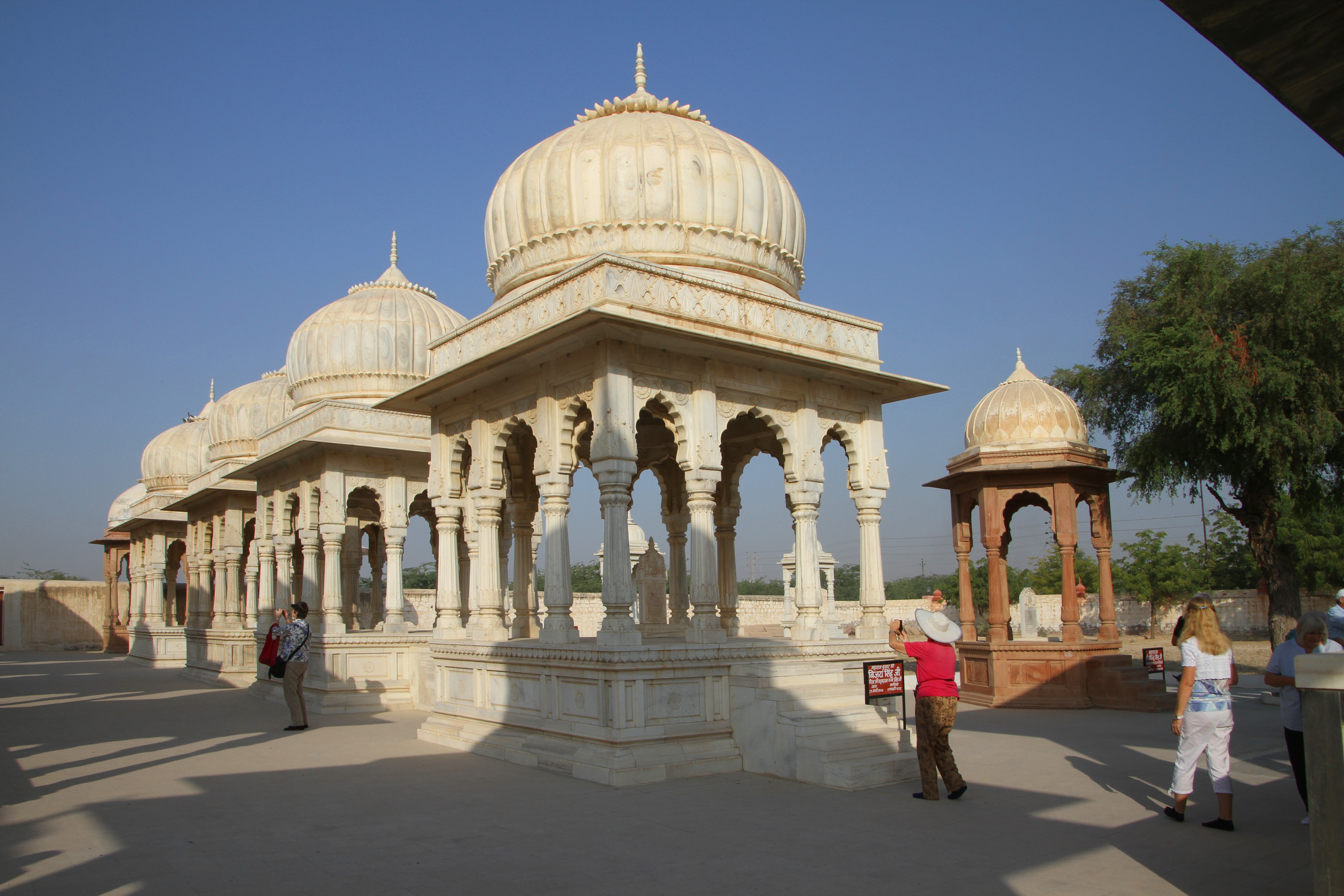
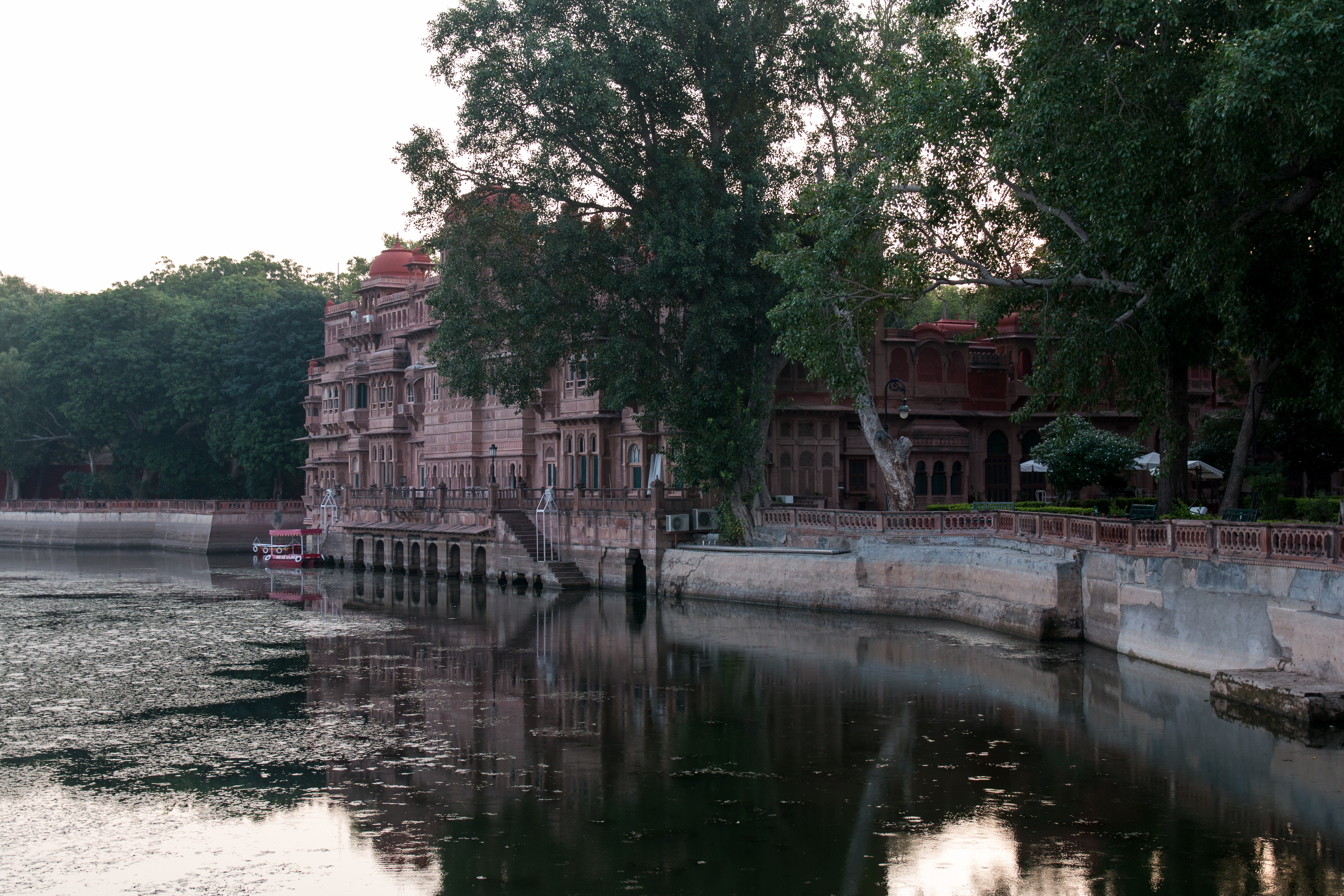
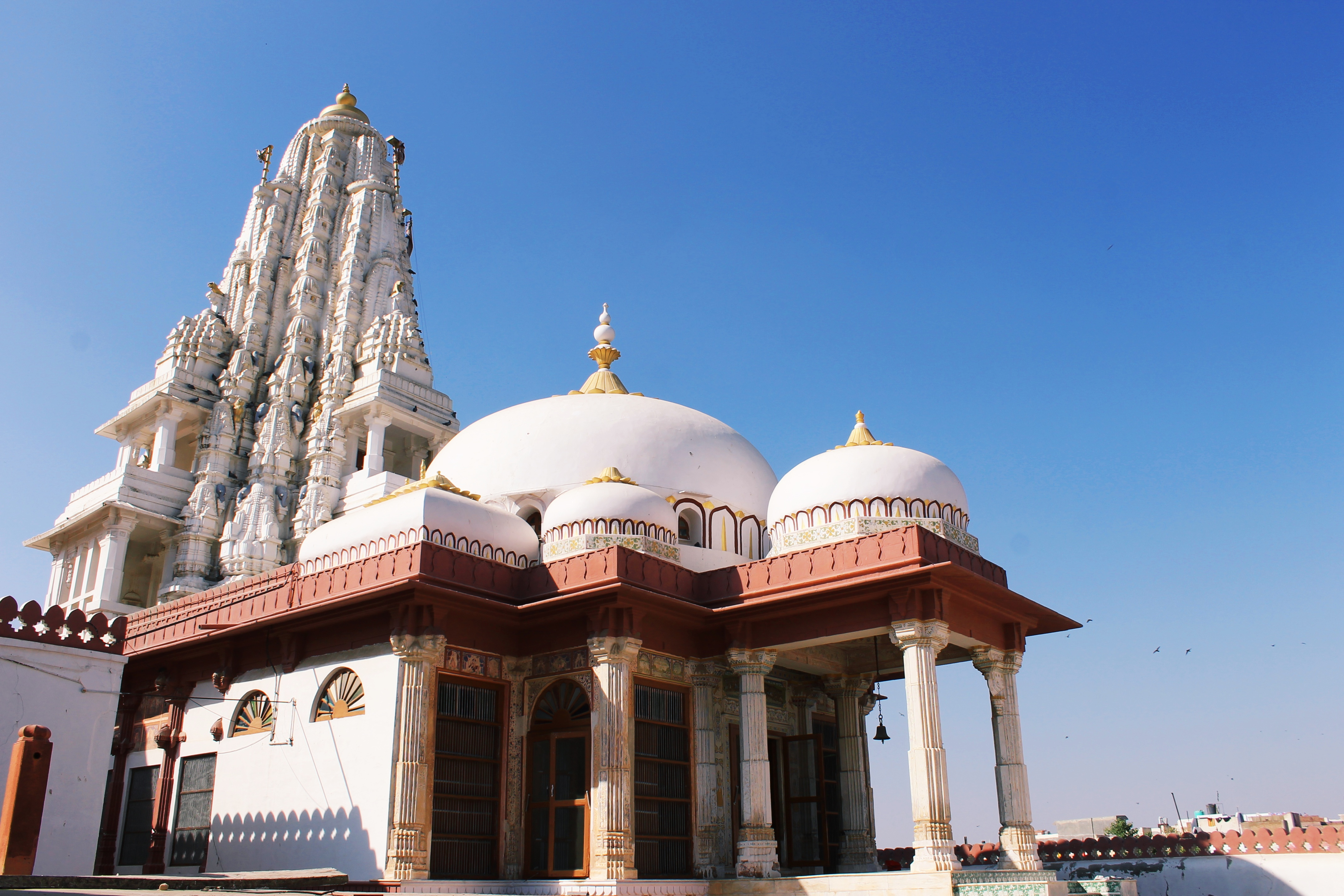
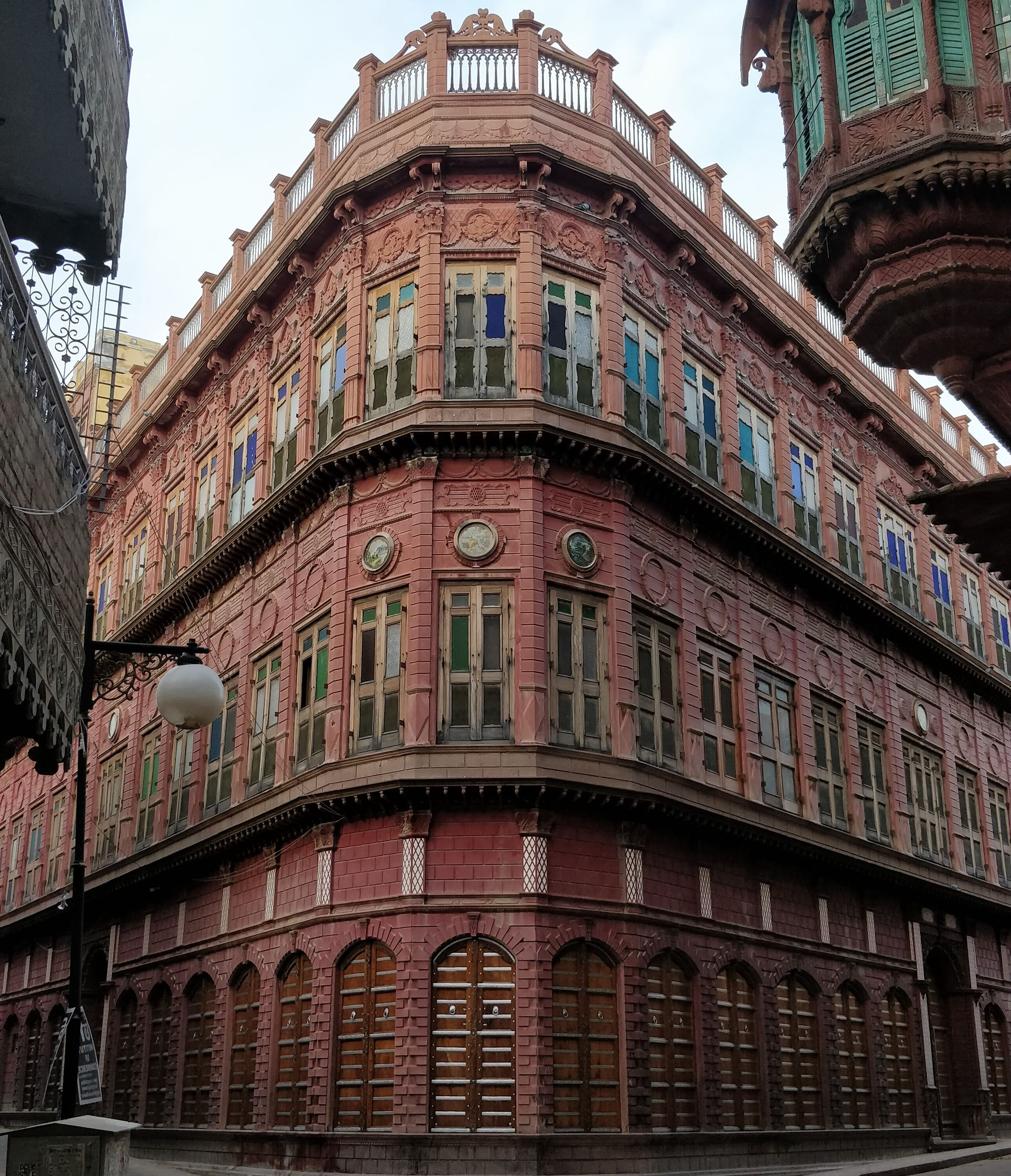
- Lalgarh Palace The Junagarh Fort Devikund Sagar Gajner Palace Bhandasar Jain Temple Rampuriya Haveli
- Nickname: The Red City
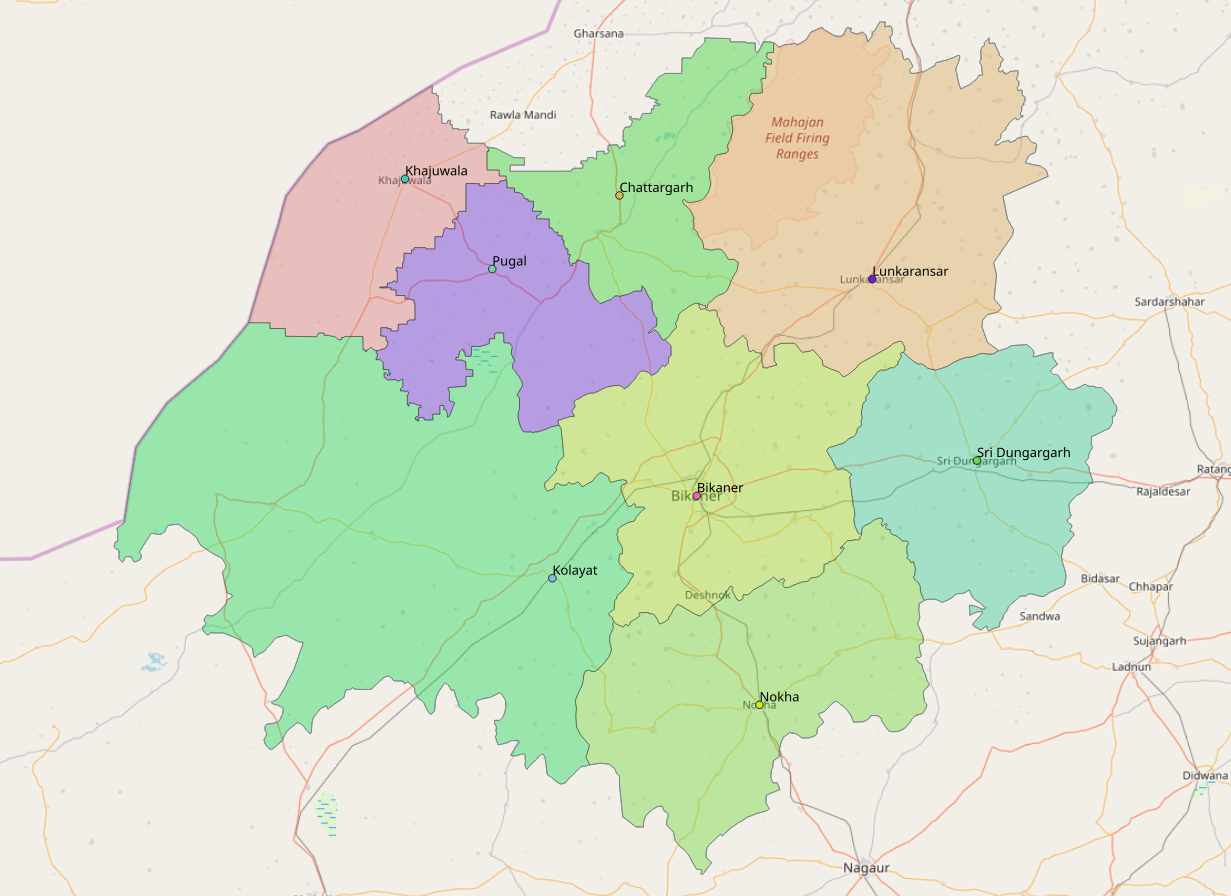
- Location within Bikaner District Location within Rajasthan Location within India
- Coordinates: 28°01′00″N 73°18′43″E
- Country: India
- State: Rajasthan
- District: Bikaner
- Established: 1488; 538 years ago
- Founder: Rao Bika
- Named for: Rao Bika

Government
  - Type: Mayor–Council
  - Body: Bikaner Municipal Corporation; Bikaner Development Authority; UIT BIKANER
  - Mayor: Sushila Kanwar (BJP)
  - Municipal Commissioner: Namrata Vrishni, IAS

Area
  - Total: 270 km^{2} (100 sq mi)
- Elevation: 242 m (794 ft)

Population (2011)
  - Total: 644,406
  - Density: 2,400/km^{2} (6,200/sq mi)
- Demonym: Bikaneri

Language
  - Official: Hindi
  - Additional official: English
  - Regional: Marwari (Rajasthani)
- Time zone: UTC+5:30 (IST)
- PIN: 3340XX
- Telephone code: +91 151 / 0151
- Vehicle registration: RJ-07
- Airport: Bikaner Airport
- Website: Bikaner Municipal Corporation; Bikaner District

Bikaner (IPA: [biːkaːneːɾ]) is a city in the Indian state of Rajasthan. It is situated approximately 330 kilometres (205 mi) northwest of the state capital Jaipur, in the Thar Desert region of western Rajasthan. Bikaner serves as the administrative headquarters of Bikaner District and Bikaner division. Formerly the capital of the princely Bikaner State, the city was founded in 1488 CE by Rao Bika, a Rajput chief of the Rathore dynasty. From its small origins it has developed into the fourth largest city in Rajasthan. The Ganga Canal, completed in 1928, and the Indira Gandhi Canal completed in 1987, facilitated its development.

== Etymology ==
The name "Bikaner" is a combination of two elements: "Bika", derived from the city's founder, Rao Bika and "Ner", which is believed to mean "place" or "city" in the local Rajasthani language. Hence, "Bikaner" translates to "the city of Bika".

== History ==
Prior to the mid 15th century, the region that is now Bikaner was a barren wilderness called Jangladesh.

Rao Bika established the city of Bikaner in 1488. He was the first son of Maharaja Rao Jodha of the Rathore clan, the founder of Jodhpur and conquered the largely arid country in the north of Rajasthan. As the first son of Jodha he wanted to have his own kingdom, not inheriting Jodhpur from his father or the title of Maharaja. He therefore decided to build his own kingdom in what is now the state of Bikaner, in the area of Jangladesh. Though it was in the Thar Desert, Bikaner was considered an oasis on the trade route between Central Asia and the Gujarat coast as it had adequate spring water. Bika's name was attached to the city he built and to the state of Bikaner ("the settlement of Bika") that he established. Bika built a fort in 1478, which is now in ruins, and a hundred years later a new fort was built about 1.5 km from the city centre, known as the Junagarh Fort.

Around a century after Rao Bika founded Bikaner, the state's fortunes flourished under the sixth Raja, Rai Singhji, who ruled from 1571 to 1611. During the Mughal Empire's rule in the country, Raja Rai Singh accepted the suzerainty of the Mughals and held a high rank as an army general at the court of the Emperor Akbar and his son, the Emperor Jahangir. Rai Singh's successful military exploits, which involved winning half of Mewar kingdom for the Empire, won him accolades and rewards from the Mughal emperors. He was given the jagirs (lands) of Gujarat and Burhanpur. With the large revenue earned from these jagirs, he built the Chintamani Durg (Junagarh fort) on a plain that has an average elevation of 760 feet (230 m). He was an expert in arts and architecture, and the knowledge he acquired during his visits abroad is amply reflected in the numerous monuments he built at the Junagarh fort.

Maharaja Karan Singh, who ruled from 1631 to 1639, under the suzerainty of the Mughals, built the Karan Mahal palace. Later rulers added more floors and decorations to this Mahal. Anup Singh, who ruled from 1669 to 1698, made substantial additions to the fort complex, including new palaces and the Zenana quarter, a royal dwelling for women and children. He refurbished the Karan Mahal with a Diwan-i-Am (public audience hall) and called it the Anup Mahal. Maharaja Gaj Singh, who ruled from 1746 to 1787 refurbished the Chandra Mahal (the Moon Palace).

During the 18th century, there was an internecine war between the rulers of Bikaner and Jodhpur and also among other thakurs, which was put down by British troops.

Following Maharaja Gaj Singh, Maharaja Surat Singh ruled from 1787 to 1828 and lavishly decorated the audience hall (see illustration) with glass and lively paintwork. Under a treaty of paramountcy signed in 1818, during Maharaja Surat Singh's reign, Bikaner came under the suzerainty of the British, after which the Maharajas of Bikaner invested heavily in refurbishing Junagarh fort.

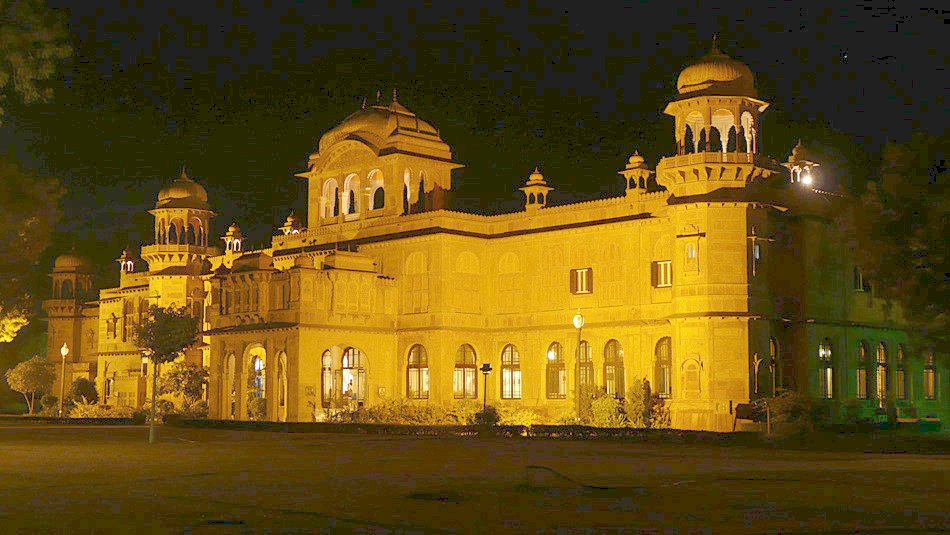
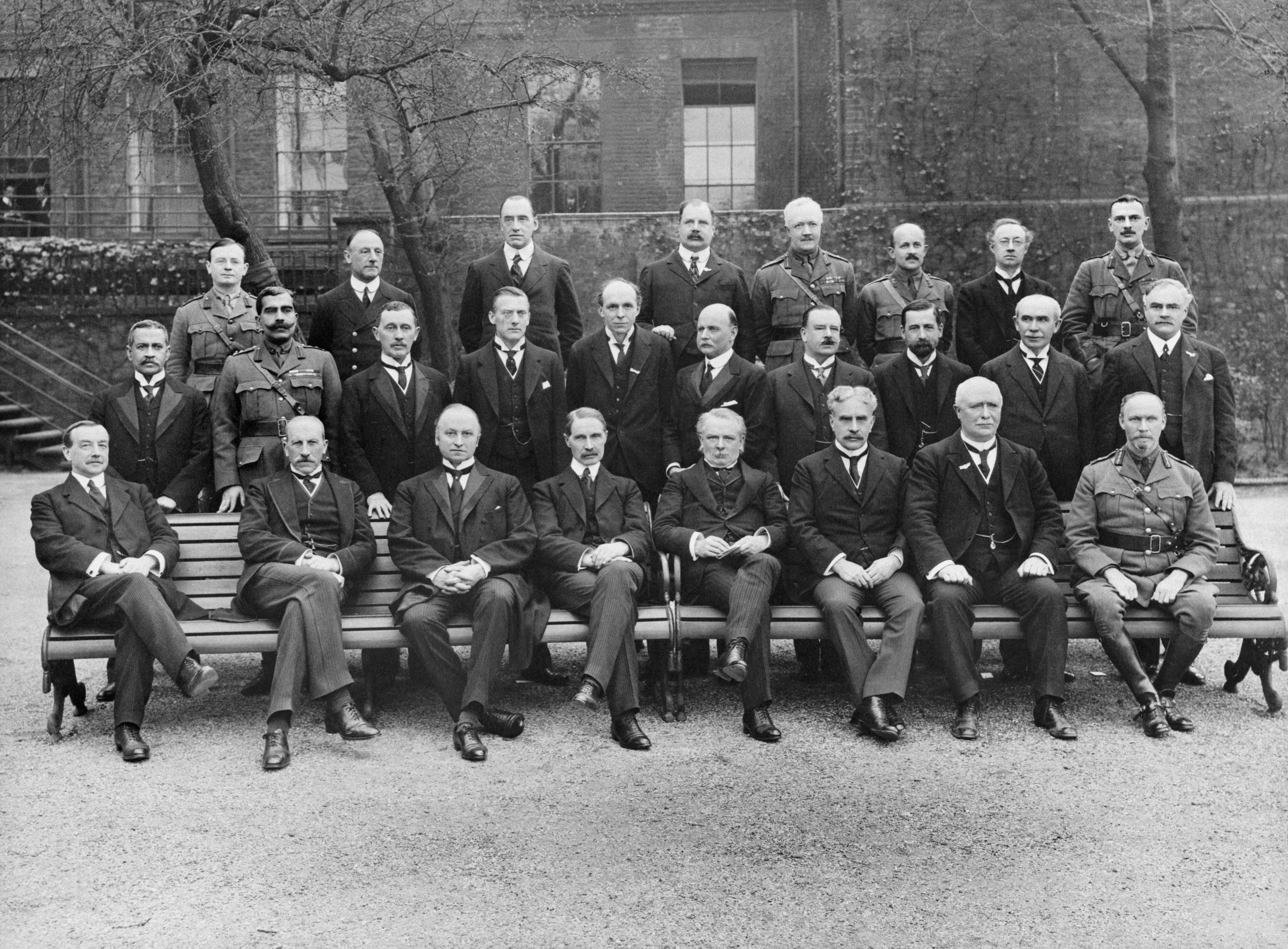
Left: Lalgarh Palace, built (Indo-Saracenic style) for Maharaja Ganga Singh and named after his father, presently a heritage hotel and also a residence of the Bikaner Royal Family. Right: Ganga Singh as a member of the Imperial War Cabinet at No. 10 Downing Street, 1917.

Dungar Singh, who reigned from 1872 to 1887, built the Badal Mahal, the 'weather palace', so named in view of a painting of clouds and falling rain, a rare event in arid Bikaner.

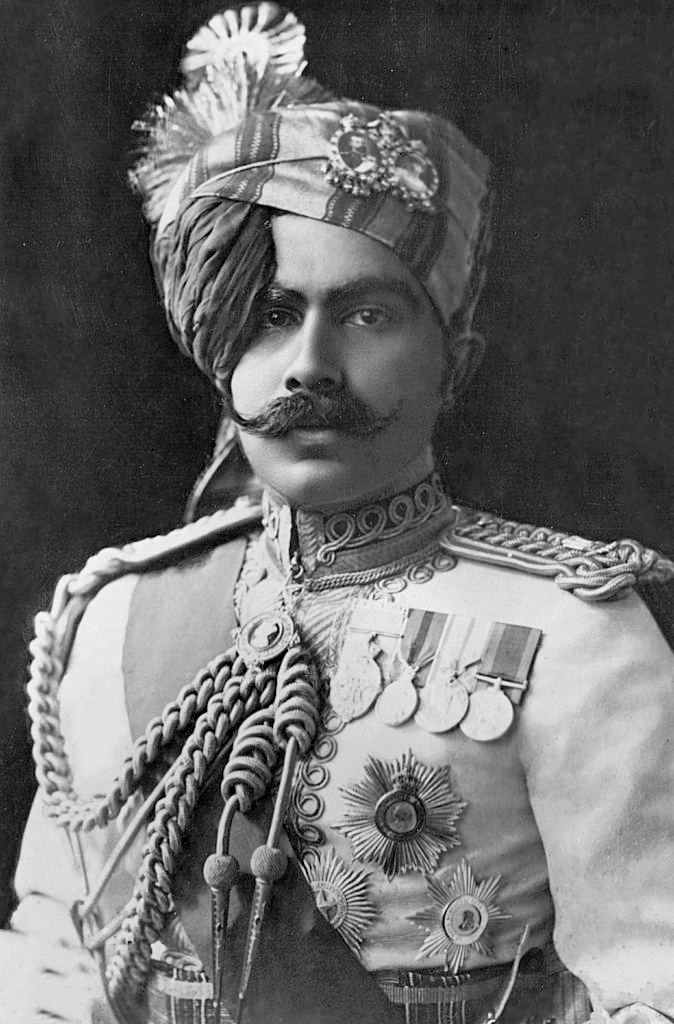
The Maharajah Ganga Singh of Bikaner (1880–1943)

General Maharaja Ganga Singh, who ruled from 1887 to 1943, was the best-known of the Rajasthan princes and was a favourite of the British Viceroys of India. He was appointed a Knight Commander of the Order of the Star of India, served as a member of the Imperial War Cabinet, represented India at the Imperial Conferences during the First World War and the British Empire at the Versailles Peace Conference. His contribution to the building activity in Junagarh involved separate halls for public and private audiences in the Ganga Mahal and a durbar hall for formal functions. He also built the Ganga Niwas Palace, which has towers at the entrance patio. This palace was designed by Sir Samuel Swinton Jacob, the third of the new palaces built in Bikaner. He named the building Lalgarh Palace in honour of his father, and moved his main residence there from Junagarh Fort in 1902. The hall where he held his Golden Jubilee (in 1938) as Bikaner's ruler is now a museum.

Ganga Singh's son, Lieutenant-General Sir Sadul Singh, the Yuvaraja of Bikaner, succeeded his father as Maharaja in 1943, but acceded his state to the Union of India in 1949. Maharaja Sadul Singh died in 1950, being succeeded in the title by his son, Karni Singh (1924–1988). The royal family of Bikaner still lives in a suite in Lalgarh Palace, which they have converted into a heritage hotel.

== Geography ==
=== Climate ===
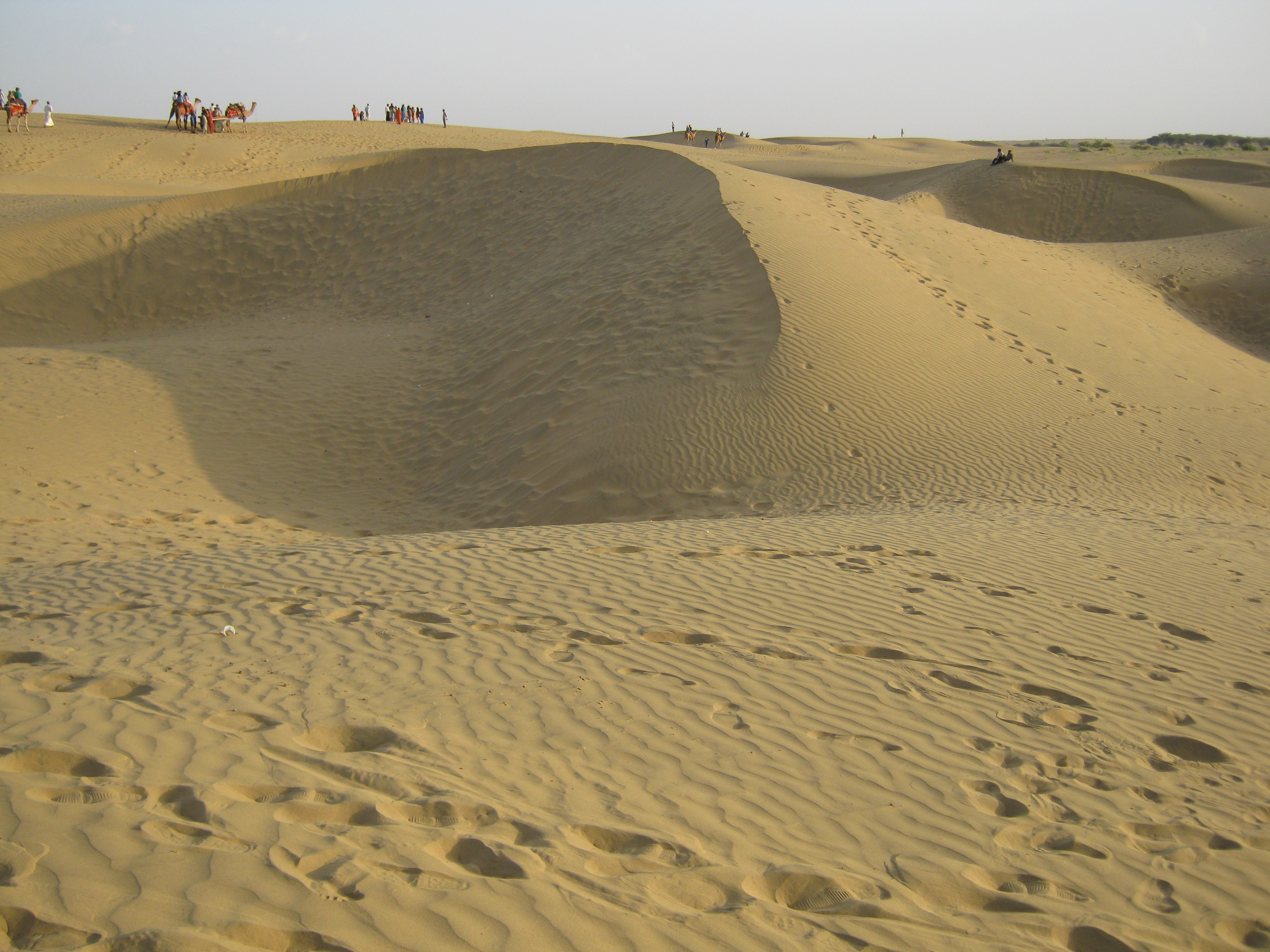
Sand dunes near Bikaner, Rajasthan.

Bikaner is situated in the middle of the Thar Desert and has a hot desert climate (Köppen climate classification BWh), with very infrequent monsoonal rainfall and extreme temperatures. In summer temperatures can exceed 48 °C or 118.4 °F, and during the winter they may dip below freezing.

The climate in Bikaner is characterised by significant variations in temperature. In the summer season it is very hot when the temperatures lie in the range of 28–53.5 °C (82.4–128.3 °F). In the winter, it is fairly cold with temperatures lying in the range of −4–23.2 °C (24.8–73.8 °F). Annual rainfall is around 290 millimetres or 11.4 inches, but occurs on a handful of days and even in these rain falls for an average total of fewer than thirty hours each year. Rainfall is also confined almost entirely to the monsoon from June to September and is extremely variable from year to year: only 29 millimetres or 1.14 inches fell in 1899, but as much as 770.9 millimetres or 30.35 inches in 1945. The highest ever temperature recorded is 49.5 °C (121.1 °F) on 19 May 2016 and lowest ever recorded is −4.0 °C (24.8 °F) on 26 January 1964.

Climate data for Bikaner (1991–2020, extremes 1901–2020)
Month	Jan	Feb	Mar	Apr	May	Jun	Jul	Aug	Sep	Oct	Nov	Dec	Year
Record high °C (°F)	32.9 (91.2)	37.2 (99.0)	42.8 (109.0)	47.2 (117.0)	49.4 (120.9)	48.9 (120.0)	47.8 (118.0)	43.4 (110.1)	43.9 (111.0)	42.2 (108.0)	38.5 (101.3)	33.8 (92.8)	49.4 (120.9)
Mean daily maximum °C (°F)	23.1 (73.6)	26.9 (80.4)	32.8 (91.0)	38.5 (101.3)	42.2 (108.0)	41.7 (107.1)	38.8 (101.8)	37.2 (99.0)	37.3 (99.1)	36.2 (97.2)	31.2 (88.2)	26.0 (78.8)	34.3 (93.7)
Daily mean °C (°F)	15.4 (59.7)	19.3 (66.7)	25.2 (77.4)	31.0 (87.8)	35.1 (95.2)	35.6 (96.1)	33.8 (92.8)	32.1 (89.8)	31.5 (88.7)	28.6 (83.5)	22.7 (72.9)	17.3 (63.1)	27.3 (81.1)
Mean daily minimum °C (°F)	7.7 (45.9)	11.6 (52.9)	17.4 (63.3)	23.1 (73.6)	27.7 (81.9)	29.4 (84.9)	28.5 (83.3)	27.2 (81.0)	25.6 (78.1)	20.8 (69.4)	14.4 (57.9)	9.2 (48.6)	20.3 (68.5)
Record low °C (°F)	−4.0 (24.8)	−2.5 (27.5)	−0.6 (30.9)	8.3 (46.9)	13.7 (56.7)	17.8 (64.0)	20.5 (68.9)	20.6 (69.1)	16.5 (61.7)	7.6 (45.7)	0.6 (33.1)	−2.8 (27.0)	−4.0 (24.8)
Average rainfall mm (inches)	4.9 (0.19)	7.7 (0.30)	8.0 (0.31)	7.9 (0.31)	23.7 (0.93)	36.9 (1.45)	90.5 (3.56)	56.9 (2.24)	32.2 (1.27)	13.1 (0.52)	1.2 (0.05)	2.9 (0.11)	285.9 (11.26)
Average rainy days	0.5	0.9	0.8	1.2	1.6	2.6	4.5	3.6	2.0	0.6	0.2	0.3	18.8
Average relative humidity (%) (at 17:30 IST)	35	27	20	16	17	28	45	48	40	27	31	36	31
Average dew point °C (°F)	3 (37)	5 (41)	7 (45)	9 (48)	13 (55)	19 (66)	23 (73)	23 (73)	20 (68)	12 (54)	8 (46)	5 (41)	12 (54)
Average ultraviolet index	5	6	7	9	9	9	8	8	8	7	6	4	7
Source 1: India Meteorological Department Time and Date (dewpoints, 2005-2015)
Source 2: Tokyo Climate Center (mean temperatures 1991–2020) Weather Atlas

=== Wildlife ===
A variety of birds, mammals and reptiles live in Bikaner's semi-arid climate. Initiatives are being taken to bring back the number of vultures which have dwindled. There are around 600 resident vultures at Jorbeer. The region is host to another 1,200 migratory vultures. Local varieties include Egyptian and King Vultures. The most common migratory vulture is Eurasian Griffon coming from Spain and Turkey. Other migratory vultures include Cinereous and Himalayan Griffons.

Saw-scaled Viper is also native to Bikaner.

Gajner Wildlife Sanctuary is located 32 km west of the Bikaner.

== Demographics ==
Historical population
Year	Pop.	±%
1891	56,300	—
1901	53,100	−5.7%
1911	55,800	+5.1%
1921	69,400	+24.4%
1931	85,900	+23.8%
1941	127,200	+48.1%
1951	117,100	−7.9%
1961	150,600	+28.6%
1968	186,600	+23.9%
1971	208,900	+12.0%
1981	280,400	+34.2%
1991	416,300	+48.5%
2001	529,690	+27.2%
2011	644,406	+21.7%

Religion in Bikaner City (2011)
Religion	Percent
Hinduism	78.67%
Islam	17.27%
Jainism	2.97%
Sikhism	0.73%
Other or not stated	0.36%

As of the 2011 Census of India the population of Bikaner city was 644,406 placing it in the top 70 major cities of India and 5th in Rajasthan. The female to male ratio in the city was 904/1,000. The literacy rate in the city was about 79%, male literacy being 87% and female literacy being 71%.

The majority of the population of the city follows Hinduism, with followers of Islam a large minority. The city has a substantial followers of Jainism.

Languages of Bikaner (2011)
1. Rajasthani (66.5%)
2. Hindi (22.0%)
3. Marwari (6.44%)
4. Urdu (1.94%)
5. Punjabi (1.26%)
6. Others (1.89%)

Rajasthani is the major language spoken here, while Hindi is the significant minority. There are also small communities of Marwari and Punjabi speakers residing in Bikaner.

== Administration ==
=== Municipal finance ===
The Bikaner Municipal Corporation oversees local taxation, service delivery, and financial management for the city, including budgeting and accounting. Bikaner Municipal Corporation's revenue comprises a mix of (i) own-source revenue, such as property tax, user charges, and rental income; (ii) assigned revenues (the city's share in state taxes); (iii) grants from the central and state governments.

According to data published on the CityFinance portal, maintained by the Ministry of Housing and Urban Affairs, the Bikaner Municipal Corporation's total revenue increased from ₹67 crore in 2020–21 to ₹115 crore in 2022–23, representing a 72% growth. In FY 2022-23, own-source revenue contributed approximately 17% of the city's total revenue. Key financial indicators for recent fiscal years are summarised below.

All figures are in crore rupees (₹ Cr)

Year	Total Tax Revenue	Total Own Revenue	Assigned Revenue	Total Grant	Total Revenue	Total Expenditure	Total Balance Sheet Size
2022–23	3	15	95.5	0.61	115	99	295
2021–22	2	9	59.71	–	72	96	285
2020–21	3	7	54.28	0.11	67	71	294

Source: Data submitted by the Bikaner Municipal Corporation and available under the Balance Sheet and Income Statement sections on the CityFinance portal of the Ministry of Housing and Urban Affairs.

== Cuisine ==
The city is famous for its savoury snack Bikaneri bhujia and also have geographical indication (GI) tag to keep its originality intact. Other special food items for which Bikaner is well known are Bajre ki Roti (Chapati made up of Pearl millet flour), Dal baati Churma, Ghevar, Halvas, Papads/Papadum, Rasgulla, Gulab Jamun, Kachori and Samosa.

Haldiram's, a multinational snacks and sweets company was founded by Ganga Bishan Agarwal of Bikaner. The Agarwal family also own other brands like Bikaji, Bikanervala, Bikano and Prabhuji.

== Places of interest ==
=== Junagarh Fort ===
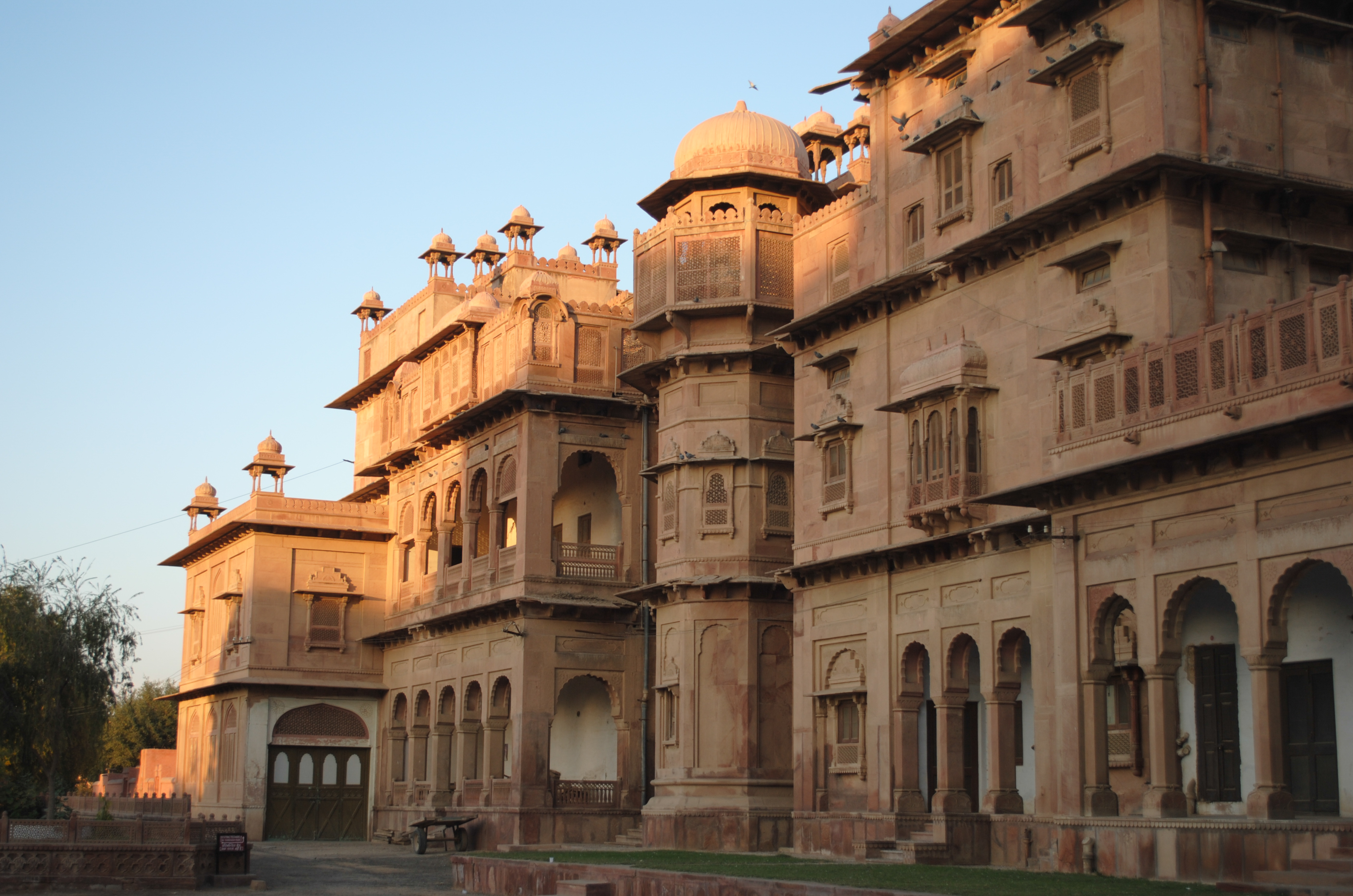
Junagarh Fort

The Junagarh Fort was built around 1594 CE by Raja Rai Singh. The fort was originally called Chintamani. It is one of the few major forts in Rajasthan which was not built on hilly terrain. The modern city of Bikaner has developed around the fort. The fort is studded with temples, grand palaces and huge pavilions and walls. In 1961, a museum was set up by Maharaja Karni Singh. Its temples and palaces are preserved as museums and provide insight into the grandiose living style of the past Maharanas of Rajasthan.

=== Lalgarh Palace ===
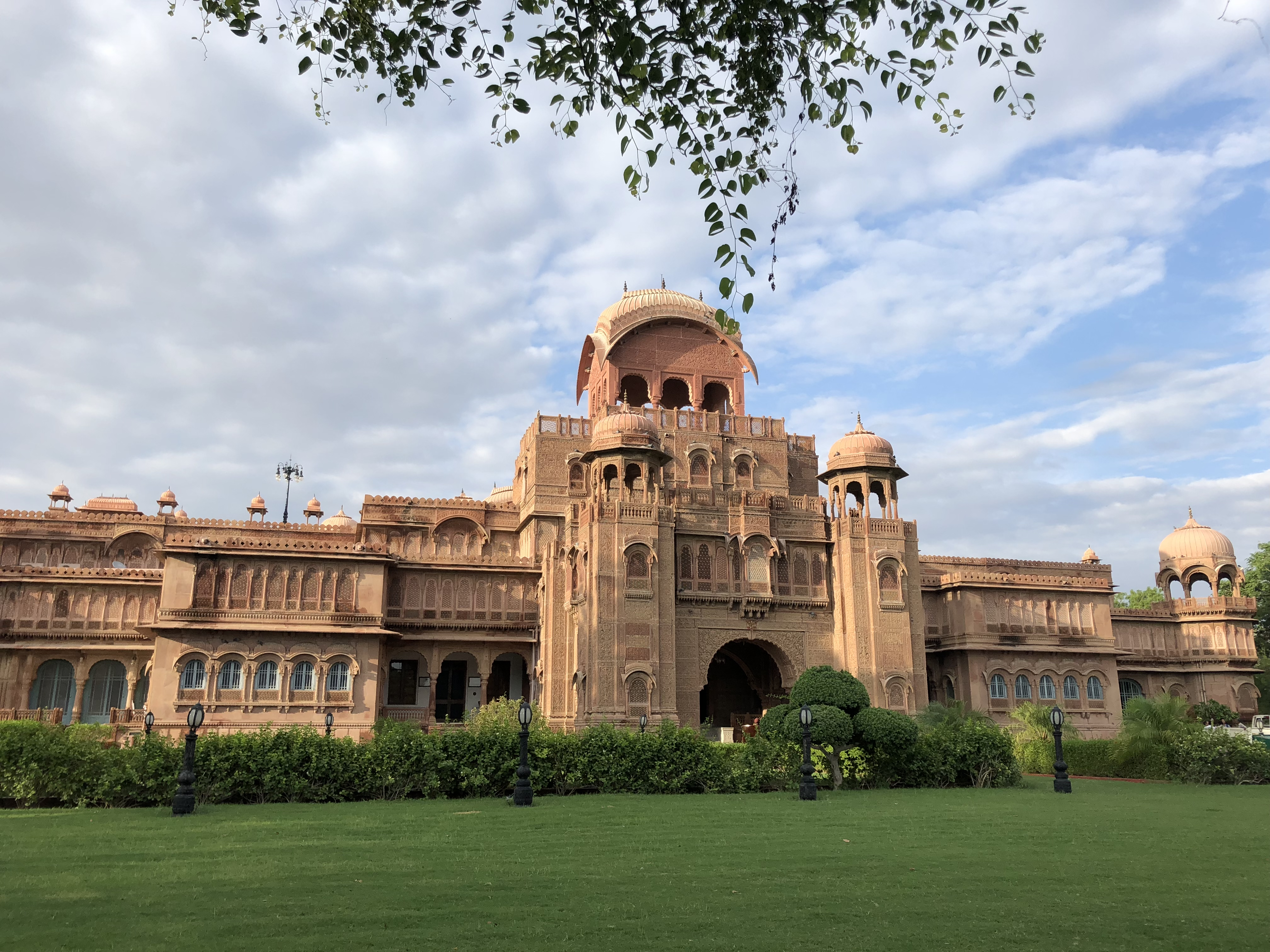
The Lalgarh Palace

The Lalgarh Palace is a former residential palace built by Maharajah Ganga Singh, the ruler of the former state of Bikaner. It was designed by the British architect, Samuel Swinton Jacob in the year 1902. The style of architecture is Indo-Saracenic. It is now a luxury Heritage hotel owned by the royal family of Bikaner.

=== Camel Festival ===
The Bikaner Camel Festival is an annual celebration organised by the Department of Tourism, Government of Rajasthan. The festival begins with a procession of decorated camels from Junagarh Fort and continues with cultural events and competitions at Dr. Karni Singh Stadium in Bikaner.

=== Rao Bikaji's Fort ===
Rao Bikaji's first fort, 'Bikaji Ki Tekri' built in 1478 is now in ruins. A hundred years later a new fort was built about 1.5 km from the city centre, named Junagarh Fort.

=== Karni Mata Temple ===
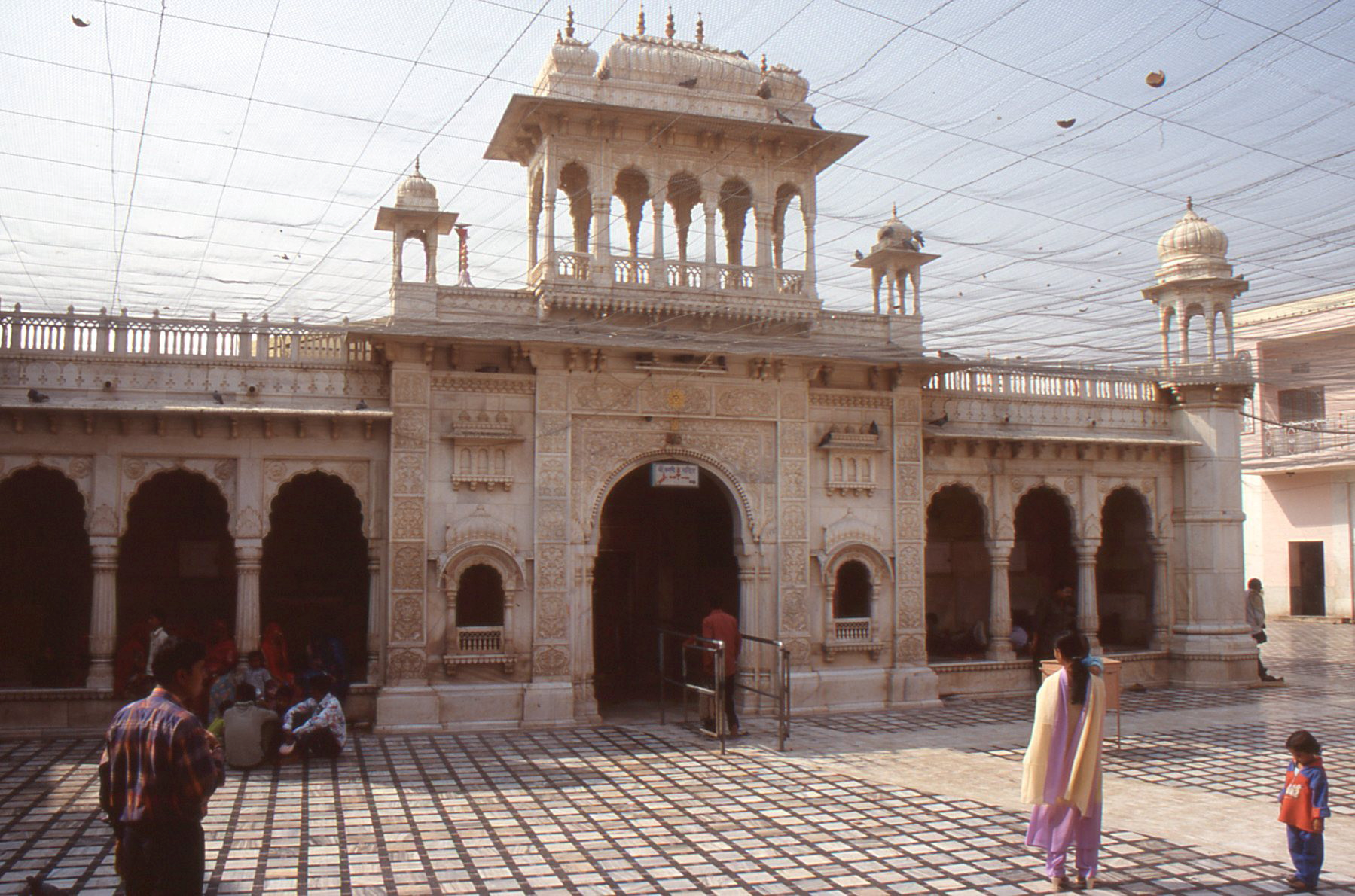
Karni Mata Temple of Deshnoke (Bikaner)

The Karni Mata (करणी माता) Temple or the Rat Temple of Rajasthan is situated around 30 km away from the Bikaner city and is dedicated to goddess Karni Mata, a famous mystic of her times, believed to be an incarnation of goddess Durga. The locals will be quick to point out that the creatures running around in the temple are not rats, they are kaaba. Kaabas are believed to be reincarnations of humans who had been devotees of Karni Mata, and the brevity of human life did not sufficiently satisfy their devotion.

The shrine of Karni Mata can be found in the town of Deshnoke 30 km south from Bikaner on the road to Jodhpur. Karni Mata is worshiped as an incarnation of Goddess Durga.

=== Mukam Bishnoi Temple ===
Mukam Temple, also known as Mukti Dham Mukam, is a religious site located near Nokha in the Bikaner district of Rajasthan, India. It is considered the principal pilgrimage center of the Bishnoi community, a sect founded in the 15th century by Guru Jambheshwar, also known as Jambhoji. Followers of the Bishnoi faith adhere to 29 principles that promote environmental conservation and compassion towards all living beings. The temple is built over the samadhi (final resting place) of Guru Jambheshwar and holds significant cultural and spiritual importance for Bishnois across the region.

=== Laxminath Temple ===
Built by Maharaja Rao Lunkaran, Shri Laxminath Temple is one of the oldest temples in Bikaner and 4 kilometres from Junagarh Fort. Lord Vishnu and Goddess Laxmi. The artwork inside the temple apart from the shrines is the doorway which is embellished in silver work. Festivals like Janmashtmi, Nirjala Ekadashi, Rama Navami, Diwali and Gita Jayanti are majorly celebrated at the temple.

=== Bhandasar Jain Temple ===
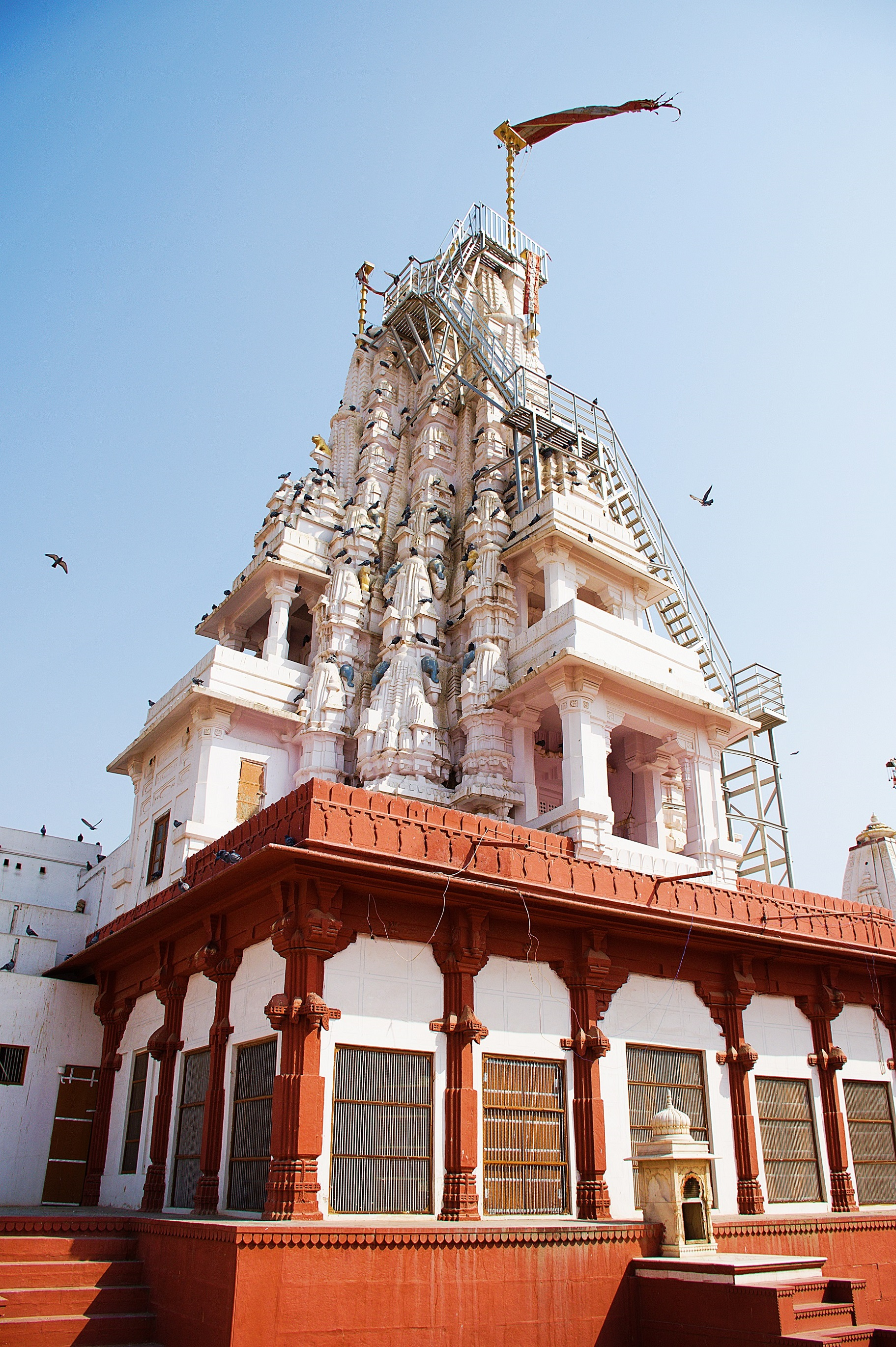
Bhandasar Jain Temple

Bhandasar Jain Temple is known for its beautiful leaf paintings, frescoes and ornamented mirror work. This temple was constructed by Bhandasa Oswal in the 15th century. This temple is constructed using red sandstone with paintings on walls and pillars of the sanctum and mandapa. The temple is dedicated to the 5th Tirthankara sumatinatha. The temple consist of garbhagriha, antarala, mahamandapa and ardhamandapa.

== Fairs and festivals ==
=== International Camel Festival ===
International Camel Festival is held every year in January or February. Organised by the Department of Tourism, Art and Culture, the city celebrates the festival in honour of camels.

Competitions like Mr Bikana and Miss Marwan are also held during the festival.

== Animal husbandry ==
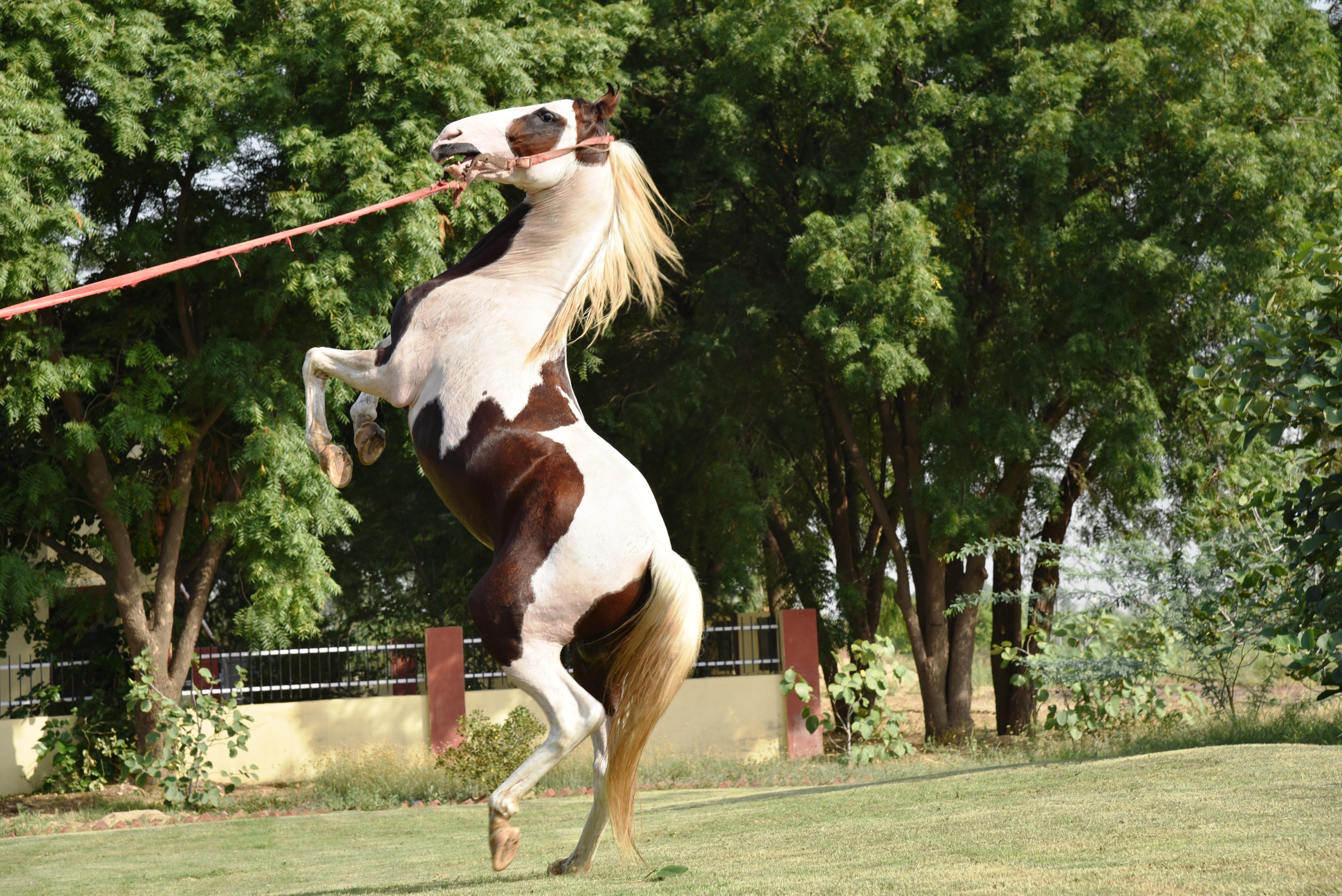
National Research Centre on Equines

=== National Research Centre on Camels, Bikaner ===
National Research Centre on Camels was established in 1984 in Bikaner by the Government of India under Indian Council of Agricultural Research at the outskirts of Bikaner city to promote research and development related to camels such as effective breeding, utilisation of camel milk, etc. Scientists engage with all stakeholders like camel herders, traders via collaborative programmes and significant growth had been made. A camel museum is available to apprise them of the developmental and research aspects of the camel in the desert ecosystem. Maharaja Ganga Singh of the Indian State of Bikaner founded Bikaner Camel Corps around 1890 and became a part of the BSF in Independent India.

=== Cow sanctuary ===
The Rajasthan government has decided to set up its first cow sanctuary in Bikaner. It has a dedicated Ministry of Cow Husbandry. The sanctuary is likely to be set up near Amarpura village, about 70 km from Bikaner.

== Transport ==
Bikaner railway station is a major railway junction in the North Western Railway zone of Indian Railways. The first railway link to Bikaner was established on 9 December 1891 as part of Jodhpur State Railway and it has undergone many administrative modifications since then.

Bikaner Railway Station is well connected to National Capital Delhi and Rajasthan State's capital Jaipur along with major Indian cities.

Bikaner is well served with roads and is linked directly to Delhi and other major cities.

Central Bus Stand is the main bus station in Bikaner. It connects Bikaner to other cities in Rajasthan and nearby states via road.

Bikaner has Domestic Civil Airport Nal Airport which is located 15 km west of the city. Regular flights to Jaipur JAI and Delhi DEL commenced in 2017-18 under UDAN scheme of the Government of India.

== Education ==
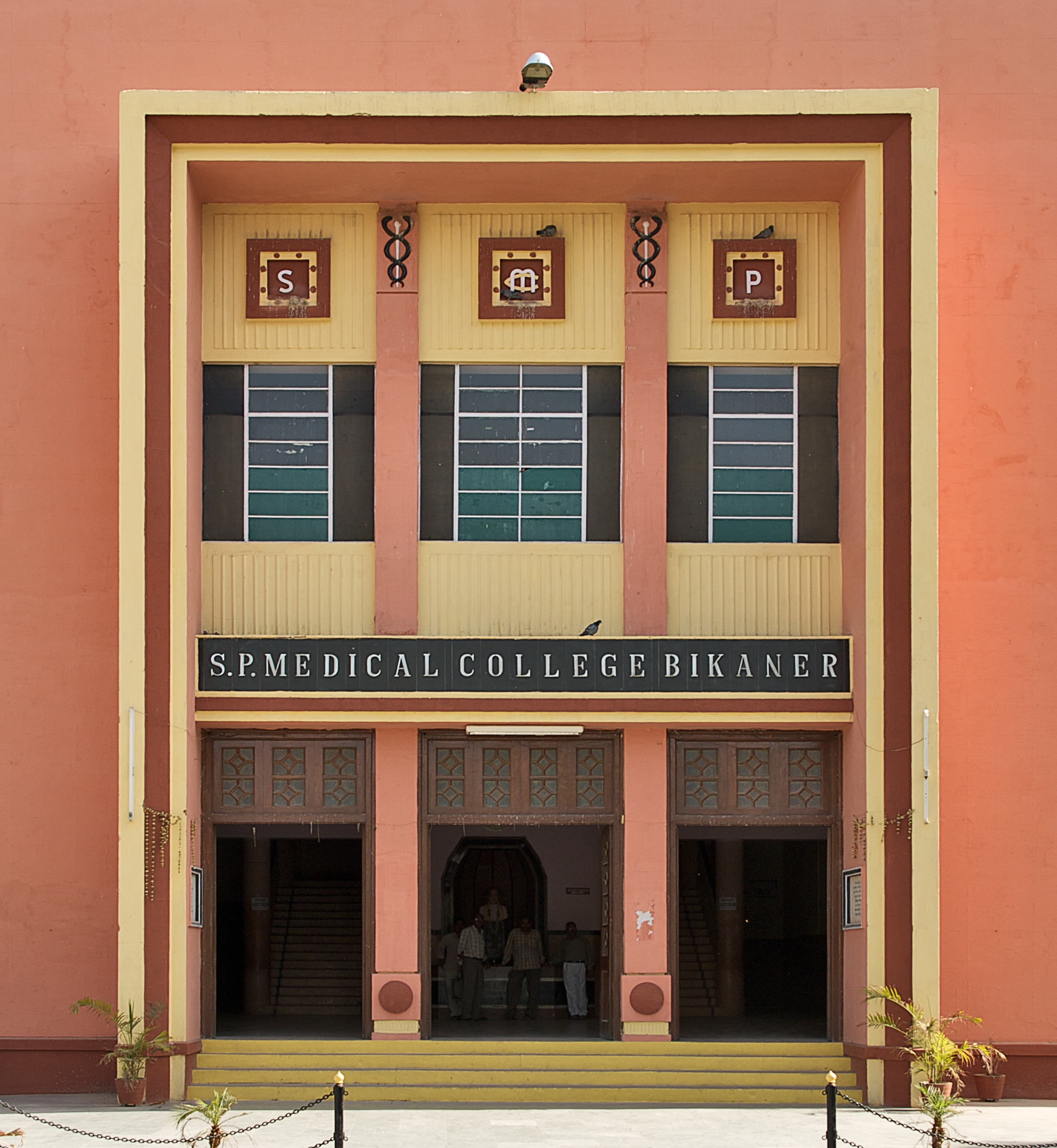
Sardar Patel Medical College, Bikaner

Notable eEducational institutes located in Bikaner are: Dungar College, Sardar Patel Medical College, Government Engineering College Bikaner, Maharaja Ganga Singh University, Rajasthan University of Veterinary and Animal Sciences, Swami Keshwanand Rajasthan Agricultural University, and Bikaner Technical University.

== International relations ==
=== Twin towns – sister cities ===
- Kütahya, Turkey

=== Friendship ===
- Udine, Italy

== See also ==
- Magra sheep
- Bikaner State
- Malasar
- List of universities and colleges in Bikaner
- List of schools in Bikaner, Rajasthan
- Jasrasar
- Swaroopdesar
