= Sadul Singh of Bikaner =

Maharaja of Bikaner from 1943 to 1949

Maharaja Sadul Singh

Maharaja of Bikaner
- Reign: 1943–1949
- Predecessor: General Maharaja Sir Ganga Singh
- Successor: Colonel Dr Maharaja Karni Singh MP
- Born: 7 September 1902
- Died: 25 September 1950 (aged 48)
- Consort: Maharani Sudarshan Prasad Kanwarji Sahiba
- Issue: Maharani Sushila Kunwar of Udaipur; Colonel Dr Maharaja Karni Singh of Bikaner; Lt Colonel Maharaj Amar Singh of Bikaner (Chattargarh)
- Father: Ganga Singh
- Mother: Maharani Vallabh Kanwarji

Lieutenant-General Maharaja Sir Sadul Singh GCSI, GCIE, KStJ, CVO (7 September 1902 – 25 September 1950) was the last reigning Maharaja of Bikaner from 2 February 1943 to 30 March 1949, continuing as Head of the House of Bikaner and holding the title of Maharaja of Bikaner until his death.

== Biography ==
The eldest surviving son of General Sir Ganga Singh, Sir Sadul Singh had, for the thirty years leading up to his succession, been serving in many important posts for his father. He had been a Page of Honour at the coronation of King George V and had attended him at the durbar in Delhi. In 1919, Sir Sadul was present at the Paris Peace Conference and attended the 1924 meeting of the League of Nations. He served as Chief Minister of Bikaner from 1920 to 1925 and fought in the Second World War in Persia, the Middle East and Burma. As the time for Indian independence drew near, Sir Sadul was among the first princes to accede to the Dominion of India, which he did on 7 August 1947. On 30 March 1949, Sir Sadul merged Bikaner into the United State of Greater Rajasthan.

== Family ==
=== Marriage ===
He married in April 1922 Maharani Sudarshan Prasad Kanwarji Sahiba, daughter of Maharaja Venkatraman Ramanuj Prasad Singh Ju Deo of Rewa.

=== Children ===
Name	Birth	Death	Consort	Children
Sushila Kanwarji	24 April 1923	5 November 1999	Bhagwat Singh Mewar, Maharana of Udaipur-Mewar	Mahendra Singh; Trivikrama Kumari; Vishvaraj Singh; Yogeshwari Kumari, Rajmata of Sitamau; Arvind Singh; Bhargavi Kumari; Padmaja Kumari; Lakshyaraj Singh
Karni Singh	21 April 1924	4 September 1988	Maharani Sushila Kanwarji of Dungarpur, daughter of His Highness Rai-i-Rayan Mahimahendra Maharajadhiraj Maharawal Sahib Shri Sir Lakshman Singhji Bahadur of Dungapur.	Narendra Singh; Daksha Kumari; Siddhi Kumari; Mahima Kumari; Rajyashree Kumari; Madhulika Kumari
Amar Singh	11 December 1925	16 June 2009	Rani Manhar Kunverba	Ravi Raj Singh; Hemangini Kumari; Rajeshkumar Singh; Shriridhi Kumari

Siblings

Maharaja Sadul Singh had 5 siblings

- Maharajkumar Ram Singh who died at childbirth.
- Captain Maharajkumar Bijey Singh of Bikaner (Chattargarh-Anupgarh) who died at age 31 having had 3 daughters.
- Maharajkumar Vir Singh who died at the age of 1.
- Maharajkumari Chand Kanwar who died at the age of 26 having had no children.
- Maharajkumari Shiv Kanwar who later became Maharani Shiv Kanwar of Kotah, died at the age of 96 and had 3 children

Uncle's & Aunts

His Father, General Maharaja Sir Ganga Singh Ji of Bikaner had 2 elder brothers (children of Maharaj Lal Singh of Bikaner (Chattargarh-Anupgarh), both of whom passed without any children. They were:

(i) Maharaja Dungar Singh of Bikaner

(ii) Rajkumar Gulab Singh of Bikaner (Chattargarh-Anupgarh), who died as a child.

His father's second cousins were his closest paternal uncles in relation and they were:

Children of Maharaj Mukan Singh of Bikaner (Khilriya): (i) Maharaj Jaswant Singh, (ii) Maharaj Jawani Singh of Bikaner (Sherpura), (iii) Maharaj Nahar Singh of Bikaner (Ridi)

Only child of Maharaj Khet Singh of Bikaner (Tejrasar): (i) Colonel Maharaj Sir Bhairon Singh of Bikaner (Tejrasar)

He had no paternal aunts within 2 generations of his father; his closest paternal aunts would be his father's third cousins from the Haveliwale Rajvi families of Alsar, Benisar and other Haveliwale branches (Descendants of Maharajkumar Chattar Singh's Siblings: Maharaj Sultan Singh, Maharaj Devi Singh)

His closest maternal uncles and aunts were siblings of his mother Maharani Vallabh Kanwarji and children of Maharawat Sir Raghunath Singh of Pratapgarh. They were:

(i) Yuvraj Maharajkumar Pratap Singh of Pratapgarh, (ii) Yuvraj Maharajkumar Man Singh of Pratapgarh, (iii) Maharani Raj Kunwrani of Sailana & (iv) Maharaj Govardhan Singh of Pratapgarh

Cousins

- His closest cousins from the House of Bikaner were from the cadet branches of the Bikaner Royal Family and they were: via Uncle Maharaj Nahar Singh of Bikaner (Khilriyan): (i) Major Maharaj Jagmal Singh of Bikaner (Ridi), (ii) Colonel Maharaj Narayan Singh of Bikaner (Ridi), (iii) Colonel Maharaj Prithvi Singh of Bikaner (Ridi) via Uncle Colonel Maharaj Sir Bhairon Singh of Bikaner (Tejrasar): (i) Maharaj Ajit Singh of Bikaner (Tejrasar), (ii) Rajkumar Abhay Singh of Bikaner (Tejrasar), (iii) Rajkumari Chanan Kumari who became Maharani Chanan Kumari of Pratapgarh, (iv) Rajkumari Subha Kanwar who became Thakurani Subha Kanwar of Jhalai and (v) Rajkumari Kushal Kanwar.
- His maternal cousins were: Via Uncle Yuvraj Maharajkumar Man Singh of Pratapgarh: (i) Maharawat Sir Ram Singh of Pratapgarh, (ii) Rani Mohan Kumari of Sitmau, Via Uncle Maharaj Govardhan Singh of Pratapgarh: (i) Maharaj Gopal Singh of Pratapgarh (Arnod), (ii) Maharaj Bheemsinha Singh of Pratapgarh (Arnod), (iii) Thakurani Mahendra Kumari of Ras, (iv) Thakurani Shiv Kumari of Raipur, (v) Rani Hem Kanwar of Parsoli & (vi) Thakurani Isha Kanwar of Channod and also children (if any) of Maharani Raj Kunwrani of Sailana (wife of Maharaja Dileep Singh of Sailana).

== Death ==
He died in London on 25 September 1950 at the age of 48. His eldest child and only daughter became the Maharani (later Rajmata) of Mewar as she was married to Colonel Maharana Bhagwat Singh of Mewar. His eldest son, Colonel Dr Maharaja Karni Singh succeeded him as the Maharaja of Bikaner. His younger son Lt Colonel Maharaj Amar Singh succeeded Maharaja Sadul Singh's brother Captain Maharajkumar Chattar Singh as the Maharaj of Chattargarh.

Sadul Singh of Bikaner Rathore Dynasty Born: 7 September 1902 Died: 25 September 1950
Regnal titles
Preceded by Ganga Singh	Maharaja of Bikaner; 1943–1949	Succeeded by Monarchy abolished (Merge within the Republic of India)
Titles in pretence
Preceded by None	— TITULAR — Maharaja of Bikaner; 1949–50	Succeeded by Karni Singh
