= List of palaces in Rajasthan =

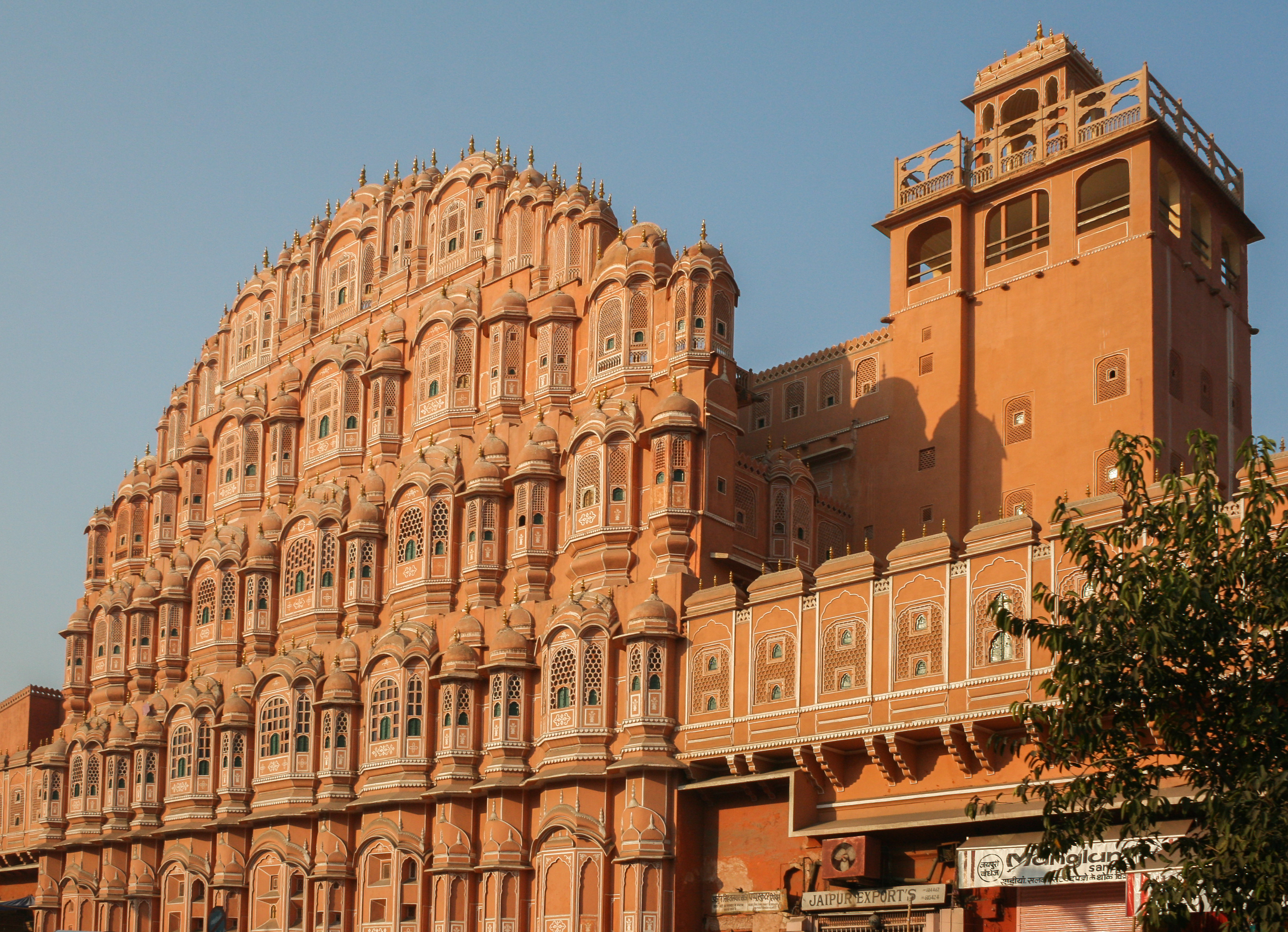
Hawa Mahal, the "Palace of Winds", in Jaipur

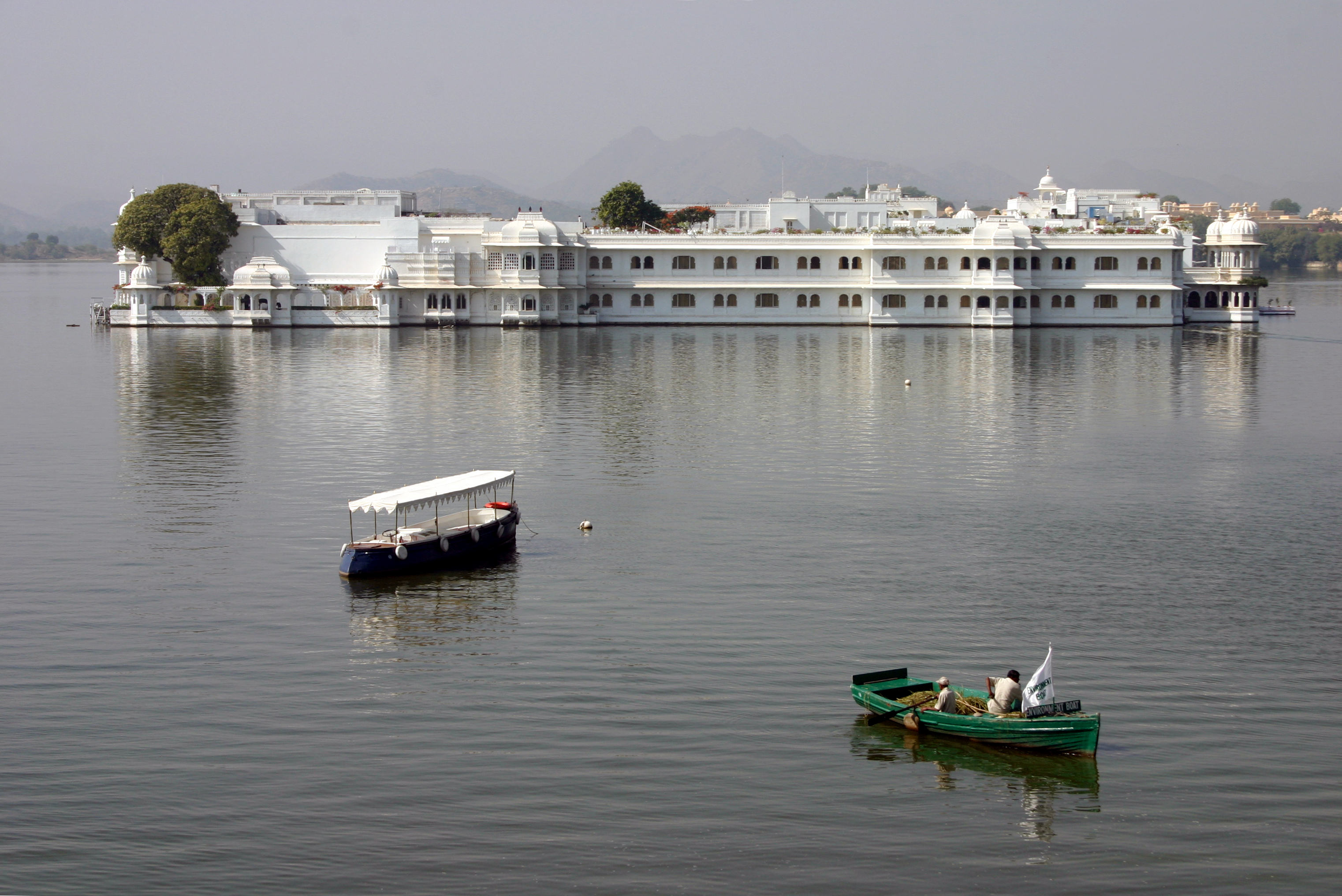
Lake palace in Udaipur

The Indian state of Rajasthan is famous for historic havelis, forts and palaces. Some of these are:

== Jaipur district ==
- Amber Palace (Amber Fort)
- Shahpura Haveli, Shahpura

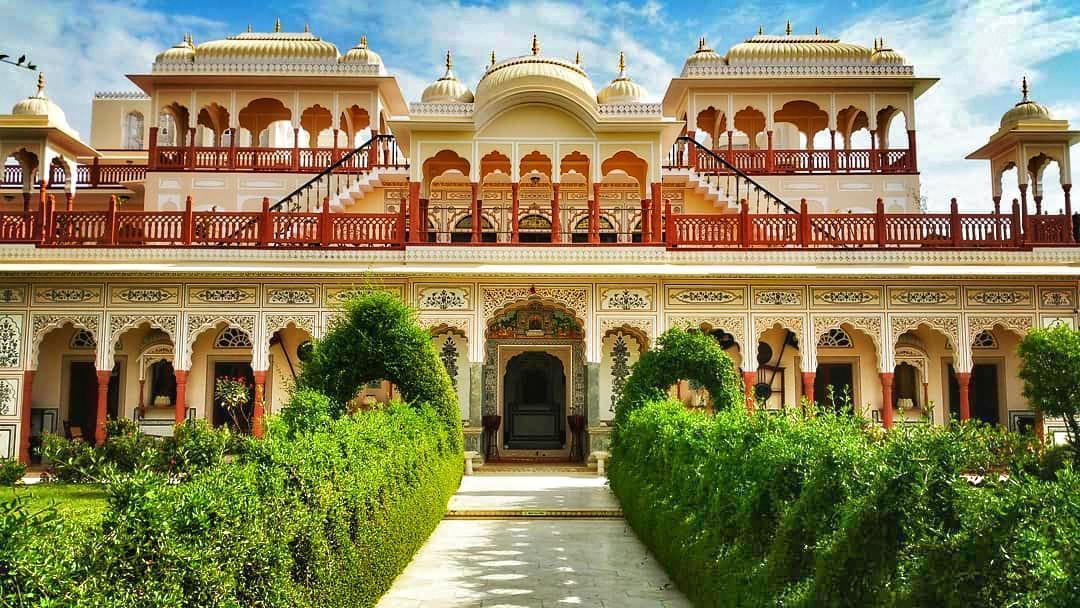
Shahpura Haveli Front Facade Picture

- Samode Palace, Jaipur
- City Palace, Jaipur
- Rambagh Palace, Jaipur
- Jal Mahal, Jaipur
- Hawa Mahal (Palace of Winds), Jaipur

== Udaipur district ==
- City Palace, Udaipur,
- Jag Niwas (Lake Palace), Udaipur
- Jag Mandir, Udaipur
- Shiv Niwas Palace, Udaipur

== Bikaner district ==
- Junagarh Fort and Palace, Bikaner
- Laxmi Niwas Palace, Bikaner
- Gajner Palace, Bikaner

== Jodhpur district ==
- Umaid Bhawan Palace, Jodhpur
- Mehrangarh Fort, Jodhpur

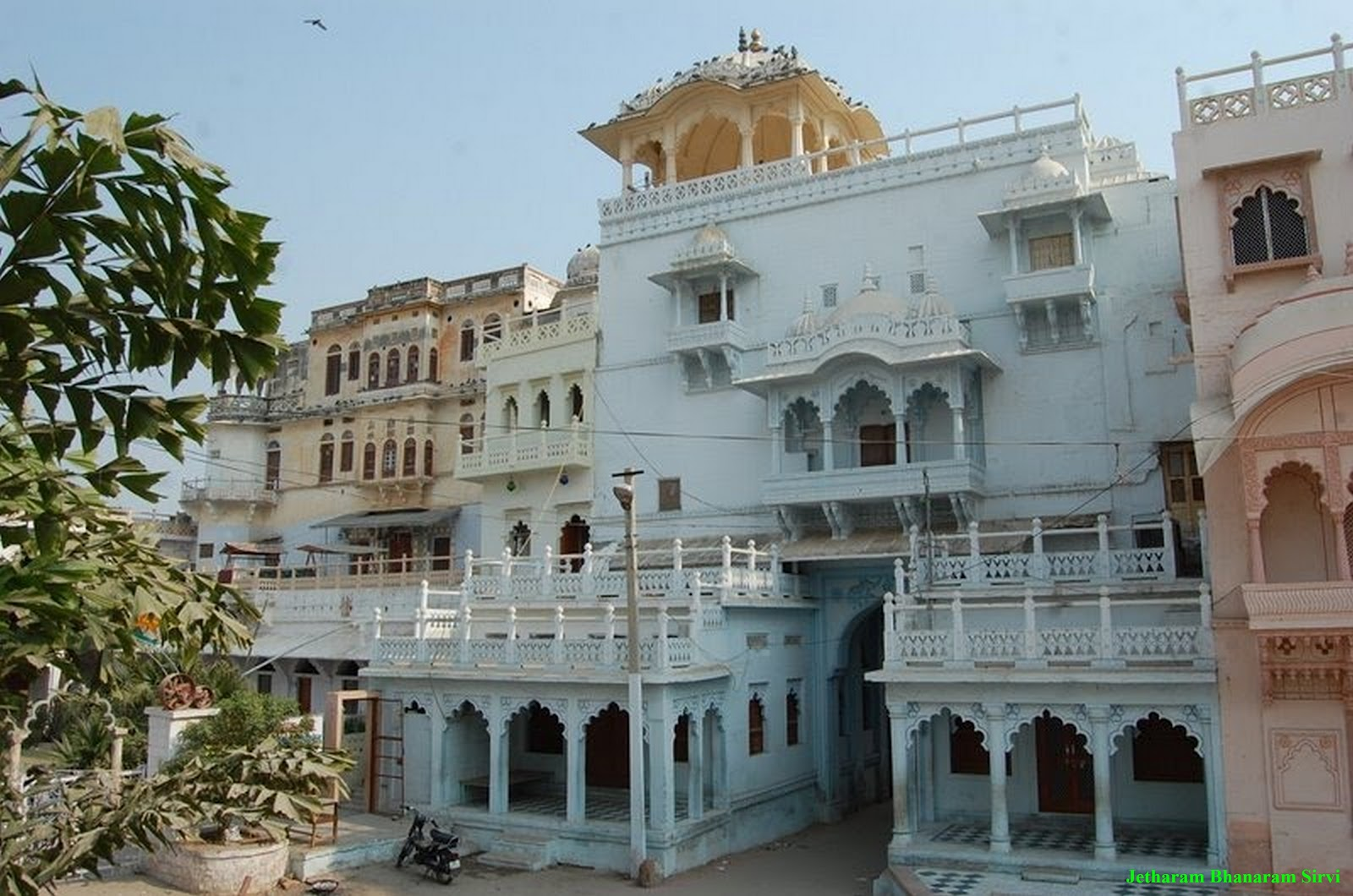
Palace of Bilara

== Other districts ==
- Devigarh, Delwara
- Khimsar Fort, Khimsar
- Jaisalmer Fort, Jaisalmer
- Lalgarh Palace, Bikaner
- Laxmangarh Fort, Sikar
- Mundota Fort and Palace
- Neemrana Fort and Palace

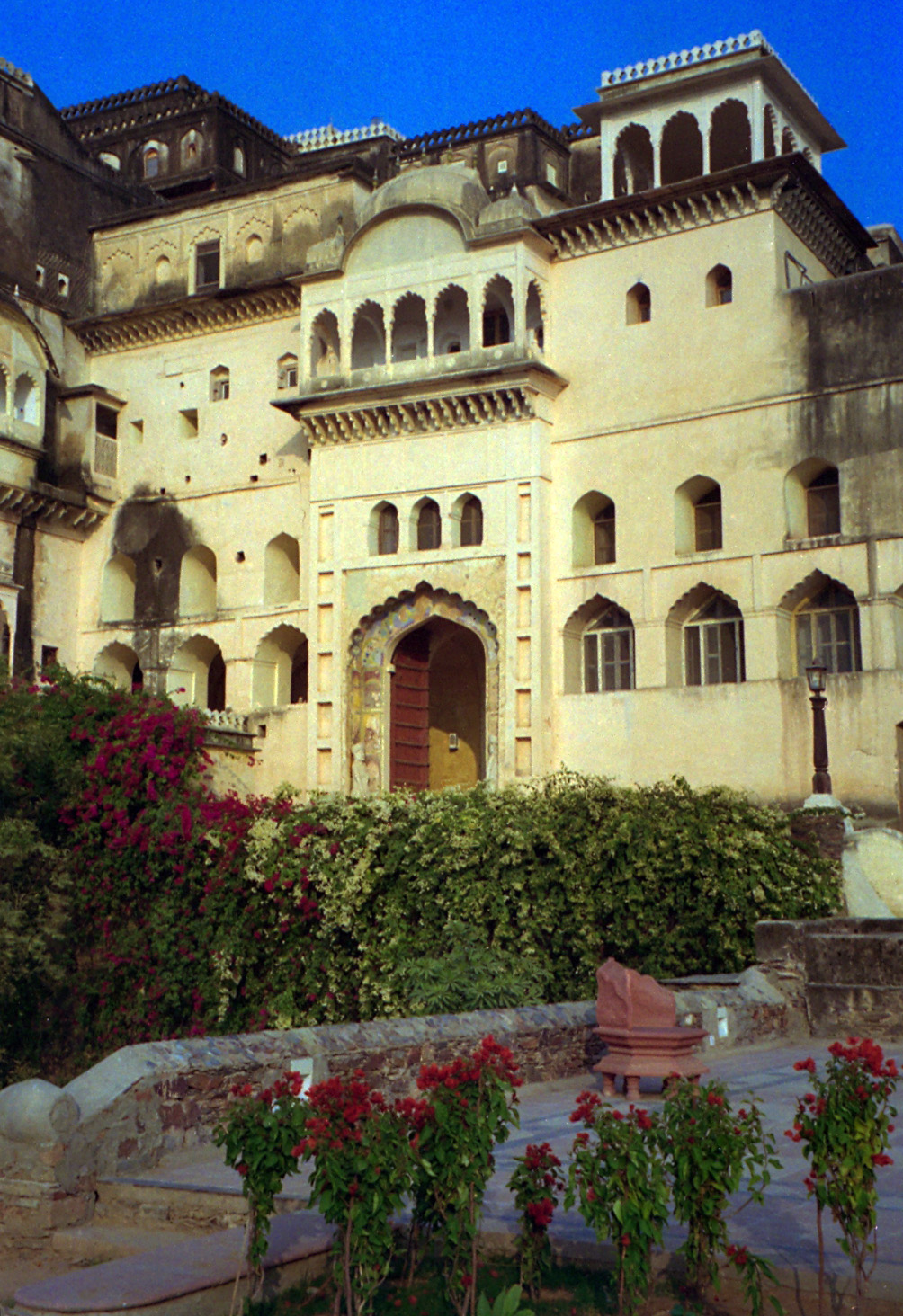
Neemrana Fort Palace

- Sariska Palace, Sariska, Alwar
- Lohagarh Fort, Bharatpur
- Bijai Garh, Bayana
- Timangarh, Karauli District
- Hindaun Fort
- Matiya Mahal, Hindaun
- Mandrail fort, Karauli
- Mandholi fort, Sikar
- Patan fort, Kotputli
