= Gajner Palace, Bikaner =

Heritage hotel in Bikaner

Gajner Palace
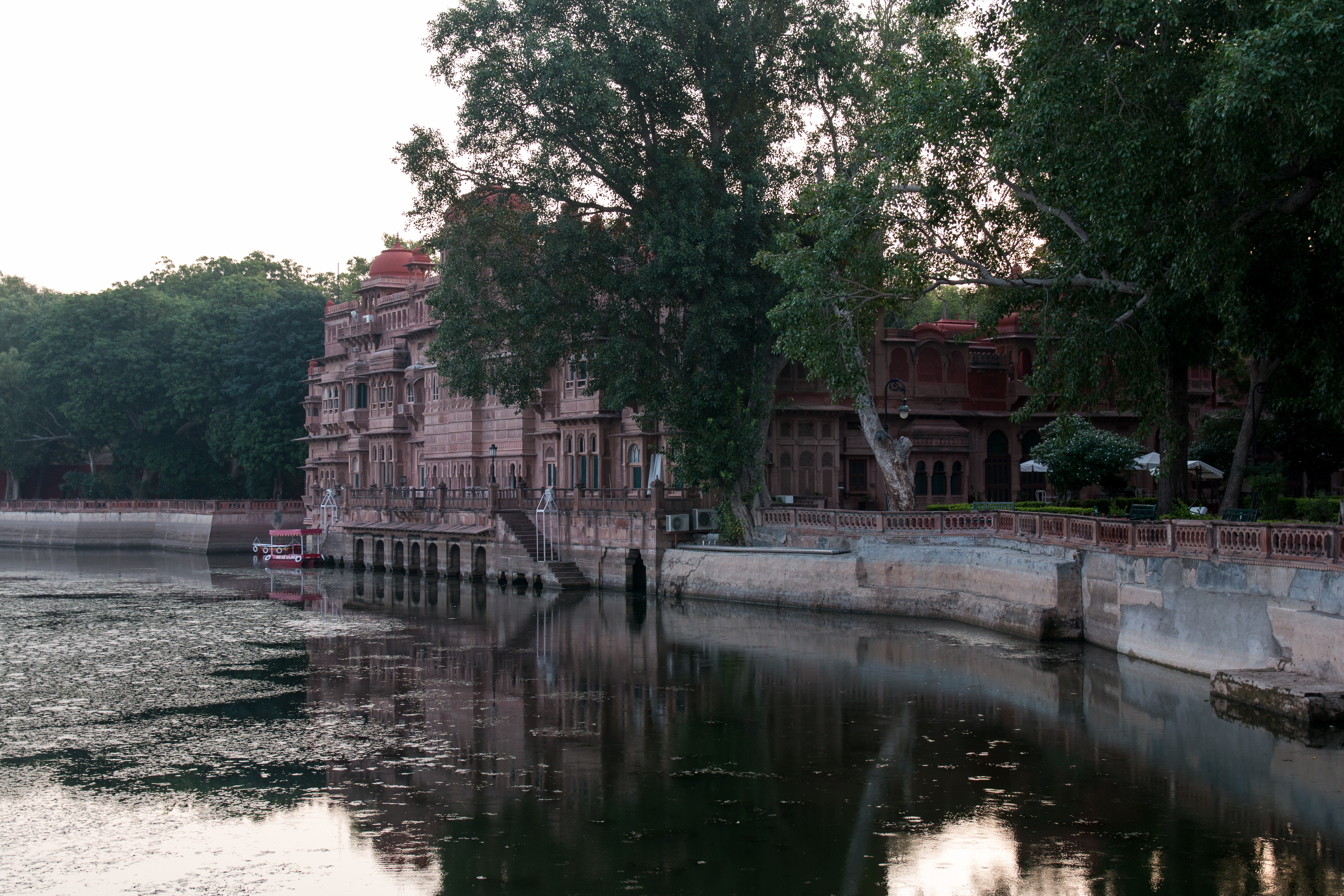
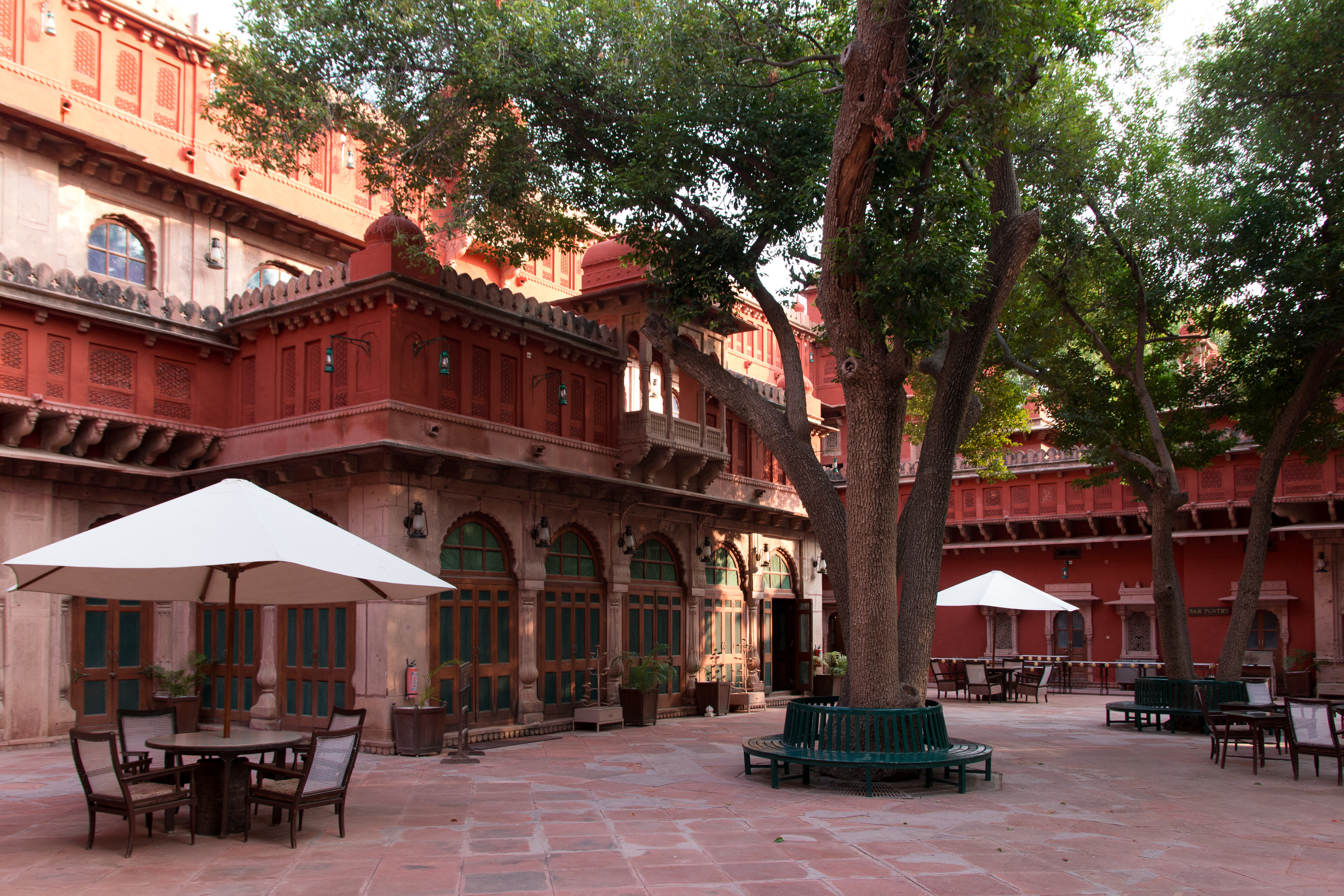
- Top: Gajner Palace with lake in front Bottom: Gajner Palace courtyard

- Location within Rajasthan

General information
- Status: Adapted to a heritage hotel
- Location: Bikaner, Rajasthan, India
- Coordinates: 27.9453°N 73.0527°E
- Client: Ganga Singh
- Operator: HRH Group of Hotels

Design and construction
- Architect: Samuel Swinton Jacob

Gajner Palace in Bikaner, Rajasthan, India, served as a hunting lodge for the maharajas of Bikaner. It now operates as a heritage hotel.

== History ==
When Gaj Singh, the Maharaja of Bikaner, was returning from Jaisalmer after his marriage with its princess, he and his entourage encamped at Chandasar. His wife, who was missing her paternal home, told him that she saw Jaisalmer in Chandasar and requested him to create a pleasure garden there for her. In the group she brought from her hometown, there was a gardener skilled in desert farming. Gaj commissioned him to landscape a low tract called Magra. He also built an artificial lake called Gaj Sagar to supply water to his wife's garden. He also built a Jal Mahal for her and established a village named Gajsinghpura after himself there. Over the years, Gajsinghpura became Gajner. In 1808, the troops of Jodhpur, during a siege against Bikaner, destroyed the palace. The later-day palaces and canal system at Gajner were the work of Sardar Singh, Dungar Singh, and Ganga Singh. When the famine of 1899 left the Gaj Sagar empty, Ganga Singh deepened the lake and widened it so that two years of water supply could be held in it. Its capacity was 50 mcft (1,415,842,329.6 liters), and its catchment area was approximately 50 sq. miles (129.5 km^{2}).

Besides the Vallabh gardens, it was one of the two private game reserves of the Maharajas of Bikaner. It was compared to being on par with British hunting estates such as Balmoral and Sandringham. When important guests would visit Ganga Singh, they were taken here to shoot the great Indian bustard or the sandgrouse. A record stands from the bygone days that 11,000 birds were shot in a day using as many as 40 guns.

Ganga Singh commissioned Samuel Swinton Jacob, who had designed Lalgarh, to design a new palace for him. This palace, made of pink sandstone, was built around 1910–13. It was fully equipped with comforts and included a separate wing for visitors. It became known as Gajner Palace. Mumbai (then Bombay)-based John Roberts and Co. was commissioned to furnish it. Ganga Singh's grandson, Karni Singh, who rarely shot anything but clay pigeons and was a strict vegetarian due to the influence of his mother, who was also a vegetarian and did not herself shoot, was generally opposed to the taking of life. He opened a portion of the palace for his private guests and disapproved of hunting on Gajner grounds. Now it is converted into a heritage hotel. It is managed by HRH Group of Hotels.

== Features ==
Its compound stretches over 6000 acres. It is situated in a thick forest. It is divided into four wings: Dungar Niwas, Mandir Chowk, Gulab Niwas, and Champa Niwas. Migratory birds flock in great numbers and can be viewed here.
