= Bijey Singh =

Member of the Bikaner Royal family

- Maharaj
- Singh (right)

Maharaj of Chhatargarh
- Reign: 9 February 1912 – 11 February 1932
- Predecessor: Lall Singh
- Successor: Amar Singh
- Born: 29 March 1909
- Died: 11 February 1932 (aged 22)
- Cause of death: Suicide by gunshot
- Spouse: Manohar Kanwar (m. 1927)
- Issue: Jay Kanwar; Lakshmi Kanwar; Dev Kanwar; Amar Singh (adoptive)
- House: Bikaner
- Dynasty: Rathore
- Father: Lall Singh (adoptive); Ganga Singh (biological)
- Mother: Mahtab Kanwar (adoptive); Ajab Kanwar (biological)

Bijey Singh (sometimes Bijai Singh or Bijay Singh; 29 March 1909 – 11 February 1932) was a son of Ganga Singh, the Maharaja of Bikaner, and a proprietor of the estate of Chhatargarh from 9 February 1912 until his death in 1932.

== Biography ==
Singh was born on 29 March 1909 to Ganga Singh, the Maharaja of Bikaner, and his third wife, Ajab Kanwar. His mother was a daughter of Bahadur Singh, the Thakur of Bhikamkor in Jodhpur. At the wish of his paternal grandmother, Mahtab Kanwar, who wanted to preserve the line of her husband, Lall Singh, his father gave him to her in adoption, at which time he was no more than two months of age. However, it was not until 9 February 1912, about two years and one month after the death of Mahtab Kanwar, that the requisite religious ceremonies were held at the Durbar Hall of the Junagarh Fort. On the occasion, he was presented with the sword of Lall Singh, and the turban of Lall Singh was tied on his head. He thereafter succeeded Lall Singh to his estate of Chhatargarh. Windham, the British Resident accredited to Bikaner, who gave consent to this adoption, also attended the ceremony. Ganga Singh enlarged his fief, which originally consisted of two villages, Surpura and Chhatargarh, and made it free of all cesses and taxes. On 26 April 1927, he married Manohar Kanwar, who was from Jaisalmer, and together they had three daughters: Jay Kanwar, Lakshmi Kanwar and Dev Kanwar. He had also adopted Amar Singh, a son of his older brother Sadul Singh. He frequently accompanied his biological father on the latter's travels to meetings and conferences in India and abroad. He had accompanied him to, among others, the League of Nations, the Imperial Conference, and the first Round Table Conference. In 1929, the pratiṣṭhā and house-warming ceremony for Bijey Bhawan, his residence at Bikaner, was held. His residence went on to house the College of Veterinary and Animal Science, Bikaner.

When Sadul Singh fell out of favour with Ganga Singh, the Maharaja wrote to Rufus Isaacs, then Viceroy and Governor-General of India, stating that Bijey should succeed him in due course. Ganga Singh had that letter signed by members of the state council, several of the state's senior nobles, and by the members of the royal family.

== Suicide ==
Singh wished to bring a maidservant who worked in the palace into his zenana, but Ganga Singh refused to allow it. To which Singh questioned Ganga Singh and pointed out that if he could bring Dhuluji, a dancing girl, into his zenana, why he could not be allowed to do so. After failing to persuade Ganga Singh, he went to Ajab Kanwar and asked her to give him a cup of liquor with her own hand. She gave it to him. He told her that they were saying goodbye to each other for the last time, and left. Following that, on 11 February 1932, he shot himself and died.

== Aftermath ==
Upon his death, his adopted son, Amar Singh, succeeded to his estate. On account of his death, all offices were kept closed in Palanpur on 13 February 1932. In his memory, Ganga Singh built the Prince Bijey Singh Memorial Men's Hospital and the Prince Bijey Singh Memorial Women's Hospital. These hospitals were completed in 1937 at the cost of 1,441,612 rupees. Both hospitals were staffed by highly qualified and well-known doctors recruited from across India and abroad, and were inaugurated by the Maharana of Udaipur.

== Interests ==
Singh was fond of hunting and often took his nephew, Karni Singh, on shooting expeditions in the vicinity of Bikaner. One of the locations they visited was Darbari Lake, which is in the vicinity of Gajner, and on other occasions, Singh and his party travelled by open-top cars into the surrounding desert scrub where they engaged in shooting birds. During the visit of Edward VIII, when he was still the Prince of Wales, to Bikaner in 1921, Bijey participated in a shoot that continued from 3 to 7 December 1921. On the afternoon of 3 December 1921, he bagged eight ducks; on the morning of 5 December 1921, he bagged one duck and twelve black-bellied sandgrouse; and on the morning of 6 December 1921, one sandgrouse and eleven black-bellied sandgrouse. In the 1920s, he, along with Sadul Singh, carried out a programme to thin out overpopulated blackbuck herds near Hanumangarh, and in 1925, he shot a leopard in Bikaner.

== Titles and styles ==
Singh held numerous titles, starting from his birth as the son of a Maharaja of Bikaner, then as proprietor of the estate of Chhatargarh. Each is listed below; where two dates are shown, the first indicates the date of receiving the title, and the second indicates the date of its loss or renunciation:

- 29 March 1909 – 9 February 1912: Maharajkumar Bijey Singh of Bikaner
- 9 February 1912 – 11 February 1932: Maharaj Bijey Singh of Chhatargarh
