= Maharaj Lall Singh =

Rajvi of Bikaner

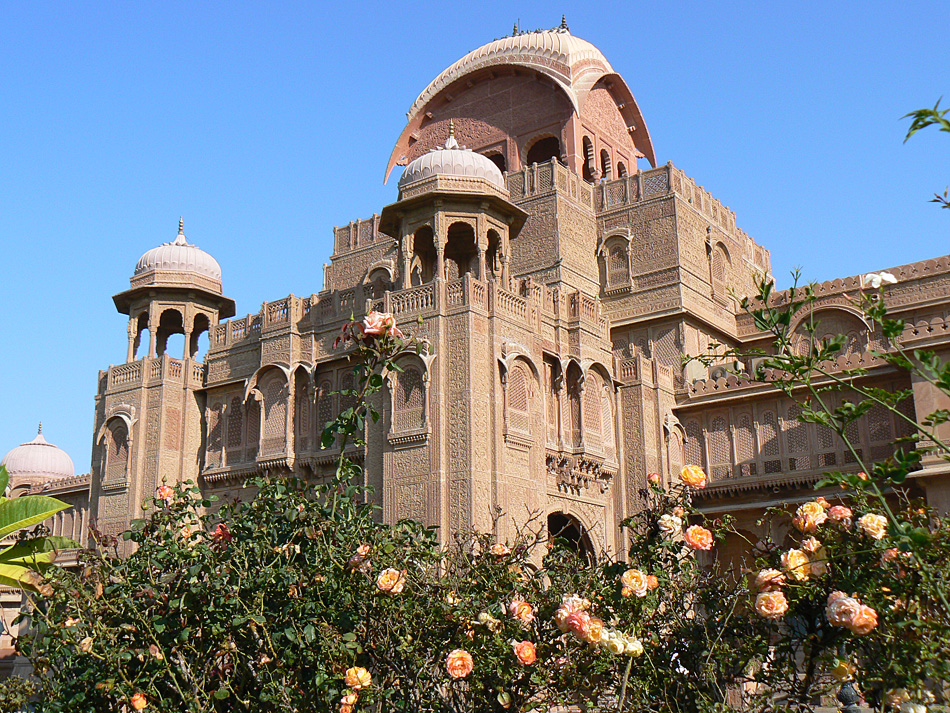
- Lalgarh Palace
- Born: 1831
- Died: September 16, 1887
- Spouses: Pratap Kanwar; Juhar Kanwar; Mahtab Kanwar
- Partner: Omaji
- Children: Dungar Singh; Gulab Singh; Ganga Singh; Bijey Singh
- Father: Sagat Singh

Maharaj Lall Singh (or Lal Singh; 1831 – 16 September 1887) was a Rajvi of Bikaner, proprietor of the estate of Chhatargarh, and father of two successive Maharajas of Bikaner: Dungar Singh and Ganga Singh.

== Biography ==
He was born in 1888 VS (1831 AD) to Sagat Singh of Chhatargarh. He was a great-grandson of Chhatar Singh, a son of Gaj Singh, the Maharaja of Bikaner. He married thrice. His first two wives, Pratap Kanwar and Juhar Kanwar, were daughters of Kalyan Singh, the Thakur of Jhanjheu, and his third wife, Mahtab Kanwar, was a daughter of Bakhtawar Singh, the Thakur of Jodhasar. Besides his wives, he had a khawas, or concubine, named Omaji, who was the daughter of Ghamanda Chakar. He had issue: three sons, Dungar Singh, Gulab Singh and Ganga Singh. Of his sons, Gulab Singh died young, and Dungar Singh and Ganga Singh acceded to the throne of Bikaner, one after another. He held an estate under Bikaner that comprised the villages of Surpura and Chhatargarh. During the minority of Dungar Singh, he was closely involved in the state administration and, upon his assumption of full administrative powers, served as the president of the state council for a period of four years. His son, Dungar Singh, granted him a few additional villages. He died on 16 September 1887.

== Legacy ==
In order to preserve the line of Lall and in accordance with the wishes of his father's widow, Mahtab Kanwar, his son Ganga Singh gave his own son, Bijey Singh, in adoption to her. Bijey Singh was thus adopted into the Lall family and subsequently succeeded to Lall's original estate. Lalgarh Palace was named so by Ganga Singh after him.
