= Rajyashree Kumari =

Indian sport shooter (born 1953)

- Born: 4 June 1953 (age 72); Bikaner, Rajasthan, India
- Parent(s): Karni Singh; Sushila Kumari

Rajyashree Kumari (born 4 June 1953) is a former competition shooter from India. The Arjuna Award in shooting was conferred on her in 1968, when she was 16 years old.She is the daughter of Dr. Karni Singh, Maharaja of Bikaner, daughter of Maharaja Maharani Sushila,

She is the chairperson of the Maharaja Ganga Singhji Trust and the owner of the Lalgarh Palace. Rajyashree runs many charitable trusts and resides in Bikaner. She got married at an early age, but got divorced due to differences. She has one daughter, Anupama Kumari, and a son, Sajjan Sinh.
