= Udramsar railway station =

Railway station in Rajasthan, India

Udramsar

General information
- Location: Udairamsar, Bikaner district, Rajasthan; India
- Coordinates: 27.922974°N 73.343837°E
- Elevation: 241 metres (791 ft)
- System: Indian Railways station
- Owner: Indian Railways
- Operator: North Western Railway
- Line: Jodhpur–Bathinda line
- Platforms: 1
- Tracks: Single Electric-Line

Construction
- Structure type: Standard (on-ground station)

Other information
- Status: Functioning
- Station code: UMS
- Zone(s): North Western Railway
- Division(s): Jodhpur

Services
| Preceding station | Indian Railways | Following station |
|---|---|---|
| Palana towards ? | North Western Railway zone Jodhpur–Bathinda line | Bikaner Junction towards ? |
Location
- Interactive map

Udramsar railway station is a railway station located on the Jodhpur–Bathinda railway line operated by the North Western Railway zone under Jodhpur railway division. It is situated at Udairamsar in Bikaner district in the Indian state of Rajasthan.
