= Sidhi Kumari =

Indian politician

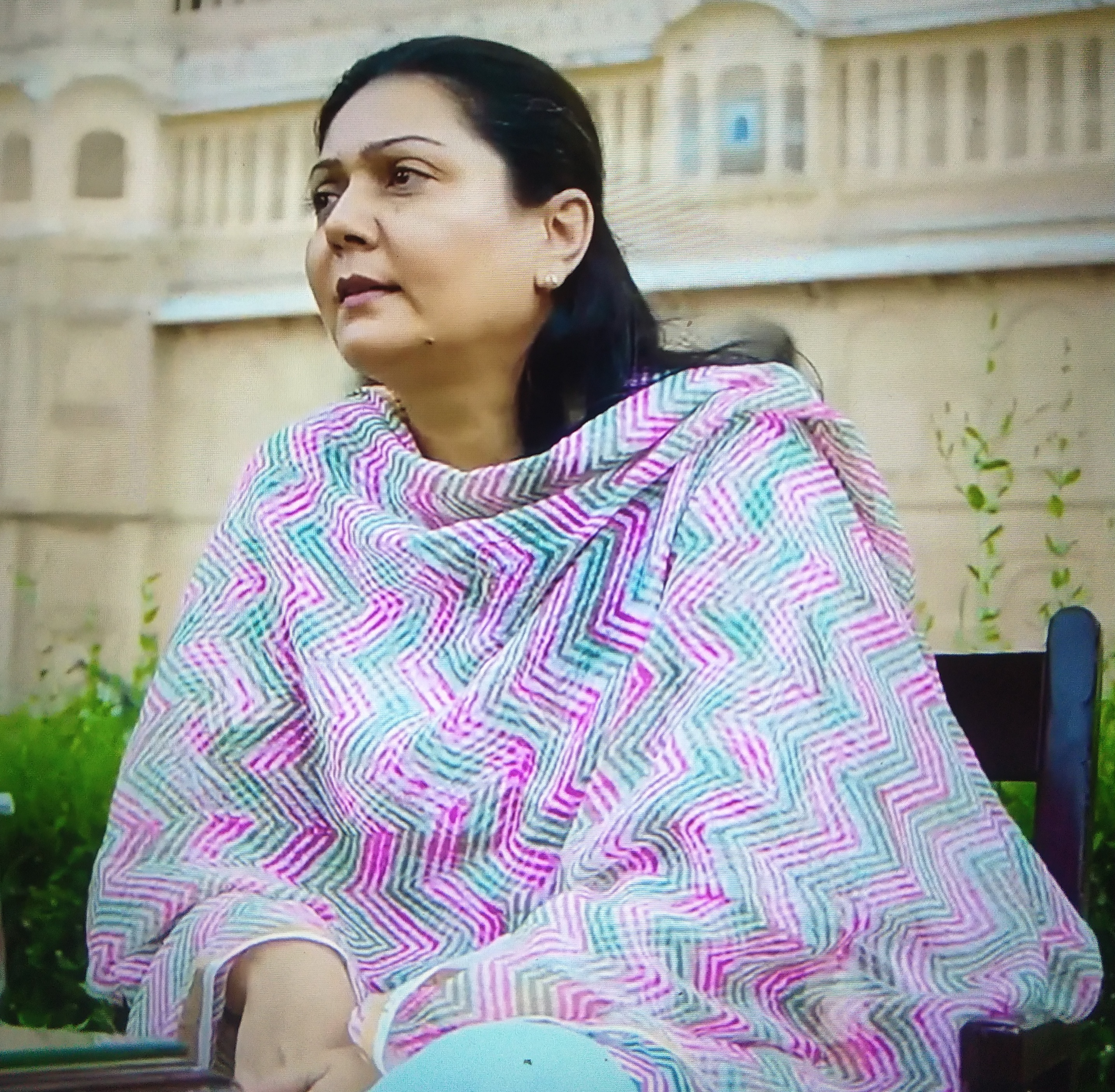

Member of the Rajasthan Legislative Assembly
- Incumbent
- Assumed office 2008
- Constituency: Bikaner East

Personal details
- Born: 6 October 1973 (age 52) Bikaner, India
- Party: Bharatiya Janata Party

Sidhi Kumari (born 6 October 1973) is an Indian politician from Rajasthan. She is a four time MLA and currently serving as a member of the 16th Rajasthan Legislative Assembly from the Bikaner East constituency. She has been serving as an MLA since the creation of this constituency seat after delimitation in 2008. She won from Bikaner East constituency in 2008, 2013, 2018, and 2023 as a candidate of the Bharatiya Janata Party.

== Early life ==
She was born in 1973 into the former Royal family of Bikaner. She is the daughter of Narendra Singh Bahadur and the granddaughter of Karni Singh Bahadur of Bikaner. She pursued studies up to M.A. and currently serves as the director of the Museum at Lalgarh Palace.

She is fondly called Bai Sa (beloved daughter) in Bikaner.

== Political career ==
She won the 2023 Rajasthan Legislative Assembly election, from the Bikaner East Assembly constituency representing the Bharatiya Janata Party. She defeated Yashpal Gehlot of the Indian National Congress by a margin of 19,303 votes.
