= Udairamsar =

- Village
- Location in Rajasthan, India Udairamsar (India)
- Country: India
- State: Rajasthan
- District: Bikaner

Government
  - Type: Gram panchayat
  - Sarpanch: Hemant Singh Yadav

Languages

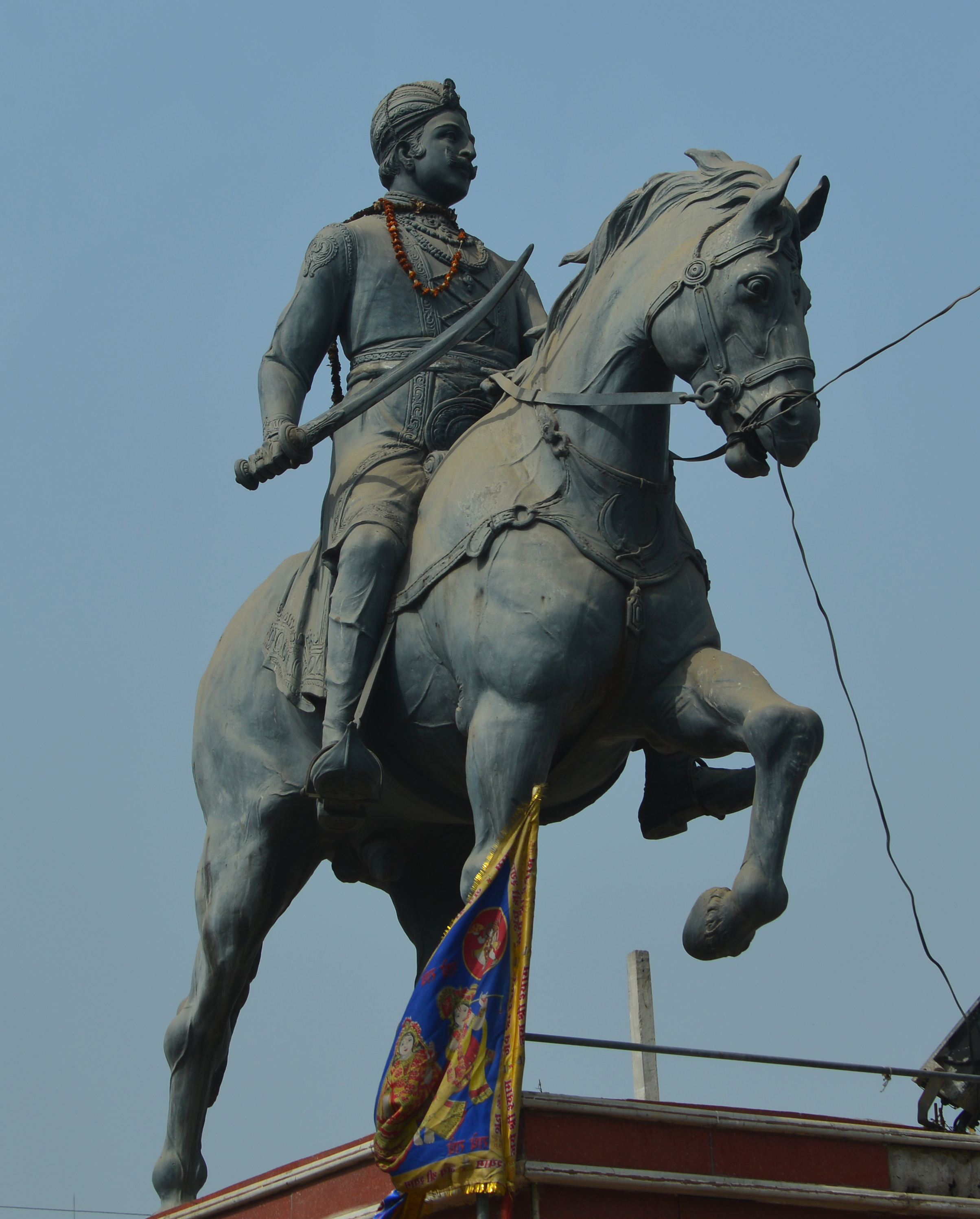
Rao Gopal Dev

Udairamsar is a town/village which is located 10 km south of Bikaner city. It lies in the Bikaner district of Rajasthan. It is well connected to Bikaner and to nearby places like Nokha, Mukam, Kolayat, Nagaur. National Camel Research Farm, Bikaner lies 10 km northeast of the Udairamsar. The Yadav caste is dominant and forms the majority in Udairamsar Village.

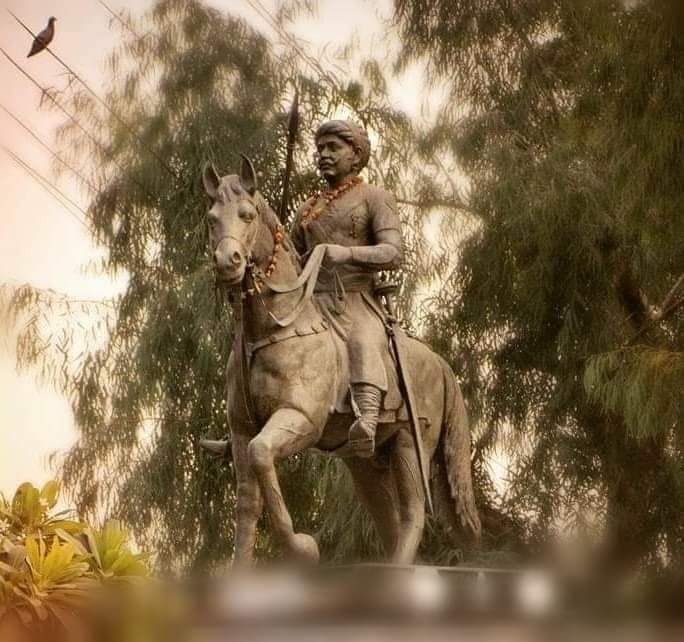
Rao Udairamsar

Hindi and Rajasthani language are spoken in the village. Udairamsar has a Gram panchayat. The village has State Bank of India branch, Government & Private Schools, Murli Singh Yadav B.Ed. College. Dr Karan Singh Yadav, who became Member of Parliament from Alwar in Feb 2018, hails from Udairamsar.Ex. Sarpanch Hemant Singh Yadav is a famous social worker and running a "Gausala".

The village comes under Bikaner East (Rajasthan Assembly constituency). Udairamsar is surrounded by Kolayat Tehsil to the west, Nokha Tehsil to the south, Lunkaransar Tehsil to the north and Sri Dungargarh Tehsil to the east.

== Transportation ==
Udramsar railway station is the nearest rail connection situated on the Jodhpur–Bathinda railway line operated by the North Western Railway zone.
