= Palana railway station =

Railway station in Rajasthan, India

Palana

General information
- Location: Palana, Bikaner district, Rajasthan; India
- Coordinates: 27.845286°N 73.273605°E
- Elevation: 262 metres (860 ft)
- System: Indian Railways station
- Owner: Indian Railways
- Operator: North Western Railway
- Line: Jodhpur–Bathinda line
- Platforms: 1
- Tracks: Single Electric-Line

Construction
- Structure type: Standard (on-ground station)

Other information
- Status: Functioning
- Station code: PAE
- Zone(s): North Western Railway
- Division(s): Jodhpur

Services
Preceding station	Indian Railways	Following station
Deshnoke towards ?	North Western Railway zone Jodhpur–Bathinda line	Udramsar towards ?
Location
- Interactive map

Palana railway station is a railway station located on the Jodhpur–Bathinda railway line operated by the North Western Railway zone under Jodhpur railway division. It is situated at Palana in Bikaner district in the Indian state of Rajasthan.
