= Karni Singh =

Last titular Maharaja of Bikaner (1924–1988)

- Maharaja
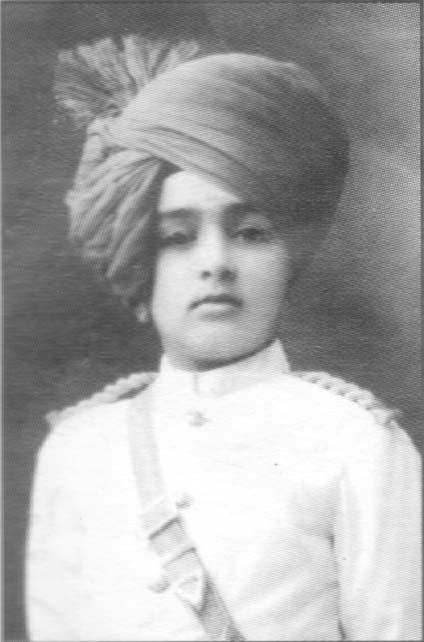
- Contemporary portrait of Maharaja Karni Singh

Maharaja of Bikaner Maharaja Sadul Singh
- Reign: 1950–1977
- Predecessor: Maharaja Sadul Singh
- Successor: position disestablished
- Issue: 3, including Rajyashree Kumari, Narendra Singh
- Dynasty: Rathore
- Father: Maharaja Sadul Singh
- Religion: Hinduism

Member of Parliament, Lok Sabha
- In office 1952–1977
- Preceded by: constituency established
- Succeeded by: Hari Ram Godara
- Constituency: Bikaner

Personal details
- Born: 21 April 1924 Bikaner, Bikaner State, British Indian Empire
- Died: 6 September 1988 (aged 64) New Delhi, India
- Party: Independent

Colonel Dr. Maharaja Karni Singh ji (21 April 1924 – 6 September 1988), also known as Dr Karni Singh, was from 1950 the last Maharaja of Bikaner State to hold the title of Maharaja of Bikaner, officially, until 1971, when the privy purse and all the royal titles were abolished by the Republic of India. He was also a politician, serving as a member of the Lok Sabha for twenty-five years, from 1952 to 1977, and an international clay pigeon and skeet champion. He was the son of Lt. General Maharaja Sir Sadul Singh of Bikaner and Maharani Sudarshan Kumari of Rewah.

== Early life and education ==
Born as Prince Karni Singh on 21 April 1924 in the princely state of Bikaner, Singh's first schooling was there, after which he attended St Stephen's College, Delhi, and St. Xavier's College, Bombay, where he graduated BA with Honours in History and Politics.

== Career ==
He saw active service in the Second World War, serving in the Middle East with his grandfather, General Sir Ganga Singh, the 23rd Maharaja of Bikaner. Prince Karni succeeded his father, Lieutenant-General Maharaja Sir Sadul Singh, in 1950.

In 1952, the young Maharaja Karni Singh was elected Member of Parliament in the Lok Sabha (Lower House) of India from Bikaner constituency as an independent candidate, serving on several consultative committees of different ministries and holding his seat until 1977.

In 1964, he received the degree of Doctor of Philosophy from Bombay University, for his thesis The relationship of the Bikaner royal family with central authority (1465–1949).

Singh competed in the 1960, 1964, 1968, 1972, and 1980 Summer Olympics.

== Family ==
He was the elder son of Maharaja Sadul Singh, and his name was chosen after their deity's name Karni mata. Singh was married to princess Sushila Kumari of Dungarpur on 25 February 1944 and they had one son and two daughters: Narendra Singh, Rajyashree Kumari, and Madhulika Kumari.

His daughter Princess Rajyashree Kumari was also a first class shooting sportswoman who received the Arjuna Award in 1968.

He was succeeded by his son Narendra Singh, who has 3 daughters: Daksha Kumari, Siddhi Kumari, and Mahima Kumari. Siddhi Kumari is active in today's politics, currently Member of the Legislative Assembly from Bikaner East.

His younger brother was Lt Colonel Maharaj Amar Singh of Bikaner (Chattargarh-Anupgarh) and his elder sister was Maharani Sushila Kanwar of Udaipur-Mewar.

His closest paternal cousins were via uncle Captain Maharajkumar Bijey Singh of Bikaner (Chattargarh-Anupgarh): Rani Jaya Kumari of Jashpur, Maharani Lakshmi Kumari of Narsingharh, Maharani Dev Kanwar of Dungarpur and via aunt Maharani Shiv Kumari of Kotah: Maharao Brijraj Singh of Kotah & Rani Indra Kumari of Rajgarh. His extended paternal cousins would be his cousins from the cadet branches (Ridi, Tejrasar) of the extended Bikaner Royal Family. They were: Rajkumar Kishore Singh, Maharaj Tej Singh, Maharaj Chandra Singh, Rajkumari Lakshman Kanwar, Maharaj Pratap Singh, Rajkumar Roop Singh, Rajkumari Dev Kanwar, Major General Maharaj Ranjit Singh, Air Commodore Maharaj Bahadur Singh, Maharaj Govind Singh, Rajkumari Bakhat Kanwar, Rajkumari Jatan Kanwar, Rajkumar Mohan Singh.

His closest maternal cousin was via Uncle Maharaja Ghulab Singh Ju Deo of Rewah: Maharaja Martand Singh Ju Deo of Rewah

== Sporting career ==
Singh won the National Championship in Clay Pigeon Trap and Skeet seventeen times and represented India at all levels of international competition. He was the first Indian to compete at five Olympic Games, which he did from 1960 to 1980, missing the Games of 1976, representing India at clay pigeon shooting at the Summer Olympics in Rome, 1960, Tokyo, 1964 (Captain), Mexico, 1968, Munich, 1972, and Moscow, 1980. His best positions in competition were eighth in 1960 and tenth in 1968.

He represented his country in the World Shooting Championships at Oslo in 1961, and the next year won a silver medal at the 38th World Shooting Championships in Cairo, after tie for 1st place, captaining the Indian team. He also competed in the World Shooting Championships at Wiesbaden in 1966, again captaining the team, and at Bologna in 1967 and San Sebastian in 1969. He competed in the Asian Shooting Championships at Tokyo in 1967 and at Seoul in 1971, where he won a gold medal. He won a silver medal at the Asian Games in Tehran, 1974, and another in the Asian Games at Kuala Lumpur in 1975.

In 1981, he won the Welsh Grand Prix for clay pigeon shooting, the North Wales Cup and the North West of England Cup.

In 1961, he was given the Arjuna award, becoming the first person from the world of shooting to be rewarded with that national honour. He documented his shooting experiences in a book of memoirs called From Rome to Moscow.

Singh was also a keen player of tennis, golf, and cricket, and held a private pilot's licence.

== Memberships ==
Singh was a member of the Asiatic Society of India, the National Sports Club of India, the Cricket Club of India, the Western India Automobile Association, the Bombay Natural History Society, the Bombay Flying Club, the Bombay Presidency Golf Club, the Delhi Golf Club, the Clay Pigeon Shooting Association (of which he was an honorary life vice-president), the Willingdon Sports Club, and the Royal Wimbledon Golf Club.

== Legacy ==
Dr. Karni Singh Shooting Range situated near the historic Tughlaqabad Fort in Delhi was named after him. It was first constructed for the 1982 Asian Games in New Delhi, and later rebuilt for the 2010 Commonwealth Games.

== See also ==
- List of royal Olympians

Karni Singh Rathore Dynasty Born: 21 April 1924 Died: 6 September 1988
Titles in pretence
Preceded by Sadul Singh	— TITULAR — Maharaja of Bikaner; 1950–71; Reason for succession failure: Royal titles & privy purse abolished by Government of India	Succeeded by None
