= Bikaner East Assembly constituency =

Constituency of the Rajasthan legislative assembly in India

Coordinates: 28.03°N 73.37°E

Bikaner East
- Constituency No. 14 for the Rajasthan Legislative Assembly

Constituency details
- Country: India
- Region: North India
- State: Rajasthan
- District: Bikaner district
- Established: 2008
- Reservation: None

Member of Legislative Assembly
- 16th Rajasthan Legislative Assembly
- Incumbent Sidhi Kumari
- Party: BJP

Bikaner East Assembly constituency is one of the 200 constituencies of Rajasthan Legislative Assembly. The territory comes under Bikaner Lok Sabha constituency also.

Bikaner East constituency covers all voters from parts of Bikaner tehsil, which include Bikaner Municipal Council wards, 5 to 13, 20, 22 to 28, 36 to 44 and 50 to 52, Patwar Circle Bikaner, Udairamsar, Gangashahar of ILRC Bikaner among others.

== Members of the Legislative Assembly ==
| Year | Name | Party |
|---|---|---|
| 2008 | Siddhi Kumari | Bharatiya Janata Party |
| 2013 | Siddhi Kumari | Bharatiya Janata Party |
| 2018 | Siddhi Kumari | Bharatiya Janata Party |
| 2023 | Siddhi Kumari | Bharatiya Janata Party |

== Election results ==
=== 2023 ===
2023 Rajasthan Legislative Assembly election: Bikaner East
| Party | Candidate | Votes | % | ±% |
|---|---|---|---|---|
| BJP | Siddhi Kumari | 89,917 | 53.07 | ▲5.37 |
| INC | Yashpal Gehlot | 70,614 | 41.68 | ▼1.42 |
| RLP | Manoj Bishnoi | 3,696 | 2.18 | |
| NOTA | None of the above | 1,725 | 1.02 | ▲0.44 |
| Majority | | 19,303 | 11.39 | ▲6.79 |
| Turnout | | 169,422 | 68.4 | ▼0.29 |
| BJP hold | | Swing | ▲6.79 | |

=== 2018 ===
2018 Rajasthan Legislative Assembly election: Bikaner East
| Party | Candidate | Votes | % | ±% |
|---|---|---|---|---|
| BJP | Siddhi Kumari | 73,174 | 47.7 | |
| INC | Kanhaiya Lal Jhanwar | 66,113 | 43.1 | |
| Independent | Gopal Gahlot | 4,969 | 3.24 | |
| BSP | Raphik Shah | 1,617 | 1.05 | |
| NOTA | None of the above | 895 | 0.58 | |
| Majority | | 7,061 | 4.6 | |
| Turnout | | 153,402 | 68.69 | |
| BJP hold | | Swing | ▼19.32 | |

=== 2013 ===
2013 Rajasthan Legislative Assembly election: Bikaner East
| Party | Candidate | Votes | % | ±% |
|---|---|---|---|---|
| BJP | Siddhi Kumari | 77,839 | 58.77% | −0.17% |
| INC | Gopal Lal Gahlot | 46,162 | 34.85% | +12.54% |
| NOTA | None of the Above | 2,187 | 1.65% | +1.65% |
| NUZP | Yasmeen Kohari | 1,835 | 1.39% | N/A |
| BSP | Mukhtyar | 1,106 | 0.83% | −3.81% |
| NPP | Safiullah | 605 | 0.46% | N/A |
| Jago Party | Vinod Tanwar | 542 | 0.41% | N/A |
| SP | Manoj Kumar Tiwari | 176 | 0.13% | N/A |
| Majority | | 31,677 | 23.92% | −12.71% |
| Turnout | | 1,32,458 | 69.04% | +6.05% |
| BJP hold | | Swing | ▼12.71 | |

=== 2008 ===
2008 Rajasthan Legislative Assembly election:Bikaner East
| Party | Candidate | Votes | % | ±% |
|---|---|---|---|---|
| BJP | Siddhi Kumari | 60,591 | 58.94 | |
| INC | Dr. Tanveer Malavat | 22,938 | 22.31 | |
| Independent | Vishwajeet Singh | 9,997 | 9.72 | |
| BSP | Kedar Gehlot | 4,773 | 4.64 | |
| NCP | Ram Kumar | 634 | 0.62 | |
| BJSH | Vijay Singh Shekhawat | 166 | 0.16 | |
| Majority | | 37,653 | 36.63 | |
| Turnout | | 102,809 | 62.99 | |
| BJP win (new seat) | | | | |
