= Dungar Singh =

Maharaja of Bikaner from 1872 to 1887

HH Maharaja Sir Dungar Singh

20th Maharaja of Bikaner
- Reign: 1872 - 1887
- Predecessor: Sardar Singh
- Successor: Ganga Singh
- Born: 22 August 1854
- Died: 19 August 1887 (aged 32)
- Spouse: HH Maharaniji Sa Bhatiyaniji (Pugalyaniji) Shri Mehtab Kanwarji of Sattasar in Bikaner State HH Maharaniji Sa Jadejiji Shri Pran Kunwarba Saheba of Kutch State HH Maharaniji Sa Shekhawatji (Kachwahiji) Shri Nawal Kanwarji Saheba of Manoharpur in Jaipur State HH Maharaniji Sa Rajawatji (Kachwahiji) Shri Chand Kanwarji Saheba of Baleri in Bikaner State
- House: Bikawat Rathore
- Father: Maharaj Lal Singh of Chatragarh in Bikaner State
- Mother: Tanwarji Shri Jawahar Kanwarji d.of Rao Kalyan Singh of Jhanjheu in Bikaner State

Maharaja Dungar Singh (22 August 1854 – 19 August 1887) was ruler of the princely state of Bikaner from the year 1872 to 1887 succeeding his childless predecessor Maharaja Sardar Singh after his death in 1872.

== Life ==
The eldest of three sons of Maharaj Sri Lal Singh (16 December 1831 – 17 September 1887), a member of the Rathore clan and of a cadet branch of Bikaner's ruling house, Dungar Singh was chosen to succeed his cousin Maharaja Sardar Singh when the ruler died without heirs in May 1872. He assumed management of the state in January 1873, but was unable to develop good relations with the state's nobles, resulting in misgovernment and direct British military intervention in support of the Maharaja. In late 1876, he went on pilgrimage to Haridwar and Gaya; during his return journey from Gaya, he stopped in Agra to meet the Prince of Wales (later Edward VII) while the latter was visiting India.

Dungar Singh was an enlightened and progressive monarch. He aided the British during the Second Afghan War (of Sherlock Holmes fame) in 1878 by supplying 800 camels. Deeply involved in education, he opened the first Bikaner public schools and college during his reign, also organising the first modern police force, an up-to-date budget and fiscal standards, dispensaries, a post office, and a civil surgeon, reforming the jails as well.

Dungar Singh died in 1887, only a few days shy of his 33rd birthday, his father following him in death a month later. He was succeeded by his youngest brother, Ganga Singh, whom he had adopted for himself as his son.

== Memorials ==
- Dungar College
