= Lalgarh Palace =

Palace and heritage hotel in Rajasthan, India

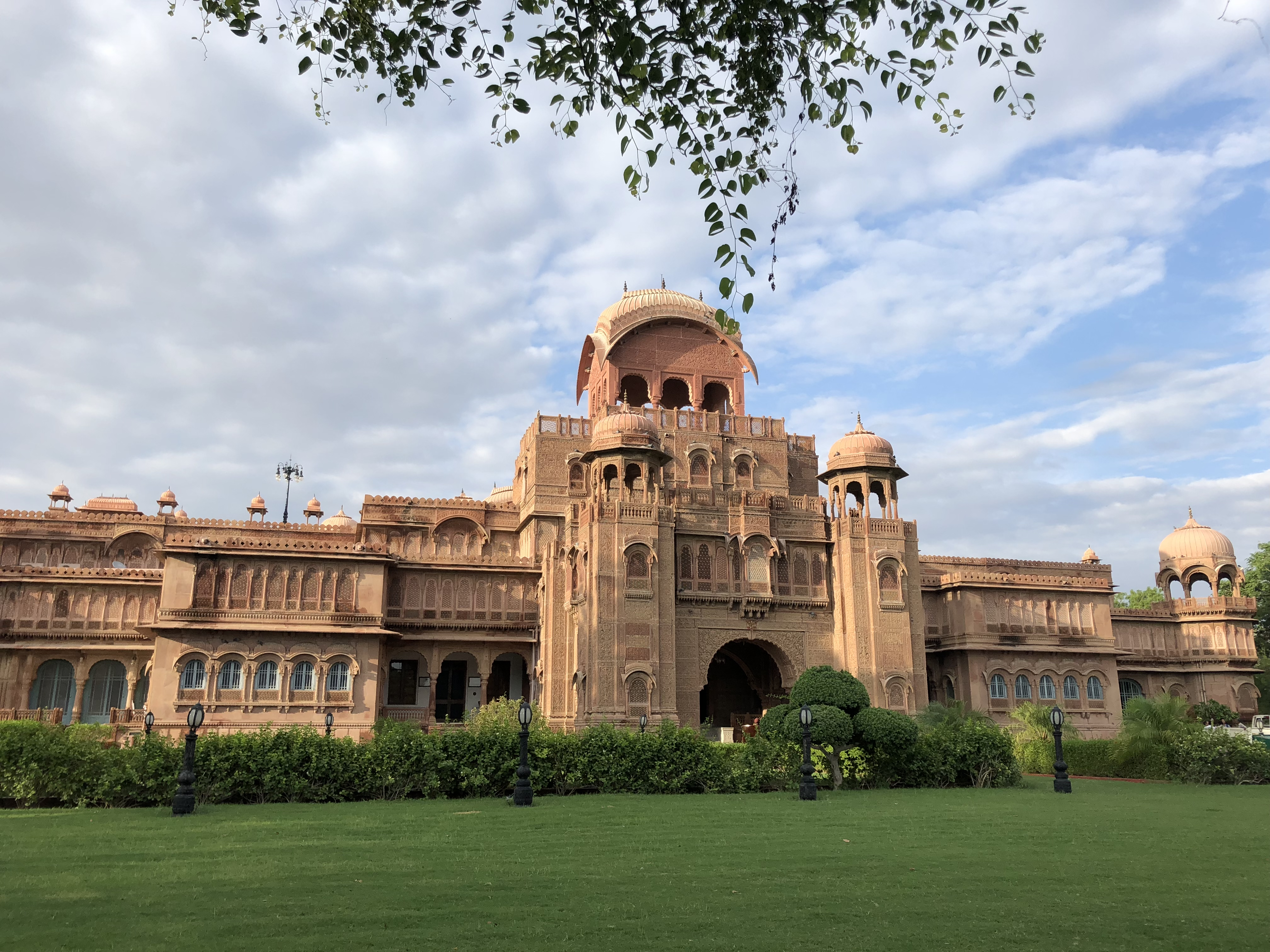
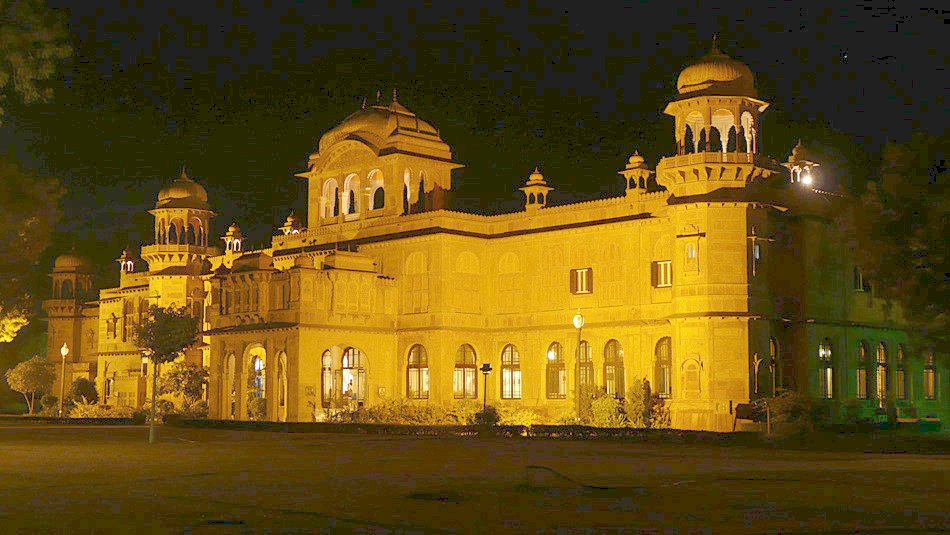
- Top: Lalgarh Palace during the day Bottom: Lalgarh Palace at night

- Location within Rajasthan

General information
- Type: Palace, hotel, marriage garden
- Architectural style: Usta art and Rajput architecture
- Location: Bikaner, near roadway bus stand, Bikaner, Bikaner, India
- Coordinates: 28.0410°N 73.3316°E

Design and construction
- Architect: Samuel Swinton Jacob

Lalgarh Palace is a palace and heritage hotel in Bikaner, in the Indian state of Rajasthan, built for Sir Ganga Singh, Maharaja of Bikaner, between 1902 and 1926. Laxmi Niwas Palace is a part of Lalgarh Palace but it has been given on lease and recently is being used as a heritage hotel and marriage garden.

== History ==
The palace was built between 1902 and 1926 in the Indo-Saracenic style. The building was commissioned by the British-controlled regency for Maharaja Ganga Singh (1881–1942) while he was still in his minority as they considered the existing Junagarh Fort unsuitable for a modern monarch. Ganga Singh decided that the palace should be named in memory of his father Maharaj Lal Singh.

Ganga Singh was legendary for his shikars (hunts), his hunts are preserved at Gajner Palace, in particular, his Imperial Sand Grouse hunts at Christmas. As a result, the palace hosted many guests including Georges Clemenceau in 1920, Queen Mary, King George V, Lord Harding, and Lord Irwin. Lord Curzon was the palace's first notable guest.

Stanley Reed, the official reporter of the 1905-06 India tour of the Prince and Princess of Wales (later King George V and Queen Mary of Great Britain) noted that "The Laxmi Niwas Palace is the most perfect modern building in the Indo-Saracenic style in India - an entirely graceful pile of carved red sandstone, nobly proportioned and harmonising entirely with its environment. Their Royal Highnesses have not been more splendidly housed since they landed in Bombay".

In 1972, Karni Singh, M.P., the Maharaja of Bikaner, established the Ganga Singhji Charitable Trust. The Maharaja endowed a part of Lallgarh Palace to be used in service of the trust. Two wings were converted into independent hotels with the income from The Lallgarh Palace Hotel, a heritage hotel used to support the trust. Currently, Lallgarh Palace is owned, and the hotel is run, by his daughter Maharajkumari (Princess) Rajyashree Kumari.

== Architecture ==
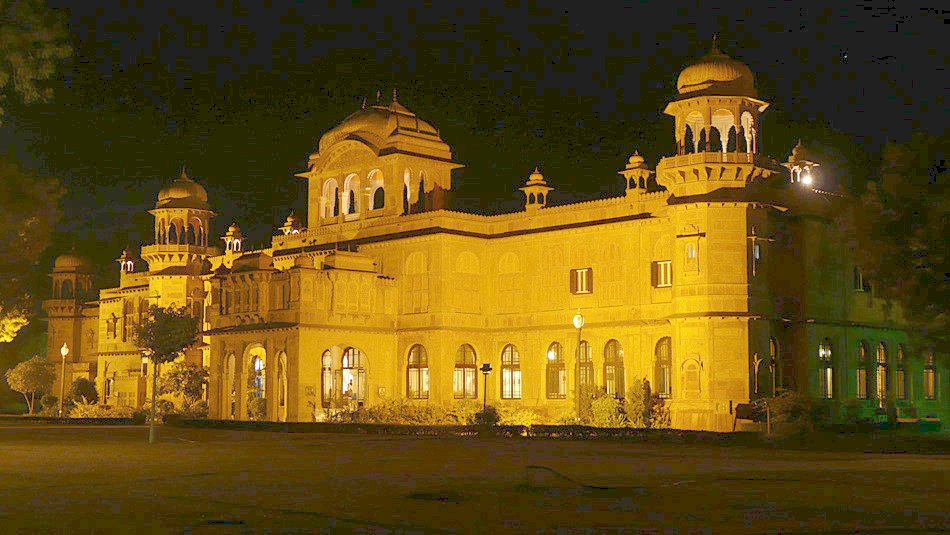
The palace at night

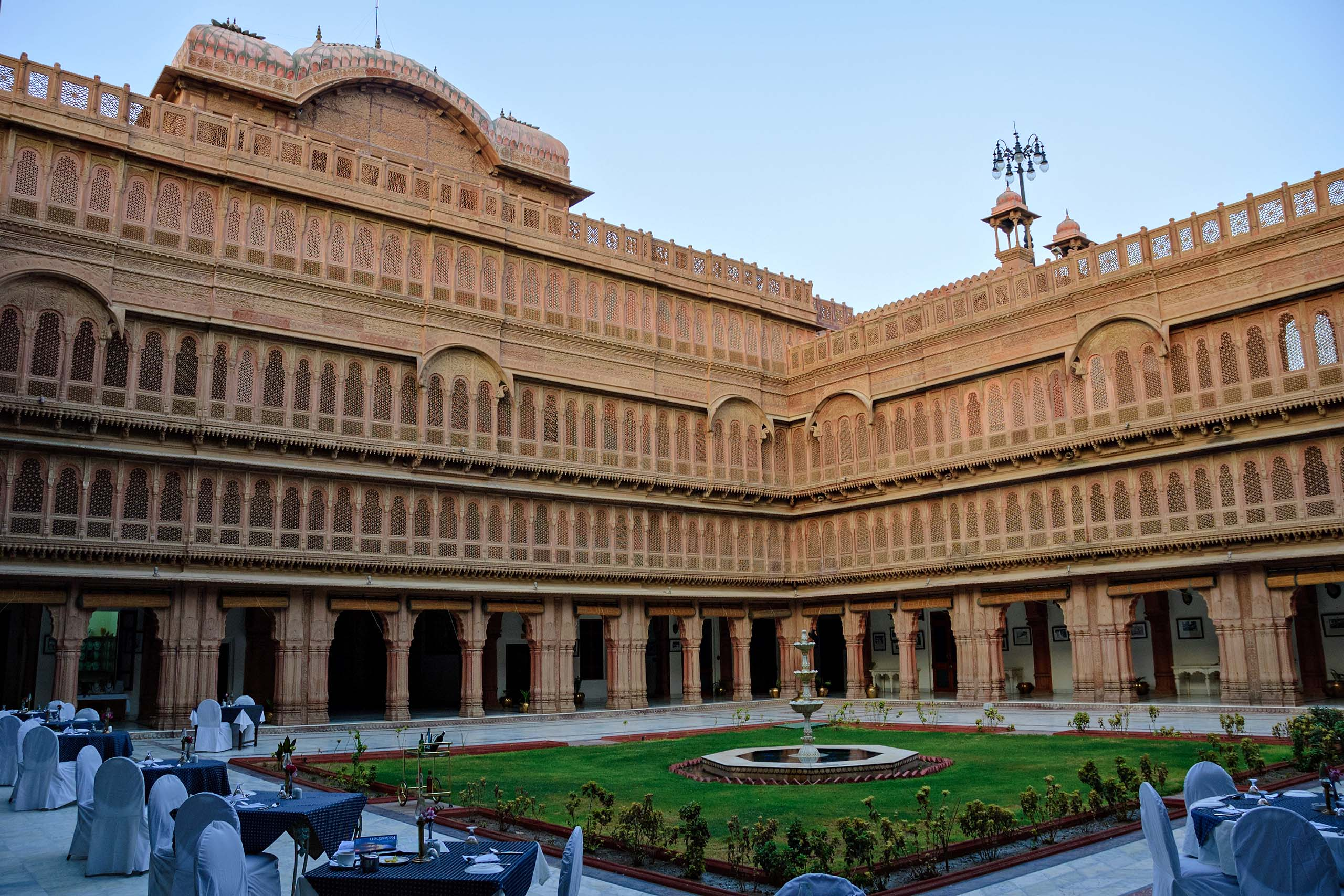
Laxmi Niwas Palace hotel - ornamented courtyard

The complex was designed by the British architect Sir Samuel Swinton Jacob. After a ritual blessing ceremony construction commenced in 1896 on empty land 5 miles from the existing Junagarh Fort on what is now Dr. Karni Singhji Road. The palace was arranged around two courtyards with the first wing, Laxmi Niwas completed in 1902. The remaining three wings were completed in stages with final completion of the complex accomplished in 1926.

The palace was originally designed to cost 100,000 rupees due to the planned use of cheaper materials including the suggestion of using stucco instead of carved stone in the construction. Soon however all cost-cutting was abandoned and by time of the completion of the first wing the cost had increased to 1 million rupees due to the use of the finest materials including the widespread employment of finely carved stonework.

The three-storey complex is coated in red sandstone quarried from the Thar Desert. The complex contains the features considered essential for a late 19th-century palace: drawing rooms, smoking rooms, guest suites, several grand halls, lounges, cupolas, pavilions, including a dining room which could seat 400 diners. The complex features magnificent pillars, elaborate fireplaces, Italian colonnades and intricate latticework and filigree work. The Karni Niwas wing houses the darbar hall and an art deco indoor swimming pool.

== Overview ==
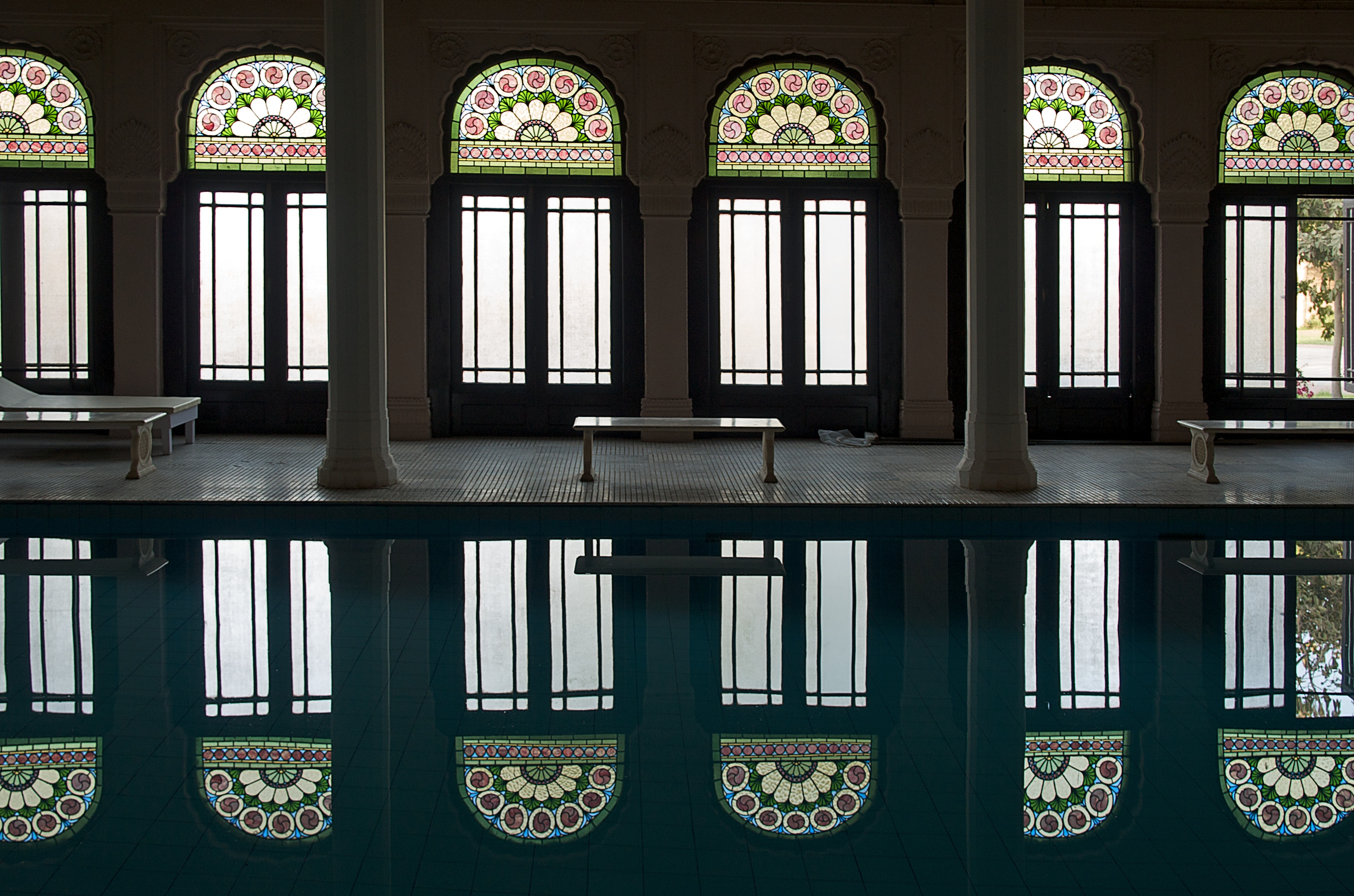
Indoor Pool at the Lallgarh Palace, Bikaner.

At present the palace houses the following:

- The Shri Sadul Museum which is located in the west wing which also contains the fourth largest private library in the world. The museum is open from 10:00 AM to 5:00 PM on all weekdays except on Sunday.
- In one wing the private home of the Bikaner Royal Family.
- The Lallgarh Palace Hotel. This is a Heritage hotel is owned and operated by the Maharaja Ganga Singh Ji Trust and marketed by Maharaja Heritage Resorts Limited under a Franchise and Marketing Services Agreement.
- The Laxmi Niwas Palace. This is a luxury hotel, owned by Golden Triangle Fort & Palace P. Ltd. The magnificent structure in red sandstone is one of the most popular destinations for tourists in Bikaner.

== Literature ==
- Crump, Vivien; Toh, Irene (1996). Rajasthan (hardback). London: Everyman Guides. p. 400 pages. ISBN 1-85715-887-3.
- Michell, George; Martinelli, Antonio (2005). The Palaces of Rajasthan. London: Frances Lincoln. p. 271 pages. ISBN 978-0-7112-2505-3.
- Crites, Mitchell Shelby; Nanji, Ameeta (2007). India Sublime – Princely Palace Hotels of Rajasthan (hardback). New York: Rizzoli. p. 272 pages. ISBN 978-0-8478-2979-8.
- Patnaik, Naveen (1990). A Desert Kingdom – The Rajputs of Bikaner (hardback). London: Weidenfeld and Nicolson. p. 120 pages. No known ISBN.
