= Ganga Singh =

Maharaja of Bikaner from 1888 to 1943

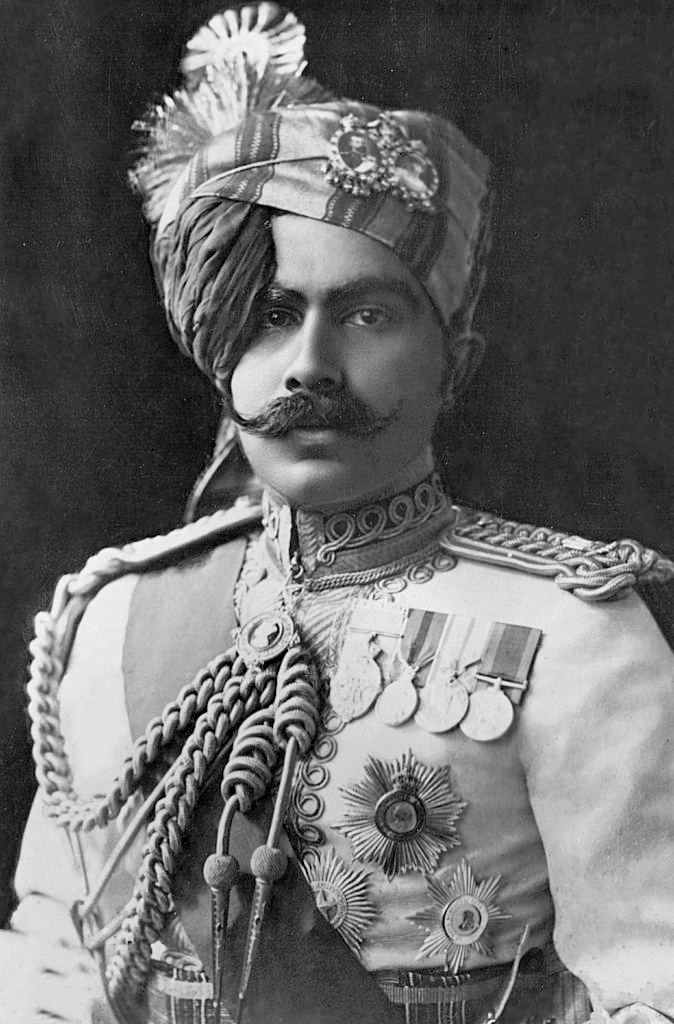
- Maharajah Ganga Singh, c.1930

Maharaja of Bikaner
- Reign: 1888–1943
- Predecessor: Dungar Singh
- Successor: Sadul Singh
- Born: 13 October 1880; Jodhasar, Bikaner State, Rajputana, British India
- Died: 2 February 1943 (aged 62); Bombay, Bombay Presidency, British India
- Consort(s): Vallabh Kanwar Sahiba; Tanwar Maharani Sahiba; Bhatiyani Maharani Ajab Kanwar Sahiba
- Issue: Ram Singh; Chand Kanwar; Sadul Singh; Bijey Singh; Vir Singh; Shiv Kanwar
- House: House of Bikaner
- Dynasty: Rathore dynasty
- Father: Maharaj Shri Lal Singh Sahib of Bikaner (Chattargarh)
- Mother: Rani Shri Chandravati Sahiba

General Maharaja Sir Ganga Singh (13 October 1880 – 2 February 1943) was the ruling Maharaja of the princely state of Bikaner (in present-day Rajasthan, India) from 1888 to 1943. As a member of the Imperial War Cabinet, he was present in the Palace of Versailles during signing of the Treaty of Versailles, formally ending the First World War.

== Early life ==
Ganga Singh was born on the auspicious day of Vijay Dashmi on 13 October 1880 to Maharaj Shri Lal Singh Sahib and his wife Maji Shri Chandravatiji Sahiba. He hailed from Royal Rajput family of Bikaner State. He was brother to Dungar Singh, whom he succeeded on 16 December 1888. He received his early education from Pandit Ram Chandra Dube.

In 1894, Brian Egerton was chosen by Lord Elgin, the Viceroy of India, as the guardian and tutor of Ganga Singh, with the aim of furthering the British interest in Bikaner. On his arrival, in the hot season, Egerton found Ganga Singh living in a palace without electric fans in temperatures above 110 degrees Fahrenheit, but insisted that his place was with his ward. He remained in post until 1899.

Ganga Singh was also educated privately at Mayo College, Ajmer, for five years.

For military training, he was sent to Deoli in 1898 and attached to the 42nd Deoli Regiment, which had the reputation of being one of the finest regiments in India under the command of Lt. Col. Bell.

== Career ==
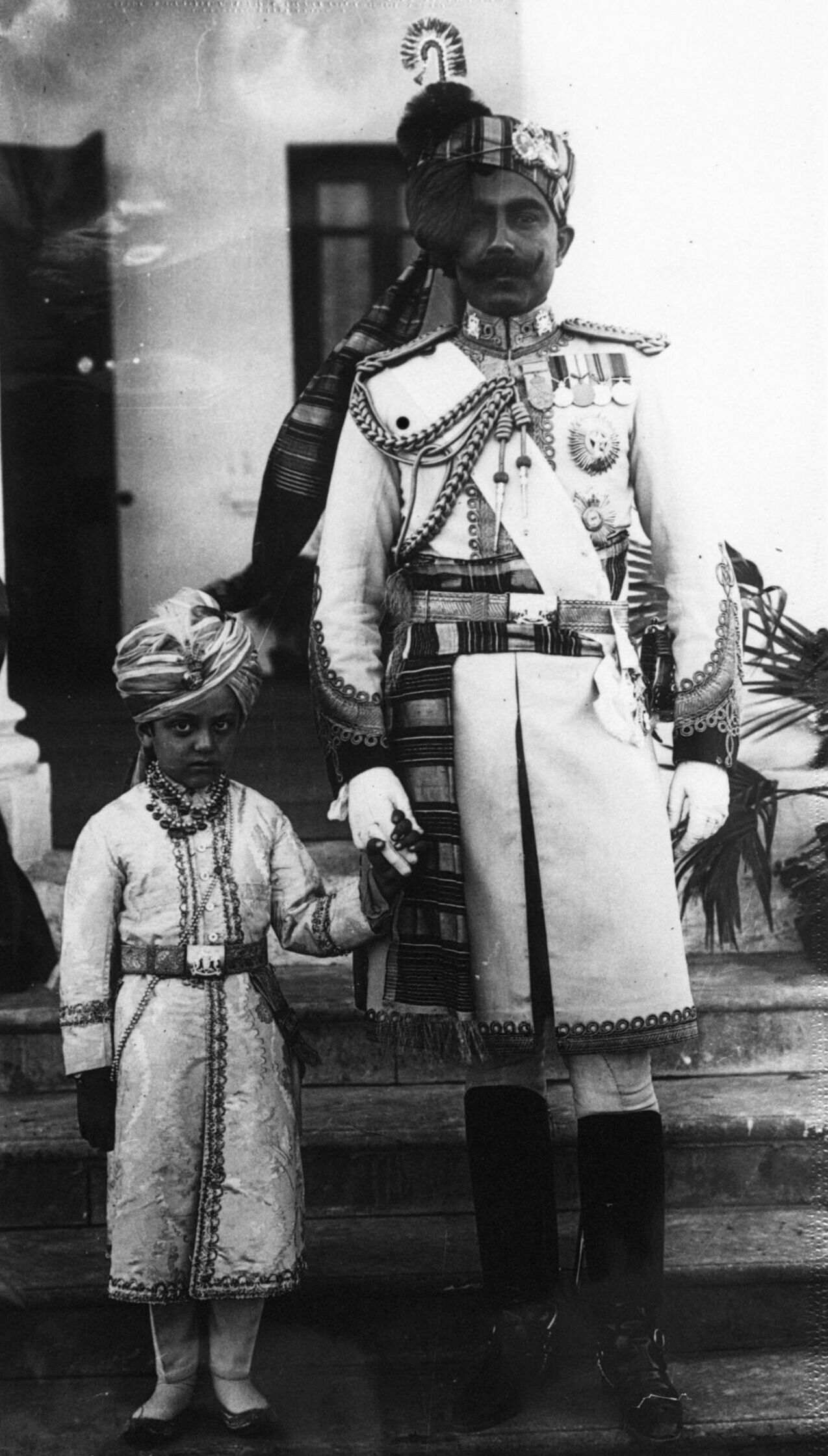
Ganga Singh I of Bikaner with Prince Rafiqullah Khan of Bhopal (grandson of Queen Sultan Jahan of Bhopal) in 1914

Ganga Singh served in China during the Boxer Rebellion of 1900. He was an Honorary Aide-de-camp to the Prince of Wales when he visited the United Kingdom for the Coronation in 1902, and later served him again when he became King George V, the King-Emperor, in 1910. During the First World War, he commanded the Bikaner Camel Corps, which served in France, Egypt, and Palestine. A Member of the Central Recruiting Board for India, 1917, he represented India at the Imperial War Conference 1917, the Imperial War Cabinet, and the Paris Peace Conference of 1919.

As a sovereign ruler, in 1913 he announced the establishment of a Representative Assembly. In 1922, he established a High Court, with a Chief Justice and two sub-judges, giving it a charter of powers. Bikaner was the first State in the Rajputana Agency of princely states to take such a step.

A life insurance and Endowment Assurance Scheme was introduced for the benefit of the employees. Also, facilities of a saving bank were made available to the people. He was one of the first rulers to introduce through legislation a Sharda Act by which child marriages ended.

He had a personal gun salute of 17-guns granted in 1918 and a permanent local gun salute of 19-guns granted in 1921. He was Chancellor of the Indian Chamber of Princes from 1920 to 1926. He also represented India as a delegate at the fifth session of the League of Nations in 1924. As well, the Maharaja served as Patron of Benares Hindu University and Sri Bharat Dharam Mahamandal, as vice-president of East India Association and the Royal Colonial Institute, a Member of the Indian Gymkhana Club and of the Indian Army Temperance Association, the General Council of Mayo and Daly Colleges, the Indian Society of Oriental Art, the Indian Society-London, the Bombay Natural History Society, and was the first Member of the Indian Red Cross Society. Singh was a famous Indian freemason in his time. He was also the third Chairman of the Indian Public Schools Society (The Doon School) from 1929 to 1930.

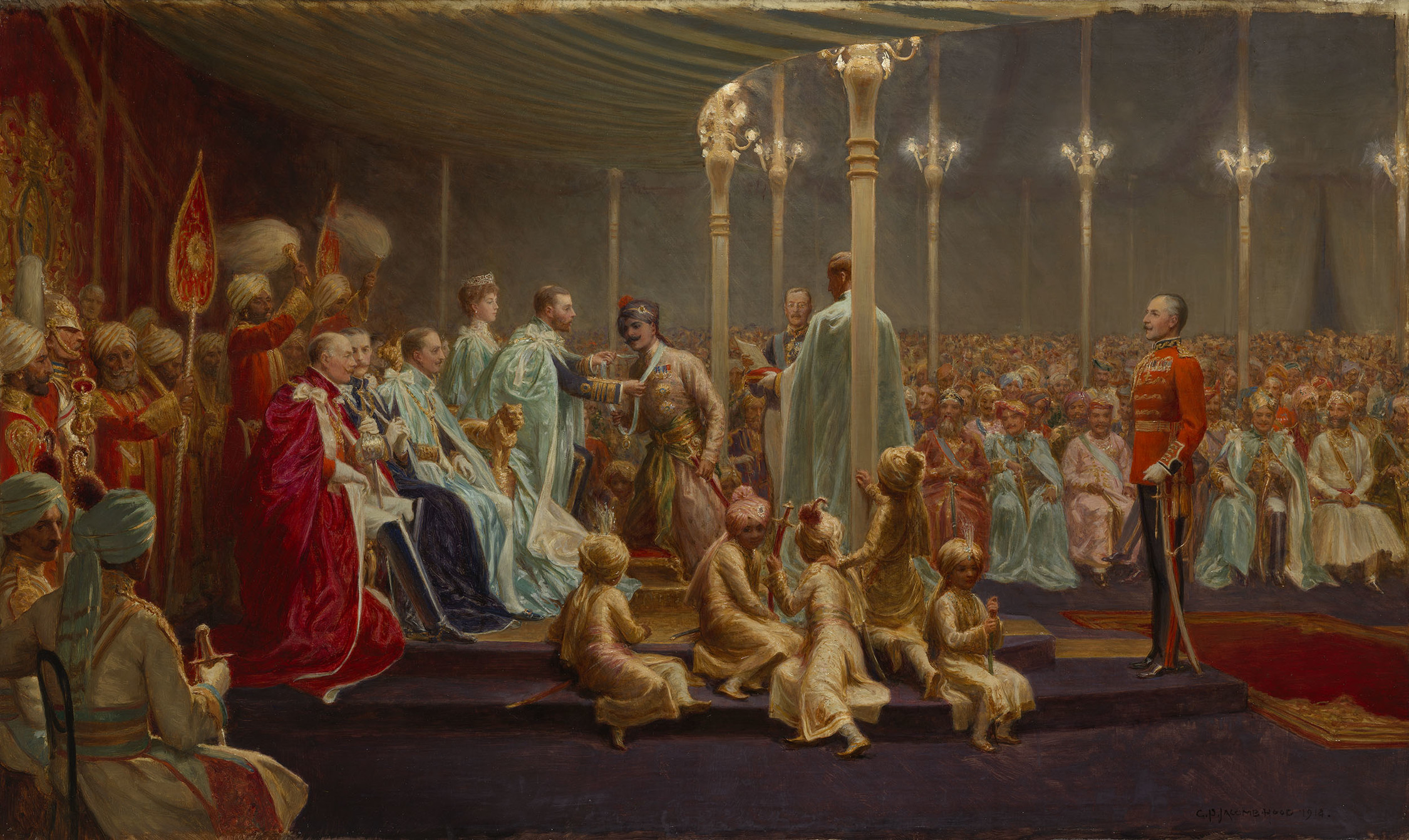
Singh's investiture to the Order of the Star of India in 1911

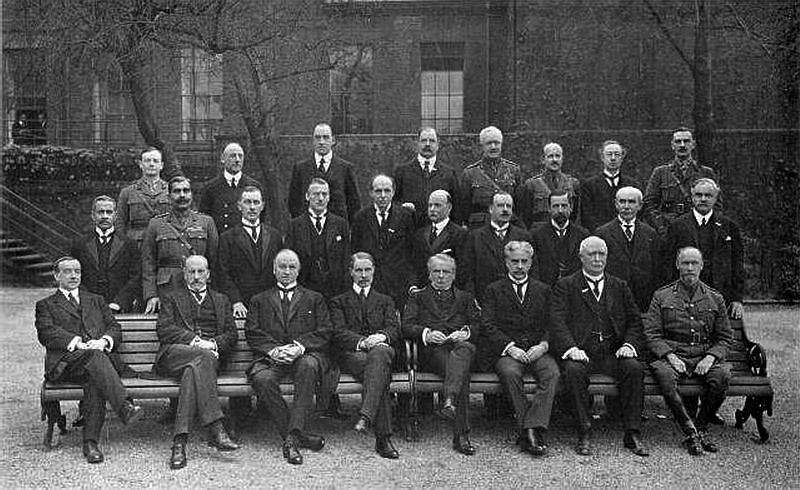
Maharaja Sir Ganga Singh (middle row, second from the left) in the Imperial War Cabinet, No. 10 Downing Street, 1917.

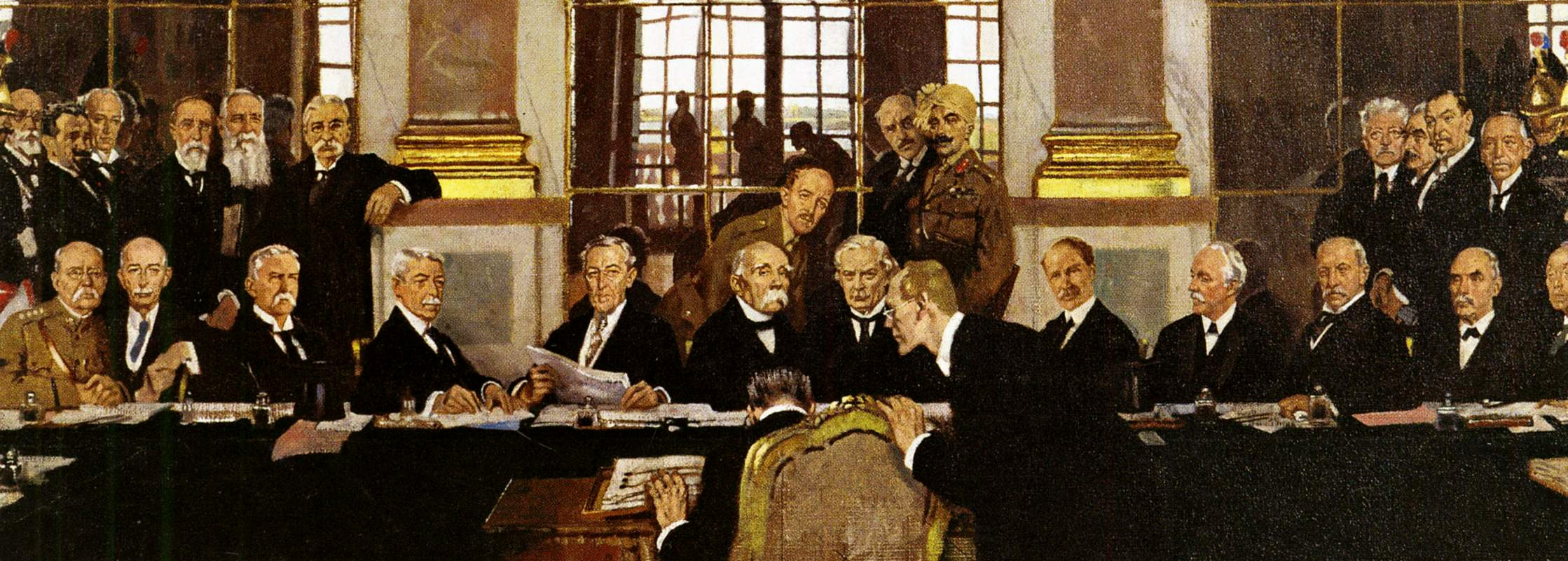
Singh (standing, 6th right) in the Hall of Mirrors during the signing of the Treaty of Versailles, 1919

== Family ==
=== Marriages ===
Maharaja Ganga Singh married three times. In July 1897, he married Maharani Vallabh Kanwar (known in Bikaner as "Maharani Ranawatiji" in honour of her native clan), daughter of Maharawat Raghunath Singh Bahadur, ruler of Pratapgarh State; she bore three children and died in August 1906. In May 1899, Ganga Singh married the daughter of Thakur Sultan Singh of Sanwatsar (a feudal chief under Bikaner state itself). The lady, known in court as "Maharani Tanwarji" in honour of her native clan, died without progeny in 1922. In May 1908, Ganga Singh married Maharani Ajab Kanwar, daughter of Thakur Bahadur Singh of Bhikamkore under Jodhpur state. Known as "Maharani Sri Bhatianiji" in honour of her native clan, she bore three children and died in November 1945, surviving Ganga Singh by more than two years.

=== Children ===
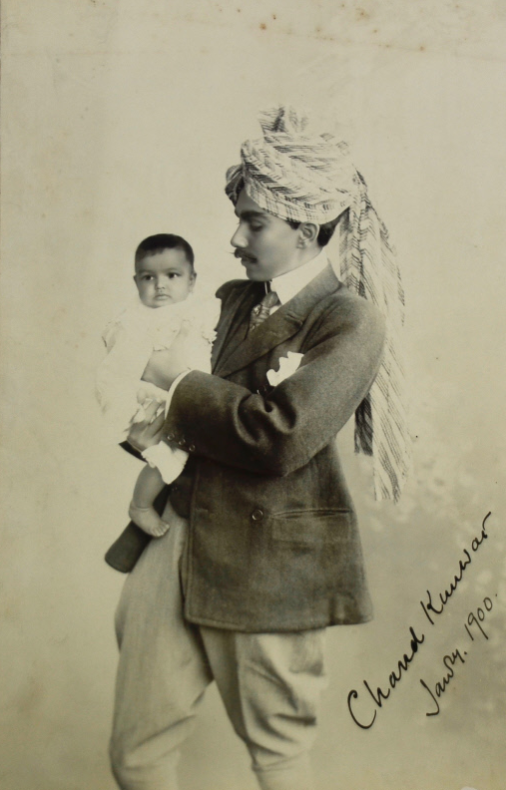
Maharaja of Bikaner with his daughter

Name	Titles	Birth	Death	Notes
Ram Singh	Maharajkumar of Bikaner	30 June 1898	30 June 1898	Born to Maharani Ranawatiji; died within hours of birth
Chand Kanwar	Maharajkumari of Bikaner	1 July 1899	31 July 1915	Born to Maharani Ranawatiji; died of tuberculosis at the Bhowali sanatorium aged 16
Sadul Singh	Yuvaraj of Bikaner, later His Highness the Maharaja Sahib of Bikaner.	7 September 1902	25 September 1950	Born to Maharani Ranawatiji. Succeeded his father as Maharaja of Bikaner. Reigned from 2 February 1943 until his death in 1950.
Bijey Singh	Maharajkumar of Bikaner, later Maharaj of Chhatargarh	28 March 1909	11 February 1932	Born to Maharani Bhatianiji. Selected to succeed to the estates of his natural grandfather (Ganga Singh's biological father), Maharaj Shri Lal Singh.
Veer Singh	Maharajkumar of Bikaner	7 October 1910	27 March 1911	Born to Maharani Bhatianiji. Died in infancy.
Shiv Kanwarji	1916 – 1930: Maharajkumari of Bikaner; 1930 – 1940: Yuvarani of Kotah; 1940 – 1991: Maharani of Kotah; 1991 –2012 : Rajmata of Kotah	1 March 1916	12 January 2012	Born to Maharani Bhatianiji. Given in marriage to the future Maharaja Bhim Singh II of Kotah in April 1930, aged 14.

Siblings

Ganga Singh had 2 elder brothers

- Maharaja Dungar Singh whom he succeeded as Maharaja of Bikaner.
- Rajkumar Gulab Singh who died as a child.

Cousins

- The cadet branches within the Bikaner Royal Family are Ridi & Tejrasar branches of the House of Bikaner. Maharaj Nahar Singh & Colonel Maharaj Sir Bhairon Singh were Maharaja Ganga Singh's paternal cousins and their children his closest family. He had two more cousins who were equal in decree of distance to Maharaj Nahar Singh & Maharaj Bhairon Singh but they died without any children and long before Maharaja Ganga Singh was even born. They were Maharaj Jaswant Singh & Maharaj Jawani Singh.
- Maharana Shambu Singh, the 29th Maharana of Udaipur-Mewar was his paternal cousin via his paternal aunt Rani Nand Kanwar who was married to Maharaj Sadul Singh of Bagore branch (a then cadet branch of the Udaipur Royal Family) of the House of Mewar.
- Not much is known about his maternal cousins.

== Death ==
He died on 2 February 1943 in Bombay after a reign of 56 years, aged 62, and was succeeded by his son Sadul Singh as His Highness the Maharaja Sahib of Bikaner.

== Achievements ==
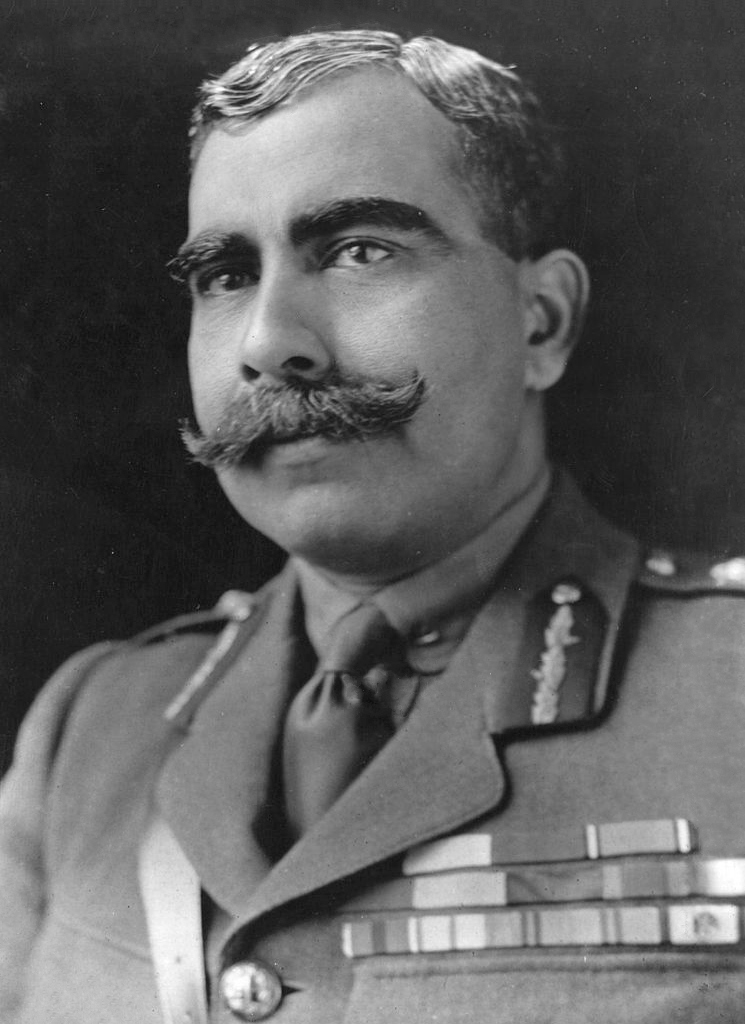
Ganga Singh in 1919

- Ganga Singh constructed the Ganga Canal. He inspired people to come and settle in this new Command area. A large population settled there from the surrounding areas of Punjab. Among them, the Sikh families, mostly landowners, migrated to the region in the 1920s, when the canal was built by Maharaja Ganga Singh of the former Bikaner state and brought waters of the Satluj River from the adjoining Ferozepur District in Punjab. There were no permanent settlements in the area except for a few towns under the old Bikaner state.
- He successfully dealt with the worst famine of the year 1899–1900 AD in the region. The famine inspired the young Maharaja to establish an irrigation system to get rid of the problem permanently.
- He developed the city of Sri Ganganagar and its surrounding area as the most fertile grain bowl of Rajasthan.
- He also constructed the Lalgarh Palace at Bikaner (named in memory of his father Lall Singh) between 1902 and 1926.
- He brought railways and an electricity network to the state.
- He introduced prison reforms. Bikaner prisoners wove and crafted carpets of India that were sold in the international markets.
- He established partial internal democracy such as election to the municipalities and appointed a council of ministers to aid and advice.
- Some land reforms were also introduced.
- He induced enterprising industrialists and agriculturists from neighbouring state for starting new ventures in his state.
- He built the existing temple above the Samadhi of Ramdev Pir at Ramdevra in year 1931.
- He founded several schools and colleges, especially of women
- He donated two ornately designed silver gates to be used as main doors of Karni Mata Temple at Deshnok.

== Memorials ==
The University of Bikaner was renamed after him as Maharaja Ganga Singh University, Bikaner by an act passed in 2003.

== See also ==
- List of Rajputs
- List of famous big game hunters

Ganga Singh Rathore Dynasty Born: 3 October 1880 Died: 2 February 1943
Regnal titles
Preceded by Dungar Singh	Maharaja of Bikaner; 1887–1943	Succeeded by Sadul Singh
