= GPF =

GPF may refer to:

== Military ==
- Canon de 155mm GPF, a French heavy artillery gun
- General Purpose Frigate (Canada)
- Gozarto Protection Force, a Syrian militia

== Organizations ==
- Global Peace Foundation
- Global Philanthropy Forum
- Global Policy Forum, an American international government accountability organization

== Sports ==
- Global Pickleball Federation
- Grand Prix of Figure Skating Final

== Other ==
- Gallons per flush*, a measure of flush toilet water efficiency
- General protection fault, a computer error on the Intel x86 architecture
- Greater palatine foramen
- Grosse Pointe Farms
- Yaroslavl Global Policy Forum, an international forum
