= Yaroslavl =

City in Yaroslavl Oblast, Russia

Yaroslavl Ярославль
- City
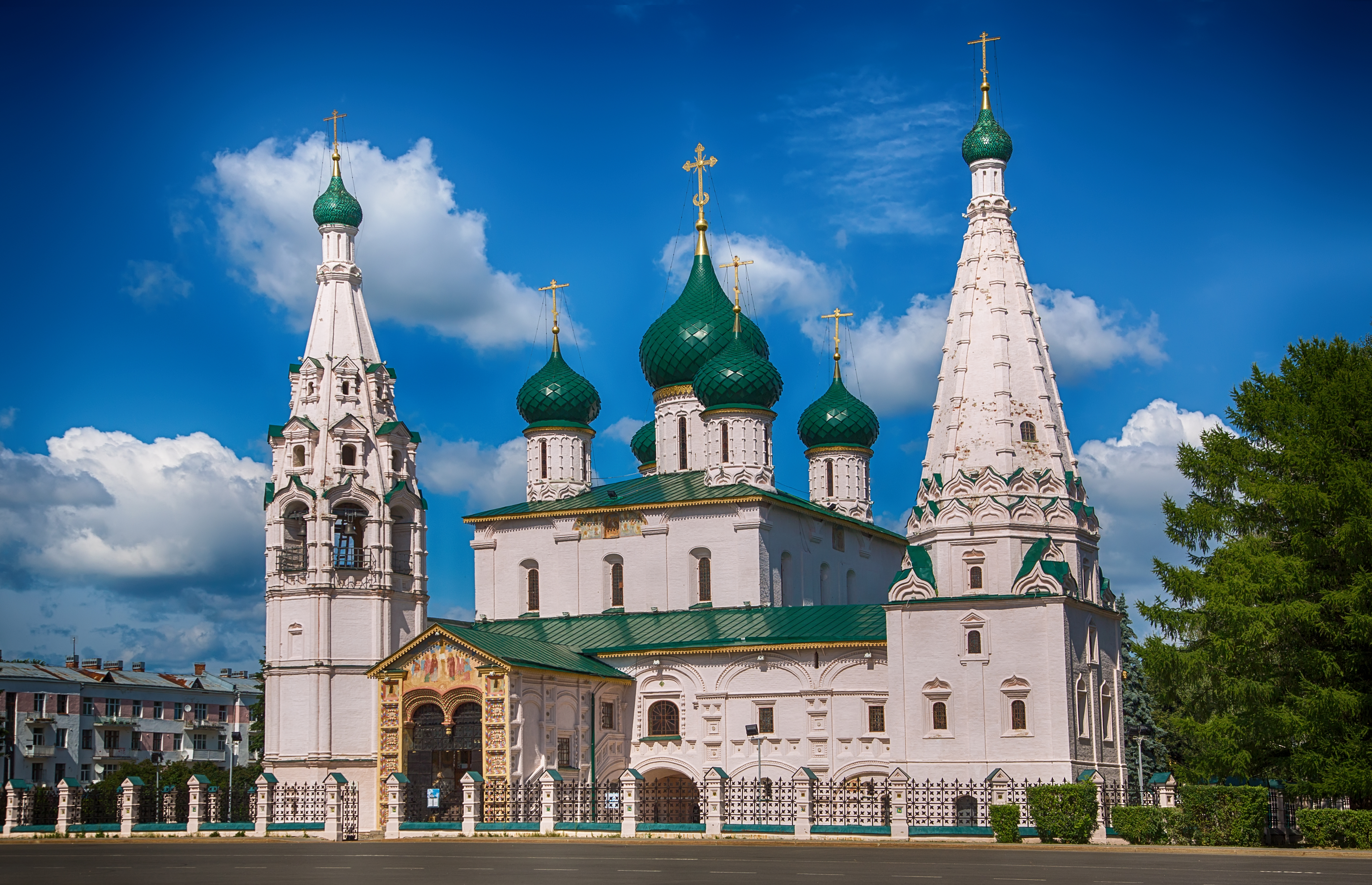
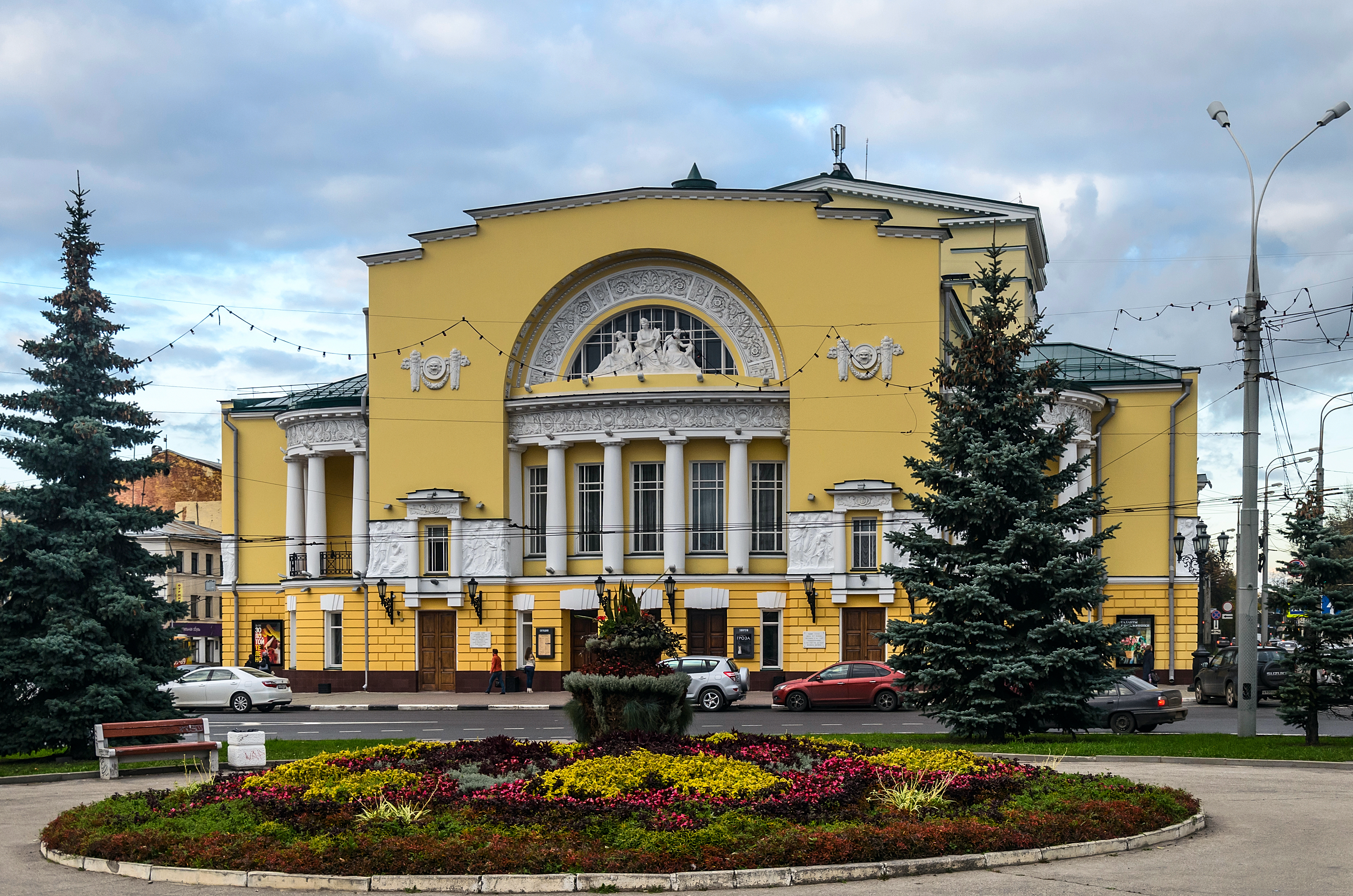
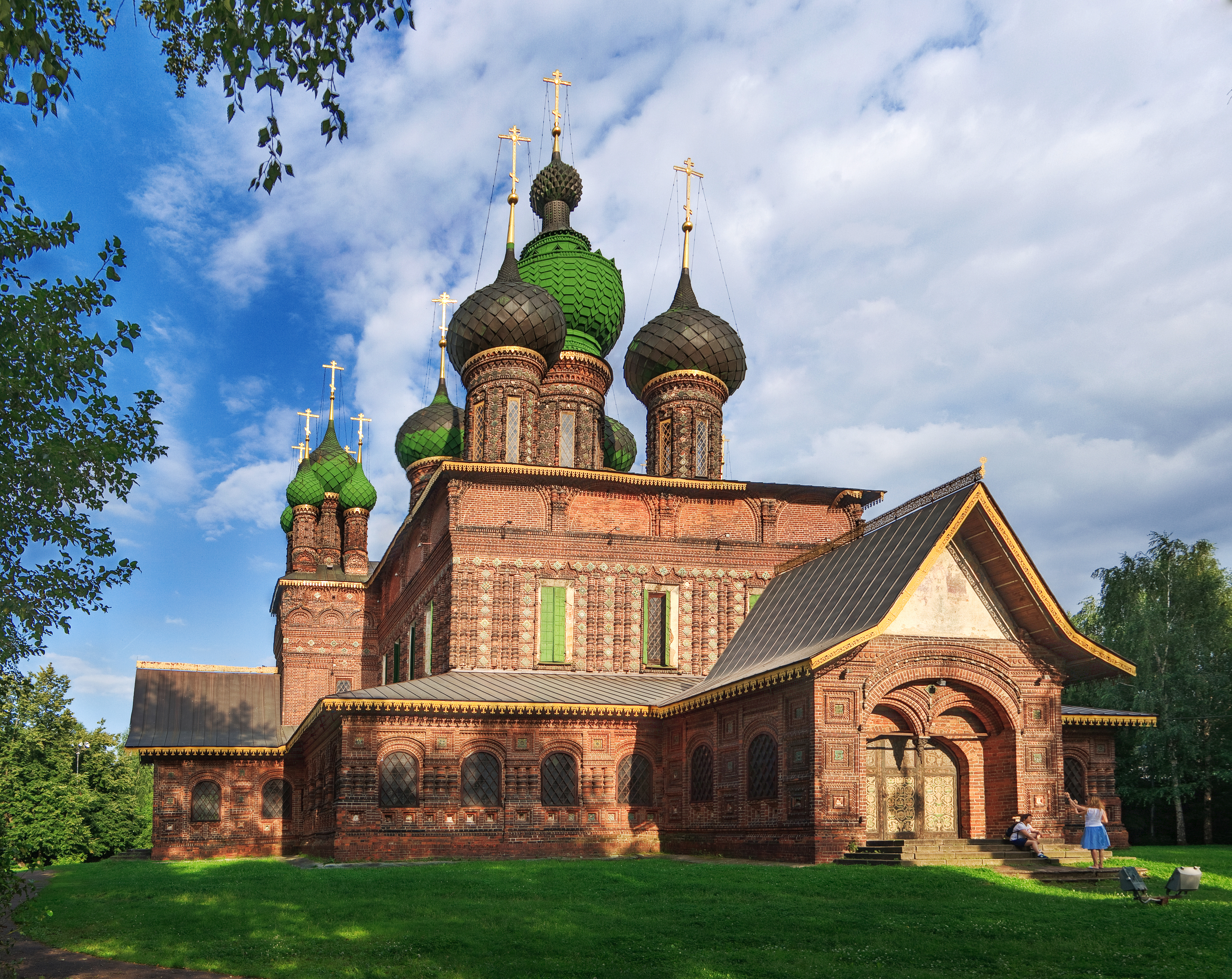
- Yaroslavl monument St. Elijah the Prophet's Church Volkov Theater St. John the Baptist's Church Znamenskaya Tower Strelka Park from Volga Embankment

- Flag Coat of arms
- Interactive map of Yaroslavl
- Location of Yaroslavl Yaroslavl (European Russia) Yaroslavl (Europe)
- Coordinates: 57°37′35″N 39°53′36″E
- Country: Russia
- Federal subject: Yaroslavl Oblast
- Founded: 1010

Government
  - Body: City Duma
  - Mayor: Artyom Molchanov

Area
  - Total: 205.80 km^{2} (79.46 sq mi)
- Elevation: 100 m (330 ft)

Population (2010 Census)
  - Total: 591,486
  - Estimate (2025): 608,353 (+2.9%)
  - Rank: 23rd in 2010
  - Density: 2,874.1/km^{2} (7,443.8/sq mi)

Administrative status
  - Subordinated to: city of oblast significance of Yaroslavl
  - Capital of: Yaroslavl Oblast, Yaroslavsky District

Municipal status
  - Urban okrug: Yaroslavl Urban Okrug
  - Capital of: Yaroslavl Urban Okrug, Yaroslavsky Municipal District
- Time zone: UTC+3 (MSK)
- Postal code: 150000—150066
- Dialing code: +7 4852
- OKTMO ID: 78701000001
- Website: city-yaroslavl.ru

UNESCO World Heritage Site
- Official name: Historical Centre of the City of Yaroslavl
- Criteria: Cultural: ii, iv
- Reference: 1170
- Inscription: 2005 (29th Session)
- Area: 110 ha (270 acres)
- Buffer zone: 580 ha (1,400 acres)

Yaroslavl (Note: Alternatively romanized as Jaroslavlj and Yaroslavľ.) (/ˌjærəˈslævəl/; Russian: Ярославль, IPA: [jɪrɐˈsɫavlʲ]) is a city and the administrative center of Yaroslavl Oblast, Russia, located 250 kilometers (160 mi) northeast of Moscow. The historic part of the city is a World Heritage Site, and is located at the confluence of the Volga and the Kotorosl rivers. It is part of the Golden Ring, a group of historic cities northeast of Moscow that have played an important role in Russian history. The population of the city at the 2021 census was 577,279.

== History ==
Reportedly the capital of an independent Principality of Yaroslavl from 1218, it was incorporated into the Grand Duchy of Moscow in 1463 (de jure 1471).

In the 17th century, it was Russia's second-largest city, and for a time (during the Polish occupation of Moscow in 1612), the country's de facto capital. Today, Yaroslavl is an important industrial center (petrochemical plant, tire manufacturing plant, diesel engines plant and many others). It developed at the confluence of major rivers, which were important for transportation and, later, for power. Because of the city's importance, several major railways and later highways were constructed to intersect here.

=== Early Yaroslavl ===
The oldest settlement in the city is to be found on the left bank of the Volga River in front of the Strelka (a small cape at the confluence of the Volga and Kotorosl); this dates from the 5th–3rd millennium BCE.

In the 9th century the so-called Rus' Khaganate formed, near Yaroslavl, a large Scandinavian-Slavic settlement in Timerevo. It is known for a surviving range of burial mounds. When excavations were carried out, a large number of artifacts, including Scandinavian weapons with runic inscriptions, chess pieces, and the largest collection of Arabian coins (treasure) in northern Europe (the earliest were struck in the first Idrisid), were found. In Timerevo the fourth set of Scandinavian brooches ever found in Russia was discovered. Apparently, this "proto-Yaroslavl" was a major center for the Volga trade route. Soon after the founding of Yaroslavl, the settlement went into decline, probably in connection with the termination of the operation of the Volga trade route. Upstream of the Volga River, just outside the boundaries of the modern city, archaeologists have studied a large necropolis with a predominance of ordinary graves of the Finno-Ugric-type.

=== Foundation of the city ===
Based on its earliest date of foundation, Yaroslavl is the oldest of all the existing towns on the Volga. Yaroslavl was founded by Yaroslav the Wise, a prince of Kievan Rus', during the period of his ruling the Principality of Rostov (988—1010) when he stepped ashore for the first time near the area now known as 'Strelka.' This is used as a contemporary park. On this spot, which was well protected from attack by the high, steep banks of the Volga, Kotorosl and Medveditsa rivers, Yaroslavl and his men began to set about building the first Yaroslavl Kremlin. The first recorded event of Yaroslavl occurred as a result of famine; it was recorded as the Rostov Uprising of 1071. The name of the city is traditionally linked to that of its founder: Yaroslav.

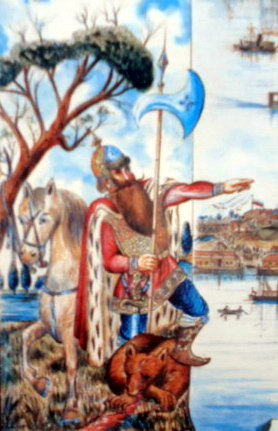
Yaroslav the Wise stands over the body of the bear which he, according to legend, killed before founding the city

By the 12th century, the Petropavlovsky and Spaso-Preobrazhensky monasteries of Yaroslavl had already been developed. At that time, they were located well beyond the city limits, but the city later grew to encompass these institutions. During its first two centuries, Yaroslavl remained a minor fortified city of the Rostov-Suzdal lands.

From the beginning of the thirteenth century, Yaroslavl was ruled by the lordship of Konstantin and became one of his primary residences. Just before his death in 1218, Konstantin broke up his land among his various sons, bequeathing the Yaroslave land to his second son Vsevolod. The son ruled it as the Principality of Yaroslavl. This principality, of which Yaroslavl became the capital, included a number of territories to the north and operated independently until its eventual absorption in 1463 into the Principality of Moscow.

During the thirteenth and fourteenth centuries, Yaroslavl was a city largely built from wood, as a result of which it often found itself plagued by disastrous fires, which in some cases almost destroyed the entire city, a good example of which would be that which took place just before the transfer of power in the city to Vsevolod on 1221. Another constant source of danger for the city and for the many Russian princes of the time came from the East and the many foreign invaders, usually from the Mongol Horde. A particularly successful attack took place in 1257, when troops from the Golden Horde under Möngke Khan overran the Principality of Yaroslavl and murdered both the larger population of the area and the prince's close family. On the site of that unfortunate event, on the right bank of the Kotorosl, there is now a memorial church and cross. A mass grave containing at least 300 bodies of victims of a Mongol invasion in the year 1238, was discovered during an excavation in 2005.

In 1293 and 1322 there were further disastrous attacks on Yaroslavl launched by the Golden Horde, and in 1278 and 1364 the Plague struck. On many an occasion Yaroslavl had to be completely rebuilt, both in terms of residential buildings which no longer exist, to those larger more permanent structures which remain to this day, such as the Spaso-Preobrazhensky Monastery and 1314 Monastery of Maria of Tolga, which is located on the left bank of the Volga. In 1463 the Principality of Yaroslavl was finally absorbed into the Grand-duchy of Moscow, with the area it once covered becoming an oblast within the new structure of the Muscovite state. From this point onwards the history of the city and its lands became completely inseparable from that of Moscow and eventually Russia.

=== 16th century and the Time of Troubles ===
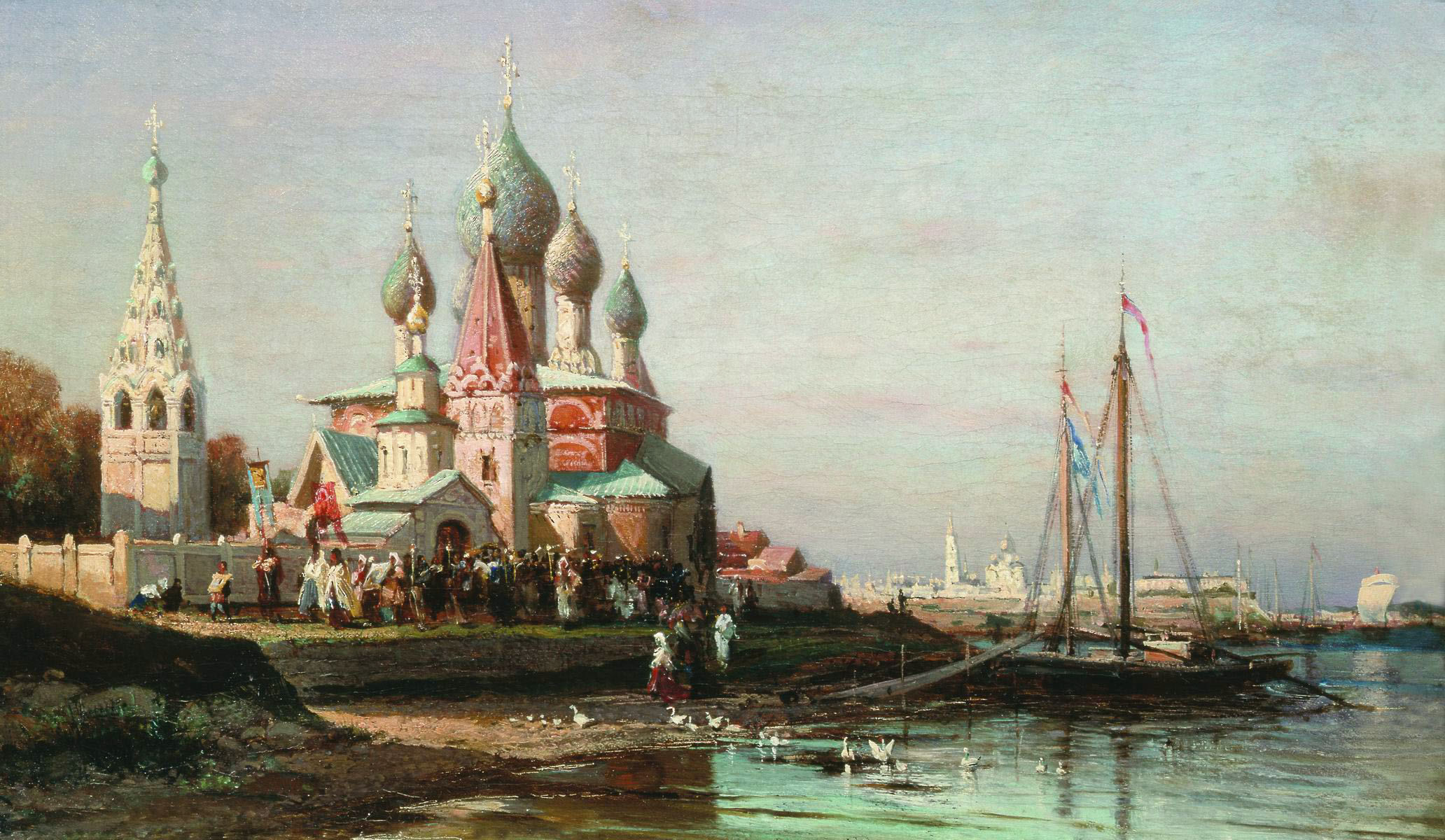
Alexey Bogolyubov. A Crucession in Yaroslavl, painted in 1863

Even in the 16th century, Yaroslavl continued to suffer from large scale fires and the damage they did to the city's developing economy and infrastructure. As a result, the age old tradition of building in wood was abandoned and a new city built of stone began to appear; unfortunately, this meant that very little of the Yaroslavl of the Middle Ages remained unchanged. The most prominent example of this is the Spaso-Preobrazhensky monastery which was destroyed in 1501 and rebuilt in just under a few years. Resultantly the monastery's cathedral was built up in 1506–1516, a building which remains, to this day, the oldest unchanged building in the city. By the middle of the sixteenth century, a number of other building works had been completed in the monastery, also, other than this, for the first time in its history, Yaroslavl gained a stone-built wall with a number of large watchtowers which were intended to be used to spot attackers from miles away. During the reign of Ivan the Terrible, when all the Russian principalities gave up their traditional rights and submitted to the Tsardom of Russia, the two large monasteries of Yaroslavl profited very much from rich gifts from the court of the Tsar, largely because Ivan IV made a number of pilgrimages to Yaroslavl over the course of his life.

New building works were also made affordable by a large upswing in Yaroslavl's economic fortunes which the city experienced in the middle part of the 16th century. The main reason for this largely unexpected improvement in Yaroslavl's fortunes came largely from the city's position on the Volga which allowed trade to be brought from and to Moscow via the river, linking the new Russian capital with the port of Arkhangelsk. Resultantly Yaroslavl became an important place for the conduct of international trade and a number of shipping berths and warehouses grew up around the city for the use of merchants, especially those from England and Germany.

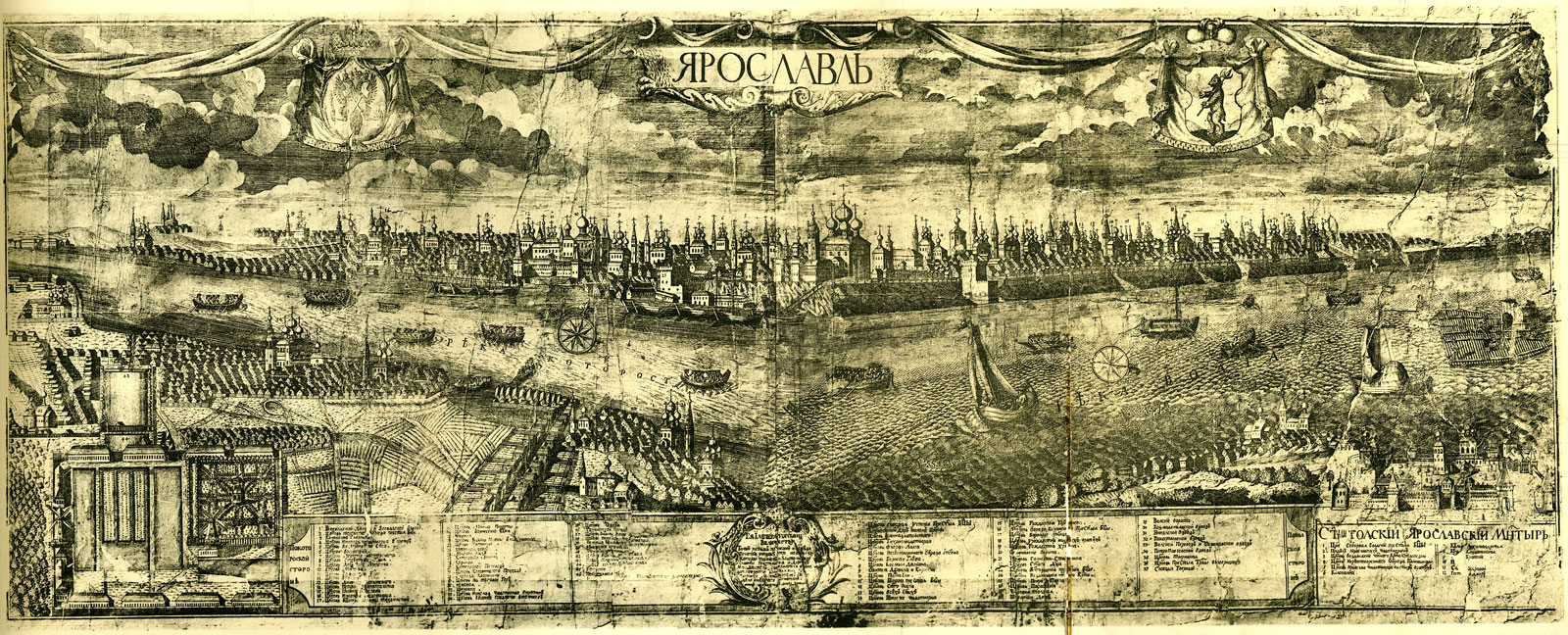
Yaroslavl used to be known as the city of many churches

The economic prosperity of Yaroslavl during the late 16th century was put to an end by the unsteady years of troubles which lasted from around 1598 until 1613. Like most Russian cities of the time, Yaroslavl was devastated by famine and became a potential target city for Polish-Lithuanian troops acting in their capacity as 'interventionists' in the troubled Russian state. The Polish-Lithuanian-supported pretender to the Russian throne captured Karachev, Bryansk, and other towns, was reinforced by the Poles, and in the spring of 1608 advanced upon Moscow, routing the army of Tsar Vasily Shuisky at Bolkhov. Promises of the wholesale confiscation of the estates of the boyars drew many common people to his side. The village of Tushino, twelve versts from the capital, was converted into an armed camp where Dmitry gathered his army. Resultantly this pretender won the appreciation of the powers in Yaroslavl and thus their loyalty. However, despite having promised to pay a higher rate of taxes and dues to the Polish occupiers, Yaroslavl was on numerous occasions plundered by the forces of the pretender Dmitry. This led to a number of popular uprisings. Thus in early 1609, a Russian peasant army was formed to free as many of the Volga's cities as possible, including, among others, Vologda and Yaroslavl.

In May 1609, another Polish army under the command of Aleksander Józef Lisowski tried to bring the strategically important city of Yaroslavl under the power of the invaders. However, the majority of the city's citizens had withdrawn into the center of the city and found refuge behind the protective earthen wall, thus denying the Poles entry without a fight. Yet even when Lisowski successfully (through deceit) managed to get behind this wall, he found that the citizens of Yaroslavl had retreated into their ancient wooden Kremlin and the two stone-built monasteries. The ensuing siege of Yaroslavl lasted until May 22, but despite constant attempts to take the city, the Poles had to return to Moscow having not fulfilled their duty to bring Yaroslavl under direct control of their command.

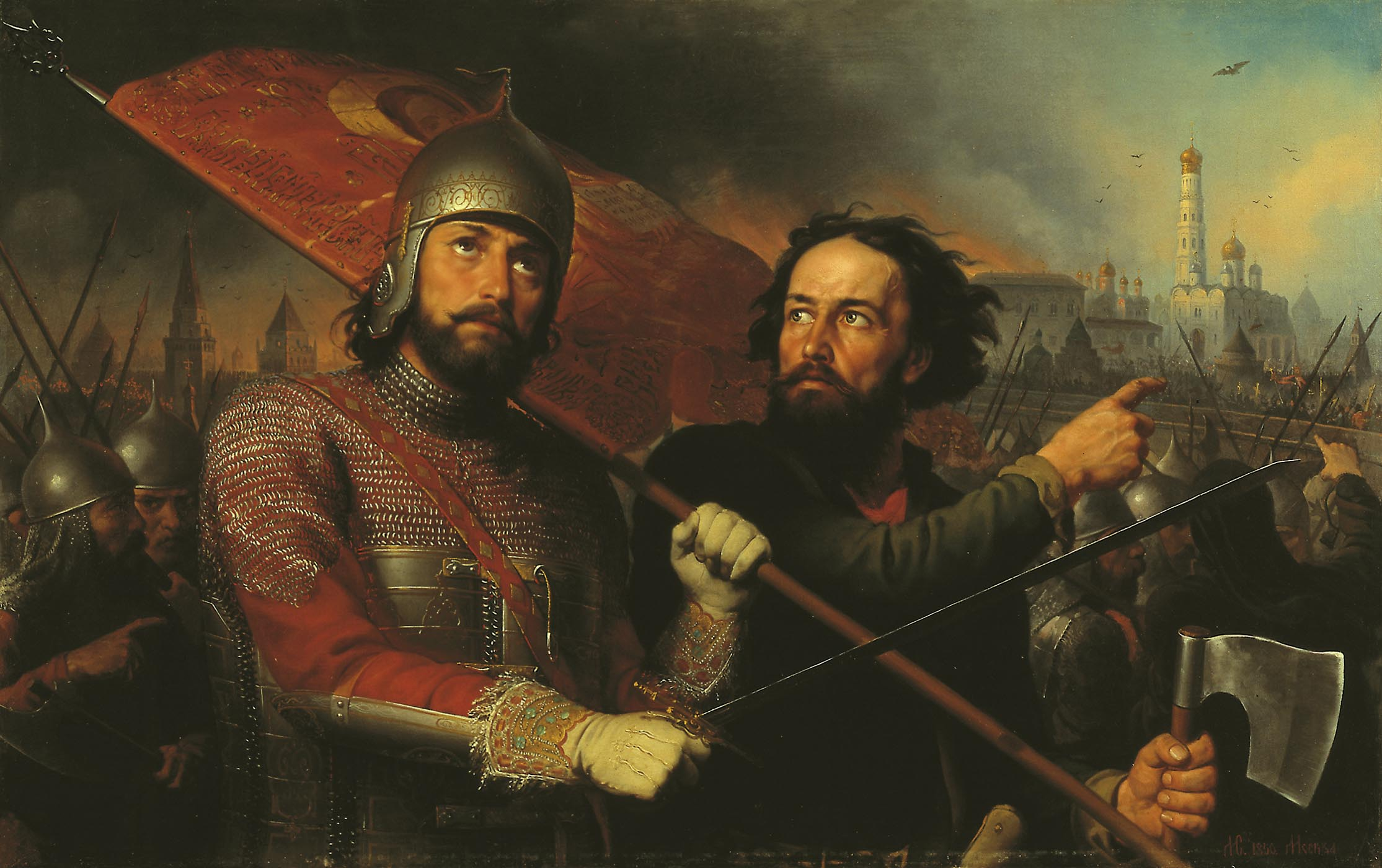
Minin and Pozharsky, whilst on their way to relieve Moscow, made Yaroslavl their base and thus de facto capital of Russia for two months in 1612

Despite their failure at Yaroslavl, Polish forces remained in control of Moscow, and despite an attempt in 1610 by the Russian peasants' army to unseat the Poles from the Moscow Kremlin, little was accomplished and there seemed no end in sight for the occupation of the Russian tsardom. One year later, however, Kuzma Minin and Prince Dmitry Pozharsky founded yet another peasants' army in Nizhny Novgorod, that on the way to Moscow, found itself stationed in Yaroslavl for many months. In this time from April to June 1612, Yaroslavl became the de facto capital of Russia, since in this place the most important matters of state were settled until the eventual liberation of Moscow came. After its time in Yaroslavl the peasants' army moved on towards Moscow, and with thanks to the rest and help they had received voluntarily from the people of Yaroslavl, the army was able to liberate Moscow and finally put an end to the Polish-Lithuanian 'intervention' in the affairs of the Russian state.

=== Trading post and government center ===
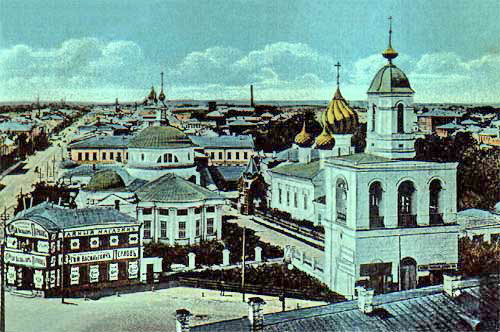
Yaroslavl's Volkov Square as it would have appeared before the reconstruction of the Volkov Theater in the early 1900s

With the general economic revival of the Russian state's economy after the end of the Troubles, Yaroslavl continued to be an important trading post and retained its place on the route of numerous traditional trading routes from the West to East and vice versa. By way of the Volga trade was carried out with the lands of the Orient. The northern trade route through the city ran to the port of Arkhangelsk in Russia's far north, whilst other Eastern trade lines ran East over the Urals to Siberia. The town benefited very much from its geographical location over the years and the wealth which business produced for the town helped ensure its prosperous future. In fact, in the 17th century, a number of early industrial concerns were set up in the city, including a number of leather-working shops, in which around 700 people eventually came to work. Other trades for which Yaroslavl became a center over the years were in the production of textiles, cosmetics (fragrances) and silver work.

As a result of the prosperity enjoyed by the city, Yaroslavl saw a huge expansion in the size of its population over the course of the 17th century, and by the end of this century, the town had a population of around 15,000 people, making it the second-largest city of the Russian Tsardom after Moscow. This period was also particularly important for the urban development of the city because during the 17th century a multitude of stone-walled churches were built in the city; today these churches still form a major part of the old town's city center. Work on most of these churches was begun with funds gifted to the city by rich local merchants, and thus they had a large say in what form the buildings would eventually take.

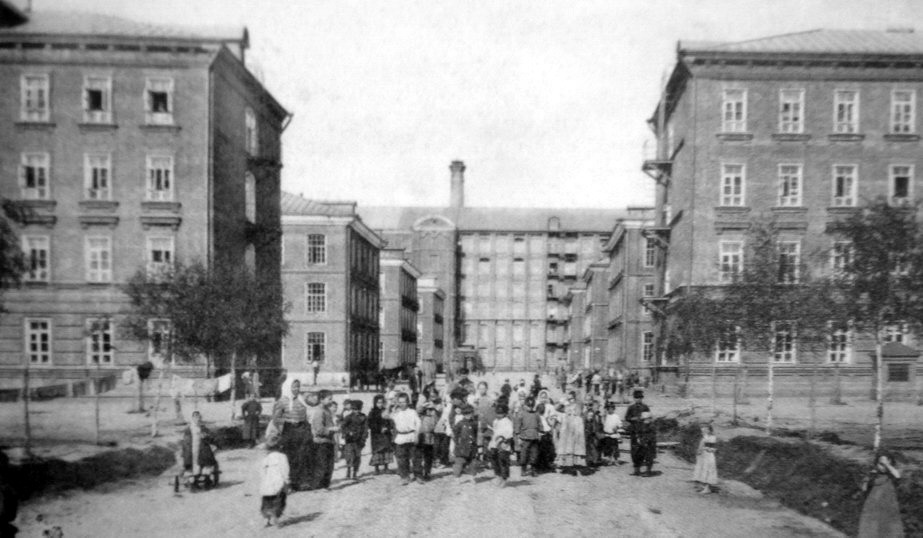
The living quarters and workplace for employees of Yaroslavl's first major industrial enterprise, the city's textiles plant

In 1658, Yaroslavl endured a disastrous fire that destroyed most of the city's few remaining wooden buildings, including the ancient Kremlin. From this point onwards the city began to develop in the same way as it has done up to this very day, as a city built almost exclusively out of brick and mortar.

At the beginning of the 18th century Yaroslavl finally began to transform itself from a trading post into a major industrial town; this largely came about because with the foundation by Peter the Great of Saint Petersburg in 1703, the importance of Arkhangelsk as a port on the Northern Ocean was drastically decreased, and the amount of trade being channeled through the city for export fell accordingly. Luckily, the wealth which Yaroslavl had amassed over its many years as an important trading post allowed it to invest great amounts of money into the development of the city's new industrial base, and thus make the city very attractive to new investors. In 1772 the textiles factory of Ivan Tames opened on the right bank of the Kotorosl. This plant was not only Yaroslavl's first major industrial enterprise but also one of Russia's largest textiles producers. The establishment still exists today under the name 'Textile factory 'Krasny Perekop' (russ. Красный Перекоп). In addition to the rise in textile manufacturing, Yaroslavl's traditional position as a center for skilled leatherwork remained unchanged.

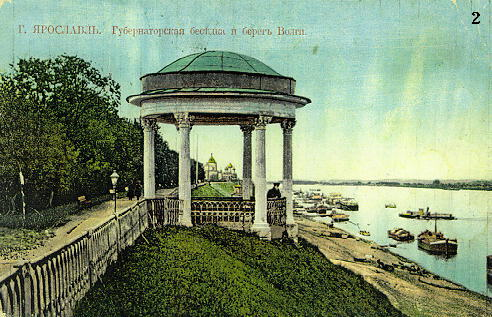
Volga-Promenade with decorative Pavilion. A postcard from 1915.

In the 1770s, as a result of the city's economic development and ever-rising population, the city became a major provincial center, thus in the course of the Russian Empire's administrative reforms under Catherine the Great Yaroslavl, in 1777, became the center of its own governorate, and in 1778 received its own grant of arms. In 1796, the city finally became the seat of one of the Empire's new governorates. As an administrative center of the highest order, Yaroslavl, in 1778, received its own plan for urban development specially drawn out by Ivan Starov. This led to another wave of building works in the city, the results of which are still visible in the city today. With the Ilyinskaya Square and Church of Elijah the Prophet at its center, the new plan called for the development of a network of long boulevards and streets that would be bordered by large classical-style buildings and numerous city parks. A prominent example of this later development is the former House of Charity (built in 1786), which is now one of the buildings of the city's 'Demidov' State University.

For Yaroslavl, the 19th meant a period of intensive building work, infrastructural development and industrialization. In 1803 the 'School of Higher Sciences' was opened, this was the city's first educational institute and is recognized as the forerunner to the city's current state university. In 1812 the first permanent bridge (built near the Transfiguration Monastery) over the Kotorosl was finished, and by 1820 the city's Volga embankment was stabilized and turned into a large shaded promenade. Also, other major classicist building works were started, among which was the Governor's House (1821–1823) (today location of the city's gallery). In 1860 Yaroslavl was finally connected, through Moscow, via telegraph to the other major cities of Russia, and this was then soon followed, in 1870, by the building of Yaroslavl's first railway station and inauguration of Yaroslavl-Moscow railway. In 1873 the city gained municipal waterworks and by 1900 an electrified tramway. Just before the end of the 19th century in 1897, Yaroslavl had a recorded population of around 71,600 people.

=== 20th century and millennium ===
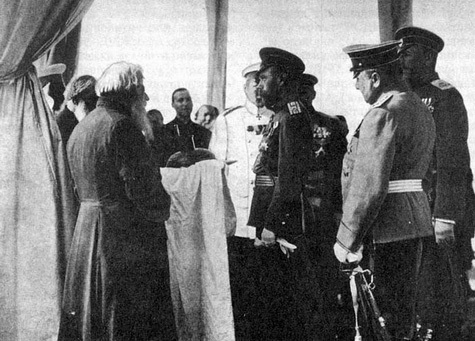
Nicholas II in Yaroslavl for the 300th anniversary of the House of Romanov.

Right up until the beginning of the First World War Yaroslavl remained a large industrial town with a well-developed municipal infrastructure. However, the effects of the 1917 October Revolution were wide-reaching, and after the Russian Civil War of 1917–1920 the city's economy suffered rather drastically; this led to a significant contraction of the city's population. The Yaroslavl Rebellion, which lasted from July 6 to 21, 1918 had particularly grave consequences. In this event, a group of conservative activists tried to remove the newly installed Bolshevik municipal authorities through an armed intervention. The rebels managed to secure a number of large parts of the city, however, this led only to an assault by the Red Army which saw the city surrounded, cut off from supplies and bombarded day and night with artillery and air forces. The rebellion was eventually put down, and ended with official figures putting the number of deaths among the city's residents at about 600, in addition to which around 2,000 of the city's buildings were either destroyed or badly damaged.

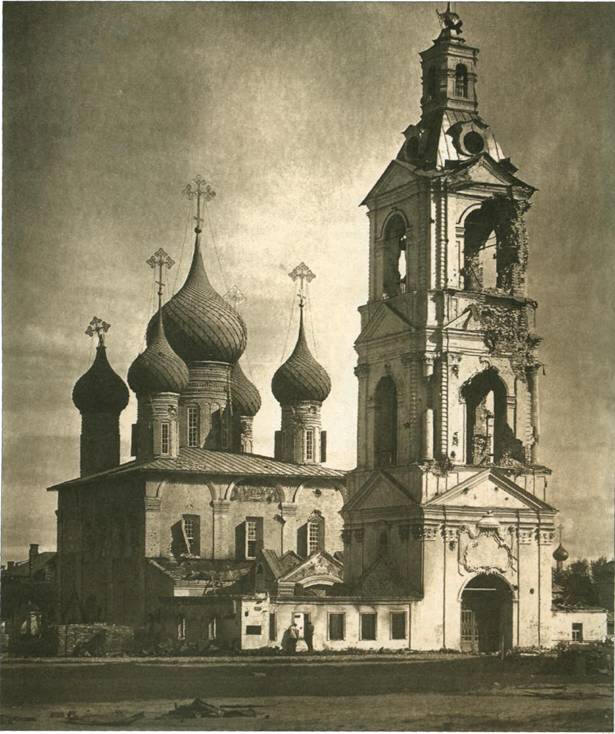
Yaroslavl's Ascension Church, which was badly damaged during the Yaroslavl Uprising

The economy of Yaroslavl took part in the early Soviet Union's program of accelerated industrialization. Milestones for this period include the opening of the city's first municipal power plant in 1926, the beginning of Synthetic rubber mass production in factory SK-1, the reestablishment of domestic production facilities for the production of automobile and aircraft tires in the 1928-founded Yaroslavl Tyre Factory, and the opening of the rubber-asbestos combined works in 1933. In addition to all this, the Yaroslavl Automobile Works (founded 1916) continued to produce vehicles, including a number for the municipal transport administration of Moscow, well into the 1930s.

During the years of World War II, Yaroslavl managed to escape the prospect of German occupation, since the Wehrmacht did not manage to break through the Soviet defense lines surrounding Moscow. However, due to its location as a large transportation hub, and since the 1913-built railway bridge over the Volga in Yaroslavl was the only point at which to cross the river, the city became a major target for air raids during 1942–1943. During one of the heaviest of all these raids on June 11, 1943, over 120 of the city's inhabitants were killed, while another 150 or so were badly injured. In addition to this around 200 buildings (including one of the tire factory's main workshops) were completely destroyed. Most of the city's industry, including the automobile, tyre and textile plants, were converted, during the war, to produce armament and equipment for the Soviet Red Army. Overall about 200,000 people from the Yaroslavl area died on the fronts during World War II. This sacrifice is today memorialized through a monument and eternal flame which was opened near the mouth of the Kotorosl River in 1968.

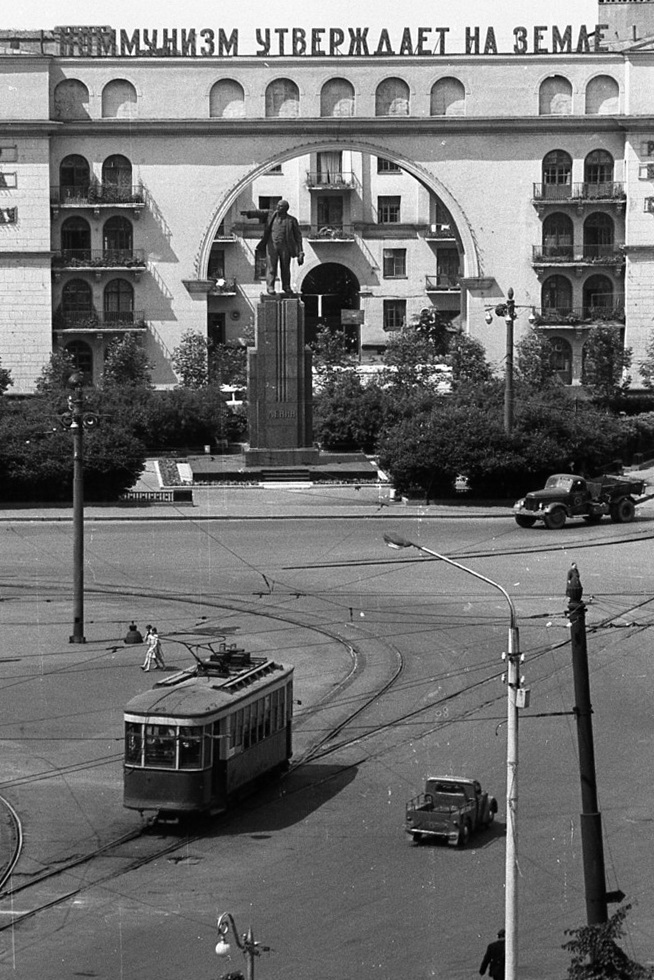
Red Square with its Lenin monument in Soviet-era Yaroslavl. Major building and infrastructure projects, as well as party slogans, such as that in this photo – 'Communism grows ever stronger upon the earth', were very characteristic of the urban development communism brought to the city

During the Blockade of Leningrad a great number of children, who were brought over the frozen Lake Ladoga (the so-called Road of life) were evacuated to a safer new life in Yaroslavl. Yaroslavl was at the time also home to a camp for military prisoners of war 'Camp No. 276' for German soldiers imprisoned for taking part in hostilities against the Soviet Union.

In the second half of the century, the industrialization and development of the city took the foremost position in Yaroslavl's history, including the opening of Yaroslavl Refinery in 1961. Beginning in the 1960s, the city began to open up and a large number of residential districts began to spring up all over the city, including, for the first time in the city's history, on the left bank of the Volga, where development had traditionally not taken place. This left-bank development was further encouraged by the construction, in 1965, of a new Volga crossing for automobiles. In 1968 the city's population finally rose, for the first time, to over half a million inhabitants; it has been growing, almost constantly, ever since.

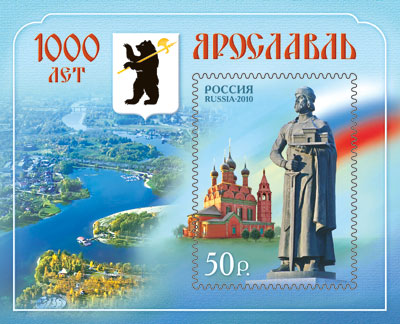
A Russian postage stamp celebrating the millennium of Yaroslavl

In July 2005 Yaroslavl's historic city center was inscribed onto the list of UNESCO World Heritage Sites. The support for this was in line with the list's second (a unique example of the combining of cultural and architectural styles between Western Europe and the Russian Empire) and fourth (a unique example of urban development influenced by the Municipal Planning Reform in Russia of Empress Catherine the Great 1763–1830). In the same year, the preparations for the celebration of the millennium of Yaroslavl's foundation began; this was finally celebrated on the second weekend in September 2010. Under the conditions of the preparations for the city's 1000th anniversary, the municipal authorities invested a great deal of money into the development of the city's road and rail infrastructure, much of the funds for which were granted by the federal government in Moscow. Included in these preparations was the opening of a new bridge (in 2006) over the Volga; this is now known as the Jubilee Bridge. Also in August 2008, the newly built Yaroslavl Zoo was opened; this was then expanded further in 2010.

In 2009, Yaroslavl became a meeting place for global policy debates within the International Conference 'The Modern State and Global Security'. AKA Yaroslavl Global Policy Forum. The conference in Yaroslavl gathered the most authoritative representatives of political science, business community as well as the representatives of the governments of a number of different states. Dmitry Medvedev, President of the Russian Federation, José Luis Zapatero, Prime Minister of Spain and François Fillon, Prime Minister of France were all participants at the Conference.

In 2010, Russian officials gathered together with international authorities in Yaroslavl to discuss the challenges facing the modern state at the Global Policy Forum for 'The Modern State: Standards of Democracy and Criteria of Efficiency'. In 2011 Yaroslavl will bring together participants from all over the world to discuss the 2011 agenda: 'The modern state in the age of social diversity'.

On September 7, 2011, most of the members of the city's KHL (ice hockey) team, Lokomotiv Yaroslavl, perished in the 2011 Lokomotiv Yaroslavl plane crash on takeoff from Yaroslavl's Tunoshna Airport.

== Geography ==
=== Location ===
The city lies in the eastern portion of Yaroslavl Oblast. The nearest large towns are Tutayev (34 kilometers or 21 miles to the northwest), Gavrilov-Yam (37 kilometers or 23 miles to the south), and Nerekhta (47 kilometers or 29 miles to the southeast). The historic center of Yaroslavl lies to the north of the mouth of the Kotorosl River on the right bank of the larger Volga River. The city's entire urban area covers around 205 square kilometers (79 sq mi) and includes a number of territories south of the Kotorosl and on the left bank of the Volga.

With nearly 600,000 residents, Yaroslavl is, by population, the largest town on the Volga until it reaches Nizhny Novgorod. It is a large transport node, and a great number of important national and regional roads, railways, and waterways pass through the city. Many of the roads that connect Yaroslavl to Moscow and beyond are two-lane highways.

Yaroslavl and its respective oblast are located in the central area of the East European Plain, which in areas to the northeast of Moscow is characterized by rolling hills and a generally uneven landscape; however, most of these hills are no larger than 200 meters (660 ft) in height. Typical for this region, the area in and around Yaroslavl is rich in mixed and coniferous forests. In addition to these, there are also large areas of swampland.

=== Climate ===
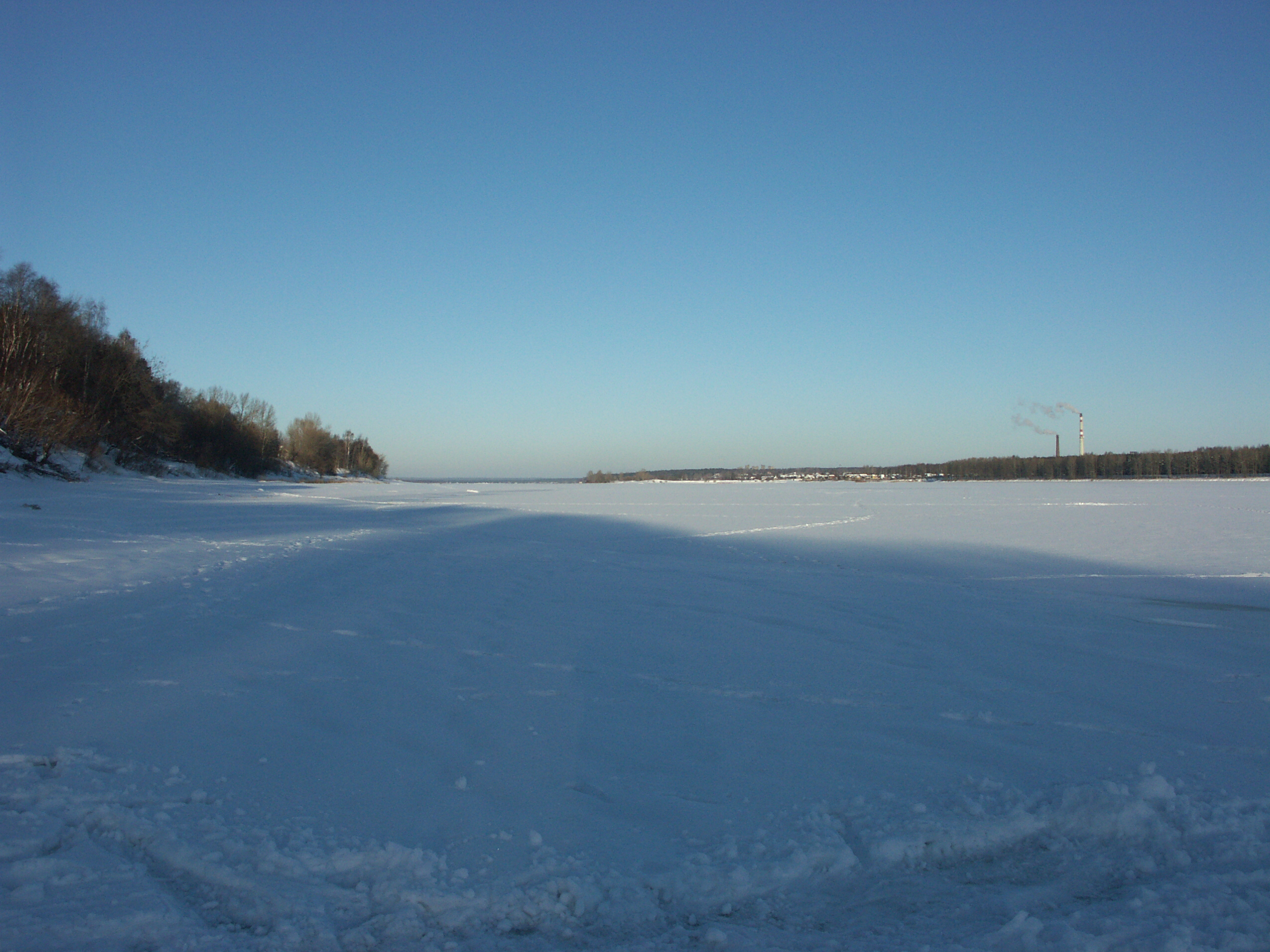
A completely frozen Volga River in Yaroslavl (winter 2006)

Yaroslavl and its local area have a typical temperate continental climate, in comparison to central and western Europe. This makes for a climate of snowier, colder, and drier winters, and typically temperate, warmer summers.

The winter weather in Yaroslavl begins in about November and usually goes on for five months, into spring. The coldest month of the year is typically January, with an average temperature of −12.0 °C (10.4 °F). However, at this time it is not uncommon for temperatures to drop below −20 °C (−4 °F). In some cases (for example, most recently in January 2006), temperatures of −35 to −40 °C (−31 to −40 °F) can be experienced. Record low is −46 °C (−51 °F). On the other hand, Yaroslavl can also experience positive temperatures during this time of the year (for example, in 1932, when a thaw lasted for seventeen days of January). Typically the Volga freezes over during the winter. Snow cover is usually 35–50 centimeters (14–20 in) thick, but can in some cases be up to 70 centimeters (28 in) in depth. The springtime months are best characterized by a typical lack of precipitation. Precipitation in April is low - 30–40 mm; its increase begins in May, when more than 50 mm of precipitation falls. May has the lowest relative humidity of the year - about 70%. From the end of March into April, there is often a thaw, and much of the ice and snow melts to reveal foliage underneath. It is not uncommon for temperatures in April to reach +20 °C (68 °F). Summers in Yaroslavl are typically wet with some heavy rainstorms. The summer often reaches its hottest point during the months of June/July, and often days over +30 °C (86 °F). From September begins the two-month-long fall, which is characterized by relatively high humidity, fewer sunny days, and unpredictable temperatures (it is possible to first see ground frost in September). The average amount of precipitation during a year is 591 millimeters (23.3 in), of which 84 millimeters or 3.3 inches (the most precipitation in one month) falls in July. The very least precipitation occurs in winter and spring (particularly in February and March).

The following figures for precipitation and temperature values in Yaroslavl have been collated on the basis of data from the years 1961–1990.

Climate data for Yaroslavl, Russia (1961–1990)
Month	Jan	Feb	Mar	Apr	May	Jun	Jul	Aug	Sep	Oct	Nov	Dec	Year
Mean daily maximum °C (°F)	−8.2 (17.2)	−5.8 (21.6)	0.1 (32.2)	9.0 (48.2)	17.8 (64.0)	21.4 (70.5)	23.3 (73.9)	21.5 (70.7)	14.9 (58.8)	7.2 (45.0)	−0.2 (31.6)	−5.2 (22.6)	8.0 (46.4)
Daily mean °C (°F)	−12.0 (10.4)	−10.0 (14.0)	−4.3 (24.3)	4.5 (40.1)	12.0 (53.6)	15.7 (60.3)	17.9 (64.2)	16.1 (61.0)	10.4 (50.7)	4.1 (39.4)	−2.7 (27.1)	−8.4 (16.9)	3.6 (38.5)
Mean daily minimum °C (°F)	−15.8 (3.6)	−14.2 (6.4)	−8.6 (16.5)	0.0 (32.0)	6.2 (43.2)	10.1 (50.2)	12.5 (54.5)	10.7 (51.3)	5.9 (42.6)	0.9 (33.6)	−5.2 (22.6)	−11.6 (11.1)	−0.8 (30.6)
Average precipitation mm (inches)	37 (1.5)	27 (1.1)	26 (1.0)	40 (1.6)	52 (2.0)	65 (2.6)	84 (3.3)	64 (2.5)	55 (2.2)	52 (2.0)	46 (1.8)	43 (1.7)	591 (23.3)

== Symbols ==
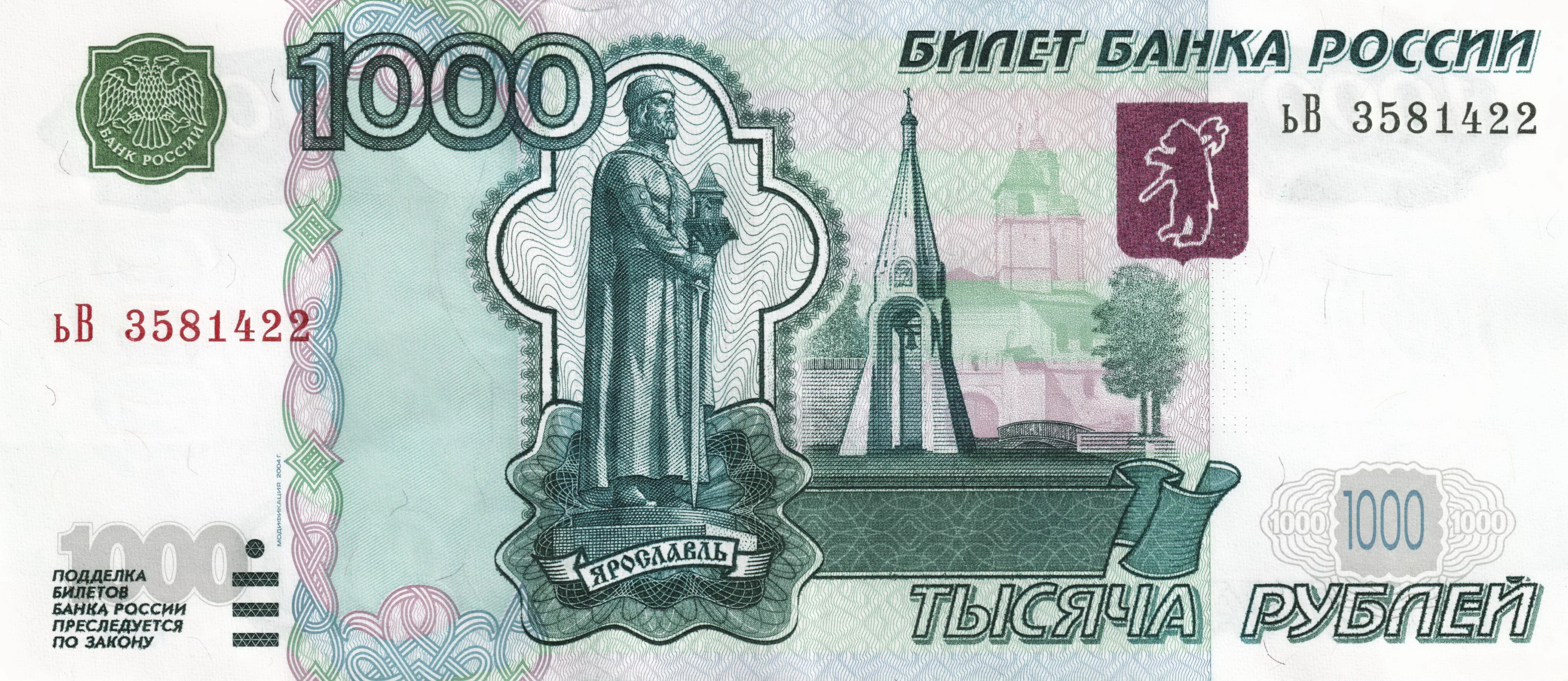
Yaroslavl's founder's monument and coat of arms are depicted on the front of the 1000 rouble note.

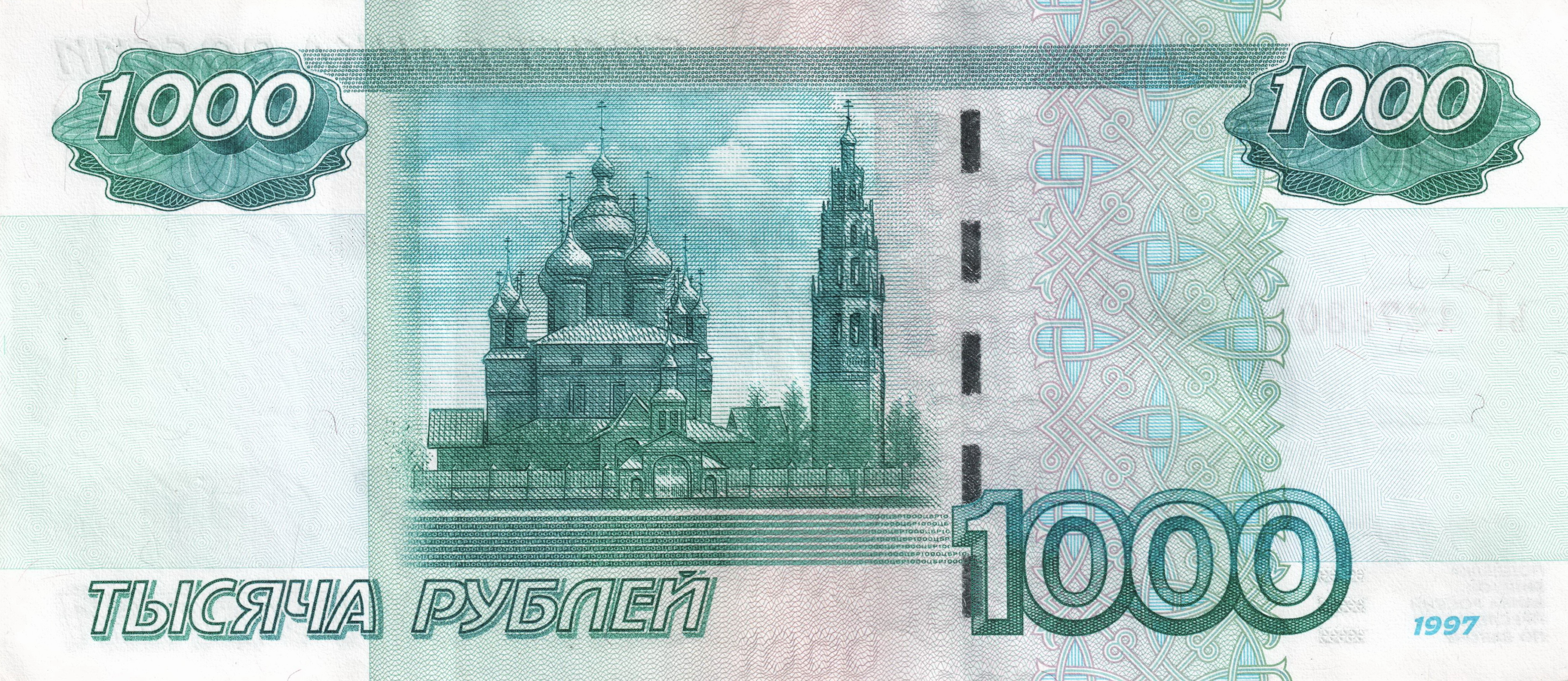
Whilst the city's St. John the Baptist Church is on the reverse.

Yaroslavl currently has a coat of arms and a flag which are both made up of two heraldic symbols. Both of these items are intrinsically linked with the legend surrounding the foundation of the city; the bear and halberd.

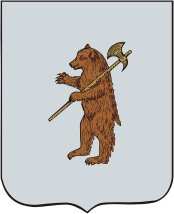
First municipal coat of arms from 1778

The first coat of arms of Yaroslavl was officially granted on August 31, 1778. At that time it was made up of a silver field upon which the form of a bear was placed, and which, with its left forepaw held a golden halberd. In 1856 the coat of arms was modified slightly, which left the traditional image of the halberd-carrying bear as it was but added an imperial crown surmounted on top of the shield. In addition to this a sprig of golden oak leaves was added to surround the shield, intertwined with the blue ribbon of the Order of Saint Andrew. This form of the coat of arms was then left unaltered until 1918, just after the Bolsheviks came to power as a result of the October Revolution. After the abolition of the Tsarist municipal and provincial symbols by the newly installed Soviet administration in Yaroslavl, the city received no new official symbols, and thus the situation remained until the end of the twentieth century. The third and current version of the city's coat of arms was adopted on August 23, 1995 by the municipal council. The coloring and form of the arms are taken from those of 1856; however, the sprig of oak and ribbon of St. Andrew were removed and have not yet been reintroduced to the symbols of the city. In addition to this, the imperial crown which previously surmounted the whole design has been replaced, in the current version by the Cap of Monomakh—a symbol of the Russian autocracy and an otherwise powerful symbol of the Russian state.

The flag of Yaroslavl was adopted on May 22, 1996. It is a simple design that depicts the coat of arms of the city (1995 version), which must take up at least one-third of the flag's entire size, upon a light blue background. The whole flag is rectangular in shape.

== Population ==
Historical population
Year	Pop.	±%
1897	72,000	—
1926	112,238	+55.9%
1939	299,359	+166.7%
1959	407,071	+36.0%
1970	517,314	+27.1%
1979	596,951	+15.4%
1989	632,991	+6.0%
2002	613,088	−3.1%
2010	591,486	−3.5%
2021	577,279	−2.4%
Source: Censuses

According to the 2021 All-Russian Population Census, as of October 1, 2021, the city was in 27th place in terms of population out of 1117 cities of the Russian Federation.

The share of Yaroslavl in the population of the region is 47.88%. Population density: 2805.05 people. per km^{2}.

=== Demographics ===
Population in thousands
Age	2008	2009
Younger than working age	81.3	82.2
Of these, children ages 1–6	32.4	33.3
Of working age	380.9	379.9
Older than working age	143.0	144.2

== Politics ==
The local government of Yaroslavl consists of the Mayoralty, the head of which is the mayor, and the Municipal Council, the members of which may cast votes at council meetings.

The mayoralty plays the role of the executive in the city's municipal administration. The mayor is elected by the city's electorate for four years in a direct election.

Between December 1991 and April 2012 this office has been held by Viktor Volonchunas, a member of the United Russia party.

In April 2012, Yevgeny Urlashov was elected the new mayor. However, on July 3, 2013, he was detained by police on charges of bribery extortion. On July 18, 2013, he was officially removed from his post and replaced with acting mayor Alexander Nechayev.

On November 7, 2022 Artyom Vladimirovich Molchanov was elected as the new mayor of the city.

The Municipal Council of the city makes up the administration's legislative branch, thus effectively making it a city 'parliament' or city duma. The municipal council is made up of 36 elected members, who represent a certain district of the city for a four-year term. In the regular meetings of the municipal council, problems facing the city are discussed, and annually the city's budget is drawn up. The council also has a court of audit and four standing committees.

Each of the city's six districts has its own district administration, all of which are ultimately part of the city's administration.

== Economics ==
Industry

- Yaroslavl Shipyard, Komatsu (along Kaluga Krasnodar Sankt Petersburg, Moscow area 2 - 3 sites, Kemerovo Oblast)
- Yaroslavl oil refinery
- YaMZ
- Takeda Pharmaceutical Company
- R-Pharma
- other various industry manufacturing

== Administrative and municipal status ==
Yaroslavl serves as the administrative center of the oblast and, within the framework of administrative divisions, it also serves as the administrative center of Yaroslavsky District, even though it is not a part of it. As an administrative division, it is incorporated as the city of oblast significance of Yaroslavl—an administrative unit with the status equal to that of the districts. As a municipal division, the city of oblast significance of Yaroslavl is incorporated as Yaroslavl Urban Okrug.

=== City divisions ===
Yaroslavl is divided into six city districts. The center is located on the northern bank of the Kotorosl River, where it converges with the Volga on the Volga's western bank. The center is the economic and political hub of the city. It is also the oldest district in the city and where it was first settled. The center contains the majority of landmarks and attractions in the city, including the Volkov Theater, the Church of Elijah the Prophet, the football stadium, and the Volga embankment and the monastery, which is often mistakenly called the kremlin. Pyatyorka is located north of the center but is still under its administrative jurisdiction. Pyatyorka is largely a residential region with very few notable sites, aside from a few houses of culture.

Across the Kotorosl lie Frunzensky and Krasnoperekopsky City Districts, which are divided by Moskovsky Avenue. Frunzensky is a relatively new district, constructed in the post-war era. Most of the buildings are of typical grey Soviet construction. Frunzensky City District is divided into three microdistricts: Suzdalka, Dyadkovo, and Lipovaya Gora.

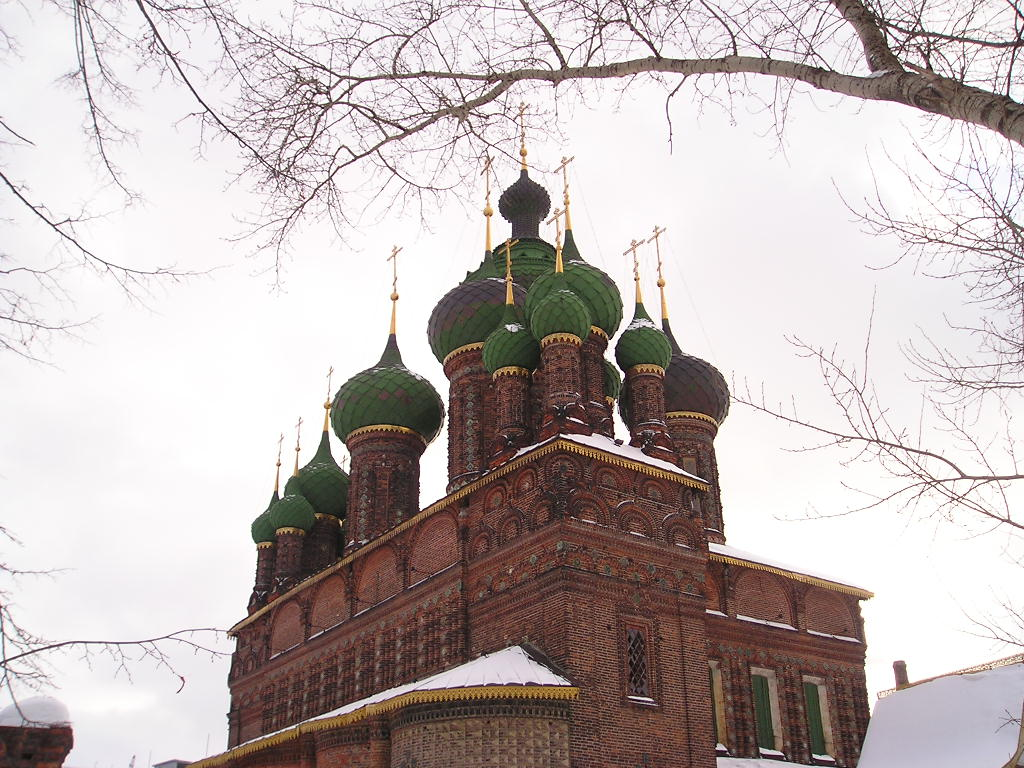
St. John the Baptist Church, dating from the 1680s, is the acme of traditional Russian architecture

Krasnoperekopsky City District is one of the oldest parts in Yaroslavl. Before the 1917 Revolution, it was home to the bulk of Yaroslavl's industry, and a good deal of industry remains today. Krasnoperekopsky City District is divided into two micro-districts, one of which is Neftestroy, an up-and-coming region, named for its proximity to the Yaroslavl Refinery. Neftestroy is home to the newly built hockey arena, and there were plans to build an indoor football stadium there by the millennial anniversary of Yaroslavl's founding in 2010. On the other side of the railway tracks that run through Krasnopereposky City District lies the Perekop proper. Today, Perekop is known as one of the most dangerous areas of Yaroslavl. It consists largely of run-down, pre-Soviet izbas and decaying factory buildings. There are plans to pump life into this depressed district, but at the time of writing, it remains extremely impoverished and dangerous. Much of Yaroslavl's mafia grew out of Perekop. Perekop has some of Yaroslavl's most notable churches, including the Church of Saint John the Baptist, which is located next to a paint factory on the Kotorosl embankment; and Peter and Paul's Cathedral, a Protestant-style Orthodox church.

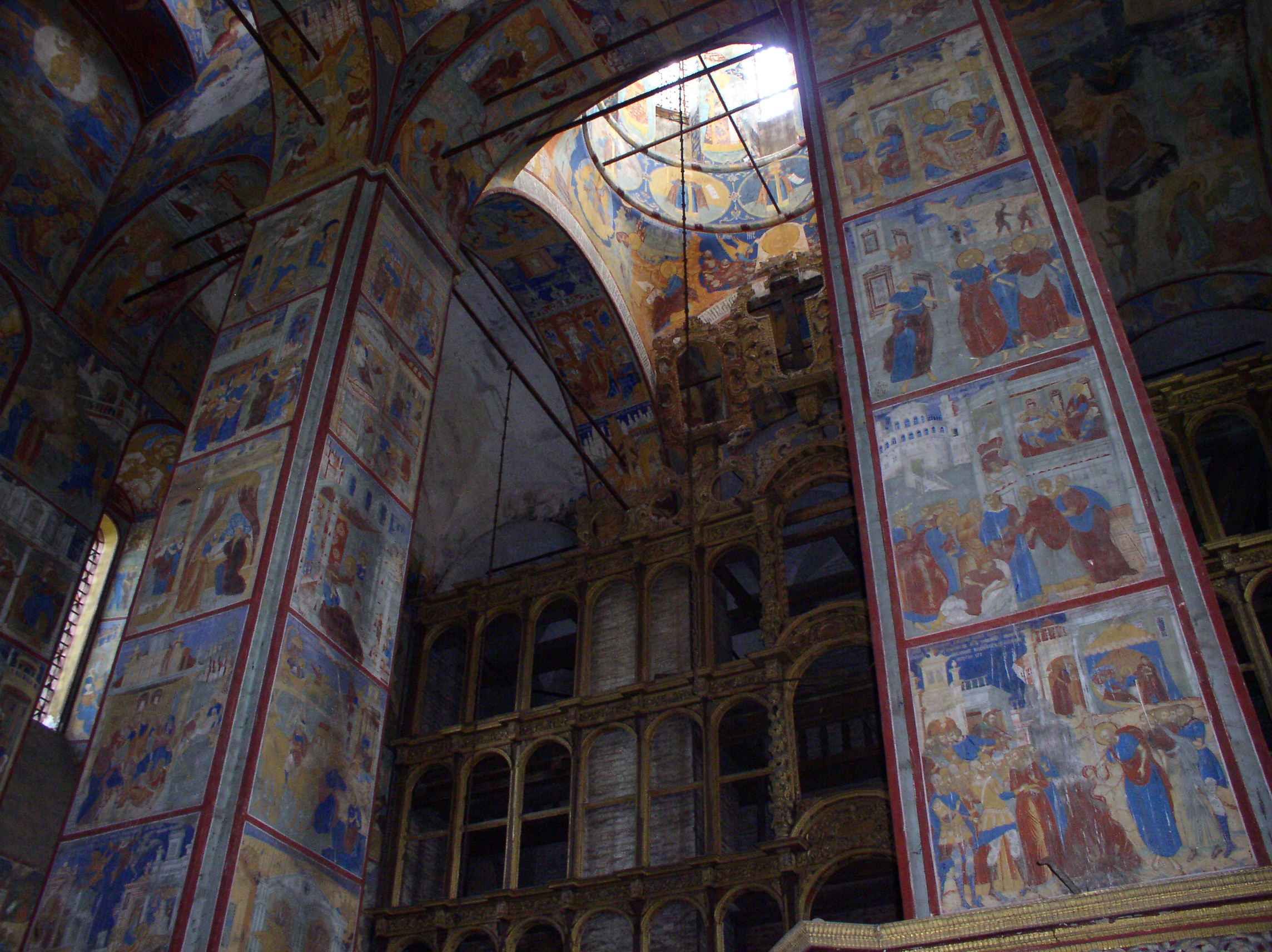
The 17th-century churches of Yaroslavl are renowned for their magisterial proportions and elaborate frescoes

North of the center there is a small industrial region, which is home to the tire factory, the engine plant, as well as many other smaller factories. Further north on the Western bank lies Dzerzhinsky City District, named after "Iron" Felix Dzerzhinsky, founder of the Cheka, the Soviet secret police. Dzerzhinsky City District's core micro-district is Bragino, named after a small village that was eventually consumed by Yaroslavl's post-war expansion. Bragino is the largest area in Yaroslavl in terms of population, but like Frunzensky City District, it is largely a residential area, mostly consisting of middle- to lower-middle-income families.

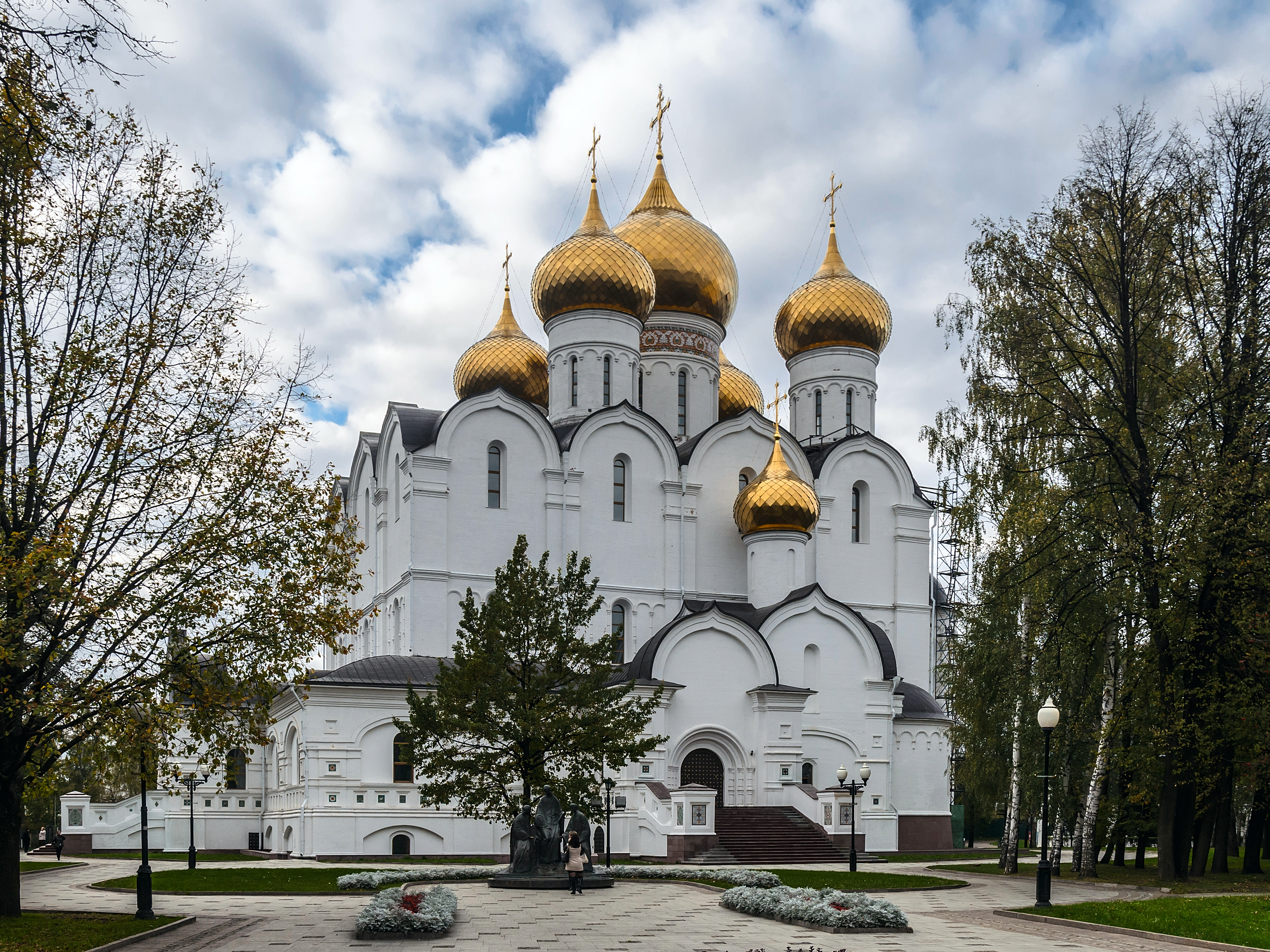
The Assumption Cathedral, built in stone in the early 1210s, was rebuilt in its current form in 2010

On the other bank of the Volga lies Zavolzhsky City District. This city district was a rural area, but now it is one of the most dynamic parts of the city with expansive new buildings with big hypermarkets, such as "Globus" and "Real". Birch and evergreen forests separate the apartment blocks.

== Travel and culture ==
Yaroslavl is one of the eight cities of Russia's Golden Ring, a group of touristic, historic towns around Moscow. Yaroslavl is situated on the north-eastern side of this 'ring' and is the largest city in its chain. While the city is best known for its architectural merits, it also has a relatively large repertoire of cultural attractions.

=== Architecture ===
Historical Centre of the City of Yaroslavl
UNESCO World Heritage Site
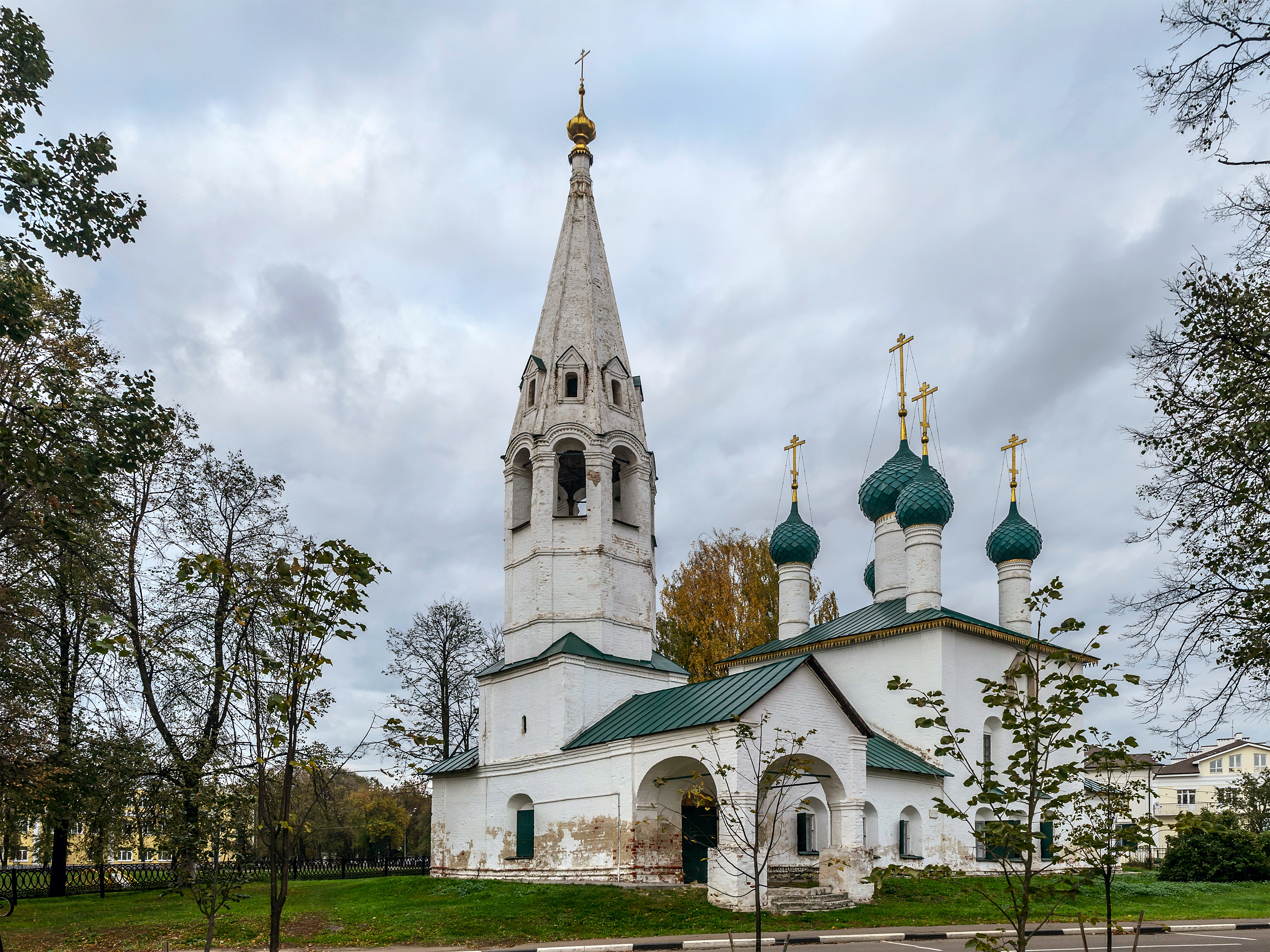
- Church of Saint Nicholas in Yaroslavl
- Interactive map of Historical Centre of the City of Yaroslavl
- Criteria: Cultural: (ii)(iv)
- Reference: 1170
- Inscription: 2005 (29th Session)

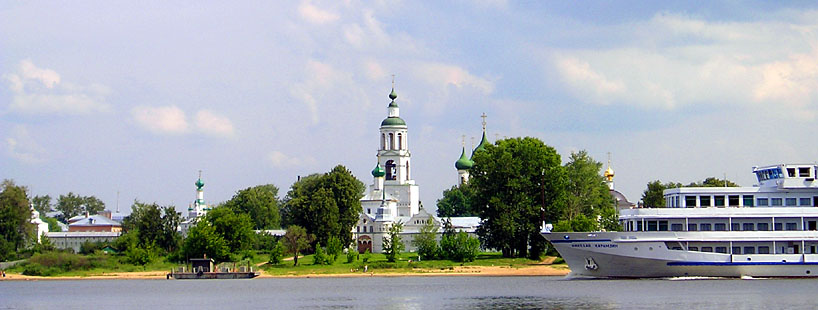
Many Orthodox shrines and monasteries lie along the banks of the Volga.

Despite the effects of the Russian Civil War and a number of air-raids during World War II, the city of Yaroslavl has managed to retain a great deal of its 17th, 18th and 19th-century urban substance. This has helped make the city recognized as a monument to the architectural development and style of the Russian Tsardom. The center of the city, which covers an area of around 600 hectares has around 140 individual federally-protected architectural monuments. Since 2005, this ensemble, along with the Spaso-Preobrazhensky Monastery has been included on the list of UNESCO World Heritage Sites. Despite all this, there are a number of buildings of architectural merit which are located outside of the city center.

==== Old town ====
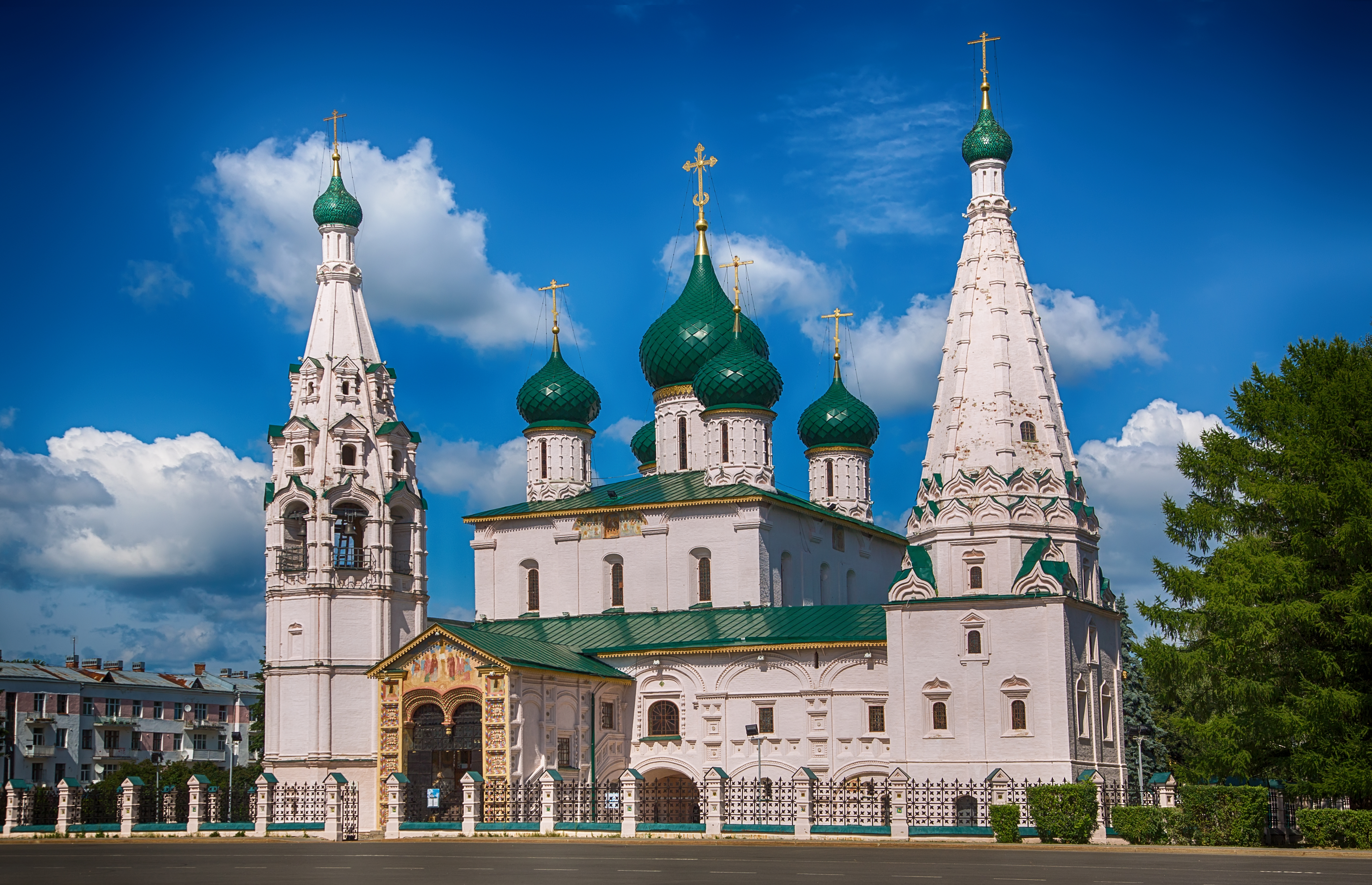
Church of Elijah the Prophet in Yaroslavl

The old town is effectively triangular in shape; this triangle is formed by the natural border provided to the south and east by the Kotorosl and Volga rivers, and on the land side by the geometric pattern of the street plan, which dates from the 18th and 19th centuries.

Constructed in 1506–1516 on the foundations of the original edifice dating back to 1216–1224. In the 16th century, the first stone wall is built around the monastery. It is from this monastery that an army of volunteers led by Minin and Prince Pozharsky set out to liberate Moscow from Polish invaders. In 1787, the monastery was closed and converted into a residence of the Yaroslavl and Rostov bishops. At that time, monastery buildings began to be reconstructed. New cells and the prior's chambers were built.

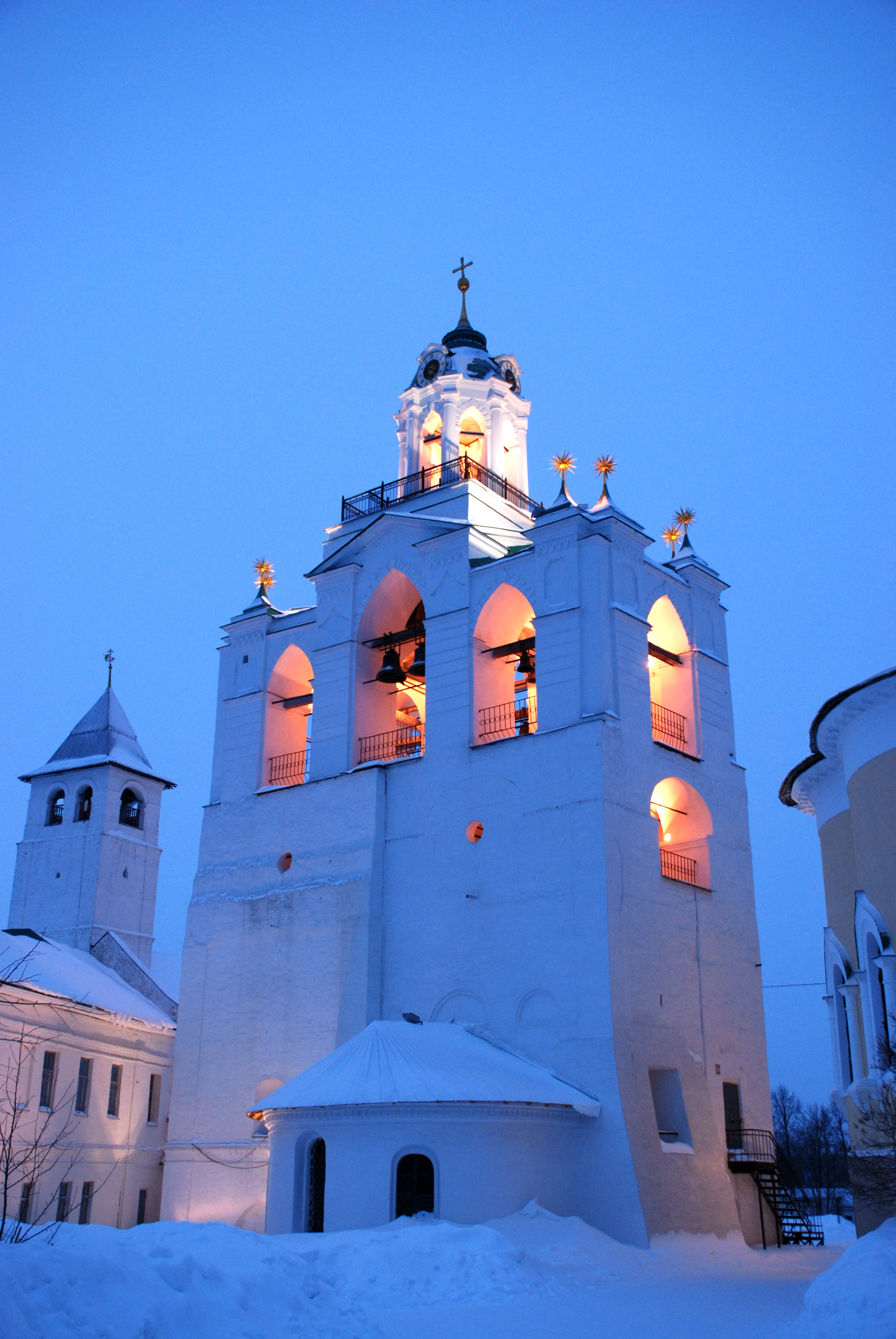
The belfry tower of the Spaso-Preobrazhensky Monastery

The most well-known building in the city is the 'Spaso-Preobrazhensky' ('Transfiguration of the Savior') Cathedral of the Spassky (St Savior) Monastery (russ. Спасо-Преображенский монастырь). This monastery was founded in the 12th century and thus it, and its cathedral, is the oldest buildings in the city. The Transfiguration Cathedral itself, built in 1516, is the oldest detached building standing in the city, (Спасо-Преображенский собор). Typical for a Russian monastery of the Middle Ages, the Spaso-Preobrazhensky Monastery in Yaroslavl was built to be not a place of worship, but also to be a citadel and kremlin in case, in times of war, there was a need for such a facility. This is still visible today as the monastery is surrounded by a thick 16th century, white-painted wall, complete with watchtowers and embattlements. Within these walls stand the magisterial churches, which, with their asymmetrically ordered towers and decorated interiors, make for examples of traditional Russian sacral architecture. In addition to this, there is a gatehouse church, with which the monastery's dungeons and treasury were connected. The monastery has long had a place in the history of Yaroslavl and continues, albeit nowadays as a museum, to play a role in the life of the city. It was largely thanks to the impregnability of the monastery that, during the time of the Troubles, the Russian peasants' army was able to defend the city and then go on to liberate Moscow from its Polish-Lithuanian occupiers. At the end of the 18th century, the oldest known text of the Tale of Igor's Campaign, the most renowned work of Russian-language literature from the Middle Ages, was found in the library of the SPaso-Preobrazhensky Monastery. This work is now on display as a permanent exhibition within the monastery, along with other works of the age and an exhibition showing the conditions an author of the era would have lived in.

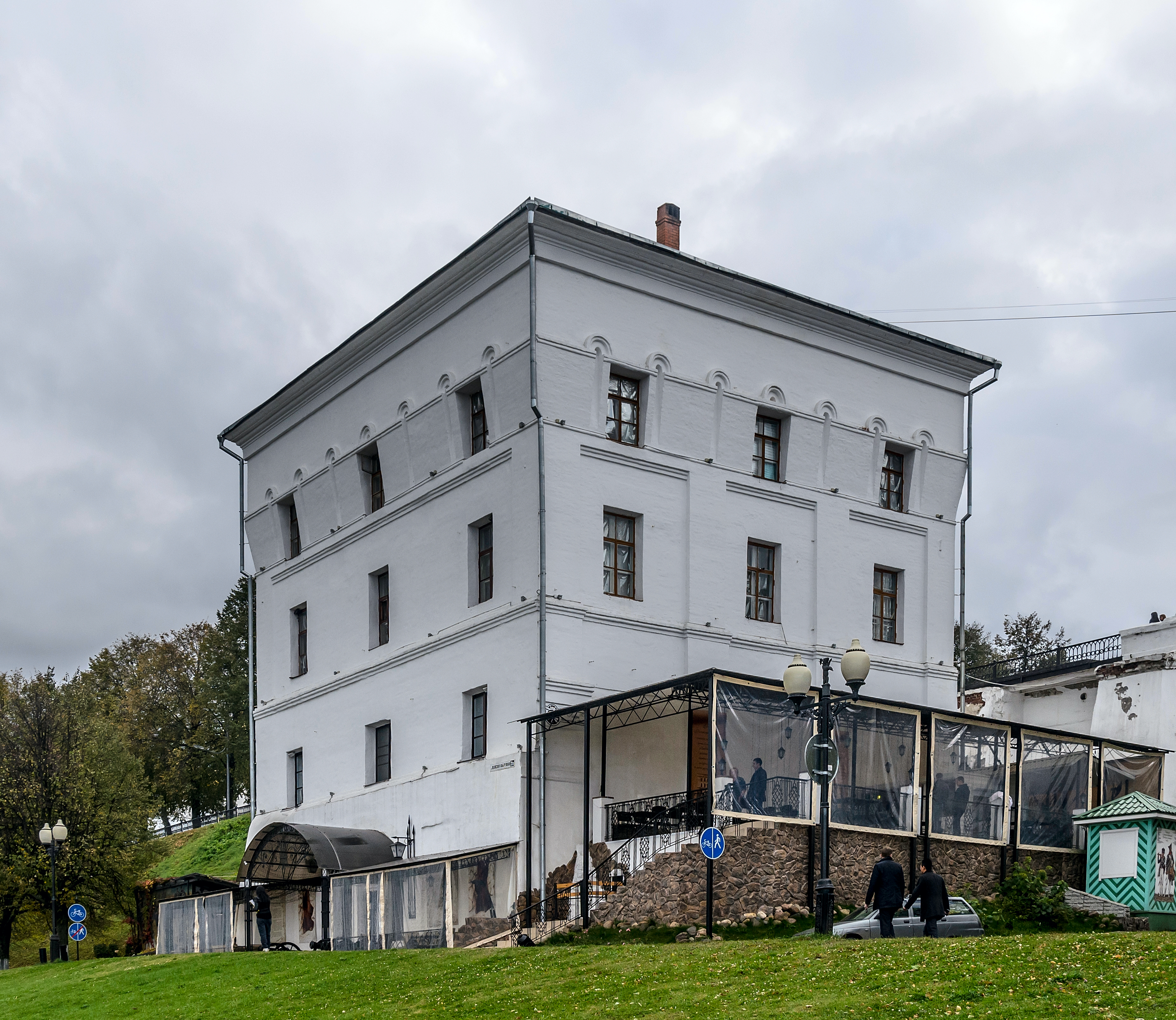
Volzhskaya tower

The often hectic square which is to be found just beyond the north gate of the monastery (main gate), is called Bogolavyenskaya Square (Epiphany Square) (Богоявленская площадь). This name comes from the nearby Epiphany Church (Богоявленская церковь) which is seated at the south end of the square, near the bank of the Kotorosl. This church, with its five domes, and traditional Russian sacral architecture, is a classic example of a medieval Russian church. However, the church has a separate clock tower which was built in accordance with the sacral-architectural style of Muscovy in the years 1684–1693; this all goes to make the church one of the most noticeable examples of 17th-century architecture in the city. In addition to this, the fresco-work inside the church was carried out by local artists during the building of the church and has remained, almost unchanged, to this day.

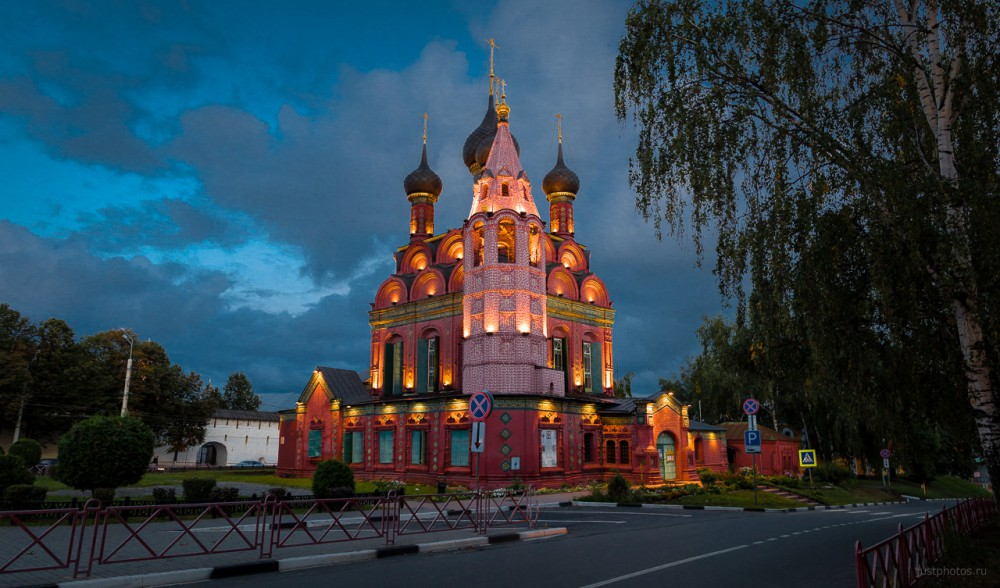
Epiphany Church

The two streets which lead off Bogolavyenskaya Square to the northwest are very good examples of the type of urban planning which was formulated for Yaroslavl in the 18th and 19th centuries. They were laid out in 1820–1821 as new boulevards to run around the historic city center and were built on terrain previously occupied by a number of earthen and wooden fortifications which dated from the 16th century. There was also a small defensive moat in this area, and after the infilling of the moat and removal of all other fortifications, the defensive uses of the Spaso-Preobrazhensky monastery largely disappeared. This was, in general, not considered to be a great loss, as the requirement for such earthworks in order to maintain defensive readiness had long since been surpassed by other methods of securing a city by the point of their removal. The two municipal watchtowers which have been retained (the Vassily tower and Volzhskaya tower) were both positioned on the city's outer defensive walls which afforded them clear views of oncoming enemy forces.

Within the old defensive limits of the city, one can find many other examples of classicism, one important example of which would be the municipal trade rows 'Gostiny Dvor' (Гостиный двор) – these were built in 1813–1818, not long after the clearing of the land upon which they now stand. The style of the building, made noticeable by its many Ionic columns, is similar to that of many Russian trade rows and market halls built in the early to mid-19th century, all over the country. This style is also very complementary to the 1911-built neoclassical Volkov Theater. At the end of Komsomolskaya Boulevard, upon which the trade rows are located, one finds themselves at 'Volkov Square' (площадь Волкова); where the ring-boulevard makes a slight deviation to the north-east and carries on towards 'Red Square' (Красная площадь) and the city's Volga embankment. Yaroslavl's Red Square does not have the same etymology as the likewise-named Red Square in Moscow (the name of which stems from the old-Russian for 'beautiful square'), rather in Yaroslavl's case, its Red Square was first so-called in the 1920s, and was officially named in honor of the Soviet Red Guards. There are a number of buildings of historical interest on Red Square, one of which is the three-story building on the square's north side which once housed Yaroslavl's 'aristocrat's meeting house' (Дворянское собрание), and is now the main building for the city's 'Demidov' State University. Furthermore, the square is also the location where the city's main fire department can be found; this is contained within a jugendstil building, built in 1911, and which has a large look-out tower, which even until the 1970s was actively used by the city's fire brigade.

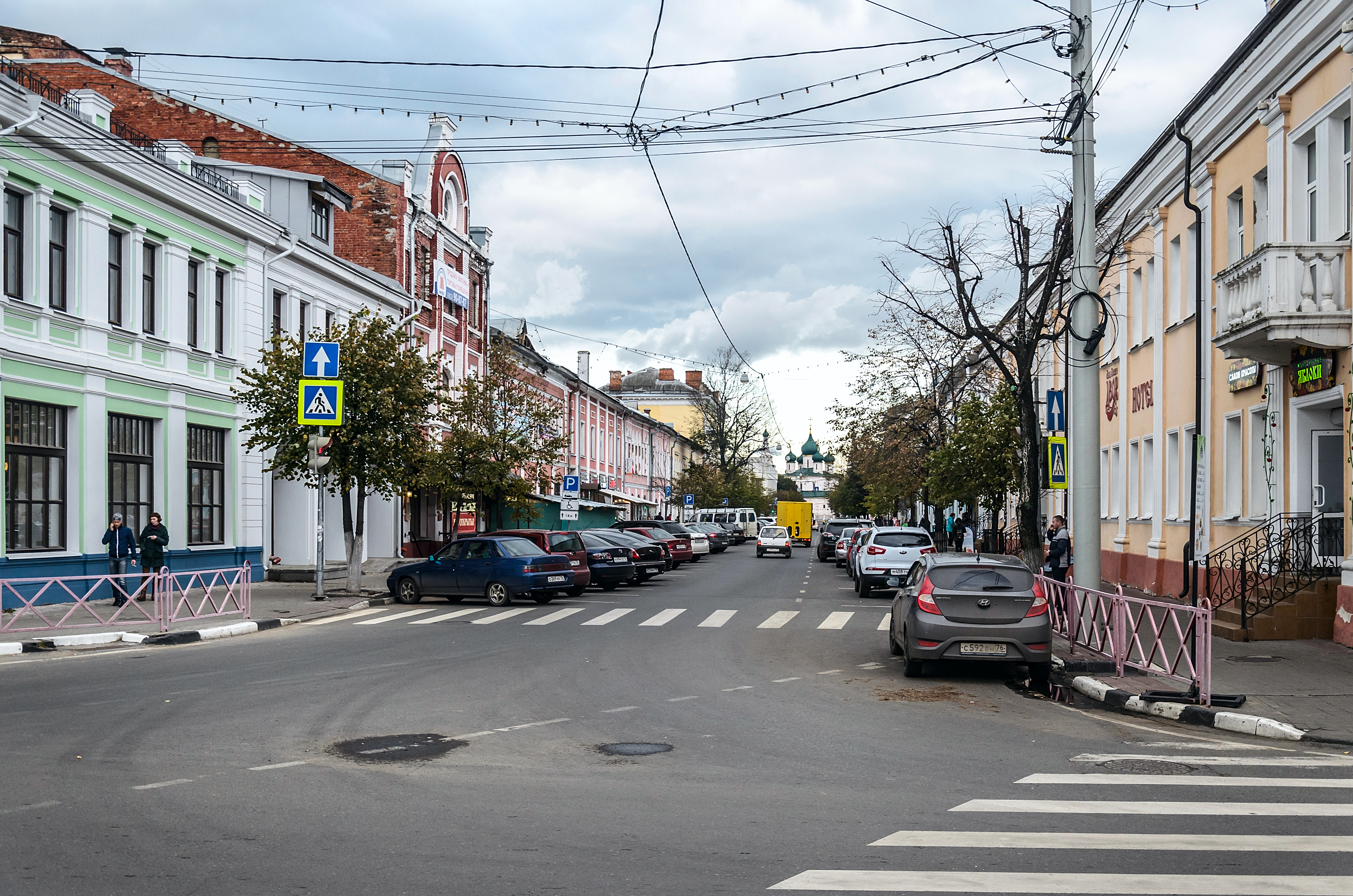
Nakhimsona Street

To the east of the boulevard, within the borders of the former defensive earthworks, the architecturally-rich 'nucleus' of the old city is to be found; an area crisscrossed by many narrow, small streets, in the middle of which one of Yaroslavl's most well-recognized architectural monuments is to be found. This is the Church of Elijah the Prophet (Церковь Илии Пророка), which, in the same way as the Epiphany Church, is a very prominent example of the way in which the city developed in the 17th century. Before the completion of the church which currently stands in 1650, a number of other predecessor churches stood on this spot. From these, the oldest dates back to the foundation of Yaroslavl and the reign of Yaroslav the Wise. The church, with its five onion domes, is a cross and dome-style church, the architecture of which is typical of Muscovite designs, is particularly well known for its interior fresco paintings, which, despite a history which has seen great fires and disasters, have been kept in good condition. The frescos on the walls and ceilings were painted by around fifteen experienced artists from Yaroslavl and Kostroma around the year 1680. The fresco-work is festooned with many references to the Old Testament. The square, upon which the church, with its clock tower and neighboring chapel, is situated, was in the early 19th century, according to the city's urban plan, to be the central square of Yaroslavl and the place upon which markets and national holidays would take place. Nowadays it is an area largely reserved for official events, with the other buildings surrounding the square all belonging to the municipal administration.

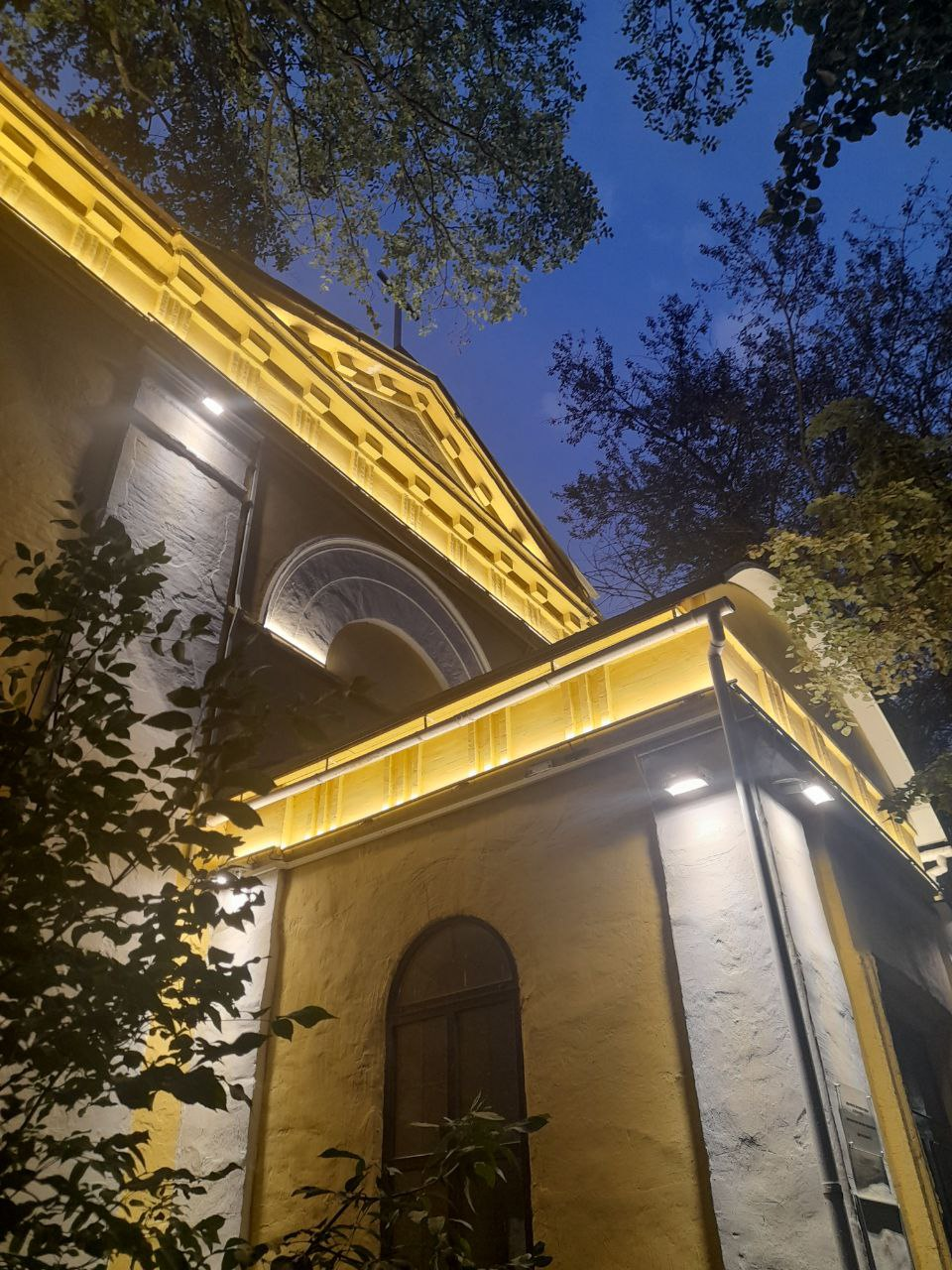
The Lutheran Church of Saint Peter and Saint Paul

In general, the streets of the city center are characterized by a noticeable mix of classical and sacral architecture. There are a number of major public and commercial buildings of architectural merit in the center of the city, among which are the 1785 'Governmental offices' building' (Здание присутственных мест) and the Vakromeyev House, which today houses the Yaroslavl Seminary for young priests. The Volga embankment is a good example of urban planning in the classicist style; built in the 1840s, this promenade walk has remained a favorite place for residents to take a stroll and relax ever since.

The southern part of the city center, around the area where the Kotorosl and Volga intersect, is an area abundant in green park-like spaces. Until the 17th century this area was occupied by the wooden Yaroslavl Kremlin and is thus referred to nowadays as 'Wooden Town' (Рубленый город). The Kremlin burnt down in 1658 and was never rebuilt. Close by the 1642 Church of Maria (Успенский собор) stood until its demolition in 1937, however, since 2004 the church was under reconstruction and was finally opened on September 12, 2010, by Patriarch of Moscow Kirill.

Yaroslavl is the site of the Volkov Theater (built 1750), the oldest theater in Russia, and the Demidovsky Pillar.

The city has many Russian Orthodox churches, one Russian Old Believers church, one Baptist church, one Lutheran church, one Armenian Apostolic church, one mosque and one synagogue.

=== Theater and cinema ===
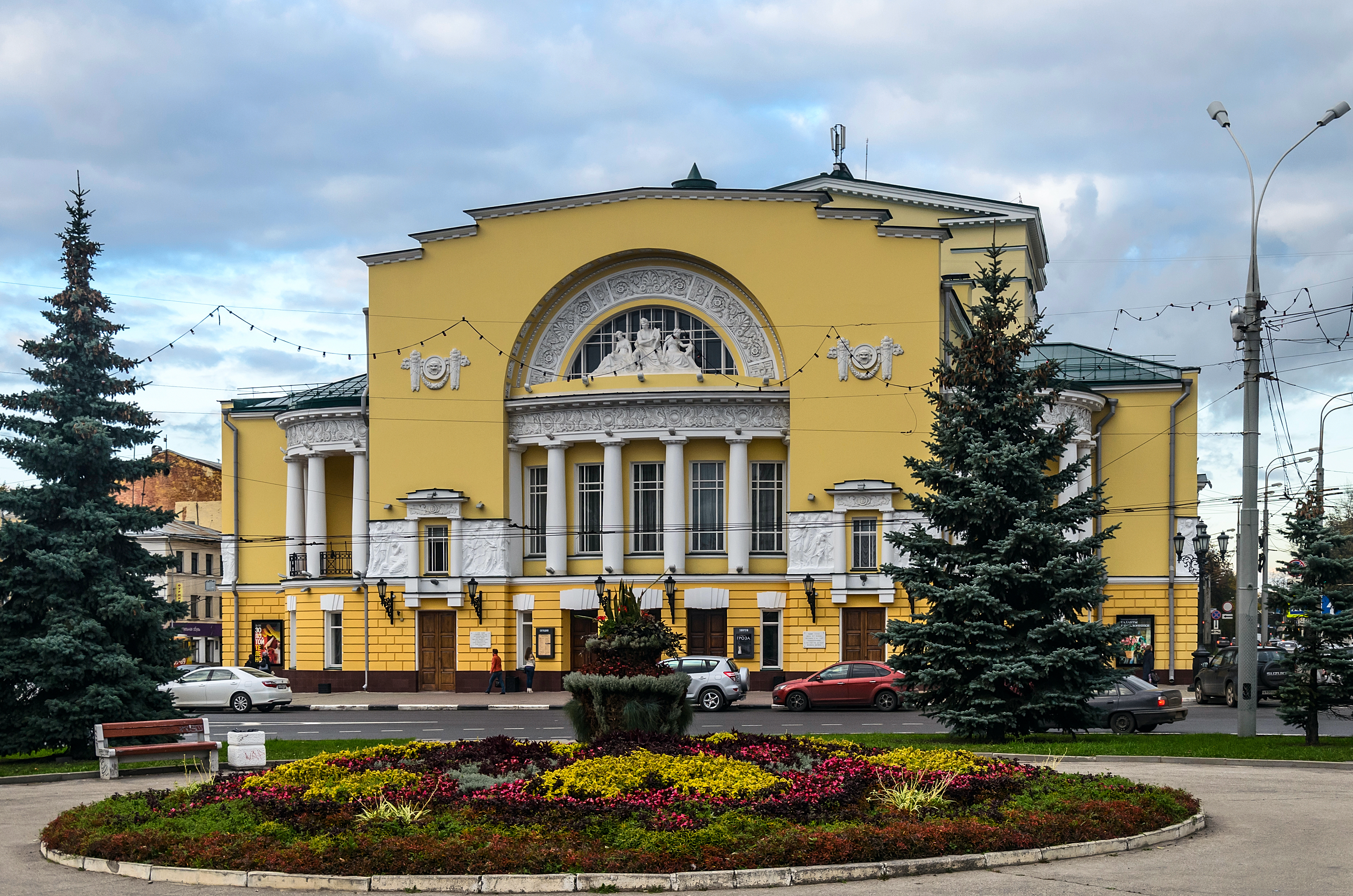
Yaroslavl's renowned Volkov Theater

Yaroslavl has three theaters, the most famous of which is the 'Volkov Theater', an institution which since 1911 has been housed in a large neoclassical building in the city's old town. Named after its founder, Fyodor Volkov, the theater was first opened to the public in 1750, this making it Russia's first (by official figures) theatre. The Volkov Theater still has a reputation for being one of Russia's most pioneering dramatic institutes and is considered, among the Russian acting community, to be one of the most prestigious playhouses in which to perform. Even though Volkov's original theater troop only performed in Yaroslavl for a few months before then moving to Saint Petersburg (there was no regular theater company in Yaroslavl again until the beginning of the 19th century), the town is still recognised as the spiritual home of the Russian theater and dramatics. Nowadays the Volkov Theater has two stages and a combined amount of around 1000 seats for spectators.

Apart from the Volkov Theater, there are a number of other theatres in Yaroslavl, including the State Puppet Theater (founded in 1927), a children's and youth theater (Yaroslavl State Theater for Young Spectators, founded 1984), and the Yaroslavl Chamber Theater (founded 1999). In addition to these theaters, the city also has a philharmonic (founded 1937) and a permanent circus (founded 1963).

There are around ten movie theaters in the city, the oldest of which 'Rodina' was built during the Soviet era in 1959. This particular theatre, despite maintaining its Soviet-era exterior, has been comprehensively modernised and is now even able to show 3D films. The city also has a number of large, modern multiplex cinemas, including those of the Russian cinema chains Cinema-Star and Kinomax.

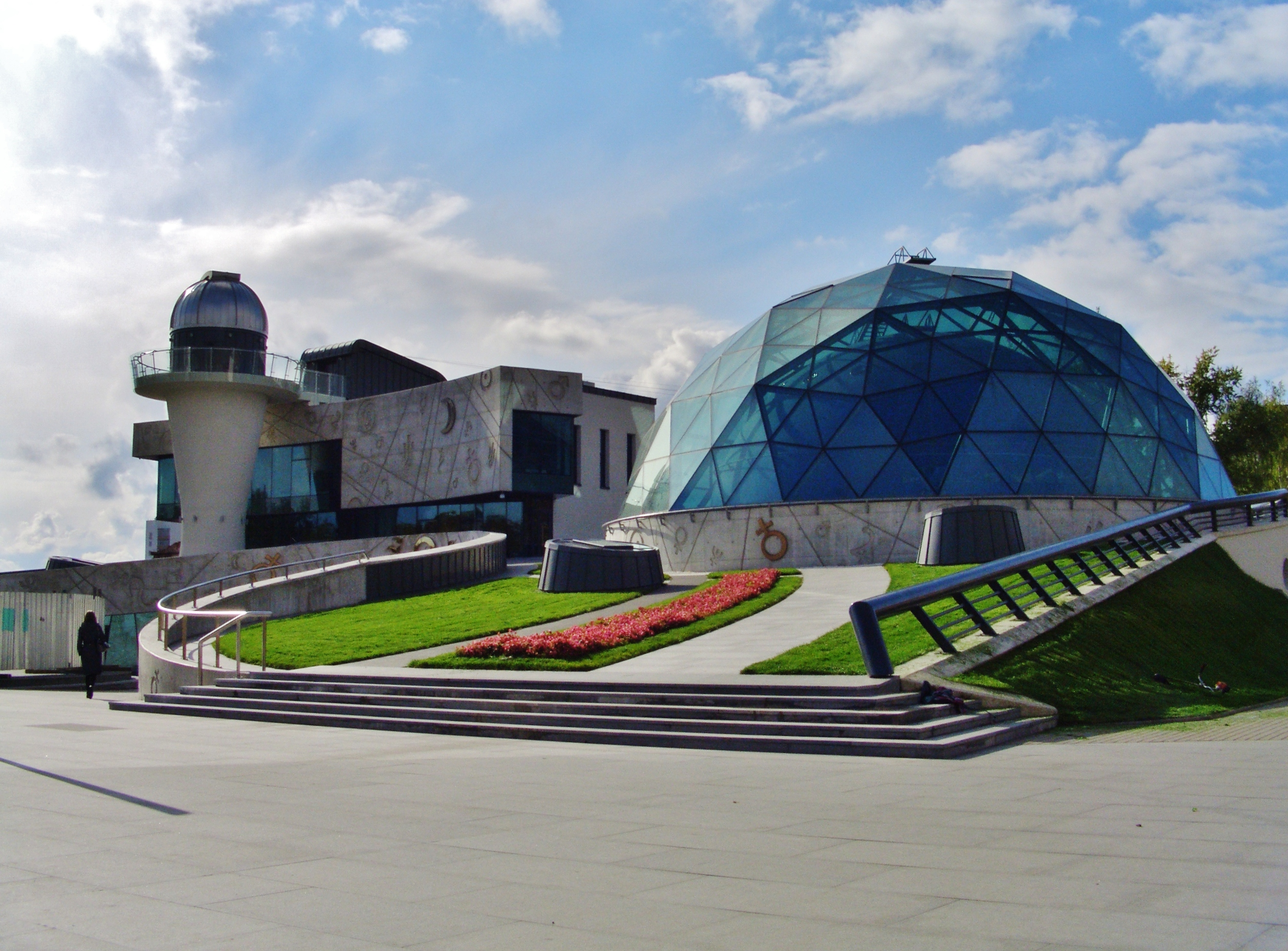
Yaroslavl Planetarium

Uncommon for a provincial Russian city, Yaroslavl has a large municipal Planetarium This was founded in 1948 and was situated, for a long time, in an old church. However, in April 2011, after two years of construction, the city's new 'Valentina Tereshkova' planetarium (named after the first female cosmonaut) was opened to the public.

=== Global Policy Forum ===
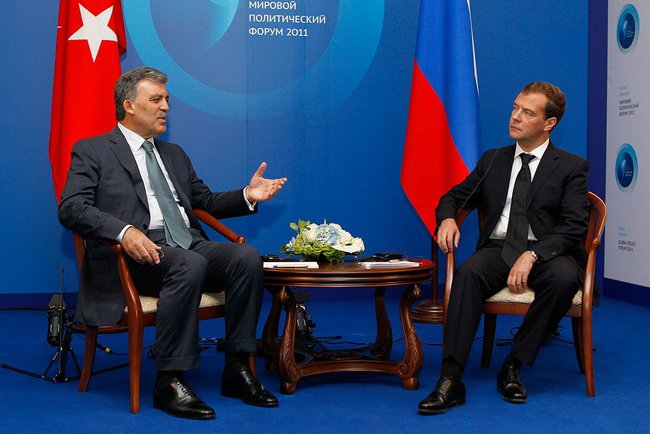
President Dmitry Medvedev converses with Turkish president Abdullah Gül at the 2011 Yaroslavl Global Policy Forum

In recent years Yaroslavl has become well known for the high-level political discourse it has hosted under the auspices of the Yaroslavl Global Policy Forum. This event, organised by the Russian government, and with the backing of President Dmitry Medvedev, has been running since 2009 and represents one of the highest level political-diplomatic forums in the world today. It is the largest political science event organised in Russia and is held on an annual basis, with a number of foreign officials appearing as participants each year. For example, in the past, French and Italian prime ministers François Fillon and Silvio Berlusconi have been guests, as well as Spanish prime minister Jose Zapatero.

In 2011 Turkish president Abdullah Gül was received as a guest participant by the Russian authorities.

Yaroslavl was chosen to host the event due to its thousand-year history of being a meeting point for people of all cultures, a significant trading post, and its former status as Russia's second-largest city, within which a great number of foreign embassies were situated. The award of this forum to the city coincided with the city's millennium celebrations and thus it is commonly viewed by residents to have been a gift from the Russian president to the city which has helped raise the city's global profile.

In 2011, this event became headline news in a number of countries due to the unfortunate events which led to the deaths of around forty people (players, support staff, and aircrew) from Yaroslavl's 'Lokomotiv' ice hockey team. President Medvedev was, at the time of the crash, attending the conference at Lokomotiv's home stadium 'Arena 2000', and specially postponed a number of important meetings to make sure he could travel to the crash site and meet with crash victims' relatives. Later Russian prime minister Vladimir Putin also arrived in the city to pay his condolences.

== Education ==
Yaroslavl has a large number of educational establishments which enclose all three levels of the Russian educational system: primary (ca. 20 establishments), middle (ca. 20 colleges and other secondary schools), and higher (8 state and 2 non-state funded higher educational institutions). In Yaroslavl, one can study for both masters' and bachelors' level courses.

Yaroslavl is currently home to the following state higher educational institutions: Yaroslavl 'Demidov' State University, Yaroslavl State Technical University, Ushinskiy Pedagogical University, Yaroslavl State Medical Academy, Yaroslavl State Agricultural Academy, Yaroslavl State Institute for Theatrical Studies, Military School of Finance and Economics, and the Yaroslavl Higher School for Anti-Aircraft and Missile Defence. Amongst the non-state funded institutions for further education in the city is the International Academy for Business and New Technologies (MUBiNT), and also a number of branches from Moscow-based universities. In addition to these establishments, there is also the Yaroslavl Seminary, a large establishment for the training of new Russian Orthodox priests.

By the end of 2008 Yaroslavl had around 187 pre-school teaching and care groups registered within the city, within these there were around 22,700 places that were oversubscribed and thus filled by around 26,000 pre-school aged children. The number of registered children was around 78.7%, or around 0.4% more than in 2007. At the beginning of the 2008–9 academic year, the city had around 100 daytime general educational groups for children within which around 48,100 infants were registered. This figure was around 200 people less than in the previous year. According to the situation in 2010 around 16,000 people are to be found working in Yaroslavl's educational sector.

== Transportation ==
Yaroslavl is situated at the crossing point of a number of major automotive, rail, and riverboat routes. The M8 (Moscow–Yaroslavl–Vologda–Arkhangelsk) links the city to Moscow and also onwards to the north in the direction of Arkhangelsk. One major railway bridge and two automotive bridges (Oktyabrsky and Yubileyny Bridge) traverse the Volga River. The Kotorosl River is crossed by as many as four bridges for automobiles and one for railway traffic (built in 1896).

=== Automotive transport ===
In the last few years, the authorities of Yaroslavl have been acting on the initiative to build a bypass around the city. For this reason, the center of the city is now largely free of freight transporters and other larger vehicles transiting through the city. In August 2010, the first piece of this new bypass was opened, it included an interchange, which connects the Yubileyny Bridge with the Southwest Yaroslavl relief road.

There is one railway bridge across the Volga and two road bridges; the second road bridge across the Volga was ready for use in October 2006.

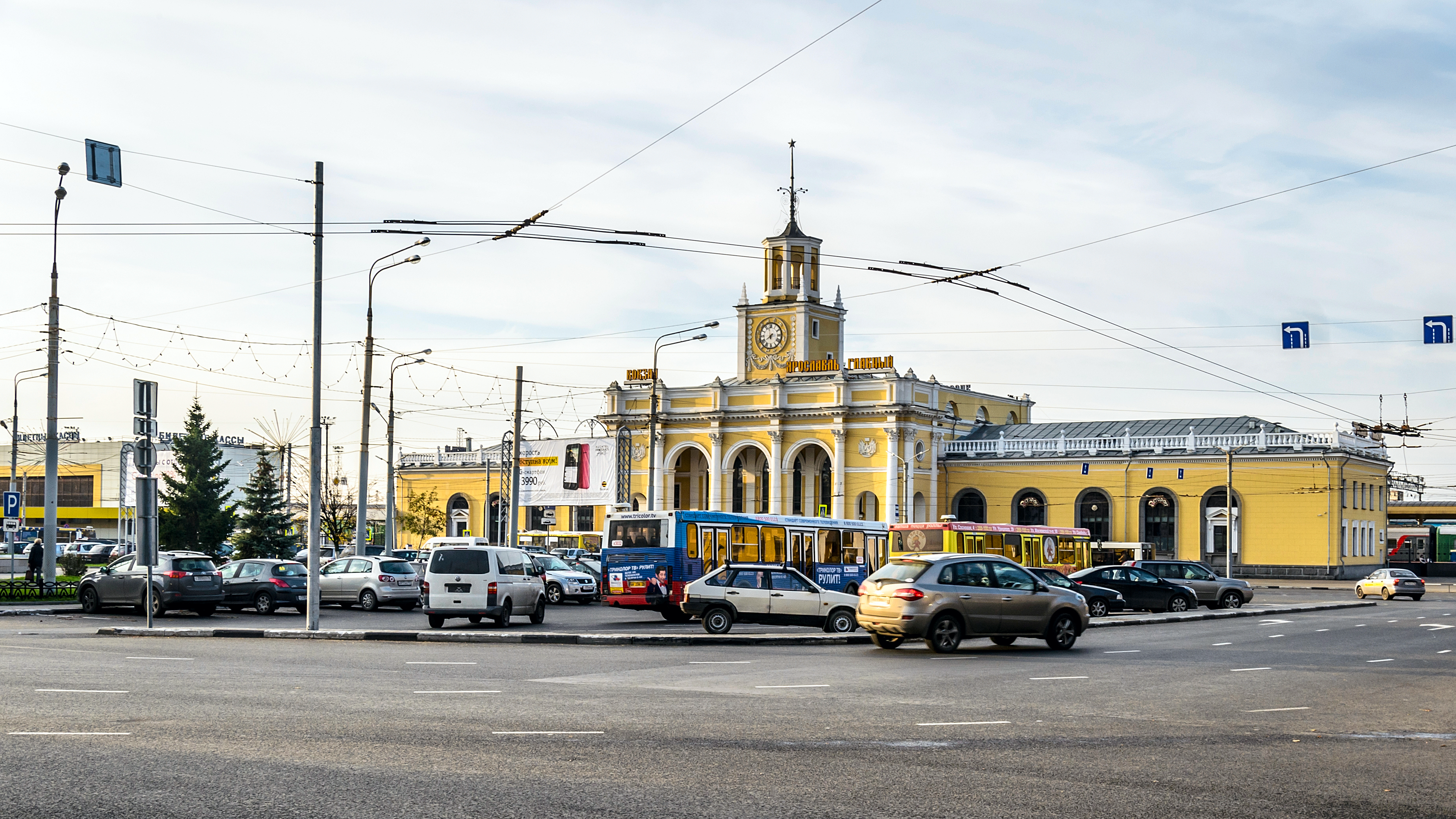
Yaroslavl Glavny, the city's main station, is a major stop for numerous passenger trains traveling between Moscow and the other regions of Russia each day.

Interurban and regional bus services depart from and arrive at the city's main bus terminal. The services run from this station serve a number of highly populated areas as well as other villages and smaller towns located within Yaroslavl Oblast such as Pereslavl-Zalessky, Rybinsk, and Uglich. Larger cities served include Moscow, St. Petersburg, Ufa, Kostroma, Kazan, and Cherepovets.

=== Railway ===
Yaroslavl is the major node of the Northern Railway (part of Russian Railways). Northern Railway headquarters are located on the city's Volga Embankment. There are two major passenger railway stations: Yaroslavl-Glavny and Yaroslavl-Moskovsky serving many long-distance passenger trains. The city is connected to Moscow by an electric train service (sitting places only) named 'Express' taking around 3 hours for the 280km journey. Nearby areas are served by a network of suburban trains with electrified service to Danilov, Rostov, Alexandrov, Nerekhta, and Kostroma and diesel service to Rybinsk and Ivanovo.

=== Air transport ===
Yaroslavl's main airport is Golden Ring International Airport. It was built as a World War 2 airbase. The airport caters to a variety of aircraft types. Voronezh based Polet Flight provides several daily flights to Moscow's Domodedovo International Airport.

There are also two smaller airports: Levtsovo Air Base and Karachikha air field. Levtsovo is primarily used for cargo-type aircraft and helicopters and rarely for passenger flights. The Yaroslavl Air Club, which is one of Russia's oldest air clubs and where Valentina Tereshkova first began to attend flight training, is based at the Karachikha air field.

=== Water transport ===
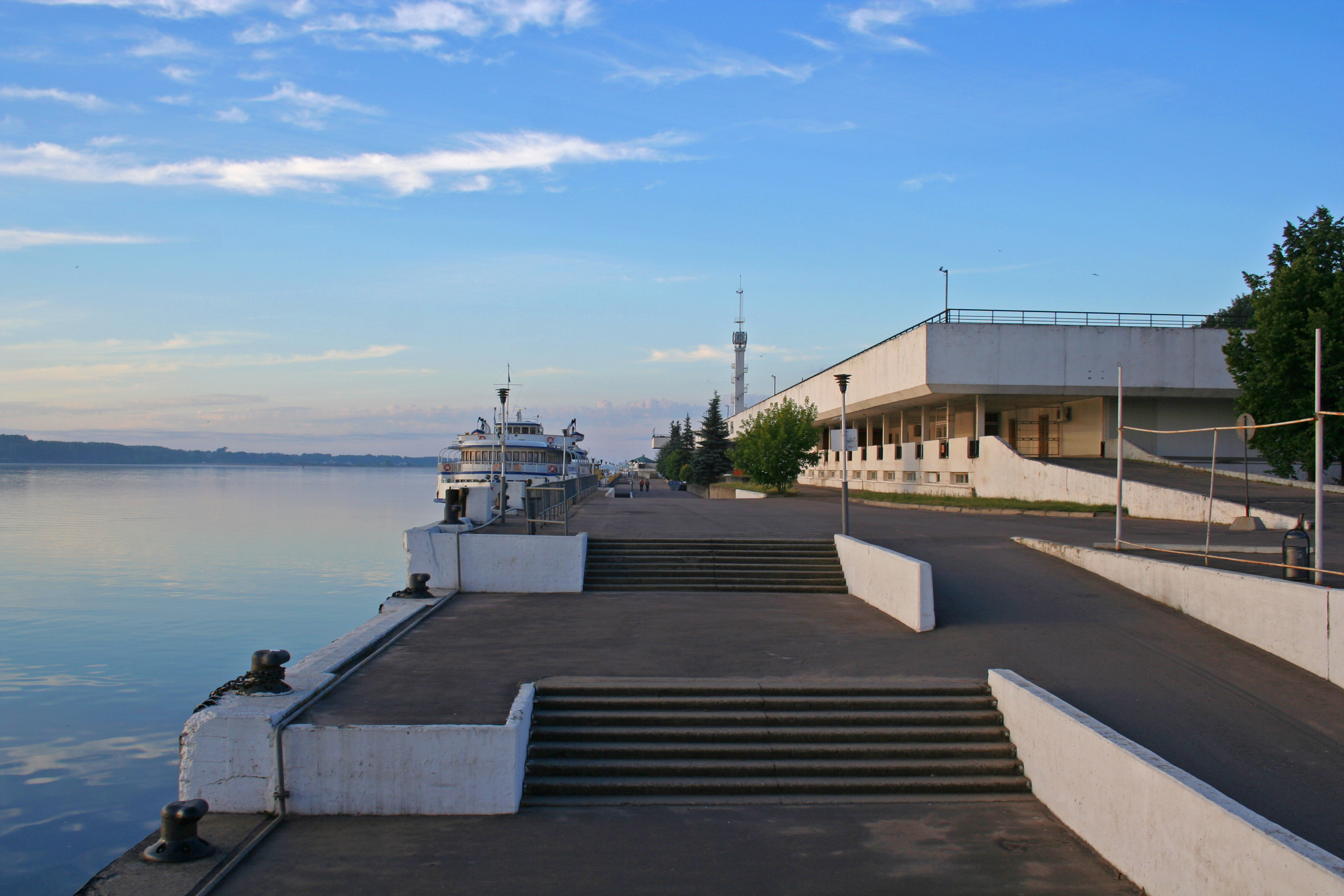
Yaroslavl River Port (1985), an example of late Soviet modernism

Yaroslavl River Port has an annual import average of around 3.5 million tonnes of freight a year. Climatic conditions allow the port to be used for six months of the year, from May to later October. The river port caters not only for larger river cruise ships which stop off in the city as part of their journey up/down the Volga, but also to a number of regular services which link Yaroslavl with Breytovo, Tolga, Konstantinovo, Bakarevo, and Novye Chentsy.

=== Public transportation ===
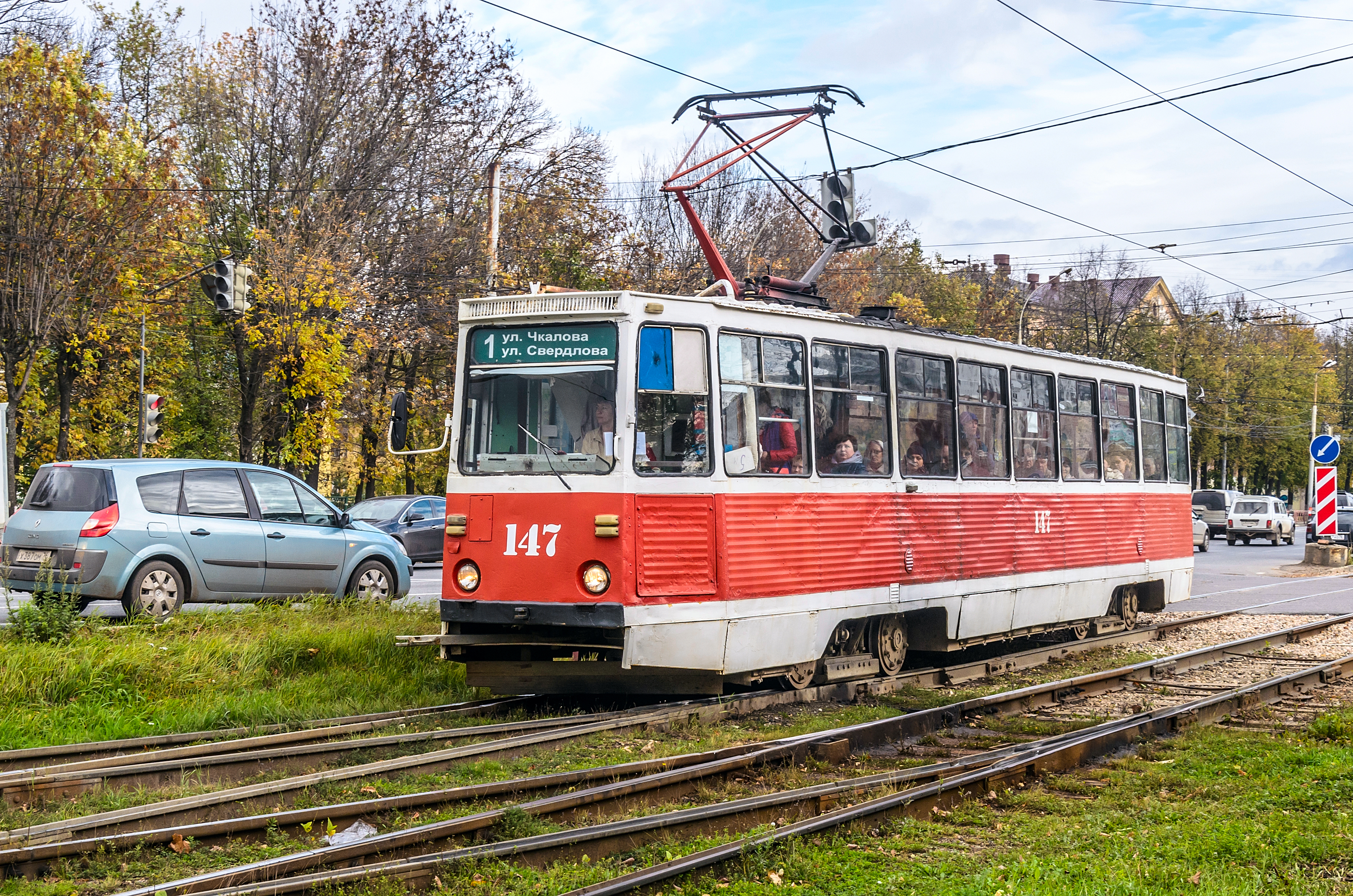
A modernised tram in service in Yaroslavl

The city has a network of public transportation, including buses, trolley-buses and tram lines. Below there is a table showing how many people used different types of transport in a number of given years (millions of people):

	2007	2008	2009
Municipal and private bus services	65.4	64.9	74.5
Trams	24.6	19.7	16.3
Trolleybuses	43.5	35.7	30.4

Every day, over 600 different bus routes are run by a large consortium of both small and large buses and private shuttle buses.

The Yaroslavl tram system is one of the oldest in Russia and has been in existence since 1900. As of 2011, this system is made up of four routes which run through various parts of the city. Starting in 2004 the number of routes run by trams throughout the city has been steadily reduced, and whilst in 2006 trams could be found in both the historic city center and the Krasnoperekopsky District, the routes serving these areas have now disappeared altogether. While at the beginning of the 21st century, the number of tramcars used by the Yaroslavl tram system stood at around 100, this has now fallen (by 2011) to just 43.

Since 1949, The city's urban transport network has also run a fleet of trolleybuses that runs nine different routes.

== Sports ==
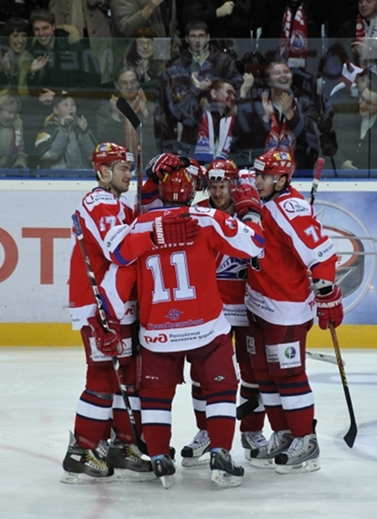
Lokomotiv Yaroslavl players on the ice in 2009

FC Shinnik Yaroslavl is an association football club based in Yaroslavl. It plays in the Russian First Division.

Lokomotiv Yaroslavl is the city's ice hockey team, which was the champion of Russia in 1996–1997, 2001–2002, and 2002–2003 seasons. On September 7, 2011, all players on the team were killed in the 2011 Lokomotiv Yaroslavl plane crash, when the plane in which they were travelling for their first match of the season crashed on takeoff from Yaroslavl airport. As tribute to the team, the city co-hosted the 2012 Canada–Russia Challenge with Halifax, Nova Scotia.

== Notable people ==
- Arsen Ayrapetyan, Russian football player of Armenian descent
- Artem Anisimov, NHL hockey player
- Denis Grebeshkov, hockey player
- Elena Grosheva, Olympic gymnast
- Lyubov Ivanovskaya, triathlete
- Andrei Khomutov, hockey player
- Aleksandr Lyapunov (1857–1918), mathematician, mechanician and physicist
- Anna Malova, Miss Russia 1998 and model
- Nikolay Nekrasov and Mikhail Kuzmin, poets
- Ivan Nepryaev, hockey player
- Aleksandr Petrov (animator), Oscar-winning animator
- Ivan Provorov, NHL hockey player
- Konstantin Alekseevich Satunin (1863–1915), zoologist
- Alexander Shibaev, table tennis player
- Alex Sipiagin, musician
- Leonid Sobinov, opera singer
- Boris Stark, missionary and priest
- Vladimir Tarasenko, NHL hockey player
- Maksim Tarasov, Olympic pole vaulter
- Valentina Tereshkova (born 1937), first woman in space
- Artemy Troitsky, rock critic
- Alexander Vasyunov, hockey player
- Fyodor Volkov, founder of the first Russian theater
- Konstantin Ushinsky (1823–1871), founder of Russian pedagogics

== Twin towns – sister cities ==
Yaroslavl is twinned with:

- Burgas, Bulgaria, until 2022
- Burlington, United States (suspended in 2022)
- Dubnica nad Váhom, Slovakia
- Exeter, United Kingdom (suspended in 2022)
- Hanau, Germany, until 2022
- Jyväskylä, Finland, until 2022
- Kassel, Germany
- Nanjing, China
- Palermo, Italy, until 2022
- Poitiers, France
