= Yaroslavl Global Policy Forum =

Organization

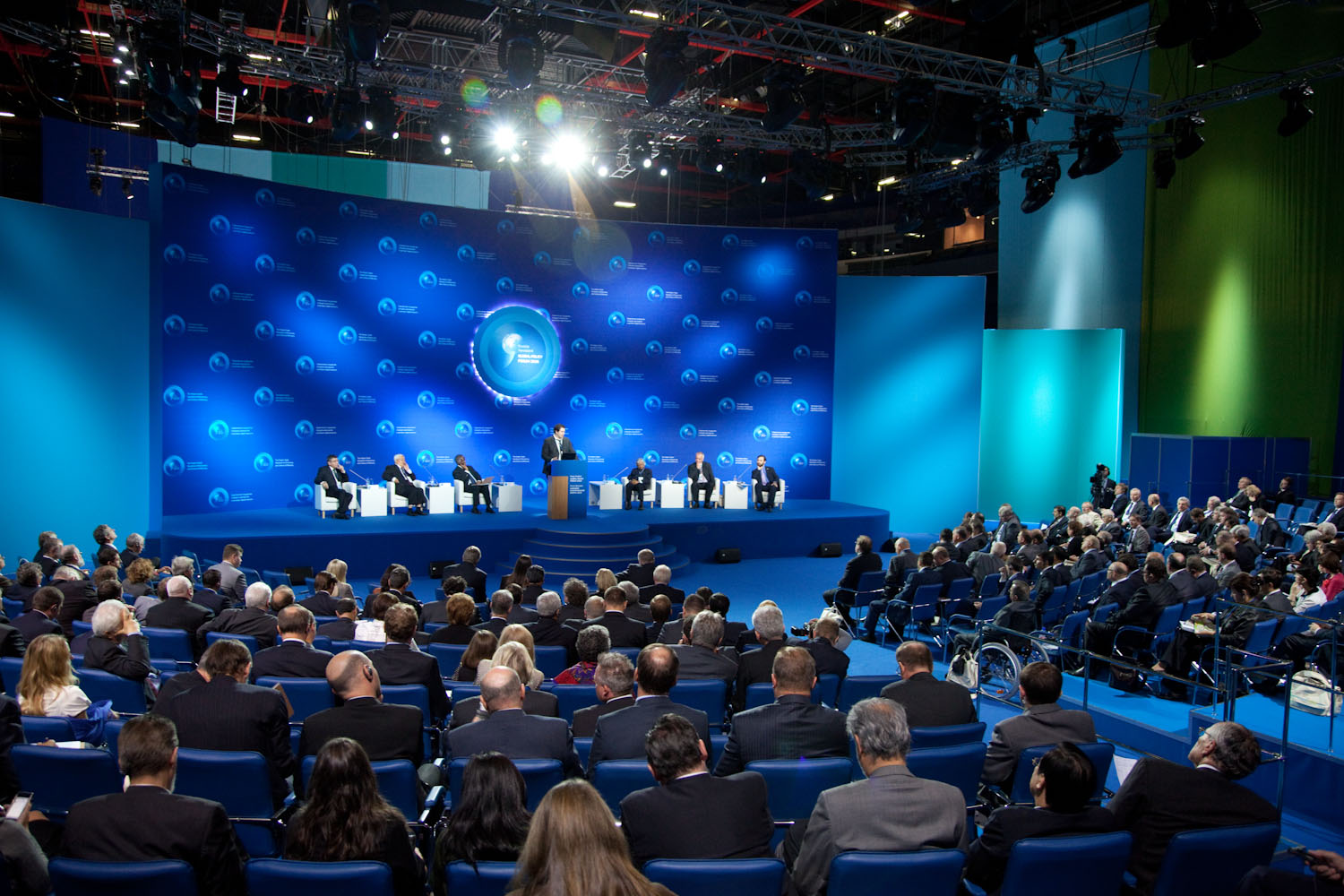
- 2010 Yaroslavl Global Policy Forum
- Formation: 2009
- Type: Forum
- Headquarters: Yaroslavl

Yaroslavl Global Policy Forum was a series of high-level conferences organized in Yaroslavl, Russia, during the term of Dmitry Medvedev as President of the Russian Federation. The forum, which targeted foreign experts, was established in 2009 by Medvedev, who determined that Valdai Discussion Club was too closely linked to Vladimir Putin. The Yaroslavl Forum was organized around Medvedev's birthday, which occurred around the same time as Putin's Valdai conference.

Medvedev gave significant speeches at the forum, including a speech at the September 2010 forum (entitled "The Modern State: Standards of Democracy and Criteria of Efficiency"), in which Medvedev "told a large audience of academics, politicians, and economists ... that parliamentary democracy would provide a 'catastrophe' for Russia" by leading to social upheaval and turmoil. Among the notable persons who attended the forums were Italian prime minister Silvio Berlusconi and American Nobel laureate economic Paul Krugman, and Michael McFaul. The conferences were "largely presented as the Russian equivalent of the annual World Economic Forum in Davos." However, as Medvedev's influence waned, the Global Policy Forum "soon exhausted its potential ... and became nearly forgotten."
