= M. C. Nandeesha =

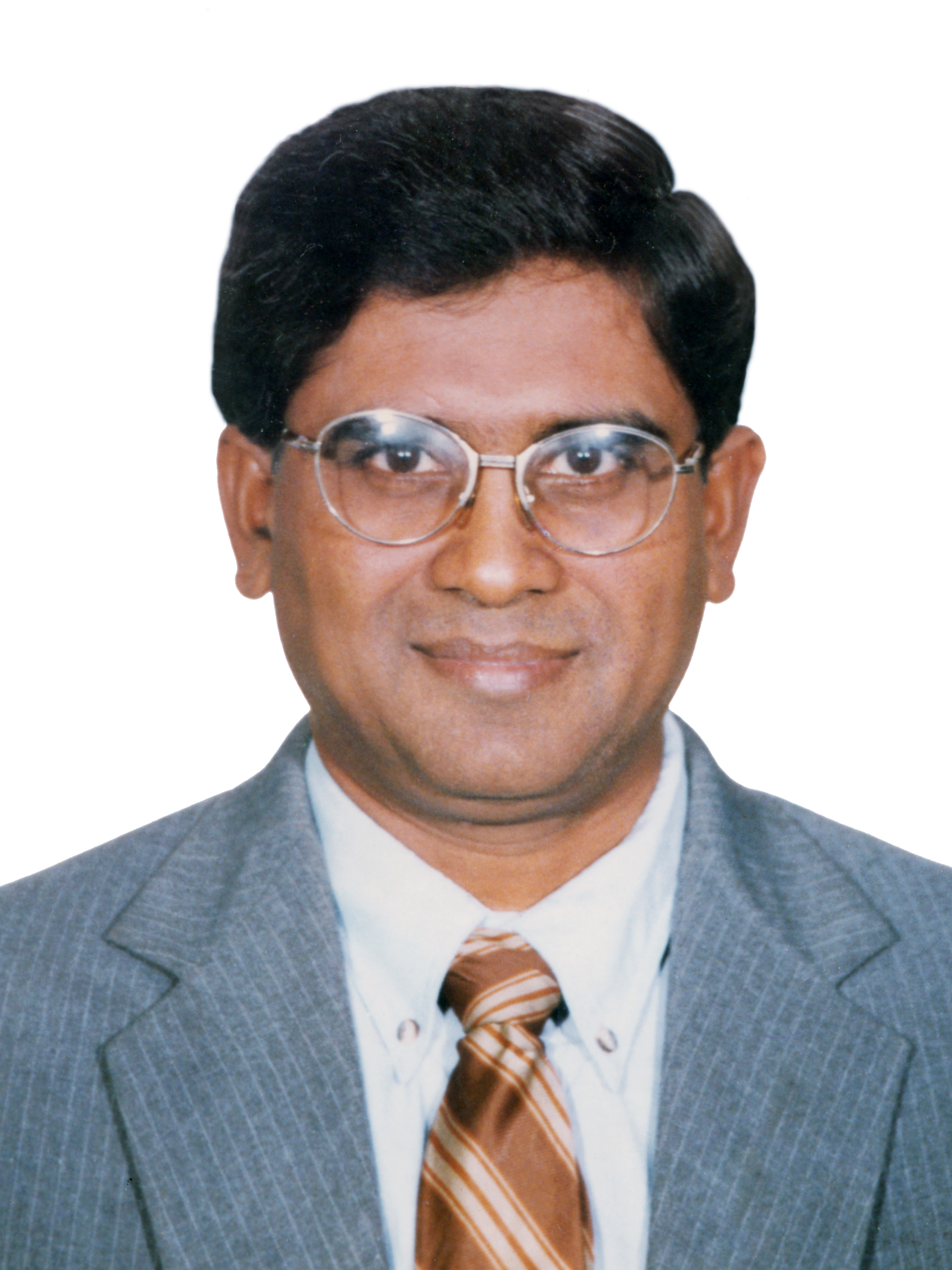
- Born: Mudnakudu Channabasappa Nandeesha; 1 July 1957; Mudnakudu, Karnataka, India
- Died: 27 December 2012 (aged 55)
- Known for: Aquaculture research Promoting gender equality Supporting farmer innovations Aquaculture professionalisation
- Awards: 2006: Sahameitrei award (Knight), Cambodia; 2012: Fellow, The World Aquaculture Society

Mudnakudu Channabasappa Nandeesha (1 July 1957 – 27 December 2012) was a development researcher, innovative aquaculture development worker and educator. He is recognized for making critical contributions to the rapid growth of aquaculture by applying research to key bottlenecks to fish production. In India, he conducted successful pioneering field tests of Ovaprim, an ovulating agent, under different agro-climatic conditions to help remove a critical early barrier for freshwater fish breeding. His significant scientific contributions include simplified breeding technology for cyprinids and development of feeds and feeding techniques appropriate to rural aquaculture, and helping improve and spread the practices of small scale fish farming at a time when most attention was on large scale producers. He wrote a regular and widely acclaimed column in Network of Aquaculture Centers in Asia-Pacific (NACA) Aquaculture Asia magazine on farmer innovations in aquaculture. He was described as an "ambassador for aquaculture" and was especially noted for promoting aquaculture for the disadvantaged poor households and women. Along with Michael New, in 2003 he was a founding member of the not-for-profit organisation, Aquaculture without Frontiers. While encouraging poor people to take up aquaculture, he was also a pioneer in promoting equity for women, who had been neglected in the aquaculture boom. Throughout his career, he was in the forefront of initiatives to upgrade the professionalism of fisheries and aquaculture experts, and inspired peers and students in critical new directions.

His professional career, which began in the 1980s, made significant contributions during the important early rapid development of Indian, Asian and world aquaculture. In this period, aquaculture became and remains the fastest growing food production sector. For Indian major carps (see catla, mrigal and rohu), of which about 5 million tonnes are now produced annually (compared to just over 200 thousand tonnes in 1980), Nandeesha established critical improved breeding and seed production approaches, and feed and nutrition regimes, and began his promotion of women's roles and the need for gender equality in fisheries and aquaculture. In Cambodia, he pioneered the spread of small scale fish farming and fish seed production. In Bangladesh, he encouraged farmer-participatory research and elevated the importance of the role of women in Bangladesh aquaculture. When working in Cambodia and Bangladesh, Nandeesha was motivated by the conditions he witnessed to create more inclusive aquaculture development concerned with helping farmers and their households in poverty eradication and food security and nutrition, and in building human resources. While subsequently working for international agencies in several countries, he energized the field of aquaculture research for development and worked in developing its professional societies and human resources, and creating professional international institutional partnerships.

Nandeesha received several honors for his work. He was formally honored by government and professional society awards at several levels: national, among which were the Royal Order of Sahametrei Knight Award by the Prime Minister of Cambodia, and the Asian Fisheries Society Indian Branch gold medal; regional, e.g., Asian Fisheries Society gold medal; and global, e.g., World Aquaculture Society fellow. He held leadership positions in several professional and industry societies, one of which, the Asian Fisheries Society Indian Branch he helped create. He helped build stronger and new higher education institutions for aquaculture, including the Tamil Nadu Fisheries University that he helped build out of the Fisheries College and Research Institute, Thoothukudi, Tamil Nadu. He was Vice-Chancellor Designate when he died. Posthumously, his contributions were recognized by special tributes from his peers, and an FAO sponsored course in advanced fisheries and aquaculture economics named in his honor. In honors reserved for few people, the Asian Fisheries Society, World Aquaculture Society and Asian Fisheries Society Indian Branch, have named awards in his honor.

== Biography ==
=== Early years and education ===
Nandeesha was born in Mudnakudu, a village near Mysore, Karnataka, into a rural farming family. He was educated at primary and secondary school in the village of his birth. He attended the College of Fisheries, Mangalore, Karnataka, India, and gained a Bachelor of Fisheries Science (1976–1980) and Master of Fisheries Science (1987–1992). He gained his Ph.D. in zoology/fisheries from Visva-Bharati University, Santiniketan, West Bengal, India. His thesis title was "Formulation and evaluation of artificial diets for carps."

=== Career ===
After obtaining his first degree, Nandeesha's fisheries career began in 1982 when he served, until 1985, as a Research Assistant (Fisheries) in the Agriculture College, University of Agricultural Sciences, Dharwad. India. He then became an Assistant Professor (1985–1992), in the Department of Aquaculture, College of Fisheries Mangalore, India.

In 1992, Nandeesha took up a development position in Cambodia, working until 1997 as Fisheries Adviser for the non-governmental organisation (NGO) Partnership for Development in Kampuchea (Padek), Phnom Penh, Cambodia and serving as Adjunct Professor with the Fisheries Faculty of Royal University of Agriculture, Royal Government of Cambodia, Phnom Penh, Cambodia. He returned briefly to India in 1997–98 as an Associate Professor in the Department of Aquaculture, College of Fisheries, University of Agricultural Sciences, Mangalore, before moving back to development work, this time in Bangladesh.

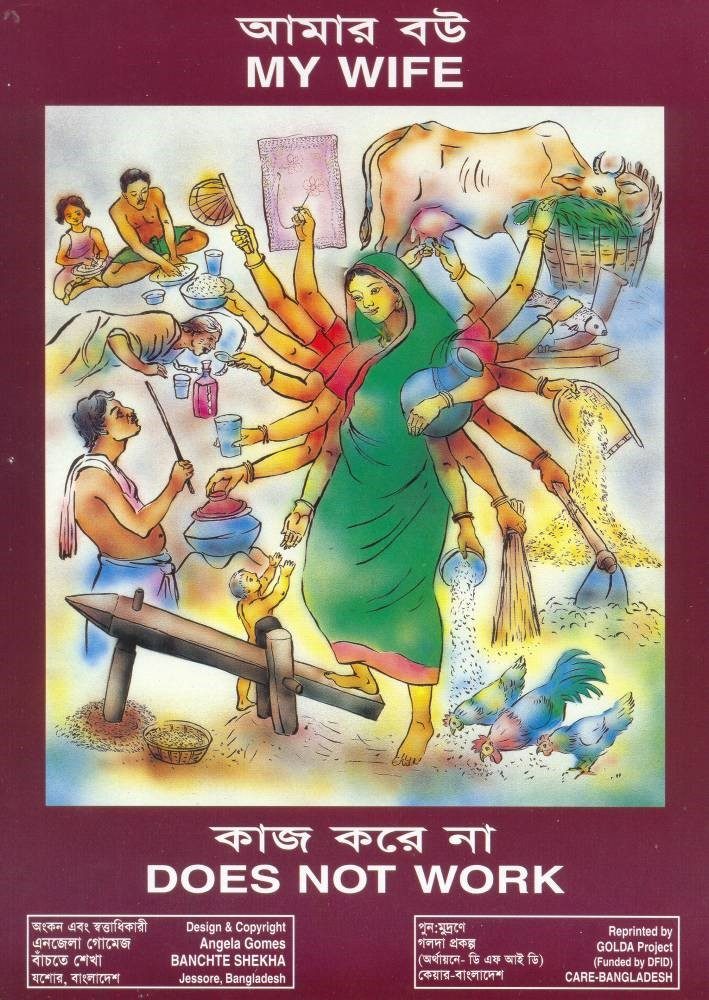
"My Wife Does Not Work" was a poster that M. C. Nandeesha conceptualised. It was then designed by Angela Gomes, printed by Banchte Shekha, Jessore, Bangladesh and reprinted by the CARE-Bangladesh GOLDA project. Melissa Williams also refers to a BRAC version of this poster, sourcing the original to Banchte Shekha.

From 1998 to 2001, he worked for CARE Bangladesh in the Agriculture and Natural Resources Sector, committed to two major aquaculture projects, first as Research and Dissemination Advisor to LIFE (Locally Intensified Farming Enterprise) Project and then as Project Coordinator of the GOLDA (Greater Options for Local Development through Aquaculture) Project. In these projects, he worked with many local Bangladeshi non-government organisations, such as Banchte Shekha, a women-led organisation (see poster "My Wife Does Not Work").

In 2001 he returned to India and soon took up the challenge to become Professor and Department-in-Charge at the new College of Fisheries, Central Agricultural University, Tripura State, northeast India, a position he held until 2008. From 2008 to 2010, he worked as an adviser to aquaculture work in Tripura and consulted to international organisations, including Network of Aquaculture Centres in Asia-Pacific (NACA), the United Nations Food and Agriculture Organization (FAO) and the World Bank.

In 2010 he became Dean of the Fisheries College and Research Institute, Thoothukudi, Tamil Nadu, moving in 2012 to become Special Officer for Tamil Nadu Fisheries University, Nagapattinam, Tamil Nadu, carrying out the preliminary work for the establishment of the university, including formulating the Act that came into effect 19 June 2012. At the time of his death, he was Vice-Chancellor designate of the Tamil Nadu Fisheries University.

Several high-profile aquaculture experts, research leaders and educators considered Nandeesha's personal influence on them to have inspired their careers.

=== Professional achievements ===
Nandeesha's professional career spanned breakthrough work in fish breeding, small scale fish farming for people's development, innovative communications for small scale aquaculture development, upgrading professional competence through building professional societies and higher education institutions, and pioneered agitation for greater gender equality in fisheries and aquaculture.

==== Fish breeding for aquaculture ====
Nandeesha led significant breakthroughs in improving fish production in India when he tested the use of Ovaprim, a synthetic hormone preparation produced in Canada for inducing breeding of carps based on research in China and Canada. Following successful testing of Ovaprim on catla (Catla catla), rohu (Labeo rohita) and mrigal (Cirrhinus mrigala), the procedure was trialed on 8 species of carps in 9 states of India, with outstanding results. The uptake of this technology was a turning point in the culture of Indian carps, removing a bottleneck in fish breeding for supplying sufficient fry.

As he moved into development assistance, focusing on small scale farmers, his interest in how farmers could procure adequate supplies of affordable, quality fish seed remained a commitment in all his subsequent work. He took an active part in the 2006 FAO Expert Workshop and study on Freshwater Fish Seed Resources for Sustainable Aquaculture, leading to the publication of the FAO assessment report.

==== Fish feeds ====
Along with fish breeding, fish feeds are critical to the success of fish farming. In parallel with his fish breeding work, M.C. Nandeesaha was very active in the early work on fish feeds for the freshwater species such as Anabas testudineus (climbing perch), Catla catla, other carps and other freshwater fish species, especially focusing on finding non-conventional, locally available and nutritionally effective feed ingredients.

==== Aquaculture for human development ====
From the start of his professional career, Nandeesha's driving reason for working in aquaculture was to benefit the farmers and those their products fed. When he began development assistance work in Cambodia in 1992, he was confronted by people seeking opportunities as they emerged from the ravages of decades of war. Grasping the issues confronting farmers and potential farmers, he worked with people on farm-made aquafeeds, the overall aquaculture situation and the opportunities for bringing native Mekong River fish species into aquaculture. When he arrived in Cambodia, he was also confronted by the demographic impacts of war, with the population comprising 65% women. The women were contributing more than men in small scale aquaculture. His NGO employer, PADEK (Partnership for Development in Kampuchea) provided a platform for reaching women and helping improve their knowledge and farming performance. This would also accelerate work he had begun in India on engaging others in helping women improve their economic participation in fisheries and aquaculture (see Gender equality in aquaculture and fisheries).

In 1997, the Royal Government of Cambodia recognized him and his PADEK colleagues for "contributions to Human Resource Development at the Royal University of Agriculture, Cambodia." In 2006, the Prime Minister of Cambodia awarded Nandeesha with a Royal Order of Sahametrei Knight Award, a civilian honour of the Government of Cambodia, for contributions to fisheries development of Cambodia during work in Cambodia from 1992 to 1997.

After Cambodia, Nandeesha's next major assignment was in Bangladesh where he worked with CARE-Bangladesh as the research and dissemination advisor for the LIFE (Locally Intensified Farming Enterprise) Project and Project Coordinator for the GOLDA (Greater Options for Local Development through Aquaculture) Project. Through his work here, and later from India, on the culture of the giant freshwater prawn (Macrobrachium rosenbergii - also called golda in Bangladesh and India), he made the extremely important point that it was the farmers themselves who first experimented with the integration of giant freshwater prawn into their agricultural systems, i.e. the rice field or gher, in southwest Bangladesh. The farmers were the innovators in the "gher revolution". This demonstrated the suitability of this commercial, but low-external input system for small-scale farmers because it fitted into and added value to their existing enterprise. Macrobrachium culture also became another field in which Nandeesha's knowledge was respected and in which he published.

From Bangladesh, Nandeesha moved to Tripura, a small geographically isolated state in northern India. There, as professor and head of the Department of Aquaculture, he developed undergraduate and postgraduate programs in aquaculture and led studies on the farming systems of the northeastern area of India with many fish eaters but a large demand-supply gap in fish. He was able to bring in his now considerable knowledge of farming systems, breeds, feeds and sharpen his keen eye for learning from farmers' own innovations. More frequently, he was being called on by FAO and other international agencies for aquaculture development advice.

In all his efforts to develop aquaculture to help people improve their own lives. Nandeesha worked in and with several types of expert agencies, from universities to development non-government organisations (NGOs), through to international development agencies.

==== Gender equality in aquaculture and fisheries ====
As a critical strategy in bringing aquaculture to small scale farmers, Nandeesha led field projects and worked through institutions and professional societies to promote gender equity and enhance women's opportunities and recognition. His contributions were pivotal and have led to sustained action and institutions.

In 1990, he initiated the "Women in Fisheries in India" workshop of the Asian Fisheries Society Indian Branch (AFSIB), a first in an Asian country. Between 1992 and 1997, when working for Padek in Cambodia, he was confronted by a population depleted by the civil war, during which men suffered even greater losses than women, leaving many households headed by women. Women became key partners in Padek's aquaculture development. The 1994 "Women in Cambodian Fisheries" workshop Nandeesha led also highlighted how women contributed in capture fisheries in the Mekong River and Tonle Sap, and were vital in the fish markets. From 1998 to 2001, Nandeesha worked for the Agriculture and Natural Resources section of CARE-Bangladesh when it decided to focus on helping women in aquaculture, building on the women's skills in home vegetable gardening and livestock. In practice, helping women proved difficult, particularly because almost all the extensionists were men with little appreciation of women's needs and of how they learned. To overcome the challenges, CARE took three steps. The first was specifying project goals for women's participation; the second choosing extension methods and interventions that were best able to benefit women; and the third, most difficult, step was building a more gender-sensitive organisation.

As he worked on these projects, Nandeesha built an ever-widening set of professional partnerships that eventually created a sustained pathway for raising awareness of women's contributions to fisheries and aquaculture. The partnerships spread to Indo-China countries, Asia-wide, and worldwide. The partnerships broadened into a collaborative gender equality platform for researchers, including students, development workers and activists.

In 2017, the Asian Fisheries Society officially launched its Gender in Aquaculture and Fisheries Section, building on the work Nandeesha started in 1990 with the Women in Fisheries in India Workshop.[46][20] This is the first formal gender section in a mainstream fisheries or aquaculture society.

==== Communicating, sharing and spreading the lessons learned ====
AFS, AFSIB, WAS, NACA, FAO, AwF; communications, Farmers as Scientists

==== Helping build the professional institutions in aquaculture ====
India (education, societies – AFS-IB, AFS, WAS); Infrastructure improvement (education, accommodation); Mangalore FC, AFSIB, Tripura, TNFU

== Professional offices ==
- Director, World Aquaculture Society Board of Directors (2006–2009)
- Chairman, Asian Fisheries Society, Indian Branch, Mangalore, India (2011–2012)
- Team Member, GILLS (Global Initiative for Life and Leadership through Aquaculture)
- Chair, Aquaculture without Frontiers, (2009–2012); Director, (2007 -2010)
- Member, Oversight Committee of Best Aquaculture Practices of the Global Aquaculture Alliance (2009–2012)
- Councillor, Asian Fisheries Society, (2011–2012)

== Awards received ==
During his career, Nandeesha's work was recognized and he received many awards. Typically, he deposited prize-money into funds to help support young researchers. Among his awards were:

- 2012: Fellow, The World Aquaculture Society
- 2008: Best Teacher award, 2004–2007, Professional Fisheries Graduates Forum (India)
- 2008: Prof. H.P.C.Shetty gold Medal Award for excellence in Research and Development, Asian Fisheries Society, Indian Branch
- 2007: Gold Medal Award, Asian Fisheries Society for contributions to Aquaculture and the Society
- 2006: Sahameitrei award (Knight), civilian honour of the Government of Cambodia for contributions to fisheries development of Cambodia during work in Cambodia from 1992–97
- 2003: Best Teacher award, Professional Fisheries Graduates Forum, Bombay, India
- 2002: International Foundation for Science, Sweden, Jubilee Award for excellence in Aquaculture Nutrition Research
- 2000: Asian Fisheries Society, Indian Branch, Vth Indian Fisheries Forum for contributions to the sustained development of the Society
- 1997: Citation, Royal Government of Cambodia, for contributions to Human Resource Development at the Royal University of Agriculture, Cambodia
- 1991: Research Excellence Citation, Syndel Laboratories, Canada for work on fish breeding
- 1989: Association of Food Scientists and Technologists (India) Young Scientist Award for contributions in the field of Fish Nutrition
- 1989: Nagamma Dattareya Rao Desai Award, University of Agricultural Sciences for contributions to the enhancement of aquaculture production in Karnataka, India by improved breeding techniques
- 1987: Dr. K. C. Naik Memorial Award, Asian Fisheries Society Indian Branch, for significant contributions to the establishment and development of the Asian Fisheries Society Indian Branch
- 1982: Pasteur Medal awarded by the Pasteur Society, Mangalore, India for outstanding contributions made to the development of the Society

== Events and awards in his honour ==
=== M. C. Nandeesha Photo Competition, GAF-India 2017 ===
In 2017, the Asian Fisheries Society Indian Branch, through the Gender in Aquaculture and Fisheries Section of the Asian Fisheries Society, conducted the M. C. Nandeesha Photo Competition for photographs depicting gender equality themes.

=== Asian Fisheries Society Indian Branch: Prof. M. C. Nandeesha Gender Justice & Equality Award 2017 ===
Awarded to Dr Meryl J. Williams, Honorary Life Member, Asian Fisheries Society, "In recognition of her pioneering and sustaining efforts towards drawing international attention and developing impacting interventions in gender justice and equality in the Asian Aquaculture and Fisheries sector."

=== M. C. Nandeesha Best Presentation Award, GAF6 2016 ===
In recognition of M. C. Nandeesha's role in initiating the Gender in Fisheries and Aquaculture and Fisheries Symposia (GF) of the Asian Fisheries Society nearly 20 years ago, the primary award for GAF6 was named in his honor.

=== 11th Indian Fisheries and Aquaculture Forum 2017 Dr. M. C. Nandeesha Award ===
This award is given for the best innovation by a fish farmer. The award carries a cash prize of Rs. 25000 and a citation.

=== International Course: Advanced Lessons on Fisheries and Aquaculture Economics 2013 ===
The International Course in 2013 was made "A Tribute to Prof. M. C. Nandeesha (1957–2012)". It was held at Santander, Spain, from 22 to 26 July 2013. In memory of Nandeesha, it included sponsorship from the United Nations Food and Agriculture Organization of 8 students from developing countries.

== Personal life ==
Dr. Nandeesha's spouse, Dr. Rajeswari Dayal, provided invaluable professional support throughout, performing professional office work, documentation and management. They have a son Aditya.

== Publications ==
Nandeesha published more than 100 articles plus book chapters and reports between 1986 and 2012. A selection are given here (see also Google Scholar for further publications):

- Williams, M. J., Agbayani, R., Bhujel, R., Bondad-Reantaso, M. G., Brugère, C., Choo, P. S., Dhont, J., Galmiche-Tejeda, A., Ghulam, K., Kusakabe, K., Little, D., Nandeesha, M. C., Sorgeloos, P., Weeratunge, N., Williams, S. & Xu. P. 2012. Sustaining aquaculture by developing human capacity and enhancing opportunities for women. In R. P. Subasinghe, J. R. Arthur, D. M. Bartley, S. S. De Silva, M. Halwart, N. Hishamunda, C. V. Mohan & P. Sorgeloos, eds. Farming the Waters for People and Food. Proceedings of the Global Conference on Aquaculture 2010, Phuket, Thailand. 22–25 September 2010. pp. 785–874. FAO, Rome and NACA, Bangkok.
- Nandeesha, M. C. and C. Okali. 2008. Family based systems for aquaculture development in Asia approaches in integrated aqua culture in Asia. 573–576. In : Gender in Agriculture – Source Book. Published by the World Bank, FAO and IFAD.
- Nandeesha, M. C. and C. Okali . 2008. CARE Bangladesh : family approaches in integrated aquaculture. 591–593. In : Gender in Agriculture – Source Book. Published by the World Bank, FAO and IFAD.
- Williams, M. J., Devi, G. A., Nandeesha, M. C. and P. S. Choo. 2006. Changing traditions: summary report on the first global look at the gender dimensions in fisheries. Proceedings of the Global Symposium on Gender and Fisheries held during the VII Asian Fisheries Forum, 30 November-4 December, 04, Penang, Malaysia ( Eds. P. S.Choo, S. J.Hall and M. J.Williams) p. 149—169. Gurumayum, S. D., G. Aruna and M. C. Nandeesha. 2006. Women participation in Fisheries activities in Manipur Valley in India with traditional fish based beliefs and customs. Proceedings of the Global Symposium on Gender and Fisheries held during the VII Asian Fisheries Forum, 30 November-4 December, 04, Penang, Malaysia ( Eds. P. S. Choo, S. J. Hall and M. J. Williams) p. 149–169.
- Siason, I. M., E. Tech, K.I. Matics, P. S. Choo, M. Shariff, T. Endang, I. Susilowati, N. Miki, N. I. Chao, L. Y. Chang, E. Y. Chang, M. Sunderarajan, A. B. Shelly, K. G. Rajabhanshi, P. P. G. N. Siriwardena, M. C. Nandeesha . 2002. Women in Fisheries in Asia. Proceedings of the Global Symposium on Women in Fisheries, ICLARM and Asian Fisheries Society Special Publication.p. 21–48.
- Nandeesha, M. C. and E.Tech. 2002. Women in Fisheries activities of the Asian Fisheries Society – have they been able to make impact. Women in Fisheries in Asia. Proceedings of the Global Symposium on Women in Fisheries, ICLARM and Asian Fisheries P-7-12.Society Special Publication.p. 7–12.
- Nandeesha, M. C., B. Gangadhara, and J. K. Manissery. 2002. Further studies on the use of mixed feeding schedules with plant and animal protein based diets for common carp, Cyprinus carpio. Aquaculture Research. 33: 1–6.
- Nandeesha, M. C., B. Gangadhara, J. K. Manissery, and L. V. Venkataramana. 2002. Growth performance of two major carps, catla (Catla catla) and rohu (Labeo rohita) fed diets containing different levels of Spirulina platensis. Bioresource Technology . 30: 11- 18.
- Nandeesha, M. C., B.Gangadhara, P.Keshavanath, and T. J. Varghese. 2000. Effect of dietary sodium chloride supplementation on growth, biochemical composition and digestive enzyme activity of young Cyprinus carpio (Linn.) and Cirrhinus mrigala (Ham.). Journal Aquaculture in the Tropics: 135–144
- Nandeesha, M. C., B. Gangadhar, T. J. Varghese and P. Keshavanath. 1998. Effect of feeding Spirulina platensis on the growth, proximate composition and organoleptic quality of common carp, Cyprinus carpio.L. Aquaculture Research.29:305–311
- Gangadhara, B., M. C. Nandeesha, T. J. Varghese and P. Keshavanath. 1997. Effect of varying protein and lipid levels on the growth of rohu, Labeo rohita. Asian Fisheries Science 10: 146–154
- Nandeesha, M. C., Krishna Murthy, D. and De Silva, S. S. 1995. Use of mixed feeding schedules in fish culture : performance of common carp, Cyprinus carpio L., on plant and animal protein based diets. Aquaculture Research, 26: 161–166.
- Nandeesha, M. C. 1993. Aquafeeds and feeding strategies in India, 213–254: In: Farm Made Feeds (M.B.New, A.G.J.Tacon and I. Csavas- Eds). Proceedings of the FAO/AADCP expert consultation on farm made Aquafeeds, 14 – 18th Dec,1992, Bangkok, Thailand, 434p.
- Nandeesha, M. C., Rao, K. G., Jayanna, R., Parker, N. C., Varghese, T. J., Keshavanath, P., Shetty, H. P. C. and Das, S. K. 1990. Successful induction of spawning in Indian major carps through single application of Ovaprim – C. P. 581-185. In :Hirano, R. and I, Hanyu (Eds.). Asian Fisheries Society, Manila, Philippines.
