= Ratargul Swamp Forest =

Swamp forest in Bangladesh

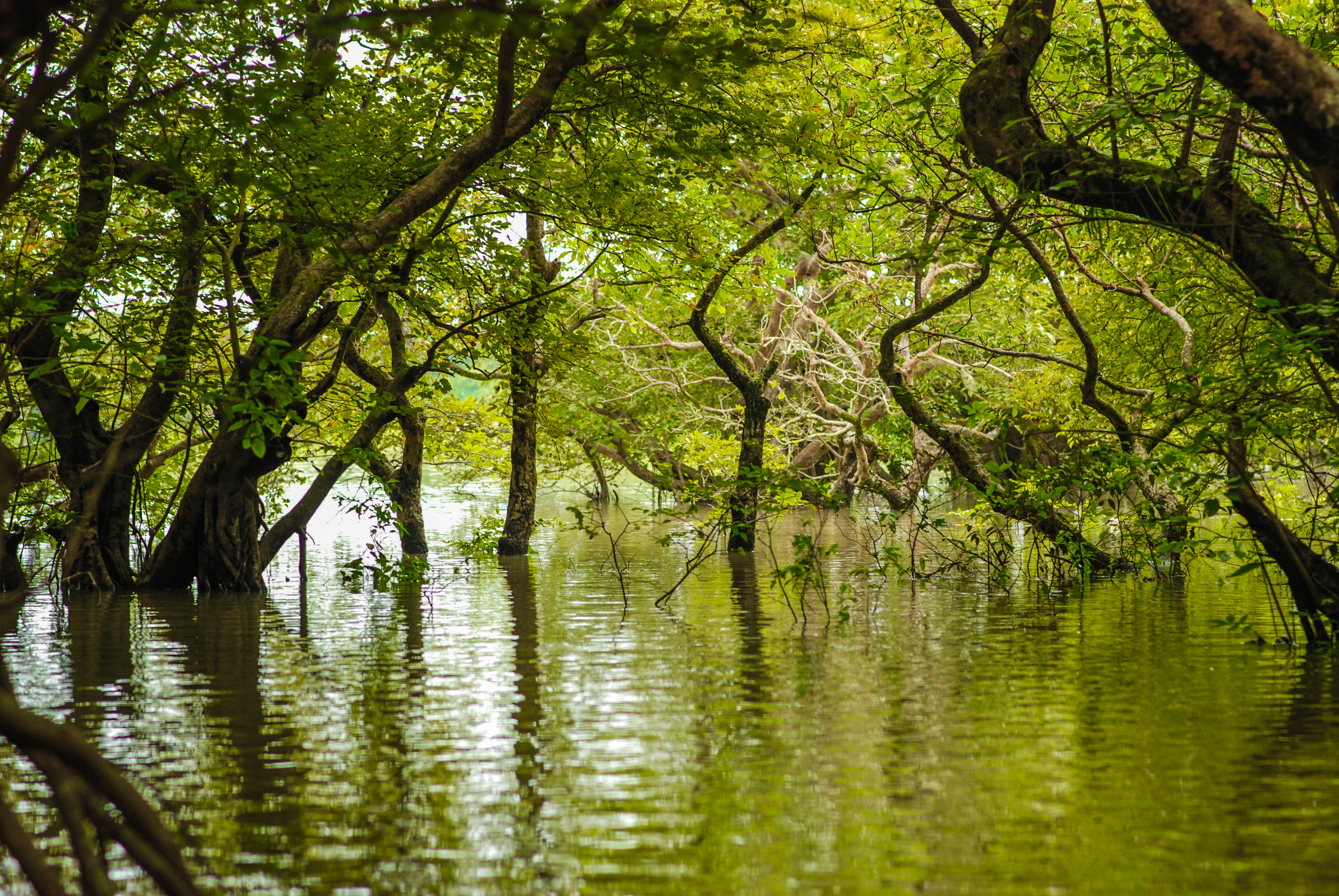
Dalbergia reniformis tree in Ratargul Swamp Forest

Ratargul Swamp Forest (Bengali: রাতারগুল জলাবন) is a freshwater swamp forest located in Gowain River, Fatehpur Union, Gowainghat, Sylhet, Bangladesh. Ratargul was once thought to be the only swamp forest in Bangladesh, and one of the few freshwater swamp forests in the world. Later, more swamp forests namely Jugirkandi Mayabon, Bujir Bon and Lokkhi Baor swamp forest were discovered in Bangladesh.

Its area is 3,325.61 acres (1,345.83 ha), including 504 acres (204 ha) declared as the animal sanctuary in 2015. It is known as the Sundarbans of Sylhet. This is the second-largest swamp forest in Bangladesh, located 26 kilometres (16 mi) from Sylhet.

The evergreen forest is situated by the river Goain and linked with the channel Chengir Khal. Most of the trees growing here are the Dalbergia reniformis (করচ গাছ Koroch tree). The forest is submerged under 20–30 ft (6.1–9.1 m) of water in the rainy season. For the rest of the year, the water level is about 10 ft (3.0 m) deep.

== Location ==
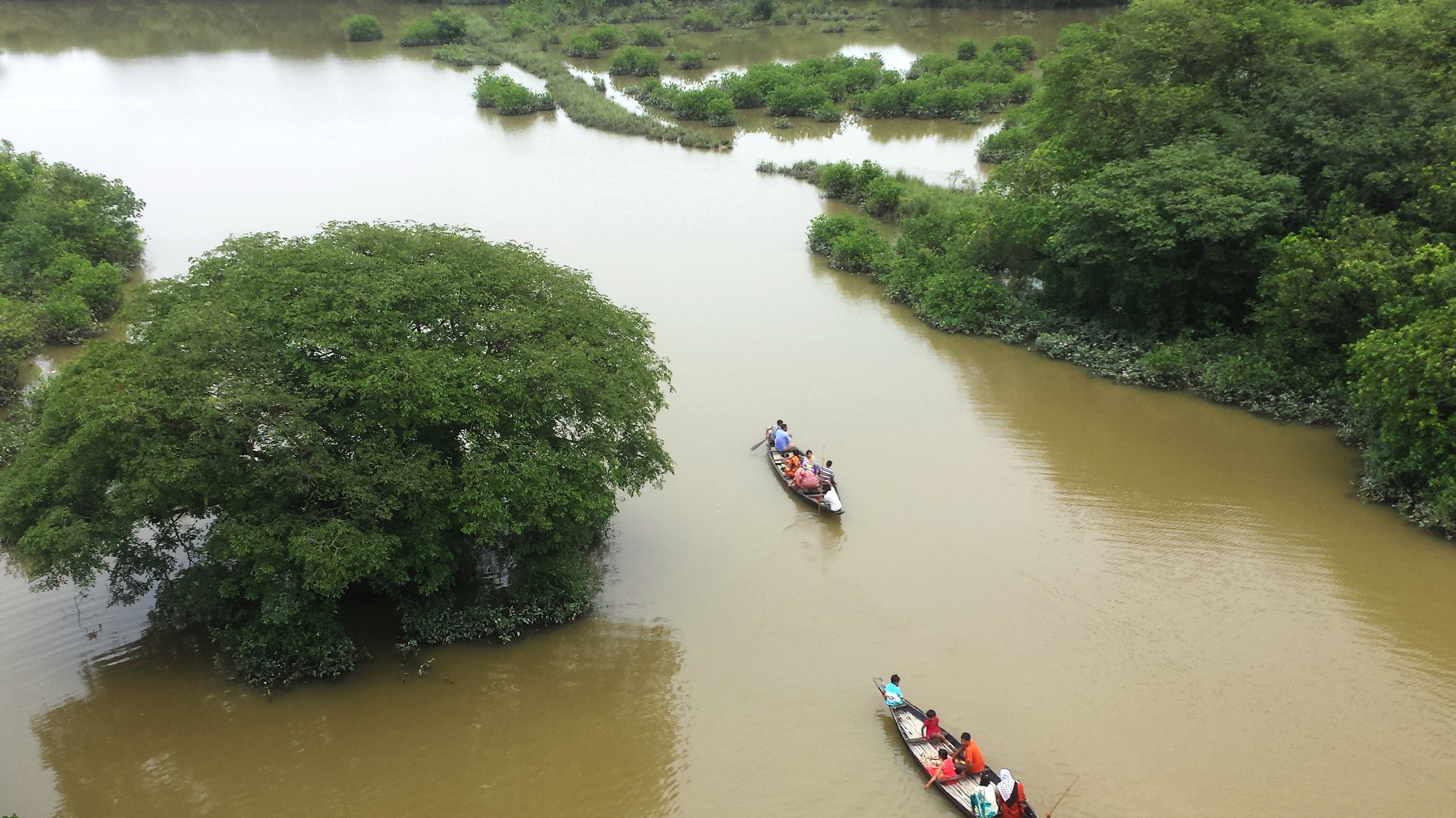
View of the swamp forest from the watchtower.

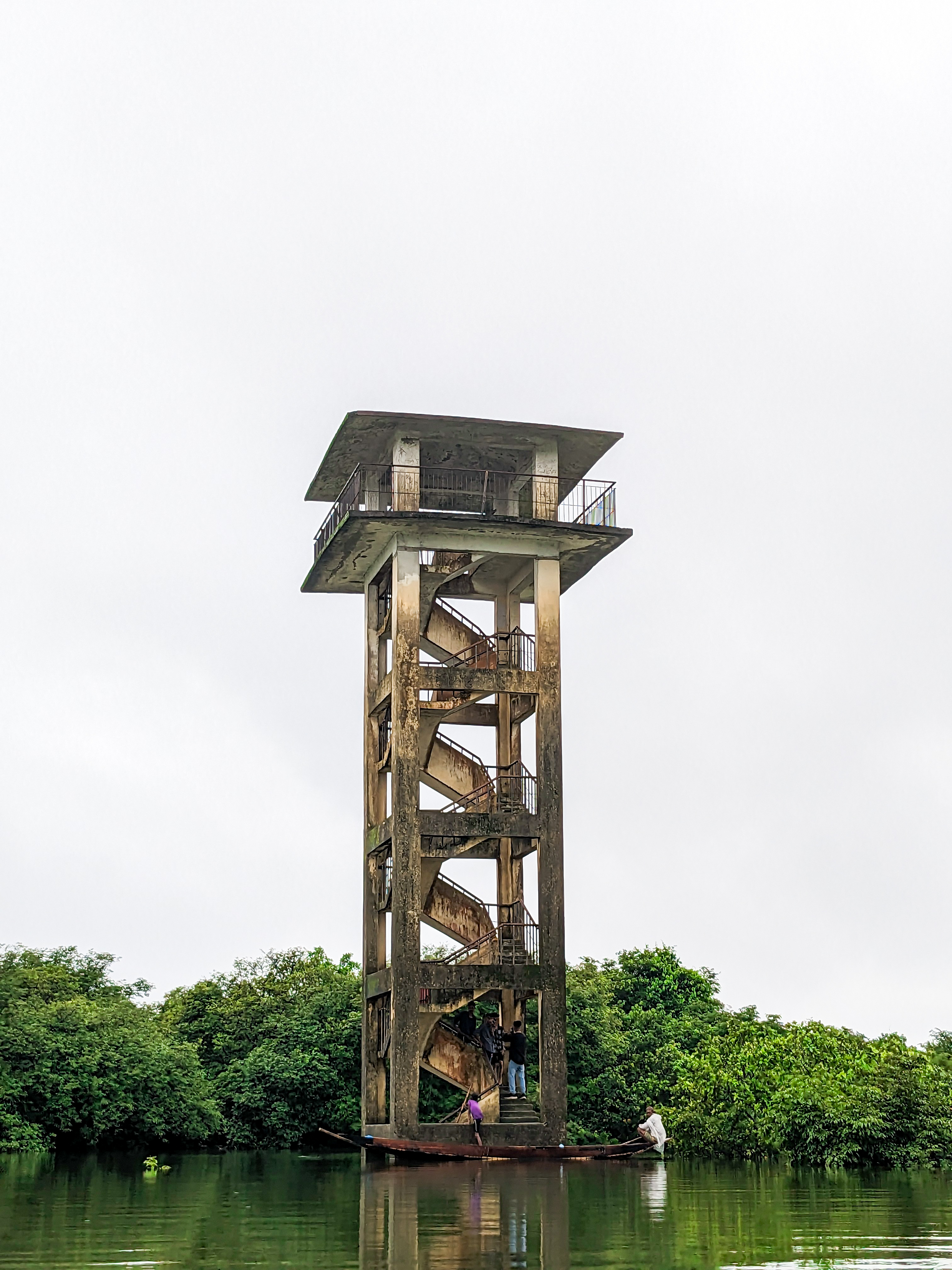
Watchtower located at the Swamp.

Ratargul is about 26 kilometres from Sylhet. There is a 3,325-acre wetland in Sylhet range-2 under the forest department, and in that wetland, Ratargul Swamp Forest is about 504 acres. It is located in Gowainghat. After reaching Gowainghat, tourists reserve a local engine boat namely "traller" to reach the forest. There are two haors, Shimul Bil Haor and Neoa Bil Haor, in the south part of the forest.

== Climate ==
Tropical air from the northwest of Sylhet causes heavy rainfall. According to the Sylhet Weather Centre, average annual rainfall is 4,162 mm (163.9 in). July hosts the most rainfall, with measures averaging 1,250 mm (49 in). December is the driest month, with 74% relative density, compared to more than 90% in July and August. The forest is linked with the Gowain River through the channel Chengir Khal. During the rainy season, water from India overflows into the channel from the Gowain River, and the forest becomes flooded. This continues through the wet season from May to early October. During this time of the year, the average high temperature hits 32 °C (90 °F), and in January, the coolest month, the average high sits around 12 °C (54 °F). During the rainy season, the trees of the swamp submerge about 10 ft (3.0 m) and in some cases up to 20 ft (6.1 m) under water, but the forest emerges during the dry season.

== Plant diversity ==
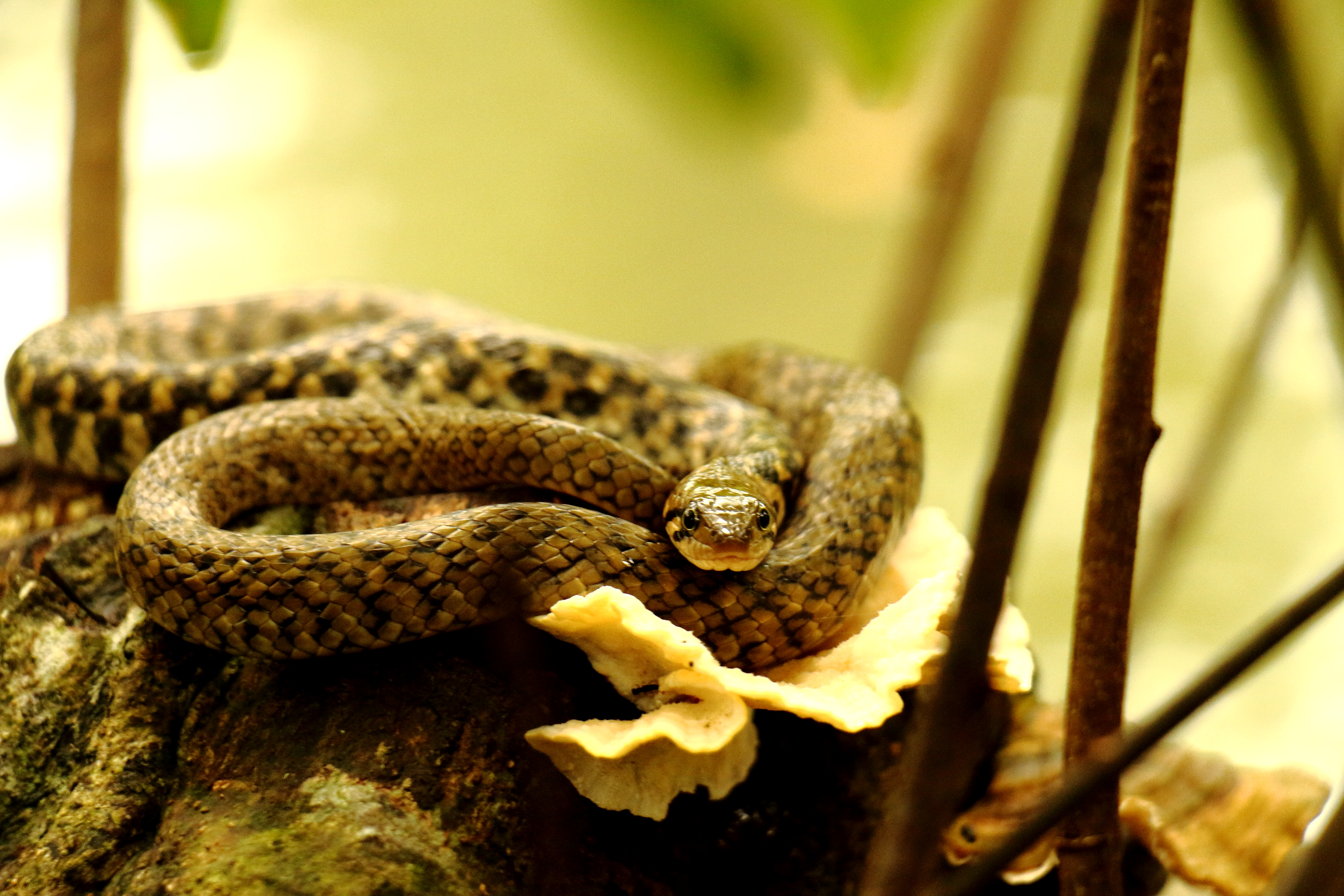
Snake in Ratagul Swamp Forest

73 species of plants could be found in the forest till now. 80 percent of the forest area is covered with an umbrella of the trees.

Two layers of plants can be seen in the swamp forest. The upper layer consists of trees, and the lower one consists of intense Schumannianthus dichotomus. The forest canopy reaches up to 15 m (49 ft) tall.

Though the forest is natural, the Forestry Department of Bangladesh has planted some watery plants like Calamus tenuis, Neolamarckia cadamba, and Barringtonia acutangula. Banyan trees are very common in the forest. Besides that, Barringtonia acutangula, Dalbergia reniformis, Crateva religiosa or Hygrophila (plant), Alstonia scholaris can also be seen.

== Animal diversity ==
Snakes and worm snakes can widely be seen in this water-drowned forest. Mongooses can be seen in the dry season. Monkeys and water monitors also reside here. Herons, egrets, kingfishers, parrots, bulbuls, swans, doves, water fowl, eagles, and kites are some of the birds of the swamp forest. Cotton pygmy geese and other migratory birds and vultures visit the forest in winter. The local names of fish present here are Batasio, Rita, Ompok, Rohu, etc.

== Tourist attractions ==
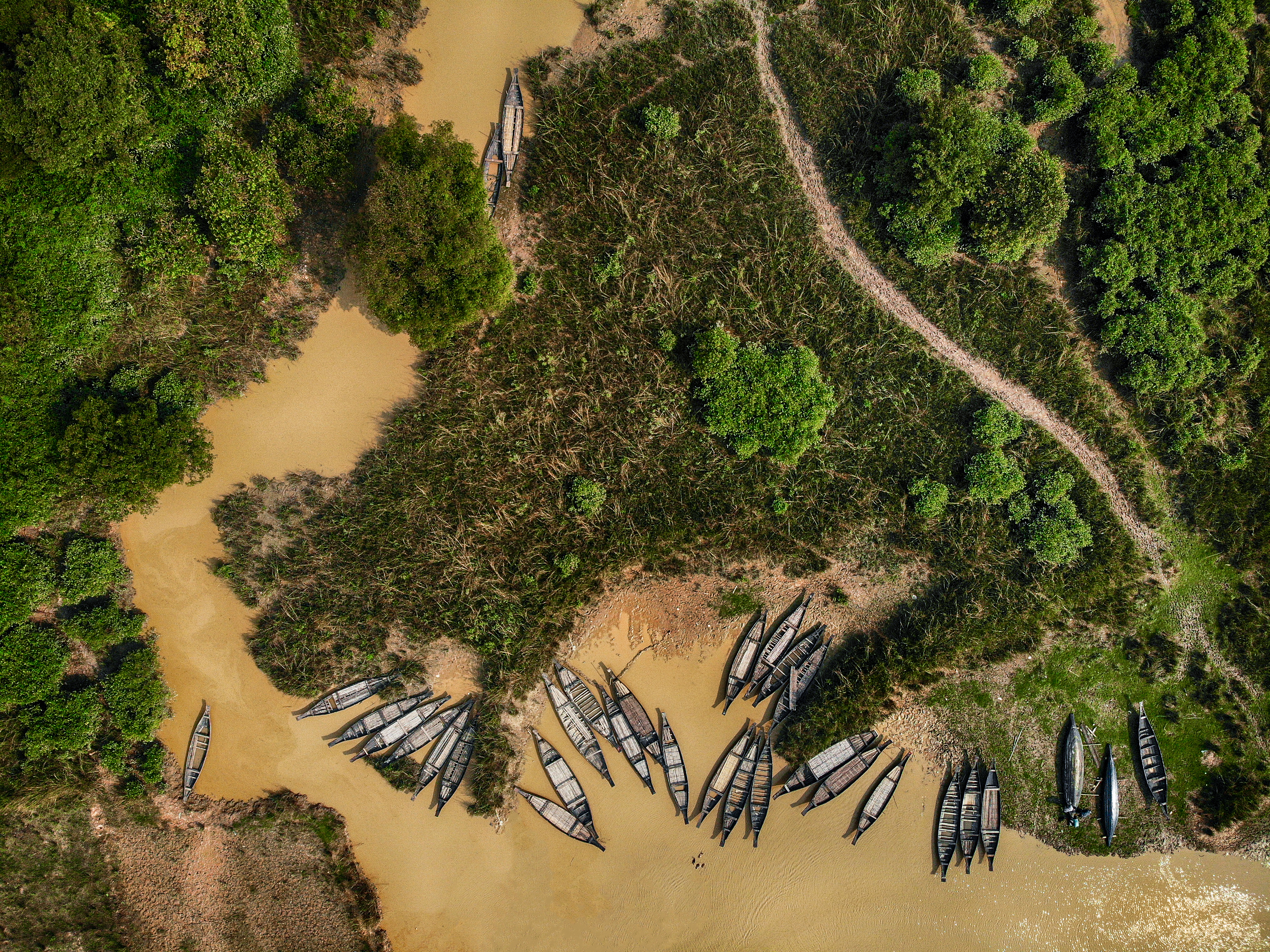
Tourists travelling on a boat in the forest.

Tourists mostly go to see the forest during the monsoon season. One needs to obtain permission from the forest office in order to visit the forest. A local boat also needs to be hired to travel through the swamp forest.

There is a watchtower inside the forest where you can overlook the whole forest from above.

== Gallery ==
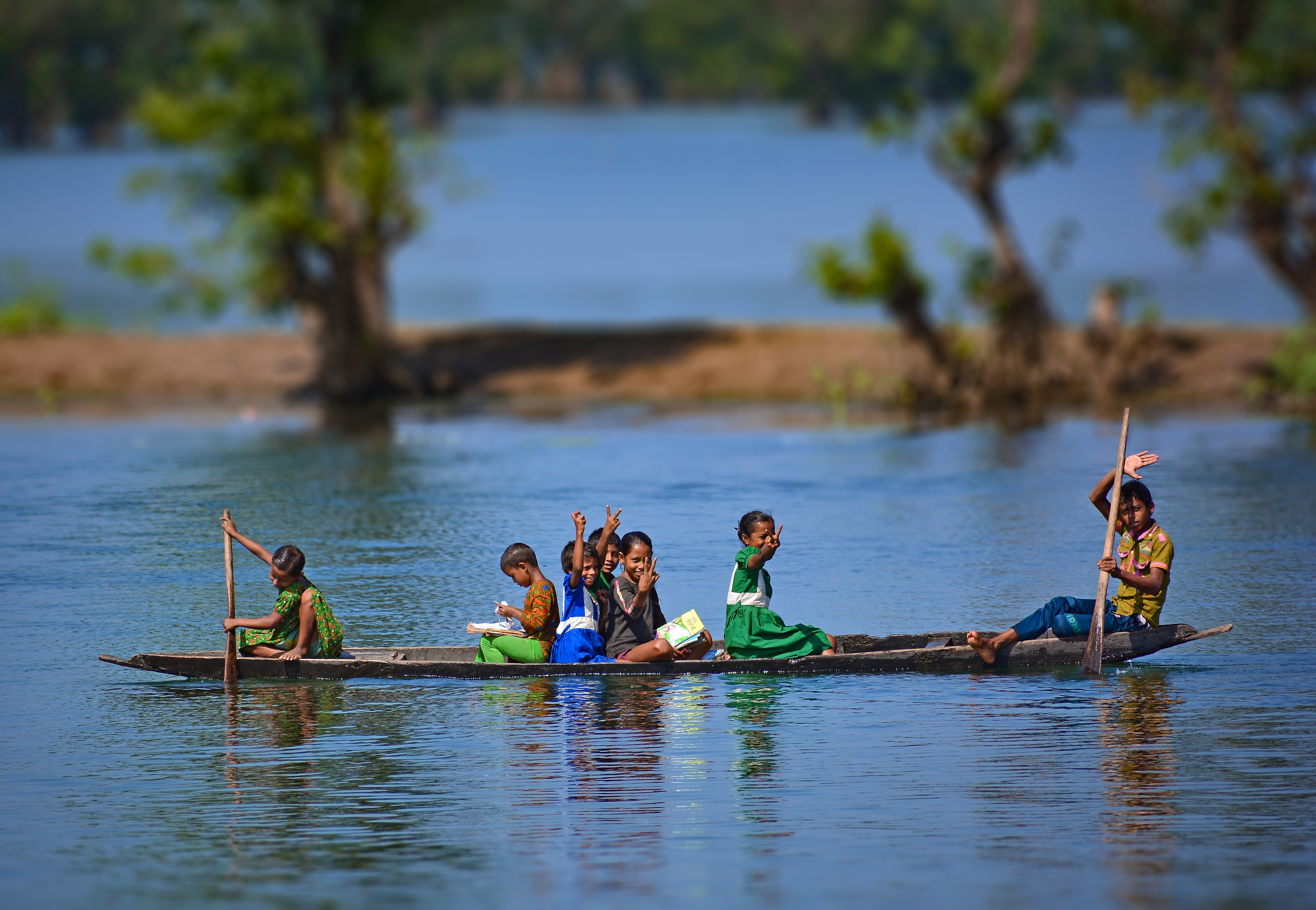
Children in a boat on the Shari-Goyain River in Ratargul Swamp Forest

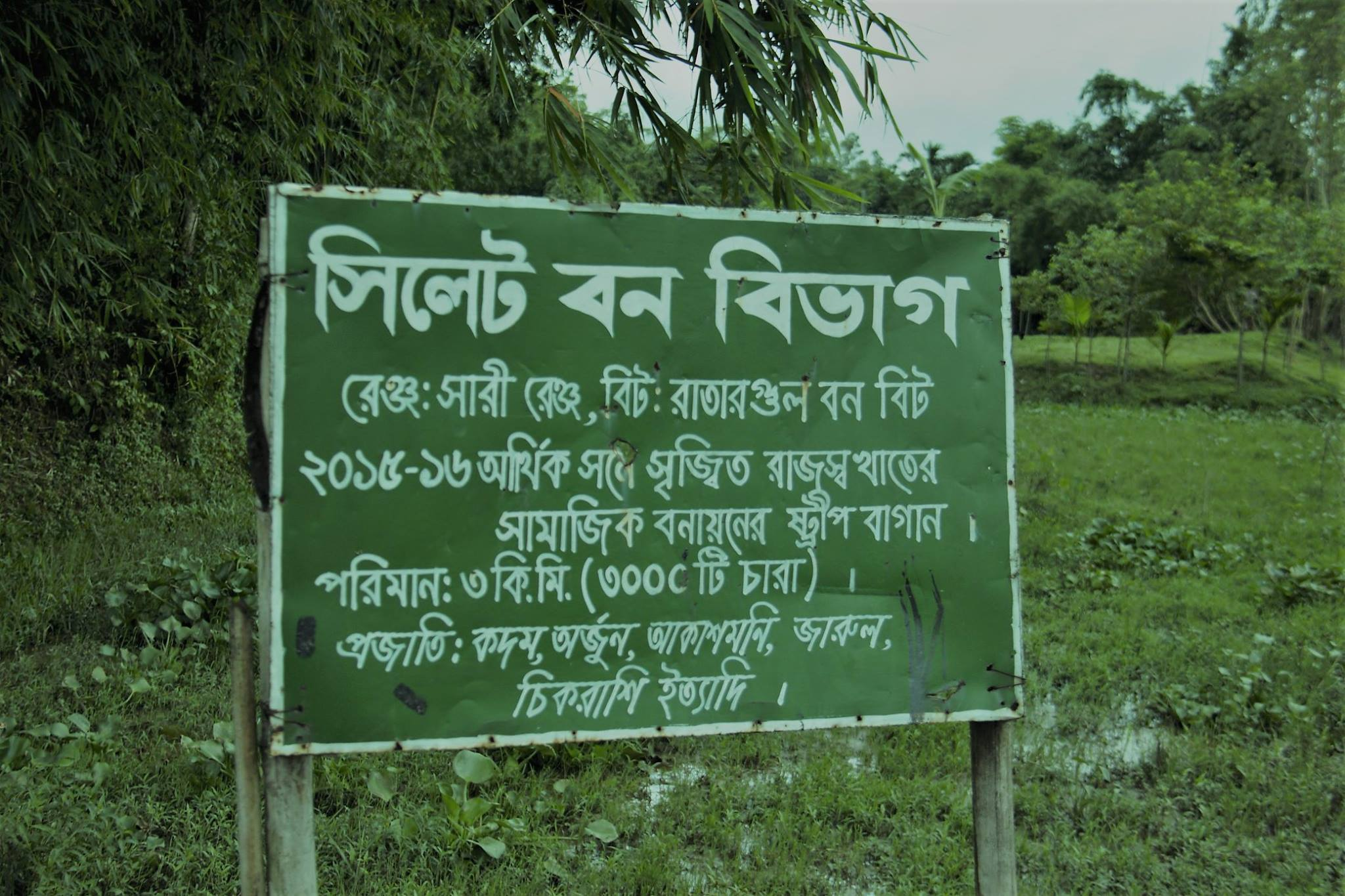

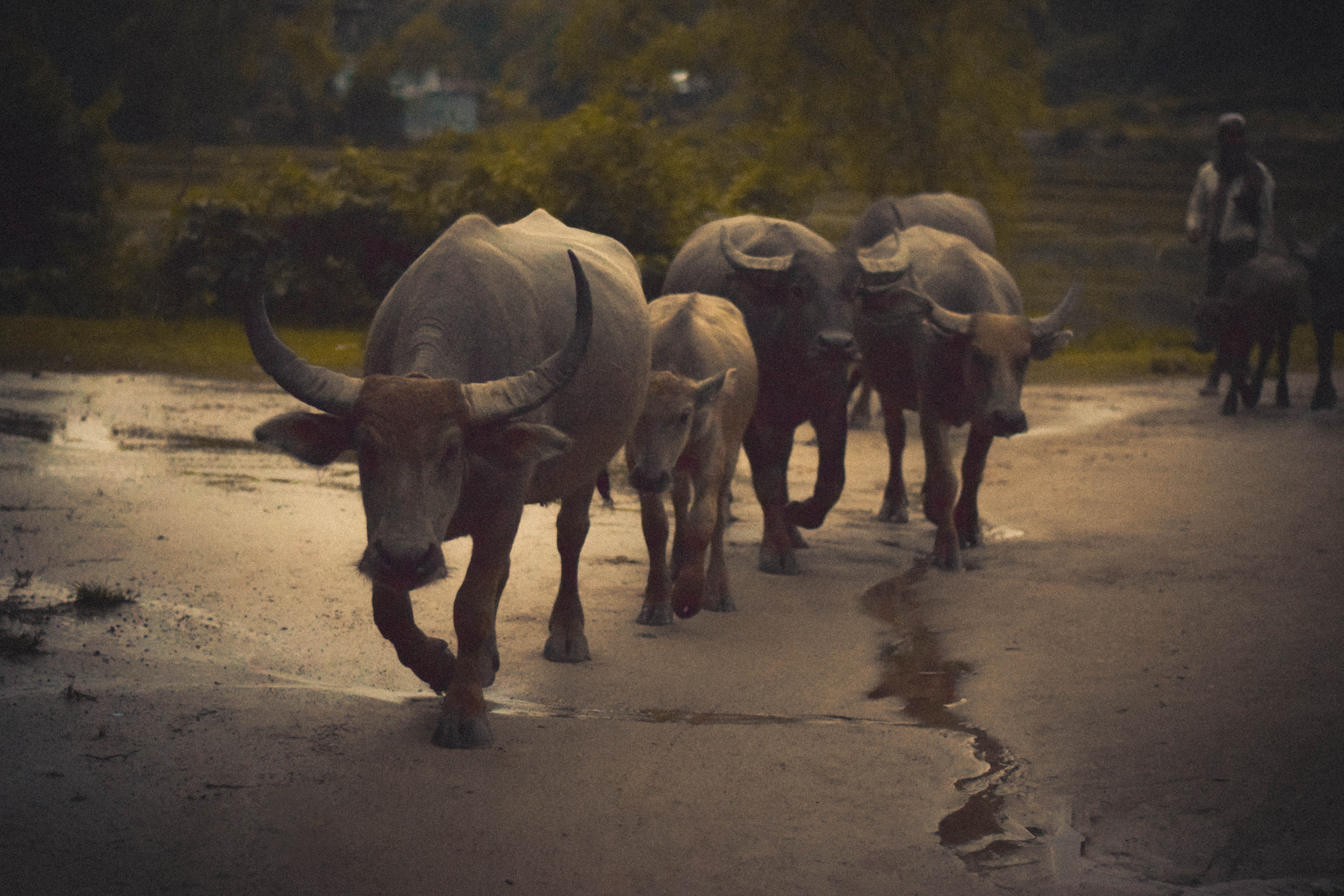

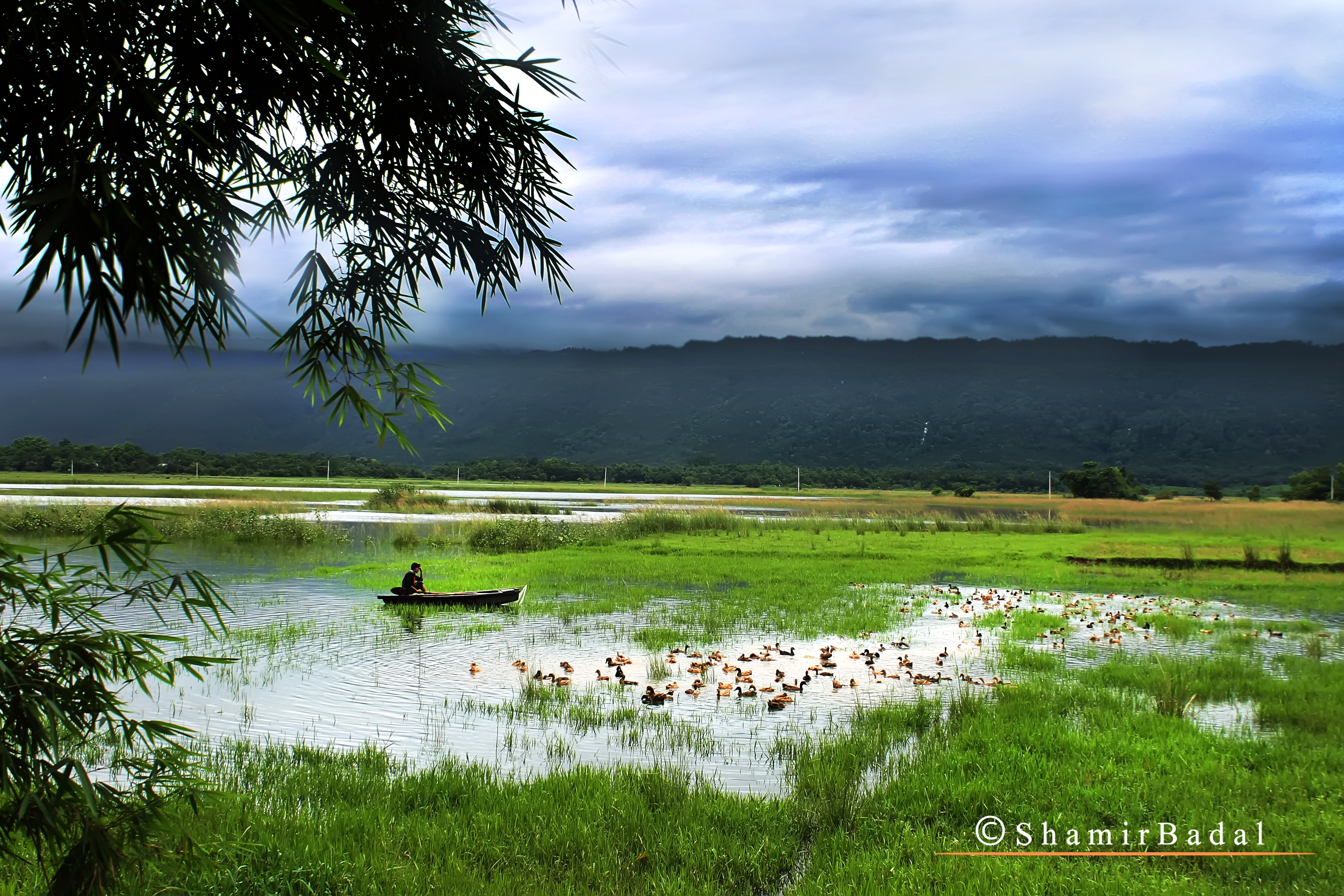

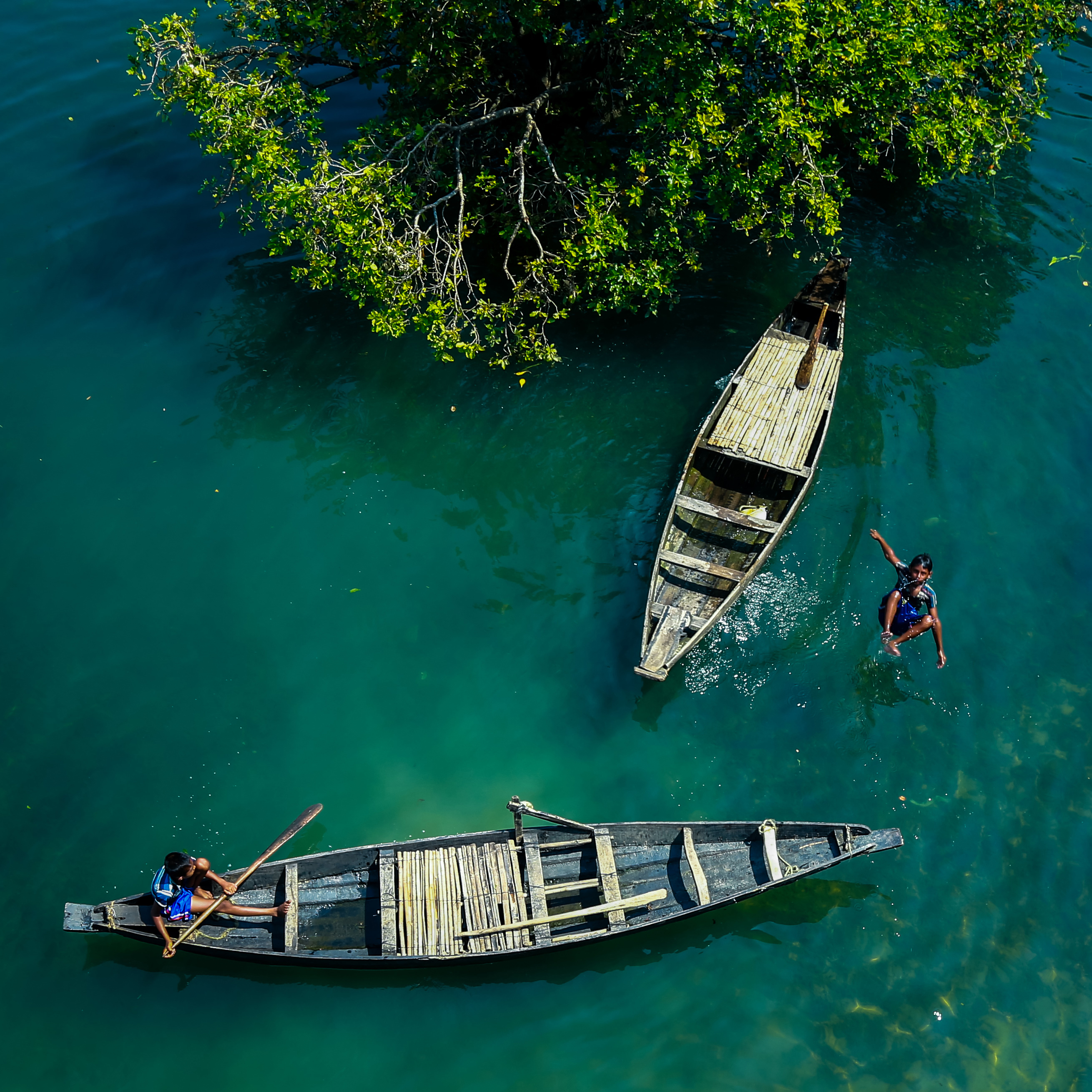

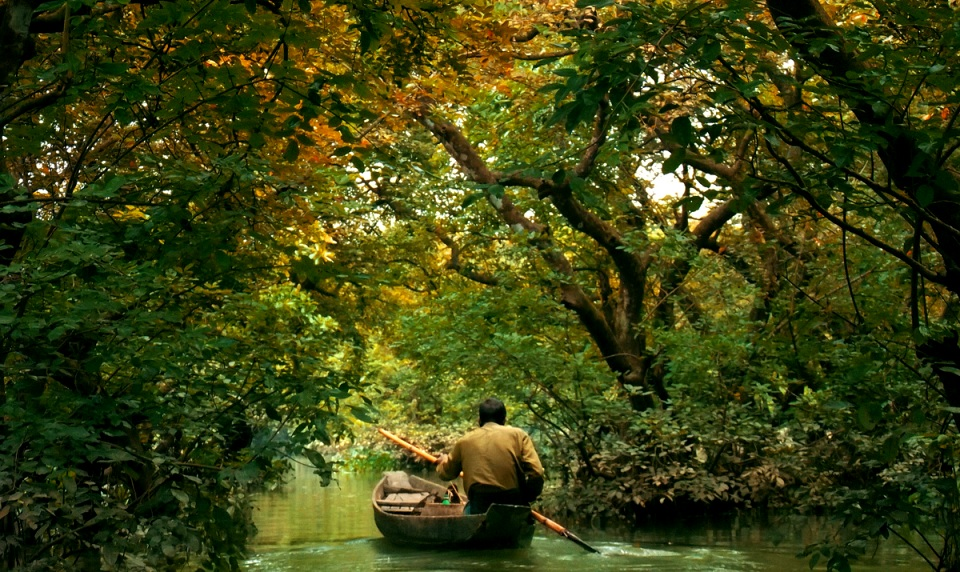

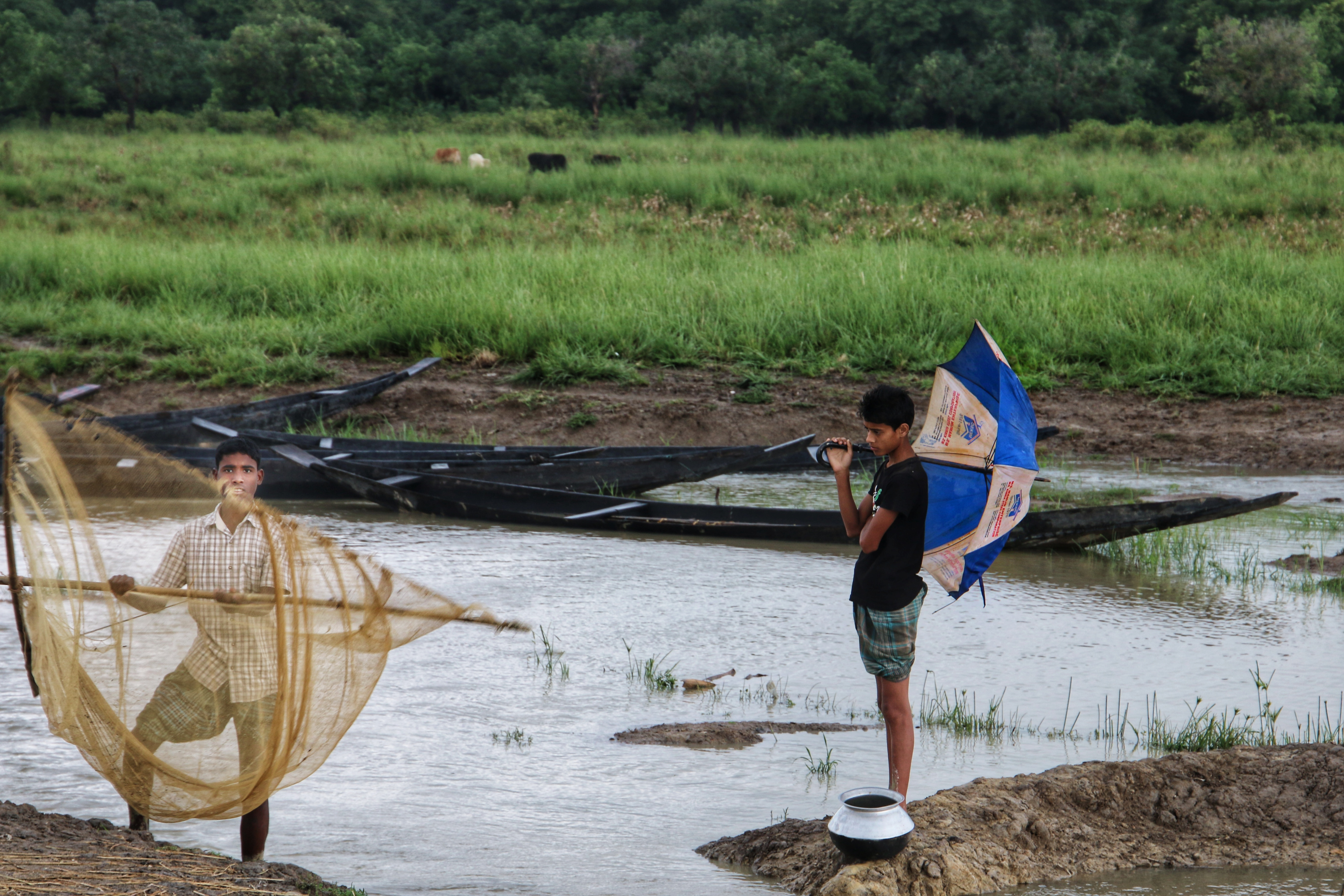

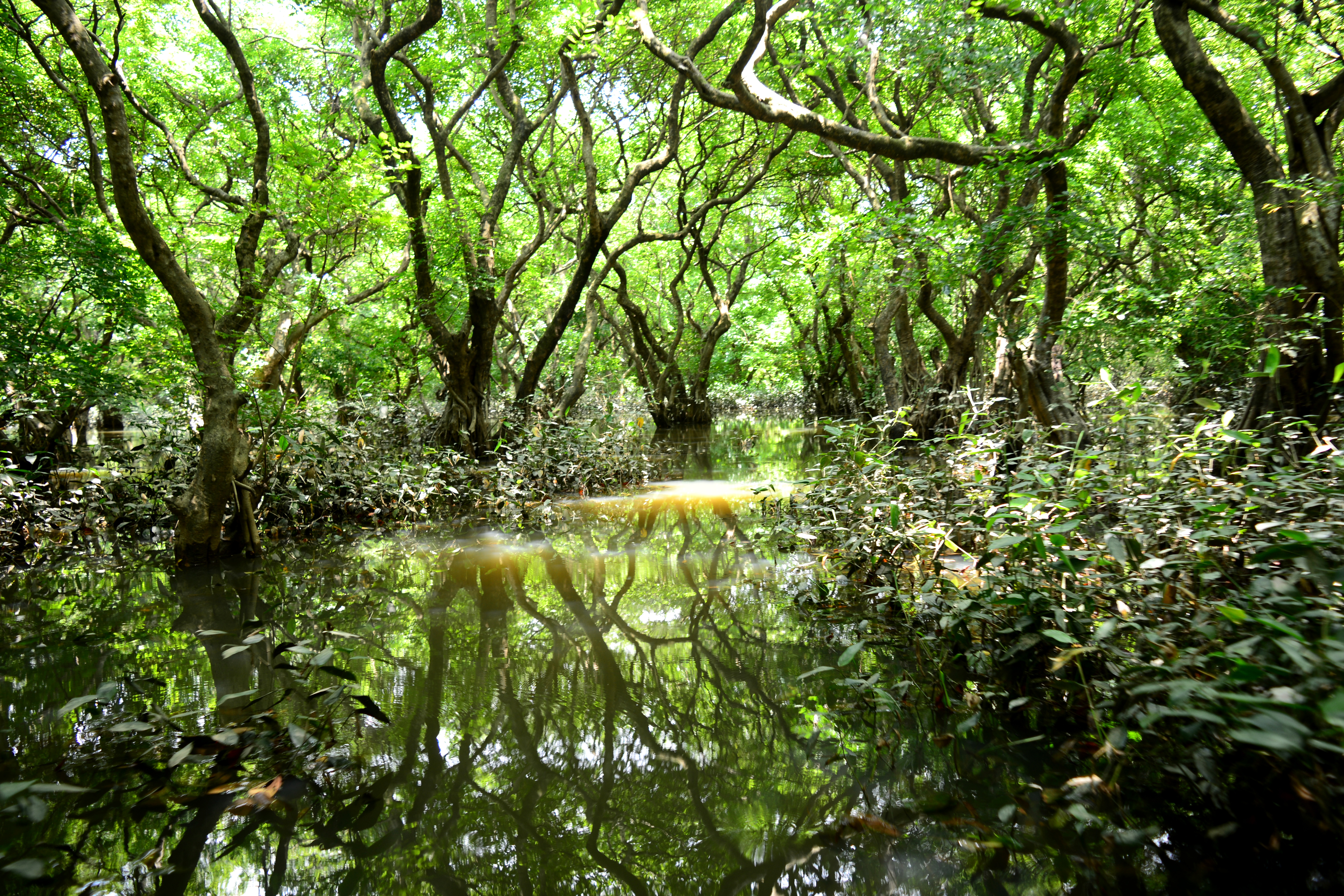

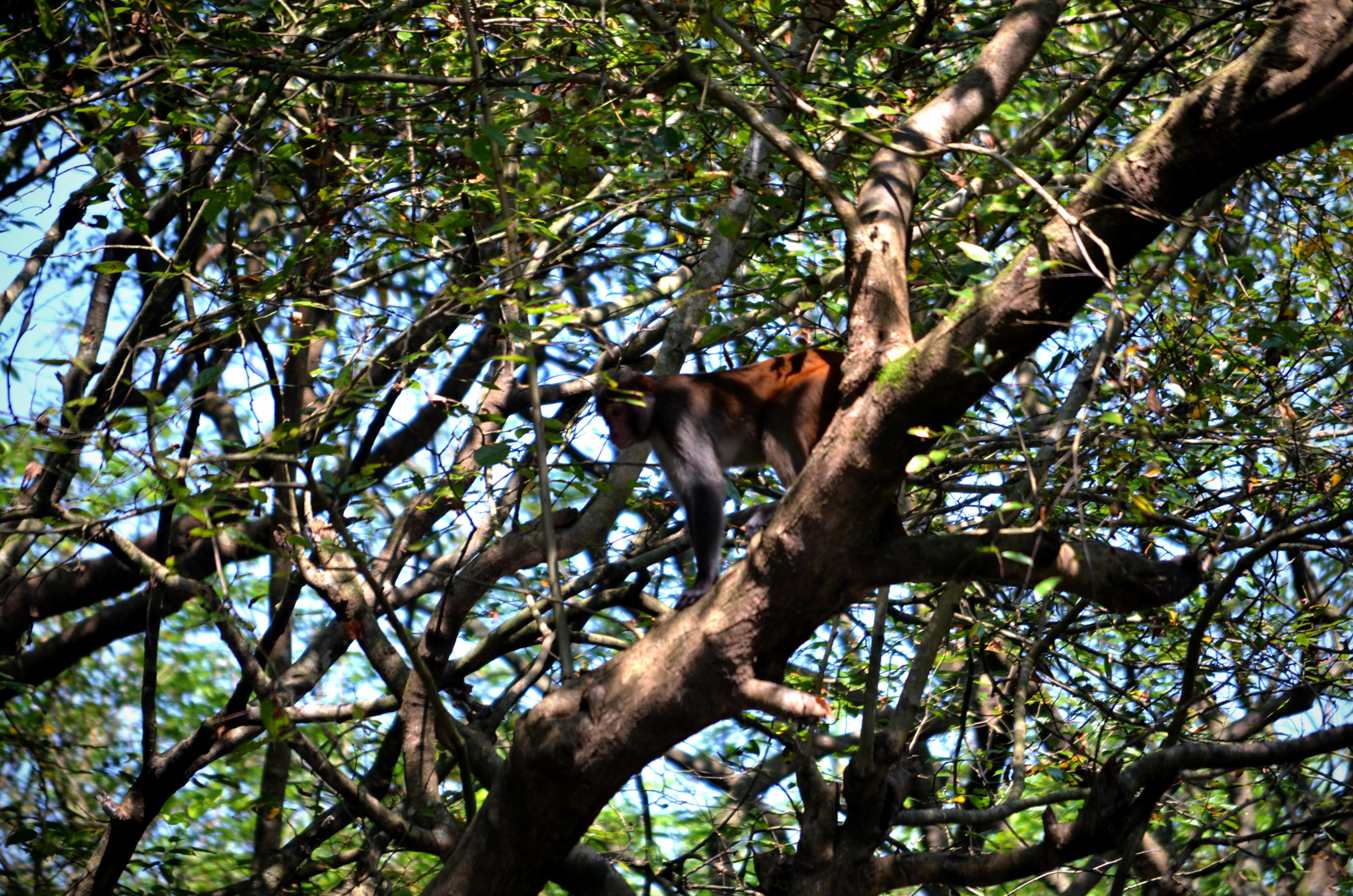

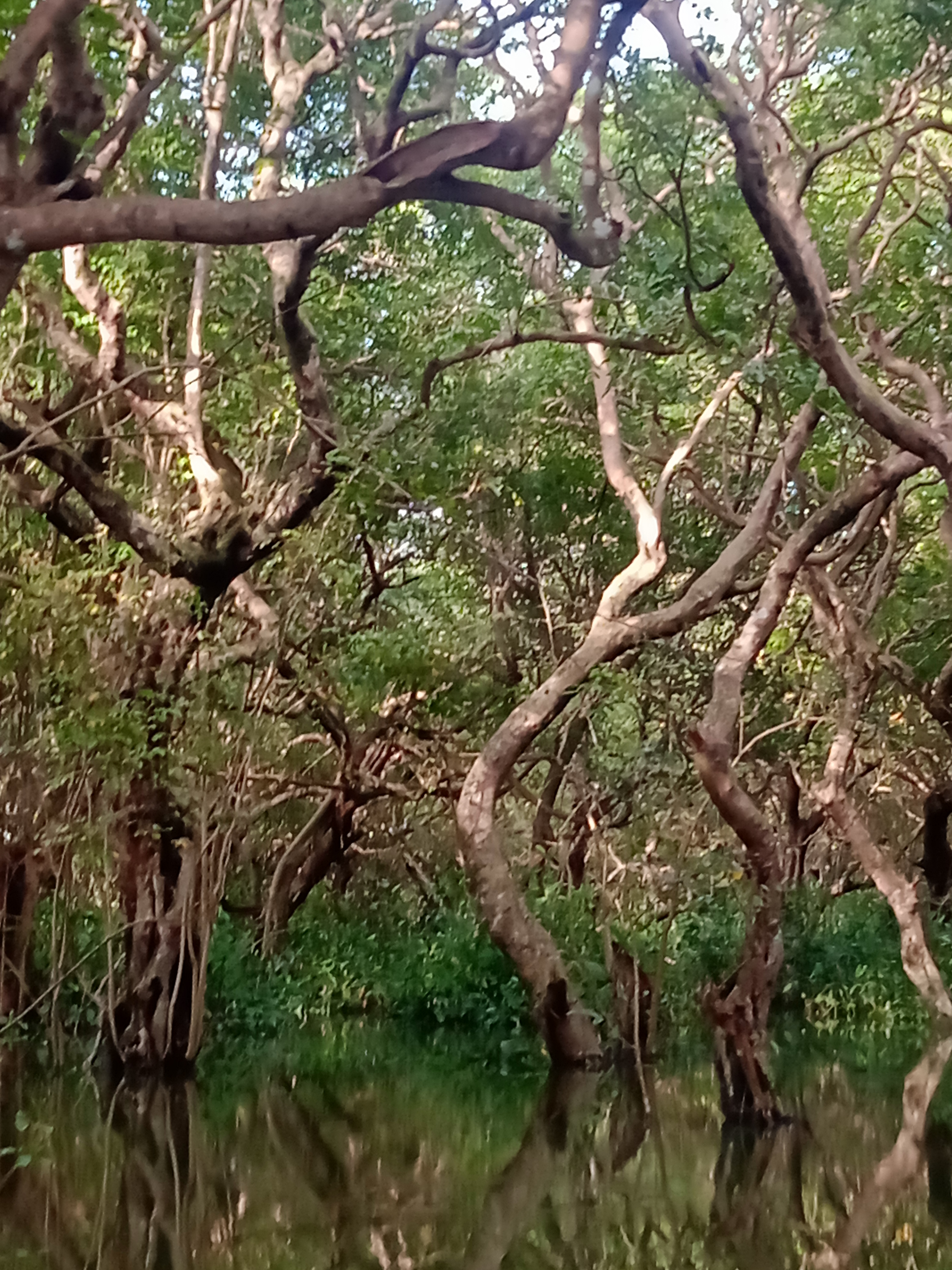

== See also ==
- Lalakhal
