= Royal Order of Sahametrei =

Cambodian chivalric order

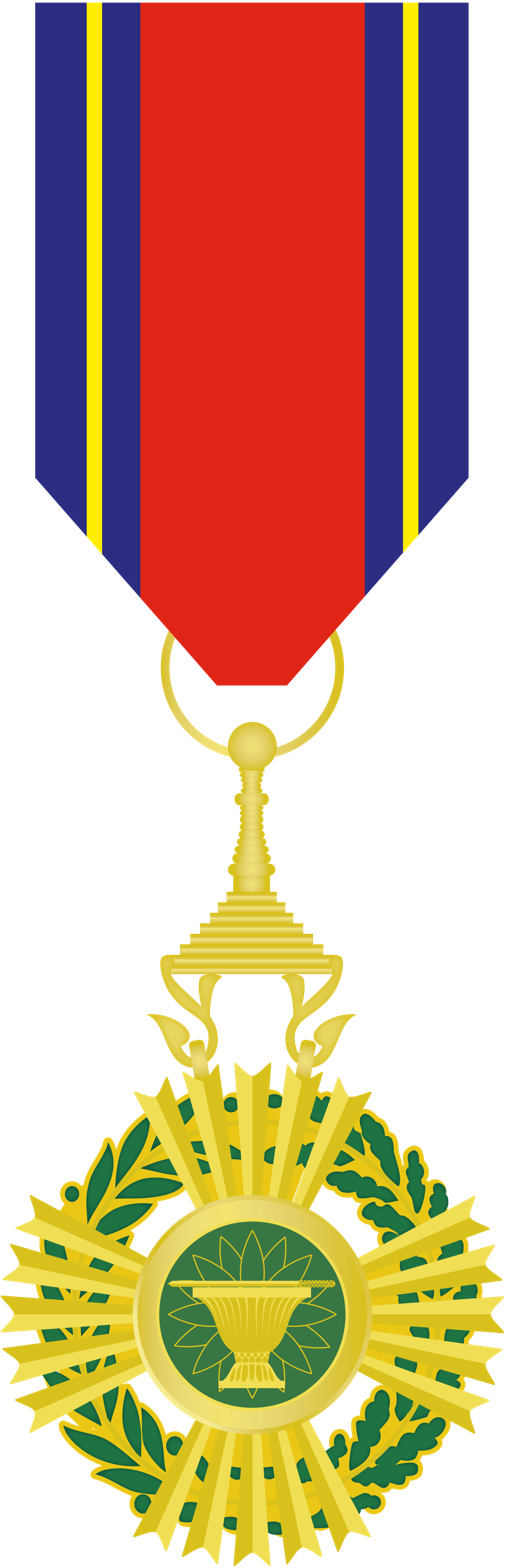
- Commander Class Medal of the order Knight Class Medal of the order

Awarded by Cambodia
- Type: Order
- Established: 9 September 1948; 77 years ago
- Awarded for: Distinguished services to the King and to the people of Cambodia
- Status: Currently awarded
- Grades: Grand Cross; Grand Officer; Commander; Officer; Knight
- Ribbon bar

The Royal Order of Sahametrei (Khmer: គ្រឿងឥស្សរិយយសលំដាប់សហមេត្រី, Krœăng Ĕssârĭyôyôs Lumdăb Sâhâmétrei) is a chivalric order conferred by the government of the Kingdom of Cambodia. The Royal Order of Sahametrei was instituted in three classes on 9 September 1948 and was expanded to five classes on 23 August 1956. The order was not used during the Khmer Rouge period and was reinstated on 5 October 1995 by Royal Decree No. 1095/01. It is conferred primarily on foreigners who have rendered distinguished services to the King and to the people of Cambodia, particularly in the field of external relations and diplomatic services or, as a token of friendship.

The Royal Order of Sahametrei is part of the Cambodia's honours system which currently includes the Royal Order of Monisaraphon, the Royal Order of Cambodia and the Royal Order of Sowathara. The Grand Cross and Grand Officer is presented as a sash worn over the right shoulder. The Commander class of the Royal Order of Sahametrei is a neck order and is suspended from a cravat that is worn around the neck. The badge of the Officer and Knight are worn on the left breast.

== History ==
The Royal Order of Sahametrei was established by King Norodom Sihanouk on September 9, 1948. It was instituted in three classes but expanded on August 23, 1956, to five classes:

1. Maha Sirivudha (មហាសេរីវឌ្ឍន៍) or Grand Cross
2. Mahasena (មហាសេនា) or Grand Officer
3. Tepidin (ធិបឌិន្ទ) or Commander
4. Sena (សេនា) or Officer
5. Askararidha (អស្សឫទ្ធិ) or Knight

The order became dormant in 1975 under the government of Democratic Kampuchea. It was reinstituted by Royal Decree No.1095/01 on 5 October 1995 by King Norodom Sihanouk.

== Recipients ==
Year appointed	Class	Name	Post-nominals
1956	Knight & Commander	J.M. Abdul Aziz, Koothanallur, India (Brother of Khan Saheb JM Mohamed Ismael)	
1973	Knight	Mr. Joseph A. Hazbun	
1974	Officer	Mr. Louis Mason	
1982	Commander	Mr. Colin pratt	
1998	Knight	Mr. Giuseppe Di Bella	
1998	Officer	Mr. Christophe Peschoux	
1998	Officer	Ms. Rut Hugo	
1998	Officer	Mr. Christophe Horvath	
1999	Grand Cross	Ali Alatas	
1999	Commander	Dr. Peter Schier	
1999		Masaharu Kono	
1999		Lakhan Mehrotra	
2000	Commander	Mr. Glenn Denning	
2000	Grand Officer	Mr. Benoît Duchâteau-Arminjon	
2001	Grand Cross Officer	Dr.Thaksin Shinawatra Mr Martin Peter Gillham	
2002	Grand Officer	Dr.Surakiart Sathirathai	
2002	Knight	Mr. Colin Poole	
2002	Knight	James McCabe	
2003	Commander	Dr. Haruhisa Handa	
2003		Dr. Gary Jacques	
2003	Officer	Dr. Graham J.Gumley	
2003	Knight	Mr. Nicolaas P. van Zalinge; Jorgen G. Jensen	
2003	Officer	Mr. Pierre Tami	
2004	Officer	Mr. Maamar Ferkoun	
2004	Officer	Mr. Ian Marshall	
2006		Mr. John McGeoghan	
2006		M. S. Swaminathan	
2006		Dr. Ronald Cantrell	
2006		Ms. Lisa Filipetto	
2006		Mr. Blair Exell	
2006		Ms. Fleur Davies	
2006		Rian Dixon	
2006		Dr. Peter Core	
2006		Ms. Shu Fukai	
2006		Dr. John Skerritt	
2006		Dr. Jung-Chaee Keng	
2006		Dr. Ja-Ock Guh	
2006	Knight	Dr. M. C. Nandeesha	
2007		Dr. Chris Barlow	
2007	Commander	Ong Keng Yong	
2008		Dr. Chinkholal Thangsing	
2008	Commander	Lt. Gen. Peter Leahy	
2008	Commander	Mr. Andrew J. Malanga	
2009	Commander	Mr. Kazuhiro Yoneda	
2009	Knight	Dr. Dirk Van Aken	
2010	Officer	Dr. Jenny Daltry	
2010	Commander	Mr. Fernand Desmyter	
2010	Officer	Mr. Lodewijk Van Schel	
2010		Mr. Steven Hyde	
2010		Mr. Freddy Wens	
2010		Mr. Jacques Dezeure	
2010		Mr. Robert Kee	
2011	Commander	Mr. Michael Kilburn	
2011	Grand Cross	Ms. Shi Dayuan	
2011	Grand Officer	Ms. Lin Hua	
2011	Officer	Mr. Karl Gerner	
2011	Grand Cross	Mr. Anthony Lisle	
2011	Knight	Ms. Lu Wang	
2012	Commander	Pyone Maung Maung	
2012	Grand Officer	Mr. Anthony Lisle	
2012	Commander	Mr. Domenic Friguglietti	
2013	Grand Cross	Mr. Steve Penfold	
2013	Commander	Ms. Usha Mishra	
2013	Commander	Ms. Megan Anderson	
2013	Commander	Mr. Freddy Wens	
2013	Officer	Mr. Janne Ritskes	
2013	Knight	Mr. Allen Dodgson Tan	
2013	Knight	Mr. Tony Langer	
2013	Knight	Mr. Robert Rice	
2013	Knight	Mr. Gerard Leenen	
2013	Knight	Ms. Megan McCoy	
2013	Knight	Mr. Leon Len Austin	
2013	Officer	Mr. Jan Erik Støa	
2013	Officer	Mr. Mike James	
2014	Grand Officer	Mr. Preet Bharara	
2014	Grand Officer	Ms. Sharon Cohen Levin	
2014	Grand Officer	Mr. William E. Todd	
2014	Grand Officer	Datuk Leong Yeng Kit	
2014	Grand Officer	Ms. Christina Cronsioe	
2014	Commander	Lt. Colonel Kristen Means	
2014	Commander	Mr. Alexander Wilson	
2014	Commander	Ir. Mohd Nizam Bin Mohd Nawi	
2014	Commander	Ms. Sarah Paul	
2014	Commander	Ms. Christine Magdo	
2014	Commander	Ms. Sarah Krissoff	
2014	Commander	Mr. Eric Bourdonneau	
2014	Commander	Mr. Allen Dodgson Tan	
2014	Commander	Mr. Leon Len Austin	
2014	Commander	Ms. Emma Atkinson	
2014	Commander	Mr. Stanley Brown	
2014	Commander	Ms. Julie Chung	
2014	Commander	Golden West Humanitarian Foundation	
2014	Commander	Mr. Roger Ray Hess	
2014	Commander	Ms. Andrea Acerbis	
2014	Commander	Ms. Shashi Dharan	
2014	Officer	Mr. Daniel Brazier	
2014	Officer	Mr. Nicholas Wolf	
2014	Officer	Mr. Tokyo Bak	
2014	Officer	Mr. Brenton Easter	
2014	Officer	Fong Tchan	
2014	Officer	Ms. Christina LoPresti	
2014	Officer	Mr. Thomas Wotka	
2014	Officer	Mr. Robert Rice	
2014	Officer	Mr. Marcel Durocher	
2014	Officer	Mr. Alistair Moir	
2014	Officer	Mr. Allan Vosburgh	
2014	Officer	Mr. Michael L. Trocino	
Officer	Mr. Nicholas Street		
2015	Grand Cross	Ms. Azedine Beschaouch	
2015	Grand Officer	Mr. Russell Schmieder	
2015	Grand Officer	Mr. Harry Wormald	
2015	Commander	Mr. Michael Chippendale	
2015	Commander	Mr. Jonathan D. Green	
2015	Commander	Ms. Maamar FERKOUN	
2015	Commander	Mr. Paul Jonathan Freer	
2015	Commander	Mr. Barry Sutherland	
2015	Commander	Dr. Laura Watson	
2015	Commander	Mr. Daniel Friendly	
2015	Commander	Mr. Michael Hodgson	
2015	Officer	Mr. Lloyd Ngoh	
2015	Officer	Mr. Alexander C. Arcinas	
2015	Officer	Mr. William T. Grau	
2015	Officer	Ms. Elisia Correa	
2015	Officer	Mr. Michael Nisi	
2016	Grand Officer	Mr. Denis Schrey	
2016	Commander	Dr. Daniel Heilmann	
2016	Commander	Mr. John D. Rennie	
2016	Grand Cross	Mr. Scott Neeson	
2016	Grand Cross	Mr. James McCabe	
2016	Grand Cross	Mr. Alan Lemon	
2016	Officer	Mr. Patrick Ramsing	
2017	Officer	Mr. Hervé Dallerac	
2017	Grand Cross	Ambassador Hidehisa Horinouchi	
2017	Grand Officer	Mr. Allen Dodgson Tan	
2017	Commander	Mr. Nicholas Guest	
2017	Commander	Mr. Aksel Steen-Nilsen	
2017	Officer	Dr. Dirk Van Aken	
2017	Knight	Dr. Lutgardo C. Punzalan	
2017	Commander	Dr. Leul Ayalew MEKONNEN	
2018	Grand Cross	Dato' Sri Kee Yong Wee	
2018	Grand Cross	Ms. Datin Sri Mah Ming Yuet	
2018	Grand Cross	Ms. Samiuela Tulikifanga Tukuafu	
2018	Grand Cross	Lt. General Suhartono	
2018	Grand Officer	Mr. Jasper Martijn Paas	
2018	Officer	Mr. Edwin Faigmane	
2018	Commander	Mr. Don Brewster	
2018	Commander	Mr. Martin Reeve	
2018	Commander	Ms. Etta Suhartono	
2018	Commander	Mr. Eric Meldrum	
2019	Grand Cross	Mr. Arnaud Laillou	
2019	Grand Cross	Mr. Ted Sussman	
2019	Commander	Detective Chief Inspector John Geden (Hampshire Police & CEOP)	
2019	Grand Cross	Msgr. Olivier Schmitthaeusler	
2019	Grand Cross	Major General Hoàng Thế Thiện	
2020	Grand Cross	Dr. Mile Glamcevski	
2020	Commander	Mr. Nigel Lee Lecturer in Criminology	
2020	Grand Officer	Mr. Michael Tan, former Ambassador of Singapore	
2020	Grand Cross	Mr. Andrew Lin	
2020	Officer	COL Edmund Tan Chong Kuang	
2022	Commander	Mr. Volkan Ozturk	
2022	Grand Officer	Dr. Turobova Tatiana	
2022	Grand Officer	Dr. Shevaldin Anatoly	
2023	Grand Cross	Gen. Dudung Abdurachman	
2023	Grand Cross	Pr. Thomas Vallée	
2023	Grand Officer	Mr. Romain Santon	
2023	Grand Officer	Ms. Ashley Frederes	
2023	Grand Officer	Ms. Lynn Sferrazza	
2024	Grand Cross	Liurka Rodríguez Barrios	
2024	Grand Cross	Col. Moch. Rizal	
2025	Grand Cross	Gen. Muhammad Hafizuddeain Jantan	
2025	Grand Cross	Gen. Mohd Nizam Jaffar	
2026	Commander	Mr. Gerhard Jan Lennips	

== See also ==
- Cambodian honours system
- Royal Order of Monisaraphon
