= Masaharu =

- Gender: Male

Origin
- Origin: Japanese
- Meaning: Different meanings depending on the kanji used

Masaharu (written: 雅治, 雅晴, 雅春, 正治, 正晴, 正春, 匡治, 政治, 政晴, 誠春 or 昌晴) is a masculine Japanese given name. Notable people with the name include:

- Masaharu Anesaki (姉崎 正治; 1873–1949), Japanese writer
- Masaharu Fukuyama (福山 雅治; born 1969), Japanese singer-songwriter, musician and actor
- Masaharu Homma (本間 雅晴; 1887–1946), Japanese general
- Masaharu Ikuta (生田 正治; born 1935), Japanese businessman
- Inoue Masaharu (井上 正春; 1805–1847), Japanese daimyō
- Masaharu Iwata (岩田 匡治; born 1966), Japanese video game composer
- Masaharu Kondo (born 1956), Japanese bureaucrat
- Masaharu Kono (河野 雅治), Japanese diplomat
- Masaharu Matsushita (松下 正治; c. 1913 – 2012), Japanese businessman
- Masaharu Morimoto (森本 正治; born 1955), Japanese chef
- Masaharu Nagashima (長島 正治; 1929–2010), Japanese dermatologist
- Masaharu Nakagawa (House of Councillors) (中川 雅治; born 1947), Japanese politician
- Masaharu Nakagawa (House of Representatives) (中川 正春; born 1950), Japanese politician
- Masaharu Nishi (西 政治; born 1977), Japanese footballer
- Masaharu Satō (佐藤 正治; born 1946), Japanese voice actor
- Masaharu Suzuki (鈴木 正治; born 1970), Japanese footballer
- Masaharu Taguchi (田口 正治; 1916–1982), Japanese swimmer
- Masaharu Taniguchi (谷口 雅春; 1893–1985), Japanese philosopher
- Masaharu Ueda (上田 正治; born 1938), Japanese cinematographer
- Wachi Masaharu (和智 誠春; died 1568), Japanese samurai
- Masaharu Yamada (山田 政晴; born 1980), Japanese weightlifter
- Masaharu Yamazaki (山崎 正晴; born 1968), Japanese cross-country skier
- Yonekura Masaharu (米倉 昌晴; 1728–1786), Japanese daimyō

== See also ==
- 5850 Masaharu, a main-belt asteroid
