= Paraechinorhynchus =

Scientific classification
- Kingdom: Animalia
- Phylum: Acanthocephala
- Class: Eoacanthocephala
- Order: Neoechinorhynchida
- Family: Neoechinorhynchidae
- Genus: Paraechinorhynchus; Bilqees and Khan, 1983
- Species: P. kalriai

Binomial name
- Paraechinorhynchus kalriai Bilqees and Khan, 1983

Genus of parasitic worms

Paraechinorhynchus is a monotypic genus of acanthocephalans (thorny-headed or spiny-headed parasitic worms) containing a single species, Paraechinorhynchus kalriai, that infests the rohu.

== Taxonomy ==
The species was described by Bilqees and Khan, 1983. The National Center for Biotechnology Information does not indicate that any phylogenetic analysis has been published on Paraechinorhynchus that would confirm its position as a unique order in the family Neoechinorhynchidae.

== Description ==
P. kalriai consists of a proboscis covered in 18 hooks in 3 spiral rows of 4, 6 and 8 hooks respectively, a proboscis receptacle, and a trunk.

== Distribution ==
The distribution of P. kalriai is determined by that of its hosts. It was found in Kalri Lake, Sind, Pakistan.

== Hosts ==
Life cycle of Acanthocephala. (Note: There are no known aberrant human infections for P. kalriai species.)

The life cycle of an acanthocephalan consists of three stages beginning when an infective acanthor (development of an egg) is released from the intestines of the definitive host and then ingested by an arthropod, the intermediate host. Although the intermediate hosts of Paraechinorhynchus are ???. When the acanthor molts, the second stage called the acanthella begins. This stage involves penetrating the wall of the mesenteron or the intestine of the intermediate host and growing. The final stage is the infective cystacanth which is the larval or juvenile state of an Acanthocephalan, differing from the adult only in size and stage of sexual development. The cystacanths within the intermediate hosts are consumed by the definitive host, usually attaching to the walls of the intestines, and as adults they reproduce sexually in the intestines. The acanthor are passed in the feces of the definitive host and the cycle repeats. There may be paratenic hosts (hosts where parasites infest but do not undergo larval development or sexual reproduction) for Paraechinorhynchus.

P. kalriai parasitizes the rohu (Labeo rohita). There are no reported cases of P. kalriai infesting humans in the English language medical literature.

Hosts for Paraechinorhynchus kalriai

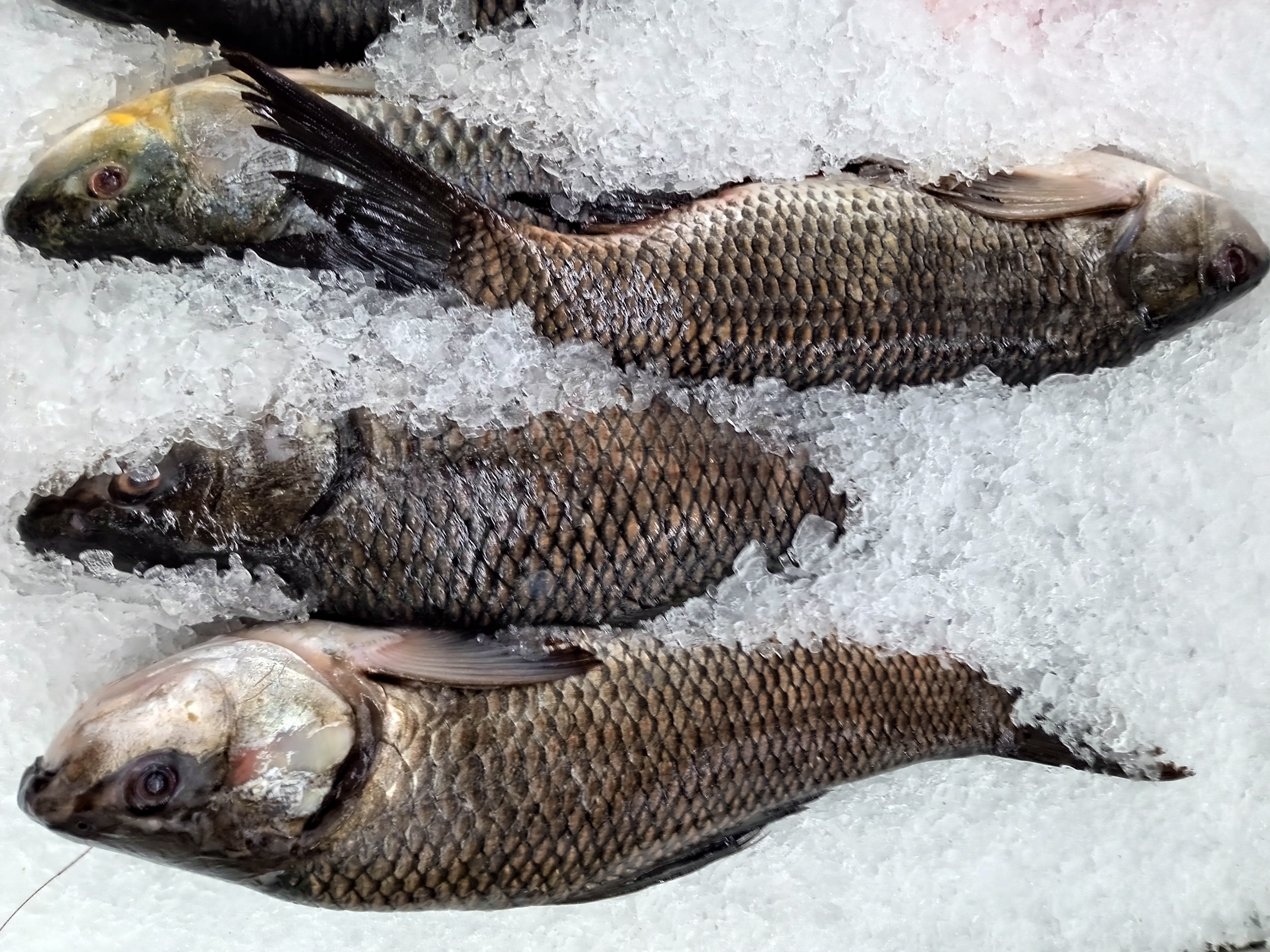
The rohu is a host for P. kalriai.
