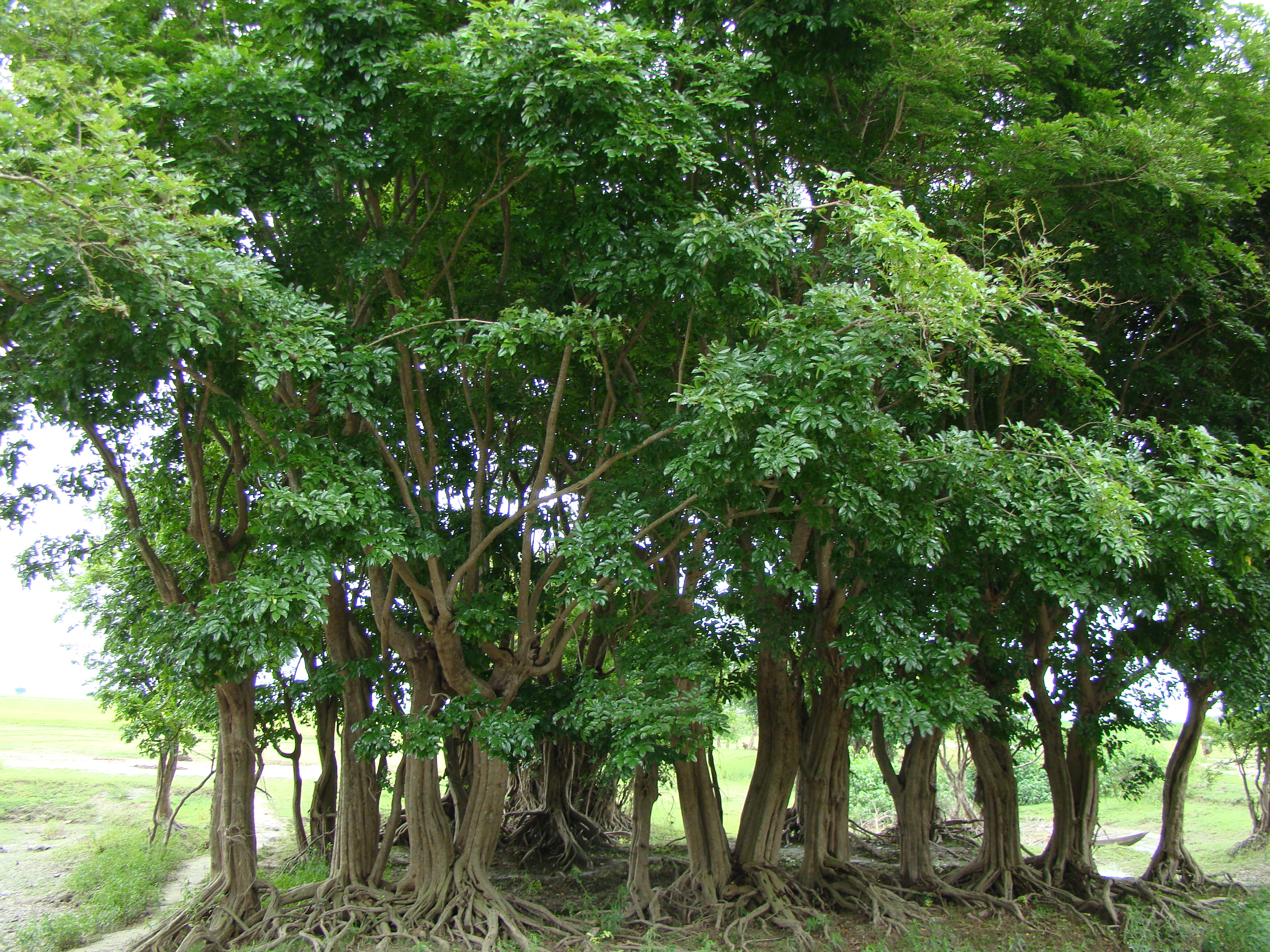
- In Bangladesh

Conservation status
- Least Concern (IUCN 3.1)

Scientific classification
- Kingdom: Plantae
- Clade: Tracheophytes
- Clade: Angiosperms
- Clade: Eudicots
- Clade: Rosids
- Order: Fabales
- Family: Fabaceae
- Subfamily: Faboideae
- Genus: Dalbergia
- Species: D. reniformis

Binomial name
- Dalbergia reniformis Roxb.

= Dalbergia reniformis =

Species of legume

Dalbergia reniformis is a wetland-dependent tree native to Bangladesh, India and Myanmar. It is a species of legume in the family Fabaceae.

In Bangladesh, it is found Haor wetland of the Sylhet Division. It is locally known as Karoch in Sunamganj, Sylhet area of Bangladesh. It is a small tree. The branches brown-silky and the leaves are compound, imparipinnate, alternate; leaflets 7-11, ca. 15-27 x 4-5 cm long, ovate, rounded at base, acute at apex, coriaceous, glabrescent. The flowers in axillary panicles, dense, silky; calyx ca. 30 cm long, white, standard obovate; stamens in two bundles. The fruit is Pod, ca. 2.5-3 x 0.6 - 0.7 cm, glabrous, fleshy when ripe, joints reniform.

The tree has strong adaption capacities to survive in water for up to six months or more. Serving as windbreaker and protect soil erosion at the Haor area of Bangladesh during the rainy season. It is the dominant tree in Ratargul freshwater flooded forest in Bangladesh.
