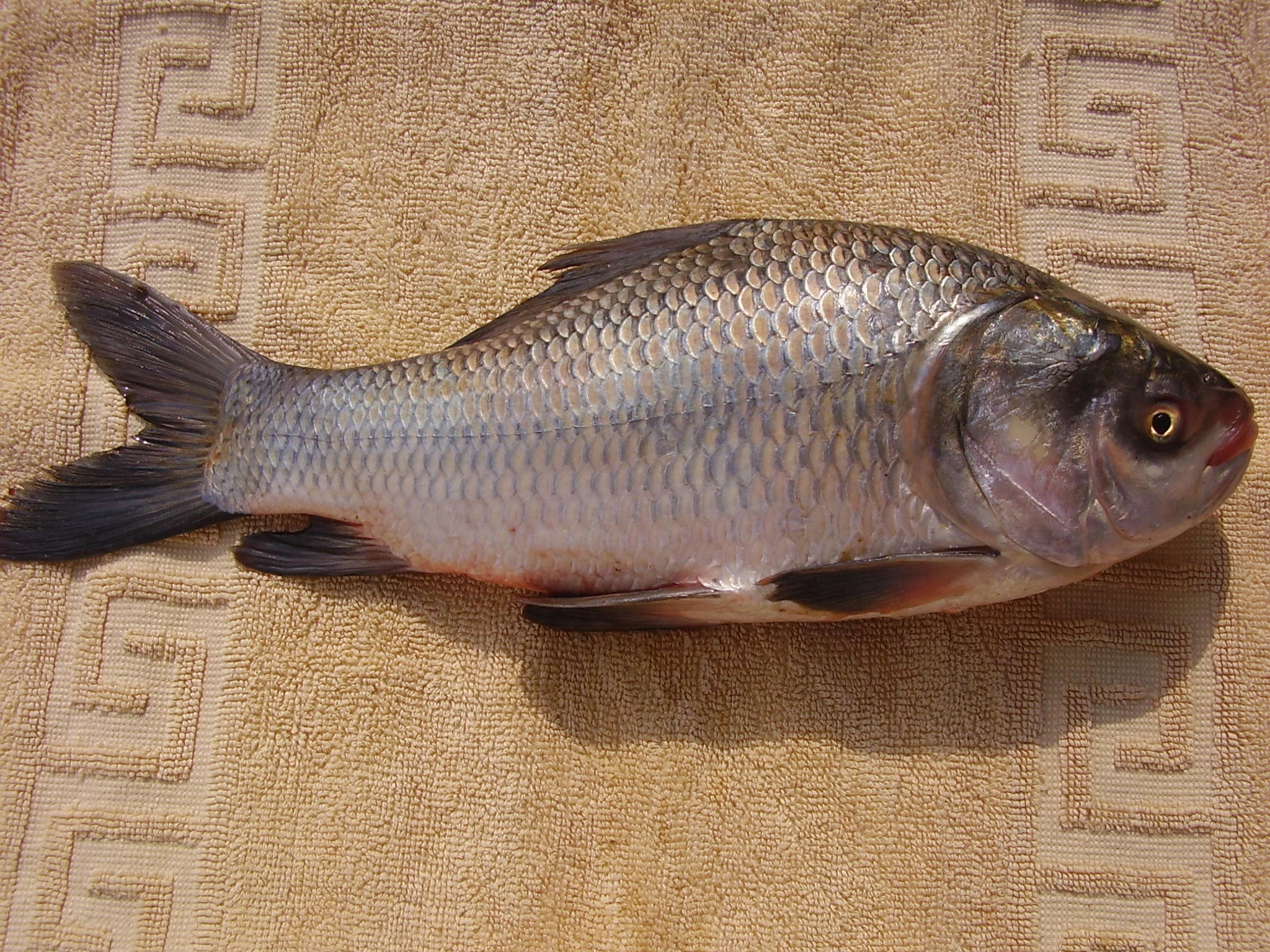
- Young catla

Conservation status
- Least Concern (IUCN 3.1)

Scientific classification
- Kingdom: Animalia
- Phylum: Chordata
- Class: Actinopterygii
- Order: Cypriniformes
- Family: Cyprinidae
- Subfamily: Labeoninae
- Genus: Labeo
- Species: L. catla

Binomial name
- Labeo catla (F. Hamilton, 1822)

Synonyms
- Cyprinus catla Hamilton, 1822; Catla catla (Hamilton, 1822); Leuciscus catla (Hamilton, 1822); Cyprinus abramioides Sykes, 1839; Hypselobarbus abramioides (Sykes, 1839); Catla buchanani Valenciennes, 1844; Gibelion catla (Hamilton 1822)

= Catla =

Species of fish

Catla (Labeo catla; Bengali: কাতলা, romanized: kātlā) also known as the major South Asian carp, is an economically important South Asian freshwater fish in the carp family Cyprinidae. It is native to rivers and lakes in northern India, Bangladesh, Myanmar, Nepal, and Pakistan, but has also been introduced elsewhere in South Asia and is commonly farmed.

In Nepal and neighbouring regions of India, up to Odisha, it is called bhakura.

Catla is a fish with large and broad head, a large protruding lower jaw, and upturned mouth. It has large, greyish scales on its dorsal side with a whitish belly. It reaches up to 182 cm (6.0 ft) in length and 38.6 kg (85 lb) in weight.

Catla is a surface and midwater feeder. Adults feed on zooplankton using large gill rakers, while young ones feed on both zooplankton and phytoplankton. Catla attains sexual maturity at an average age of two years and an average weight of 2 kg (4.4 lb).

== Taxonomy ==
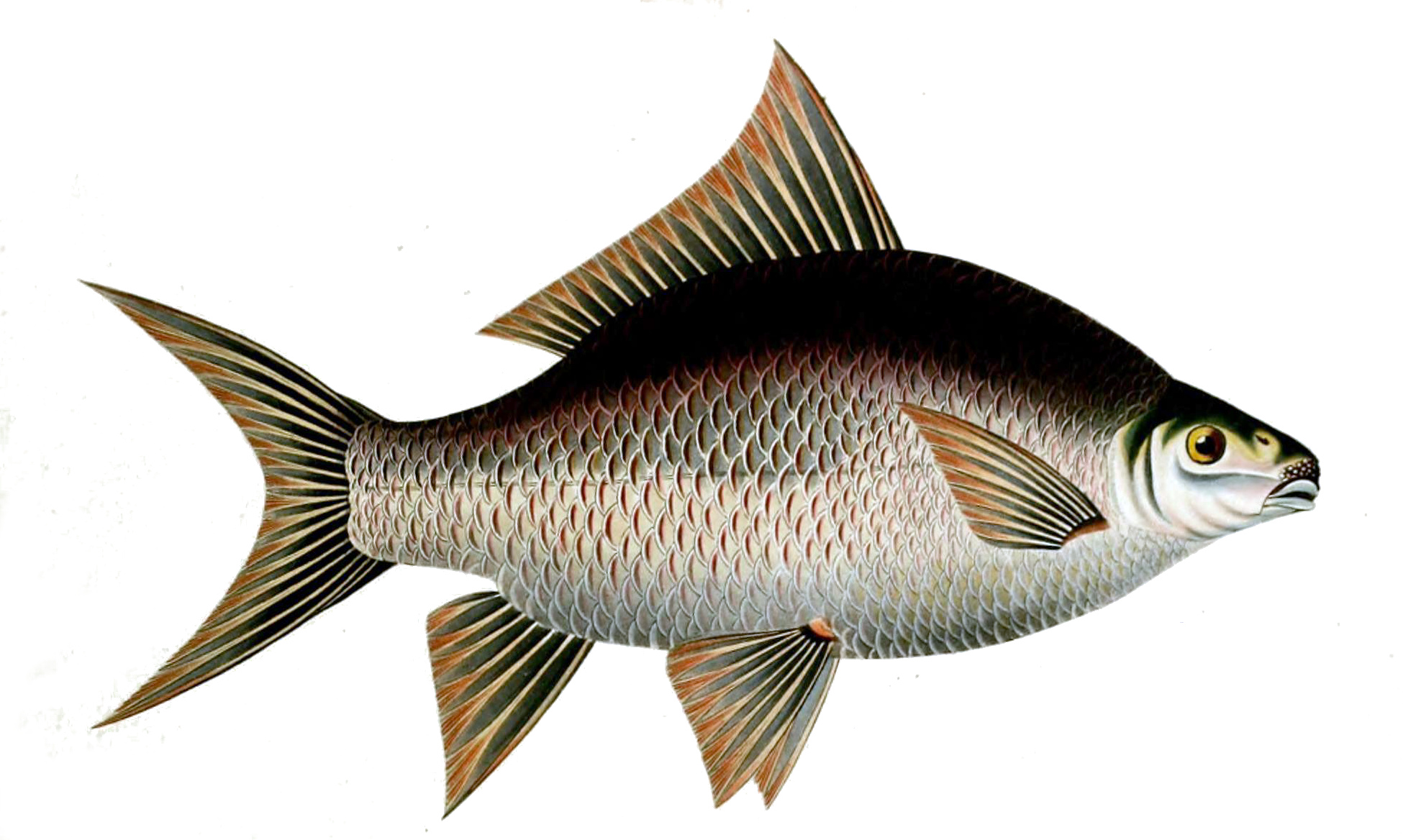

The catla was formerly listed as the only species in the genus Catla, but this was a synonym of the genus Gibelion. More recently, Catalog of Fishes has moved this species to Labeo. This species has often been confused with the giant barb (Catlocarpio siamensis) of south-east Asia as the two taxa bear an extraordinary resemblance to each other, especially in their very large heads.

== Aquaculture ==
Global aquaculture production of Catla (Gibelion catla) in million tonnes from 1950 to 2022, as reported by the FAO

The catla is one of the most important aquacultured freshwater species in South Asia. It is grown in polyculture ponds with other carp-like fish, particularly with the roho labeo (Labeo rohita) and mrigal carp. The reported production numbers have increased sharply during the 2000s, and were in 2012 about 2.8 million tonnes per year.

Catla is sold and consumed fresh, locally and regionally. It is transported on ice. Fish of 1–2 kg (2.2–4.4 lb) weight are preferred by consumers.

The Catla fish (also known as Indian carp in Vietnam) was first successfully artificially bred in Vietnam in 1986. This research was conducted by Mr. Trịnh Quốc Khánh, a Bachelor of Biology and former Deputy Director of the Mekong Delta Aquaculture Research Center under the Research Institute for Aquaculture No. 2 (Ministry of Fisheries). He was the primary person responsible for this study. Thanks to the artificial fertilization method and the efforts of Vietnamese researchers, this study was successfully implemented.
