= Masaharu Kono =

Japanese diplomat

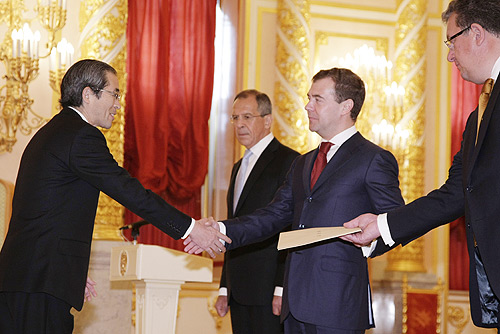
Kono presenting his credentials to Dmitry Medvedev in May 2009.

Masaharu Kono (Japanese: 河野雅治 b. 1948) is a former Japanese career diplomat. He served as the ambassador of Japan to Russia, Italy, Albania, Malta, and San Marino. He presented his credentials to Russian president Dmitry Medvedev on 29 May 2009. In March 2011, was relieved of his position as ambassador to Russia.
