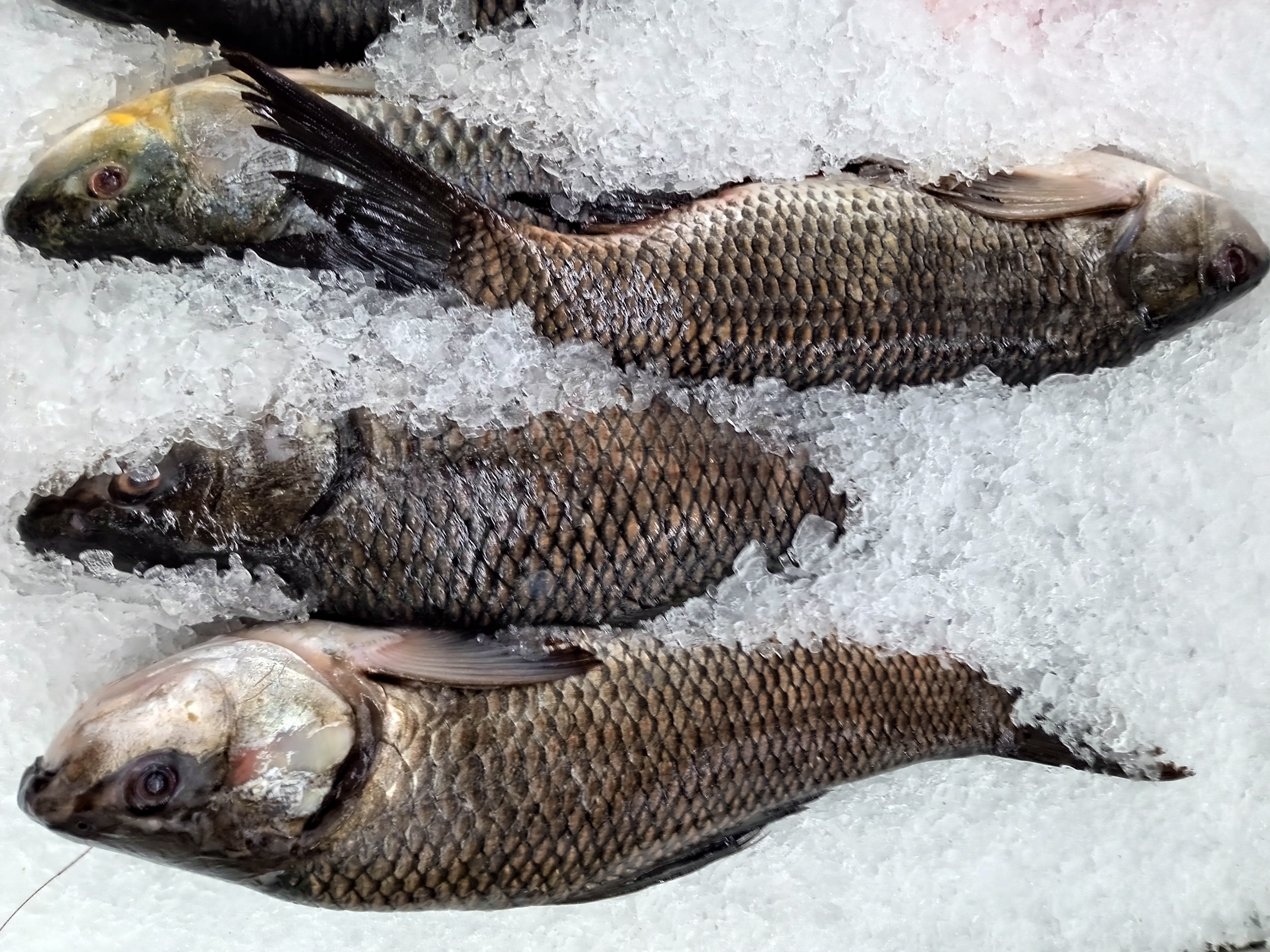

Conservation status
- Least Concern (IUCN 3.1)

Scientific classification
- Kingdom: Animalia
- Phylum: Chordata
- Class: Actinopterygii
- Division: Teleostei
- Order: Cypriniformes
- Family: Cyprinidae
- Subfamily: Labeoninae
- Genus: Labeo
- Species: L. rohita

Binomial name
- Labeo rohita F. Hamilton, 1822

Synonyms
- Cyprinus rohita Hamilton, 1822

= Rohu =

Species of fish

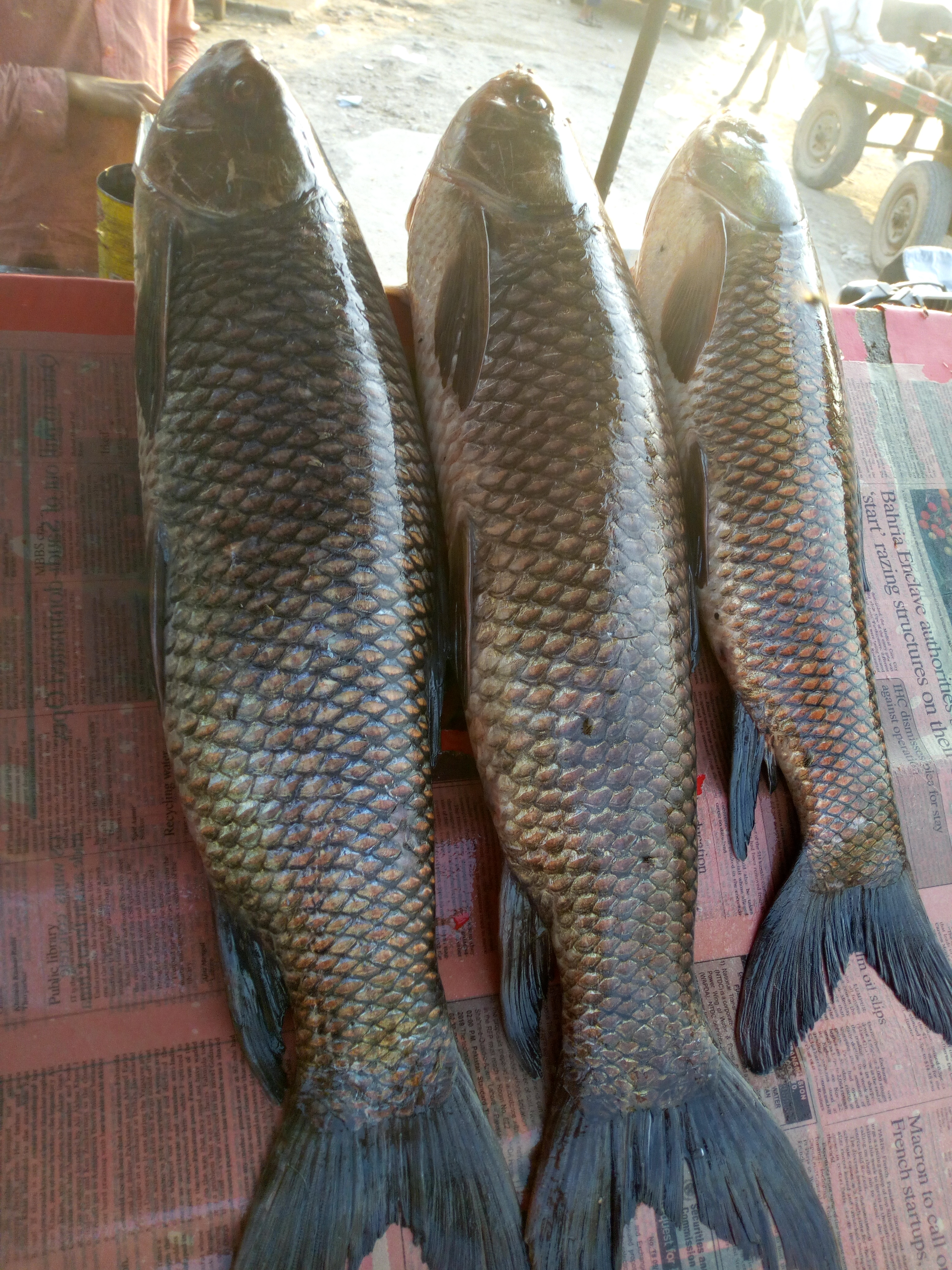
Caught rohu for sale at Kurriro, Danbiro Machi

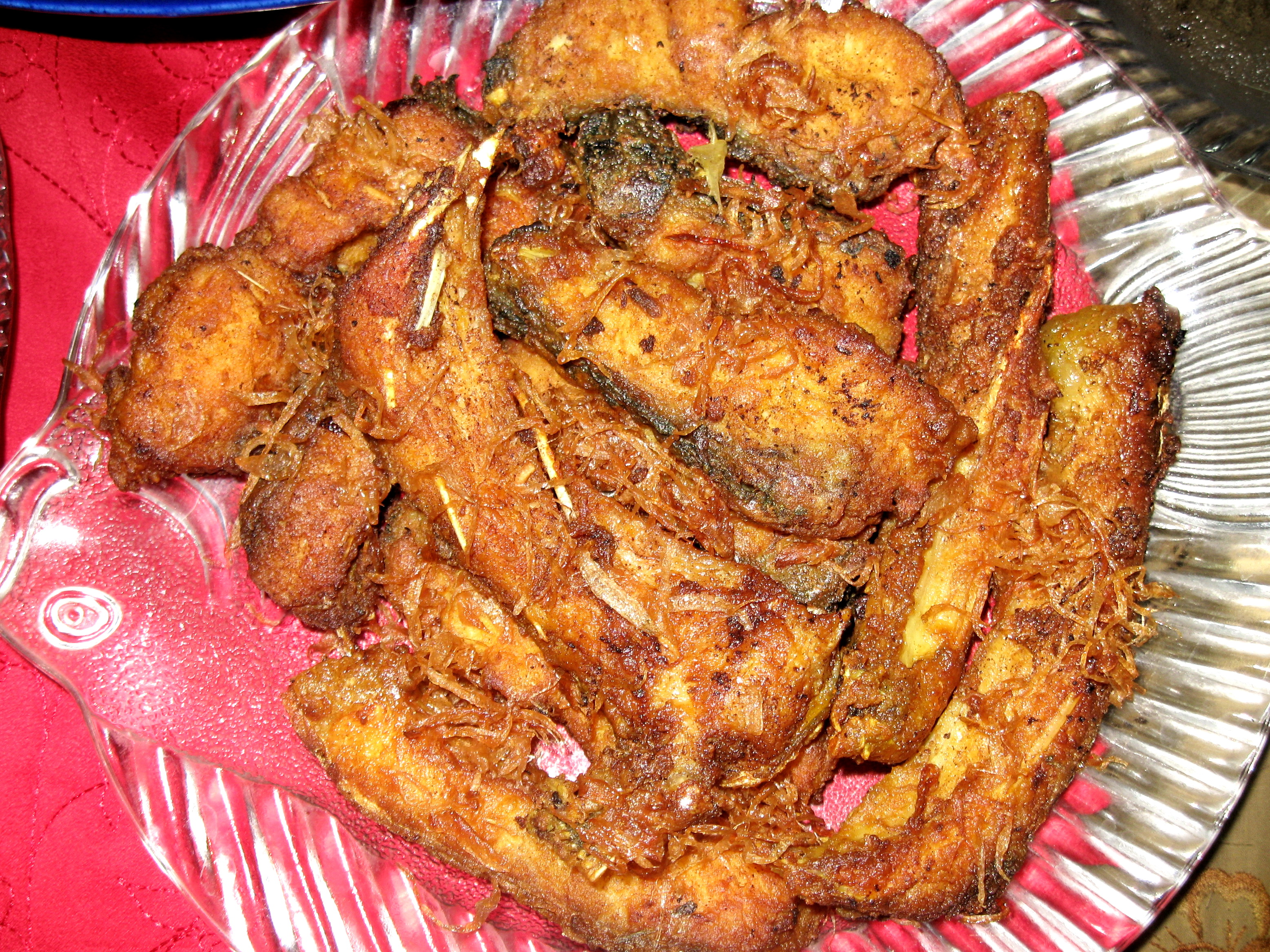
Fried rui dish, Bangladesh.

The rohu, rui, ruhi, rou or roho labeo (Labeo rohita) is a species of fish of the carp family, found in rivers in South Asia. It is a large omnivore and extensively used in aquaculture.

== Description ==
The rohu is a large, silver-colored fish of typical cyprinid shape, with a conspicuously arched head. Adults can reach a maximum weight of 45 kg (99 lb) and maximum length of 2 m (6.6 ft), but average around 1/2 m (1.6 ft).

== Distribution and habitat ==
The rohu occurs in rivers throughout much of northern and central and eastern India, Pakistan, Vietnam, Bangladesh, Nepal and Myanmar, and has been introduced into some of the rivers of Peninsular India and Sri Lanka.

== Ecology ==
The species is an omnivore with specific food preferences at different life stages. During the early stages of its lifecycle, it eats mainly zooplankton, moving onto phytoplankton in later stages of life. Rohu are herbivorous column feeders, eating mainly phytoplankton and submerged vegetation. It has modified, thin hair-like gill rakers, which it uses to feeds by sieving the water.

Rohu reach sexual maturity between two and five years of age. They generally spawn during the monsoon season, keeping to the middle of flooded rivers above tidal reach. The spawning season of rohu generally coincides with the southwest monsoon. Spawn may be collected from rivers and reared in tanks and lakes.

The Rohu can be infested by the acanthocephalan parasite Paraechinorhynchus kalriai which attaches to the inner lining of the small intestine.

== Aquaculture ==
Global aquaculture production of Roho labeo (Labeo rohita) in million tonnes from 1950 to 2022, as reported by the FAO

The rohu is an important aquacultured freshwater species in South Asia. When cultured, it does not breed in lake ecosystems, so induced spawning is necessary. The rohu is also prized as a game fish.

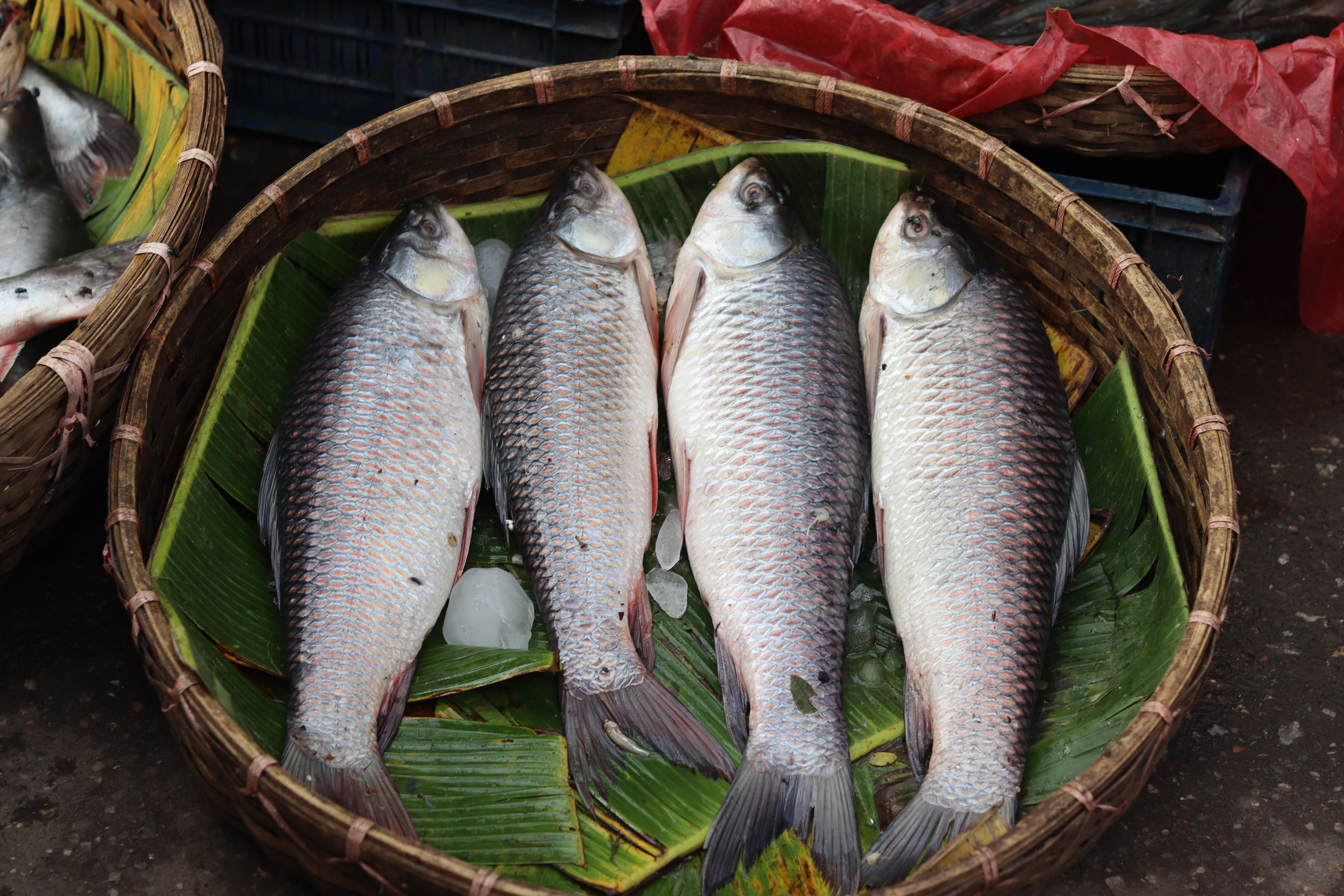
Labeo rohita selling at fish market in Dhaka, Bangladesh

== Preparation as food ==
Rohu is very commonly eaten in Bangladesh, Bhutan, Nepal, Pakistan and the Indian states of Tripura, Nagaland, Bihar, Odisha, Assam, West Bengal, Andhra Pradesh, Telangana, Tamilnadu and Uttar Pradesh. A recipe for fried Rohu fish is mentioned in Manasollasa, a 12th-century Sanskrit encyclopedia compiled by Someshvara III, who ruled from present-day Karnataka. In this recipe, the fish is marinated in asafoetida and salt after being skinned. It is then dipped in turmeric mixed in water before being fried.

Rohu caught in Mithila are known as Mithila Rohu Machh (Maithili: मिथिला रोहु माछ) and considered tastier than the Rohu varieties found in the coastal areas. The Bihar State government is currently making efforts to establish a List of geographical indications in India (GI) tag for the fish.

== Nutrition ==
Rohu is rich in Omega 3 fatty acids, Vitamin A, Vitamin B and Vitamin C. It is also rich in Vitamin D, a Vitamin which is present only in a few foods and consumption of the fish may prevent Osteoporosis, a Vitamin D deficiency disease. It is also a good source of high quality protein.

== See also ==
- Catla
