= List of agricultural universities and colleges =

This article lists agricultural universities and colleges around the world, by continent and country.

== Africa ==
=== Algeria ===
- Higher National Agronomic School (French name: Ecole Nationale Supérieure Agronomique)

=== Benin ===
- Agricultural University of Ketou (French name: Université Agricole de Kétou)
- Faculty of Agronomic Sciences (French name: Faculté des Sciences Agronomiques)

=== Cameroon ===
- Department of Agriculture and Veterinary Medicine (Agro-Vet), Université des Montagnes
- Faculty of Agriculture and Veterinary Medicine, University of Buea
- Faculty of Agriculture and Agricultural Sciences, University of Dschang
- Higher Institute of the Sahel (ISS), Department of Agriculture, Livestock and Agricultural Derived Products, University of Maroua
- college of technologyUniversity of Bamenda

=== Democratic Republic of Congo ===
- Institut Facultaire des Sciences Agronomiques de Yangambi (IFA/Yangambi)
- National Institute of Agronomic Studies and Research (INERA)

=== Egypt ===
- Faculty of Agriculture, Alexandria University
- Faculty of Agriculture, Ain Shams University
- Faculty of Agriculture, Suez Canal University
- Faculty of Agriculture, Al-Azhar University
- Faculty of Agriculture, Assiut University
- Faculty of Agriculture, Aswan University
- Faculty of Agriculture, Beniswaif University
- Faculty of Agriculture, Benha University
- Faculty of Agriculture, Cairo University
- Faculty of Agriculture, Damanhour University
- Faculty of Agriculture, Damietta University
- Faculty of Agriculture, Fayoum University
- Faculty of Agriculture, Kafrelsheikh University
- Faculty of Agriculture, Mansoura University
- Faculty of Agriculture, Minia University
- Faculty of Agriculture, Monofia University
- Faculty of Agriculture, Sohag University
- Faculty of Agriculture, South Valley University
- Faculty of Agriculture, Tanta University
- Faculty of Agriculture, Zagazig University
- Faculty of Organic Agriculture, Heliopolies University

=== Ethiopia ===
- Arba Minch University
- Aksum University
- College of Agriculture and Environmental Sciences, Bahir Dar University
- College of Agriculture and Veterinary Medicine, Jimma University
- College of Agriculture and Natural Resources Sciences, Debre Berhan University
- Debre Markos University College of Agriculture and Natural Resources
- Gewane Agricultural College
- Haramaya University
- Wondo Genet College of Forestry and Natural Resources, Hawassa University
- Mekelle University
- Raya University
- Wolaita Sodo University

=== Ghana ===
- College of Agriculture (University of Education Winneba) Mampong
- College of Agriculture and Consumer Sciences, University of Ghana
- College of Agriculture and Natural Resources, Kwame Nkrumah University of Science and Technology
- Faculty of Agribusiness and Communication Sciences (University for Development Studies) Tamale
- school of Agriculture, University of Cape Coast
- Faculty of Agriculture, University for Development Studies
- Department of Agribusiness Management and Finance (University for Development Studies) Tamale
- Kwadaso Agricultural College, Kumasi (Agricultural University of Ghana)
- University of Energy and Natural Resource, Sunyani

=== Guyana ===
- Guyana School of Agriculture

=== Kenya ===
- Faculty of Agriculture, University of Nairobi
- Egerton University
- Jomo Kenyatta University of Agriculture and Technology
- Pwani University, School of Agricultural Sciences and Agribusiness
- Kenyatta University School of Agriculture and Enterprise Development
- Dairy Training Institute Naivasha (DTI Naivasha)

=== Malawi ===
- Lilongwe University of Agriculture and Natural Resources-Bunda College Campus
- Lilongwe University of Agriculture and Natural Resources-Natural Resources College campus

=== Morocco ===
- Hassan II Institute of Agronomy and Veterinary Medicine

=== Niger ===
- Faculty of Agronomy of Niamey (French name: Faculté d'Agronomie de Niamey)

=== Nigeria ===
- Faculty of Agriculture, University of Abuja, Abuja.
- University of Ilorin, Ilorin, Kwara State
- Audu Bako School of Agriculture, Dambatta, Kano State
- Ahmadu Bello University, Zaria, Kaduna State
- Federal College of Agriculture, Ishiagu
- Federal College of Animal Health and Production Technology, Vom
- Federal University of Technology Owerri
- Kwara State University, Ilorin
- Ladoke Akintola University of Technology, Ogbomosho
- Michael Okpara University of Agriculture, Umudike
- Obafemi Awolowo University, Ile-Ife
- The Polytechnic, Ibadan
- University of Agriculture, Abeokuta
- University of Agriculture, Makurdi
- University of Ibadan, Ibadan
- University of Nigeria, Nsukka

=== Sierra Leone ===
- Njala University
- University of Sierra Leone
- University of Makeni (UNIMAK)

=== Somalia ===
- Zamzam University of Science and Technology, Faculty of Agriculture
- Baidoa international university
- Benadir University

=== South Africa ===
- Free State University, Faculty of Natural and Agricultural Sciences
- Stellenbosch University, Faculty of AgriSciences
- Elsenburg Agricultural Training College, Western Cape Government, Department of Agriculture
- Nelson Mandela Metropolitan University, Department of Agriculture
- University of Fort Hare, Faculty of Science and Agriculture
- University of Pretoria, Faculty of Natural and Agricultural Sciences
- Fort Cox College of Agriculture and Forestry, faculties of Agriculture and Forestry
- Cape Peninsula University of Technology, Department of Applied Sciences
- Majuba College, Nelspruit, Department of Agriculture
- North-West University, Department of Agriculture.
- Cedara College of Agriculture Kwazulu Natal Government, Department of Agriculture
- TompiSeleka College of Agriculture, in Limpopo Province
- Madzivhandila College of Agriculture, in Limpopo Province
- Glen College of Agriculture, in Free State Province
- Tsolo College of Agriculture, in Eastern Cape Province
- Taung College of Agriculture, in North West Province
- Potchefstroom College of Agriculture, in North West Province
- Owen Sithole College of Agriculture, in Kwazulu Natal Province
- Grootfontein College of Agriculture, in Western Cape Province
- Lowveld College of Agriculture, in Mpumalanga Province
- University of Limpopo, Faculty of Environmental Sciences and Agriculture.

=== Sudan ===
- Faculty of Agriculture, University of Khartoum
- Sudan University of Science and Technology College of Agricultural Studies
- Agricultural Technology – Elneelin University
- Faculty of Agriculture, Gezira University
- faculty of agricultural, kassala university
- Faculty of Animal Production, Gazira University
- Faculty of Agriculture, University of Zalingei
- faculty of agriculture, sinnar university
- Faculty of Agriculture, University of Gadarif

=== Tanzania ===
- Sokoine University of Agriculture
- Maruku Agriculture Training Institute (MATI Maruku)

=== Togo ===
- School of Agronomy of the University of Lome ('French name: Ecole Supérieure d'Agronomie de l'Université de Lomé)

=== Tunisia ===
- Institut Supérieur Agronomique de Chott-Mariem
- Institut National Agronomique de Tunisie
- Institut Supérieur Agronomique de Mograne
- Ecole Supérieure d'Agriculture Mateur
- Ecole Supérieure d'Agriculture du Kef

=== Uganda ===
- Bukalasa Agricultural College
- Makerere University
- Gulu University Faculty of Agriculture and Environment
- Kentim University Uganda Project – Department of Agriculture
- Kyambogo University
- Eastern Polytechnic
- Uganda Christian University
- Nkumba University
- Bishop Stuart University
- Kitgum Agriculture and Vocational Institute
- Mbarara University of Science & Technology
- Ndejje University

=== Zambia ===
- University of Zambia
- Natural Resources Development College
- Copperbelt University
- Zambia College of Agriculture, Monze
- Zambia College of Agriculture, Mpika
- Knsit University

=== Zimbabwe ===
- University of Zimbabwe
- Midlands State University
- Chinhoyi University of Technology
- Bindura University of Science Education
- Lupane State University
- Esigodini College of Agriculture
- Mlezu College of Agriculture
- Rio Tinto College of Agriculture
- Chibero College of Agriculture
- Kushinga Pikelela College of Agriculture
- Mazowe Veterinary College

== Asia ==
=== Afghanistan ===
- Balkh University
- Bamyan University
- Herat University
- Kabul University
- Al-Beroni University
- Kandahar University
- Nangarhar University
- Paktia University
- Shaikh Zayed University
- Takhar University
- Shaikh Zayed University, Khost
- Baghlan University

=== Azerbaijan ===
- Azerbaijan State Agricultural University

=== Bangladesh ===
Government or public

- Bangladesh Agricultural University
- Sher-e-Bangla Agricultural University
- Bangabandhu Sheikh Mujibur Rahman Agricultural University
- Sylhet Agricultural University
- Khulna Agricultural University
- Patuakhali Science and Technology University (Faculty of Agriculture, Faculty of Fisheries, Faculty of Animal Science and Veterinary Medicine)
- Noakhali Science and Technology University (Department of Agriculture, Department of Fisheries and Marine Science)
- Hajee Mohammad Danesh Science and Technology University (Faculty of Agriculture)
- Khulna University (Agrotechnology Discipline)
- Rajshahi University (Faculty of Agriculture)
- Bangabandhu Sheikh Mujibur Rahman Science and Technology University (Faculty of Agriculture)
- Chittagong Veterinary and Animal Science University
- Kurigram Agricultural University
- Habiganj Agricultural University

Private

- Daffodil International University (Faculty of Agriculture Sciences)
- International University of Business Agriculture and Technology (College of Agricultural Science)
- Gono Bishwabidyalay (Faculty of Agriculture)
- Exim Bank Agricultural University Bangladesh
- First Capital University (Faculty of Agriculture)
- Ishakha International University, Bangladesh (Faculty of Agriculture)
- Atish Dipankar University of Science and Technology
- City University, Bangladesh (Faculty of agriculture)

=== Cambodia ===
- Prek Leap National Institute of Agriculture

=== China ===
- Anhui Agricultural University
- China Agricultural University, Beijing
- Fujian Agriculture and Forestry University
- Gansu Agricultural University
- Huazhong Agricultural University, Wuhan
- Hunan Agricultural University
- Hebei Agricultural University
- Henan Agricultural University
- Inner Mongolia Agricultural University
- Jiangxi Agricultural University
- Nanjing Agricultural University
- Northeast Agricultural University, Harbin
- Northwest A&F University, Xianyang
- Qingdao Agricultural University
- Shandong Agricultural University
- Shanxi Agricultural University
- Shenyang Agricultural University
- Sichuan Agricultural University
- South China Agricultural University, Guangzhou
- Tianjin Agricultural University
- Xinjiang Agricultural University
- Yunnan Agricultural University
- Zhejiang A & F University

=== India ===
- Acharya N. G. Ranga Agricultural University, Hyderabad
- Aligarh Muslim University, Aligarh
- Anand Agricultural University, Anand, Gujarat
- Annamalai University, Chidambaram, Tamil Nadu, India
- Assam Agricultural University, Jorhat
- Banaras Hindu University, Varanasi
- Bihar Agricultural University, Bhagalpur
- School of Agriculture, Brainware University, Kolkata, West Bengal
- Bidhan Chandra Krishi Viswavidyalaya, West Bengal
- Birsa Agricultural University, Kanke, RanchiJharkhand
- Central Institute of Fisheries Education, Mumbai
- Central Institute of Fisheries Technology, Kochi, Kerala
- Central Agricultural University, Imphal
- Chandra Shekhar Azad University of Agriculture and Technology, Kanpur
- Chaudhary Charan Singh Haryana Agricultural University, Hisar
- Chaudhary Sarwan Kumar Himachal Pradesh Krishi Vishvavidyalaya, Palampur
- College of Agricultural Technology, Theni
- Dr. Y.S.R. Horticultural University, West Godavari, Andhra Pradesh
- Dr. Balasaheb Sawant Konkan Krishi Vidyapeeth, Dapoli
- Dr. Panjabrao Deshmukh Krishi Vidyapeeth, Akola
- Dr. Yashwant Singh Parmar University of Horticulture and Forestry, Solan
- DAV University, Jalandhar
- Dev Bhoomi Group of Institutions
- GIET University, Gunupur, Odisha
- G. B. Pant University of Agriculture and Technology, Pantnagar
- Guru Angad Dev Veterinary and Animal Sciences University, Ludhiana
- Himalayan Institute of Technology, Dehradun
- Indian Agricultural Research Institute, New Delhi
- Rani Avanti Bai Lodhi College Of Agriculture and Research Station, Chhuikhadan
- Indian Veterinary Research Institute, Bareilly
- Jawaharlal Nehru Agricultural University, Jabalpur
- Junagadh Agricultural University, Junagadh
- Kerala Agricultural University, Vellanikkara, Thrissur
- Kerala University of Fisheries and Ocean Studies, Kochi
- Kerala Veterinary and Animal Sciences University, Wayanad
- Karnataka Veterinary, Animal and Fisheries Sciences University, Bidar
- Lala Lajpat Rai University of Veterinary and Animal Sciences, Hisar
- Lovely Professional University, Phagwara
- Quantum University, Dehradun
- Maharashtra Animal and Fishery Sciences University
- Mahatma Phule Krishi Vidyapeeth, Rahuri
- Marathwada Agricultural University, Parbhani
- Maharana Pratap University of Agriculture and Technology, Udaipur
- Manyawar Shri Kanshiram Ji University of Agriculture and Technology
- Nagaland University
- Narendra Dev University of Agriculture and Technology, Faizabad
- National Dairy Research Institute, Karnal
- Orissa University of Agriculture and Technology, Bhubaneswar
- Professor Jayashankar Telangana State Agricultural University, Rajendranagar, Hyderabad
- Punjab Agricultural University, Ludhiana
- Rajendra Agricultural University, Samastipur
- RNB Global University, Bikaner
- Chandigarh University
- Sam Higginbottom University of Agriculture, Technology and Sciences
- Sardarkrushinagar Dantiwada Agricultural University, Banaskantha, Gujarat
- Sher-e-Kashmir University of Agricultural Sciences and Technology of Jammu
- Sher-e-Kashmir University of Agricultural Sciences and Technology of Kashmir, Srinagar
- Sri Konda Laxman Telangana State Horticultural University, Hyderabad
- Swami Keshwanand Rajasthan Agricultural University, Bikaner
- Tamil Nadu Agricultural University, Coimbatore, Tamil Nadu
- Tamil Nadu Veterinary and Animal Sciences University, Madhavaram, Chennai.
- Tamil Nadu Fisheries University, Thalainayeru, Nagapattinam, Tamil Nadu, India
- Tilka Manjhi Agriculture College, Godda, Jharkhand, India
- Sam Higginbottom Institute of Agriculture, Technology and Sciences, Allahabad
- Baba Saheb Dr. B.R.A. College of Agriculture Engineering & Technology, Etawah
- University of Agricultural Sciences, Bangalore
- University of Agricultural Sciences, Dharwad
- University of Agricultural Sciences, Raichur
- University of Horticultural Sciences, Bagalkot
- University of Agricultural and Horticultural Sciences, Shimoga
- Uttar Pradesh Pandit Deen Dayal Upadhyaya Pashu Chikitsa Vigyan Vishwavidyalaya Evam Go Anusandhan Sansthan, Mathura
- Uttarakhand University of Horticulture and Forestry
- Uttar Banga Krishi Viswavidyalaya, Cooch Behar
- Palli Siksha Bhavana, Visva-Bharati University, Santiniketan
- West Bengal University of Animal and Fishery Sciences, Kolkata
- Agricultural Universities (India)
- List of forestry universities and colleges
- List of universities in India

=== Indonesia ===
As an agricultural country, Indonesia has a lot of public and private agricultural education institutions. They consist of universities, polytechnics, and colleges.

- Bogor Agricultural University, Bogor
- University of Brawijaya, Malang
- Gadjah Mada University, Yogyakarta
- Padjadjaran University, Sumedang
- University of Muhammadiyah Yogyakarta, Yogyakarta
- Udayana University, Bali
- University of Sumatera Utara, Medan
- School of Life Sciences and Technology, Bandung Institute of Technology, Bandung
- Syiah Kuala University, Banda Aceh
- University of Jember, Jember
- UPN Veteran Yogyakarta, Yogyakarta

=== Iran ===
- Faculty of Agriculture, Bu Ali Sina University of Hamedan
- College of Agriculture, University of Jiroft
- Gorgan University of Agricultural Sciences and Natural Resources
- Eghlid University of Agricultural Sciences
- Islamic Azad University of Qaemshahr
- Islamic Azad University of Shabestar
- Sari Agricultural Sciences and Natural Resources University
- Faculty of Agricultural Sciences & Natural Resources, Arak University, Arak University
- Faculty of Agriculture, Ferdowsi University of Mashhad
- Gonbad Kavous University* Faculty of Agriculture, Guilan University
- College of Agriculture, Isfahan University of Technology
- Islamic Azad University
  - Faculty of Agriculture, Azadshahr Branch
  - Faculty of Agriculture, Isfahan Branch Khorasgan
  - Faculty of Agriculture, Karaj Branch
  - Faculty of Agriculture, Roudehen Branch
  - Faculty of Agriculture, Science and Research Branch
  - Faculty of Agriculture, Varamin Branch
- Khouzesatn-Ramin Agricultural and Natural Resources University
- College of Agriculture, Shahed University
- Faculty of Agriculture, Shiraz University
- Faculty of Agriculture, University of Kurdistan
- University of Tabriz
- Faculty of Agriculture, Tarbiat Modares University
- University of Tehran
  - College of Abureyhan
  - Karaj College of Agriculture and Natural Resources* Faculty of Agriculture, University of Zanjan
- Faculty of Agriculture, Urmia University
- َAgricultural Research Institute, Iranian Research Organization for Science & Technology

=== Iraq ===
- Technical College Al-Musaib, Al-furat Al-Awast Technical University
- Faculty of Agriculture, University of Babylon
- Faculty of Agriculture, University of Baghdad
- Faculty of Agriculture, University of Basra
- Faculty of Agriculture, University of Mosul
- Faculty of Agriculture, University of Kwofa
- Faculty of Agriculture, University of Thi-Gar
- Faculty of Agriculture, University of Maissan
- Faculty of Agriculture, University of Waset
- Faculty of Agriculture, University of Anbar
- Faculty of Agriculture, University of Dyalla
- Faculty of Agriculture, University of Karbala
- Faculty of Agriculture, University of Aldewania
- Faculty of Agriculture, University of Salah Aldean
- Faculty of Agriculture, University of Alswlaimania
- Faculty of Agriculture, University of Arbil
- Faculty of Agriculture, University of Dhowk
- Faculty of Agriculture, University of Tehran

=== Israel ===
- Robert H. Smith Faculty of Agriculture, Food and Environment, Hebrew University of Jerusalem

=== Japan ===
National and public

- Akita Prefectural University (Science biological resources)
- Chiba University (Faculty of Horticulture)
- Ehime University
- Fukui Prefectural University (Faculty of Bioresources)
- Gifu University (part of Applied Biological Sciences)
- Hirosaki University (Faculty of Agriculture and Life Sciences)
- Hiroshima University (Faculty of Biological productivity)
- Hokkaido University
- Ibaraki University
- Ishikawa Prefectural University (Faculty of Biological Resources and Environment)
- Iwate University
- Kagawa University
- Kagoshima University
- Kobe University
- Kochi University
- Kyoto Prefectural University (Faculty of Life and Environmental)
- Kyoto University
- Kyushu University
- Mie University (Faculty of Bioresources)
- Miyagi University (School of food industry)
- Nagoya University
- Niigata University
- Obihiro University of Agriculture and Veterinary Medicine (Faculty of Animal Husbandry)
- Okayama University
- Osaka Prefectural University (range of Life and Environmental Sciences)
- Prefectural University of Hiroshima (Faculty of Life and Environmental)
- Prefectural University of Kumamoto (Faculty of Symbiotic)
- Saga University
- Shimane University (Faculty of Bioresources)
- Shinshu University
- Shizuoka University
- Tohoku University
- Tokyo University of Agriculture and Technology
- Tottori University
- University of Miyazaki
- University of Shiga Prefecture (Faculty of Environmental Sciences)
- University of the Ryukyus
- University of Tokyo
- University of Tsukuba (College of Life and Environmental Sciences group biological resources)
- University of Yamanashi (Faculty of Life and Environmental)
- Utsunomiya University
- Yamagata University
- Yamaguchi University

Private

- Chubu University (Faculty of Applied Biological)
- Kinki University
- Kyoto Gakuen University (Faculty of Environmental Biotechnology)
- Meiji University
- Meijo University
- Minami Kyushu University (Faculty of Health and Nutrition, Faculty of Environmental Horticulture)
- Nagahama Institute of Bio-Science and Technology (Faculty of Biosciences)
- Nihon University (part Bioresource Science)
- Nippon Veterinary and Life Science University (Applied Life Sciences)
- Okayama University of Science (scheduled to open in April 2012, Faculty of Earth organisms)
- Rakuno Gakuen University (Agriculture food group Environmental Studies)
- Ryukoku University (scheduled to open in April 2015)
- Tamagawa University
- Tokai University
- Tokyo University of Agriculture (Faculty of Biology, Faculty of Industry and Food Sciences and International Environmental and Regional Applied Biological Sciences section)

=== Malaysia ===
- University College of Agroscience Malaysia
- Universiti Malaysia Kelantan
- Universiti Putra Malaysia
- Universiti Malaysia Sabah
- Universiti Malaysia Terengganu
- Universiti Sultan Zainal Abidin
- Universiti Teknologi MARA Faculty of Plantation and Agrotechnology
- Universiti Tunku Abdul Rahman Faculty of Science

=== Myanmar ===
- Yezin Agricultural University
- Advanced Center for Agricultural Research and Education, Yezin, Naypyitaw
- State Agriculture Institute (Pyinmana)
- State Agriculture Institute (Shwebo)
- State Agriculture Institute (Myaungmya)
- State Agriculture Institute (Tharyarwaddy)

=== Nepal ===
1. Institute of Agriculture and Animal Sciences (IAAS), Tribhuvan University, Kathmandu
2. Institute of Agriculture and Animal Sciences, Tribhuvan University, Lamjung campus, Sundarbazar, Lamjung
3. Institute of Agriculture and Animal Sciences, Tribhuvan University, Paklihawa
4. Institute of Agriculture and Animal Sciences, Tribhuvan University, Gauradaha Agriculture Campus, Jhapa
5. Institute of Agriculture and Animal Sciences, Tribhuvan University, Khairahani Agriculture Campus, Chitwan
6. Mahendra Ratna Multiple Campus, Ilam (IAAS/Tribhuvan University), B.Sc. Horticulture
  - Gokuleshwor Agriculture & Animal Science College (GAASC), Baitadi
  - Prithu Technical College, Dang
  - Mid west academy and research and research institute, college of live science, Dang
7. Agriculture and Forestry University]], Chitwan
  - CNRM, Puranchaur, Kaski
  - CNRM, Pakhribas
  - CNRM, Tikapur
  - CNRM, Sindhuli
  - CNRM, Bardibas
  - CNRM, Rolpa
  - CNRM, Khajura
  - CNRM, Dullu
8. Far Western University
  - Faculty of Agriculture | School of Agriculture, Tikapur, Kailali
9. Purbanchal University
  - GP Koirala College of Agriculture & Research Center (GPCAR), Gothgaun, Morang
  - Nepal Polytechnic Institute Bharatpur-11 Bhojod, Chitwan
  - Himalayan College of Agricultural Sciences & Technology (HICAST)

=== North Korea ===
- Pyongyang University of Science and Technology, Pyongyang
- Chongjin University of Agriculture, Chongjin, North Hamgyeong Province
- Hyesan University of Agriculture, Hyesan, Ryanggang Province
- Kanggye University of Agriculture, Kanggye, Jagang Province
- Hamhung University of Agriculture, Hamhung, South Hamgyeong Province
- Nampo University of Agriculture, Nampo, South Pyongan Province
- Nampo University of Fisheries, Nampo, South Pyongan Province
- Kim Je Won University of Agriculture, Haeju, South Hwanghae Province
- Sinuiju University of Agriculture, Sinuiju, North Pyongan Province
- Wonsan University of Agriculture, Wonsan, Kangwon Province

=== Pakistan ===
- Sindh Agriculture University, Tando Jam
- Shaheed Benazir Bhutto University of Veterinary Animal Sciences, Sakrand
- Muhammad Nawaz Shareef University of Agriculture (MNSUA), Multan, Punjab
- Adnan khan shahbazkhail university of Agriculture, Fatehpur,(Layyah)Punjab
- University of Agriculture, Faisalabad (UAF)
- Faculty of Agriculture Gomal university, Dera Ismaeel Khan, Khyber Pakhtoon Khwa
- Faculty of Agriculture Sciences and Technology, Bahauddin Zakariya University, Multan
- Balochistan Agriculture College, Quetta
- Faculty of Agriculture, Gomal University
- Faculty of Agriculture and Environmental sciences, Islamia University, Bahawalpur
- University of Agriculture, Peshawar
- Lasbela University of Agriculture, Water and Marine Sciences, Othal, Lasbela District
- Pir Mehr Ali Shah, Arid Agriculture University, Rawalpindi, Punjab
- University College of Agriculture, Rawalakot
- Dera Ghazi Khan College of Agriculture,(CADGK) University of Agriculture, Faisalabad
- Department of Agriculture and Agribusiness Management, University of Karachi, Karachi
- University of Poonch Rawalakot, Azad Kashmir
- University College of Agriculture, University of Sargodha
- Institute of Agricultural Sciences, University of the Punjab, Lahore
- Zulfikar Ali Bhutto Agriculture College, Dokri
- Department of Environmental Sciences, COMSATS Institute of Information Technology, Vehari, Pakistan
- Zawar Ameer Bux Jamali Agriculture University
- University of Haripur, Haripur, KPK.
- Balochistan Agriculture College, Quetta
- University College Of Agriculture, University Of Sargodha
- Department of Agriculture, Abdul Wali Khan University Mardan

=== Philippines ===
- Ilocos Sur Polytechnic State College
- Benguet State University
- Pampanga Agricultural College
- Cebu Technological University
- Central Bicol State University of Agriculture
- Central Mindanao University
- Central Luzon State University Muñoz, Nueva Ecija
- De La Salle Araneta University
- Negros State College of Agriculture
- Romblon State University
- Tarlac College of Agriculture
- University of the Philippines Los Baños
- University of the Philippines Mindanao
- West Visayas State University-College of Agriculture and Forestry
- Visayas State University
- University of Southern Mindanao
- Xavier University, Ateneo de Cagayan
- Cagayan State University Gonzaga, Cagayan
- Aklan State University Banga, Aklan
- Bicol University College of Agriculture and Forestry
- University of Southeastern Philippines
- Bulacan Agricultural State College
- Southern Luzon State University
- University of Southeastern Philippines Tagum-Mabini Campus

=== Saudi Arabia ===
- King Saud University
- Agricultural and Food Sciences-King Faisal University
- Qassim University
- College of Food and Environment Technology in Buraydah

=== South Korea ===
- Korea National University of Agriculture and Fisheries
- Seoul National University
- Kyungpook National University
- Chonnam National University
- Chungnam National University
- Chonbuk National University
- Chungbuk National University
- Kangwon National University
- Gyeongsang National University
- Jeju National University

=== Sri Lanka ===
- Faculty of Agriculture, Eastern University of Sri Lanka
- Faculty of Agriculture, University of Jaffna
- Faculty of Agriculture, University of Peradeniya
- Faculty of Agriculture, Rajarata University of Sri Lanka
- Faculty of Agriculture, Ruhuna University of Sri Lanka
- Faculty of Agricultural Science, Sabaragamuwa University of Sri Lanka
- Faculty of Agriculture and plantation Management, Wayamba University of Sri Lanka
- Faculty of Animal Science and Export Agriculture, Uwa Wellassa University of Sri Lanka
- Faculty of Engineering Technology, Open University of Sri Lanka
- Institute of Agro Technology and Rural Science, University of Colombo

=== Taiwan ===
Public universities

- National Taiwan University
- National Chung Hsing University
- National Chiayi University
- National Pingtung University of Science and Technology
- National Ilan University

Private universities

- MingDao University

=== Thailand ===
Public universities

- Kasetsart University, Bangkok and Kamphaeng Saen
- Maejo University, Chiang Mai, Phrae and Chumphon
- Chiang Mai University, Chiang Mai
- Khon Kaen University, Khon Kaen
- Prince of Songkla University, Songkla and Surat Thani
- King Mongkut's Institute of Technology Ladkrabang, Bangkok and Chumphon
- Ubon Ratchathani University, Ubon Ratchathani
- Naresuan University, Phitsanulok
- Silpakorn University, Phetchaburi
- Suranaree University of Technology, Nakhon Ratchasima
- Walailak University, Nakhon Si Thammarat
- Thammasat University, faculty of science and technology, Pathum Thani
- Mahidol University, faculty of science, Kanchanaburi
- Chulalongkorn University, School of Agricultural Resources, Bangkok

Private universities

- Rangsit University, College of Agricultural Innovation, Pathum Thani

International institutes

- Asian Institute of Technology, School of Environment, Resources and Development, Pathum Thani

=== Turkmenistan ===
- Turkmen Agricultural Institute

=== United Arab Emirates ===
- College of Food and Agriculture, United Arab Emirates University

=== Vietnam ===
- Hanoi University of Agriculture
- Ho Chi Minh City University of Agriculture and Sylviculture (Nông Lâm University)
- Can Tho University
- Hue University of Agriculture and Forestry (HUAF), Hue University
- Thai Nguyen University of Agriculture and Forestry
- Faculty of Agriculture and Forestry, Dalat University
- Faculty of Agriculture, Phu Yen University
- Bac Giang University of Agriculture and Forestry
- Faculty of Agriculture, Forestry and Fish, Vinh University
- Faculty of Agriculture, Forestry and Fish, Nghe An Economic University

== Oceania ==
=== Australia ===
- Charles Sturt University
- Curtin University
- La Trobe University
- University of Melbourne Faculty of Veterinary and Agricultural Sciences
- University of New England
- University of Sydney
- University of Western Australia
- Western Sydney University
- Murdoch University
- University of Adelaide
- University of Queensland
- University of Tasmania
- Central Queensland University
- University of Newcastle

Private

- Australian College of Agriculture & Horticulture (ACAH), Victoria & Queensland
- Marcus Oldham College

=== New Zealand ===
- Lincoln University
- Massey University
- University of Waikato
- University of Otago

== Central/ South America and Caribbean ==
=== Argentina ===
- National University of La Plata
- National University of Córdoba
- National University of Rosario
- Pontifical Catholic University of Argentina
- University of Buenos Aires
- National University of Lujan
- National University of Cuyo

=== Brazil ===
- Universidade de São Paulo in Piracicaba, São Paulo
- Universidade Estadual de Santa Catarina, in Lages, Santa Catarina
- Universidade Estadual do Norte Fluminense, in Campos dos Goytacazes, Rio de Janeiro
- Universidade Estadual Paulista "Júlio de Mesquita Filho" in Botucatu, São Paulo
- Universidade Estadual Paulista "Júlio de Mesquita Filho" in Dracena, São Paulo
- Universidade Estadual Paulista "Júlio de Mesquita Filho" in Ilha Solteira, São Paulo
- Universidade Estadual Paulista "Júlio de Mesquita Filho" in Jaboticabal, São Paulo
- Universidade Estadual Paulista "Júlio de Mesquita Filho" in Registro, São Paulo
- Universidade Federal de Mato Grosso in Cuiabá, Mato Grosso
- Universidade Federal de Lavras in Lavras, Minas Gerais
- Universidade Federal de Minas Gerais in Montes Claros, Minas Gerais
- Universidade Federal de Pelotas, in Pelotas, Rio Grande do Sul
- Universidade Federal de Santa Catarina, in Florianópolis, Santa Catarina
- Universidade Federal de Santa Maria, in Santa Maria, Rio Grande do Sul
- Universidade Federal de São Carlos, in Araras, São Paulo
- Universidade Federal de Viçosa in Florestal, Minas Gerais
- Universidade Federal de Viçosa in Rio Paranaíba, Minas Gerais
- Universidade Federal de Viçosa in Viçosa, Minas Gerais
- Universidade Federal do Paraná in Curitiba, Paraná
- Universidade Federal do Rio Grande do Norte, EAJ in Macaíba, Rio Grande do Norte
- Universidade Federal do Rio Grande do Sul, in Porto Alegre, Rio Grande do Sul
- Universidade Federal do Semi Árido in Mossoró, Rio Grande do Norte
- Universidade Federal Rural do Rio de Janeiro in Seropédica, Rio de Janeiro
- Universidade Federal Rural de Pernambuco in Recife, Pernambuco
- Universidade Federal do Tocantins in Gurupi, Tocantins

=== Colombia ===
- Universidad de los Llanos https://www.unillanos.edu.co/
- Universidad del Tolima
- Universidad Nacional de Colombia sede Bogotá, Palmira
- Universidad de Antioquia in Medellín, Antioquia
- Universidad Santa Rosa de Cabal (UNISARC; also known as Universidad Rural y Agropecuaria de Colombia), Santa Rosa de Cabal, Risaralda
- University of Applied and Environmental Sciences

=== Costa Rica ===
- Costa Rica Institute of Technology (TEC)
- EARTH University
- National University of Costa Rica (UNA)
- Tropical Agricultural Research and Higher Education Center (CATIE)
- University of Costa Rica, Agronomy School (UCR)

=== Dominican Republic ===
- Instituto Politécnico Loyola – IPL, San Cristóbal
- Universidad ISA, Santiago
- Instituto Tecnológico de Cotuí – ITECO
- Instituto Tecnológico San Ignacio de Loyola – ITESIL, Dajabón
- Universidad Autónoma de Santo Domingo – UASD, Santo Domingo
- Universidad Católica Tecnológica del Cibao – UCATECI, La Vega
- Universidad Nacional Pedro Henríquez Ureña – UNPHU, Santo Domingo

=== Honduras ===
- Zamorano Pan-American Agricultural School

=== Jamaica ===
- College of Agriculture, Science, & Education, Port Antonio

=== Nicaragua ===
- National Agricultural University, Managua

=== Perú ===
- National Agrarian University
- National Saint Louis Gonzaga University

=== Puerto Rico ===
- College of Agriculture, University of Puerto Rico at Mayagüez

== Europe ==
=== Austria ===
- University of Natural Resources and Life Sciences, Vienna

=== Belarus ===
- Belarusian State University of Agricultural Technology, Minsk
- Belarusian State Academy of Agriculture, Horki
- Grodno State Agrarian University, Grodno

=== Belgium ===
- Gembloux Agro-Bio Tech, University of Liège, Gembloux
- Faculty of Bioscience engineering, University of Louvain, Louvain-la-Neuve
- Faculty of Bioscience engineering, Ghent University, Ghent
- Haute école provinciale de Hainaut Condorcet, ath agronomie.

=== Bulgaria ===
- Trakia University, Agricultural Faculty, Stara Zagora
- Agricultural University of Plovdiv, Plovdiv
- University of Forestry, Sofia
- Technical University of Varna, Plant Production Faculty
- Institute of Agricultural Economics, Agricultural Academy, Sofia

=== Croatia ===
- University of Zagreb, Faculty of Agriculture, Faculty of Forestry
- J. J. Strossmayer University of Osijek, Faculty of Agriculture in Osijek
- University of Zadar, Department of Ecology, Agronomy and Aquaculture,

=== Czech Republic ===
- Czech University of Life Sciences Prague
- Mendel University in Brno

=== Denmark ===
- Aarhus University
- Royal Veterinary and Agricultural University (1856–2007)
- University of Copenhagen (2007–)

=== Estonia ===
- Estonian University of Life Sciences
- University of Tartu

=== Finland ===
- School of Agriculture and Forestry, Seinäjoki University of Applied Sciences
- Faculty of Agriculture and Forestry, University of Helsinki
- School of Agriculture and Forestry, (HAMK University of applied Sciences)
- School of Agriculture Savonia University of applied sciences
- Institute of Bioeconomy, JAMK University of Applied Sciences

=== France ===
- ISTOM, , École d'agronomie à Angers
- AgroParisTech (also named Institut des sciences et industries du vivant et de l'environnement), Paris
- École nationale supérieure agronomique de Montpellier or Montpellier SupAgro, Montpellier
- ISA Lille, formerly the Institut Supérieur d'Agriculture de Lille
- École d'ingénieurs de Purpan, or Purpan Toulouse
- Institut Polytechnique Lasalle Beauvais(in French), Beauvais
- École nationale supérieure d'agronomie et des industries alimentaires, Vandoeuvre-lès-Nancy
- Institut national supérieur des sciences agronomiques, de l'alimentation et de l'environnement (in French) or Agrosup Dijon, Dijon
- Agrocampus Ouest, Rennes and Angers
- École nationale supérieure des sciences agronomiques de Bordeaux Aquitaine (in French) or Bordeaux Sciences Agro, Bordeaux
- Institut national d'enseignement supérieur et de recherche en alimentation, santé animale, sciences agronomiques et de l'environnement (in French) or VetAgro Sup, Clermont-Ferrand
- Nantes-Atlantic National College of Veterinary Medicine, Food Science and Engineering (in French, École nationale vétérinaire, agroalimentaire et de l'alimentation, Nantes-Atlantique) (in French) or Oniris, Nantes
- École Nationale Supérieure Agronomique de Toulouse, Toulouse
- Université de technologie de Compiègne, Compiègnes

=== Germany ===
- Kiel University
- University of Bonn
- University of Göttingen
- University of Giessen
- Landwirtschaftlich-Gärtnerische Fakultät, Humboldt University of Berlin (formerly Agricultural University of Berlin)
- Leibniz University Hannover
- Martin Luther University Halle-Wittenberg
- Technical University of Munich
- University of Hohenheim
- University of Kassel
- University of Rostock

=== Greece ===
- Agricultural University of Athens
- Faculty of Agriculture, Forestry and Natural Environment, Aristotle University of Thessaloniki
- Perrotis College at the American Farm School of Thessaloniki
- School of Agricultural Sciences and Forestry, Democritus University of Thrace
- School of Agricultural Sciences, University of Thessaly
- Ελληνικό Μεσογειακό Πανεπιστήμιο https://hmu.gr/

https://agro.hmu.gr/7432-2/syntomh-perigraphh/

- Technological Educational Institute of Epirus
- Technological Educational Institute of Kalamata
- Technological Educational Institute of Kavala
- Technological Educational Institute of Larissa
- Technological Educational Institute of Messolonghi
- Alexander Technological Educational Institute of Thessaloniki
- Technological Educational Institute of West Macedonia

=== Hungary ===
- University of Debrecen, Debrecen
- Kaposvár University, Kaposvár
- Pannon University, Keszthely
- Szent István University, Gödöllő, and Budapest (Budai Campus)
- Széchenyi István University Faculty of Agricultural and Food Science, Mosonmagyaróvár
- University of Szeged Faculty of Engineering, Szeged
- Neumann János University Faculty of Horticulture and Rural development, Kecskemét
- Eszterházy Károly University Faculty of Agriculture and Rural development, Gyöngyös

=== Iceland ===
- Agricultural University of Iceland, Hvanneyri

=== Ireland ===
- Gurteen College, Ballingarry, Roscrea, North Tipperary
- Mountbellew Agricultural College (formerly Franciscan Brothers Agricultural College), Mountbellew, Co. Galway
- University College Dublin, Dublin

=== Italy ===
- Università degli studi di Milano, Agraria, Milan
- University of Naples Federico II, Agraria, Naples
- Alma Mater Studiorum, Agraria, Bologna
- Università degli Studi, Scienze Agrarie, Perugia
- Scienze e Technologie Agrarie, Università Di Padova
- Università degli Studi di Firenze, Scuola di Agraria, Florence
- Università Cattolica del Sacro Cuore Scienze Agrarie, Alimentari ed Ambientali, Piacenza

=== Latvia ===
- Latvia University of Life Sciences and Technologies (formerly Latvia University of Agriculture)

=== Lithuania ===
- Aleksandras Stulginskis University

=== North Macedonia ===
- Faculty of Agricultural Science and Food, Ss. Cyril and Methodius University of Skopje

=== Moldova ===
- Agricultural State University of Moldova

=== The Netherlands ===
- Wageningen University and Research
- HAS University of Applied Sciences
- Van Hall Larenstein
- Inholland University of Applied Sciences

=== Norway ===
- Norwegian University of Life Sciences

=== Poland ===
- University of Life Sciences in Lublin (Uniwersytet Przyrodniczy w Lublinie)
- West Pomeranian University of Technology, Szczecin (Zachodniopomorski Uniwersytet Technologiczny w Szczecinie)
- Agricultural University of Kraków (Uniwersytet Rolniczy w Krakowie)
- University of Life Sciences in Poznań (Uniwersytet Przyrodniczy w Poznaniu)
- Siedlce University of Natural Sciences and Humanities(Uniwersytet Przyrodniczo-Humanistyczny w Siedlcach)
- University of Technology and Life Sciences in Bydgoszcz (Uniwersytet Technologiczno-Przyrodniczy w Bydgoszczy, UTP)
- Warsaw University of Life Sciences (Szkoła Główna Gospodarstwa Wiejskiego)
- Wroclaw University of Environmental and Life Sciences (Uniwersytet Przyrodniczy we Wrocławiu)
- Faculty of Biology and Agriculture ( Wydział Biologiczno-Rolniczy – Uniwersytet Rzeszowski ) Rzeszów University
- Faculty of Environmental Management & Agriculture University of Warmia and Mazury in Olsztyn (Wydział Kształtowania Środowiska i Rolnictwa – Uniwersytet Warmińsko-Mazurski w Olsztynie)

=== Portugal ===
- Agrarian School of Beja, Polytechnic Institute of Beja
- Agrarian School of Bragança, Polytechnic Institute of Bragança
- Agrarian School of Castelo Branco, Polytechnic Institute of Castelo Branco
- Agrarian School of Coimbra, Polytechnic Institute of Coimbra
- Agrarian School of Elvas, Polytechnic Institute of Portalegre
- Agrarian School of Santarém, Polytechnic Institute of Santarém
- Agrarian School of Ponte de Lima, Polytechnic Institute of Viana do Castelo
- Agrarian School of Viseu, Polytechnic Institute of Viseu
- Faculty of Science and Technology, University of the Algarve
- Instituto Superior de Agronomia, University of Lisbon
- School of Sciences and Technology, University of Évora
- School of Agrarian and Veterinary Sciences, University of Trás-os-Montes and Alto Douro

=== Romania ===
- University of Galati, Galati
- Banat University of Agricultural Sciences and Veterinary Medicine, Timișoara
- Ion Ionescu de la Brad University of Agricultural Sciences and Veterinary Medicine of Iași
- University of Agricultural Sciences and Veterinary Medicine of Cluj-Napoca
- University of Agronomic Sciences and Veterinary Medicine, Bucharest

=== Russian Federation ===
- Moscow Agricultural Academy
- Kazan State Agrarian University
- Ural State Agricultural Academy
- Ural State Academy of Veterinary Medicine
- Moscow State Academy of Veterinary Medicine and Biotechnology
- Chelyabinsk State Agricultural Engineering Academy
- Perm State Agricultural Academy
- Izhevsk State Agricultural Academy
- Kuban State Agrarian University
- Don State Agrarian University
- Far Eastern State Agrarian University
- Orenburg State Agrarian University
- Ryazan State Agrotechnological University
- Michurinsk State Agrarian University
- Far Eastern State Technical Fishing University
- Omsk State Agrarian University
- Stavropol State Agrarian University
- Saint Petersburg State Agrarian University
- Saratov State Agrarian University
- Voronezh State Agrarian University
- Tver State Agricultural Academy
- Yaroslavl State Agricultural Academy
- Yakutsk State Agricultural Academy
- Dagestan State Agricultural Academy
- Kurgan State Agricultural Academy
- Vyatka State Agricultural Academy
- Belgorod State Agricultural University
- Penza State Agrarian University

=== Serbia ===
- University of Belgrade
  - Faculty of Agriculture
  - Faculty of Forestry
- University of Novi Sad
  - Faculty of Agriculture

=== Slovakia ===
- Slovak University of Agriculture, Nitra

=== Slovenia ===
- Faculty of Agriculture and Life Sciences, sl:Maribor
- Biotechnical faculty sl:Ljubljana
- Agricultural institute of Slovenia sl:Ljubljana

=== Spain ===
- Faculty of Agriculture, University of Almería
- Faculty of Agriculture, University of Seville
- School of Agrifood and Forestry Science and Engineering (ETSEA), University of Lleida
- School of Agricultural, Food and Biosystems Engineering (ETSIAAB) Polytechnic University of Madrid
- Escola Superior d'Agricultura de Barcelona, Universitat Politecnica de Catalunya

=== Sweden ===
- Swedish University of Agricultural Sciences

=== Switzerland ===
- ETH Zurich
- School of Agricultural, Forest and Food Sciences HAFL

=== Turkey ===
- Ankara University, Faculty of Agriculture
- Ege University, Faculty of Agriculture
- Çukurova University, Faculty of Agriculture
- Atatürk University, Faculty of Agriculture
- Bursa Uludağ University, Faculty of Agriculture
- Selçuk University, Faculty of Agriculture
- Tekirdağ Namık Kemal University, Faculty of Agriculture
- Van Yüzüncü Yıl University, Faculty of Agriculture
- Akdeniz University, Faculty of Agriculture
- Süleyman Demirel University, Faculty of Agriculture
- Aydın Adnan Menderes University, Faculty of Agriculture
- Dicle University, Faculty of Agriculture
- Konya Food and Agriculture University

=== Ukraine ===
- Mykolaiv National Agrarian University
- Tavria State Agrotechnological University
- National University of Life and Environmental Sciences of Ukraine
- Uman National University of Horticulture
- Sumy National Agrarian University
- Kharkiv National Agrarian University named after V.V. Dokuchayev

=== United Kingdom ===
- Aberystwyth University IBERS
- Askham Bryan College
- Berkshire College of Agriculture
- Bicton College
- Brooksby Agricultural College (Melton Mowbray)
- Capel Manor College
- Clinterty Agricultural College
- College of Agriculture, Food and Rural Enterprise, Northern Ireland (CAFRE)
- Downton Agricultural College
- Easton & Otley College
- Hadlow College
- Harper Adams University
- Hartpury College (an associate faculty of the University of the West of England)
- Kingston Maurward College
- Lackham College (part of Wiltshire College)
- Moulton College
- Myerscough College
- Newton Rigg College (part of Askham Bryan College)
- Oaklands College
- Plumpton College
- Reaseheath College
- Rodbaston College (part of South Staffordshire College)
- Royal Agricultural University, Cirencester
- Scotland's Rural College (SRUC; formerly Scottish Agricultural College)
- Shuttleworth College (part of Bedford College)
- Sparsholt College Hampshire
- University of Nottingham
- University of Reading
- Writtle College

== North America ==
=== Canada ===
==== British Columbia ====
- Centre for Agriculture Excellence, University of the Fraser Valley in Chilliwack, British Columbia
- Sustainable Agriculture & Food Systems, Kwantlen Polytechnic University in Richmond, British Columbia
- Faculty of Land and Food Systems, University of British Columbia in Vancouver, British Columbia

==== Alberta ====
- Grande Prairie Regional College in Grande Prairie, Alberta
- Lakeland College in Vermilion, Alberta
- Olds College in Olds, Alberta
- Red Deer College in Red Deer, Alberta
- Department of Agriculture, Food & Nutritional Science, University of Alberta in Edmonton, Alberta
- Centre for Technology, Environment and Design. Lethbridge College, Lethbridge, Alberta

==== Saskatchewan ====
- Carlton Trail Regional College in Humboldt, Saskatchewan
- Cypress Hills College in Swift Current, Saskatchewan
- College of Agriculture and Bioresources at University of Saskatchewan in Saskatoon, Saskatchewan

==== Manitoba ====
- Assiniboine Community College in Brandon, Manitoba
- Faculty of Agricultural and Food Sciences, University of Manitoba in Winnipeg, Manitoba

==== Ontario ====
- Ontario Agricultural College, University of Guelph in Guelph, Ontario
- Ridgetown College, Ontario Agricultural College in Ridgetown, Ontario
- Algonquin College, in Perth, Ontario
- Collège D'Alfred (in French), Ontario Agricultural College in Alfred, Ontario

==== Québec ====
- Institut de technologie agroalimentaire (in French) in La Pocatière, Quebec and Saint-Hyacinthe, Quebec
- Faculté des sciences de l'agriculture et de l'alimentation, Université Laval in Ville de Québec, Québec
- Macdonald Campus, McGill University in Montreal, Québec

==== Nova Scotia ====
- Faculty of Agriculture at Dalhousie University, Bible Hill, Nova Scotia

=== Mexico ===
- Universidad Autónoma Chapingo
- Universidad Autónoma Agraria Antonio Narro
- Universidad Autónoma de Guadalajara
- Universidad de Guadalajara
- Universidad Juárez Autónoma de Tabasco
- Universidad Autónoma de Baja California

=== United States ===
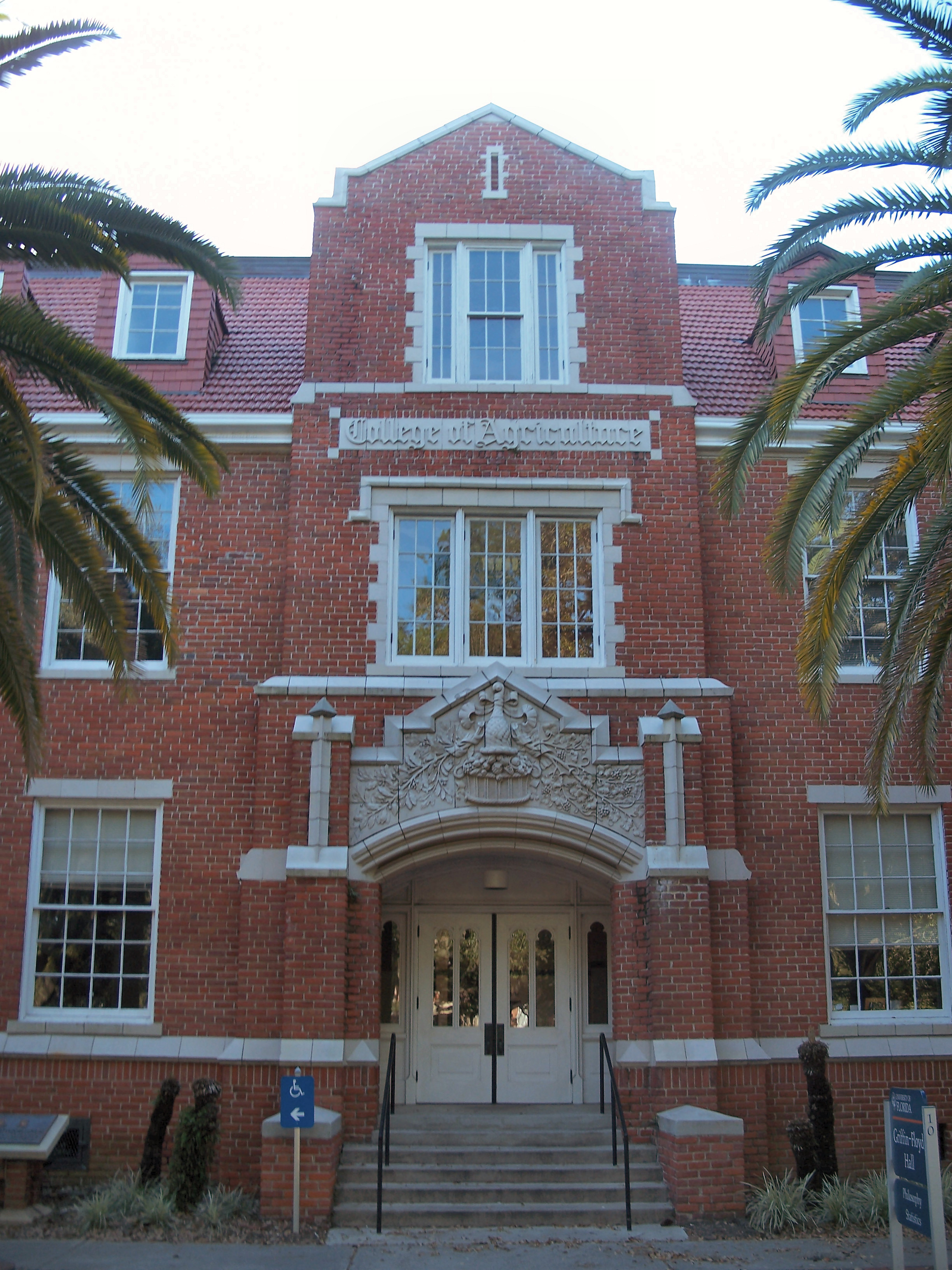
College of Agriculture at the University of Florida

- Abraham Baldwin Agricultural College
- Alabama Agricultural and Mechanical University
- Alcorn State University
- Arizona State University
- Arkansas State University
- Auburn University
- Angelo State University
- California Polytechnic State University
- California State Polytechnic University, Pomona
- California State University Chico (Chico State)
- California State University Fresno (Fresno State)
- Clemson University
- Colorado State University
- Cornell University College of Agriculture and Life Sciences
- Delaware Valley University
- Eastern Kentucky University
- Florida A&M University
- Fort Hays State University
- Fort Valley State University
- Illinois State University
- Iowa State University
- Kansas State University College of Agriculture
- Louisiana State University
- Michigan State University
- Mississippi State University
- Missouri State University
- Montana State University
- Morehead State University
- Murray State University
- Nebraska College of Technical Agriculture
- New Mexico State University
- North Carolina Agricultural and Technical State University
- North Carolina State University College of Agriculture and Life Sciences
- North Dakota State University
- Ohio State University
- Oklahoma State University
- Oregon State University
- Penn State University College of Agricultural Sciences
- Purdue University
- Rutgers University, School of Environmental and Biological Sciences
- South Dakota State University
- Southern Arkansas University
- Southern Illinois University
- Southern University and A&M College, Baton Rouge, Louisiana
- State University of New York at Cobleskill College of Agriculture and Technology, Cobleskill, NY
- Sterling College Rian Fried Center for Sustainable Agriculture & Food Systems, Craftsbury Common, VT
- Stockbridge School of Agriculture
- Texas A&M University
- Texas Tech University
- University of Illinois Urbana-Champaign College of ACES
- University of Alaska Fairbanks
- University of Arizona, College of Agriculture and Life Sciences
- University of Arkansas, Dale Bumpers College of Agricultural, Food and Life Sciences
- University of California, Davis
- University of California, Riverside
- University of California, Santa Cruz
- University of Connecticut
- University of Delaware
- University of Florida College of Agricultural and Life Sciences
- University of Georgia College of Agricultural and Environmental Sciences
- University of Hawaii at Manoa
- University of Idaho
- University of Kentucky College of Agriculture
- University of Maine
- University of Maryland, College Park
- University of Maryland, Eastern Shore
- University of Massachusetts Amherst
- University of Minnesota College of Food, Agricultural and Natural Resource Sciences
- University of Missouri
- University of Nebraska–Lincoln College of Agricultural Sciences and Natural Resources
- University of Nevada, Reno
- University of Rhode Island College of the Environment and Life Sciences
- University of Tennessee, Knoxville Herbert College of Agriculture
- University of Wisconsin–Madison
- University of Wisconsin–River Falls
- University of Wyoming
- Utah State University
- Virginia Polytechnic Institute and State University
- Washington State University
- Western Kentucky University
- West Virginia State University
- West Virginia University

== See also ==
- List of colleges of natural resources
- List of forestry universities and colleges
