= Kincorth Academy =

Former secondary school in Aberdeen, Scotland

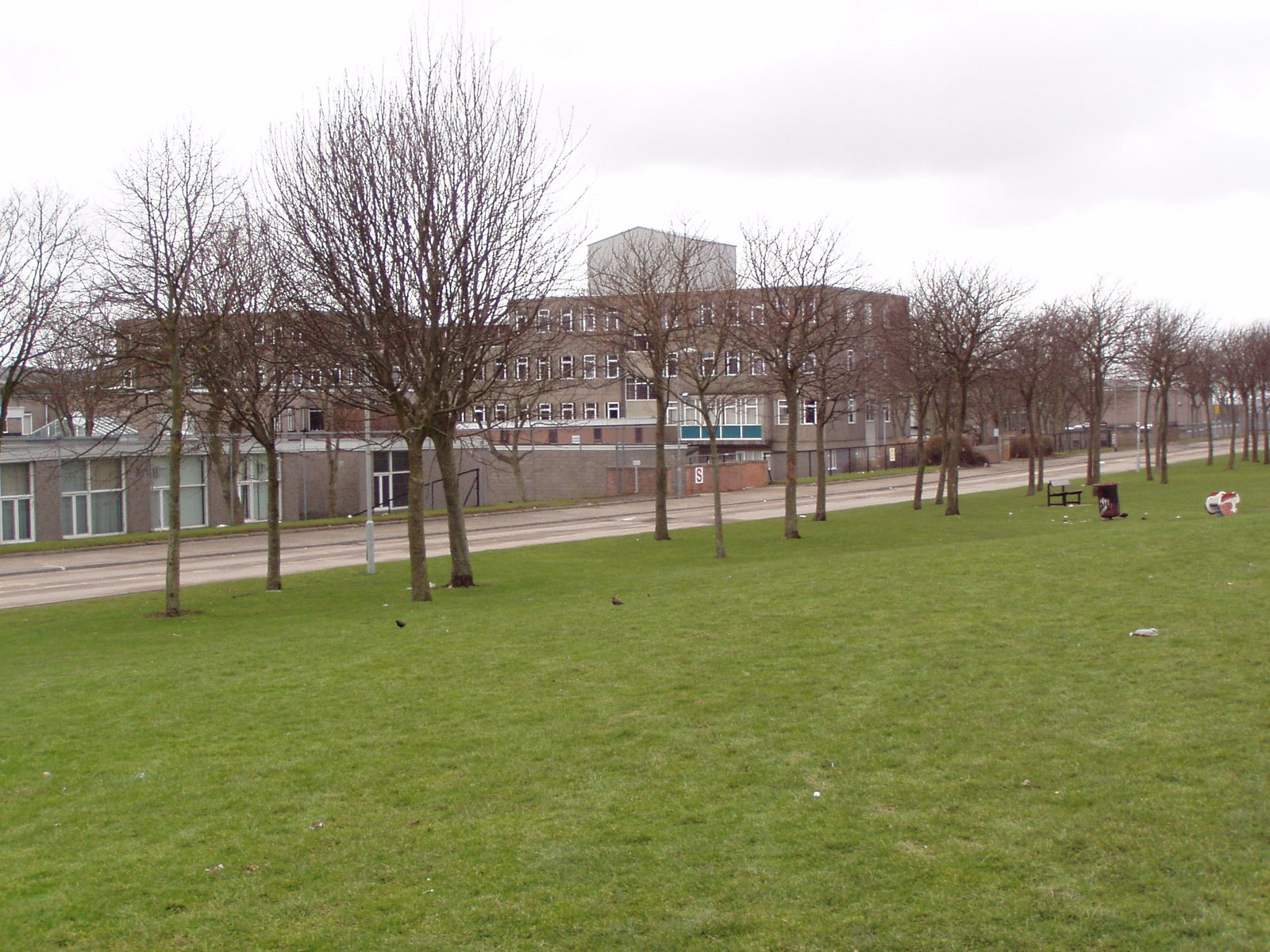

Location
- Kincorth Circle; Aberdeen, AB12 5NL; Scotland

Information
- Type: Secondary school
- Established: 19 August 1971
- Closed: 4 July 2018
- Local authority: Aberdeen City Council
- Gender: Co-educational
- Age: 11 to 18
- Houses: Craigievar, Edinburgh, Fyvie
- Colours: Red and gold
- School years: S1-S6

Kincorth Academy was an Aberdeen City Council secondary school in Kincorth, Aberdeen, Scotland. Local primary feeder schools were: Abbotswell Primary, Charleston Primary, Kirkhill Primary and Loirston Primary.

The school worked in close partnership with Torry Academy in order to offer pupils a wider range of courses, some of which were facilitated by Aberdeen College. Pupils also attended Harlaw Academy and Aberdeen Grammar School for some Advanced Higher courses as part of the City Campus programme.

== History ==
Kincorth Academy's coat of arms included several symbols, which represented various historical links. The towers indicated the city of Aberdeen and the portcullis was the link between Kincorth and Arbroath Abbey. Prior to 1527, the lands on which the school stands, belonged to the Abbey of Arbroath.

In 1551 these lands were passed into the hands of Thomas Menzies of Pitfodels, Provost of Aberdeen. The colours of the Menzies family are red and white and one of the branches of the family has an eagle in its arms. The significance of the eagle is further enhanced by the fact that Kincorth stands on the most easterly point of the Grampians, an area inhabited by the eagle. The name Seann Coirthe is the Gaelic form of Kincorth.

Kincorth Academy opened on 19 August 1971 to serve the Kincorth area which had largely developed in the late 1940s and 1950s. Kincorth Academy is a six-year, co-educational, non-denominational school.

Until 2005 the school had five houses, to which students were divided into, these were: Braemar, Crathes, Dunnotar, Glamis & Stirling (all named after Scottish castles). Due to the falling school roll, Crathes house was retired and pupils were re-distributed across the remaining 4 houses.

In 2010, due to restructuring within the school (and across Aberdeen City Council schools), all houses were retired and organised into 3 larger houses (still named after Scottish castles): Craigievar, Edinburgh & Fyvie.

After 47 years, Kincorth Academy was closed on 4 July 2018. Torry Academy closed around the same time, before they were eventually demolished. Both schools were replaced with the newly built £47 million Lochside Academy, in Altens. The site is set to be developed as housing, which will also see the loss of floodlit netball and tennis courts.

== Former Pupils ==
- Andrew Shinnie (1989- ), Scottish international footballer
- Graeme Shinnie (1991- ), Scottish international footballer
