= Torry Academy =

Former secondary school in Aberdeen, Scotland

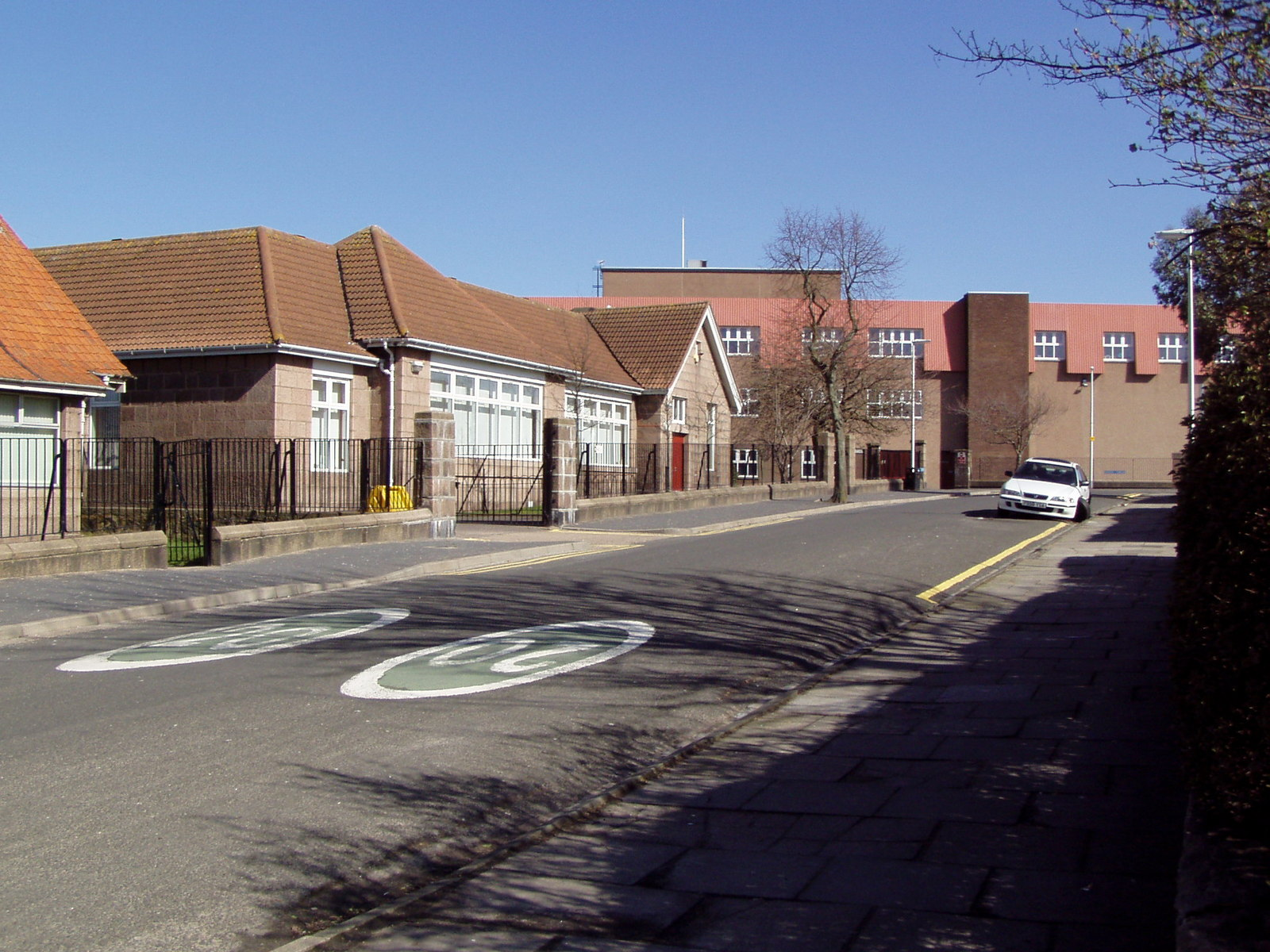
- Torry Academy, with the original school building on the left and the 1970s extension on the right.

Location
- Tullos Circle; Aberdeen, AB11 8HD; Scotland; 57.1336°N 2.0847°W

Information
- Type: Secondary school
- Established: 1927
- Closed: July 6, 2018
- Local authority: Aberdeen City Council
- Gender: Co-educational
- Age: 11 to 18
- School years: S1-S6
- Website: Torry Academy

Torry Academy was a secondary school in Torry, Aberdeen, run by Aberdeen City Council. The original school was built in 1927 and added to in 1947, creating the granite part of the school building. The school was extended in the late 1970s on the site of The Moundie to create an additional 3-storey block. Torry Academy was closed on July 6, 2018, prior to the opening of the new £47 million Lochside Academy in Altens. It closed around the same time as Kincorth Academy. Both schools were replaced by Lochside Academy. After almost 3 years, demolition work began in April 2021, before being finished in September.
