= List of acts of the Parliament of Victoria from 1995 =

This is a list of acts of the Parliament of Victoria, Australia for the year 1995.

== 1995 ==
Short title, or popular name	Citation	Royal assent
Long title
Fire Authorities (Miscellaneous Amendments) Act 1995 (repealed)	No. 2 of 1995	
(Repealed by Statute Law Revision Act 2000 (No. 74 of 2000))
Sports Drug Testing Act 1995 (repealed)	No. 3 of 1995	15 March 1995
An Act to enable the Australian Sports Drug Agency to carry out sports drug testing on State competitors, to confer related functions and powers on the Agency and for other purposes. (Repealed by Sports Anti-doping Act 2005 (No. 70 of 2005))
Office of the Regulator-General (Amendment) Act 1995 (repealed)	No. 5 of 1995	
(Repealed by Statute Law Revision Act 2000 (No. 74 of 2000))
Public Sector Management (Amendment) Act 1995	No. 6 of 1995	28 March 1995
An Act to amend the Public Sector Management Act 1992 (Note: Public Sector Management Act 1992 (No. 68 of 1992)) to improve the administration of that Act and for other purposes.
Road Safety (Amendment) Act 1995 (repealed)	No. 7 of 1995	
(Repealed by Legislation Reform (Repeals No. 3) Act 2008 (No. 53 of 2008))
Coastal Management Act 1995 (repealed)	No. 8 of 1995	26 April 1995
An Act to establish a Victorian Coastal and Bay Management Council, to provide for the establishment of Regional Coastal Boards, to provide for co-ordinated strategic planning and management for the Victorian coast and a co-ordinated approach to approvals for the use and development of coastal Crown land and for other purposes. (Repealed by Marine and Coastal Act 2018 (No. 26 of 2018))
Statute Law Revision Act 1995 (repealed)	No. 11 of 1995	26 April 1995
An Act to revise the Statute Law of Victoria and for other purposes. (Repealed by Statute Law Revision Act 2000 (No. 74 of 2000))
Associations Incorporation (Amendment) Act 1995 (repealed)	No. 14 of 1995	9 May 1995
An Act to make minor amendments to the Associations Incorporation Act 1981. (Note: Associations Incorporation Act 1981 (No. 9713)) (Repealed by Statute Law Revision Act 2000 (No. 74 of 2000))
Australian Food Industry Science Centre Act 1995	No. 18 of 1995	16 May 1995
An Act to establish the Australian Food Industry Science Centre and for other purposes.
Judicial Remuneration Tribunal Act 1995 (repealed)	No. 22 of 1995	16 May 1995
An Act to establish a tribunal in relation to the salary and allowances of Judges of the Supreme Court, Judges of the County Court, Magistrates and the holders of certain other offices, to amend the Constitution Act 1975, (Note: Constitution Act 1975 (No. 8750)) the Supreme Court Act 1986, (Note: Supreme Court Act 1986 (No. 110 of 1986)) the County Court Act 1958, (Note: County Court Act 1958 (No. 6230)) the Magistrates' Court Act 1989 (Note: Magistrates' Court Act 1989 (No. 51 of 1989)) and certain other Acts and for other purposes. (Repealed by Judicial Entitlements Act 2015 (No. 29 of 2015))
Ports Acts (Amendment) Act 1995 (repealed)	No. 23 of 1995	16 May 1995
An Act to amend the Port of Melbourne Authority Act 1958, (Note: Melbourne Harbor Trust Act 1958 (No. 6312)) the Port of Geelong Authority Act 1958, (Note: Geelong Harbor Trust Act 1958 (No. 6262)) the Port of Portland Authority Act 1958, (Note: Portland Harbor Trust Act 1958 (No. 6340)) the Crown Land (Reserves) Act 1978 (Note: Crown Land (Reserves) Act 1978 (No. 9212)) and the Marine Act 1988 (Note: Marine Act 1988 (No. 52 of 1988)) and for other purposes. (Repealed by Statute Law Revision Act 2000 (No. 74 of 2000))
Appropriation (Parliament) (Interim 1995-96) Act 1995 (repealed)	No. 28 of 1995	6 June 1995
An Act to make interim appropriation of moneys out of the Consolidated Fund for recurrent services and for certain works and purposes for the Parliament for the period July to October 1995. (Repealed by Statute Law Revision Act 2000 (No. 74 of 2000))
Gas and Fuel Corporation (Repeal) Act 1995 (repealed)	No. 31 of 1995	6 June 1995
An Act to provide for the winding up of the Gas and Fuel Corporation of Victoria, to repeal the Gas and Fuel Corporation Act 1958, (Note: Gas and Fuel Corporation Act 1958 (No. 6260)) to amend the State Electricity Commission Act 1958 (Note: State Electricity Commission Act 1958 (No. 6377)) and for other purposes. (Repealed by Treasury Legislation (Repeal) Act 2005 (No. 73 of 2005))
Melbourne and Olympic Parks (Amendment) Act 1995 (repealed)	No. 34 of 1995	6 June 1995
An Act to amend the National Tennis Centre Act 1985 (Note: National Tennis Centre Act 1985 (No. 10206)) to change the title of that Act to the Melbourne and Olympic Parks Act 1985, to replace the National Tennis Centre Trust with the Melbourne and Olympic Parks Trust, to make provision for the administration of Olympic Park and further provision for the administration of the National Tennis Centre, to amend the Melbourne Cricket Ground Act 1933 (Note: Melbourne Cricket Ground Act 1933 (No. 4149)) to make further provision for the appointment of deputies as trustees and other matters, to amend the Melbourne Cricket Ground Act 1984 (Note: Melbourne Cricket Ground Act 1984 (No. 10039)) and for other purposes. (Repealed by Statute Law Repeals Act 2012 (No. 30 of 2012))
Royal Botanic Gardens and Victorian Conservation Trust (Amendment) Act 1995	No. 38 of 1995	6 June 1995
An Act to amend the Royal Botanic Gardens Act 1991, (Note: Royal Botanic Gardens Act 1991 (No. 87 of 1991)) to amend the Victorian Conservation Trust Act 1972, (Note: Victorian Conservation Trust Act 1972 (No. 8350)) to make various amendments to other Acts and for other purposes.
Australian Grand Prix (Amendment) Act 1995	No. 39 of 1995	14 June 1995
An Act to amend the Australian Grand Prix Act 1994 (Note: Australian Grand Prix Act 1994 (No. 68 of 1994)) and for other purposes.
Consumer Credit (Victoria) Act 1995	No. 41 of 1995	14 June 1995
An Act to regulate the provision of consumer credit, to amend the Credit (Administration) Act 1984 (Note: Credit (Administration) Act 1984 (No. 10091)) and the Credit Act 1984 (Note: Credit Act 1984 (No. 10097)) and for other purposes.
Equal Opportunity Act 1995	No. 42 of 1995	14 June 1995
An Act to re-enact and extend the law relating to equal opportunity and discrimination, to repeal the Equal Opportunity Act 1984, (Note: Equal Opportunity Act 1984 (No. 10095)) to make consequential amendments to other Acts and for other purposes.
Grain Handling and Storage Act 1995	No. 45 of 1995	14 June 1995
An Act to make further provision for regulating the handling and storage of grain, to repeal the Grain Elevators Board Act 1958 (Note: Grain Elevators Act 1958 (No. 6266)) and for other purposes.
Plant Health and Plant Products Act 1995 (repealed)	No. 51 of 1995	14 June 1995
An Act to provide for plant pest and disease control and plant product description, to amend the Agricultural Industry Development Act 1990 to provide for industry funded control measures and compensation schemes, to repeal the Fruit and Vegetables Act 1958, (Note: Fruit and Vegetables Act 1958 (No. 6256)) the Seeds Act 1982 (Note: Seeds Act 1982 (No. 9775)) and the Vegetation and Vine Diseases Act 1958 (Note: Vegetation and Vine Diseases Act 1958 (No. 6407)) and for other purposes. (Repealed by Plant Biosecurity Act 2010 (No. 60 of 2010))
Appropriation (Interim 1995-96) Act 1995 (repealed)	No. 54 of 1995	20 June 1995
An Act to make interim appropriation of moneys out of the Consolidated Fund for recurrent services and for certain works and purposes for the period July to October 1995. (Repealed by Statute Law Revision Act 2000 (No. 74 of 2000))
Business Franchise (Tobacco) (Amendment) Act 1995	No. 55 of 1995	20 June 1995
An Act to amend the Business Franchise (Tobacco) Act 1974 (Note: Business Franchise (Tobacco) Act 1974 (No. 8597)) and for other purposes.
Trade Measurement Act 1995	No. 59 of 1995	20 June 1995
An Act relating to trade measurement in Victoria as part of the scheme for uniform trade measurement legislation throughout Australia and for other purposes.
Trade Measurement (Administration) Act 1995	No. 60 of 1995	20 June 1995
An Act relating to the administration of the Trade Measurement Act 1995, (Note: Trade Measurement Act 1995 (No. 59 of 1995)) to repeal the Weights and Measures Act 1958, (Note: Weights and Measures Act 1958 (No. 6414)) to amend certain Acts and for other purposes.
Infertility Treatment Act 1995	No. 63 of 1995	27 June 1995
An Act to regulate procedures for the treatment of infertility and research using human reproductive material, to make provisions with respect to surrogacy agreements, to repeal the Infertility (Medical Procedures) Act 1984 (Note: Infertility (Medical Procedures) Act 1984 (No. 10163)) and to amend various other Acts and for other purposes.
Public Transport Competition Act 1995 renamed Bus Services Act 1995	No. 68 of 1995	17 October 1995
An Act to improve the operation of road-based public transport by providing for the accreditation of operators and implementing a system of service contracts for certain types of transport service, to amend the Transport Act 1983 (Note: Transport Act 1983 (No. 9921)) and for other purposes.
Building (Amendment) Act 1995	No. 71 of 1995	31 October 1995
An Act to amend the Building Act 1993 (Note: Building Act 1993 (No. 126 of 1993)) and for other purposes.
Appropriation (1995-96, No. 1) Act 1995	No. 72 of 1995	31 October 1995
An Act to appropriate certain sums out of the Consolidated Fund for recurrent services and for certain works and services for the financial year 1995-96 and to appropriate the supplies granted for recurrent services and for certain works and services under the Appropriation (Interim 1995-96) Act 1995 (Note: Appropriation (Interim 1995-96) Act 1995 (No. 54 of 1995)) and for other purposes.
Appropriation (Parliament 1995-96, No. 1) Act 1995	No. 73 of 1995	31 October 1995
An Act to appropriate moneys out of the Consolidated Fund for recurrent services and for certain works and services for the Parliament for the financial year 1995-96 and to appropriate the supplies granted for recurrent services and for certain works and services under the Appropriation (Parliament) (Interim 1995-96) Act 1995 (Note: Appropriation (Parliament) (Interim 1995-96) Act 1995 (No. 28 of 1995)) and for other purposes.
Competition Policy Reform (Victoria) Act 1995	No. 74 of 1995	14 November 1995
An Act to apply certain laws of the Commonwealth relating to competition policy as laws of Victoria and for other purposes.
Gas Industry (Extension of Supply) Act 1995 (repealed)	No. 80 of 1995	28 November 1995
An Act to amend the Gas Industry Act 1994 (Note: Gas Industry Act 1994 (No. 112 of 1994)) and for other purposes. (Repealed by Statute Law Revision Act 2000 (No. 74 of 2000))
Marcus Oldham College Act 1995	No. 81 of 1995	28 November 1995
An Act to provide for the transfer of certain trust property to Marcus Oldham College A.C.N. 071 444 409, to cancel the trust created by the will of Marcus William Oldham, deceased, and for other purposes.
Port Services Act 1995 or the Port Management Act 1995	No. 82 of 1995	28 November 1995
An Act to make further provision relating to ports, to amend the Port of Melbourne Authority Act 1958, the Port of Geelong Authority Act 1958, the Port of Portland Authority Act 1958, the Marine Act 1988 and certain other Acts and for other purposes.
Racing (Amendment) Act 1995	No. 83 of 1995	28 November 1995
An Act to amend the Racing Act 1958 (Note: Racing Act 1958 (No. 6353)) to make further provision for the regulation of the greyhound racing industry and for other purposes.
Road Transport (Dangerous Goods) Act 1995	No. 84 of 1995	28 November 1995
An Act to make provision for safety in the transport of dangerous goods by road as part of the system of nationally consistent road transport laws and for other purposes.
Vocational Education and Training (Amendment) Act 1995 (repealed)	No. 85 of 1995	28 November 1995
An Act to amend the Vocational Education and Training Act 1990 (Note: Vocational Education and Training Act 1990 (No. 45 of 1990)) to enable certain powers and functions of the State Training Board in relation to apprenticeships and traineeships to be carried out by persons or bodies approved by the Governor in Council and for other purposes. (Repealed by Statute Law Revision Act 2000 (No. 74 of 2000))
Australian Grand Prix (Further Amendment) Act 1995 (repealed)	No. 87 of 1995	5 December 1995
An Act to amend the Australian Grand Prix Act 1994 and for other purposes. (Repealed by Statute Law Revision Act 2000 (No. 74 of 2000))
Carlton (Recreation Ground) Land (Amendment) Act 1995 (repealed)	No. 88 of 1995	5 December 1995
An Act to amend the Carlton (Recreation Ground) Land Act 1966 (Note: Carlton (Recreation Ground) Land Act 1966 (No. 7412)) and for other purposes. (Repealed by Statute Law Revision Act 2000 (No. 74 of 2000))
Casino (Management Agreement) (Further Amendment) Act 1995 (repealed)	No. 89 of 1995	
(Repealed by Statute Law Revision Act 2000 (No. 74 of 2000))
Zoological Parks and Gardens Act 1995	No. 106 of 1995	5 December 1995
An Act to establish the Zoological Parks and Gardens Board and define its functions, to provide for the management and administration of zoological parks and gardens, to repeal the Zoological Parks and Gardens Act 1967, (Note: Zoological Gardens Act 1967 (No. 7518)) to amend the Borrowing and Investment Powers Act 1987 (Note: Borrowing and Investment Powers Act 1987 (No. 13 of 1987)) and the Conservation, Forests and Lands Act 1987, (Note: Conservation, Forests and Lands Act 1987 (No. 41 of 1987)) to make consequential amendments to other Acts and for other purposes.
Domestic Building Contracts and Tribunal Act 1995 or the Domestic Building Contracts Act 1995	No. 91 of 1995	5 December 1995
An Act to regulate domestic building contracts and to establish a Domestic Building Disputes Tribunal and to amend the House Contracts Guarantee Act 1987 (Note: House Contracts Guarantee Act 1987 (No. 44 of 1987)) and the Building Act 1993 and for other purposes.
Fisheries Act 1995	No. 92 of 1995	5 December 1995
An Act to reform the law relating to Victorian fisheries, to repeal the Fisheries Act 1968 (Note: Fisheries Act 1968 (No. 7780)) and to make consequential amendments to certain other Acts and for other purposes.
Heritage Act 1995 (repealed)	No. 93 of 1995	5 December 1995
An Act to provide a framework for heritage protection and conservation in Victoria, to repeal the Historic Buildings Act 1981 (Note: Historic Buildings Act 1981 (No. 9667)) and the Historic Shipwrecks Act 1981 (Note: Historic Shipwrecks Act 1981 (No. 9722)) and to amend the Archaeological and Aboriginal Relics Preservation Act 1972 (Note: Archaeological and Aboriginal Relics Preservation Act 1972 (No. 8273)) and other Acts and for other purposes. (Repealed by Heritage Act 2017 (No. 7 of 2017))
Constitution Act Amendment (Amendment) Act 1995 (repealed)	No. 103 of 1995	5 December 1995
An Act to amend The Constitution Act Amendment Act 1958 (Note: Constitution Act Amendment Act 1958 (No. 6224)) and for other purposes. (Repealed by Statute Law Revision Act 2000 (No. 74 of 2000))
Melbourne City Link Act 1995	No. 107 of 1995	12 December 1995
An Act to ratify the Agreement for the Melbourne City Link Project, to make further provision for the Melbourne City Link Project, to amend the Melbourne City Link Authority Act 1994 (Note: Melbourne City Link Authority Act 1994 (No. 116 of 1994)) and certain other Acts and for other purposes.
Children and Young Persons (Pre-hearing Conferences) Act 1995 (repealed)	No. 40 of 1995	
(Repealed by Statute Law Revision Act 2000 (No. 74 of 2000))
Classification (Publications, Films and Computer Games) (Enforcement) Act 1995	No. X of 1995	
Coroners (Amendment) Act 1995	No. X of 1995	
Corporations (Victoria) (Amendment) Act 1995 (repealed)	No. 12 of 1995	
(Repealed by Statute Law Revision Act 2000 (No. 74 of 2000))
Courts (General Amendment) Act 1995	No. X of 1995	
Dangerous Goods (Amendment) Act 1995 (repealed)	No. 78 of 1995	
(Repealed by Statute Law Revision Act 2000 (No. 74 of 2000))
Defence Reserves Re-Employment Act 1995	No. X of 1995	
Dental Technicians (Amendment) Act 1995 (repealed)	No. 15 of 1995	
(Repealed by Statute Law Revision Act 2000 (No. 74 of 2000))
Drugs, Poisons and Controlled Substances (Amendment) Act 1995 (repealed)	No. 66 of 1995	
(Repealed by Statute Law Revision Act 2000 (No. 74 of 2000))
Electricity Industry (Amendment) Act 1995	No. X of 1995	
Electricity Industry (Electricity Corporations) Act 1995 (repealed)	No. 29 of 1995	
(Repealed by Statute Law Revision Act 2000 (No. 74 of 2000))
Electricity Industry (Further Amendment) Act 1995	No. X of 1995	
Extractive Industries Development Act 1995	No. X of 1995	
Financial Institutions (Victoria) (Amendment) Act 1995 (repealed)	No. 19 of 1995	
(Repealed by Statute Law Revision Act 2000 (No. 74 of 2000))
Financial Institutions Duty (Amendment) Act 1995 (repealed)	No. 30 of 1995	
(Repealed by Statute Law Revision Act 2000 (No. 74 of 2000))
Financial Management and Audit Acts (Amendment) Act 1995	No. X of 1995	
Food (Amendment) Act 1995 (repealed)	No. 20 of 1995	
(Repealed by Statute Law Revision Act 2000 (No. 74 of 2000))
Gaming Acts (Amendment) Act 1995 (repealed)	No. 44 of 1995	
(Repealed by Statute Law Revision Act 2000 (No. 74 of 2000))
Government Employee Housing Authority (Amendment) Act 1995	No. X of 1995	
Government Employee Housing Authority (Repeal) Act 1995	No. X of 1995	
Health Acts (Amendment) Act 1995 (repealed)	No. 21 of 1995	
(Repealed by Legislation Reform (Repeals No. 1) Act 2008 (No. 10 of 2008))
Health Services (Metropolitan Hospitals) Act 1995 (repealed)	No. 46 of 1995	
(Repealed by Statute Law Revision Act 2000 (No. 74 of 2000))
Land (Miscellaneous) Act 1995	No. X of 1995	
Land (Revocation of Reservations) Act 1995	No. X of 1995	
Land Revocations (And Other Matters) Act 1995	No. X of 1995	
Latrobe Regional Commission (Repeal) Act 1995	No. X of 1995	
Legal Aid Commission (Amendment) Act 1995 (repealed)	No. 48 of 1995	
(Repealed by Legislation Reform (Repeals No. 2) Act 2008 (No. 16 of 2008))
Legal Profession Practice (Amendment) Act 1995	No. X of 1995	
Liquor Control (Further Amendment) Act 1995	No. X of 1995	
Liquor Control (Licences and Permits) Act 1995	No. X of 1995	
Local Government (Elections) Act 1995	No. X of 1995	
Local Government (Further Amendment) Act 1995	No. X of 1995	
Medical Practice and Nurses Acts (Amendment) Act 1995 (repealed)	No. 49 of 1995	
(Repealed by Statute Law Revision Act 2000 (No. 74 of 2000))
Mental Health (Amendment) Act 1995	No. X of 1995	
Mildura College Lands (Amendment) Act 1995	No. X of 1995	
Miscellaneous Acts (Health and Justice) Amendment Act 1995	No. X of 1995	
Miscellaneous Acts (Omnibus Amendments) Act 1995 (repealed)	No. 100 of 1995	
(Repealed by Legislation Reform (Repeals No. 2) Act 2008 (No. 16 of 2008))
National Environment Protection Council (Victoria) Act 1995	No. X of 1995	
National Parks (Yarra Ranges and Other Amendments) Act 1995	No. X of 1995	
Planning and Environment (Development Contributions) Act 1995 (repealed)	No. 50 of 1995	
(Repealed by Statute Law Revision Act 2000 (No. 74 of 2000))
Planning and Environment (Miscellaneous Amendments) Act 1995 (repealed)	No. 35 of 1995	
(Repealed by Statute Law Revision Act 2000 (No. 74 of 2000))
Prevention of Cruelty to Animals (Amendment) Act 1995 (repealed)	No. 77 of 1995	
(Repealed by Statute Law Revision Act 2000 (No. 74 of 2000))
Public Prosecutions (Amendment) Act 1995 (repealed)	No. 36 of 1995	
(Repealed by Legislation Reform (Repeals No. 3) Act 2008 (No. 53 of 2008))
Retail Tenancies (Amendment) Act 1995 (repealed)	No. 37 of 1995	
(Repealed by Statute Law Repeals Act 2012 (No. 30 of 2012))
Road Safety (Miscellaneous Amendments) Act 1995 (repealed)	No. 58 of 1995	
(Repealed by Legislation Reform (Repeals No. 2) Act 2008 (No. 16 of 2008))
Road Transport Charges (Victoria) Act 1995	No. X of 1995	
Stamps (Amendment) Act 1995	No. X of 1995	
Stamps (Further Amendment) Act 1995	No. X of 1995	
State Deficit Levy (Repeal) Act 1995 (repealed)	No. 53 of 1995	
(Repealed by Treasury Legislation (Repeal) Act 2005 (No. 73 of 2005))
State Taxation (Further Amendment) Act 1995	No. X of 1995	
Superannuation Acts (General Amendment) Act 1995	No. X of 1995	
Superannuation Acts (Miscellaneous Amendments) Act 1995	No. X of 1995	
Transport (Tow Truck Reform) Act 1995 (repealed)	No. 17 of 1995	
(Repealed by Statute Law Revision Act 2000 (No. 74 of 2000))
Treasury Corporation of Victoria (Amendment) Act 1995	No. X of 1995	
Treasury Corporation of Victoria (Housing Finance) Act 1995 (repealed)	No. 61 of 1995	
(Repealed by Treasury Legislation (Repeal) Act 2005 (No. 73 of 2005))
Trustee and Trustee Companies (Amendment) Act 1995 (repealed)	No. 104 of 1995	
(Repealed by Statute Law Revision Act 2000 (No. 74 of 2000))
University Acts (Further Amendment) Act 1995	No. X of 1995	
Valuation of Land (Further Amendment) Act 1995 (repealed)	No. 105 of 1995	
(Repealed by Statute Law Revision Act 2000 (No. 74 of 2000))
Victorian Arts Centre (Amendment) Act 1995 (repealed)	No. 4 of 1995	
(Repealed by Statute Law Revision Act 2000 (No. 74 of 2000))
Water (Amendment) Act 1995	No. X of 1995	
Water (Further Amendment) Act 1995	No. X of 1995	
Water Industry (Amendment) Act 1995 (repealed)	No. 65 of 1995	
(Repealed by Legislation Reform (Repeals No. 2) Act 2008 (No. 16 of 2008))

== Sources ==
- "1995 Victorian Historical Acts". AustLII.
