= Lochside Academy =

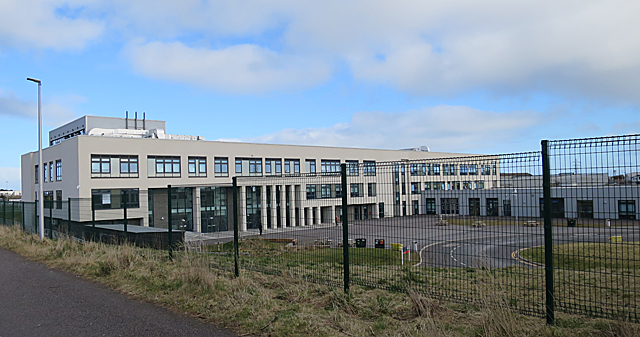
- The exterior of the school in March 2020.

Location
- Wellington Circle; Altens, Aberdeen, AB12 3JG; Scotland; 57.1113°N 2.0994°W

Information
- Type: Secondary school
- Established: 23 August 2018
- Local authority: Aberdeen City Council
- Head teacher: Justin Noon
- Staff: 103
- Gender: Co-educational
- Age: 11 to 18
- Enrollment: 1,580
- Capacity: 1,350
- Colours: Red, white and grey
- School years: S1-S6
- Website: Lochside Academy

Lochside Academy is a co-educational secondary school in Altens, Aberdeen, run by Aberdeen City Council. Its feeder primary schools are Abbotswell School, Charleston School, Kirkhill School, Loirston School, Tullos School, and Greyhope School (formerly Walker Road School). It serves secondary age pupils in the Cove Bay, Kincorth, Torry, and Nigg areas of Aberdeen. It opened in August 2018, at the start of the new school year.

== History ==
The £47 million Lochside Academy was built on the site of Calder Park at Redmoss as a replacement for secondary schools in Torry and Kincorth, which both closed in July 2018. Lochside's catchment area covers all pupils that would have previously attended those schools. The school building contains a swimming pool, dance studio, sports pitches, games halls and a library. The first headteacher was Mr Neil Hendry, who stepped down from being headteacher at Northfield Academy to take up the headteacher post at Lochside. Prior to the school's opening, pupils and members of the local community were asked to name the new school. Potential names for the academy were Wellington, Altens, Redmoss, Calder, and Lochside. Lochside won a landslide victory with 923 votes, receiving twice as many votes as Altens, the name in second place.

== Headteachers ==
| Name | Incumbency |
|---|---|
| Neil Hendry | 2018 - 2022 |
| Justin Noon | 2022–present |
