= Eastern Polytechnic =

University in Kenema, Sierra Leone

Coordinates: 7.8760°N 11.1822°W

Eastern technical University
- Type: Public
- Established: 2001
- Principal: Professor Mohamed T Lahai
- Administrative staff: 378
- Location: Kenema, Sierra Leone
- Campus: Kenema campus; Bunumbu campus, located in Bunumbu, Kailahun District; Woama campus, located in Woama, Kono District
- Affiliations: University of Sierra Leone

Eastern Technical University is a university located in Kenema, the third largest city of Sierra Leone, along with the Kenema campus, Eastern Technical University was designed as a multi-campus institution with a campus at Bunumbu in the Kailahun District, (this campus was destroyed in the Sierra Leone Civil War) another at Woama in the Kono District (this campus was planned after the war and two buildings were erected but the site has been abandoned). The college was established as a result of a merger of two prominent government institutions; the Bunumbu Teachers College and the Government Technical Institute. Both institutions had a long history of contribution towards education in Sierra Leone.

The Eastern Technical University acquired legal status as a tertiary educational institution in October 2001. Before then it had put quite a wide range of programmes in place, all geared towards providing educational opportunities to train as teachers, tradesmen, technicians and technologists.

== Current programmes ==
The school offer a number of programmes leading to a certificates, diploma or degree in English studies, engineering, business management, accounting, nursing, criminology carpentry, plumbing, electrician and much more.

The student number on the Kenema campus is 1,500. The institution employs more than 300 workers of which over 50% are trainers/lecturers while administrative and other service staff constitute the rest.

=== Degree programmes ===
- Bachelor's degree in Nursing
- Bachelor's degree in Business Management
- Bachelor's degree in Science
- Bachelor's degree in English Studies
- Bachelor's degree in Accounting
- Bachelor's degree in Criminology
- Bachelor's degree in Government
- Bachelor's degree in History
- Bachelor's degree in Geography
- Bachelor's degree in Economics

=== Certificate and diploma programmes ===
- Electrician
- Carpentry
- Plumbing
- Construction Work

==== Diploma programs ====
- Diploma in Computer Studies
- Diploma in Public Health
