= Kincorth =

Suburb of Aberdeen, Scotland

Coordinates: 57.1201°N 2.1101°W

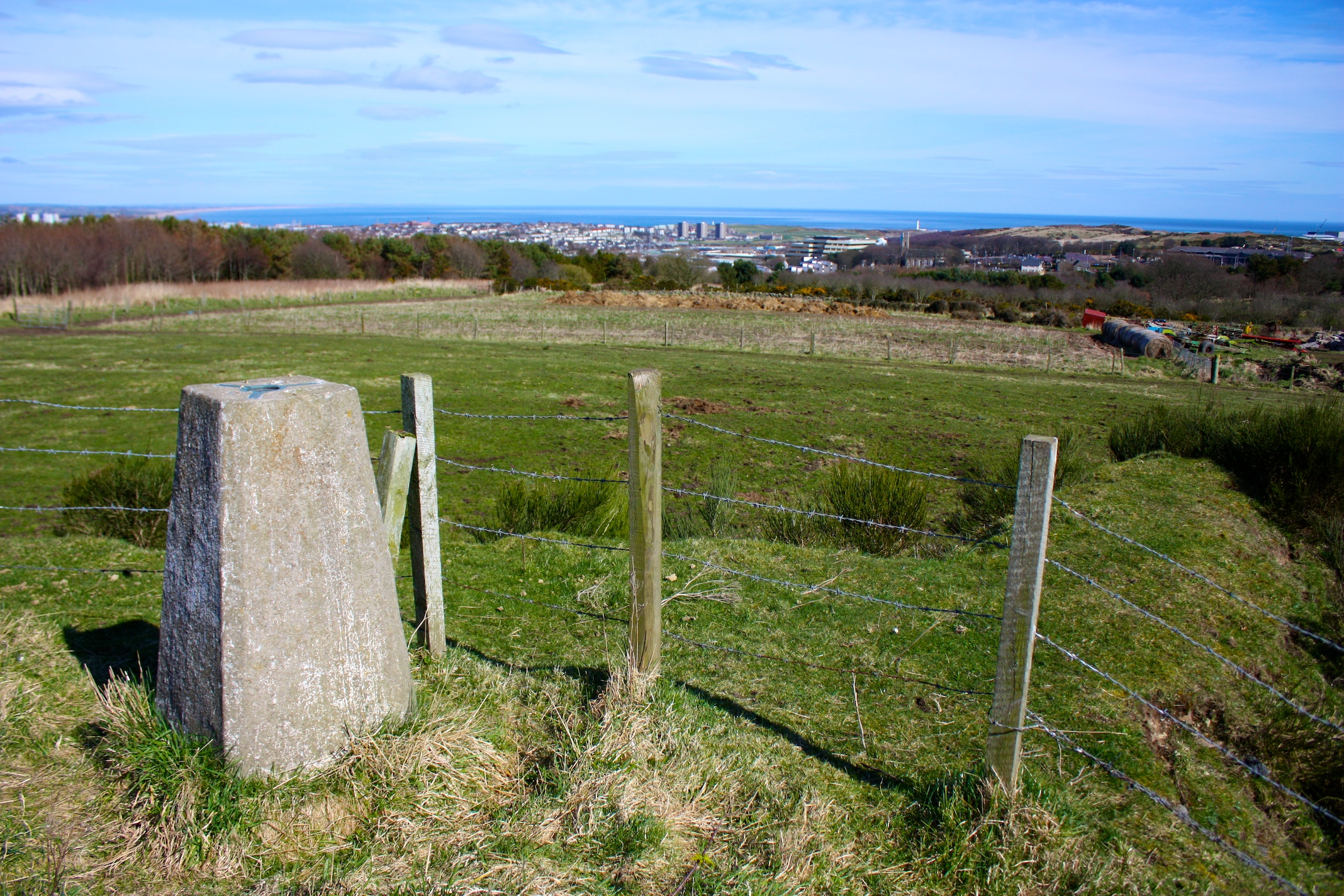
- Kincorth Hill Trig Point

- Location within the Aberdeen City council area Location within Scotland
- Council area: Aberdeen City
- Lieutenancy area: Aberdeen
- Country: Scotland
- Sovereign state: United Kingdom
- Postcode district: AB
- Police: Scotland
- Fire: Scottish
- Ambulance: Scottish

Kincorth is a suburb located to the south of Aberdeen, Scotland. The name is a corruption of the Scottish Gaelic "Ceann Coirthe", which probably refers to an old pillar or standing stone (coirthe). Kincorth is known as the garden estate of Aberdeen, and its plan originated in a competition launched in 1936 and won by Robert Gardner-Medwin, Denis Winston (who went on to become the University of Sydney's first Professor of Town Planning) and Clifford Holliday. It also has the Kincorth hill nature reserve known locally as the Gramps (Grampian mountains). The area is served by local high school Lochside Academy.
