= North East Scotland College =

Scottish further education institution

Coordinates: 57.152°N 2.100°W

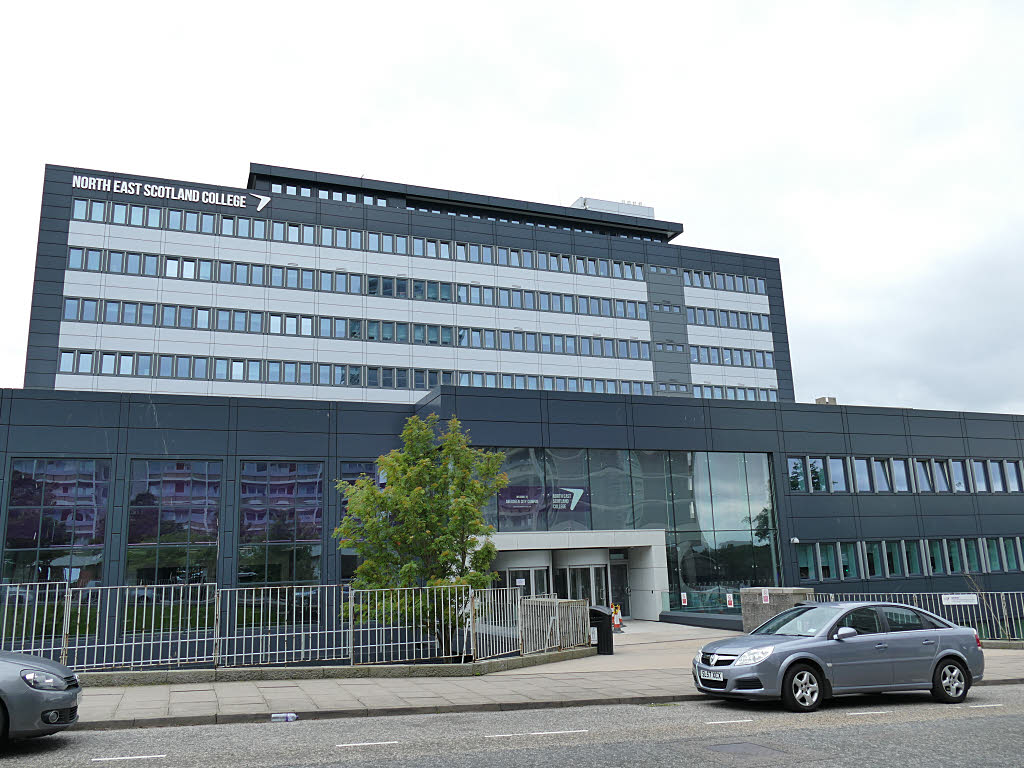
- Aberdeen campus in 2019
- Former names: Aberdeen College; Banff and Buchan College
- Type: Further Education
- Established: 1 November 2013
- Principal: Neil Cowie
- Students: 21,000
- Location: Aberdeen and Fraserburgh, Scotland

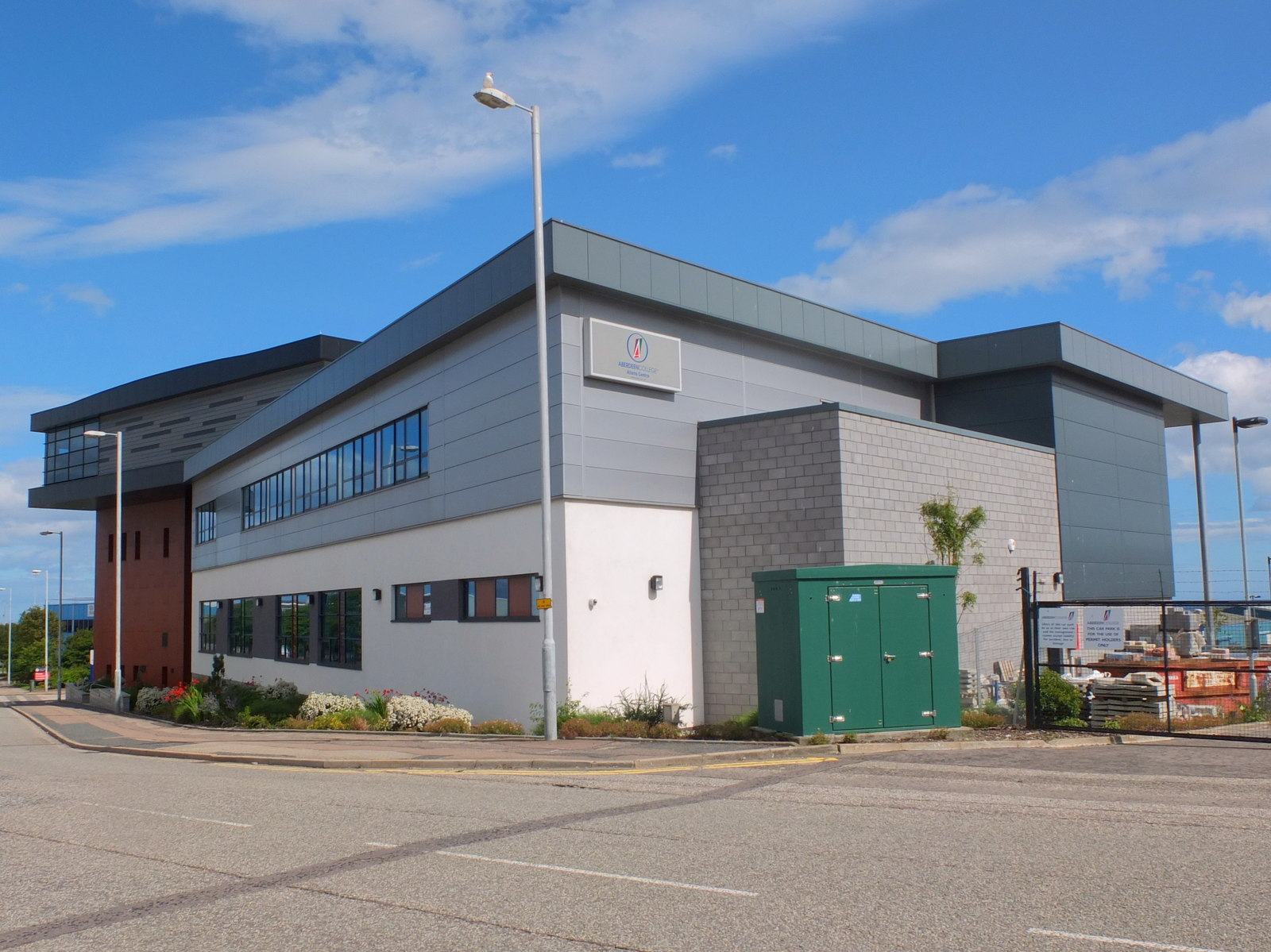
The Altens site in 2013

North East Scotland College (abbreviated as NESCol) is a further education college based in Scotland. It was formed on 1 November 2013 from the merger of Aberdeen College and Banff & Buchan College. The regional college serves an extensive geographical area with its main centres in Aberdeen and Fraserburgh.

The main NESCol campus – Aberdeen City Campus, is based at the Gallowgate in Aberdeen. The college has two other sites in and around Aberdeen - Aberdeen Altens and Aberdeen Clinterty. Outside of Aberdeen, it has a campus located in Fraserburgh and two learning centres in Ellon and Inverurie. It also operates the Scottish Maritime Academy in Peterhead.

The college also provides training in a number of community settings throughout Aberdeen City and Aberdeenshire.

North East Scotland College operates across three major subject areas: Engineering, Science and Technology; Creative Industries, Computing and Business Enterprise; and Service Industries. The college has over 7,000 full-time students and 14,000 part-time students.

== History ==
=== Aberdeen College ===
Aberdeen College was one of the largest further education colleges in Scotland. It was formed on 7 January 1991 from the amalgamation of the former Aberdeen Technical College, Aberdeen College of Commerce and Clinterty Agricultural College which were renamed the School of Science and Technology, the School of Arts and Business Studies and the School of Rural Studies respectively within the larger college. It merged with Banff and Buchan College to form North East Scotland College on 1 November 2013.
