= Belarusian State University of Agricultural Technology =

Public university in Minsk, Belarus

Coordinates: 53°55′38.3″N 27°37′21.2″E

The Belarusian State Agrarian Technical University (BSATU) is a non-profit public university in Minsk, Belarus.

Belarusian State Agrarian Technical University (the original name is Belarusian Institute of Mechanization and Electrification of Agriculture) was founded in October 1954. It started training specialists on Mechanization of Agriculture and Electrification of Agriculture.

In 1992 it became Belarusian Agrarian Technical University (The decree № 158 of the Council of Ministers of the Republic of Belarus signed on 25.03.1992). Since 2000, the university has been named as Educational Institution "Belarusian State Agrarian Technical University"(BSATU) by the approval of Minsk Executive Committee. In 2013 the university was awarded the Prize of the Government of the Republic of Belarus for achievements in the field of quality in 2012.

The structure of the university includes 6 faculties, 34 chairs, 27 departments and services.
