= Yaroslavl State Agrarian University =

Agricultural school in Yaroslavl, Russia

Yaroslavl State Agricultural Academy
- Russian: Ярославская государственная сельскохозяйственная академия
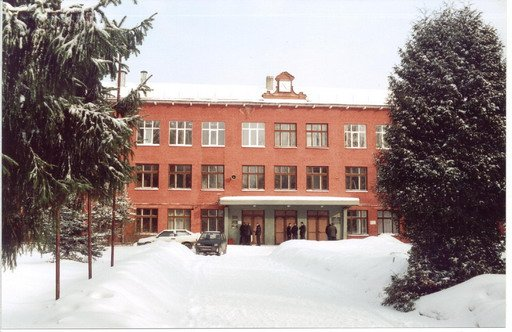
- Former name: Yaroslavl State Agricultural Institute
- Type: public
- Established: 1944, 1977
- Rector: Svetlana Gusar
- Students: 2400
- Location: 58 Tutaevskoe Highway, Yaroslavl, Russia; 57°40′55″N 39°49′53″E
- Campus: urban
- Website: www.yaragrovuz.ru

The Yaroslavl State Agricultural Academy (Yaroslavl SAA; Russian: Ярославская государственная сельскохозяйственная академия, ЯГСХА) is a public high educational institution in Yaroslavl, Russia. It trains specialists for agricultural industry, as well as dog handlers, veterinarians, and landscape designers.

From 2023 Yaroslavl State Agricultural Academy became Yaroslavl State Agrarian University.

== History ==
In March 1944, the Yaroslavl Agricultural Institute was established on the basis of the Yaroslavl Agricultural College. Initially, the Yaroslavl SAI was located in the building of the city school No. 43. The first students of the institute were boys and girls from the villages, as well as veterans of the Great Patriotic War.

In August 1957, the Yaroslavl Agricultural Institute was transferred to Voroshilov (now - Ussuriysk), Primorsky Krai. Many teachers and students from Yaroslavl went to the Far East too. Now it's the Primorskaya State Agricultural Academy.

In April 1977, a branch of the Moscow Timiryazev Agricultural Academy was established in Yaroslavl. In December 1990, it was transformed into an independent Yaroslavl Agricultural Institute. In 1995, the institute achieved the status of academy.

== Education ==
Today, in the academy the education process is organized at three departments:

- Faculty of Veterinary and Animal Science,
- Faculty of Agricultural Technology,
- Faculty of Engineering.
