= Marcus Oldham College =

Agricultural school in Geelong, Australia

- Type: Private
- Established: 1962
- Principal: Andrew Baker
- Location: Geelong, Victoria, Australia; 38°11′22″S 144°18′14″E
- Website: marcusoldham.vic.edu.au

Marcus Oldham College is an independent tertiary institution specializing in agribusiness and agriculture, located in Waurn Ponds, Geelong, Victoria. Established in 1962, it is Australia's only private agricultural college. The institution attracts enrolments from domestic and international students.

== History ==
The college was founded through a bequest from Marcus William Oldham, who died in 1939. In 1958, the Union Trustee Company convened a meeting with headmasters from several prominent schools to develop a plan for providing continuing education to school leavers pursuing farming careers. This led to the appointment of Ivo Dean as the first principal, who established foundational principles emphasizing practical experience and continuous assessment.

Significant milestones in the college's development include the introduction of the Equine Management program in 1979 and the launch of the Agribusiness course in 1992. In 2014, the college introduced the Master of Agribusiness program.

In 2022, Marcus Oldham College celebrated its 60th anniversary, marking six decades of contributions to agricultural education.

== Academic programs ==
=== Undergraduate ===
Marcus Oldham College offers the following undergraduate programs:

- Bachelor of Business (Agriculture)
- Bachelor of Business (Agribusiness)

These programs emphasises practical, industry-focused education, incorporating case studies, industry visits, and experiential learning.

=== Postgraduate ===
The college offers postgraduate studies in Agribusiness, including:

- Graduate Certificate of Agribusiness
- Graduate Diploma of Agribusiness
- Master of Agribusiness

These programs are designed for professionals seeking to enhance their leadership and strategic management skills in the agribusiness sector.

== Discontinuation of equine program ==
In 2024, the college announced the discontinuation of its Equine Management program due to declining enrolments and sustainability concerns. The final cohort was expected to complete their studies by the end of 2025.

== Centre for Professional Development ==
In May 2008, the college opened the Centre for the Study of Rural Australia on its campus. The centre focused on the intersection of agriculture and rural communities and aims to foster sustainable practices through community involvement.

The centre was renamed the Centre for the Study of Agribusiness (CSA) and in 2023 was re-launched as the Centre for Professional Development (CPD). The CPD will deliver webinars, podcasts and seminars that focus on relevant opportunities and challenges facing professionals in the agriculture and agribusiness sector. The CPD delivers short courses including the Marcus Oldham Rural Leadership program and is responsible for delivering the postgraduate program at the College.
