= Clinterty Agricultural College =

Former agricultural college in Aberdeen, Scotland

Clinterty Agricultural College was a small further education college near Aberdeen in Scotland, which became part of Aberdeen College (now North East Scotland College).

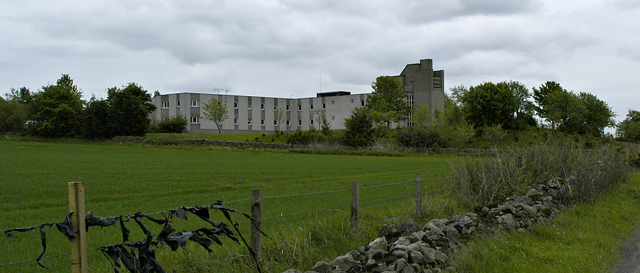
Clinterty – Main College Buildings

Clinterty College was founded in 1968 with the purchase of Meikle Clinterty farm and the following year Mains of Tertowie farm near the village of Blackburn in Aberdeenshire. Initially classes were taught in surplus school provision in Bucksburn and students ferried out to the farm at Meikle Clinterty for practical activities. The first principal of the college was John Telfer. John had originally travelled around Aberdeenshire running agricultural day release classes from the back of his Morris Minor Traveller and he was probably the most influential individual along with James Michie the Director of Education in Aberdeenshire, involved with the development of Clinterty. John Telfer died on 29 January 2025 at the age of 95.

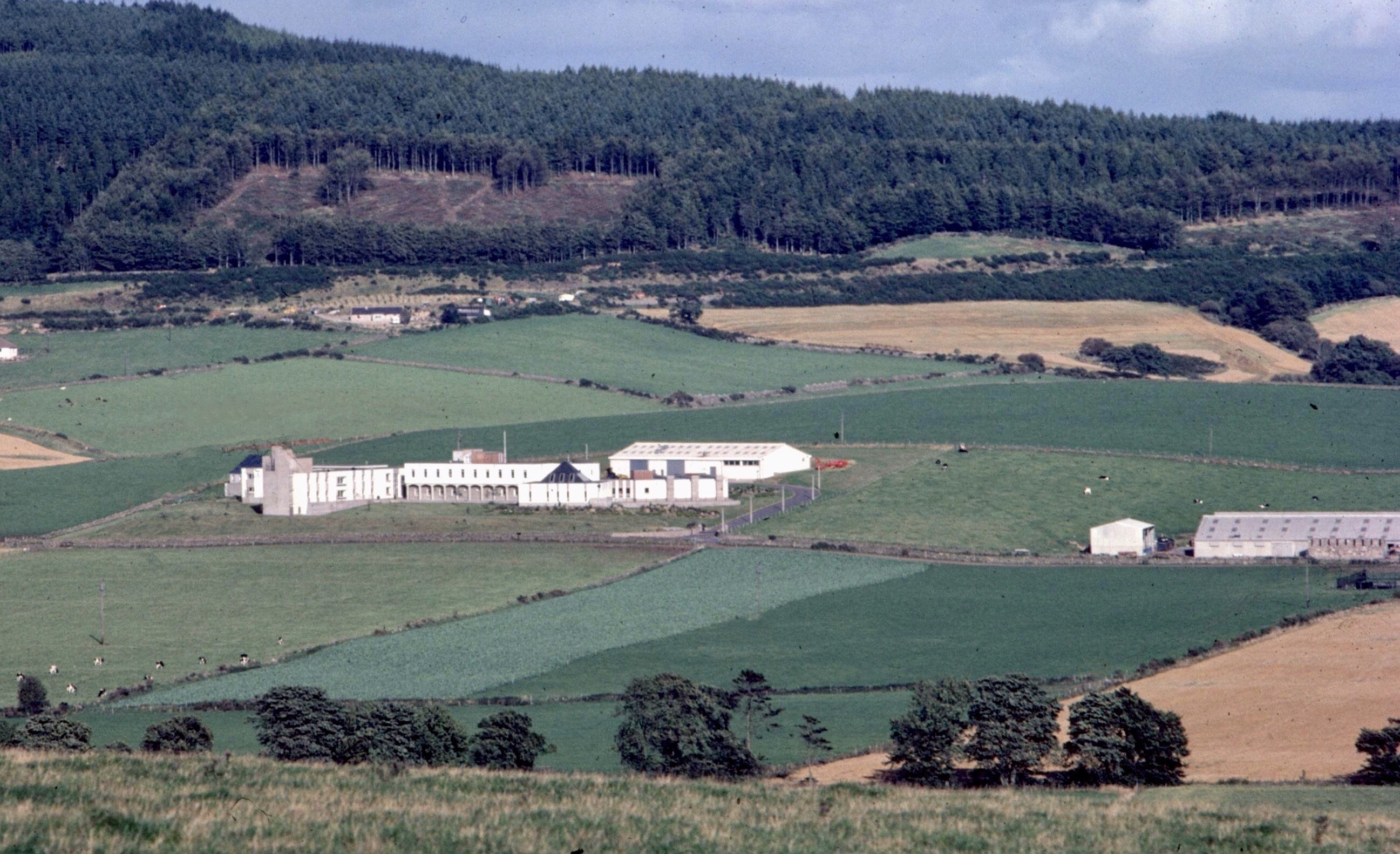
Early view of Clinterty Agricultural College

Construction of the new college started in 1973 on a green-field site near the village of Blackburn, and opened its doors to students in September 1975. The college provided training and education in Agricultural Skills, Crop & Animal Husbandry, Mechanisation and Agricultural & Construction Plant Engineering.

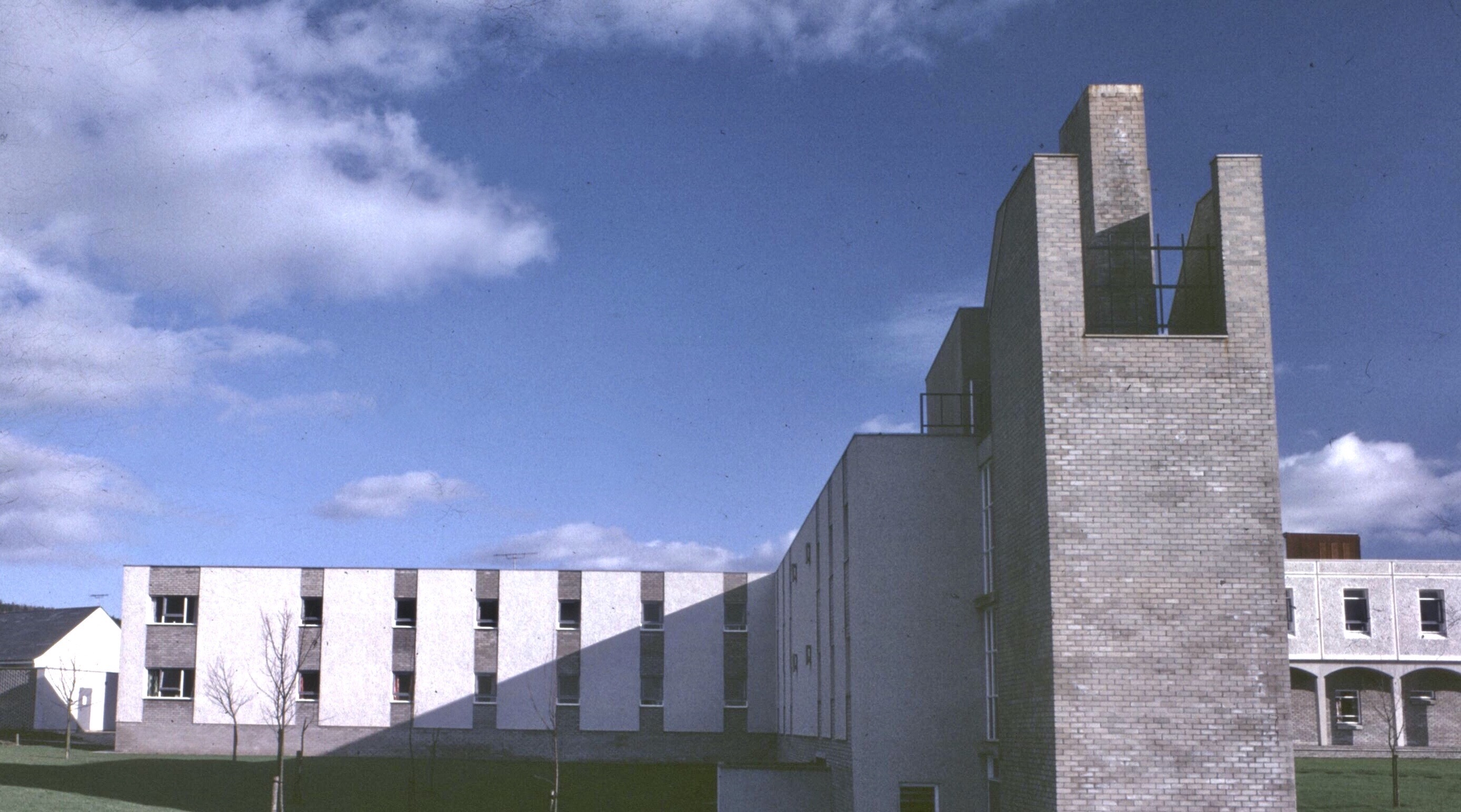
College hostel block

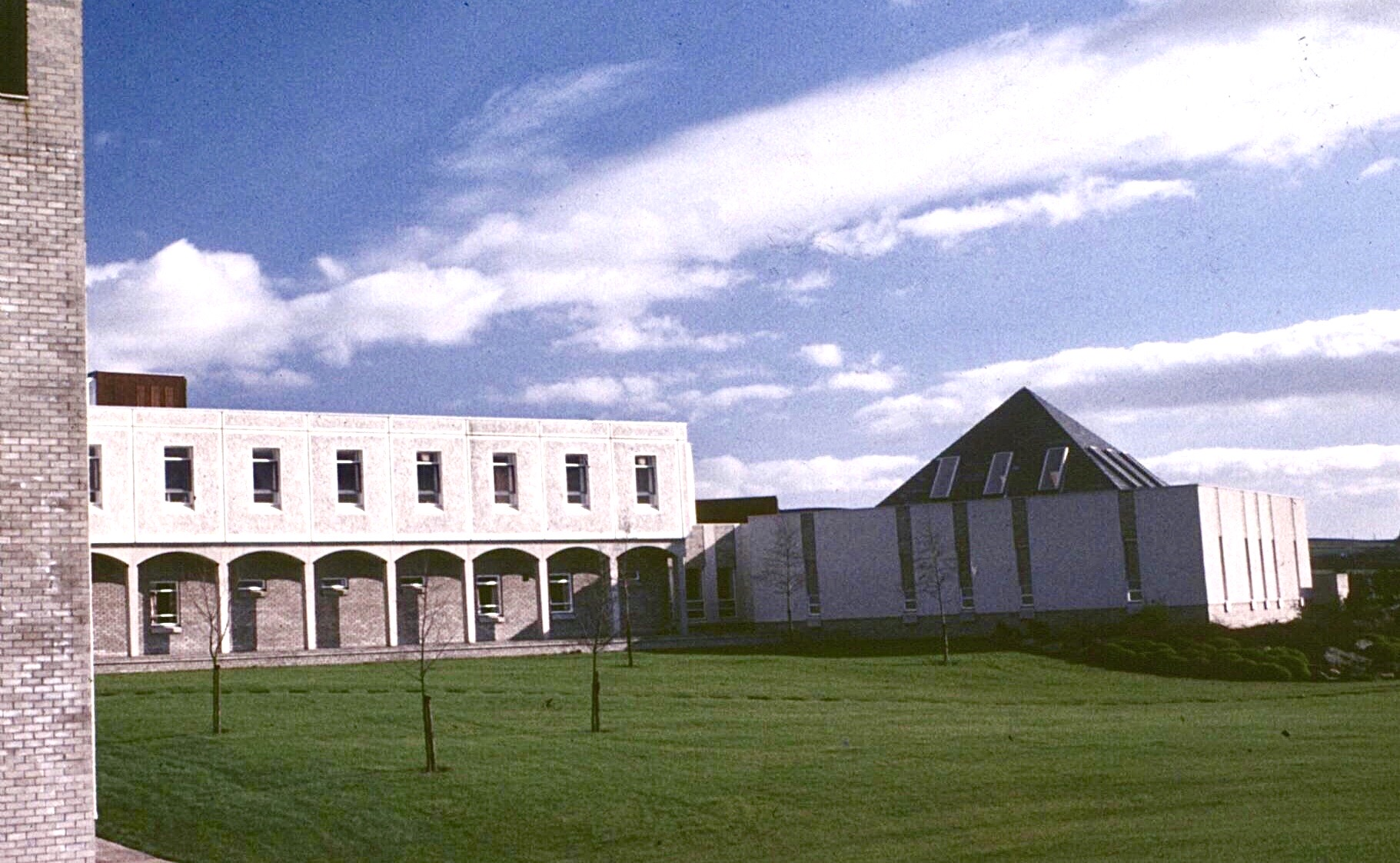
College teaching block and library.

The college developed with the appointment of a Vice Principal/ Farm Director Douglas Brown and Heads of Departments, Bill Beattie Engineering and Mechanisation and Ian Jackson Extra Mural. New college buildings including teaching block, engineering workshop and hostel were complete in 1975. New innovative courses in Recreation and Tourism, Outdoor Pursuits, Horticulture, Arboriculture, Equine Studies and Small Animal Care were introduced during the 1980s.

The college had three distinct farm units: Meikle Clinterty, which was mainly used as a pig unit, a new dairy unit was built at Clinterty in an area known as the Haughs, and Mains of Tertowie farm housed the beef and sheep units. After the majority of the farms and land were sold Clinterty continued to offer courses in subjects such as small animal care and service engineering.

After the amalgamation of Clinterty with Aberdeen College of Commerce and Aberdeen Technical College to form Aberdeen College the farms were sold off and the facilities at Clinterty have largely been used by ASET International Oil & Gas Training Academy (ASET), the college's commercial training company for the oil, gas, engineering and construction industries.

Aberdeen College has further amalgamated with Banff & Buchan College to be renamed North East Scotland College.
