= Woama, Kono District =

- Location in Sierra Leone
- Coordinates: 9°30′N 12°14′W
- Country: Sierra Leone
- Province: Eastern Province
- District: Kono District
- Chiefdom: Tankoro Chiefdom
- Time zone: UTC-5 (GMT)

Woama is a village in Tankoro Chiefdom, Kono District in the Eastern Province of Sierra Leone, close to the border with Kailahun District. The major industry in the village is petty trading and farming.
