= Institut Supérieur Agronomique de Chott-Mariem =

Academic institution in Tunisia

The Higher Institute of Agronomic Sciences of Chott Mariem is an Institution of Higher education in Tunisia. It was founded in 1975. It is under supervision of the Ministry of Agriculture (IRESA), and the Ministry for Higher education and Scientific Research. It was founded in 1975 and is associated with the University of Sousse.

It offers preparatory courses, an undergraduate degree, and Master's and doctoral programs.
