= Nagahama Institute of Bio-Science and Technology =

Coordinates: 35.356926°N 136.280336°E

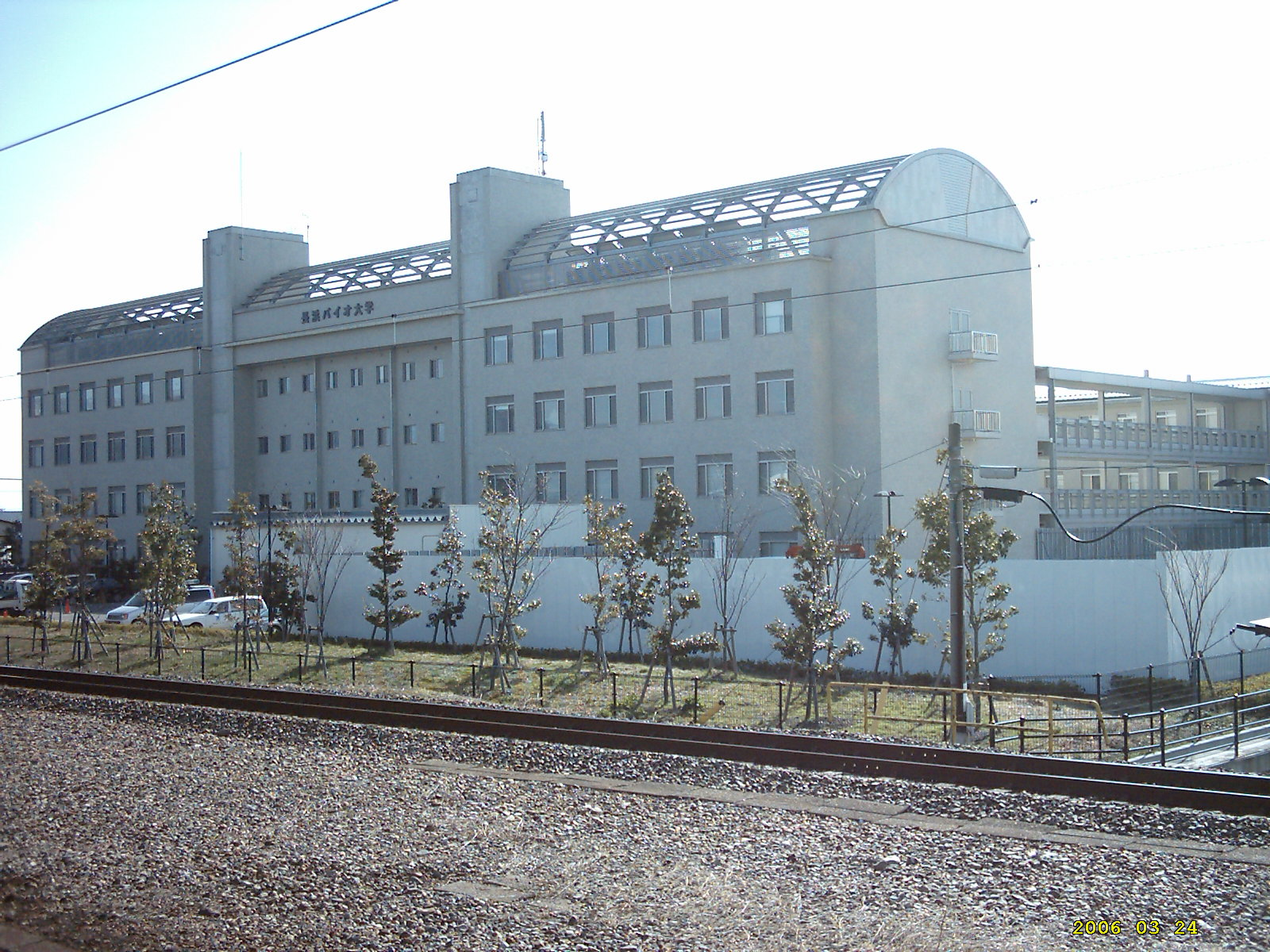
Nagahama Institute of Bio-Science and Technology

Nagahama Institute of Bio-Science and Technology (長浜バイオ大学, Nagahama baio daigaku) is a private university in Nagahama, Shiga, Japan, established in 2003.
