= Tianjin Agricultural University =

Agricultural school in Tianjin, China

- 天津农学院
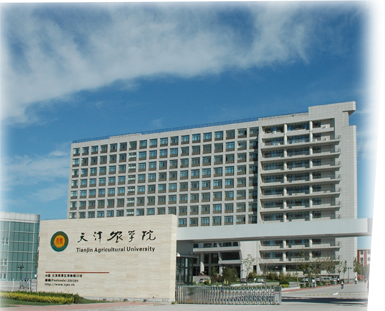
- Established: 1976
- Location: Tianjin, China

Tianjin Agricultural University (Chinese: 天津农学院; pinyin: Tiānjīn nóng xuéyuàn) is a university in Tianjin, China under the municipal government. Tianjin Agricultural University was founded in 1976. Approved by the Tianjin municipal government in 2002, Tianjin urban and rural economic school was merged into Tianjin Agricultural University. He was awarded a bachelor's degree in 1982 and a master's degree in 2006. In 1996, the first batch passed the evaluation of undergraduate teaching qualification by the Ministry of education. in 2007, it obtained " Excellence" in the evaluation of undergraduate teaching level conducted by the Ministry of Education. The school has agricultural science as its main body, and agricultural science, engineering, management, science of science, economics, literature and art have developed harmoniously. After many years of school-running practice, it has formed a distinctive school-running close to regional economic and social development and serving modern urban agriculture.
