= Altens =

District of Aberdeen, Scotland

Coordinates: 57.113378°N 2.082787°W

- Location within the Aberdeen City council area Location within Scotland
- OS grid reference: NJ950024
- Council area: Aberdeen City
- Lieutenancy area: Aberdeen
- Country: Scotland
- Sovereign state: United Kingdom
- Post town: ABERDEEN
- Postcode district: AB12
- Dialling code: 01224
- Police: Scotland
- Fire: Scottish
- Ambulance: Scottish
- UK Parliament: Aberdeen South
- Scottish Parliament: Aberdeen South and North Kincardine

Altens is a district in Aberdeen, on the north-east coast of Scotland.

== History ==
In the 1230s, Coupar Angus Abbey acquired a salt pan at Altens, with access to a peatery sufficient to fuel it.

== Industrial estate ==
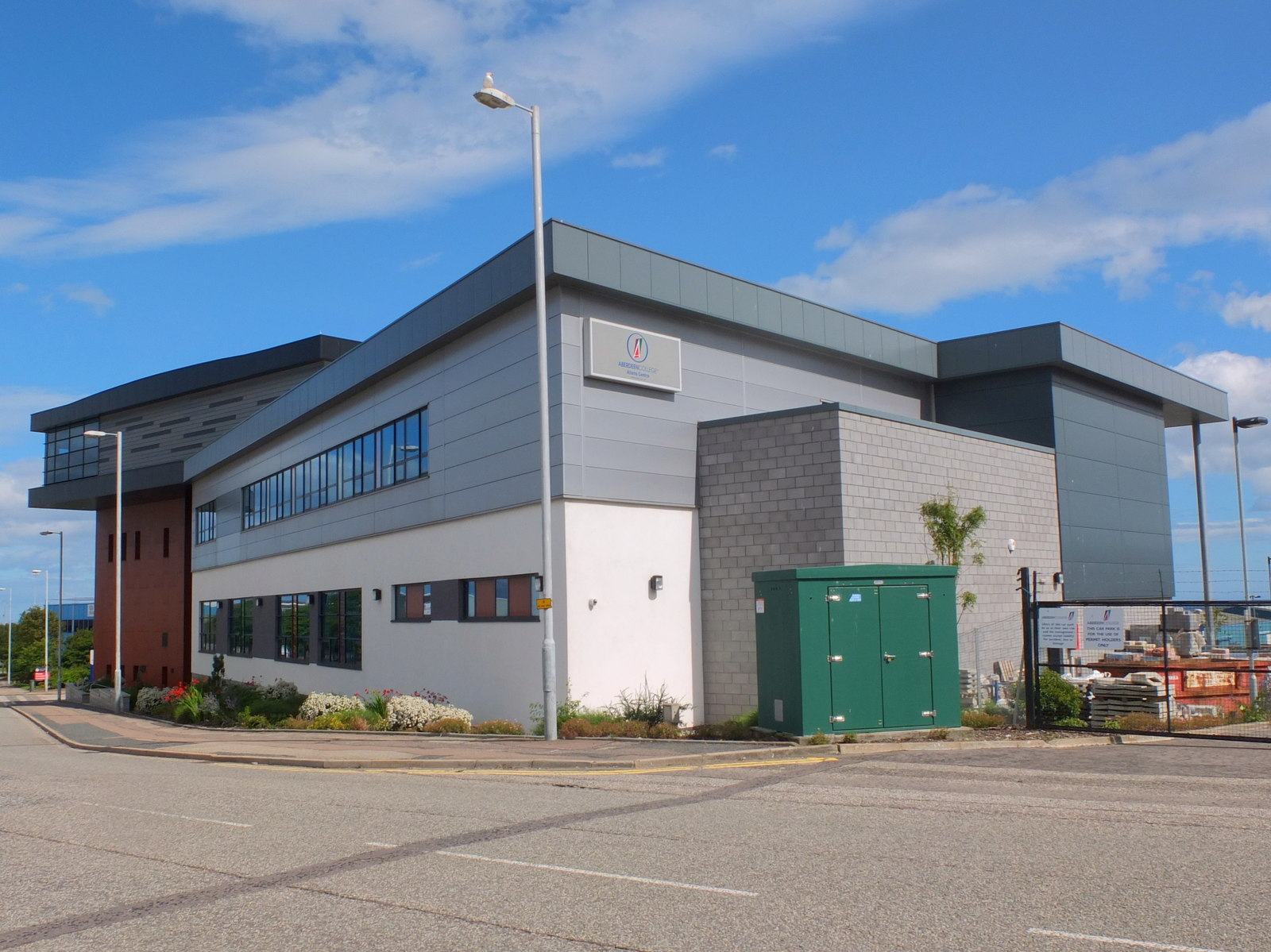
Nescol's Altens Campus.

Altens is home to a large industrial estate, alongside a similar estate in neighbouring Tullos. The industrial estates have offices. These included, until 2024 a large facility built for Royal Dutch Shell, as well as industrial units of various sizes, including the Royal Mail's main mail centre for the North East of Scotland. There are also warehouses, car dealerships, and a civic amenity site.

The industrial estate is also home to one of three North East Scotland College campuses in Aberdeen City.

It is the location of the headquarters of Grampian Continental and a depot for RTH Lubbers UK. These two companies have depots in England and the Netherlands.
