= Hiralal Chaudhuri =

Father of blue revolution in india

- Fisheries Scientist Hiralal Chaudhuri
- Born: 21 November 1921; Kubajpur, Sylhet (then Srihatta), Assam (in present-day Bangladesh), British India
- Died: 12 September 2014 (aged 92); Salt Lake, Kolkata, West Bengal, India
- Education: Bangabasi College (B.Sc.); Baliganj Science College (M.Sc.); Auburn University (MS degree); University of Calcutta (Ph.D.); Central Institute of Fisheries Education (D.Sc.)
- Known for: Father of induced breeding in Carp; Hypophysation; Blue revolution
- Awards: Chandrakala Hora Memorial Gold Medal, 1960; Rafi Ahmed Kidwai Award; Gamma Sigma Delta Award; Golden Key Award of the Auburn University, USA; World Aquaculture Award, 1994; D.Sc (Honorary) by Central Institute of Fisheries Education, Mumbai
- Scientific career
- Fields: Zoology; Biology; Fisheries science Fisheries management Induced reproduction in Carp
- Workplaces: Murari Chand College, Sylhet; Central Inland Fisheries Research Institute; University of the Philippines Los Baños, Philippines
- Academic advisors: H. S. Swingle

Dr. Hiralal Chaudhuri (Bengali: [Hīrālāla caudhurī]; 21 November 1921 – 12 September 2014) was an Indian Bengali fisheries scientist. He is known as the "father of induced breeding" of the carp. The Blue revolution in India was developed on the basis of his work on seed production technology through Hypophysation. He later led the way in intensive mixed farming to increase fish production in ponds.

== Early life and education ==
Hiralal Chaudhuri was born on 21 November 1921 in the village of Kubajpur, adjacent to the Surma Valley in Sylhet (then Srihatta), Assam (in present-day Bangladesh), British India. His father Girish Chandra Chaudhuri was a civil engineer and an officer of the Government of Assam. His mother was Soroshibala Chaudhuri. Chaudhuri was a very talented student from his early days. He completed his primary education at Laban Bengali Primary School, Shilong, and matriculated from Gomes School in Sylhet in 1936 with letters in four subjects. Due to being a meritorious student, on the basis of his ISC results, he was admitted to Bangabasi College, Calcutta. He completed his BSc with first class honours in 1941 and attained an MSc in Zoology from Baliganj Science College, University of Calcutta in 1943. In 1954, he went to the USA for special training under the guidance of H. S. Swingle at Auburn University. In 1955, he obtained an MS degree in Fisheries management from Auburn University in Alabama, USA for his thesis paper on the effect of pituitary injection on pond fish reproduction. He then moved back to India and received PhD from Calcutta University in 1961. The subject of his research was the effect of pituitary injection on fish breeding. In 2010, the Central Institute of Fisheries Education, Deemed University conferred on him the degree of DSc.

== Professional career ==
After passing his MSc, he started teaching in the department of biology at Murari Chand College, Sylhet, but lost his job during the Partition of India, along with five of his colleagues. He then migrated to India and joined the Central Inland Fisheries Research Institute (then known as the Manirampur Central Fisheries Station) near Barrackpore on 1 June 1948 as a junior research assistant. As well as working at the organisation's headquarters, he also researched at the CIFRI regional center at Cuttack, Orissa. In Cuttack CIFRI center he served as junior research assistant from 1948–50, senior research assistant from 1950–55, fishery extension officer from 1959–60, was in charge of fish breeding from 1960–63 and became the officer-in-charge in 1964. He then worked in the Fish Culture Division of Bhubaneswar from 1971–75 (present day Central Institute of Freshwater Aquaculture). He served as a director of CIFRI several times, and held various posts until his retirement in 1993. From 1967–76, he worked as a Fishery Advisor at the Food and Agricultural Organization/United Nations Development Programme (FAO/UNDP) in Myanmar. After taking voluntary retirement from active government service, he joined the Southeast Asian Fisheries Development Center (SEAFDEC) and served as a deputy director there from 1975–79. During 1988–93 he served as a visiting professor at UPLB in the Philippines.

=== Induced breeding methods ===
While in the center of Barrackpore, he noticed that oval-shaped transparent eggs came out as soon as he pressed the belly of fish floating in the tidal waters on the banks of the Ganges. After a few hours in a container, he saw the transmission of life. This phenomenon attracted Chaudhuri to think about the induced reproductive process in Carp. After nine years of research on fish endocrinology and physiology as a senior research assistant at Cuttack Fisheries Laboratory, on 10 July 1956, he succeeded in the induced breeding of carp species, which is considered to be one of the first basic works in zoology. He further continued his research on riverine Catfish to breed by injecting pituitary hormone. He also improved the hypophysation technique on Puntius sarana, Cirrhinus mrigala, Labeo rohita, and other Indian carp. In 1958 Chaudhuri was the first person to successfully hybridise carps by crossing major and minor carps of the genera Labeo, Cirrhinus, and Catla. He also elaborated on the twelve new hybrids of the carp species, insect infestations in ponds and their remedies, and the methods of pond rearing in a scientific manner. At this time, different countries of the world, including Myanmar (then Burma), Lao PDR, Fiji, Sudan, Malaysia, and the Philippines sought his skills for successful fish breeding programs.

== Honours ==
- Chandrakala Hora Memorial Gold Medal, 1960
- Rafi Ahmed Kidwai Award
- Gamma Sigma Delta Award
- Golden Key Award of the Auburn University, USA
- World Aquaculture Award, 1994
- Asiatic Society Award, 6 May 2002
- Honorary D.Sc by Central Institute of Fisheries Education, Mumbai
- Chair in Fisheries in the name of Hiralal Chaudhuri by University of Calcutta
- In 2001 Indian Government announced 10 July as the National Fish Farmers Day to honor Prof. Chaudhuri.

Hiralal Chaudhuri was honoured as the "Father of induced breeding" of the Carp and is also considered the pioneer of the global Blue revolution. In September 1994, A conference on Applications of Endocrinology to Pacific Rim Aquaculture was organised in his honor at the Bodega Merin Laboratory, University of California.
