= Bachelor of Fisheries Science =

Undergraduate degree in fisheries science

The Bachelor of Fisheries Science (B.F.Sc) is a bachelor's degree for studies in fisheries science in India. "Fisheries science" is the academic discipline of managing and understanding fisheries. It is a multidisciplinary science, which draws on the disciplines of aquaculture including breeding, genetics, biotechnology, nutrition, farming, diagnosis of diseases in fishes, other aquatic resources, medical treatment of aquatic animals; fish processing including curing, canning, freezing, value addition, byproducts and waste utilization, quality assurance and certification, fisheries microbiology, fisheries biochemistry; fisheries resource management including biology, anatomy, taxonomy, physiology, population dynamics; fisheries environment including oceanography, limnology, ecology, biodiversity, aquatic pollution; fishing technology including gear and craft engineering, navigation and seamanship, marine engines; fisheries economics and management and fisheries extension. Fisheries science is generally a 4-year course typically taught in a university setting, and can be the focus of an undergraduate, postgraduate or Ph.D. program. Bachelor level fisheries courses (B.F.Sc) were started by the state agricultural universities to make available the much needed technically competent personnel for teaching, research and development and transfer of technology in the field of fisheries science.

== History ==
Fisheries education in India, started with the establishment of the Central Institute of Fisheries Education, Mumbai in 1961 for in service training and later the establishment of the first Fisheries College at Mangalore under the State Agricultural University (SAU) system in 1969, has grown manifold and evolved in the last four decades as a professional discipline consisting of Bachelors, Masters and Doctoral programmes in various branches of Fisheries Science. At present, 25 Fisheries Colleges offer four-year degree programme in Bachelor of Fisheries Science (B.F.Sc), while 10 of them offer Master of Fisheries Science (M.F.Sc) in various disciplines and 6 offer Doctoral programmes. The undergraduate curricula and syllabi were periodically revised by ICAR for a common syllabus. All the Fisheries Colleges are in the process of adapting these, bringing in parity of standards between Colleges.

== Eligibility ==
The eligibility for most of these courses is the study of science until class 12 in school. As the degree in Fisheries Science is a science degree, one needs to have studied science with PCB or PCMB or PCM and agriculture until class 12. Selection process is either through state level entrance examination or via all India level ICAR (Indian Council of Agricultural Research) examination. After completion of B.F.Sc candidates can go for M.F.Sc and PhD.

Colleges awarding Bachelor of Fisheries Science- B.F.Sc and Master of Fisheries Science- MFSc degrees in the field of fisheries and conducting various training programmes and diploma and certificate courses in fisheries.

No.	College Name	Location	Affiliation	Estd
1	College of Fisheries	Mangalore, Karnataka	Karnataka Veterinary Animal and Fisheries Sciences University	1969
2	Fisheries College and Research Institute	Thoothukudi, Tamil Nadu	Tamil Nadu Fisheries University	1977
3	College of Fisheries	Panangad, Kerala	Kerala University of Fisheries and Ocean Studies	1979
4	College of Fisheries	Rangailunda, Orissa	Orissa University of Agriculture and Technology	1981
5	College of Fisheries	Ratnagiri, Maharashtra	Dr. Balasaheb Sawant Konkan Krishi Vidyapeeth	1981
6	College of Fishery Science	Pantnagar, Uttaranchal	GB. Pant University of Agriculture & Technology	1985
7	College of Fisheries	Dholi, Bihar	Rajendra Agricultural university	1986
8	College of Fisheries	Raha, Assam	Assam Agricultural University	1988
9	College of Fisheries	Veraval, Gujarat	Gujarat Agricultural University	1991
10	College of Fishery Science	Muthukur, Andhra Pradesh	Sri Venkateswara Veterinary University	1992
11	Faculty of Fishery Sciences	Kolkata, West Bengal	West Bengal University of Animal and Fishery Sciences	1995
12	College of Fisheries	Lembucherra, Tripura	Central Agricultural University	1998
13	College of Fisheries	Udaipur, Rajasthan	Maharana pratap University of Agriculture and Technology	2003
14	College of Fisheries	Srinagar, Kashmir	S.K. University of Agricultural Sciences and Technology	2005
15	College of Fishery Science	Nagpur, Maharashtra	Maharashtra Animal & Fishery Sciences University	2007
16	College of Fisheries	Faizabad, Uttar Pradesh	Narendra Deva University of Agriculture and Technology	2007
17	College of Fisheries	Udgir, Maharashtra	Maharashtra Animal & Fishery Sciences University	2007
18	College of Fisheries	Ludhiana, Punjab	Guru Angad Dev Veterinary & Animal Sciences University	2009
19	College of Fisheries	Kawardha, Chhattisgarh	Chhattisgarh Kamdhenu Vishwavidyalaya	2010
20	College of Fishery Science	Jabalpur, Madhya Pradesh	Nanaji Deshmukh Veterinary Science University	2012
21	Fisheries College and Research Institute	Ponneri, Tamil Nadu	Tamil Nadu Fisheries University	2013
22	College of Fisheries Science and Research	Etawah, Uttar Pradesh	Chandra Shekhar Azad University of Agriculture & Technology	2015
23	Fisheries Science College	Pebbair, Telangana,	P.V. Narasimha Rao Telangana Veterinary University	2017
24	Fisheries College and Research Institute	Thalainayar, Tamil Nadu	Tamil Nadu Fisheries University	2017
25	College of Fisheries Science	Gumla, Jharkhand	Birsa Agricultural University	2017

== Opportunities for Fisheries Graduates ==
=== State Government ===
Every state government has a Fisheries Department in which fisheries graduate can apply for the post of Inspector of Fisheries/Research Assistants, Sub-Inspector of Fisheries, assistant directors, Assistant Fisheries Development Officer ( AFDO ) / Fisheries Extension Officer ( FEO ) and Fisheries Development Officer(FDO). In State Fisheries Development Corporations, they can apply for the posts of Deputy Managers, Managers, Project Officers and Fisheries Officers. In Fish Farmers Development Agency (FFDA) and Brackish water Farmers Development Agency (BFDA), they can apply for the post of Executive Officers in respective states. Eligibility criteria vary for each state and can be known from respective public service commissions.

=== Central Government ===
Apart from Central Fisheries Institute listed previously, one can get job in central agencies like as Technical Officers and assistant directors in Marine Product Export Development Authority (MPEDA) Export Inspection Agency (EIA), Coastal Aquaculture Authority of India (CAA), Food Safety and Standards Authority of India (FSSAI) and as Technical Officers and Scientists in Fisheries Survey of India (FSI), National Institute of Oceanography (NIO), Indian National Centre for Ocean and Information Services (INCOIS), Hyderabad, etc.

=== Academic Institutes ===
Candidates having degree (B.F.Sc) can apply for the post of Instructor, Research Assistant, Biochemist, Biologist, Technicians, etc. in some conventional universities. Candidates having postgraduate degree ( M.F.Sc ) can apply for the post of assistant professor in the faculty of Fisheries. For the recruitment as scientists in various agricultural and fisheries Institutions under the ICAR, Agricultural Scientist Recruitment Board (ASRB) conducts an All India Competitive Exam, Agricultural Research Service (ARS ) followed by viva voce.

=== Nationalised Banks ===
Fisheries graduates can get jobs as an Assistant Development Officer in NABARD, Rural Development Officer, Field Officer, Managers in agriculture loan section in nationalized as well as private banks.r76

=== Private Sector ===
Candidates can work as a manager or officers in seafood processing and export units:

==== Scope in Fish Processing sector ====
The fish processing industry is well developed in the country. There are about 236 EU approved processing plants and 33 exclusive cold storage facility (storing fish & fishery products only) are available. In addition to this, 215 ice plants, 481 shrimp peeling plants, 371 freezing plants, 495 cold storage units, 7 canning plants, 16 fish-meal plants, 11 surimi plants, and one agar-agar production unit are also present. Lot of jobs are available in the above units

==== Scope in Fish Farming and allied sectors ====
Most of the fish farms employ professional fisheries graduates as Farm In Charge. Apart from this, the fish feed requirement is growing steadily. There are 33 feed mills with an installed capacity of 150 000 tpa. This sector is providing direct employment to about 0.3 million people and ancillary activities provide employment to 0.6–0.7 million people.

=== Self Employment ===
The technical competency of the professional fisheries graduates make them as successful Aqua Consultants. Most of them are working in this area. As an entrepreneur, after obtaining the professional degree in B.F.Sc, candidate can start their own enterprise. The financial support can be obtained through NABARD or through other nationalized banks. The main area in which fisheries enterprise can be developed are: Feed manufacturing, feed sales, ornamental fish culture and breeding, aquaculture, hatchery and seed production, fish processing and marketing, net making, establishment of Agri Clinics for fish disease diagnosis and for testing and supply of farm inputs.

=== Jobs Abroad ===
Apart from scope for higher education in fisheries in countries such as USA, Canada, Australia, Japan, China and in European countries, there are a demand for fisheries professionals in the aquaculture and processing sectors in Gulf and African countries. Several fisheries graduates are doing business in foreign countries in field of aquaculture, fish processing export and import.
