= Network of Aquaculture Centres in Asia-Pacific =

- Logo of the Network of Aquaculture Centres in Asia-Pacific
- Abbreviation: NACA
- Formation: 11 January 1990 (36 years ago)
- Type: International organization
- Purpose: Aquaculture
- Headquarters: Bangkok, Thailand
- Coordinates: 13.8472841°N 100.5714011°E
- Region served: Asia Pacific
- Members: 20 state members, 3 associate member organisations
- Director-General: Eduardo Leano
- Website: enaca.org

The Network of Aquaculture Centres in Asia-Pacific (NACA) was formed by International treaty titled Agreement on the Network of Aquaculture Centres in Asia and the Pacific signed in Bangkok on 8 January 1988.

The purpose of the NACA is to promote rural development through sustainable aquaculture and aquatic resources management. NACA's objectives are to:

- Improve food security.
- Increase rural income and employment.
- Diversify farm production.
- Increase foreign exchange earnings.

NACA provides a networking platform for technical cooperation and capacity building between nineteen member states, their research centres, and the Food and Agriculture Organisation of the United Nations, which has an advisory role on the NACA Governing Council.

The NACA Secretariat is hosted by the Government of Thailand, in the Department of Fisheries compound at Kasetsart University, Bangkok.

== The network ==
The member states of NACA and participating research and development (R&D) institutions are:

Member	R&D Institute
Australia	Australian Institute of Marine Science; CSIRO Marine and Atmospheric Research; Institute for Marine and Antarctic Studies; School of Life & Environmental Sciences, Deakin University; South Australian Research and Development Institute
Bangladesh	Bangladesh Fisheries Research Institute
Cambodia	Cambodia Fisheries Administration
China	Freshwater Fisheries Research Centre (Regional Lead Centre); Pearl River Fisheries Research Institute; Shanghai Ocean University; Yellow Sea Fisheries Research Institute
Hong Kong	Agriculture, Fisheries and Conservation Department
India	Central Inland Fisheries Research Institute; Central Institute of Brackishwater Aquaculture; Central Institute of Fisheries Education; Central Marine Fisheries Research Institute; Central Institute of Freshwater Aquaculture (Regional Lead Centre); Marine Products Export Development Authority; National Bureau of Fish Genetic Resources; Directorate of Coldwater Fisheries Research
Indonesia	Brackishwater Aquaculture Development Centre, Takalar; Brackishwater Aquaculture Development Centre, Situbondo; Main Centre for Mariculture Development, Lampung; Mariculture Development Centre, Ambon; Mariculture Development Centre, Batam; Mariculture Development Centre, Lombok
Iran	International Sturgeon Research Institute; Iran Fisheries Organization (Shilat); Iranian Fisheries Research Organization (Regional Lead Centre)
Laos	Living Aquatic Resources Research Centre
Malaysia	Department of Fisheries
Maldives	Ministry of Fisheries and Agriculture
Myanmar	Department of Fisheries
Nepal	Agriculture Information and Communication Centre; Directorate of Fisheries Development; Nepal Agricultural Research Council
North Korea	(currently none)
Pakistan	Ministry of Ports and Shipping
Philippines	SEAFDEC Aquaculture Department (Regional Lead Centre)
Saudi Arabia	(currently none)
Sri Lanka	National Aquatic Resources Research and Development; National Aquaculture Development Authority
Thailand	Aquatic Animal Health Research and Development Division; Freshwater Aquaculture Research and Development Center (Regional Lead Centre); SEAFDEC Secretariat
Vietnam	Fisheries Informatics Centre; Institute of Aquaculture, Nha Trang University; Research Institute for Aquaculture No. 1; Research Institute for Aquaculture No. 2; Research Institute for Aquaculture No. 3

NACA maintains technical cooperation linkages with other regions through reciprocal Associate Membership of external organisations including:

- Asia-Pacific Association of Agricultural Research Institutions
- Network of Aquaculture Centres in Central and Eastern Europe
- Secretariat of the Pacific Community
