= Master of Fisheries Science =

The Master of Fisheries Science (M.F.Sc) is a master's degree for studies in fisheries science in India. Fisheries science is the academic discipline of managing and understanding fisheries. It is typically taught in a university setting, and can be the focus of an undergraduate, postgraduate or Ph.D. program. Master level fisheries courses were started by the state agricultural universities to make available the much needed technically competent personnel for teaching, research and development and transfer of technology in the field of fisheries science.

== History ==
Fisheries education in India started with the establishment of the Central Institute of Fisheries Education, Mumbai, in 1961, for in-service training, and later with the establishment of the College of Fisheries at Mangalore under the State Agricultural University (SAU) system in 1969. Over the next four decades, the field grew manifold and evolved as a professional discipline consisting of Bachelor's, Master's and Doctoral programmes in various branches of Fisheries Science. At present, out of the nineteen Fisheries Colleges, ten of them offer Master of Fisheries Science in various disciplines and six offer Doctoral programmes. The postgraduate curricula and syllabi are periodically revised by the Indian Council of Agricultural Research (ICAR) for a common syllabus. All the Fisheries Colleges are in the process of adapting these, bringing in parity of standards between Colleges.

== Eligibility ==
The postgraduate degree Master of Fisheries Science is a two-year course offered in various disciplines. Candidates possessing a Bachelor of Fisheries Science degree from SAU are eligible for admission through a common entrance test conducted by various universities. ICAR common syllabus for M.F.Sc. programme is periodically revised. The programme has 55 total credits, including 1 credit for seminar and 15 credits for research.

The Doctor of Philosophy (Ph.D.) is a three-year course offered in various disciplines. The Ph.D. programmes are offered in regular and part-time mode. Candidates possessing a basic B.F.Sc. degree from SAU are eligible for admission through a common entrance test conducted by various universities. The programme has 75 total credits, including 2 credits for seminar and 45 credits for research.

Various colleges are awarding Master (MFSc) degrees, Doctoral degree and M.Phil in the field of fisheries science and conducting various training programmes and diploma and certificate courses in fisheries.

No.	College Name	Location	Affiliation	Estd
1	College of Fisheries	Mangalore, Karnataka	Karnataka Veterinary Animal and Fisheries Sciences University	1969
2	Fisheries College and Research Institute	Thoothukudi, Tamil Nadu	Tamil Nadu Fisheries University	1977
3	College of Fisheries	Panangad, Kerala	Kerala University of Fisheries and Ocean Studies	1979
4	College of Fisheries	Rangailunda, Orissa	Orissa University of Agriculture and Technology	1981
5	College of Fisheries	Dapoli, Maharashtra	Dr. Balasaheb Sawant Konkan Krishi Vidyapeeth	1981
6	College of Fishery Science	Pantnagar, Uttaranchal	G. B. Pant University of Agriculture and Technology	1985
7	College of Fishery Science	Muthukkur, Andhra Pradesh	Acharya N. G. Ranga Agricultural University	1992
8	College of Fishery Sciences	Kolkata, West Bengal	West Bengal University of Animal and Fishery Sciences	1995
9	College of Fisheries	Lembucherra, Tripura	Central Agricultural University	1998
10	Central Institute of Fisheries Education	Mumbai, Maharashtra	Deemed University, ICAR	1961

== Opportunities for fisheries graduates ==
=== State government ===
Every state government has a Fisheries Department in which fisheries graduate can apply for the post of Inspector of Fisheries/Research Assistants, Sub-Inspector of Fisheries, Assistant Directors, Assistant Fisheries Development Officer (AFDO) / Fisheries Extension Officer (FEO) and Fisheries Development Officer(FDO). In State Fisheries Development Corporations, they can apply for the posts of Deputy Managers, Managers, Project Officers and Fisheries Officers. In Fish Farmers Development Agency (FFDA) and Brackish water Farmers Development Agency (BFDA), they can apply for the post of Executive Officers in respective states. Eligibility criteria vary for each state and can be known from respective public service commissions.

=== Central government ===
Apart from Central Fisheries Institutes listed previously, one can get a job in central agencies; for example, as Technical Officers and Assistant Directors in Marine Products Export Development Authority (MPEDA), Export Inspection Agency (EIA), Coastal Aquaculture Authority of India (CAA), Food Safety and Standards Authority of India (FSSAI) and as Technical Officers and Scientists in Fisheries Survey of India (FSI), National Institute of Oceanography (NIO), Indian National Centre for Ocean Information Services (INCOIS), Hyderabad, etc.

=== Academic institutes ===
Candidates with bachelor's degrees can apply for the post of Instructor, Research Assistant, Biochemist, Biologist, Technicians, etc. in some conventional universities. Candidates with postgraduate degrees can apply for the post of Assistant Professor in the faculty of Fisheries. For the recruitment of scientists in various agricultural and fisheries Institutions under the ICAR, Agricultural Scientist Recruitment Board (ASRB) conducts an All India Competitive Exam, Agricultural Research Service (ARS) followed by viva voce.

=== Nationalised banks ===
Fisheries graduates can get jobs as an Assistant Development Officer in National Bank for Agriculture and Rural Development (NABARD), Rural Development Officer, Field Officer, Managers in agriculture loan section in nationalized as well as private banks.

=== Private sector ===
Candidates can work as a manager or officers in seafood processing and export units:

==== Scope in fish processing sector ====
The fish processing industry is well developed in the country. There are about 236 EU-approved processing plants and 33 exclusive cold storage facility (storing fish & fishery products only) are available. In addition to this, 215 ice plants, 481 shrimp peeling plants, 371 freezing plants, 495 cold storage units, 7 canning plants, 16 fish meal plants, 11 surimi plants, and one agar-agar production unit are also present. Lot of jobs are available in the above units.

==== Scope in fish farming and allied sectors ====
Most of the fish farms employ professional fisheries graduates as Farm In Charge. Apart from this, the fish feed requirement is growing steadily. There are 33 feed mills with an installed capacity of 150 000 tpa. This sector is providing direct employment to about 0.3 million people and ancillary activities provide employment to 0.6-0.7 million people.

=== Self-employment ===
The technical competency of the professional fisheries graduates make them as successful Aqua Consultants. Most of them are working in this area. As an entrepreneur, after obtaining the professional degree in B.F.Sc, candidates can start their own enterprise. The financial support can be obtained through NABARD or through other nationalized banks. The main area in which fisheries enterprise can be developed are: feed manufacturing, feed sales, ornamental fish culture and breeding, aquaculture, hatchery and seed production, fish processing and marketing, net making, establishment of Agri Clinics for fish disease diagnosis and for testing and supply of farm inputs.

=== Jobs abroad ===
Apart from scope for higher education in fisheries in countries such as USA, Canada, Australia, Japan, China and in European countries, there is a demand for fisheries professionals in the aquaculture and processing sectors in Gulf and African countries. Several fisheries graduates are doing business in foreign countries in field of aquaculture, fish processing export and import.
