= College of Fisheries Science and Research Centre, Etawah =

College in Etawah, Uttar Pradesh, India

- Other names: Faculty of Fisheries Science
- Type: Government College
- Established: 2015
- Parent institution: Chandra Shekhar Azad University of Agriculture and Technology
- Affiliations: CSAUA&T
- Students: 31
- Location: Etawah, Uttar Pradesh, India; 26.78906°N 79.0073167°E
- Campus: 3.95 acres
- Website: http://www.csauct.in/fisheries_dept.php

The College of Fisheries Science and Research Centre is a government college in Etawah, Uttar Pradesh, India, started in 4th dean committee 2015. And 5th dean committee 1st Batch start 2016 It is also known as the Faculty of Fisheries Science, Chandra Shekhar Azad University of Agriculture and Technology.

== See also ==
- Central Institute of Fisheries Education
- Chandra Shekhar Azad University of Agriculture and Technology
- Baba Saheb Dr. Bhim Rao Ambedkar College of Agricultural Engineering and Technology
- College of Dairy Technology, Etawah
- Tamil Nadu Fisheries University
- Fisheries College and Research Institute
- College of Fisheries, Mangalore
