= Subbanna Ayyappan =

Indian aquaculture scientist (1955–2025)

Subbanna Ayyappan Padma Shri
- Born: Subbanna Ayyappan; 10 December 1955; Mysore, Karnataka, India
- Died: 10 May 2025 (aged 69)
- Education: (M. F. Sc.) College of Fisheries, Mangalore; (PhD) University of Agricultural Sciences, Bangalore
- Known for: Blue Revolution in India
- Children: 2
- Awards: 2022 Padma Shri; 1997-Zahoor Qasim Gold Medal; Special ICAR Award-1997; Dr. V.G. Jhingran Gold medal-2002; Prof. H.P.C. Shetty Award for Excellence in Fisheries Research and Development-2002
- Scientific career
- Fields: Aquaculture
- Workplaces: Director-General of Indian Council of Agricultural Research (ICAR); Secretary to Government, Department of Agricultural Research and Education (DARE); Director, CIFA, Bhubaneswar; Director, CIFA, Bhubaneswar; Director, CIFE, Mumbai Chief Executive of the National Fisheries Development Board, DAHD&I, Hyderabad; Chairman of National Accreditation Board for Testing and Calibration Laboratories (NABL); Chairman, Karnataka Science and Technology Academy (KSTA); Vice Chancellor, Central Agricultural University, Imphal

Subbanna Ayyappan (10 December 1955 – 10 May 2025) was an Indian aquaculture scientist hailing from the Karnataka State who held several key positions in various government organisations related to agricultural science. He was the Director-General of Indian Council of Agricultural Research (ICAR) and Secretary to Government, Department of Agricultural Research and Education (DARE) from January 2010 to February 2016. He was also the Chancellor of Central Agricultural University, Manipur. He was instrumental in bringing about the Blue Revolution in India. He was the first non-crop scientist to head the ICAR.

Ayyappan held a Ph.D. degree and a master's degree in Fish Production and Management from the College of Fisheries in Mangalore which was then a part of the University of Agricultural Sciences, Bangalore. He published several research papers in areas of fisheries, limnology, and aquatic microbiology.

Ayyappan began his career in ICAR as a scientist at Central Inland Fisheries Research Institute, Barrackpore in 1978. In 1996 he was appointed the Director, CIFA, Bhubaneswar, where he served for almost five years prior to holding the office of the Director, CIFE, Mumbai (Deemed University). He came to the ICAR headquarters in 2002 as the Deputy Director General (Fisheries) and served for almost eight years in that capacity before taking up the important post of the Secretary, DARE and Director General, ICAR on 1 January 2010. He was the founder Chief Executive of the National Fisheries Development Board, DAHD&I, Hyderabad (2006–2008). Ayyappan was also Chairman of National Accreditation Board for Testing and Calibration Laboratories (NABL).

== Death ==
Ayyappan was reported missing on 7 May 2025. On 10 May, his body was found in the River Cauvery near Sai Ashram at Srirangapatna, Karnataka, a favourite place of his for dhyana. He was 69. Investigations indicated that he died by suicide.

== Recognition ==
=== Padma Shri ===
In 2022, the Government of India conferred the Padma Shri award, the third highest award in the Padma series of awards, on Subbanna Ayyappan for his distinguished service in the field of science and engineering. The award is in recognition of his service as a "Respected Aquaculture Scientist, playing a key role in powering India's Blue Revolution".

=== Other recognitions and awards ===
Subbanna Ayyappan received several recognitions and awards for his work related to aquaculture and related areas. These include:

- Zahoor Qasim Gold Medal awarded by the Society of Biosciences in India (1996–1997)
- Special ICAR Award (1997)
- ICAR Award for Team Research as the Team leader for significant contributions in fisheries (1997–1998)
- Dr. V.G. Jhingran Gold medal (2002)
- Prof. H.P.C. Shetty Award for Excellence in Fisheries Research and Development, Asian Fisheries Society, Indian Branch (2002)
- Asian Scientist 100, Asian Scientist (2023)
