= Srinath =

Srinath may refer to:

- Vishnu, a Hindu deity, husband (nath) of Sri (Lakshmi)

== Given name ==
- Srinath (Kannada actor) (born 1944), Indian actor in Kannada cinema
- Sreenath (1956–2010), Indian actor in Malayalam cinema
- Srinath (born 1973), Minister for Fisheries – Fishermen Welfare of Tamil Nadu
- Ramana (actor) (born 1978), Indian actor in Telugu and Tamil cinema, formerly credited as Srinath in Telugu cinema

== Surname ==
- Shraddha Srinath (born 1990), Indian actress
- Javagal Srinath (born 1969), Indian cricketer

== See also ==
- Shrinath, a form of the Hindu deity Krishna
