= ICAR CIFE Rohtak centre =

Research campus in Haryana, India

Coordinates: 28.8616°N 76.4738°E

Central Institute of Fisheries Education, Rohtak centre
- Type: Public
- Parent institution: India Ministry of Agriculture & Farmers Welfare
- Academic affiliations: ICAR
- Location: Lahli Village, Rohtak-Bhiwani road, Rohtak, Haryana, India
- Campus: 32 acres (13 ha)

ICAR - Central Institute of Fisheries Education, Rohtak also called as ICAR-CIFE Rohtak is one of the regional research and education campus of the Central Institute of Fisheries Education (CIFE), which is a Deemed to be University and institution of higher learning for fisheries science.

== History ==
CIFE Rohtak is the only central research centre in India dedicated to research on use of inland saline soils and ground water for fish and shrimp culture (Inland saline aquaculture). Traditionally a non fish growing state, CIFE pioneered scientific fish farming in Haryana after successful pilot studies and demonstrations at Dumduma and Sultanpur farm in Gurgaon District, Haryana beginning as early as 1980. In order to further strengthen research in Inland saline aquaculture, CIFE shifted its research centre from Sultanpur to what was then the National seed farm facility under state fisheries department near Rohtak (Lahli-Baiyani Villages) in April 1996.

== Location ==
ICAR-CIFE Rohtak centre is located in Lahli Village, Rohtak, Haryana. The centre is located about 15 km (9.3 mi) from Rohtak city on Rohtak – Bhiwani road.

== Facilities ==
This research center has a total farm area of 32 acres (13 ha). It has two farms i.e., Baniyani farm dedicated towards high inland saline aquaculture research activities and Lahli farm where low inland saline aquaculture research activities are performed. The center has a soil and water testing lab facility, scampi (giant freshwater prawn) hatchery with the seed production capacity of five million post larvae annually and a wet laboratory to conduct indoor experiments.

== Salient research achievements ==
- Technology on the commercial farming of Pacific white shrimp (Litopenaeus vannamei) using inland saline ground water.
- Technology on the commercial farming of Tiger shrimp (Penaeus monodon) in saline affected soils using inland saline water.
- Giant freshwater Prawn (Macrobrachium Rosenbergii) seed production and culture technology for inland saline water / soil areas
- Grow out culture technologies for Indian Major carps (IMC) & Minor carps in low saline water areas.
- Pangasius (Pangasianodon hypophthalmus) culture technology for low inland saline water / soil areas.
- Technology for raising Freshwater prawn brood stock in winter season.

== Candidate Species for inland saline aquaculture research ==
=== Fin fish ===
- Lates calcarifer (Barramundi or Asian sea bass)
- Trachinotis blochii (Silver pampano)
- Rachycentron canadum (Cobia)
- Oreochromis niloticus GIFT strain (GIFT Tilapia)
- Pangasianodon hypophthalmus (Pangasius) - in low saline water
- Carps - in low saline water

=== Shell fish ===
- Litopenaeus vannamei (Pacific white shrimp)
- Penaeus monodon (Giant tiger shrimp)
- Macrobrachium Rosenbergii (Giant freshwater Prawn or Scampi)

== Impact of inland saline shrimp culture technology developed by CIFE Rohtak Centre in Haryana ==
In 2013, CIFE Rohtak centre demonstrated Tiger shrimp culture technology in inland saline waters in the farmer's field with the support of NABARD-SDC Rural Innovation Fund. Then in 2014, three farmers of Haryana adopted Pacific white shrimp culture technology in inland saline waters in a total area of about 12 acres (4.9 ha). In 2015, about 25 farmers took up the technology in a total area of about 75 acres. This technology has widely reached among the farmers and more and more farmers are showing interest to adopt this technology. Presently the state fisheries department, Government of Haryana is providing 50% financial assistance to farmers to take up inland saline shrimp culture technology under RKVY scheme.
