= Kishan Singh (biologist) =

Indian plant pathologist (1931–2012)

- Born: 10 July 1931; India
- Died: 2 September 2012 (aged 81)
- Education: Chandra Shekhar Azad University of Agriculture and Technology
- Known for: Pathology of sugarcane
- Awards: 1976 Shanti Swarup Bhatnagar Prize
- Scientific career
- Fields: Plant pathology; Phytonematology

Kishan Singh (10 July 1931 – 2 September 2012) was an Indian plant pathologist, known for his contributions to the pathology of crops, especially sugarcane. An alumnus of the Chandra Shekhar Azad University of Agriculture and Technology, he is reported to have done seminal research on the epidemiology and control of sugarcane diseases and suggested disease management through hot air therapy. He has published his research findings by way of articles and books, which include Soil fungicides (2 volumes), Recent advances in plant pathology, The national research grid for sugarcane in India, Sugarcane diseases and prospects of their control, Diseases of sugarbeet in India, Grassy shoot disease of sugarcane : III: response of varieties to infection, Innovations in companion cropping with sugarcane and Laminar infection of sugarcane leaves by red rot (Physalospora tucumanensis) organism in nature. The Council of Scientific and Industrial Research, the apex agency of the Government of India for scientific research, awarded him the Shanti Swarup Bhatnagar Prize for Science and Technology, one of the highest Indian science awards, in 1976, for his contributions to biological sciences. Singh died on 2 September 2012, at the age of 81.

== See also ==
- Plant pathology
- List of sugarcane diseases
