= Southeast Asian Fisheries Development Center Aquaculture Department =

International R&D organization in Southeast Asia

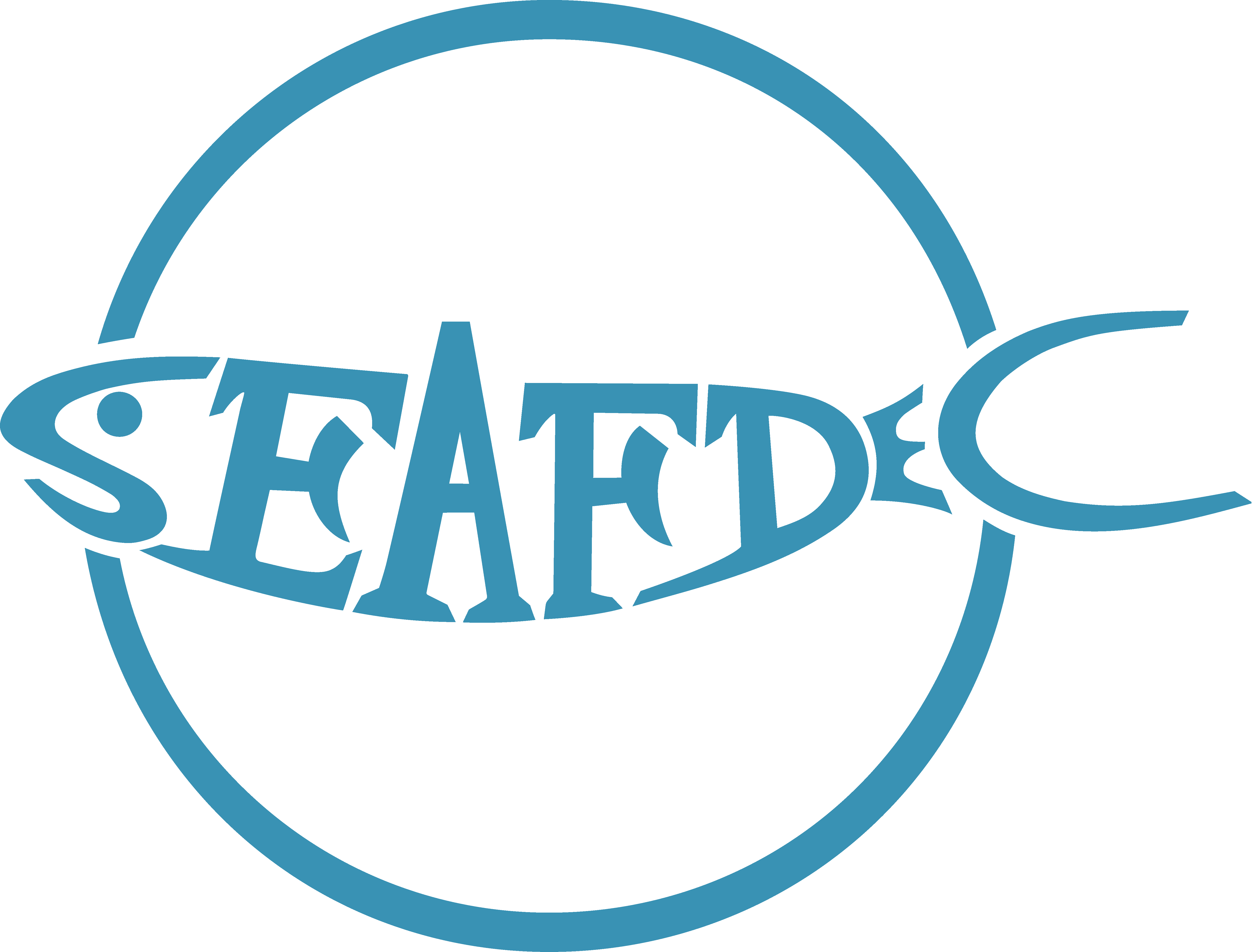
- Formation: 1973
- Legal status: Intergovernmental Organization
- Purpose: Research, technology generation, information dissemination, and training in aquaculture
- Headquarters: Tigbauan, Iloilo
- Location: Philippines
- Members: 11 countries: Brunei; Cambodia; Indonesia; Japan; Laos; Malaysia; Myanmar; Philippines; Singapore; Thailand; Vietnam
- Chief: Dan D. Baliao
- Website: www.seafdec.org.ph

The Southeast Asian Fisheries Development Center Aquaculture Department (SEAFDEC/AQD) is an inter-governmental organization established in 1973 with headquarters in Iloilo, Philippines. It is tasked with conducting research, developing new technologies, sharing information, and providing training in the cultivation of various aquatic species, including fish, crustaceans, mollusks, and seaweeds.

SEAFDEC/AQD serves as one of five technical department of SEAFDEC and currently has eleven member countries: Brunei, Cambodia, Indonesia, Japan, Laos, Malaysia, Myanmar, Philippines, Singapore, Thailand, and Vietnam. It also serves as the Regional Lead Centre in the Philippines of the Network of Aquaculture Centres in Asia-Pacific (NACA) with shrimp and brackishwater finfish culture as its farming system of competence.

== Stations ==
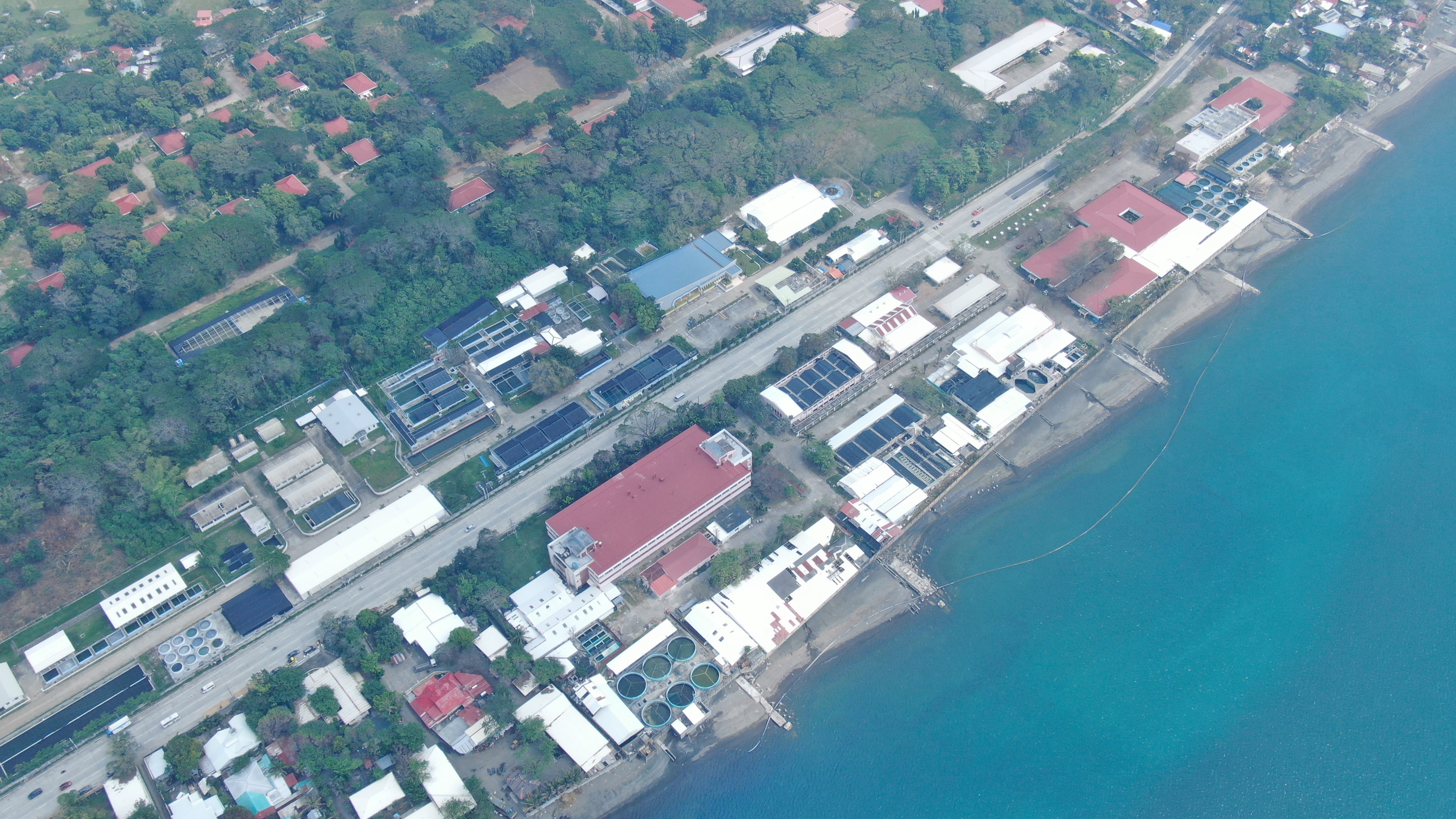
The Tigbauan Main Station is the headquarters of the Southeast Asian Fisheries Development Center Aquaculture Department (SEAFDEC/AQD) in Tigbauan, Iloilo, as of November 2024.

SEAFDEC/AQD maintains four stations in the Philippines to cater to aquaculture research in different aquatic environments.

=== Tigbauan Main Station ===
The Tigbauan Main Station (TMS) is a 40-hectare complex in Tigbauan, Iloilo and is the primary research facility for SEAFDEC/AQD's researchers and scientists. It hosts numerous broodstock facilities and hatcheries for commercially important fish, crustaceans, mollusks, seaweeds, and other aquatic organisms. A range of analytical and biotech laboratories also provide support to the organization's research activities.

Other facilities in TMS include feed mills, an aquaculture library, training facilities, and FishWorld, a museum-aquarium center dedicated to aquaculture, fisheries, aquatic ecology, and biodiversity education.

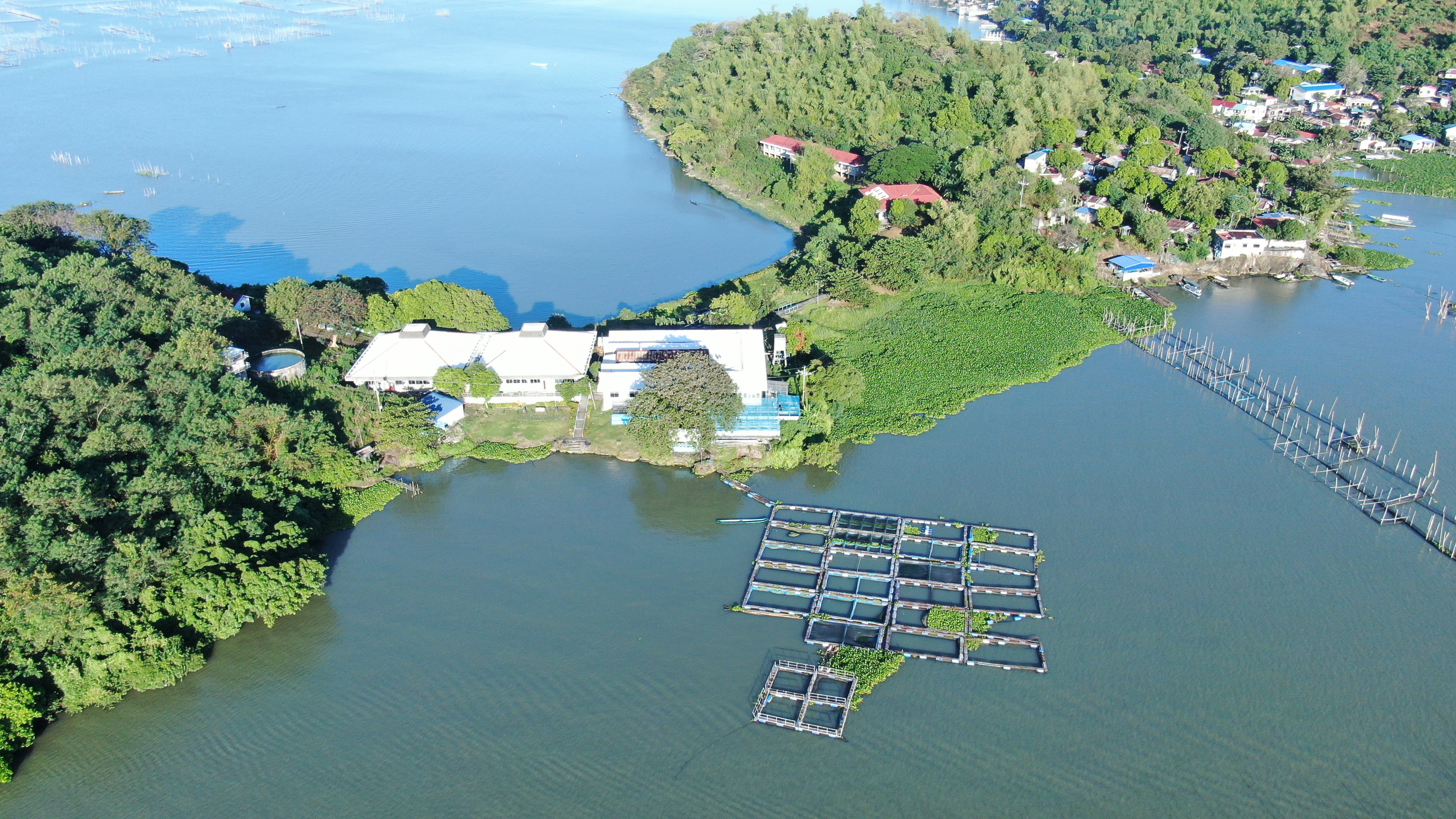
The Binangonan Freshwater Station of the Southeast Asian Fisheries Development Center Aquaculture Department at Tapao Point, Binangonan, Rizal.

=== Binangonan Freshwater Station ===
The Binangonan Freshwater Station (BFS) was established in 1976 and is located at Tapao Point in Binangonan, Rizal where it has a reserve area of 47.9 hectares. Located along the north shore of Laguna de Bay, the station has land and lake-based culture facilities that it used for research on freshwater species such as giant freshwater prawn, bighead carp, catfish, tilapia, and silver therapon. BFS also has laboratories to support research and production studies.

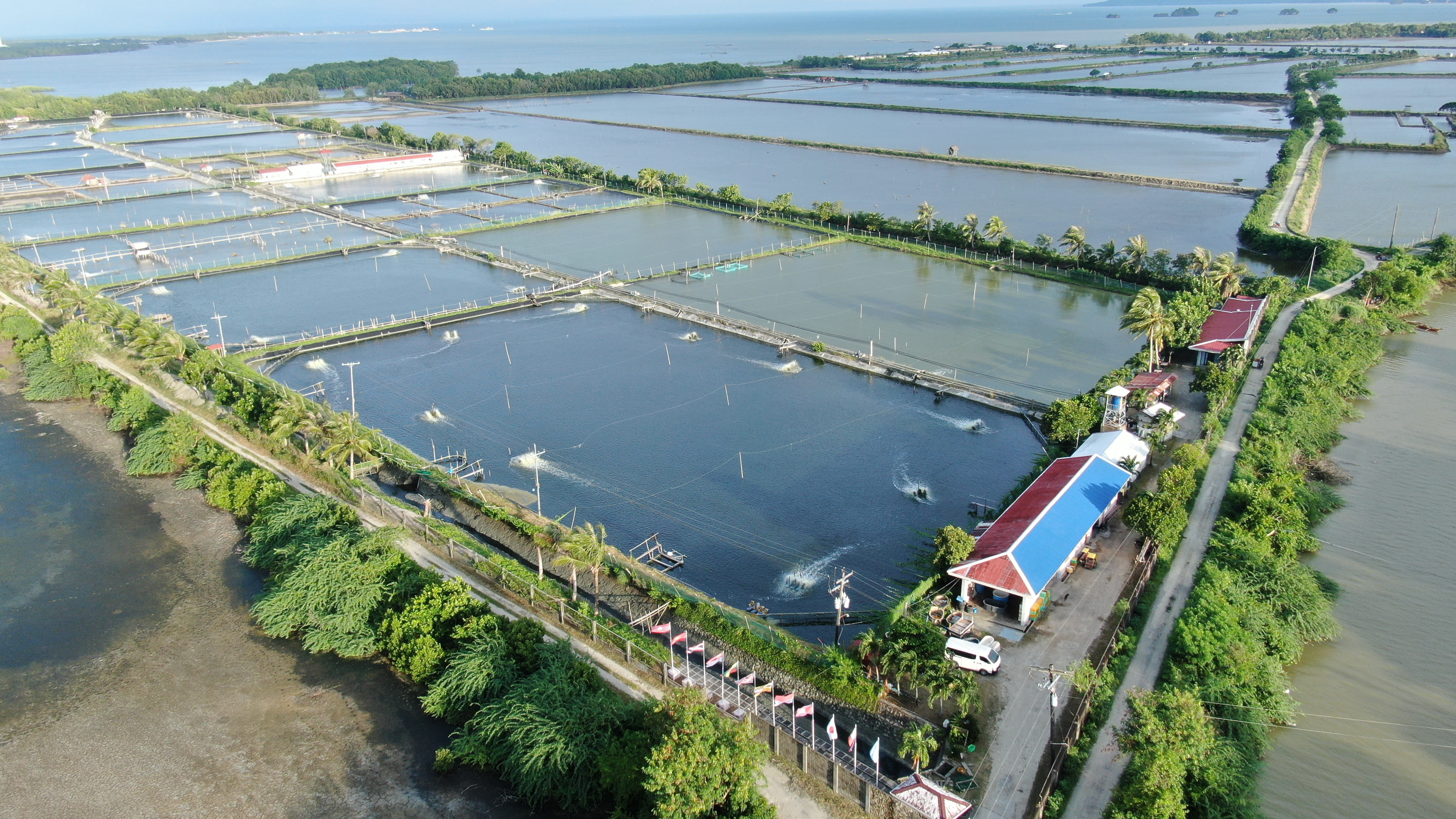
The Dumangas Brackishwater Station of the Southeast Asian Fisheries Development Center Aquaculture Department (SEAFDEC/AQD) in Dumangas, Iloilo, Philippines, as of September 2024.

=== Dumangas Brackishwater Station ===
The Dumangas Brackishwater Station is a 16-hectare pond area located in Dumangas, Iloilo. It serves as a technology verification, demonstration, and production facility for brackishwater species such as milkfish, shrimp, pompano, mangrove crab, snapper, sea bass, rabbitfish, and grouper. The area was donated by the Philippine’s Department of Agriculture to SEAFDEC/AQD in 1998.

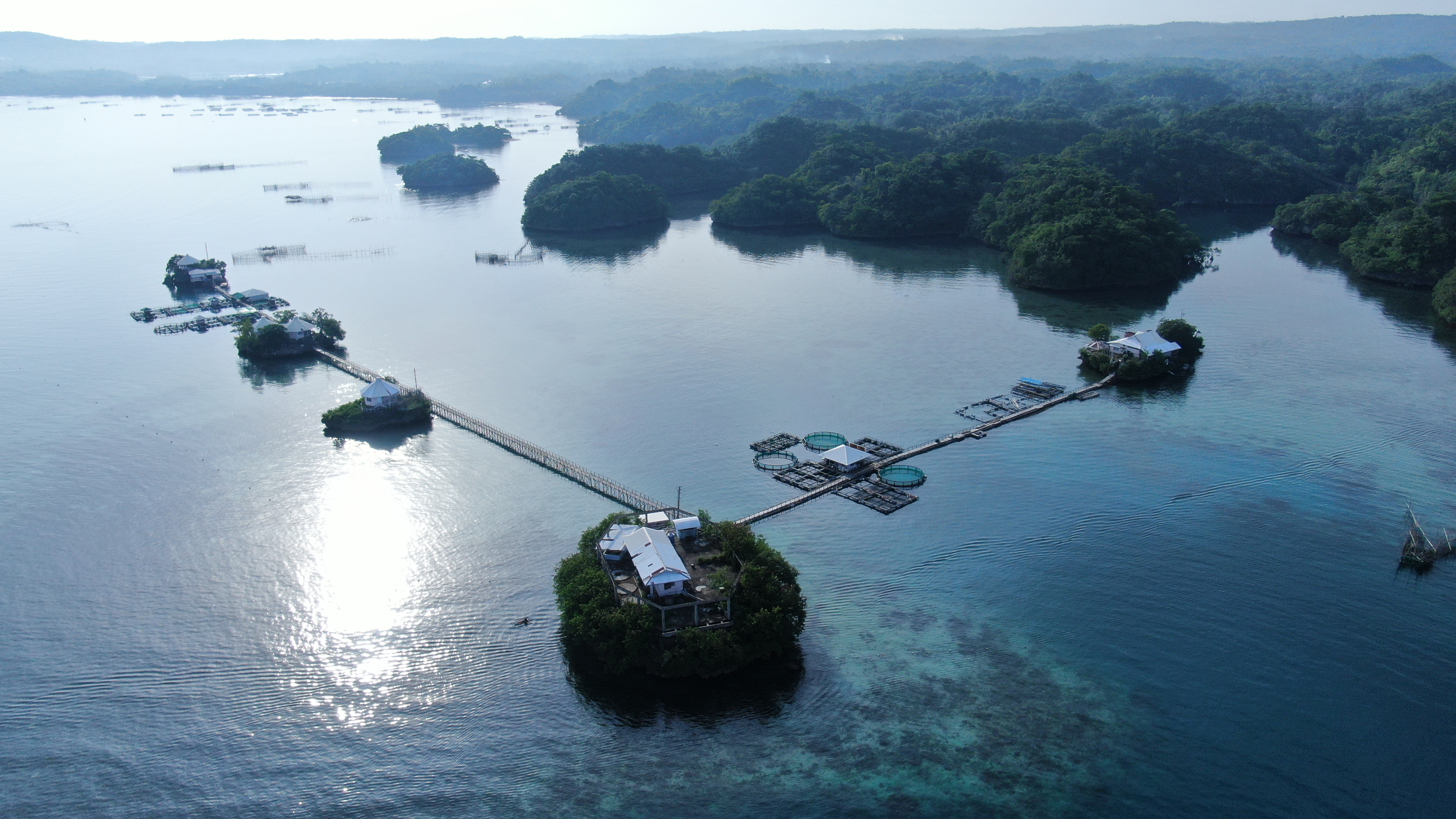
The Igang Marine Station of the Southeast Asian Fisheries Development Center Aquaculture Department (SEAFDEC/AQD) in Nueva Valencia, Guimaras.

=== Igang Marine Station ===
The Igang Marine Station (IMS) is composed of five islets and clusters of floating cages and sea pens within a cover in Nueva Valencia, Guimaras. The station was established in 1974 primarily for studies on the breeding of tiger shrimp in pens. Various floating and fixed-bottom enclosures facilities are used for research and production runs for fish, shellfish, seaweeds, and sea cucumbers. A giant clam garden, planted in 2006 for stock enhancement of the threatened species, is also located in the station.

Previously a popular tourist attraction in Guimaras, IMS has been closed to tourists since June 2018 to avoid disruptions in the spawning of fish breeders.

== Notable research milestones ==
In 1977, it was reported that SEAFDEC/AQD achieved the world's first artificial spawning of milkfish in 1977 by way of hormone injections. In 1983, hatchery-bred milkfish matured and spawned which marks the first time the milkfish life cycle was completed in captivity.

The world's first captive spawning of round scad (Decapterus macrosoma) was reportedly achieved and documented by SEAFDEC in 2021.
