= South Australian Research and Development Institute =

Research institute in South Australia

Coordinates: 34°58′09.2″S 138°38′18.83″E

The South Australian Research and Development Institute (SARDI) is the principal research institute of the Government of South Australia, with a network of research centres, laboratories and field sites both in metropolitan Adelaide and throughout South Australia. SARDI, whose head office is in the Waite Research Precinct is part of Primary Industries and Regions SA (PIRSA).

== Head office ==
The SARDI head office is located within the Plant Research Centre in the Waite Research Precinct, along with CSIRO, the Adelaide University's Waite Campus, and others, in the Adelaide suburb of Urrbrae, South Australia.

== Governance ==
SARDI is part of Primary Industries and Regions SA (PIRSA).

As of October 2025, marine biologist Mike Steer is chief executive of SARDI, having been appointed in September 2024.

== Units ==
=== South Australian Aquatic Sciences Centre ===
The South Australian Aquatic Sciences Centre (SAASC) is a purpose-built marine and freshwater research facility, housing SARDI's aquatic sciences research division. It works in partnership with a number of other research facilities. Its focus is marine and inland fisheries, aquaculture, marine biotechnology, and environmental and ecosystem ecology. It includes the Southern Australian Integrated Marine Observing System (SAIMOS) and Algae and Biofuel Facility, which are both part of the National Collaborative Research Infrastructure Strategy.

=== Regional centres ===
SARDI also operates through a number of regional centres, including:

- Aquatic Sciences Mount Gambier, at Mount Gambier, which focuses on the abalone and the rock lobster industries
- Clare and Port Lincoln Crop Improvement Centres, at Clare and Port Lincoln, which focus on agronomy, tillage, and seeding research
- Loxton Research Centre, Loxton, and Nuriootpa Research Centre, Nuriootpa, which focus on the viticulture, irrigated crops, and horticulture industries
- Lincoln Marine Science Centre, at Boston Bay, Port Lincoln, which focuses on aquaculture, aquatic industries, and marine environments
- Minnipa Agricultural Centre, Minnepa, which focuses on the cereal-growing areas of the Eyre Peninsula
- Roseworthy campus, Roseworthy, which focuses on dryland agriculture, natural resource management, veterinary science, and animal production
- South Australian Aquatic Biosecurity Centre, focusing on aquatic sciences
- Struan Research Centre, Struan, and Turretfield Research Centre at Rosedale, focusing on livestock, pasture, and crops research

== See also ==
- Network of Aquaculture Centres in Asia-Pacific
