= Fisheries College and Research Institute =

Indian research institute

Coordinates: 8.777051°N 78.1091°E

- Former name: Fisheries College
- Motto: "Learn Explore Succeed"
- Type: College
- Established: 1977
- Affiliations: Tamil Nadu Dr. J. Jayalalithaa Fisheries University
- Vice-Chancellor: N. Felix
- Dean: B. Sundaramoorthy
- Location: Thoothukudi, Tamil Nadu, India
- Campus: Urban ( outside city on harbourbypass road)
- Website: www.tnjfu.ac.in/fcritut www.tnjfu.ac.in

The Fisheries College and Research Institute (FCRI) is situated in Thoothukudi, Tamil Nadu, India.

== History ==
Fisheries College and Research Institute initially started as Fisheries College was established in the year 1977 as a constituent unit of Tamil Nadu Agricultural University at Thoothukkudi, a famed town for Pearl fishing. Thereby it became the first college in the state of Tamil Nadu and the second one in India (after College of Fisheries, Mangalore) to offer the Bachelor of Fisheries Science (B.F.Sc) degree in India. When the Tamil Nadu Veterinary and Animal Sciences University was carved out of the existing Tamil Nadu Agricultural University on 20 September 1989, the college was reaffiliated to the newly formed Tamil Nadu Veterinary and Animal Sciences University. The college was duly renamed as Fisheries College and Research Institute (FCRI) during the year 1990 in order to include its focus on research and extension. The college has now become an integral part of the newly established Tamil Nadu Fisheries University with its headquarters at Nagapattinam, Tamil Nadu.

== Campus ==
=== Location ===
FCRI functions from four campuses. The Main Campus of FCRI is about 10 km away from the city of Thoothukkudi and is spread over an area of 24 ha which is accessible through the Harbour Bypass Road. The Shore Laboratory Campus is separated from the main campus by a distance of 11 km, and is located within the Fishing Harbour Complex, Thoothukkudi over an area of 0.4 ha and is connected by the North Beach Road. Maritech Research & Extension Center is located on the outskirts of Tharuvaikulam, a fishing village which is 25 km away from the main campus, and facilitates research on mariculture activities. It is accessible through the familiar East Coast Road that runs along the coast of Tamil Nadu. There is a separate campus for residential purposes housing the staff quarters and hostel in an area of 1 ha which is 3 km away from the main campus and is located at the Teachers Colony, Thoothukkudi.

=== Infrastructure ===
The main campus has the administrative block, computer laboratory, ARIS cell, auditorium, conference hall, AV hall, examination hall, UG / PG classroom blocks, Library, Museum and e-learning laboratory.

==== Research centres and Farms ====
Research centres at the college include Fish Quality Monitoring and Certification Centre and Maritech Research Centre. The main campus of FC&RI has 2 ha of Earthen fish ponds, 2.70 ha area of reservoir, 31 freshwater prawn farms, Freshwater prawn hatchery, Carp hatchery, Glass hose aquarium and Shrimp Raceway system, catfish farm and hatchery, ornamental fish rearing facility and cryopreservation unit. The shore laboratory campus houses the facilities of fish processing and fishing technology. They include fish processing hall, fish canning unit, value added products preparation unit, packaging machineries, separate microbiology, biochemistry and quality control laboratories, marine workshop, net mending facility, navigation tools and marine bio laboratory. There is a small outboard engine fishing craft for conducting fishing. The Maritech Research & Extension center has the facilities for the culture of marine finfishes and shrimps in ponds and cages. Other facilities include Fishing training cum research vessel (Dolphin), Recirculatory Research Complex, Tilapia Rearing Complex, Fish cryo lab, Electrofisher, Fish deboner, Epifluroscent microscope, Shimadzu HPLC, ELISA reader, Gas Chromatography, GPS system, Atomic Absorption Spectrophotometer, Carbon analyser, Audio and Video Recording Room, PCR, Microbiology Laboratory, Virology Laboratory, Quality Control Laboratory, Value addition laboratory and Fish Engine Workshop.

==== Other facilities ====
The college has a library of 625 sqm with collection of 15000 books, journals and CD databases. It also has stack rooms for books, back volumes, periodical section, computer room, conference room, educational video hall, thesis section and reprography facilities. The college also has a fisheries museum with 600 specimens of finfishes, shellfishes, seaweeds, seagrasses, invertebrates, skeletons of marine animals, including whales and taxidermised specimens. The college has a play ground with facilities to play volleyball, basketball, football and cricket. An international indoor stadium with gymnasium and table tennis facilities are also available. The college has an Auditorium and Boys hostels in the main campus. The staff quarters campus has a ladies hostel, guest house with 40 rooms, the Dean’s mega bungalow and 5 blocks of teaching and non-teaching quarters. The college has a bus and two small canters to transport the students for the practical classes, field trips, shore laboratory campus and other official visits.

== Academics ==
The college has eight departments namely Aquaculture, Fisheries Biology and Resource management, Aquatic Environment Management, Fisheries Economics, Fish Processing Technology, Fishing Technology and Fisheries Engineering, Fisheries Extension and Fisheries Biotechnology.

=== Under graduation ===
The under graduation degree 'Bachelor of Fisheries Science' (B.F.Sc) is a four-year course. An academic year consists of two semesters each having 110 instructional days and the final year is exclusively devoted for training. The final year of the course consists of experiential program where the college provides funds and infrastructure to the students to carry out aquaculture or fish processing. It also involves an industry internship under Rural Awareness Work Experience (RAWE) programme. A total of 50 students are admitted for the programme including 8 students through All India Entrance Examination. This college adopted the ICAR common syllabus for B.F.Sc. programme from 2000–01.

=== Post graduation ===
The post graduate degree Master of Fisheries Science (M.F.Sc) is a two-year course offered in 10 disciplines: Aquaculture, Fisheries Resource Management, Fish Biotechnology, Fisheries Economics, Aquatic Environment Management, Fisheries Extension, Fisheries Engineering and Technology, Fish Processing Technology, Fish Quality Assurance and Management and Biostatistics. The candidates possessing B.F.Sc. degree are eligible for admission through a common entrance test conducted by the University. This college adopted the ICAR common syllabus for M.F.Sc. programme from 2011–12. The programme has 55 total credits including 1 credit for seminar and 15 credits for research.

=== Doctoral Program ===
The Doctor of Philosophy (PhD) is a three-year course offered in 4 disciplines: Aquaculture, Fisheries Resource Management, Aquatic Environment Management, Fisheries Economics and Fish Processing Technology. The Ph.D. programmes are being offered in regular and part-time mode. The candidates possessing basic B.F.Sc. degree are eligible for admission through a common entrance test conducted by the University. The programme has 75 total credits including 2 credits for seminar and 45 credits for research.

=== PG Diploma ===
One year Post-graduate Diploma is offered in Fish Quality Management and Business management in Animal and Fisheries Sciences. The candidates possessing B.F.Sc., B.V.Sc.&A.H., B.Sc. (Dairy Science), B.Sc. (Agriculture), B.Sc. (Horticulture), B.Sc. (Home Science of 4 years duration) and B. Tech. (Food Technology/Food Processing Technology) or M.Sc. in Food Science/ Microbiology/ Biotechnology/ Biochemistry/ Zoology/ Marine Biology/ Coastal Aquaculture/ Home Science degree are eligible for admission. The admission to this programme is through a common entrance test conducted by the University.

=== M.Phil ===
- Climate Change and Fisheries. Any master's degree with Science background with a minimum of 60% marks in aggregate for general category and a minimum of pass for SC / ST candidates are eligible for admission.

== Research and training ==
The college has developed a low cost cage-based technology for open water fish culture. The college has also organized a training program for the local farmers in using the technology. The institute also conducts regular training programs for fishermen, fish farmers and fish processors.
