= Australian Institute of Marine Science =

Australian tropical marine research centre

Coordinates: 19.2676°S 147.0558°E

Agency overview
- Formed: 1972
- Employees: 354
- Annual budget: A$ 137 million (2024)
- Agency executive: Professor Selina Stead, CEO
- Website: https://www.aims.gov.au

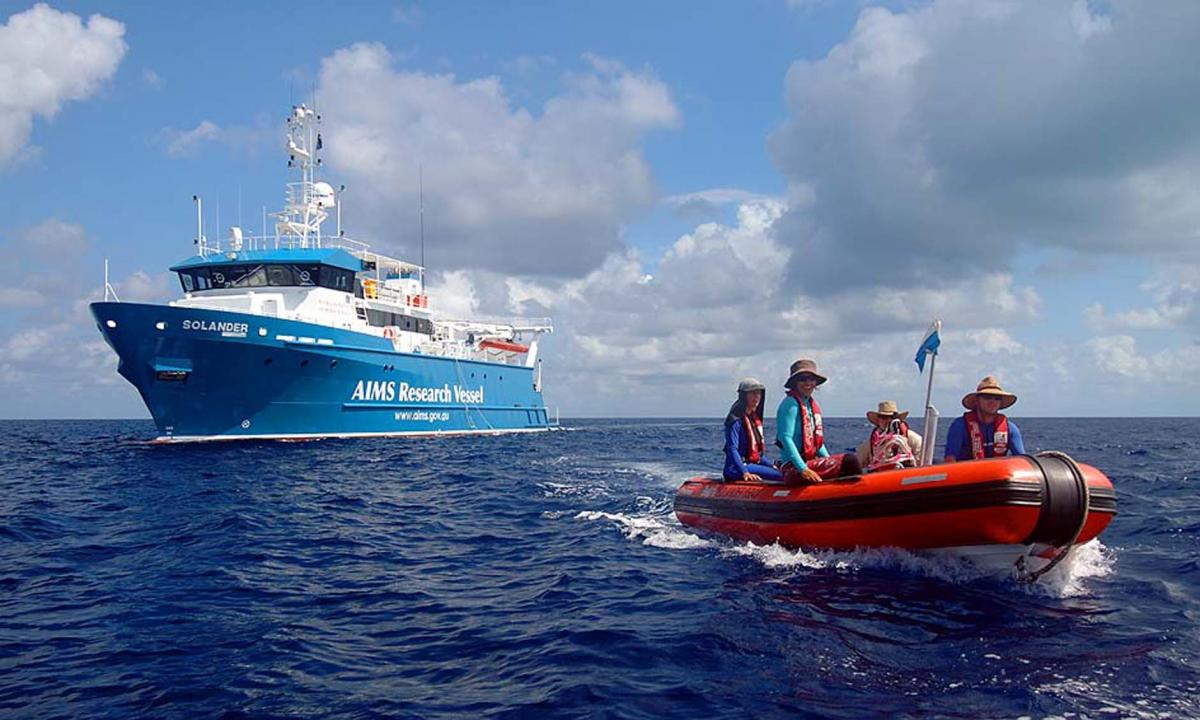
Tender departing the RV Solander, one of the research vessels at the Australian Institute of Marine Science

The Australian Institute of Marine Science (AIMS) is a tropical marine research centre located primarily at Cape Ferguson in the locality of Cape Cleveland, Queensland, Australia. It is around 50 kilometres (31 mi) from Townsville.

== History ==
The Australian Institute of Marine Science (AIMS) was established in 1972 by the McMahon government.

In September 1973, The Townsville Daily Bulletin noted that a proposed site south of Townsville was "virtually certain" to be that chosen for the complex, which would "be Australia's largest marine science institute", and expected to cost "between $7 million and $8 million".

== Description ==
The institute's primary function is research for sustainable use and protection of the marine environment. The Institute investigates topics from broad-scale ecology to microbiology.

AIMS is committed to the protection and sustainable use of Australia's marine resources. Its research programs support the management of tropical marine environments around the world, with a primary focus on the Great Barrier Reef World Heritage Area, the pristine Ningaloo Marine Park in Western Australia and northwest Australia.

Areas of research include climate change, coral bleaching, dredging, marine microplastics, ocean acidification, in addition to the monitoring of water quality, sea temperature, various Australian reefs, and marine life.

AIMS' headquarters are located on a 207-hectare coastal site 50 km from Townsville, Queensland, in a scientific zone surrounded by National Park and Marine Reserve. The location was selected because of its proximity to the geographical centre of the Great Barrier Reef and access to clean seawater. This strategic position provides a fast transition from the sea to the laboratory, a key advantage in marine science.

Two smaller offices, in Perth, Western Australia, and Darwin, Northern Territory, provide direct links for research partners and clients in these regions.

The institute is accountable to the Minister for the Environment and Water.

== Marine science developments ==
AIMS is a part of an Australia-wide focus of marine science investment projects to improve: technologies, infrastructure and response systems to Australian marine issues. As part of a Super Science Initiative, Australia back in 2012 invested AUD$387.7 million in marine and climate science to boost protection and response systems for the undersea realm (Coffin, 2012).

The Institute discovered the oldest tropical fish, a midnight snapper, in December 2020. It was determined to be 81 years old.

== See also ==
- Network of Aquaculture Centres in Asia-Pacific
- Nicole Webster
