= Thalainayar =

Thalaignayiru
- Town
- Location in Tamil Nadu, India
- Coordinates: 10.5667°N 79.7667°E
- Country: India
- State: Tamil Nadu
- District: Nagapattinam

Population (2011)
  - Total: 12,798 of which 6,269 are males while 6,529

Languages
  - Official: Tamil
- Time zone: UTC+5:30 (IST)

Thalainayar (also referred to as Talanayar) is a panchayat town in Nagapattinam district in the Indian state of Tamil Nadu. It is near Vedaranyam. It is famous for its Agraharam street, which has a Ram and Siva temple.

== Revenue villages ==
- Thalainayar first sethi
- Thalainayar Second sethi
- Thalainayar Third sethi
- Thalainayar fourth sethi
- Thalainayar fifth sethi
- Thalainayar Agraharam
- Pirinjumulai
- Thirumalam

== Transport ==
It is connected to lot of major towns like Thiruvarur, Mannargudi, Thiruthuraipoondi, Pattukkottai, Vailankanni, Nagapattinam, Vedaranyam and Kodikkarai.

Its well connected through newly built ECR (East Coast Road) between Chennai and Thoothukudi aka Tuticorin. There are direct buses to Coimbatore.
