= Indian carp =

Indian carp or Indian major carp is a common name for several species of fish:

- Catla catla or catla. It is an economically important South Asian freshwater fish of the carp family
- Cirrhinus cirrhosus or mrigal, a ray-finned fish of the carp family native to rivers in India
- Labeo rohita, the rohu (rui), a fish of the carp family found in rivers in South Asia

== See also ==
- Asian carp
