= Department of Animal Husbandry, Dairying and Fisheries (Tamil Nadu) =

Indian state government agency

Agency overview
- Formed: 1811; 215 years ago
- Jurisdiction: Tamil Nadu
- Headquarters: Chennai
- Ministers responsible: Srinath, Minister for Fisheries – Fishermen Welfare; S. Kamali, Minister for Animal Husbandry; C. Vijayalakshmi, Minister for Milk and Dairy Development
- Agency executive: Mangat Ram Sharma, IAS, Additional Chief Secretary to the Government
- Website: Department of Animal Husbandry, Dairying and Fisheries

The Department of Animal Husbandry, Dairying and Fisheries is one of the departments of Government of Tamil Nadu. The departments encompasses the departments of animal husbandry, fisheries, milk production and dairying.

== Animal husbandry ==
Animal husbandry department is responsible for providing veterinary healthcare and improving the production of livestock and poultry in Tamil Nadu, thereby ensuring the production of animal produce such as meat, eggs and milk. It is the nodal agency responsible for the implementation of welfare schemes for the distribution of livestock support. As of 2022, the state is a largest producer of poultry and eggs with an annual production of 20.8 billion units, contributing to more than 16% of the national output. The department administers census and registration of livestock. The department manages veterinary education and research institutes of Tamil Nadu Veterinary and Animal Sciences University (TANUVAS) and Institute of Veterinary Preventive Medicine. The Tamil Nadu Livestock Development Agency (TNLDA) is involved in improving the genetic production potential of livestock and poultry.

== Fisheries ==
As of 2023, the state has a fishermen population of 1.05 million and the coast consists of 3 major fishing harbors, 3 medium fishing harbors and 363 fish landing centers. As of 2022, the fishing output was 0.8 million tonnes with a contribution of 5% to the total fish production in India. Aquaculture include shrimp, sea weed, mussel, clam and oyster farming across more than 6000 hectares. The department of fisheries is responsible for protecting the fishing rights, enabling deep sea fishing, facilitating infrastructure related to fishing such as harbors and landing centers, processing and marketing, implementation of welfare schemes for fishermen and protecting the ecosystem. Tamil Nadu Fisheries Development Corporation Limited (TNFDC) is involved in development and management of fishing ecosystems and infrastructure. Tamil Nadu State Apex Fisheries Cooperative Federation Limited (TAFCOFED) is responsible for marketing of fisheries and produce. Tamil Nadu Fishermen Welfare Board is the nodal agency for implementing welfare schemes for fishermen. Tamil Nadu Fisheries University is the primary research and educational institute for fisheries.

== Dairy development ==
Tamil Nadu ranks eighth in milk production and the department is responsible for production and processing of milk and other dairy products. Tamil Nadu, Tamil Nadu Cooperative Milk Producers’ Federation Limited (Aavin) is the nodal agency for the procurement, processing and marketing of milk and milk products.

== Ministers ==
Fisheries

- Srinath (2026-present)
- Anitha R. Radhakrishnan (2021-26)
- D. Jayakumar (2016-21)
- K. A. Jayapal (2011-16)

Animal Husbandry

- S. Kamali (2026-present)
- Anitha R. Radhakrishnan (2021-26)
- K. Radhakrishnan (2017-21)
- P. Balakrishna Reddy (2016-17)
- T. K. M. Chinnayya (2011-16)

Milk and Dairying

- C. Vijayalakshmi (2026-present)
- Mano Thangaraj (2021-26)
- K. T. Rajenthra Bhalaji (2016-21)
- V. Moorthy (2011-16)
- U. Mathivanan (2006-11)

== See also ==
- Government of Tamil Nadu
- Tamil Nadu Government's Departments
