= Central Inland Fisheries Research Institute =

Indian research institute

- logo of CIFRI
- Type: Central Research Institute
- Established: 1947; 79 years ago
- Affiliations: ICAR; CIFR
- Director: Dr. B. K. Das
- Location: Barrackpore,, West Bengal, India; 26.1366°N 91.7898°E
- Campus: Urban
- Website: www.cifri.res.in

Central Inland Fisheries Research Institute (CIFRI) is an autonomous research institute dedicated to inland fisheries management and augmentation under the Indian Council of Agricultural Research of Government of India.

It was established on 17 March 1947 as the Central Inland Fisheries Research Station at Kolkata, under the Ministry of Agriculture, Government of India. In 1959 this research station was elevated to the status of "Central Inland Fisheries Research Institute, and moved to its own building at Barrackpore. In 1967 the institute came under the administrative control of the Indian Council of Agricultural Research (ICAR), New Delhi.
