= Tamil Nadu Fisheries University =

Government university in India

Tamil Nadu Dr. J. Jayalalithaa Fisheries University
- Former name: Tamil Nadu Fisheries University
- Motto: Educate, Innovate, Elevate
- Type: Public
- Established: 2012; 14 years ago
- Founder: J. Jayalalithaa
- Affiliations: UGC
- Chancellor: Governor of Tamil Nadu
- Vice-Chancellor: Dr. N. Felix
- Location: Nagapattinam, Tamil Nadu, India; 10.7617°N 79.8486°E
- Campus: Urban
- Website: www.tnjfu.ac.in

Tamil Nadu Dr. J. Jayalalithaa Fisheries University (TNJFU), formerly and commonly known as Tamil Nadu Fisheries University (TNFU), is a government fisheries university situated in Vettar River View Campus in the southern part of the city of Nagapattinam, Tamil Nadu, India. It is about 10 km (6.2 mi) from the Nagapattinam Junction Railway Station and about 8 km (5.0 mi) from the Nagapattinam Bus Stand. It is one of the premier fisheries universities named after the former Chief Minister of Tamil Nadu J. Jayalalithaa. It has its jurisdiction over whole state of Tamil Nadu.

== History ==
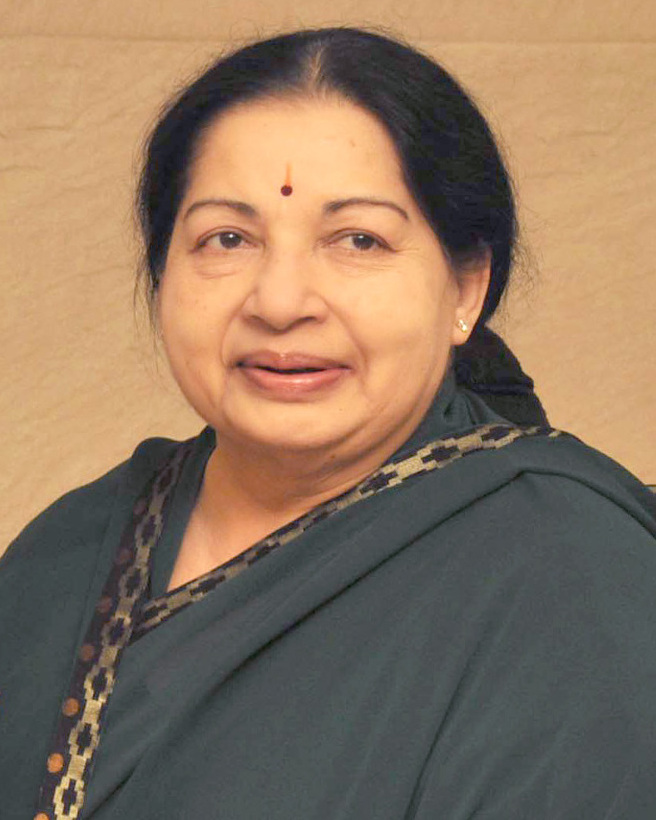
J. Jayalalithaa

The members of the High Level Committee of fisheries submitted the proposals to the former Chief Minister of Tamil Nadu J. Jayalalithaa in the presence of M. Radhakrishnan, former Minister for Fisheries Department of Tamil Nadu in 2012 to start a separate fisheries university in Tamil Nadu.

Tamil Nadu Fisheries University Act, 2012 received the assent of the former President of the Republic of India Pranab Mukherjee in 2012. The Fisheries College and Research Institute, Thoothukudi functioning Under The Tamil Nadu Agricultural University's Faculty of Fishery sciences was converted to a Separate University, The First State Fisheries university was established, exclusively for Fisheries. This affiliating University started functioning from July 2012 and is governed by the said Act. By 2017, It was named after the former Chief Minister of Tamil Nadu J. Jayalalithaa through Tamil Nadu Dr. J. Jayalalithaa Fisheries University, Chennai Act, 2017.

== Administration ==
The Chancellor and Pro-chancellor of the university are the Governor and the Minister for Fisheries Department of Tamil Nadu respectively. The Vice-Chancellor is the main academic officer and administrator in its everyday functioning of the university who is appointed by the Government of Tamil Nadu.

== Constituent colleges ==
TNJFU has nine constituent colleges:

- Fisheries College and Research Institute, Thoothukudi
- Dr. M.G.R. Fisheries College and Research Institute, Ponneri
- Dr. M.G.R Fisheries College and Research Institute, Thalainayeru
- College of Fisheries Engineering, Nagapattinam
- Institute of Fisheries Post Graduate Studies, Vaniyanchavadi, OMR, Chennai
- Institute of Fisheries Biotechnology, Vaniyanchavadi, OMR, Chennai
- TNJFU - Business School (Fisheries), Vaniyanchavadi, OMR, Chennai
- College of Fish Nutrition and Food Technology, Madhavaram, Chennai
- College of Fisheries Nautical Technology, Thoothukudi

== See also ==
- College of Fisheries Science and Research Centre, Etawah
- Fisheries College and Research Institute
