= Southeast Asian Fisheries Development Center =

- Abbreviation: SEAFDEC
- Formation: 1967
- Type: intergovernmental organization
- Headquarters: Bangkok
- Location: Thailand
- Region served: Southeast Asia
- Members: Brunei; Cambodia; Indonesia; Japan; Laos; Malaysia; Myanmar; Philippines; Singapore; Thailand; Vietnam
- Official language: English
- Website: www.seafdec.org

The Southeast Asian Fisheries Development Center (SEAFDEC) is an autonomous inter-governmental body established in 1967. The mission of SEAFDEC considered and adopted by the Special Meeting of the SEAFDEC Council 2017 is “To promote and facilitate concerted actions among the Member Countries to ensure the sustainability of fisheries and aquaculture in Southeast Asia.”

SEAFDEC comprises 11 Member Countries: Brunei Darussalam, Cambodia, Indonesia, Japan, Lao PDR, Malaysia, Myanmar, Philippines, Singapore, Thailand, and Vietnam. The Center operates through the Secretariat located in Thailand and has five Technical Departments, namely: the Training Department (TD) in Thailand, the Marine Fisheries Research Department (MFRD) in Singapore, the Aquaculture Department (AQD) in the Philippines, and the Marine Fishery Resources Development and Management Department (MFRDMD) in Malaysia, Inland Fishery Resources Development and Management Department (IFRDMD) in Indonesia.
