= Blue revolution =

Era of growth in aquaculture, 1960s–2000s

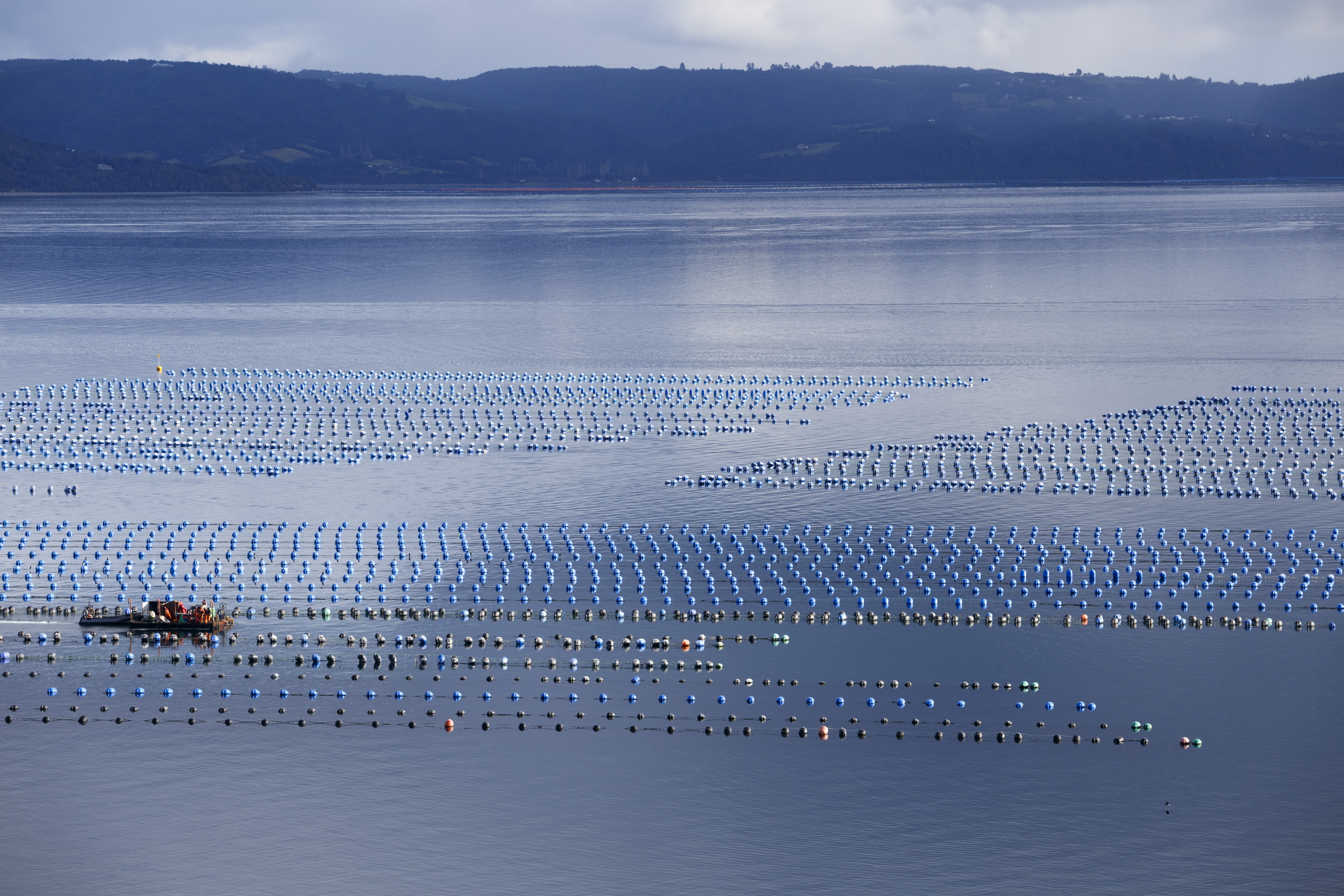
Mussel farming center in Yal channel, off Lemuy Island, Chiloé archipelago, Chile.

World aquaculture production of food fish and aquatic plants, 1990–2016, from: In brief, The State of World Fisheries and Aquaculture, 2018. Food and Agriculture Organization (FAO).

The Blue Revolution refers to the significant growth and intensification of global aquaculture production—domestication and farming of fish, shellfish, and aquatic plants—from the middle of the 20th century to the present, particularly in underdeveloped countries. The peak and subsequent stagnation of capture fishery production in the late 1980s spurred technological innovation and improved efficiency for aquaculture production.

Since then, aquaculture has grown exponentially and now represents the main source of global fish supply for direct human consumption and other purposes, and is a critical part of the global food system. The Blue Revolution and expansion of aquaculture is expected to continue to grow, increasing by approximately 30% by 2030 from current levels.

== What is the Blue Revolution? ==
The Blue Revolution is the increase in fish and aquatic food production through the sustainable use of water resources, including marine, brackish, and freshwater systems. It encompasses activities like aquaculture (fish farming), the development of fisheries, and the sustainable management of aquatic ecosystems to provide food security, employment, and economic growth. The Blue Revolution involves scientific advancements, policy initiatives, and practical strategies to harness water resources for producing fish and aquatic plants. It emphasizes balancing increased production with environmental conservation.

== Characteristics of the Blue Revolution ==
Expansion of Aquaculture: Cultivation of fish, prawns, crabs, mollusks, and aquatic plants like seaweed in controlled environments. Marine and Inland Fisheries: Enhancing the efficiency and sustainability of harvesting fish from oceans, rivers, and lakes. Scientific Innovation: Use of advanced breeding techniques, water management, feed development, and disease control. Economic Growth: Creation of industries around fish farming, processing, storage, and export. Sustainability: Addressing issues like overfishing, habitat destruction, and pollution to protect aquatic ecosystems.

== Emergence of the Blue Revolution ==
Aquaculture production by region (2020), Our World in Data

Prior to the 1980s, global fish supply from aquaculture did not represent a significant food source. However, depletion of ocean fisheries and subsequent decline of capture fishery production caused aquaculture to grow rapidly. From the mid-1980s to 2000, global aquaculture production increased by more than 50%, and cemented itself as a significant source for global fish supply. Since 2000, aquaculture has been the fastest growing food production sector, growing 5.8% per year, supplying over 100 metric tonnes of fish, shellfish and seaweeds from 425 species in 2017.

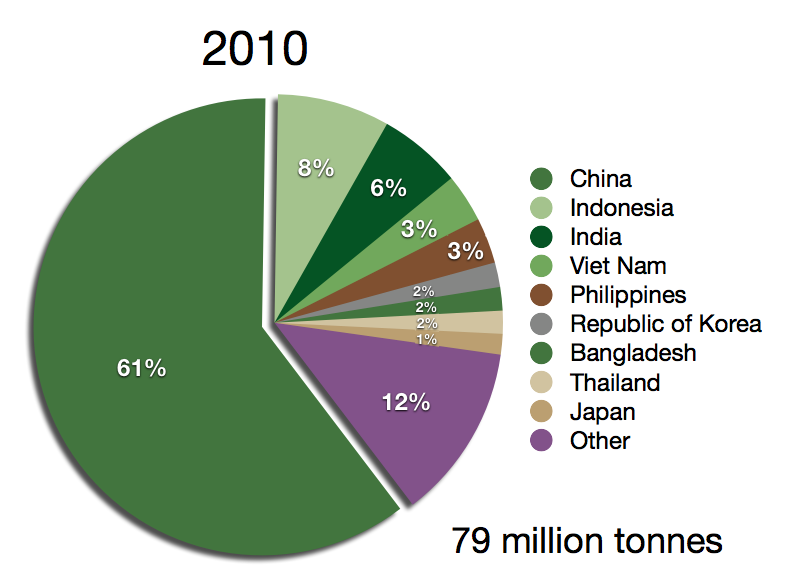
Global aquaculture production by country in million tonnes, 1950–2010, as reported by the FAO. Based on data sourced from the FishStat database.

The Blue Revolution was initially concentrated in Asia, and China in particular. Aquaculture in Asian countries continues to dominate, accounting for 89% of global aquaculture production, with China alone accounts for 58% of global production. However, it is also intensifying in other regions, with growth rates in South America, and more recently Africa, outpacing China.

The Blue Revolution has driven and supported global increase in global fish consumption since the 1980s. Over the last several decades, global fish consumption has increased 3.1% per year, and is primarily supplied through aquaculture.

=== Freshwater aquaculture ===
The Blue Revolution over the last two decades has increasingly been shaped by growth in freshwater aquaculture. Freshwater aquaculture, such as inland farming in rivers and lakes, is now the most significant contributor to aquaculture, and accounts for the majority supply of fish for direct human consumption. South and Southeast Asia are the largest producers of freshwater aquaculture.

Rather than for export, freshwater aquaculture is largely produced for domestic use and consumption. This has the potential to increase availability and accessibility of fish, but also presents challenges in terms of over-intensification, pollution of water sources, and introduction of diseases.

== Potential benefits of the Blue Revolution ==
=== Food and nutrient security ===
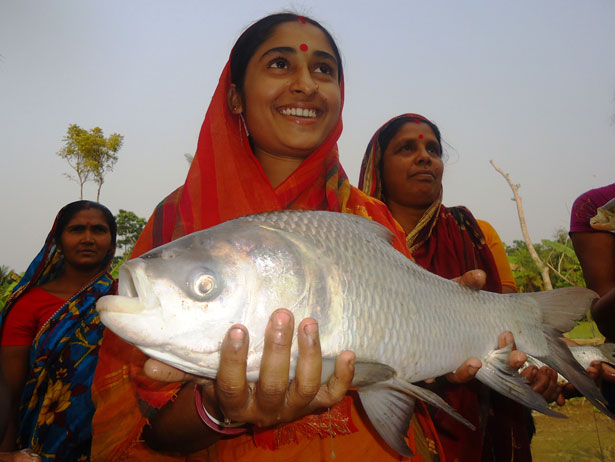
Women-operated aquaculture in Bangladesh

The Blue Revolution has improved accessibility and availability of farmed fish in some regions, therefore potentially improving food and nutrient security, especially in low-income nations and rural populations.

Increased aquaculture production has enabled a reliable fish supply that is more stable than wild fish catches. Further, aquaculture's boom has driven down the price of most farmed species, making them more affordable for low-income households. Meanwhile, reduced wild fish stocks has increased the price of fish from other fishing industries and practices. In recent decades, aquaculture in underdeveloped countries has mostly gone towards domestic consumption, rather than international trade. Reduced prices and year-long predictable supply has allowed food insecure regions with high aquaculture production to improve food conditions for some of their most vulnerable populations.

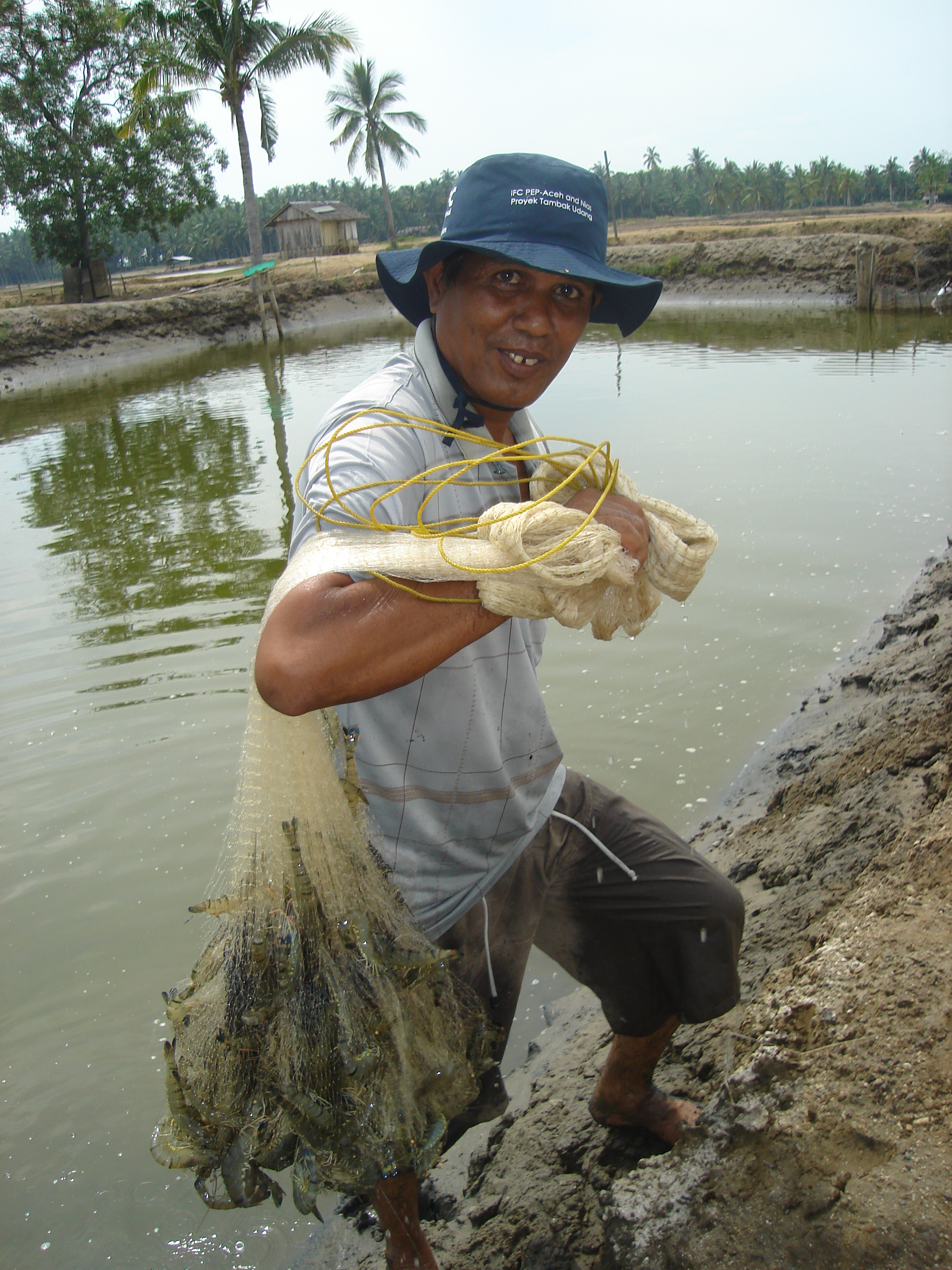
A farmer brings in a netful of Acehnese Monodon prawns.

Fish for direct human consumption are an excellent source for many important nutrients, such as omega 3-fatty acids, iodine, vitamin D, iron and calcium. Fish are also a significant source of protein for much of the global population, providing over 3 billion people with about 20% of their animal protein. In small-island states, and West Africa, fish provides up to 50% of protein intake. Increased consumption of fish from the Blue Revolution can ameliorate conditions of nutrient deficiencies in low-income malnourished populations in underdeveloped regions. However, in some regions, such as Africa, fish consumption is expected to decrease in coming decades, potentially threatening food and nutrient security in existing vulnerable groups.

== Livelihoods and poverty alleviation ==
The Blue Revolution and aquaculture activities play an important role in supporting livelihoods and reducing poverty, especially for rural populations. In 2018, over 20 million people globally were employed and got their income from aquaculture related activities. Generally, aquaculture can provide a higher income to low-income, rural households than agriculture. In underdeveloped countries, many people rely on income from seafood production to support their livelihoods in addition to other sources of income. This is especially true for small-scale aquaculture, which is most often practiced in rural areas.

Aquaculture also as positive indirect effects of poverty alleviation through spill-over from surplus income and employment linkages to those in jobs associated with fish farming. The growth of freshwater aquaculture has helped provide income and reduce poverty, specifically in Asia and sub-Saharan Africa. Fish farming also has positive effects on income distribution, attenuating the levels of inequality in rural coastal localities where salmon farms are established, compared to localities where salmon farms are not established. For example, in Bangladesh, aquaculture activities facilitate per capita income to grow 2.1% between 2000 and 2010, reducing national poverty levels.

== India and the Blue Revolution ==
In India, the Blue Revolution refers to government-led efforts to increase fish production through modern aquaculture techniques and improved fisheries management.

Key Developments: Fish Farmers Development Agencies (FFDAs): Established to support fish farmers with training and resources. Neel Kranti Mission: Aimed at doubling fish production in India sustainably. PM Matsya Sampada Yojana (2020): Focused on modernizing fisheries, creating infrastructure, and improving exports. Achievements: India is the second-largest fish producer in the world. Significant growth in shrimp farming and inland aquaculture.

== See also ==
- Aquaculture
- Green revolution
- Food security
