= Chandra Shekhar Azad University of Agriculture and Technology =

Agricultural university in Uttar Pradesh, India

Chandra Shekhar Azad University of Agriculture & Technology
- Type: State University (Government)
- Established: 1975 (51 years ago)
- Accreditation: NAAC B+
- Affiliations: ICAR, UGC
- Chancellor: Governor of Uttar Pradesh
- Vice-Chancellor: Dr. Sanjeev Gupta
- Location: Kanpur, Uttar Pradesh, India; 26.49122°N 80.307012°E
- Campus: Urban
- Website: www.csauk.ac.in

Chandra Shekhar Azad University of Agriculture & Technology (CSAUA&T) is an agricultural university at Kanpur in the Indian state of Uttar Pradesh. It is named after the Indian revolutionary Chandrashekhar Azad. Besides Kanpur, it also has constituent colleges (also known as campuses) in Etawah, Hardoi and Lakhimpur Kheri district. The university caters to the needs of the farming community of 29 districts of Uttar Pradesh.

== History ==
A small school was started in 1893 at Kanpur to provide training to revenue officers. It gradually grew to the status of a Government Agricultural College (1906), the U.P. Institute of Agricultural Sciences (1969) and a full-fledged university in 1975. U.P. College of Veterinary Science & Animal Husbandry, Mathura was merged with the university at that time.

== Colleges ==
The university comprises eight colleges:

- In Kanpur: College of Agriculture, College of Home Science, College of Forestry, College of Horticulture,
- In Etawah: Baba Saheb Dr. Bhim Rao Ambedkar College of Agricultural Engineering and Technology, College of Dairy Technology, College of Fisheries, and
- two other in Hardoi and Lakhimpur Kheri district: College of Agriculture.

== Admission policy ==
Students are admitted to the undergraduate programme through UPCATET (Uttar Pradesh Combined Agriculture & Technology Entrance Test) conducted by Agriculture Universities one by one of UP, Govt. of Uttar Pradesh and CUET (Common Universities Entrance Test). Seats are allotted according to the merit of the students in UPCATET and their choice at the time of counselling 2008-09 onward students are taken through UPCATET and CUET. Now this year for 2020-21 session this Entrance exam is conducted by CSAUA&T, Kanpur.

== Research ==
The extensive research effort in the university takes place under director of the Agricultural Research Station. It is divided into the following research sections:

- Economic Botanist (Rabi Cereals) established in 1904 as the first Economic Botanist of India (along with Lyallpur, now in Pakistan).
- Barley Section
- Economic Botanist (Legumes)
- Economic Botanist (Oilseed)

The university has developed and released more than 150 early maturing, high yielding, and disease/insect resistant crop varieties/hybrids of cereals, pulses, oilseeds, vegetables, cotton, 29 of these in the last three years. It has contributed to the evolution of agro-techniques suited individual situations.

== Extension ==
The university provides training to farmers and officials in agricultural technologies. An Agricultural Technology Information Centre at the main gate provides information to the farmers in the region.

== Notable alumni ==
- Kishan Singh, plant pathologist and Shanti Swarup Bhatnagar Prize recipient
- Hargovind Bhargava, ex-MLA
