= College of Fisheries, Mangalore =

Education and research institute in India

College of Fisheries, Mangaluru
- Type: under graduate and Postgraduate institute
- Established: 1969
- Dean: Dr. Anjanayappa H.N (Fisheries)
- Students: about 300
- Undergraduates: 170
- Postgraduates: 55
- Doctoral students: 26
- Location: [Mangaluru]], Yekkur, Mangaluru, HoigeBazaar
- Campus: Residential
- Working languages: English and Kannada
- Website: cofm.edu.in

The College of Fisheries, Mangalore, Karnataka is a fisheries education and research institute in India. It was established in 1969 by the University of Agricultural Sciences, Bangalore. The college has become part of the newly established Karnataka Veterinary, Animal and Fisheries Sciences University, Bidar.

== Campuses ==
The college has twin campuses. The main campus with administrative block, library, Aquaculture, Fishery Microbiology, Fisheries Resources and Management and Fisheries Environment and Ecology departments, hostels (for men and women), training centre, guest house, auditorium, sports complex, swimming pool, post office and bank is at Yekkur, Kankanady, Mangalore on NH 17.

The Technology Wing is at Hoige Bazar on the mouth of the Nethravathi River close to Arabian Sea and has Departments of Fish Processing Technology and Fishery Engineering.

== Education ==
The College offers B.F.Sc, M.F.Sc and Ph.D. programs in Fisheries Sciences. The M.F.Sc. and Ph.D. programs have been offered in different branches: Aquaculture, Fishery Microbiology, Fish Processing Technology, Fisheries Resources and Management, aquatic environment and management and fisheries engineering.

== College of Fisheries Alumni Association (COFAA) ==
College of Fisheries Alumni Association (COFAA) started in 1980 by a group of like-minded alumni led by R N Ramachandra under the guidance of Prof. H P C Shetty has been enjoying patronage and support from its members. Over 1300 graduates passed out from the portals of the college are contributing significantly for the development of the association and the institute. Over the last 30 years the COFAA has undergone a metamorphosis with its own office building cum guest house on the campus.

== Fishco Festival ==
The student association of the college organizes the Fishco Festival every year. Forty colleges from Udupi and Dakshina Kannada districts participate. The three-day event comprises fine arts, literary, and cultural competitions.

== See also ==
- College of Fisheries Science and Research Centre, Etawah
