= Central Institute of Fisheries Education =

ICAR-CIFE, a research institute in Mumbai, India

- Type: Deemed University
- Established: 6 June 1961; 65 years ago
- Affiliations: UGC, ICAR
- Director: Dr. N. P. Sahu
- Location: Mumbai, Maharashtra, India
- Campus: Urban
- Website: www.cife.edu.in/index.html

The Central Institute of Fisheries Education (CIFE) is a Deemed to be a University and institution of higher learning for fisheries science in Mumbai, India. It was ranked 9th in India by the National Institutional Ranking Framework in the agriculture and allied sectors ranking for 2024.

The institute is one of four deemed to be universities operating under the Indian Council for Agricultural Research (ICAR); the other three being the Indian Veterinary Research Institute (IVRI), the National Dairy Research Institute (NDRI) and the Indian Agriculture Research Institute (IARI)

A total of five centres operate under CIFE, including ones at the ICAR CIFE Rohtak centre at Rohtak in Haryana state, Kolkata in West Bengal state, Kakinada in Andhra Pradesh state, Pawarkheda in Madhya Pradesh state and Motihari in Bihar state.

== History ==
CIFE was instituted in 1961 originally as an in service training centre to impart proficient training and education to fisheries professionals to equip them to face the growing challenges in the fisheries sector. Taking its efforts of almost twenty years into consideration, CIFE came under the administrative control of the Indian Council for Agricultural Research. It was then conferred Deemed University status in 1989 by the University Grants Commission. As such, CIFE incorporated provisions for both research and education in its mandate. It has since made significant contributions towards enriching the quality of fisheries education in India. As per the letter dated 10 November - 2017, University Grants Commission, the higher education authority, the word University has been dropped from the CIFE name and it was replaced by Deemed to be university.

== Education programs ==
CIFE offers Master of Fisheries Science (M.F.Sc) and PhD programs in specialised branches of fisheries science, undertakes research, conducts capacity enhancement programs, and provides technical support and consultancy to development agencies, fishers, farmers and entrepreneurs. CIFE offers M.F.Sc and Ph.D programs under 11 various disciplines including: Aquaculture, Aquatic Environment Management, Aquatic Animal Health, Fisheries Resource Management, Fish Biochemistry & Physiology, Fish Nutrition & Feed Technology, Fish Genetics & Breeding, Fish Biotechnology, Fisheries Extension, Fisheries Economics and Post-Harvest Technology

  - Profile of ICAR CIFE (Indian Council of Agricultural Research - Central Institute of Fisheries Education):**

ICAR CIFE is an institution under the umbrella of the Indian Council of Agricultural Research (ICAR). The institute programs encompass postgraduate and doctoral studies in fisheries science.

  - Mandate:**

1. **Education and Training:** The institute offers postgraduate and doctoral programs in fisheries science.

2. **Research**

3. **Technology Transfer:** The institute engages in technology transfer and extension activities, disseminating research findings and best practices to stakeholders in the fisheries sector, including farmers, fishermen, and professionals.

4. **Capacity Building:** ICAR CIFE fosters capacity building through workshops, training programs, and skill development initiatives aimed at enhancing the capabilities of fisheries professionals, farmers, and fishermen.

  - Research Thrust Areas:**

ICAR CIFE's research endeavors encompass a wide spectrum of areas crucial to the fisheries sector:

1. **Aquaculture:** Enhancing the productivity, sustainability, and profitability of aquaculture practices through innovative techniques and technologies.

2. **Fisheries Resource Management:** Conservation and management of fisheries resources, both marine and inland, to ensure long-term sustainability.

3. **Aquatic Environment Management and Fish Health and Pathology:** Addressing issues related to aquatic environment management, fish health, disease diagnosis, and disease management strategies, including climate resilience.

4. **Post-Harvest Technology:** Developing efficient post-harvest practices, value addition, and processing technologies to reduce post-harvest losses and enhance the quality of fish products.

5. **Fish Nutrition & Feed Technology and Physiology Division:** Advancing the understanding of fish nutrition, feed technology, and physiology to optimize the health and growth of aquatic organisms.

6. **Fisheries Extension & Economics:** Integrating extension and economics to promote sustainable practices, enhance livelihoods, and ensure the socio-economic well-being of communities dependent on fisheries, including farmers and fishermen.

== See also ==
- College of Fisheries Science and Research Centre, Etawah
