= Sanskrit =

Ancient Indo-Aryan language of South Asia

- संस्कृत, संस्कृतम् Saṃskṛta-, Saṃskṛtam
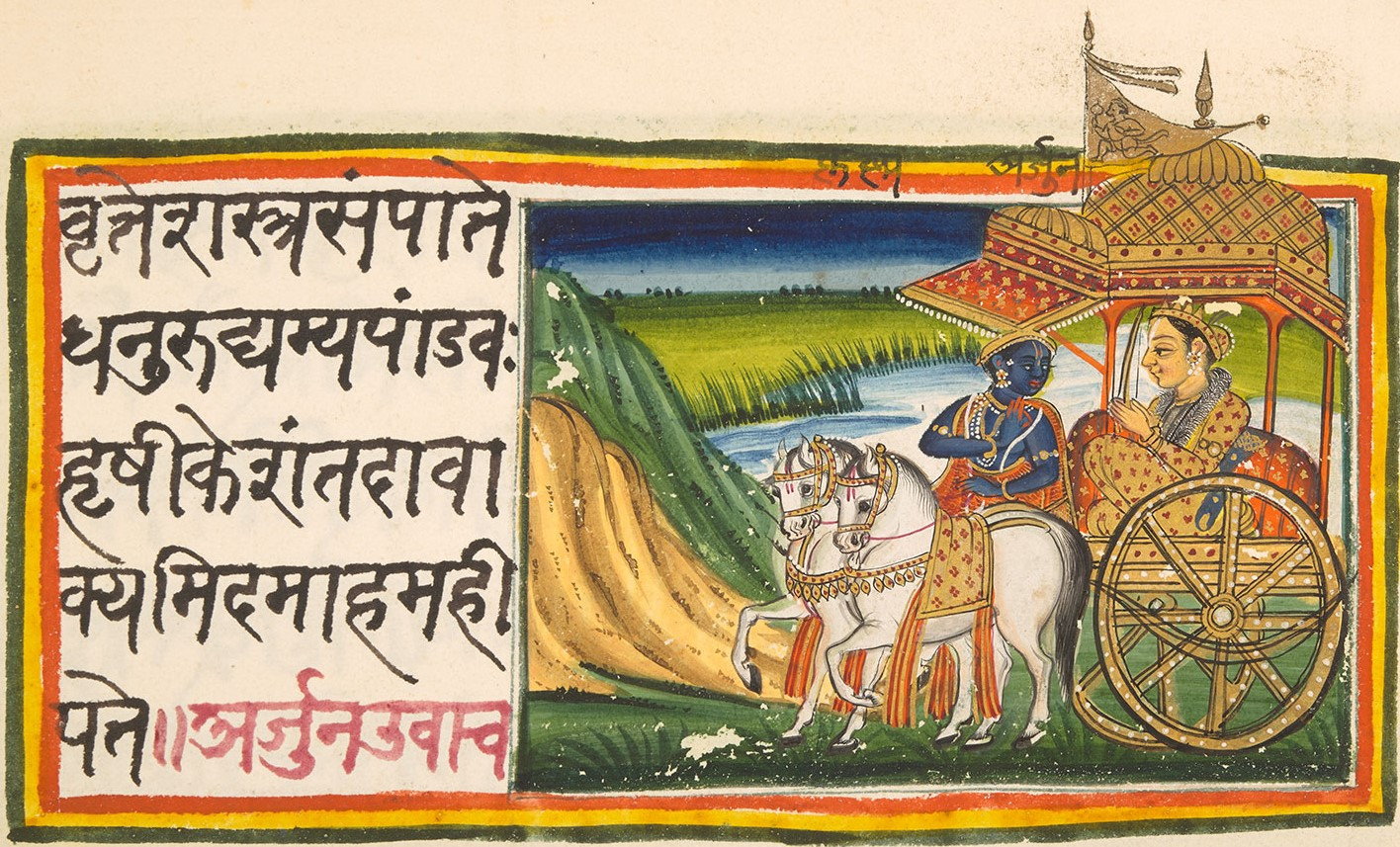
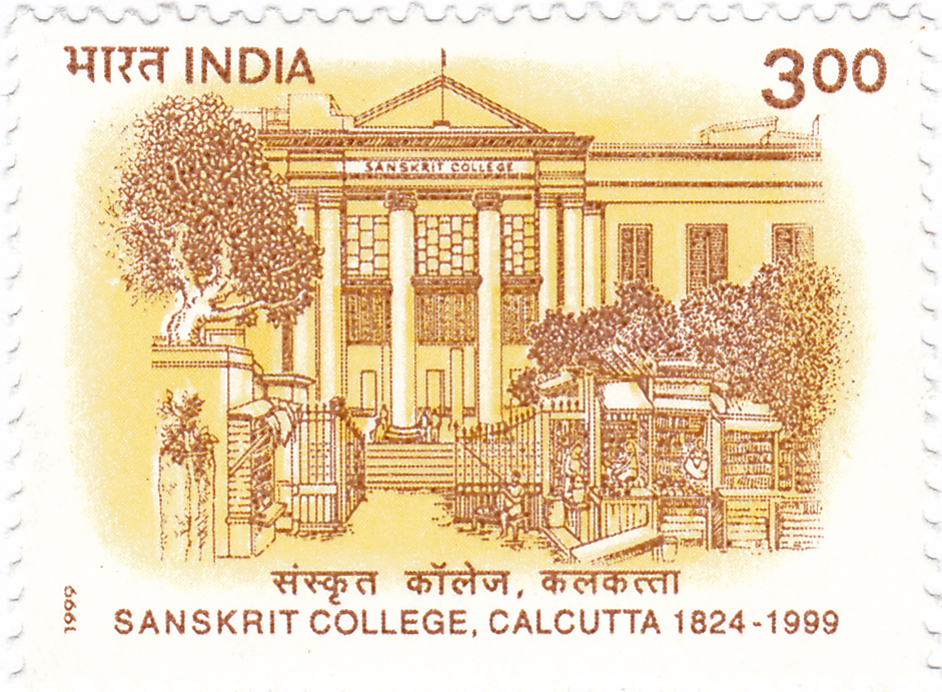
- (top) A 19th-century illustrated Sanskrit manuscript from the Bhagavad Gita, (bottom) The 175th-anniversary stamp of Sanskrit College, Calcutta, the third oldest. The oldest college was founded as Benares Sanskrit College in 1791.
- Region: South Asia (ancient and medieval), parts of Southeast Asia (medieval)
- Era: c. 1500–600 BCE (Vedic Sanskrit); 700 BCE – 1350 CE (Classical Sanskrit)
- Revival: There are no known native speakers of Sanskrit.
- Language family: Indo-European: Indo-Iranian; Indo-Aryan; Sanskrit
- Early form: Vedic Sanskrit
- Writing system: Devanagari script (present day). Originally orally transmitted. Not attested in writing until the 1st century BCE, when it was written in the Brahmi script, and later in various Brahmic scripts. (Note: "In conclusion, there are strong systemic and paleographic indications that the Brahmi script derived from a Semitic prototype, which, mainly on historical grounds, is most likely to have been Aramaic. However, the details of this problem remain to be worked out, and in any case, it is unlikely that a complete letter-by-letter derivation will ever be possible; for Brahmi may have been more of an adaptation and remodeling, rather than a direct derivation, of the presumptive Semitic prototype, perhaps under the influence of a preexisting Indian tradition of phonetic analysis. However, the Semitic hypothesis is not so strong as to rule out the remote possibility that further discoveries could drastically change the picture. In particular, a relationship of some kind, probably partial or indirect, with the protohistoric Indus Valley script should not be considered entirely out of the question." Salomon 1998, p. 30)

Official status
- Official language in: India (state-additional official) (Note: It is one of 22 Eighth Schedule languages for which the Constitution mandates development.): Himachal Pradesh; Uttarakhand
- Recognised minority language in: South Africa (Note: Sanskrit is a "Protected Language" as per the Constitution, Chapter 1(6)(5)(b)(¡¡))

Language codes
- ISO 639-1: sa
- ISO 639-2: san
- ISO 639-3: san – inclusive code Individual codes: cls – Classical Sanskrit vsn – Vedic Sanskrit
- Glottolog: sans1269

Sanskrit (/ˈsænskrɪt/; stem form संस्कृत; nominal singular संस्कृतम्, saṃskṛtam, (Note: "dhārayan·brāhmaṇam rupam·ilvalaḥ saṃskṛtam vadan..." – The Rāmāyaṇa 3.10.54 – said to be the first known use of saṃskṛta with reference to the language.)) is a classical language belonging to the Indo-Aryan branch of the Indo-European languages. It arose in South Asia after its predecessor languages had diffused there from the northwest in the late Bronze Age. Sanskrit is the sacred language of Hinduism, the language of classical Hindu philosophy, and of historical texts of Buddhism and Jainism. It was a link language in ancient and medieval South Asia, and upon transmission of Hindu and Buddhist culture to Southeast Asia, East Asia and Central Asia in the early medieval era, it became a language of religion and high culture, and of the political elites in some of these regions. As a result, Sanskrit had a lasting effect on the languages of South Asia, Southeast Asia and East Asia, especially in their formal and learned vocabularies.

Sanskrit generally connotes several Old Indo-Aryan language varieties. The most archaic of these is the Vedic Sanskrit found in the Rigveda, a collection of 1,028 hymns composed between 1500 and 1200 BCE by Indo-Aryan tribes migrating east from the mountains of what is today northern Afghanistan across northern Pakistan and into northwestern India. Vedic Sanskrit interacted with the preexisting ancient languages of the subcontinent, absorbing names of newly encountered plants and animals; in addition, the ancient Dravidian languages influenced Sanskrit's phonology and syntax. Sanskrit can also more narrowly refer to Classical Sanskrit, a refined and standardised grammatical form that emerged in the mid-1st millennium BCE and was codified in the most comprehensive of ancient grammars, (Note: "All these achievements are dwarfed, though, by the Sanskrit linguistic tradition culminating in the famous grammar by Pāṇini, known as the Aṣṭhādhyāyī. The elegance and comprehensiveness of its architecture have yet to be surpassed by any grammar of any language, and its ingenious methods of stratifying out use and mention, language and metalanguage, and theorem and metatheorem predate key discoveries in western philosophy by millennia.") the Aṣṭādhyāyī ('Eight chapters') of Pāṇini. The greatest dramatist in Sanskrit, Kālidāsa, wrote in classical Sanskrit, and the foundations of modern arithmetic were first described in classical Sanskrit. (Note: "The Sanskrit grammatical tradition is also the ultimate source of the notion of zero, which, once adopted in the Arabic system of numerals, allowed us to transcend the cumbersome notations of Roman arithmetic.") The two major Sanskrit epics, the Mahābhārata and the Rāmāyaṇa, however, were composed in a range of oral storytelling registers called Epic Sanskrit which was used in northern India between 400 BCE and 300 CE, and roughly contemporary with classical Sanskrit. In the following centuries, Sanskrit became tradition-bound, stopped being learned as a first language, and ultimately stopped developing as a living language.

The hymns of the Rigveda are notably similar to the most archaic poems of the Iranian and Greek language families, the Gathas of old Avestan and Iliad of Homer. As the Rigveda was orally transmitted by methods of memorisation of exceptional complexity, rigour and fidelity, as a single text without variant readings, its preserved archaic syntax and morphology are of vital importance in the reconstruction of the common ancestor language Proto-Indo-European. Sanskrit does not have an attested native script: from around the turn of the 1st-millennium CE, it has been written in various Brahmic scripts, and in the modern era most commonly in Devanagari.

Sanskrit's status, function, and place in India's cultural heritage are recognised by its inclusion in the Constitution of India's Eighth Schedule languages. However, despite attempts at revival, there are no first-language speakers of Sanskrit in India. In each of India's recent decennial censuses, several thousand citizens have reported Sanskrit to be their mother tongue, (Note: 6,106 Indians in 1981, 49,736 in 1991, 14,135 in 2001, and 24,821 in 2011, have reported Sanskrit to be their mother tongue.) but the numbers are thought to signify a wish to be aligned with the prestige of the language. Sanskrit has been taught in traditional gurukulas since ancient times; it is widely taught today at the secondary school level. The oldest Sanskrit college is the Benares Sanskrit College founded in 1791 during East India Company rule. Sanskrit continues to be widely used as a ceremonial and ritual language in Hindu and Buddhist hymns and chants.

== Etymology and nomenclature ==
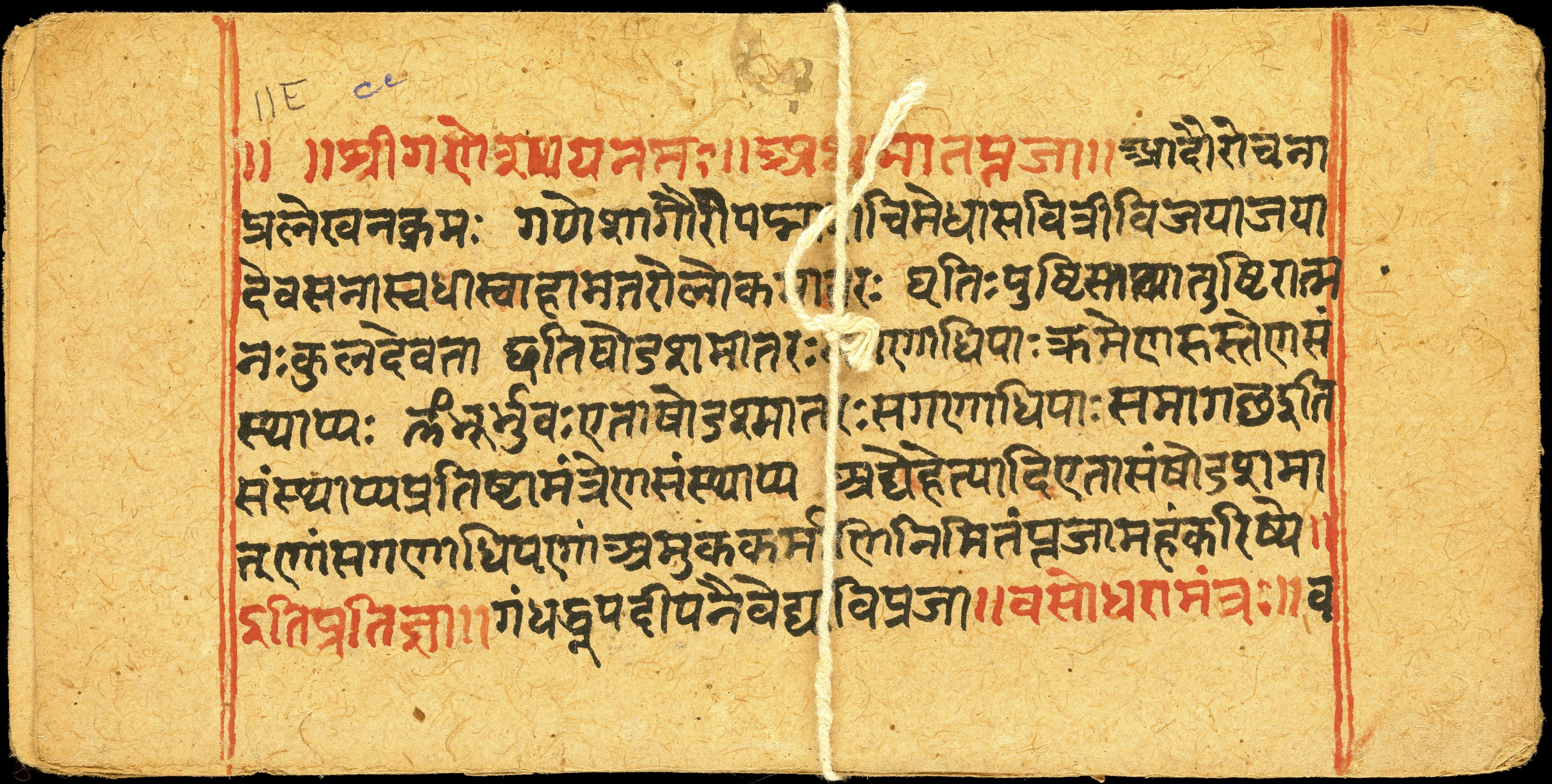
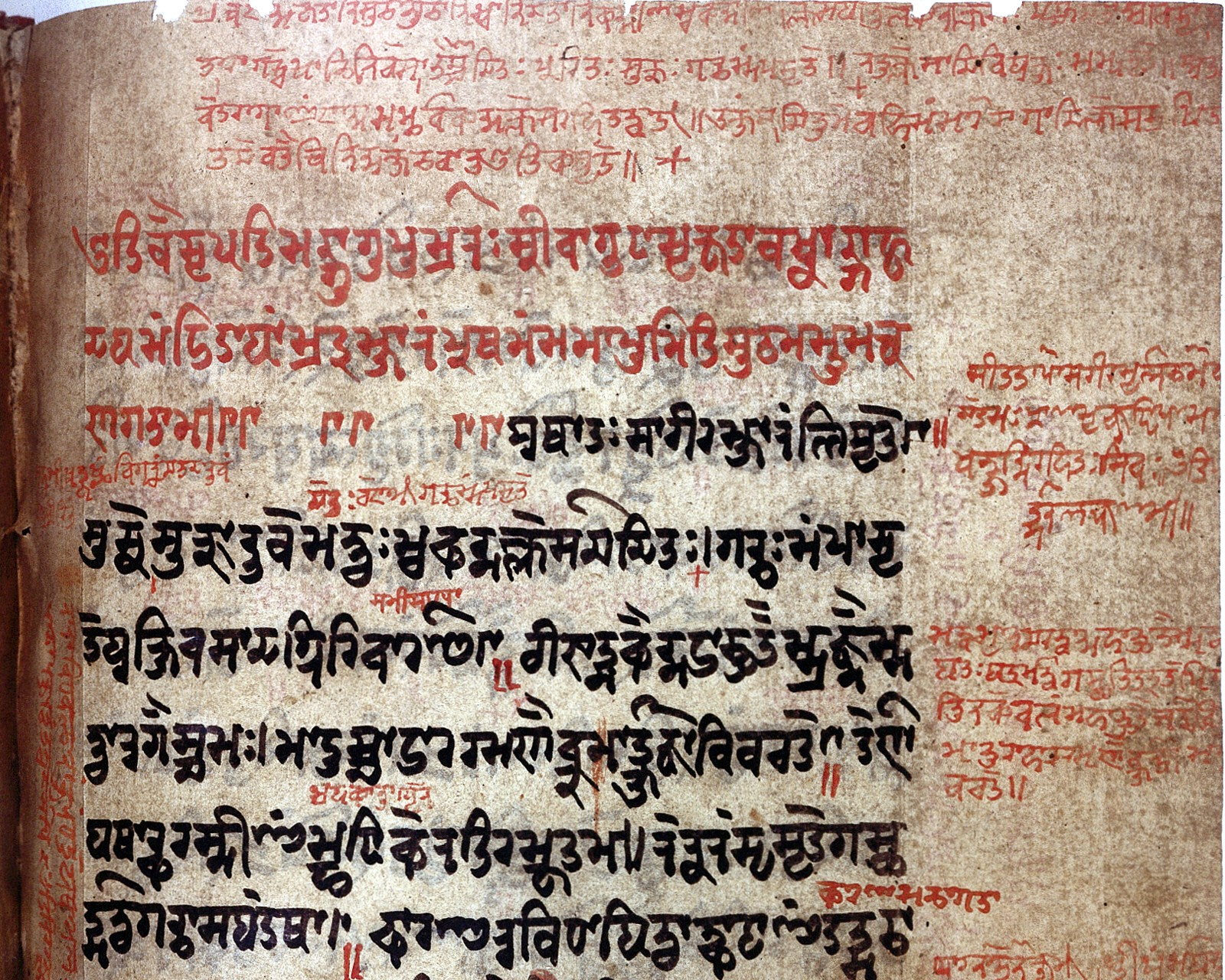
Historic Sanskrit manuscripts: a religious text (top), and a medical text

In Sanskrit, the verbal adjective sáṃskṛta- is a compound word consisting of sáṃ ('together, good, well, perfected') and kṛta- ('made, formed, work'). It connotes a work that has been "well prepared, pure and perfect, polished, sacred". According to Biderman, the perfection contextually being referred to in the etymological origins of the word is its tonal—rather than semantic—qualities. Sound and oral transmission were highly valued qualities in ancient India, and its sages refined the alphabet, the structure of words, and its exacting grammar into a "collection of sounds, a kind of sublime musical mold" as an integral language they called Saṃskṛta. From the late Vedic period onwards, state Annette Wilke and Oliver Moebus, resonating sound and its musical foundations attracted an "exceptionally large amount of linguistic, philosophical and religious literature" in India. Sound was visualised as "pervading all creation", another representation of the world itself. The search for perfection in thought and the goal of liberation were among the dimensions of sacred sound, and the common thread that wove all ideas and inspirations together became the quest for what the ancient Indians believed to be a perfect language, the "phonocentric episteme" of Sanskrit.

== History ==
=== Origin and development ===
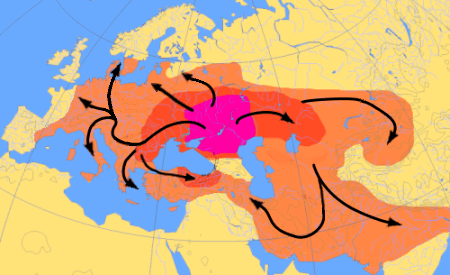
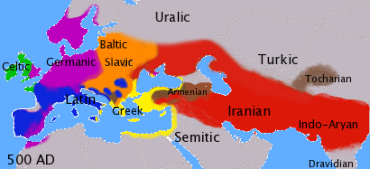
First map: The Kurgan hypothesis on Indo-European migrations between 4000 and 1000 BCE. Second map: The geographical spread of the Indo-European languages at 500 CE, with Sanskrit in South Asia

Sanskrit belongs to the Indo-European family of languages. It is one of the three earliest ancient documented languages that arose from a common root language now referred to as Proto-Indo-European.

Other Indo-European languages distantly related to Sanskrit include archaic and Classical Latin (c. 600 BCE–100 CE, Italic languages), Gothic (archaic Germanic language, c. 350 CE), Old Norse (c. 200 CE and after), Old Avestan (c. late 2nd millennium BCE) and Younger Avestan (c. 900 BCE). The closest ancient relatives of Vedic Sanskrit in the Indo-European languages are the Nuristani languages found in the remote Hindu Kush region of northeastern Afghanistan and northwestern Himalayas, as well as the extinct Avestan and Old Persian – both Iranian languages. Sanskrit belongs to the satem group of the Indo-European languages.

Colonial era scholars familiar with Latin and Greek were struck by the resemblance of the Sanskrit language, both in its vocabulary and grammar, to the classical languages of Europe. In The Oxford Introduction to Proto-Indo-European and the Proto-Indo-European World, Mallory and Adams illustrate the resemblance with the following examples of cognate forms (with the addition of Old English for further comparison):

PIE	English	Old English	Latin	Ancient Greek	Sanskrit	Glossary
*méh₂tēr	mother	mōdor	māter	mētēr	mātṛ́-	mother
*ph₂tḗr	father	fæder	pater	patēr	pitṛ́-	father
*bʰréh₂tēr	brother	brōþor	frāter	phreter	bhrā́tṛ-	brother
*swésōr	sister	sweoster	soror	eor	svásṛ-	sister
*suHnús	son	sunu	-	hyiós	sūnú-	son
*dʰugh₂tḗr	daughter	dohtor	-	thugátēr	duhitṛ́-	daughter
*gʷṓws	cow	cū	bōs	bous	gaú-	cow
*demh₂-	tame, timber	tam, timber	domus	dom-	dām-	house, tame, build

The correspondences suggest some common root, and historical links between some of the distant major ancient languages of the world. (Note: William Jones (1786), quoted by Thomas Burrow in The Sanskrit Language: "The Sanscrit language, whatever be its antiquity, is of a wonderful structure; more perfect than the Greek, more copious than the Latin, and more exquisitely refined than either, yet bearing to both of them a stronger affinity, both in the roots of verbs and the forms of grammar, than could possibly have been produced by accident; so strong indeed, that no philologer could examine them all three, without believing them to have sprung from some common source, which perhaps no longer exists. There is a similar reason, though not quite so forcible, for supposing that both the Gothick and the Celtick [sic], though blended with a very different idiom, had the same origin with the Sanscrit; and the Old Persian might be added to the same family.")

The Indo-Aryan migrations theory explains the common features shared by Sanskrit and other Indo-European languages by proposing that the original speakers of what became Sanskrit arrived in South Asia from a region of common origin, somewhere north-west of the Indus region, during the early 2nd millennium BCE. Evidence for such a theory includes the close relationship between the Indo-Iranian tongues and the Baltic and Slavic languages, vocabulary exchange with the non-Indo-European Uralic languages, and the nature of the attested Indo-European words for flora and fauna.

The pre-history of Indo-Aryan languages which preceded Vedic Sanskrit is unclear and various hypotheses place it over a fairly wide limit. According to Thomas Burrow, based on the relationship between various Indo-European languages, the origin of all these languages may possibly be in what is now Central or Eastern Europe, while the Indo-Iranian group possibly arose in Central Russia. The Iranian and Indo-Aryan branches separated quite early. It is the Indo-Aryan branch that moved into eastern Iran and then south into South Asia in the first half of the 2nd millennium BCE. Once in ancient India, the Indo-Aryan language underwent rapid linguistic change and morphed into the Vedic Sanskrit language.

=== Vedic Sanskrit ===
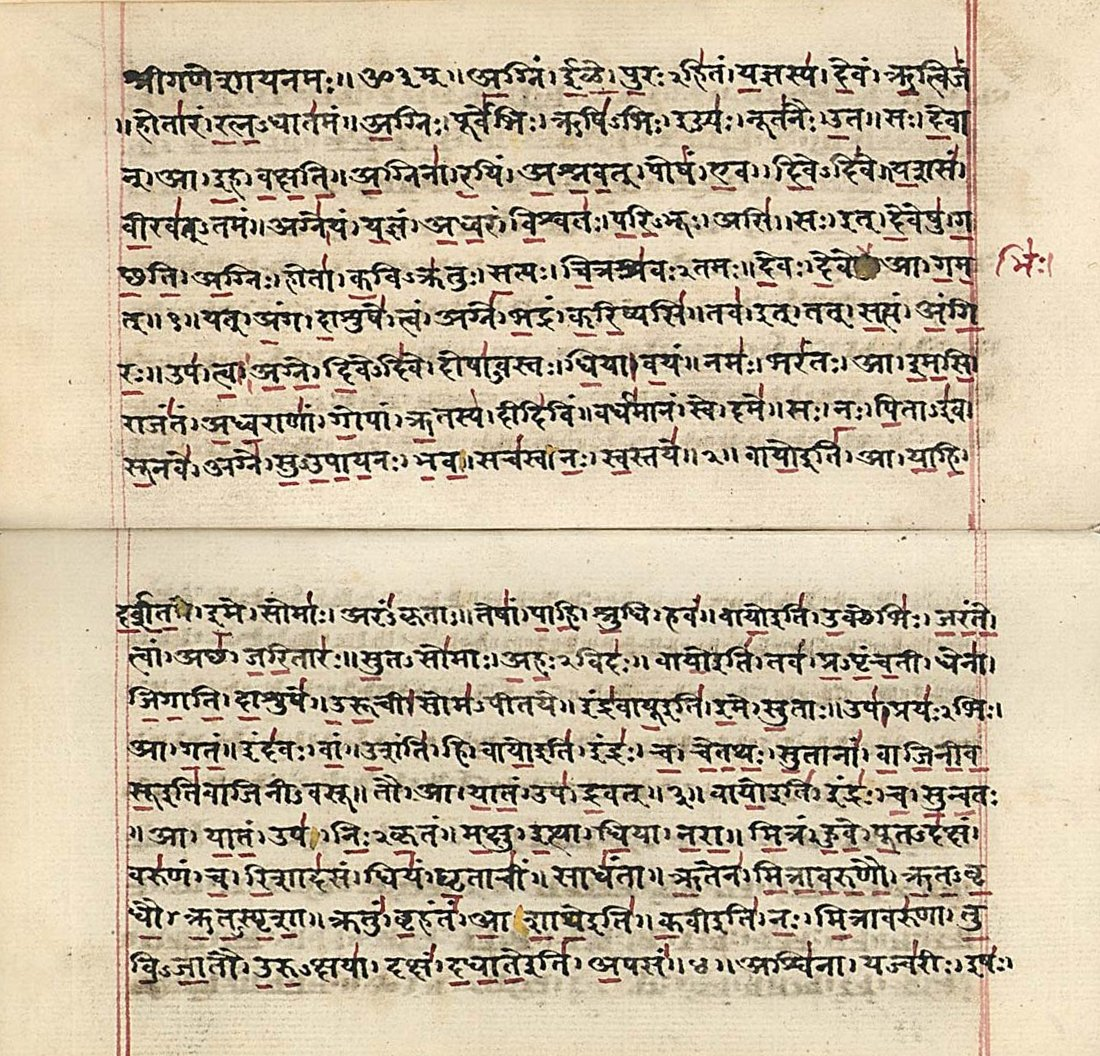
Rigveda (padapatha) manuscript in Devanagari, early 19th century. The red horizontal and vertical lines mark low and high pitch changes for chanting.

The pre-Classical form of Sanskrit is known as Vedic Sanskrit. The earliest attested Sanskrit text is the Rigveda (Ṛg-veda), a Hindu scripture from the mid- to late-second millennium BCE. No written records from such an early period survive, if any ever existed, but scholars are generally confident that the oral transmission of the texts is reliable: they are ceremonial literature, where the exact phonetic expression and its preservation were a part of the historic tradition.

However some scholars have suggested that the original Ṛg-veda differed in some fundamental ways in phonology compared to the sole surviving version available to us. In particular that retroflex consonants did not exist as a natural part of the earliest Vedic language, and that these developed in the centuries after the composition had been completed, and as a gradual unconscious process during the oral transmission by generations of reciters.

The primary source for this argument is internal evidence of the text which betrays an instability of the phenomenon of retroflexion, with the same phrases having sandhi-induced retroflexion in some parts but not other. This is taken along with evidence of controversy, for example, in passages of the Aitareya-Āraṇyaka (700 BCE), which features a discussion on whether retroflexion is valid in particular cases.

The Ṛg-veda is a collection of books, created by multiple authors. These authors represented different generations, and the mandalas 2 to 7 are the oldest while the mandalas 1 and 10 are relatively the youngest. Yet, the Vedic Sanskrit in these books of the Ṛg-veda "hardly presents any dialectical diversity", according Louis Renou. This implies Vedic Sanskrit had a "set linguistic pattern" by the second half of the 2nd millennium BCE. Beyond the Ṛg-veda, the ancient literature in Vedic Sanskrit that has survived into the modern age include the Samaveda, Yajurveda, Atharvaveda, along with the embedded and layered Vedic texts such as the Brahmanas, Aranyakas, and the early Upanishads. These Vedic documents reflect the dialects of Sanskrit found in the various parts of the northwestern, northern, and eastern Indian subcontinent.

According to Michael Witzel, Vedic Sanskrit was a spoken language of the semi-nomadic Aryans. The Vedic Sanskrit language or a closely related Indo-European variant was recognised beyond ancient India as evidenced by the "Mitanni Treaty" between the ancient Hittite and Mitanni people, carved into a rock, in a region that now includes parts of Syria and Turkey. (Note: The Mitanni treaty is generally dated to the 16th century BCE, but this date and its significance remains much debated.) Parts of this treaty, such as the names of the Mitanni princes and technical terms related to horse training, for reasons not understood, are in early forms of Vedic Sanskrit. The treaty also invokes the gods Varuna, Mitra, Indra, and Nasatya found in the earliest layers of the Vedic literature.

O Bṛhaspati, when in giving names
they first set forth the beginning of Language,
Their most excellent and spotless secret
was laid bare through love,
When the wise ones formed Language with their mind,
purifying it like grain with a winnowing fan,
Then friends knew friendships –
an auspicious mark placed on their language.

— Rigveda 10.71.1–4
Translated by Roger Woodard

The Vedic Sanskrit found in the Ṛg-veda is distinctly more archaic than other Vedic texts, and in many respects, the Rigvedic language is notably more similar to those found in the archaic texts of Old Avestan Zoroastrian Gathas and Homer's Iliad and Odyssey. According to Stephanie W. Jamison and Joel P. Brereton the Vedic Sanskrit literature "clearly inherited" from Indo-Iranian and Indo-European times the social structures such as the role of the poet and the priests, the patronage economy, the phrasal equations, and some of the poetic metres. (Note: An example of the shared phrasal equations is the dyáuṣ pitṛ́ in Vedic Sanskrit, from Proto-Indo-European *dyḗws ph₂tḗr, meaning "sky father". The Mycenaean Greek equivalent is Zeus Pater, which evolved to Jupiter in Latin. Equivalent "paternal Heaven" phrasal equation is found in many Indo-European languages.) While there are similarities, state Jamison and Brereton, there are also differences between Vedic Sanskrit, the Old Avestan, and the Mycenaean Greek literature. For example, simile is deployed extensively in the Sanskrit Ṛg-veda, whereas the Old Avestan Gathas lack simile entirely (and it is rare in later forms of the language); conversely, simile is common in Homeric Greek, but they are structurally very different to those in Ṛg-vedic Sanskrit.

=== Classical Sanskrit ===
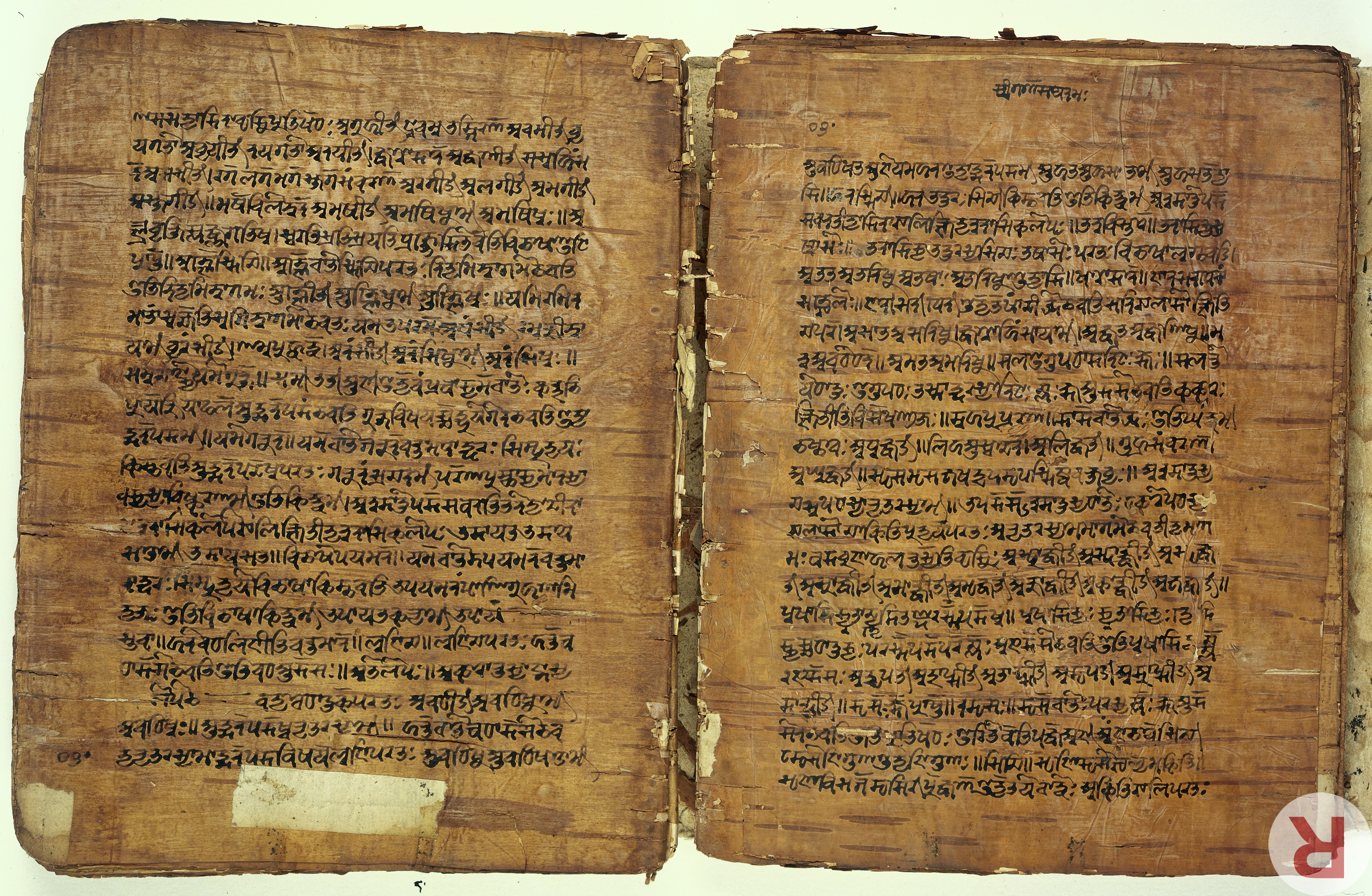
A 17th-century birch bark manuscript of Pāṇini's grammar treatise from Kashmir

The early Vedic form of the Sanskrit language was far less homogenous compared to the Classical Sanskrit as defined by grammarians by about the mid-1st millennium BCE. According to Richard Gombrich—an Indologist and a scholar of Sanskrit, Pāli and Buddhist Studies—the archaic Vedic Sanskrit found in the Rigveda had already evolved in the Vedic period, as evidenced in the later Vedic literature. Gombrich posits that the language in the early Upanishads of Hinduism and the late Vedic literature approaches Classical Sanskrit, while the archaic Vedic Sanskrit had by the Buddha's time become unintelligible to all except ancient Indian sages.

The formalisation of the Sanskṛit language is credited to Pāṇini, along with Patañjali's Mahābhāṣya and Kātyayana's commentary that preceded Patāñjali's work. Panini composed the Aṣṭādhyāyī ('Eight-Chapter Grammar'), which became the foundation of Vyākaraṇa, a Vedānga. The Aṣṭādhyāyī was not the first description of Sanskrit grammar, but it is the earliest that has survived in full, and the culmination of a long grammatical tradition that Fortson says, is "one of the intellectual wonders of the ancient world". Pāṇini cites ten scholars on the phonological and grammatical aspects of the Sanskrit language before him, as well as the variants in the usage of Sanskrit in different regions of India. The ten Vedic scholars he quotes are Āpiśali, Kaśyapa, Gārgya, Gālava, Cakravarmaṇa, Bhāradvāja, Śākaṭāyana, Śākalya, Senaka and Sphoṭāyana.

In the Aṣṭādhyāyī, language is observed in a manner that has no parallel among Greek or Latin grammarians. Pāṇini's grammar, according to Renou and Filliozat, is a classic that defines the linguistic expression and sets the standard for the Sanskrit language. Pāṇini made use of a technical metalanguage consisting of a syntax, morphology and lexicon. This metalanguage is organised according to a series of meta-rules, some of which are explicitly stated while others can be deduced. Despite differences in the analysis from that of modern linguistics, Pāṇini's work has been found valuable and the most advanced analysis of linguistics until the twentieth century.

Pāṇini's comprehensive and scientific theory of grammar is conventionally taken to mark the start of Classical Sanskrit. His systematic treatise inspired and made Sanskrit the preeminent Indian language of learning and literature for two millennia. It is unclear whether Pāṇini himself wrote his treatise or he orally created the detailed and sophisticated treatise then transmitted it through his students. Modern scholarship generally accepts that he knew of a form of writing, based on references to words such as lipi ('script') and lipikara ('scribe') in section 3.2 of the Aṣṭādhyāyī. (Note: Pāṇini's use of the term lipi has been a source of scholarly disagreements. Harry Falk in his 1993 overview states that ancient Indians neither knew nor used writing script, and Pāṇini's mention is likely a reference to Semitic and Greek scripts. In his 1995 review, Salomon questions Falk's arguments and writes it is "speculative at best and hardly constitutes firm grounds for a late date for Kharoṣṭhī. The stronger argument for this position is that we have no specimen of the script before the time of Ashoka, nor any direct evidence of intermediate stages in its development; but of course this does not mean that such earlier forms did not exist, only that, if they did exist, they have not survived, presumably because they were not employed for monumental purposes before Ashoka". According to Hartmut Scharfe, lipi of Pāṇini may be borrowed from the Old Persian dipi, in turn derived from Sumerian dup. Scharfe adds that the best evidence, at the time of his review, is that no script was used in India, aside from the Northwest Indian subcontinent, before c. 300 BCE because Indian tradition "at every occasion stresses the orality of the cultural and literary heritage". Kenneth Norman states writing scripts in ancient India evolved over the long period of time like other cultures, that it is unlikely that ancient Indians developed a single complete writing system at one and the same time in the Maurya era. It is even less likely, states Norman, that a writing script was invented during Ashoka's rule, starting from nothing, for the specific purpose of writing his inscriptions and then it was understood all over South Asia where the Ashoka pillars are found. Goody (1987) states that ancient India likely had a "very old culture of writing" along with its oral tradition of composing and transmitting knowledge, because the Vedic literature is too vast, consistent and complex to have been entirely created, memorised, accurately preserved and spread without a written system. Falk disagrees with Goody, and suggests that it is a Western presumption and inability to imagine that remarkably early scientific achievements such as Pāṇini's grammar (5th to 4th century BCE), and the creation, preservation and wide distribution of the large corpus of the Brahmanic Vedic literature and the Buddhist canonical literature, without any writing scripts. Bronkhorst (2002) disagrees with Falk, and states, "Falk goes too far. It is fair to expect that we believe that Vedic memorisation—though without parallel in any other human society—has been able to preserve very long texts for many centuries without losing a syllable. ... However, the oral composition of a work as complex as Pāṇini's grammar is not only without parallel in other human cultures, it is without parallel in India itself. ... It just will not do to state that our difficulty in conceiving any such thing is our problem".)

The Classical Sanskrit language formalised by Pāṇini, states Renou, is "not an impoverished language", rather it is "a controlled and a restrained language from which archaisms and unnecessary formal alternatives were excluded". The Classical form of the language simplified the sandhi rules but retained various aspects of the Vedic language, while adding rigor and flexibilities, so that it had sufficient means to express thoughts as well as being "capable of responding to the future increasing demands of an infinitely diversified literature", according to Renou. Pāṇini included numerous "optional rules" beyond the Vedic Sanskrit's bahulam framework, to respect liberty and creativity so that individual writers separated by geography or time would have the choice to express facts and their views in their own way, where tradition followed competitive forms of the Sanskrit language.

The phonetic differences between Vedic Sanskrit and Classical Sanskrit, as discerned from the current state of the surviving literature, are negligible when compared to the intense change that must have occurred in the pre-Vedic period between the Proto-Indo-Aryan language and Vedic Sanskrit. The noticeable differences in Vedic include more grammatical categories as well as the differences in accent, semantics, syntax, declension, and internal and external sandhi rules. Quite a few words found in the early Vedic Sanskrit language are never found in late Vedic Sanskrit or Classical Sanskrit literature, while some words have different and new meanings in Classical Sanskrit when contextually compared to the early Vedic Sanskrit literature.

=== Sanskrit and Prakrit languages ===
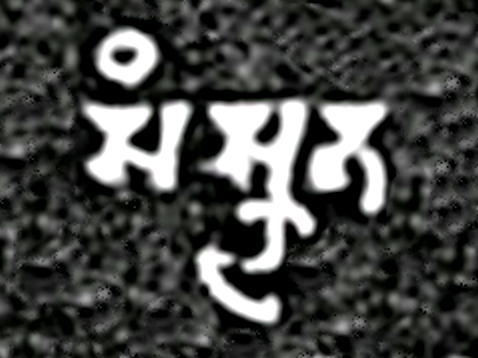
An early use of the word for "Sanskrit" in Late Brahmi script (also called Gupta script): Saṃ-skṛ-ta Mandsaur stone inscription of Yashodharman-Vishnuvardhana, 532 CE.

The earliest known use of the word Saṃskṛta (Sanskrit), in the context of a speech or language, is found in verses 5.28.17–19 of the Ramayana. Outside the learned sphere of written Classical Sanskrit, vernacular colloquial dialects (Prakrits) continued to evolve, meaning the language co-existed with the numerous Prakrits of ancient India. As the Indian thought diversified and challenged earlier beliefs of Hinduism, particularly in the form of Buddhism and Jainism, the Prakrit languages such as Pali in Theravada Buddhism and Ardhamagadhi in Jainism competed with Sanskrit. According to Paul Dundas, however, these ancient Prakrit languages had "roughly the same relationship to Sanskrit as medieval Italian does to Latin".

A section of European scholars state that Sanskrit was never a spoken language. However, evidences shows that Sanskrit was a spoken language, essential for oral tradition that preserved the vast number of Sanskrit manuscripts from ancient India. The textual evidence in the works of Yaksa, Panini, and Patanajali affirms that Classical Sanskrit in their era was a spoken language (bhasha) used by the cultured and educated with some sutras expounding upon the variant forms of spoken Sanskrit versus written Sanskrit. Chinese Buddhist pilgrim Xuanzang mentioned in his memoir that official philosophical debates in India were held in Sanskrit, not in the vernacular language of that region.

Sanskrit's link to the Prakrit languages and other Indo-European languages

According to Sanskrit linguist professor Madhav Deshpande, Sanskrit was a spoken language in a colloquial form by the mid-1st millennium BCE which coexisted with a more formal, grammatically correct form of literary Sanskrit. This, states Deshpande, is true for modern languages where colloquial incorrect approximations and dialects of a language are spoken and understood, along with more "refined, sophisticated and grammatically accurate" forms of the same language being found in the literary works. Sanskrit was a spoken language in the educated and the elite classes, but it was also a language that must have been understood in a wider circle of society because the widely popular folk epics and stories such as the Ramayana, the Mahabharata, the Bhagavata Purana, the Panchatantra and many other texts are all in the Sanskrit language, while many Sanskrit dramas indicate that the language coexisted with the vernacular Prakrits. Thus, Classical Sanskrit with its exacting grammar was the language of the Indian scholars and the educated classes, while others communicated with approximate or ungrammatical variants along with other natural Indian languages, with the cities of Varanasi, Paithan, Pune and Kanchipuram being centres of Sanskrit learning and debate until the arrival of the colonial era.

According to Lamotte, Sanskrit became the dominant literary and inscriptional language because of its precision in communication. It was, states Lamotte, an ideal instrument for presenting ideas, and as knowledge in Sanskrit multiplied, so did its spread and influence. Sanskrit was adopted voluntarily as a vehicle of high culture, arts, and profound ideas. Pollock disagrees with Lamotte, but concurs that Sanskrit's influence grew into what he terms a "Sanskrit Cosmopolis" over a region that included all of South Asia and much of southeast Asia. The Sanskrit language cosmopolis thrived beyond India between 300 and 1300 CE.

=== Dravidian influence on Sanskrit ===
Reinöhl mentions that not only have the Dravidian languages borrowed from Sanskrit vocabulary, but they have also affected Sanskrit on deeper levels of structure, "for instance in the domain of phonology where Indo-Aryan retroflexes have been attributed to Dravidian influence". Similarly, Ferenc Ruzca states that all the major shifts in Indo-Aryan phonetics over two millennia can be attributed to the constant influence of a Dravidian language with a similar phonetic structure to Tamil. Hock et al. quoting George Hart state that there was influence of Old Tamil on Sanskrit. Hart compared Old Tamil and Classical Sanskrit to arrive at a conclusion that there was a common language from which these features both derived – "that both Tamil and Sanskrit derived their shared conventions, metres, and techniques from a common source, for it is clear that neither borrowed directly from the other."

Reinöhl further states that there is a symmetric relationship between Dravidian languages like Kannada or Tamil, with Indo-Aryan languages like Bengali or Hindi, whereas the same relationship is not found for non-Indo-Aryan languages, for example, Persian or English:

A sentence in a Dravidian language like Tamil or Kannada becomes ordinarily good Bengali or Hindi by substituting Bengali or Hindi equivalents for the Dravidian words and forms, without modifying the word order; but the same thing is not possible in rendering a Persian or English sentence into a non-Indo-Aryan language.

— Reinöhl

Shulman mentions that "Dravidian nonfinite verbal forms (called vinaiyeccam in Tamil) shaped the usage of the Sanskrit nonfinite verbs (originally derived from inflected forms of action nouns in Vedic). This particularly salient case of the possible influence of Dravidian on Sanskrit is only one of many items of syntactic assimilation, not least among them the large repertoire of morphological modality and aspect that, once one knows to look for it, can be found everywhere in classical and postclassical Sanskrit".

The main influence of Dravidian on Sanskrit is found to have been concentrated in the timespan between the late Vedic period and the crystallisation of Classical Sanskrit. As in this period the Indo-Aryan tribes had not yet made contact with the inhabitants of the South of the subcontinent, this suggests a significant presence of Dravidian speakers in North India (the central Gangetic plain and the classical Madhyadeśa) who were instrumental in this substratal influence on Sanskrit.

== Influence ==
Extant manuscripts in Sanskrit number over 30 million, one hundred times those in Greek and Latin combined, constituting the largest cultural heritage that any civilization has produced before the invention of the printing press.

— Foreword of Sanskrit Computational Linguistics (2009), Gérard Huet, Amba Kulkarni and Peter Scharf (Note: The Indian Mission for Manuscripts initiative has already counted over 5 million manuscripts. The thirty million estimate is of David Pingree, a manuscriptologist and historian. – Peter M. Scharf)

Sanskrit has been the predominant language of Hindu texts encompassing a rich tradition of philosophical and religious texts, as well as poetry, music, drama, scientific, technical and others. It is the predominant language of one of the largest collection of historic manuscripts. The earliest known inscriptions in Sanskrit are from the 1st century BCE, such as the Ayodhya Inscription of Dhana and Ghosundi-Hathibada (Chittorgarh).

Though developed and nurtured by scholars of orthodox schools of Hinduism, Sanskrit has been the language for some of the key literary works and theology of heterodox schools of Indian philosophies such as Buddhism and Jainism. The structure and capabilities of the Classical Sanskrit language launched ancient Indian speculations about "the nature and function of language", what is the relationship between words and their meanings in the context of a community of speakers, whether this relationship is objective or subjective, discovered or is created, how individuals learn and relate to the world around them through language, and about the limits of language. They speculated on the role of language, the ontological status of painting word-images through sound, and the need for rules so that it can serve as a means for a community of speakers, separated by geography or time, to share and understand profound ideas from each other. (Note: A celebrated work on the philosophy of language is the Vakyapadiya by the 5th-century Hindu scholar Bhartrhari.) These speculations became particularly important to the Mīmāṃsā and the Nyaya schools of Hindu philosophy, and later to Vedanta and Mahayana Buddhism, states Frits Staal—a scholar of Linguistics with a focus on Indian philosophies and Sanskrit. Though written in a number of different scripts, the dominant language of Hindu texts has been Sanskrit. It or a hybrid form of Sanskrit became the preferred language of Mahayana Buddhism scholarship; for example, one of the early and influential Buddhist philosophers, Nagarjuna (c.200 CE), used Classical Sanskrit as the language for his texts. According to Renou, Sanskrit had a limited role in the Theravada tradition (formerly known as the Hinayana) but the Prakrit works that have survived are of doubtful authenticity. Some of the canonical fragments of the early Buddhist traditions, discovered in the 20th century, suggest the early Buddhist traditions used an imperfect and reasonably good Sanskrit, sometimes with a Pali syntax, states Renou. The Mahāsāṃghika and Mahavastu, in their late Hinayana forms, used hybrid Sanskrit for their literature. Sanskrit was also the language of some of the oldest surviving, authoritative and much followed philosophical works of Jainism such as the Tattvartha Sutra by Umaswati. (Note: 'That Which Is', known as the Tattvartha Sutra to Jains, is recognised by all four Jain traditions as the earliest, most authoritative, and comprehensive summary of their religion. —)

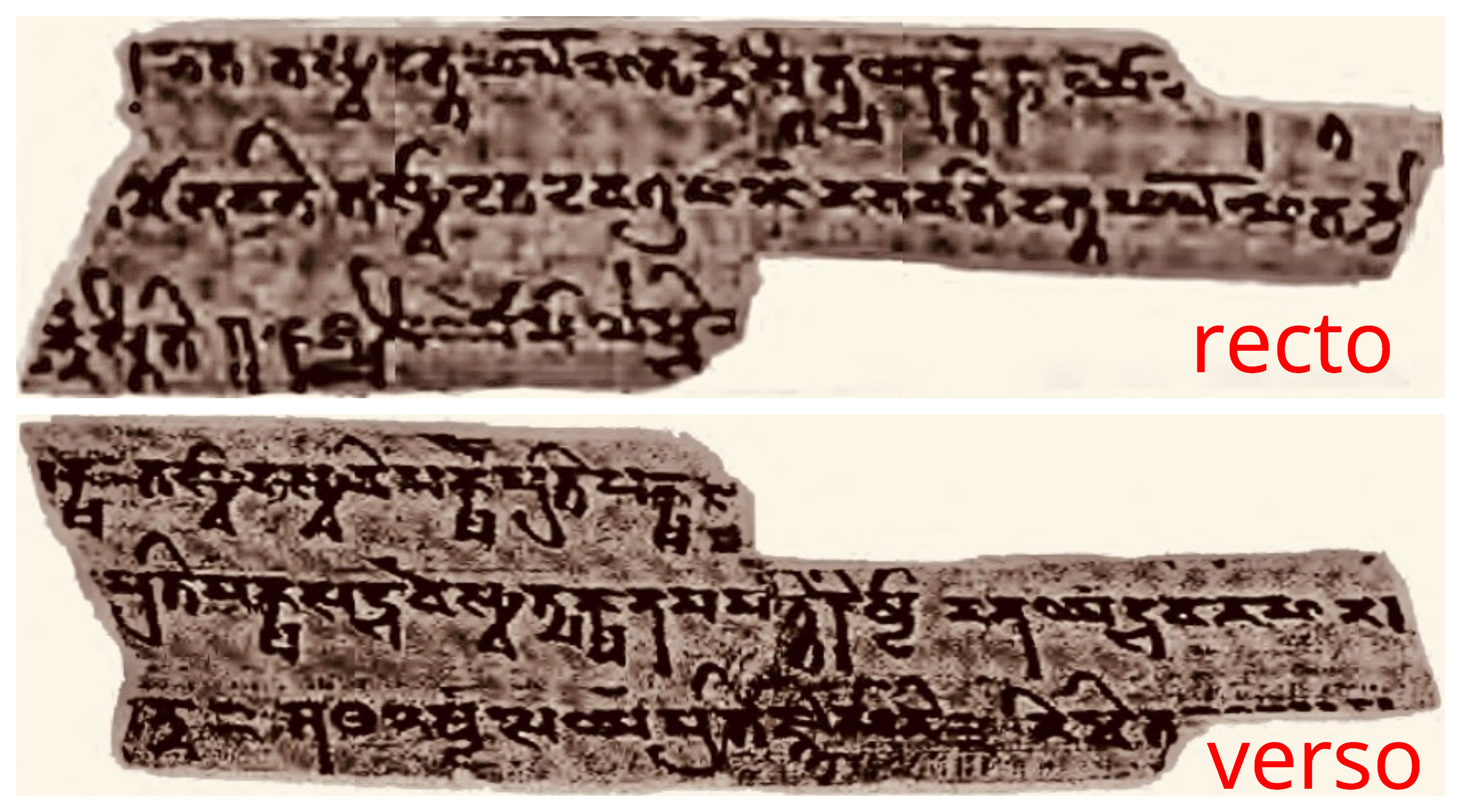
The Spitzer Manuscript is dated to about the 2nd century CE (above: folio 383 fragment). Discovered in the Kizil Caves, near the northern branch of the Central Asian Silk Route in northwest China, it is the oldest Sanskrit philosophical manuscript known so far.

The Sanskrit language has been one of the major means for the transmission of knowledge and ideas in Asian history. Indian texts in Sanskrit were already in China by 402 CE, carried by the influential Buddhist pilgrim Faxian who translated them into Chinese by 418 CE. Xuanzang, another Chinese Buddhist pilgrim, learnt Sanskrit in India and carried 657 Sanskrit texts to China in the 7th century where he established a major centre of learning and language translation under the patronage of Emperor Taizong. By the early 1st millennium CE, Sanskrit had spread Buddhist and Hindu ideas to Southeast Asia, parts of the East Asia and the Central Asia. It was accepted as a language of high culture and the preferred language by some of the local ruling elites in these regions. According to the Dalai Lama, the Sanskrit language is a parent language that is at the foundation of many modern languages of India and the one that promoted Indian thought to other distant countries. In Tibetan Buddhism, states the Dalai Lama, Sanskrit language has been a revered one and called legjar lhai-ka or "elegant language of the gods". It has been the means of transmitting the "profound wisdom of Buddhist philosophy" to Tibet.

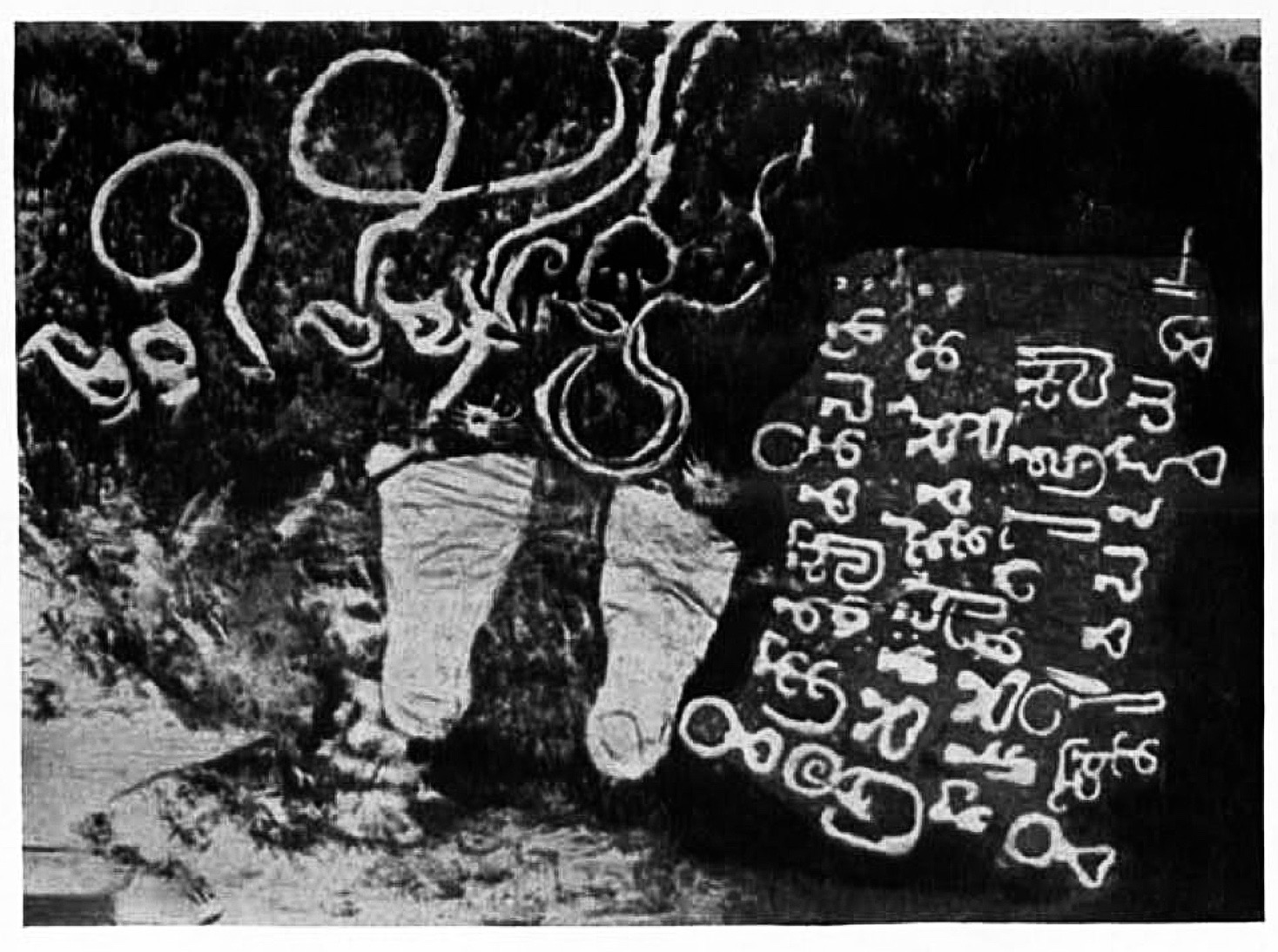
A 5th-century Sanskrit inscription discovered in Java, Indonesia—one of the earliest in southeast Asia after the Mulavarman inscription discovered in Kutai, eastern Borneo. The Ciaruteun inscription combines two writing scripts and compares the king to the Hindu god Vishnu. It provides a terminus ad quem to the presence of Hinduism in the Indonesian islands. The oldest southeast Asian Sanskrit inscription—called the Vo Canh inscription—so far discovered is near Nha Trang, Vietnam, and it is dated to the late 4th century to early 5th century CE.

The Sanskrit language created a pan-Indo-Aryan accessibility to information and knowledge in the ancient and medieval times, in contrast to the Prakrit languages which were understood just regionally. It created a cultural bond across the subcontinent. As local languages and dialects evolved and diversified, Sanskrit served as the common language. It connected scholars from distant parts of South Asia such as Tamil Nadu and Kashmir, states Deshpande, as well as those from different fields of studies, though there must have been differences in its pronunciation given the first language of the respective speakers. The Sanskrit language brought Indo-Aryan speaking people together, particularly its elite scholars. Some of these scholars of Indian history regionally produced vernacularised Sanskrit to reach wider audiences, as evidenced by texts discovered in Rajasthan, Gujarat, and Maharashtra. Once the audience became familiar with the easier to understand vernacularised version of Sanskrit, those interested could graduate from colloquial Sanskrit to the more advanced Classical Sanskrit. Rituals and the rites-of-passage ceremonies have been and continue to be the other occasions where a wide spectrum of people hear Sanskrit, and occasionally join in to speak some Sanskrit words such as namah.

Classical Sanskrit is the standard register as laid out in the grammar of Pāṇini, around the fourth century BCE. Its position in the cultures of Greater India is akin to that of Latin and Ancient Greek in Europe. Sanskrit has significantly influenced most modern languages of the Indian subcontinent, particularly the languages of the northern, western, central and eastern Indian subcontinent.

=== Decline ===
The decline of Sanskrit began in the 13th century. This coincides with the beginning of Islamic invasions of South Asia to create, and thereafter expand the Muslim rule in the form of Sultanates, and later the Mughal Empire. Sheldon Pollock characterises the decline of Sanskrit as a long-term "cultural, social, and political change". He dismisses the idea that Sanskrit declined due to "struggle with barbarous invaders", and emphasises factors such as the increasing attractiveness of vernacular language for literary expression.

With the fall of Kashmir around the 13th century, a premier centre of Sanskrit literary creativity, Sanskrit literature there disappeared, perhaps in the "fires that periodically engulfed the capital of Kashmir" or the "Mongol invasion of 1320" states Pollock. The dissemination of Sanskrit literature from the northwest regions of the subcontinent stopped after the 12th century. As Hindu kingdoms fell in eastern and southern India, such as the great Vijayanagara Empire, so did Sanskrit. There were exceptions and short periods of imperial support for Sanskrit, mostly concentrated during the reign of the tolerant Mughal emperor Akbar. Muslim rulers patronised the Middle Eastern language and scripts found in Persia and Arabia, and the Indians linguistically adapted to this Persianization to gain employment with the Muslim rulers. Hindu rulers such as Shivaji of the Maratha Empire, reversed the process, by re-adopting Sanskrit and re-asserting their socio-linguistic identity. After Islamic rule disintegrated in South Asia and the colonial rule era began, Sanskrit re-emerged but in the form of a "ghostly existence" in regions such as Bengal. This decline was the result of "political institutions and civic ethos" that did not support the historic Sanskrit literary culture and the failure of new Sanskrit literature to assimilate into the changing cultural and political environment.

Sheldon Pollock states that in some crucial way, "Sanskrit is dead". After the 12th century, the Sanskrit literary works were reduced to "reinscription and restatements" of ideas already explored, and any creativity was restricted to hymns and verses. This contrasted with the previous 1,500 years when "great experiments in moral and aesthetic imagination" marked the Indian scholarship using Classical Sanskrit, states Pollock.

Some scholars maintain that the Sanskrit language did not die, but rather only declined. Jurgen Hanneder disagrees with Pollock, finding his arguments elegant but "often arbitrary". According to Hanneder, a decline or regional absence of creative and innovative literature constitutes a negative evidence to Pollock's hypothesis, but it is not positive evidence. A closer look at Sanskrit in the Indian history after the 12th century suggests that Sanskrit survived despite the odds. According to Hanneder,

On a more public level the statement that Sanskrit is a dead language is misleading, for Sanskrit is quite obviously not as dead as other dead languages and the fact that it is spoken, written and read will probably convince most people that it cannot be a dead language in the most common usage of the term. Pollock's notion of the "death of Sanskrit" remains in this unclear realm between academia and public opinion when he says that "most observers would agree that, in some crucial way, Sanskrit is dead."

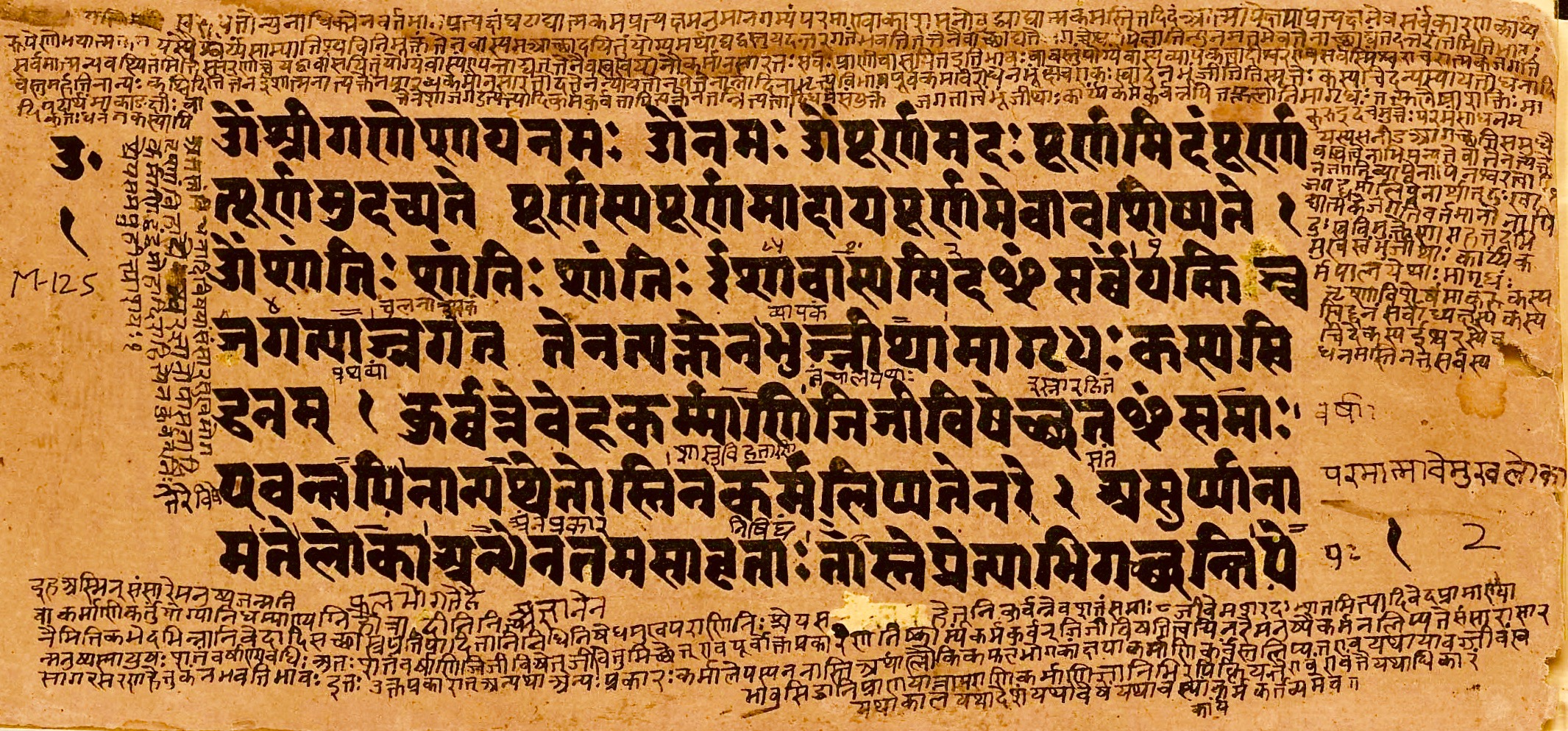
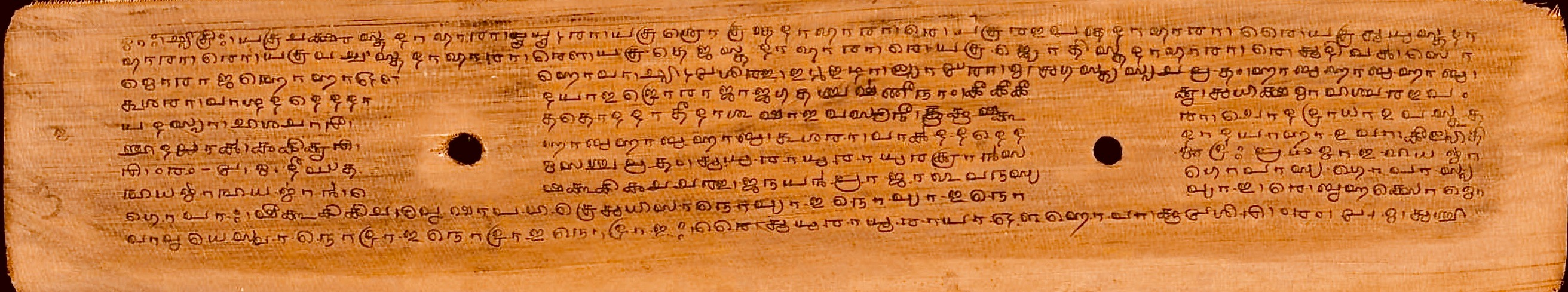
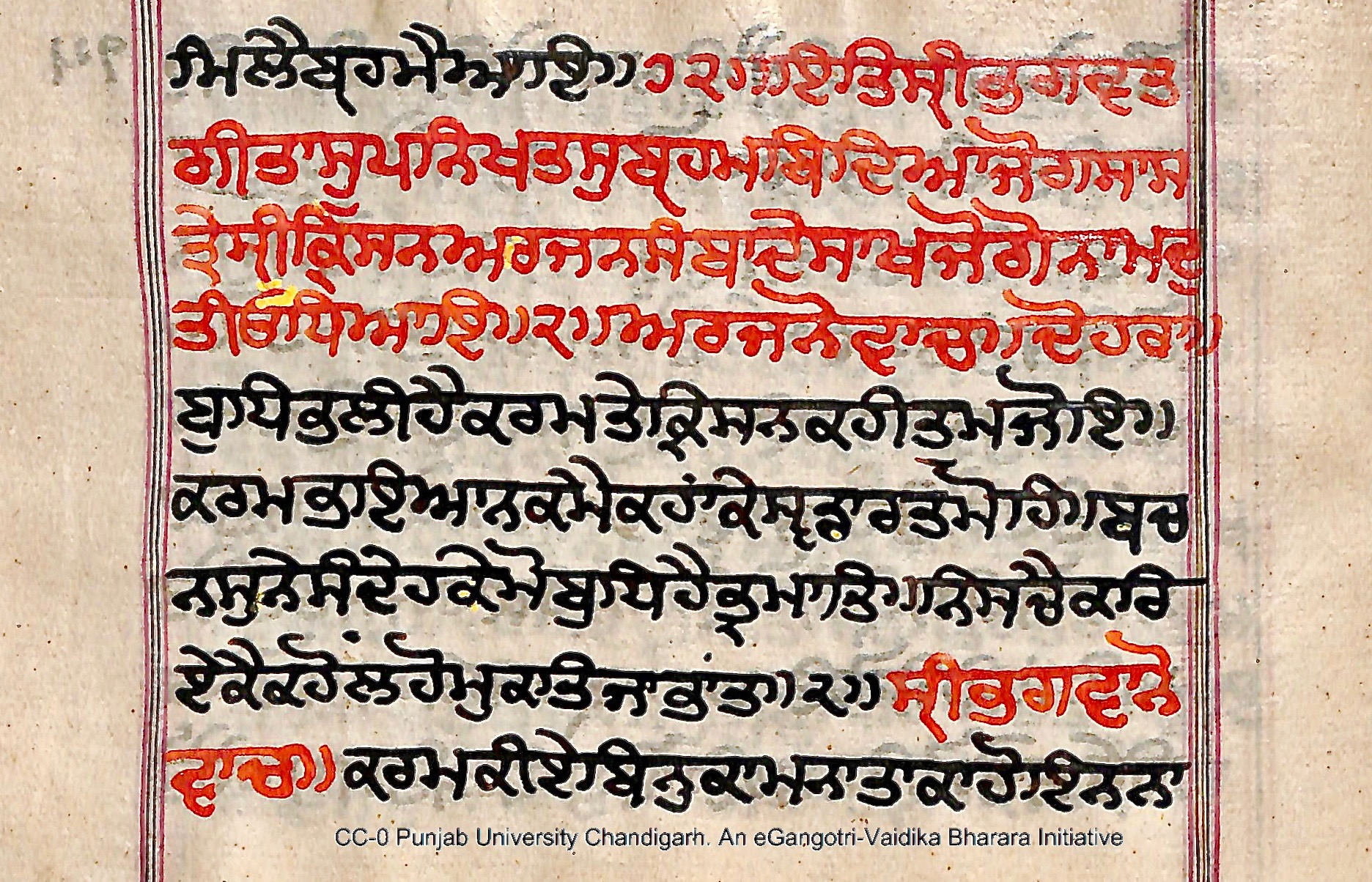
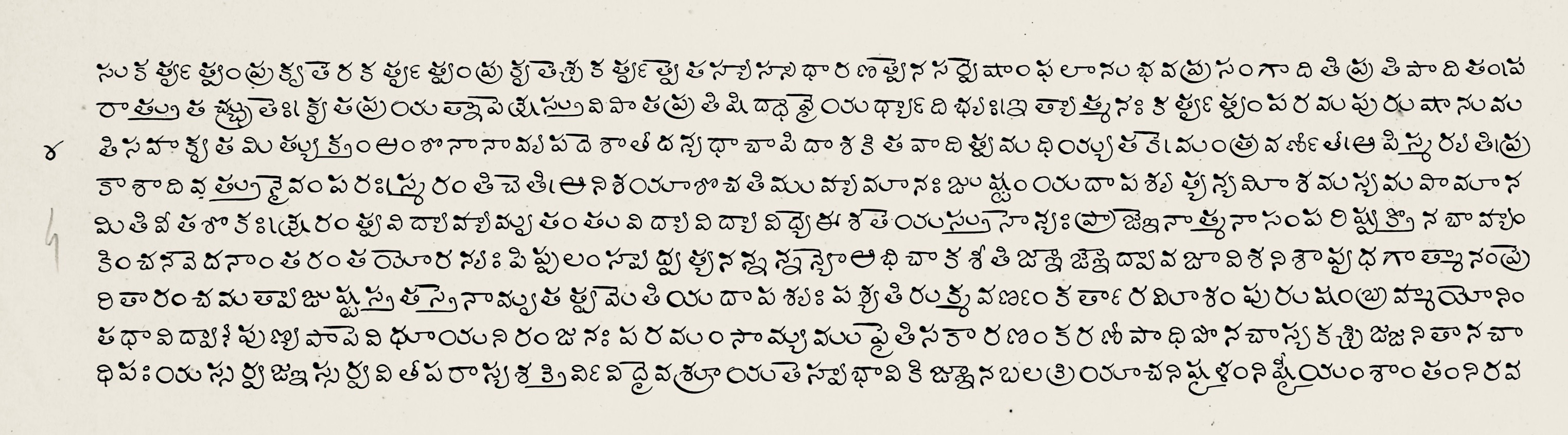
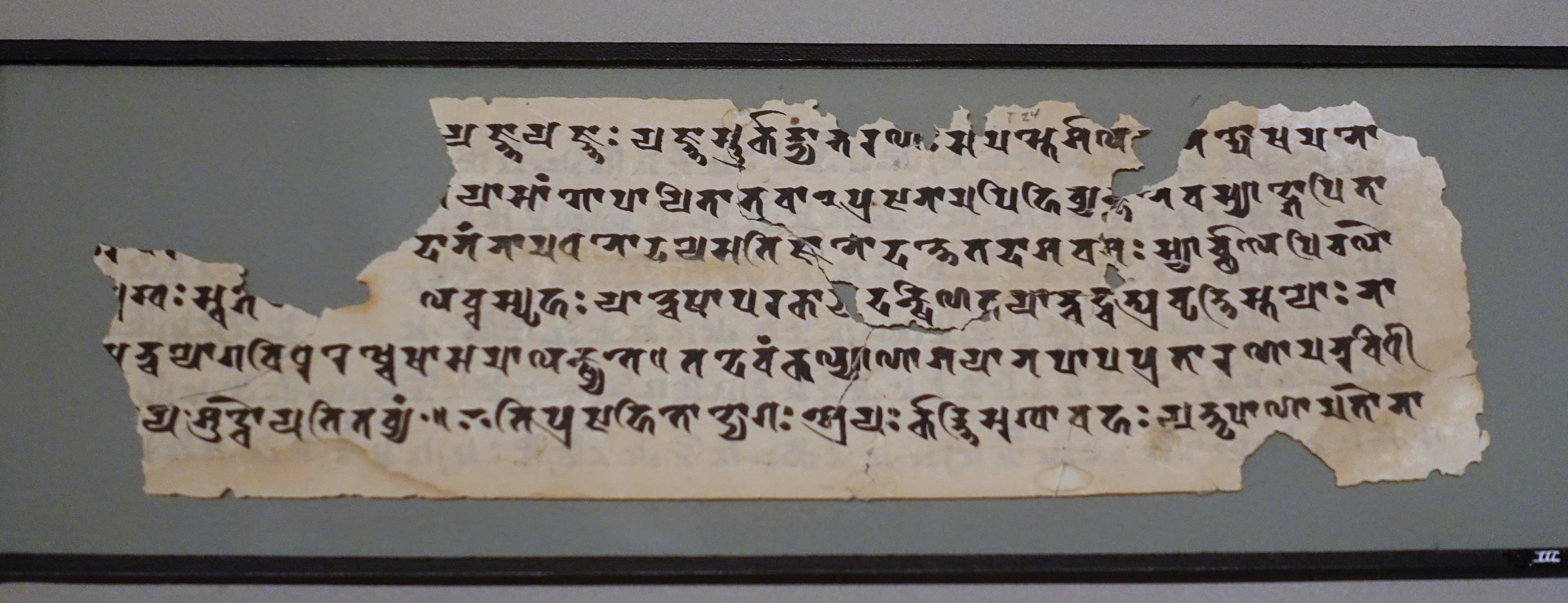
Sanskrit language manuscripts exist in many scripts. Above from top: Isha Upanishad (Devanagari), Samaveda (Tamil Grantha), Bhagavad Gita (Gurmukhi), Vedanta Sara (Telugu), Jatakamala (early Sharada). All are Hindu texts except the last Buddhist text.

The Sanskrit language scholar Moriz Winternitz states that Sanskrit was never a dead language and it is still alive though its prevalence is lesser than ancient and medieval times. Sanskrit remains an integral part of Hindu journals, festivals, Ramlila plays, drama, rituals and the rites-of-passage. Similarly, Brian Hatcher states that the "metaphors of historical rupture" by Pollock are not valid, that there is ample proof that Sanskrit was very much alive in the narrow confines of surviving Hindu kingdoms between the 13th and 18th centuries, and its reverence and tradition continues.

Hanneder states that modern works in Sanskrit are either ignored or their "modernity" contested.

According to Robert P. Goldman and Sally Sutherland, Sanskrit is neither "dead" nor "living" in the conventional sense. It is a special, timeless language that lives in the numerous manuscripts, daily chants, and ceremonial recitations, a heritage language that Indians contextually prize, and which some practice.

When the British introduced English to India in the 19th century, knowledge of Sanskrit and ancient literature continued to flourish as the study of Sanskrit changed from a more traditional style into a form of analytical and comparative scholarship mirroring that of Europe.

=== Modern Indo-Aryan languages ===
The relationship of Sanskrit to the Prakrit languages, particularly the modern form of Indian languages, is complex and spans about 3,500 years, states Colin Masica—a linguist specialising in South Asian languages. A part of the difficulty is the lack of sufficient textual, archaeological and epigraphical evidence for the ancient Prakrit languages with rare exceptions such as Pali, leading to a tendency toward anachronistic errors. Sanskrit and Prakrit languages may be divided into Old Indo-Aryan (1500 BCE – 600 BCE), Middle Indo-Aryan (600 BCE – 1000 CE) and New Indo-Aryan (1000 CE – present), each can further be subdivided into early, middle or second, and late evolutionary substages.

Vedic Sanskrit belongs to the early Old Indo-Aryan stage, while Classical Sanskrit to the later Old Indo-Aryan stage. The evidence for Prakrits such as Pali (Theravada Buddhism) and Ardhamagadhi (Jainism), along with Magadhi, Maharashtri, Sinhala, Sauraseni and Niya (Gandhari), emerge in the Middle Indo-Aryan stage in two versions—archaic and more formalised—that may be placed in early and middle substages of the 600 BCE – 1000 CE period. Two literary Indo-Aryan languages can be traced to the late Middle Indo-Aryan stage and these are Apabhramsa and Elu (a literary form of Sinhalese). Numerous North, Central, Eastern and Western Indian languages, such as Hindi, Gujarati, Sindhi, Punjabi, Kashmiri, Nepali, Braj, Awadhi, Bengali, Assamese, Oriya, Marathi, and others belong to the New Indo-Aryan stage.

There is an extensive overlap in the vocabulary, phonetics and other aspects of these New Indo-Aryan languages with Sanskrit, but it is neither universal nor identical across the languages. They likely emerged from a synthesis of the ancient Sanskrit language traditions and an admixture of various regional dialects. Each language has some unique and regionally creative aspects, with unclear origins. Prakrit languages do have a grammatical structure, but like Vedic Sanskrit, it is far less rigorous than Classical Sanskrit. While the roots of all Prakrit languages may be in Vedic Sanskrit and ultimately the Proto-Indo-Aryan language, their structural details vary from Classical Sanskrit. It is generally accepted by scholars and widely believed in India that the modern Indo-Aryan languages – such as Bengali, Gujarati, Hindi, and Punjabi – are descendants of the Sanskrit language. Sanskrit, states Burjor Avari, can be described as "the mother language of almost all the languages of north India".

== Geographic distribution ==
Sanskrit language's historical presence has been attested in many countries. The evidence includes manuscript pages and inscriptions discovered in South Asia, Southeast Asia and Central Asia. These have been dated between 300 and 1800 CE.

The Sanskrit language's historic presence is attested across a wide geography beyond South Asia. Inscriptions and literary evidence suggests that Sanskrit language was already being adopted in Southeast Asia and Central Asia in the 1st millennium CE, through monks, religious pilgrims and merchants.

South Asia has been the geographic range of the largest collection of the ancient and pre-18th-century Sanskrit manuscripts and inscriptions. Beyond ancient India, significant collections of Sanskrit manuscripts and inscriptions have been found in China (particularly the Tibetan monasteries), Myanmar, Indonesia, Cambodia, Laos, Vietnam, Thailand, and Malaysia. Sanskrit inscriptions, manuscripts or its remnants, including some of the oldest known Sanskrit written texts, have been discovered in dry high deserts and mountainous terrains such as in Nepal, (Note: The oldest surviving Sanskrit inscription in the Kathmandu valley is dated to 464 CE.) Tibet, Afghanistan, Mongolia, Uzbekistan, Turkmenistan, Tajikistan, and Kazakhstan. Some Sanskrit texts and inscriptions have also been discovered in Korea and Japan.

=== Official status ===
In India, Sanskrit is among the 22 official languages of India in the Eighth Schedule to the Constitution. In 2010, Uttarakhand became the first state in India to make Sanskrit its second official language. In 2019, Himachal Pradesh made Sanskrit its second official language, becoming the second state in India to do so.

== Phonology ==
Sanskrit shares many Proto-Indo-European phonological features, although it features a larger inventory of distinct phonemes. The consonantal system is the same, though it systematically enlarged the inventory of distinct sounds. For example, Sanskrit added a voiceless aspirated "tʰ", to the voiceless "t", voiced "d" and voiced aspirated "dʰ" found in PIE languages.

The most significant and distinctive phonological development in Sanskrit is vowel merger. The short *e, *o and *a, all merge as a (अ) in Sanskrit, while long *ē, *ō and *ā, all merge as long ā (आ). Compare Sanskrit nāman to Latin nōmen. These mergers occurred very early and significantly affected Sanskrit's morphological system. Some phonological developments in it mirror those in other PIE languages. For example, the labiovelars merged with the plain velars as in other satem languages. The secondary palatalisation of the resulting segments is more thorough and systematic within Sanskrit. For example, unlike the loss of the morphological clarity from vowel contraction that is found in early Greek and related southeast European languages, Sanskrit deployed *y, *w, and *s intervocalically to provide morphological clarity.

=== Vowels ===
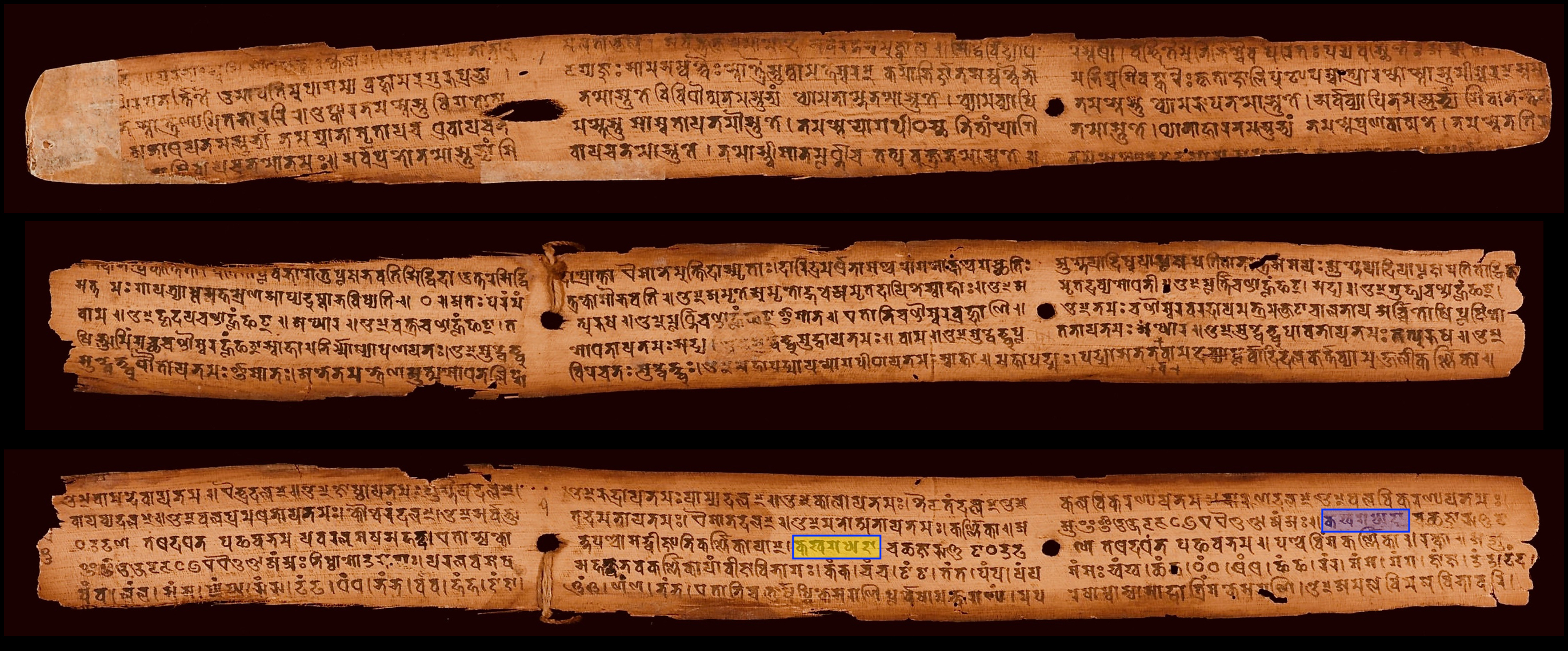
This is one of the oldest surviving and dated palm-leaf manuscripts in Sanskrit (828 CE). Discovered in Nepal, the bottom leaf shows all the vowels and consonants of Sanskrit (the first five consonants are highlighted in blue and yellow).

The cardinal vowels (svaras) a (अ), i (इ), and u (उ) distinguish length in Sanskrit. The short a (अ) in Sanskrit is a closer vowel than ā, equivalent to schwa. The mid vowels ē (ए) and ō (ओ) in Sanskrit are monophthongizations of the Indo-Iranian diphthongs *ai and *au. They are inherently long, though often transcribed e and o without the diacritic. The vocalic liquid r̥ in Sanskrit is a merger of PIE *r̥ and *l̥. The long r̥ is an innovation and it is used in a few analogically generated morphological categories.

Sanskrit vowels in the Devanagari script (Note: Sanskrit is written in many scripts. Sounds in grey are not phonemic.)
	Independent form	IAST/ ISO	IPA	Independent form	IAST/ ISO	IPA
kaṇṭhya (Velar)	अ	a	/ɐ/	आ	ā	/ɑː/
tālavya (Palatal)	इ	i	/i/	ई	ī	/iː/
oṣṭhya (Labial)	उ	u	/u/	ऊ	ū	/uː/
mūrdhanya (Retroflex)	ऋ	ṛ/r̥	/r̩/	ॠ	ṝ/r̥̄	/r̩ː/
dantya (Dental)	ऌ	ḷ/l̥	/l̩/	ॡ	ḹ/l̥̄ (Note: The long /l̩ː/ vowel represented by ॡ ḹ does not actually occur in any Sanskrit words; however, it was traditionally hypothesised by grammarians in order to maintain symmetry between the pairs of short and long vowels.)	/l̩ː/
kaṇṭhatālavya (Palatovelar)	ए	e/ē	/eː/	ऐ	ai	/ɑj/
kaṇṭhoṣṭhya (Labiovelar)	ओ	o/ō	/oː/	औ	au	/ɑw/
(consonantal allophones)	ं	ṃ/ṁ	/◌̃/	ः	ḥ	/h/

According to Masica, Sanskrit has four traditional semivowels, with which were classed, "for morphophonemic reasons, the liquids: y, r, l, and v; that is, as y and v were the non-syllabics corresponding to i, u, so were r, l in relation to r̥ and l̥". The northwestern, the central and the eastern Sanskrit dialects have had a historic confusion between "r" and "l". The Paninian system that followed the central dialect preserved the distinction, likely out of reverence for the Vedic Sanskrit that distinguished the "r" and "l". However, the northwestern dialect only had "r", while the eastern dialect probably only had "l", states Masica. Thus literary works from different parts of ancient India appear inconsistent in their use of "r" and "l", resulting in doublets that are occasionally semantically differentiated.

The nasal 'ṃ' is optionally the corresponding nasal consonant before plosives (aṃ + k = aṅk or am k) and an 'm'-sound before r, s, ś, ṣ, and h. Before y, l, v, it can cause nasalisation and gemination (am + y = aỹy or am y).

=== Consonants ===
Sanskrit consonants are conventionally arranged into a symmetrical table that is based on how the sound is articulated, though this arrangement is somewhat forced in that it conceals a certain lack of parallelism among the actual sounds.

Sanskrit consonants in the Devanagari script
	sparśa (Plosive)								anunāsika (Nasal)		antastha (Approximant)		ūṣman/saṅgharṣī (Fricative)			
Voicing →	aghoṣa				ghoṣa								aghoṣa		ghoṣa	
Aspiration →	alpaprāṇa		mahāprāṇa		alpaprāṇa		mahāprāṇa		alpaprāṇa				mahāprāṇa			
kaṇṭhya (Velar)	क	ka [k]	ख	kha [kʰ]	ग	ga [ɡ]	घ	gha [ɡʱ]	ङ	ṅa [ŋ]			ᳲक	ẖka [x]	ह	ha [ɦ]
tālavya (Palatal)	च	ca [t͜ɕ]	छ	cha [t͜ɕʰ]	ज	ja [d͜ʑ]	झ	jha [d͜ʑʱ]	ञ	ña [ɲ]	य	ya [j]	श	śa [ɕ]		
mūrdhanya (Retroflex)	ट	ṭa [ʈ]	ठ	ṭha [ʈʰ]	ड	ḍa [ɖ]	ढ	ḍha [ɖʱ]	ण	ṇa [ɳ]	र	ra [ɾ]	ष	ṣa [ʂ]		
dantya (Dental)	त	ta [t]	थ	tha [tʰ]	द	da [d]	ध	dha [dʱ]	न	na [n]	ल	la [l]	स	sa [s]		
oṣṭhya (Labial)	प	pa [p]	फ	pha [pʰ]	ब	ba [b]	भ	bha [bʱ]	म	ma [m]	व	va [ʋ]	ᳲप	ḫpa [ɸ]		

The system of Sanskrit Sounds
[The alphabetic] order of Sanskrit sounds works along three principles: it goes from simple to complex; it goes from the back to the front of the mouth; and it groups similar sounds together. [...] Among themselves, both the vowels and consonants are ordered according to where in the mouth they are pronounced, going from back to front.

— A. M. Ruppel, The Cambridge Introduction to Sanskrit
- Sanskrit has a series of retroflex stops originating as conditioned alternants of dentals.
- jh is a marginal phoneme in Sanskrit occurring mostly from loanwords, hence its phonology is more difficult to reconstruct; it was more commonly employed in the Middle Indo-Aryan languages as a result of phonological processes resulting in the phoneme, e.g. jajjhatī jhaṣa.
- The palatal and velar nasals are conditioned variant of n occurring next to palatal and velar obstruents mostly, but there are some onomatopoeic words with them like ña, ṅa, ṅu and inflections like ñuṅūṣate, prāṅ.
- The anusvara that Sanskrit deploys is a conditioned alternant of post-vocalic nasals, under certain sandhi conditions.
- The visarga is a word-final or morpheme-final conditioned alternant of s and r under certain sandhi conditions.
- The voiceless aspirated series is also an innovation in Sanskrit but is rarer than the other three series.
- While the Sanskrit language organises sounds for expression beyond those found in the PIE language, it retained many features found in the Iranian and Balto-Slavic languages. An example of a similar process in all three is the retroflex sibilant ʂ being the automatic product of dental s following i, u, r, and k.

=== Phonological alternations, sandhi rules ===
Sanskrit deploys extensive phonological alternations on different linguistic levels through sandhi rules (literally, the rules of "putting together, union, connection, alliance"), similar to the English alteration of "going to" as gonna. The Sanskrit language accepts such alterations within it, but offers formal rules for the sandhi of any two words next to each other in the same sentence or linking two sentences. The external sandhi rules state that similar short vowels coalesce into a single long vowel, while dissimilar vowels form glides or undergo diphthongisation. Among the consonants, most external sandhi rules recommend regressive assimilation for clarity when they are voiced. These rules ordinarily apply at compound seams and morpheme boundaries. In Vedic Sanskrit, the external sandhi rules are more variable than in Classical Sanskrit.

=== Vedic Pitch Accent ===
How Sanskrit chants sound
A recitation of the Sanskrit composition Guru Stotram, or "the hymn of praise for the teacher (guru)". (4 min 55 s)

Vedic Sanskrit included a three-way free pitch accent system of udātta (raised), anudātta (not-raised or grave), and svarita (sounded) which were high, low and falling pitches respectively. Each word generally had one udātta accent except for certain compound words, with the svarita (if any) always following an udātta. The classical language ultimately lost this system, resulting in it being preserved only in Vedic chants and phonological treatises. However, the same traditional chanting that preserved the accents renders the udātta as an unaccented mid-tone and the first half of the svarita as higher than an udātta; the other half is rendered at the same pitch as that of the new udātta.

=== Classical Stress Accent ===
In the classical language, there is a predictable system of stress accent similar to Latin, in which the penultimate syllable is stressed if it is metrically heavy and the antepenultimate if it is light. Unlike in Latin, however, if the antepenultimate is also light (and is not the start of the word), then the preantepenultimate is stressed instead, regardless of weight. For example, bharā́mi, bharánti, bhárati, udvéjayati, and dúhitaram (as opposed to their Vedic pitch accentuations of bhárāmi, duhitáram, etc.).

== Morphology ==
The basis of Sanskrit morphology is the root, states Jamison, "a morpheme bearing lexical meaning". The verbal and nominal stems of Sanskrit words are derived from this root through the phonological vowel-gradation processes, the addition of affixes, verbal and nominal stems. It then adds an ending to establish the grammatical and syntactic identity of the stem. According to Jamison, the "three major formal elements of the morphology are (i) root, (ii) affix, and (iii) ending; and they are roughly responsible for (i) lexical meaning, (ii) derivation, and (iii) inflection respectively".

A Sanskrit word has the following canonical structure:

Root + Affix_{0-n} + Ending_{0–1}

The root structure has certain phonological constraints. Two of the most important constraints of a "root" is that it does not end in a short "a" (अ) and that it is monosyllabic. In contrast, the affixes and endings commonly do. The affixes in Sanskrit are almost always suffixes, with exceptions such as the augment "a-" added as prefix to past tense verb forms and the "-na/n-" infix in single verbal present class, states Jamison.

Sanskrit verbs have the following canonical structure:

Root + Suffix_{Tense-Aspect} + Suffix_{Mood} + Ending_{Personal-Number-Voice}

According to Ruppel, verbs in Sanskrit express the same information as other Indo-European languages such as English. Sanskrit verbs describe an action or occurrence or state, its embedded morphology informs as to "who is doing it" (person or persons), "when it is done" (tense) and "how it is done" (mood, voice). The Indo-European languages differ in the detail. For example, the Sanskrit language attaches the affixes and ending to the verb root, while the English language adds small independent words before the verb. In Sanskrit, these elements co-exist within the word. (Note: The "root + affix" is called the "stem".)

Word morphology in Sanskrit, A. M. Ruppel (Note: Other equivalents: bharāmi (I carry), bharati (he carries), bharāmas (we carry). Similar morphology is found in some other Indo-European languages; for example, in the Gothic language, baira (I carry), bairis (you carry), bairiþ (he carries).)
	Sanskrit word equivalent	
English expression	IAST/ISO	Devanagari
you carry	bharasi	भरसि
they carry	bharanti	भरन्ति
you will carry	bhariṣyasi	भरिष्यसि

Both verbs and nouns in Sanskrit are either thematic or athematic, states Jamison. Guna (strengthened) forms in the active singular regularly alternate in athematic verbs. The finite verbs of Classical Sanskrit have the following grammatical categories: person, number, voice, tense-aspect, and mood. According to Jamison, a portmanteau morpheme generally expresses the person-number-voice in Sanskrit, and sometimes also the ending or only the ending. The mood of the word is embedded in the affix.

These elements of word architecture are the typical building blocks in Classical Sanskrit, but in Vedic Sanskrit these elements fluctuate and are unclear. For example, in the Rigveda preverbs regularly occur in tmesis, states Jamison, which means they are "separated from the finite verb". This indecisiveness is likely linked to Vedic Sanskrit's attempt to incorporate accent. With nonfinite forms of the verb and with nominal derivatives thereof, states Jamison, "preverbs show much clearer univerbation in Vedic, both by position and by accent, and by Classical Sanskrit, tmesis is no longer possible even with finite forms".

While roots are typical in Sanskrit, some words do not follow the canonical structure. A few forms lack both inflection and root. Many words are inflected (and can enter into derivation) but lack a recognisable root. Examples from the basic vocabulary include kinship terms such as mātar- (mother), nas- (nose), śvan- (dog). According to Jamison, pronouns and some words outside the semantic categories also lack roots, as do the numerals. Similarly, the Sanskrit language is flexible enough to not mandate inflection.

The Sanskrit words can contain more than one affix that interact with each other. Affixes in Sanskrit can be athematic as well as thematic, according to Jamison. Athematic affixes can be alternating. Sanskrit deploys eight cases, namely nominative, accusative, instrumental, dative, ablative, genitive, locative, vocative.

Stems, that is "root + affix", appear in two categories in Sanskrit: vowel stems and consonant stems. Unlike some Indo-European languages such as Latin or Greek, according to Jamison, "Sanskrit has no closed set of conventionally denoted noun declensions". Sanskrit includes a fairly large set of stem-types. The linguistic interaction of the roots, the phonological segments, lexical items and the grammar for the Classical Sanskrit consist of four Paninian components. These, states Paul Kiparsky, are the Astadhyaayi, a comprehensive system of 4,000 grammatical rules, of which a small set are frequently used; Sivasutras, an inventory of anubandhas (markers) that partition phonological segments for efficient abbreviations through the pratyharas technique; Dhatupatha, a list of 2,000 verbal roots classified by their morphology and syntactic properties using diacritic markers, a structure that guides its writing systems; and, the Ganapatha, an inventory of word groups, classes of lexical systems. There are peripheral adjuncts to these four, such as the Unadisutras, which focus on irregularly formed derivatives from the roots.

Sanskrit morphology is generally studied in two broad fundamental categories: the nominal forms and the verbal forms. These differ in the types of endings and what these endings mark in the grammatical context. Pronouns and nouns share the same grammatical categories, though they may differ in inflection. Verb-based adjectives and participles are not formally distinct from nouns. Adverbs are typically frozen case forms of adjectives, states Jamison, and "nonfinite verbal forms such as infinitives and gerunds also clearly show frozen nominal case endings".

=== Verbal forms ===
The Sanskrit language includes five tenses: present, future, past imperfect, past aorist and past perfect. It outlines three types of voices: active, passive and the middle. The middle is also referred to as the mediopassive, or more formally in Sanskrit as parasmaipada (word for another) and atmanepada (word for oneself).

Voice in Sanskrit, Stephanie Jamison (Note: Ruppel gives the following endings for the "present indicative active" in the Sanskrit language: 1st dual: -vaḥ, 1st plural: -maḥ, 2nd dual: -thaḥ, 2nd plural: -tha and so on.)
	Active			Middle (Mediopassive)		
	Singular	Dual	Plural	Singular	Dual	Plural
1st person	-mi	-vaḥ	-maḥ	-e	-vahe	-mahe
2nd person	-si	-thaḥ	-tha	-se	-āthe	-dhve
3rd person	-ti	-taḥ	-anti	-te	-āte	-ante

The paradigm for the tense-aspect system in Sanskrit is the three-way contrast between the "present", the "aorist" and the "perfect" architecture. Vedic Sanskrit is more elaborate and had several additional tenses. For example, the Rigveda includes perfect and a marginal pluperfect. Classical Sanskrit simplifies the "present" system down to two tenses, the perfect and the imperfect, while the "aorist" stems retain the aorist tense and the "perfect" stems retain the perfect and marginal pluperfect. The classical version of the language has elaborate rules for both voice and the tense-aspect system to emphasise clarity, and this is more elaborate than in other Indo-European languages. The evolution of these systems can be seen from the earliest layers of the Vedic literature to the late Vedic literature.

The three verbal moods in Sanskrit are indicative, potential (optative), and imperative.

=== Nominal forms ===
Sanskrit recognises three numbers—singular, dual, and plural. The dual is a fully functioning category, used beyond naturally paired objects such as hands or eyes, extending to any collection of two. The elliptical dual is notable in the Vedic Sanskrit, according to Jamison, where a noun in the dual signals a paired opposition. Illustrations include dyāvā (literally, "the two heavens" for heaven-and-earth), mātarā (literally, "the two mothers" for mother-and-father). A verb may be singular, dual or plural, while the person recognised in the language are forms of "I", "you", "he/she/it", "we" and "they".

There are three persons in Sanskrit: first, second and third. Sanskrit uses the 3×3 grid formed by the three numbers and the three persons parameters as the paradigm and the basic building block of its verbal system.

The Sanskrit language incorporates three genders: feminine, masculine and neuter. All nouns have inherent gender. With some exceptions, personal pronouns have no gender. Exceptions include demonstrative and anaphoric pronouns. Derivation of a word is used to express the feminine. Two most common derivations come from feminine-forming suffixes, the -ā- (आ, Rādhā) and -ī- (ई, Rukminī). The masculine and neuter are much simpler, and the difference between them is primarily inflectional. Similar affixes for the feminine are found in many Indo-European languages, states Burrow, suggesting links of the Sanskrit to its PIE heritage.

Pronouns in Sanskrit include the personal pronouns of the first and second persons, unmarked for gender, and a larger number of gender-distinguishing pronouns and adjectives. Examples of the former include ahám (first singular), vayám (first plural) and yūyám (second plural). The latter can be demonstrative, deictic or anaphoric. Both the Vedic and Classical Sanskrit share the sá/tám pronominal stem, and this is the closest element to a third person pronoun and an article in the Sanskrit language, states Jamison.

=== Prosody, metre ===
The Sanskrit language formally incorporates poetic metres. By the late Vedic era, this developed into a field of study; it was central to the composition of the Hindu literature, including the later Vedic texts. This study of Sanskrit prosody is called chandas, and is considered one of the six Vedangas, or limbs of Vedic studies.

There is no word without metre,
nor is there any metre without words.

— Natya Shastra

Sanskrit metres include those based on a fixed number of syllables per verse, and those based on fixed number of morae per verse. The Vedic Sanskrit employs fifteen metres, of which seven are common, and the most frequent are three (8-, 11- and 12-syllable lines). The Classical Sanskrit deploys both linear and non-linear metres, many of which are based on syllables and others based on diligently crafted verses based on repeating numbers of morae (matra per foot).

== Writing system ==
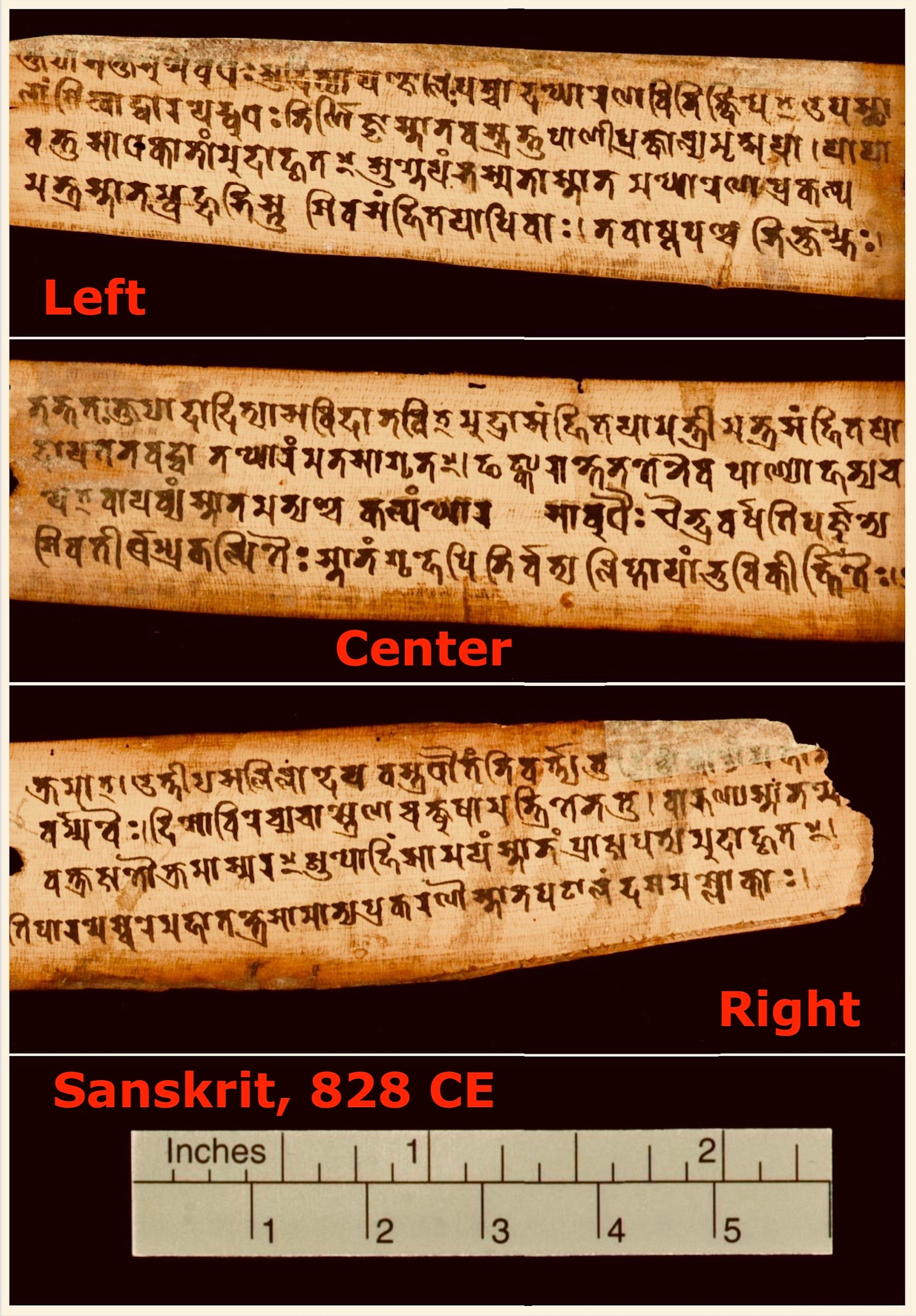
One of the oldest surviving Sanskrit manuscript pages in Gupta script (c. 828 CE), discovered in Nepal

The early history of writing Sanskrit and other languages in ancient India is a problematic topic despite a century of scholarship, states Richard Salomon – an epigraphist and Indologist specialising in Sanskrit and Pali literature. The earliest possible script from South Asia is from the Indus Valley civilisation (3rd/2nd millennium BCE), but this script – if it is a script – remains undeciphered. If any scripts existed in the Vedic period, they have not survived. Scholars generally accept that Sanskrit was spoken in an oral society, and that an oral tradition preserved the extensive Vedic and Classical Sanskrit literature. Other scholars such as Jack Goody argue that the Vedic Sanskrit texts are not the product of an oral society, basing this view by comparing inconsistencies in the transmitted versions of literature from various oral societies such as the Greek (Greco-Sanskrit), Serbian, and other cultures. This minority of scholars argue that the Vedic literature is too consistent and vast to have been composed and transmitted orally across generations, without having been written down.

Lipi is the term in Sanskrit which means "writing, letters, alphabet". It contextually refers to scripts, the art or any manner of writing or drawing. The term, in the sense of a writing system, appears in some of the earliest Buddhist, Hindu, and Jaina texts. Pāṇini's Astadhyayi, composed sometime around the 5th or 4th century BCE, for example, mentions lipi in the context of a writing script and education system in his times, but he does not name the script. Several early Buddhist and Jaina texts, such as the Lalitavistara Sūtra and Pannavana Sutta, include lists of numerous writing scripts in ancient India. (Note: The Buddhist text Lalitavistara Sūtra describes the young Siddhartha—the future Buddha—to have mastered philology and scripts at a school from Brahmin Lipikara and Deva Vidyasinha.) The Buddhist texts list the sixty-four lipi that the Buddha knew as a child, with the Brahmi script topping the list. "The historical value of this list is, however, limited by several factors", states Salomon. The list may be a later interpolation. (Note: A version of this list of sixty-four ancient Indian scripts is found in the Chinese translation of an Indian Buddhist text, and this translation has been dated to 308 CE.) The Jain canonical texts such as the Pannavana Sutta – probably older than the Buddhist texts – list eighteen writing systems, with the Brahmi topping the list and Kharotthi (Kharoshthi) listed as fourth. The Jaina text elsewhere states that the "Brahmi is written in 18 different forms", but the details are lacking. However, the reliability of these lists has been questioned and the empirical evidence of writing systems in the form of Sanskrit or Prakrit inscriptions dated before the 3rd century BCE has not been found. If the ancient surfaces for writing Sanskrit were palm leaves, tree bark, and cloth – the same as those in later times – these have not survived. (Note: The Greek Nearchos who visited ancient India with the army of Alexander the Great in the 4th century BCE, mentions that Indians wrote on cloth, but Nearchos could have confused Aramaic writers with the Indians.) According to Salomon, many find it difficult to explain the "evidently high level of political organization and cultural complexity" of ancient India without a writing system for Sanskrit and other languages. (Note: Salomon writes, in The World's Writing Systems (edited by Peter Daniels), that "many scholars feel that the origins of these scripts must have gone back further than this [mid-3rd century BCE Ashoka inscriptions], but there is no conclusive proof".)

The oldest datable writing systems for Sanskrit are the Brāhmī script, the related Kharoṣṭhī script and the Brahmi derivatives. The Kharosthi was used in the northwestern part of South Asia and it became extinct, while the Brahmi was used all over the subcontinent along with regional scripts such as Old Tamil. Of these, the earliest records in the Sanskrit language are in Brahmi, a script that later evolved into numerous related Indic scripts for Sanskrit, along with Southeast Asian scripts (Burmese, Thai, Lao, Khmer, others) and many extinct Central Asian scripts such as those discovered along with the Kharosthi in the Tarim Basin of western China and in Uzbekistan. The most extensive inscriptions that have survived into the modern era are the rock edicts and pillar inscriptions of the 3rd century BCE Mauryan emperor Ashoka, but these are not in Sanskrit. (Note: Minor inscriptions discovered in the 20th century may be older, but their dating is uncertain.)

=== Scripts ===
Over the centuries, and across countries, a number of scripts have been used to write Sanskrit.

==== Brahmi script ====
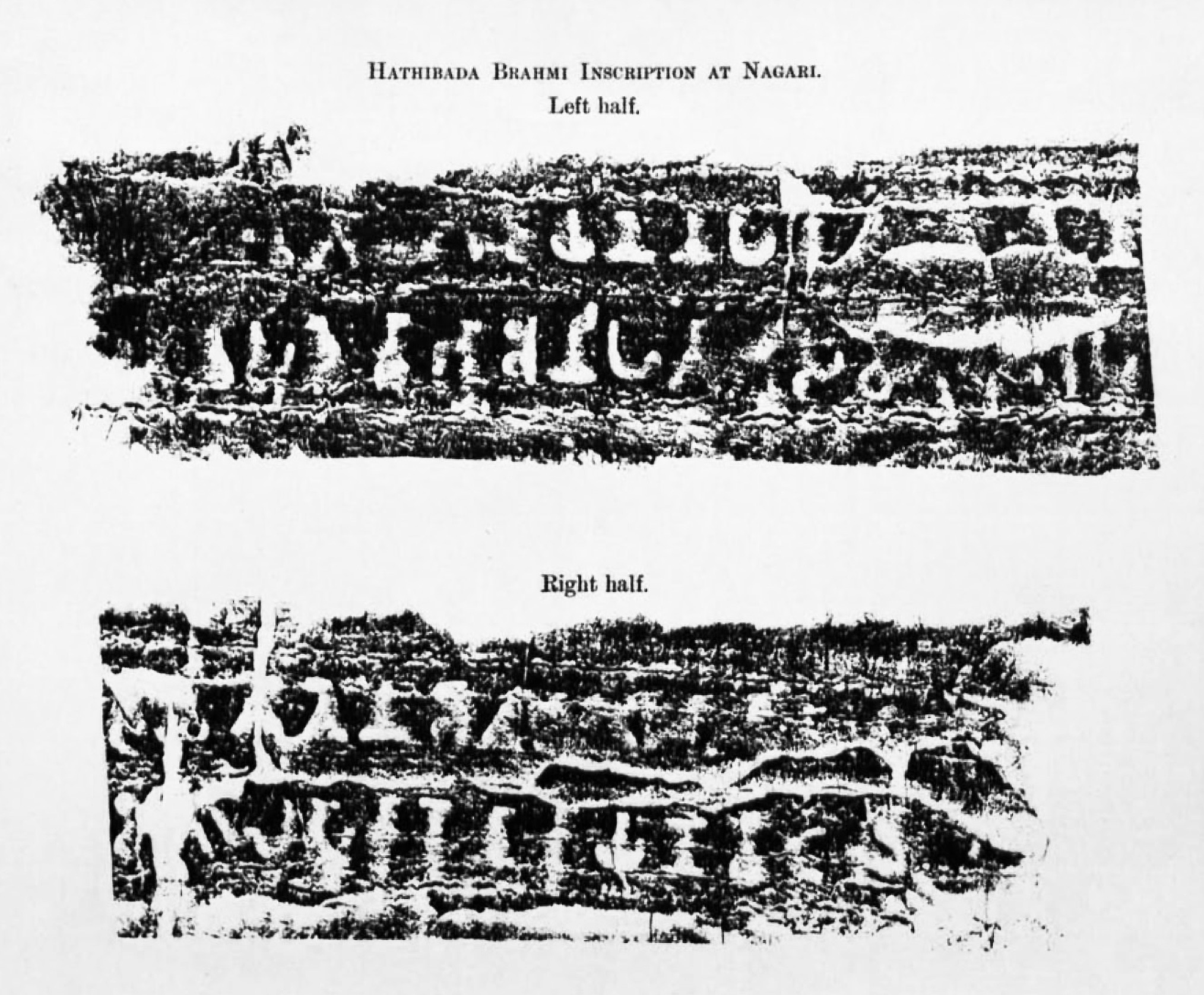
One of the oldest Hindu Sanskrit (Note: Salomon states that the inscription has a few scribal errors, but is essentially standard Sanskrit.) inscriptions, the broken pieces of this early-1st-century BCE Hathibada Brahmi Inscription were discovered in Rajasthan. It is a dedication to deities Vāsudeva-Samkarshana (Krishna-Balarama) and mentions a stone temple.

The Brahmi script for writing Sanskrit is a "modified consonant-syllabic" script. The graphic syllable is its basic unit, and this consists of a consonant with or without diacritic modifications. Since the vowel is an integral part of the consonants, and given the efficiently compacted, fused consonant cluster morphology for Sanskrit words and grammar, the Brahmi and its derivative writing systems deploy ligatures, diacritics and relative positioning of the vowel to inform the reader how the vowel is related to the consonant and how it is expected to be pronounced for clarity. (Note: Salomon illustrates this for the consonant ka which is written as "" in the Brahmi script and "क" in the Devanagari script, the vowel is marked together with the consonant before as in "कि", after "का", above "के" or below "कृ".) This feature of Brahmi and its modern Indic script derivatives makes it difficult to classify it under the main script types used for the writing systems for most of the world's languages, namely logographic, syllabic and alphabetic.

==== Nagari script ====
Many modern era manuscripts are written and available in the Nagari script, whose form is attestable to the 1st millennium CE. The Nagari script is the ancestor of Devanagari (north India), Nandinagari (south India) and other variants. The Nāgarī script was in regular use by 7th century CE, and had fully evolved into the Devanagari and Nandinagari scripts by about the end of the first millennium of the common era. The Devanagari script, states Banerji, became more popular for Sanskrit in India since about the 18th century. However, Sanskrit does have a special historical connection to the Nagari script as attested by the epigraphical evidence.

The Nagari script used for Classical Sanskrit has the fullest repertoire of characters, consisting of fourteen vowels and thirty three consonants. For Vedic Sanskrit, it has two more allophonic consonantal characters (the intervocalic ळ ḷa, and ळ्ह ḷha). To communicate phonetic accuracy, it also includes several modifiers such as the anusvara dot and the visarga double dot, punctuation symbols and others such as the halanta sign.

==== Other writing systems ====
Sanskrit in modern Indian and other Brahmi scripts: May Śiva bless those who take delight in the language of the gods. (Kālidāsa)

Other scripts such as Gujarati, Bangla-Assamese, Odia and major south Indian scripts, states Salomon, "have been and often still are used in their proper territories for writing Sanskrit". These and many Indian scripts look different to the untrained eye, but the differences between Indic scripts is "mostly superficial and they share the same phonetic repertoire and systemic features", states Salomon. They all have essentially the same set of eleven to fourteen vowels and thirty-three consonants as established by the Sanskrit language and attestable in the Brahmi script. Further, a closer examination reveals that they all have the similar basic graphic principles, the same varnamala (literally, "garland of letters") alphabetic ordering following the same logical phonetic order, easing the work of historic skilled scribes writing or reproducing Sanskrit works across South Asia. (Note: Salomon states that these shared graphic principles that combine syllabic and alphabetic writing are distinctive for Indic scripts when contrasted with other major world languages. The only known similarity is found in the Ethiopic scripts, but Ethiopic system lacks clusters and the Indic set of full vowels signs.)

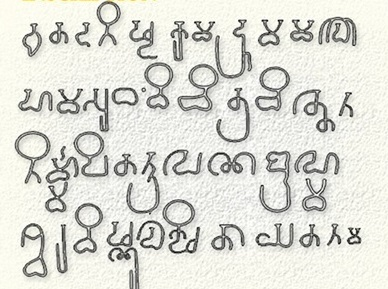
One of the earliest known Sanskrit inscriptions in Tamil Grantha script at a rock-cut Hindu Trimurti temple (Mandakapattu, c. 615 CE)

In the south, where Dravidian languages predominate, scripts used for Sanskrit include the Kannada, Telugu, Malayalam and Grantha alphabets.

=== Transliteration and romanisation schemes ===
Since the late 18th century, Sanskrit has been transliterated using the Latin alphabet. The system most commonly used today is the IAST (International Alphabet of Sanskrit Transliteration), which has been the academic standard since 1888. ASCII-based transliteration schemes have also evolved because of difficulties representing Sanskrit characters in computer systems. These include Harvard-Kyoto and ITRANS, a transliteration scheme that is used widely on the Internet, especially in Usenet and in email, for considerations of speed of entry as well as rendering issues. With the wide availability of Unicode-aware web browsers, IAST has become common online. It is also possible to type using an alphanumeric keyboard and transliterate to Devanagari using software like Mac OS X's international support.

=== Epigraphy ===
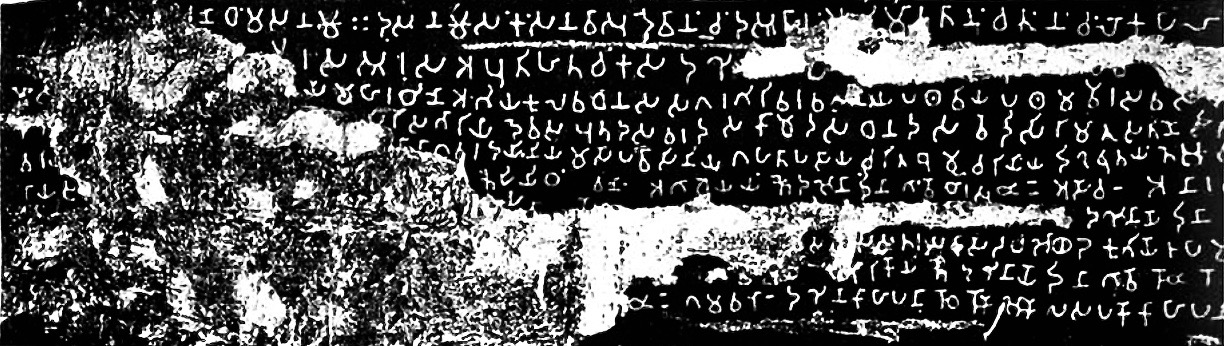
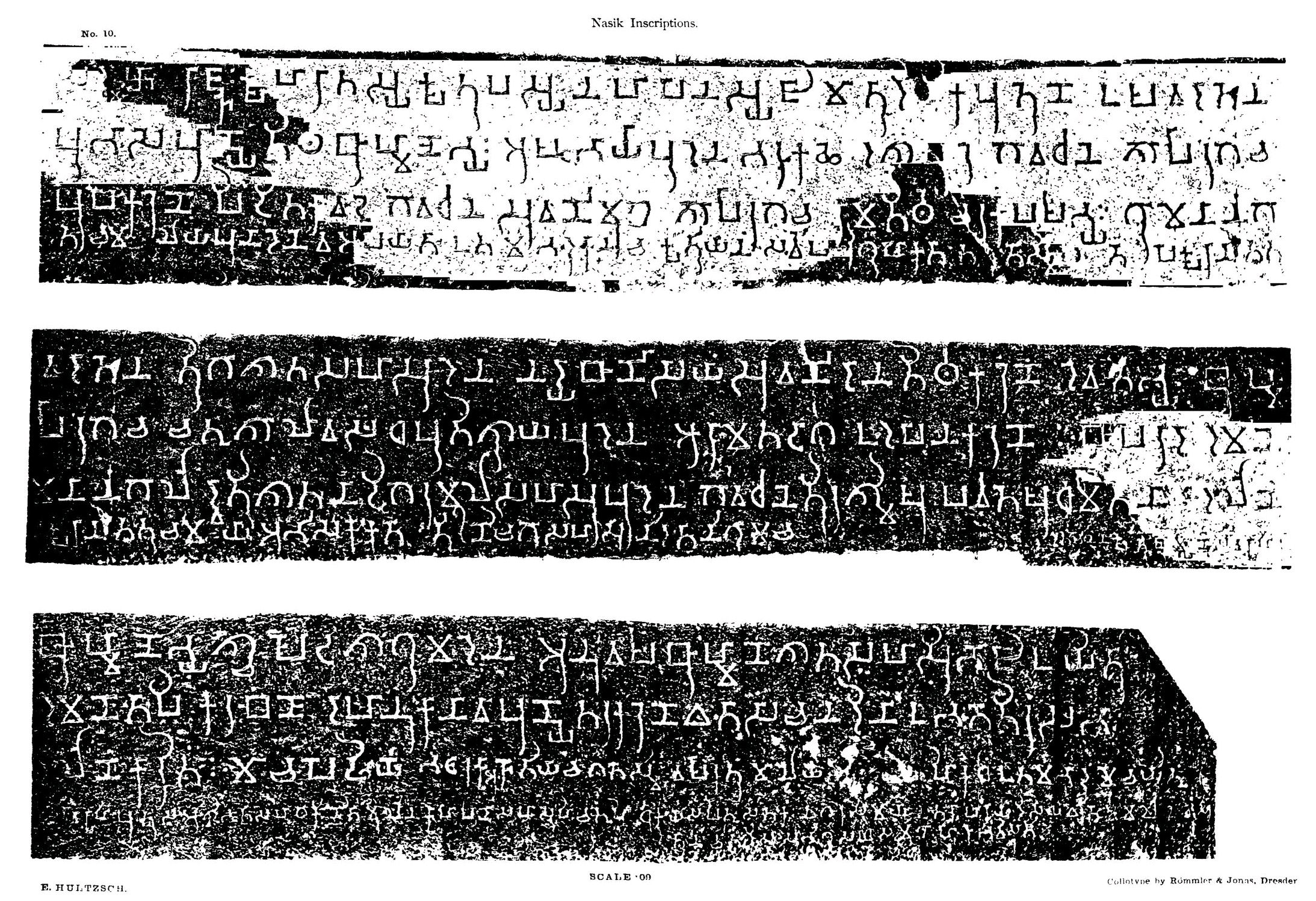
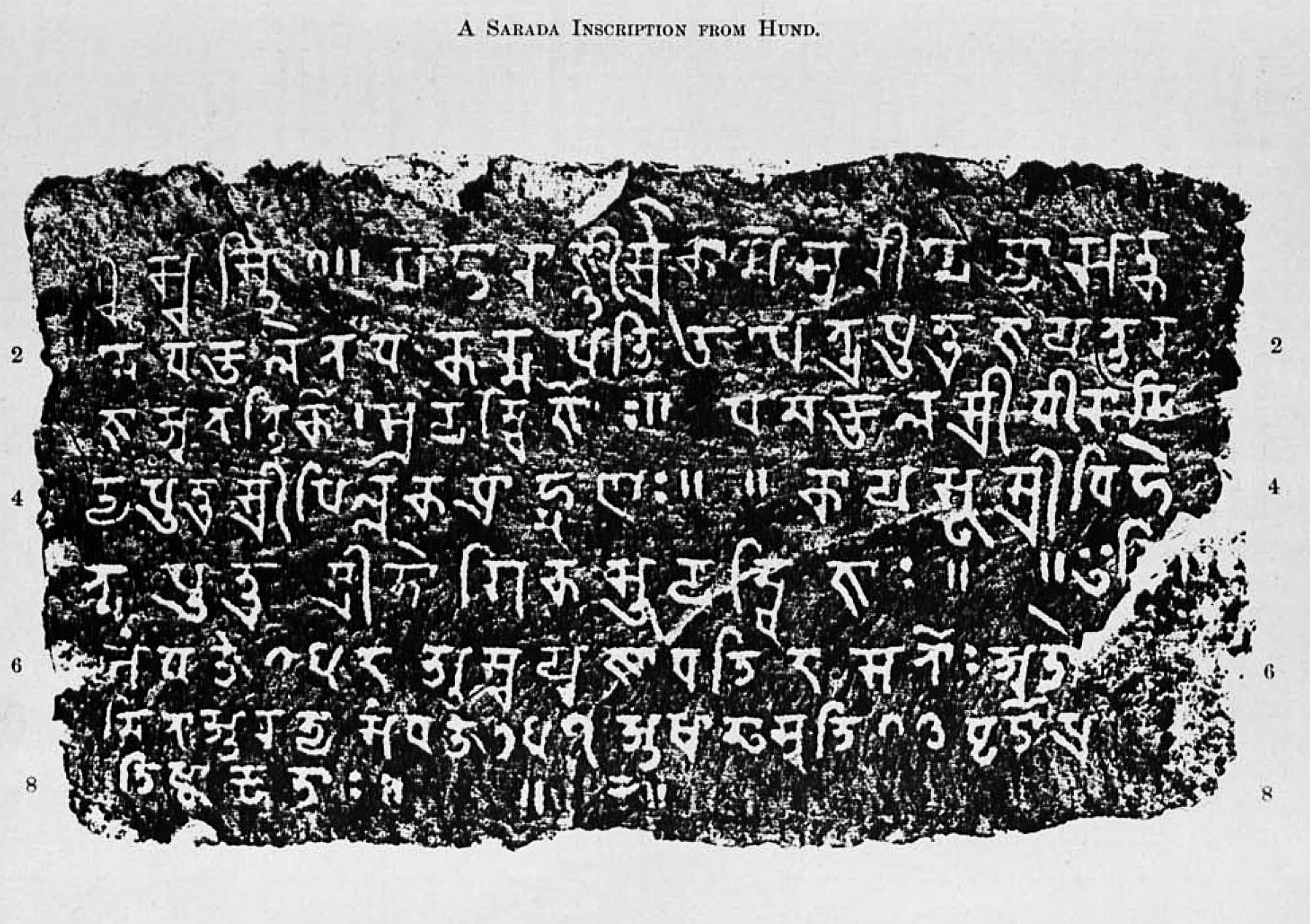
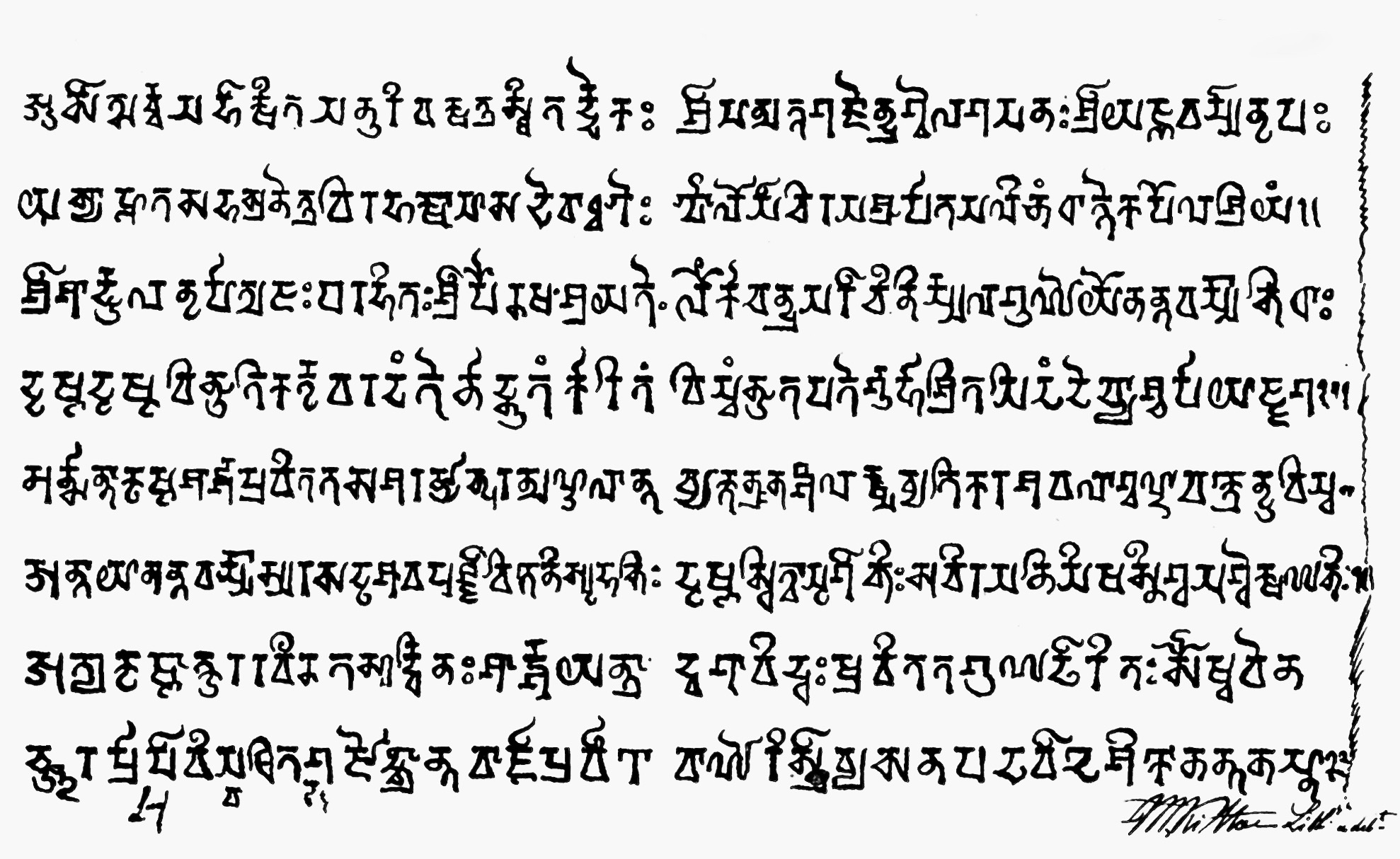
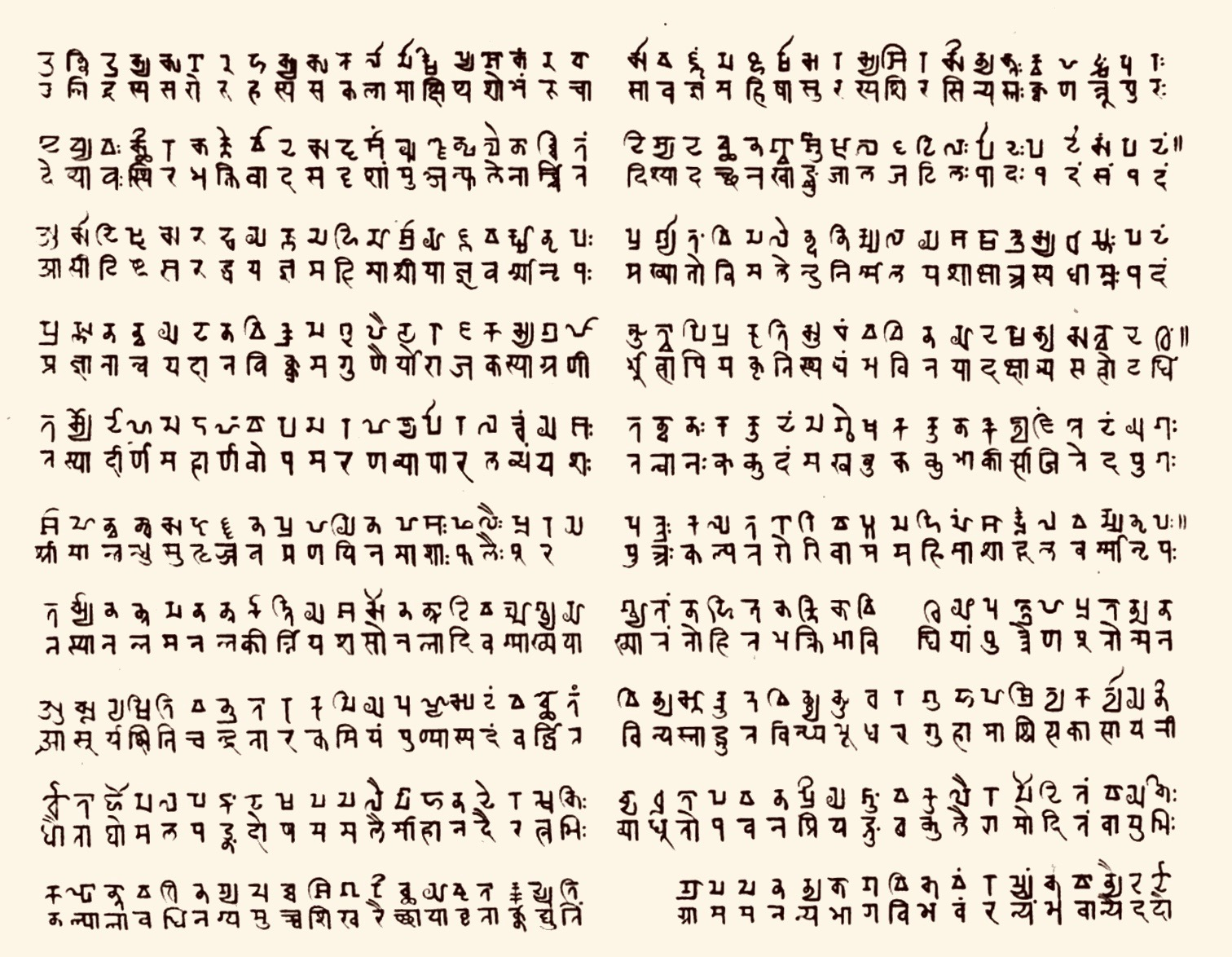
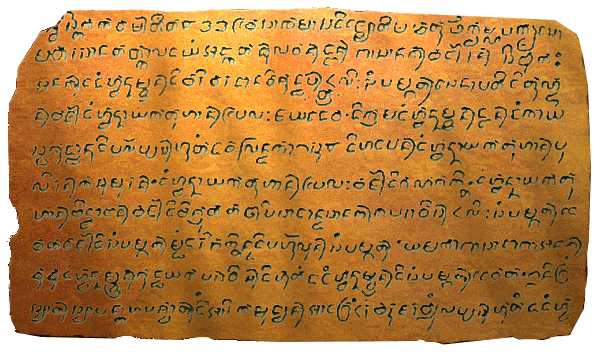
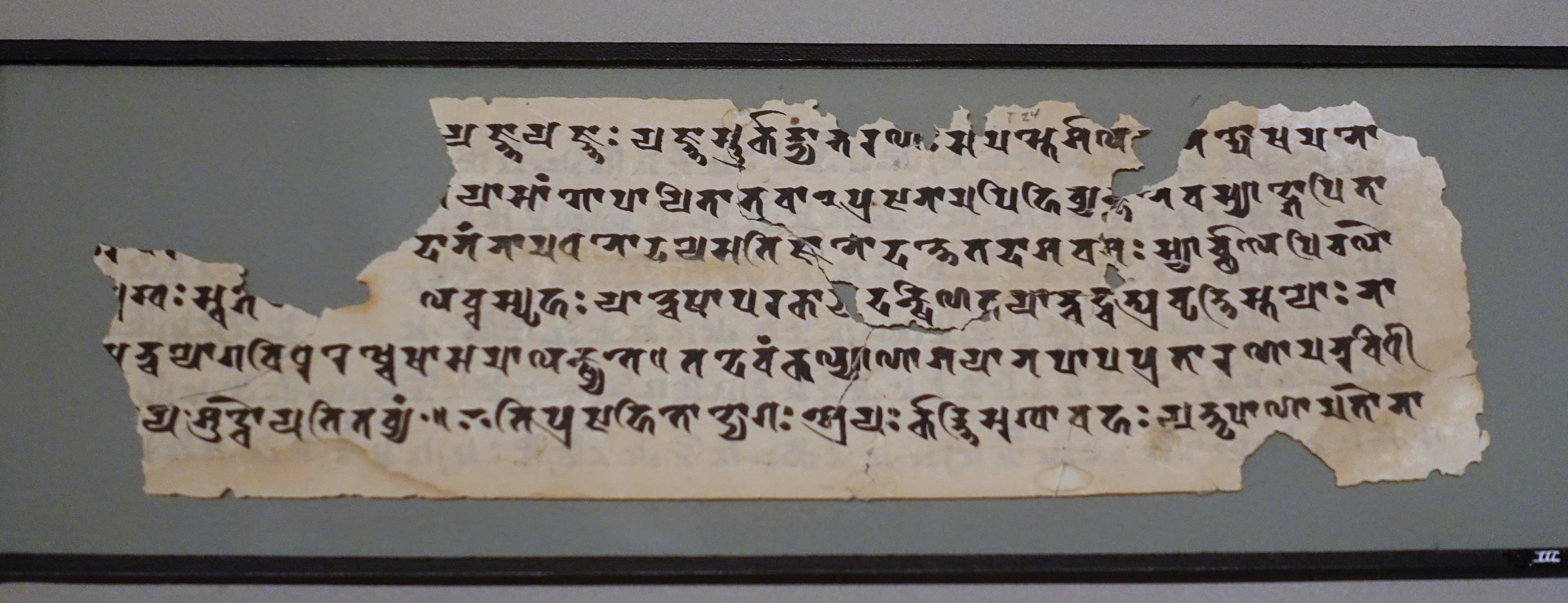
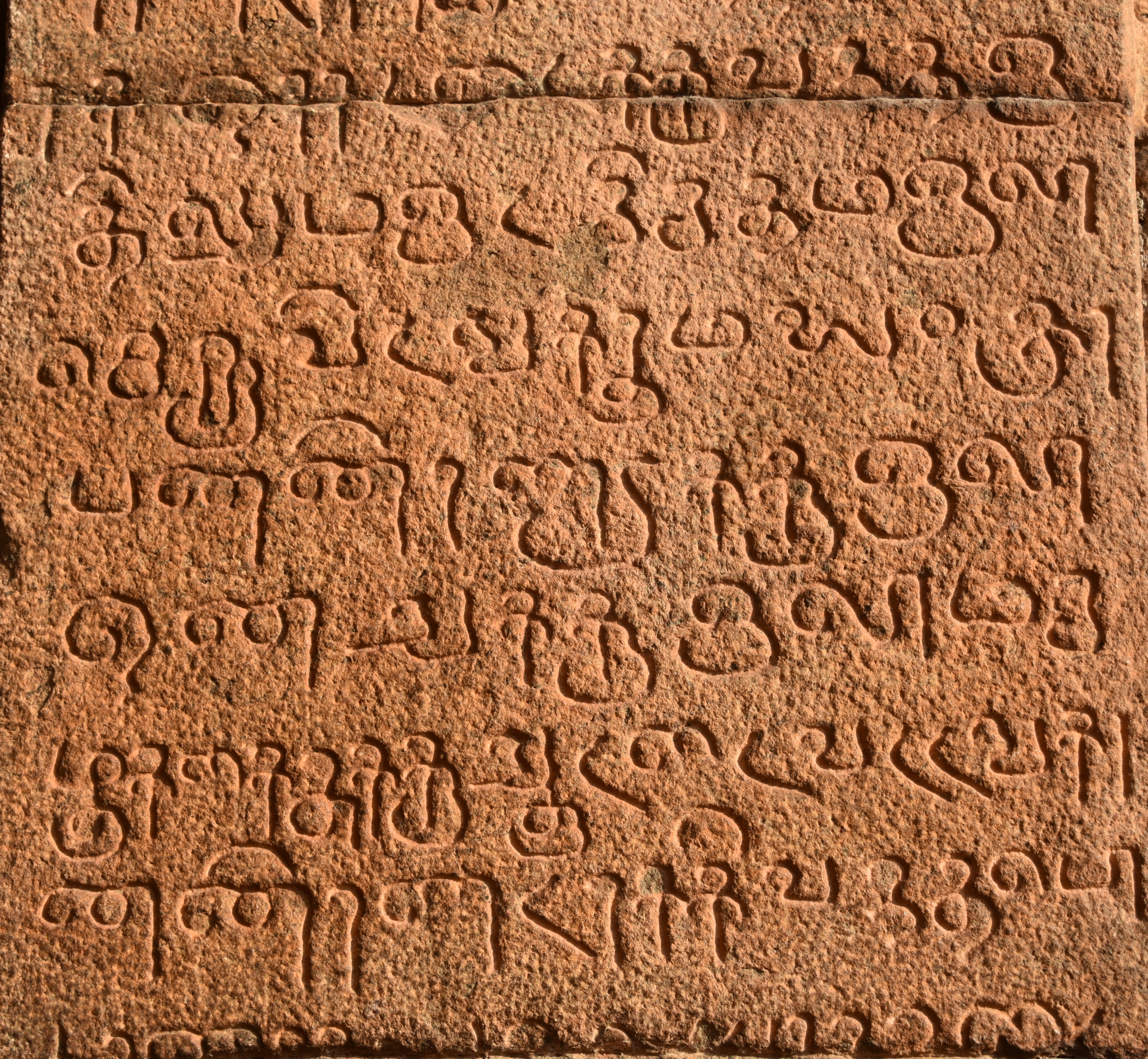
Starting in about the 1st century BCE, Sanskrit has been written in many South Asian, Southeast Asian and Central Asian scripts.

Sanskrit epigraphy, the study of ancient inscriptions in Sanskrit, offers insight into the linguistic, cultural, and historical evolution of South Asia and its neighbors. Early inscriptions, such as those from the 1st century BCE in Ayodhya and Hathibada, are written in Brahmi script and reflect the transition to classical Sanskrit. The Mathura inscriptions from the 1st and 2nd centuries CE, including the Mora Well and Vasu Doorjamb inscriptions, represent significant contributions to the early use of Sanskrit, often linked to Hindu and Jaina traditions.

Sanskrit inscriptions extended beyond South Asia, influencing Southeast Asia from the 4th century CE onward. Indic scripts adapted for Sanskrit were found in regions like Vietnam, Malaysia, Indonesia, and Cambodia, where they evolved into local scripts such as Khmer, Javanese, and Balinese. These inscriptions highlight the spread of Indian cultural and religious practices.

== Literature ==
Literature in Sanskrit (Note: "Since the Renaissance there has been no event of such worldwide significance in the history of culture as the discovery of Sanskrit literature in the latter part of the eighteenth century" – Macdonell) can be broadly divided into texts composed in Vedic Sanskrit and the later Classical Sanskrit. Vedic Sanskrit is the language of the extensive liturgical works of the Vedic religion, (Note: 'The style of the [Vedic] works is more simple and spontaneous while that of the later works abounds in puns, conceits and long compounds. Rhetorical ornaments are more and more copious and complex and the rules of Poetic and Grammar more and more rigidly observed as time advances.' – Iyengar,) which aside from the four Vedas, include the Brāhmaṇas and the Sūtras.

The Vedic literature that survives is entirely of a religious form, whereas works in Classical Sanskrit exist in a wide variety of fields including epics, lyric, drama, romance, fairytale, fables, grammar, civil and religious law, the science of politics and practical life, the science of love and sex, philosophy, medicine, astronomy, astrology and mathematics, and is largely secular in subject-matter.

While Vedic literature is essentially optimistic in spirit, portraying man as strong and powerful capable of finding fulfilment both here and in the afterworld, the later literature is pessimistic, portraying humans as controlled by the forces of fate with worldly pleasures deemed the cause of misery. These fundamental differences in psychology are attributed to the absence of the doctrines of Karma and reincarnation in the Vedic period, notions which are very prevalent in later times.

=== Works ===
Sanskrit has been written in various scripts on a variety of media such as palm leaves, cloth, paper, rock and metal sheets, from ancient times.

Sanskrit literature by tradition
Tradition	Sanskrit texts, genre or collection	Example	References
Hinduism	Scriptures	Vedas, Upaniṣads, Āgamas, the Bhagavad·Gītā	
Hinduism	Language, Grammar	Aṣṭādhyāyī, Gaṇa·pāṭha, Pada·pāṭha, Vārttikas, Mahābhāṣya, Vākya·padīya, Phiṭ·sūtra	
Hinduism	Civil and Religious Law	Dharma·sūtras/Dharma·śāstras, (Note: These are just generic names for works of law) Manu·smṛti	
Hinduism	Statecraft, political science	Artha·śāstra	
Hinduism	Timekeeping, Mathematics, Logic	Kalpa, Jyotiṣa, Gaṇita·śāstra, Śulba·sūtras, Siddhāntas, Āryabhaṭīya, Daśa·gītikā·sutra, Siddhānta·śiromaṇi, Gaṇita·sāra·saṅgraha, Bīja·gaṇita (Note: an account of Indian algebra)	
Hinduism	Life sciences, health	Āyurveda, Suśruta·saṃhitā, Caraka·saṃhitā	
Hinduism	Sex, emotions (Note: Kāma·śāstra, 'the science of love')	Kāma·sūtra, Pañca·sāyaka, Rati·rahasya, Rati·mañjari, Anaṅga·ranga	
Hinduism	Epics	Rāmāyaṇa, Mahābhārata	
Hinduism	Court Epic (Kāvya)	Raghu·vaṃśa, Kumāra·sambhava	
Hinduism	Gnomic and didactic literature	Subhāṣitas, Nīti·śataka, Bodhicary'âvatāra, Śṛṅgāra·jñāna·nirṇaya, Kalā·vilāsa, Catur·varga·saṅgraha, Nīti·mañjari, Mugdh'ôpadeśa, Subhāṣita·ratna·sandoha, Yoga·śāstra, Śṛṅgāra·vairāgya·taraṅgiṇī	
Hinduism	Drama, dance and the performance arts	Nāṭya·śāstra	
Hinduism	Music	Sangīta·śāstra	
Hinduism	Poetics	Kāvya·śāstra	
Hinduism	Mythology	Purāṇas	
Hinduism	Mystical speculations, philosophy	Darśana, Sāṅkhya, Yoga (philosophy), Nyāya, Vaiśeṣika, Mīmāṅsa, Vedānta, Vaishnavism, Shaivism, Shaktism, Smārta Tradition and others	
Hinduism	Agriculture and food	Kṛṣi·śāstra	
Hinduism	Design, architecture (Vastu, Śilpa)	Śilpa·śāstra	
Hinduism	Temples, Sculpture	Bṛhat·saṃhitā	
Hinduism	Saṃskāra (rites-of-passage)	Gṛhya·sūtras	
Buddhism	Sutras, Vinaya, Kāvya, Medicine, Buddhist philosophy	Tripiṭaka, (Note: Most Tripiṭaka historic texts in the Pali language, but Sanskrit Tripiṭaka texts have been discovered.) Mahayana sutras and shastras, tantras, grammar texts, Buddhist poetry, drama, Buddhist medical texts	
Jainism	Theology, philosophy	Tattvārtha Sūtra, Mahāpurāṇa and others	

== Lexicon ==
As an Indo-European language, Sanskrit's core lexicon is inherited from Proto-Indo-European. Over time however, the language exhibits a tendency to shed many of these inherited words and borrow others in their place from other sources.

In the oldest Vedic literature, there are few such non-Indo-European words, but these progressively grow in volume.

The following are some of the old Indo-European words that eventually faded out of use in Sanskrit:

ápas	work	cf. Latin opus
kravís	raw flesh	cf. Latin crūdus
dáma-	house	cf. Latin domus
dā́nu-	moisture
háras-	heat

=== Dravidian lexical influence ===
The sources of these new loanwords are many, and vary across the different regions of the Indian subcontinent. But of all influences on the lexicon of Sanskrit, the most important is Dravidian.

The following is a list of Dravidian entrants into Sanskrit lexicon, although some may have been contested:

phálam	ripe fruit	Proto-Dravidian *paẓam
múkham	mouth	Proto-Dravidian *mukam
kajjala-	soot, lampblack
kaṭu-	sharp, pungent
kaṭhina-	hard, firm
kuṭi-	hut, house
kuṭṭ-	to pound
kuṇḍala-	loop, ring, earring, coil of rope
khala-	a rogue
mayū́ra-	peacock
mallikā	jasmine
mīna-	fish
vallī-	creeper
heramba-	buffalo

=== Nominal-form preference ===
While Vedic and epic form of speech is largely cognate to that of other Indo-European languages such as Greek and Latin, later Sanskrit shows a tendency to move away from using verbal forms to nominal ones. Examples of nominal forms taking the place of conventional conjugation are:

past passive participle
active past participle in -vant
naraḥ gataḥ
kṛtavān
"the man went",
(lit. 'The man was gone')
"he had done"

(lit. 'He, having done, (is)')

However the most notable development is the prolific use of word-compounding to express ideas normally conveyed by verbal forms and sub-clauses introduced by conjunctions.

Classical Sanskrit's pre-eminent playwright Kālidāsa uses:

vīcikṣobhastanitavihagaśreṇikāñcīguṇā	whose girdle-string is a row of birds, loquacious through the agitation of the waves

== Influence on other languages ==
For nearly 2,000 years, Sanskrit was the language of a cultural order that exerted influence across South Asia, Inner Asia, Southeast Asia, and to a certain extent East Asia. A significant form of post-Vedic Sanskrit is found in the Sanskrit of Indian epic poetry—the Ramayana and Mahabharata. The deviations from Pāṇini in the epics are generally considered to be on account of interference from Prakrits, or innovations, and not because they are pre-Paninian. Traditional Sanskrit scholars call such deviations ārṣa (आर्ष), meaning 'of the ṛṣis', the traditional title for the ancient authors. In some contexts, there are also more "prakritisms" (borrowings from common speech) than in Classical Sanskrit proper. Buddhist Hybrid Sanskrit is a literary language heavily influenced by the Middle Indo-Aryan languages, based on early Buddhist Prakrit texts which subsequently assimilated to the Classical Sanskrit standard in varying degrees.

=== Indian subcontinent ===
Sanskrit has greatly influenced the languages of India that grew from its vocabulary and grammatical base; for instance, Hindi is a "Sanskritised register" of Hindustani. All modern Indo-Aryan languages, as well as Munda and Dravidian languages have borrowed many words either directly from Sanskrit (tatsama words), or indirectly via middle Indo-Aryan languages (tadbhava words). Words originating in Sanskrit are estimated at fifty percent of the vocabulary of modern Indo-Aryan languages, as well as the literary forms of Malayalam and Kannada. Literary texts in Telugu are lexically Sanskrit or Sanskritised to an enormous extent, perhaps seventy percent or more. Marathi is another prominent language in Western India, that derives most of its words and Marathi grammar from Sanskrit. Sanskrit words are often preferred in the literary texts in Marathi over corresponding colloquial Marathi word.

There has been a profound influence of Sanskrit on the lexical and grammatical systems of Dravidian languages. As per Dalby, India has been a single cultural area for about two millennia which has helped Sanskrit influence on all the Indic languages. Emeneau and Burrow mention the tendency "for all four of the Dravidian literary languages in South to make literary use of total Sanskrit lexicon indiscriminately". There are a large number of loanwords found in the vocabulary of the three major Dravidian languages Malayalam, Kannada and Telugu. Tamil also has significant loanwords from Sanskrit. Krishnamurthi mentions that although it is not clear when the Sanskrit influence happened on the Dravidian languages, it might have been around the 5th century BCE at the time of separation of Tamil and Kannada from a common ancestral stage. ‌The borrowed words are classified into two types based on phonological integration – tadbhava – those words derived from Prakrit and tatsama – unassimilated loanwords from Sanskrit.

Strazny mentions that "so massive has been the influence that it is hard to utter Sanskrit words have influenced Kannada from the early times". The first document in Kannada, the Halmidi inscription has a large number of Sanskrit words. As per Kachru, the influence has not only been on single lexical items in Kannada but also on "long nominal compounds and complicated syntactic expressions". New words have been created in Kannada using Sanskrit derivational prefixes and suffixes like vikēndrīkaraṇa, anilīkaraṇa, bahīskruṭa. Similar stratification is found in verb morphology. Sanskrit words readily undergo verbalisation in Kannada, verbalising suffixes as in: chāpisu, dauḍāyisu, ravānisu.

George mentions that "No other Dravidian language has been so deeply influenced by Sanskrit as Malayalam". According to Lambert, Malayalam is so immensely Sanskritised that every Sanskrit word can be used in Malayalam by integrating "prosodic phonological" changes as per Grant. Loanwords have been integrated into Malayalam by "prosodic phonological" changes as per Grant. These phonological changes are either by replacement of a vowel as in sant-am coming from Sanskrit santa, sāgar-am from sāgara, or addition of prothetic vowel as in aracan from rājā-, uruvam from rūpa, codyam from sodhya.

Hans Henrich et al. note that, the language of the pre-modern Telugu literature was also highly influenced by Sanskrit and was standardised between 11th and 14th centuries. Aiyar has shown that in a class of tadbhavas in Telugu the first and second letters are often replaced by the third and fourth letters and fourth again replaced often by h. Examples of the same are: Sanskrit artha becomes ardhama, vīthi becomes vidhi, putra becomes bidda, mukham becomes muhamu.

Tamil also has been influenced by Sanskrit. Hans Henrich et al. mention that propagation of Jainism and Buddhism into south India had its influence. Shulman mentions that although contrary to the views held by Tamil purists, modern Tamil has been significantly influenced from Sanskrit, further states that "Indeed, there may well be more Sanskrit in Tamil than in the Sanskrit derived north-Indian vernaculars". Sanskrit words have been Tamilized through the "Tamil phonematic grid".

=== Beyond the Indian subcontinent ===
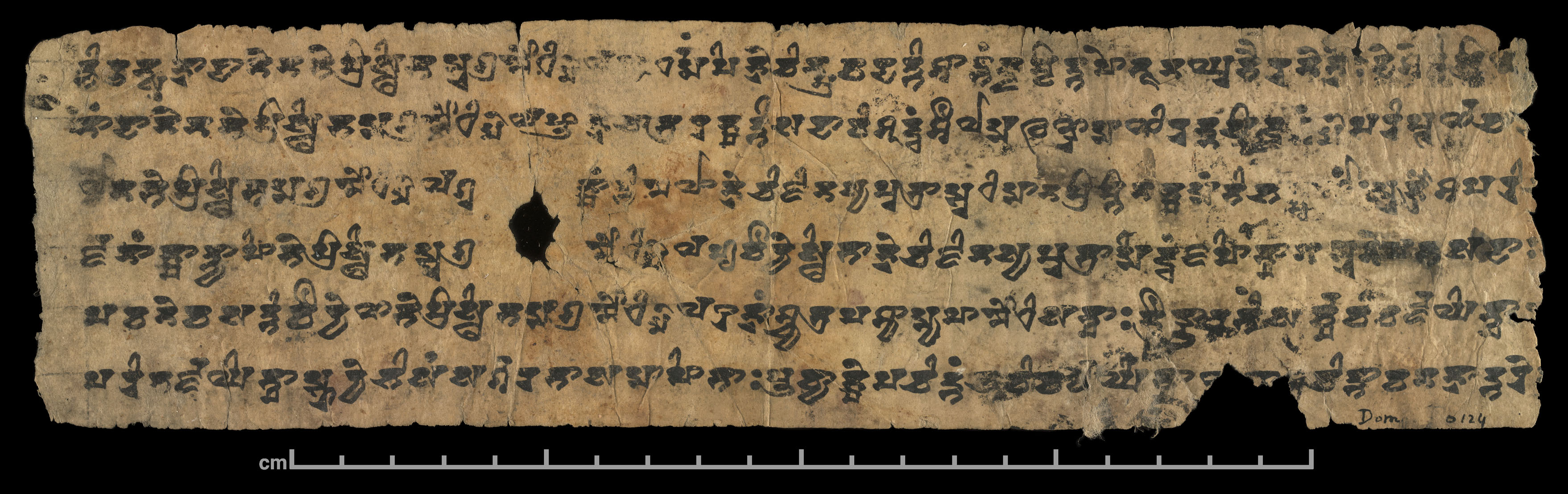
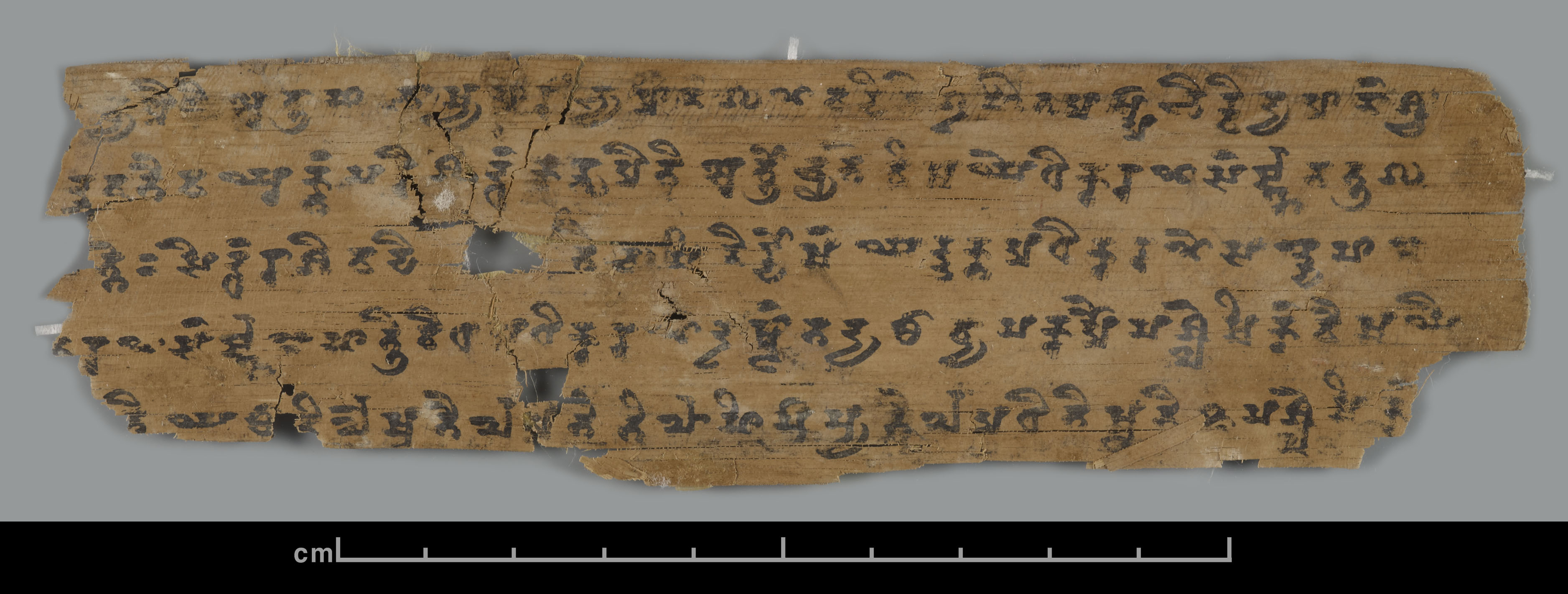
Sanskrit has had a historical presence and influence in many parts of Asia. Above (top clockwise): [i] a Sanskrit manuscript from Turkestan, [ii] another from Miran-China.

Sanskrit was a language for religious purposes and for the political elite in parts of medieval era Southeast Asia, Central Asia and East Asia, having been introduced in these regions mainly along with the spread of Buddhism. In some cases, it has competed with Pāli for prominence.

==== East Asia ====
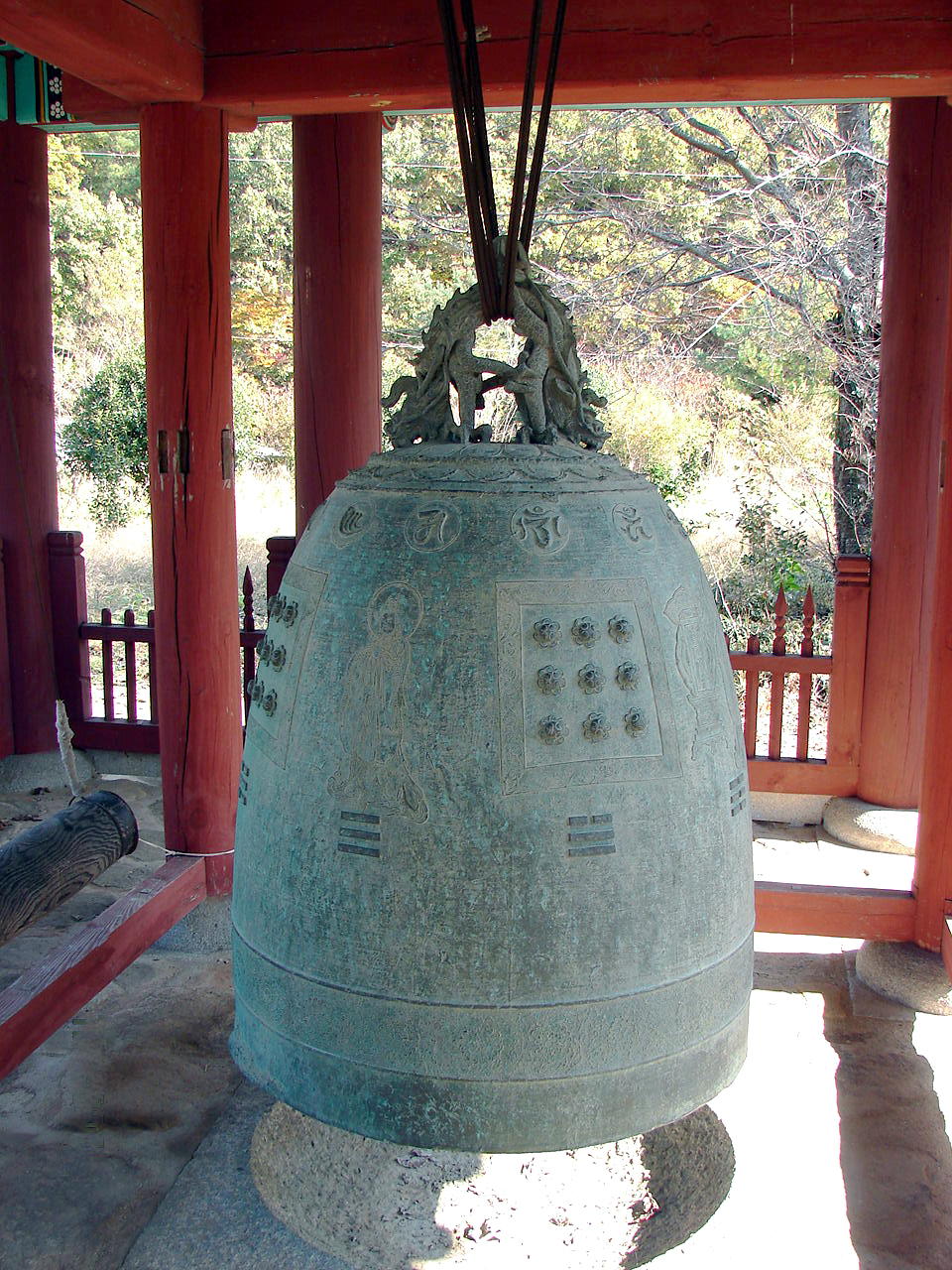
[i] a bell with Sanskrit engravings in South Korea [ii] the Kūkai calligraphy of Siddham-Sanskrit in Japan

Buddhist Sanskrit has had a considerable influence on Sino-Tibetan languages such as Chinese, state William Wang and Chaofen Sun. Many words have been adopted from Sanskrit into Chinese, both in its historic religious discourse and everyday use. (Note: Examples of phonetically imported Sanskrit words in Chinese include samgha (Chinese: seng), bhiksuni (ni), kasaya (jiasha), namo or namas (namo), and nirvana (niepan). The list of phonetically transcribed and semantically translated words from Sanskrit into Chinese is substantial, states Xiangdong Shi.) This process likely started about 200 CE and continued through about 1400 CE, with the efforts of monks such as Yuezhi, Anxi, Kangju, Tianzhu, Yan Fodiao, Faxian, Xuanzang and Yijing.

Further, as the Chinese languages and culture influenced the rest of East Asia, the ideas in Sanskrit texts and some of its linguistic elements migrated further.

Many terms were transliterated directly and added to the Chinese vocabulary. Chinese words like 剎那 chànà (Devanagari: क्षण kṣaṇa 'instantaneous period') were borrowed from Sanskrit. Many Sanskrit texts survive only in Tibetan collections of commentaries to the Buddhist teachings, the Tengyur.

Sanskrit has also influenced the religious register of Japanese mostly through transliterations. These were borrowed from Chinese transliterations. In particular, the Shingon (lit. 'True Words') sect of esoteric Buddhism has been relying on Sanskrit and original Sanskrit mantras and writings, as a means of realising Buddhahood.

==== Southeast Asia ====
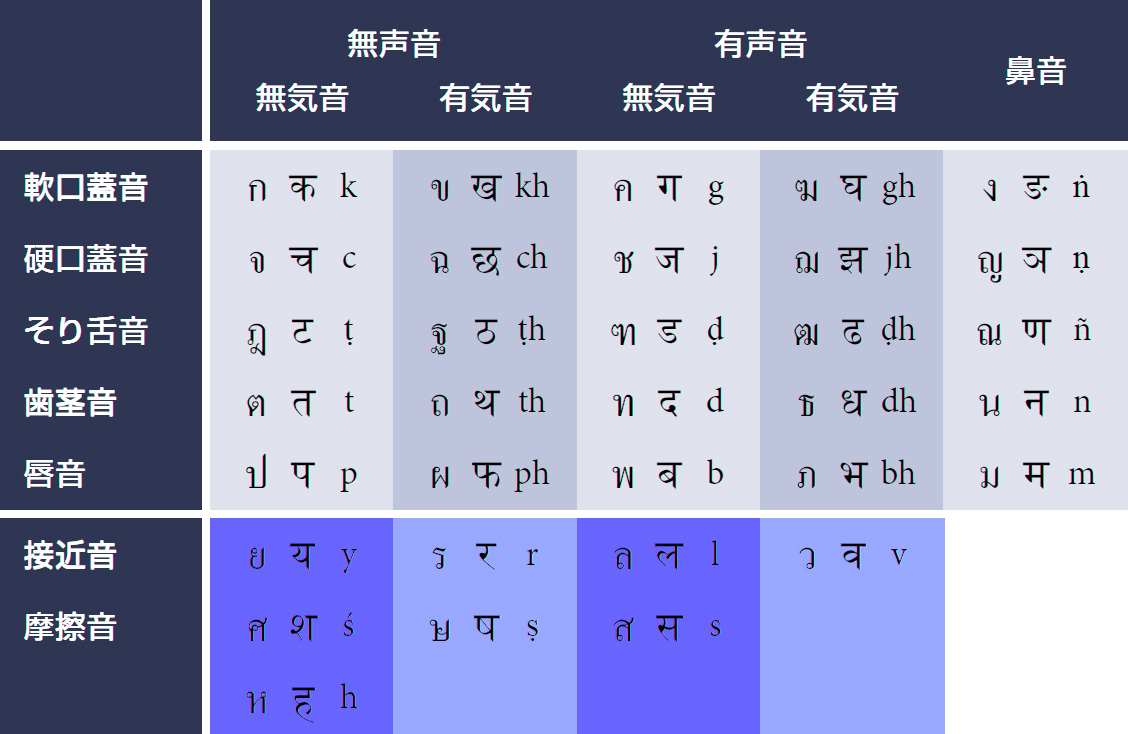
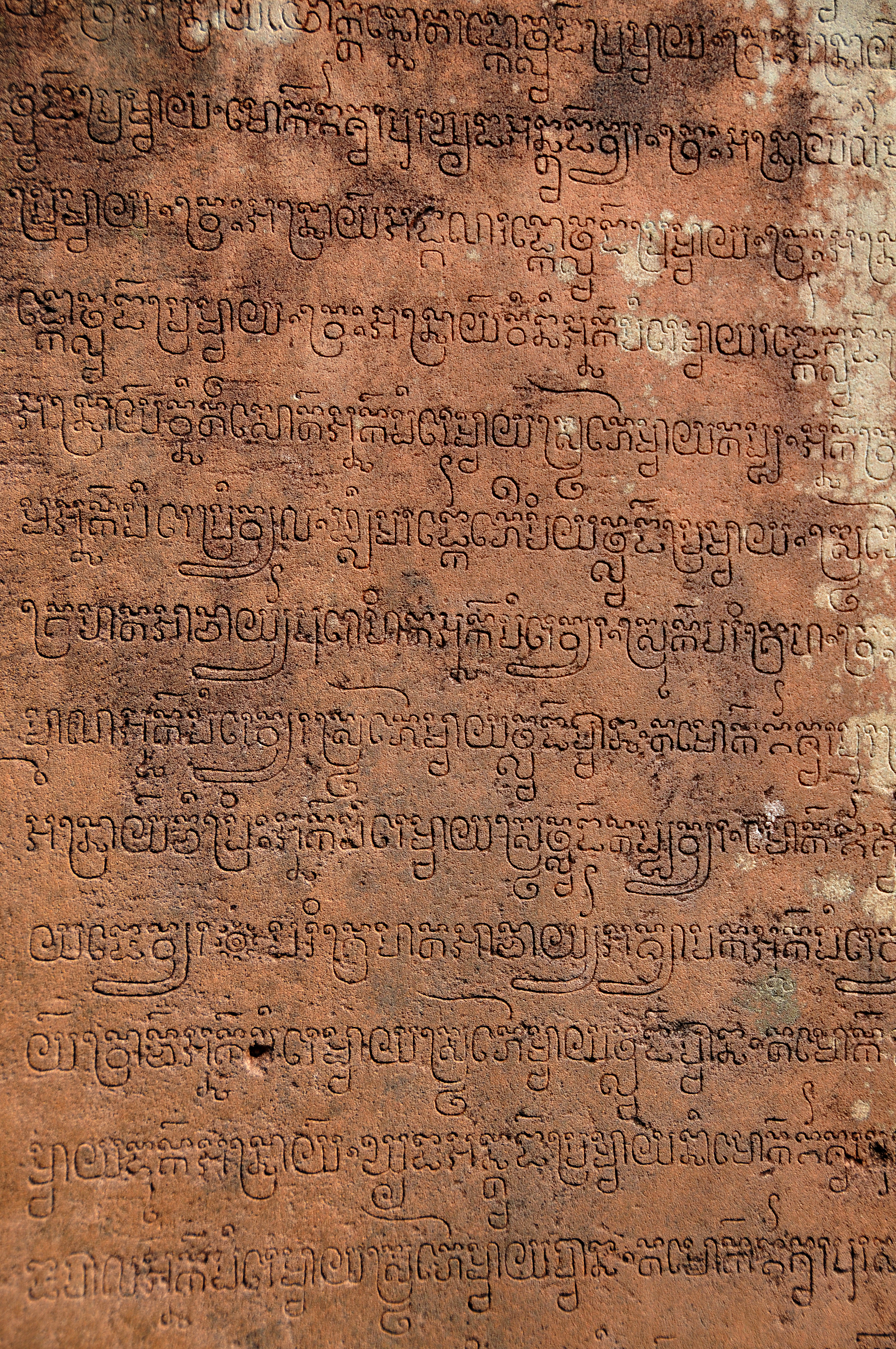
[i] the Thai script [ii] a Sanskrit inscription in Cambodia

A large number of inscriptions in Sanskrit across Southeast Asia testify the influence the language held in these regions.

Languages such as Indonesian, Thai and Lao contain many loanwords from Sanskrit, as does Khmer. Many Sanskrit loanwords are also found in Austronesian languages, such as Javanese, particularly the older form in which nearly half the vocabulary is borrowed.

Other Austronesian languages, such as Malay (descended into modern Malaysian and Indonesian standards) also derive much of their vocabulary from Sanskrit. Similarly, Philippine languages such as Tagalog have some Sanskrit loanwords.

A Sanskrit loanword encountered in many Southeast Asian languages is the word bhāṣā, or spoken language, which is used to refer to the names of many languages.

To this day, Southeast Asian languages such as Thai are known to draw upon Sanskrit for technical vocabulary.

===== Indonesia =====
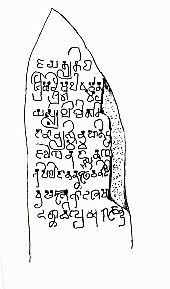
The ancient Yūpa inscription (one of the earliest and oldest Sanskrit texts written in ancient Indonesia) dating back to the 4th century CE written by Brahmins under the rule of King Mulavarman of the Kutai Martadipura Kingdom located in eastern Borneo

The earliest Sanskrit text which was founded in the Indonesian Archipelago was at Eastern Borneo dating back to 400 CE known as the Mulavarman inscription. This is one of the reason of strong influence of Indian culture that entered the Malay Archipelago during the Indianization era, and since then, Indian culture has been absorbed towards Indonesian culture and language. Thus, the Sanskrit culture in Indonesia exists not as a religious aspect but more towards a cultural aspect that has been present for generations, resulting in a more cultural rather than Hinduistic value of the Indonesian people. As a result, it is common to find Muslim or Christian Indonesians with names that have Indian or Sanskrit nuances. Unlike names derived from Sanskrit in Thai and Khmer, the pronunciation of Sanskrit names in Indonesia is more similar to the original Indian pronunciation, except that "v" is changed to "w", for example, "Vishnu" in India will be spelled "Wisnu" in Indonesia.

==== Rest of the world ====
In ancient and medieval times, several Sanskrit words in the field of food and spices made their way into European languages including Greek, Latin and later English. Some of these are pepper, ginger and sugar. English today has several words of Sanskrit origin, most of them borrowed during the British Raj or later. Some of these words have in turn been borrowed by other European or world languages.

== Modern era ==
=== Liturgy, ceremonies and meditation ===
Sanskrit is the sacred language of various Hindu, Buddhist, and Jain traditions. It is used during worship in Hindu temples. In Newar Buddhism, it is used in all monasteries. Sanskrit mantras and Sanskrit as a ritual language were commonplace among Jains throughout their medieval history.

Many Hindu rituals and rites-of-passage such as the "giving away the bride" and mutual vows at weddings, a baby's naming or first solid food ceremony and the goodbye during a cremation invoke and chant Sanskrit hymns. Major festivals such as the Durga Puja ritually recite entire Sanskrit texts such as the Devi Mahatmya every year particularly among the numerous communities of eastern India. In the south, Sanskrit texts are recited at many major Hindu temples such as the Meenakshi Temple. In India and beyond, recitations of the Bhagavad Gita occur in diverse settings, including "simple private household readings, to family and neighborhood recitation sessions, to holy men reciting in temples or at pilgrimage places for passersby, to public Gita discourses held almost nightly at halls and auditoriums in every Indian city".

=== Literature and arts ===
More than 3,000 Sanskrit works have been composed since India's independence in 1947. Much of this work has been judged of high quality, in comparison to both classical Sanskrit literature and modern literature in other Indian languages. In 2009, Satya Vrat Shastri became the first Sanskrit author to win the Jnanpith Award, India's highest literary award.

Sanskrit is used extensively in the Carnatic and Hindustani branches of classical music. Kirtanas, bhajans, stotras, and shlokas of Sanskrit are popular throughout India. The Samaveda uses musical notations in several of its recessions.

In Mainland China, musicians such as Sa Dingding have written pop songs in Sanskrit.

Numerous loan Sanskrit words are found in other major Asian languages. For example, Filipino, Cebuano, Lao, Khmer, Thai and its alphabets, Malay (including Malaysian and Indonesian), Javanese (old Javanese-English dictionary by P.J. Zoetmulder contains over 25,500 entries), and even in English.

=== Media ===
Since 1974, there has been a short daily news broadcast on All India Radio. These broadcasts are also made available on the internet on AIR's website. Sanskrit news is broadcast on TV and on the internet through the DD National channel. Over 90 weeklies, fortnightlies and quarterlies are published in Sanskrit. Sudharma, a daily printed newspaper in Sanskrit, has been published out of Mysore, India, since 1970. It was started by K.N. Varadaraja Iyengar, a Sanskrit scholar from Mysore.

=== Schools and contemporary status ===
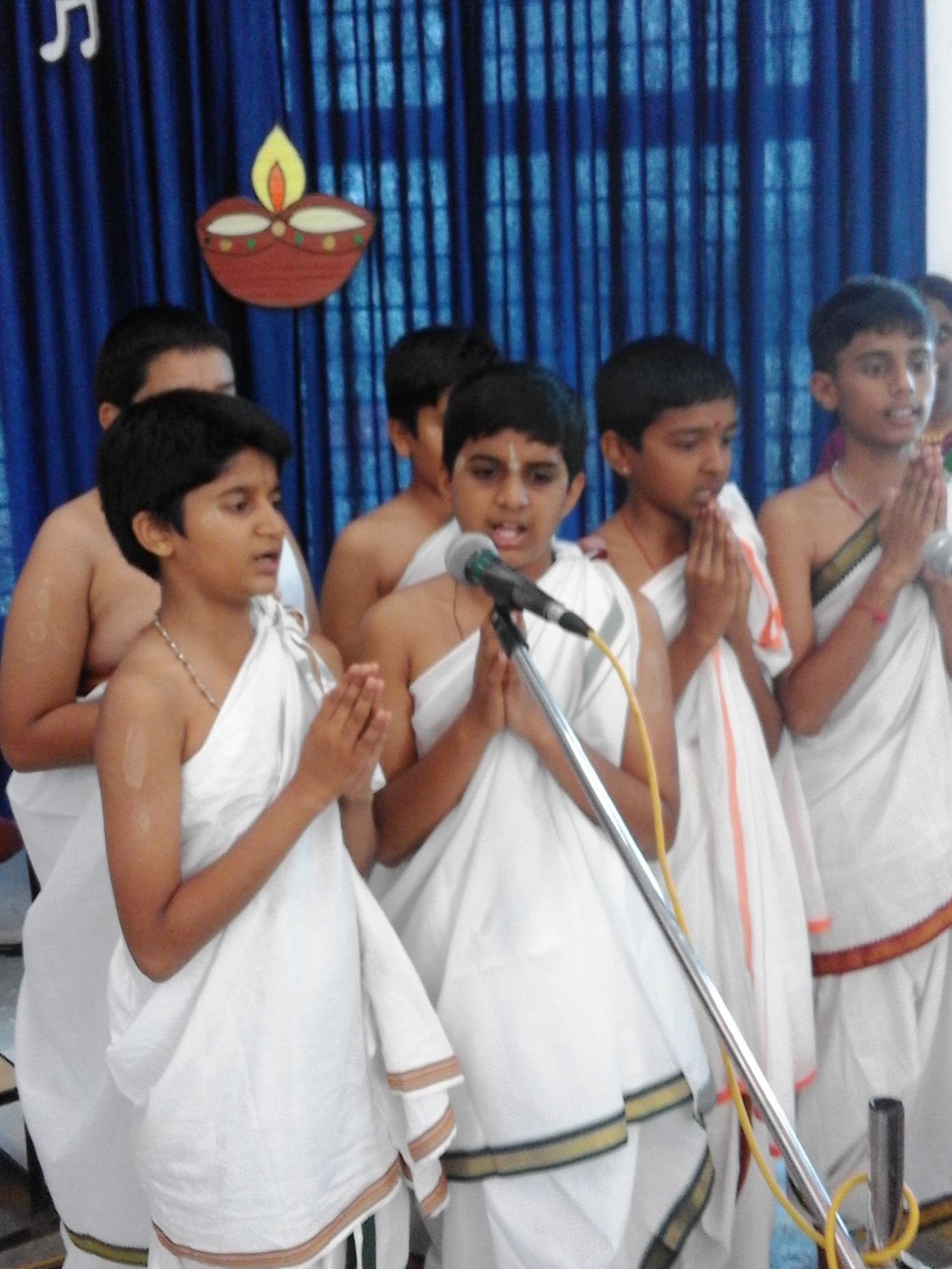
Sanskrit festival at Pramati Hillview Academy, Mysore, India

Sanskrit has been taught in schools from time immemorial in India. In modern times, the first Sanskrit University was Sampurnanand Sanskrit University, established in 1791 in the Indian city of Varanasi. Sanskrit is taught in 5,000 traditional schools (Pathashalas), and 14,000 schools in India. Sanskrit is one of the 22 scheduled languages of India. Despite it being a studied school subject in contemporary India, Sanskrit has not been spoken as a native language in centuries.

In India, Sanskrit is offered as a language in central and several state education board schools and is also taught in traditional gurukulas across the country. A number of colleges and universities in India have dedicated departments for Sanskrit studies. In March 2020, the Indian Parliament passed the Central Sanskrit Universities Act, 2020 which upgraded three universities, National Sanskrit University, Central Sanskrit University and Shri Lal Bahadur Shastri National Sanskrit University, from the deemed to be university status to a central university status.

Dmitri Mendeleev used the Sanskrit numbers of one, two and three (eka-, dvi- or dwi-, and tri- respectively) to give provisional names to his predicted elements, like eka-boron being Gallium or eka-Francium being Ununennium.

In the province of Bali in Indonesia, a number of educational and scholarly institutions have also been conducting Sanskrit lessons for Hindu locals.

==== In the West ====
St James Junior School and Avanti Schools Trust in London, England, offer Sanskrit as part of the curriculum. Since September 2009, US high school students have been able to receive credits as Independent Study or toward Foreign Language requirements by studying Sanskrit as part of the "SAFL: Samskritam as a Foreign Language" programme coordinated by Samskrita Bharati. In Australia, the private boys' high school Sydney Grammar School offers Sanskrit from years 7 through to 12, including for the Higher School Certificate. Other schools that offer Sanskrit include the Ficino School in Auckland, New Zealand; St James Preparatory Schools in Cape Town, Durban and Johannesburg, South Africa; John Colet School, Sydney, Australia; Erasmus School, Melbourne, Australia.

=== European studies and discourse ===
While European scholarship in Sanskrit, begun by Heinrich Roth (1620–1668) and Johann Ernst Hanxleden (1681–1731), is considered responsible for the discovery of an Indo-European language family by Sir William Jones (1746–1794) (with this research playing an important role in the development of Western philology, or historical linguistics), the first scholar to suggest this was the Delhi-based Mughal Empire scholar Siraj-ud-Din Ali Khan Arzu (1687-1756) in his Persian-language philological treatise Muzmir ("Fruitful").

The 18th- and 19th-century speculations about the possible links of Sanskrit to ancient Egyptian language were later proven to be wrong, but it fed an orientalist discourse both in the form Indophobia and Indophilia, states Trautmann. Sanskrit writings, when first discovered, were imagined by Indophiles to potentially be "repositories of the primitive experiences and religion of the human race, and as such confirmatory of the truth of Christian scripture", as well as a key to "universal ethnological narrative". The Indophobes imagined the opposite, making the counterclaim that there is little of any value in Sanskrit, portraying it as "a language fabricated by artful [Brahmin] priests", with little original thought, possibly copied from the Greeks who came with Alexander or perhaps the Persians.

Scholars such as William Jones and his colleagues felt the need for systematic studies of Sanskrit language and literature. This launched the Asiatic Society, an idea that was soon transplanted to Europe starting with the efforts of Henry Thomas Colebrooke in Britain, then Alexander Hamilton who helped expand its studies to Paris and thereafter his student Friedrich Schlegel who introduced Sanskrit to the universities of Germany. Schlegel nurtured his own students into influential European Sanskrit scholars, particularly through Franz Bopp and Friedrich Max Müller. As these scholars translated the Sanskrit manuscripts, the enthusiasm for Sanskrit grew rapidly among European scholars, states Trautmann, and chairs for Sanskrit "were established in the universities of nearly every German statelet" creating a competition for Sanskrit experts.

=== Symbolic usage ===
In India, Indonesia, Nepal, Bangladesh, Sri Lanka, and Southeast Asia, Sanskrit phrases are widely used as mottoes for various national, educational and social organisations:

- India: Satyameva Jayate (सत्यमेव जयते), meaning 'truth alone triumphs'.
- Nepal: Janani Janmabhūmischa Swargādapi Garīyasī (जननी जन्मभूमिश्च स्वर्गादपि गरीयसी), meaning 'mother and motherland are superior to heaven'.
- Indonesia: In Indonesia, Sanskrit is widely used as terms and mottoes of the armed forces and other national organisations (See: Indonesian Armed Forces mottoes). Rastra Sewakottama (राष्ट्र सेवकोत्तम, transl. 'people's main servants') is the official motto of the Indonesian National Police, Tri Dharma Eka Karma (त्रिधर्म एक कर्म) is the official motto of the Indonesian Military, Kartika Eka Paksi (कार्तिक एक पक्षी, transl. 'unmatchable bird with noble goals') is the official motto of the Indonesian Army, Adhitakarya Mahatvavirya Nagarabhakti (अधीतकार्य महत्ववीर्य नगरभक्ति, transl. 'hard-working knights serving bravery as nations hero') is the official motto of the Indonesian Military Academy, Upakriya Labdha Prayojana Balottama (उपक्रिया लब्ध प्रयोजन बालोत्तम, transl. 'purpose of the unit is to give the best service to the nation by finding the perfect soldier') is the official motto of the Army Psychological Corps, Karmanye Vadikaraste Mafalesu Kadatjana (कर्मण्येवाधिकारस्ते मा फलेषु कदाचन, transl. 'working without counting the profit and loss') is the official motto of the Air-Force Special Forces (Paskhas), Jalesu Bhumyamca Jayamahe (जलेषु भूम्यां च जयामहे, transl. 'on the sea and land we are glorious') is the official motto of the Indonesian Marine Corps, and there are more units and organisations in Indonesia either Armed Forces or civil which use the Sanskrit language respectively as their mottoes and other purposes.
- Many of India's and Nepal's scientific and administrative terms use Sanskrit. The Indian guided missile programme that was commenced in 1983 by the Defence Research and Development Organisation has named the five missiles (ballistic and others) that it developed Prithvi, Agni, Akash, Nag and the Trishul missile system. India's first modern fighter aircraft is named HAL Tejas.

In November 2020, Gaurav Sharma, a New Zealand politician of Indian origin swore into parliament using Sanskrit alongside Māori; the decision was made as a "homage to all Indian languages" compromising between his native Pahari and Punjabi.

=== In popular culture ===
The song My Sweet Lord by George Harrison includes The Hare Krishna mantra, also referred to reverentially as the Maha Mantra, a 16-word Vaishnava mantra which is mentioned in the Kali-Santarana Upanishad. Satyagraha, an opera by Philip Glass, uses texts from the Bhagavad Gita, sung in Sanskrit. In 1996, English psychedelic rock band Kula Shaker released Govinda, a song entirely sung in Sanskrit. The closing credits of The Matrix Revolutions has a prayer from the Brihadaranyaka Upanishad. The song "Cyber-raga" from Madonna's album Music includes Sanskrit chants, and Shanti/Ashtangi from her 1998 album Ray of Light, which won a Grammy, is the ashtanga vinyasa yoga chant. The lyrics include the mantra Om shanti. Composer John Williams featured choirs singing in Sanskrit for Indiana Jones and the Temple of Doom and in Star Wars: Episode I – The Phantom Menace. The theme song of Battlestar Galactica 2004 is the Gayatri Mantra, taken from the Rigveda. The lyrics of "The Child in Us" by Enigma also contain Sanskrit verses. In 2006, Mexican singer Paulina Rubio was influenced in Sanskrit for her concept album Ananda.

== See also ==
- Arsha prayoga
- Āryabhaṭa numeration
- List of Sanskrit-related topics
- Spitzer Manuscript
- Proto-Indo-Aryan
- Proto-Indo-Iranian
- Proto-Indo-European
