= List of institutions of higher education in Rajasthan =

This is a list of institutions of higher education in Rajasthan.

== Universities ==
=== Central Universities ===
- Central University of Rajasthan, Kishangarh, Ajmer.

=== Government State Universities ===
==== Multidisciplinary ====
- Govind Guru Tribal University, Banswara
- Jagadguru Ramanandacharya Rajasthan Sanskrit University, Jaipur
- Jai Narain Vyas University, Jodhpur
- Maharaja Ganga Singh University, Bikaner
- Maharaja Surajmal Brij University, Bharatpur, Bharatpur
- Maharshi Dayanand Saraswati University, Ajmer
- Mohanlal Sukhadia University, Udaipur
- Pandit Deendayal Upadhyaya Shekhawati University, Sikar
- Raj Rishi Bhartrihari Matsya University, Alwar
- Sardar Patel University of Police, Security and Criminal Justice, Jodhpur
- University of Kota
- University of Rajasthan, Jaipur

==== Technology ====
- Bikaner Technical University, Bikaner
- Rajasthan Technical University, Kota
- M.B.M. University, Jodhpur

==== Medicine ====
- Homoeopathy University, Jaipur
- Dr. Sarvepalli Radhakrishnan Rajasthan Ayurved University, Jodhpur
- Rajasthan University of Health Sciences, Jaipur

==== Agriculture ====
- Agriculture University, Jodhpur, Jodhpur
- Agriculture University, Kota, Kota
- Maharana Pratap University of Agriculture and Technology, Udaipur
- Sri Karan Narendra Agriculture University, Jobner
- Swami Keshwanand Rajasthan Agricultural University, Bikaner

==== Veterinary science ====
- Rajasthan University of Veterinary and Animal Sciences, Bikaner

==== Law ====
- National Law University, Jodhpur
- Dr. Bhimrao Ambedkar Law University, Jaipur, Rajasthan

==== Media ====
- Haridev Joshi University of Journalism and Mass Communication, Jaipur

==== Open Universities ====
- Vardhaman Mahaveer Open University, Kota

=== Private State Universities ===
- Amity University Rajasthan, Jaipur
- Bhagwant University, Ajmer
- Dr. K. N. Modi University, Niwai, Tonk
- Gyan Vihar University, Jaipur
- Jagannath University, Chakshu, Jaipur
- Jaipur National University, Jaipur
- JECRC University, Jaipur
- JK Lakshmipat University, Jaipur
- Jodhpur National University, Jodhpur
- LNM Institute of Information Technology, Jaipur
- Manipal University Jaipur
- Maulana Azad University, Jodhpur
- Mewar University, Chittorgarh
- Mody University, Laxmangarh, Sikar
- NIIT University, Neemrana
- NIMS University, Sobha Nagar, Jaipur
- OPJS University, Churu, Rajasthan
- Pacific Academy of Higher Education and Research Udaipur, Udaipur
- Poornima University, Jaipur
- RNB Global University, Bikaner
- Shri Khushan Das University, Hanumangarh
- Singhania University, Pacheri Bari, Jhunjhunu
- Sunrise University, Alwar
- Suresh Gyan Vihar University, Jaipur
- Tantia University, Sri Ganganagar
- University of Engineering & Management (UEM), Jaipur
- Vivekananda Global University, Jaipur

=== Deemed Universities ===
As of July 2017, there are seven deemed universities in Rajasthan.

- Banasthali Vidyapith, Vanasthali
- Birla Institute of Technology & Science, Pilani
- IIS University, Jaipur
- Institute of Advanced Studies in Education, Sardarshahar
- Jain Vishva Bharati University, Ladnu
- Janardan Rai Nagar Rajasthan Vidyapeeth University, Udaipur
- LNM Institute of Information Technology, Jaipur

== Institutes of National Importance ==
- Indian Institute of Technology Jodhpur
- Indian Institute of Management Udaipur
- All India Institute of Medical Sciences Jodhpur
- Malaviya National Institute of Technology, Jaipur
- Indian Institute of Information Technology, Kota
- National Institute of Fashion Technology, Jodhpur

== Colleges ==
Note: this is an incomplete list. There are over 200 colleges affiliated to Rajasthan Technical University.

=== Government bba colleges ===
- Arya Group Of Colleges, Jaipur
- Compucom Institute of Information Technology and Management (Ciitm), Jaipur
- Jaipur Engineering College, Kukas
- Jodhpur Institute of Engineering & Technology
- Laxmi Devi Institute of Engineering and Technology, Alwar
- Maharishi Arvind Institute of Engineering and Technology
- Poornima College Of Engineering, Jaipur
- University of Engineering & Management (UEM), Jaipur

=== Medicine ===
==== Government medical colleges ====
- Dr. S.N. Medical College, Jodhpur
- Government Medical College, Kota
- Dungarpur Medical College, Dungarpur
- Jawaharlal Nehru Medical College, Ajmer
- Jhalawar Medical College, Jhalawar
- Rabindranath Tagore Medical College, Udaipur
- Sardar Patel Medical College, Bikaner
- Sawai ManSingh Medical College, Jaipur
- Shri Kalyan Medical College, Sikar
- Vijayaraje Scindia Medical College, Bhilwara

==== Private medical colleges ====
- Arid Forest Research Institute (AFRI), Jodhpur
- Geetanjali Medical College, Udaipur
- Pacific Medical College and Hospital, Udaipur

Private Pharmacy Colleges

- Regional College of Pharmacy, Jaipur

==== Private Management Colleges ====
- Faculty of Management Studies – Institute of Rural Management, Jaipur (FMS-IRM)
