= List of law schools in Rajasthan affiliated with ALU =

List of law schools in Rajasthan

In Rajasthan there are 123 Legal education centers imparting legal education. All law colleges and legal education centres are affiliated with Dr. Bhimrao Ambedkar Law University except constituent part of Government Universities in the state of Rajasthan. Thirty three (33) districts are in state of Rajasthan. Details of legal education centres are as under:-

== Ajmer ==
Seven (7) legal education are in Ajmer district of Rajasthan.

- Maharshi Dayanand Saraswati University is a state public University.
- Bhagwant University is a state private University.
- Govt. Law College Ajmer

| Sr. No. | Established | Name of Legal Education Centre Affiliated with Dr. Bhimrao Ambedkar Law University. | Status/ Academic Head |
|---|---|---|---|
| 1. | 2003 | Sant Paramhans Law College | |
| 2. | 2003 | Ajaymeru Law Colleges | |
| 3. | 1970 | Dayanand College | |
| 4. | 2014 | St. Wilfred's Law College, Gegal | |

== Alwar ==
Nine (9) legal education are in Alwar district of Rajasthan.

- B.S.R. Govt. Arts College
- Arya Kanya Vidhi Mahavidyalaya, (college closed from 2010 to 2011) (LE Mtg dated 30.4.2010) Item No. 35/2010
- Raffles University, Neemrana since 2011
- Sunrise University since 2012

| Sr. No. | Established | Name of Legal Education Centre Affiliated with Dr. Bhimrao Ambedkar Law University. | Academic Head of the CLE |
|---|---|---|---|
| 1. | | Shri Krishna Academy of Legal Studies | |
| 2. | | Siddhi Vinayak College of Law | |
| 3. | | Maa Kalawati Vidhi Mahavidyalaya | |
| 4. | | Seth Rajnarayan Gupta Law College for Women Babakheta Nath Vidyapeeth, Bhitera | |
| 5. | | Institute of Professional Studies and Research | |

== Banswara ==
One legal education is in Banswara district of Rajasthan.

- Dr. Nagendra Singh College of Law, Bharatiya Vidya Mandir, Banswara (No admission in 2006–07, 2007-08 & 2008–09)

== Baran ==
There is no law school (legal education centre) in Baran district of Rajasthan.

- No law School

== Barmer ==
There is no law school (legal education centre) in Banrmer district of Rajasthan.

- No law School

== Bharatpur ==
Two legal education are in Bharatpur district of Rajasthan.

- M.S.J. Govt. College

| Sr. No. | Established | Name of Legal Education Centre Affiliated with Dr. Bhimrao Ambedkar Law University. | Academic Head of the CLE |
|---|---|---|---|
| 1. | | Khandelwal Law College | |

== Bhilwara ==
Three legal education are in Bhilwara district of Rajasthan.

- Acharya Chanakya Law College
- Sangam University
- Shri M. L.V. Govt. College

== Bikaner ==
Six (6) legal education are in Bikaner district of Rajasthan.

- RNB Global University
- University of Bikaner
- B.J.S.R. Jain College
- Govt. Dunger College
- Gyan Vidhi Mahavidyalaya
- Y. M. Law College (Further no admission.)

== Bundi ==
One legal education is in Bundi district of Rajasthan.

- Govt. College

== Chittorgarh ==
Two legal education are in Chittorgarh district of Rajasthan.

- Mewar University
- Ravindranath Tagore Law College, Gandhi Nagar (No admission in 2005–06)

== Churu ==
Two legal education are in Churu district of Rajasthan.

- OPJS University
- Govt. Law College, Churu

== Dausa ==
One legal education is in Dausa district of Rajasthan.

- Dausa Law College

== Dholpur ==
One legal education is in Dholpur district of Rajasthan.

- Govt. College Dholpur

== Dungarpur ==
- No law School

== Hanumangarh ==
Two legal education are in Hanumangarh district of Rajasthan.

- N. M. law College
- Swami Keshwanand Vidhi Mahavidyalaya, Sangaria

== Jaipur ==
Thirty eight (Thirty eight) legal education are in Jaipur district of Rajasthan.

- Amity University, Jaipur established in 2008.
- Dr. Bhimrao Ambedkar Law University
- ICFAI University, Jaipur
- Jagan Nath University, Jaipur
- Jaipur National University, Jagatpura, Seedling School of Law and Governance
- Jayoti Vidyapeeth Women's University
- JECRC University
- Maharaj Vinayak Global University
- Mahatma Jyoti Rao Phoole University (MJRP)
- Maharishi Arvind University
- Manipal University Jaipur
- NIMS University
- University of Rajasthan
- University Law College, Centre II, University of Rajasthan
- University five year law college, University of Rajasthan
- Vivekananda Global University

| Sr. No. | Established | Name of Legal Education Centre | Academic Head of the CLE |
|---|---|---|---|
| 1 | | Akshadeep Girls Law College | |
| 2 | | Alankar Girl's Law College | |
| 3 | | Bhagwan Mahaveer Law College and Research Centre | |
| 4 | | Bharat Law College | |
| 5 | | Biyani Law College | |
| 6 | | Deepshikha Law College | |
| 7 | | Hans Law College, Kotputli | |
| 8 | | Jaipur Law College | |
| 9 | | Maharshi Dayanand Law College | |
| 10 | | Mahaveer(Mahavir) Law College | |
| 11 | | Master Somnath Law College | |
| 12 | | Rajdhani Law College | |
| 13 | | Rajputana Law College | |
| 14 | | Sanjay College of Law | |
| 15 | | Shaheed Bhagat Singh Vidhi Mahavidyalaya, Khatipura | |
| 16 | | St. Wilfred's College of Law | |
| 17 | | S.S. Jain Subodh Law College | |
| 18 | | Shri Bhawani Niketan Law College | |
| 19 | | Shri Krishna Law College, Kotputli | |
| 20 | | Tagore Public Law College, Kotputli | |
| 21 | | Vidyasthali Law College | |
| 22 | | Vinayak Law College, Vinayak Vihar, Chomu | |

== Jaisalmer ==
- No law School

== Jalore ==
One legal education is in Jalore district of Rajasthan.

- Ashapurna Law College

== Jhalawar ==
One legal education is in Jhalawar district of Rajasthan.

- Govt. College

== Jhunjhunu ==
Seven (7) legal education are in Jhunjhunu district of Rajasthan.

- Baba Mungipa College of Law, Pilani
- Mahima Vidhi Mahavidyalaya
- Smt. Pana Devi Rameshwar Lal Sharma Law College, Chirawa
- Seth Motilal Law College
- Rajasthan Law College, Chirawa
- Shri Jagadishprasad Jhabarmal Tibrewala University
- Sridhar University, Pilani

== Jodhpur ==
Five (5) legal education are in Jodhpur district of Rajasthan.

- Jai Narain Vyas University
- Prof. A.D. Bohra Memorial Women's Law College, (Old Name-Mahila Vidhi Mahavidyalaya)
- Jodhpur Law College and Research Centre
- Jodhpur National University (JNL)
- National Law University, Jodhpur

== Karauli ==
One legal education is in Karauli district of Rajasthan.

- Veena Memorial Law College, "College has been closed by LEC Mtg 26.04.15"

== Kota ==
Six (6) legal education are in Kota district of Rajasthan.

- University of Kota
- Bharat Law College
- Govt. College
- Modi Law College
- Execellent Law College

== Nagaur ==
Two legal education is in Nagaur district of Rajasthan.

- Sawai Law College, Deedwana
- Shri B.R.Mirdha Govt.College

== Pali ==
One legal education is in Pali district of Rajasthan.

- Govt. Bangur College

== Pratapgarh ==
- No law School

== Rajsamand ==
Two legal education are in Rajsamand district of Rajasthan.

- Dwarkesh Law College, Rajsamand
- Saint Meera Law College, Nathdwara

== Sawai Madhopur ==
Two legal education are in Sawai Madhopur district of Rajasthan.

- Ranthambore Law College, (no permission for admission from 2009 to 2010. College closed)
- Shahid Captain Repudeman Vidhi Mahavidyalaya

== Sikar ==
Five (5) legal education are in Sikar district of Rajasthan.

- S.K. Govt. College
- Mody University of Science & Technology, Lakshmangarh
- Pandit Deendayal Upadhyaya Shekhawati University
- Shaheed Bhagat Singh Law College
- Rajasthan Law College (closed from 2010 to 2011)

== Sirohi ==
Two legal education are in Sirohi district of Rajasthan.

- Madhav University
- Government Law College

== Sri Ganganagar ==
Five (5) legal education are in Ganganagar district of Rajasthan.

- Maharishi Dayanand Law College
- Tantia University
- Seth G. L. Bihani S. D. Law College
- S.G.N. Khalsa College
- Govt. P. G. College

== Tonk ==
Four legal education are in Tonk district of Rajasthan.

- Banasthali Vidyapith, Niwai
- Dr. Ambedkar Vidhi Mahavidyalaya
- Rajiv Gandhi Mahavidyalaya
- Dr. K.N.Modi University

== Udaipur ==
Seven (7) legal education are in Udaipur district of Rajasthan.

- Janardan Rai Nagar Rajasthan Vidyapeeth
- Mohanlal Sukhadia University since 1945
- Udaipur College of Law Studies
- Bhupal Nobel's Law College
- Vardhman College
- Dr. Anushka Vidhi Mahavidyalaya, (No admission in 2005–06)
- Pacific University (India)
