= NAAC accredited universities in Rajasthan =

Banasthali Vidyapith
- Location: Banasthali, Rajasthan, India
- Affiliations: NAAC, UGC

Rajasthan has over 50 private, state and central government Universities which makes it one of the leading states in Indian higher education system. The National Assessment and Accreditation Council is leading system of quality system for higher educational institutions established by the Ministry of Human Resource Development under University Grants Commission (India) . The NAAC accreditation is the official measure of Government of India for quality in education, course delivery, research in all fields including engineering, management, sciences, social sciences, pharmacy, hotel management. Through a rigorous process of inspections and peer review, the council gives scores out of 4 and calculates grades according to the score. Highest scoring university in Rajasthan by NAAC score is Banasthali Vidyapith. Banasthali Vidyapith was awarded A++ grade which is highest in Rajasthan. The list includes all universities in Rajasthan which have gone through the NAAC accreditation process. All of these universities have varying undergraduate programs like B.Tech., BBA, BCA, B.Pharmacy as well as postgraduate programs like M.Tech., MBA, MCA etc.

== List of Ranking of Universities in Rajasthan by NAAC Score ==
The list is produced by National Assessment and Accreditation Council and updated over the years. Recently, Bhagwant University was blacklisted for five years until a re-accreditation procedure takes place.

List of University of Rajasthan	Type	NAAC Grade	NAAC Score	Award Date	Date Valid	Location
Banasthali Vidyapith (Deemed University)	Deemed	A++	3.63	11/03/20		Tonk
Birla Institute of Technology and Science (Deemed-to-be-University u/s 3 of the UGC Act 1956)	Deemed	A	3.45	16/12/16	15/12/21	Pilani
University of Rajasthan	State	A	3.21	17/03/16	16/03/21	Jaipur
Raj Rishi Bhartrihari Matsya University	State	A	3.21	17/03/16	16/03/21	Alwar
The LNM Institute of Information Technology (Deemed-to-be-University u/s 3 of the UGC Act, 1956)	Deemed	A	3.15	16/09/16	15/09/21	Jaipur
Suresh Gyan Vihar University	State Private	A	3.1	28/03/17	27/03/22	Jaipur
Janardan Rai Nagar Rajasthan Vidyapeeth	Deemed	A	3.04	16/12/16	15/12/21	Udaipur
Central University of Rajasthan	Central	A	3.01	16/09/16	15/09/21	Ajmer
Mohanlal Sukhadia University	State	A	3.01	05/05/14		Udaipur
JK Lakshmipat University	State	A	3.05	26/04/22	25/04/27	Jaipur
Maharshi Dayanand Saraswati University	State	B++	2.8	02/05/17	01/05/22	Ajmer
Amity University Rajasthan	State Private	A+	3.31	22/09/23	21/09/28	Jaipur
IIS University (Deemed to be University u/s 3 of the UGC Act 1956),	Deemed	B++	2.76	05/05/14		Jaipur
RNB Global University	State Private	A	3.19	21/06/2025	20/06/2030	Bikaner
Jain Vishva Bharati Institute	Deemed	B+	2.73	01/05/19	30/04/24	Nagaur
Jayoti Vidyapeeth Women's University	State Private	B+	2.63	30/11/18	29/11/23	Jaipur
NIMS University	State Private	B+	2.54	08/02/19	07/02/24	Jaipur
Institute of Advanced Studies in Education (IASE)	Deemed	B	2.5	16/11/15	15/11/20	Churu
Jai Narain Vyas University	State	B	2.5	08/01/11		Jodhpur
Jagannath University	State Private	B	2.35	15/11/15	14/11/20	Jaipur
Jaipur National University	State Private	B++	2.76	03/05/22	02/05/27	Jaipur
JECRC University	State Private	B	2.17	08/02/19	07/02/24	Jaipur
University of Kota	State	B	2.11	12/09/17	11/09/22	Kota
Mewar University	State Private	A	3.01	23/05/24	22/05/29	Chittorgarh
Jodhpur Institute of Engineering and Technology	Private	A				

== See also ==
- List of universities in Rajasthan
- List of universities in India
- List of private universities in India
- List of central universities in India
- List of state universities in India
- List of deemed universities in India
- List of autonomous higher education institutes in India
- List of Institutes of National Importance
