= Association of Commonwealth Universities =

Educational organization

- Abbreviation: ACU
- Formation: 1913; 113 years ago
- Type: Charitable organisation
- Headquarters: London, England, UK
- Secretary General: Colin Riordan
- Website: acu.ac.uk

The Association of Commonwealth Universities (ACU) is a charitable organisation that was established in 1913 which has over 400 member institutions in over 40 countries across the Commonwealth of Nations. The ACU is the world's oldest international network of universities. Its mission is to promote and support excellence in higher education for the benefit of individuals and societies throughout the Commonwealth and beyond.

The Association of Commonwealth Universities is governed by its member institutions through an elected council. As the ACU is a UK-registered charity, council members also act as its Trustees. The ACU Council comprises up to 23 members: 20 elected council members, up to two co-opted council members and, if the Honorary Treasurer is co-opted rather than elected, the Honorary Treasurer.

== History ==
In 1912, the University of London took the initiative to assemble 53 representatives of universities in London to hold a Congress of Universities of the Empire. They decided they needed a "bureau of information". Its affairs would be handled by a committee representing universities at home and abroad. In 1913 the office opened as the Universities Bureau of the British Empire. They incorporated under licence of the Board of Trade in 1919 and received a grant of £5000 to operate an office premises, with the understanding that the universities of the Empire would fund its maintenance. In 1948 the name was changed to Association of Universities of the British Commonwealth, and in 1963 it changed to its current name.

Anastasios Christodoulou was the Secretary General of the Association of Commonwealth Universities from 1980 to 1996.

In 1986, Queen Elizabeth II became patron of the Association of Commonwealth Universities. In 2019, Meghan, Duchess of Sussex became patron of the Association of Commonwealth Universities, a role which she held until February 2021. King Charles III was announced as the organisation's patron in May 2024.

== Membership ==
Currently 40 countries from the Commonwealth are represented in the Association.

=== Criteria ===
Member universities are divided into full and associate categories, with the latter not holding voting rights. Full members must:

- Be legally incorporated and based in the Commonwealth, or have chosen to retain membership in the ACU when the country where they are based left the Commonwealth.
- Be authorised to provide higher education.
- Hold their own degree awarding powers.
- Have at least 250 full time equivalent students, of which over half are studying at degree level.
- Have graduated at least one cohort of students.

The criteria for associate membership are similar, except that the requirement to be able to award their own degrees is replaced by a requirement that their students may be awarded degrees of another institution under a franchise, license or other collaborative agreement, and that the institution whose degrees are being awarded is itself eligible for full membership of the ACU and is located in the Commonwealth.

=== Criticism ===
The University of Malta professor Godfrey Baldacchino opposes the process by which Maltese academics become associate or full professors: as of 2016, applications were sent to and judged by the Association, which then returns its recommendations to Malta. Baldacchino called it "embarrassing" and "neo-colonial", and he campaigned for slowly replacing this process with a local one.

=== List of Commonwealth Universities (ACU) ===
==== Australia ====
- Charles Sturt University
- Curtin University
- Edith Cowan University
- Griffith University
- Macquarie University
- Murdoch University
- RMIT University
- University of Adelaide
- University of Newcastle
- University of Canberra
- University of Melbourne
- University of Southern Queensland
- University of Sydney
- University of Tasmania
- University of the Sunshine Coast
- University of Wollongong
- University of New South Wales
- Western Sydney University

==== Bangladesh ====
- Asian University for Women
- Gazipur Agricultural University (Bengali: গাজীপুর কৃষি বিশ্ববিদ্যালয় (গাকৃবি))
- Bangladesh Agricultural University (Bengali: বাংলাদেশ কৃষি বিশ্ববিদ্যালয়)
- Bangladesh Open University (Bengali: বাংলাদেশ উন্মুক্ত বিশ্ববিদ্যালয়)
- Bangladesh University of Business and Technology (Bengali: বাংলাদেশ ইউনিভার্সিটি অফ বিজনেস অ্যান্ড টেকনোলজি)
- Bangladesh University of Engineering and Technology (Bengali: বাংলাদেশ প্রকৌশল বিশ্ববিদ্যালয়)
- BGMEA University of Fashion & Technology (Bengali: বিজিএমইএ ফ্যাশন অ্যান্ড টেকনোলজি বিশ্ববিদ্যালয়)
- Daffodil International University (Bengali: ড্যাফোডিল আন্তর্জাতিক বিশ্ববিদ্যালয়)
- International Islamic University, Chittagong (Bengali: আন্তর্জাতিক ইসলামী বিশ্ববিদ্যালয় চট্টগ্রাম)
- International University of Business Agriculture and Technology (Bengali: ইন্টারন্যাশনাল ইউনিভার্সিটি অব বিজনেস এগ্রিকালচার অ্যান্ড টেকনোলজি)
- Islamic University, Bangladesh (Bengali: ইসলামী বিশ্ববিদ্যালয়, বাংলাদেশ)
- Jahangirnagar University (Bengali: জাহাঙ্গীরনগর বিশ্ববিদ্যালয়)
- Khulna University (Bengali: খুলনা বিশ্ববিদ্যালয়)
- Metropolitan University, Sylhet (Bengali: মেট্রোপলিটন ইউনিভার্সিটি)
- Shahjalal University of Science and Technology (Bengali: শাহজালাল বিজ্ঞান ও প্রযুক্তি বিশ্ববিদ্যালয়)
- Southern University, Bangladesh (Bengali: সাদার্ন ইউনিভার্সিটি বাংলাদেশ)
- University of Asia Pacific (Bengali: ইউনিভার্সিটি অব এশিয়া প্যাসিফিক)
- University of Chittagong (Bengali: চট্টগ্রাম বিশ্ববিদ্যালয়)
- University of Dhaka (Bengali: ঢাকা বিশ্ববিদ্যালয়)
- World University of Bangladesh (Bengali: ওয়ার্ল্ড ইউনিভার্সিটি অব বাংলাদেশ)

==== Barbados ====
- University of the West Indies at Cave Hill

==== Botswana ====
- University of Botswana

==== Brunei Darussalam ====
- Sultan Sharif Ali Islamic University (Malay: Universiti Islam Sultan Sharif Ali)
- University of Technology Brunei (Malay: Universiti Teknologi Brunei)

==== Cameroon ====
- The University of Bamenda
- University of Buea
- University of Yaounde I (French: Université de Yaoundé I)

==== Canada ====
- Athabasca University
- Dalhousie University
- Kwantlen Polytechnic University
- MacEwan University
- McGill University (French: Université McGill)
- McMaster University
- Memorial University of Newfoundland
- Queen's University at Kingston
- Toronto Metropolitan University
- University of Alberta (French: Université de l'Alberta)
- University of British Columbia
- University of Calgary
- University of Guelph
- University of Lethbridge
- University of Manitoba (French: Université du Manitoba)
- University of Northern British Columbia
- University of Ontario Institute of Technology
- University of Ottawa (French: Université d'Ottawa)
- University of Regina (French: Université de Regina)
- University of Saskatchewan
- University of Toronto
- University of Waterloo
- Vancouver Island University
- Western University
- York University (French: Université York)

==== Cyprus ====
- Cyprus Institute of Marketing
- The Philips College
- University of Cyprus
- University of Nicosia (Greek: Πανεπιστήμιο Λευκωσίας
  Turkish: Lefkoşa Üniversitesi)

==== Dominica ====
- All Saints University School of Medicine

==== Eswatini ====
- University of Eswatini

==== Fiji ====
- Fiji National University
- University of Fiji
- The University of the South Pacific

==== Ghana ====
- Ghana Institute of Management and Public Administration
- Kumasi Polytechnic
- Kwame Nkrumah University of Science and Technology
- University for Development Studies
- University of Cape Coast
- University of Education Winneba
- University of Ghana
- University of Mines and Technology
- University of Professional Studies, Accra
- Valley View University

==== Gibraltar ====
- University of Gibraltar

==== Guyana ====
- Texila American University
- University of Guyana

==== Hong Kong ====
- Chinese University of Hong Kong (Chinese: 香港中文大學)
- The University of Hong Kong (Chinese: 香港大學)

==== India ====
- Academy of Scientific and Innovative Research
- Acharya Nagarjuna University
- Alagappa University
- Aligarh Muslim University
- Amity University, Noida
- Amity University Rajasthan
- Andhra University
- Annamalai University
- Apeejay Stya University
- Assam Don Bosco University
- Awadhesh Pratap Singh University
- Bhagat Phool Singh Mahila Vishwavidyalaya
- B.S. Abdur Rahman Crescent Institute of Science and Technology
- Baba Farid University of Health Sciences
- Babasaheb Bhimrao Ambedkar University
- Banasthali University
- Bangalore University
- Berhampur University
- Bhagwant University
- Bharathiar University
- Bharathidasan University
- Birla Institute of Technology
- Birla Institute of Technology and Science, Pilani
- Bundelkhand University, Jhansi
- Career Point University, Kota
- Central Agricultural University
- Central University of Gujarat
- Central University of Kashmir
- Central University of Punjab
- Central University of Tibetan Studies
- Chandigarh University
- Charotar University of Science and Technology
- University of Engineering & Management (UEM), Jaipur
- Cochin University of Science and Technology
- Deenbandhu Chhotu Ram University of Science and Technology
- Dev Sanskriti Vishwavidyalaya
- Devi Ahilya Vishwavidyalaya
- Dharmsinh Desai University
- Dibrugarh University
- Dr. B.R. Ambedkar Open University
- Dr. B.R. Ambedkar University, Delhi
- Dravidian University
- English and Foreign Languages University
- Fakir Mohan University
- Gandhigram Rural University
- Ganpat University
- Gauhati University
- GITAM University
- Gujarat Forensic Sciences University
- Gulbarga University
- Guru Ghasidas Vishwavidyalaya
- Guru Gobind Singh Indraprastha University
- Guru Jambheshwar University of Science and Technology
- Guru Nanak Dev University
- Gurukula Kangri University
- Hemchandracharya North Gujarat University
- Himachal Pradesh University
- Hindustan Institute of Technology and Science
- ICFAI Foundation for Higher Education
- ICFAI University, Dehradun
- ICFAI University, Meghalaya
- ICFAI University, Mizoram
- ICFAI University, Nagaland
- ICFAI University, Sikkim
- ICFAI University, Tripura
- I. K. Gujral Punjab Technical University
- Indian Institute of Science
- Indian Institute of Technology (Indian School of Mines), Dhanbad
- Jai Narain Vyas University
- Jamia Hamdard
- Jamia Millia Islamia
- Jawaharlal Nehru University
- Jayoti Vidyapeeth Women's University
- Jharkhand Rai University
- JSS University
- Kakatiya University
- Kannur University
- Karnatak University Dharwad
- Karnataka State Open University
- KIIT University
- Kurukshetra University
- Kuvempu University
- Lala Lajpat Rai University of Veterinary & Animal Sciences
- Lovely Professional University
- Madhya Pradesh Bhoj Open University
- Madurai Kamaraj University
- Maharaja Sriram Chandra Bhanja Deo University
- Maharishi Markandeshwar University
  - Solan
  - Sadopur
  - Mullana
- Maharshi Dayanand Saraswati University
- Maharshi Dayanand University
- Makhanlal Chaturvedi National University of Journalism and Communication
- Manipal Academy of Higher Education
- Manipur University
- Manonmaniam Sundaranar University
- Maulana Azad National Urdu University
- Mohanlal Sukhadia University
- Mother Teresa Women's University
- NALSAR University of Law
- National Law University, Delhi
- National Law University, Jodhpur
- National Law University Odisha
- Nirma University
- North-Eastern Hill University
- O. P. Jindal Global University
- Osmania University
- Panjab University
- Patna University
- Pondicherry University
- Pravara Institute of Medical Sciences
- Punjabi University
- Rajiv Gandhi National University of Law
- Rajiv Gandhi University
- Rajiv Gandhi University of Health Sciences
- Rashtrasant Tukadoji Maharaj Nagpur University
- Sam Higginbottom University of Agriculture, Technology and Sciences
- Sambalpur University
- Sanskriti University
- Sant Gadge Baba Amravati University
- Saurashtra University
- School of Planning and Architecture, New Delhi
- Sharda University
- Shivaji University
- Shri Mata Vaishno Devi University
- Sikkim Manipal University
- Solapur University
- South Asian University
- Sree Chitra Tirunal Institute for Medical Sciences and Technology
- Sri Krishnadevaraya University
- Sri Padmavati Mahila Visvavidyalayam
- Sri Ramachandra University
- SRM Institute of Science and Technology
- Swami Ramanand Teerth Marathwada University
- Tamil Nadu Dr. M.G.R. Medical University
- Tamil Nadu Open University
- Tamil Nadu Veterinary and Animal Sciences University
- Tamil University
- Tata Institute of Social Sciences
- Tezpur University
- The Northcap University
- Tilka Manjhi Bhagalpur University
- Tripura University
- University of Allahabad
- University of Calcutta
- University of Calicut
- University of Delhi
- University of Hyderabad
- University of Jammu
- University of Kerala
- University of Lucknow
- University of Madras
- University of Mumbai
- University of Mysore
- University of Science and Technology, Meghalaya
- Utkal University
- Vels University
- Vel Tech Rangarajan Dr. Sagunthala R&D Institute of Science and Technology
- Vidya Pratishthan's College of Engineering, Baramati
- Vinoba Bhave University
- Visva-Bharati University
- Visvesvaraya Technological University
- Yashwantrao Chavan Maharashtra Open University

==== Jamaica ====
- Caribbean Maritime Institute
- The University of the West Indies
- University of Technology, Jamaica

==== Kenya ====
- Catholic University of Eastern Africa
- Kenyatta University
- Maseno University
- Moi University
- Mount Kenya University
- South Eastern Kenya University
- Strathmore University
- Technical University of Kenya
- Machakos University
- United States International University Africa
- University of Nairobi

==== Lesotho ====
- National University of Lesotho

==== Malawi ====
- Lilongwe University of Agriculture and Natural Resources
- Mzuzu University
- University of Malawi

==== Malaysia ====
- Asia e University
- Asia Metropolitan University
- Asia Pacific University of Technology & Innovation (Malay: Universiti Teknologi dan Inovasi Asia Pasifik)
- University of Cyberjaya (Malay: Universiti Cyberjaya)
- GlobalNxt University
- UOW Malaysia KDU University College
- Limkokwing University of Creative Technology (Malay: Universiti Teknologi Kreatif Limkokwing, Chinese: 林国荣创意工艺大学)
- Lincoln University College, Malaysia
- Management and Science University
- Manipal International University
- North Borneo University College
- Quest International University Perak
- Raffles University Iskandar
- Sultan Azlan Shah University (Malay: Universiti Sultan Azlan Shah Malaysia)
- National University of Malaysia (Malay: Universiti Kebangsaan Malaysia, Chinese: 马来西亚国立大学)
- Universiti Malaysia Sabah (Chinese: 沙巴大学)
- Universiti Malaysia Sarawak
- Universiti Putra Malaysia
- University of Science, Malaysia (Malay: Universiti Sains Malaysia, Chinese: 马来西亚理科大学)
- Universiti Tenaga Nasional
- Universiti Tun Abdul Razak
- Universiti Tunku Abdul Rahman (Chinese: 拉曼大学, Tamil: துங்கு அப்துல் ரகுமான் பல்கலைக்கழகம், اونيۏرسيتي تونكو عبدالرحمن)
- Universiti Utara Malaysia

==== Malaysia ====
- University of Malaya (Malay: Universiti Malaya)

==== Maldives ====
- Villa College

==== Malta ====
- University of Malta (Maltese: L-Università ta' Malta)
- Global College Malta

==== Mauritius ====
- Open University of Mauritius
- University of Mauritius (French: Université de Maurice)
- University of Technology Mauritius

==== Mozambique ====
- Eduardo Mondlane University (Portuguese: Universidade Eduardo Mondlane)

==== Namibia ====
- University of Namibia

==== New Zealand ====
- Auckland University of Technology (Māori: Te Wānanga Aronui o Tāmaki Makau Rau)
- Lincoln University (Māori: Te Whare Wānaka o Aoraki)
- Massey University (Māori: Te Kunenga ki Pūrehuroa)
- University of Auckland (Māori: Waipapa Taumata Rau)
- University of Canterbury (Māori: Te Whare Wānanga o Waitaha)
- University of Otago (Māori: Te Whare Wānanga o Otāgo)
- Victoria University of Wellington (Māori: Te Herenga Waka)

==== Nigeria ====
- Adekunle Ajasin University

==== Nigeria ====
- Afe Babalola University
- Ahmadu Bello University
- Bayero University
- Covenant University
- Delta State University
- Ebonyi State University
- Ekiti State University
- Federal University of Agriculture, Abeokuta
- Federal University of Technology Akure
- Federal University of Technology Minna
- Gombe State University
- Federal University of Technology, Yola
- Niger Delta University
- Nnamdi Azikiwe University
- Redeemer's University
- Rivers State University
- University of Benin (Nigeria)
- University of Calabar
- University of Ibadan
- University of Ilorin
- University of Jos
- University of Lagos
- University of Maiduguri
- University of Nigeria

==== Nigeria ====
- University of Port Harcourt

==== Pakistan ====
- Air University (Urdu: جامعہ فضایہ)
- Bahria University (Urdu: جامعہ بحریہ)
- Balochistan University of Information Technology, Engineering & Management Sciences
- Capital University of Science & Technology (Urdu: جامعہ دارالحکومت سائنس و ٹیکنالوجی)
- COMSATS Institute of Information Technology
- Fatima Jinnah Women University (Urdu: فاطمہ جناح وؤمن یونیورسٹی)
- Greenwich University
- Institute of Business Administration Karachi
- Institute of Business Management
- Islamia University Bahawalpur
- Isra University (Urdu: جامعہ اسراء)
- Jinnah Sindh Medical University (Sindhi: جناح سندھ میڈیکل یونیورسٹی, جناح سنڌ ميڊيڪل يونيورسٽي)
- Mehran University of Engineering and Technology (Sindhi: مھراڻ يونيورسٽي آف انجنيئرنگ اينڊ ٽيڪنالاجي)
- National Defence University (Urdu: نیشنل ڈیفنس یونیورسٹی)
- National University of Sciences and Technology
- NED University of Engineering and Technology (Sindhi: اِن اِى ڊي يونيورسٽي آف انجنيئرنگ اينڊ ٽيڪنالاجي )
- Pir Mehr Ali Shah Arid Agriculture University
- Riphah International University
- Shaheed Zulfikar Ali Bhutto Institute of Science and Technology
- Sindh Madressatul Islam University (Urdu: سندھ مدرسۃ الاسلام)
- Sir Syed University of Engineering and Technology
- University of Engineering and Technology, Lahore (Urdu: جامعہ ہندسیہ و تکنیکیہ لاہور)
- University of Engineering and Technology, Peshawar
- University of Sindh (Urdu: جامعہ سندھ)
- University of the Punjab (Urdu: جامعہ پنجاب)
- Ziauddin University (Urdu: جامعہ ضیاء الدین)

==== Papua New Guinea ====
- Divine Word University
- Papua New Guinea University of Technology
- University of Papua New Guinea

==== Rwanda ====
- University of Rwanda

==== Saint Kitts and Nevis ====
- University of Medicine and Health Sciences

==== Saint Vincent and the Grenadines ====
- All Saints University School of Medicine
- Saint James School of Medicine

==== Seychelles ====
- University of Seychelles

| Seychellois Creole: Liniversite Sesel

==== Sierra Leone ====
- University of Sierra Leone

==== Singapore ====
- Nanyang Technological University (Malay: Universiti Teknologi Nanyang
  Chinese: 南洋理工大学
  Tamil: நன்யாங் தொழில்நுட்ப பல்கலைக்கழகம்)
- National University of Singapore (Malay: Universiti Nasional Singapura
  Chinese: 新加坡国立大学
  Tamil: சிங்கப்பூர் தேசிய பல்கலைக்கழகம்)

==== South Africa ====
- Cape Peninsula University of Technology
- Central University of Technology
- Durban University of Technology
- Inyuvesi yasethekwini yezobuchwepheshe
- Mangosuthu University of Technology
- Nelson Mandela University
- North-West University
- Yunibesiti ya Bokone-Bophirima
  Afrikaans: Noordwes-Universiteit
- Rhodes University
- Sefako Makgatho Health Sciences University
- Sol Plaatje University
- Stellenbosch University (Afrikaans: Universiteit Stellenbosch)
- Tshwane University of Technology
- University of Cape Town (Afrikaans: Universiteit van Kaapstad)
  iYunivesithi yaseKapa
- University of Johannesburg
- University of KwaZulu-Natal
- University of Mpumalanga
- University of Pretoria (Afrikaans: Universiteit van Pretoria
  Sotho: Yunibesithi ya Pretoria)
- University of South Africa
- University of the Free State (Afrikaans: Universiteit van die Vrystaat)
  Yunivesithi ya Freistata
- University of the Western Cape (Afrikaans: Universiteit van Wes-Kaapland)
- University of the Witwatersrand (Afrikaans: Universiteit van die Witwatersrand)
- University of Limpopo
- University of Zululand

==== South Africa ====
- Vaal University of Technology

==== Sri Lanka ====
- Buddhasravaka Bhiksu University
- Buddhist and Pali University of Sri Lanka (Sinhala: ශ්‍රී ලංකා බෞද්ධ හා පාලි විශ්වවිද්‍යාලය)
- Colombo International Nautical and Engineering College
- Eastern University, Sri Lanka (Sinhala: ශ්‍රී ලංකා නැගෙනහිර විශ්වවිද්‍යාලය)
- General Sir John Kotelawala Defence University (Sinhala: ජෙනරාල් ශ්‍රීමත් ජෝන් කොතලාවල ආරක්ෂක විශ්වවිද්‍යාලය)
- Horizon Campus
- International Institute of Health Sciences
- NSBM Green University (Sinhala: ජාතික ව්‍යාපාර කළමනාකාරීත්ව විද්‍යායතනය, Tamil: என் எஸ் பீ எம் பசுமை பல்கலைக்கழகம்)
- Open University of Sri Lanka (Sinhala: ශ්‍රී ලංකා විවෘත විශ්ව විද්‍යාලය, Tamil: இலங்கை திறந்த பல்கலைக்கழகம்)
- Rajarata University of Sri Lanka
- Sabaragamuwa University of Sri Lanka (Sinhala: ශ්‍රී ලංකා සබරගමුව විශ්වවිද්‍යාලය, Tamil: இலங்கை சபரகமுவ பல்கலைக்கழகத்தின்)
- South Eastern University of Sri Lanka (Sinhala: ශ්‍රී ලංකා අග්නිදිග විශ්වවිද්‍යාලය, Tamil: தென்கிழக்குப் பல்கலைக்கழகம், இலங்கை)
- Sri Lanka Institute of Information Technology (Sinhala: ශ්‍රී ලංකා තොරතුරු තා‌ක්ෂණ ආයතනය, Tamil: இலங்கை தகவல் தொழில்நுட்ப நிறுவனம்)
- University of Colombo (Sinhala: කොළඹ විශ්වවිද්‍යාලය, Tamil: கொழும்புப் பல்கலைக்கழகம்)
- University of Jaffna (Tamil: யாழ்ப்பாணப் பல்கலைக்கழகம், Sinhala: යාපනය විශ්වවිද්‍යාලය)
- University of Kelaniya (Sinhala: කැළණිය විශ්වවිද්‍යාලය, Tamil: களனி பல்கலைக்கழகம்)
- University of Moratuwa (Sinhala: මොරටුව විශ්වවිද්‍යාලය, Tamil: மொறட்டுவைப் பல்கலைக்கழகம்)
- University of Peradeniya (Sinhala: පේරාදෙණිය විශ්ව විද්‍යාලය, Tamil: பேராதனைப் பல்கலைக்கழகம்)
- University of Ruhuna (Sinhala: රුහුණ විශ්වවිද්‍යාලය, Tamil: ருகுண பல்கலைக் கழகம்)
- University of Sri Jayewardenepura (Sinhala: ශ්‍රී ජයවර්ධනපුර විශ්වවිද්‍යාලය, Tamil: ஸ்ரீ ஜயவர்தனபுர பல்கலைக்கழகம்)
- University of the Visual and Performing Arts (Sinhala: සෞන්දර්යය කලා විශ්වවිද්‍යාලය, Tamil: கட்புல, அரங்கேற்றக் கலைகள் பல்கலைக்கழகம்)
- University of Vocational Technology (Sinhala: වෘත්තීය තාක්ෂණ විශ්වවිද්‍යාලය)
- Uva Wellassa University (Sinhala: ශ්‍රී ලංකා ඌව වෙල්ලස්ස විශ්වවිද්‍යාලය)
- Wayamba University of Sri Lanka (Sinhala: ශ්‍රී ලංකා වයඹ විශ්වවිද්‍යාලය, Tamil: இலங்கை வயம்ப பல்கலைக்கழகம்)

==== Tanzania ====
- Ardhi University (Swahili: Chuo Kikuu Ardhi)
- Muhimbili University of Health and Allied Sciences (Swahili: Chuo Kikuu cha Afya na Sayansi Shirikishi Muhimbili)
- Mzumbe University (Swahili: Chuo Kikuu cha Mzumbe)
- Open University of Tanzania (Swahili: Chuo Kikuu Huria Cha Tanzania)
- Sokoine University of Agriculture (Swahili: Chuo Kikuu cha Sokoine cha Kilimo)
- St. John's University of Tanzania (Swahili: Chuo Kikuu cha Mtakatifu Yohana Tanzania)
- St. Augustine University of Tanzania (Swahili: Chuo Kikuu cha Mtakatifu Agostino Tanzania)
- The State University of Zanzibar (Swahili: Chuo Kikuu cha Taifa cha Zanzibar)
- University of Dar es Salaam (Swahili: Chuo Kikuu cha Dar es Salaam)
- Zanzibar University (Swahili: Chuo Kikuu cha Zanzibar
  Arabic: جامعة زنجبار)

==== Trinidad and Tobago ====
- University of Trinidad and Tobago

==== Uganda ====
- Bugema University
- ISBAT University
- Islamic University in Uganda
- Kampala International University
- Kyambogo University
- Makerere University
- Mbarara University of Science and Technology
- Uganda Christian University
- Uganda Martyrs University

==== United Kingdom ====
- Bath Spa University
- Birkbeck, University of London
- Birmingham City University
- Bournemouth University
- Brunel University of London
- Buckinghamshire New University
- Canterbury Christ Church University
- Cardiff Metropolitan University (Welsh: Prifysgol Metropolitan Caerdydd)
- Cardiff University (Welsh: Prifysgol Caerdydd)
- City, University of London
- Coventry University
- Cranfield University
- Durham University
- Edge Hill University
- Edinburgh Napier University
- Glasgow Caledonian University
- Heriot-Watt University
- Keele University
- King's College London
- Kingston University
- Lancaster University
- Liverpool Hope University
- Liverpool John Moores University
- London School of Business and Management
- London South Bank University
- Middlesex University
- Newcastle University
- Northumbria University
- Oxford Brookes University
- Plymouth University
- Queen's University Belfast
- Royal Academy of Music
- Royal Central School of Speech and Drama
- School of Advanced Study, University of London
- School of Oriental and African Studies
- Sheffield Hallam University
- Staffordshire University
- Swansea University (Welsh: Prifysgol Abertawe)
- Courtauld Institute of Art
- The Institute of Cancer Research
- The Open University
- The University of Manchester
- The University of Northampton
- Ulster University
- University College Birmingham
- University College London
- University of Aberdeen
- University of Bath
- University of Birmingham
- University of Bristol
- University of Cambridge
- University of Chester
- University of Edinburgh
- University of Exeter
- University of Glasgow
- University of Greenwich
- University of Hull
- University of Kent
- University of Leeds
- University of Leicester
- University of Lincoln
- University of London
- University of Nottingham
- University of Oxford
- University of Reading
- University of Roehampton
- University of Salford
- University of Sheffield
- University of Southampton
- University of St Andrews
- University of Stirling
- University of Strathclyde
- University of Sunderland
- University of Surrey
- University of Sussex
- University of the Highlands and Islands (Scottish Gaelic: Oilthigh na Gàidhealtachd agus nan Eilean)
- University of the West of England
- University of the West of Scotland
- University of Wales (Welsh: Prifysgol Cymru)
- University of Warwick
- University of West London
- University of Winchester
- University of Wolverhampton
- University of Worcester
- University of York
- York St John University

==== Zambia ====
- Copperbelt University
- University of Lusaka
- University of Zambia
- Zambian Open University

==== Zimbabwe ====
- Africa University
- Bindura University of Science Education
- Midlands State University
- National University of Science and Technology
- Zimbabwe Open University

== Arms ==
Coat of arms of Association of Commonwealth Universities

Notes
Granted 20 June 1958.
Crest
On a wreath of the colours, a demi terrestrial globe Proper ensigned with an ancient lamp Argent garnished Or enflamed also Proper.
Escutcheon
Azure two wings conjoined in base Or surmounted of an open book Proper bound Gules edged Gold in chief a rose also Gules irradiated Or and charged with a rose Argent both roses barbed and seeded Proper.

== See also ==
- Agence universitaire de la Francophonie
