= Dwarkesh =

Dwarkesh may refer to:

- Dwarkesh Patel and his podcast, The Dwarkesh Podcast
- Dwarkesh law college
