= Rajpurohit (disambiguation) =

Rajpurohit is an Indian caste .

Rajpurohit is also a surname may also refer to:

- Govind Singh Rajpurohit, an Indian legal educational administrator
- Gulab Singh Rajpurohit, an Indian politician from the Bharatiya Janata Party
- Jethu Singh Rajpurohit, an Indian politician and member of the Indian National Congress from Bali, Rajasthan
- Shankar Singh Rajpurohit, an Indian politician from the Bharatiya Janata Party

== See also ==
- Purohita, family priest in Hinduism, including rajpurohit (royal priest)
