= UoK =

UoK or UOK may refer to:

- University of Kansas, USA
- University of Karachi, Pakistan
- University of Kent, England
- University of Kentucky, USA
- University of Kigali, Rwanda
- University of Kota, India
- University of Kufa, Iraq
- University of Kurdistan (Iran)
- University of Kashmir, India
- University of Oklahoma
