= Govind Singh Rajpurohit =

Indian legal education administrator

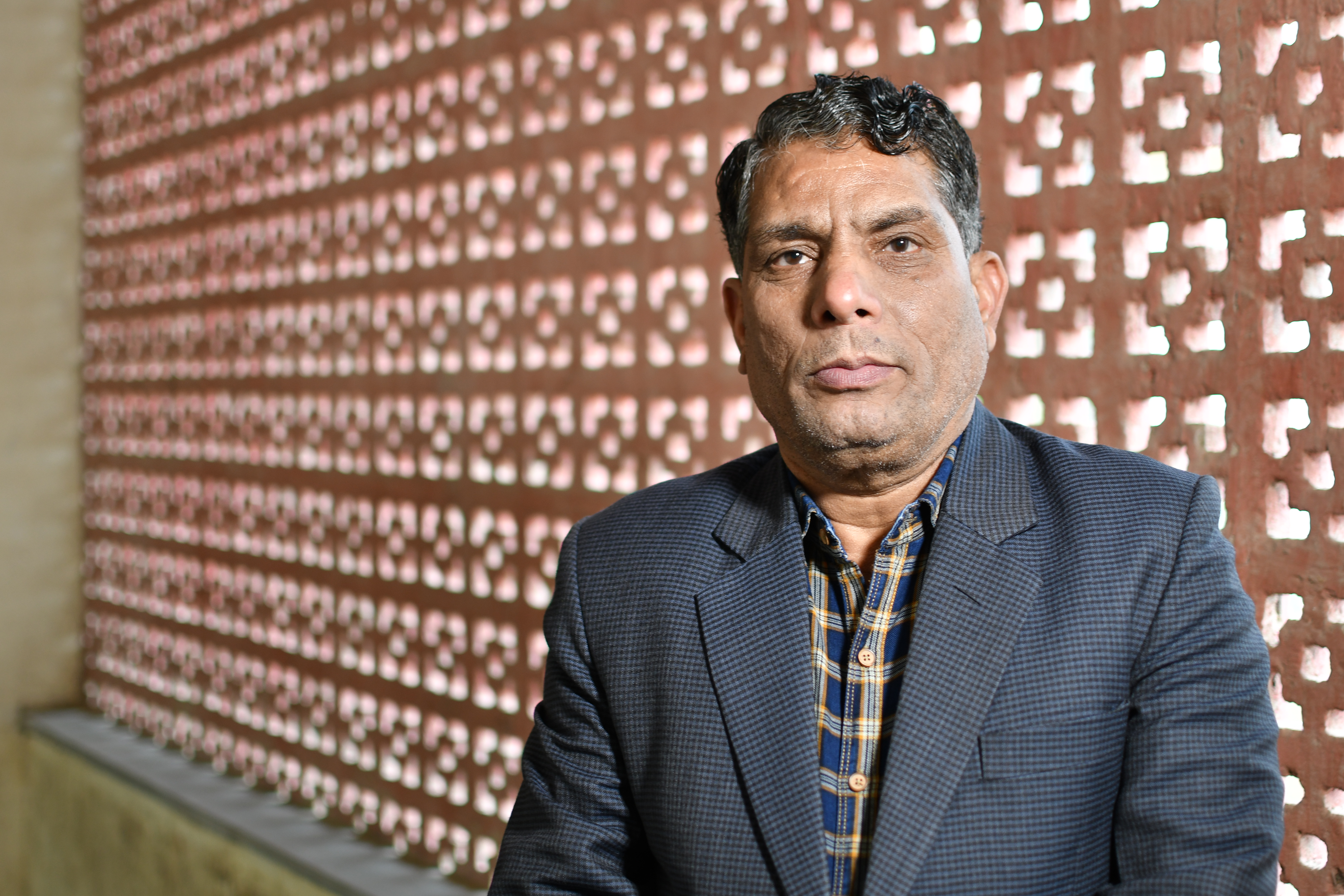
- Professor G. S. Rajpurohit

Head & Dean, Department of Law, University of Rajasthan, Jaipur

Formerly Dean Jagan Nath University, Jaipur, Rajasthan
- Incumbent
- Assumed office 2018, University of Rajasthan.

Personal details
- Children: Two
- Occupation: Head & Dean, Author
- Profession: Teaching, Administration

Govind Singh Rajpurohit is an Indian legal educational administrator. He is Head & Dean in Department of Law University of Rajasthan. He is alumni of University of Rajasthan. He has been distinguished invitees, Chief Guest, Guest of honor in various universities, member of various committees in UGC. He is also member of statutory body, General Council of National Law University, Jodhpur.

== Career ==
He started teaching in 1999 Baba Mungipa College of Law, Maharshi Dayanand Law College, Sanjay College of Law, S.S. Jain Subodh Law College. He previously worked as Head & Dean in Jagan Nath University, Jaipur, Rajasthan. He has restructured curriculum of various universities and organized seminars, conferences and moot courts. He has been associated with UGC, UPSC, various universities of India in various capacities. Ten books and 65 research papers and book reviews, and many treatise are to his credit. He is on the Board of editors of many national and international journals of repute and active member of various international professional bodies like.

== Research ==
He completed his Ph.D. in 2003. Numerous research papers are in his credit. He is in Editorial Advisory Board of Law Research Journals. He has guided many Ph.D. students.

== Books ==
- Sharma, Shatruhan; Rajpurohit, G. S; Sharma, Veena (2015). Intellectual Property Rights in Biotechnology Innovations. Lap Lambert Academic Publishing GmbH KG. ISBN 978-3-659-67371-9. OCLC 904818984.
- G.S. Rajpurohit (2015). Human Rights and International Law Practice (First ed.). Green Leaf Publication, Varanasi. ISBN 978-9385087097.
- G.S. Rajpurohit (2015). Law Related to International Trade (First ed.). Green Leaf Publication, Varanasi. ISBN 978-9385087141.
- G.S. Rajpurohit (2015). Dalit and Human Rights (First ed.). Green Leaf Publication, Varanasi. ISBN 978-9385086038.
- Rajpurohit, G. S (2016). Criminology: principles and concepts. Random Publications. ISBN 978-93-5111-907-4. OCLC 1029603624.
- Rajpurohit, G. S (2016). Crime and criminal justice in Asia. Random Publications. ISBN 978-93-5111-911-1. OCLC 1039077099.
- "Introduction to Law and Justice in Globalized World / 978-620-3-46469-6 / 9786203464696 / 6203464694". www.lap-publishing.com. Archived from the original on 15 May 2021.
- Singh, Dr Govind Singh Rajpurohit & Abhimanyu (19 July 2021). Crimes against Children in India - Preventive and Protective Laws. ASIN 939067395X.
- Criminal law reforms in India: recent issues and challenges. Shandilya Publications. 2021. ISBN 978-81-953270-8-9. OCLC 1275365178.
- Singh Rajpurohit, Govind. Transgender Rights in India. ISBN 978-620-3-85588-3. OCLC 1259349102.
