= Sudhanshu Sharma =

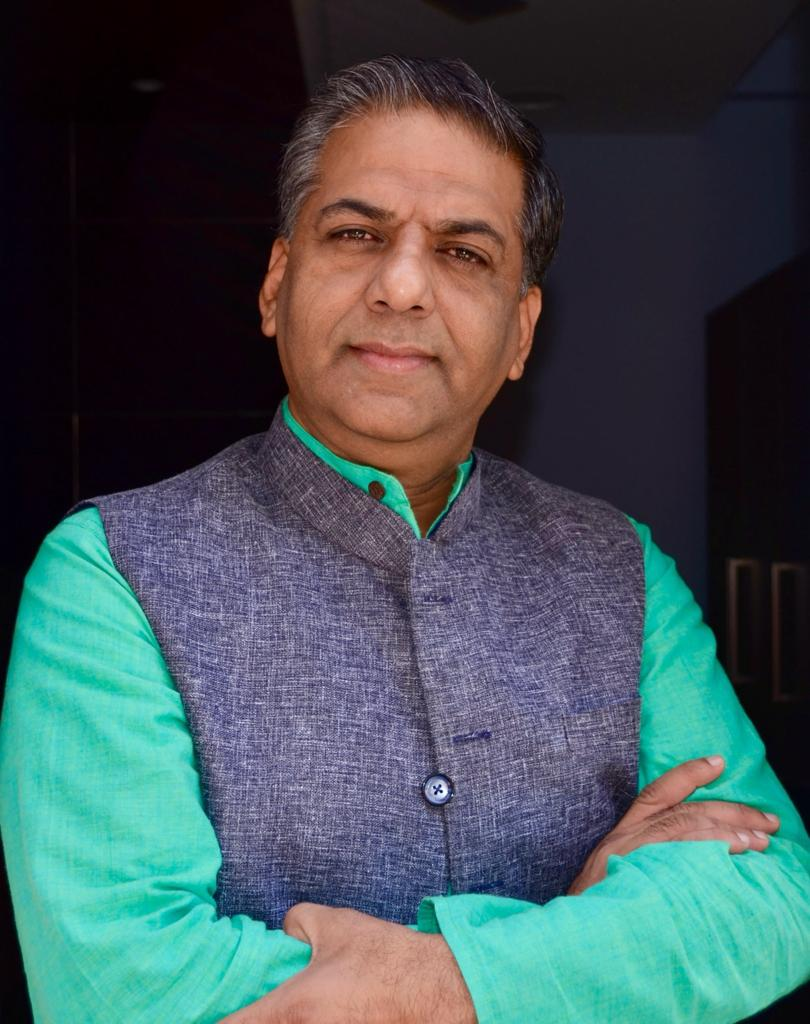
- Born: 19 February 1969 (age 57)
- Known for: Suresh Gyan Vihar University (co-founder)
- Awards: Eminent Environmental Scientist Award (UNICEF)

Sudhanshu Sharma (born 19 February 1969) referred to as Dr. Sudhanshu is an Indian educationist, politician, green activist, and climate change scientist. He is the co-founder of Suresh Gyan Vihar University, amongst NAAC 'A' graded universities in Rajasthan. He has also served as founder vice-chancellor of Suresh Gyan Vihar University during 2008–2010. In 2011, he founded the Indian Peoples Green Party a political movement based in Rajasthan and serves as its National President. The party is associated with the think-tank Naya Rajasthan and advocates the formation of peoplegreen sector. He is also the author of "Indians@rest: The root cause of India's unrest", satire on Indian political system. He is also the host of The Green Talks with Dr. Sudhanshu, an online political satire vlog. He is the director of Centre of Climate Change and Water as well as Centre for Sustainable Development Goals at SGVU. The centre organises an annual 'C3W: Convention on climate change and water' since 2011 in the city of Jaipur. He was awarded the Eminent Environmental Scientist Award during the 33rd World Environment Congress, New Delhi, India by the International Association of Educators for word peace, an organisation affiliated by UNICEF.

== Life ==
Born in a Jaipur based family of generational educationists. He is grandson of Acharya Purushottam Uttam, a great academic of pre and post-independence era. He founded the Sahitya Sadawart Samiti, Jaipur. Dr.Sudhanshu's father Shri Suresh Sharma was an eminent politician of Rajasthan, recognised as a senior leader of Congress Party, known as the 'Voice of downtroddens'. His uncle Shri Sunil Sharma, a co-founder of Suresh Gyan Vihar University, is an academic and versatile historian. Dr.Sudhanshu began his career as a researcher in geology and got his Doctorate in 1992 in Earth Sciences from MREC, Jaipur (now MNIT). His research was on thermal metamorphism of precambrian rocks of Arawali's at Rajasthan. At the age of 22, he reported two minerals i.e. Staurolite and Ottrelite first time in said region. He also described genesis of these minerals through his micro-probe study. He was also awarded a Law Degree from University of Rajasthan.

== Suresh Gyan Vihar University ==
Suresh Gyan Vihar University (SGVU) is a not-for-profit autonomous private university located in Jaipur, Rajasthan, India. Gyan Vihar University was established by Government of Rajasthan vide Act No. 16 of 2008, passed in state Assembly of Rajasthan. The university runs academic as well research programs in variety of subjects including engineering, pharmacy, management, education, hotel management, humanities and sciences. There are 10 research centre at the university focussed on topics varying from climate change, sustainable technologies, entrepreneurship, democratic reforms as well as agriculture.

== Naya Rajasthan ==
Founded in 2011, the think-tank has various academics, journalists, politician, industrialists as members. The think-tank acts as pressure group towards establishing green-sustainable growth, accountable governance, least interference of government in the life of public, human parity and dignity, equal opportunities and entrepreneurial acceleration.

"Indians@rest: The root cause of India's unrest" by Dr.Sudhanshu, asserts on several solutions that think-tank proposes. The book contains analysis of the economic, socio-political and external factors throughout the history that are the reasons for the present conditions of the nation. The book was published by Partridge Publication, a collaborated venture of Penguin Books.

== Indian Peoples Green Party ==
Peoples Green Party is an unrecognised registered political party of India that participates in panchayat, zila and state level elections in Rajasthan. Founded in 2011, Peoples Green Party, headquartered in Jaipur, was formed as a "stand for equality" amongst the populace of Rajasthan. The aim was to create a platform to give voice and support to underprivileged sections of society that are unable to raise voice and fight for elections in the current paradigm of Indian democracy. The party itself has a democratic system, Janta ka morcha, through which its candidates are elected by votes from members. As a way to fight against patriarchy, casteism and classism, PGP supports members from different strata of society including women, dalits, adivasis, poor as well as social entrepreneurs, and helps them spread awareness for their campaign. Most of the campaigns are crowd-funded and accepted in small donations. Through the years, PGP has been the highest crowd-funded unrecognised political party in Rajasthan.

The party has various associated trade unions including Peoples Green Unorganised Shramik Union, Bharitya Jan Samridhi Hat-karobari Sanghathan, Rajasthan Vahan Chalak Sangh, Indian Delivery Lions organisation. All these organisations work under the Alakh program across Rajasthan. As part of the Alakh program, these organisations aim to support small scale entrepreneurship, skilled and unskilled labor by formation of thousands of self-help groups. The primary aim is the creation of a support structure through which skilling, capital, guidance can be provided as well as small-scale businesses can be promoted.
