= Newai =

Newai (Niwai) Niwai, Banasthali Niwai
- Town

- Location in Rajasthan, India Newai (Niwai) (India)
- Coordinates: 26°21′34.976″N 75°55′37.412″E
- Country: India
- State: Rajasthan
- District: Tonk
- Established: 25 March 1948

Population (2011)
  - Total: 45,787
- Demonym: Rajasthani

Languages
  - Official: Hindi
  - Other: Rajasthani
- Time zone: UTC+5:30 (IST)
- Postal code: 304021
- Telephone code: 01438
- ISO 3166 code: RJ-IN
- Vehicle registration: RJ-26
- Website: https://newai.in

Newai or Niwai is a town, and a municipality and tehsil in Tonk district in the Indian state of Rajasthan. The Tonk district is bounded in the north by Jaipur district, in the east by Sawai Madhopur district, in the southeast by Kota district, in the south by Bundi district, in the southwest by Bhilwara district, and in the west by Ajmer district. Jaipur, capital of Rajasthan is the closest major city to Newai.

== Demographics ==
As of 2011 India census, Niwai had a population of 45,787. Males constitute 50.30% of the population and females 49.70%. Jaipur, the Pink city and Capital of Rajasthan is just 70 km (43 mi) away from Newai, Newai is a Tehsil Headquarter of District Tonk. Newai is surrounded by major districts such as Jaipur, Tonk, Sawai Madhopur and Ajmer.

== Attractions ==
The town is bordered by scenic Raktanchal Parvat on one side. There are sand dunes and plain desert on opposite side of this hill which attracts people during rainy season. On 29 July 2015, an idol (dating 1316 Samvat) of Lord Mahavira, 24th Jain Tirthankara has been found while digging the sand there. Newai is known as "Dharma Nagri" and is very peaceful. Devnarayan Bhagawan's temple Jodhpuriya is located here. Bhagawan Devnarayan was son of king Sri Sawai Bhoj Gurjar (one of the 24 brave Gurjar brothers known as Bagaravat) and Saadu Maata Gurjari. Town's peaceful environment attracts many old sadhus who are living here at various temples and ashrams. Newai has many temples and worship places of Hindu and Jain religion. In Newai, more than half of the population follows the Jain religion. There are various holy places which have unique importance for an individual clan. Among many such places, holy "Sati Mata place" is situated in foothills of "Ractanchal". This is also known as "Lada Chatri" among the local people. Devotees and followers from around the country visit this place to present offerings after their wishes get fulfilled or after any auspicious ceremony in the family e.g. marriage or child birth. Shivaji Park, hot and cold water springs, and Mashi Dam are some of other attractions in the town. Annual Dussehra festival is organised which is attended by people from the town and surrounding villages. Banasthali Vidyapith, a popular girls' university and Dr. K.N.Modi University are located there.

Newai is a commercial and industrial town housing various small and medium-scale industries and factories specifically in the domain of edible vegetable oils which are transported all over the country. A popular comedian of the 18th century named DevRaj Singh Tanwar was born there. The residents of Newai are quite affable and accommodating which shows the sweetness of Rajasthani culture in their demeanor.

Newai is also known for fairs in Newai like Dussehera mela, Nrisingh Janmotsav, Shyam Patotsav, Janmashtami, Jain Chaturmasas and many more.

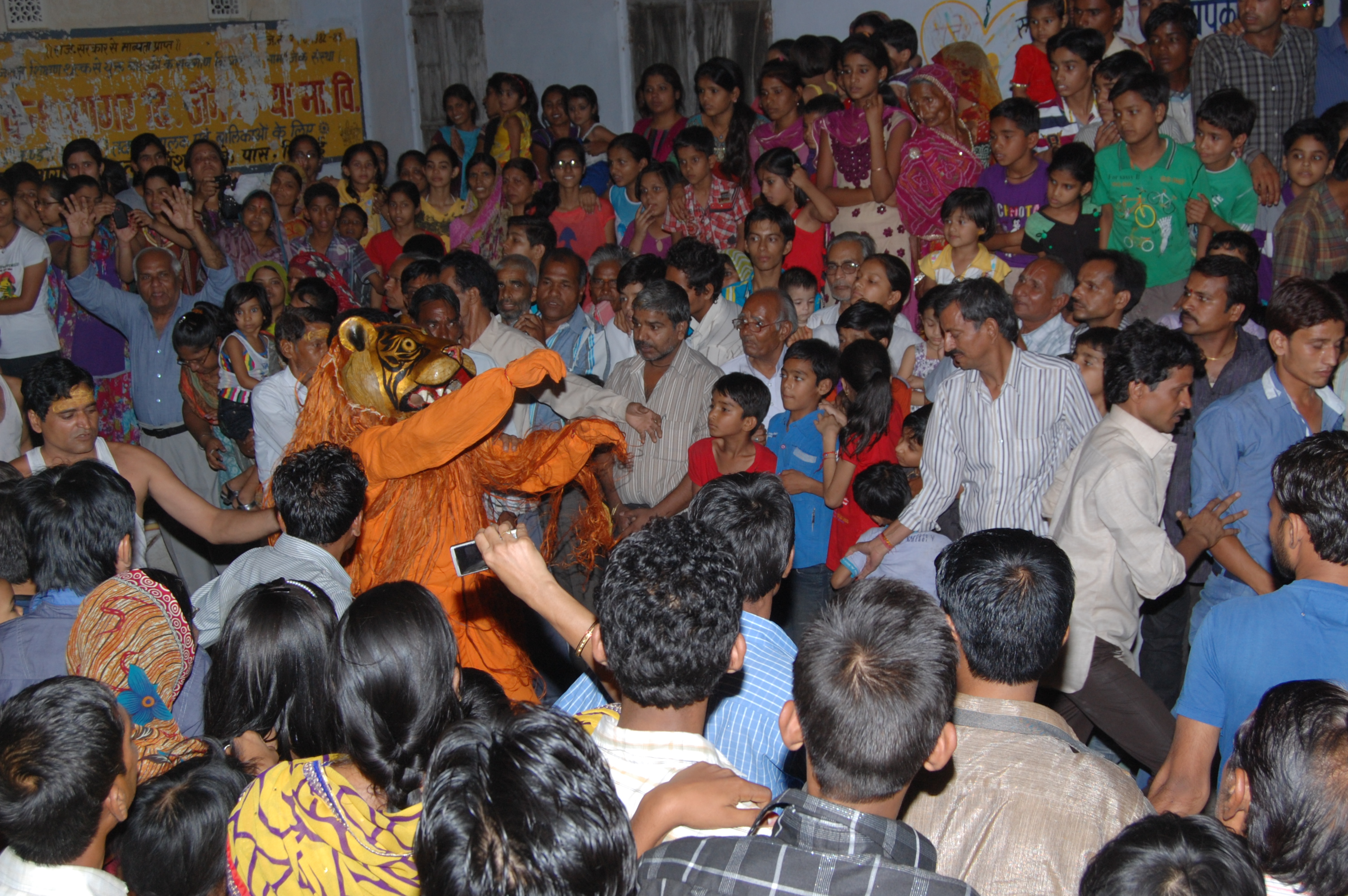
Nrisingh Janmotsav in Nayamandir (Newai) Newaiनयामंदिर_(निवाई)

Every year, the Dashhara Fair celebrates here on a big level and then after Kota, the biggest statue of 'Ravan' was created here.

Hariyali Amawas Fair: Behind of Raktanchal Mountain.

Important tourist places: - 1). Dev Dham Jodhpuria - A huge temple of Devnarayan ji, the deity of Rajasthan and famous folk god of Gurjars. Every year a fair is filled on Bhadrapada Shukla 4.

2) Shyam Temple Niwai is another branch of Khatu Shyam Temple of Sikar. The temple is famous in this area due to its large size and popular artwork. Here large events are held on Janmastami and Holi.

3) Temple of Jalandharnath - Vaishnavism was established in South India. It was here that Guru Gorakhnath Niwai, a spokesman of the Vaishnava sect came. He ran this cult behind the 'Raktanchal' mountain. The temple of Jalandharnath is really worth seeing here, which is situated between the stones of stones.

4). Rairh - Located at a short distance from Niwai, the Rairh Civilization where there were 3075 silver coins found along the river Dheel. Therefore, this place was called Tatanagar of ancient India. This civilization is 4000 years old.

5). Shivaji Park: This is the most attractive place of Niwai which attracts tourists with its beauty. It is built on the lines of Shivji Park in Mumbai. Here also a large stone idol of Maratha ruler Shivaji is installed.

6). Patel Haveli - 25 km (16 mi) from Niwai at a place called Piplu.

7). Budhala Balaji: A huge temple situated in the jungles of Rajwas village, 10 km from Niwai, known for its historical place. There are thousands of years old stone rocks here. The Hanuman temple here is quite famous, until today it is not possible to know where this statue came from. Remains of a 2500 year old civilization have been found in this village, which was called Narasimha's Kund Rajwas.

== Hospitals ==
- MAA Vishudh Physiotherapy clinic
- Community Health Center
- RK EYE AND GENERAL HOSPITAL
- Shree Vardhman Dental Clinic
- Ojha Hospital
- Shri Rameshwar prasad memorial hospital
- Namokar Hospital
- Kalyan Hospital
- Sun Drop Eye Hospital and Feko Surgery Center
- MCM Surgical Hospital
- Rajawat Nursing Home and Research Center
- Daduram Hospital

== Transport ==
- By rail

Banasthali Newai Railway Station is the major railway station of Newai and Tonk where almost 30 Super fast, Express and local trains have their halts. The distance from Newai to Jaipur Junction is 70 km (43 mi).

- By road

Newai is located at Jaipur-Kota National Highway NH12 at the 70 km (43 mi) milestone from Jaipur.

- By air

Jaipur International Airport is 55 km from Newai via NH12

== Schools In Newai ==
- Govt. Senior Secondary School
- Dr. K. N. Modi Global School
- Government Senior Secondary School Rajwas
