= B. L. Verma =

Indian education administrator

Personal details
- Occupation: Professor, Vice-Chancellor
- Profession: Teaching, Administration

B. L. Verma is an Indian education administrator. He is the founder Vice Chancellor of University of Kota, Rajasthan. He joined University of Kota on 25 August 2003. He is Chairman of Vidysthali Public School.
