= Dev Swarup =

Indian academic

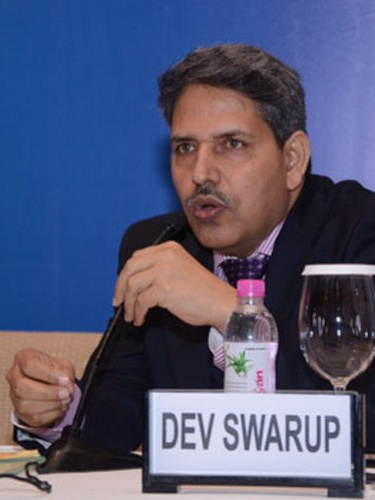
- Born: 10 January; Agra, Uttar Pradesh
- Occupations: Educational Administrator, Vice Chancellor
- Years active: 1990 – present

Dev Swarup is an Indian educational administrator. He is founding Vice-chancellor of The Baba Amte Divyang University, Jaipur, Rajasthan.

== Career ==
- He has been the founding vice-chancellor of Dr. Bhimrao Ambedkar Law University, Jaipur.
- He has additionally held responsibility for Haridev Joshi University of Journalism and Mass Communication and Vishwakarma Skill University, Jaipur.
- He has also been additional secretary (2019-2020) of University Grants Commission (India) and joint secretary, UGC, New Delhi (2006-2013 & 2014-2019).
- He was vice-chancellor of the University of Rajasthan, from 2013-14. He resigned from the University of Rajasthan in November 2014.
- He is also a member of the statutory body, the General Council of National Law University, Jodhpur.

== Research ==
In the year 1990 Ph.D. was awarded on "An Evaluative Study of the Working of Institutional and Non-Institutional Welfare Agencies engaged in Child and Women Welfare in Agra Division" and in the year 2000 D.Litt. research degree was awarded on "The Impact of Development Programme on Scheduled Caste Career Women and their level of participation (A Study in Agra Town) from the Institute of Social Sciences, Dr. Bhimrao Ambedkar University, Agra.

== Contribution ==
He has contributed a lot in maintaining the standard of higher education in India. In capacity of additional secretary he has asked the Vice Chancellors of Indian Universities to implement the EWS-Economic weaker section quota. He has been member of various committees to probe the matter related to fake degrees.

- He has removed anomalies in appointment of teachers in colleges and universities as an Indian education administrator.
- Implement reservation in Ph.D. admissions.

== Books ==
He has written many research articles and his contribution has been acknowledged at many places by the autonomous bodies.

- In 2019, Co-Authored UGC’s Publications, "Governance in Higher Education: Hand Book for Vice Chancellors".
- Swarup, Dev (2023). Caste, Gender and Development (First ed.). Rajasthan: Rawat Publications, Jaipur. ISBN 9788131613146.
