= JECRC University =

Private university in Jaipur, India

Coordinates: 26.7759236°N 75.8745013°E

- Other name: JU
- Motto: Build Your World
- Type: Private
- Established: 2012; 14 years ago
- Academic affiliations: UGC, AICTE, BCI
- Chairperson: O. P. Agrawal
- President: Victor Gambhir
- Location: Plot No. IS-2036 to IS-2039, Ramchandrapura Industrial Area, Vidhani, Sitapura Extension, Jaipur-303905, Rajasthan, India, Jaipur, Rajasthan, 303905, India
- Campus: 32 acres (13 ha); Urban
- Colors: Red, White
- Website: jecrcuniversity.edu.in

JECRC University (formerly Jaipur Engineering College & Research Centre) is a private university located in Jaipur, Rajasthan, India.

== Academics and Research ==
JECRC University offers several undergraduate and postgraduate-level courses and PhD programmes in science and technology, arts, commerce, health and medicine, law, etc.

Each Academic Department in JECRC University has a Research Lab to facilitate the students to carry out research. A special Research Task Force (RTF) of faculty members has been created.

An amount of 16 crore rupees is received as a Research Grants from Government/ Non-Government Agencies.

Some of the key Grants/ Projects awarded by the Government Agencies:

- JU Women Technology Park Sanctioned by DST, GOI
- Impact of Gender Mainstreaming Projects of Government of India
- JU – Biotechnology Business Incubator by DST, Rajasthan
- DST DAAD 2019 Indo German Joint Collaboration funded by DST, GOI
- Green Chemistry Frontiers funded by DST, GOI Prof. Sanjay
- ISRO Exhibition under auspices of DST, GOI
- TIDE by MeitY, GoI
- Science, Technology and Innovation Hub by DST, Govt. of India, New Delhi
- Promotion of European and International cooperation in science and research
- Startup India Seed Fund Scheme (SISFS) 2022–2023
- Ministry of Electronics and Information Technology (MeitY) Startup funding for budding entrepreneurs
- NNK Rank 1 out of 157 participants in 2022 for Research and Development.

== Ranking ==
The World Rank of JECRC University is 408 in Top Mathematics Universities and all India rank is 07 by Research.com in 2022.

All India Rank 15 among 500+ colleges, and Zonal Rank 03 out of 127 colleges by Internshala Annual Rankings 2022.

The Week-Hansa Research Survey 2022 – India's Best Universities – Emerging Multidisciplinary Universities – ALL INDIA Rank 09.

== Incidents ==
On 1 January 2024, two students of JECRC were killed in a hit and run case by unidentified speeding vehicle while crossing the road at night near Hotel Highway King. Both students were initially rushed to SMS hospital. The case was registered in Shyam Nagar Police station of Jaipur.

== See also ==
- List of institutions of higher education in Rajasthan
