= Dwarkesh Patel =

Author and podcast host (born 2000)

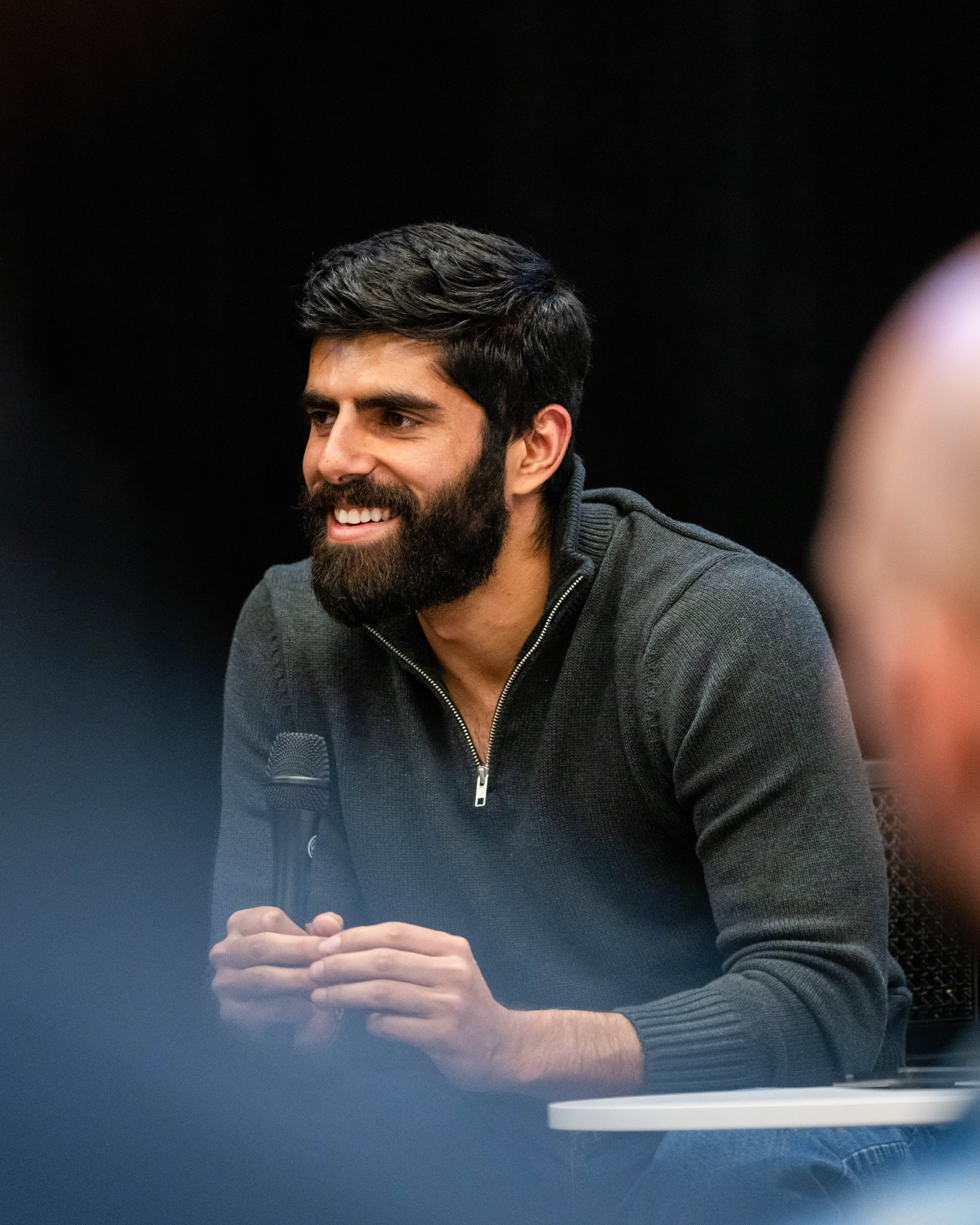
- Patel in 2026
- Born: August 19, 2000 (age 26); Vadodara, Gujarat, India
- Education: University of Texas, Austin (BS)
- Occupation: Podcast host
- Known for: Dwarkesh Podcast
- Website: www.dwarkesh.com

Dwarkesh Patel (born August 19, 2000) is a Indian-born writer and podcaster based in the United States. He currently hosts the long-form interview show Dwarkesh Podcast, which focuses on artificial intelligence, science, and history.

== Early life ==
Patel was born in Vadodara, Gujarat, India, and moved to the United States when he was 8 years old. His father, a physician, frequently traveled for work. The family moved around the country, living in North Dakota, West Virginia, Maryland, and Texas. While studying computer science at the University of Texas at Austin, Patel began interviewing writers and technologists in 2020 for an early version of his podcast, then called The Lunar Society. He took the podcast's name from the Lunar Society of Birmingham, an 18th-century British dinner club that was part of an influential intellectual movement known as the Midlands Enlightenment.

== Career ==
The Dwarkesh Podcast features extended conversations with scientists, technology leaders, historians, and economists. On the podcast, Patel has interviewed prominent and diverse figures, including AI researchers such as Andrej Karpathy and Ilya Sutskever, technology leaders such as Mark Zuckerberg, Elon Musk and Satya Nadella, and political figures, including former British prime minister Tony Blair and former British political advisor Dominic Cummings.

The podcast has received praise from journalists and technologists. The Economist said in 2025 that Patel "rose from nowhere to become Silicon Valley’s favourite podcaster". The New Yorker referred to the significance of the podcast as "to the doomer crowd what 'The Joe Rogan Experience' is to jujitsu bros, or what 'The Ezra Klein Show' is to Park Slope liberals".

Patel is particularly interested in artificial intelligence, which he considers to be "the most multidisciplinary and intellectually stimulating topic." He was listed as one of the 100 most influential people in AI by Time in 2024. Patel identifies as "adjacent to the (LessWrong) rationalist community" which shares his concerns about an imminent Technological Singularity.

Patel is the co-author, with Gavin Leech, of the 2025 book The Scaling Era: An Oral History of AI, 2019-2025. The book is mostly composed of parts of interviews from the Dwarkesh Podcast conducted with those involved in contemporary AI research, including Dario Amodei, Demis Hassabis, Mark Zuckerberg, and Leopold Aschenbrenner. Subjects explored include the training of AI models, including the cost of the data centers required to train larger models, the impact on business, scientific research, and AI's potential impact on geopolitics, exploring the ways AI can potentially be used by adversarial countries to attack others, with Aschenbrenner offering an hypothetical scenario of a country with a slight edge using small drones to destroy the nuclear submarines of its enemies. Some interviewed like Amodei and Aschenbrenner openly describe the inability of humans to comprehend the underpinnings and intentions of AI, particularly artificial superintelligence, with Amodei, while discussing AI alignment and AI interpretability, stating "We really have very little idea what we’re talking about." Aschenbrenner further explains the uncertainly, stating that in the millions of lines of code, "you don’t know if it's hacking, exfiltrating itself, or trying to go for the nukes."

In August 2025, Patel organized a fundraiser for charities opposing factory farming. Patel pledged to donate up to $250,000 in matching funds. He and his listeners (including Patrick Collison, Liv Boeree and economics blogger Noah Smith) raised over $2 million. Like AI risk, animal welfare is a popular cause in the rationalist/effective altruist community.

== Personal life ==
As of 2024, Patel lives in San Francisco. He has stated that he obtained his U.S. green card shortly before reaching the maximum age allowed for child-status eligibility.
