= Banasthali Niwai railway station =

Railway station in Rajasthan, India

Banasthali Niwai

General information
- Location: Banasthali Niwai, Tonk district, Rajasthan; India
- Coordinates: 26.383888°N 75.935384°E
- System: Indian Railways station
- Owner: Indian Railways
- Operator: North Western Railway
- Line: Jaipur–Sawai Madhopur line
- Platforms: 2
- Tracks: 3

Construction
- Structure type: Standard (on ground station)
- Parking: Yes

Other information
- Status: Functioning
- Station code: BNLW
- Zone(s): North Western Railway
- Division(s): Jaipur

Passengers
- 800-1000 par days
Location
- Location within India Location within Rajasthan

Banasthali Niwai railway station is a railway station in Tonk district, Rajasthan. Its code is BNLW. It serves Banasthali Niwai. The station consists of 2 platforms. Passenger, Express and Superfast trains halt here.
