= Internshala =

Indian online training platform

- Company type: Private, Employment website
- Industry: Education, Employment
- Founder: Sarvesh Agrawal
- Headquarters: Gurgaon, India
- Services: Internship matching, online training
- Website: internshala.com

Internshala is an internship and online training platform, based in Gurgaon, India. Founded by Sarvesh Agrawal, an IIT Madras alumnus, in 2011, the website helps students find internships with organisations in India.

== History ==
The platform, which was founded in 2010, started out as a WordPress blog that aggregated internships across India and articles on education, technology and skill gap. Internshala launched its online trainings in 2014. As of 2018, the platform had 3.5 million students and 80,000 companies.

== Partnerships ==
In August 2016, Telangana's not-for-profit organisation, Telangana Academy for Skill and Knowledge (TASK) partnered with Internshala to help students with internship resources and career services.

In September 2016, Team Indus, Google XPRIZE shortlisted entity has partnered with Internshala for college outreach for its initiative, Lab2Moon.

== Awards and recognition ==
In 2011, the website became a part of NASSCOM 10K Startups. In 2015, Internshala was a finalist in People Matters TechHR 2015 Spotlight Awards under 'Futurism in Recruitment' category.
