= Homoeopathy University =

University in India

- Type: Private
- Established: 2010
- Chairman: K. C. Bhinda
- President: Dr. A. N. Mathur
- Undergraduates: BHMS - 100 seats
- Postgraduates: MD (Hom) - 34 Seats
- Location: Jaipur, Rajasthan, India; 26°46′51″N 75°46′33″E
- Website: www.homoeopathyuniversity.org
- Location within Rajasthan Location within India

Homoeopathy University is a private university located in Jaipur, Rajasthan, India. It was founded in 2010.

== Establishment ==
Homoeopathy University(Recognized by UGC u/s 2(f) of UGC Act 1956) is established by Dr. M.P.K.Homoeopathic Medical College, Hospital & Research Centre Society, Jaipur. The Ordinance of University has been approved by His Excellency Governor of Rajasthan vide their Ordinance No.5 of 2009 on 13-10-2009. The bill of University has been raised in state assembly by the Government and legally accepted through the legislature on 3 April 2010.
