= Vivekananda Global University =

Private University in Rajasthan

- Type: Private University
- Established: 2012
- Affiliations: UGC
- Chairperson: Dr. Lalit K. Panwar, IAS (Retd.)
- President: Dr. N. D. Mathur
- Location: Jaipur, Rajasthan, India
- Campus: urban, 35 acres in area
- Colors: Red, white
- Nickname: VGU
- Website: www.vgu.ac.in

Vivekananda Global University is a private university located in Jaipur, Rajasthan in India. It was established under the Act No.11/2012 of the Government of Rajasthan.

VGU is recognised by All India Council for Technical Education, Bar Council of India, Association of Indian Universities, University Grants Commission (UGC) New Delhi, Council of Architecture, Ministry of Skill Development and Entrepreneurship, Ministry of Rural Development and Pharmacy Council of India.

== About ==
The university was founded in 2012 by the Bagaria Education Trust. With accreditations such as NAAC Grade A+, QS World University Rankings - Asia 2025 (Band 681–700), and ICAR, the university is recognized as one of the fastest-growing and leading educational institutions in the country.

== Recognitions ==
Vivekananda Global University has achieved accreditations such as NAAC Grade A+, QS World University Rankings - Asia 2025 (Band 681-700), and ICAR.

Accreditations

- National Assessment and Accreditation Council (NAAC) A+
- Indian Council of Agricultural Research (ICAR)

Collaborations At Vivekananda Global University, Jaipur

- Edinburgh Napier University
- Swansea University
- University of Wolverhampton
- Tennessee State University
- Leland Stanford Junior University

== Academic programs ==
The university offers bachelor's, master's, engineering diploma programs, and doctoral degrees. The engineering and diploma programs are offered under the Faculty of Engineering & Technology.

=== B.Tech. programs ===
B.Tech programs are offered in the following disciplines:

- Civil engineering
- Computer science
- Electrical engineering
- Electronics & communication engineering
- Mechanical engineering

The engineering programs have three below options which can be chosen by the students:

- Dual degree/ twinning program with either Edinburgh Napier University or Swansea University through which students can complete seven semesters of the course in the university campus and can move to any of those two universities for the last semester of the course
- Integrated B.Tech. +M.Tech.
- Industrial internship – The students are allowed to do a full-time six-month internship during the last semester of the course.

=== Other UG programs ===
- B.Sc.(physics, chemistry, maths, information technology, botany, zoology)
- B.Sc. (Hons.) in (physics, maths, chemistry, botany)
- B.Sc.(H) in agriculture, agro business management
- B.Arch.
- B.Tech. CSE (computer science & engineering)
- B.Tech. CSE specialization AI & ML (artificial intelligence & machine learning)
- B.Tech. CSE specialization AI & DS (artificial intelligence & data science)
- B.Des. - fashion design, interior design, lifestyle design, visual communication
- BBA- BBA, BBA+LLB
- B.Com.
- BCA
- B.A.- BA, BA+LLB
- B.Sc. Optometry

=== M.Tech. courses ===
M.Tech. programs are offered in the following disciplines:

- Civil engineering
- Computer science engineering

=== M.Sc. programs ===
- Physics
- Mathematics
- Chemistry
- Botany
- Zoology
- Agronomy

=== MBA ===
- HR
- Marketing
- Finance
- ABM
- International accounting
- Entrepreneurship
- Healthcare management
- operations management

=== Research programs ===
Vivekananda Global University, Jaipur, offers Ph.D. programs in the following streams.

- Sciences (physics, chemistry, mathematics)
- Engineering

=== Diploma programs ===
Diploma programs are offered in the following disciplines:

- Civil engineering
- Computer science
- Electrical engineering
- Mechanical engineering
- Pharmacy
- Humanities
- Management

== Student fests ==
The university conducts annual fests where students across the city join into the celebrations. PANACHE is the annual fest that is conducted annually has more than 5000 students visiting the campus. The three-day fest includes cultural, sporting, and other events which students and faculty participate in.

== Constituent colleges ==
- Center for design excellence (CODE VGU)
- Global centre for entrepreneurship and commerce [GCEC]

== See also ==
- List of institutions of higher education in Rajasthan
