= Geetanjali Medical College =

Medical college in Rajsthan, India

Coordinates: 24.5544515°N 73.7330058°E

Geetanjali Medical College and Hospital
- Type: Private medical college
- Established: 2008
- Affiliations: Geetanjali University
- Dean: Dr. Sangita Gupta
- Undergraduates: 750
- Location: GMCH, Eklingpura, Manwakhera Udaipur, India, 313002, Udaipur, Rajasthan, India
- Website: geetanjaliuniversity.com

Geetanjali Medical College is a private medical college located in the city of Udaipur, Rajasthan.The college is attached to the Geetanjali Hospital which is a 1150 bedded tertiary care hospital . The batches up to 2011 are affiliated to the Rajasthan University of Health Sciences which conducts the examinations. Batches 2012 and onwards are affiliated to the Geetanjali University, which was established in 2011 covering an area of 25 acres

== Courses Offered ==
Geetanjali Medical College offers Diploma and graduate courses and Doctorate Programmes.
