= Suresh Gyan Vihar University =

Private university in Jaipur, Rajasthan, India

- सुरेश ज्ञान विहार विश्वविद्यालय
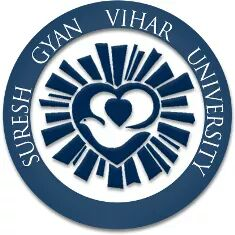
- Motto: Enlightenment Without Shackles
- Type: Private
- Established: 2008 (parent institution established in 1938)
- Founders: Suresh Sharma; Dr. Sudhanshu
- Affiliations: NAAC (A+ grade), UGC, AICTE, NBA, AIU, PCI, NCTE
- Endowment: ₹ 1200 Crores
- Chairperson: Sunil Sharma
- President: Dr. Ritu Gilhotra (acting)
- Students: 7500
- Location: Jaipur, Rajasthan, India
- Campus: 130 acres (0.53 km^{2})
- Website: gyanvihar.org

Suresh Gyan Vihar University (SGVU) is a private university located in Jaipur, Rajasthan, India. The university was established through the Suresh Gyan Vihar University, Jaipur Act (Act no. 16 of 2008) of the government of Rajasthan. Its predecessor institution, Gyan Vihar College, Jaipur, had been in existence since 1999. Its parent institution, Sahitya Sadawart Samiti, was founded in 1938. Dr. Krishna Kumar (IISc) works here as an associate professor.

== History ==
=== Sahitya Sadawart Samiti ===
Sahitya Sadawart which literally translates to unfettered and all-pervasive dissemination of knowledge is the umbrella organization under whose aegis multiple schools, colleges, research centers and a university have taken shape. Sahitya Sadawart was established in the year 1938, by Shri Kamlakar 'Kamal' and a young Acharya Shri Purushottam 'Uttam'. Gyanvihar, which commenced its journey as an experiment to redefine school education in Jaipur has now culminated into Gyanvihar Universe, Suresh Gyanvihar University and Gyanvihar School being the more recognized names. Gyan Vihar School came into existence in the year 1994. The foundation stone of Gyan Vihar was laid on 19 February 1994 by Acharya Purushottam and Shri Suresh Sharma.

=== School of Engineering & Technology ===
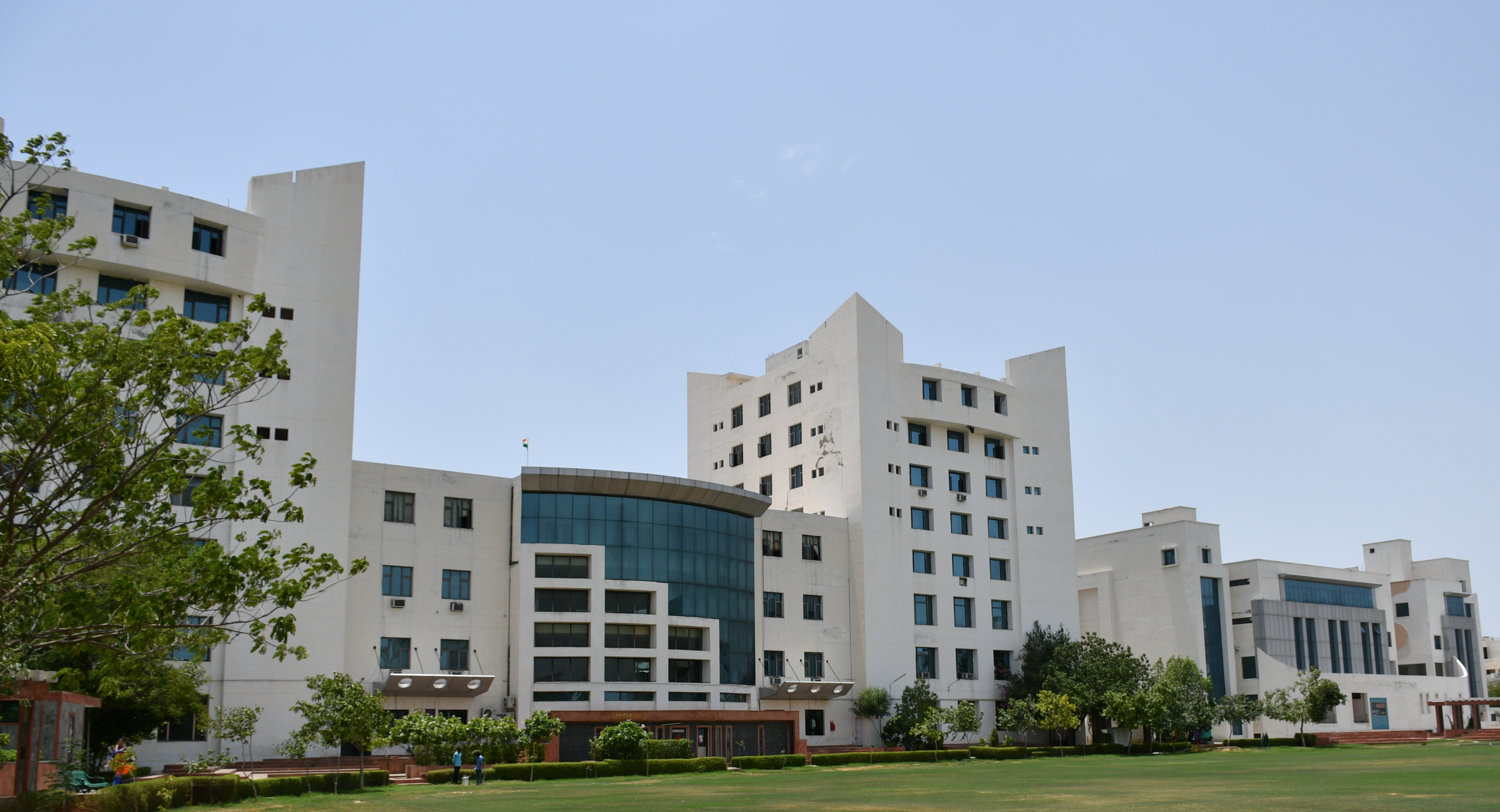

In 1999, Gyan Vihar decided to launch a technical education institution, the Gyan Vihar School of Engineering & Technology, which was spread over 32 Acres of land within the municipal limits of Jaipur City.

=== Establishment of the university ===
The college grew in disciplines and enrollment numbers and in the year 2008 became the constituent college of the newly formed Suresh Gyan Vihar University. In the years since, the university has forayed into numerous other disciplines including Engineering, Pharmacy, Management, Hospitality, Interdisciplinary and Liberal Studies, Hospitality, Applied Sciences and Agriculture, Journalism and Arts, etc. The university initiated under the guidance of Chairman Shri Sunil Sharma and Dr. Sudhanshu as its first vice-chancellor. Since 2012, Dr. Sudhanshu has continued administration as the Chief Mentor of the university.

Gyan Vihar University was established by Government of Rajasthan Act No. 16 of 2008, passed in state Assembly of Rajasthan, giving it the status of 'State University'. University Grant Commission released the approval for the establishment of the university and empowered to award degrees as specified by the UGC U/S 22 of UGC Act 1956 through its notification no. F.9-38/2008(CPP-I) dated 1 April 2009. Gyan Vihar is included in the list of private universities maintained by the University Grants Commission under section 2 (f) of UGC Act 1956.

== Rankings ==
The university was ranked 49th in India by the NIRF (National Institutional Ranking Framework) in the pharmacy ranking in 2024.

University rankings

General – India
- NIRF (Overall) (2024): 151-200
- NIRF (Universities) (2024): 101-150

Pharmacy – India
- NIRF (2024): 49
