= Institute of Advanced Studies in Education =

University in Sardarshahr, Rajasthan, India

Coordinates: 28°45′23″N 74°49′03″E

- Motto: Satya Meva Jayathe "May The Sun of Knowledge Shine"
- Type: Rural university
- Established: 1950; 76 years ago
- Affiliations: UGC, AIU, DEC, NAAC
- Chancellor: Kanak Mal Dugar
- Vice-Chancellor: Dr. R. N. Sharma
- Students: 18,000 Resident
- Location: Sardarshahar, Rajasthan, India
- Campus: Rural
- Website: www.iaseuniversity.org.in

The Institute of Advanced Studies in Education (IASE) is a deemed university in Sardarshahar, Rajasthan, India. The university is accredited as a "B+" institute by the NAAC. It is located in Churu District of Rajasthan. IASE is a deemed university recognised by UGC under section u/s 3 of ugc act-1956vide notification by MHRD no f.9-29/2000-u.3.Govt.of India. IASE university is affiliated by Govt. of India, MHRD notification on declaring the institute as Deemed to be University under f.9-6/81-u.3 dated 25 October 1983. IASE University's registrar is Dr. Dharm Singh Gehlot.

== History ==
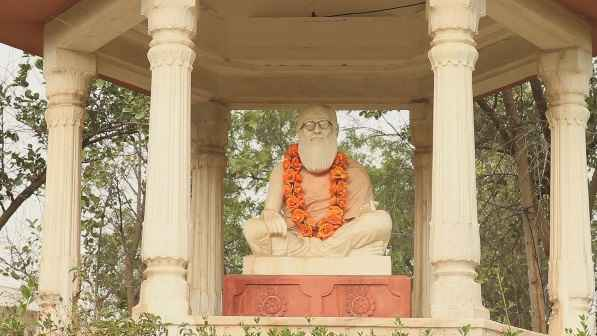
The Gandhi Vidya Mandir was established in 1950 envisioned by Shri Kanhaiyalal Dugar, on the Gandhian ideals, who later embraced sainthood.

Gandhi Vidya Mandir was established by Shri Kanhaiyalal Dugar who was born and brought up in Sardarshahr, in the erstwhile princely state of Bikaner. Shri Dugar went to Wardha and consulted Acharya Vinoba Bhave and other Gandhians like Kaka Kalelkar, Kishorlal Mashruwala, Krishnadas Jaju, Shriman Narayan Agarwal and Madalsa Ben. The project was conceptualized there and the name of Gandhi Vidya Mandir was decided. Later on, Shri Dugar consulted some other prominent personalities like Dada Ravishankar Maharaj, Swami Sharnanand, Hanuman Prasad Poddar, Sardar Vallabhbhai Patel, Acharya Tulsi and Jayaprakash Narayan. Sardar Patel had promised to lay the foundation stone of Gandhi Vidya Mandir but he died. Devised as India's first Rural University, its foundation stone was laid in 1955, by Dr. Rajendra Prasad, the first President of India.

== Programmes offered ==
=== Undergraduate degrees ===
- B.E/BTech
- B.B.A.
- B.A.
- BSc
- BEd

=== Postgraduate degrees ===
- MEd
- MBA

=== Diploma courses ===
- Architecture Engineering
- Civil Engineering
- Mechanical Engineering
- Electronics and Telecommunication Engineering
- Computer Engineering
- Electrical Engineering

== Campus ==
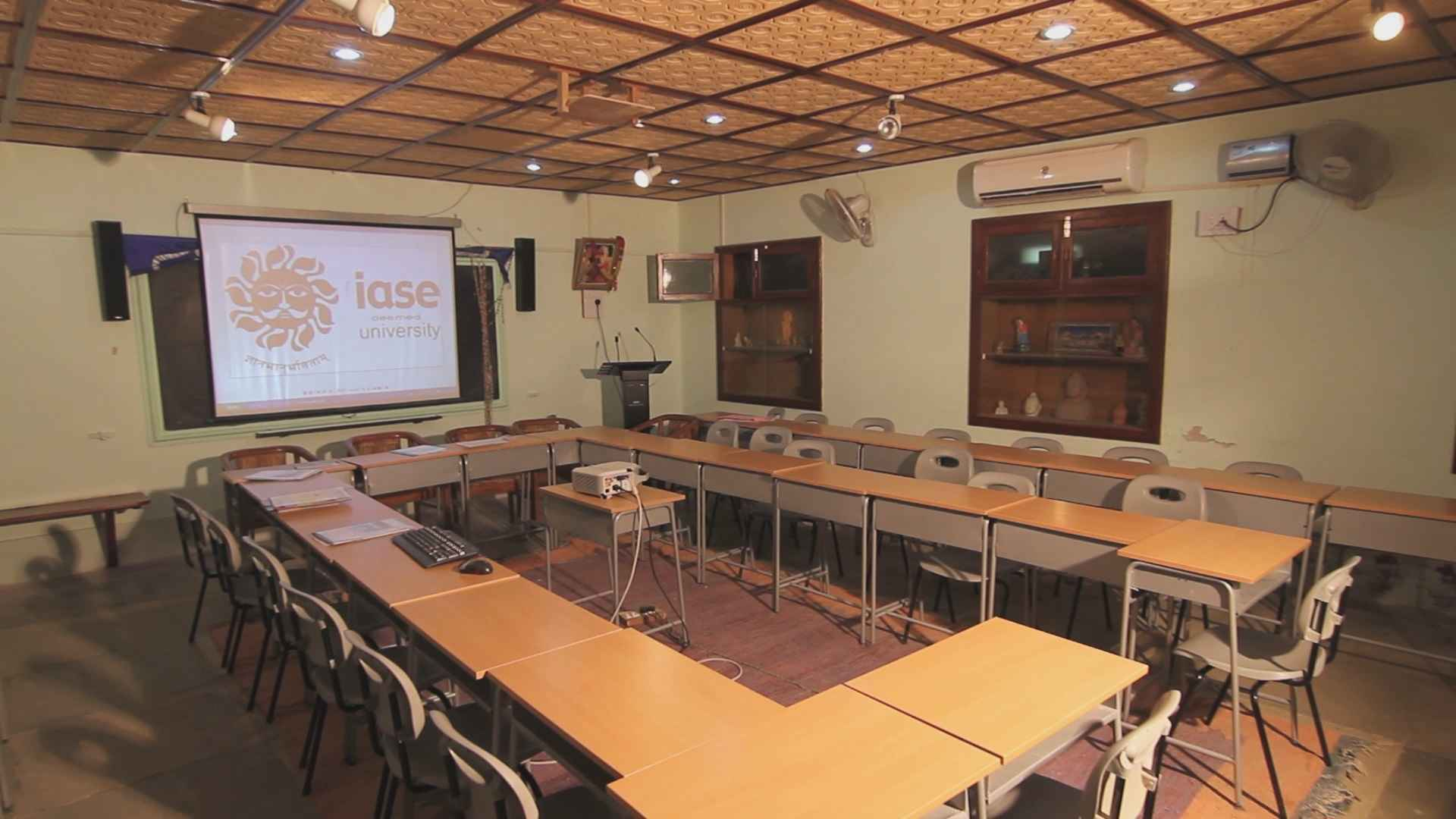
Video Lecture Room is to conduct Lectures with internationally acclaimed professors.

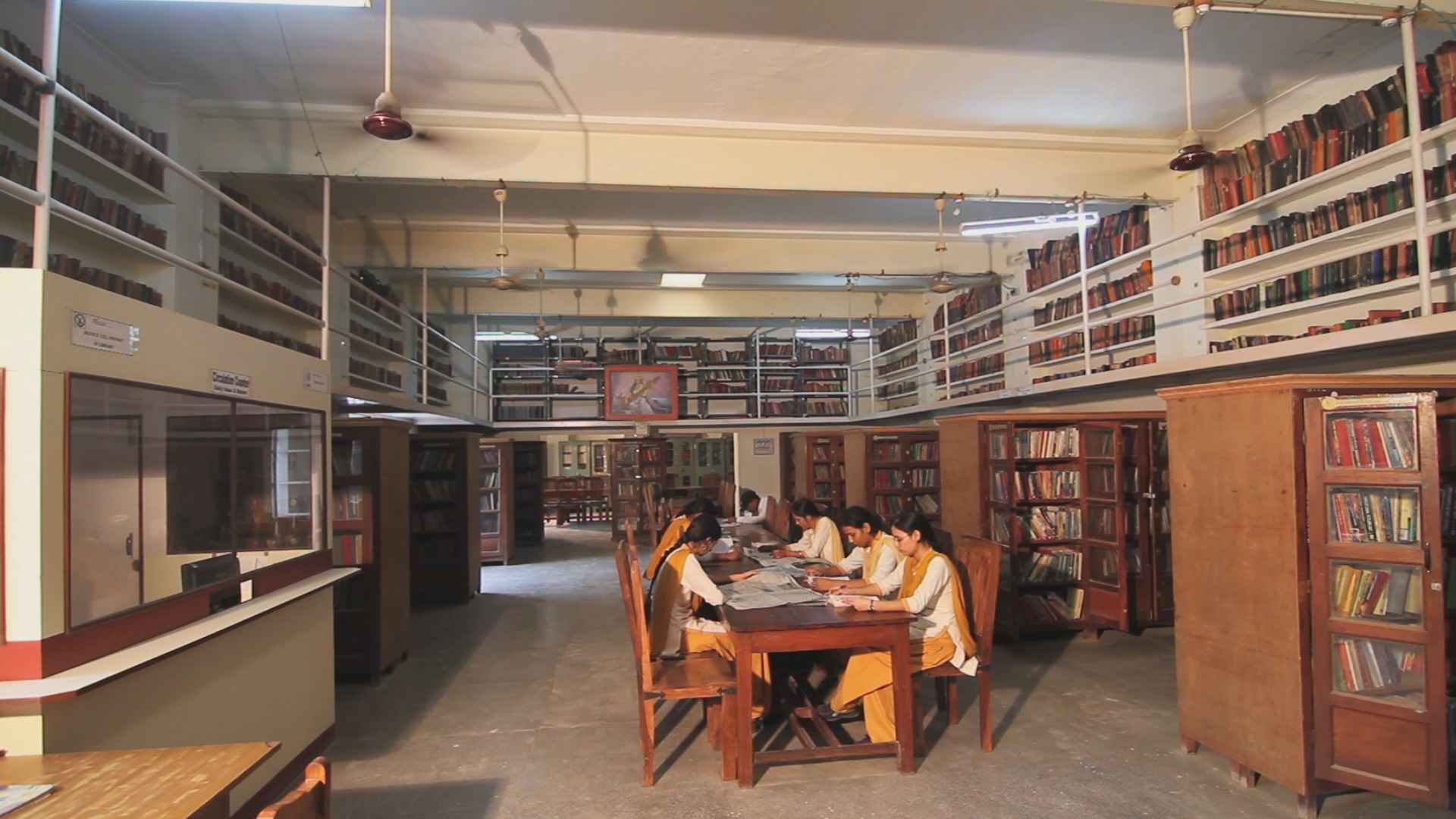
Library has about 41,604 Books which includes journals, references, CDs.

The university comprises 12 hostels—separate for boys and girls, with an intake capacity of more than 2000 students. Library has about 41,604 Books which includes journals, references, CDs. Facility also includes high speed internet, canteen, bank, sports ground, auditorium, well equipped medical facility gymnasium and a meditation temple.

== IASE Research Centre ==
To fulfill the need of carrying out Research, Development and Innovation work, IASE research center is established on campus. Its immediate goal will be to encourage faculty members and students at the Bachelor's and Master's levels to consciously bringing in research and innovation elements in their Project work. IASE does this by organizing various events like national and international conferences, workshops on research methodology, guest lectures delivered by eminent researchers from industry and academia Research and development IASE is doing research in fundamental areas of Education content, Human values, Value based science, Peace and Harmony and technology, consciousness, and human conduct.

== Training and placement cell ==
Training is provided to students to enhance soft-skills, group discussion and aptitude test capabilities as well as interview techniques.
