= University of Engineering & Management, Jaipur =

Private university in Jaipur, Rajasthan, India

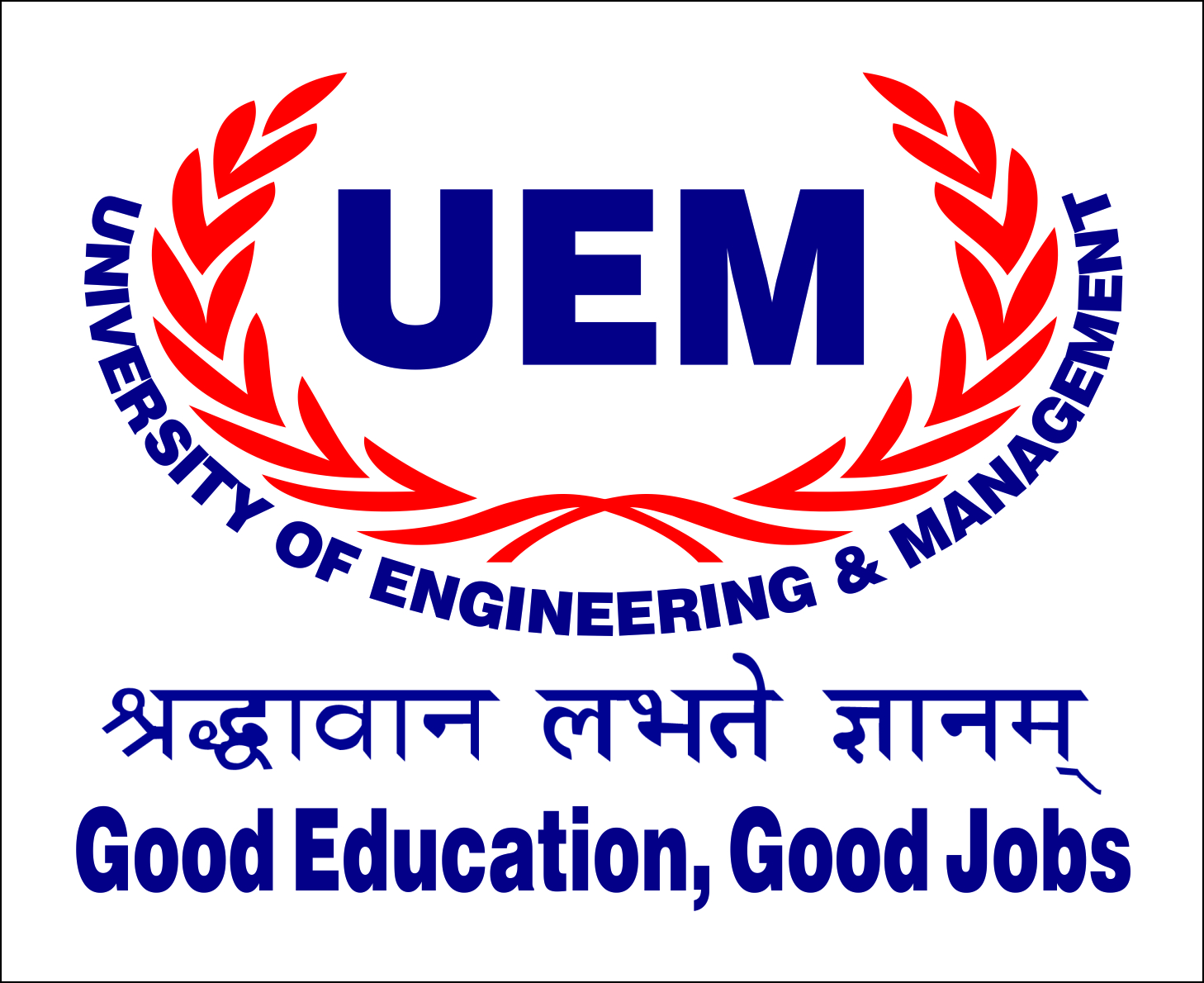
- Motto: Shraddhāvān labhate jnānam (from the Bhagavad Gita, chapter 4, verse 39)
- Motto in English: "The earnest aspirant gains supreme wisdom."
- Type: Private
- Established: 2011
- Founder: Dr. Satyajit Chakrabarti
- Affiliations: UGC, AIU
- Chancellor: Dr. Banani Chakrabarti
- Vice-Chancellor: Dr. Biswajoy Chatterjee
- Location: Gurukul, Sikar Road Near Udaipuria Mod, Jaipur, Rajasthan 303807, Jaipur, Rajasthan, India; 27.214°N 75.701°E
- Campus: Urban
- Colors: Blue & White
- Website: uem.edu.in/uem-jaipur/

University of Engineering & Management, Jaipur (UEM Jaipur) is a private university located near Sikar Road, Jaipur, Rajasthan, India. Established under a Rajasthan state enactment in 2011-2012, UEM Jaipur offers undergraduate, postgraduate and doctoral programmes in engineering, management, physiotherapy, computer applications, sciences and allied disciplines. The university emphasises industry-oriented curricula, outcome-based education, research and entrepreneurship.

== History ==
UEM Jaipur was created following an invitation from the Government of Rajasthan and was established by Ordinance No. 11 of 2011; the establishment was regularised by the University of Engineering & Management, Jaipur Act, 2012 (Act No. 5 of 2012). The university is part of the IEM–UEM group, a network of educational institutions with a focus on engineering and management education. In its first decade the institution expanded academic offerings, laboratories and student services to support teaching, research and placement activity.

== Academics ==
=== Academic programmes ===
The university offers undergraduate, post-graduates. The undergraduate courses offer B.Tech in engineering fields including Computer Science and Engineering (CSE), Electronics & Communication Engineering (ECE), Electrical & Electronics Engineering (EEE), Electrical Engineering, Biotechnology, Civil Engineering, and Mechanical Engineering. while the postgraduate courses offer M.Tech.

Apart from these, the university offers Bachelor of Computer Applications (BCA) degree course in the field of Computer Science. The institute also offers Bachelor of Business Administration (BBA) and Master in Business Administration (MBA) degree courses for the management students at the undergraduate and postgraduate level respectively. The University also offers Bachelor of Physiotherapy (BPT) degree course in the field of Physiotherapy.

=== Recognition ===
The university is recognized by the University Grants Commission (UGC) of India and has the right to confer degrees as per the section 22 of the UGC Act (1956) and as per UGC nomenclature of the degrees.

=== Collaboration & Partner colleges ===
The university has a strong collaboration with the following 2 engineering colleges of IEM-UEM Group in areas of student exchange, faculty exchange, joint research, curriculum development for students.

- University of Engineering & Management, Kolkata
- Institute of Engineering and Management (IEM)

Apart from this, the university has an affiliation with many foreign universities and colleges for student exchange programs.

== Research ==
The university has a research and development cell which encourages students for research works related to various fields of engineering. It also helps students to publish their research papers on different national and international level conferences.

== Student life ==
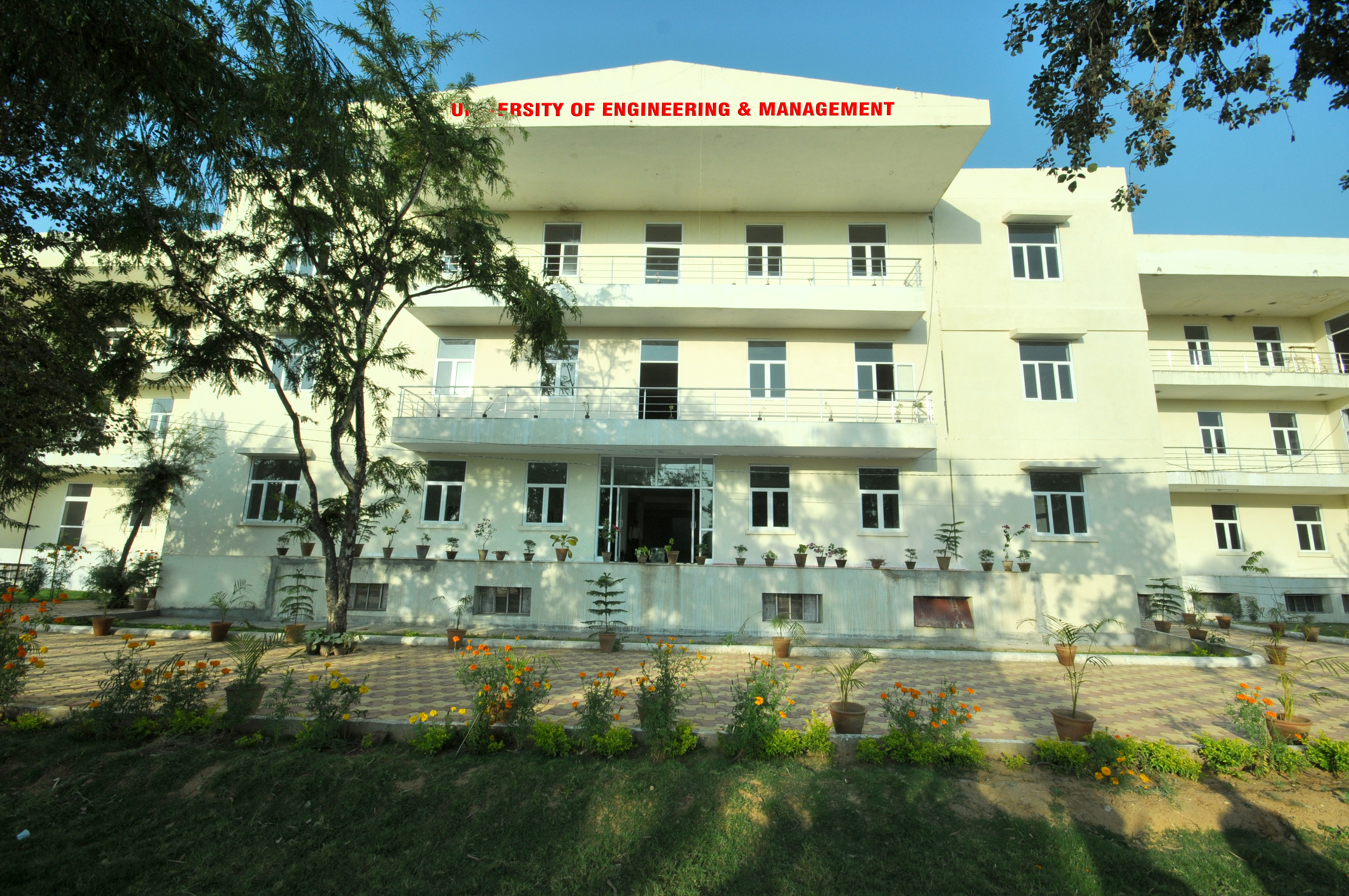
UEM jaipur campus

=== Sports facility ===
The UEM campus at Jaipur has all sorts of sports facilities like Cricket, Football, Basketball, Volleyball, Tennis courts separate for boys and girls and also indoor games facilities like Table Tennis. Annual Sports Fest is held at the campus.

=== Wi-Fi Campus === The university has Wi-Fi enabled hostels for easy access to the internet. Besides the own Wi-Fi connectivity of the university, Vodafone provides Wi-Fi facility inside the campus for free of cost. All the computers of computer laboratories and library are connected to the internet via a high-speed LAN connection.

=== Extracurricular ===
Annual Technical Festivals, Cultural Festivals, Sports Festivals are held. Robotics Workshops, are held twice a year. Apart from these, there are regular Coding Workshops, Workshops on Ethical Hacking, Web Programming etc.

Annual Optronix Conference is held at the campus where professors of international repute from Japan, USA, Canada, London come in. Students are exposed to international teaching right from Day-1.

The SPIE, USA - India Chapter is led by the students of University of Engineering & Management, and they travel to USA every year funded by SPIE and OSA (Optical Society of America). The university also has student chapters on SPIE and The Optical Society of America (OSA).

Community Development and Social Service - Teaching Street Children, Cultural activities at Old age homes, Plantation Programs etc. are regular features of the University of Engineering & Management (UEM).
