= Maharshi Dayanand Law College =

Law college in India

Maharshi Dayanand Law College situated at Jaipur, Rajasthan, India, is affiliated to the University of Rajasthan, Jaipur, which was established in 2003. It is approved by Bar Council of India. According to The Indian Wire, Maharshi Dayanand Law College is the 9th most popular 3 year LLB program in India.
