= Pacific University (India) =

Private university in Rajasthan, India

- Other name: PU
- Former names: Pacific Academy of Higher Education and Research University (PAHERU)
- Motto: Sanskrit: सिद्धिर्भवतु मे सर्वदा
- Established: 2010
- Academic affiliations: UGC, AIU
- Endowment: PAHER Society
- Chairperson: Rahul Agarwal
- President: Hemant Kothari
- Location: Udaipur, Rajasthan, India
- Campus: Urban
- Website: www.pacific-university.ac.in

Pacific University (formally known as Pacific Academy of Higher Education and Research University or PAHERU) is an Indian private university in Udaipur, Rajasthan. It was established in 2010 by the PAHER Society.

== Constituent Institutes ==
The university is made up of constituent institutes that operate undergraduate, postgraduate and doctoral level programmes. The institutes include:

- Pacific Dental College
- Pacific Institute of Technology
- Pacific Institute of Management
- Pacific College of Pharmacy
- Pacific College of Physical Education
- Pacific Institute of Hotel Management
- Pacific Institute of Computer Application
- Pacific Polytechnic College
- Pacific College of Basic and Applied Sciences
- Pacific Institute of Business Studies
- Pacific College of Social Sciences & Humanities
- Pacific Institute of Fire and Safety Management
- Pacific School of Law
- Pacific Institute of Fashion Technology

=== Pacific Dental College ===
The college and Hospital are spread over a 1.3 lakh sq.ft. area that accommodates the administration offices, nine dental departments, four lecture theatres (120 seats per theatre) and a library. The nine departments are equipped with separate under-graduate and post-graduate sections. There is a separate section on the campus having an area of 25,000 sq.ft. for the Department of Basic Sciences. The campus also includes hostels for students, with separate buildings for undergraduate and graduate students. The Institution has been ranked among NIRF Top 30 in India.

=== Pacific Institute of Technology ===
The institute offers graduate and postgraduate programs in various branches of engineering.

=== Pacific Institute of Management ===
The institute was established in the year 1997. It was the 1st private business school established in Udaipur.

=== Pacific College of Pharmacy ===
The college offers undergraduate and postgraduate programmes in addition to doctoral programme in various branches of pharmaceutical sciences.

=== Pacific Institute of Hotel Management ===
The institute was established on 30 June 2008 and more than 300 students have graduated since that time. The institute offers courses at under-graduate, post–graduate and research levels.

=== Pacific Institute of Computer Application ===
The institute offers undergraduate, graduate and doctoral degrees in computer application.

== Publications ==
The university has three monthly periodicals, Pacific Business Review International, Pacific Hospitality Review and Pacific Update. A half yearly publication, "Unnati - The Business Journal", is in addition to numerous books and monographs.

== See also ==
- List of private universities in India
