= Dr. Bhimrao Ambedkar Law University =

State University in Rajasthan, India

- Motto in English: Knowledge is Immortal
- Type: Public
- Established: 2019; 7 years ago
- Affiliations: UGC
- Chancellor: Governor of Rajasthan
- Vice-Chancellor: Dr. Nishtha Jaswal
- Location: Jaipur, Rajasthan, India
- Colours: Purple
- Website: www.alujaipur.ac.in

Dr. Bhimrao Ambedkar Law University (ALU Jaipur) is an residential-cum-affiliating University specialized in legal studies in Indian state of Rajasthan's capital Jaipur. It was established by Dr. Bhimrao Ambedkar Law University, Jaipur Bill, 2019, a bill passed by the Rajasthan assembly in February 2019 and notified on 26 February 2019. In February 2020, Dev Swarup, Additional Secretary of UGC and former Vice Chancellor of University of Rajasthan has been appointed as first vice-chancellor of the University. The university is named after Bhimrao Ambedkar, Indian scholar, social reformer, and the architect of the Indian Constitution. The university is recognized by the Bar Council of India.
