= OPJS University =

State university in Rajasthan, India

Coordinates: 28.3905°N 75.3448°E

- Motto: Wisdom
- Type: Private
- Established: 2013
- Affiliations: UGC
- Chancellor: Rakesh Sehrawat
- Vice-Chancellor: Dr. Rajesh Kumar Pathak
- Administrative staff: 120
- Location: Churu, Rajasthan, India
- Website: www.opjsuniversity.ac
- Location within Rajasthan Location within India

OPJS University is a Private University located in Churu District of Rajasthan, India. It is accredited by University Grants Commission U/S 2 of 1956. University offers courses in the fields of engineering, pharmacy, law, business education, and agriculture. The university was debarred from enrolling Ph.D. scholars and named as 'unrecognized' as it failed to provide information regarding Ph.D. degrees awarded in 2018. The university was declared defaulter by UGC in October 2025.

== History ==
According to OPJS University's trust before making the university it was started as a Primary school and the school Arya Pathshala established 1922 by late Shri Sanwaliaram. After India Independence and demise of Sanwaliaram his son, Om Parkash made a school trust board. At last Om Parkash's son, Jogender Singh founded the university. After getting permission from University Grants Commission (India), the founder named the university name on his as well as his father's name as 'Om Parkash Jogender Singh University'. The university is simply as known as OPJS University.

OPJS University Campus Photo

== Accreditation ==
UGC (University Grants Commission) AICTE (All India Council for Technical Education) NCTE (National Council for Teacher Education) BCI (Bar Council of India) PCI (Pharmacy Council of India) COA (Council of Architecture) Government of Rajasthan.

=== Allegations and UGC ban ===
The university was under investigation for allegedly issuing 43,409 fake and backdated degrees. On 6th of November 2024, UGC banned new admission in OPJS University starting from the session 2024-2025.
