= Sanjay College of Law =

Sanjay College Of Law situated at Jaipur, Rajasthan, India, is affiliated to the University of Rajasthan, Jaipur, which was established in 2003. It is approved by Bar Council of India.
