= Mody University of Science and Technology =

University in Rajasthan, India

- Former name: Mody University
- Motto: Nurturing Excellence In Women
- Type: Private
- Established: 1998
- Accreditation: UGC
- President: Dr. Ashutosh Bhardwaj
- Location: Lakshmangarh, Sikar, Rajasthan, India; 28.63015°N 75.031944°E
- Campus: Urban, 265 acres (107 ha)
- Website: www.modyuniversity.ac.in

Mody University of Science and Technology, formerly Mody Institute, is a private women's university located in Lakshmangarh in the state of Rajasthan, India. It was established in 1998 by R P Mody, an industrialist and philanthropist.

== Admissions ==
The admission is based on MU-SAT (Mody University Scholarship cum Admission test)/All India Rank/ State level Tests.

== Academics ==
The institute offers undergraduate programs leading to a Bachelor of Technology, Bachelor of Arts, Bachelor of Design, Bachelor of Commerce, Bachelor of Science degree and postgraduate programs leading to Master of Technology, Master of Arts, Master of Commerce, Master of Science degree.

== Faculties ==
Mody University has seven faculties. Each faculty has its own administration structure:

- School of Engineering and Technology
- School of Law
- School of Business
- School of Design
- School of Liberal Arts and Sciences
- School of Pharmacy
- School of Etiquette & Finishing Skills

== Campus ==
The campus is spread over an area of over 265 acres (1.07 km^{2}) full of greenery with a wide variety of trees and other plants. In a survey 96 species of birds (certified by an ornithologist from WWF-India) and 16 species of butterflies (certified by lepidopterists from WWF-India) have been identified.

The large campus has a meditation structure by the name of 'Tapovan' and a Students Auditorium for student's extracurricular activities. Along with these, the campus also has a Student's Mess for hostelers. The student's mess is Asia's second-largest with 1800 dining capacity.

== Student life ==
Mody University provides on-campus residential facilities to its students, research scholars, faculty members, and many of its staff. The institute has sports facilities for indoor as well as outdoor games. Sports facilities include yoga, equestrian, running tracks, pole vault, high jump, long and triple jump, tennis court, cricket, hockey, football, volleyball, basketball, badminton, table tennis, carom, chess.

== Spirituality ==
'Tapovan' is an on-site facility that encompasses a 'Yagna-Shala', a meditation hall and a temple spread over 8 acres. At Yagna-Shala, 7 different kinds of Yagnas are performed from 6 a.m. to 7 a.m.; each for the seven days of the week. The temple remains open from 5 a.m. to 11 a.m. and from 5 p.m. to 8:30 p.m. Grand celebrations are organized on the occasions of Ram Navmi, Janmashtami, Diwali, and other major festivals. The meditation hall, with a sitting arrangement for around 200 people, is open for everyone. Yoga classes are conducted regularly. Academic courses in Sanskrit and Vedic Astrology are offered for students who wish to pursue higher education in this sphere.
