= RNB Global University =

Private university in Bikaner, Rajasthan, India

Coordinates: 28°10′42.8″N 73°22′32.03″E

- Type: Private
- Established: 2015
- Affiliations: UGC
- Chairman: Dr. Ram Bajaj
- President: Rakesh Bhargava
- Location: Bikaner, Rajasthan, India
- Campus: Urban 300 acres (1.2 km^{2})
- Website: www.rnbglobal.edu.in

RNB Global University (RNBGU) is a private university located at Bikaner, Rajasthan, India. The university was established by the Ram Bajaj Foundation Society through the RNB Global University, Bikaner Act, 2015. The university is spread on a 300-acre campus and offers courses in various disciplines.

== Schools ==
The university houses various academic schools:

- School of Commerce and Management
- School of Journalism and Mass Media
- School of Arts and Social Science
- School of Tourism and Hospitality Management
- School of Law
- School of Science
- School of Design
- School of Planning and Architecture
- School of Medical Sciences
- School of Engineering and Technology
- School of Education

These schools provide both under graduate and post graduate programmes.

== See also ==
- List of institutions of higher education in Rajasthan
