= Dr. K. N. Modi University =

Private university in Newai, Rajasthan, India

- Established: 2010
- Chairman: Dr. Devendra K. Modi
- President: Dr. Navin Kumar Agrawal
- Location: Newai, Tonk, Rajasthan, India; 26.3888615°N 75.9148568°E
- Website: www.dknmu.org

Dr. K. N. Modi University is private university enacted by The Dr. K.N. Modi University (Tonk) Act, 2010 (Rajasthan Act No. 8 of 2010) by Rajasthan Legislative Assembly located in Newai, Tonk, Rajasthan, India. The university has a 42-acre (17 ha) campus. The periphery around the campus has a green buffer of heavy plantation, which filters out dust and noise from the vicinity and helps in maintaining pleasant surroundings. Rainwater harvesting system has been adopted. Waste water is recycled for horticultural needs. Solar energy panels supplement power generation; provide hot water in winters and street light at night. An in-house sub-station is operational.
