= Sunrise University =

University in Rajasthan, India

- Type: Private
- Established: 2011
- Affiliations: UGC
- Chairperson: Sumer Singh
- Vice-Chancellor: Dr. Balasaheb S. Garje
- Location: Alwar, Rajasthan, India
- Campus: 30 acres
- Website: www.sunriseuniversity.in

Sunrise University is an Indian private university located in Alwar, Rajasthan. Spread over 30 acre campus, the university was established under Sunrise University Act, 2011 by Government of Rajasthan, and is recognised by UGC. In January 2025, UGC barred the university from enrolling students for Ph.D programmes due to non-compliance with standards.

== Campus ==
Sunrise University (SRU) is recognized by the University Grants Commission (UGC). Established by the Sunrise Integrated Educational Trust in the state of Rajasthan [under Act No. 25 of the Rajasthan Private Universities Act 2011].

== Departments ==
Sunrise university offered more than 200 courses within the following departments:

- School of Foreign & Indian Languages
- School of Arts & Social Studies
- School of Paramedical Science
- School of Library & Information Science
- School of Education & Physical Education
- School of Journalism & Mass Communication
- School of Law
- School of Pharmacy
- School of Yoga And Naturopathy
