= Bhagwant University =

University in Ajmer, Rajasthan, India

Coordinates: 26.5373916°N 74.6585627°E

- Type: Private
- Established: 2008
- Chairman: Anil Singh
- Chancellor: Dr. Asha Singh
- Vice-Chancellor: Dr. V. K. Sharma
- Location: Ajmer, Rajasthan, India
- Website: bhagwantuniversity.ac.in

Bhagwant University is a co-educational private university located in Ajmer, Rajasthan, India.[1] Bhagwant University is privately funded by the Bhagwant Group of Institutions, established in 1999, and the State University, established through an act of the State Legislature of Rajasthan. It is registered with the University Grants Commission under Section 2(f) of the UGC Act 1956.[2]

The courses are approved by the Bar Council of India (BCI), the National Council of Teacher's Education (NCTE),[3] and the Pharmacy Council of India. Bhagwant University follows the standards of the All India Council of Technical Education (AICTE) for its technical programs.

The University is a member of the Association of Indian Universities (AIU), Federation of Indian Chambers of Commerce and Industry (FICCI), Indian Association of Physiotherapists (IAP), and All India Management Association (AIMA).

In December 2023, it was blacklisted by the Social Justice and Empowerment Department from the scholarship portal for gross irregularities related to students' scholarships.

The university is located in the rural hinterland of Ajmer.

== Academic programs ==
Bhagwant University offers programs in Aeronautical, Petroleum, Mining Engineering, Agriculture Science, Education, Law, and Paramedics.

In addition to bachelor and master programs, the University also offers MPhil and PhD degrees and it acts by the UGC norms for the award of PhD degree. Peer-reviewed research articles are published by research scholars in national and international journals and conferences.

Bhagwant University has signed MoUs with various international universities. Gannon University (United States), University of Sheffield (United Kingdom), Norwegian University of Applied Sciences (Norway), University of Western Australia (Australia), and Regenesys Business School (South Africa) for student and faculty exchange.
