= Mewar University =

University in Rajasthan, India

- Motto: Reached to unreached
- Type: Private
- Established: 2009 (15 years ago)
- Affiliations: NAAC, UGC, AICTE, BCI, AIU, PCI
- Chairperson: CA (Dr.) Ashok Kumar Gadiya
- Vice-Chancellor: Dr. Alok Misra
- Location: Chittorgarh
- Campus: 30 acres (12 ha); Mewar University Chittorgarh
- Colours: White
- Nickname: MU
- Website: mewaruniversity.org

Mewar University is a state-private autonomous university in Chittorgarh, Rajasthan, India.

== About ==
Mewar University is promoted by the Mewar Education Society (MES). It is controlled by a Board of Management, constituted by the MES, which is headed by Chairperson Dr. Ashok Kumar Gadiya.

It is an autonomous body set up by the Government of Rajasthan. The campus is located 25 km away from the city of Chittorgarh, in the vicinity of the Aravali mountain range. It covers a vast area of 30 acres. There is accommodation for around 3000 students, with sports facilities for students, Hostel of top-notch facilities, Mess with good food, Gymnasium, Secured with 500+ CCTV cameras, Clean and Green Campus and a Hospital with very good medical facilities. Mewar University is also accredited with "A" by NAAC.

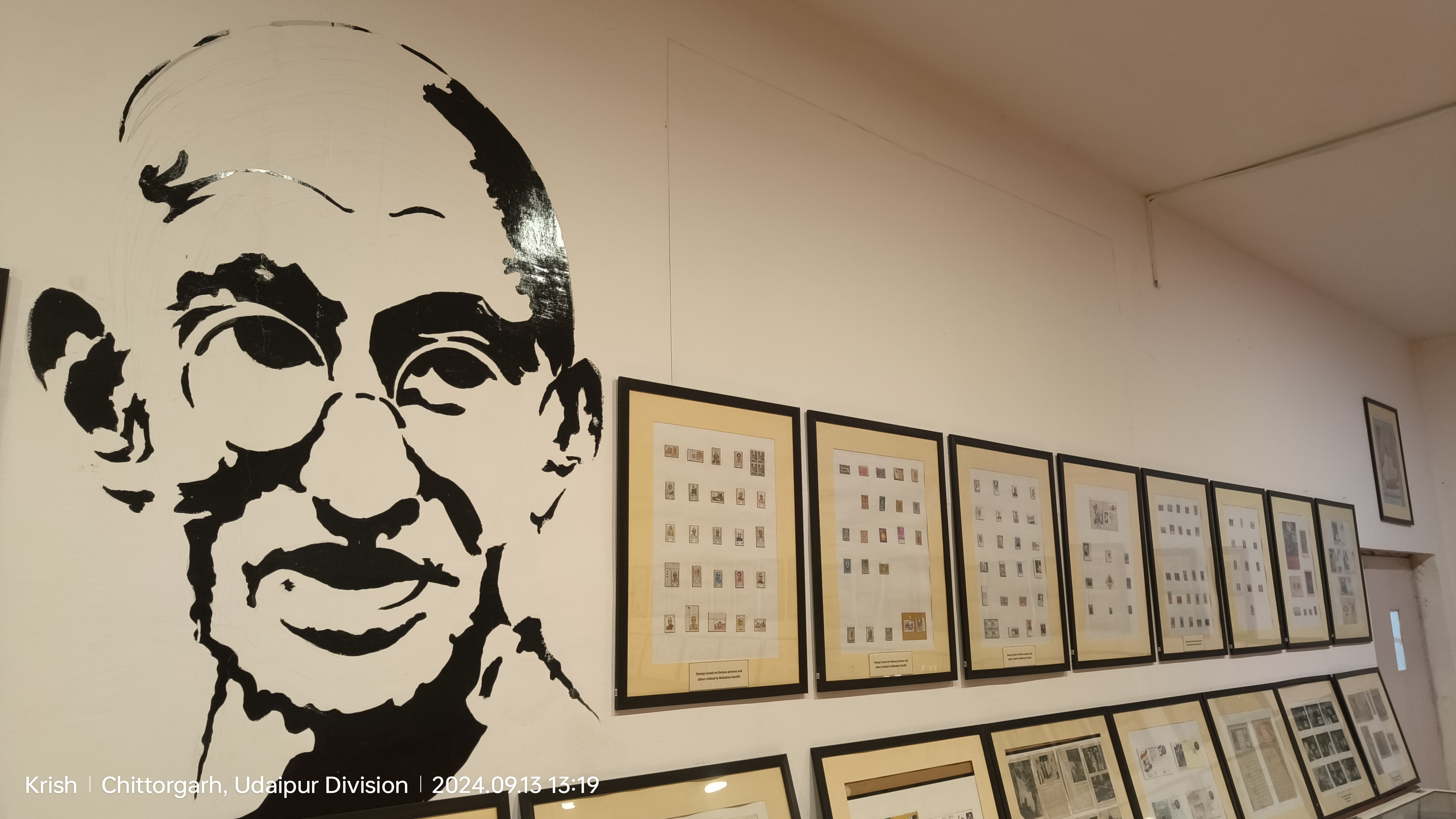
Gandhi Museum at Mewar University A view of Museum at Mewar University

== Academic Programmes ==
The university offers a range of undergraduate, postgraduate, diploma and doctoral programmes through the following faculties and schools:

- Agriculture & Veterinary Science
- Alternative Therapy
- Engineering & Technology
- Computer Science and System Studies
- Education & Psychology
- Fire Safety and Hazard Management
- Humanities, Social Science & Fine Arts
- Legal Studies
- Management and Commerce
- Mass and Media Communication
- Medical, Surgery and Paramedical
- Mewar University Hospital
- Nursing
- Physical Education
- Science & Technology
- Tourism and Hospitality Management
- Vocational Sciences, Skill Development & Entrepreneurship Studies
- Yoga and Naturopathy

The university promotes active collaboration with the government, trade and industry. Students are required to undertake industry oriented projects of their choice during their internship.

== Campus ==
The MU campus is located at Gangrar, on the outskirts of Chittorgarh city near NH 48. The campus is very conveniently connected by Air with the nearest airport at Udaipur; Rail by nearest junction at Chittorgarh and Road transport.
