= Jaipur National University =

Private university in Jaipur, Rajasthan, India

Coordinates: 26.8482911°N 75.8572343°E

- Type: Private
- Established: 2007
- Affiliations: UGC, DEB, AICTE, NMC, AIU, NAAC
- Chancellor: Dr. Sandeep Bakshi
- Vice-Chancellor: R. L. Raina
- Faculty: 400
- Students: 77,000
- Location: Jaipur, Rajasthan, India
- Website: jnujaipur.ac.in

Jaipur National University (JNU), is a private university located in Jagatpura, Jaipur, the capital of Rajasthan, India.

== Academics ==
=== Academic programmes ===
As an interdisciplinary institution the university offers multiple programs in different colleges.

=== Accreditation ===
Jaipur National University and its degrees are recognized by the University Grants Commission (UGC), All India Council for Technical Education (AICTE). They are authorized to deliver distance learning course per the Distance Education Bureau (DEB). The university was accredited by the NAAC (National Accreditation and Assessment Council) in 2015.

The university is accredited by the Bar council of India, Pharmacy Council of India, Indian Nursing Council (INC), National Council for Teacher Education (NCTE), Bar Council of India and Medical Council of India (MCI).

=== Campus Expansion ===
JNU Ras Al Khaimah Campus, UAE

In January 2024, Jaipur National University received permission from India's Ministry of Education to establish an offshore campus in Dubai, United Arab Emirates. The university subsequently established its Ras Al Khaimah (RAK) Campus in the UAE in 2024.

=== Ranking ===
The university has been ranked by India Today in 2013, 2014 and 2015 as one of India's Top 30 universities.

BioSpectrum India has ranked the university in the Top 20 Biotech schools.
