= NIMS University =

Private university in Jaipur, Rajasthan

Coordinates: 27.1927°N 75.9539°E

- Motto: One Nims One World
- Type: State private university
- Established: 2008
- Chancellor: Balvir Singh Tomar
- Vice-Chancellor: Sanjiv Sharma
- Total staff: 400
- Students: 3710
- Location: Jaipur, Rajasthan, India
- Website: Official website

NIMS University (formerly National Institute of Medical Sciences) is a private university in Jaipur, Rajasthan, India.

== History ==
Founded by Balvir S. Tomar, it was established under The Nims University Rajasthan, Jaipur Act, 2008 by the State Government of Rajasthan in March 2008.

The university was inspected in July 2011 by a committee of India's University Grants Commission (UGC), which recommended that it be granted State Private University status subject to various compliance issues, a process completed in October 2014.

NIMS University was ranked 5th among 'emerging colleges' in the medical category by a 2016 India Today/Nielsen survey.

Admission processes for NIMS University courses vary by subject area.
