= Amity University, Jaipur =

University in Rajasthan, India

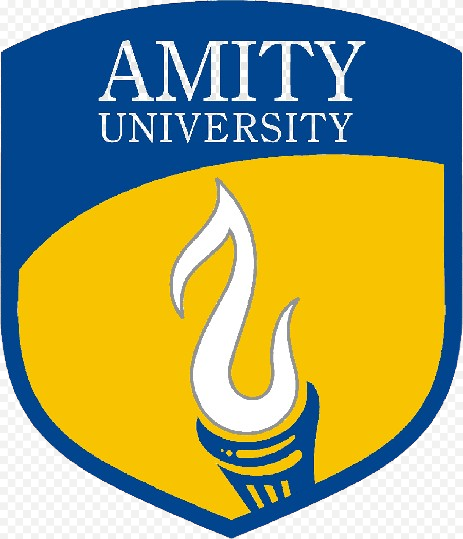
- Type: Private
- Established: 2008
- Affiliations: University Grants Commission
- Chancellor: Dr. Aseem K. Chauhan
- Vice-Chancellor: Dr. Amit Jain
- Location: Jaipur, Rajasthan, India; 27.176412°N 75.956844°E
- Website: amity.edu/jaipur/

Amity University, Jaipur is a private university located in Jaipur, Rajasthan, India. Established under the Amity University Rajasthan Act 2008 and part of the Amity Education Foundation, it is one of several Amity universities. Amity has an NAAC A+ grade, and operates on a 152-acre residential campus.

== History ==
The university was founded by Dr. Ashok Kumar Chauhan and is now led by chancellor Aseem Chauhan. chancellor Aseem Chauhan. Prof. Raj Singh and Prof. Arun Patil were the first and second Vice-Chancellors. Prof. (Dr.) Rakesh Bhatnagar, a fellow of all three major science academies of India who was previously vice-chancellor of Banaras Hindu University and Kumaun University, took charge of the position at Amity in August 2021. He was subsequently followed by Prof. Amit Jain.

Some notable figures have been on campus, including Bollywood actors Alia Bhatt and Varun Dhawan while promoting their movie Kalank. British author Jeffrey Archer who visited during the university's 10th convocation and was conferred an honorary degree.

== Programmes and campus ==
The campus spans 152 acres along the Aravalli mountain range. On-campus sports include horse riding, golf, archery, polo, lawn tennis, cricket, and basketball. Solar photovoltaic capacity installed by CleanMax Solar meets approximately 50 percent of the campus's electricity requirements, with the system expected to generate over 2.7 million kWh annually and abate around 2,265 tonnes of carbon dioxide each year.

The university offers undergraduate, postgraduate, and doctoral programmes, including:

- Engineering (including B.Tech in Artificial Intelligence and Machine Learning)
- Management (including MBA in Business Analytics)
- Law
- Liberal arts
- Science (including M.Sc in Cybersecurity)

All students are required to complete courses in a foreign language. Students may go through training programmes with the NSS or NCC.

== Academics and accreditation ==
Amity received an A+ grade from the National Assessment and Accreditation Council in September 2023, with a score of 3.31. The university has pursued partnerships with other institutions, signing memoranda of understanding with the Cognitive Computing and Brain Informatics research group of Nottingham Trent University for collaborative AI research into dementia detection, and with the Public Policy Research Institute (PPRI), a Kerala state government think tank, for joint research, student exchange, and academic publications. The Nottingham Trent agreement also marked the inauguration of the Amity Cognitive Computing and Brain Informatics Centre on campus.

== Incidents ==
In March 2012, a third-year engineering student was stabbed to death on campus by a group of first-year students in a dispute linked to ragging, resulting in seven arrests.
