= Mohanlal Sukhadia University =

Public University in Rajasthan, India

Coordinates: 24.595°N 73.732°E

- Type: Public
- Established: 1962; 64 years ago
- Affiliations: UGC, AICTE
- Chancellor: Governor of Rajasthan
- Vice-Chancellor: Sunita Mishra
- Location: Udaipur, Rajasthan, India
- Campus: Urban
- Website: www.mlsu.ac.in

Mohanlal Sukhadia University also called University of Udaipur or Udaipur University is a public university in Udaipur city in the Indian state of Rajasthan. The earlier agricultural university of 1956 was turned into a multi-faculty university in 1964 and named University of Udaipur. In 1984 it was renamed Mohanlal Sukhadia University in memory of politician Mohanlal Sukhadia. The university has two campuses spread over an area of more than 600 acres of land. Lastly, the university was accredited at "A+" Grade by NAAC Bengaluru, with a CGPA of 3.26.

== Affiliated Colleges ==
It consists of four constituent colleges and around 190 affiliated colleges from the districts of Chittorgarh, Rajsamand, Sirohi and Udaipur.

== Rankings ==
The university was ranked 59th in India by the NIRF (National Institutional Ranking Frameworki) in the pharmacy ranking in 2024.

University rankings

Pharmacy – India
- NIRF (2024): 59

== University departments ==
- Faculty of Commerce
- Faculty of Humanities
- Faculty of Management
- Faculty of Science
- Faculty of Social Science
- Faculty of Law

== See also ==
- Mohanlal Sukhadia
