= University of Kota =

University in Rajasthan, India

Coordinates: 25.1161°N 75.8216°E

- Type: Public
- Established: 2003 (23 years ago)
- Affiliations: UGC
- Chancellor: Governor of Rajasthan
- Vice-Chancellor: Dr. Kailash Sodhani
- Location: Kota, Rajasthan, India
- Campus: Urban
- Website: www.uok.ac.in

University of Kota (UOK) is a public university in Kota, Rajasthan, India. It offers undergraduate and postgraduate courses. There are more than 150 colleges which are affiliated from University of Kota.

== History ==
UOK was established through the University of Kota Act 2003. B. L. Verma was appointed as the first Vice Chancellor (VC) of the university, while the Governor of Rajasthan is the chancellor of the university. Neelima Singh was appointes VC of the university in 2021. At present Prof. B.P.Saraswat is Kul Guru (Vice Chancellor) of the University of Kota.

== Affiliated colleges ==
The University of Kota has 175 affiliated colleges and autonomous departments across the six districts of the Rajasthan state, Kota, Jhalawar, Bundi, Baran, Karauli and Sawai Madhopur, which are under the territorial jurisdiction of the university. The university has six faculties - Arts, Science, Social Sciences, Commerce and Management, Law and Education.

== See also ==
- Educational Institutions in Delhi
- Universities and colleges in India
