= List of MBA schools in India =

This is a list of notable MBA schools in India.

School name	City	State	IMT Hyderabad	Hyderabad	Telangana	Sinhgad Institute	Pune	Maharashtra
KK Modi University	Durg	Chhattisgarh						
Symbiosis Skills and Professional University,	Pune	Maharashtra						
Department of Business and Sustainability, TERI School of Advanced Studies	New Delhi	Delhi						
Symbiosis University of Applied Sciences,	Indore	Madhya Pradesh						
Indian Institute of Management Bodh Gaya	Bodh Gaya	Bihar						
SSR Institute of Management and Research (SSRIMR)	Silvassa	Union Territory of Dadra and Nagar Haveli and Daman and Diu						
Indian Institute of Management Sirmaur	Sirmaur district	Himachal Pradesh						
Department of Management Studies, IIT Roorkee (DoMS, IIT Roorkee)	Roorkee	Uttarakhand						
Vinod Gupta School of Management, IIT Kharagpur	Kharagpur	West Bengal						
Indian Institute of Social Welfare and Business Management	Kolkata	West Bengal						
Army Institute of Management, Kolkata	Kolkata	West Bengal						
National Institute of Technology, Durgapur	Durgapur	West Bengal						
Department of Management, Brainware University	Kolkata	West Bengal						
Amity University, Kolkata	Kolkata	West Bengal						
NSHM Knowledge Campus	Kolkata	West Bengal						
Indian Institute of Management Visakhapatnam	Visakhapatnam	Andhra Pradesh⁸						
Andhra University	Visakhapatnam	Andhra Pradesh						
Amity University, Raipur	Raipur	Chhattisgarh						
Balaji Institute of Modern Management Pune	Pune	Maharashtra						
Department of Management, Bhilai Institute of Technology - Durg	Durg	Chhattisgarh						
Department of Management Studies, Guru Ghasidas University	Bilaspur	Chhattisgarh						
ICFAI University, Raipur	Raipur	Chhattisgarh						
Indian Institute of Management Raipur	Raipur	Chhattisgarh						
International Institude of Business Studies (IIBS)	Bangalore	Karnataka						
Department of Industrial and Management Engineering IIT Kanpur	Kanpur	Uttar Pradesh						
Faculty of Management & Research, ITM University, Raipur	Raipur	Chhattisgarh						
School of Management, O.P. Jindal University	Sonepat	Haryana						
Institute of Management, Pt. Ravishankar Shukla University, Raipur	Raipur	Chhattisgarh						
Faculty of Management Studies, Shri Shankaracharya Group of Institutions	Bhilai	Chhattisgarh						
CMS Business School, Jain University	Bangalore	Karnataka						
Christ University	Bangalore	Karnataka						
Ramaiah Institute of Management	Bangalore	Karnataka						
Department of Management Studies, IIT(ISM) Dhanbad	Dhanbad	Jharkhand						
DoMS, Indian Institute of Science	Bangalore	Karnataka						
St. Joseph's Institute of Management, Bangalore	Bangalore	Karnataka						
St. Hopkins College	Bangalore	Karnataka						
Alliance University	Bangalore	Karnataka						
Indian Institute of Management Bangalore	Bangalore	Karnataka						
Institute of Finance and International Management	Bangalore	Karnataka						
Presidency University	Bangalore	Karnataka						
Manipal Institute Of Management	Manipal	Karnataka						
Indian Institute of Management Kozhikode	Kozhikode	Kerala						
Amrita School of Business	Coimbatore	Tamil Nadu						
AJK group of Institution	Coimbatore	Tamil Nadu						
Bharathidasan Institute of Management	Trichy	Tamil Nadu						
Department of Management Studies IIT Madras	Chennai	Tamil Nadu						
DoMS NIT Trichy	Trichy	Tamil Nadu						
Great Lakes Institute of Management	Chennai	Tamil Nadu						
Indian Institute of Management Tiruchirappalli	Trichy	Tamil Nadu						
KV Institute of Management and Information Studies	Coimbatore	Tamil Nadu						
Loyola Institute of Business Administration	Chennai	Tamil Nadu						
Madurai Kamaraj University	Madurai	Tamil Nadu						
PRIST University	Thanjavur	Tamil Nadu						
Rajalakshmi School of Management, Rajalakshmi Engineering College	Chennai	Tamil Nadu						
VIT Business School	Vellore	Tamil Nadu						
Institute of Public Enterprise	Hyderabad	Telangana						
ICFAI Business School	Hyderabad	Telangana						
Indian Institute of Information Technology, Hyderabad	Hyderabad	Telangana						
Indian School of Business	Hyderabad	Telangana						
Kakatiya University	Warangal	Telangana						
Dr. Gaur Hari Singhania Institute of Management and Research (GHS-IMR)	Kanpur	Uttar Pradesh						
Narsee Monjee Institute of Management Studies (NMIMS)	Mumbai	Maharastra						
Narsee Monjee Institute of Management Studies (NMIMS)	Bangalore	Karnataka						
Narsee Monjee Institute of Management Studies (NMIMS)	Hyderabad	Telangana						
Osmania University	Hyderabad	Telangana						
Satavahana University	Karimnagar	Telangana						
School of Management, National Institute of Technology Warangal	Warangal	Telangana						
Woxsen University	Hyderabad	Telangana						
School of Management, Bennett University	Greater Noida	Uttar Pradesh						
Delhi School of Economics, University of Delhi	New Delhi	Delhi						
Department of Business Economics, University of Delhi	New Delhi	Delhi						
Department of Business Management, University of Calcutta	Kolkata	West Bengal						
Department of Financial Studies, University of Delhi	New Delhi	Delhi						
Department of Management, Makhanlal Chaturvedi National University of Journalism and Communication	Bhopal	Madhya Pradesh						
Department of Management Studies, Birla Institute of Technology, Mesra	Ranchi	Jharkhand						
Department of Management Studies IIT Delhi (DMS, IIT Delhi)	New Delhi	Delhi						
Faculty of Management Studies, BHU	Varanasi	Uttar Pradesh						
Faculty of Management Studies, Delhi University	New Delhi	Delhi						
Goa Institute of Management	Sanquelim	Goa						
Gandhi Institute of Technology and Management (GITAM)	Visakhapatnam	Andhra Pradesh						
Great Lakes Institute of Management	Gurgaon	Haryana						
ICFAI University, Dehradun	Dehradun	Uttarakhand						
IFIM Business School	Bangalore	Karnataka						
Indian Institute of Foreign Trade	New Delhi	Delhi						
Indian Institute of Information Technology, Allahabad	Allahabad	Uttar Pradesh						
Indian Institute of Information Technology and Management, Gwalior	Gwalior	Madhya Pradesh						
Indian Institute of Management Ahmedabad	Ahmedabad	Gujarat						
Indian Institute of Management Indore	Indore	Madhya Pradesh						
Indian Institute of Management Kashipur	Kashipur	Uttarakhand						
Indian Institute of Management Lucknow	Lucknow	Uttar Pradesh						
Indian Institute of Management Ranchi	Ranchi	Jharkhand						
Central University of Jharkhand	Ranchi	Jharkhand						
Indian Institute of Management Rohtak	Rohtak	Haryana						
Indian Institute of Management Shillong	Shillong	Meghalaya						
Indian Institute of Social Welfare and Business Management	Kolkata	West Bengal						
Institute of Hospitality Management and Science (IHMS)	Kotdwar	Uttarakhand						
Indian Institute of Management Amritsar	Amritsar	Punjab						
Indian School of Business	Mohali	Punjab						
Institute of Management & Technology, Ghaziabad	Ghaziabad	Uttar Pradesh						
Institute of Management Studies, Devi Ahilya University	Indore	Madhya Pradesh						
IMI Kolkata	Kolkata	West Bengal						
International Management Institute	New Delhi	Delhi						
ITM-IFM Institute for Technology and Management – Institute of Financial Markets	Navi Mumbai	Maharashtra						
Jamnalal Bajaj Institute of Management Studies	Mumbai	Maharashtra						
KJ Somaiya Institute of Management Studies and Research (SIMSR)	Mumbai	Maharashtra						
Universal Business School, Karjat	Mumbai	Maharashtra						
International Management Institute	Bhubaneswar	Odisha						
KIIT School of Management	Bhubaneswar	Odisha						
Management Development Institute	Gurgaon	Haryana						
Mumbai Educational Trust Institute of Management Studies	Mumbai	Maharashtra						
SVKM's NMIMS (School of Business Management)	Mumbai	Maharashtra						
National Institute of Industrial Engineering (NITIE)	Mumbai	Maharashtra						
IES's Management College and Research Centre (IES MCRC),	Mumbai	Maharashtra						
New Delhi Institute of Management	New Delhi	Delhi						
The Northcap University School of Management	Gurgaon	Haryana						
PCTE Group of Institutes	Ludhiana	Punjab						
S P Jain Institute of Management and Research (SPJIMR)	Mumbai	Maharashtra						
School of Petroleum Management (SPM)	Gandhinagar	Gujarat						
Shailesh J Mehta School of Management, IIT Bombay	Mumbai	Maharashtra						
Department of Management, BITS Pilani	Pilani	Rajasthan						
SIES College of Management Studies (SIESCOMS)	Navi Mumbai	Maharashtra						
Symbiosis International University	Pune	Maharashtra						
Symbiosis Institute of Business Management, Pune	Pune	Maharashtra						
Symbiosis Institute of Business Management, Bengaluru	Pune	Maharashtra						
T. A. Pai Management Institute	Manipal	Karnataka						
Unitedworld School of Business	Ahmedabad	Gujarat						
University Business School	Chandigarh	Chandigarh						
University of Engineering & Management (UEM), Jaipur	Jaipur	Rajasthan						
TC Business School	Jaipur	Rajasthan						
Poornima University	Jaipur	Rajasthan						
JECRC University	Jaipur	Rajasthan						
Amity University, Jaipur	Jaipur	Rajasthan						
Biyani Institute of Science and Management for Girls	Jaipur	Rajasthan						
IIS University	Jaipur	Rajasthan						
Pratap University	Jaipur	Rajasthan						
Jaipur National University	Jaipur	Rajasthan						
Suresh Gyan Vihar University	Jaipur	Rajasthan						
Vivekanand Education Society's Institute of Management Studies and Research	Mumbai	Maharashtra						
Xavier Institute of Management and Entrepreneurship (XIME)	Bangalore	Karnataka						
Xavier Institute of Management, Bhubaneswar	Bhubaneswar	Odisha						
XLRI Jamshedpur	Jamshedpur	Jharkhand						
Indira Gandhi National Open University (IGNOU)	New Delhi	Delhi						
Goa Business School	Taleigão	Goa						
Mangalayatan University	Aligarh	Uttar Pradesh						
Medhavi Skills University	Singtam	Sikkim						
Chitkara Business school	Chandigarh-Patiala Highway	Punjab						
Amity University, Noida	Noida	Uttar Pradesh						
MIT Vishwaprayag University	Solapur	Maharashtra						

== See also ==
- List of business schools in Asia
- List of business schools in Hyderabad, India
