= List of business schools in Asia =

This article contains a list of business schools in Asia.

== Armenia ==
- Business School of Russian-Armenian Slavonic University

== Bhutan ==
- Gedu College of Business Studies (GCBS)

== Bangladesh ==
- Army Institute of Business Administration (AIBA)
- Bangladesh Institute of Bank Management (BIBM)
- Dhaka School of Economics (DScE)
- Institute of Business Administration, University of Dhaka (IBA-DU)
- Institute of Business Administration, Jahangirnagar University (IBA-JU)
- Institute of Business Administration, University of Rajshahi (IBA-RU)

== Cambodia ==
- American Intercon Institute, Phnom Penh
- CamEd Business School, Phnom Penh

== People's Republic of China ==
- Beijing Institute of Technology (School of Management & Economics)
- Beijing International MBA (BiMBA)
- Beijing Normal University (School of Economics & Business Administration)
- Beijing University of Technology (Economics & Management School)
- Cheung Kong Graduate School of Business (CKGSB)
- China Europe International Business School (CEIBS)
- Dalian University of Technology (School of Management)
- Dongbei University of Finance & Economics
- East China Normal University (School of Business)
- East China University of Science & Technology (School of Business)
- Foshan University (Business School)
- Fudan University (School of Management)
- Harbin Institute of Technology (School of Management)
- Hebei University of Engineering (School of Economy and Management)
- Hunan University (School of Business)
- Hunan Normal University (College of Commerce)
- Jilin University (Business School)
- Jinan University (Management School & International School)
- Nanjing University (School of Business)
- Nanjing University of Technology (College of Economics & Management)
- Nankai University (School of Business)
- Peking University (Peking University HSBC Business School; Beijing International MBA; Guanghua School of Management)
- Renmin University of China (School of Business – 60 contacts)
- Shanghai Institute of Foreign Trade
- Shanghai Jiao Tong University (Antai College of Economics & Management)
- Shantou University (Business School)
- Shanxi University (School of Economics & Business Administration; School of Management)
- Shanghai University (School of Management)
- Shanghai University of Finance & Economics
- South China University of Technology (School of Economics and Business Administration)
- Southeast University (School of Economics & Management)
- Southwest Jiaotong University (School of Economics and Business Administration)
- Southwestern University of Finance and Economics
- Sun Yat Sen University (Business School & International Business School)
- Tianjin University (Faculty of Management & Economics)
- Tongji University (School of Economics & Management)
- Tsinghua University (School of Economics & Management; School of Public Policy & Management)
- University of Chinese Academy of Sciences (UCAS) (School of Economics & Management)
- University of Electronic Science & Technology (School of Economics & Management)
- University of International Business & Economics (UIBE) (Business School)
- University of Science and Technology of China (USTC) (School of Management)
- Wuhan University (School of Economics & Management)
- Wuyi University (WYU) (School of Economics & Management)
- Xi'an Jiaotong-Liverpool University (Department of Business, Economics & Management)
- Xiamen University (School of Management)
- Xidian University (School of Economics & Management)
- Zhejiang Gongshang University (School of Business Administration)
- Zhejiang University (School of Management)

== Hong Kong ==
- Caritas Institute of Higher Education
- Centennial College, University of Hong Kong
- College of Business, City University of Hong Kong
- Faculty of Business Administration, The Chinese University of Hong Kong
- HKU Business School, University of Hong Kong
- Faculty of Business, Chu Hai College of Higher Education
- Faculty of Business, Hong Kong Polytechnic University
- Faculty of Business, Lingnan University
- School of Business and Management, HKUST, Hong Kong University of Science and Technology
- Hong Kong Shue Yan University
- Lee Shau Kee School of Business and Administration, Open University of Hong Kong
- School of Business, Hong Kong Baptist University
- School of Business, Hang Seng University of Hong Kong
- School of Business, Tung Wah College

== India ==
See also: List of MBA schools in India
Bangalore

- Alliance University, Bangalore
- DoMS, Indian Institute of Science (Department of Management Studies IISc Bangalore), Bangalore
- International Institute of Business Studies, IIBS Bangalore
- Christ University, Bangalore
- IFIM Business School Bangalore
- Vanguard Business School, Bangalore
- St Hopkins College of Management, Bangalore
- Indian Institute of Management and Engineering, Bangalore
- Indian Institute of Management Bangalore
- Institute of Business Management & Technology (IBMT), Bangalore
- Jain University, Bangalore, Karnataka

Hyderabad

- IMT Hyderabad
- Vishwavishwani Business School, Hyderabad, Andhra Pradesh
- Indian School of Business (ISB), Hyderabad
- ICFAI Business School, Hyderabad

Chennai

- Department of Management Studies IIT Madras (DoMS, IIT Madras), Chennai
- Loyola Institute of Business Administration, Chennai
- Madras School of Economics, Chennai
- National Management School / Georgia State University, Chennai
- Great Lakes Institute of Management, Chennai
- Rajalakshmi School of Management, Rajalakshmi Engineering College, Chennai, Tamil Nadu
- IIKM Business School, Chennai

Delhi, New Delhi, and National Capital Region

- Delhi School of Economics, Delhi
- Department of Business and Sustainability, TERI School of Advanced Studies, New Delhi
- Department of Business Economics (MBE), Delhi
- Shaheed Sukhdev College of Business Studies, University of Delhi, Delhi
- Department of Financial Studies, Delhi
- Department of Management Studies IIT Delhi (DMS, IIT Delhi), Delhi
- Fostiima Business School, Dwarka New Delhi
- Asia Pacific Institute of Management, New Delhi
- Indian Institute of Foreign Trade IIFT, Delhi
- Faculty of Management Studies, University of Delhi
- Indira Gandhi National Open University (IGNOU), New Delhi, Delhi
- School of Management, Bennett University, Greater Noida , Uttar Pradesh
- Indian School of Business & Finance, New Delhi
- International Management Institute, New Delhi
- Jagan Institute of Management Studies, Delhi
- Lal Bahadur Shastri Institute of Management (LBSIM), New Delhi
- New Delhi Institute of Management
- Masters Union School of Business, Gurugram
- Omega Institute Of Management & Technology, [New Delhi] [OIMT]
- Times Business School (TBS), Delhi, Navi Mumbai and Ahmedabad
- Birla Institute of Management and Technology (BIMTECH), National Capital Region
- Great Lakes Institute of Management, Gurgaon
- Institute of Management & Technology, Ghaziabad
- Management Development Institute, Gurgaon
- Maslow Business School (MBS), Ghaziabad
- Altera Institute of Management, Gurugram
- Asian Business School| Noida
- IILM GSM, Greater Noida
- NIILM CMS, Greater Noida
- Mangalayatan University, Aligarh

Kolkata

- Department of Business Management, University of Calcutta, Kolkata
- Globsyn Business School, Kolkata
- Guru Nanak Institute of Technology Faculty of Management Studies, GNIT FMS Kolkata
- Indian Institute of Management Calcutta
- [ [Indian Institute of Social Welfare and Business Management]], IISWBM Kolkata

Mumbai

- Jamnalal Bajaj Institute of Management Studies, Mumbai
- KJ Somaiya Institute of Management Studies and Research (SIMSR), Mumbai
- Fr. Agnels Business School (FCRIMS), Navi Mumbai
- Vivekanand Education Society's Institute of Management Studies and Research, Mumbai
- Welingkar Institute of Management Development and Research, Mumbai
- Shailesh J Mehta School of Management, IIT Bombay
- SIES College of Management Studies (SIESCOMS), Navi Mumbai
- MET (Mumbai Educational Trust) Institute of Management Studies, Bandra, Mumbai
- Mukesh Patel School of Technology Management and Engineering, Mumbai
- Narsee Monjee Institute of Management Studies (NMIMS), Mumbai
- NMIMS Global Access School for Continuing Education (NGASCE), Mumbai
- National Institute of Industrial Engineering (NITIE) now Indian Institute of Management Mumbai, Mumbai
- S P Jain Institute of Management and Research (SPJIMR), Mumbai

Other

- Department of Management, Makhanlal Chaturvedi National University of Journalism and Communication, Bhopal, INDIA
- School of Management Science, Tezpur University, Tezpur
- Amrita School of Business, Coimbatore
- ASBM University, Bhubaneswar, Odisha
- Banaras Hindu University (BHU), Varanasi
- Bharathidasan Institute of Management, Trichy
- Centre for Management Studies, Dharamsinh Desai University, Nadiad, Gujarat
- Chandragupt Institute of Management, Patna
- Department of Management Studies, IIT Roorkee (DoMS, IIT Roorkee), Roorkee, Uttarakhand
- DoMS NIT Trichy, Trichy
- Dr. Gaur Hari Singhania Institute of Management and Research, Kanpur, Uttar Pradesh
- Faculty of Management Studies – Institute of Rural Management, Jaipur (FMS-IRM), Jaipur
- Faculty of Management Studies, Banaras Hindu University, Varanasi
- Goa Institute of Management, Goa
- ICFAI Business School (IBS Business School, Dehradun)
- IIT Kharagpur
- Indian Institute of Information Technology and Management, Gwalior
- Indian Institute of Information Technology, Allahabad
- Indian Institute of Management Ahmedabad
- Indian Institute of Management Amritsar
- Indian Institute of Management Bodh Gaya, Gaya
- Indian Institute of Management Indore
- Indian Institute of Management Kashipur
- Indian Institute of Management Kozhikode
- Indian Institute of Management Lucknow
- Indian Institute of Management Nagpur
- Indian Institute of Management Ranchi
- Indian Institute of Management Rohtak
- Indian Institute of Management Sambalpur
- Indian Institute of Management Shillong
- Indian Institute of Management Sirmaur
- Indian Institute of Management Tiruchirappalli (Trichy)
- Indian Institute of Management Udaipur
- Indian Institute of Management Visakhapatnam
- Indian School of Business (ISB), Mohali
- Institute of Health Management Research, Jaipur
- Institute of Management Studies DAVV, Indore
- Institute of Management Studies, Devi Ahilya University, IMS, DAVV, Indore
- Institute of science and management, Ranchi
- International School of Management and Research (ISMR), Pune
- ITM-IFM Institute for Technology and Management – Institute of Financial Markets, Vashi
- Jaipur Business School, Jaipur
- KIIT School of Management, Bhubaneswar (KSOM)
- Madurai Kamaraj University, Madurai
- Manipal Institute of Management, Manipal, Karnataka
- Medhavi Skill University, Sikkim
- Millennium School of Business
- National Institute of Agricultural Marketing, Jaipur
- OCTAVE Business School, Pune
- PCTE Group of Institutes, Ludhiana
- PPG Business School, Coimbatore
- PRIST University, Thanjavur
- RNB Global University, Bikaner, Rajasthan
- School of Communication and Management Studies (SCMS), Cochin
- School of Management, National Institute of Technology Warangal
- School of Petroleum Management (SPM), Gandhinagar
- SelaQui Academy of Higher Education (SAHE), Dehradun
- SSR Institute of Management and Research (SSRIMR), Union Territory of Dadra and Nagar Haveli and Daman and Diu
- St. Joseph's Institute of Management
- Symbiosis Institute of Management Studies
- T. A. Pai Management Institute, Manipal
- Taxila Business School, Jaipur
- Tetr College of Business
- Universal Business School. Karjat
- University Business School, Chandigarh
- University of Petroleum and Energy Studies| Dehradun
- VIT Business School, Vellore
- Venkateshwara Open University
- Woxsen School of Business
- Xavier Institute of Management and Entrepreneurship (XIME)
- Xavier Institute of Management, Bhubaneswar (XIMB)
- XLRI Jamshedpur, Jamshedpur
- Department of Management Studies, Indian School of Mines, Dhanbad
- EMPI Business School
- Graphic Era Business School, Dehradun
- Institute of Public Enterprise, Hyderabad, Andhra Pradesh
- Quantum School of Business, Roorkee, Uttarakhand
- School of Business, Pune, Maharashtra
- Unitedworld School of Business, Ahmedabad

== Indonesia ==
- BINUS Business School, Jakarta
- Indonesia Institute for Management Development IPMI Business School, Jakarta
- Master of Management Program - Universitas Airlangga, Surabaya
- Master of Management Program - Universitas Andalas, Padang
- Faculty of Economic and Business - Universitas Gadjah Mada, Yogyakarta
- Master of Management Program - Universitas Indonesia, Jakarta
- Master of Management Program - Universitas Jenderal Soedirman, Purwokerto
- Master of Management Program - Universitas Lampung, Bandar Lampung
- School of Business and Management, Institut Teknologi Bandung, Bandung
- Master of Management Program - Universitas Surabaya, Surabaya
- Petra Christian University, Surabaya
- PPM School of Management, Jakarta
- Prasetiya Mulya Business School, Jakarta
- President University, Cikarang
- SAE Institute, Jakarta
- Sampoerna School of Business, Jakarta
- Thames Business School, Jakarta

== Israel ==
- Bar-Ilan University, Petah-Tikva
- Ben-Gurion University of the Negev, Beer-Sheva
- The College of Management Academic Studies, Rishon LeZion
- Hebrew University of Jerusalem, Jeruslam
- Interdisciplinary Center, Herzlia
- Recanati Graduate School of Business Administration, Tel-Aviv
- Technion – Israel Institute of Technology, Haifa
- University of Haifa, Haifa

== Japan ==
- Aoyama Gakuin University
- Doshisha Business School
- Globis University Graduate School of Management
- Hitotsubashi University
- International University of Japan
- Keio Business School
- Kwansei Gakuin University
- Nagoya University
- NUCB Business School
- University of Tsukuba
- Waseda University

== Kuwait ==
- American University of Kuwait

== Kazakhstan ==
- Almaty Management University

== Lebanon ==
- American University of Beirut, Suliman S. Olayan School of Business

== Macau ==
- City University of Macau (Faculty of Business)
- Macao Polytechnic University (Faculty of Business)
- Macau University of Science and Technology (School of Business)
- University of Macau (Faculty of Business Administration)
- University of Saint Joseph (Faculty of Business and Law)

== Malaysia ==
- Asia e University (AeU)
- Asia School of Business - In collaboration with MIT Sloan School of Management
- Han Chiang University College of Communication School of Business and Management (SBM)
- International Islamic University Malaysia (IIUM)
- Monash University Malaysia
- Multimedia University (MMU) Faculty of Business (FOB)
- New Era University College Faculty of Accountancy, Management and Economics (FAME)
- Open University Malaysia (OUM) OUM Business School
- Southern University College Faculty of Business and Management (FBM)
- Sunway University Business School
- Swinburne University of Technology
- Taylor's University
- Tunku Abdul Rahman University of Management and Technology (TARUMT) Faculty of Accountancy, Finance & Business (FAFB)
- University Kebangsaan Malaysia (UKM)
- University of Malaya (UM)
- Universiti Putra Malaysia (UPM)
- Universiti Teknologi Malaysia (UTM)
- Universiti Tunku Abdul Rahman (UTAR) Faculty of Business and Finance (FBF) & Faculty of Accountancy and Management (FAM)
- University Utara Malaysia (UUM)

== Myanmar ==
- Meiktila Institute of Economics
- Monywa Institute of Economics
- Yangon Institute of Economics
- National Management Degree College
- Victoria University College
- Myanmar Institute of Education

== Pakistan ==
- Institute of Business Management (IoBM), College of Business Management, Karachi
- Institute of Business Administration (IBA), Karachi, Department of Management, Karachi
- Lahore University of Management Sciences (LUMS), Suleman Dawood School of Business, Lahore
- Abasyn University, Department of Management Sciences, Peshawar
- Air University, Faculty of Administrative Sciences, Islamabad
- Al-Khair University, Faculty of Management Science, Abbottabad
- Bahauddin Zakariya University, Institute of Management Sciences, Multan
- Fatima Jinnah University, School of Management Sciences, Rawalpindi
- Forman Christian College University, School of Management (SOM)
- Foundation University, Institute of Engineering & Management Sciences
- GIFT University, Gujranwala
- Gomal University, Department of Business Administration, Dera Ismail Khan
- Government College University, Lahore (GC), Lahore
- Hamdard University, Hamdard Institute of Management Sciences, Karachi
- Hazara University, Government College of Management Sciences Abbottabad
- Imperial College of Business Studies (ICBS), Lahore
- Institute of Business Administration, Sukkar, Business Administration Faculty, Sukkar
- International Islamic University, Faculty of Management Sciences, Islamabad
- Iqra University, Faculty of Business Administration, Quetta
- Iqra University, Karachi
- Islamia University Bahawalpur, Department of Management Science, Bahawalpur
- Lahore School of Economics
- MDi Pakistan, Management Development Institute – Pakistan, in partnership with University of Southern Queensland, Islamabad
- Muhammad Ali Jinnah University, Faculty of Management & Social Science, Islamabad
- Muhammad Ali Jinnah University, Karachi
- National College of Business Administration & Economics, Lahore, School of Business Administration
- National University of Computer and Emerging Sciences - FAST NU, Islamabad and Lahore
- National University of Sciences and Technology, NUST Business School, Islamabad
- Preston Institute of Management Science and Technology, Institute of Management Sciences & Technology, Kohat
- Quaid-i-Azam University, Department of Administrative Sciences, Islamabad
- Riphah International University, Faculty of Management Sciences, Islamabad
- School of Business and Management, Faculty of Management Sciences, Islamabad
- Shaheed Zulfikar Ali Bhutto Institute of Science & Technology (SZABIST), Department of Management Sciences, Karachi
- University of Balochistan, Institute of Management Sciences, Quetta
- University of Central Punjab (UCP), Lahore
- University of Faisalabad, College of Management Studies
- University of Karachi, Karachi University Business School, Karachi
- University of Lahore, Lahore Business School
- University of Malakand, Commerce College, Thana
- University of Management and Technology (UMT), Lahore
- University of Peshawar, Institute of Management Studies
- University of the Punjab, Hailey college of commerce, Lahore
- University of the Punjab, Hailey College of Banking & Finance, Lahore
- University of the Punjab, Institute of Business Administration and Information Technology (IBIT), Lahore
- University of the Punjab, Institute of Business Administration, Lahore
- University of Sindh, Jamshoro, Hyderabad

== Philippines ==
- ABE International Business College
- ACSI College-Iloilo
- Adamson University College of Business Administration
- Adventist University of the Philippines
- Asian Institute of Management; Washington SyCip Graduate School of Business
- Ateneo Graduate School of Business
- Comteq Computer and Business College
- De La Salle University School of Economics; Ramon V. del Rosario College of Business
- Far Eastern University – Institute of Accounts, Business and Finance
- International Academy of Management and Economics
- Laguna College of Business and Arts
- National College of Business and Arts
- Philippine School of Business Administration
- San Pedro College of Business Administration
- Silliman University College of Business Administration
- University of the East College of Business Administration
- University of the Philippines Diliman; Cesar E.A. Virata School of Business
- University of San Carlos School of Business and Economics
- University of Santo Tomas College of Commerce and Business Administration; Alfredo M. Velayo College of Accountancy
- Bestlink College of Hospitality and Business Management

== Singapore ==
- Curtin Education Centre
- ESSEC Business School
- INSEAD, Singapore campus
- James Cook University Singapore
- Raffles Leadership Centre
- Singapore Management University (Lee Kong Chian School of Business), triple accreditation
- Singapore University of Social Sciences
- Nanyang Technological University (Nanyang Business School)
- National University of Singapore (NUS Business School)
- S P Jain School of Global Management
- Singapore Institute of Management

== South Korea ==
- Ajou University
- Chonnam National University
- Chung-an University Business School
- Hanyang University
- KAIST Business School, KAIST, Seoul
- KDI School - the school belonging to the Korea Development Institute
- Korea University Business School
- Kyungpook National University
- Pusan National University, College of Business
- Sejong University
- Seoul National University, College of Business
- Seoul School of Integrated Sciences and Technologies (aSSIST)
- Sogang University
- SolBridge International School of Business
- Sungkyunkwan University
- Yonsei University

== Sri Lanka ==
- Department of Business and Information Management, Sri Lanka Institute of Information Technology
- Faculty of Commerce and Management, University of Kelaniya
- Faculty of Graduate Studies, University of Colombo
- Faculty of Management and Finance, University of Colombo
- Faculty of Management and Finance, University of Ruhuna
- Faculty of Management Sciences, University of Moratuwa
- Faculty of Management Studies and Commerce, Eastern University of Sri Lanka
- Faculty of Management Studies and Commerce, University of Jaffna
- Faculty of Management Studies, Sabaragamuwa University of Sri Lanka
- National Institute of Business Management
- Postgraduate Institute of Management, University of Sri Jayewardenepura
- Faculty of Graduate Studies, General Sir John Kotelawala Defence University
  - Army School of Logistics

== Taiwan ==
- Fu Jen Catholic University College of Management
- NCCU College of Commerce - National Chengchi University
- National Chung Cheng University College of Management
- National Cheng Kung University College of Management
- NDHU School of Management - National Dong Hwa University
- National Sun Yat-sen University College of Management
- National Taiwan University College of Management
- National Tsing Hua University College of Technology Management
- Ming Chuan University College of Management

== Thailand ==
- Asian Institute of Technology, School of Management
- Assumption University, School of Management
- Chiang Mai University, Chiang Mai University Business School
- Chulalongkorn University, Chulalongkorn Business School
- Chulalongkorn University, Sasin Graduate Institute of Business Administration
- College of Management Mahidol University
- Kasetsart University, Kasetsart Business School
- King Mongkut's Institute of Technology Ladkrabang, KMITL Business School
- National Institute of Development Administration, NIDA Business School
- Siam University, MBA programme
- Sripatum University, Sripatum Business School
- Thammasat University, Thammasat Business School
- University of the Thai Chamber of Commerce, School of Business

== Turkey ==
- Bilkent University, Faculty of Business Administration
- Istanbul University School of Business
- Koç University Graduate School of Business
- Özyeğin University Faculty of Business Administration
- Sabancı Business School
- Sakarya Business School

== United Arab Emirates ==
- Abu Dhabi University College of Business Administration in Abu Dhabi and Al Ain
- IMET Worldwide School of Business Administration in Dubai
- American University of Dubai School of Business Administration in Dubai
- American University of Sharjah School of Business and Management (SBM) in Sharjah
- London Business School Executive MBA program in Dubai
- University of Sharjah College of Business Administration in Sharjah
- Exeed School of Business and Finance Business School in Sharjah
- Hult International Business School - Business School in Dubai
- Tetr College of Business - Business School in Dubai

== See also ==
Lists of business school, other continents

- List of business schools in Africa
- List of business schools in Australia
- List of business schools in Europe
- List of business schools in the United States
