= List of Beta Gamma Sigma chapters =

Beta Gamma Sigma is an international business honor society. It was founded in 1913 at the University of Wisconsin, University of Illinois and the University of California

== Collegiate chapters ==
In the following list of collegiate chapters, active chapters are indicated in bold and inactive chapters are in italics.

Chapter	Charter date and range	Institution	City or county	State or country	Status	Ref.
**Alpha of Wisconsin**	February 23, 1913	University of Wisconsin–Madison	Madison	Wisconsin	Active	
**Alpha of Illinois**	February 23, 1913	University of Illinois Urbana-Champaign	Champaign	Illinois	Active	
**Alpha of California**	February 23, 1913	University of California, Berkeley	Berkeley	California	Active	
**Alpha of Pennsylvania**	January 14, 1916	University of Pennsylvania	Philadelphia	Pennsylvania	Active	
**Alpha of New York**	May 18, 1917	Columbia University	New York City	New York	Active	
**Alpha of Georgia**	May 15, 1918	University of Georgia	Athens	Georgia	Active	
**Alpha of Washington**	May 18, 1918	University of Washington	Seattle	Washington	Active	
**Alpha of Iowa**	May 1, 1920	University of Iowa	Iowa City	Iowa	Active	
**Beta of Pennsylvania**	May 3, 1920	University of Pittsburgh	Pittsburgh	Pennsylvania	Active	
**Beta of Illinois**	May 5, 1920	Northwestern University	Evanston	Illinois	Active	
**Alpha of Oregon**	January 8, 1921	University of Oregon	Eugene	Oregon	Active	
**Alpha of Minnesota**	February 23, 1921	University of Minnesota	Minneapolis	Minnesota	Active	
**Alpha of Missouri**	March 1921	Washington University in St. Louis	St. Louis	Missouri	Active	
**Alpha of Ohio**	March 25, 1922	University of Cincinnati	Cincinnati	Ohio	Active	
**Beta of New York**	April 1, 1922	Syracuse University	Syracuse	New York	Active	
**Beta of Ohio**	May 12, 1922	Ohio State University	Columbus	Ohio	Active	
**Alpha of Texas**	June 3, 1922	University of Texas at Austin	Austin	Texas	Active	
**Alpha of Indiana**	March 16, 1923	Indiana University	Bloomington	Indiana	Active	
**Beta of California**	May 5, 1923	University of Southern California	Los Angeles	California	Active	
**Alpha of Nebraska**	May 10, 1924	University of Nebraska–Lincoln	Lincoln	Nebraska	Active	
**Alpha of Massachusetts**	June 5, 1925	Boston University	Boston	Massachusetts	Active	
Alpha of North Dakota	March 26, 1926–19xx ?	University of North Dakota	Grand Forks	North Dakota	Inactive	(Note: Alpha of North Dakota's charter was withdrawn when the University of North Dakota's membership in the American Association of Collegiate Schools of Business was withdrawn.)
**Alpha of Colorado**	May 14, 1926	University of Denver	Denver	Colorado	Active	
**Alpha of Kansas**	June 5, 1926	University of Kansas	Lawrence	Kansas	Active	
**Alpha of Louisiana**	June 5, 1926	Tulane University	New Orleans	Louisiana	Active	
Beta of Georgia	March 19, 1927–1933	Georgia Tech	Atlanta	Georgia	Inactive	(Note: Beta of Georgia's charter was withdrawn when the commerce program was moved to the University of Georgia.)
**Alpha of Kentucky**	February 18, 1928	University of Kentucky	Lexington	Kentucky	Active	
**Beta of Wisconsin**	March 5, 1929	Marquette University	Milwaukee	Wisconsin	Active	
**Alpha of Virginia**	June 8, 1929	University of Virginia	Charlottesville	Virginia	Active	
**Alpha of Michigan**	May 23, 1930	University of Michigan	Ann Arbor	Michigan	Active	
**Alpha of Florida**	May 24, 1930	University of Florida	Gainesville	Florida	Active	
**Alpha of Alabama**	March 4, 1931	University of Alabama	Tuscaloosa	Alabama	Active	
**Beta of Missouri**	June 1, 1931	University of Missouri	Columbia	Missouri	Active	
**Alpha of Arkansas**	February 27, 1932	University of Arkansas	Fayetteville	Arkansas	Active	
**Gamma of New York**	April 29, 1932	University at Buffalo	Buffalo	New York	Active	
**Beta of Louisiana**	1933	Louisiana State University	Baton Rouge	Louisiana	Active	
**Delta of New York**	1933	New York University	New York City	New York	Active	
**Alpha of North Carolina**	1933	University of North Carolina at Chapel Hill	Chapel Hill	North Carolina	Active	
**Beta of Virginia**	1933	Washington and Lee University	Lexington	Virginia	Active	
**Alpha of Oklahoma**	1933	University of Oklahoma	Norman	Oklahoma	Active	
**Beta of Texas**	1933	Southern Methodist University	Dallas	Texas	Active	
**Gamma of Pennsylvania**	1934	Temple University	Philadelphia	Pennsylvania	Active	
**Epsilon of New York**	1935	Baruch College	New York City	New York	Active	
**Beta of Colorado**	1939	University of Colorado Boulder	Boulder	Colorado	Active	
**Zeta of New York**	1939	Fordham University	New York City	New York	Active	
**Gamma of Illinois**	1940	University of Chicago	Chicago	Illinois	Active	
**Gamma of California**	1940,	University of California, Los Angeles	Los Angeles	California	Active	
**Alpha of Maryland**	1940	University of Maryland	College Park	Maryland	Active	
**Alpha of New Jersey**	1942	Rutgers University–Newark	Newark	New Jersey	Active	
**Alpha of Mississippi**	1944	University of Mississippi	Lafayette County	Mississippi	Active	
**Alpha of Utah**	1946	University of Utah	Salt Lake City	Utah	Active	
**Gamma of Ohio**	1947	Miami University	Oxford, Ohio	Ohio	Active	
**Alpha of Tennessee**	1947	University of Tennessee	Knoxville	Tennessee	Active	
**Alpha of Arizona**	1948	University of Arizona	Tucson	Arizona	Active	
**Gamma of Georgia**	1950	Emory University	Atlanta	Georgia	Active	
**Delta of Pennsylvania**	1950	Lehigh University	Bethlehem	Pennsylvania	Active	
**Delta of Ohio**	1951	Ohio University	Athens	Ohio	Active	
**Alpha of South Dakota**	1951	University of South Dakota	Vermillion	South Dakota	Active	
**Beta of Washington**	1951	Washington State University	Pullman	Washington	Active	
**Alpha of Montana**	1953	University of Montana	Missoula	Montana	Active	
**Beta of Michigan**	1952	University of Detroit Mercy	Detroit	Michigan	Active	
**Beta of Iowa**	1953	Drake University	Des Moines	Iowa	Active	
**Gamma of Michigan**	1954	Michigan State University	East Lansing	Michigan	Active	
**Alpha of West Virginia**	1955	West Virginia University	Morgantown	West Virginia	Active	
**Epsilon of Ohio**	1955	Bowling Green State University	Bowling Green	Ohio	Active	
**Zeta of Ohio**	1955	University of Toledo	Toledo	Ohio	Active	
**Delta of California**	1955	Santa Clara University	Santa Clara	California	Active	
**Beta of Massachusetts**	1957	Boston College	Chestnut Hill	Massachusetts	Active	
**Alpha of Wyoming**	1957	University of Wyoming	Laramie	Wyoming	Active	
**Epsilon of Pennsylvania**	1957	Pennsylvania State University	University Park	Pennsylvania	Active	
**Gamma of Louisiana**	1958	Loyola University New Orleans	New Orleans	Louisiana	Active	
**Beta of Florida**	1958	University of Miami	Coral Gables	Florida	Active	
**Delta of Illinois**	1958	DePaul University	Coral Gables	Florida	Active	
**Eta of Ohio**	1958	Case Western Reserve University	Cleveland	Ohio	Active	(Note: Chapter formed at Western Reserve, later Case Western Reserve University.)
**Alpha of Connecticut**	1959	University of Connecticut	Storrs	Connecticut	Active	
**Beta of Oklahoma**	1959	Oklahoma State University–Stillwater	Stillwater	Oklahoma	Active	
**Gamma of Massachusetts**	1959	University of Massachusetts Amherst	Amherst	Massachusetts	Active	
**Gamma of Texas**	1959	Texas Tech University	Lubbock	Texas	Active	
**Delta of Texas**	1960	Baylor University	Waco	Texas	Active	
**Epsilon of California**	1960	California State University, Fresno	Fresno	California	Active	
**Zeta of California**	1960	San Diego State University	San Diego	California	Active	
**Delta of Georgia**	1960	Georgia State University	Atlanta	Georgia	Active	
**Beta of Mississippi**	1961	Mississippi State University	Starkville	Mississippi	Active	
**Beta of North Carolina**	1961–19xx ?	Wake Forest University	Winston-Salem	North Carolina	Inactive	
**Eta of California**	1961	California State University, Los Angeles	Los Angeles	California	Active	
**Alpha of Nevada**	1962	University of Nevada, Reno	Reno	Nevada	Active	
**Epsilon of Illinois**	1962	Loyola University Chicago	Chicago	Illinois	Active	
**Epsilon of Texas**	1962	University of North Texas	Denton	Texas	Active	
**Zeta of Pennsylvania**	1962	Duquesne University	Pittsburgh	Pennsylvania	Active	
**Alpha of South Carolina**	1963	University of South Carolina	Columbia	South Carolina	Active	
**Beta of Arizona**	1963	Arizona State University	Tempe	Arizona	Active	
**Beta of Indiana**	1963	University of Notre Dame	Notre Dame	Indiana	Active	
**Beta of Nebraska**	1963	Creighton University	Omaha	Nebraska	Active	
**Delta of Louisiana**	1963	Louisiana Tech University	Ruston	Louisiana	Active	
**Delta of Massachusetts**	1963	Northeastern University	Boston	Massachusetts	Active	
**Gamma of Florida**	1963	Florida State University	Tallahassee	Florida	Active	
**Gamma of Missouri**	1963	Saint Louis University	St. Louis	Missouri	Active	
**Theta of California**	1963	University of San Francisco	San Francisco	California	Active	
**Zeta of Illinois**	1963	Southern Illinois University Carbondale	Carbondale	Illinois	Active	
**Beta of Utah**	1964	Brigham Young University	Provo	Utah	Active	
**Eta of New York**	1964	University of Rochester	Rochester	New York	Active	
**Eta of Texas**	1964	University of Houston	Houston	Texas	Active	
**Gamma of Oklahoma**	1964	University of Tulsa	Tulson	Oklahoma	Active	
**Iota of California**	1964	California State University, Sacramento	Sacramento	California	Active	
	1963	Oregon State University	Corvallis	Oregon	Active	
**Iota of Ohio**	1964	Kent State University	Kent	Ohio	Active	
**Zeta of Texas**	1964	Texas Christian University	Fort Worth	Texas	Active	
**Gamma of Nebraska**	1965	University of Nebraska Omaha	Omaha	Nebraska	Active	
**Gamma of Virginia**	1965	University of Richmond	Richmond	Virginia	Active	
**Kappa of California**	1965	California State University, Fullerton	Fullerton	California	Active	
**Gamma of Washington**	1966	Seattle University	Seattle	Washington	Active	
**Alpha of Delaware**	1967	University of Delaware	Newark	Delaware	Active	
**Delta of Virginia**	1967	Virginia Tech	Blacksburg	Virginia	Active	
**Kappa of Ohio**	1967	University of Akron	Akron	Ohio	Active	
	1968	Drexel University	Philadelphia	Pennsylvania	Active	
	1968	East Carolina University	Greenville	North Carolina	Active	
	1968	University of Hawaii at Manoa	Honolulu	Hawaii	Active	
	1968	San Jose State University	San Jose	California	Active	
	1968	Texas Southern University	Houston	Texas	Active	
	1969	Hofstra University	Nassau County	New York	Active	
	1969	University of Missouri–Kansas City	Kansas City	Missouri	Active	
	1969	University of New Orleans	New Orleans	Louisiana	Active	
	1969	Northern Arizona University	Flagstaff	Arizona	Active	
	1969	University of Rhode Island	Kingston	Rhode Island	Active	
	1969	San Francisco State University	San Francisco	California	Active	
	1969	St. John's University	Queens	New York	Active	
	1969	University of Texas at Arlington	Arlington	Texas	Active	
	1969	Wichita State University	Wichita	Kansas	Active	
	1970	University of Bridgeport	Bridgeport	Connecticut	Active	
	1970	Colorado State University	Fort Collins	Colorado	Active	
	1970	University of Memphis	Memphis	Tennessee	Active	
	1970	Northern Illinois University	DeKalb	Illinois	Active	
	1970	Purdue University	West Lafayette	Indiana	Active	
	1970	University of South Florida	Tampa	Florida	Active	
	1971	University of Wisconsin–Milwaukee	Milwaukee	Wisconsin		
	1971	University of Wisconsin–Oshkosh	Oshkosh	Wisconsin	Active	
	1971	University of Missouri-St. Louis	St. Louis	Missouri	Active	
	1971	New York University Graduate School of Business	New York City	New York	Active	
	1971	Pacific Lutheran University	Parkland	Washington	Active	
	1971	Western Michigan University	Kalamazoo	Michigan	Active	
	1972	California State University, Long Beach	Long Beach	California	Active	
	1972	University of Illinois Chicago	Chicago	Illinois	Active	
	1972	John Carroll University	University Heights	Ohio	Active	
	1973	University of Alabama at Birmingham	Birmingham	Alabama	Active	
	1973	California State University, Chico	Chico	California	Active	
	1973	Kansas State University	Manhattan	Kansas	Active	
	1973	New Mexico State University	Las Cruces	New Mexico	Active	
	1973	University of Louisiana at Monroe	Monroe	Louisiana	Active	
	1973	College of William & Mary	Williamsburg	Virginia	Active	
	1973	Texas A&M University	College Station	Texas	Active	
	1974	Cleveland State University	Cleveland	Ohio	Active	
	1974	University of Maine	Orono	Maine	Active	
	1974	Utah State University	Logan	Utah	Active	
	1975	Clark Atlanta University	Atlanta	Georgia	Active	
	1975	Eastern Michigan University	Ypsilanti	Michigan	Active	
	1975	Fort Lewis College	Durango	Colorado	Active	
	1975	Old Dominion University	Norfolk	Virginia	Active	
	1975	University of Wisconsin–Whitewater	Whitewater	Wisconsin	Active	
	1976	California State University, Bakersfield	Bakersfield	California	Active	
	1976	Texas A&M University–Commerce	Commerce	Texas	Active	
	1976	Eastern Washington University	Cheney	Washington	Active	
	1976	Idaho State University	Pocatello	Idaho	Active	
	1976	Southern Illinois University Edwardsville	Edwardsville	Illinois	Active	
	1976	Stephen F. Austin State University	Nacogdoches	Texas	Active	
	1976	Villanova University	Villanova	Pennsylvania	Active	
	1976	Wright State University	Dayton	Ohio	Active	
	1977	University of Arkansas at Little Rock	Little Rock	Arkansas	Active	
	1977	Auburn University	Auburn	Alabama	Active	
	1977	Howard University	Washington	District of Columbia	Active	
	1977	Murray State University	Murray	Kentucky	Active	
	1977	University of North Florida	Jacksonville	Florida	Active	
	1977	University of South Alabama	Mobile	Alabama	Active	
	1977	University of Southern Mississippi	Hattiesburg	Mississippi	Active	
	1977	St. Cloud State University	St. Cloud	Minnesota	Active	
	1977	Wayne State University	Detroit	Michigan	Active	
	1977	Appalachian State University	Boone	North Carolina	Active	
	1978	California State University, Northridge	Los Angeles	California	Active	
	1978	Canisius College	Buffalo	New York	Active	
	1978	Clarkson University	Potsdam	New York	Active	
	1978	Clemson University	Clemson	South Carolina	Active	
	1978	Florida Atlantic University	Boca Raton	Florida	Active	
	1978	Middle Tennessee State University	Murfreesboro	Tennessee	Active	
	1979	Ball State University	Muncie	Indiana	Active	
	1979	Bradley University	Peoria	Illinois	Active	
	1979	George Washington University	Washington	District of Columbia	Active	
	1979	Portland State University	Portland	Oregon	Active	
	1979	Tennessee Tech	Cookeville	Tennessee	Active	
	1979	Virginia Commonwealth University	Richmond	Virginia	Active	
	1979	Western Illinois University	Macomb	Illinois	Active	
	1980	Arkansas State University	Jonesboro	Arkansas	Active	
	1980	North Carolina A&T State University	Greensboro	North Carolina	Active	
	1980	University of Texas Rio Grande Valley	Edinburg	Texas	Active	
	1980	University of Central Florida	Orlando	Florida	Active	
	1980	Vanderbilt University	Nashville	Tennessee	Active	
	1980	Winthrop University	Rock Hill	South Carolina	Active	
	1981	Babson College	Wellesley	Massachusetts	Active	
	1981	Georgia Southern University	Statesboro	Georgia	Active	
	1981	Indiana State University	Terre Haute	Indiana	Active	
	1981	Lamar University	Beaumont	Texas	Active	
	1981	Seton Hall University	South Orange	New Jersey	Active	
	1981	University at Albany, SUNY	Albany	New York	Active	
	1981	University of Portland	Portland	Oregon	Active	
	1981	University of San Diego	San Diego	California	Active	
	1981	University of Wisconsin–Eau Claire	Eau Claire, Wisconsin	Wisconsin	Active	
	1982	California Polytechnic State University, San Luis Obispo	San Luis Obispo	California	Active	
	1982	Illinois State University	Normal	Illinois	Active	
	1982	Loyola Marymount University	Los Angeles	California	Active	
	1982	Montana State University	Bozeman	Montana	Active	
	1982	University of Texas at San Antonio	San Antonio	Texas	Active	
	1982	University of Houston–Clear Lake	Houston	Texas	Active	
	1982	Valdosta State University	Valdosta	Georgia	Active	
	1983	Boise State University	Boise	Idaho	Active	
	1983	James Madison University	Harrisonburg	Virginia	Active	
	1983	Nicholls State University	Thibodaux	Louisiana	Active	
	1983	Shippensburg University of Pennsylvania	Shippensburg	Pennsylvania	Active	
	1983	University of Michigan–Flint	Flint	Michigan	Active	
	1983	University of North Carolina at Greensboro	Greensboro	North Carolina	Active	
	1983	University of Tennessee at Chattanooga	Chattanooga	Tennessee	Active	
	1983	University of Louisville	Louisville	Kentucky	Active	
	1983	Western Kentucky University	Bowling Green	Kentucky	Active	
	1984	Florida International University	Miami	Florida	Active	
	1984	Georgetown University	Washington	District of Columbia	Active	
	1984	University of North Carolina at Charlotte	Charlotte	North Carolina	Active	
	1984	University of Baltimore	Baltimore	Maryland	Active	
	1984	University of Dayton	Dayton	Ohio	Active	
	1984	University of West Georgia	Carrollton	Georgia	Active	
	1984	University of Wisconsin–La Crosse	La Crosse	Wisconsin	Active	
	1985	Carnegie Mellon University	Pittsburgh	Pennsylvania	Active	
	1986	Rollins College	Winter Park	Florida	Active	
	1986	University of Central Arkansas	Conway	Arkansas	Active	
	1986	University of the Pacific	Stockton	California	Active	
	1987	Alfred University	Alfred	New York	Active	
	1987	Central Michigan University	Mount Pleasant	Michigan	Active	
	1988	College of Charleston	Charleston	South Carolina	Active	
	1988	Indiana University Northwest	Gary, Indiana	Indiana	Active	
	1988	Indiana University–Purdue University Fort Wayne	Fort Wayne, Indiana	Indiana	Active	
	1988	Loyola University Maryland	Baltimore	Maryland	Active	
	1988	Oakland University	Oakland County	Michigan	Active	
	1988	Rochester Institute of Technology	Rochester	New York	Active	
	1988	University of Colorado Denver	Denver	Colorado	Active	
	1988	University of Montevallo	Montevallo	Alabama	Active	
	1988	Western Carolina University	Cullowhee	North Carolina	Active	
	1989	Bentley University	Waltham	Massachusetts	Active	
	1989	Clark University	Worcester	Massachusetts	Active	
	1989	East Tennessee State University	Johnson City	Tennessee	Active	
	1989	McNeese State University	Lake Charles	Louisiana	Active	
	1989	Rensselaer Polytechnic Institute	Troy	New York	Active	
	1989	University of Calgary	Calgary	Alberta, Canada	Active	
	1989	University of California, Irvine	Irvine	California	Active	
	1989	University of Massachusetts Lowell	Lowell	Massachusetts	Active	
	1989	University of Vermont	Burlington	Vermont	Active	
	1990	Auburn University at Montgomery	Montgomery	Alabama	Active	
	1990	George Mason University	Fairfax	Virginia	Active	
	1990	Gonzaga University	Spokane	Washington	Active	
	1990	Millsaps College	Jackson	Mississippi	Active	
	1990	Norfolk State University	Norfolk	Virginia	Active	
	1990	Southeastern Louisiana University	Hammond	Louisiana	Active	
	1990	Suffolk University	Boston	Massachusetts	Active	
	1991	Indiana University Southeast	New Albany	Indiana	Active	
	1991	Rutgers University–New Brunswick	New Brunswick	New Jersey	Active	
	1991	University of New Mexico	Albuquerque	New Mexico	Active	
	1991	University of Texas at El Paso	El Paso	Texas	Active	
	1991	University of Colorado Colorado Springs	Colorado Springs	Colorado	Active	
	1992	American University	Washington, D.C		Active	
	1992	Indiana University South Bend	South Bend	Indiana	Active	
	1992	Iowa State University	Ames	Iowa	Active	
	1992	Radford University	Radford	Virginia	Active	
	1992	University of California, Davis	Davis	California	Active	
	1992	University of Nevada, Las Vegas	Paradise	Nevada	Active	
	1992	University of Northern Colorado	Greeley	Colorado	Active	
	1992	Western Washington University	Bellingham	Washington	Active	
	1993	University of Idaho	Moscow	Idaho	Active	
	1993	Claremont Graduate University	Claremont	California	Active	
	1993	Eastern Illinois University	Charleston	Illinois	Active	
	1993	Louisiana State University Shreveport	Shreveport	Louisiana	Active	
	1993	Missouri State University	Springfield	Missouri	Active	
	1993	Towson University	Towson	Maryland	Active	
	1993	University of North Carolina Wilmington	Wilmington	North Carolina	Active	
	1993	Valparaiso University	Valparaiso	Indiana	Active	
	1993	Weber State University	Ogden	Utah	Active	
	1994	Bryant University	Smithfield	Rhode Island	Active	
	1994	California State University, East Bay	Hayward	California	Active	
	1994	Rider University	Lawrence Township	New Jersey	Active	
	1994	Susquehanna University	Selinsgrove	Pennsylvania	Active	
	1994	University of Alabama in Huntsville	Huntsville	Alabama	Active	
	1994	University of Houston–Downtown	Houston	Texas	Active	
	1994	University of New Hampshire	Durham	New Hampshire	Active	
	1994	University of Northern Iowa	Cedar Falls	Iowa	Active	
	1995	California State University, San Bernardino	San Bernardino	California	Active	
	1995	Kennesaw State University	Cobb County	Georgia	Active	
	1995	Salisbury University	Salisbury	Maryland	Active	
	1995	Tennessee State University	Nashville	Tennessee	Active	
	1995	University of West Florida	Pensacola	Florida	Active	
	1995	University of Washington Bothell	Bothell	Washington	Active	
	1995	University of Washington Tacoma	Tacoma	Washington	Active	
	1995	Xavier University	Cincinnati	Ohio	Active	
	1996	Jackson State University	Jackson	Mississippi	Active	
	1996	California State Polytechnic University, Pomona	Pomona	California	Active	
	1996	Francis Marion University	Florence	South Carolina	Active	
	1996	La Salle University	Philadelphia	Pennsylvania	Active	
	1996	Morgan State University	Baltimore	Maryland	Active	
	1996	Rutgers University–Camden	Camden	New Jersey	Active	
	1996	Stetson University	DeLand	Florida	Active	
	1996	Thunderbird School of Global Management, Arizona State University	Phoenix	Arizona	Active	
	1996	University of Alaska Anchorage	Anchorage	Alaska	Active	
	1996	University of Alaska Fairbanks	Fairbanks	Alaska	Active	
	1996	University of Louisiana at Lafayette	Lafayette	Louisiana	Active	
	1996	Willamette University	Salem	Oregon	Active	
	1997	Northern Kentucky University	Highland Heights	Kentucky	Active	
	1997	Northwestern State University	Natchitoches	Louisiana	Active	
	1997	Pace University	Westchester County	New York	Active	
	1997	Sam Houston State University	Huntsville	Texas	Active	
	1997	Southeast Missouri State University	Cape Girardeau	Missouri	Active	
	1997	State University	Binghamton	New York	Active	
	1997	Texas State University	San Marcos	Texas	Active	
	1997	The Citadel	Charleston	South Carolina	Active	
	1997	Trinity University	San Antonio	Texas	Active	
	1997	University of Scranton	Scranton	Pennsylvania	Active	
	1998	Concordia University	Montreal	Quebec, Canada	Active	
	1998	Fairfield University	Fairfield	Connecticut	Active	
	1998	Georgia College & State University	Milledgeville	Georgia	Active	
	1998	Grand Valley State University	Allendale	Michigan	Active	
	1998	Morehouse College	Atlanta	Georgia	Active	
	1998	New Jersey Institute of Technology	Newark	New Jersey	Active	
	1998	University of Michigan–Dearborn	Dearborn	Michigan	Active	
	1998	Tuskegee University	Tuskegee	Alabama	Active	
	1998	University of Southern Indiana	Evansville	Indiana	Active	
	1998	Widener University	Chester	Pennsylvania	Active	
	1999	Butler University	Indianapolis	Indiana	Active	
	1999	Chapman University	Orange	California	Active	
	1999	Coastal Carolina University	Conway	South Carolina	Active	
	1999	Jacksonville State University	Jacksonville	Alabama	Active	
	1999	Longwood University	Farmville	Virginia	Active	
	1999	Marshall University	Huntington	West Virginia	Active	
	1999	Southern University	Baton Rouge	Louisiana	Active	
	1999	St. Mary's University, Texas	San Antonio	Texas	Active	
	1999	The College of New Jersey	Ewing Township	New Jersey	Active	
	1999	University of Texas at Tyler	Tyler	Texas	Active	
	1999	Truman State University	Kirksville	Missouri	Active	
	2000	PennWest Clarion	Clarion	Pennsylvania	Active	
	2000	Illinois Institute of Technology	Chicago	Illinois	Active	
	2000	Iona University	New Rochelle	New York	Active	
	2000	Monmouth University	West Long Branch	New Jersey	Active	
	2000	Penn State Harrisburg	Lower Swatara Township	Pennsylvania	Active	
	2000	Samford University	Homewood	Alabama	Active	
	2000	Seattle Pacific University	Seattle	Washington	Active	
	2000	Texas A&M University–Corpus Christi	Corpus Christi	Texas	Active	
	2000	Chinese University of Hong Kong	Ma Liu Shui	Hong Kong	Active	
	2000	Hong Kong University of Science and Technology	Clear Water Bay, Sai Kung	New Territories, Hong Kong	Active	
	2000	University of Tampa	Tampa	Florida	Active	
	2000	University of Southern Maine	Portland	Maine	Active	
	2000	Youngstown State University	Youngstown	Ohio	Active	
	2001	Fairleigh Dickinson University	Madison	New Jersey	Active	
	2001	Henderson State University	Arkadelphia, Arkansas	Arkansas	Active	
	2001	Indiana University Kokomo	Kokomo	Indiana	Active	
	2001	Michigan Technological University	Houghton	Michigan	Active	
	2001	Montclair State University	Montclair	New Jersey	Active	
	2001	North Carolina State University	Raleigh	North Carolina	Active	
	2001	Pepperdine University	Malibu	California	Active	
	2001	Quinnipiac University	Hamden	Connecticut	Active	
	2001	Saint Joseph's University	Philadelphia	Pennsylvania	Active	
	2001	South Carolina State University	Orangeburg	South Carolina	Active	
	2001	Union Graduate College	Schenectady	New York	Active	
	2001	University of Hartford	West Hartford	Connecticut	Active	
	2001	University of Massachusetts Dartmouth	Dartmouth	Massachusetts	Active	
	2002	LIU Post	Brookville	New York	Active	
	2002	Northern Michigan University	Marquette	Michigan	Active	
	2002	Ouachita Baptist University	Arkadelphia	Arkansas	Active	
	2002	State University of New York at Geneseo	Geneseo	New York	Active	
	2002	State University of New York at Plattsburgh	Plattsburgh	New York	Active	
	2002	University of Tennessee at Martin	Martin	Tennessee	Active	
	2002	University of Texas at Dallas	Richardson	Texas	Active	
	2002	United States Air Force Academy	El Paso County	Colorado	Active	
	2002	University of Central Missouri	Warrensburg	Missouri	Active	
	2002	University of Minnesota Duluth	Duluth	Minnesota	Active	
	2002	University of South Carolina Upstate	Valley Falls	South Carolina	Active	
	2003	Arkansas Tech University	Russellville	Arkansas	Active	
	2003	Barry University	Miami Shores	Florida	Active	
	2003	Belmont University	Nashville	Tennessee	Active	
	2003	California State University, Stanislaus	Turlock	California	Active	
	2003	Eastern Kentucky University	Richmond	Kentucky	Active	
	2003	Emporia State University	Emporia	Kansas	Active	
	2003	IE Business School	Madrid	Spain	Active	
	2003	Indiana University of Pennsylvania	Indiana County	Pennsylvania	Active	
	2003	Marist University	Poughkeepsie	New York	Active	
	2003	Memorial University of Newfoundland	St. John's	Newfoundland, Canada	Active	
	2003	Middlebury Institute of International Studies at Monterey	Middlebury	Vermont	Active	
	2003	Naval Postgraduate School	Monterey	California	Active	
	2003	North Dakota State University	Fargo	North Dakota	Active	
	2003	Pittsburg State University	Pittsburgh	Pennsylvania	Active	
	2003	Rowan University	Glassboro	New Jersey	Active	
	2003	Saginaw Valley State University	University Center	Michigan	Active	
	2003	SUNY Brockport	Brockport	New York	Active	
	2003	State University of New York at Oswego	Oswego	New York	Active	
	2003	University of South Carolina Aiken	Aiken	South Carolina	Active	
	2003	University of Wisconsin–Parkside	Kenosha	Wisconsin	Active	
	2004	Abilene Christian University	Abilene	Texas	Active	
	2004	Brock University	St. Catharines	Ontario, Canada	Active	
	2004	Columbus State University	Columbus	Georgia	Active	
	2004	Cornell University	Ithaca	New York	Active	
	2004	Elon University	Elon	North Carolina	Active	
	2004	ESSEC Business School	Cergy	Île-de-France, France	Active	
	2004	Florida Gulf Coast University	Fort Myers	Florida	Active	
	2004	HHL Leipzig Graduate School of Management	Saxony	Germany	Active	
	2004	King's College	Wilkes-Barre	Pennsylvania	Active	
	2004	Lander University	Greenwood	South Carolina	Active	
	2004	Manhattan College	New York City	New York	Active	
	2004	Minnesota State University, Mankato	Mankato	Minnesota	Active	
	2004	Morehead State University	Morehead	Kentucky	Active	
	2004	Ohio Northern University	Ada, Ohio	Ohio	Active	
	2004	Queen's University at Kingston	Kingston	Ontario, Canada	Active	
	2004	St. John Fisher University	Rochester	New York	Active	
	2004	Penn State Erie, The Behrend College	Erie	Pennsylvania	Active	
	2004	University of Sydney	Sydney	Australia	Active	
	2004	University of Ottawa	Ottawa	Ontario, Canada	Active	
	2004	Western New England University	Springfield	Massachusetts	Active	
	2004	Worcester Polytechnic Institute	Worcester	Massachusetts	Active	
	2005	Aston University	Birmingham	England	Active	
	2005	Bellarmine University	Louisville	Kentucky	Active	
	2005	Christopher Newport University	Newport News	Virginia	Active	
	2005	Colorado State University Pueblo	Pueblo	Colorado	Active	
	2005	Fu Jen Catholic University	Xinzhuang, New Taipei City	Taiwan	Active	
	2005	Instituto Tecnológico Autónomo de México	Mexico City	Mexico	Active	
	2005	Maastricht University	Maastricht	Netherlands	Active	
	2005	Mercer University	Macon	Georgia	Active	
	2005	Niagara University	Lewiston	New York	Active	
	2005	Saint Mary's University	Halifax	Nova Scotia, Canada	Active	
	2005	Savannah State University	Savannah	Georgia	Active	
	2005	St. Bonaventure University	St. Bonaventure	New York	Active	
	2005	University of Auckland	Auckland	New Zealand	Active	
	2005	University of Hawaiʻi at Hilo	Hilo	Hawaii	Active	
	2005	William Paterson University	Wayne	New Jersey	Active	
	2006	Berry College	Mount Berry	Georgia	Active	
	2006	Bloomsburg University of Pennsylvania	Bloomsburg	Pennsylvania	Active	
	2006	Augusta University	Augusta	Georgia	Active	
	2006	Clayton State University	Morrow	Georgia	Active	
	2006	ESCP Business School	Paris	France	Active	
	2006	Frostburg State University	Frostburg	Maryland	Active	
	2006	Ithaca College	Ithaca	New York	Active	
	2006	National University of Singapore	Queenstown	Singapore	Active	
	2006	Prairie View A&M University	Prairie View	Texas	Active	
	2006	Rockhurst University	Kansas City	Missouri	Active	
	2006	Roger Williams University	Bristol, Rhode Island	Rhode Island	Active	
	2006	Southern Arkansas University	Magnolia	Arkansas	Active	
	2006	Southern Utah University	Cedar City	Utah	Active	
	2006	The American University in Cairo	Cairo	Egypt	Active	
	2006	Penn State Great Valley School of Graduate Professional Studies	East Whiteland Township	Pennsylvania	Active	
	2006	University of Texas Permian Basin	Odessa	Texas	Active	
	2006	University of Waikato	Hamilton	New Zealand	Active	
	2006	United States Coast Guard Academy	New London	Connecticut	Active	
	2006	University of Evansville	Evansville	Indiana	Active	
	2006	Texas A&M University–Victoria	Victoria	Texas	Active	
	2006	University of Nebraska at Kearney	Kearney	Nebraska	Active	
	2006	University of South Florida St. Petersburg	St. Petersburg	Florida	Active	
	2007	Delaware State University	Dover	Delaware	Active	
	2007	Grambling State University	Grambling	Louisiana	Active	
	2007	Chemical Institute of Sarrià	Barcelona	Spain	Active	
	2007	National Chiao Tung University	Hsinchu	Taiwan	Active	
	2007	North Carolina Central University	Durham	North Carolina	Active	
	2007	Sacred Heart University	Fairfield	Connecticut	Active	
	2007	Shenandoah University	Winchester	Virginia	Active	
	2007	Siena College	Loudonville	New York	Active	
	2007	University of Illinois Springfield	Springfield	Illinois	Active	
	2007	University of North Georgia	Dahlonega	Georgia	Active	
	2007	University of Wisconsin–River Falls	River Falls	Wisconsin	Active	
	2007	Utah Valley University	Orem	Utah	Active	
	2007	Virginia State University	Ettrick	Virginia	Active	
	2008	Adelphi University	Garden City	New York	Active	
	2008	Fayetteville State University	Fayetteville	North Carolina	Active	
	2008	National Chengchi University	Taipei	Taiwan	Active	
	2008	Queens University of Charlotte	Charlotte	North Carolina	Active	
	2008	Rice University	Houston	Texas	Active	
	2008	Sonoma State University	Rohnert Park	California	Active	
	2008	Tel Aviv University	Ramat Aviv, Tel Aviv	Israel	Active	
	2008	University of St. Gallen	St. Gallen	Switzerland	Active	
	2008	Washburn University	Topeka, Kansas	Kansas	Active	
	2009	American University of Beirut	Beirut	Lebanon	Active	
	2009	EDHEC Business School	Lille and Nice	France	Active	
	2009	Fundação Getulio Vargas	São Paulo	Brazil	Active	
	2009	Georgia Southwestern State University	Americus	Georgia	Active	
	2009	Sungkyunkwan University	Seoul and Suwon	South Korea	Active	
	2009	SUNY Polytechnic Institute	Albany	New York	Active	
	2009	Texas A&M International University	Laredo	Texas	Active	
	2009	University of California, Riverside	Riverside, California	California	Active	
	2009	University of Dubai	Dubai	United Arab Emirates	Active	
	2010	City University of Hong Kong	Kowloon Tong	Hong Kong	Active	
	2010	City, University of London	London	England	Active	
	2010	Dalton State College	Dalton	Georgia	Active	
	2010	Durham University	Durham	England	Active	
	2010	Goethe University Frankfurt	Frankfurt	Germany	Active	
	2010	Hong Kong Baptist University	Kowloon Tsai	Hong Kong	Active	
	2010	KAIST	Daedeok Innopolis, Daejeon	Hoseo, South Korea	Active	
	2010	Meredith College	Raleigh	North Carolina	Active	
	2010	Midwestern State University	Wichita Falls	Texas	Active	
	2010	Missouri Western State University	St. Joseph	Missouri	Active	
	2010	Robert Morris University	Moon Township	Pennsylvania	Active	
	2010	Simmons University	Boston	Massachusetts	Active	
	2010	Sogang University	Seoul	South Korea	Active	
	2010	Southeastern Oklahoma State University	Durant	Oklahoma	Active	
	2010	Virginia Military Institute	Lexington	Virginia	Active	
	2011	CENTRUM Catolica Graduate Business School	Lima	Peru	Active	
	2011	Elizabeth City State University	Elizabeth City	North Carolina	Active	
	2011	Minnesota State University Moorhead	Moorhead	Minnesota	Active	
	2011	Ramapo College	Mahwah	New Jersey	Active	
	2011	Sejong University	Seoul	South Korea	Active	
	2011	Turabo University at Gurabo	Gurabo	Puerto Rico	Active	
	2011	University of Maryland Eastern Shore	Princess Anne	Maryland	Active	
	2011	University of St. Thomas	Houston	Texas	Active	
	2011	University of St. Thomas	Minneapolis	Minnesota	Active	
	2012	American University of Sharjah	Sharjah	United Arab Emirates	Active	
	2012	Auckland University of Technology	Auckland	New Zealand	Active	
	2012	Jacksonville University	Jacksonville	Florida	Active	
	2012	Le Moyne College	Syracuse	New York	Active	
	2012	Lingnan University	Lingnan	Hong Kong	Active	
	2012	State University of New York at Oneonta	Oneonta	New York	Active	
	2012	Stonehill College	Easton	Massachusetts	Active	
	2012	University of Hong Kong	Pok Fu Lam	Hong Kong	Active	
	2012	Universidad del Pacífico	Lima	Peru	Active	
	2012	University of Ljubljana	Ljubijana	Slovenia	Active	
	2012	University of Massachusetts Boston	Boston	Massachusetts	Active	
	2013	Asian Institute of Management	Makati	Philippines	Active	
	2013	Ewha Womans University	Seoul	South Korea	Active	
	2013	Florida Southern College	Lakeland	Florida	Active	
	2013	Providence College	Providence	Rhode Island	Active	
	2013	Sabancı University	İstanbul	Turkey	Active	
	2013	Sasin Graduate Institute of Business Administration of Chulalongkorn University	Bangkok	Thailand	Active	
	2013	Singapore Management University	Bras Basah	Singapore	Active	
	2013	State University of New York at New Paltz	New Paltz	New York	Active	
	2013	Universidad ESAN	Lima	Peru	Active	
	2013	University of Dallas	Irving, Texas	Texas	Active	
	2013	University of Sheffield	Sheffield	South Yorkshire, England	Active	
	2013	West Texas A&M University	Canyon	Texas	Active	
	2014	Black Hills State University	Spearfish	South Dakota	Active	
	2014	Carleton University	Ottawa	Ontario, Canada	Active	
	2014	Central Connecticut State University	New Britain	Connecticut	Active	
	2014	Feng Chia University	Taichung	Taiwan	Active	
	2014	Istanbul University	Istanbul	Turkey	Active	
	2014	Menlo College	Atherton	California	Active	
	2014	Missouri University of Science and Technology	Rolla	Missouri	Active	
	2014	Pforzheim University of Applied Sciences	Pforzheim	Baden-Württemberg, Germany	Active	
	2014	Qatar University	Doha	Qatar	Active	
	2014	Saint Xavier University	Chicago	Illinois	Active	
	2014	Southern University at New Orleans	New Orleans	Louisiana	Active	
	2014	University of Arkansas–Fort Smith	Fort Smith	Arkansas	Active	
	2014	University of South Florida Sarasota–Manatee	Sarasota	Florida	Active	
	2015	Abu Dhabi University	Abu Dhabi	United Arab Emirates	Active	
	2015	Cardiff University	Cardiff	Wales	Active	
	2015	Dominican University	River Forest, Illinois	Illinois	Active	
	2015	Drury University	Springfield	Missouri	Active	
	2015	Purdue University Northwest	Hammond and Westville	Indiana	Active	
	2015	Saint Mary's College of California	Moraga	California	Active	
	2015	SolBridge International School of Business	Daejeon	South Korea	Active	
	2015	Texas Wesleyan University	Fort Worth	Texas	Active	
	2015	University of North Carolina at Pembroke	Pembroke	North Carolina	Active	
	2015	Union University	Jackson	Tennessee	Active	
	2015	Westfalische Wilhelms Universitat, Munster	Münster	North Rhine-Westphalia, Germany	Active	
	2015	Yeshiva University	New York City	New York	Active	
	2015	Yuan Ze University	Taoyuan City	Taiwan	Active	
	2016	EGADE Business School Tecnologico de Monterrey	Monterrey	Mexico	Active	
	2016	NEOMA Business School	Paris	France	Active	
	2016	New York Institute of Technology	Old Westbury	New York	Active	
	2016	Oklahoma City University	Oklahoma City	Oklahoma	Active	
	2016	Toronto Metropolitan University	Toronto	Ontario, Canada	Active	
	2016	Stevens Institute of Technology	Hoboken	New Jersey	Active	
	2016	Universidad de Chile	Santiago	Chile	Active	
	2016	Universiteit Antwerpen	Antwerp	Belgium	Active	
	2016	University of New Haven	West Haven	Connecticut	Active	
	2016	Winona State University	Winona	Minnesota	Active	
	2016	Woodbury University	Burbank	California	Active	
	2016	Zagreb School of Economics and Management	Zagreb	Croatia	Active	
	2016	Zayed University	Abu Dhabi and Dubai	United Arab Emirates	Active	
	2016	Zurich University of Applied Sciences in Business Administration	Zurich	Switzerland	Active	
	2017	Universitas Gadjah Mada	Sleman	Yogyakarta, Indonesia	Active	
	2017	Chung Yuan Christian University	Zhongli District, Taoyuan City	Taiwan	Active	
	2017	Governors State University	University Park	Illinois	Active	
	2017	Institute of Management Technology, Ghaziabad	Ghaziabad	Uttar Pradesh, India	Active	
	2017	Kutztown University of Pennsylvania	Kutztown	Pennsylvania	Active	
	2017	Lebanese American University	Beriut	Lebanon	Active	
	2017	Metropolitan State University of Denver	Denver	Colorado	Active	
	2017	Northeastern Illinois University	Chicago	Illinois	Active	
	2017	Pan-Atlantic University Lagos School of Business	Lekki	Lagos, Nigeria	Active	
	2017	Ritsumeikan Asia Pacific University	Ōita Prefecture	Japan	Active	
	2017	Johns Hopkins University	Baltimore	Maryland	Active	
	2017	Universiti Utara Malaysia	Sintok, Kedah	Malaysia	Active	
	2017	University of Glasgow	Glasgow	Scotland	Active	
	2017	University of North Alabama	Florence	Alabama	Active	
	2018	American University in Dubai	Dubai	United Arab Emirates	Active	
	2018	Brandeis University	Waltham	Massachusetts	Active	
	2018	Jagdish Sheth School of Management	Bangalore	India	Active	
	2018	Lagos Business School	Ajah, Lekki	Lagos, Nigeria	Active	
	2018	Lawrence Technological University	Southfield	Michigan	Active	
	2018	Mississippi College	Clinton	Mississippi	Active	
	2018	Stockton University	Galloway Township	New Jersey	Active	
	2018	Texas A&M University–Kingsville	Kingsville	Texas	Active	
	2018	Universidad ICESI	Cali	Colombia	Active	
	2018	Universiti Putra Malaysia	Seri Kembangan	Selangor, Malaysia	Active	
	2018	University of Central Oklahoma	Edmond	Oklahoma	Active	
	2018	West Chester University	West Chester	Pennsylvania	Active	
	2019	ESPAE Graduate School of Management	Guayaquil	Guayas, Ecuador	Active	
	2019	Georgia Gwinnett College	Lawrenceville	Georgia	Active	
	2019	Gulf University for Science and Technology	West Mishref	Kuwait	Active	
	2019	International University of Japan	Minamiuonuma	Niigata, Japan	Active	
	2019	King Abdulaziz University	Jeddah	Saudi Arabia	Active	
	2019	State University of New York at Fredonia	Fredonia	New York	Active	
	2019	Troy University	Troy	Alabama	Active	
	2019	University of Mary Washington	Fredericksburg	Virginia	Active	
	2019	Western Connecticut State University	Danbury	Connecticut	Active	
	2019	Yonsei University	Seoul	South Korea	Active	
	2020	American University of Kuwait	Salmiya	Kuwait	Active	
	2020	Brooklyn College	Brooklyn, New York City	New York	Active	
	2020	Hankuk University of Foreign Studies	Seoul	South Korea	Active	
	2020	Insper	São Paulo	Brazil	Active	
	2020	Texas A&M University–Texarkana	Texarkana	Texas	Active	
	2021	Chang Jung Christian University	Gueiren District, Tainan	Taiwan	Active	
	2021	Russian Presidential Academy of National Economy and Public Administration Institute of Business Studies	Moscow	Russia	Active	
	2021	Whitworth University	Spokane County	Washington	Active	
	2022	Dominican University of California	San Rafael	California	Active	
	2022	Lipscomb University	Nashville	Tennessee	Active	
	2022	Salem State University	Salem	Massachusetts	Active	
	2022	Slippery Rock University, Pennsylvania	Slippery Rock	Pennsylvania	Active	
	2022	Stony Brook University	Stony Brook	New York	Active	
	2022	Universidad de Monterrey	San Pedro Garza García	Mexico	Active	
	2023	Nagoya University of Commerce & Business	Nisshin, Aichi	Japan	Active	
		Bucknell University	Lewisburg	Pennsylvania		
Group ESC Clermont		ESC Clermont Business School	Clermont-Ferrand	France		

== Alumni chapters ==
In the following list of alumni chapters, active chapters are indicated in bold and inactive chapters are in italics.

Chapter	Charter date and range	City	State or country	Status	Ref.
New York City Alumni Chapter	1933	New York City	New York	Active	
Chicagoland Alumni Chapter	1998	Chicago	Illinois	Active	
Los Angeles Area Alumni Chapter	1998	Los Angeles	California	Active	
Atlanta Area Alumni Chapter	1999	Atlanta	Georgia	Active	
San Diego Area Alumni Chapter	1999	San Diego	California	Active	
Washington, D.C. Area Alumni Chapter	1999	Washington, D.C.		Active	
Boston Area Alumni Chapter	2000	Boston	Massachusetts	Active	
Dallas / Ft. Worth Alumni Chapter	2000	Dallas and Fort Worth	Texas	Active	
San Francisco Area Alumni Chapter	2000	San Francisco	California	Active	
Houston Area Alumni Chapter	2001	Houston	Texas	Active	
Philadelphia Area Alumni Chapter	2001	Philadelphia	Pennsylvania	Active	
St. Louis Area Alumni Chapter	2001	St. Louis	Missouri	Active	
Seattle/Tacoma Area Alumni Chapter	2001	Seattle and Tacoma	Washington	Active	
Minneapolis / St. Paul Area Alumni Chapter	2002	Minneapolis and Saint Paul	Minnesota	Active	
Phoenix Area Alumni Chapter	2002	Phoenix	Arizona	Active	
South Florida Area Alumni Chapter	2002		Florida	Active	
Denver Area Alumni Chapter	2004	Denver	Colorado	Active	
Hong Kong Alumni Chapter	2005		Hong Kong	Active	
Charlotte Area Alumni Chapter	2007	Charlotte	North Carolina	Active	
Cleveland Area Alumni Chapter	2007	Cleveland	Ohio	Active	
New Zealand Alumni Chapter	2009		New Zealand	Active	
Raleigh / Durham Area Alumni Chapter	2009	Raleigh and Durham	North Carolina	Active	
South Texas Area Alumni Chapter	2009		Texas	Active	
Switzerland Alumni Chapter	2009		Switzerland	Active	
Germany Alumni Chapter	2011		Germany	Active	
Spain Alumni Chapter	2011		Spain	Active	
London Area Alumni Chapter	2013	London	England	Active	
Toronto Area Alumni Chapter	2013	Toronto	Ontario, Canada	Active	
Peru Alumni Chapter	2015		Peru	Active	
Chile Alumni Chapter	2017		Chile	Active	
Australia Alumni Chapter	2019		Australia	Active	
Detroit Area Alumni Chapter	2019	Detroit	Michigan	Active	
