= Dylan Son =

South Korean entrepreneur and academic

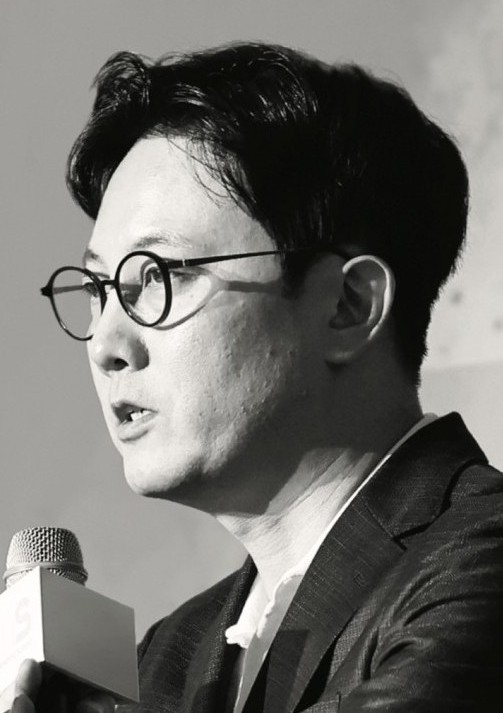
- Dylan Son speaking at a public event

Korean name
- Hangul: 손동진
- RR: Son Dongjin
- MR: Son Tongjin

Dylan Son (Korean: 손동진) is a South Korean entrepreneur, author, and academic specializing in the fields of advertising technology and artificial intelligence. He is the founder and CEO of DexterKrema, a digital advertising company.

== Career ==
Son founded Krema Worldwide in Seoul in 2009 as a marketing and technology firm. In 2021, Dexter Studios acquired the company, which was subsequently renamed DexterKrema. Dexter Studios had previously completed visual effects work for films including Parasite and Squid Game.

Under Son's leadership, DexterKrema has focused on applying AI to advertising. In 2024, DexterKrema signed a technology-transfer agreement with the Korea Institute of Science and Technology Information (KISTI) involving their Korean small language model “KONI,” with the stated goal of developing an advertising-domain language model by fine-tuning it using proprietary advertising datasets and retrieval-augmented generation techniques. KONI is being applied within DexterKrema’s Adplorer platform as part of ongoing work to develop language-model capabilities for advertising use cases. Son has also developed the concept of “Flu-tech” (influencer technology), which DexterKrema applies through its Linkplorer influencer marketing platform.

== Recognition ==
In line with the South Korean government's policies of AI investment and creating a better work-life balance, Son has received the Iron Tower Order of Industrial Service Merit by the Government of South Korea's Ministry of Employment and Labor for advancing gender equality and work–life balance in the advertising industry and the Ministry of Science and ICT Excellence Award for the application of AI in the advertising industry.

He serves as Chairperson of the AI Agent Committee of the Korea AX Industry Marketing Association and Vice President of the Industry Division of the Korean Society of Commodity Science.

== Academic activity ==
Son has held adjunct teaching positions at Yonsei University, Sookmyung Women's University, and ASSIST Business School. He earned a Ph.D. in Digital Content from Kyung Hee University and an MBA from Aalto University (formerly the Helsinki School of Economics).

== Selected publications ==
Originality: Become a Brand or Remain Data explores the role of artificial intelligence in branding and identity formation.

Boss, It’s Now AX discusses AI transformation (AX) and digital innovation in business.
