= MET Institute of Management =

Mumbai, India private business college

- Other names: MET IOM
- Type: Private Business School
- Established: 1989
- Parent institution: Mumbai Educational Trust
- Affiliations: University of Mumbai
- Location: Mumbai, Maharashtra, India
- Website: www.met.edu/institute/institute_of_management/

MET Institute of Management is a private business school in Mumbai, India. The school was founded in the year 1989 and is located in the Mumbai suburb of Bandra. It is associated with the University of Mumbai and is AICTE ISO 9001:2015 certified.

== Programmes ==
MET Institute of Management offers the following programmes:

=== Master of Management Studies (MMS) ===
MET Institute of Management offers Master of Management Studies (MMS): which is a two years full-time Post-Graduate programme affiliated to University of Mumbai and Approved by the Directorate of Technical Education & All India Council for Technical Education. Specializations include:

- Finance
- Marketing
- Human Resources
- Operations
- Systems/Information Technology

=== Part Time Masters Degree ===
Part Time master's degree offered at MET Institute of Management is a three-year, part-time Post Graduate programme affiliated to University of Mumbai.

- Finance
- Marketing
- Human Resource Development
- Operations
- Information Systems

=== PhD in Management ===
PhD in Management is a post-master's programme affiliated to the University of Mumbai.

== Rankings ==
Ranked 5th Best B School in Mumbai and 28th Best Pvt. B School All India by the Times B School Survey 2019
