= Goa Business School =

Department of Goa University

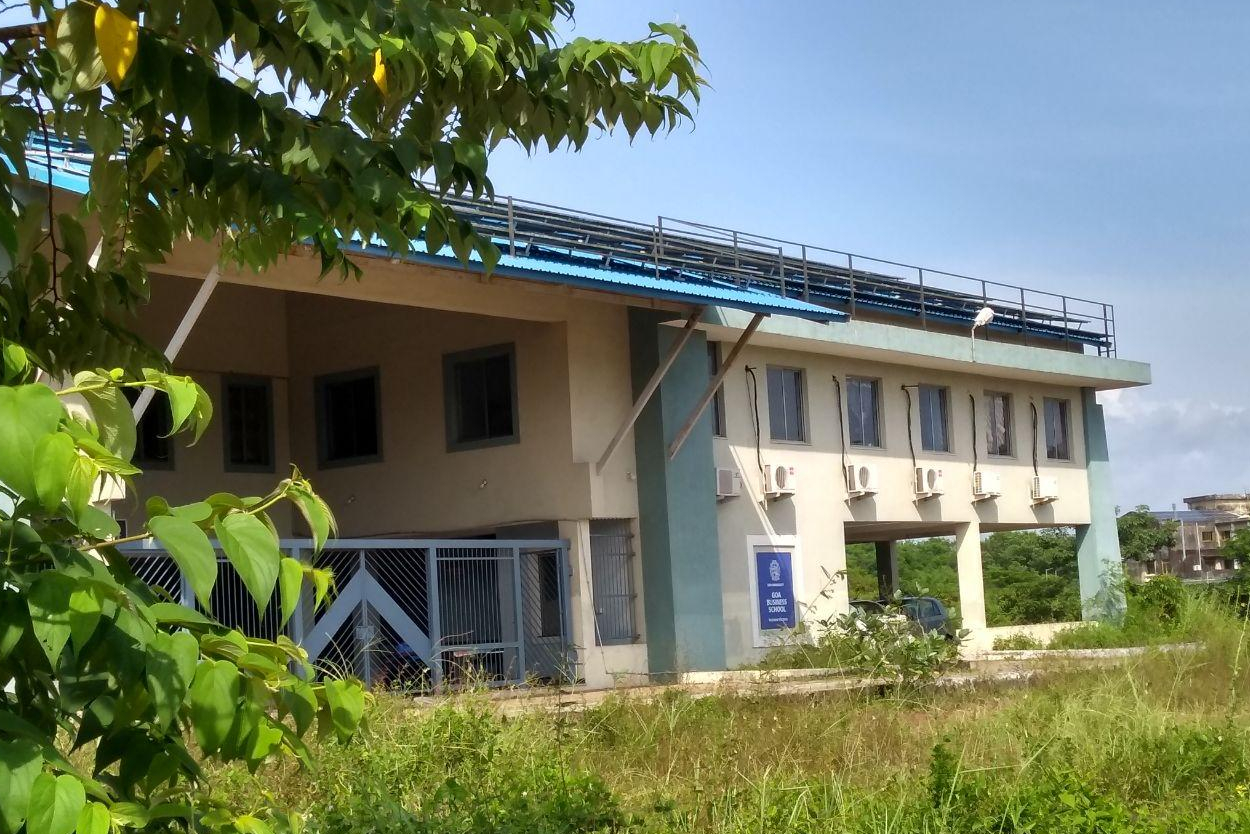
- Type: State business school
- Established: 2019; 7 years ago
- Academic affiliations: Goa University
- Dean: M.S. Dayanand
- Location: Goa, India; 15.460°N 73.824°E
- Campus: Semi-Urban
- Website: www.unigoa.ac.in/dept/goa-business-school.html

The Goa Business School is a 2019-launched school attached to the Goa University in the city of Panaji, India. It was set up following the amalgamation of four earlier-launched departments of the university — Commerce (established in 1988), Computer Science & Technology (1987), Economics (launched in 1968 through the Centre for Post-Graduate Instruction and Research at Goa and affiliated to then University of Bombay) and Management Studies (1988).

== Purpose ==
The amalgamation was intended to "allow the faculty and research students to discover new synergies that remained hidden within department silos, re-brand and showcase [Goa University's] strengths in research and teaching in these areas together."

== Programmes offered ==
Its academic programmes include: M.SC. Integrated, Integrated MBA (Hospitality, Travel & Tourism), M.A. Economics, M.Com, MCA, MBA, MBA (Executive), MBA (Financial Services), M.Phil (Computer Science), M.Phil (Economics), M.Phil (Management Studies), Ph.D. Commerce, Ph.D. Economics, and Ph.D. Management Studies.

== Officiating ==
As of October 2020, the Dean of the Goa Business School is M.S. Dayanand, Professor of Management Studies; Vice-Dean (Academic) is Subhash K.B., Professor of Commerce; while the Vice-Dean (Research) is Sudarsan P.K., Professor of Economics.

== IT Summit ==
In October 2019, the Goa Business School IT Summit (GBSITS) was organised at the Dr Shyama Prasad Mukharjee Indoor Stadium, Taleigao.

== Early studies ==
Some early work which drew media attention included local Goa-related studies looking at palm feni production being adversely affected by a lack of toddy-tappers, the traditional workers who extracted toddy from coconut trees which are abundant in the area.
