= Chung-ang University Business School =

Business school in Seoul, South Korea

Coordinates: 37°30′14″N 127°00′17″E

Chung-Ang University Business School
- Former names: Division of Commerce, Chung-Ang University
- Type: Public business school
- Established: 1955
- Parent institution: Chung-Ang University
- Affiliations: AACSB
- Location: Chung-Ang University, Seoul, Seoul, South Korea
- Campus: Seoul
- Language: Korean and English
- Website: https://biz.cau.ac.kr/

The Chung-Ang University Business School (CBS) is the undergraduate and graduate business school of Chung-Ang University, located in Seoul, South Korea.

The school traces its origins to the Division of Commerce established in 1948, in the context of the founding of the university in Seoul. This academic unit was formally reorganized in March 1955, becoming a university-level business school, a development described as a milestone as it was the first institution of its kind established in South Korea.

During the following decades, the school developed regular academic programs in business administration, commerce, and related fields, gradually integrating into the university’s broader academic structure.

== History ==
In 1995, the unit adopted the name College of Business Administration, as part of an institutional reorganization of the South Korean higher education system. That same year, it was evaluated among the country’s leading departments in business, commerce, and accounting by the Korean Council for University Education.

In 2006, the Graduate School of Business was established, expanding the academic scope of CBS to postgraduate education, including master’s, doctoral, and MBA programs. From that point onward, the school has offered an integrated academic structure encompassing both undergraduate and graduate studies in business administration and management.

At the international level, CBS established academic cooperation programs with foreign institutions, including a dual-degree program jointly developed with Fudan University in Shanghai. This agreement allows students to complete part of their studies in South Korea and China, and to obtain degrees awarded by both institutions within their respective postgraduate programs.

Currently, CBS forms part of the university’s regular academic system, carrying out teaching and research activities in business and management, and maintaining international cooperation links through the institutional mechanisms of its parent university.

== International relations ==
The school maintains academic cooperation and international exchange programs through the university’s Division of International Cooperation, facilitating opportunities for study, teaching, and research abroad for students and faculty members.

Researchers affiliated with CBS have produced research in corporate finance that has attracted international attention.
