= Business School of Russian-Armenian Slavonic University =

RAU Business School
- Russian-Armenian University Business School
- Type: Public
- Established: 2008
- Location: (Armenia) Yerevan, Armenia
- Website: http://www.bs.rau.am/

Russian-Armenian University Business School (RAU Business school) (Russian: Бизнес-школа Российско-Армянского университета; Armenian: Հայ-ռուսական համալսարանի Բիզնես դպրոց), founded in 2008, is the graduate business school of Russian-Armenian (Slavonic) University in Yerevan, Armenia. The school offers a variety of educational programs like MBA programs and many Professional Courses.

In 2016 RAU Business school entered the international ranking list of Eduniversal of the best business schools in the world.

== History ==
RAU Business School was formally established as a separate unit in 2008. It is a dynamically evolving, licensed educational institution in the field of business education and was a member of the Central and East European Management Development Association (CEEMAN), which employs a modern approach to the methodology and quality in business education. The Business School offers academic postgraduate as well as professional business training and development programs. During last three years RAU Business School has established partner relations with several esteemed and well known institutions such as: University of Glasgow (Scotland); SBS Swiss Business School (Switzerland); Stockholm School of Economy (Riga branch); ISET (Georgia); Central European University (Slovakia); International University (Vienna); and many others in Kazakhstan, Ukraine, and more than 40 of the biggest universities in Russia.

== Programs ==
RAU Business School offers a variety of educational programs.

=== Professional Courses ===
- Basics of Investment and Capital Markets
- Business law
- Business Process Management
- Communication and Negotiation Skills
- Crisis Management
- Customer Relationship Management
- Economics for Business
- Financial Management
- Financial Markets and Institutions
- General Accounting
- Human Resources Management
- Leadership
- Marketing Management
- Marketing of the 21st Century
- Megaeconomics
- Public Relations
- Quality Assurance Management
- Risk Management
- Statistical Analysis
- Strategic Management
- Taxation

== See also ==
- Russian-Armenian (Slavonic) University
- SBS Swiss Business School
