= St. Hopkins College =

Business school in Bangalore, India

- Type: Private business school
- Established: 2009
- Founder: Yunus Ahmed
- Affiliations: Bangalore University
- Location: (India) Bangalore, Karnataka, India; 12.951179°N 77.604011°E
- Campus: Urban
- Language: English, Kannada, Hindi, Sanskrit, French
- Website: St. Hopkins College

St. Hopkins College is a business school located in Bangalore, India. It was founded by Yunus Ahmed in 2009 and is a minority institution approved by the National Commission for Minority Educational Institutions, the University Grants Commission of India and the National Assessment and Accreditation Council. St. Hopkins is affiliated to the University of Bangalore and the Government of Karnataka.

== Courses offered ==
=== Undergraduate program ===
St. Hopkins offers courses and programs for the B.B.M., B.Com, B.C.A. and B.A. There are also pre-university courses.

=== Graduate program ===
Postgraduate courses offered include:

- M.Com
- MBA in Finance
- MBA in Human Resource Management
- MBA in Retail
- MBA in Marketing
- MBA in Business Analytics
- MBA in Information Technology
- International MBA (6 weeks abroad)
- Postgraduate Diploma in Business Analytics

=== Collaborations ===
- Bangalore University
- Mysore University
- Naukri for Placements

== Activities ==
St. Hopkins College organizes UDAAN, an annual cultural fest held at the college campus, followed by inter-class sports competition.

The Boys Football team has won the Karnataka State Football Tournament.
