= Pratap University =

- Type: Private
- Established: 2011
- Location: Jaipur, Rajasthan, India
- Website: Official website

Pratap University is a Private university located in Jaipur, Rajasthan, India. It was established in the year 1995. The founder of the university is Shri Ram Singh Bhadauria.

== Notable alumni ==
- Nishikant Dubey
