= Indian Institute of Management Rohtak =

Business school in India

- Motto: ज्ञानेन गुणेन च प्रबंधः
- Motto in English: Management Through Knowledge and Values
- Type: Public business school
- Established: 2010; 16 years ago
- Accreditation: AMBA
- Affiliations: Indian Institutes of Management
- Chairman: J. D. Shroff
- Director: Dheeraj Sharma
- Location: Rohtak, Haryana, 124001, India; 28°51′10.1″N 76°32′49.5″E
- Language: English
- Colours: Red Green
- Nickname: Kathor (anadrome of Rohtak)
- Website: www.iimrohtak.ac.in

Indian Institute of Management Rohtak (IIM Rohtak) is a public business school located in Rohtak, Haryana, India. As one of India's premier Indian Institutes of Management, the school has been accorded the status of an Institute of National Importance.

IIM Rohtak was established in the year 2010 as one of the six new IIMs announced under the 11th Five Year Plan. It offers mainly five courses, an Integrated Programs in Management (IPM), Integrated Program in Law (IPL), the Post-Graduate Program (PGP) in Management, Executive Post Graduate Program for Executives (EPGPX) and Doctoral Program in Management (DPM).

It offers under-graduate and post graduate diploma, IPM Program, fellowship and executive program in management. The institute has taken many entrepreneurial and social initiatives since its inception. The institute also offers since 2018 a unique one of its kind Integrated Program in Management (IPM) that is designed for young minds as soon as they complete their high school. This program aims to make the student best manager by teaching various subjects with practical knowledge in a span of 5 years. The Institute also provides an option for students to quit after 3 years with a BBA degree in case they want to switch to any other college for further studies. In the year 2021, the Institute started an Integrated Program in Law under which, students are nurtured to become managers with legal education in the lines of the Harvard Business School. It is the first and currently the only IIM to offer a Law degree. The students are provided with an BBA-LLB degree after five years of academic tutoring under the IPL program. IIM Rohtak is ranked 151 globally and 12th nationally for its MBA program. It is now the largest IIM.

== History ==
In 1959, Planning Commission of India invited Professor George Robbins of UCLA to help set up an institute of management studies to meet the demand for managers in public sector enterprises. As a result, IIM Calcutta and IIM Ahmedabad were established in 1961 and 1962 respectively. To study the performance of these institutions, IIM Review Committees were formed in 1981, 1992 and 2004 and each time these committees recommended setting up of newer IIMs which increased the number of IIMs to seven by 2007.

In 2007, Ministry of Human Resource Development proposed setting up of seven new IIMs as a part of the 11th Five Year Plan. The proposal was also endorsed by National Development Council. 4 IIMs were supposed to be set up in 2009 in the first phase with the rest 3 being set up in 2010 in the second phase. However, because of infrastructural issues, only two out of the four IIMs could start functioning with IIM Rohtak commencing its classes from June 2010 and IIM Ranchi commencing its classes from July 2010.

Foundation of IIM Rohtak was laid on 16 November 2009, thus becoming the only IIM in National Capital Region. P. Rameshan, the then dean of academic administration at IIM Kozhikode was appointed as the first director of IIM Rohtak with IIM Lucknow serving as the mentor institution for the first three years. Ravi Kant, former Managing Director of Tata Motors, joined as the Chairman of the Institute. A memorandum of understanding was signed with Maharshi Dayanand University, Rohtak to serve as the transit campus for the first five years and the first batch started in June 2010 with a strength of 50 students. Prof Dheeraj Sharma was appointed Director in 2017. Since 2017, the number of students have increased from approx 300 to approx 1500 in 2021. The Haryana Government provided 200 acres of land for the permanent campus and the foundation stone was laid by the then Minister of HRD, Kapil Sibal. Institute continued to remain in MDU campus. The entire campus was completed between 2017-2019

== Campus ==
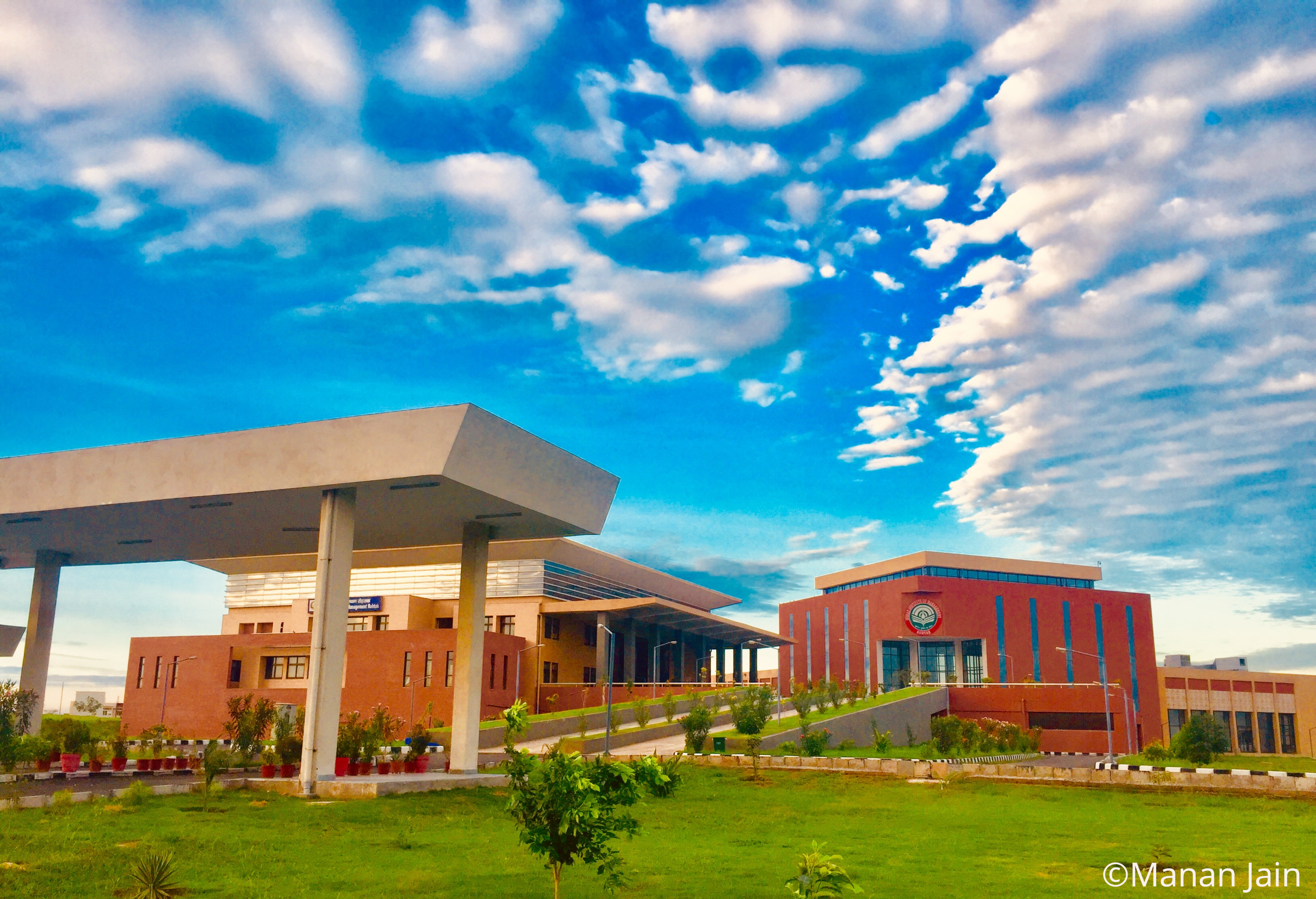
IIM Rohtak main academic block

The permanent campus of IIM Rohtak was initially planned to come up at the Garnawati Village near Rohtak, 82 kilometres (51 mi) from the Delhi Airport, but the land was covered under the Forest Act and the Forest Ministry objected to setting up of a campus in the forest area. As the construction was getting delayed, the Haryana government transferred 200 acres of land from the Sunaria village for the construction in 2011. The design of the campus has been assigned to Design Accord. In 2017, Dheeraj Sharma, the newly appointed director of IIM Rohtak announced plans to set up a satellite campus in Gurgaon.

The institute is currently functioning in its permanent campus, known as Management City, located at NH-10, Southern Bye-Pass, Sunaria. The campus is spread over a total area of approximately 200 acres. All the infrastructure facilities are available to IIM Rohtak. The Management City has three different blocks; Administration, Academics and Residential. The Academic block is itself divided into two sub-blocks, one for the IPM Programme, and the other for the PGP programme. The Knowledge Resource Centre, an open for all, 24/7 library, is a member of IIM Libraries Consortium and in March 2016, had a collection of more than 5000 books and had online subscriptions to more than 57 print journals, magazines and 35 e-databases. The buildings in the campus are connected through a fiber optic backbone network which is controlled by the IT Resources Centre. The centre also maintains other services like the e-mail server, online learning system and intranet portal. The Institute has a Finance Lab which is equipped with 12 Bloomberg Terminals.

Other than the administrative and academic blocks, the campus has various residential buildings. There are two hostels that have been dedicated for the IPM Batch. Other than the two, there are over 15 housing complexes for the PGP, FPM and the ePGP students. The institute also has a seminar hall with a seating capacity for 1000 people, which stands as the main venue for all the management and cultural events are held in the college. The campus has facilities for cricket, football, basketball, volleyball, badminton, table tennis and athletics. A fully functional Student Activity Centre was inaugurated in 2019, which consists of a fully-equipped gymnasium, three indoor badminton courts and also houses the Medical Inspection Room.

== Organisation and administration ==
=== Governance ===
IIM Rohtak is an autonomous institution established by Ministry of Human Resource Development as a registered society and governed by its own Board of Governors. The board consists of a Chairman, 2 representatives of the Government of India, 2 representatives of the Government of Haryana, one representative each of AICTE, JNU and AIMA in addition to one academician and the Director of the institute. The Director of the institute is appointed by the Appointments Committee of the Cabinet. Ravi Kant has been chairman of the board since its inception, while P. Rameshan was the first director of the institute. Dheeraj Sharma joined as the second full-time director in March 2017. Entire rohtak campus and all new programs started under the leadership of Prof Sharma.

== Academic profile ==
=== Programmes offered ===
IIM Rohtak offers full-time MBA, executive post graduate diploma, fellowship, executive fellowship and other short duration professional development programmes in management. In common with other IIMs, IIM Rohtak used to offer diplomas and not degrees. IIM Rohtak, along with other IIMs, has started offering an MBA degree, instead of a PGDM starting with the batch of 2018..

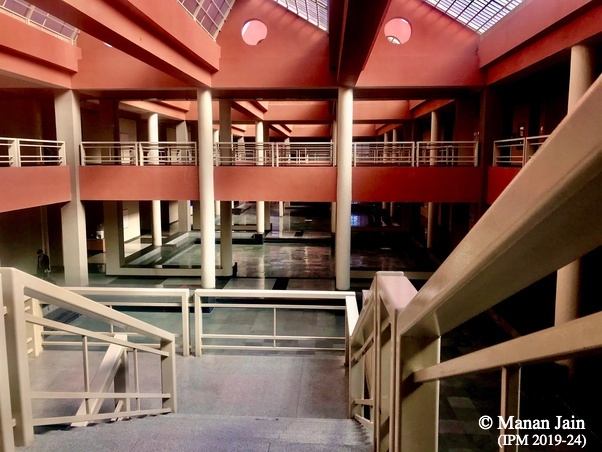
Inside view of IIM Rohtak Academic Block

IIM Rohtak also provides a Five-Year Integrated Programme in Management (IPM), following in the footsteps of IIM Indore, for students after class XII who aim to pursue their career in Business Management. This programme was introduced in 2019, and is only the second IIM to do so, after IIM Indore which has a BA+MBA program. IIM Rohtak is the first IIM to have BBA+MBA integrated program. It is a comprehensive management program that has a combined course of management studies from under-graduate (UG) to postgraduate (PG). The programme aims at molding young students into future managers and leaders.

IIM Rohtak provides another Five-Year Integrated Programme in Law (IPL) as well, being the first IIM to start this. This programme is also for students after class XII and is a BBA-LLB program. This programme is affiliated and recognised by BCI (Bar Council of India) and the entire programme consists of courses in Business Management and Legal Education.

On successful completion of the academic rigor of 5 years, the participant will be awarded Master of Business Administration (MBA) by IIM Rohtak. If any student intends to exit after successfully completing the programme requirement at the end of 3 years, he/she will be awarded a degree of Bachelor of Business Administration (BBA). The programme consists of 15 terms spread over a period of 5 years. A year has three terms, a trimester system, each trimester of 3 months duration. The entire programme is divided into two parts; the first part focuses on the foundation courses, whereas the second part focuses on the management. Students will be undergoing internships at the end of every academic year. At the end of the first year, students undergo a social/rural internship for a period of 8–10 weeks. For the second year, students will undergo internships inside the campus itself, and the third year will see the students undergoing corporate internships.

Post Graduate Programme in Management (PGP) is a two-year full-time residential programme, equivalent to an MBA. Post completion of first year, students are expected to undergo a summer internship of 8 weeks in a company or an organisation. In the second year of the programme, students can choose their own focused field of study. Post Graduate Programme in Management for Executives (ePGPx) is a distance learning programme for working executives and is spread over one year.

Doctoral Programme in Management (DPM), formerly known as FPM, is a four-year Doctor of Business Administration programme started in 2013 and Executive Fellowship Programme in Management (EFPM) is a Doctor of Business Administration programme for working executives.

=== Admissions ===
The students keen to apply for IPM Programme will undergo a rigorous selection process. Admission for the IPM Programme is through a three-stage process. In the first stage, applicants are required to clear an online aptitude test which is composed of questions from Mathematics, English and Logical Reasoning. Applicants scoring well are then selected for a single day, two-stage selection process. First, a Written Aptitude Test is conducted, after which Personal Interviews are conducted where candidates are questioned upon past academic performance, interests, strengths, work ethics and why they chose this course.

Admission to the PGDM Programme is done through the Common Admission Test (CAT), which is jointly conducted by the IIMs in the month of November every year. Candidates are invited for a Written Analysis and Personal Interview on the basis of their performance in CAT. The final selection of the candidates is based upon their CAT score, past academic performance, work experience and performance in the Written Analysis and Personal Interview. Admission to ePGPx is done through written test conducted by IIM Rohtak and personal interview. Students with a valid GRE, GMAT or CAT score can apply on the basis of their respective score.

Admission to FPM is done on the basis of marks scored by a candidate in CAT, GMAT, GRE, JRF or GATE. The specializations offered are Business Environment, Finance, General Management, Human Resources, Information Technology, Marketing, Operations and Strategy. Starting 2016, interdisciplinary specialization was available in Retail Management and Logistics and Supply Chain Management.

=== Collaborations ===
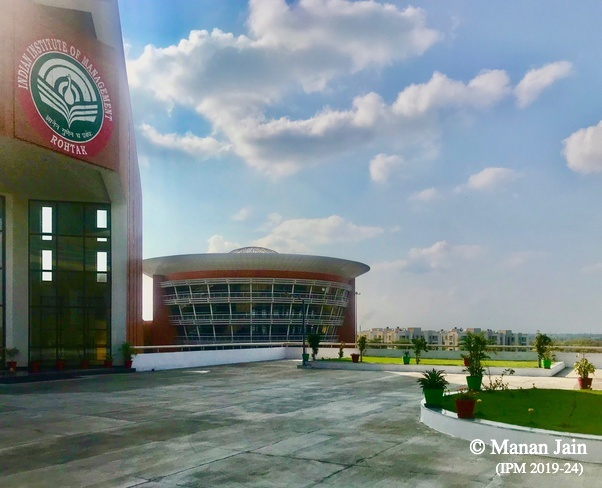
Library and Academic Block

In September 2011, IIM Rohtak signed an MoU with the Kelley School of Business, Indiana University for organising joint research projects and academic programmes besides faculty and student exchanges. In 2012, IIM Rohtak became the fifth IIM to get a membership of the Association to Advance Collegiate Schools of Business (AACSB). The Institute also signed MoUs with Singapore Management University for visiting faculty and scholars, and with California State University, Fullerton for setting up center of excellence at each institution in 2013.

=== Entrepreneurship ===
The Entrepreneurship Cell of the Institute was set up in July 2014 by the students of IIM Rohtak. The cell has signed an MoA with the National Backward Classes Finance and Development Corporation (NBCFDC) for the development of skills of entrepreneurs from backward classes.

The Bizdome Incubation Council was launched in 2015 as a business incubator. Ashutosh Garg, founder and chairman of Guardian Pharmacy joined as chairman of the council in 2016. The council was identified as one of the 18 technology business incubators to be scaled up as per the funding model of the Department of Science and Technology, India as a part of the Startup Action Plan. In 2017, Uni-Solar became the first startup by an IIM Rohtak alumnus to be incubated by Bizdome.

=== Rankings ===
University rankings

Business/Management – India
- NIRF (2023): 16

IIM Rohtak was ranked 12th in management ranking by the National Institutional Ranking Framework (NIRF) in 2023.

=== Awards ===
Recognised as an Institute of Excellence by MHRD, IIM Rohtak was awarded by DNA for innovations in teaching methodology in 2014. It was also awarded the "Top Institute of India" by Competition Success Review twice, in 2014 and 2015.

On account of many institutes misreporting their placement data, IIM Rohtak adopted Indian Placement Reporting Standards (IPRS) framework in 2016 becoming the second IIM (after IIM Ahmedabad) to get its placement reports audited by CRISIL.

== Research ==
As of April 2018, faculty members of IIM Rohtak have published over 160 papers in international journals and have presented more than 70 papers at international management conferences, primarily in United States and Australia, since the beginning of the academic curriculum in 2010. In a survey published by Elsevier on research productivity in management schools, IIM Rohtak was ranked 7th, and 3 of the faculty members were among the top 5% most productive researchers in India.

Emerging Economies Cases Journal, published in collaboration with Sage Publishing and IIM Rohtak, focuses on case studies highlighting challenges and opportunities in emerging economies.

== Student life ==
=== Clubs and committees ===
IIM Rohtak has a total of 13 committees and 10 clubs. Committees are institute sponsored student societies responsible for supporting the administration in carrying out non-academic activities related to the institute. Public Relations Cell is responsible for promotion and brand building. In 2016, it was awarded at the Social Media for Empowerment Awards for "building goodwill and creating positive word of mouth without biases, comparisons and self-proclamation." A Placement Committee is in place for carrying out placement activities. It publishes the annual institute placement report. The Alumni Committee is responsible for organizing alumni engagement activities, and the Entrepreneurship Cell is responsible for promoting entrepreneurship and organizing related activities.

Other committees include the Academic Committee for academic matters, Cultural Committee for cultural activities, Elections & Auditing Committee for auditing and conducting elections of the student body, a Hospitality Committee for managing the student mess, Industrial Relations & Interaction Cell for corporate engagement, IT Committee for IT related matters, Sports Committee for sports activities, a Student Council for coordination between clubs and a Preparation Committee for skill development.

The introduction of the IPM Programme saw the birth of five new clubs, built for the IPM batch itself- Academic club, Sports Club, Literature and Photography Club, Social Welfare Club and the Cultural Club. The clubs are headed by the IPM students themselves, and the subsequent members are chosen based on interviews and past experience in the respective fields they want to join. Under the leadership of Prof Sharma, Director, beti bachao, beti padhao yojana program was launched in 2017, since then IIM Rohtak has increased percentage of women in its flagship program from 6% in 2016 to 50% in 2017 to 70% in 2020. ,

The Clubs for the PGP and others are self sponsored special interest groups focusing on a specific area of knowledge or interest. The different clubs are the FI Club (Finance & Investment), Humane-R Club (Human Resources), ITernity Club (Information Technology), Marque Club (Marketing), Supply Chain & Operations Management Club, Strategy & Consulting Club, Swaniti (Public Policy Club), exploR Club (Film and Photography), InQUIZire Club (Quizzing), Social Development Projects Cell and Voice Club (Public Speaking).

=== Corporate events ===
ManCon is the annual management conclave organised by IIM Rohtak since 2011. Organised in November every year by Industrial Relations & Interaction Cell, the two-day event involves panel discussions on various business related topics. Udaan is the annual entrepreneurship summit organised by Entrepreneurship Cell of IIM Rohtak. It involves keynote speeches, panel discussions and Ignitus, a business plan competition. exploR Club organised the first edition of its Film Summit in 2016. It involved keynote speeches on various aspects of filmmaking such as direction, screenwriting, marketing, etc. IIM Rohtak also organises a lot of annual conventions such as HR Summit, CXO Summit and Outstation Conclave.

=== The 7th PAN-IIM World Management Conference ===
Initiated by the Ministry of Human Resource Development and Indian Institutes of Management (IIMs), the PAN-IIM WMC aims to create a forum where the best minds of the country and the world to come together to create an opportunity to deliberate on current issues of management, initiate collaborative efforts, and contribute to the existing knowledge pool. The Seventh PAN-IIM World Management Conference (WMC) was hosted by the Indian Institute of Management, Rohtak from 12 to 14 December at the United Service Institution of India, New Delhi, and aimed at bringing researchers, academicians, practitioners, and policymakers together to meet the constantly changing challenges of public policy and management. The three-day conference offered publication opportunities, special workshops, plenary sessions, and roundtables with leading scholars in the field. the theme for the conference was chosen to be Public Policy and Management: Emerging Issues. The conference saw a record number of papers submitted, the highest for any PAN-IIM under the leadership of Prof Sharma.

Extended Abstracts of original research papers and teaching cases were invited on the conference theme and in all areas of management including:

- Economics
- Finance and Accounting
- Management Information Systems
- Marketing Management
- Organization Behaviour and Human Resources Management
- Operations Management & Quantitative Techniques
- Strategy

=== Cultural events ===
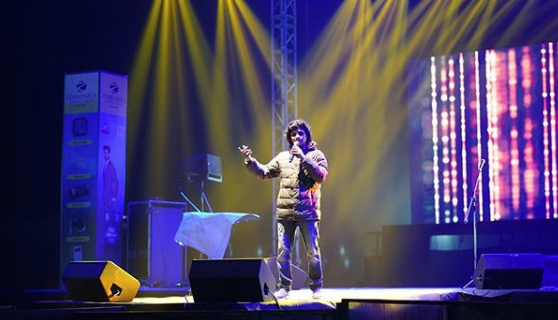
Rahul Subramanian at Infusion 2020

Infusion is the annual cultural, management and sports festival of IIM Rohtak. The two-day event consists of inter-college case study competitions, Model United Nations, Mock Stock, quizzes and various other sports and cultural events.

IIM Rohtak organises a mini marathon every year on the theme India for Girl Child to raise awareness about gender equality. So many students as well as adults participate in the event. Started in 2011, it consists of three events: 10 kilometres marathon for men, 5 kilometres marathon for women and 3 kilometres for children. The first edition of the mini marathon saw a participation of more than 2000 people. A flash mob is also organised every year to promote different causes.

From 2015, IIM Rohtak has also started organising its own TEDx conference, TEDxIIMRohtak.

== Social initiatives ==
The Social Development Project Cell (SDPC), is responsible for taking social initiatives through its two arms; Every Child in School (ECIS) and Sparsh. Sparsh organises awareness activities throughout the year such as career counseling, blood donation camps, free medical check ups and cleanliness campaigns in government schools. Under the 'Swabhav' initiative, members of Sparsh developed a self-sustaining model to finance the education of girl students in Rohtak city.

IIM Rohtak also conducts annual internships for the youth of Jammu and Kashmir under the special initiative of Prof. Dheeraj Sharma. The project aims at empowering the young women of Kashmir. So far, over 100 female students of J & K have received internship from IIM Rohtak.

== Controversies ==
In March 2025, President Droupadi Murmu approved a probe against IIM Rohtak and its director over allegations of financial bungling and misrepresenting his educational qualifications.

== See also ==
- List of MBA schools in India
