= KIIT School of Management =

Business school in Bhubaneswar, Orrisa, India

Coordinates: 20.205980°N 85.491365°E

KIIT School of Management, Bhubaneswar
- Type: Private
- Established: 1993
- Founder: Achyuta Samanta
- Parent institution: Kalinga Institute of Industrial Technology
- Chancellor: Ashok Kumar Parija
- Vice-Chancellor: Saranjit Singh
- Dean: Sumita Mishra
- Director: Suvokant Mohanty
- Location: Bhubaneswar, Odisha, India
- Campus: Urban
- Website: www.ksom.ac.in
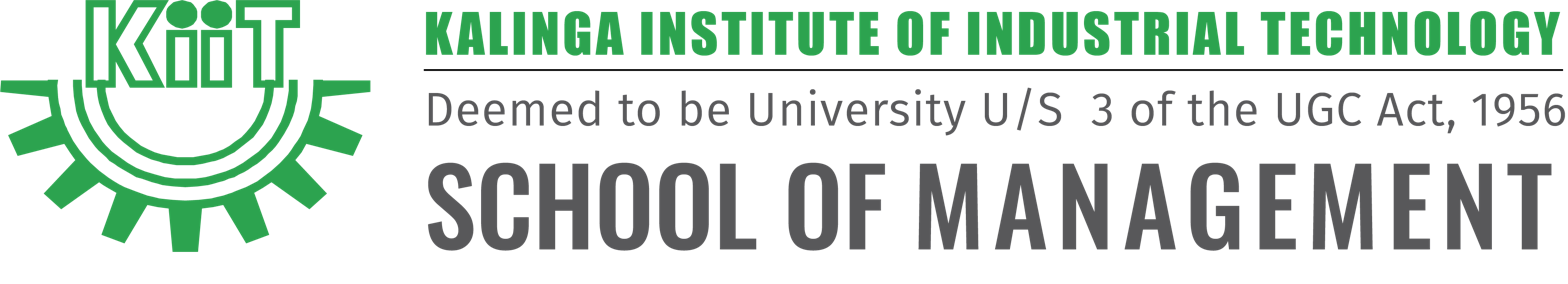

KIIT School of Management (KSOM) is a private business school located in Bhubaneswar, Odisha, India. It was established in 1993 as the Institute of Business Administration and Training. It is a constituent institute of Kalinga Institute of Industrial Technology.

KIIT School of Management is one of the 10 private institutes in India and the only one in Odisha to get "Institution of Eminence" tag from UGC, MHRD, Govt. of India.

The institute was accredited by National Assessment and Accreditation Council in 'A' grade. It offers the two-year Master of Business Administration (MBA) program along with a Bachelor of Business Administration (BBA) and a doctoral program in Management. The institute also regularly conducts Management Development programs for working executives.

The institute conducts its own national-level entrance examination called KIITEE Management held in January each year. It also accepts CAT, GMAT, CMAT, MAT and ATMA scores for admission.

== History ==
The school was founded in 1993 as Institute of Business Administration and Training by Pradyumna Kishore Bal, an eminent thinker and pioneer of value-based journalism. The institute started a two-year post-graduate diploma in Management with an annual intake of 60 students in a rented building in Nayapalli, Bhubaneswar, which were revised to 120 seats in the year 2002. Later on in 2004, it was affiliated to Kalinga Institute of Industrial Technology.

The successive directors of KSOM were Arindam Banerjee, M.L. Monga, Ramesh Chandra Pani, D.V. Ramana, Govind Rajan, H.R. Machiraju, L.K. Vaswani and Deepak Gandhi, Anil Bajpai and Debasis Das. As of August 2019, Prof. Anil Bajpai is the director and Prof. Satya Narayan Misra the current dean.

The Ministry of Human Resource Development (MHRD), Govt. of India has placed Kalinga Institute of Industrial Technology in the list of Category ‘A’ Deemed Universities on the basis of Tandon Committee recommendations.

== Rankings ==
Institute rankings

Business/Management – India
- NIRF (2021): 31
- Private colleges
- Outlook India (2020): 11

KIIT was ranked 31 amongst management schools in India by the National Institutional Ranking Framework (NIRF) in 2021 and 11 in India by Outlook India's "Top 150 Private MBA Institutions" of 2020.

== Collaborations ==
KSOM has established academic partnership with several organisations:

- Dassault Systèmes (DS) – A Center for Building Competence in Product Lifecycle Management has been established under the partnership with Dassault Systèmes to focus on building manpower for managing the engineering and technological needs of the Indian industry.
- SAP University Alliances – KSOM has entered into an alliance with SAP University Alliance Program to provide SAP education to MBA students.
- SHRM India – KSOM recently signed an MoU with SHRM India to accelerate the overall development of all MBA Students through 100 hours of engagement in small groups as well as in one-to-one interaction with broad range of experienced experts from the industry for onc complete year. The engagements would broadly cover development of general management skills; development of functional skills; and development of soft skills
- Tech Mahindra – KSOM recently signed an MoU with Tech Mahindra to conceptualize research projects, share information and technology to develop required skills and execute projects
- NHRD – KSOM has association with NHRD (National Human Resource Development Network) for event partnership & conclaves in HR area.

== See also ==
- List of business schools in India
