= KV Institute of Management and Information Studies =

KV Institute of Management and Information Studies (Autonomous)
- Motto: Grooming Leaders of Tomorrow
- Type: Private
- Established: 2008
- Accreditation: NAAC
- Affiliations: Anna University
- Principal: M. Vidhya
- Location: Coimbatore, Tamil Nadu, 641107, India
- Website: kvimis.co.in

KV Institute of Management and Information Studies (KVIMIS), also known as KVIM Business School or simply KVIM, is an autonomous private business school located in Coimbatore, Tamil Nadu, India. KVIM was founded in 2008 and is affiliated with Anna University.

The B-school offers MBA programme with multiple specializations including Marketing, Finance, Human Resource Management, Operations, Business Analytics, Logistics and Supply Chain Management, Infrastructure and Real Estate Management, Tourism Management, and Entrepreneurship.

== Industry Institute Interface ==
KVIM's Centre for Industry Institute Interface (CI3) with more than 150 partnerships in national and international avenues, arranges for elite interactions between the students and the corporate leaders of India and abroad related to Internships, Placements and Industrial visits. Industry takes a bigger role in setting curriculum and in mutual training with the fraternity.
