= Comteq Computer and Business College =

Private college in Olongapo, Philippines

- Type: Private
- Established: 1997
- President: Prof. Danny Piano
- Location: Olongapo City, Zambales, Philippines; 14°49′51″N 120°16′58″E
- Campus: 63 Fendler St, East Tapinac, Olongapo City, Philippines
- Website: www.comteq.edu.ph
- Location in Luzon Location in the Philippines

COMTEQ Computer and Business College in Olongapo City, Philippines, is a non-stock, non-profit educational institution mainly focusing on IT studies and business-related learning that offers its services chiefly to students from the Olongapo, Zambales and Bataan areas.

== History ==
COMTEQ was originally founded as an institution teaching computer literacy courses to high school students. The school was later incorporated and proceeded to offer two-year computer courses from rented premises at National Highway, Kalaklan, Olongapo City with fewer than 100 students.

The student population grew to about 150+ and the courses offered became more varied, to include four-year bachelor's degree courses. Realizing the need for better facilities and more space, COMTEQ moved inside the Subic Bay Freeport.

In late 2010, after the Subic Bay Metropolitan Authority decided to use the school lot as space for a new shopping mall, SBMA transferred COMTEQ to Bldg Q-8131 where they share the location with the University of the Philippines Diliman Extension Program in Olongapo. In December 2017, COMTEQ transferred to where they are closer and more accessible by the majority of their more than 500 students at 1200 Rizal Avenue. East Tapinac, Olongapo City, 8 years after, the management of COMTEQ have decided to transfer to its new building at same Barangay, but near Magsaysay Ave. Currently, COMTEQ is located at #63 Fendler St. East Tapinac, OLongapo City.

== Programs offered ==
Colleges

College of Computer Studies

- Bachelor of Computer Science, BSCS, 4-year
- Bachelor of Science in Information Technology, BSIT, 4-year
- Associate in Computer Technology, ACT, 2-year

College of Business and Accountancy

- Bachelor of Science in Business Administration Major in Human Resource Management, BSBA-HRM, 4-year
- Bachelor of Science in Business Administration Major in Operations Management, BSBA-OM, 4-year
- Bachelor of Science in Accountancy, BSA, 4-year

Technical-Vocational Education and Training (TVET)

- Computer Systems Servicing NC II
- Trainer's Methodology 1

Senior High School Programs:

    Academic Track
         * Accounting and Business Management (ABM)
         * Humanities and Social Sciences (Humms)
    Technical Vocational (tech-voc) Livelihood Track
         * Information and Communications Technology (ICT)
              - Computer Systems Servicing, formerly Computer Hardware Servicing 
         * Industrial Arts, NC-II
              - Electronic Products Assembly and Servicing, formerly Consumers Electronics Servicing
         * Home Economics
              - Food and Beverage Services, NC-II
              - Front Office Services, NC-II
              - Housekeeping, NC-II
              - Bartending, NC-II

== Major Awards ==
- COMTEQ Recently participated in the recently concluded World Skills - ASEAN competition, hosted by the Philippines.
- TESDA I.T. Skills Provincial, Regional, and National Competition Medalist (since 2013 to date).
- Globe G-nius National Winner
- PRISAA Provincial Basketball Champion (2014, 2015, 2016, 2017, 2018)
- 1st SBFCC League Champion
