= Indian Institute of Social Welfare and Business Management =

Management Institution in West Bengal

- Asia's 1st Management Institute
- Type: Public business school
- Established: 25 April 1953; 73 years ago
- Founder: Bidhan Chandra Roy
- Academic affiliations: University of Calcutta; AICTE
- Budget: ₹17 crore (US$1.8 million) (FY2024–25 est.)
- President: Sujit K. Basu
- Director: Dr. K. M. Agrawal
- Academic staff: 55 (2025)
- Students: 559 (2025)
- Postgraduates: 482 (2025)
- Doctoral students: 77 (2025)
- Location: Kolkata, India; 22°34′34.26″N 88°21′38.86″E
- Campus: 1,786 m^{2} (19,220 sq ft); Urban
- Website: www.iiswbm.edu

The Indian Institute of Social Welfare & Business Management (IISWBM) is an Autonomous business school in Kolkata, India. The school is one of the first management institutes in India and South East Asia. The institute currently offers several postgraduate degree programmes under the University of Calcutta as well as the PhD programme. The list includes MBA (Day), MBA (Evening) for Working Professionals, MBA-HRM, MBA-Public Systems, Masters in Social Welfare and several Post Graduate Diploma programmes. The institute publishes a management journal called Survey.

== History ==
In 1942, during the Second World War, the British government sought to train qualified labour officers for its industrial facilities, especially ordnance factories. To fulfill this need, a social welfare training institute was established nearby in affiliation with Calcutta University. Following India's Independence, this initiative evolved into the Indian Institute of Social Welfare and Business Management (IISWBM), Kolkata, officially established on 25 April 1953 by a resolution passed by the Senate of the University of Calcutta. It was a collaborative effort between the University of Calcutta, the Government of West Bengal, and the Government of India. The first prime minister of India, Pandit Jawaharlal Nehru, laid its cornerstone. IISWBM was the nation's first institution to offer a formal management education program, with Dijendra Kumar Sanyal serving as its founder-director. The institute launched the nation's first Sports Management course.

Multi-Campus Infrastructure

The institute is implementing a multi-phased expansion strategy to enhance its academic reach and infrastructure. By establishing new campuses in Rajarhat, Salt Lake, and Siliguri, the institute aims to address both urban capacity constraints and regional economic requirements.

In Kolkata, the Rajarhat and Salt Lake projects, representing a combined investment of approximately ₹150 crore, are designed to facilitate a transition toward university status. These facilities are intended to provide residential infrastructure and research space for greater academic autonomy. The Siliguri campus is planned to offer specialized programs in tourism and public systems tailored to the North Bengal economy.

Demand for University

In August 2017, Chief Minister Mamata Banerjee suggested that IISWBM be upgraded to a university. In 2019, the alumni association also demanded university or deemed university status for IISWBM.

== Rankings ==
IISWBM was ranked 22nd in the 2025 Outlook BSchools ranking. It was ranked 34th among management schools in India by Business Today in 2014. In the Economic Times B-School Survey, IISWBM was ranked 33rd in Human Resource Management and 37th overall.

== Distinguished Alumni ==
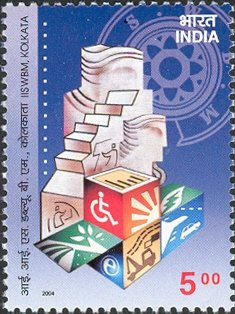
Indian Institute of Social Welfare and Business Management Stamp of India - 2004

Alumni of the Indian Institute of Social Welfare and Business Management (IISWBM) have held positions in corporations, public institutions, academia, and creative industries.

=== Corporate & Global Business Leaders ===
- Lakshmi N. Mittal – Chairman & CEO, ArcelorMittal
- Satyaki Ghosh – CEO, Domestic Textiles, Aditya Birla Group
- Shantanu Banerjee – Chief Human Resources Officer, Bandhan Bank
- Srirang T K – Group CHRO, ICICI Bank
- Nisith Chaturvedi – Chief of HR & Administration, National Payments Corporation of India (NPCI)
- Pramit Sen – Chief Human Resources Officer, National Securities Depository Ltd (NSDL)
- Ritu Lohia – President, Jupiter Wagons

=== Industry Leaders & Business Excellence ===
- C. V. Chandrasekharan – Former Managing Director, Balmer Lawrie Group
- Umesh Hota – Executive Vice President (HR, CSR & Administration), KCB India Limited
- Samit Chakrabarti – Executive Director, Cantor
- Abhijan Nandy – Managing Director & CEO, Allindia Technologies Ltd
- Dhruba Mukherjee – CEO, ABP Private Limited
- Shikha Gupta – Director – HR & DEI, India & South Asia, Schneider Electric

=== Media, Entrepreneurship & Creative Industries ===
- Bhaskar Das – Former Executive Director, The Times of India
- Debaditya Chaudhury – Restaurateur; Owner, Oudh 1590 & Chowman
- Arindam Sil – Film Director

=== Academia & Thought Leadership ===
- Sumantra Ghoshal – Former Professor, London Business School

=== Governance & Social Impact ===
- Sudhir Jalan – Former President, AIMA; Former President, FICCI
- Pooja Panja – Councillor, Kolkata Municipal Corporation
- Suman Bhattacharya – Program Director, Piramal Foundation

== See also ==
- List of colleges affiliated to the University of Calcutta
- Education in India
- Education in West Bengal
