= Department of Business Economics (University of Delhi) =

Department of Business Economics, University of Delhi
- Motto: निष्ठा धति: सत्यम्
- Type: Public
- Established: 1973
- Affiliations: UGC
- Chancellor: Vice-President of India
- Head: Prof. SC Aggarwal
- Location: Delhi, India
- Campus: Urban
- Website: mbe-du.org

Founded in 1973, the University of Delhi's Department of Business Economics pioneered the Masters Program in Business Economics, MBA (Business Economics, patterned on a similar program conducted by Harvard Business School.

== Courses ==
The flagship business program at this niche business school is its two-year full-time MBA in Business Economics. This niche business school further offers Marketing, Finance and Econometrics majors or specializations. New papers on Global Finance, Business Policy, Environment Economics and Resource Management and Economics of Services have been included as the syllabus was further revised in 2010 to include various other domains of business.

The department offers M Phil and Ph.D. programs to which admissions are made in accordance with the rules of the University of Delhi. The department introduced, with effect from 1995–96, an undergraduate Honors Course in Business Economics in selected colleges of the University of Delhi. An updated syllabus was implemented from the academic year 2003. Workshops are organized to strengthen the teaching.

== MBA (Business Economics)* ==
The MBA in Business Economics (erstwhile MBE) is a two-year, full-time course offering a dual major or specialization to students. Students are given a grounding in fundamentals of micro and macro economics and quantitative techniques - business statistics. These are coupled with specializations in the fields of quantitative techniques/finance/marketing/human resources systems and operations/regional and transport economics/ and applied environmental economics.

Offerings by the department are industrial economics - teaching students to basics of structure-conduct-performance paradigm; basics of transfer pricing; M&As etc., Economics of services - study of growing importance of the service sector in modern economies across the world; detailed study of four major global services, Economics of environment and natural resources management - schooling students in contemporary practices such as carbon credits).

Since this is a niche business school batch intake is a very selective ~40 students which allows for a well-knit cohort, yet access to the huge infrastructure of the University of Delhi especially its South Campus where the Department is located. The program has tie-ups with various international universities and exchange programs in the past.

Notable alumni across organizations in Finance, Marketing, Consulting & Economics. Recent years have however seen a distinctive trend for students to opt for careers in Analytics & Consulting, BFSI & Financial markets, Marketing Strategy & Market research and Economic Research.

Assignments require the analysis of data from sources such as the World Bank and IMF, case studies, and presentations.
