= Seoul School of Integrated Sciences and Technologies =

Seoul Business School at aSSIST University
- Type: • Private • Graduate School
- Established: 1995
- Location: Seoul, South Korea
- Website: www.en.assist.ac.kr

Seoul Business School at aSSIST University offers graduate degrees (Masters and Doctorate) in partnership with other universities around the globe such as Aalto University (A!), Stony Brook University (SBU), Franklin University Switzerland (FUS), Middlesex University (MU), Business School of Lausanne (BSL), and Cheung Kong Graduate School of Business (CKGSB).
