= Mumbai Educational Trust =

Indian academic institution

Mumbai Educational Trust – MET League of Colleges
- Type: Private Educational Institute
- Established: 1989
- Location: Mumbai, Maharashtra, India
- Acronym: MET
- Website: www.met.edu

Mumbai Educational Trust also known as MET League of Colleges is an academic institution located in Bandra, Mumbai and Nashik. It offers degrees in areas including management, information technology, mass media, pharmacy, medical sciences and insurance training research & development.

== Campus ==
=== Mumbai Campus ===
- MET Institute of Management
- MET Institute of Mass Media
- MET Asian Management Development Centre
- MET Centre for Insurance Training, Research & Development
- MET Institute of Pharmacy
- MET Institute of Medical Sciences
- MET Institute of Information Technology
- MET Institute of Software Development and Research
- MET Institute of Computer Science
- MET Institute of International Studies
- MET Rishikul Vidyalaya

=== Nashik Campus ===
- Institute of Management, Adgaon
- Institute of Pharmacy, Adgaon
- Institute of Engineering, Adgaon
- Institute of Technology (Polytechnic), Adgaon
- Institute of Technology (Polytechnic) BTech, Adgaon
- Institute of Information Technology, Adgaon
- Institute of D. Pharmacy, Adgaon
- School of Architecture and Interior Designing, Gowardhan

=== Famous Alumni ===
- John Abraham, Actor
