= Department of Management Studies IIT Delhi =

Business School in Delhi, India

Department of Management Studies, IIT Delhi (DMS, IIT Delhi)
- Type: Public Business School
- Established: 1997
- Parent institution: IIT Delhi
- Head of Department: Dr. Surya Prakash Singh
- Academic staff: 39
- Students: 371
- Postgraduates: 194
- Doctoral students: 177
- Location: New Delhi, India; 28°32′33″N 77°10′59″E
- Campus: Urban
- Website: dms.iitd.ac.in

The Department of Management Studies, IIT Delhi, also known as DMS IIT Delhi, is a school of management education and research in Indian Institute of Technology, Delhi. The department was established in 1993 by an amendment in IIT Delhi laws. It currently runs three MBA programs:

- A two-year full-time MBA programme with focus on Management Systems.
- A two-year full-time MBA programme with focus on Telecommunication Systems Management under the aegis of Bharti School of Telecom Technology and Management.
- A three-year on-campus evening MBA programme with focus on Technology Management.

== History ==
The Department of Management Studies is a result of the process of growth idea floated in 1963. In 1974, IIT Delhi set up an internal committee to scrutinize the functioning of the management area in the institute. In 1975, an expert committee was set up to formally examine the possibility of launching this area in a more sustained fashion. The result was an M.Tech programme in "Management Systems" in the School for System Studies (subsequently renamed School for Systems and Management Studies).

1978 saw the setting up of the Management Core Group and the core inputs to a full-time Management Education at IIT(D) were reconfirmed by an Advisory Committee constituted by the representatives of the Academia and the industry. Dr Vinayshil Gautam served as the first head of the department. The School for Systems and Management Studies became the Centre for Systems and Management Studies (subsequently renamed as the Centre for Management Studies).

In 1993, the department was brought into existence by amendment to IIT(D) statutes. In response to the feedback from the students, alumni and industry, the Department of Management Studies launched MBA programmes in 1997. Apart from the specialised compulsory courses in the focus area, the students have choice for functional area specialization in finance, marketing, operations, information technology, HR etc.

The institute constantly endeavors to extend industry association and interaction to ensure further enrichment of academic content for the overall benefit of the industry, in particular and the society in general. The institute also provide consulting support to all category of industries in the areas covering all functional areas of management and is also engaged in research activities in various frontier areas of management. Currently, DMSIITD has over forty registered Ph.D. scholars doing research work on various management issues.

== Rankings ==
Institute rankings

Business/Management – India
- NIRF (2024): 4

The Department of Management Studies, IIT Delhi was ranked fourth among management schools in India by the National Institutional Ranking Framework (NIRF) in 2024.
