= Jagdish Sheth School of Management =

Business school in Bangalore, India

- Type: Private business school
- Established: 1995; 31 years ago
- Affiliations: All India Council for Technical Education
- Postgraduates: 240
- Location: Bangalore, Karnataka, India; 12°50′58″N 77°39′46″E
- Campus: 2 acres (0.81 ha)
- Colors: Amber; Grey
- Website: jagsom.edu.in

Jagdish Sheth School of Management (formerly 'IFIM Business School') is a business school in Bangalore, India. It was founded in 1995 and is located in Bangalore, popularly known as the Silicon Valley of India. The institute is located in Electronic City, one of India's largest industrial parks.

Jagdish Sheth School of Management is promoted by the Dalal Street Investment Journal Group and is an AICTE approved institution with an ISO 9001:2008 certification. JAGSOM is accredited by Association to Advance Collegiate Schools of Business (AACSB). JAGSOM was the 6th B Schools in India to earn the AACSB accreditation. JAGSOM is also SAQS (South Asian Quality Assurance System) accredited, an accreditation conferred by The Association of Management Development Institutions in South Asia (AMDISA).

The most recent work of the Jagdish Sheth School of Management was a study that it conducted in partnership with the National HRD Network (NHRDN), to discover the needs of Industry 4.0 and curate a curriculum aligned to that. The study report that was unveiled on January 8, 2019 in Bangalore at the hands of Dr Tom R. Robinson, President and CEO – AACSB, Dr Jagdish Sheth, Professor – Goizueta Business School, Emory University and Dr A. Parasuraman, Professor and Chair in Marketing – University of Miami Business School has drawn widespread appreciation from both industry and academia. It is on account of this study that AACSB has invited Jagdish Sheth School of Management to present at the ICAM 2019, making it a one-of-its-kind representation by any Indian management institute in the history of ICAM.

Sheth School of Management's Marketing & Finance master's programs have been ranked globally top 51+ and 101+ respectively, by QS World University Rankings.

== History ==
The Jagdish Sheth School of Management (formerly 'IFIM Business School')was established in 1995 by the Center for Developmental Education (CDE), a not for profit society registered under the Karnataka Society Registration Act. This institute was established to develop finance and management professionals for the financial services industry of India which was growing at a rapid pace post liberalization in the country. The institute's diploma offering was recognized by AICTE from the day of its inception. The institute grew to be a fully fledged Business School by 2004 and was renamed as the IFIM Business School.

== Accreditation ==
=== Approved ===
JAGSOM is an AICTE approved institute which is also ISO 9001:2008 certified. JAGSOM's programs have also been approved by the Distance Education Bureau, a department of the University Grants Commission (UGC) to offer its programs in distance mode. The PGDM Finance is recognised by the CFA Institute under its University Recognition Program.

JAGSOM is accredited by SAQS (South Asian Quality Assurance System) accreditation, a certification conferred by The Association of Management Development Institutions in South Asia (AMDISA). JAGSOM is accredited by Association to Advance Collegiate Schools of Business (AACSB). Three of the business schools with AACSB accreditation from India, namely JAGSOM Bangalore, IIM Udaipur and ISB are in existence for less than twenty-five years

=== International Collaborations ===
JAGSOM maintains collaborations with ESC Rennes School of Business, University of Applied Sciences, Lübeck, Virginia Commonwealth University, Manchester Metropolitan University, University of Milano-Bicocca, Nanyang Technological University, University of Wollongong and Plymouth University. JAGSOM to offer super-specializations in the new age areas where technology is disrupting the business world. To achieve the same JAGSOM Shall collaborate with McCombs School of Business at the University of Texas at Austin for Big Data Analytics and Blockchain, Darden School of Business at the University of Virginia for MarTech, Virginia Commonwealth University (VCU) School of Business for Financial Analysis and Technology and ESCP London for Digital Transformation and Robotic Process Automation.

== Campus ==
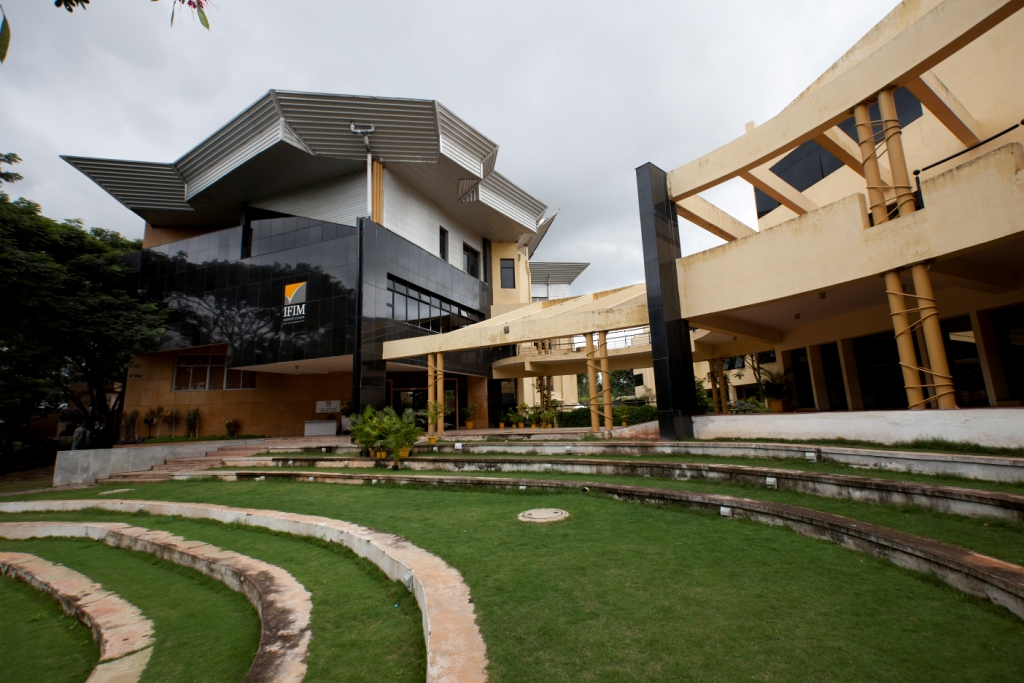
JAGSOM Campus in Bangalore

JAGSOM's institutional campus has over 110,000 square feet of constructed space spread over 1.5 acres of land in Electronic City in Bangalore. JAGSOM's residential campus has co-ed student residences spread across a 2.20-acre campus which is located about 2 km from the institutional campus behind Electronics City. The campus has air-conditioned auditorium and Knowledge Centers consisting of modern Library and Computer Centers.

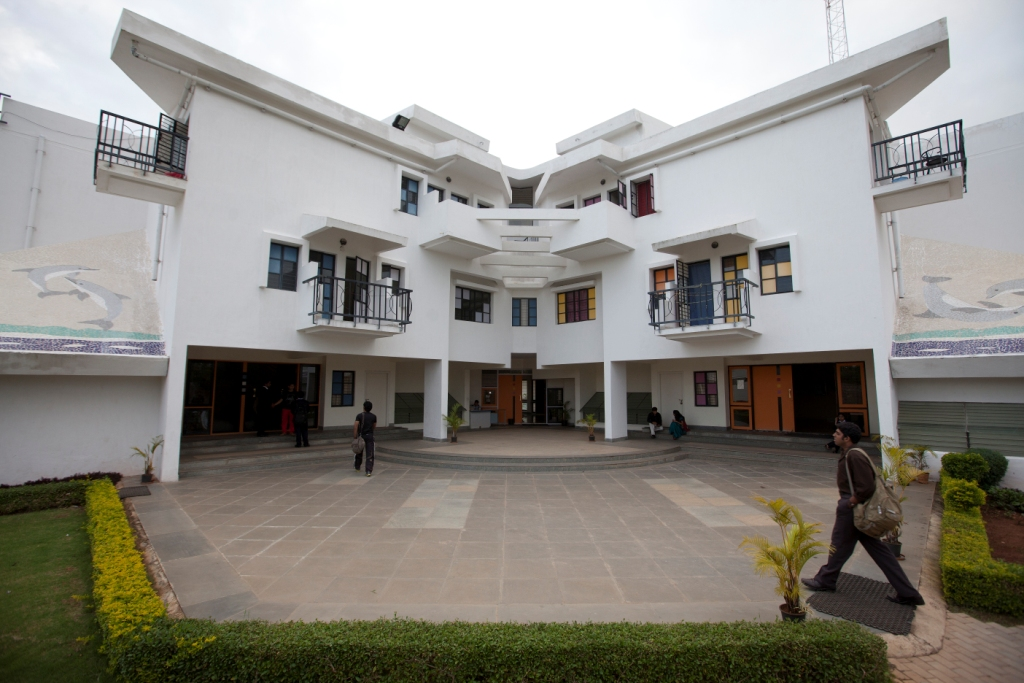
JAGSOM Residential Building

=== Library ===
The 3,000 ft² library on campus holds 11080 relevant books, 381 bound volumes, 400 A/V resources, 118 journals (Print), 5000+ E-journals, 18000+ E-dissertation, 4500 E-annual reports, and 11 newspapers. The library subscribes to over 80 journals or periodicals, and has an extensive collection of reports and projects. Faculty and students can access the online journals – current as well as retrospective – through the electronic database.

=== Use of Technology ===
JAGSOM has been recognised for implementing technology in streamlining the institution's processes. It has also been awarded to use technology's efficiency in enhancing educational and extracurricular activities. JAGSOM has deployed multiple applications to cater for various activities across the campus. The institution has received a recognition in Microsoft's case study on technological implementation.
