= Education in Hyderabad =

Education in Hyderabad, India

Hyderabad is an important seat of learning in southern India. The city hosts three central universities, three deemed universities, and six state universities. Osmania University is one of the oldest universities in India. Many institutes for education like University of Hyderabad, Jawaharlal Nehru Technological University, Hyderabad, International Institute of Information Technology, Indian Institute of Technology, Hyderabad, ICFAI Foundation for Higher Education, Tata Institute of Fundamental Research, Hyderabad, Birla Institute of Technology and Science, Pilani – Hyderabad, Sri Sarada Institute of Science and Technology and medical colleges like Nizam's Institute of Medical Sciences are located there. Also based in the city are the Institute of Public Enterprise and the National Academy of Legal Studies & Research (NALSAR). Hyderabad has various research institutes such as the Indian Institute of Chemical Technology, Centre for Cellular and Molecular Biology. It is also the home of Maulana Azad National Urdu University as well as Dr. B.R. Ambedkar Open University.

Among management schools, Hyderabad hosts two out of India's fourteen AACSB-accredited business schools -- Indian School of Business and ICFAI Business School Hyderabad. This educational infrastructure brings students from all over India and some international students (especially from Africa and the Middle East). Nmims, a widely-known business school in India is also expanding its roots in Hyderabad.

Hyderabad has many institutions that ranked high on the Government of India's National Institutional Ranking Framework started in 2016. However, in the 2020 NIRF rankings released on June 11, 2020, most of them slipped in the rankings, with the exception of IIT, Hyderabad (in Overall category) and ICFAI Foundation for Higher Education and IMT, Hyderabad (in Management category). NALSAR managed to hold on to its third position in Law in the 2020 NIRF rankings.

== Osmania University ==
Osmania University is a public state university located in Hyderabad, India, founded in 1918 with the help of chief Architect of Mahbub Ali Khan - Nawab Sarwar Jung. It was established and named after the seventh and last Nizam of Hyderabad, Nawab Mir Osman Ali Khan. It is the third oldest university in southern India, and the first to be established in the erstwhile princely State of Hyderabad. It is the first Indian university to have Urdu as a medium of instruction. University campus is urban, 1600 acres.

== Jawaharlal Nehru Technological University, Hyderabad ==
Jawaharlal Nehru Technological University, Hyderabad (JNTU Hyderabad) is a public university, located in Hyderabad, Telangana, India, and one of India's leading educational university focusing on engineering. Founded in 1965 as the Nagarjuna Sagar Engineering College, it was established as a university in 1972 by The Jawaharlal Nehru Technological University Act, 1972, also combining colleges in Kakinada and Anantapur. In 2008 the Jawaharlal Nehru Technological Universities Act, 2008 split the university back into four universities, Jawaharlal Nehru Architecture and Fine Arts University, Jawaharlal Nehru Technological University, Anantapur, Jawaharlal Nehru Technological University, Hyderabad and Jawaharlal Nehru Technological University, Kakinada.

== Jawaharlal Nehru Architecture and Fine Arts University (JNAFAU) ==
The "Jawaharlal Nehru Architecture and Fine Arts University" ("JNAFAU"), is an architecture and fine arts university located at Masab Tank, Hyderabad, Telangana, India.[1] JNAFAU has two schools which offer several undergraduates, postgraduate and PhD research programs, with an emphasis of two different colleges: School Of Planning & Architecture, and Fine Arts. It was established by the erstwhile Hyderabad State in 1940, as the "College of Fine Arts".

It offers courses such as Architecture, Facilities and Services Planning, Interior Designing, Planning, etc. in the School of planning and architecture.

In Fine arts building, painting, Applied Arts, Photography, Animation, Sculpture, etc., are offered.

== University of Hyderabad (UoH) ==
The University of Hyderabad (UoH, but also known as HCU, for Hyderabad Central University) is a Central University located in the city of Hyderabad. Established by the act of parliament of India in 1974, this public and largely residential university occupies about 2000 acres in the locality of Gachibowli on the outskirts of the city

== International Institute of Information Technology (IIIT), Hyderabad ==
International Institute of Information Technology (IIIT) Hyderabad is a premier university setup in 1998 on NPP model. Dataquest ranked IIIT-H 3rd among tech-schools in India in a recent survey. The IIIT campus is located in Gachibowli, near Hi-Tec City.

== Birla Institute of Technology and Science (BITS) Pilani, Hyderabad Campus ==
BITS Pilani-Hyderabad campus, one of the premier technical institute for higher education in India is located at Jawaharnagar near Shameerpet on the outskirts of the city on 220-acre (0.89 km^{2}) lush green area. The campus started functioning in 2008 and has around 2500 students including undergraduates, postgraduates and PhD scholars. Admission is done purely on merit basis through online BITSAT exam conducted every year across the country. BITS Pilani University is ranked at No.6 by the India Today Rankings in the year 2014.

== Indian Institute of Technology (IIT) Hyderabad ==
The Indian Institute of Technology Hyderabad (IIT Hyderabad, IITH) is a public engineering and research institution located in Sangareddy district, Telangana, India. IIT Hyderabad is one of the eight new Indian Institutes of Technology (IITs) established by the Ministry of Human Resource Development, Government of India under the Institutes of Technology (Amendment) Act, 2011.

== Indian School of Business (ISB) ==
Indian School of Business (ISB) was set up in 1999 with the help of the Government and a group of Fortune 500 entrepreneurs. It is an international management school providing postgraduate programmes in management in collaboration with London Business School, Wharton Business School and Kellogg School of Management.

== NALSAR University of Law (NALSAR) ==
NALSAR University of Law, or officially the National Academy of Legal Studies and Research (NALSAR), is a premier legal studies institution located in Shamirpet, Medchal District Hyderabad, Telangana, India

== English and Foreign Languages University (EFLU) ==
English and Foreign Languages University (EFLU) is a central university which has been providing research opportunities since its inception in 1958 as Central Institute of English. Starting off as an institute set for improvising the standards of language teaching in India.

== Government Polytechnic college ==
The polytechnic was started in 1923 as Osmania Central Technical College and was located at Mint compound in Saifabad. In 1931, the college was renamed as Osmania Technical College. In 1940s, the college was shifted to its new location at Masab Tank. In 1954, the college once again changed its name to Government Polytechnic. The existing college building at Mint Compound was handed over to Andhra Pradesh Electricity Board.

== Tata Institute of Social Sciences ==
TISS is an institute of social sciences, offers B.A, M.A, Integrated M.Phil-Ph.D, and Direct PhD in various courses under humanities. It is temporarily located at NIRD, Rajendra Nagar Mandal. TISS Hyderabad came into being with the approval of the Academic Council and Governing Board of TISS. The Registrations under Societies Registrations Act and Public Trust Act of the TISS Mumbai are valid for TISS Hyderabad as well. TISS Mumbai provides oversight to matters of admission, instruction, evaluation of TISS Hyderabad and confers TISS degrees. Currently, it operates from two campuses: one in AMR-APARD in Rajendranagar, and the other in Roda Mistry School of Social Work in Gachibowli.

== Institute of Chartered Financial Analysts of India (ICFAI) ==
Institute rankings

Business/Management – India
- NIRF (2023): 40

Institute of Chartered Financial Analysts of India (ICFAI) is a not-for-profit educational society founded by N.J. Yasaswy, Besant C. Raj and Dr. Prasanna Chandra in the year 1984. ICFAI Foundation for Higher Education campus is located in Dontanapalli, Shankarpally Road, Hyderabad. ICFAI Foundation for Higher Education was ranked 40th by the National Institutional Ranking Framework (NIRF) management ranking in 2023.

== NIPER Hyderabad ==
NIPER is an institute declared as an institute of national importance by govt of India is located at old IDPL R&D campus in area of about 150 acres (0.61 km^{2}). The institute offers education and research facilities in area of three pharmaceutical disciplines medicinal chemistry. pharmaceutical analysis and pharmacology and toxicology. The institute caters to the need of pharmaceutical R&D laboratories and industry around the country. The selection will be done by a highly competitive exam like GATE and NIPER JOINT ENTRANCE examination.

== NIFT Hyderabad ==
NIFT Hyderabad is a premier fashion institute located at Madhapur.

== National Academy of Construction ==
NAC is a premier institute for construction-related courses.

== Nizam's Institute of Medical Sciences ==
The Nizam's Institute of Medical Sciences is an Institute under State Legislature Act, recognized by University Grants Commission and Medical Council of India. It is administered under the supervision of Governing Council, Executive Board, Director and other statutory bodies.

== Dhruva College of Management ==
Dhruva College of Management (Dhruva Hyderabad) is a private autonomous Business School. Its campus is situated in the suburbs of Hyderabad in the midst of the 800-acre reserve oxygen forest, which includes hostel facilities for both men and women. Apart from the regular curriculum-based teaching, Dhruva's PGDM programmes are designed to help cater students to an interactive learning experience for which the institute conducts guest lectures that are often delivered by academic professionals, motivational speakers, famous personalities, industry heads and small and big-time entrepreneurs. Dhruva strongly believes in the motto "To make ordinary people do extraordinary things". The institute is ranked among the best B-Schools in Telangana state and is also ranked among the top 125 business schools in India by various ranking sources.

== Secondary schools ==
Among the notable secondary schools in Hyderabad are Meru International School Miyapur, Meru International School Tellapur, All Saints High School Walden's Path, The Hyderabad Public School, Begumpet, The Hyderabad Public School, Ramanthapur, Nasr School, International School Of Hyderabad, Oakridge International School, Open Minds - A Birla School, Modern High School, St. George's Grammar School, Indus World School, Lakshanika International School, Meridian School, Chirec International School and Silver Oaks – The School of Hyderabad and P obul reddy public school

== Other institutions ==
- Engineering colleges:
  - Chaitanya Bharathi Institute of Technology
  - Ellenki College of Engineering and Technology
  - Vasavi College of Engineering
  - Government Polytechnic, Hyderabad
  - Jamia Nizamia
  - Maturi Venkata Subba Rao Engineering College
  - Muffakham Jah College of Engineering and Technology
  - Sreenidhi Institute of Science and Technology
  - TKR College of Engineering and Technology
  - VNR Vignana Jyothi Institute of Engineering and Technology
- Design & Media colleges:
- ICAT Design & Media College, Hyderabad
- Miscellaneous
  - Jamiat Ul Mominat, an Islamic female seminary

== See also ==
- Centre for Economic and Social Studies
- List of business schools in Hyderabad, India
- List of institutions based in Hyderabad India
