= ICFAI University =

ICFAI University may refer to one of several Institute of Chartered Financial Analysts of India universities in India:

- ICFAI Foundation for Higher Education, formerly ICFAI University, in Hyderabad, Telangana
- ICFAI University, Dehradun, in Uttarakhand
- ICFAI University, Himachal Pradesh
- ICFAI University, Jaipur, in Rajasthan
- ICFAI University, Jharkhand
- ICFAI University, Meghalaya
- ICFAI University, Mizoram
- ICFAI University, Nagaland
- ICFAI University, Sikkim
- ICFAI University, Tripura
