= Debapratim Purkayastha =

Indian academic (1976–2021)

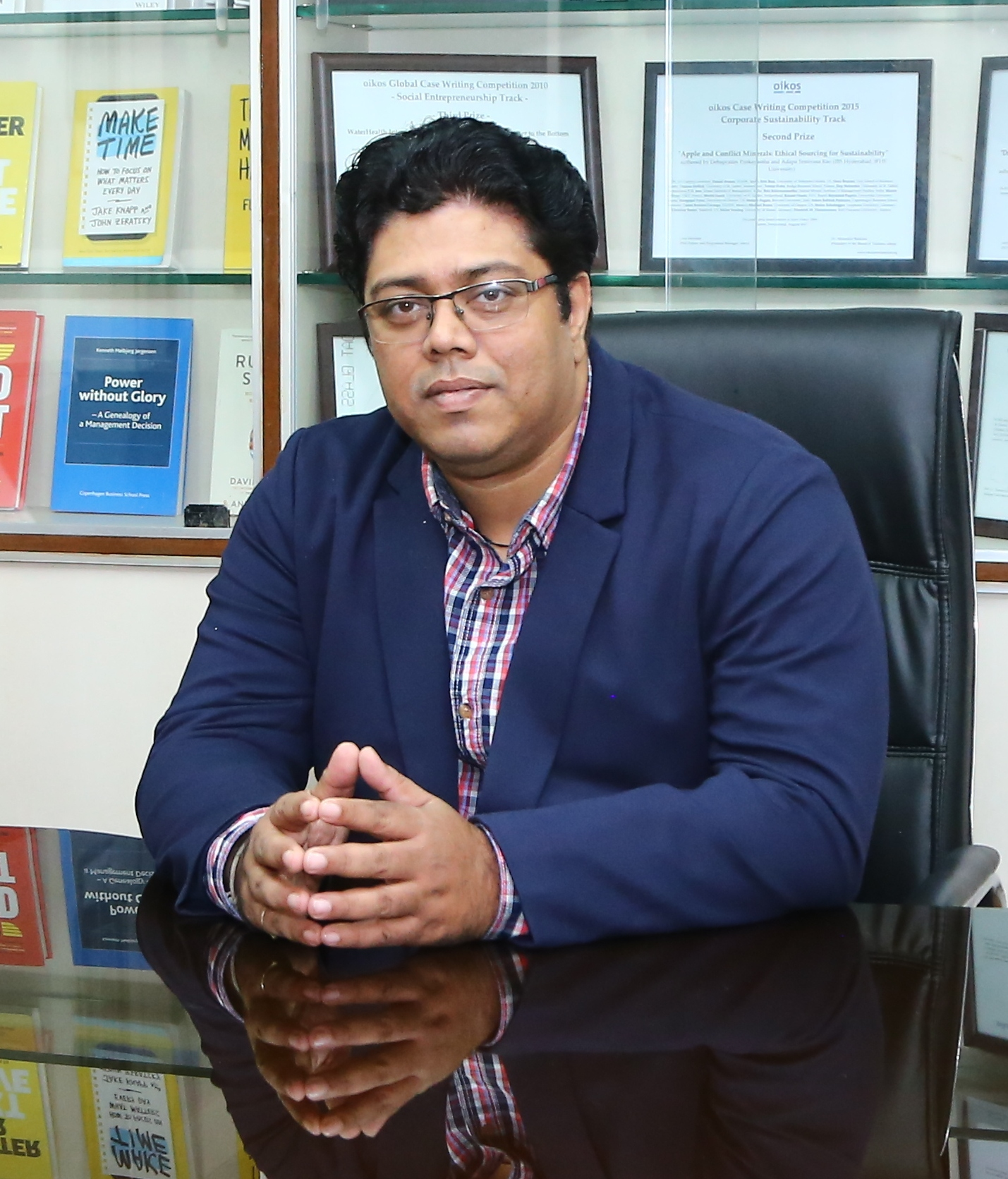
- Born: 1976; Assam, India
- Died: May 7, 2021 (aged 44)
- Education: B.Sc. (Honors); MBA; PhD
- Alma mater: Cotton College, Gauhati University; Utkal University; Kalinga Institute of Industrial Technology
- Occupations: Professor; academic leader; author

Debapratim Purkayastha (Bengali: দেবপ্রতিম পুরকায়স্থ; born 1976) was a professor of strategy, academic leader and case method expert.

== Early life and education ==
Purkayastha was born in Hailakandi, Assam, to Dilip Kumar Purkayastha, a bureaucrat and former Regional Passport Officer, and Anima Purkayastha. He spent most of his childhood and did his early education in Guwahati, completing his BSc from Cotton College, Gauhati University. Purkayastha completed his MBA from Utkal University, and PhD from Kalinga Institute of Industrial Technology, Bhubaneswar.

== Career and roles ==
Purkayastha joined ICFAI in 2006 after a stint in the pharmaceutical industry. Before that, he had worked in sales, sales force management and product management, at companies such as Torrent Pharmaceuticals, Zydus Cadila, Themis Medicare, and Hetero Drugs.

In addition to teaching Strategy at ICFAI Business School Hyderabad (ICFAI Foundation for Higher Education, Hyderabad), Purkayastha headed the IBS Case Research Center first as an Associate Dean, Dean and then as Director. His main areas of scholarship include corporate social responsibility as strategy; inclusive business models; and social entrepreneurship.

Purkayastha was also the consulting editor of Case Folio – The IUP Journal of Management Case Studies, a member of the Editorial Board for Case Research Journal, published by North American Case Research Association; and an Editorial Advisory Board member of ‘The CASE Journal’, the official journal of The CASE Association (published by the Emerald Group) and ‘Case Focus’, published by The Case Centre.

== Awards and recognition ==
Purkayastha was conferred the 'Outstanding Contribution to the Case Method' award in 2015, from The Case Centre's executive committee. He was the youngest, and the first educator from India to receive this award. He was also the first educator from outside North America and Europe to feature on the list of The Case Centre's all-time top authors list (covering 40 years, i.e., from 1974 to 2014) released in 2014.

Purkayastha was The Case Centre's bestselling author every year since 2016, when the list was first made public. He was recognized for developing case studies in different innovative topics and formats including graphic novel (comic book) format. For instance, in 2019, his case 'Turbulence on the Tarmac', illustrated by Sid Ghosh, won the 'Outstanding Compact Case' award from The Case Centre.

Purkayastha's other awards are from the Academy of Management, Association of MBAs, EFMD, CEEMAN, Emerald Group, North American Case Research Association, oikos International, The Case Centre, John Molson School of Business (Concordia University), China Europe International Business School, AESE Business School, Syracuse University, etc.

In March 2018, Purkayastha received the Career360's “Faculty Research Awards”, which recognized India's top educators. The award was presented by Prakash Javadekar, the then Minister of Human Resource Development, Government of India.

In 2021, Purkayastha won his eleventh Case Centre Awards, placing him just two awards behind the record thirteen awards won by Sumantra Ghosal.

== Death ==
On 7 May 2021, Purkayastha died due to COVID-19.
