= Darul Ifta =

Darul Ifta may refer to:

- Bangsamoro Darul Ifta', an Islamic advisory council in Bangsamoro, Philippines
- Darul Iftaa Advisory Council, of Jamia Faridia, in Islamabad, Pakistan
- Dar al-Ifta al-Misriyyah, an Egyptian Islamic advisory, justiciary and governmental body
- Markazi Darul Ifta, a Fatwa department of Dargah Aala Hazrat
- Darul Ifta Jamia Nizamia, department of Fatwa of Jamia Nizamia
- Darul Ifta at Darul Uloom Deoband, in Uttar Pradesh, India
- Darul Ifta Leicester, led by Muhammad ibn Adam al-Kawthari, in Leicester, UK

== See also ==
- Darulfatwa - Islamic High Council of Australia
- Mufti
- Fatwa
- Jamiat Ul Mominat, an Islamic female seminary in Hyderabad, India
