= List of business schools in Hyderabad, India =

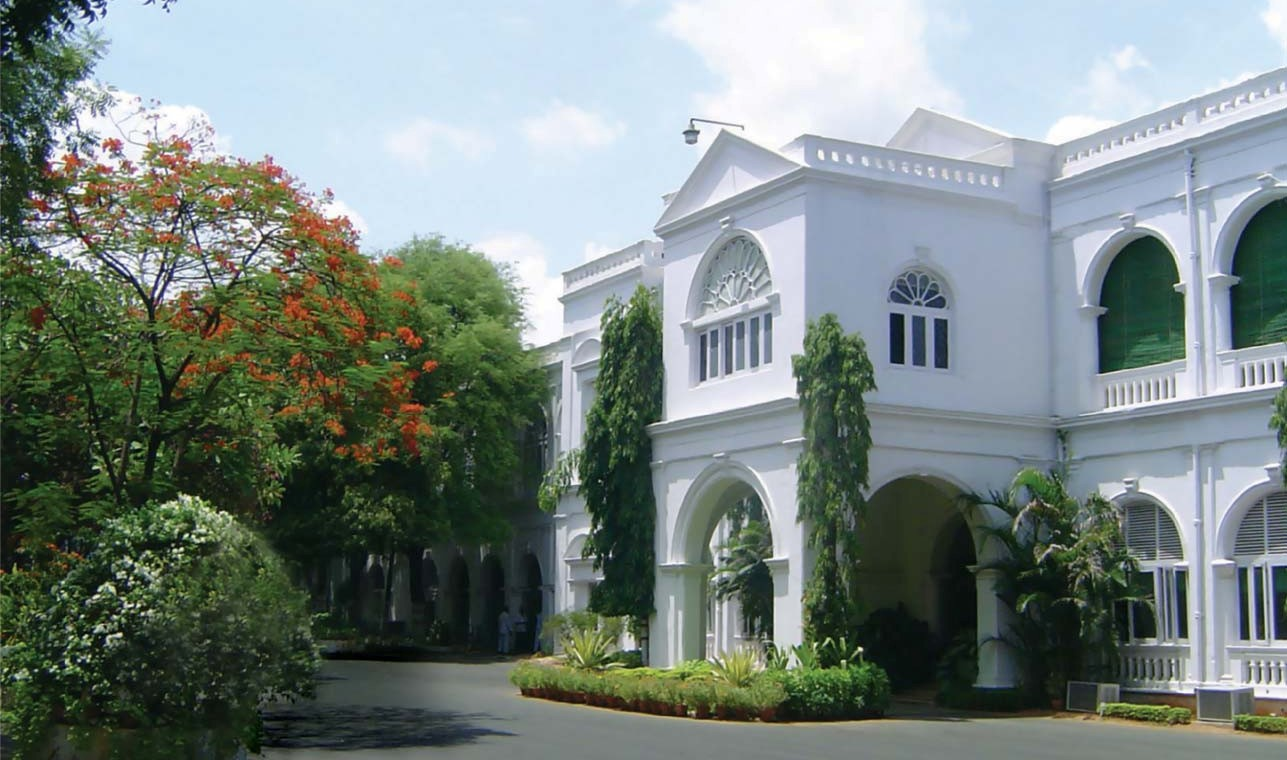
The Administrative Staff College of India main building, formerly known as Bella Vista

This is a list of notable business schools in Hyderabad, India. Hyderabad is the capital and largest city of the Indian state of Telangana and de jure capital of Andhra Pradesh. (Note: According to the Andhra Pradesh Reorganisation Act, 2014 part 2 Section 5:(1) On and from the appointed day, Hyderabad in the existing State of Andhra Pradesh, shall be the common capital of the State of Telangana and the State of Andhra Pradesh for such period not exceeding ten years. (2) After expiry of the period referred to in sub-section (1), Hyderabad shall be the capital of the State of Telangana and there shall be a new capital for the State of Andhra Pradesh. The common capital is defined as the existing area notified as the Greater Hyderabad Municipal Corporation under the Hyderabad Municipal Corporation Act, 1955. Though Andhra Pradesh uses facilities in Hyderabad during the transition period, Telangana state is responsible for day-to-day administration of the city. City MLAs are members of the Legislature of Telangana (§ 3 and 18(1) of the Act).) A business school is a university-level institution that confers degrees in business administration or management.

== Business schools in Hyderabad, India ==
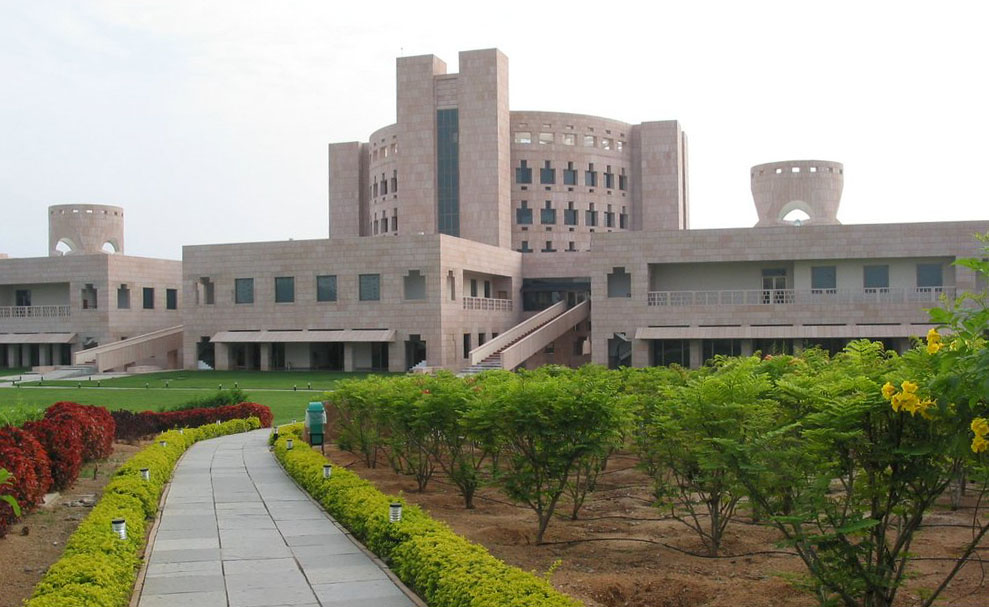
A view of the Indian School of Business campus in Hyderabad

- Administrative Staff College of India – A public school started jointly by the Government of India and the representatives of industry as an autonomous institute in the year 1956 to impart training in the field of management development
- College of Defence Management – Sponsored by India's Ministry of Defence, the school provides scientific and management education to Indian Armed Forces officers.
- Engineering Staff College of India - The Engineering Staff College of India (ESCI), established in 1982, is an autonomous organ of the Institution of Engineers. The School of Post Graduate Studies (SPGS), a part of Engineering Staff College of India (ESCI), was established in 2008. It is an autonomous institute approved by the All India Council for Technical Education (AICTE) & Ministry of HRD, Government of India, for awarding a two-year postgraduate diploma in Management (PGDM), PGDM (General Management).
- ICFAI Business School Hyderabad - Established in 1995, and accredited by the Association to Advance Collegiate Schools of Business (AACSB), a non-profit membership organization that provides a quality certification to its member schools and their programs. It is promoted by the ICFAI Group. It ranked 25th in NIRF 2020.
- Indian School of Business – Accredited by the Association to Advance Collegiate Schools of Business (AACSB), a non-profit membership organization that provides a quality certification to its member schools and their programs, the school offers certificates in various post-graduate management programs.
- Siva Sivani Institute of Management, Hyderabad, Telangana, is the first b-school established in the twin Telugu states, approved by AICTE, GOI, in 1992. It offers three two-year full time PGDM programmes: PGDM, PGDM-BIF, Pand GDM-BA. It also offers doctoral level fellowship programmes.
- Vignana Jyothi Institute of Management, Hyderabad - offers two-year full-time postgraduate diplomas in management (PGDM). It is an autonomous institution approved by AICTE and accredited by SAQS and MBA. Established in 1993 in Hyderabad by the Vignana Jyothi Society, it is one of the old and top B-schools in Hyderabad, Telangana and Andhra Pradesh.
- Institute of Management Technology, Hyderabad – offers two-year full-time residential postgraduate diplomas in management (PGDM) and 15-month weekend only executive PGDM. It also offers doctoral level fellowship programmes.
- Institute of Public Enterprise – Established in 1964, for the study of issues and policies relating to public enterprises, management education started in 1980 with the start of a three-year part-time MBA (PE) programme.
- National Institute of Agricultural Extension Management – An autonomous extension and agribusiness management institute with a focus upon agricultural economics and the provision of support and services to farmers and fishermen for practicing sustainable agriculture.
- Schulich School of Business – The business school of York University located in Toronto, Ontario, Canada, it operates a satellite campus in Hyderabad.
- School of Management Studies, University of Hyderabad (Hyderabad Central University).
- University College of Commerce & Business Management – A constituent college of Osmania University established in 1962, it is divided into the departments of Business Management and Commerce
- Woxsen School of Business – A private business school established in 2013 by Praveen Pula, an education entrepreneur.

== See also ==
- List of educational institutions in Hyderabad (India)
- List of schools in Hyderabad, India
- List of MBA schools in India
- Education in Hyderabad
