= Adosh Kumar =

Indian Army general

Lieutenant General Adosh Kumar PVSM AVSM SM
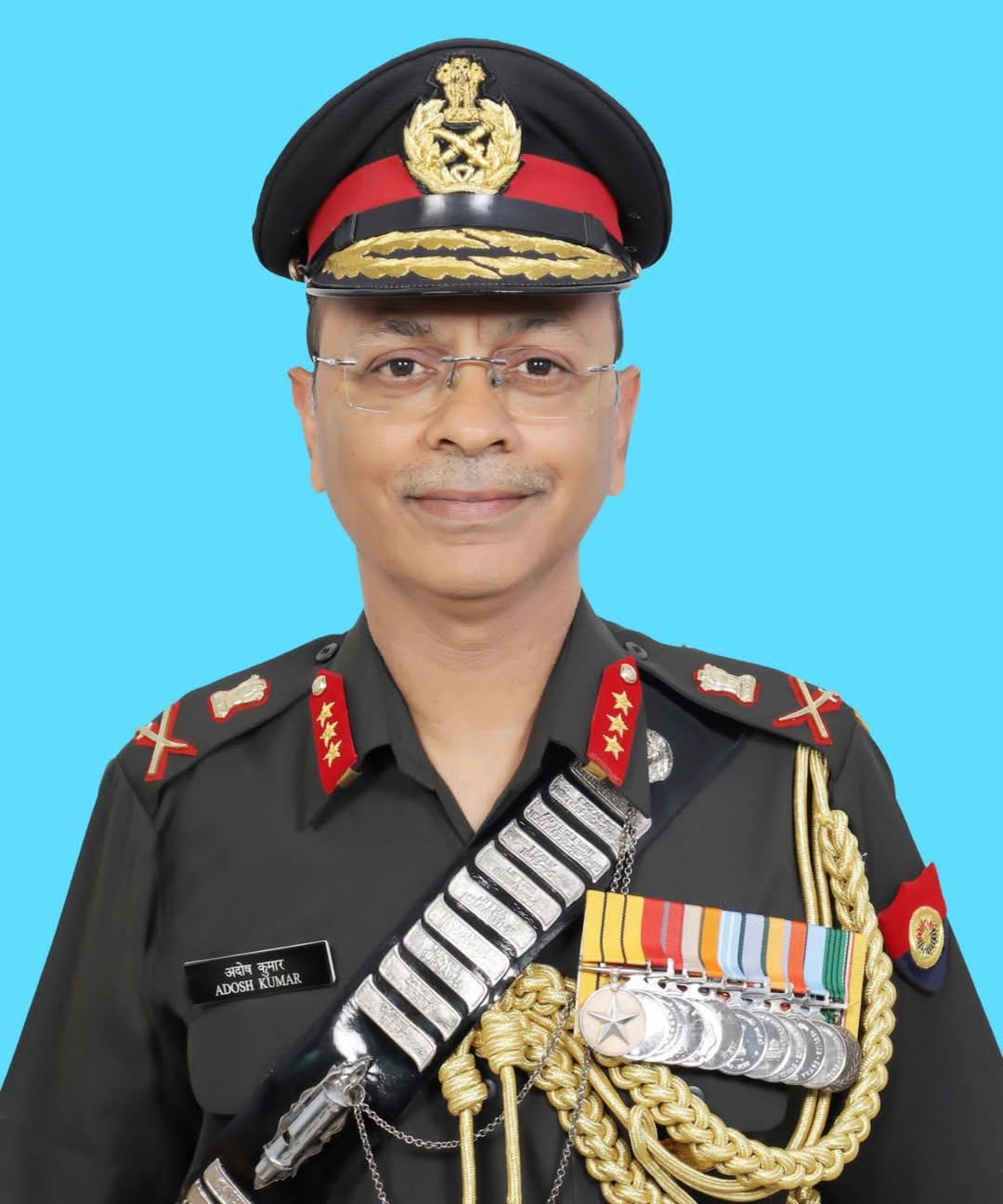
- Lieutenant General Adosh Kumar
- Military career
- Allegiance: India
- Branch: Indian Army
- Service years: 1986 — present
- Rank: Lieutenant General
- Unit: Regiment of Artillery
- Awards: Param Vishisht Seva Medal; Ati Vishisht Seva Medal; Sena Medal

Adosh Kumar was a serving three star general of the Indian Army, who was the Director General of Regiment of Artillery.

== Education ==
Kumar had attended the National Defence Academy. He has done M.Sc. in Defence Studies from Defence Services Staff College, completed MMS from College of Defence Management. He went to the National Defence College and Osmania University as well.

== Military career ==
Kumar was commissioned in the Indian Army in the Regiment of Artillery in 1986.

He has commanded his parent battalion, an Artillery Brigade and a Artillery Division. He has experience of serving in Counter Insurgency area in Northern Command. He also served as an instructor at School of Artillery, National Defence Academy and College of Defence Management.

Prior of his appointment as DG Artillery, he was serving as Director General Land, Works & Environment.

== Awards and decorations ==
Kumar has been awarded the Param Vishisht Seva Medal, Ati Vishisht Seva Medal and the Sena Medal.
