= ICFAI Business School Hyderabad =

Business school in India

- Motto: Meritum Ethicus
- Type: Private Business School
- Established: 1995
- Founder: N.J. Yasaswy
- Parent institution: ICFAI
- Accreditation: AACSB; SAQS; NAAC
- Affiliations: The ICFAI Foundation for Higher Education (Since 2008)
- Director: Venu Gopal Rao K S
- Location: Survey No. 156/157, IFHE-IBS Campus, Donthanapally Shankarapalli Road, Hyderabad, India; 17.42045°N 78.21785°E
- Campus: 91 acres (37 ha); Urban
- Colours: Blue and Red
- Website: ibsindia.org ibshyderabad.org
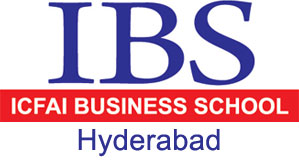

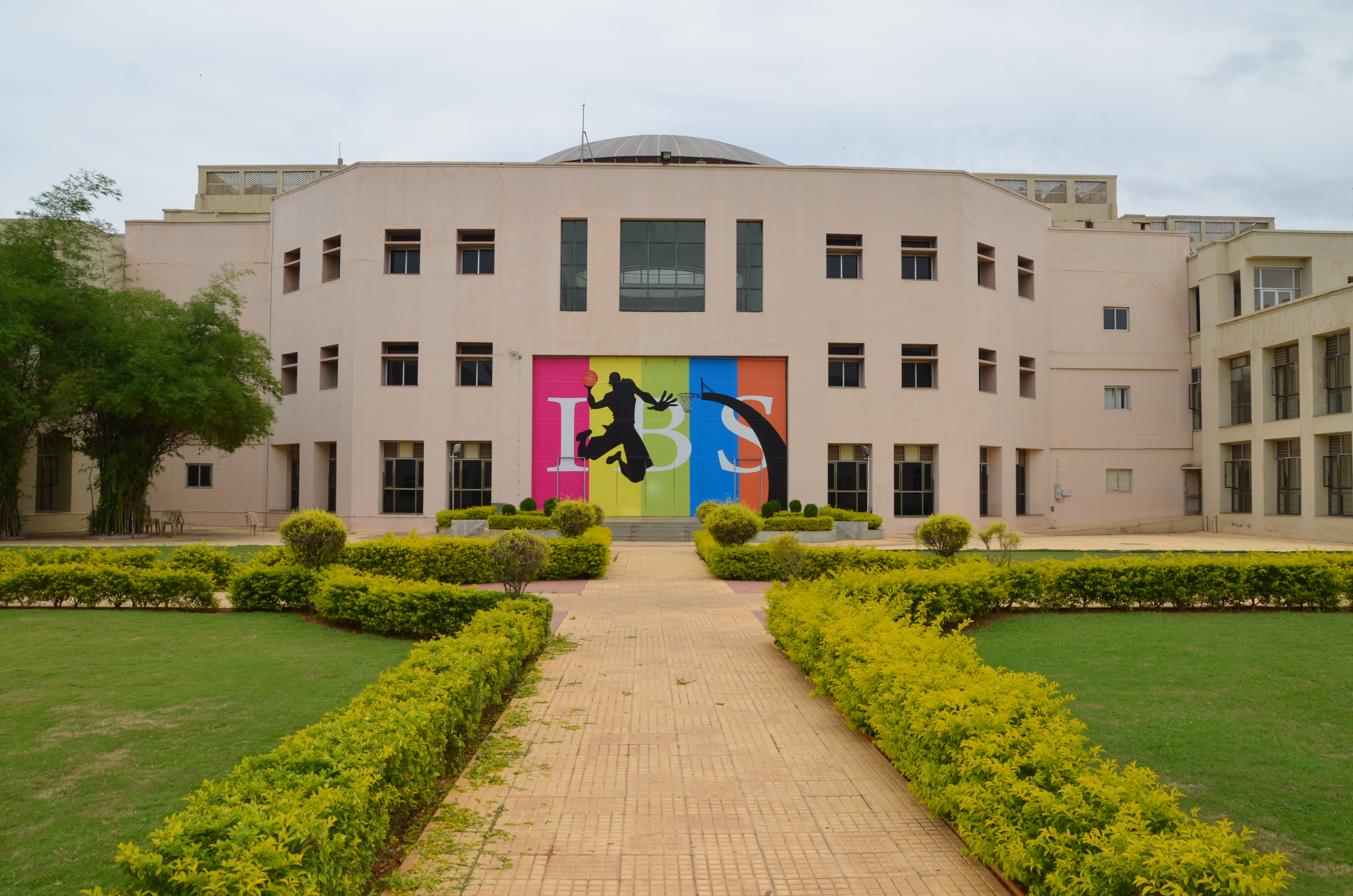
ICFAI Business School

The ICFAI Business School Hyderabad (IBS Hyderabad) is a business school in India. It was founded in 1995 and is located in Dontanapalli, Shankarpally Road, Hyderabad.

IBS Hyderabad is a constituent of the ICFAI Foundation for Higher Education (IFHE), a Deemed-to-be-University as per the UGC Act 1956. IBS Hyderabad is accredited by Association to Advance Collegiate Schools of Business (AACSB) in 2020.

== History ==
IBS Hyderabad was established in 1995. It is promoted by the ICFAI Group. Institute of Chartered Financial Analysts of India (ICFAI) is a not-for-profit educational society founded by N.J. Yasaswy, Besant C. Raj and Dr. Prasanna Chandra in the year 1984. After the establishment of IFHE in 2008, IBS Hyderabad became its first constituent.

== Programs ==
The major programs offered at IBS Hyderabad are MBA, PhD and BBA. As of 2020, it is also the only institution in India that is offering AACSB-accredited programs at the undergraduate, post graduate and doctoral levels. IBS Hyderabad also offers a number of certificate courses in Management. ICFAI Business School (IBS) offered scholarship program worth 10 crores to students.

IBS campuses located at Hyderabad, Bangalore are part of IFHE (Deemed-to-be University under Section 3 of UGC Act, 1956) Dehradun and Jaipur are part of ICFAI Universities (State private university) and offer two year full-time Masters in Business Administration (MBA) programs.

IBS campuses located at Ahmedabad, Gurgaon, Kolkata, Mumbai and Pune offer a two year full-time Postgraduate Program in Management(PGPM). The Program prepares the students and equip them for successful corporate careers. These campuses are independent professional institutions and are neither affiliated to nor are off-campus centers of any University.

Admission Procedure

The candidates seeking admission to MBA/PGPM Program at any of the 9 IBS Campuses have to appear for IBSAT 2023.

IBSAT 2025:

The admissions for the MBA/PGPM and PhD programs are based on IBSAT 2025, Group Discussion & Interview.

- Test Window - 4th week of December, 2025
- Two hour Computer Based Test (CBT)
- Group discussion/Personal Interview during February/ March 2026.

Eligibility:

- Graduation in any discipline with minimum 50% marks and medium of instruction as English.
- All applicants should have completed a minimum of 15 years of regular education( on 10+2+3 or 10+2+4 basis).

== IBS Case Research Center ==
IBS Hyderabad has adopted the case method of pedagogy. The IBS Case Research Center is a center of excellence at the institution. Led by Debapratim Purkayastha, the center has developed more than 6,500 case studies that are used in leading schools across the world. The center has a number of bestselling cases and regularly wins awards in international competitions. In 2020, number of bestselling cases from IBS was next only to that of Harvard Business School. In terms of awards won at The Case Centre since 2011, IBS Hyderabad was next only to Harvard Business School and INSEAD.

== Accreditation and ranking ==
ICFAI Business School (IBS), Hyderabad is accredited by the prestigious Association to Advance Collegiate Schools of Business (AACSB). AACSB accreditation is globally synonymous with the highest standards of achievement for business schools. Less than 5% of business schools worldwide have met the rigorous standards for this significant achievement.

IBS Hyderabad is also SAQS (South Asian Quality Assurance System) accredited, an accreditation conferred by The Association of Management Development Institutions in South Asia (AMDISA), since 2006.

The faculty of Management of IFHE, i.e. IBS Hyderabad, was ranked 40th by the National Institutional Ranking Framework (NIRF) management ranking in 2023. In 2018, it had obtained its highest rank of 22nd in NIRF.

== Top recruiters ==
IBS has a network of 1000+ companies for placements, 1% of the following corporate total employees are IBS alumni.

- ICICI Bank
- Deloitte
- HDFC Bank
- Tata Consultancy Services
- EY
- Kotak Mahindra Bank
- Accenture
- JPMorgan Chase & Co.
- Axis Bank
- HSBC
- Wells Fargo
- BNY Mellon
- Cognizant
