= ICFAI University, Tripura =

Private university in Agartala, Tripura

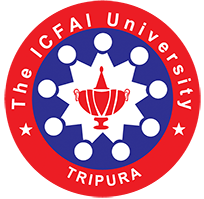
- Motto: Meritum Ethicus
- Type: Private
- Established: 2004; 22 years ago
- Affiliations: UGC; NAAC; ACU; AIU; NCTE; RCI; BCI
- Chancellor: Dr. T. Tirupati Rao
- Vice-Chancellor: Dr. Biplab Halder
- Location: Agartala, Tripura, India; 23.93444°N 91.33854°E
- Campus: 32 acres (13 ha); Rural
- Language: English
- Colors: Blue and Red
- Nicknames: IUT, IUTRIPURA
- Website: www.iutripura.edu.in

The ICFAI University, Tripura (Institute of Chartered Financial Analysts of India University, Tripura) is a private university located in Agartala, Tripura, India. It was established in 2004, the university was founded under the Institute of Chartered Financial Analysts of India University, Tripura Act, 2004 (Tripura Act No. 8 of 2004), enacted by the Government of Tripura. It is part of the ICFAI Group, which operates multiple higher education institutions across India.

== History ==
ICFAI University, Tripura, was established as a state private university. It was set up by an Act of the State Legislature of Tripura passed by the Government of Tripura in 2004. The university is recognized by the University Grants Commission (India).

== Cultural activities ==
The university hosted the 38th AIU Inter-University North East Zone Youth Festival in January 2025, featuring cultural groups from across the North Eastern region of India. The performances included in music, dance, theatre, literature, and fine arts.

== See also ==
- Higher education in India
- List of universities in India
- List of state private universities in India
- ICFAI University
- List of institutions of higher education in Tripura
- Association of Commonwealth Universities
