= CFA Council of India =

- Type: Constituent unit of the ICFAI University
- Professional title: CFA
- Members: 7,000+ (15,000+ Students)
- President: Vice Chancellor, ICFAI University
- Website: www.thefinancialanalyst.org

The CFA Council of India (The CFA Council) was established by The ICFAI University, Tripura as a constituent body for the development and regulation of the CFA Profession on sound ethical lines. All the CFAs from the ICFAI University, Tripura are eligible to become members of the Council. All members are required to abide by the code of ethics of the Council.

The Code of Conduct covers, inter alia, the following aspects:

- Integrity: A CFA shall conduct himself* with integrity and dignity in his dealings with the public, clients, customers, employers, employees, professionals and fellow analysts.
- Ethical Behavior: A CFA shall conduct himself and shall encourage others to practice the financial analysis profession in a professional and ethical manner that will reflect credit on himself and his profession and his organization/employer where or for whom he is working.
- Professional Competence: A CFA shall act with competence and shall strive to maintain and improve his competence and that of others in the profession.
- Objectivity: A CFA shall be fair in his dealings and must not be biased or prejudiced. He shall try to maintain objectivity and impartiality towards one and all.
- Professional Independence: A CFA shall use proper care and exercise independent professional judgement in all his professional activities.
- Public Trust: A CFA shall assume the basic responsibility to place the interest of clients, prospective clients and employers ahead of his own. He shall seek to enhance public confidence in his profession.

The CFA Council will put in place a suitable mechanism to enforce the Code of Ethics and Standards of Professional Conduct.

== Membership ==
The 'Chartered Financial Analyst' designation will be conferred only on completion of MFA (Master in Financial Analysis) or Groups Alpha, Beta, Gamma and Delta of MS Finance post graduate programs offered by the ICFAI University under Flexible Mode. The CFA Program offered by the ICFAI University, Tripura is a unique program covering the areas of financial markets, financial analysis, valuation of assets, portfolio management, mutual and other funds and professional ethics.

The CFA Program has been developed in the context of the present and future needs of the investment industry and the CFA profession.

The core body of knowledge of the CFA Program includes current and evolving concepts, techniques and applications, and also providing the flavor of the frontiers of knowledge.

=== Objectives ===
The CFA Program is a postgraduate program with the following broad objectives :

- To improve the ability to develop a framework for financial analysis and to rationally evaluate alternatives for purposes of decision-making.
- To deepen insights into practical applications of financial analysis in a dynamic investment environment.
- To encourage aspiring financial analysts equip themselves with the latest tools and techniques.
- To develop contemporary body of knowledge and skill-set and make them available for those seeking rewarding careers in the investment industry era of globalization.

=== The Approach ===
The CFA Program follows the following distinctive but inter-related approaches :

- Basic Knowledge aimed at improving students' understanding of certain fundamental phenomena and relationships underlying the changing world of investment management.
- Tools and Techniques are required to equip students improve their analytical ability and power of integration and synthesis in the context of financial markets and instruments.
- Application Areas linking the theoretical studies to the practical problems faced by financial analysts and investment managers.
- Professional Ethics aimed at inculcating in the students an ethical approach in their professional interactions and a sense of personal, corporate, and social responsibilities.

=== Focus Areas ===
The Program has five focus areas:

- Financial Markets

Financial markets include capital markets (equity, debt and derivatives) both primary and secondary segments. The players include the issuers of financial instruments, the institutional and individual investors, the intermediaries (like investment bankers, brokers, bankers, etc.), the financial analysts, the media, the mutual funds, pension funds, hedge funds, the stock exchanges (like Bombay Stock Exchange, National Stock Exchange, etc.), and the regulators like Securities and Exchange Board of India.

- Analysis and Valuation

The various financial instruments like equity, fixed income securities (like bonds), and derivatives (like options, futures, and swaps) have different risks associated with them and yield different returns. These risks and returns have to be carefully analyzed and the instruments have to be properly valued applying various methods of valuation.

- Portfolio Management

Different investors have different risk profiles and return-expectations. Hence different portfolios have to be developed and managed to achieve the objectives of the investors. Depending upon the changing circumstances, the portfolios have to be rebalanced. Asset allocation and risk-return management are the key functions of a successful portfolio manager.

- Mutual and Other Funds

A wide variety of mutual funds, pension funds, and hedge funds have come into existence. Each mutual fund has several schemes: growth schemes, income schemes, balanced schemes, sectoral schemes, index-linked schemes, tax-planning schemes, etc. Several insurance companies have to manage their investment funds as per Insurance Regulatory Development Authority Regulations. Securities and Exchange Board of India has kept in place detailed regulations for mutual funds.

- Code of Conduct

The CFAs are required to adhere to the code of ethics and standards of professional conduct covering various aspects like integrity, ethical behavior, professional competence, objectivity, professional independence and public trust.

== See also ==
- CPA Council of India
