= Aashayein foundation =

Non-governmental organization in India

Aashayein Foundation
- Motto: Nurturing Hopes
- Type: Non governmental organisation
- Established: 19 May 2007
- Location: Bangalore, Hyderabad, India
- Website: http://aashayeinfoundation.org/

Aashayein Foundation is an NGO (non-governmental organisation) in India that works towards the betterment of the underprivileged children through education. The organization was founded in January 2007 but was formally registered on 19 May 2007 by a group of young IT professionals between the ages of 20 and 30 years. The organization achieves its goals by conducting projects and events aligned with its goals.

== Projects ==
=== Bacche Mann Ke Sacche (BMKS) ===
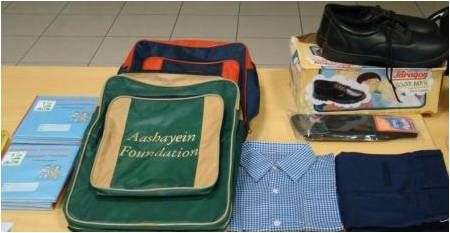
Bacche Mann ke Sacche

The objective of this project is to identify and create educational opportunities for kids who do not get a chance to attend schools. Through this project children from economically weaker section of the society are identified and supported – giving the child an opportunity to realize its full potential. This project is also aimed to create awareness about education among masses and families who cannot afford education.

BMKS is already in its 3rd year of operations in Bangalore. This project has been launched in Hyderabad in the current financial year 2009–10.

The scope of the project is to:

- Identify children who cannot afford education or are unable to attend school due to multiple reasons.
- Admission of students to government or government aided school in the vicinity.
- Targeting the students in age group 6 to 16 from the standard 1 to 10.
- Taking appropriate actions to ensure continuation of student's education (till 10th Standard).

=== Shikshana Abhiyana ===
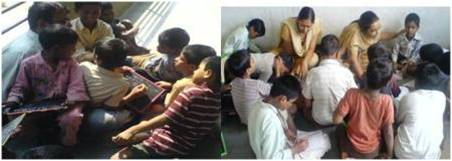
Shikshana Abhiyana

The objective of this project is to provide quality education to the students in various governments and government aided school. The project aims at bridging the knowledge gap between the public and private schools. One can see the members of Aashayein visiting schools to teach the children and motivate them so that they can take up education in their life. Shikshana Abhiyana is also aimed at building the capacity of the school and school authorities by organizing various teacher training programs, workshops, seminars, etc. for the teachers of government and government aided schools.

The scope of the project is to:

- Work towards reducing the gap between the level of education in public and private schools.
- Function in auxiliary capacity to improve quality of teaching in government schools from standards 1 to 10.
- Ensure all-round development of children with focus on scholastic as well as extra-curricular activities.
- Motivate students, teachers and parents to create a better learning atmosphere.

=== Pustaka Abhiyana ===
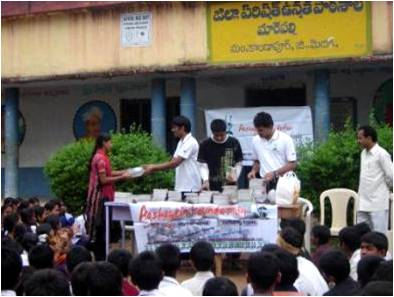
Pustaka Abhiyana

Most of the underprivileged children cannot afford notebooks and other stationery material. As a result, they have little or no exposure to writing or reading or both. The organization believes this to be one of the major reasons for children unable maintain their interest in classes or practice what is learnt at school, causing in drop-outs. Pustaka Abhiyana is about ensuring that each and every child has access to basic writing material for their education. This project is mainly aimed at rural schools.

The scope of the project is to:

- Identify students who do not have access or have shortage of basic writing material.
- Target the students in age group 6 to 16 from standard 1 to 10.
- Provide basic writing material to such students either individually or by doing basic writing material donation drive in government and semi-government schools.
- Make this a continuous process where Aashayein will provide writing material as and when the students have exhausted their supply.

=== Breakfast Serving ===
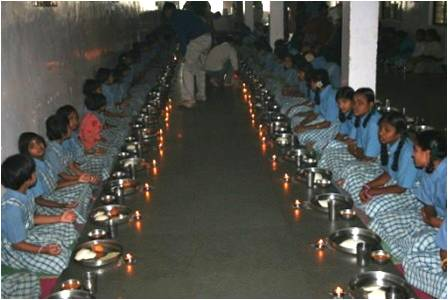
Breakfast Serving

The Breakfast Serving drive was the organization's first step towards serving underprivileged children in orphanages, mentally challenged places (called 'aashrams'), which was extended to old age homes later. This activity gives the foundation an opportunity to interact with kids and senior citizens. Every Sunday morning, Aashayein members visits an 'aashram' and serves breakfast. The purpose is also to identify the requirements, problems and challenges faced by the authorities who run these 'aashrams' and support them monetarily or non-monetarily.

The scope of the project is to:

- Identify orphanages and old age homes which have monetary constraints.
- Serving breakfast to such orphanages or old age home every Sunday morning.
- Maintain a database of orphanages or old age homes for collaboration to meet their other needs either directly or referring the same to a partner NGO.
- To serve as a platform for new members to be introduced to Aashayein's volunteers and programs and for all volunteers to meet and share their ideas and thoughts to help the organization attain its goals.
- To identify the requirements and challenges faced by the authorities who run these 'aashrams'.

== Sponsors and finances ==
In Bangalore, Aashayein Foundation is supported by IT giants like Perot Systems, Robert Bosch, Oracle, HP, HCL, Tech Mahindra, Yahoo, Texas Instruments, Zenith, Honeywell, Wipro, SAP.

In Hyderabad, it is supported by Google, Infosys, Wipro, Deloitte, Bank of America, Convergys, and HCL Technologies.

The foundation also works on contributions from more than 1000 individuals.

== Achievements ==
- 150 Aashrams and schools and over 10000 children covered so far and the number is growing.
- Aashayein Foundation conferred the Certificate of Appreciation during the Young Achiever Award 2008 by Rotary Bangalore Midtown and Brigade group.
- Dharmesh Porwal, one of the organization's trustees, was selected for social entrepreneurship workshop at London School of Business
- Ankur Sharma awarded Chhatrapati Shivaji award for his work towards BMKS.
- Anshi Goel awarded "Women who are Catalysts for Social Change" on Women's Day by Infosys, Hyderabad for her work in Aashayein in March 2009.
- Aashayein Foundation organizes events for the underprivileged students such as summer camps, Republic Day celebrations, Aashayein Walkathon, uniform distributions.

== Events ==
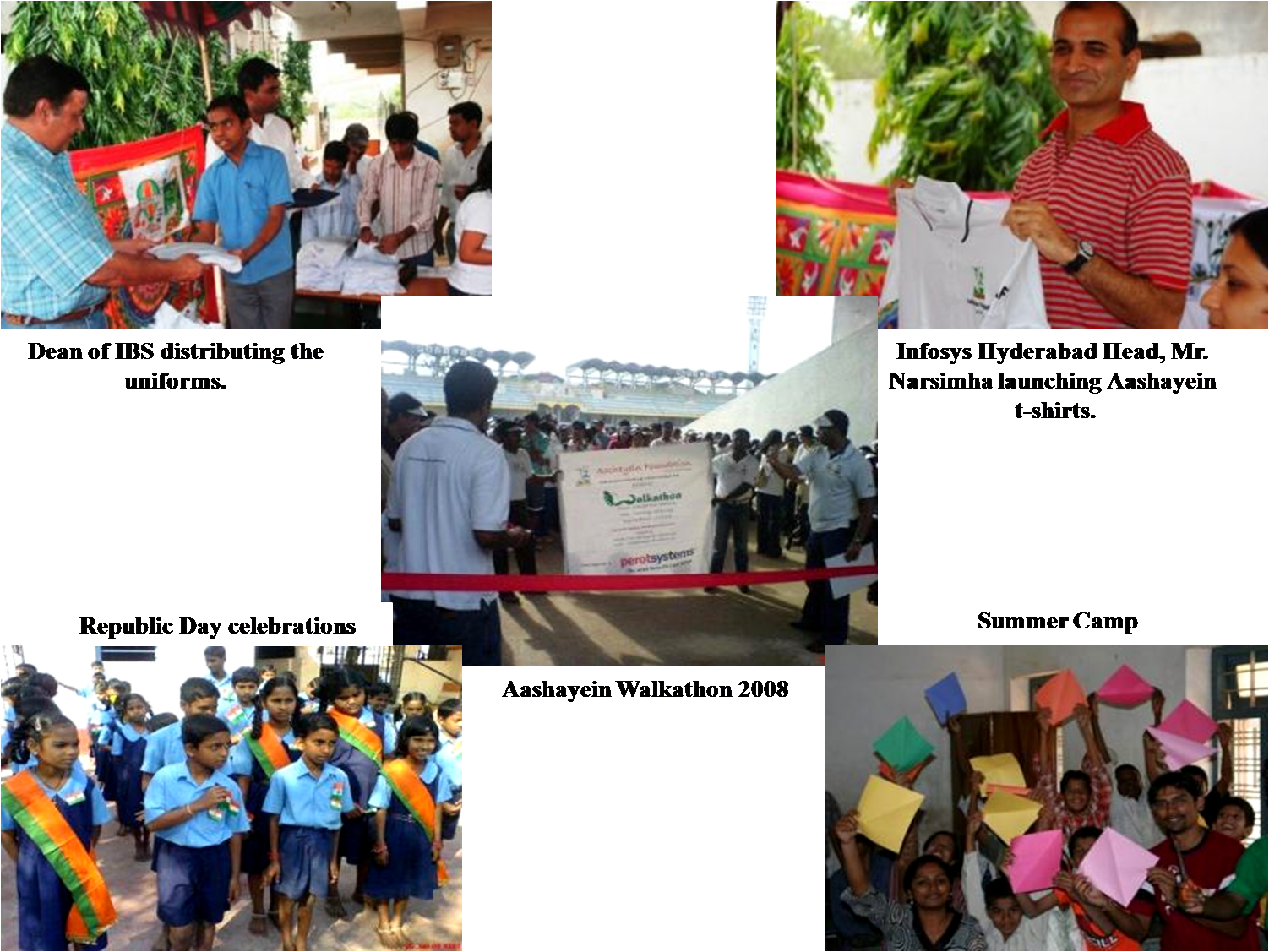
Events

Aashayein Waves:
Date: 16 June 2007 Venue: Kanamangala Village, Karnataka
Target Audience: Students and local villagers Total number of people who were attended: 250

Independence Day Celebrations:
Date: 15 August 2007 Venue: Government School, Dairy Colony, Bangalore
Target Audience: Students and volunteers of Aashayein Foundation Total number of students who participated: 140

Choti Si Asha
Date: 7 October 2007 Venue: Ganesh Bagh, Bhagwan Mahaveer Jain Road, Bangalore
Target Audience: 70 kids of BMKS, their parents, 300 students from three orphanages: Sumangali Ashram (RT nagar), Asha deep (Queens Road) and Sneha Nilaya (Lanford gardens) Total number of students who participated: 600

Children's Day Celebration:
Date: 17 November 2007 Venue: Cafeteria Oracle Office, Banargatta Main Road, Bangalore
Target Audience: Students of Government School Dairy Colony and Government School SG Palya Total number of students who participated: 250

One year Celebration
Date: 6 January 2008 Venue: Little Sister of the Poor, Hosur Road, Bangalore
Target Audience: Members of Aashayein Foundation and little helping hands. Total Number of Members who participated: 60

ART Mela
Date: 2 February 2008 Venue: Sahakari Vidya Kendra, Jayanagar, Bangalore
Target Audience: Students of Sahakari Vidya Kendra. Total Number of Students who participated: 300

Aashayein Weekend Summer Camp
Date: 5 April to 11 May 2008 Venue: Sahakari Vidya Kendra, Jayanagar, Bangalore
Target Audience: 5th, 6th and 7th Standard Students of Sahakari Vidya Kendra. Total Number of Students who are participating: 30

Aashayein Weekend Summer Camp, Hyderabad
Date: 20 April to 13 July 2008 Venue: HCHW (Hyderabad Council of Human Welfare) Home, Golconda, Hyderabad
Target Audience: Residential Children of HCHW Home. Total Number of Students who participated: 100

Session for Trainers & Volunteers of Aashayein Foundation
Date: 22 June 2008 Venue: HCHW (Hyderabad Council of Human Welfare) Home, Golconda, Hyderabad
Target Audience: Trainers and volunteers from Aashayein, Hyderabad Duration: 2 Hrs.

Uniform Distribution to 100 children
Date: 6 July 2008 Venue: HCHW (Hyderabad Council of Human Welfare) Residential Home, Golconda, Hyderabad
Target Audience: Residential Children of HCHW Home. Total Number of Students who participated: 100

Aashayein Week at IBS, Hyderabad
Date: 11-15 Aug 2008 Venue: ICFAI Business School, Hyderabad
Target Audience: B-School students and children Total Number of Students who participated: 300

INDRADHANUSH '08, Hyderabad
Date: 21 December 2008 Venue: RadhaKrishna Balika Bhavan, Hyderabad
Target Audience: Children of the Aashram Total Number of Students who participated: 250

Movie Screening for a Cause '08, Hyderabad
Date: 30 May 2008 Venue: PVR Cinemas Multiplex, Hyderabad
Target Audience: Children Total Number of Students who participated: 150
