= Garth Smith (disambiguation) =

Garth Smith may refer to:

- Garth Smith (born 1955) is a British bassist.
- Garth Smith (curler) (born 1969), Canadian curler
- Garth Smith (musician, born 1960), LDS musician
