= Masa Fukuda =

Japanese-American songwriter, music arranger, and choir director

Masafumi "Masa" Fukuda (福田真史; born in 1976) is a Japanese-American songwriter, music arranger, and choir director. He is the director and founder of One Voice Children's Choir.

Born in Osaka, Japan, he was a music prodigy, having composed his first piano song when he was 4. He enrolled in the Yamaha Music School when he was eight, learning musical composition and how to work with musical ensembles. As a sophomore in high school, he participated in a student exchange program at the Meridian School, a private school in Provo, Utah. He encountered Brigham Young University (BYU) professors whose strong teaching skills convinced him to attend BYU.

At BYU, he won a contest for nearby composers to write music for sale as soundtracks during the 2002 Winter Olympics in Salt Lake City, Utah. He asked 1,621 elementary school students to help him make the commemorative Olympic CD "Light Up the Land". Some of those students performed as the 2002 Winter Olympic Children's Choir and Fukuda volunteered to train them. Once the Olympics had ended, the children wanted to continue to perform together, so Fukuda started One Voice Children's Choir.

== Early life ==
Fukuda was born in Takatsuki, Osaka Prefecture, in Japan in 1975 or 1976. Cultural traditions dictated that as the only son of a dentist father, he eventually would assume control of the family business, but Fukuda's father very quickly realized that Fukuda was best suited for another profession. Attracted to the record player and piano in his family home, Fukuda said, "Ever since I can remember, I was attracted to anything that makes sound." A music prodigy, he was a four-year-old when he composed his first piano song, "Lonely Winter". Beginning when he was eight, he attended the Yamaha Music School, which The Salt Lake Tribune called a "challenging and exclusive" school that provided him a "college-level education" in musical composition and taught him how to collaborate with musical ensembles. He learned "theory, composition, arrangement, keyboard, ensemble, sight reading, productions and recording". When he was 12, he was certain he desired to be a music producer.

In his second year of high school, he elected to participate in a student exchange program at the Meridian School, a private school in Provo, Utah. At Meridian, he encountered BYU music professors, who impressed him with their strong teaching, convincing him to enroll at BYU. He served as a missionary in Hiroshima for the Church of Jesus Christ of Latter-day Saints (LDS Church) before starting at BYU. For a few years after he received a music degree, he served as an arranger of scripture videos for corporations.

== Music career ==
In 2002, he and songwriter Jeannine Lasky wrote songs for The Power Within, an album that featured themes of "love, courage, hope, faith and living together in peace". Over 1,600 Utah children performed the songs with Paul Engemann, Alex Boyé, and other singers. Fukuda was inspired to work on the project after listening to the band Alabama's song "Angels Among Us", telling the Deseret News that he wished there were more "songs that are uplifting yet not necessarily religious". In 2005, "His Endless Gift of Love", the song he co-wrote with Lasky received a Pearl Award in the "Holiday Recording" category.

While at BYU, he heard of a contest for nearby composers to write music for sale as soundtracks during the 2002 Winter Olympics in Salt Lake City, Utah. He and Lasky wrote the song "It Just Takes Love" on an impulse, not expecting to win because he felt that others like Kurt Bestor and the Mormon Tabernacle Choir were far better than he. In 2001, Fukuda and Gael Shults enlisted the aid of 1,621 students from 69 elementary schools in the Alpine, Nebo, and Provo school districts, to make a commemorative CD, "Light Up the Land". He sent the song to the organizers, and his song was selected among other songs for the Olympic CD and received two Pearl Awards. Some of the students who volunteered to sing for the CD were "children of light" for the Olympics' Open Ceremony and Closing Ceremony. Fukuda offered to train and supervise the students during Olympic events. Their group was the 2002 Winter Olympic Children's Choir.

=== One Voice Children's Choir ===
After the Olympics were over, the student performers had formed strong friendships, and about 25 of them told Fukuda they hoped to keep performing with each other. By September 2003, the group grew to 130 members. In a 2015 interview with the Deseret News, Fukuda said, "We had performed a lot together, so we decided to do it." Fukuda and Shults served as the choir's co-directors. Originally called the 2002 Winter Olympic Children's Choir, by 2003, the group was called Studio A Children's Choir. In 2005, the choir was renamed One Voice Children's Choir. It became a nonprofit organization and has an advisory board. According to [The Salt Lake Tribune's David Burger, Fukuda's aim is "to create a nurturing, tolerant environment with high standards and a commitment to singing uplifting songs".

Around 2003, Fukuda's nonagenarian grandmother visited an Osaka, Japan, store and noticed a poster that had John Lennon's photo. His grandmother brought it to her son, wondering whether Fukuda would want to participate in the music contest. Fukuda created a CD with several songs and sent it to the contest organizers who chose his Christmas song, "Innocence of Youth", as a finalist. They invited Fukuda, singer Jay Williams, and 12 members of the Studio A Children's Choir (a precursor to One Voice) to sing the song in Japan. Given a nine-day notice, they hurriedly raised money and obtained passports for the trip. The group won the grand prize, the John Lennon International Music Award, which was presented by Lennon's wife, Yoko Ono.

== Personal life ==
Early in his life, Masa became a member of the LDS Church. Fukuda's first marriage was in October 2009. At his Sandy, Utah, house, Fukuda writes and arranges music from 10 p.m. to 6 a.m. in his basement studio. He sleeps only three or four hours a day, rising at 9 a.m. or 10 a.m.

A 2015 article in the Deseret News noted that although Fukuda has been "living in the U.S. on and off" for over two decades, he cannot get American citizenship. Owing to his visa situation, he has had to fly back to Japan on multiple occasions. This has caused him to be away from the One Voice Children's Choir for three to nine months at a time, though he organized the choir's practices and arranged their songs through emails. Immigration laws prohibit him from being paid by the choir. He has been able to receive money in a roundabout way through musicians who contact him seeking child singers. Because Fukuda is familiar with his students, the musicians frequently pay him to be the record producer and arranger on ventures both with and without children.

Masa Fukuda met Catherine Alyssa Eatman, a Granger High School Japanese teacher, in July 2015 after they were introduced by a friend whose daughter was in his choir and who knew them both. Both had been LDS church missionaries in Japan and graduated from BYU. They married in October 2015. At their wedding, he sang Alyssa's favorite song, "Yellow" by Coldplay.
