= ICFAI Foundation for Higher Education =

Indian university in Hyderabad, Telangana

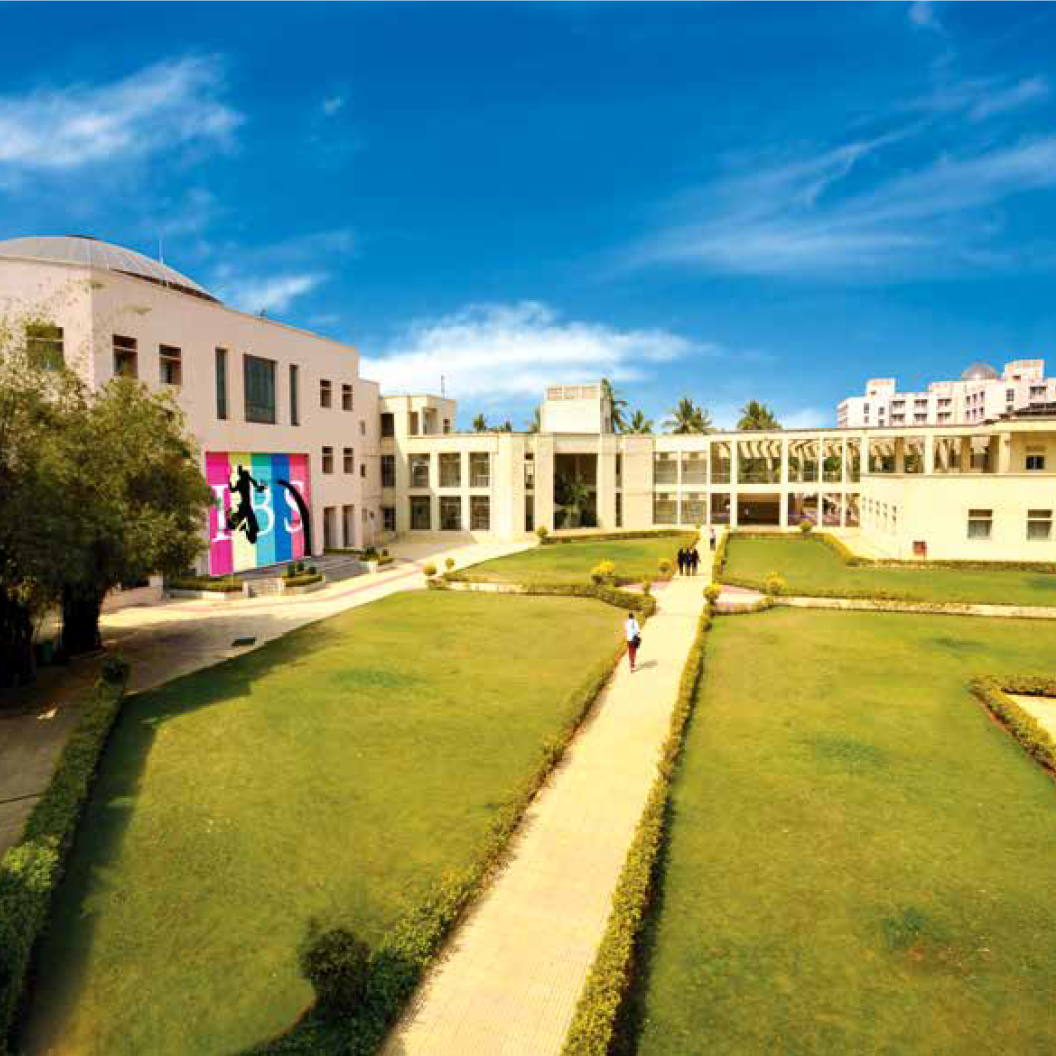
- IFHE campus
- Motto: Meritum Ethicus
- Type: Private deemed university
- Established: 1984; 42 years ago
- Founder: N. J. Yashaswi
- Parent institution: Institute of Chartered Financial Analysts of India
- Affiliations: UGC, AICTE, NAAC, AIU, ACU
- Chancellor: Dr. C. Rangarajan
- Vice-Chancellor: Dr. A. Vinay Kumar
- Location: Survey No. 156/157, IFHE-IBS Campus, Donthanapally Shankarapalli Road, Hyderabad, India, Hyderabad, Telangana, 501203, India; 17.42045°N 78.21785°E
- Campus: 91 acres (37 ha); Urban
- Colours: Blue and Red
- Website: ifheindia.org

The ICFAI Foundation for Higher Education (IFHE) is a private deemed-to-be-university established under Section 3 of the UGC Act, 1956. It is located in Donthanapally, Shankarapally Road, Hyderabad.

IFHE is National Assessment and Accreditation Council (NAAC) A++ Grade University.

== History ==
IFHE, founded by N.J. Yasaswy, is promoted by the ICFAI Group. The Institute of Chartered Financial Analysts of India (ICFAI), a non-profit educational society in Telangana, India, has established Universities and standalone business schools in different parts of India. ICFAI was founded by N.J. Yasaswy, Besant C. Raj and Prasanna Chandra in 1984.

In Hyderabad, the ICFAI Business School Hyderabad (IBS Hyderabad) was established by ICFAI in 1995. In 2008, the institution obtained deemed-to-be-university status with the name 'ICFAI Foundation for Higher Education'. IBS Hyderabad became its first constituent as IFHE's Faculty of Management.

Abid Hussain was appointed the first Chancellor of IFHE, while J Mahender Reddy became the Vice Chancellor. After Abid Hussain's demise in 2012, C. H. Hanumantha Rao became the Chancellor. The current Chancellor is C. Rangarajan since 2015.

The Faculty of Science and Technology and the Faculty of Law was started after receiving approval from UGC in 2010. The School of Architecture was established in 2018.

== Faculties and schools ==
=== Faculty of Management ===
The Faculty of Management at IFHE is IBS Hyderabad, and the major programs offered at IBS Hyderabad are MBA, PhD and BBA. It has adopted the case method of pedagogy, and has been recognised as one of the world's top case publishing schools.

As of 2020, IBS Hyderabad is the only institution in India that is offering Association to Advance Collegiate Schools of Business (AACSB)-accredited programs at the undergraduate, post graduate and doctoral levels. IBS Hyderabad has been SAQS (South Asian Quality Assurance System) accredited, since 2006, an accreditation conferred by The Association of Management Development Institutions in South Asia (AMDISA).

In 2020, IBS Hyderabad was ranked 25th among the Management schools in India in the NIRF rankings.

=== Faculty of Science and Technology (IcfaiTech) ===
IcfaiTech (Faculty of Science & Technology) is a constituent unit of the ICFAI Foundation for Higher Education (IFHE).

=== Faculty of Law ===
The Faculty of Law, commonly known as ICFAI Law School, is a constituent of IFHE started after getting the appl from UGC in 2010. The undergraduate programs offered by the Faculty of Law are approved by the Bar Council of India.

=== School Of Architecture ===
The ICFAI School of Architecture (ISArch) was established in the year 2018 and offers a five-year full-time B.Arch. The degree program is recognized by the Council of Architecture, New Delhi.

== Ranking and accreditation ==
=== Accreditation by NAAC ===
IFHE has received the NAAC Accreditation 'A++' Grade with an Institutional CGPA score of 3.59 out of 4.

=== Graded Autonomy ===
IFHE was accorded autonomy by UGC in 2018, one of the 52 universities in India to receive autonomy. The UGC granted graded autonomy Category II to IFHE.
