= Meridian School =

Meridian School may refer to:

- Meridian School (Utah) in Springville, Utah
- Meridian School, Royston, a defunct school in Royston, Herefordshire, England
