= Meridian School (Utah) =

- Meridian School's logo

Location
- Orem, Utah; United States; 40°10′02″N 111°38′11″W

Information
- Type: Independent, college-prep, non-denominational, liberal arts
- Motto: There shall always be possibilities.
- Established: 1989
- CEEB code: 450319
- Head of school: Tasi Young
- Grades: Preschool to twelfth grade
- Gender: Coeducational
- Mascot: Mongoose
- Website: meridianschool.org

Meridian School is a private non-denominational liberal arts school in Springville, Utah, serving students from preschool to twelfth grade.

Founded in 1989, the school was established because the relocation of the private Waterford School from Provo, Utah, to Salt Lake City metropolitan area left a void in Utah County, Utah. In 2004, Meridian bought a 14-acre private park from Geneva Steel, planning to construct a school there, but the location lacked utilities, which stymied construction. In 2008, after 19 years at their first location, Meridian School moved to Orem, Utah, renting the building from Christ Evangelical Church.

The school closed in 2010 because of financial problems and declining enrollment. In 2011, the school reopened after undergoing a restructuring where it received financial backing from Align International Education Group, an international investing firm. The school signed an agreement with Beijing No.4 High School to share materials.

== History ==
=== Foundation ===
The word "meridian" refers to the hour of noon — the time of day when the sun is at its highest point. It is most brilliant and strong and gives all living things the necessary light to grow and develop. Meridian symbolizes the brightness of hope that we see in students from diverse backgrounds. It represents the connection between teachers and students, knowledge and learning.

— Meridian School Student Handbook
2015–2016

Meridian School was founded in 1989. A void had been left in Utah County, Utah, after the private Waterford School had relocated from Provo, Utah to Salt Lake City metropolitan area. The school was formed by a few Brigham Young University professors, nearby businessmen, and Waterford parents. The school was based at 931 E. Third North, the former location of Waterford School, and rented the building from the Roman Catholic Diocese of Salt Lake City. The school chose its mascot as the mongoose because the mongoose is "small but tough, quick and tenacious". For the 1989–1990 school year, tuition was set at $2,500 per pupil and $2,000 for every subsequent sibling. The school aimed to rely on parent volunteers and focus on a liberal arts education. Serving students from preschool to twelfth grade, Meridian also taught students Mormon catechism. Hal Miller was the school's headmaster when it opened in 1989, and Kevin Clyde took over as headmaster in 1991.

In 2004, Meridian bought a private park at Geneva Road and Interstate 15 owned by Geneva Steel's employee group Geneva Recreation Association, planning to move their campus there by 2005. The 14-acre site lacked utilities, which posed an issue for construction and preventing Meridian from moving there. In 2008, after spending 19 years at their original location, Meridian moved to 280 S. 400 East in Orem, Utah, renting the property from Christ Evangelical Church.

=== Closing and reopening ===
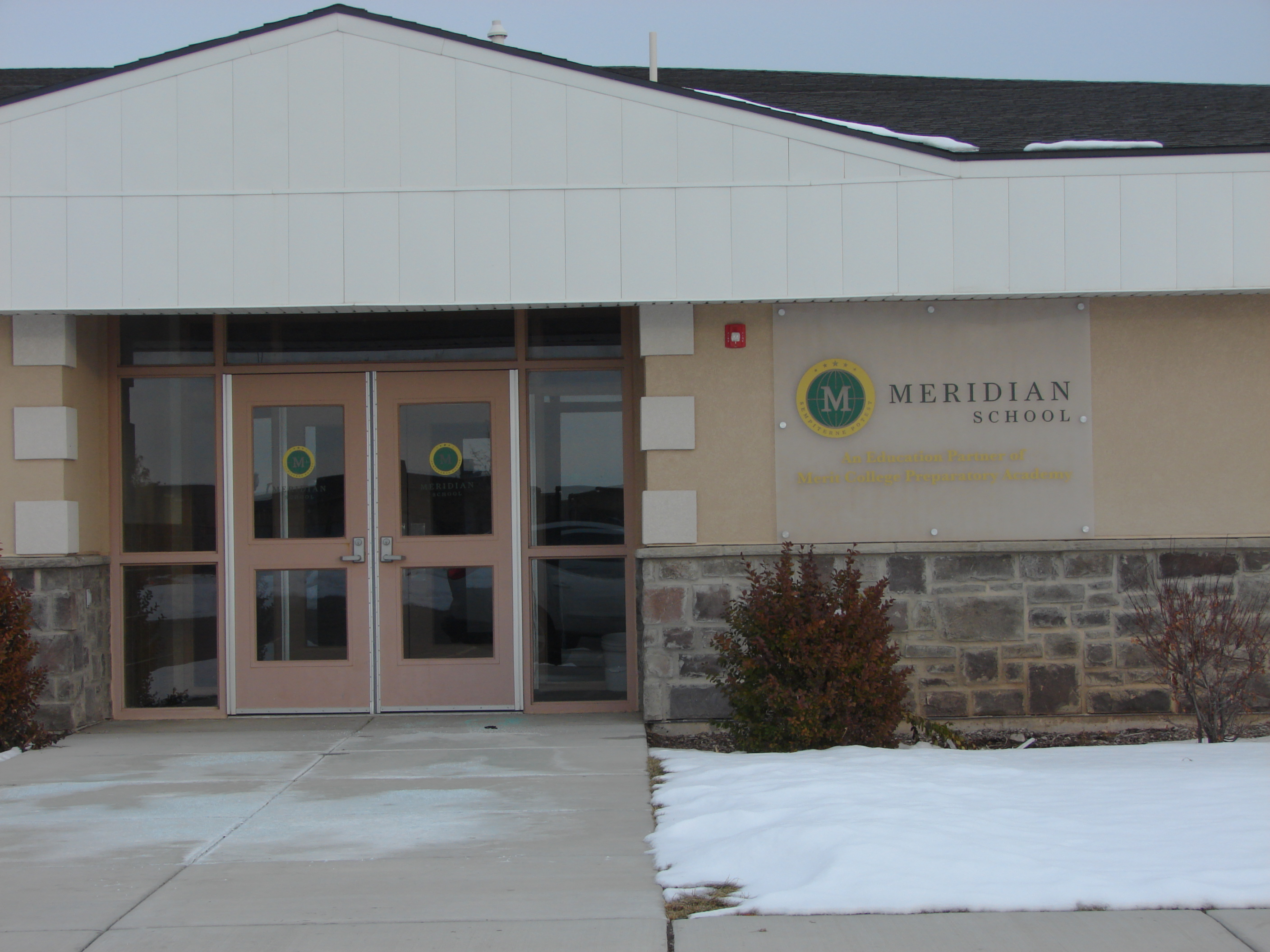
The Meridian School campus at Merit Academy in Springville, Utah, January 2016

In the late 2000s, roughly 10% of Meridian School's students were from a foreign student exchange program. The foreign students largely came from Asia and Central America. In the 2009–2010 school year, 170 students attended the school. But in the 2010–2011 school year, only 100 students were enrolled at the beginning of the year. The school's new head, Dan Smith, a Meridian School alumnus, told the Daily Herald that 100 was a "fragile number" and that "it started changing quickly. We did see something like a run on the banks." The school closed on August 19, 2010, owing to financial issues and diminishing student enrollment. In December 2010, parents announced their plans to reopen Meridian as a for-profit school in its earlier location in Provo with former Meridian part-time teacher Tasi Young as its leader. They believed that a for-profit structure would be more sustainable than a non-profit one.

In the 2011–2012 school year, the school underwent at restructuring and reopened after receiving lasting financial backing from Align International Education Group, an international investing firm. Daniel Wong, a student's father who had international finance experience, contacted the school, spearheading the reopening, and was joined by teachers, parents, and Chinese businesspeople. Meridian signed a "cooperation agreement" with Beijing No.4 High School, a widely known high school in China, in which the two schools would jointly use materials. Meridian planned to have a student exchange program, a teacher exchange program, and summer camps in China and the United States. Roughly 20% of Meridian's high school students in the first year of the agreement would be from China.

In the 2013–2014 school year, some Meridian teachers created a new school called Arches Academy at the same location in Orem previously used by Meridian. The new school moved away from being a for-profit concentrated on international studies to a non-profit focused on the local community. Arches Academy teaches Singapore math, balanced literacy, and FranklinCovey's The Leader in Me curriculum.

== Notable alumni ==
- Masa Fukuda – founder and director of One Voice Children's Choir. In his second year of high school, Fukuda elected to participate in a student exchange program at Meridian School. At the school, he encountered Brigham Young University music professors, who impressed him with their strong teaching, convincing him to enroll at BYU.
