= ICFAI University, Himachal Pradesh =

Private university in Himachal Pradesh, India

Coordinates: 30.8767°N 76.8746°E

- Type: Private
- Established: 2011
- Affiliations: UGC
- Chancellor: V. N. Rajasekharan Pillai
- Vice-Chancellor: Dr. Keshav Sharma
- Location: Kallujhanda, Solan, Himachal Pradesh, India
- Website: www.iuhimachal.edu.in

ICFAI University, Himachal Pradesh, or by its full name Institute of Chartered Financial Analysts of India University, Himachal Pradesh is a private university located at the HIMUDA Education Hub, near the village Kallujhanda, Solan district, Himachal Pradesh, India. The university was established in 2011 by the Institute of Chartered Financial Analysts of India Trust through the Institute of Chartered Financial Analysts of India University (Establishment and Regulation) Act, 2011. The university offers higher education in the fields of management, science and technology.

== Departments ==
The university comprises two faculties, Faculty of Management Studies and Faculty of Science and Technology.
