= National Institute of Agricultural Extension Management =

Business institute in India

National Institute of Agricultural extension
- Other names: MANAGE
- Type: Autonomous, Under Ministry of Agriculture, Government of India
- Established: 1987
- Director: Dr. Saravanan Raj ,
- Postgraduates: 132 PGDM(ABM)
- Location: Hyderabad, Telangana, India
- Campus: Urban
- Language: English
- Colours: Green and white
- Website: www.manage.gov.in

National Institute of Agricultural Extension Management, known as MANAGE, formerly National Centre for Management of Agricultural Extension at Hyderabad, is an autonomous extension and agribusiness management institute located in Hyderabad, Telangana, India. The aim of the institute is to instill managerial and technical skills to Extension Officers, managers, scientists and administrators in the agricultural economy, to enable them to provide support and services to farmers and fishermen for practicing sustainable agriculture.

== History ==
The institute was established in 1987 as the 'National Centre for Management of Agricultural Extension at Hyderabad', by the Ministry of Agriculture, Government of India as an autonomous institute, from which its acronym MANAGE is derived. Its status was elevated to that of a National Institute in 1992 and re-christened with its present name - the National Institute of Agricultural Extension Management(MANAGE)

Recently, MANAGE Hyderabad received the "Education Leadership Award", Telangana Education Leadership Awards - 2018.

== See also ==
- List of business schools in Hyderabad, India
