= College of Defence Management =

Indian defence training college

- Other name: CDM
- Former name: Institute of Defence Management
- Motto in English: Victory Through Excellence
- Type: Defence Service Training Institute
- Established: December 1970; 55 years ago
- Commandant: Air Vice Marshal G. K. J. Reddy
- Location: Secunderabad, Telangana, India; 17°50′15″N 78°56′30″E
- Website: cdm.gov.in

The College of Defence Management (CDM) is an Indian defence service training institution imparting management training to defence servants. CDM is entrusted with the responsibility of instilling contemporary management thoughts, concepts and practices in the senior leadership of the three services.

It is an educational institute sponsored by India's Ministry of Defence, which provides scientific and management education to Indian Armed Forces officers. The institute, considered as the only exclusive college in Asia for defence management training to the Armed Forces, is run under the management of the Indian Armed Forces and is located in Sainikpuri in Secunderabad.

== Profile ==
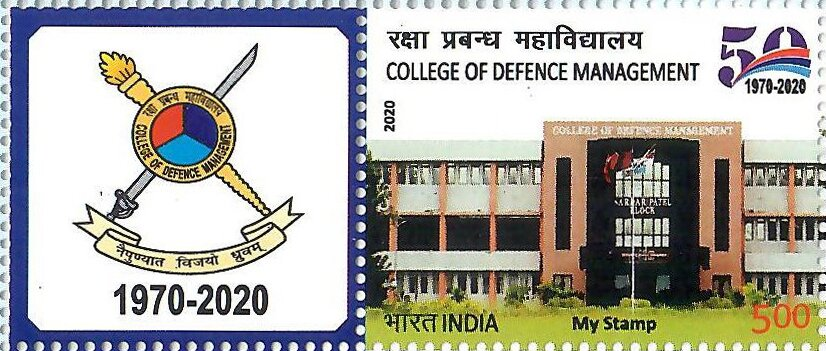
College of Defence Management, 50th anniversary stamp, 2020

The College of Defence Management had its origin in December 1970 under the name, the Institute of Defence Management (IDM), as a part of the Military College of Electronics and Mechanical Engineering (MCEME), with Brigadier V. Dhruva as the founder Director, for providing the Defence Services officers with modern management training.

CDM started its first batch of Long Defence Management Course (LDMC) in March 1971 with 44 students. This has since been upgraded to cover three levels of courses, at Masters, MPhil and doctoral levels. By 1978, the college had four functional faculties such as Faculty of Organization Behavior, Faculty of Decision Analysis, Faculty of Research and Consultancy and Faculty of Training Support (the Faculty of Information Systems was added in January 2004). In 1983, CDM was accepted as a cooperating member of the All India Management Association. CDM was re-designated, in April 1985, as the College of Defence Management. In 1986, the All India Management Association certified the LDM Course as an Advanced Course of Instruction in Defence Management.

Osmania University, in August 1994, gave accreditation to CDM courses and, in March 2005, recognized it as a national centre for conducting research in management studies. The college provides research and consultancy services to the three services as well as undertakes projects on behalf of them. It also serves the public and private sector by holding management sessions.

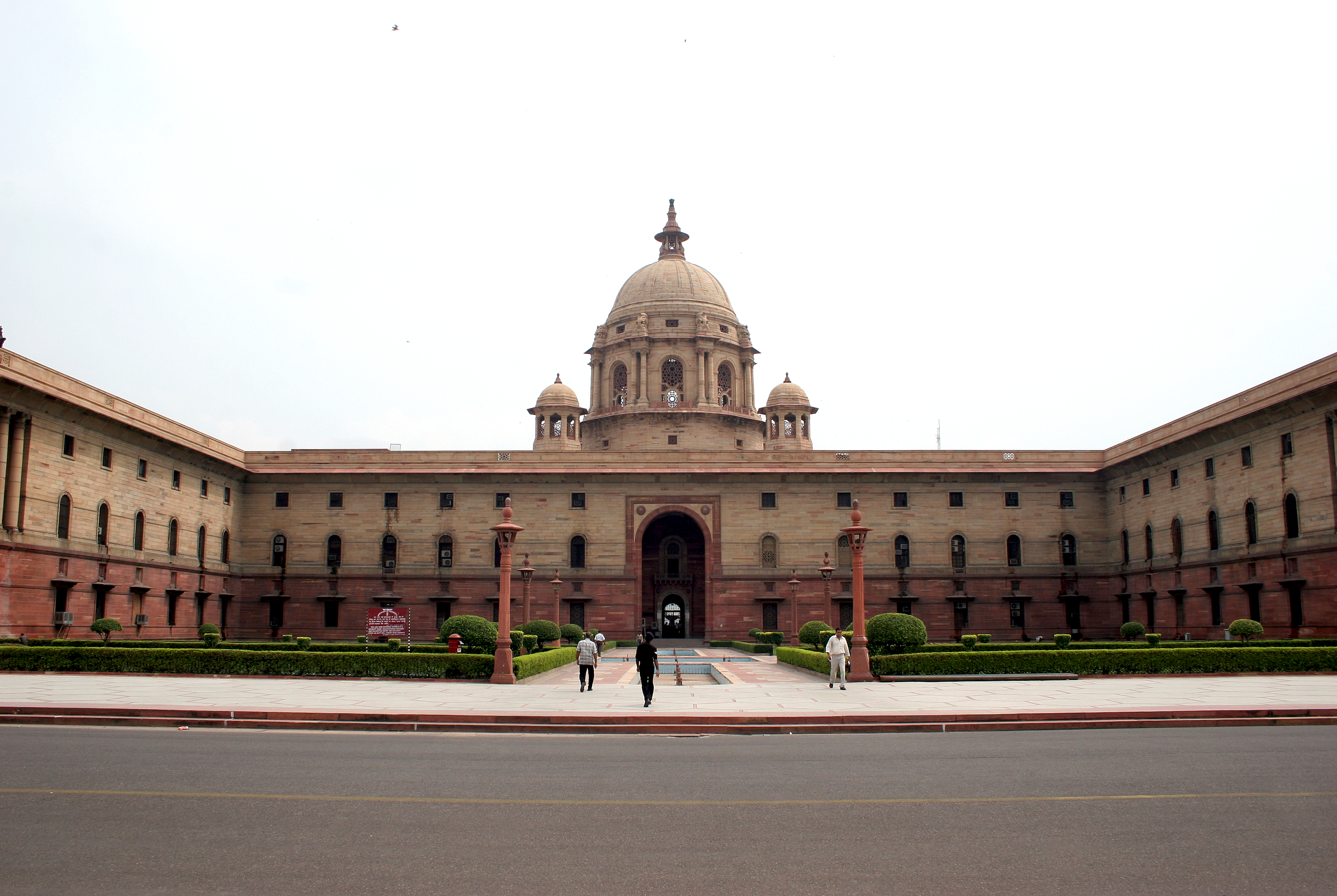
The HQ of the Ministry of Defence

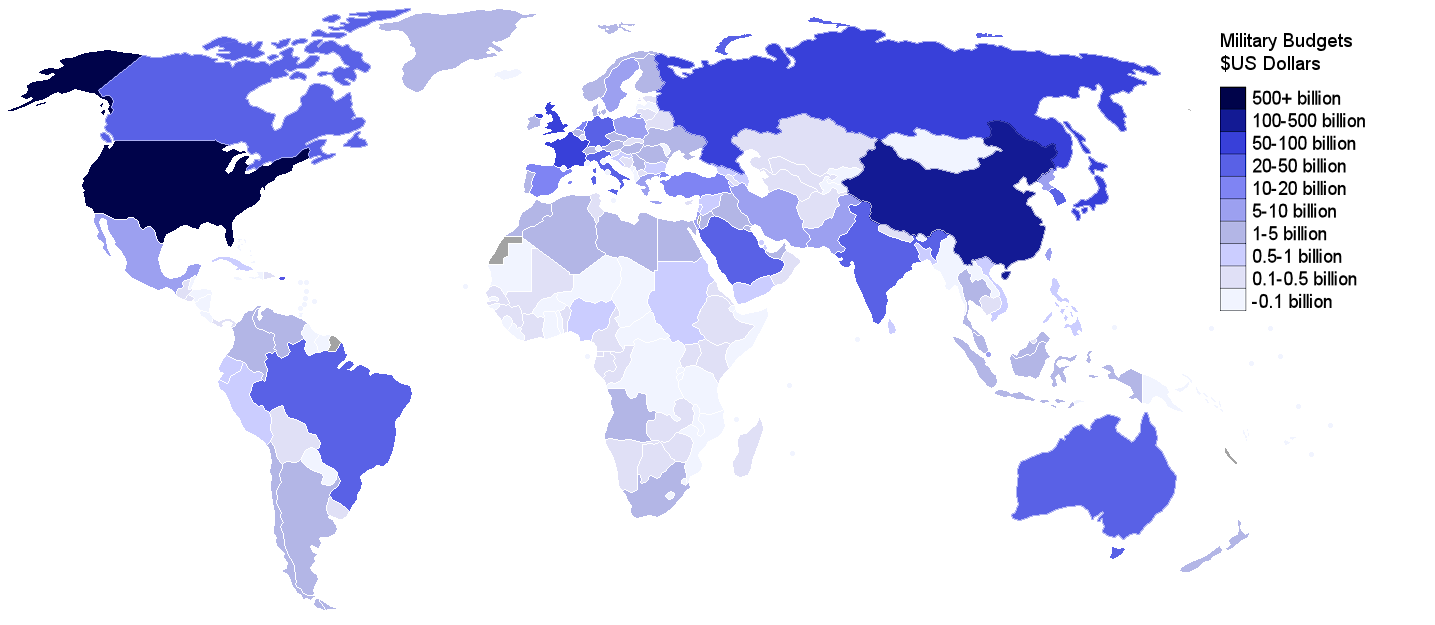
Military spending of countries around the world

== Mandate ==
The college was established with a dual set of mandates with regard to the two lines of management studies.

Higher Defence Management Course

- Understand the national security imperatives and the defence planning process in order to effectively contribute towards perspective planning in the armed forces.
- Enhance leadership potential and human skills through an understanding of contemporary leadership concepts, human behaviour and motivational process.
- Understand the process of organisational development and interventions through application of management principles and innovative training concepts in the armed forces.
- Gain sufficient exposure to management concepts and quantitative techniques for effective planning and execution of logistics in a Single and integrated service environment.
- Acquire a clear understanding of economic concepts and their application in the armed forces, especially in the areas of financial planning, budgeting and controlling.
- Leverage information systems to add value to operational planning process using analytical decision making in a net centric environment.
- Leverage the power of quantitative techniques as aids to decision making in the contextual domain of situations relevant to operational and logistic aspects in the armed forces.
- Understand nuances of efficiently managing various facets of defence projects.
- Develop understanding of systems approach, so as to optimally exploit the management concepts and quantitative, as well as qualitative techniques for pragmatic decision making.
- Gain an insight into the research methodology required to carry out an in-depth study of management problems, so as to evolve workable solutions.

Senior Defence Management Course

- Enhance awareness through an exposure to contemporary concepts in organisational behaviour.
- Appreciate current trends in organisational interventions for enhancing organisational effectiveness.
- Understand the process of defence planning so as to be able to appreciate the complexities of perspective planning and force structuring.
- Augment decision making capabilities through systems approach, using quantitative as well as qualitative techniques and exploiting IT applications.
- Understand the fundamentals of macro economic issues with particular emphasis on financial planning in the armed forces.
- Acquire understanding of issues related to logistics in the armed forces for optimal utilisation of resources.
- Relate to aspects of information technology, so as to harness its potential as a force multiplier while exploiting it in a secure environment.

== List of commandants ==
| S.No | Name | Appointment Date | Left Office | Notes |
|---|---|---|---|---|
| 1 | Brigadier V. Dhruva, AVSM | August 1970 | May 1973 | First Commandant of CDM |
| 2 | Air Commodore R. J. M. Upot, AVSM | May 1973 | December 1975 | |
| 3 | Commodore H. S. Punia | December 1975 | August 1977 | |
| 4 | Brigadier B. P. Upasani | August 1977 | November 1980 | |
| 5 | Air Commodore P. K. Puri, AVSM | December 1980 | December 1983 | Later served as Commandant of the National Defence College |
| 6 | Rear Admiral A. Ghosh | March 1984 | October 1984 | First Two Star Officer to seve as Commandant |
| 7 | Rear Admiral R. S. Sharma, AVSM, VSM | October 1984 | June 1986 | |
| 8 | Major General D. K. Mehta | June 1986 | February 1989 | |
| 9 | Air Vice Marshal S. Kulkarni, VM | March 1989 | April 1991 | Later served as Commandant of the National Defence College |
| 10 | Rear Admiral S. C. Gupta, VSM | April 1991 | April 1993 | |
| 11 | Major General S. P. Jain | May 1993 | March 1995 | |
| 12 | Air Vice Marshal T. J. Master, AVSM | April 1995 | June 1997 | Later served as Air Officer Commanding-in-Chief Training Command |
| 13 | Rear Admiral R. M. Khetarpal | March 1988 | August 1999 | |
| 14 | Major General K. C. Padha, VSM | September 1999 | July 2001 | |
| 15 | Air Vice Marshal H. P. S. Sidhu, AVSM, VSM | August 2001 | August 2003 | |
| 16 | Rear Admiral V. Balachandran, AVSM, NM, VSM | August 2003 | July 2005 | |
| 17 | Major General P. K. Mahajan, AVSM | July 2005 | February 2007 | |
| 18 | Air Vice Marshal A. Saikia, AVSM, VM | April 2007 | April 2009 | |
| 19 | Rear Admiral V. S. Batra, VSM | April 2009 | September 2011 | |
| 20 | Major General Sandeep Singh, AVSM, SM, VSM | October 2011 | July 2012 | |
| 21 | Major General N P Gadkari | July 2012 | July 2013 | |
| 22 | Air Vice Marshal Rajeev Sachdeva | August 2013 | September 2015 | |
| 23 | Rear Admiral Dushyant Singh Chouhan | September 2015 | December 2017 | |
| 24 | Major General Sandeep Sharma, VSM, Ph.D | January 2018 | December 2020 | |
| 25 | Air Vice Marshal Pawan Mohey, VSM | December 2020 | January 2022 | |
| 26 | Rear Admiral Sanjay Datt, VSM | January 2022 | May 2024 | |
| 27 | Major General Harsh Chibber, VSM | June 2024 | September 2025 | |
| 27 | Major General G. Srinivas | September 2025 | June 2026 | |
| 28 | Air Vice Marshal G. K. J. Reddy | June 2026 | To date | |

== Courses and affiliations ==
CDM is affiliated to Osmania University for its Masters, MPhil and PhD programs. Efforts are on to set up an Indian National Defence University (INDU) which will soon bring all the Indian defence related institutions under its umbrella.

Master of Management Studies: The course was started as Long Defence Management Course (LDMC), later upgraded to Higher Defence Management Course (HDMC), and was open to selected senior officers of the armed forces, para military forces, MOD and friendly foreign countries. The course envisaged to hone the management skills through knowledge transfer of management concepts and their applications. On 14 August 1994, CDM entered into an agreement with Osmania University whereby the course was recognized as post graduate degree with the title, Master of Management Studies (MMS), awarded by Osmania University.

MPhil: This is a faculty development program and is aimed at the faculty posted at the college, who can pursue their studies at MPhil level as per Osmania University curriculum.

National Center for Research: CDM is an Osmania University recognized centre for doctoral research in management studies, leading to the degree of Doctor of Philosophy (PhD). The program was started on 23 March 2005.

== Departments ==
The college has five functional departments attending to various affairs of the institution.

=== Behavioural science ===
The Faculty of Behavioural Sciences is responsible for the various courses and programs conducted by CDM and covers two areas of functions, each managed by a department.

Department of Organisational Behaviour: The department has set mandates to develop and conduct courses and programs in Organizational Behaviour.

- To enhance leadership potential and human skills through an understanding of contemporary leadership concepts, human behaviour and motivational process.
- To understand the process of organisational development and interventions through the application of contemporary management principles.

Department of Strategic Management: The department acts as a nodal agency for the promotion of strategic concepts in the Armed Forces with regard to national and military security.

- To enable Officers undergoing course to formulate a holistic national security and military strategy and develop strategy implementation plan.
- To develop into a National repository and central focal point for all aspects connected with Management of National Security, Management of Military Security and Defence Planning and for interaction with the agencies within India and abroad.

=== Resource management ===
The Faculty of Resource Management takes care of the training of the officers of the three services in the field of Resource Management with special emphasis on Finance Management and Supply Chain Management. The faculty was started in 1974 as Faculty of Management Techniques and, through a series of name changes, became the Faculty of Resource Management (FRM) in 2011.

=== Decision sciences ===
Originally started in 1977 as the department of Decision Analysis, the department was rechristened as the Faculty of Decision Sciences in 2004. The Faculty's activities are consolidated under three separate departments.

- Department of Operations Research.
- Department of Statistics.
- Department of Project Management

It was through the effort of this faculty, CDM was accorded the status of institutional member of the International Project Management Association (IPMA).

=== Research and consultancy ===
The Faculty of Research and Consultancy looks after the functions of drafting and implementation of organizational set up which include development of organization's mission, vision and objectives, policies and plans and resource allocation for implementation of policies, plans, projects and programs and evaluation of progress.

=== Personnel, administration and training ===
PAT Department attends to the administrative matters which include personnel, infrastructure, budget, welfare and sports. It coordinates the training and curricular activities.

== Joint training exercises ==
CDM has organized or hosted several joint training exercises under various mandates.

Exercise Aman Sena: Exercise Aman Sena was conducted from 21 May to 29 May 2009 under the mandate of Peace Support Operations (PSO), a United Nations mandated platform with India as the coordinating nation. The exercise aimed at streamlining and formalizing joint planning and conduct of UN mandated Multinational Peace Support Operations. The exercise was attended by 80 officers from the armed forces of 14 countries and was a support activity of UN Peace Support Operations.

Exercise Raksha Yojna: Exercise Raksha Yojna is a training exercise on strategic planning, optimization of resources and preparation and implementation of perspective plans.

Exercise Yudh Abhyas (Trishul): This exercise is a war game for the participants of HDMC (MMS) programs and is conducted by the Higher Command Wing of Army War College (AWC) Mhow. The purpose of the exercise is to enable the participants to apply management tools and techniques in pragmatic decision making. The exercise, original started as Exercise Yudh Abhyas has since been renamed as Exercise Trishul.

Exercise Parivartan: Exercise Parivartan is a war game open to the participants from the three services of the armed forces, devised with the objective to train the participants to use modern management tools and techniques in the tactical planning and execution of offensive and defensive operations.

Exercise Parivartan: Exercise Parivartan is a research based exercise where the participants undertake project studies on organizational problems and their solutions.

== Publications ==
The CDM has a regular publication by name Defence Management Journal which had its first issue released in January 1974. The Journal is now released biannually.

== See also ==
- Indian National Defence University
- List of business schools in Hyderabad, India
- Military Academies in India
- Sainik school
