= One Voice Children's Choir =

American children's choir in Utah

- One Voice Children's Choir's logo

Background information
- Also known as: OVCC
- Origin: Utah, United States
- Genres: Pop; Choral music; Christmas; Children's music
- Years active: 2001–present
- Website: Official website
- Choir
- Founder: Masa Fukuda, Choir Members
- Members: 180
- Artistic Director: Michelle Boothe, Tanner DeWaal
- Awards: John Lennon International Music Award, Best of State Award

YouTube information
- Channel: OneVoiceChildrensChoir
- Genre: Music
- Subscribers: 5.1 million
- Views: 1.4 billion
- Last updated: August 19, 2026

One Voice Children's Choir (originally known as the 2002 Winter Olympic Children's Choir and Studio A Children's Choir) is an American children's choir in Utah.

The group was founded by children and Masa Fukuda in 2001 after he composed the song "It Just Takes Love" for the 2002 Winter Olympics in Salt Lake City, Utah. Fukuda asked students to participate in a commemorative CD for the Olympics. Some of the students also were "children of light" performers for the Olympics, whom he volunteered to help train. After the Olympics, 25 students wanted to continue singing together, and Fukuda formed the choir as a nonprofit organization to continue working with them.

One Voice Children's Choir is led by choir director Masa Fukuda and Artistic Directors Michelle Boothe and Tanner DeWaal and has 180 members ages 5–18. Every year, the choir performs around 50 to 70 times. The group meets year-round for once-a-week practices. They perform a vast selection of music such as pop, gospel, classical, Broadway, and patriotic.

In 2003, the choir sang the Christmas song "Innocence of Youth" and won the John Lennon International Music Award after singing in a competition for Yoko Ono. In 2014, One Voice received national attention for their rendition of the Disney song "Let It Go", starring Lexi Walker and Alex Boyé. They were invited to compete in the ninth season of America's Got Talent (AGT) in 2014 and reached the quarterfinals.

== History ==
=== Early history: 2002 Winter Olympics ===
Brigham Young University student, Masa Fukuda, heard about a contest for nearby composers to write music for sale as soundtracks during the 2002 Winter Olympics in Salt Lake City, Utah. He and Jeannine Lasky wrote the song "It Just Takes Love" on an impulse, not expecting to win because he felt that others like Kurt Bestor and the Mormon Tabernacle Choir were far better than he. In 2001, Fukuda and Gael Shults enlisted the aid of 1,621 students from 69 elementary schools in the Alpine, Nebo, and Provo school districts, to make a commemorative CD, "Light Up the Land. He sent the song to the organizers, and his song was selected among other songs for the Olympic CD and received two Pearl Awards. Some of the students who volunteered to sing for the CD were "children of light" for the Olympics' Open Ceremony and Closing Ceremony. Fukuda offered to train and supervise the students during Olympic events. Their group was the 2002 Winter Olympic Children's Choir.

After the Olympics were over, the student performers had formed strong friendships, and about 25 of them told Fukuda they hoped to keep performing with each other. By September 2003, the group grew to 130 members. In a 2015 interview with the Deseret News, Fukuda said, "We had performed a lot together, so we decided to do it." Fukuda and Shults served as the choir's co-directors. Originally called the 2002 Winter Olympic Children's Choir, by 2003, the group was called Studio A Children's Choir. In 2005, the choir was renamed One Voice Children's Choir. It became a nonprofit organization and has an advisory board. According to The Salt Lake Tribune's David Burger, Fukuda's aim is "to create a nurturing, tolerant environment with high standards and a commitment to singing uplifting songs".

=== John Lennon International Music Award ===
Around 2003, Fukuda's nonagenarian grandmother visited an Osaka, Japan, store and noticed a poster that had John Lennon's photo. His grandmother brought it to her son, wondering whether Fukuda would want to participate in the music contest. Fukuda created a CD with several songs and sent it to the contest organizers, who chose his Christmas song, "Innocence of Youth", as a finalist. They invited Fukuda, singer Jay Williams, and 12 members of the Studio A Children's Choir (a precursor to One Voice) to sing the song in Japan. Given a nine-day notice, they hurriedly raised money and obtained passports for the trip. The group won the grand prize, the John Lennon International Music Award, which was presented by Lennon's wife, Yoko Ono.

In 2005, One Voice performed at a Christmas concert hosted by Lex de Azevedo. The same year, members flew to Japan to perform at the Hiroshima Flower Festival, where they performed songs in five languages: English, Japanese, Tongan, Spanish, and an African dialect.

=== "Let It Go" and America's Got Talent ===
In 2014, the choir received national attention after releasing their performance of the Disney song "Let It Go". Their cover starred Lexi Walker, who at the time was 11 years old, and Alex Boyé. Filmed at Ice Castles in Midway, Utah, the video received 1 million views in one day and 18 million in 10 days. The video was played on YouTube over 60 million times by July 2015 and received YouTube Spotlight's "Best Pop Cover" in 2014 award. Time's Joseph C. Lin called One Voice's rendition the best cover of Let It Go.

One Voice was asked to audition for the ninth season of AGT in 2014. 100 members of the choir, including Walker, auditioned on June 22, 2014, singing Ellie Goulding's "Burn". Judges Howard Stern and Heidi Klum praised their performance, voting yes, while judges Mel B and Howie Mandel were less impressed. Mandel voted no, and Stern convinced Mel B to vote yes. They performed on live television for the show's quarterfinals on August 19, 2014, at Radio City Music Hall in New York City and were eliminated. In a 2017 interview with The Salt Lake Tribune, Fukuda said, "You don't see us in competitions … usually". The choir was convinced to perform on AGT because the show paid for their traveling expenses and gave each child a per diem to cover the cost of watching a Broadway show.

== Members and performances ==
Composed of children ages 4–18, One Voice at the beginning had practices in Fukuda's apartment where he would set up 45 folding chairs in his living room. In the past, the group had practices once a week throughout the year. Because of the choir's size and the geographical distribution of its members, some of whom commuted from Wyoming and Idaho, it changed to having two practices a week. The two practices are held in both Utah and Salt Lake counties. Members can attend the more accessible practice. One Voice has roughly 55 to 70 performances yearly. The choir has made several Christmas and Easter CDs and is posting more of its recordings to YouTube. According to a 2015 article in the Deseret News, the 140-member One Voice has biannual auditions, in January and August, while according to a 2017 Broadway World article, the choir has auditions each May. The group does not split singers into different age groups. When boys undergo voice changes, they become tenors. In January 2015, they had a waiting list of 250 children. Sometimes, there are merely six to 10 open spots in a year. After a child has been accepted into the choir, he or she pays a $30 monthly fee and is permitted to stay in the choir until turning 18.

In 2008, it was the host choir for In Harmony, an annual international children's music festival. One Voice has performed at Abravanel Hall during Bestor's annual show "A Kurt Bestor Christmas". They have performed at the Salt Palace during RootsTech. They have collaborated with Ben Rector, David Archuleta, Jenny Oaks Baker, Sam Cardon, Peter Breinholt, Barry Manilow, Janice Kapp Perry, The Piano Guys, Jon Schmidt, Garth Smith, Ryan Shupe, Vocal Point, and Mat & Savanna Shaw. In February 2012, the first members of the choir who had participated in the Olympics performed at the 2002 Winter Games Tenth Anniversary Legacy Event. The group performs at charitable events including those hosted by Operation Smile and the Ouelessebougou Alliance.

== Music style and genres ==
Fukuda directs the choir and does all the musical arrangements, writing for every song roughly six to nine segments. Fukuda told the Deseret News in 2015 that he was raised in Japan where choirs were primarily about "technique and preciseness". Noting that although "those are really important things", he wants the children to find choir enjoyable. They typically have three different parts. Once in a while, they have seven or eight, including four sopranos, two altos, a tenor, and less frequently a high soprano.

The choir performs an eclectic selection of genres including pop music, gospel music, classical music, Broadway musical, and patriotic songs. They have performed songs from Rihanna, Disney, and Ellie Goulding. In a 2003 interview with The Salt Lake Tribune, Fukuda said, "We go anywhere from baroque and classical to R&B and hip-hop. We're media-oriented."
