= Oikos International =

International student organization

oikos International
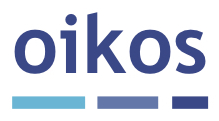
- Founded: 1987 at University of St. Gallen in Switzerland
- Type: Student organization
- Fields: Sustainable management and economics
- Website: www.oikos-international.org

oikos International is an international student organization focusing on economics and management education.

Oikos International has 45 Local Chapters in 23 countries around the world.

== History ==
The first oikos chapter, today known as oikos St. Gallen, was founded on 17 July 1987 at the University of St. Gallen. The original name of the organization was "oikos - Die umweltökonomische Studenteninitiative an der Universität St. Gallen" (Student's initiative for environmental economics). The activities of oikos St.Gallen, consisting of the organization of conferences, workshops and speeches with the participation of academics and representatives of business and society, helped integrate issues of environmental protection to the curricula of economic and management courses at its home University. Furthermore, it contributed to the foundation of several organizations with the focus on ecology, such as Swiss Association for Ecological Management, Institute for Economy and the Environment, and others.

In 1990, oikos Foundation was created. The oikos Foundation closed in 2020 and its activities have been integrated into oikos International.

oikos International, the "umbrella" organization of all oikos branches, was established by 5 Local Chapters in 1998. Its headquarters are based St.Gallen, Switzerland.
