= ICFAI University, Dehradun =

Private university in Uttarakhand, India

The ICFAI University, Dehradun
- Campus of The ICFAI University, Dehradun
- Motto: Meritum Ethicus
- Type: Private state university
- Established: 2003; 23 years ago
- Founder: N. J. Yasaswy
- Affiliations: UGC; NCTE; BCI; PCI; AIU; ACU
- Chancellor: Dr. Uday B. Desai
- Vice-Chancellor: Dr. Ram Karan Singh
- Location: Dehradun, Uttarakhand, India; 30.3629°N 77.8767°E
- Campus: Urban (37 acres)
- Colours: Blue; Red
- Website: www.iudehradun.edu.in

The ICFAI University, Dehradun, officially designated as the Institute of Chartered Financial Analysts of India University, Dehradun, is a private state university located in Dehradun, Uttarakhand, India. Established in 2003 under the statutory mandates of the ICFAI University Act, 2003 (Act No. 16 of 2003), the university operates as a non-affiliating, multi-disciplinary higher education institution sponsored by the Institute of Chartered Financial Analysts of India educational society.

The university comprises five specialized constituent schools that oversee academic curricula spanning management, law, engineering, education, and pharmaceutical sciences.

Globally, the university was ranked 44th under the Industrial Application category by the World's Universities with Real Impact (WURI) in 2020, placed 478th in the Southern Asia region by the QS World University Rankings in 2026, and positioned within the 1501+ band in the 2025 Times Higher Education Impact Rankings; nationally, it is ranked 17th among India's top private universities by the Indian Institutional Ranking Framework (IIRF) in 2026.

== Campus and Infrastructure ==
The university occupies a 37-acre integrated campus located in the Selaqui industrial corridor, Central Hope Town, Dehradun. The existing footprint encompasses 256,500 square feet of built-up structural space designed to accommodate up to 3,000 students, including central workshops, specialized research laboratories, computer clusters, seminar facilities, an academic moot courtroom, and a central library housing digital repositories and global research databases.

=== Campus Expansion ===
To keep pace with rising student enrollment and diversify its programmatic footprint, the university senate approved a series of capital expansion initiatives, expanding the total integrated campus size from 25 acres to 37 acres. Under these sanctioned infrastructure works, active construction protocols include:

- The vertical engineering of an additional floor upon the existing primary Academic Block.
- A structural extension of the Pharmacy building to accommodate newly launched laboratory segments.
- The construction of two high-density residential facilities: a Boys' Hostel (Ground plus 7 floors) and a Girls' Hostel (Ground plus 7 floors).
- The development of a multi-tiered communal Student Mess facility designed as a Ground plus 1 structure.
- The construction of a dedicated Administrative Building, faculty quarters, and a Vice Chancellor's Residence.

== Academic Organization and Faculty ==
The academic architecture of the university is organized across five specialized constituent schools, each administering discrete undergraduate, postgraduate, and doctoral degree pathways tailored to its specific discipline:

- ICFAI Business School (IBS, Dehradun) – Functions as the faculty of management studies. It offers the Master of Business Administration (MBA) and Bachelor of Business Administration (BBA) with specializations in Financial Investment Analysis (FIA). It also hosts a comprehensive doctoral research track leading to a Ph.D. in Management.
- ICFAI Law School (ILS, Dehradun) – Functions as the faculty of jurisprudence. It provides integrated professional frameworks including five-year integrated programs like BA-LLB (Hons.) and BBA-LLB (Hons.), a three-year LLB program for graduates, a specialized Master of Laws (LLM) post-graduate structure, and a Ph.D. in Law. Admission processes align with performance metrics on national competitive examinations such as the Common Law Admission Test (CLAT) or the specialized ICFAI Law School Admission Test (ILSAT).
- ICFAI Tech School (IcfaiTech, Dehradun) – Functions as the faculty of science and technology. It administers computational, mathematical, and foundational engineering curricula. Key programs include the Bachelor of Technology (B.Tech) across specializations like Computer Science & Engineering (CSE), Data Science & Artificial Intelligence, and Mechatronics, alongside B.Tech Lateral Entry pathways. It also offers the Bachelor of Computer Applications (BCA), Master of Computer Applications (MCA), Master of Technology (M.Tech), and Bachelor of Science (B.Sc. Hons.) in Mathematics and Data Science, supplemented by Ph.D. tracks in technical domains. Admission to engineering cohorts is predicated on national matrices such as JEE Main or localized state-level counseling structures.
- ICFAI Education School (IEdS, Dehradun) – Functions as the faculty of teacher training and pedagogical instruction. It coordinates the core professional Bachelor of Education (B.Ed) and Master of Arts in Education (MA Education) curricula, focused on equipping educators with modern instructional design and educational methodologies.
- ICFAI School of Pharmaceutical Sciences (ISPS, Dehradun) – Functions as the faculty of pharmaceutical sciences. It administers professional healthcare tracks including the foundational Bachelor of Pharmacy (B.Pharm) and specialized diplomas aimed at developing industrial competence in pharmaceutical research, medical technology, and pharmacology.

== Centre for AI and Machine Learning ==
The university houses a specialized hub dedicated to computing research and real-world deployment, known as the Centre for AI and Machine Learning (CAIML). The centre functions as a multidisciplinary platform for education, innovation, and application within the fields of Artificial Intelligence, Machine Learning, and Data Science.

The primary objective of CAIML involves the formulation of intelligent algorithms and data-driven systems to address operational challenges across industrial sectors such as healthcare, agriculture, defense, governance, and sustainability. The centre coordinates specialized workshops, technology transfers, and collaborative projects, aligning computational development with global Sustainable Development Goals (SDGs) and ethical engineering frameworks.

== Strategic Academic Linkages and MoUs - ICFAI University, Dehradun ==
The university maintains formal institutional agreements, corporate partnerships, and academic memorandums of understanding (MoUs) to support academic research, curriculum design, and student exchange tracks. These partnerships are managed across its constituent schools through an industrial liaison framework.

=== International Collaborations ===
- Glasgow Caledonian University (Scotland, UK): Formally executed a Letter of Intent through the Caledonian Business School establishing credit-bearing study abroad frameworks and student exchange pathways for business administration tracks.
- ILTES Online Global Academy (IOGA): Executed via the Center for Cyber Law and Innovation at ICFAI Law School, Dehradun to design joint academic architectures focused on emerging technologies, including Blockchain, Cryptocurrency, Digital Assets, and Artificial Intelligence regulatory policy.
- International Engineering and Technology Institute (IETI): A global collaboration framework established with the non-profit academic body to drive international engineering advancements and cross-border academic research panels.
- Kyiv National Economic University (Ukraine): An international exchange treaty signed to support short- and long-term faculty exchanges, collaborative research structures, and undergraduate and graduate student exchange programs.
- University of Economics and Law (Vietnam National University): A formal virtual mobility agreement established to provide a platform for outcome-based academic exchanges and international credit-sharing tracks.

=== National Collaborations ===
- IIT Delhi Virtual Labs: Operates as an official nodal center under the Ministry of Education's National Mission on Education through ICT (NMEICT) to provide remote, online access to specialized laboratory experimentation setups across engineering disciplines.
- Indian Institute of Technology Mandi (IIT Mandi): Signed in 2025 to promote joint academic tracks, collaborative research engineering initiatives, and mutual utilization of institutional research facilities.
- Indian Institute of Technology Roorkee (IIT Roorkee): Established to cultivate regional academic exchanges, joint technological investigations, research scholar transfers, and shared laboratory access frameworks.
- ISHAANAV Nutraceuticals & Ras Bihari Bose Subharti University: Formulated to coordinate localized healthcare educational tracks, practical bio-manufacturing training, and hands-on industrial internships.
- MongoDB & Edunet Foundation: Specialized technology and educational foundations alliances arranged to deliver industrial certifications in NoSQL database structures, cloud computing infrastructure, and technical soft skills training.
- National Law Institute University, Bhopal: A legal education alliance focusing on inter-university collaborative modules centered around data privacy legalities, cybersecurity training systems, and contemporary corporate law tracks.
- National Institute of Securities Markets (NISM): An industry-linked educational pact structured to train financial management students in securities market frameworks and facilitate professional certifications.
- Quality Council of India (QCI): A cooperative arrangement structured to integrate quality assurance frameworks, professional standard benchmarks, and institutional audit methodologies within the university's curriculum design.
- Rural Litigation and Entitlement Kendra (RLEK): A legal aid and social collaboration framework designed to engage law students in human rights advocacy, legal aid clinics, and systemic welfare research for marginalized communities.
- Society for Aerospace Maritime and Defence Studies (SAMDeS): Formulated as a technical alliance with the defense think tank to coordinate multi-disciplinary research projects and track policy updates across aerospace engineering and domestic defense manufacturing sectors.
- Uttarakhand Technical University: A state-level cross-cooperation agreement signed to accelerate academic resource exchange, regional engineering research integration, and mutual infrastructure support.

== Institutional Rankings ==
The engineering, law, management, and multidisciplinary programs of the university's constituent schools have been ranked by external agencies nationally and internationally since 2010, with data from the last three years presented below:

School Name	India Today	Outlook-ICARE	The Week-Hansa	Careers360	IIRF	CSR-GHRDC	QS Asia Matrix	THE Impact (SDGs)
ICFAI Tech School, Dehradun	2026: 131st (National); 2025: 136th (National); 2024: 141st (National)	2026: 58th (Private National); 2025: 64th (Private National); 2024: 63rd (Private National)	2026: 207th (National) / 178th (Private National); 2025: 208th (National)	2026: AAA+ (State Rank); 2025: AAA; 2024: AAA	2026: 30th (Private National Engineering); 2026: 1st (BCA State Rank); 2025: 3rd (State Private)	2026: 5th (Private National); 2025: 6th (Private National)	N/A	N/A
ICFAI Law School, Dehradun	2026: 31st (National); 2025: 33rd (National); 2024: 28th (National)	2026: 12th (Private National Law); 2025: 12th (Private National Law); 2024: 12th (Private National Law)	2026: 17th (National); 2025: 17th (National) / 9th (Private National)	2026: 63rd (Private National Law); 2025: 58th (AAA+ Regional)	2026: 11th (Private National Law); 2025: 12th (Private National Law); 2024: 10th (Private National Law)	2026: 2nd (Private National); 2025: 7th (Private National)	N/A	N/A
ICFAI Business School, Dehradun	2026: 134th (National)	N/A	N/A	2026: AAA+ (Private National); 2025: AAA+ (Private National)	2026: 42nd (Private National MBA); 2026: 2nd (BBA State Rank); 2025: 46th (Private National MBA)	2024: 36th (Private National)	N/A	N/A
ICFAI University, Dehradun (Campus Overall)	2026: 48th (Private National); 2025: 52nd (Private National); 2024: 45th (Private National)	2025: 32nd (State Private)	2026: 41st (Private National & Deemed); 2025: 44th (Private National & Deemed)	By course	2026: 17th (Private National University); 2025: 17th (Corporate & General)	By course	2026: 478th (Southern Asia)	2025: 1501+ Band (Global); 2024: 1501+ Band (Global)

== Notable alumni ==
The university coordinates an active alumni interface across corporate sectors, the judicial system, and the creative media industry. Notable graduates include:

- Chandan Kumar, screenwriter, creative director, and creator of the critically acclaimed Indian streaming comedy-drama series Panchayat. He pursued his bachelor's degree tracks in engineering from the ICFAI Tech School (ITS) Dehradun campus, graduating in 2011.
- Rajratna Ambedkar, legal scholar, social activist, and President of the Buddhist Society of India.
- Amit Mishra, corporate entrepreneur and Founder Director of Impetus Technocare.

== See also ==
- List of law schools in India
- List of universities in India
