= Garth Smith (musician, born 1960) =

- Born: June 8, 1960 (age 66)
- Origin: Brigham City, Utah, United States
- Genres: Gospel; pop
- Occupations: Composer; performer; pianist
- Instrument: Piano
- Years active: 1990–present
- Website: www.garthsmithmusic.com

YouTube information
- Channel: Garth Smith Music
- Years active: 2015–present
- Subscribers: 1.48 thousand
- Views: 883 thousand
- Last updated: August 4, 2026

Garth William Smith (born June 8, 1960) is an American pianist and composer. Since 2014, he has focused on composing uplifting piano arrangements of popular hymns from the Church of Jesus Christ of Latter-day Saints (LDS).

== Early life and education ==
Garth was born in Brigham City, Utah, the son of a senior executive chemical engineer working at Thiokol, G. Ray and JoAnne (Petty) Smith. After taking a short break to serve a mission to the Navajo people of Northern Arizona, Smith completed a college degree in Design Engineering Technology from Brigham Young University, graduating in the class of 1988. Afterwards, Smith accepted a position at Intergraph Corporation in Huntsville, Alabama. Later he moved to Carlsbad, California, to accept a design position with Callaway Golf.

== Music career ==
Smith began his classical musical training on the piano at age five. As a missionary and college student he entertained with his piano skills, including a special performance of a Beethoven sonata to over 15,000 people in the BYU Marriott Center at his college graduation.

Smith has been a member of the American Society of Composers, Authors, and Publishers (ASCAP) and the Nashville Songwriters Association International. In 1999 he was the recipient of the California Country Music Association (CCMA) "Song of the Year" award for the song "Last Call." He has also performed as a keyboardist in jazz, rock, and country bands.

=== Nashville era ===
While living in Alabama, Smith was introduced "Writers in the Round" at the famous Bluebird Cafe in Nashville, Tennessee, a club famous for intimate, acoustic music performed by its composers. Soon, Smith was active participant there, performing his own original compositions.

Smith also participated as both a rehearsal and performance pianist in the local community theaters of Huntsville. He also joined in various local bands touring throughout Northern Alabama and Southern Tennessee. They also participated in local music festivals including Huntsville's annual Panoply Arts Festival.

=== California era ===
Relocating to Southern California in 1996, Smith continued playing in country bands, as well as developing his songwriting abilities. His bands have played at many popular venues such as the Viejas Casino and the San Diego County Fair.

== LDS hymns ==
By 2014, Smith had turned his music to creating artistic arrangements of popular gospel hymns of the LDS Church, producing several albums, music videos and other related works. His work is available through Deseret Book.

=== Albums ===
Smith's first album, released in 2014, is titled Sacred Hymns Arranged and Performed on the Piano. The album was warmly received by Meridian Magazine.

For his second full-length album, How Beautiful Thy Temples, Sacred Hymns, Vol. II (released in 2015), Smith focused on hymns and sacred songs that addressed the beauty and eternal significance of temples. The album charted nationally at #21 on the iTunes Gospel new music chart. Fellow LDS composer Crawford Gates, praised the album, calling it a "fabulous recording."

On 1 September 2016, Smith released his third album of LDS hymn arrangements, Behold the Great Redeemer, Sacred Hymns, Vol. III. This album centered on songs about the Saviour, Jesus Christ. Smith also released his original sheet music, so his arrangements could be performed in church worship services and other religious settings.

His fourth album, A Sacred Christmas, released ahead of the 2017 Christmas season. The album features a variety of Smith's favorite Christmas hymns, and features several guest artists, including Calee Reed, Michael Dowdle, One Voice Children's Choir, and Sun Valley Carolers.

=== Performances ===
Smith frequently travels the country performing free, inspirational music firesides. His 60-minute presentation explores gospel principles found in eight hymns that includes the restoration, prayer, sacrament, forgiveness, and atonement of Jesus Christ.

== Personal life ==
After living for many years in Oceanside, California, he currently resides in Bella Vista, Arkansas, and is a member of the Church of Jesus Christ of Latter-day Saints (LDS Church).

== Honors and awards ==
- 2019 "Inspirational Artist of the Year", presented by the Inspirational Arts Association based in Salt Lake City, Utah. This award was shared with "Advocate of the Arts" award winner President Russell M. Nelson, President of the Church and "Patrons of the Arts" award winners Elder and Sister Tad R. Callister.
