= ICFAI University, Jaipur =

- Type: Non-profit, private – research
- Established: 2011
- Affiliations: UGC, AIU, BCI
- Chancellor: Dr. R. P. Kaushik
- Vice-Chancellor: Dr. Govind Sharan Dangayach
- Location: Agra Road,, Jaipur, Rajasthan, India
- Campus: Urban
- Acronym: IUJ
- Colours: Blue and Red
- Website: Official website

Institute of Chartered Financial Analysts of India University, Jaipur (IUJ) was established under The ICFAI University, Jaipur Act, 2011 (Act No. 26 of 2011) passed by Legislative Assembly of Rajasthan. The university has been notified under Notification No. F. 2(26) Vidhi/2/2011 dated 22 September 2011. The university is sponsored by The ICFAI Society - a not-for-profit educational society established in 1984.

== Programs ==
The ICFAI University, Jaipur offers career-oriented educational programs at doctoral, postgraduate, undergraduate and diploma programs in management, commerce, law and science & technology.

Bachelor of Technology Programs

- B.Tech. in civil engineering
- B.Tech. in electronic and communication engineering
- B.Tech. in computer science
- B.Tech. in mechanical engineering
- Bachelor of Commerce (B.Com.)
- Bachelor of Computer Application (BCA)
- Bachelor of Science (B.Sc.)
- BBA, LLB, MBA, Ph.D.

== Regulatory recognitions ==
The ICFAI University Jaipur is recognized by University Grants Commission (UGC) Member of the Association of Indian Universities (AIU) The Bar Council of India (BCI) granted approval of affiliation for imparting Law programs.

== Awards and recognitions ==
Most Promising Brand – Professional Education, 2014–15 – WBRC SkillTree Great Place to study in India 2014–16 –SkillTree Knowledge Consortium Leading Private University in India 2014–15 – Brand Academy Education Excellence Awards Education Evangelist of India 2013–14 –SkillTree Knowledge Consortium
