= Institute of Public Enterprise =

Indian research institute

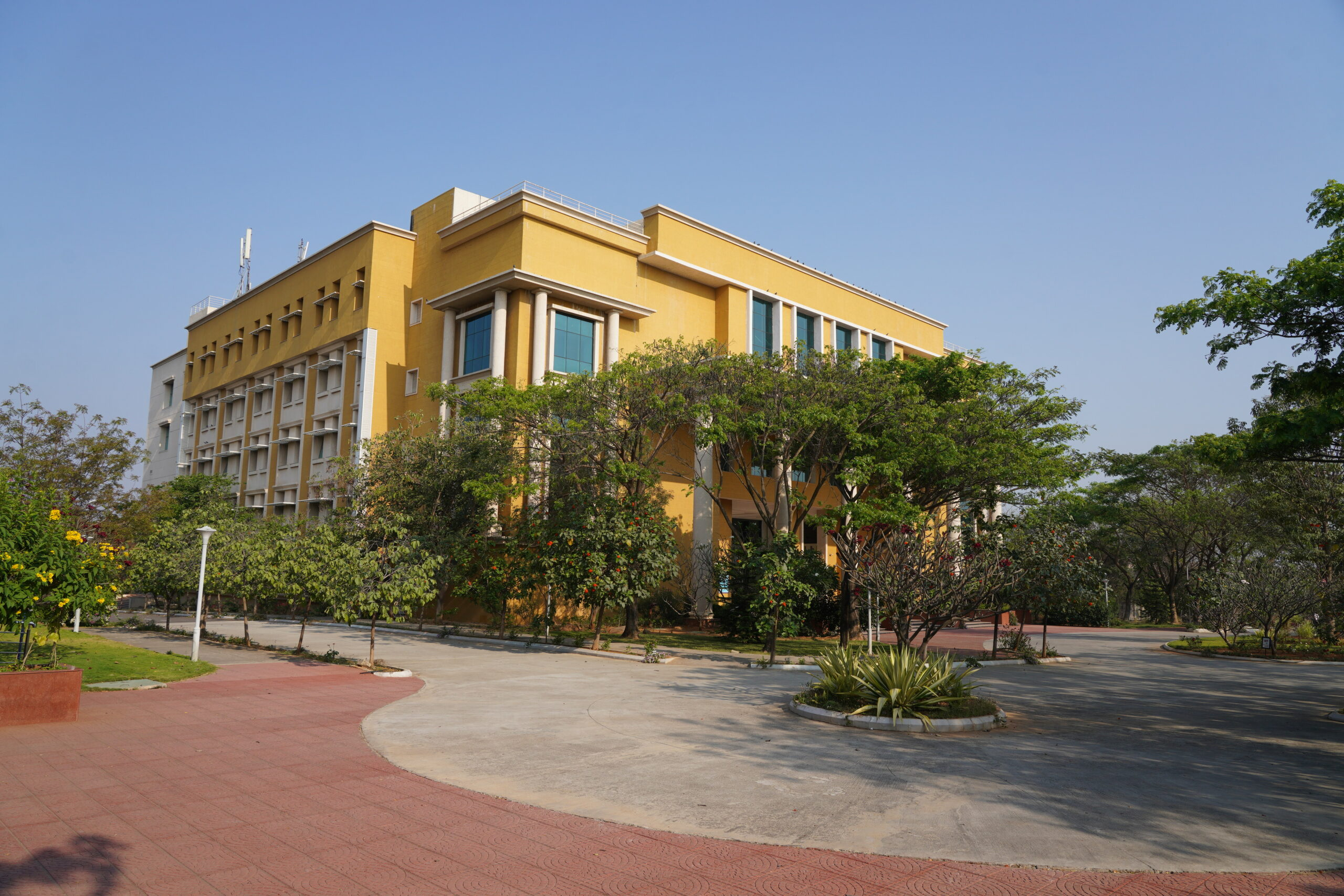
- Established: 1964
- Location: Shamirpet, Hyderabad, Telangana, India
- Website: www.ipeindia.org

The Institute of Public Enterprise (IPE) was established in 1964 for the study of issues and policies relating to public enterprise (PEs). S S Khera, ICS, the Cabinet Secretary, Government of India, had conceived the idea of a research institution that would undertake a systematic and sustained study of issues relevant to the formulation of policies towards public enterprises. In the early sixties, when PEs were designed as the principal instrument to serve the social and economic objectives of development, Khera felt a need for an institute that would collect information on PEs, study issues, and undertake consultancy and training for PEs.

V.V. Ramanadham, professor and head of the Department of Commerce, Osmania University, translated Khera's concept into IPE, with support and guidance from D. S Reddy, Vice-Chancellor, Osmania University as an autonomous, non-profit society.

Management education started in 1980 with the start of a three-year part-time MBA(PE) programme. In 1995, the institute started a two-year full-time Post Graduate Diploma in Business Management (PGDBM). Currently, the institute offers various 2 year PGP courses, namely Post Graduation Diploma in Management(PGDM), PGDM – Marketing, PGDM – Banking, Insurance & Finance, PGDM – Human Resource Management, and PGDM – International Business, the courses are recognised by AICTE

== Recognition ==
The Indian Council of Social Science Research (ICSSR) has recognised IPE as a "Centre of Excellence" in management sciences for doctoral studies. Seven universities have recognised the institute for the guidance of Ph.D. students in the field of Commerce, Economics, Management & Public Administration. IPE is a training centre for the IAS and other senior officers of central and state governments, public sector enterprises, and the private corporate sector.

== Awards ==
1.has been awarded for its outstanding partnership in the delivery of the IICA Certificate Programme (ICP) in CSR by the Indian Institute of Corporate Affairs, IICA, Manesar Gurgaon.

2.Institute of Public Enterprise (IPE) has been awarded the Five Star category recognition by Green Rating for Integrated Habitat Assessment (GRIHA) in its convention in February 2016, in New Delhi.

== See also ==
- List of business schools in Hyderabad, India
