= Jamiat Ul Mominat =

Islamic seminary in Hyderabad, India

Coordinates: 17.35595°N 78.47502°E

- Hyderabad, Telangana, 500002; India

Information
- Type: Islamic Female Seminary
- Established: 1991; 35 years ago
- Principal: Rizwana Zareen
- Language: English and Urdu
- Website: www.jamiatulmominath.com

Jamiat ul Mominat is an Islamic female seminary marriage counseling center, located in Hyderabad, India. It provides education to girls only. It has a Darul Ifta—(a department of legal ruling under Islamic jurisdiction) or generally collegium of muftis—where the girls are trained to become muftis. The panel has been called as one of the earliest in the world and particularly among Indian Muslims. The seminary offers courses such as; Alima is equivalent to Higher Secondary School Certificate and Fazila is equivalent to Bachelor's degree and are recognized by most of the universities across India.

== History ==
Earlier in the 19th century, religious education in Hyderabad was patronized by the Nizams and his aristocrats, both genders were equally encouraged for education. Local mosques were the center of primary Islamic education, from where pupils move to the Khanqahs and madrasas to obtain the theological education and were awarded with degrees of Alim, Fazil, Hafiz, Qazi and Mufti. Though girls were encouraged for Modern and Islamic higher education but the post of Qazi and Mufti were limited to males.

Established in 1991, the Jamiat ul Mominat had introduced an academic course of Mufti for girls as Muftia, and established a women only panel (Darul Ifta). As per the Islamic academic experts it is the first of its kind in India and the Muslim world. Particularly in Hyderabad Muslim women have had to rely on male Mufti for official religious guidance on gender-sensitive matters. The newly established women panel (muftias) provides a legal ruling on a point of Islamic law (sharia). As of 2020, the madrassa has produced 318 muftias and 15 girls are currently enrolled for the course of Muftia.

== Syllabus ==
Along with Islamic studies, the madrasa follows Telangana Secondary School Certificate syllabus and it is designed to cater both employment oriented and ensure the educational and religious upliftment of Indian Muslim women in general. As of 2020, the madrassa has 2,500 female students of which 400 are hosteller.

Courses taught at "Jamiat ul Mominat" such as Alima is equivalent to Higher Secondary School Certificate and Fazila is equivalent to Bachelor's degree and are recognized by most of the Indian universities, of which some are Aligarh Muslim University, Maulana Azad National Urdu University, Jamia Millia Islamia and Khwaja Moinuddin Chishti Language University

== Campus ==
The seminary is located in Moghalpura a suburb of Hyderabad, India. Apart from college building it consists of a library, research centre, a computer lab and a chamber for women panel to conduct meetings with visitors.

== Other activities ==
Apart from education the madrasa conducts regular public seminars for women. In 2016 a seminar was conducted at Salarjung Museum on "Muslim woman and Indian Culture" chaired by Michael Mullins, Consul General of United States to Hyderabad, India and Deputy Chief Minister of Telangana M. Mahmood Ali. It also participates in reforms and current affairs of Indian Muslims and kept its opinion in the matters such as Triple talaq in India ruling of 2017 and Right of Children to Free and Compulsory Education Act (RTE) of 2018.
