= Besant C. Raj =

Indian management and financial consultant (1933–2018)

- Born: 5 February 1933; Coimbatore, Tamil Nadu, India
- Died: 12 March 2018 (aged 85); Chennai, Tamil Nadu, India
- Education: MBA, PhD
- Occupations: Consultant, author
- Spouse: Amirtha Besant Raj

Besant C. Raj (5 February 1933 – 12 March 2018) was an Indian management and financial consultant. He was a founding member of ICFAI University. He was an advisor to many government and non-government organizations in the state of Chennai, Mumbai, Kerala and Andhra Pradesh, India. He was closely associated with several educational institutions like the Jawaharlal Nehru Institute of Development Banking of IDBI and was the chancellor of the ICFAI University, Dehradun, Uttaranchal.

== Education ==
He holds a doctoral degree in business administration, specializing in financial management from the Harvard Business School. He was an MBA from the Indian Institute of Management Ahmedabad (first batch) and had a master's degree in philosophy from Madras University and a master's degree in psychology from Banaras Hindu University.

== Publications ==
- Public Enterprise Investment Decisions in India: A Managerial Analysis, Macmillan 1977.
- Corporate Financial Management: An Introduction, Tata McGraw Hill publishing company Ltd., 1978.
- Unravelling the China Miracle-A comparative study with India (1950–2005), Book Surge Publishing-an Amazon.com Company, USA, 2006.
