= N. J. Yasaswy =

Indian writer

- Born: 9 February 1950; Andhra Pradesh, India
- Died: 8 October 2011 (aged 61); Hyderabad, Andhra Pradesh (present day Telangana), India
- Education: Institute of Cost Accountants of India; Institute of Chartered Accountants of India

N. J. Yasaswy (9 February 1950 – 8 October 2011) was an Indian finance and investment writer and a founding member of the Institute of Chartered Financial Analysts of India.

== Biography ==
Yasaswy was appointed by the Government of Andhra Pradesh as Chairman, Andhra Pradesh State Trading Corporation (1985–88) and Vice-Chairman, Public Enterprises Management Board (1986–88). He was a member of the SEBI Committee on Accounting Standards. He was a Member of the Board of Directors of the Association of Certified International Investment Analysts (ACIIA), Switzerland. Yasaswy annually offered post-Budget analysis sessions. He was nominated to be a member on SEBI Committee on Accounting Standards. Yasaswy was a member of the Board of Governors of the ICFAI University. He authored books on finance and investments.

He died on October 8, 2011, of a brain haemorrhage. He was survived by his wife, a son and a daughter and mother.

== Awards ==
He received the Basu Foundation Award and won Student of the Year from both the Institute of Cost and Works Accountants of India (in 1972) and the Institute of Chartered Accountants of India (in 1973).

== Books ==
- Finance and Profits - Vision Books
- Intelligent Stock Market Investing - Vision Books
- Personal Investment and Tax Planning - Vision Books
