= Institute of Chartered Financial Analysts of India =

Non-profit educational society in India

Institute of Chartered Financial Analysts of India, Sikkim
- Other name: ICFAI Sikkim
- Type: Accounting and Auditing Regulatory Body
- Established: 1984; 42 years ago
- Founders: N. J. Yasaswy; Besant C. Raj
- Chancellor: O. R. S. Rao
- Vice-Chancellor: Dr. Jagannath Patnaik
- Visitor: Governor of Sikkim
- Location: Gangtok, Sikkim, India
- Language: English, Hindi
- Website: www.icfai.org

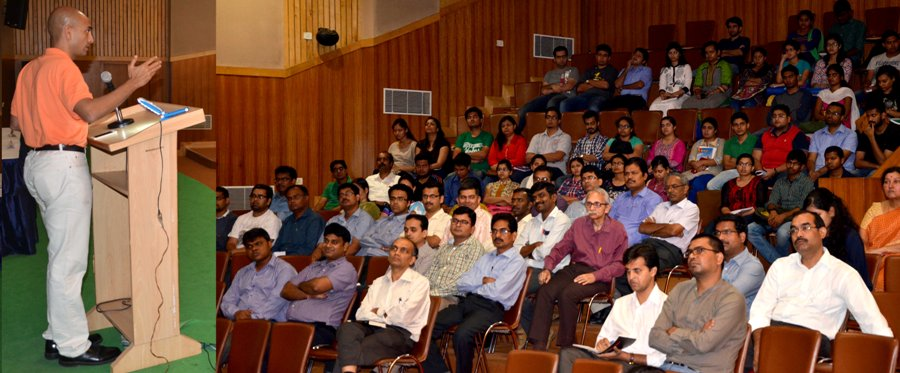
Atul Singh addressing a gathering at ICFAI

The Institute of Chartered Financial Analysts of India (ICFAI) was established in 1984 as a non-profit educational society in Hyderabad, Telangana, India. The institution has been offering education to students across India through its various programs in the field of higher education. The institution was founded by N. J. Yasaswy, Besant C. Raj and Dr. Prasanna Chandra, the Director of Centre for Financial Management.

The institute has a national presence with the sponsoring and establishment of eleven universities across India. Ten of these eleven universities have been established in the states of Uttarakhand, Tripura, Jharkhand, Mizoram, Nagaland, Sikkim (ICFAI Sikkim provides Financial Analyst through correspondence mode as well), West Bengal, Meghalaya, Chhattisgarh, Rajasthan and Himachal Pradesh through acts passed by the legislative assemblies of the respective states. The eleventh university, namely the ICFAI Foundation for Higher Education (IFHE), has been declared as a deemed-to-be University under Section 3 of the UGC Act, 1956. A few more university applications are at an advanced stage of processing by the respective state governments.

== Pedagogy ==
The case study method is a key component of the academic program at IBS, which is one of the few institutions in India that has made case studies a critical component of its curriculum. Almost all the courses at IBS are taught 100% through case studies - the case studies being tailor-made to the requirements of different subject areas and topics. Student evaluation is based on class participation and written reports. Students are encouraged to analyse the issues in-depth by gathering supporting information - either through published sources or by directly interacting with the companies involved.IBS Hyderabad gives special emphasis on the case based pedagogy and teachers pitch in as facilitators of class-room discussion.

== Indian CFA ==
The Indian CFA is a Charter awarded to candidates completing the Master in Investment and Financial Analysis at the university; the program is focused on financial analysis as applicable to investment management. See next section.

== Trademark disputes CFAI vs ICFAI ==
=== History of the dispute ===
The Chartered Financial Analyst (CFA) program was first delivered through AIMR (today's CFA Institute) in the USA, and later in India with the partnership of the then Institute of Certified Financial Analysts of India (ICFAI). Note that ICFAI is not affiliated with the CFA Institute and both the institutes have broken their partnership and are running their courses separately.

There was a long pending trademark dispute between CFA Institute, USA & ICFAI over the use of the CFA Designation. On 25 May 2012, both the parties decided to resolve this long pending dispute and have entered into an agreement under which ICFAI will stop providing the CFA Charter.

This will allow both the parties to mutually co-exist and pursue their business objectives. ICFAI would continue to operate under the ICFAI brand but will begin phasing out the CFA designation over the next few years. The Candidates who have already been awarded the CFA Charter have been requested by ICFAI to use "CFA (ICFAI)" to help distinguish themselves from the CFA Institute Charter holders.

=== ICFAI vs ICAI ===
In August 1989, the Institute of Chartered Accountants of India (ICAI), the national statutory body for professional accounting, imposed restrictions on its members on the use of the designation of `CFA' awarded by the Institute of Chartered Financial Analysts of India (ICFAI). The ICAI notification issued on August 3, 1989 says that "if any member of ICAI, i.e. any Chartered Accountant, who obtained the qualification of Chartered Financial Analyst [awarded by ICFAI] on or after January 1, 1990, or has obtained the said qualification earlier did not surrender the same before the said date, [he/she] would be held guilty of professional misconduct under the provisions of the Chartered Accountants (CA) Act."

The ICFAI and others filed petitions in the Andhra Pradesh High Court challenging the notification. A single judge and a Division Bench dismissed them. ICFAI appealed the notification, contending that it was violative of a person's fundamental right to practise any profession guaranteed under Article 19 (1) (g) of the Constitution. On May 16, 2007 the above notification was quashed by Supreme Court of India, and the ICAI was barred from applying the aforementioned prohibitions on its members.

=== Future of ICFAI and CFA ===
Following a legal dispute with the CFA Institute, ICFAI shifted focus to developing private universities, some of which hold AICTE and UGC recognition. ICFAI reduced emphasis on developing statutory recognition for its CFA charter which governing member N. J. Yasaswy had stated was intended to position the program above the CA exam and instead expanded non-CFA programs, including MBA degrees, ICFAI Business Schools (IBS), and post-graduate programs. It also established schools offering undergraduate programs and degrees. Indian CFAs fulfill qualification requirements but primarily target niche finance roles, whereas CAs hold traditional statutory roles in auditing and taxation.

CFAs work in investment related and finance fields where MBAs (some from ICFAI itself), CAs, Master's degree holders of Statistics, Economics, Doctorates etc. hold top posts. ICFAI though has safeguarded its CFA charter in India with valid state legislature under IUT Tripura Act, but CFA charterholders are not mandatorily employable and currently don't perform any statutory duty unlike CAs, CSs, CMAs, though CCFA tried to accomplish this in investment related areas in India by submitting a draft bill to the Ministry of Finance for consideration which was rejected due to various legal disputes that ICFAI faces. Also here is a fact to note that ICFAI University Tripura has never been permitted to conduct any distance learning/correspondence course by UGC. CFAs are employed only because of their course contents and rigor of the CFA program, which is the only reason they have got market acceptance with very few qualifying as CFAs every year. ICFAI has very few CFA charter holders, compared to other professionals and hence they don't have a large and established presence in the Indian job market. Indian companies have tied up with other Indian bodies like AMFI or NSE in offering investment designations and courses.As per information on ICFAI Tripura website this has DEC Approval and Recognition of Directorate of Distance Education, The Institute of Chartered Financial Analysts of India University, Tripura, by the Distance Education Council "Distance Education Council (DEC) Vide their letter No.DEC/Recog/2010/277 dated August 04,2010 has accorded recognition to the Directorate of Distance Education, The Icfai University, Tripura and its programs after inspection by an expert joint committee consisting of UGC, AICTE and DEC nominees. " Frequent changes to eligibility requirements changes in fee structure, exorbitant council membership charges etc., have caused confusion among the student community. Many founding members have left ICFAI as they were not happy with the way ICFAI treated its flagship course. The course, which was once a stepping stone for Indians into analytic finance has become just one more obscure degree due to continuous changes in the curriculum. As a result, there is negativity about this course in the Indian corporate world. Keeping in view the demands from the corporate world and impending competition, ICFAI is thinking of bringing wholesale changes in the curriculum and the training method from the current academic year. The new course can only be completed in 24 months and will include a training program for the passing students of final exam. ICFAI is also creating a window for students of CFA program to undergo 2 months internship with its in-house concerns to impart rigorous analytical skills. Exemption for MBAs will be stopped from the current academic year. Also, ICFAI is drafting a continuing professional development module which will be compulsory for all the current CFAs. This program will enable the current CFAs to enhance their knowledge in their respective areas and will include relevant statutes changes, paradigm shift in capital markets and allied subject matter. ICFAI hopes to regain the old status of its CFA program through continuously evolving methods, the most recent is focussing on the core aspects of investment management and financial analysis in its MFA degree(current CFA syllabus) and increasing CFA charter membership by giving official charters to students who have cleared the core subjects of investment management and financial analysis of the previous(CFA curriculum) MS Finance program.
