= Rapport =

Close and harmonious relationship

Rapport (/rəˈpɔːr/ rə-POR; French: [ʁapɔʁ]) is a close and harmonious relationship in which the people or groups concerned are "in sync" with each other, understand each other's feelings or ideas, and communicate smoothly.

The word derives from the French verb rapporter which means literally to carry something back (in the sense of how people relate to each other: what one person sends out the other sends back). For example, people with rapport may realize that they share similar values, beliefs, knowledge, or behaviors around politics, music, or sports. This may also mean that they engage in reciprocal behaviors such as posture mirroring or increased coordination in their verbal and nonverbal interactions.

Rapport has been shown to have benefits for psychotherapy and medicine, negotiation, education, and tourism, among others. In each of these cases, the rapport between members of a dyad (e.g. a teacher and student or doctor and patient) allows the participants to coordinate their actions and establish a mutually beneficial working relationship, or what is often called a "working alliance". In consumer-oriented guided group activities (e.g., a cooking class, a wine tour, and hiking group), rapport is not only dyadic and customer-employee oriented, but also customer-customer and group-oriented as customers consume and interact with each other in a group for an extended period.

== Building rapport ==
There are a number of techniques that are supposed to be beneficial in building rapport. These include matching body language (i.e., posture, gesture, etc.); indicating attentiveness through maintaining eye contact; and matching tempo, terminology, and breathing rhythm. In conversation, some verbal behaviors associated with increased rapport are the use of positivity (or, positive "face management"), sharing personal information of gradually increasing intimacy (or, "self-disclosure"), and reference to shared interests or experiences.

Building rapport can improve community-based research tactics, assist in finding a partner, improve student-teacher relationships, and allow employers to gain trust in employees.

Building rapport takes time. Extroverts tend to have an easier time building rapport than introverts. Extraversion accelerates the process due to an increase in confidence and skillfulness in social settings.

=== Methods ===
==== Coordination ====
Coordination, also called "mirroring" means getting into rhythm with another person, or resembling their verbal or nonverbal behaviors:

Emotional mirroring
Empathizing with someone's emotional state by being on 'their side'. One listens for key words and problems so one can address and question them to better one's understanding of what the other person is saying and demonstrate empathy towards them.
Posture mirroring
Matching the tone of a person's body language not through direct imitation (as this can appear as mockery) but through mirroring the general message of their posture and energy.
Tone and tempo mirroring
Matching the tone, tempo, inflection, and volume of another person's voice.

==== Mutual attentiveness ====
Another way to build rapport is for each partner to indicate their attentiveness to the other. This attentiveness may take the form of nonverbal attentiveness, such as looking at the other person, nodding at appropriate moments, or physical proximity, as seen in work on teachers' "immediacy" behaviors in the classroom. Attentiveness might also be demonstrated through reciprocation of nonverbal behaviors like smiling or nodding, in a similar way to the coordination technique, or in the reciprocal sharing of personal details about the other person that signal one's knowledge and attentiveness to their needs.

==== Commonality ====
Commonality is the technique of deliberately finding something in common with a person in order to build a sense of camaraderie and trust. This is done through references to shared interests, dislikes, and experiences. By sharing personal details or self-disclosing personal preferences or information, interlocutors can build commonality, and thus increase rapport.

==== Face management ====
Another way to build rapport is through "positive face management", (or, more simply: positivity). According to some psychologists, we have a need to be seen in a positive light, known as our "face". By managing each other's "face", boosting it when necessary, or reducing negative impacts to it, we build rapport with others.

== Maintaining rapport ==
In addition to building rapport, it is important to pay attention to the factors that can undermine rapport. Drawing on Spencer-Oatey's earlier work on rapport management, she and Lazidou identify six factors or sensitivities that interlocutors need to take into account in order to avoid undermining rapport. Using the acronym GAAFFE, they call these the GAAFFE Triggers:

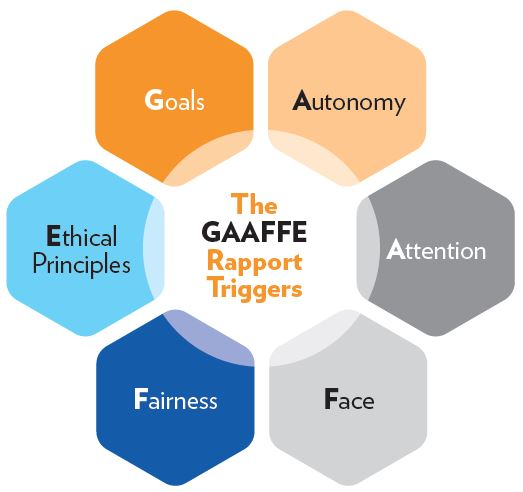
Rapport triggers

- Goals: What each person wants to achieve.
- Autonomy: The level of autonomy or direction that each person feels comfortable with.
- Attention: The level of attention or connection that each person feels comfortable with.
- Face: The respect and appreciation that each person wants to be shown.
- Fairness: The fair treatment that each person wants to experience.
- Ethical Principles: The upholding of ethical standards of behaviour.

The authors maintain that if there is a mismatch between the interlocutors in their interpretations or prioritisation of any of these triggers, rapport will be affected and typically undermined. This will lead to some kind of rapport reaction – an emotional reaction and/or an evaluative reaction.

== Benefits ==
A number of benefits from building interpersonal rapport have been proposed, all of which concern smoother interactions, improved collaboration, and improved interpersonal outcomes, though the specifics differ by the domain. These domains include but are not limited to healthcare, education, business, and social relationships.

In the health domain, provider-patient rapport is often called the "therapeutic alliance" or "therapeutic relationship"—the collaboration quality between provider and patient—which can predict therapy outcomes or patients' treatment adherence.

In education, teacher-student rapport is predictive of students' participation in the course, their course retention, their likelihood to take a course in that domain again, and has sometimes been used to predict course outcomes. Some have argued that teacher-student rapport is an essential element of what makes an effective teacher, or the ability to manage interpersonal relationships and build a positive, pro-social, atmosphere of trust and reduced anxiety. Student-student rapport, on the other hand, while largely out of the teacher's ability to control, is also predictive of reduced anxiety in the course, feelings of a supportive class culture, and improved participation in class discussions. In these relationships, intentionally building rapport through individual meetings has shown an increase in student engagement and level of comfort in the classroom.

In negotiation, rapport is beneficial for reaching mutually beneficial outcomes, as partners are more likely to trust each other and be willing to cooperate and reach a positive outcome. However, interpersonal rapport in negotiation can lead to unethical behavior, particularly in impasse situations, where the interpersonal rapport may influence the negotiators to behave unethically.

In terms of social relationships such as friendship and romantic relationships, establishing rapport can build trust, increase feelings of closeness, and eliminate certain misunderstandings. Rapport is necessary in establishing satisfaction and understanding acceptable behaviors in an interpersonal relationship. Friendships and romantic relationships can overlap with other domains.

== The study of rapport ==
To better study how rapport can lead to the above benefits, researchers generally adopt one of three main approaches: self-report surveys given to the participants, third-party observations from a naive observer, and some form of automated computational detection, using computer vision and machine learning.

Self-report surveys typically consist of a set of questions given at the end of an interpersonal interaction, asking the participants to reflect on their relationship with another person and rate various aspects of that relationship, typically on a Likert scale. Though this is the most common approach, it suffers from unreliability of self-report data, such as the issue of separating participants' reflection on a single interaction with their relationship with the other person more broadly.

A third-party observer can give a rapport rating to a particular segment (often called a "slice") of such an interaction. Other recent work uses techniques from computer vision, machine learning, and artificial intelligence to computationally detect the level of rapport between members of a dyad.

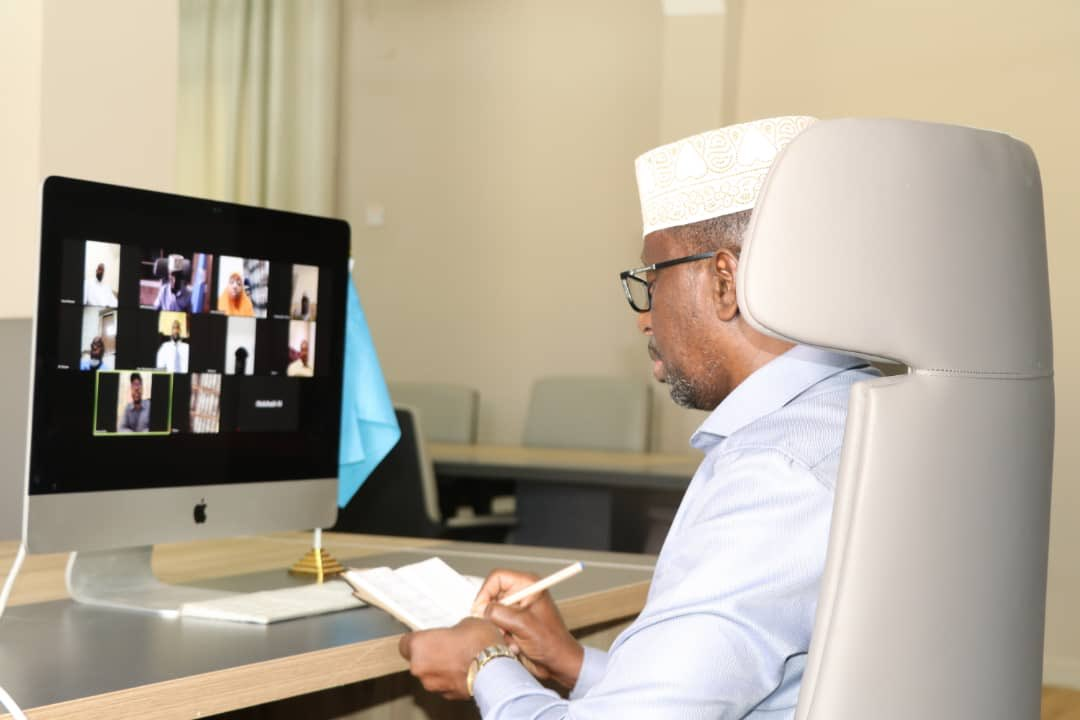
Man holds video conference

=== Rapport and Technology ===
In the 21st century, online communication has had a huge impact on how business is conducted and how relationships are formed. In the era of Covid-19 and the shift to remote work and schooling, the way in which rapport is built has evolved. Communicating solely through online channels challenges rapport building. Challenges include technical difficulties interrupting video calls and direct messaging, interruptions and distractions from the user's home, a lack of intimacy and the ability to observe one another, lack of eye contact, mundane interactions, and the "pressure of presence".

=== Rapport in Business ===
In 2000, Professors Gremler and Gwinner proposed rapport as a central construct in understanding customer-employee relationships in service businesses characterized by a high amount of interpersonal interactions. They defined rapport as "...a customer's perception of having an enjoyable interaction with a service provider employee, characterized by personal connection between the two interactants." The research showed that rapport positively impacts customer satisfaction, loyalty intent, and word-of-mouth communication.

== See also ==
- Empathy – Ability to understand or feel what another is feeling
- Facial resemblance
- Grok – Neologism coined by Robert Heinlein
- Mirroring – Subconscious imitative behaviour
- Customer intimacy – Non-fiction book about business
