= Interpersonal circumplex =

Model of personality and behavior

The Interpersonal Circumplex is a taxonomy of interpersonal personality traits and behaviours. The circumplex consists of orthogonal dimensions and concentric circles indicating the level of intensity.

The interpersonal circle or interpersonal circumplex is a model for conceptualizing, organizing, and assessing interpersonal behavior, traits, and motives. The interpersonal circumplex is defined by two orthogonal axes: a vertical axis (of status, dominance, power, ambitiousness, assertiveness, or control) and a horizontal axis (of agreeableness, compassion, nurturant, solidarity, friendliness, warmth, affiliation or love). In recent years, it has become conventional to identify the vertical and horizontal axes with the broad constructs of agency and communion. Thus, each point in the interpersonal circumplex space can be specified as a weighted combination of agency and communion.

== Character traits ==
Placing a person near one of the poles of the axes implies that the person tends to convey clear or strong messages (of warmth, hostility, dominance or submissiveness). Conversely, placing a person at the midpoint of the agentic dimension implies the person conveys neither dominance nor submissiveness (and pulls neither dominance nor submissiveness from others). Likewise, placing a person at the midpoint of the communal dimension implies the person conveys neither warmth nor hostility (and pulls neither warmth nor hostility from others).

The interpersonal circumplex can be divided into broad segments (such as fourths) or narrow segments (such as sixteenths), but currently most interpersonal circumplex inventories partition the circle into eight octants. As one moves around the circle, each octant reflects a progressive blend of the two axial dimensions.

There exist a variety of psychological tests designed to measure these eight interpersonal circumplex octants. For example, the Interpersonal Adjective Scales (IAS; Wiggins, 1995) is a measure of interpersonal traits associated with each octant of the interpersonal circumplex. The Inventory of Interpersonal Problems (IIP; Horowitz, Alden, Wiggins, & Pincus, 2000) is a measure of problems associated with each octant of the interpersonal circumplex, whereas the Inventory of Interpersonal Strengths (IIS; Hatcher & Rogers, 2009) is a measure of strengths associated with each octant. The Circumplex Scales of Interpersonal Values (CSIV; Locke, 2000) is a 64-item measure of the value individuals place on interpersonal experiences associated with each octant of the interpersonal circumplex. The Person's Relating to Others Questionnaire (PROQ), the latest version being the PROQ3 is a 48-item measure developed by the British doctor John Birtchnell. Finally, the Impact Message Inventory-Circumplex (IMI; Kiesler, Schmidt, & Wagner, 1997) assesses the interpersonal dispositions of a target person, not by asking the target person directly, but by assessing the feelings, thoughts, and behaviors that the target evokes in another person. Since interpersonal dispositions are key features of most personality disorders, interpersonal circumplex measures can be useful tools for identifying or differentiating personality disorders (Kiesler, 1996; Leary, 1957; Locke, 2006).

== Applications to rapport ==
Birtchnell argued that each end of the two axes of the interpersonal circumplex can be manifested as either positive and adaptive interpersonal behaviour or as negative and maladaptive interpersonal behaviour. Working in psychotherapy, he explored whether negative/maladaptive behaviour could be reduced over time through therapy. Laurence Alison, Emily Alison and colleagues have applied the same principle to interrogative interviewing and linked it to the notion of rapport. They propose that when interviewing terrorist suspects, interviewers who use positive/adaptive behaviours in a versatile manner will foster greater rapport with their suspects and will in turn be able to elicit enhanced information intelligence and evidence from them. They developed the ORBIT (Observing Rapport-Based Interpersonal Techniques) coding system to measure this.

Alison and Alison have also applied the interpersonal circumplex, with its adaptive and maladaptive traits, to building rapport in everyday interaction, such as between parents and children and between work colleagues. They call the circumplex the Animal Circle and use animals to represent the ends of the two axes: Good/bad Lion = High control; Good/bad Mouse = Low control; Good/bad Monkey = High agreeableness; Good/bad T-Rex = Low agreeableness. Again, they argue for the importance of adaptive behaviour and of versatility in moving along and across the two axes in order to build and maintain rapport.

Helen Spencer-Oatey and her colleagues have applied the same principles to leadership. They call the interpersonal circumplex the Interaction Compass, arguing that it is helpful for guiding leadership behaviour in contexts of global diversity, where versatility and flexing are crucial for maintaining positive relationships with subordinates. Spencer-Oatey and Lazidou also apply it to a range of workplace relationships and issues in their TRIPS rapport management model. TRIPS is an acronym, with T standing for Triggers – sensitivities that can enhance or undermine rapport. The two axes of the interpersonal circumplex are identified as two of the rapport Triggers.

== History ==
Originally coined Leary Circumplex or Leary Circle after Timothy Leary is defined as "a two-dimensional representation of personality organized around two major axes".

In the 20th century, there were a number of efforts by personality psychologists to create comprehensive taxonomies to describe the most important and fundamental traits of human nature. Leary would later become famous for his controversial LSD experiments at Harvard. His circumplex, developed in 1957, is a circular continuum of personality formed from the intersection of two base axes: Power and Love. The opposing sides of the power axis are dominance and submission, while the opposing sides of the love axis are love and hate (Wiggins, 1996).

Leary argued that all other dimensions of personality can be viewed as a blending of these two axes. For example, a person who is stubborn and inflexible in their personal relationships might graph her personality somewhere on the arc between dominance and love. However, a person who exhibits passive–aggressive tendencies might find herself best described on the arc between submission and hate. The main idea of the Leary Circumplex is that each and every human trait can be mapped as a vector coordinate within this circle.

Furthermore, the Leary Circumplex also represents a kind of bull's eye of healthy psychological adjustment. Theoretically speaking, the most well-adjusted person of the planet could have their personality mapped at the exact center of the circumplex, right at the intersection of the two axes, while individuals exhibiting extremes in personality would be located on the circumference of the circle.

The Leary Circumplex offers three major benefits as a taxonomy. It offers a map of interpersonal traits within a geometric circle. It allows for comparison of different traits within the system. It provides a scale of healthy and unhealthy expressions of each trait.

== See also ==
- Circumplex model of group tasks
- Interpersonal reflex
- Lorna Smith Benjamin – creator of the similar Structural Analysis of Social Behavior (SASB) circumplex model
- Personality psychology
- Unmitigated communion
