= Resemblance =

Resemblance may refer to:

- Similarity (philosophy), or resemblance, a relation between objects that constitutes how much these objects are alike
- Family resemblance (anthropology), physical similarities shared between close relatives
- Family resemblance, a philosophical idea made popular by Ludwig Wittgenstein
- Resemblance (fiqh), or imitation (tashabbuh), where a Muslim might resemble certain non-believers or sinners

== See also ==
- Facial resemblance, observed to enhance trustworthiness
- Resemblance nominalism, in metaphysics
- No Resemblance Whatsoever, a 1995 album by Dan Fogelberg and Tim Weisberg
- w-shingling, a technique to ascertain the similarity between documents
