= Masters' Union University =

Private university in Gurugram, Haryana, India

- Type: Private university
- Established: 2020
- Founder: Pratham Mittal
- Affiliations: AACSB; EFMD Global
- Chairperson: Manoj Kohli
- Academic staff: 200+ industry professionals
- Students: ~233 (PGP-TBM 2025 cohort); ~250 (PGP intake 2026–27)
- Location: Gurugram, Haryana, India
- Campus: DLF Cyber Park (2020); Cyberwalk (2026)
- Colours
- Website: mastersunion.org

Masters' Union University is a private university in Gurugram, Haryana, India. It was founded in 2020 as Masters' Union by Pratham Mittal. The university offers undergraduate, postgraduate, and executive programmes in business and technology.

In September 2026, the Haryana Legislative Assembly passed the Haryana Private Universities (Amendment) Bill, 2026, which provides for the establishment of Masters' Union University in Gurugram under the Haryana Private Universities Act, 2006. It holds institutional membership with the Association to Advance Collegiate Schools of Business (AACSB) and EFMD Global, and has received Business School Impact System (BSIS) recognition from EFMD Global.

== History ==
Masters' Union University was established in 2020. Its founding board included Arun Maira, former chair of BCG; Mukund Rajan, former managing director of Tata Teleservices Limited; Karthik Ramanna, a director at the University of Oxford; Narendra Jadhav, a member of parliament and former chief economist of the RBI; Bhaskar Chakravorti, a former professor at HBS and former partner at McK; and Satish Krishnan, former managing director of financial markets at Standard Chartered Bank.

In April 2023, the university appointed Manoj Kohli as chairperson of the board of governors. Kohli had previously been chief executive officer and managing director of Bharti Airtel and as country head of SoftBank India.

The school has held five convocation ceremonies. Chief guests have included Nithin Kamath, Sanjeev Bikhchandani, Peyush Bansal, Jagdeep Dhankhar, Vice President of India, and Rohit Sharma, captain of the India national cricket team.

In January 2026, the Government of Haryana issued a Letter of Intent to Masters' Union to pursue a transition to becoming a state private university under the Haryana Private Universities Act. During the same month, the university announced plans for a new 10-acre campus in Gurugram, to be located within a 150-acre business district near the offices Nestlé, Maruti Suzuki, Bharti Airtel, Honda, Mitsubishi, and HCL Technologies.

== Academics ==
=== Accreditation ===
The university holds institutional membership with EFMD Global, the Association to Advance Collegiate Schools of Business, and the Business Graduates Association. It has received Business School Impact System (BSIS) recognition from EFMD Global.

=== Programmes ===
The school offers four-year undergraduate programmes in Technology and Business Management, Psychology and Marketing, Data Science and Artificial Intelligence, and Finance and Economics. Students may pursue a 3+1 dual-degree pathway with the Illinois Institute of Technology or Griffith University.

The postgraduate offering includes the Post Graduate Programme in Technology and Business Management (PGP-TBM), a 16-month full-time programme. The school also offers postgraduate programmes in Human Resources and Organisation Strategy, Sports Management and Gaming, Applied AI and Agentic Systems, UI/UX and AI Product Design, and Sustainability and Business Management.

Executive programmes are offered under the PGP Rise umbrella, including General Management, Owners and Promoters Management, and a Global Track. The school offers a Bloomberg Equity Research Programme in partnership with Bloomberg.

== Collaborations and partnerships ==
Masters' Union has dual-degree arrangements with the Illinois Institute of Technology in Chicago and Griffith University in Australia for undergraduate programmes.

The school offers immersion programmes with INSEAD, SDA Bocconi, National University of Singapore, Babson College, IÉSEG School of Management, and Columbia Business School.

PwC India worked on curriculum design for artificial intelligence programmes and operates the GenAI Lab on campus. Krutrim designed the Data Science and Artificial Intelligence curriculum. Bloomberg offers an equity research programme. KPMG, Schbang, and Cars24 contribute to course delivery and live projects.

== Recognition ==
In 2025, Business World ranked the school fifth among top business schools for one-year programmes. In 2026, Outlook-ICARE ranked it fifth among emerging private business schools. In 2025, the school received a bronze award for innovation in business education at the QS Reimagine Education Awards.
