= Kevin P. Gwinner =

American social scientist, academic, and author

- Occupations: Social scientist, academic, and author

Academic background
- Education: B.S., M.B.A., Ph.D., Arizona State University
- Website: https://cba.k-state.edu/about/faculty-staff/directory/Gwinner-Kevin.html

Kevin P. Gwinner is an American social scientist, academic, and author. He is a professor of Marketing, and the Edgerley Family Dean of the College of Business Administration at Kansas State University.

Gwinner's research interests span the fields of marketing, especially marketing management, marketing strategy, services marketing, and sports marketing. His work has been cited over 38,000 times.

== Education ==
Gwinner completed his B.S. in 1988 and M.B.A. in 1992 from Arizona State University. Later in 1997, he obtained a Ph.D. from the same institution.

== Research ==
Gwinner's research focuses primarily on improving and managing the performance of front-line, customer-contact employees. Specifically, he is examining issues dealing with the interactions between front-line service employees and consumers. A secondary research interest focuses on sports marketing.

== Other notable academic roles ==
Gwinner is an editorial review board member of Journal of Marketing Education and served on the American Marketing Association service special interest group (SERVSIG) Best Service Article Award Committee for several years.

== Awards and honors ==
- 2005 – Winner of the Best Paper Award Journal of Service Research, volume 8: Kevin P. Gwinner, Mary Jo Bitner, Stephen W. Brown, and Ajith Kumar, "Service Customization Through Employee Adaptiveness" (November 2005)
- 2005 – The most influential article published in the Journal of the Academy of Marketing Science in the prior seven years
- 2002 - Winner of the Best Paper Award Journal of Service Research, volume 4: Hennig-Thurau, Thorsten, Kevin P. Gwinner, and Dwayne D. Gremler, "Understanding Relationship Marketing Outcomes: An Integration of Relational Benefits and Relationship Quality" (February 2002)

== Bibliography ==
=== Selected articles ===
- Gwinner, Kevin P.; Gremler, Dwayne D.; Bitner, Mary Jo (1998). "Relational Benefits in Services Industries: The Customer's Perspective". Journal of the Academy of Marketing Science. 26 (2): 101–114. doi:10.1177/0092070398262002.
- Gremler, Dwayne D.; Gwinner, Kevin P. (2000). "Customer-employee Rapport in Service Relationships". Journal of Service Research. 3 (1): 82–104. doi:10.1177/109467050031006.
