= Circumplex model of group tasks =

Circle with four quadrants representing goal-related activities done by groups of people

The circumplex model of group tasks is a circle with four quadrants representing goal-related activities done by groups of people. The activities are: generating a task, choosing correct procedure, negotiating resolutions to conflicts, and executing the task.

== Overview ==
The circumplex model of group tasks was inspired by the circumplex model of emotions, a graphical representation of emotional states (see Emotion classification § Circumplex model) that is usually a circle with unpleasant on the left, pleasant on the right, activation on the top, and deactivation on the bottom. All the other emotions are placed around the circle as combinations of these four basic states. It is based on the theory that people experience emotions as overlapping and ambiguous.

Joseph E McGrath modified the circumplex model of emotions to include group dynamics, based on the work of Shaw, Carter, Hackman, Steiner, Shiflett, Taylor, Lorge, Davis, Laughlin, and others. McGrath used this model as a research tool to evaluate group task performance.

== Group dynamics ==
Group dynamics involve the influential actions, processes and changes that exist both within and between groups. Group dynamics also involve the scientific study of group processes. Through extensive research in the field of group dynamics, it is now well known that all groups, despite their innumerable differences, possess common properties and dynamics. Social psychological researchers have attempted to organize these commonalities, in order to further understand the genuine nature of group processes.

For instance, social psychological research indicates that there are numerous goal-related interactions and activities that groups of all sizes undertake. These interactions have been categorized by Robert F. Bales, who spent his entire life attempting to find an answer to the question, "What do people do when they are in groups?". To simplify the understanding of group interactions, Bales concluded that all interactions within groups could be categorized as either a relationship interaction (or socioemotional interaction) or a task interaction.

== Development ==
Just as Bales was determined to identify the basic types of interactions involved in groups, Joseph E. McGrath was determined to identify the various goal-related activities that are regularly displayed by groups. McGrath contributed greatly to the understanding of group dynamics through the development of his circumplex model of group tasks. As intended, McGrath's model effectively organizes all group-related activities by distinguishing between four basic group goals. These goals are referred to as the circumplex model of group task's four quadrants, which are categorized based on the dominant performance process involved in a group's task of interest.

=== Breakdown ===
The four quadrants are as follows:

1. Generating ideas or plans
2. Choosing a solution
3. Negotiating a solution to a conflict
4. Executing a task

To further differentiate the various goal-related group activities, McGrath further sub-divides these four categories, resulting in eight categories in total. The breakdown of these categories is as follows:

1. Generating ideas or plans

- Type 1: Planning tasks: e.g. Generating plans
- Type 2: Creativity tasks: e.g. Generating ideas

2. Choosing a solution

- Type 3: Intellective tasks: e.g. Solving problems with correct answers
- Type 4: Decision-making tasks: e.g. Deciding issues with no right answer

3. Negotiating a solution to a conflict

- Type 5: Cognitive conflict tasks: e.g. Resolving conflicts of viewpoints
- Type 6: Mixed-motive tasks: e.g. Resolving conflicts of interest

4. Executing a task

- Type 7: Contests/battles/competitive tasks: e.g. Resolving conflicts of power
- Type 8: Performance/psychomotor tasks: e.g. Executing performance tasks

=== Details ===
According to McGrath and Kravitz (1982), the four most commonly represented tasks in the group dynamics literature are intellective tasks, decision-making tasks, cognitive conflict tasks and mixed-motive tasks.

The circumplex model of group tasks takes the organization of goal-related activities a step further by distinguishing between tasks that involve cooperation between group members, cooperation tasks (Types 1, 2, 3 and 8) and tasks that often lead to conflict between group members, conflict tasks (Types 4, 5, 6 and 7). Additionally, McGrath's circumplex model of group tasks also distinguishes between tasks that require action (behavioural tasks) and tasks that require conceptual review (conceptual tasks). 'Behavioural tasks' include Types 1, 6, 7 and 8, while 'conceptual tasks' include Types 2, 3, 4 and 5.

== Visual representation ==
The circumplex model of group tasks is, evidently, a very detailed and complex model. To allow for a more thorough understanding of its properties, a visual representation of the model has been developed. (Need a diagram of the model)

== Further explanation ==
Since the circumplex model of group tasks is quite detailed and complex, numerous social psychological researchers have attempted to describe the model in various ways to ensure readers obtain an optimal understanding of the model. For instance, according to Straus and McGrath (1994), the four quadrants and the various task types with which they contain all relate to one another within a two-dimensional space. More specifically, Straus and McGrath (1994) state that the horizontal dimension of the circumplex model of group tasks reflects the extent to which a task entails cognitive versus behavioural performance requirements whereas the vertical dimension reflects the extent and form of interdependence among members.

== See also ==
- Interpersonal circumplex
