= Beth A. Walker =

American academic administrator and marketing scholar

Dean of the Colorado State University College of Business
- Incumbent
- Assumed office July 1, 2015
- Preceded by: Ajay Menon

Personal details
- Education: Virginia Tech (BA); Pennsylvania State University (MA, PhD)

Beth A. Walker is an American academic administrator and marketing scholar currently serving as the Dean of the Colorado State University College of Business since 2015. Before joining Colorado State University, Walker was a faculty member at the W. P. Carey School of Business at Arizona State University, where she also served as the Associate Dean for MBA Programs.

== Early life and education ==
Walker grew up in New Jersey. She completed her undergraduate studies at Virginia Tech and went on to receive both her master's and Ph.D. from Pennsylvania State University. Walker joined the Arizona State University faculty in 1988.

== Career ==
Walker's career at Arizona State University included roles such as chair of the marketing department, faculty director of the Evening MBA Program, and associate dean for MBA Programs. During her tenure, the ASU Evening MBA program achieved high national rankings.

In 2015, Walker was appointed Dean of the College of Business at Colorado State University.

She serves on the board of directors of the American Marketing Association as well as the Northern Colorado Better Business Bureau.

== Research ==
Walker is a researcher focusing on marketing strategy, customer portfolio management, and the social and cognitive processes underlying marketing strategy. She has received the Harold Maynard Award from the Journal of Marketing and the Richard Beckhard Prize from the MIT Sloan Management Review. Her research has been published in MIT Sloan Management Review, Psychology & Marketing and Journal of Business Research.

=== Selected publications ===
- Walker, B. A.; Olson, J. C. (1991). "Means-end chains: Connecting products with self". Journal of Business Research. 22 (2): 111–118. doi:10.1016/0148-2963(91)90045-Y.
- Hutt, M. D.; Stafford, E. R.; Walker, B. A.; Reingen, P. H. (2000). "Case study: defining the social network of a strategic alliance". MIT Sloan Management Review. 41 (2): 51.
- Rosenbaum, M. S.; Ward, J.; Walker, B. A.; Ostrom, A. L. (2007). "A cup of coffee with a dash of love: An investigation of commercial social support and third-place attachment". Journal of Service Research. 10 (1): 43–59. doi:10.1177/1094670507303011. S2CID 145582124.
- Noble, C. H.; Walker, B. A. (1997). <29::AID-MAR3>3.0.CO;2-Q "Exploring the relationships among liminal transitions, symbolic consumption, and the extended self". Psychology & Marketing. 14 (1): 29–47. doi:10.1002/(SICI)1520-6793(199701)14:1<29::AID-MAR3>3.0.CO;2-Q.
