= External memory =

The term external memory is used with different meanings in different fields:

- For the use of the term in psychology, see external memory (psychology)
- For the use of the term in computing, see auxiliary memory
- For the use of the term in computer science, see external memory algorithm
