= Journal of Service Research =

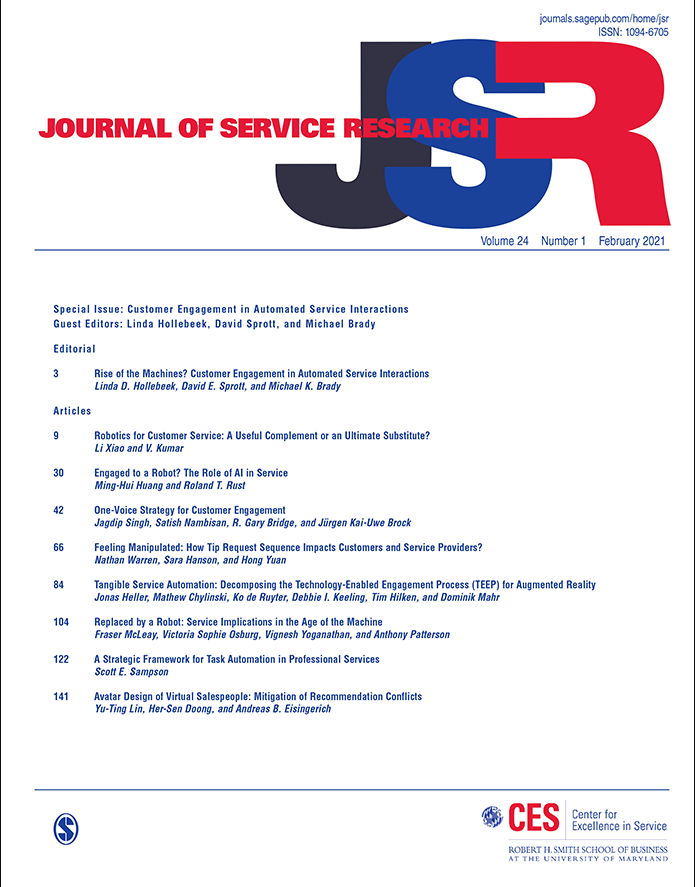
- Discipline: Business studies
- Language: English
- Edited by: Florian von Wangenheim

Publication details
- History: 1998-present
- Publisher: SAGE Publications
- Frequency: Quarterly
- Impact factor: 6.382 (2020)

Standard abbreviations
- ISO 4: J. Serv. Res.

Indexing
- ISSN: 1094-6705 (print); 1552-7379 (web)
- LCCN: 98660141
- OCLC no.: 37279531

Links
- Journal homepage; Online access; Online archive

The Journal of Service Research is a quarterly peer-reviewed academic journal that covers the field of business studies. The current editor-in-chief is Florian von Wangenheim (ETH Zurich). The journal was established by Roland Rust (University of Maryland) in 1998 and is published by SAGE Publications. The Journal of Service Research is sponsored by the Center for Excellence in Service at the University of Maryland's Robert H. Smith School of Business.

== Mission ==
The JSR states that its mission is "is to be the leading outlet for the most advanced research in service marketing, service operations, service human resources and organizational design, service information systems, customer satisfaction and service quality, electronic commerce, and the economics of service,"

== Scope ==
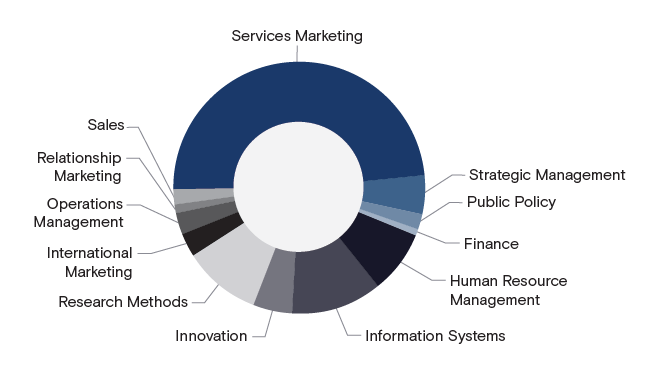
JSR Multi-Disciplinary Focus

The Journal of Service Research offers an international and multidisciplinary perspective on management practices in:

- Service marketing
- Service operations
- Service human resources
- e-Service
- Economics of service
- Service information systems
- Customer satisfaction and service quality

== Previous Editors ==
The following persons have been editors-in-chief of the journal:

Ming-Hui Huang (National Taiwan University)

Michael Brady (Florida State University)

Katherine Lemon (Boston College)

A. Parasuraman (University of Miami)

Mary Jo Bitner (Arizona State University)

Roland Rust (University of Maryland)

== Best Paper Award ==
Each year the editorial review board votes on the best research paper that was published during the prior publication year.

Past Winners:

Volume 21: Ming-Hui Huang and Roland T. Rust, "Artificial Intelligence in Service" (February 2018)

Volume 20: Jenny van Doorn, Martin Mende, Stephanie M. Noble, John Hulland, Amy L. Ostrom, Dhruv Grewal and J. Andrew Petersen, "Domo Arigato Mr. Roboto: Emergence of Automated Social Presence in Organizational Frontlines and Customers' Service Experiences" (February 2017)

Volume 19: Markus Blut, Cheng Wang and Klaus Schoefer, "Factors Influencing the Acceptance of Self-Service Technologies: A Meta-Analysis" (November 2016)

Volume 18: Jennifer D. Chandler and Robert F. Lusch, Service Systems: A Broadened Framework and Research Agenda on Value Propositions, Engagement, and Service Experience (February 2015)

Volume 17: David E. Bowen and Benjamin Schneider, "A Service Climate Synthesis and Future Research Agenda" (February 2014)

Volume 16: Crina O. Tarasi, Ruth N. Bolton, Anders Gustafsson, and Beth A. Walker, "Relationship Characteristics and Cash Flow Variability: Implications for Satisfaction, Loyalty, and Customer Portfolio Management" (May 2013)

Volume 15: Merlyn A. Griffiths and Mary C. Gilly, "Dibs! Customer Territorial Behaviors" (May 2012)

Volume 14: Andrea Ordanini and A. Parasuraman, "Service Innovation Viewed Through a Service-Dominant Logic Lens: A Conceptual Framework and Empirical Analysis," (February 2011)

Volume 13: Amy L. Ostrom, Mary Jo Bitner, Stephen W. Brown, Kevin A. Burkhard, Michael Goul, Vicki Smith-Daniels, Haluk Demirkan, and Elliot Rabinovich, "Moving Forward and Making a Difference: Research Priorities for the Science of Service," (February 2010)

Volume 12: Benjamin Schneider, William H. Macey, Wayne C. Lee, and Scott A. Young, "Organizational Service Climate Drivers of the American Customer Satisfaction Index (ACSI) and Financial and Market Performance," (August 2009)

Volume 11: Katherine N. Lemon and Florian v. Wangenheim, "The Reinforcing Effects of Loyalty Program Partnerships and Core Service Usage: A Longitudinal Analysis," (May 2009)

Volume 10: Janet Turner Parish, Leonard L. Berry and Shun Yin Lam, "The Effects of the Servicescape on Service Workers," (February 2008)

Volume 9: Denish Shah, Roland Rust, A. Parasuraman, Richard Staelin and George S. Day, "The Path to Customer Centricity," (November 2006)

Volume 8: Kevin P. Gwinner, Mary Jo Bitner, Stephen W. Brown, and Ajith Kumar, "Service Customization Through Employee Adaptiveness," (November 2005)

Volume 7: Parasuraman, A., Valarie A. Zeithaml, and Arvind Malhotra, "E-S-QUAL: A Multiple-Item Scale for Assessing Electronic Service Quality," (February 2005)

Volume 6: Keiningham, Timothy L., Tiffany Perkins-Munn, and Heather Evans, "The Impact of Customer Satisfaction on Share-of-Wallet in a Business-to-Business Environment," (August 2003)

Volume 5: Hogan, John E., Katherine N. Lemon and Barak Libai, "What is the True Value of a Lost Customer?" (February 2003)

Volume 4: Hennig-Thurau, Thorsten, Kevin P. Gwinner, and Dwayne D. Gremler, "Understanding Relationship Marketing Outcomes: An Integration of Relational Benefits and Relationship Quality," (February 2002)

Volume 3: Anderson, Eugene W. and Vikas Mittal, "Strengthening the Satisfaction Profit Chain," (November 2000)

Volume 2: Kumar, Piyush, "The Impact of Long-Term Client Relationships on the Performance of Business Service Firms," (August 1999)

Volume 1: Smith, Amy K. and Ruth Bolton, "An Experimental Investigation of Customer Reactions to Service Failure and Recovery Encounters: Paradox or Peril?" (August 1998)

== Special Issues ==
The journal has published special issues on various topics over the years.

Past special issues:

- Customer Engagement in Automated Service Interactions
- The Interface of Service and Sales
- Organizational Frontlines
- Transformative Service Research: A Multidisciplinary Perspective on Service and Well-being

Past special sections: Service Research in Health Care: Positively Impacting Lives, Journal of Service Research, Volume 19, Number 4, August 2016. Special section editors: Tracey Danaher and Andrew S. Gallan. https://journals.sagepub.com/toc/jsra/19/4

Future special issues:

- Frontlines-in-Change
- AI Service and Emotion

== Abstracting and Indexing ==
The journal is abstracted and indexed in Scopus and the Social Sciences Citation Index. According to the Journal Citation Reports, its 2017 impact factor is 6.842, ranking it 6th out of 140 journals in the category "Business".
