= Digital amnesia =

Digital amnesia may refer to:

- Digital obsolescence, the loss of information due to outdated technology required to retrieve it
- Google effect, the inability to remember important information because of the ease of looking online
