= Google effect =

Inability to remember important information because of the ease of looking online

The Google effect, also called digital amnesia, is the tendency to forget information that can be found readily online by using Internet search engines. According to the first study about the Google effect, people are less likely to remember certain details they believe will be accessible online. However, the study also claims that people's ability to learn information offline remains the same. This effect may also be seen as a change to what information and what level of detail is considered to be important to remember.

== History ==
The phenomenon was first described and named by Betsy Sparrow (Columbia University), Jenny Liu (University of Wisconsin–Madison) and Daniel M. Wegner (Harvard University) in their paper from July 2011. The study was conducted in four parts. The first part had subjects answer a number of both easy and difficult trivia questions, and then perform a modified Stroop task involving both everyday words and technology-related words such as screen and Google. Subjects were slower to respond to technology words, especially after difficult questions, indicating that trivia questions primed them to think of computers. In the second experiment, the subjects read a number of trivia statements. Half of them were led to believe the statements would be saved and available to look up later; the other half were explicitly instructed to attempt to remember them. Both groups were then tested on recall of the statements. In part three, subjects read and typed in trivia statements, and informed that their entry was erased or saved in a specific location. Afterwards, they were given a recognition task and asked whether they had seen the exact statement, whether it had been saved, and if the statement had been saved, where it had been saved. In the final part, subjects again typed trivia statements, and were told each had been saved in a generically named folder (e.g. items, facts). They were then given two different recall tasks: one for the statements, and one for the specific folder in which each statement was saved.

The study concluded with three main findings. First, people are primed to think of computers when asked general knowledge questions, even when they know the correct answer. In addition, this effect is especially pronounced if the question is difficult and the answer is unknown. Secondly, people do not tend to remember information if they believe it will be available to look up later. By contrast, an explicit instruction to remember the material does not have a significant effect on recall. Lastly, if the information is saved, people are much more likely to remember where the information is located than to recall the information itself. In addition, people tend to remember either the fact or the location, but not both; this effect persists even when the information is more memorable than the name of the location.

The term "digital amnesia" was coined by Kaspersky Lab for the results of an unreviewed survey in 2015 by the security vendor, which said, "The results reveal that the 'Google Effect' likely extends beyond online facts to include important personal information." Instead of remembering details, 91 percent of people used the Internet and 44 percent used their smartphone. Kaspersky Lab surveyed 1000 consumers in the United States, aged 16 and older. In most cases, people could not remember important information such as telephone numbers that should have been familiar, leading to the conclusion that they forgot the information because of the ease of finding it using devices.

== Cognitive mechanism ==
This effect can be understood under the mechanism of cognitive offloading, defined as "the use of physical action to alter the information processing requirements of a task so as to reduce cognitive demand". With respect to the Google effect, this indicates relying on the internet as a repository of information instead of encoding it internally, thereby reducing cognitive demand. Researchers Risko and Gilbert connect this to transactive memory systems, as also identified by Sparrow and colleagues, adding that the widespread availability of technology makes it easier to offload information that was previously stored internally.

=== Transactive memory ===
Sparrow et al. originally claimed that reliance on computers is a form of transactive memory, because people share information easily, forget what they think will be available later, and remember the location of information better than the information itself. They posited that people and their computers are becoming "interconnected systems"; the same underlying processes used in traditional transactive memory to learn who in our social networks know what is also being extended to encompass what a computer knows and how to find it. The reliance on computers has raised concerns, such as when it prevents one from processing information and internalizing it. In addition, people appear less confident in recalling information learned through Internet searching and that recent Internet searching may promote motivation to use the Internet.

However, several researchers have questioned whether the Google effect is a form of transactive memory, arguing that no transaction is going on between the person and the computer. Therefore, computer networks and the Internet cannot be conceived as a distributed cognitive system. Rather, computers are merely tools exploited to help trigger a memory or to easily look up information. Unlike in traditional transactive memory, the information is not lost without the Internet, but merely slower and more difficult to find.

=== Cognitive consequences ===
Research suggests the Google effect has broader cognitive consequences beyond memory storage. A review article by Kanbay and colleagues identified that digital amnesia affects multiple components of cognitive processing, such as access to information, storage, and recall, as well as broader functions of attention and critical thinking. Further, a 2015 study by Fisher and colleagues found across nine experiments that searching for information online led individuals to overestimate how much they knew, blurring the boundary between personal knowledge and externally accessible information. Follow-up research demonstrated that using the internet to answer one question increases the tendency to use it again for subsequent, and even relatively easier questions. This indicates a self-reinforcing cycle. A 2024 study by Cikurel extended the Google effect to judgment and decision-making, finding that search engine use can reduce information-processing depth and retention, and increase reliance on more salient cues when making investment judgments. The study also finds that the Google effect on judgments persists even when participants retain access to the information.

However, not all consequences of cognitive offloading appear negative. Storm and Stone found that saving information to a file improved memory for subsequently learned material, suggesting that offloading is beneficial by potentially freeing up mental capacity for new learning. Outside laboratory settings, a 2012 study by Lav R. Varshney proposed that the Google effect can also be seen in doctoral theses: a longitudinal increase in the number of references cited reflected a tendency for improved memory of where to find relevant information (i.e. which papers contain the information), rather than of the information itself, as also evidenced by Sparrow and colleagues.

== Neuroscience evidence ==
Researchers in the field of neuroscience have gathered evidence for this phenomenon. An fMRI study compared brain activation when participants recalled information learned through internet searching versus from an encyclopedia. Participants recalling internet-learned information showed decreased activation in several brain regions - including the bilateral occipital gyrus, left temporal gyrus, and bilateral middle frontal gyrus - and lower recall accuracy compared to the encyclopaedia group. Decreased activation in these regions during recall aligns with the finding by Sparrow and colleagues that internet users remember where to find the information than the information itself. With respect to short-term internet search behaviour, research has further demonstrated that using the internet in the short-term (here, a period of six days) altered brain activation patterns, with participants showing increased neural activation to use search engines when presented with unfamiliar questions. This suggests that dependency on the internet can develop rapidly. These findings indicate that reliance on internet searching may be associated with differences in how the brain processes and stores information.

Existing studies, however, have used relatively small samples and designs that measure participants at a single point in time rather than tracking changes over time, making it difficult to establish whether internet searching causes these neural changes or if pre-existing differences predispose individuals toward greater internet reliance.

== Differential effects ==
Research indicates that the Google effect is not uniform across individuals or populations. A meta-analysis review by Gong and Yang found that the effect is more pronounced among individuals who use the internet more frequently and among those who browse on mobile phones rather than computers. People with a larger existing knowledge base (people with more knowledge) appear less susceptible to the effect than those with a smaller knowledge base (less knowledge). Further in the review, participants in North America showed significantly greater susceptibility to the effect than those from other regions, suggesting that regional variation is also a determinant.

Further, the effect appears to vary across age groups. Younger adults who perceive themselves to be skilled internet users are more likely to report an effect of internet use on their memory, while older adults with limited internet experience show little evidence of the effect. Some studies have also examined gender differences in susceptibility to the Google effect, though findings have been inconsistent across different samples and age groups. However, the majority of research to date has been conducted with Western, educated, industrialised, rich, and democratic populations, limiting the cross-cultural generalisability of the phenomenon.

== Replication ==
In a large-scale replication study published in Nature in 2018, Camerer and colleagues attempted to replicate 21 social science experiments originally published in Nature and Science between 2010 and 2015. The Google effect, as reported by Sparrow et al., was among those experiments that could not be successfully replicated, raising questions about the robustness of the original findings. In 2020, a replication of this effect incorporating methodological recommendations made by the original authors in response to Camerer and colleagues also found no conclusive evidence for it. In contrast, researchers Schooler and Storm demonstrated that the Google effect was replicable, but only when participants had prior experience showing that saved information would remain accessible. Additionally, a 2024 meta-analysis by Gong and Yang synthesised findings across 35 studies and found that frequent internet search behaviour was associated with changes in how people process and remember information, providing support for the phenomenon.

These mixed findings reflect broader debates within psychology about the replicability of experimental results, a concern known as the replication crisis.

== Practical implications ==
The Google effect has implications for education and learning. If students expect to access information online later, they may not engage in deep levels of encoding information when studying, potentially reducing long-term retention of course material. This aligns with evidence that deeper processing of information leads to stronger and more durable memories. This may also reduce cognitive effort and diminish engagement in deep, reflective thinking.

Research has also raised concerns that offloading memory to external stores may leave individuals vulnerable to memory manipulation, as Risko and colleagues found that when externally stored information was altered without participants' knowledge, participants often failed to notice and incorporated the false information into their own memory. This concern extends to generative artificial intelligence tools, which may produce inaccurate and "hallucinated" information. However, research in this area is limited at present.

Nonetheless, some researchers have argued that this tendency to offload information may help in efficiently performing mental tasks requiring creativity and problem-solving, as people adaptively allocate cognitive resources.

== Cultural evolution perspective ==
From a cultural evolution perspective, the Google effect can be viewed as the latest development adding to a long, cumulative history of humans distributing knowledge across external stores. Anthropologist Joseph Henrich argues that cumulative cultural evolution depends on distributing knowledge beyond any single individual's memory. Specifically, Muthukrishna and Henrich describe this as the "collective brain", which is a system in which no single individual holds all relevant knowledge, but the group collectively possesses required knowledge and can access it. Recent research has further suggested that as technologies become more complex, cultural innovations for distributing cognition, including external memory systems, co-evolve with technological complexity. Thus, while in the present, memory encoding weakens when individuals expect future access to information, from an evolutionary angle, the Google effect may represent a continuation of an adaptive strategy.

== See also ==
- External memory (psychology)
- Exocortex
