= Pratham Mittal =

Indian entrepreneur and educator (1991)

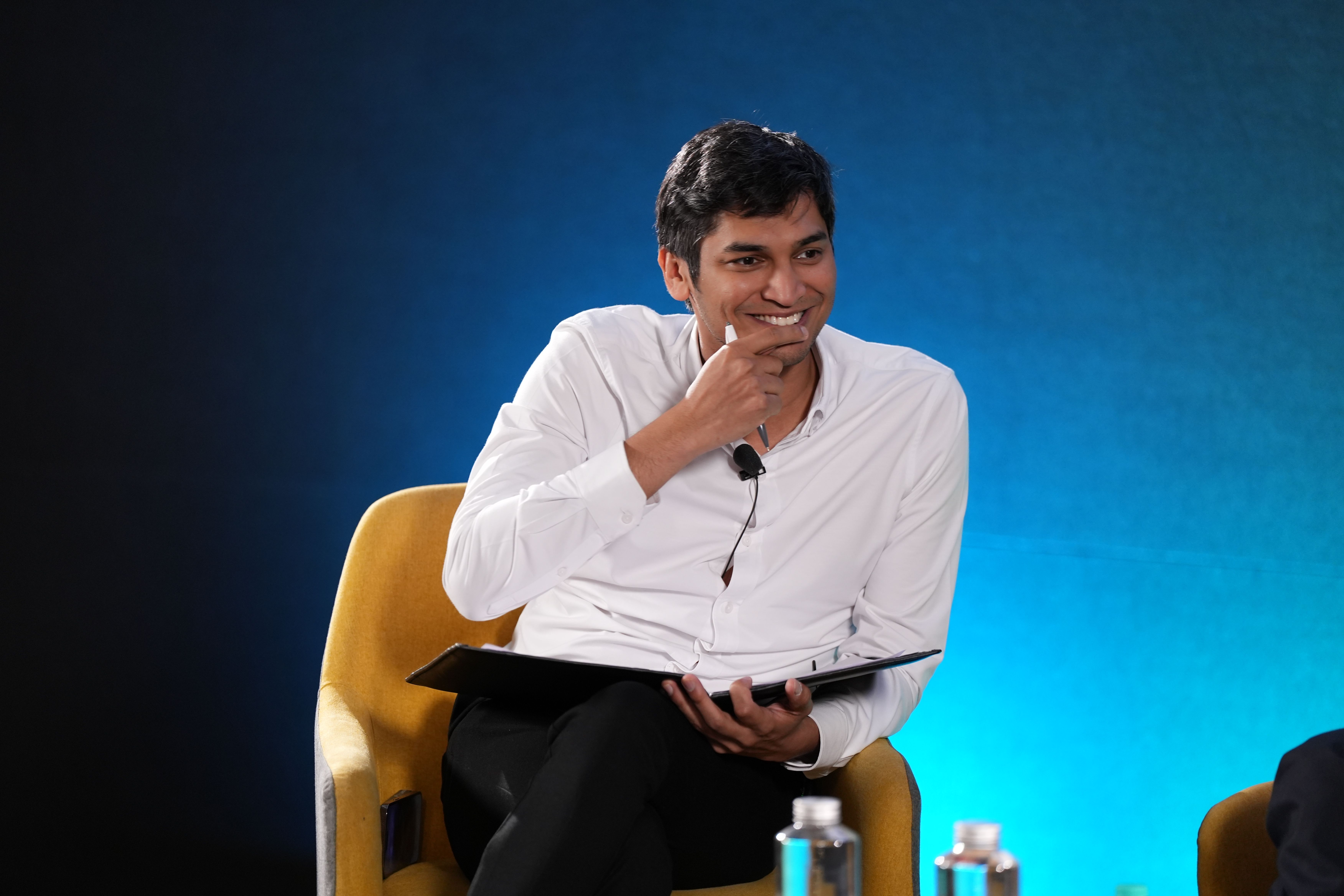
- Pratham Mittal in Conversation with Shrikant Vaidya and Neil George (Abbott India)
- Born: 27 May 1991 (age 35); Jalandhar, Punjab, India
- Education: The Doon School; University of Pennsylvania
- Occupations: Entrepreneur; educator
- Known for: Masters' Union University; Tetr College of Business; Outgrow
- Television: Judge, Shark Tank India (season 5)

Pratham Mittal (born 27 May 1991; Jalandhar, Punjab) is an Indian entrepreneur and educator. He is the founder of Masters' Union University, a private university in Gurugram, and Tetr College of Business, an undergraduate business school. He has appeared as a judge on Shark Tank India.

== Early life and education ==
Mittal was educated at The Doon School. He later graduated from the University of Pennsylvania's School of Engineering and Applied Science with a Bachelor of Science in engineering in systems engineering, as well as a degree in political science.Mittal is the son of Ashok Kumar Mittal who is the Chancellor of Lovely Professional University(LPU).

== Career ==
=== Outgrow (2016) ===
In 2016, while studying at the University of Pennsylvania, Mittal co-founded Outgrow with Randy Rayess. Outgrow is a software-as-a-service platform that develops tools for creating interactive content, including calculators, quizzes, and polls. The company originated from VenturePact, a software development marketplace previously established by Mittal and Rayess. Outgrow is headquartered in New York City. According to Mittal, Outgrow has been used by more than 4,000 publishers, including The New York Times and The Guardian.

=== Neta App (2018) ===
In 2018, Mittal launched the Neta App, a civic technology platform that enabled Indian voters to rate and review elected representatives at the state and national levels. The platform was piloted during the February 2018 by-elections in Rajasthan's Ajmer and Alwar constituencies and was later introduced in Karnataka ahead of the state's 2018 legislative assembly elections.

The app was formally launched in August 2018 by former President of India Pranab Mukherjee. According to Mittal, the platform had registered more than 1.6 crore verified voters by late 2018.

=== Masters' Union University (2020) ===
In August 2020, Mittal founded Masters' Union University in Gurugram, Haryana. The institution offers programmes in business and management, including a 16-month Post Graduate Programme in Technology and Business Management. It offers a 16-month Post Graduate Programme in Technology and Business Management.

The institution subsequently introduced undergraduate programmes, executive education courses, and a venture incubation programme

=== Tetr College of Business (2024) ===
In January 2024, Mittal founded Tetr College of Business, an undergraduate business school. The institution's curriculum involves study periods in multiple countries, including the United States, Singapore, India, Ghana, Argentina, the United Arab Emirates, and locations in Europe.

In November 2025, Tetr raised $18 million in its first institutional funding round, co-led by Owl Ventures and Bertelsmann India Investments.

According to the institution, applications increased by 50 percent in its second year, and the student intake expanded to 200 students from 50 countries. Tetr also reported an acceptance rate of approximately 2.6 percent and an average SAT score of about 1,490. The institution further stated that students in its inaugural cohort launched 44 ventures that generated more than $324,000 in combined revenue.

=== 606 Ventures ===
In 2021, Mittal became a partner at 606 Ventures, a venture capital fund investing in early-stage Indian companies.

== Television appearances ==
Mittal is a judge for the fifth season of Shark Tank India, which premiered in January 2026.
