= Tetr College of Business =

Private international business school

- New York, United States; Dubai, UAE; Gurugram, Haryana, India

Information
- School type: Private, International Business School
- Established: January 2022; 4 years ago
- Founder: Pratham Mittal
- Campus: UAE, India, Singapore, Ghana, United States, Argentina, Madrid, China
- Affiliation: UBI Business School (Europe and Asia), Cornell University, National University of Singapore, Fudan University School of Management (China), Illinois Institute of Technology, IIT Delhi, FITT, and INSEAD
- Website: tetr.com

Tetr College of Business, also known as Tetr, is a private business school founded in 2022 by the Indian entrepreneur Pratham Mittal, with its headquarters in New York City and an office in Gurugram, India.

The institution began operations in Dubai and spread across multiple countries to serve its cohort rotation model. The college follows an experiential academic model of learn by doing that includes international student rotations and venture-based coursework. By September 2026 Tetr had enrolled more than 600 undergraduates across three annual cohorts. It also runs a one-year master's programme.

== History ==
Tetr College of Business was established in 2022 by Pratham Mittal, who had previously founded the Masters' Union School of Business and the software company Outgrow. The institution was launched without a permanent campus, implementing a structure where student cohorts move between countries for different academic terms.

In November 2025, Tetr's parent entity raised approximately US$18 million in a Series A funding round co-led by Owl Ventures and Bertelsmann India Investments.

== Academics and model ==
Tetr College provides a four-year undergraduate Bachelor's program in management, technology, and artificial intelligence. Its academic model involves students completing successive terms in different international locations. Instruction is provided by visiting faculty and industry practitioners.

The school's degree-granting authority comes from its academic partnership with UBI Business School, which provides UK-accredited degrees. The college has also listed collaborations for specific modules or projects with institutions including Cornell University and the Indian Institute of Technology system.

== Other activities ==
In 2024, the college established Tetr Launchpad, a venture fund associated with student-led startups. Later that year, it announced the "Under 20" fund, a US$10 million initiative targeting early-stage startups founded by individuals under age 20. The college has also operated scholarship programs for Indian students and for social media creators enrolling in its programs.

== See also ==
- Entrepreneurship education
- Experiential learning
- List of business schools in Asia
- List of international schools
