= Interpersonal reflex =

Interpersonal reflex is a term elaborated by Timothy Leary and explained in the book, Interpersonal Diagnosis of Personality: A functional theory and methodology for personality evaluation (1957).

While examining recorded protocols of communications in adults, Leary discovered that typical patterns of interaction existed. Individual units of these behaviors were called interpersonal mechanisms or interpersonal reflexes. (p 96); "They are defined as the observable, expressive units of face-to-face social behavior."

These reflexes are automatic and involuntary responses to interpersonal situations. They are independent of the content of the communication. They are the individual's spontaneous methods of reacting to others.

Leary states, "The reflex manner in which human beings react to others and train others to respond to them in selective ways is, I believe, the most important single aspect of personality. The systematic estimates of a patient's repertoire of interpersonal reflexes is a key factor in functional diagnosis" (p 97).

Examining interpersonal reflexes helps to explain communication and behavioral patterns in healthy and unhealthy relationships. For example, tender, supportive operations tend to train others to agree, conciliate, and depend. Rigid autocratic individuals seek out docile admiring followers. Competitive, self-enhancing behavior pulls envy, distrust, inferiority feelings, and at times respectful admiration from others.

== See also ==
- Interpersonal circumplex

== Bibliography ==
- Leary, T. (1957). Interpersonal Diagnosis of Personality: A functional theory and methodology for personality evaluation. Ronald Press Company: New York.
