= Deborah H. Gruenfeld =

American social psychologist

Deborah H. Gruenfeld is an American social psychologist whose work examines the way people are transformed by the organizations and social structures in which they work. She is the author of numerous papers on the psychology of power and group behavior. She is the Joseph McDonald Professor of Organizational Behavior at the Stanford Graduate School of Business, and is also a co-director of the Executive Program for Women Leaders at the same institution, and is a board member of Stanford's Center for the Advancement of Women's Leadership. She was the inaugural chairholder of the Moghadam Family Professorship in 2008. She is a board member of the LeanIn Foundation.

== Work ==
Gruenfeld was a graduate student of Robert S. Wyer and the late Joseph E. McGrath at the University of Illinois. Her doctoral research on status and integrative complexity in decision-making groups, in part examining U.S. Supreme Court decisions, were awarded prizes by the American Psychological Association and the Society of Experimental Social Psychology. Her analysis of U.S. Supreme Court decisions took into consideration both the justices' status in their group as well as their ideological preferences, demonstrating that as justices gained power on the court or entered into majority coalitions their written opinions tended to become less complex and nuanced. Gruenfeld's research is featured in scholarly journals and referenced in lay publications, including The Wall Street Journal, The New Yorker, O: The Oprah Magazine, The Washington Post, and the Chicago Tribune.

=== Theory of Power ===
Together with Dacher Keltner and Cameron Anderson, both of the University of California, Berkeley; Gruenfeld has developed a theory of power that aims to present an integrative account of the effects of power on human behaviour, suggesting that the acquisition of power has a disinhibiting effect regarding the social consequences of exercising it. The course was the inspiration for Acting With Power: Why We Are More Powerful Than We Believe, Gruenfeld's 2020 book. Gruenfeld describes misconceptions around power, which she defines as a "central organizing force" in society, affording connection as well as control, and as "a resource that exists for the protection of groups."

== Lawsuit ==
In 2015, Poets & Quants, a blog that covers MBA programs around the world, made public a wrongful termination suit filed by Gruenfeld's estranged husband, James A. Phills, who had been another professor at the business school. Phills alleged his firing was driven by the affair that Gruenfeld was having with the dean of the business school, Garth Saloner, apparently with the knowledge of the Stanford's Provost, John Etchemendy. The matter led to resignation of Saloner in 2015 and was covered by The New York Times, The Wall Street Journal, and Bloomberg. On August 1, 2017, a Santa Clara Superior Court judge rejected this suit, deciding that Phills had failed to prove he'd been discriminated against, harassed, or wrongfully terminated.

== Personal ==
In an interview by Dennis Relojo-Howell, Gruenfeld shares that she is an art person; always looking for artistic works to alleviate stress.
