= Dennis Epple =

American economist

Dennis N. Epple is a US American economist and currently the Thomas Lord University Professor of Economics at Carnegie Mellon's Tepper School of Business. He belongs to the leading scholars in the fields of the economics of education, and urban and real estate economics.

== Biography ==
Dennis Epple earned a B.S. in aeronautical engineering from Purdue University in 1968, whereafter he briefly worked as an engineer for the McDonnell Douglas Corporation (1968–69). Epple subsequently changed to the social sciences, earning a Master of Public Affairs from Princeton's Woodrow Wilson School of Public and International Affairs in 1971 as well as a M.S. and a Ph.D. in economics from Princeton in 1973 and 1975. Since 1974, Epple has worked at Carnegie Mellon University (CMU), first as an assistant professor of economics (1974–78), then as associate professor (1978–83), and finally as full professor (since 1983). Following a short position as Gary A. Rosenberg Professor of Real Estate, Finance, and Economics and Director of the Center for Real Estate Research at Northwestern University (1994–95), Epple was made the Thomas Lord Professor of Economics in 1996 and a University Professor in 2013. Moreover, he briefly worked as a fellow at the Hoover Institution and maintains a courtesy affiliation with the H.J. Heinz III School of Public Policy and Management at CMU. In terms of professional service, Epple repeatedly served as Head of Economics (1980–84, 2005–14) at CMU and continues to serve on CMU's Steering Committee Program for Interdisciplinary Education Research (2010-) and their Budget and Financial Affairs Committee (2014-). He also performed editorial functions with the American Economic Review (1994–2003), Quarterly Journal of Economics (2001–05) and Journal of Public Economics (2006–14), among others. In 2003, Epple's contributions to economic research were rewarded with a fellowship of the Econometric Society. He currently resides as a Member of the Editorial Review Board for Research in Economics (2015-) while also being a Committee Member of the American Economic Association (2016-).

== Research ==
Dennis Epple's research focuses on political economics, the economics of education, and public finance. More specifically, influenced by the Tiebout hypothesis, Epple has extensively published on the public decision-making, financing and provision of private and public goods and services in local settings, e.g. on fiscal decentralization. Since the late 1990s, this research has branched out into extensive work on topics related to the economics of education (generally together with Richard Romano) such as peer effects, charter schools or school vouchers. Additionally, in the 1990s, Epple published a series of influential articles on the topic of learning curves in industrial organisations (with Linda Argote) and product differentiation. According to IDEAS/RePEc, Epple belongs to the top 2% of most cited economists worldwide.

=== The political and public economics of local government ===
After an early interest in environmental economics, research on the Tiebout hypothesis, led Dennis Epple to adopt a perspective framed by competition between different localities; this perspective is present in much of his research on public and political economics, including school competition. In further research on interjurisdictional competition with Thomas Romer and Radu Filimon, Epple has explored the conditions under which there is an equilibrium between mobile consumers' choices in terms of housing location and public goods provision and how much scope for local redistribution there is if taxpayers are mobile or differ in preferences and incomes. In research with Holger Sieg (and Thomas Romer) in the late 1990s and early 2000s, Epple has further investigated the estimation of structural general equilibrium models of interjurisdictional competition. Corresponding applications, e.g. in the Boston Metropolitan Area, have found evidence of sophisticated voting behaviour in line with households' sorting into communities with similar public spending preferences and rejected myopic voting. Finally, in work with Richard Romano during the mid-1990s, Epple has studied how the presence of private alternatives affects public service provision in theory, finding (among else) that the public provision of services without restrictions on privately purchased supplements will be preferred by a majority of households relative to purely market or government-based provision systems, would maximize public and private expenditure on the public good, and be opposed by both poor and rich households.

=== Learning in industrial organisations ===
In the 1990s, Dennis Epple and Linda Argote contributed substantially to the theory of organizational learning. While Epple and Argote observe learning curves in many manufacturing organisations, they also observe considerable variation in the extent to which organisations' productivity increases in production, which they attribute to differences between organizations "memories", employee turnover, economies of scale and knowledge transfers from other products and organisations. Such transfers of knowledge are also observed across production shifts within the same plant and across stores owned by the same franchisee.

=== Economics of education ===
In 1998, Epple and Richard Romano developed a seminal model of competition between tuition-financed private schools, tax-financed, tuition-free public schools and students that differ in terms of ability and income. The model predicts that private schools will attempt to vary tuition to attract relatively able students through tuition discounts as less able yet wealthy students benefit from the educational peer effects due to their more talented but poorer peers. With regard to public and private schools, these predictions are borne out by later work with David Figlio, which moreover asserts that students' income plays a stronger role in determining placement in the hierarchy of private schools the more public school expenditure falls. In an extension, Epple, Romano and Elizabeth Newlon study the effect of student tracking on school competition and predict that tracking would increase the share of high ability students in public schools but also push wealthy, low-ability students into private education, which attracts the wealthiest and most talented students. These findings have led Epple and Romano to caution that the introduction of municipal school choice programmes may drive wealthy households out of the city centers into the suburbs. To prevent private schools from "skimming off" the wealthiest and most talented students, they argue in favour of sophisticated combinations of tuition floors and ceilings, which allow school vouchers to provide the benefits of school competition without making participation in the voucher system compulsory or abiding very high levels of educational stratification. Finally, Epple's and Romano's work on the impact of educational peer effects on student sorting into private and public education has also been applied (together with Holger Sieg) to higher education, which also witnesses the emergence of a hierarchy of schools in terms of quality that is associated with corresponding stratification among students by income and ability.
