= Robert L. Joss =

American businessman (born 1941)

Bob Joss AC

8th Dean of Stanford Graduate School of Business
- In office September 1, 1999 – August 31, 2009
- President: Gerhard Casper; John L. Hennessy
- Preceded by: A. Michael Spence
- Succeeded by: Garth Saloner

Personal details
- Born: Robert Law Joss; June 5, 1941 (age 85) Ticonderoga, New York, United States
- Education: University of Washington (BA); Stanford University (MBA, PhD)
- Occupation: Businessman, banker, company director

Robert Law Joss AC (born June 5, 1941) is an American banker and academic administrator. He served as chief executive officer of Westpac Banking Corporation from 1993 to 1999 and dean of the Stanford Graduate School of Business from 1999 to 2009. He is the Philip H. Knight Professor and Dean Emeritus at Stanford. In 2016, he was appointed a Companion of the Order of Australia (AC).

== Early life and education ==
Joss grew up in Spokane, Washington, and attended public schools there, including Wilson Grade School and Lewis and Clark High School, where he served as student body president, was named valedictorian, and captained the basketball team, earning all-city honors.

Joss received his Bachelor of Arts degree in economics from the University of Washington in 1963, graduating magna cum laude and as a member of Phi Beta Kappa. While at the University of Washington, he served as student body president during the 1962–1963 academic year. He was a Sloan Fellow at Stanford University from 1965 to 1966, where he subsequently earned his Master of Business Administration in 1967 and his Doctor of Philosophy in 1970.

== Career ==
=== Government and banking ===
In 1968, Joss was selected as a White House Fellow and assigned to the United States Department of the Treasury. He served as deputy to Assistant Secretary for Economic Policy Murray Weidenbaum. The two worked on the Nixon administration's proposal for general revenue sharing with state and local governments. Their responsibilities included developing the proposal, working with members of Congress to secure its passage and representing the Treasury at interagency meetings on domestic economic policy.

Joss delivered speeches across the United States in support of revenue sharing and participated in the legislative process that led to the State and Local Fiscal Assistance Act of 1972. He attended the bill-signing ceremony with President Richard Nixon in Philadelphia in October 1972. His work with Weidenbaum also informed their 1970 article on alternative approaches to revenue sharing, published in the National Tax Journal. Joss received a Meritorious Service Award from the Treasury Department in 1971.

Joss joined Wells Fargo Bank in 1971. During his first 15 years, he held six positions, with responsibilities covering corporate strategy, corporate human resources, international investments, foreign-exchange trading, strategy and risk management, the Asia-Pacific division, and trust and investment management. He became vice chairman in 1986 and held the position until 1993.

In February 1993, Joss joined Westpac Banking Corporation in Australia as managing director and chief executive officer. The appointment followed the bank's 1992 financial loss, then the largest in Australian corporate history. Westpac had undertaken a search for new leadership, and Joss was recruited from Wells Fargo to lead its recovery.

His initial priorities included reducing expenses, addressing impaired loans and restoring the bank's financial position. He also sought to refocus its operations on Australia and New Zealand, while winding down overseas activities that did not contribute to the bank's financial performance or strategic objectives.

Joss served as chairman of the Australian Bankers' Association and participated in discussions on Australian financial policy, including tax reform. His time at Westpac was also documented in Managing in Australia (1999), which he co-authored with Frank Blount and David Marr. The book examined management and business practices in Australia and included material on his experience at Westpac.

Joss left Westpac in 1999 to become dean of Stanford University's Graduate School of Business.

He has served on the boards of several financial, industrial and educational organizations. His former directorships include Citigroup, Wells Fargo, Westpac, Shanghai Commercial Bank, SoFi, Agilent Technologies, Makena Capital Management, Bechtel, SRI International and Sallie Mae. He has also served as a director of CM Capital and as a trustee of the National Center on Education and the Economy. In 2013, the Australian Financial Review included him among 50 figures identified as having shaped Australia's business landscape over the preceding half-century.

=== Stanford Graduate School of Business ===
Joss became the eighth dean of the Stanford Graduate School of Business in 1999 and served until 2009. His tenure included changes to the MBA curriculum, increased collaboration with other Stanford departments and schools, and the planning and development of a new campus.

In 2007, the school introduced a revised MBA curriculum emphasizing individualized learning, leadership development, interdisciplinary study and international experience. Joss also supported cross-university collaboration at Stanford, including the development of joint-degree programmes and research centres focused on leadership, global business and the economy, and social innovation. Joss oversaw the planning, design and initial construction of the Knight Management Center, a new campus intended to replace the school's older facilities. The project secured the necessary approvals and funding and included eight buildings on a 12.5-acre site. The campus opened in 2011, two years after Joss left the deanship. During his final years as dean, the global financial crisis and declining endowment values led to budget reductions and expenditure cuts at the school. Joss stepped down in 2009 and continued at Stanford as the Philip H. Knight Professor and Dean Emeritus.

=== Teaching and academic activities ===
Following his tenure as dean, Joss continued teaching in Stanford's MBA programme, with courses covering leadership, management and organizational development. He also taught in the Stanford Leadership Academy, a professional development programme for university faculty and administrative staff. Its curriculum covers organizational leadership, strategic planning, team development, communication and change management. Joss served as faculty co-director of the academy from 2018 to 2025. He has also taught in executive education programmes at the Stanford Graduate School of Business.

=== American–Australian relations ===
Joss has been involved in organizations promoting relations between the United States and Australia. He was a founding director of the United States Studies Centre at the University of Sydney and was subsequently invited to join the Ambassadors' Council of the American Australian Association.

== Research and publications ==
Joss's published work includes research on public finance, revenue sharing and management. His early academic writing examined government policy and the relationship between public institutions and economic decision-making. His later publications and teaching have addressed management practices, organizational performance and leadership development.

=== Public finance and economic policy ===
In 1970, Joss co-authored "Alternative Approaches to Revenue Sharing: A Description and Framework for Evaluation" with Murray Weidenbaum. Published in the National Tax Journal, the article examined different approaches to revenue sharing between federal and state and local governments. It was written during their work at the United States Department of the Treasury on the Nixon administration's revenue-sharing proposal.

In a 2007 lecture at the Melbourne Centre for Financial Studies, Joss discussed changes in financial intermediation and the growing involvement of brokers, insurers, credit-rating agencies and investors in transactions traditionally handled by banks.

=== Management and organizational performance ===
In "Management", published in the Australian Journal of Management in 2001, Joss examined the role of management in economic development and organizational performance. His work addressed managerial decision-making and the implementation of economic reforms.

== Honours ==
- Companion of the Order of Australia (AC), 2016
- Ernest C. Arbuckle Award, Stanford Graduate School of Business Alumni Association, 2012
- Honorary doctorate in business, Konkuk University, South Korea, 2009
- Centenary Medal, Australian government, 2001
- Meritorious Service Award, United States Department of the Treasury, 1971
- Phi Beta Kappa, University of Washington, 1963

Business positions
Preceded by Frank Conroy	Chief Executive Officer of Westpac; 1993 – 1999	Succeeded by David Morgan
