= Ironic process theory =

Inability of the mind to avoid thinking unwanted thoughts or emotions

In psychology, ironic process theory (IPT), also known as the pink elephant paradox, ironic rebound, the white bear problem or white bear phenomenon, suggests that when an individual intentionally tries to avoid thinking a certain thought or feeling a certain emotion, a paradoxical effect is produced: the attempted avoidance not only fails in its object but in fact causes the thought or emotion to occur more frequently and more intensely.

The phenomenon was identified through thought suppression studies in experimental psychology. Social psychologist Daniel Wegner first studied ironic process theory in a laboratory setting in 1987. Ironic mental processes have been shown in a variety of situations, where they are usually created by or worsened by stress. In extreme cases, ironic mental processes result in intrusive thoughts about doing something immoral or out of character, which can be troubling to the individual. These findings have since guided clinical practice. For example, they show why it would be unproductive to try to suppress anxiety-producing or depressing thoughts.

== Original experiment ==
The first study investigating the paradoxical effects of thought suppression was conducted by Daniel Wegner in a laboratory in 1987. Wegner was an American social psychologist in the field of mental control, conscious will, etc. His interest of thought suppression was based on Freud's psychopathology theory. Freud posited that it was the unconscious that helped hide unwanted thoughts, but he failed to explain daily cases where individuals deliberately make effort to suppress a thought. Meanwhile, studies have shown that conscious thought suppression is difficult as those thoughts always linger in the mind. To explain these, some researchers started investigation. Wegner was one of them, and he conducted two laboratory experiments in 1987, asking participants to will away the thought of a white bear.

In the first study, 34 participants were asked to read instructions inducing them to describe their thoughts verbally. They were randomly allocated to either initial suppression or initial expression condition. The two conditions only differed in the order of tasks. The expression task instructed participants to think of a white bear; the suppression task instructed them not to. In both tasks, participants had to ring a bell every time they thought of a white bear. Results showed that the initial suppression group exhibited more frequent thought of the white bear in the expression task. Initial suppression, hence, produced a rebound effect.

The second experiment added a third group, asking participants to think of a red Volkswagen as a distractor during the suppression task. The results confirmed previous findings but showed that a distractor alleviated the paradoxical result caused by initial suppression as the third group rang the bell less frequently.

Wegner explains that when individuals try to suppress a thought, they may feel it difficult and then become curious about why the thought is so persistent. Although they may be able to suppress the thought temporarily, later reminders of the thought can produce a preoccupation with the formerly hidden thought. Initial suppression therefore paradoxically increases the frequency of unwanted thoughts eventually.

== Mechanism ==
Wegner claims that successful thought suppression requires two distinct mental processes, that must be performed simultaneously. The first process is the operating process, which occupies mental resources to will away the unwanted thought, object, or emotion that is persistent in the mind. It works continuously until the thought is cleared completely. The second one is the monitoring process, which acts as a detector searching for unwanted thoughts. It then replaces them by shifting attention to other objects.

When individuals' attention is on another task, their mental resources become limited, making it difficult to conduct the operating process. However, the monitoring process is still running, making individuals aware of those unwanted thoughts. The shutdown of operating processes and the continuance of monitoring reduce their ability to suppress the thoughts, and the unwanted thoughts eventually become even more prominent.

This theory explains the effects of increased cognitive load by emphasizing that where there is cognitive effort, the monitoring process may supplant the conscious process, while also suggesting that in order for thought suppression to be effective, a balance between the two processes must exist, with the cognitive demand not being so great as to let the monitoring process interrupt the conscious processes. A 2006 study found that individual differences may be able to account for differences.

== Evidence ==
=== Eating behaviour of restrained eaters ===
The ironic process theory predicts that suppressing the desire to eat can paradoxically lead to overeating due to limited cognitive resources. Boom et al. conducted an experiment in 2002 to investigate the interaction between suppression, distraction, and the perceived calorie content of the food stimuli. The experiment was a "2 (restrained/unrestrained) * 2 (distraction yes/no) * 2 (perceived calories high/low) design, in which subjects consumed ice cream in a taste test situation." Ice-cream consumption was then measured. Results showed that restrained participants ate more than unrestrained participants, and when there was a distraction, they ate even more. These findings supported the theory. Their attempts to inhibit their desire to eat only produced an ironic result—eating more ice cream.

=== Anger suppression on pain severity and pain behaviours ===
Burns et al. conducted an experiment in 2008 to investigate the relationship between anger suppression, pain severity, and pain behaviours in chronic low back pain patients. Based on Ironic Process Theory, the researchers supposed that the initial suppression of anger would ironically make the feeling of anger more intense. Participants were randomly assigned to either the suppression or no suppression group. During the experiment, they first completed a task inducing their anger, with a pain behaviour task following. Results showed that the suppression group reported greater anger and pain intensity. They also demonstrated more pain behaviors. "Attempts to suppress anger may aggravate pain related to their clinical condition through ironically increased feelings of anger."

== Application ==
The ironic process theory can be applied in the treatment for patients with mood disorders, such as anxiety and depression. The attempts of those patients who try to avoid their negative thoughts and feelings, such as suicidal ideas and frustration, may contradictorily make the thoughts even more persistent in their minds. "Trying not to be sad could over time engender severe sadness." Therefore, therapists should inform patients that negative thoughts may be beneficial and encourage them to accept their feelings rather than suppress them. Studies have also proved that this method could reduce depression.

=== Memorization and mnemonics ===
Although in certain domains, such as memorization, it appears that ironic effects of attempting to remember vary with the level of mental control over mnemonic processing and may simply be due to ineffective mental strategies.

"Intentional memory processes and their associated mnemonic strategies can be viewed as one form of mental control", When we attempt to exert influence over our memories we engage in mental control in the form of mnemonics our faculties of memory". because "mental control occurs when people suppress a thought, concentrate on a sensation, inhibit an emotion, maintain a mood, stir up a desire, squelch a craving, or otherwise exert influence on their own mental states".

=== Experience sampling ===
The experience sampling or daily diary method is one way that psychologists attempt to scientifically measure thoughts. This involves "interrupting people as they go about their daily lives and asking them to record the thoughts they are having right at that moment, in that place", often by using "clickers".

One research team at Ohio State University tried to figure out how often people think about sex by using so-called "clickers", asking the 283 college students to click each time they thought about sex, food, or sleep (there were three groups of students). The study found that on average men had 19 thoughts about sex per day (the highest being 388 times per day) whereas women thought about sex ten times per day. Among the study's flaws were that the researchers had not taken ironic process theory into their experimental design—students "were given a clicker by the researchers and asked to record when they thought about sex (or food or sleep). Imagine them walking away from the psychology department, holding the clicker in their hand, trying hard not to think about sex all the time, yet also trying hard to remember to press the clicker every time they did think about it."

== Criticism ==
The generalisability of the theory is still in question. Wegner's study used a white bear, and later studies in this area only used one stimulus as well. It is not known if similar results will be found when other stimuli are used, as the nature of the thought being suppressed, such as whether it is emotional, easily imagined, familiar, or complex, may impact the results.

== Earlier references ==
In Winter Notes on Summer Impressions (1863), Russian author Fyodor Dostoevsky wrote: "Try to pose for yourself this task: not to think of a polar bear, and you will see that the cursed thing will come to mind every minute." Wegner's determination to devise and carry out the white bear experiments was originally inspired by Dostoevsky's observation.

In 1952, Frank H. Richardson used the dictum "there is no such thing as a psychological negative" as advice to boys on how to avoid sexual thoughts and be "clean-minded":

The other thing I'd like you to remember is that there is no such thing as a 'psychological negative.' Sounds very technical, doesn't it? But in reality it's very simple. Let me give you an example of what it means.

Suppose I were to say to you, 'Now don't think about the end of your nose. Whatever else you do, don't think about the end of your nose! Now, remember what I say, Don, you must not think about the end of your nose!!!

You'd probably tell me, if you were not too polite, 'Well, if you'll only stop telling me not to think about it, I won't. But as long as you keep telling me not to think about it, and as long as I keep trying not to think about it, I simply can't help thinking about it.'

That's what is meant by the law, 'There is no such thing as a psychological negative.' You cannot 'not think' about something. All you can do is to think about something else. So don't be worried if these smutty thoughts keep flying over your head. Don't waste a minute trying to 'not think' about them. Just think about something else.

— for BOYS only, The Doctor Discusses the Mysteries of Manhood, Doctor, can you tell me?

In 1965, Eve Merriam published the picture book Don't Think about a White Bear. In 1970, Cary A. Lind registered a song titled "Don't Think of Elephants". In 1974, the modern expression "[don't] think of a pink elephant" appeared in Curt Siodmak's City In the Sky:

I know how bad off I am. He doesn't even want me to think. Tell a man he shouldn't think of a pink elephant and he can't get that beast out of his mind! My mind starts walking its own road as soon as I close my eyes.

== Alternative ==
Psychological reactance theory is an alternative explanation for ironic process phenomena. This theory suggests that humans have an innate need for freedom, and that when their autonomy is threatened they experience an unpleasant emotional arousal – reactance. Reactive thoughts and behaviours arise to guard their autonomy against the threat. In the case of the white bear experiment, participants felt a loss of freedom when they were asked not to think of a white bear. They then thought of the bear even more to reestablish their autonomy.

== In popular culture ==
Similar ideas appear throughout popular culture and sayings, often with variations on animal and color, such as "It's as hard as trying not to think of a pink rhinoceros."

Ironic process theory is also the basis for the mind game known as "The Game", which constitutes trying not to think about the Game.

At the end of the 1984 movie Ghostbusters, the characters are asked to think of a form for the coming of Gozer. They instruct each other not to think of anything that sees. One of the team, Ray, thinks of what he considers to be an innocuous thought of the Stay Puft Marshmallow Man, who then terrorizes them.

The idea figures heavily into the episode "White Bear" of British television series Black Mirror.

== See also ==
- Apophasis
- Reactance (psychology)
- Reverse psychology
- Seeing pink elephants
- Self-fulfilling prophecy
- Streisand effect
