= External memory (psychology) =

External memory is memory that uses cues from the environment to aid in the remembrance of ideas and sensations. When a person uses something besides their own internal memory tricks, traits, or talents to help remember certain events, facts, or even things to do, they are using an external memory aid. External memory aids are used every day. A large part of these aids comes from technology; people use their smartphones to remind them when they have meetings, and Facebook reminds people of their friends' birthdays. These aids also include taking notes in class, carrying a grocery list to the supermarket, or jotting down dates on a planner. Even people, or prompters, can be used as external memory aids.

== Oral tradition and the externalization of memory ==
In Plato's Phaedrus, Socrates tells the story of how Theuth, the Egyptian god and inventor of writing, approached the king of Egypt, Themis, in order to offer the Egyptian people what he regarded as a branch of learning that would improve memory. Themis, however, was wary of the implications the written word would have on memory. He believed that, if the Egyptian people were to take up writing, their reliance on their internal memory would decrease in exchange for external memory. He was of the opinion that writing was a "recipe not for memory, but for reminding" and the person relying on the written word would only give off the illusion of a person possessing knowledge.

"Buddha's teachings were passed down in an unbroken chain of oral tradition for four centuries until they were committed to writing in Sri Lanka in the first century BC." In 1920, Milman Parry, in his master's thesis, discovered that the stylistic quirks and bizarre repetition found in the Odyssey and the Iliad were evidence of the works' oral transmission. The use of "clever Odysseus" and "swift-footed Achilles" is this evidence. Walter Ong, priest, philosopher, and English professor, has found that people remember best when things are rhythmic and repeated. This repetition is in use in many fairy tales. The use of the "brave prince" and the "beautiful princess" time and time again was necessary to keep the oral tradition alive.

By fifth century BC, many texts had been committed to paper, scrolls as long as 60 feet to be more precise. At this time, written works were meant to be external memory aids. These written works were also written in scriptio continua; words were connected without spaces and sentences were connected without punctuation, making it difficult for the reader to read the words without reading them aloud. It is because of scriptio continua that most reading in the Middle Ages was done aloud and often with an audience. Also for this reason, those who read had to memorize the text in part before reading it to audiences because they had to remember where one word began and another ended and when to pause. It was not until the ninth century that spacing and punctuation came to be.

The reading and memory dynamic was very different. Books were a rare commodity; simply having access to a book one day did not imply access to it the next. Also at this point in time, books were not bound with outward facing spines; they were quite heavy, and lacked indexes. Even if one did have access to a book, it was unlikely that he/she would be able to find what he/she was looking for without having read and even become familiar with the book from top to bottom. In this point in time, external memory and internal memory blended together. Manuscripts were copied in order for the copier to memorize them. Instruction manuals, external memory aids, by Romans like Cicero and Quintilian also existed in order to teach readers how to use internal memory aids. Although, Quintilian agreed with Socrates' views on writing in Plato's Phaedrus'.

"In the fifteenth century, Gutenberg came along and turned books into mass produced commodities, and eventually it was no longer all that important to remember what the printed page could remember for you". As books became easier to consult, it became less relevant to commit them to memory. It is argued that modern day society has almost completely replaced internal memory with external memory. "The externalization of memory not only changed how people think; it also led to a profound shift in the very notion of what it means to be intelligent. Internal memory became devalued. Erudition evolved from possessing information internally to knowing how and where to find it in the labyrinthine world of external memory."

By January 1980, as evidenced by two interview studies conducted by John E. Harris, external memory aids were said to be used more often than internal memory aids. Subjects in both studies were asked what memory aids they used and to rate how often they used them. The studies set out to compare the reported frequencies of external memory aids (such as the ones listed below) with internal memory aids (see mnemonics or the method of loci). Both studies consisted of 30 participants. In the first study, all 30 participants were university students (15 male and 15 female). In the second, the participants were 30 adult women. Both studies yielded the same result: external memory aids are used more frequently than internal memory aids.

== Non-electronic external memory aids ==
External memory aids came to be through Theuth's invention of writing and other advances such as the Gutenberg Press. An external memory aid can be a post it note reminding one to do laundry or a grocery list reminding one to buy detergent.

Other examples include:

- Checklist: used to record lists for items (e.g., shopping list) and/or steps for specific routines (e.g., laundry routine, homework routine)
- Wall calendar or pocket calendar: used to record/check appointments and events (e.g., doctor’s appointments, birthdays)
- Notebooks/daily planner: used to record/check information across several categories (e.g., calendars, contact information, expenses)
- Timer: used to monitor time during specific activities (e.g., homework, cooking task)
- Medication boxes: used to organize medications by day and time

=== Collective memory/transactive memory ===
Other individuals may also be used as external memory aids. Before the development of technology, individuals still had access to collective memory. First referred to as transactive memory by Daniel Wegner, the idea is (basically): An individual may know things that other people do not know while other people know things that that individual does not. Together, individuals know more than apart. "In any long-term relationship, a team work environment, or other ongoing group, people typically develop a group or transactive memory, a combination of memory stores held directly by individuals and the memory stores they can access because they know someone who knows that information. Like linked computers that can address each other’s memories, people in dyads or groups form transactive memory systems."

== Electronic external memory aids ==
Examples of electronic external memory aids:

- Digital voice recorder: a device used to record information "in the moment" for later recall. Example: Olympus Voice recorder
- Programmable watch: a wristwatch used for alarms/reminders to help recall important activities/events. Example: Timex DataLink
- PDA (personal digital assistant): a "pocket computer" with several features including: alarms, calendar, contact information, internet, e-mail, and music. Example: iPod Touch
- Cell phone: a mobile phone that includes contact information; several models include alarm/calendar programs, and camera. Example: Samsung, Jitterbug
- Smartphone: a device that combines a full-featured mobile phone with handheld computer functions as well as GPS (global positioning system). Example: iPhone, BlackBerry

=== The Google effect ===
What Socrates and Quintilian feared is still debated in modern-day society. Thanks to the Internet and common search engines like Google, often referred to as humankind's collective memory, remembering seems to be less important than it once was. With the right search cues and the click of a button, any person can find almost any piece of information. The Google effect, also called digital amnesia, refers to the tendency to forget information that can be found readily online by using Internet search engines such as Google.

Betsy Sparrow (Columbia), Jenny Liu (Wisconsin) and Daniel M. Wegner (Harvard) described the Google effect in July 2011 after having conducted four experiments. They found that the participants thought about search engines when searching for information. Perhaps, the most important finding from their studies suggests that individuals have a tendency to forget information that they believe will be readily available to them in the future. In other words, why remember certain information if it is easily assemble through the use of an on-hand electronic device? Fortunately, their studies also claimed that people's ability to learn information offline remains the same.

== Effect of external memory aids on ability to remember ==
Almost from the first examples of external memory, the practice has been the subject of much criticism. Detractors of externalized memory assert that recording events and information externally is causing the internal human memory to degrade. In Plato's Phaedrus, Socrates said of writing that it would "implant forgetfulness in [men's] souls". Concerns along these lines were expressed by many throughout history, and at every stage of development. Today this belief is more prevalent than ever, but it focuses mostly on electronic examples of externalities memory. The Google effect, as described above, is a primary example of these concerns.

Much of the criticism about external memory is a product of common misconceptions about memory; specifically, the fact that people are very poor judges of it. Most people believe that they remember far more than they actually do in practice. This is especially true of verbatim memory: generally, a person will recall the general ideas of a text or conversation rather than the exact words that were used. Even so, most people believe that they can recall conversations word-for-word. Because we cannot know what we do not know, people tend to have an inflated view of how well the human mind can remember. As such, it is not surprising that the importance of external memory aids is often underestimated, and that the belief in its purported negative effects is so widespread.

While the idea that externalized memory degrades the innate capacity of humans to remember is prevalent, it is also unsubstantiated. Scientific investigations have failed to demonstrate any connection between technology usage and impaired memory. In addition, studies have concluded that the remarkable verbatim memories held up as the ideal by those who criticize the modern memory are not, in fact, verbatim. Instead, each retelling in oral tradition is a reconstruction of a story using given structural principles, allowing for a great deal of variation over time. Easy access to external sources of information may cause specific information to be remembered less thoroughly, but the overall memory capacity is undiminished. In fact, external memory aids can assist internal memory by providing retrieval cues that allow access to otherwise inaccessible memories.

== Human transience ==
The externalization of memory calls into question humankind's transience. "If memory is our means of preserving that which we consider most valuable, it is also painfully linked to our own transience. When we die, our memories die with us. In a sense, the elaborate system of externalized memory we’ve created is a way of fending off mortality. It allows ideas to be efficiently passed across time and space, and for one idea to build on another to a degree not possible when a thought has to be passed from brain to brain in order to be sustained."

=== Lifelogging ===
There are extreme uses of external memory aids. Individuals who constantly record their lives are referred to as lifeloggers. Gordon Bell was an American engineer and manager at Microsoft, but of interest here is his lifelogging. In a fight against natural memory deterioration, Gordon Bell has kept a digital "surrogate memory" to supplement his own memory. "Why should any memory fade when there are technological solutions that can preserve it?" His version of lifelogging includes wearing a SenseCam around his neck that captures everything he sees on a daily basis. He also wears a digital voice recorder to capture the sound he hears. Bell also scans what he reads onto his computer and records his phone calls. He has digitized all of his photos, engineer notebooks, even logos on T-shirts. At any given moment, with the help of his custom developed search engine, Bell has access to anything he has seen, heard, or read in the past decade.

Morris Villarroel, a professor of animal behavior at the Polytechnic University of Madrid, is another lifelogger. His version of lifelong includes a Narrative Clip camera strapped to his chest that shoots about 1,200 photos per day at 30-second intervals. When asked about why he lifelogs, Villaroel responds, "It's nice for me that I have a whole series of photos, moments, that I can look back on, and maybe even share in the future. For example, I have a son who is 11 months old, and he has pictures of his mother, pregnant with him, hundreds of photos of himself the day he was born, and every day thereafter. I imagine him growing old, being 80 and deciding one day to look at a photo of how his mother looked when she was eight months pregnant, what we were doing when he was 120 days old, and how our life was. That motivates me to continue for a long time."

== See also ==
- Intelligence amplification
- Memex

For the use of the term 'external memory' in computing instead of psychology, see:

- Auxiliary memory
- External storage
- National memory
- The Extended Mind
