= Linda Argote =

American academic

Academic background
- Education: Tulane University; University of Michigan (PhD)
- Thesis: Input uncertainty and organizational problem solving in hospital emergency service units (1979)

Linda Marie Argote is an American academic specializing in industrial and organizational psychology. She is Thomas Lord Professor of Organizational Behavior and Theory in the Tepper School of Business at Carnegie Mellon University, where she directs the Center of Organizational Learning, Innovation and Knowledge.

In 2023, Argote was elected a Fellow of the American Association for the Advancement of Science (AAAS). Argote served as the senior associate dean for faculty and research at the Tepper School from 2020-2022.

Argote has courtesy appointments at the Heinz College and the Department of Social and Decision Sciences at Carnegie Mellon University. In 2026, Argote was named a University Professor at Carnegie Mellon University.

== Education and career ==
Argote graduated in 1975 with magna cum laude honors from Tulane University, majoring in psychology. She completed her Ph.D. in organizational psychology at the University of Michigan in 1979, and in the same year joined the Carnegie Mellon University faculty. She has also held a faculty appointment at Northwestern University and was a visiting scholar at Stanford University, the University of Pittsburgh’s Learning Research and Development Center, and Aarhus University. She was the Montzemolo Visiting Professor at Judge Business School of the University of Cambridge, where she was also a visiting fellow at Sidney Sussex College.

Argote published in the field of organizational learning and knowledge transfer. Her research involves how groups and organizations learn, how they retain the knowledge that they acquire and how they transfer it within and between organizational units. She and her coauthors conducted a series of studies aimed at understanding the variation observed in rates of learning in firms. A particular focus of this work was knowledge transfer, or the extent to which lessons learned in one organizational unit transferred to other units. Her article with Eric Darr and Dennis Epple, “The Acquisition, Transfer and Depreciation of Knowledge in Service Organizations: Productivity in Franchises,” was recognized as one of the most influential articles published in Management Science during its first 50 years. Argote reviewed research on knowledge transfer and provided a framework for predicting when knowledge transfer is likely to be successful in the Annual Review of Psychology in 2024. With Ray Reagans and Daria Brooks, Argote examined organizational learning curves for hospital surgical procedures and determined the contribution of the experience of individual team members, of the experience team members acquired working together and of the experience of the hospital towards organizational learning.

In collaboration with Paul Ingram, Argote developed the implications of knowledge transfer, or learning from the experience of others, for firm competitive advantage. Their article, “Knowledge Transfer in Organizations: A Basis for Competitive Advantage in Firms,” was recognized as one of the most influential articles published in Organizational Behavior and Human Decision Processes during its first 50 years.

Argote and Richard Moreland conducted a series of experiments on the concept of transactive memory, or knowledge of who knows what. An initial study found that groups with strong transactive memories recalled more and performed better on a subsequent task than groups with weak transactive memories. Transactive memories have also been found to foster innovation and be especially valuable on non-routine or uncertain tasks. Ren and Argote (2011) reviewed the literature on transactive memory. Argote and Ren (2012) developed a framework characterizing how transactive memory provides micro foundations for dynamic capabilities in firms.

Argote and her colleagues have investigated factors in addition to transactive memory that provide micro foundations for organizational learning, memory and knowledge transfer. These factors include communication networks, work group structure, member turnover, social identity, and emotion.

Argote and Levine (2020) integrated research at the organizational level with more micro studies at the group level in the Oxford Handbook of Group and Organizational Learning. Argote and Miron-Spektor (2011) developed a theoretical framework for analyzing organizational learning. Argote, Lee and Park (2021) reviewed the literature on organizational learning and its subprocesses of search and knowledge creation, retention and transfer.

Argote synthesized her work and related research in Organizational Learning: Creating, Retaining and Transferring Knowledge (Kluwer, 1999; 2nd ed, Springer, 2013). Her book was a finalist for the George R. Terry Book Award of the Academy of Management.

She was the editor-in-chief of the journal Organization Science from 2004 to 2010. She also served as departmental editor at Management Science (1995-2002).

== Recognition ==
Argote became David M. Kirr and Barbara A. Kirr Professor in 1997.

She is a Fellow of the following academic associations:

- American Association for the Advancement of Science (AAAS) (elected 2023)
- Association for Psychological Science (elected 2006). Full list of APS Fellows.
- Institute for Operations Research and the Management Sciences (2008 class)
- Academy of Management (elected 2013)

In 2018 the Interdisciplinary Network for Group Research gave her their Joseph E. McGrath Award for Lifetime Achievement in the Study of Groups.

Distinguished Scholar, Technology Management Section (TMS) Division of the Academy of Management

Distinguished Speaker Award, Technology Management, Institute for Operations Research and the Management Sciences (INFORMS), 2011

Distinguished Scholar, Organization and Management Theory Division of the Academy of Management (OMT) 2012 Distinguished Scholar, Knowledge and Innovation Interest Group, Strategic Management Society, 2013

Honorary doctorate, Aarhus University, 2019

Honorary doctorate, Universita della Svizzera Italiana, 2020

== Selected publications ==
- Argote, L. (2024). Knowledge transfer within organizations: Mechanisms, motivation and consideration. Annual Review of Psychology, 75(1), 405-431.
- Argote, L., & Ingram, P. (2000). Knowledge transfer: A basis for competitive advantage in firms. Organizational behavior and human decision processes, 82(1), 150-169. https://doi.org/10.1006/obhd.2000.2893
- Argote, L. (2012). Organizational learning: Creating, retaining and transferring knowledge. Springer Science & Business Media.
- Argote, L., McEvily, B., & Reagans, R. (2003). Managing knowledge in organizations: An integrative framework and review of emerging themes. Management science, 49(4), 571-582. https://doi.org/10.1287/mnsc.49.4.571.14424
- Argote, L., & Miron-Spektor, E. (2011). Organizational learning: From experience to knowledge. Organization science, 22(5), 1123-1137. https://doi.org/10.1287/orsc.1100.0621
