= Garth Saloner =

South African-born American economist

9th Dean of Stanford Graduate School of Business
- In office September 1, 2009 – August 31, 2016
- President: John L. Hennessy
- Preceded by: Robert L. Joss
- Succeeded by: Jonathan Levin

Personal details
- Born: c. 1955
- Spouse: Marlene Saloner (died 2012)
- Education: University of the Witwatersrand (BCom, MBA); Stanford University (MA, MS, PhD)
- Occupation: professor, academic administrator

Garth Saloner (born c. 1955) is a South African-born American economist. He is the John H. Scully Professor of Leadership, Management and International Business at the Stanford Graduate School of Business, where he was the dean from 2009 to 2016.

== Early life ==
Garth Saloner was born in South Africa circa 1955. He grew up in a Jewish family under apartheid.

Saloner graduated from the University of the Witwatersrand, where he earned a bachelor of commerce in 1975 and a master in business administration in 1977. He emigrated to the United States to avoid doing his military service in the South African Defence Force. Instead, he attended Stanford University, where he earned a master of arts degree in Economics in 1981, and a master of science in Statistics and PhD in Economics in 1982.

== Career ==
Saloner was an assistant professor at the Massachusetts Institute of Technology from 1982 to 1987, and a tenured associate professor from 1987 to 1990. During that time, he was also a visiting assistant professor at the Stanford Graduate School of Business from 1986 to 1987, and a visiting associate professor the Harvard Business School from 1989 to 1990. He was a full professor at the MIT Sloan School of Management in 1990, when joined the Stanford Graduate School of Management as a professor of Strategic Management and Economics until 1992. He was the Robert A. Magowan Professor of Economics and Strategic Management from 1992 to 2001, and the Jeffrey S. Skoll Professor of Electronic Commerce, Strategic Management, and Economics from 2000 to 2009. He was the Philip H. Knight Professor from 2009 to 2016, when he became the John H. Scully Professor of Leadership, Management and International Business.

Saloner was the dean of the Stanford Graduate School of Business from 2009 to 2016. During his tenure, he led a $500 million fundraising campaign. He also built a new dorm, and Stanford became the highest-ranked business school in the world, ahead of Harvard Business School and the Wharton School of the University of Pennsylvania. He stepped down in the wake of a lawsuit on allegations of discrimination on the basis of marital status, race and gender filed by Professor James Phills. He was succeeded by Jonathan Levin.

Saloner has published research on business networks at start-up technology companies. He is the co-author of two books. His research has been published in academic journals like The RAND Journal of Economics and the American Economic Review.

== Personal life ==
Saloner had a wife, Marlene, who died of cancer in 2012. Some time after, he began a romantic relationship with Deborah H. Gruenfeld, a professor at the Stanford Graduate School of Business where he was dean. Gruenfeld was separated from another professor at the school, James Phills.

== Works ==
- Podolny, Joel; Saloner, Garth; Shepard, Andrea (2001). Strategic Management. New York: Wiley. ISBN 9780470009475.
- Saloner, Garth; Spence, A. Michael (2002). Creating and Capturing Value: Perspectives and Cases on Electronic Commerce. New York: Wiley. ISBN 9780471410157. OCLC 46976639.
