= Transactive memory =

Psychological hypothesis proposed by Daniel Wegner

Transactive memory is a psychological hypothesis first proposed by Daniel Wegner in 1985 as a response to earlier theories of "group mind" such as groupthink. A transactive memory system is a mechanism through which groups collectively encode, store, and retrieve knowledge. Transactive memory was initially studied in couples and families where individuals had close relationships but was later extended to teams, larger groups, and organizations to explain how they develop a "group mind", a memory system that is more complex and potentially more effective than that of any of its individual constituents. A transactive memory system includes memory stored in each individual, the interactions between memory within the individuals, as well as the processes that update this memory. Transactive memory, then, is the shared store of knowledge.

According to Wegner, a transactive memory system consists of the knowledge stored in each individual's memory combined with metamemory containing information regarding the different teammate's domains of expertise. The transactive memory system works similarly to external memory, where other members of the group are the external memory aid. Just as an individual's metamemory allows them to be aware of what information is available for retrieval, so does the transactive memory system provide teammates with information regarding the knowledge they have access to within the group. Group members learn who knowledge experts are and how to access expertise through communicative processes. In this way, a transactive memory system can provide the group members with more and better knowledge than any individual could access on their own.

== History ==
Transactive memory was first envisioned by Daniel Wegner in 1985. This concept proposed that when two individuals spend a lot of time around each other and work together, they create a shared store of knowledge between the members. In essence, one member of the couple could store information within their partner and then recall that information by asking their partner about it. This concept was different and unique from other descriptions of socially distributed cognition in that it describes a situation where individuals hold different knowledge compared to shared information, and members of the group engage in transactions to assist in recall of the stored information. In a recent review, Ren and Argote described transactive memory as existing of both a structural component (the linkages of individual memory to the collective) and transactive processes that make the transactive memory dynamic. Wegner first proposed these three processes which occur in groups that lead to the formation and reification of transactive memory: encoding, storage, and retrieval described more below. In a series of experiments, Hollingshead found that romantic partners (who are assumed to have transactive memory) performed better on knowledge recall than dyads and that couples will memorize more words in a list than two strangers when they are rewarded on number of unique words you recall. The explanation for these findings are that couples know how best to remind each other of the knowledge they have, and that couples have a good conception of the other's knowledge and will therefore avoid memorizing words within their partner's domain. Strangers don't have access to this same shared information which leads to poorer performance in these kinds of tasks. Transactive memory was further extended by Diane Liang and colleagues into the realm of work groups. In this work, the development of transactive memory was conceived of as a way to improve group's performance when engaging in interdependent tasks. After this extension, transactive memory became more prolific in organizational behavior among other disciplines.

== Transactive processes ==
Just like human memory, the development of a transactive memory system involves three stages: encoding, storage and retrieval. These processes are transactive, meaning that they are updated as members exchange information with one another.

=== Encoding ===
In the encoding stage, the teammates gain information on the other team members' domains of knowledge and categorize it by ascribing each knowledge domain to the corresponding team member. Sometimes, this acquaintance can emerge through "who did what" or "who knows what" conversation, or even through direct instruction such as by telling a teammate to remember certain information. There may also be discussion and negotiation of where and in what form to store information in the group.

The encoding process is very important in the development of transactive memory. Encoding occurs through interaction between teammates: through sharing knowledge and seeking information from other team members, teammates learn the expertise of each team member as a first essential step towards specialization. These experts then are responsible for continuing to encode new and relevant information in their domains of knowledge.

=== Storage ===
In the storage stage, the relevant information is stored in the possession of the team member, or members, with the corresponding expertise; once the experts have been identified, new information is transmitted directly to those team members. This improves the learning process and reduces the load on the memory of individual teammates. With transactive memory storage, a team member only has to remember the information in their domain of expertise, while they only have to remember what the other members' domains of expertise are rather than storing all the information in the transactive memory.

Information may be also lost or modified during storage for transitive memory, as is the case in individual memory. These modifications, however, may be even more rapid and impactful than in individual memory because the information is scattered and stored with multiple members in the group, making the information more readily replaced with misinformation.

=== Retrieval ===
During the retrieval stage, a group member uses the developed transactive memory to identify a group member that specializes in the required knowledge area and then turns to that member to attain the knowledge. If the inquiring member has not encoded in their individual metamemory who specializes in the knowledge, retrieval can be initiated by asking other members in the storage system for who the expert who specializes in the information they want to retrieve is, then connecting with that expert after a series of consultations. If this information is accurate and useful, the linkage to the member with specialized knowledge is strengthened. If the information is not accurate, then the encoding stage is entered into again such that information about the inaccuracy of the knowledge the specialized member provided is re-encoded and stored in the transactive memory system.

== Development ==
Much research has shown that a transactive memory system is primarily developed through interactions between team members. Training on the task that a group is expected to do together has been shown to assist in the development of a transactive memory system. In this study, when the group members were trained together, the team developed a stronger transactive memory system, recalled more information about the process, and made fewer errors compared to teams where individuals had gone through the same training but separately. The researchers concluded that the interactions that took place during the joint training allowed the team members to develop an understanding of their teammates' skills, assisted their search for relevant information about the task from their teammates, and assess the accuracy and reliability of this information. As a result, groups that trained together performed better in the task. In a later study, these same researchers also determined that familiarity with their teammates or liking didn't explain the differences between groups that were trained together and those that were not. In this study, the researchers gave the groups that didn't train together a team building exercise but they still did not do as well as the trained together group.

Furthermore, research has shown that the knowledge about who knows what can be available before the team processes. At the first stage in a group's life cycle, knowing each of the team members' expertise allows the group to distribute work in a more efficient way and allocate different assignments to team members that are the most qualified for these assignments. The existence of many interactions in the early stages of group formation provides each of the teammates the opportunity to get to know other team members' training, level of expertise or the lack of knowledge in certain areas, and develop a shared understanding of the task's requirements and the way that the total of the teammates knowledge combines.

Hence, it seems that communication serves as a crucial component in the development of transactive memory. Yet, it seems that not any kind of communication and interaction between team members will bring to the construction of transactive memory. Communication, in general serves as a way of transferring information from one person to another, but for the purpose of transactive memory construction this communication must deal with information regarding the knowledge, expertise and relevant experience of other individuals in the system. If the team members communicate more face to face while planning a project the TMS will emerge faster and will be stronger. The level of face to face communication while the team is planning could predict implementation-phase TMS.

Moreland & Myaskovsky (2000) showed that transactive memory can be developed without any interaction between teammates. As a substitute to teammates' communication they provided group members feedback ranking team members' skills in the relevant task domains before they started performing the task. Although the feedback and the information regarding teammates knowledge was provided by the researchers and teammates did not communicate with each other beforehand, this information positively affected the team's transactive memory score and performance. This experiment demonstrated that the sharing specific information regarding team members' knowledge and domains of expertise formation is necessary for transactive memory development, either through direct interaction or by another means of information transformation.

== Indicators ==
Many researchers consider the basic components of transactive memory system to be specialization, coordination and credibility. This is a common misconception of how transactive memory systems operate within groups. These indicators of TMS occur after a group has established a transactive memory system and are due to the existence of transactive memory within the group. Because these three factors occur more prevalently in groups that have developed a TMS, they are often measured as a proxy for measuring the exact transactive memory system. The most prevalent measure of transactive memory as developed by Kyle Lewis measures these three components as indicators that a group has developed a transactive memory. Other measures, namely Austin's attempts to measure the perceptions of expertise within the group as a more direct measure of transactive memory.

=== Specialization ===
A strong transactive memory system is achieved when the group gains information about the knowledge repertoire that all other teammates hold and use this information in order to acquire different complementary knowledge. Once members within the group have a good understanding of who knows what within the group, they can begin to differentiate in their knowledge. This differentiation of knowledge is where the real benefit of a transactive memory system is enacted because, with less overlap in member's areas of expertise, distribution of labor becomes easier and the group can become more efficient (Wegner 1987). When each team member can deepen his knowledge in any areas that are lacking (as opposed to acquiring congruent knowledge) they will enlarge the teams' total collective knowledge. Hollingshead (1998a) demonstrated that specialization lead to a more efficient and organized effort investment in information retrieval, prevention of information redundancy and supplied accessibility to larger range of expertise.

=== Coordination ===
Coordination refers to the extent of necessity in explicit revealed planning and coordinating efforts during teamwork. When a group possesses a strong transactive memory system, the need for explicit coordination efforts reduces since teammates are aware of other teammates strengths and weaknesses, can anticipate their behavior and responds, and make quick adjustments of their own behavior in return. In groups that have developed a transactive memory, members are able to easily coordinate with one another and can go directly to those with expertise if they need their information.

=== Credibility ===
'Credibility' reflects the extent to which the team members believe that the relevant task knowledge possessed by any of the other team members is correct and accurate. When groups that developed a transactive memory system, they will have gone through the encoding, storing, retrieval process several times for information. As new information is brought to the group's attention it can be evaluated and then reencoded into the transactive memory system. If a member's area of expertise has been used several times without issue, then other group members will begin to see the group member's knowledge as more credible (Wegner 1987). If a group has a well-developed transactive memory system, all members within the group would be seen as credible.

== Team performance ==
The existence of a transactive memory system within a group allows for quick access to a large amount of knowledge, improving information integration processes, improving decision making processes, influencing the perception of efficiency of other teammates, and increasing their satisfaction and sense of identification with the team and the organization. Transactive memory is composed of specialized knowledge and understanding of who has that knowledge, but benefits are not limited to just groups that engage in a lot of knowledge work.

Transactive memory may enhance performance through three major mechanisms:

- Division of the responsibility on different kinds of knowledge across the teammates allows each one of them to broaden his own knowledge in a specific area while maintaining access to relevant required task knowledge possessed by others.
- Developing transactive memory system will shorten the time needed for seeking the appropriate knowledge: when each team member knows whom to turn to for the required information, less time is wasted in search for relevant task knowledge.
- The shared understanding of the teammates regarding the interpersonal relations in the team and the different expertise domains, enables them to better predict and anticipate how their team colleagues would behave, leading to well coordinated and efficient interactions.

Transactive memory may not be helpful for all kinds of groups or all kinds of work. Lewis and Herndon (2011) suggested criteria for kinds of tasks that a developed transactive memory system will be the most helpful in improving the performance of.

- Tasks that require diverse knowledge.
- Tasks that require a deep understanding of specialized knowledge.
- Tasks where the credibility and accuracy of information is important.
- Tasks where it is possible to know which members possess expertise.
- Tasks that require a complete application of knowledge to the task.
- Tasks where efficient coordination between members is important.

For these reasons, groups performing tasks that can't be broken apart or require little specialization may not get much benefit out of the development of a transactive memory system. The authors suggest that tasks where ideas have to be executed and all members have the same goal will benefit the most from a transactive memory system. Conversely the authors suggest that groups that engage in brainstorming or decision tasks may develop transactive memory systems faster than those merely executing ideas because there is more knowledge sharing and interaction between members.

== Extensions to other domains ==
When transactive memory was first envisioned, the authors were describing an external memory store within other people. They did acknowledge that we often store information within objects such as notebooks, books, or other recordings. These objects are static and transactive processes cannot occur. These objects, therefore, cannot cue memories within individuals in the same way another person could. The Internet, however, is much more dynamic than a book and individuals can engage in similar transactive processes as they would with other individuals. Research published in the journal Science on 14 July 2011 suggests that when people expect to have future access to information, they have lower rates of recall of the information, but higher rates of recall of the sources of the information. The authors suggest that this research demonstrates that individuals are developing a transactive memory system with the Internet, relying on it for information instead of internalizing it within their own memories. To explain how external memory stores are related to transactive memory systems, Schakel (2013) described them as external artifacts which may either (be used to) influence or represent the ostensive or performative aspects of transactive memory systems.
