= Journal of Marketing Education =

- Discipline: Marketing education
- Language: English
- Edited by: Donald R. Bacon

Publication details
- History: 1979-present
- Publisher: SAGE Publications
- Frequency: Triannually
- Impact factor: (2010)

Standard abbreviations
- ISO 4: J. Mark. Educ.

Indexing
- ISSN: 0273-4753
- LCCN: 82646049
- OCLC no.: 300178895

Links
- Journal homepage; Online access; Online archive

The Journal of Marketing Education is a triannual peer-reviewed academic journal that publishes papers on marketing education. It is a member of the Committee on Publication Ethics (COPE) and committed to ethical practices in publishing. The editor-in-chief is Donald R. Bacon (Boise State University). It was established in 1979 and is currently published by SAGE Publications.

== Abstracting and indexing ==
The journal is abstracted and indexed in:

- ABI/INFORM
- Business Source Complete
- Scopus
- SocINDEX
- ZETOC
- SCImago Journal Rank
