= Joseph E. McGrath =

American psychologist (1927-2007)

Joseph Edward McGrath (July 17, 1927 – April 1, 2007) was an American social psychologist, known for his work on small groups, time, stress, and research methods.

== Biography ==
McGrath was born in DuBois, Pennsylvania, the last child of six. He served the U.S. Army from 1945 to 1946. He received a B.S. and an M.A. in Psychology at the University of Maryland in 1950 and 1951, respectively.

He married Marion Freitag in 1952. They had four children. In 1955 McGrath completed a Ph.D. in Social Psychology at the University of Michigan with thesis adviser Theodore M. Newcomb. Upon graduation, McGrath became research scientist and project director of Psychological Research Associates in Arlington, Virginia for two years, and then vice president of Human Sciences Research, Inc. in McLean, Virginia for three years. In 1960, McGrath accepted a visiting position in the Department of Psychology at the University of Illinois as research assistant professor and associate director of the Group Effectiveness Laboratory. In 1962, he received a tenure track appointment there as assistant professor. He was tenured as an associate professor in 1964 and promoted to full professor in 1966. McGrath served as head of the Psychology Department for five years, from 1971 to 1976. He became a professor emeritus in 1997 and remained active in his research and collaborations until his death in 2007.

== Teaching ==
McGrath mentored dozens of students and young scholars throughout his career, including Deborah Gruenfeld and Linda Argote.

== Group dynamics ==
McGrath's work in group dynamics included the classification of group tasks into four basic goals. They are generating, choosing, negotiating and executing. McGrath further sub-divided these four creating 8 types of tasks. Type 1 is generating plans (planning tasks); type 2 is generating ideas (creativity tasks); type 3 is solving problems with correct answers (intellective tasks); type 4 is deciding issues with no right answer (decision making tasks); type 5 is resolving conflicts of view point (cognitive conflict tasks); type 6 is resolving conflicts of interest (mixed motive tasks); type 7 is resolving conflicts of power (contests, battles and competitive tasks); and type 8 is executing performance tasks (performances, psycho-motor tasks). McGrath created a circumplex depicting these eight tasks in quadrants which indicated each type of task as either conflict or cooperation and as either conceptual or behavioral. Creativity and Intellective tasks (types 2 and 3) were in the cooperation and conceptual quadrant. Decision-making tasks and cognitive conflict tasks (types 4 and 5) were in the conflict and conceptual quadrant. Mixed-motive tasks and contests/battles/competitive tasks (types 6 and 7) were in the conflict and behavioral quadrant. Performances/psycho-motor tasks and planning tasks (types 8 and 1) were in the cooperation and behavioral quadrant.

McGrath's circumplex of group tasks is referenced by Donelson R. Forsyth in his book Group Dynamics where he notes that while only one of McGrath's sub-groups of tasks may be utilized by some groups, there are groups that will perform tasks from multiple sub-groups of tasks. Groups focused only on generating goals are working towards creating new methods or using existing methods to achieve their goals while groups focused on choosing goals are deciding on a correct course of action or what they deem the best course of action from among various options. Groups focused on negotiating goals are working to resolve differences or competitive disputes and groups focused on executing are competing against other groups or performing. There are groups that will have mixed goals from the various types.

== Service to the profession ==
- President of the Society for the Psychological Study of Social Issues (SPSSI; Division 9 of the American Psychological Association), 1985–1986.
- Executive Council (1979–1982) and Secretary-Treasurer (1980–83) of the [hSociety of Experimental Social Psychology (SESP).
- Editor, Journal of Social Issues, 1977–1983.
- Co-Editor for North America, Time and Society, 1991–1997.
- Consulting Editor (Masthead): Journal of Applied Psychology (1970–1975) and Journal of Personality and Social Psychology, Interpersonal Relations and Group Processes Section (1980–2007).
- Editorial Advisory Board: Journal of Social Issues (1983–1992); Applied Social Psychology Annual (1986–1990); American Behavioral Scientist (1989–2007); Small Group Research (1992–2007); and Group Dynamics: Theory, Research and Practice.

== Books ==
- McGrath, J. E. (1964). Social Psychology: A Brief Introduction. New York: Holt, Rinehart & Winston.
- McGrath, J. E., & Altman, I. (1966). Small Group Research: A Synthesis and Critique of the Field. New York: Holt, Rinehart & Winston.
- Runkel, P. J. & McGrath, J. E. (1972). Research on Human Behavior: A Systematic Guide. New York: Holt, Rinehart & Winston.
- McGrath, J. E. Martin, J., & Kulka, R. A. (1982). Judgment Calls in Research. Beverly Hills, CA: SAGE Publications Inc.
- McGrath, J. E. (1984). Groups: Interaction and Performance. Inglewood, N. J.: Prentice Hall, Inc.
- Brinberg, D. & McGrath, J. E. (1985). Validity and the Research Process. Beverly Hills, CA: SAGE Publishing Co.
- McGrath, J. E. & Kelly, J. R. (1986). Time and Human Interaction: Toward a Social Psychology of Time. New York: Guilford Publications, Inc.
- Kelly, J. R. & McGrath, J. E. (1988). On Time and Method. Newbury Park, CA: SAGE Publishing Co.
- McGrath, J. E. & Hollingshead, A. B. (1994). Groups Interacting with Technology: Ideas, Issues, Evidence, and an Agenda. Newbury Park, CA: SAGE Publications.
- Arrow, H., McGrath, J. E. & Berdahl, J. L. (2000). Small Groups as Complex, Systems: Formation, Coordination, Development, and Adaptation. Thousand Oaks, CA: SAGE Publishing Co.
- McGrath, J. E. & Tschan, F. (2004). Temporal Matters in Social Psychology: Examining the role of time in the lives of groups and individuals. Washington DC: APA Publications.
