= Resemblance (fiqh) =

Term in Islamic jurisprudence

In Islamic jurisprudence, resemblance (Arabic: مُشَابَهَة) refers to the principle that Muslims should avoid imitating the blameworthy practices of non-Muslims or other groups.

== Categories ==
According to Shafi‘i, Ahmad ibn Hanbal, Ibn al-Madini, Abu Dawud and al-Daraqutni, human actions and so resemblance are classified into three types:

- Natural (intrinsic/innate acts), such as eating, drinking, sleeping, resemblance does not apply to these.
- Customary acts, such as eating habits or clothing, resemblance in these may be prohibited.
- Voluntary acts, such as marriage or sources of livelihood, resemblance can also apply to these.

== Rulings ==
According to a hadith (Sunan Abi Dawud 4031), "مَنْ تَشَبَّهَ بِقَوْمٍ فَهُوَ مِنْهُمْ" — "Whoever imitates a people is one of them."Imitating non-Muslims in religious matters, beliefs, or essential religious practices can lead to disbelief, such as worshipping idols or celestial bodies, disrespecting a prophet, the Holy Quran or the Holy Kabah, or belittling a Sunnah. Some acts are considered signs of disbelief, such as wearing a zunnar (belt), a specific hat or marking the forehead like non-Muslims. Those who commit these acts are considered disbelievers, and they must reconvert to Islam and renew their marriage contracts. Such acts, whether wearing a belt or a specific hat, are considered disbelief. Placing a specific hat on the head and saying "the heart should be upright" is also disbelief as it involves denial of the apparent rulings of Sharia. Insulting religious scholars without reason is also disbelief, such as seating a scholar on a pulpit and mocking or striking with a pillow. Imitating or mocking scholars with the intention of disrespecting the inheritors of prophets constitutes disbelief, and if a person contemptuously calls a scholar “Awalim” or “Alavi,” they become a disbeliever.
