= Helen Spencer-Oatey =

British linguist and psychologist (born 1952)

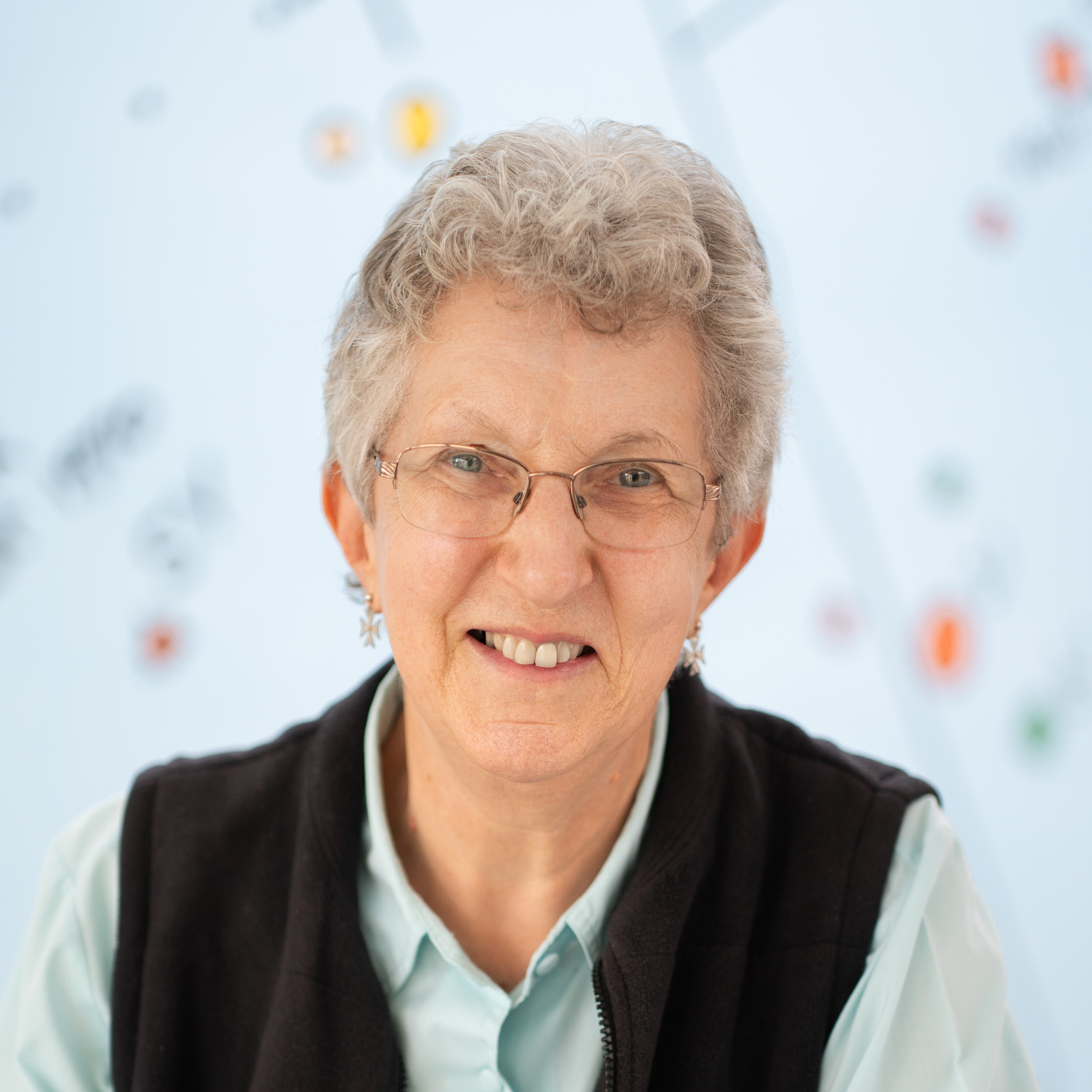
- Helen Spencer-Oatey in 2024
- Born: 23 March 1952 (age 74)
- Citizenship: British
- Education: BA Hons. Psychology (University of Durham) MEd (University of Wales) PhD (Dept of Linguistics & English Language, Lancaster University)
- Organization: University of Warwick

Helen Spencer-Oatey (born 23 March 1952) is a British applied linguist and social psychologist. She is an emeritus professor at the University of Warwick.

== Academic career ==
After studying psychology at the University of Durham, Spencer-Oatey moved to Hong Kong and later to Shanghai, where she taught at Shanghai Jiaotong University. While there, she experienced how closely interconnected language and culture are, and how misunderstandings can easily occur. This formed the foundation for her ongoing interest and research into intercultural communication and rapport management. On her return to the UK, she completed a PhD at Lancaster University and later set up the first masters degree in the UK on intercultural communication at the University of Luton (now Bedfordshire). In 2002 she became manager for HEFCE of their £4M Sino-UK e-Learning Programme, after which she took up the post of Director of Applied Linguistics at the University of Warwick.

Spencer-Oatey researches and publishes on rapport and workplace relationships, as well as intercultural communication and intercultural competence. She has developed a range of resources and tools for professionals on these topics. She retired in 2020.

== Recognition ==
In 2023, the book Negotiating Intercultural Relations was dedicated to Spencer-Oatey for her interdisciplinary work in the field.

== Selected works ==
=== Books ===
- —; Lazidou, Domna (2024). Making Working Relationships Work: The TRIPS Toolkit for Handling Relationship Challenges and Promoting Rapport. Melbourne: Castledown. ISBN 978-0-6481844-6-1. OCLC 1461855567.
- Spencer-Oatey, H., Franklin, P. and Lazidou, D. (2022) Global Fitness for Global People: How to manage and leverage cultural diversity at work. Melbourne: Castledown. ISBN 978-0-6481844-6-1.
- Spencer-Oatey, H. and Kádár, D. (2021) Intercultural Politeness. Managing Relations across Cultures. Cambridge: Cambridge University Press. ISBN 978-1-107-17622-5
- Jordans, E., Ngweno, B., and Spencer-Oatey, H. (2020) Developing Global Leaders: African Case Studies. New York: Palgrave. ISBN 978-3-030-14605-4
- Spencer-Oatey, H. and Franklin, P. (2009) Intercultural Interaction: A Multidisciplinary Approach to Intercultural Communication. Basingstoke: Palgrave. ISBN 978-1-4039-8631-3
- Spencer-Oatey, H. (ed) (2008) Culturally Speaking. Culture, Communication and Politeness. London: Continuum. (2nd edition) ISBN 978-0-8264-9310-1
- Kotthoff, H. & Spencer-Oatey, H. (eds.) (2007) Handbook of Intercultural Communication. [ Vol.7 of Handbooks of Applied Linguistics ]. Berlin: Mouton de Gruyter. ISBN 978-3-11-018471-6
- Spencer-Oatey, H. (ed) (2007) e-Learning Initiatives in China: Pedagogy, Policy and Culture. Hong Kong: Hong Kong University Press and the Wah Ching Centre of Research on Education in China. ISBN 978-962-209-868-8
- Spencer-Oatey, H. (ed) (2000) Culturally Speaking: Managing Rapport through Talk across Cultures. London: Continuum. [Reprinted several times; Japanese translation version published in 2004; published under licence in China in 2006] ISBN 0-304-70437-7
- Oatey, H. (1987) The Customs and Language of Social Interaction in English. Shanghai, China: Shanghai Foreign Language Education Press. ISBN 7-81009-173-5

=== Encyclopedia & Handbook articles ===
- Spencer-Oatey, H. & McConachy, T. (2024) Cultural schemas, evaluation and the socio-moral order. In: A. Korangy (ed.) Handbook of Cultural Linguistics (pp.91–107). Springer. ISBN 978-981-99-3799-8
- Stadler, S., Işık-Güler, H. & Spencer-Oatey, H. (2023) Intercultural discourse: identity perspectives on business interaction. In Handford, M. & Gee, J.P (eds), The Routledge Handbook of Discourse Analysis (pp.625–638). Abingdon, Oxon.: Routledge. ISBN 978-0-367-47383-9
- Spencer-Oatey, H. Politeness and rapport management. (2022) In I. Kecskes (Ed.), The Cambridge Handbook of Intercultural Pragmatics (pp. 484–509). Cambridge, UK: Cambridge University Press. ISBN 978-1-108-83953-2
- Debray, C. & Spencer-Oatey, H. (2021) Discourse and intercultural communication. In K. Hyland, B. Paltridge & L. Wong (eds). Bloomsbury Handbook of Discourse Analysis. 2nd ed. London: Bloomsbury. ISBN 978-1-350-15608-1
- McConachy, T. & Spencer-Oatey, H. (2021) Cross-cultural and intercultural pragmatics. In M. Haugh, D. Kádár, & M. Terkourafi (Eds.) The Cambridge Handbook of Sociopragmatics, Cambridge: Cambridge University Press. ISBN 978-1-108-84496-3
- Spencer-Oatey, H. & Debray, C. (2020) Linguistically and culturally diverse project partnerships and teams. In J. Jackson (Ed.) The Routledge Handbook of Language and Intercultural Communication. 2nd edition. London: Routledge, pp.487–502. ISBN 978-1-138-38945-8
- Franklin, P. & Spencer-Oatey, H. (2019) Developing intercultural interaction competence in organisations. In S. Habscheid, A. Müller, B. Thörle, & A. Wilton (Eds.) Handbuch Sprache in Organisationen. Berlin: De Gruyter, pp. 403–423. ISBN 978-3-11-029623-5
- Spencer-Oatey, H. and Dauber, D. (2018) Internationalizing the student experience. In: Teixeira, P.N. and Shin, J-C. (General editors), Encyclopedia of International Higher Education Systems and Institutions, sub-section Higher Education as a Global Reality (sub-section editors: De Wit, H., Rumbley, L., Hunter, F.). Springer. ISBN 978-94-017-8904-2
- Spencer-Oatey, H. & Zegarac, V. (2017) Power, solidarity and (im)politeness. In: J. Culpeper, M. Haugh & D.Kadar (eds.) The Palgrave Handbook of Linguistic (Im)Politeness. Basingstoke: Palgrave Macmillan, pp.119–141. ISBN 978-1-137-37507-0
- Spencer-Oatey, H. and Wang, J. (2017) Intercultural pragmatics. In: Sybesma, R. (Ed.) Encyclopedia of Chinese Language and Linguistics, Vol. 2 (pp.441–445). Leiden: Brill. ISBN 978-1-350-15608-1
- Spencer-Oatey, H. (2015) Politeness and rapport management. In: Bennett, J. (ed.) The Sage Encyclopedia of Intercultural Competence. Thousand Oaks: Sage. ISBN 978-1-4522-4428-0
- Spencer-Oatey, H. (2015) Rapport management. In: Tracey, K. (ed.) The International Encyclopedia of Language and Social Interaction. London: Wiley. ISBN 978-1-118-61110-4
