= Daniel Wegner =

American psychologist (1948–2013)

- Born: June 28, 1948; Calgary, Alberta, Canada
- Died: July 5, 2013 (aged 65); Winchester, Massachusetts, United States
- Education: Michigan State University
- Known for: Ironic process theory, transactive memory, experimental study of free will
- Scientific career
- Fields: Social Psychology
- Workplaces: Harvard University, Trinity University, University of Virginia

Daniel Merton Wegner (June 28, 1948 – July 5, 2013) was an American social psychologist. He was a professor of psychology at Harvard University, Trinity University, and a fellow of both the American Association for the Advancement of Science and the American Academy of Arts and Sciences. He was known for applying experimental psychology to the topics of mental control (for example ironic process theory) and conscious will, and for originating the study of transactive memory and action identification. In The Illusion of Conscious Will and other works, he argued that the human sense of free will is an illusion.

== Early life and education ==
Wegner was born in Calgary, Alberta, Canada.

When Wegner was 11 years old he developed an understanding of two types of scientists: "bumblers, who plod along, only once in a while accomplishing something but enjoying the process even if they often end up being wrong, and the pointers, who do only one thing: point out that the bumblers are bumbling."

He enrolled in a physics degree at Michigan State University but changed to psychology, going on to an M.A. and then a PhD.

== Career ==
After gaining his doctorate in 1974, he spent sixteen years teaching at Trinity University, becoming a full Professor in 1985. From 1990 to 2000, he researched and taught at the University of Virginia, after which he joined the faculty at Harvard University.

=== Awards ===
In 2011, Wegner was awarded the William James Fellow Award by the Association for Psychological Science, the Distinguished Scientific Contribution Award by the American Psychological Association, and the Distinguished Scientist Award by the Society of Experimental Social Psychology. In 2012, he was awarded the Donald T. Campbell Award by the Society for Personality and Social Psychology (SPSP). Furthermore, shortly after Wegner's death in 2013, SPSP announced that its annually awarded Theoretical Innovation Prize would henceforth be known as the Daniel M. Wegner Theoretical Innovation Prize to honor Wegner's memory and his innovative work.

== Research ==
=== Ironic process theory ===
Wegner and colleagues performed a series of experiments in which people tried to suppress thoughts, for example by attempting not to think of a white bear. That work revealed that attempting not to think of a topic often backfires, resulting in high rates of intrusive thoughts about the topic. Wegner coined the term "ironic mental processes" for this effect, which is also known more commonly as the "white bear phenomenon". The effect contributes to various psychological challenges and disorders. Smokers who try not to think about cigarettes find it harder to give up. People who suppress thoughts that may cause an anxiety reaction often make those thoughts more intrusive. Wegner found that the ironic effect is stronger when people are stressed or depressed.

=== The illusion of conscious will ===
Wegner conducted a series of experiments in which people experience an illusion of control, feeling that their will shapes events which are actually determined by someone else. He argued controversially that the ease with which this illusion can be created shows that the everyday feeling of conscious will is an illusion or a "construction" and that this illusion of mental causation is "the mind's best trick". Wegner defined conscious will as a function of priority (the thought must come before the action), consistency (the thought must be consistent with the action), and exclusivity (the thought cannot be accompanied with other causes). He argued that, although people may feel that conscious intentions drive much of their behavior, in reality both behavior and intentions are the product of other, unconscious mental processes. Wegner concluded that his own findings were "compatible with the idea that brain events cause intention and action, whereas conscious intention itself may not cause action".

=== Apparent mental causation ===
Wegner argued that the feeling of intention is something attributed "after the fact" according to three principles: consistency, exclusivity, and priority. The principle of consistency states that if the content of one's thoughts is relevant to one's action, then a feeling of control will occur. The exclusivity principle holds that one must not believe there to be an outside influence or cause to feel as though an action was intended. Finally, the priority principle requires the thought to occur right before the action to produce the illusion of free will.

He did not claim that conscious thought cannot, in principle, cause action, merely that any connection between conscious thought and action should be determined by scientific enquiry, and not by unreliable introspection and feelings.

In later research with Jeffrey Ebert, Wegner found that when an action was consistent with a subsequent event, people were more likely to feel that they had caused the event and to perceive the action and its effect as occurring closer together in time.

=== Transactive memory ===
In 1985, Wegner proposed the concept of transactive memory. A transactive memory system is a system through which groups collectively encode, store, and retrieve knowledge. Transactive memory suggests an analysis not only of how couples and families in close relationships coordinate memory and tasks at home, but how teams, larger groups and organizations come to develop a "group mind", a memory system that is more complex and potentially more effective than that of any of the individuals that comprise it.

According to Wegner, a transactive memory system consists of the knowledge stored in each individual's memory combined with metamemory containing information regarding the different teammate's domains of expertise. Just as the individual's metamemory allows him to be aware of what information is available for retrieval, so does the transactive memory system provide teammates with information regarding the knowledge they have access to within the team. Group members learn who knowledge experts are and how to access expertise through communicative processes. In this way, a transactive memory system can provide the group members with more and better knowledge than any individual could access on his or her own.

== Death ==
Trinity University announced Wegner's death on Friday, July 5, 2013, at his home in Massachusetts, of amyotrophic lateral sclerosis. He was survived by his wife and two daughters.

== Books ==
Author

- Wegner, D. M., & Vallacher, R. R. (1977). Implicit psychology: An introduction to social cognition. New York: Oxford University Press. Japanese translation by Sogensha, 1988. ISBN 0-19-502229-7
- Vallacher, R. R. & Wegner, D. M. (1985). A theory of action identification. Hillsdale, NJ: Lawrence Erlbaum Associates.
- Wegner, D. M. (1989). White bears and other unwanted thoughts: Suppression, obsession, and the psychology of mental control. New York: Viking/Penguin. German translation by Ernst Kabel Verlag, 1992. 1994 Edition, New York: Guilford Press.
- Wegner, Daniel Merton (2002). The Illusion of Conscious Will. MIT Press. ISBN 978-0-262-23222-7.
- Schacter, D. S., Gilbert, D. T., & Wegner, D. M. (2008). Psychology. New York: Worth.
  - Schacter, D. S., Gilbert, D. T., & Wegner, D. M. (2011). Psychology: 2nd Edition. New York: Worth.
- Wegner, D. M., & Gray, K. (2016). The mind club: Who thinks, what feels, and why it matters. New York: Viking.

Editor

- Wegner, D. M., & Vallacher, R. R. (Eds.). (1980). The self in social psychology. New York: Oxford University Press.
- Wegner, D. M., & Pennebaker, J. W. (Eds.) (1993). Handbook of mental control. Englewood Cliffs, NJ: Prentice-Hall.
