= Facial resemblance =

Facial resemblance, where two faces are alike, has been observed to enhance trustworthiness. As reported by an experiment, "resemblance to the subject's own face raised the incidence of trusting a partner". When similarities in appearance are distinguished, trust tends to be established.

== Experiment ==
The facial resemblance experiment utilized digital morphing technology to manipulate and combine the faces of persons unknown to the subject with either the subject's own face or another stranger's face. These faces were used in a "trust game" during which the subject would initially determine how much he or she trusts another individual by the face displayed on a screen, and then give some of the money allotted to him or her by the experimenters to the person on the screen. The subjects were told that the money given to the partner would be tripled, and then the receiving partner would decide how much money to return (though in reality no second partner existed). Subjects were shown the computer generated faces, which were described as "playing partners from different universities", and they were asked to give some of their money to the faces shown to them. How much money a subject offers determines his or her trust in the face presented: more money given means more trust in the partner, while less money given means less trust in the partner. The subjects were asked to act as the receiver of money for several rounds to ensure realism.

== Prosocial behavior ==
Facial resemblance does not only enhance trustworthiness, but also increases the chance of prosocial behavior. One theory is that this prosocial behavior occurs because facial resemblance is a potential cue of kinship. If someone identifies similarities of him/herself in another individual, the tendency to trust is higher.

== Attractiveness ==
Because of the correlation between facial recognition and trustworthiness, further experiments have been conducted to determine if facial resemblance also applies to other social interactions outside of fidelity. One experiment measured the relationship between facial resemblance and attractiveness. The results conclude, "Though an individual may be viewed as more trustworthy, the effects of resemblance on attractiveness are lower." Facial resemblance had no effect on the attractiveness for a long-term relationship with a person. It did however, affect attractiveness for a short-term relationship.
