= Psychology & Marketing =

- November 2020 cover
- Discipline: Marketing; Psychology
- Language: English
- Edited by: Giampaolo Viglia

Publication details
- History: 1984–present
- Publisher: John Wiley & Sons
- Frequency: Monthly
- Impact factor: 5.507 (2021)

Standard abbreviations
- ISO 4: Psychol. Mark.

Indexing
- ISSN: 0742-6046 (print); 1520-6793 (web)
- LCCN: 98660757
- OCLC no.: 1056447960

Links
- Journal homepage; Online access; Online archive

Psychology & Marketing is a monthly peer-reviewed scientific journal covering the psychological study of marketing and consumer behavior. It was established in 1984 and is published by John Wiley & Sons. The editor-in-chief is Giampaolo Viglia.

== Impact factor ==
According to Journal Citation Reports, Psychology & Marketing the journal had a 2021 impact factor of 5.507, ranking it 68th out of 155 journals in the category "Business" and 18th out of 83 in the category "Psychology, Applied". For 2024, it had an SCImago Journal Rank of 3.497 and an H-index of 154.
