= Dwayne D. Gremler =

American social scientist, academic, and author

- Occupations: Social scientist, academic, and author

Academic background
- Education: B.A. M.B.A. Ph.D.
- Alma mater: Arizona State University
- Website: www.gremler.net

Dwayne D. Gremler is a social scientist, academic, and author. He is a professor of Marketing, and a distinguished teaching and research professor in the Schmidthorst College of Business at Bowling Green State University (BGSU).

Gremler's research interests span the fields of marketing with emphasis on service marketing and management. As per Scopus, his work has been cited 11,660 times.

== Education ==
Gremler completed his B.A. in 1980 and M.B.A. in 1990 from Arizona State University. Later in 1995, he obtained a Ph.D. from the same institution.

== Career ==
Gremler started his academic career at Arizona College of the Bible as an instructor from 1987 to 1988. After completing his Ph.D., he worked as an assistant professor of Marketing at the University of Idaho from 1995 till 2000. Subsequently, he was appointed as an associate professor of Marketing at BGSU in 2000 and was promoted to professor of Marketing in 2007. He has been a visiting international professor at the University of Münster and has also worked on the research faculty of the Center for Services Leadership in the W. P. Carey School of Business at Arizona State University. In 2015, he was appointed by BGSU board of trustees as distinguished teaching professor and in 2022, as distinguished research professor.

== Research ==
During his early research studies, Gremler evaluated relational benefits and relationship quality, demonstrating that the concepts of customer satisfaction and confidence benefits tend to impact relationship marketing outcomes. Stephen Brown and he documented how trust impacts customers' loyalty/service organizations, and established the relationship between switching costs and customer loyalty. He also suggested that commercial friendships (between customers and employees) can serve as a switching barrier and a key driver of customer loyalty to service firms.

In 2000, Gremler and Kevin Gwinner examined an aspect of customer-employee relationships, namely rapport, which, according to them, is particularly salient in service businesses characterized by a high number of interpersonal interactions. They further categorized the rapport into enjoyable interaction (EI) and personal connection (PC), concluding that these are the essential variables in assessing behavioral intentions and customer satisfaction. His later research on the topic identified employees' information-sharing practices, responsive customer service, among other things, as major factors that contribute to rapport building.

Gremler's research has also studied the relationships between word of mouth (WoM) behavior and interpersonal relationships between customers and employees. He suggested that customers' WoM behavior can be encouraged by strengthening interpersonal relationships between employees and customers. He also examined the driving forces behind digital WoM communication and discovered that, on opinion-sharing platforms, the desire for social interaction and a fundamental concern for others drive (electronic) WoM communication of goods and services to other customers. Additionally, he investigated the role of emotions in service interactions and the concept of emotional contagion (the idea that customers can catch the emotions displayed by customer service representatives). He established that positive emotional contagion resulted in enhanced customer gratification.

According to Scopus, his research work has 11,660 citations.

== Awards and honors ==
- 2009 – Outstanding Marketing Teacher Award, Academy of Marketing Science
- 2014 – Christopher Lovelock Career Contributions Award, American Marketing Association's Services Special Interest Group

== Bibliography ==
=== Books ===
- Wilson, Alan; Zeithaml, Valarie A.; Bitner, Mary Jo; Gremler, Dwayne D. (2021). Services marketing: integrating customer focus across the firm. McGraw Hill. ISBN 9781526847805.

=== Selected articles ===
- Gwinner, Kevin P.; Gremler, Dwayne D.; Bitner, Mary Jo (1998). "Relational Benefits in Services Industries: The Customer's Perspective". Journal of the Academy of Marketing Science. 26 (2): 101–114. doi:10.1177/0092070398262002.
- Gremler, Dwayne D.; Gwinner, Kevin P. (2000). "Customer-employee Rapport in Service Relationships". Journal of Service Research. 3 (1): 82–104. doi:10.1177/109467050031006.
- Hennig-Thurau, Thorsten; Gwinner, Kevin P.; Gremler, Dwayne D. (2002). "Understanding Relationship Marketing Outcomes: An Integration of Relational Benefits and Relationship Quality". Journal of Service Research. 4 (3): 230–247. doi:10.1177/1094670502004003006.
- Gremler, Dwayne D. (2004). "The Critical Incident Technique in Service Research". Journal of Service Research. 7 (1): 65–89. doi:10.1177/1094670504266138.
- Hennig-Thurau, Thorsten; Gwinner, Kevin P.; Walsh, Gianfranco; Gremler, Dwayne D. (2004). "Electronic Word-of-mouth via Consumer-opinion Platforms: What Motivates Consumers to Articulate Themselves on the Internet?". Journal of Interactive Marketing. 18 (1): 38–52. doi:10.1002/dir.10073.
- Hennig-Thurau, Thorsten; Groth, Markus; Paul, Michael; Gremler, Dwayne D. (2006). "Are All Smiles Created Equal? How Employee-Customer Emotional Contagion and Emotional Labor Impact Service Relationships". Journal of Marketing. 70 (3): 58–73. doi:10.1509/jmkg.70.3.58.
