= Maheba =

- Village
- Location in the contiguous India and Chhatarpur Maheba (India)
- Coordinates: 24°58′52″N 79°28′26″E
- Country: India
- State: Madhya Pradesh
- District: Chhatarpur
- Elevation: 275 m (902 ft)

Languages
  - Official: Hindi[Bundeli]
- Time zone: UTC+5:30 (IST)
- PIN: 471201
- Telephone code: 07682
- Vehicle registration: MP-16

Maheba, is a village and a tehsil in Chhatarpur district in the state of Madhya Pradesh, India. It is located 3.5km from National Highway 39.

== History ==
Chhatarpur was founded in 1785 and is named after the Bundela Rajput leader Chhatrasal, the founder of Bundelkhand independence, and contains his cenotaph. The state was ruled by his descendants until 1785. At that time the Ponwar clan of the Rajputs took control of Chhatarpur. The state was guaranteed to Kunwar Sone Singh Ponwar in 1806 by the British Raj. In 1854 Chhatarpur would have lapsed to the British government for want of direct heirs under the doctrine of lapse, but was conferred on Jagat Raj as a special act of grace. The Ponwar Rajas ruled a princely state with an area of 1,118 square miles (2,900 km^{2}), and population of 156,139 in 1901, which was part of the Bundelkhand agency of Central India.

In 1901 the town of Chhatarpur had a population of 10,029, a high school and manufactured paper and coarse cutlery. The state also contained the British cantonment of Nowgong.

== Flora and Fauna ==
From National Highway 39 to village many trees of sugar-apples can be found on both sides of road. It also found in many areas of forest around the village.

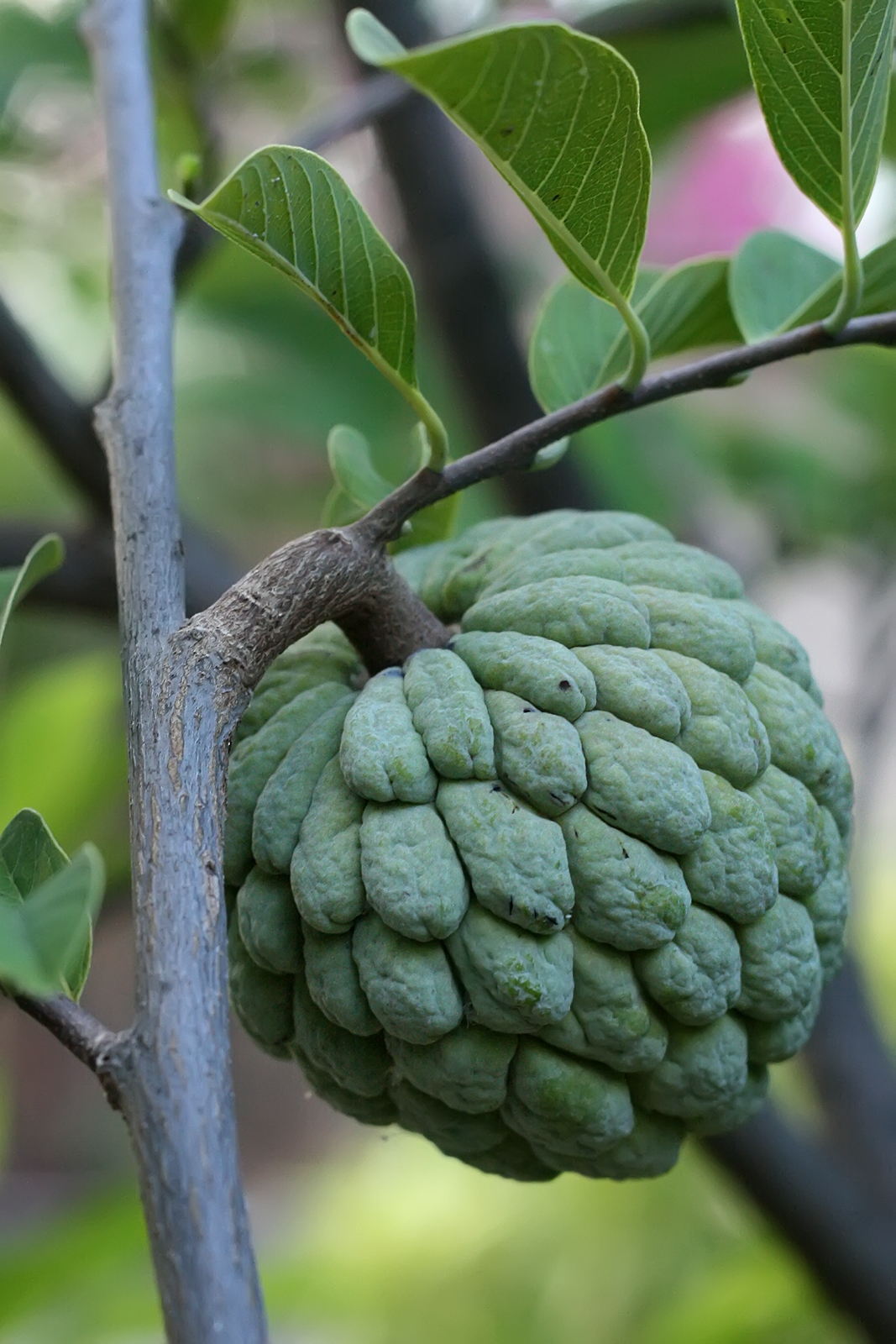
Sugar apple on tree

== Economy ==
There is no large scale industry in Maheba apart from agriculture . Most depend for their livelihood on farming. This region is in a drought-affected area, so the whole place faces a water crisis for farming and potable drinking water.

== Transportation ==
Maheba can be reach by road . Chhatarpur station started in 2017. Chhatarpur has railway station named Maharaja Chhatrasal Station Chhatarpur. The nearest railway stations are at Khajuraho (45 km), Harpalpur (55 km) Jhansi (125 km), Mauranipur (65 km) and Satna (140 km). The nearest airport is Khajuraho Civil Aerodrome, located 45 km away.

== Tourism ==
- Gora Taal Lake, 2.8 km from village
- Jagat Sagar Lake, 2.3 km from village
- Dhubela, a museum 2.6 km from Maheba
- Jatashankar, a holy place near Bijawar
- Bhimkund, a natural water tank and a holy place near Banja
- Gangau dam, a huge structure built at the confluence of two rivers, namely the Simiri River and Ken River (a prominent river of Bundelkhand), near Khajuraho, around 18 km away.
- Raneh Falls, the only waterfall in Asia having igneous rock. It is around 17 km from Khajuraho
- Hanuman Tauria, a Hanuman temple
- Bambar Baini, Ancient temple of maa Durga on a hill in Lavkushnagar
- Panna National Park, near Panna district
- Pandav Falls, close to Khajuraho, Pandavas said to have sought shelter here during exile
- Hanuman Mandir, temple of Hanuman on a hill in Lavkushnagar

== Gallery ==
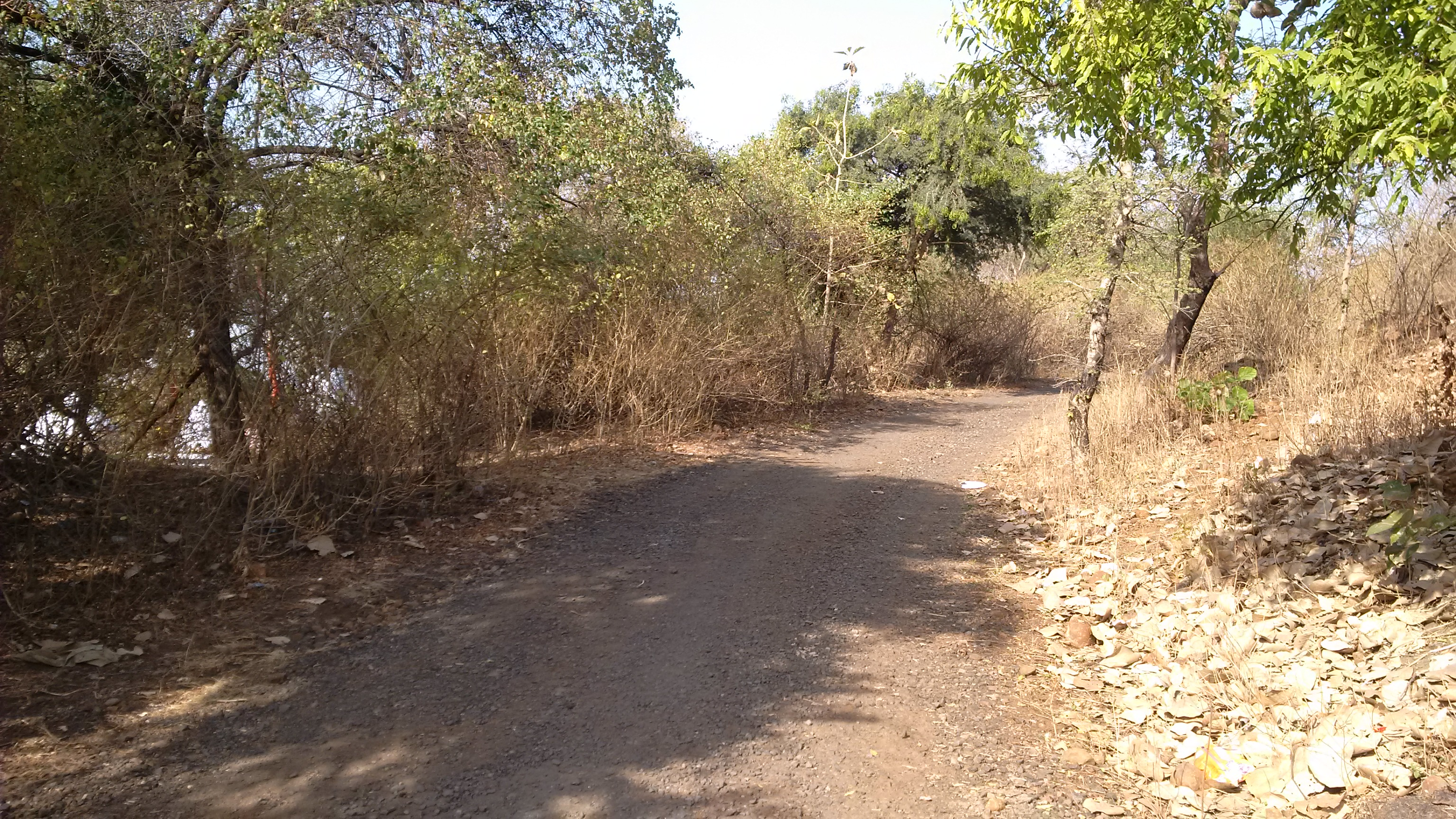
Maheba street

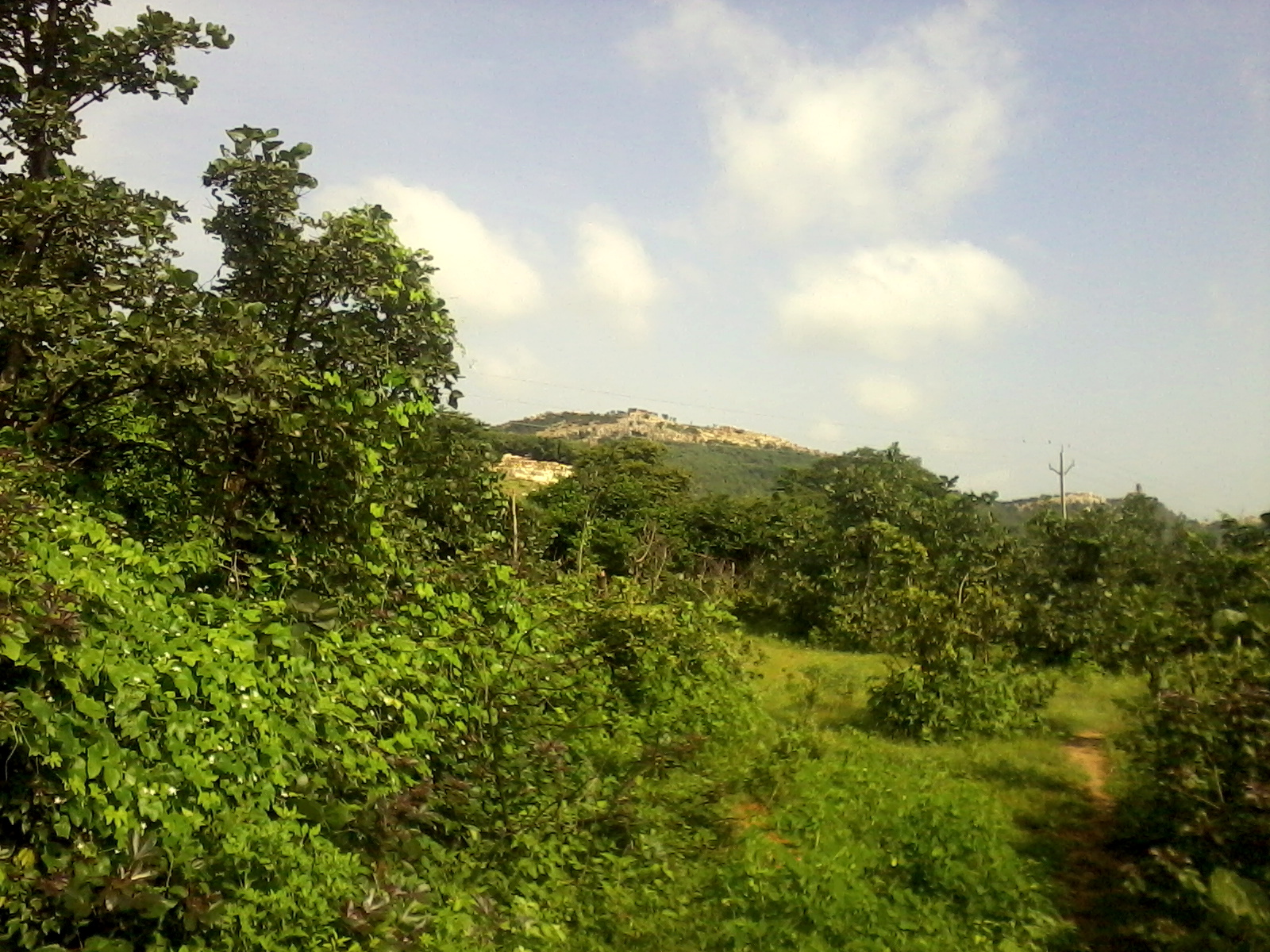
Maheba forest

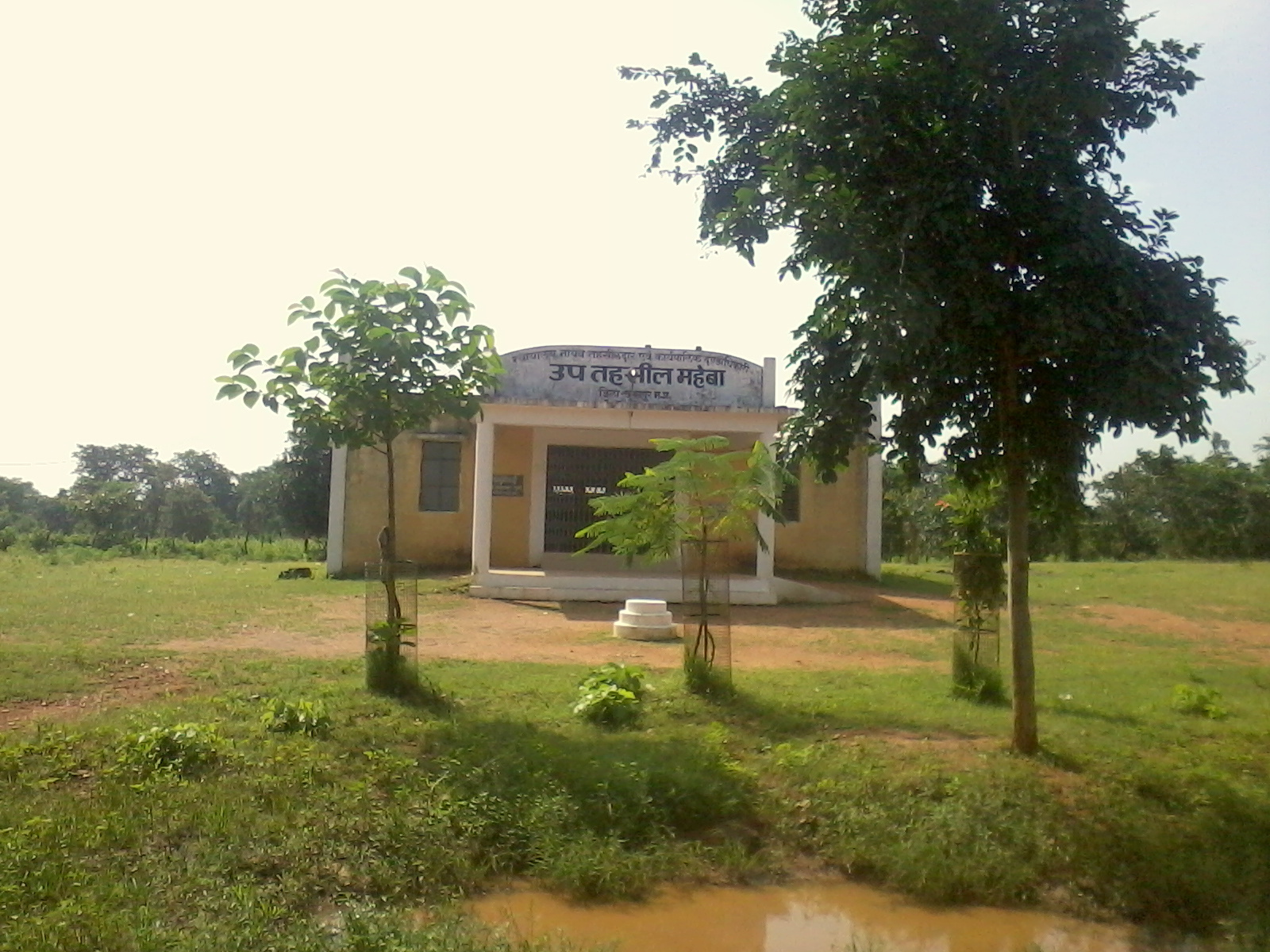
Uptehsil of maheba village

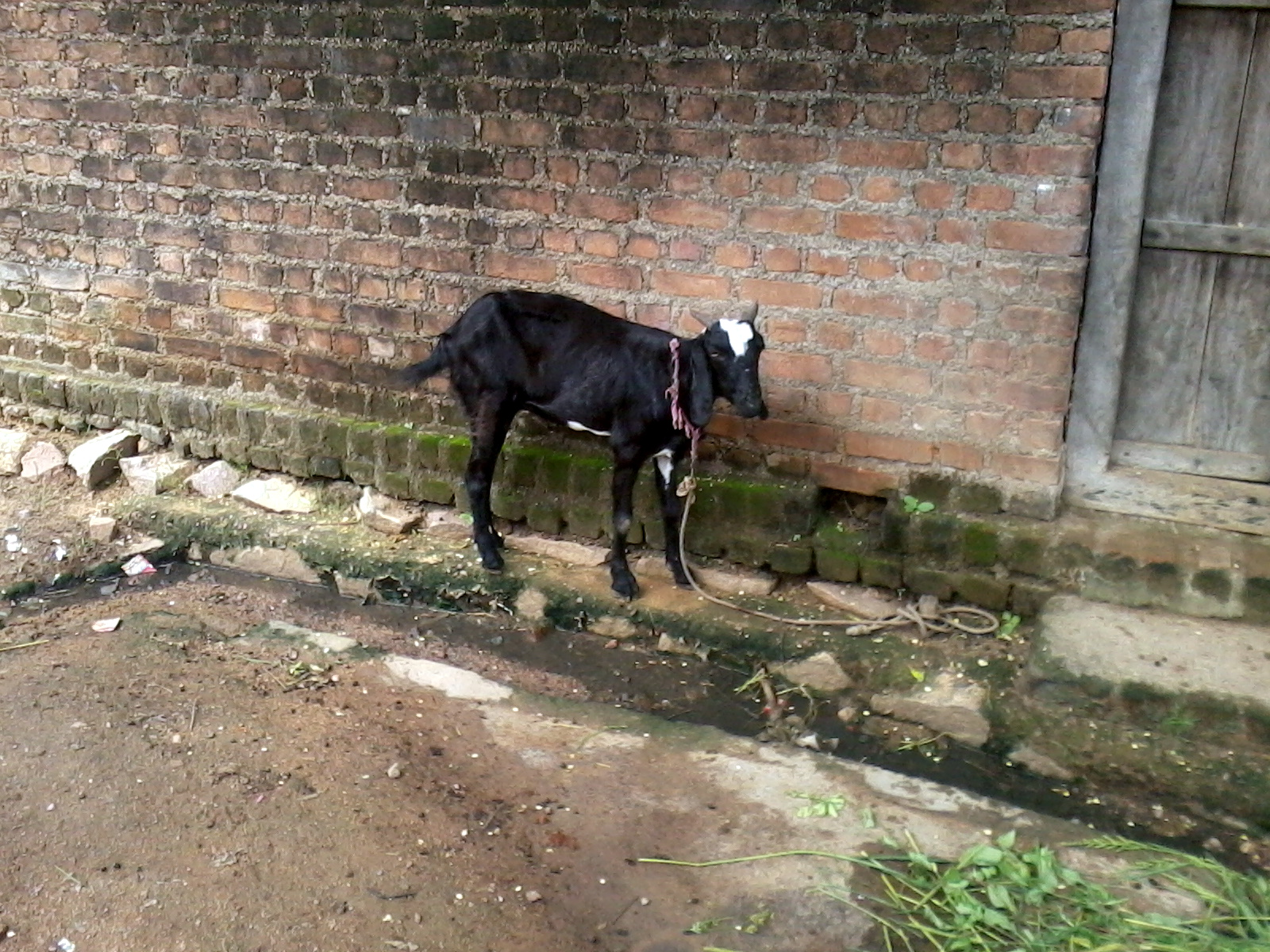
maheba village

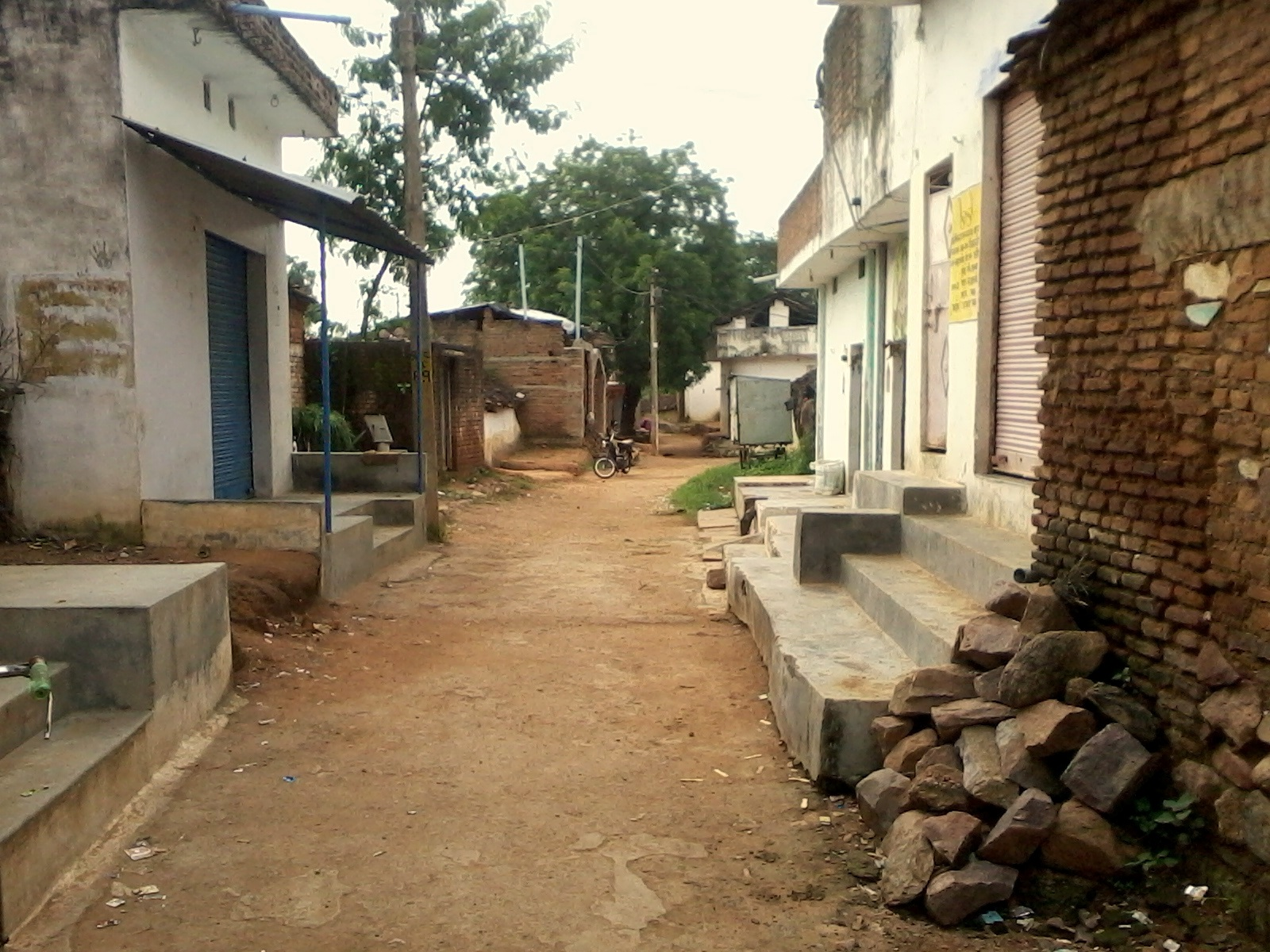
Maheba village during morning

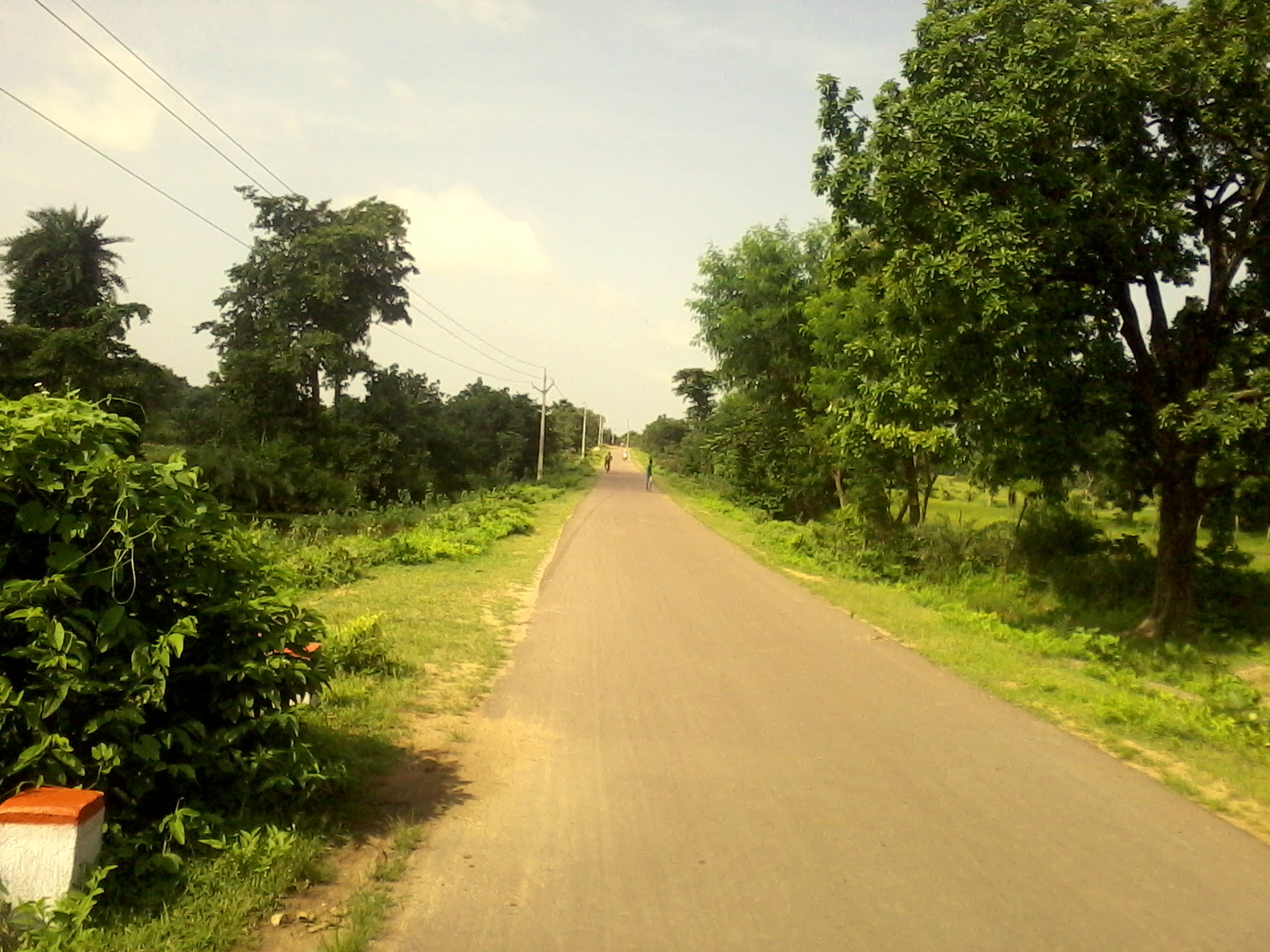
Maheba road

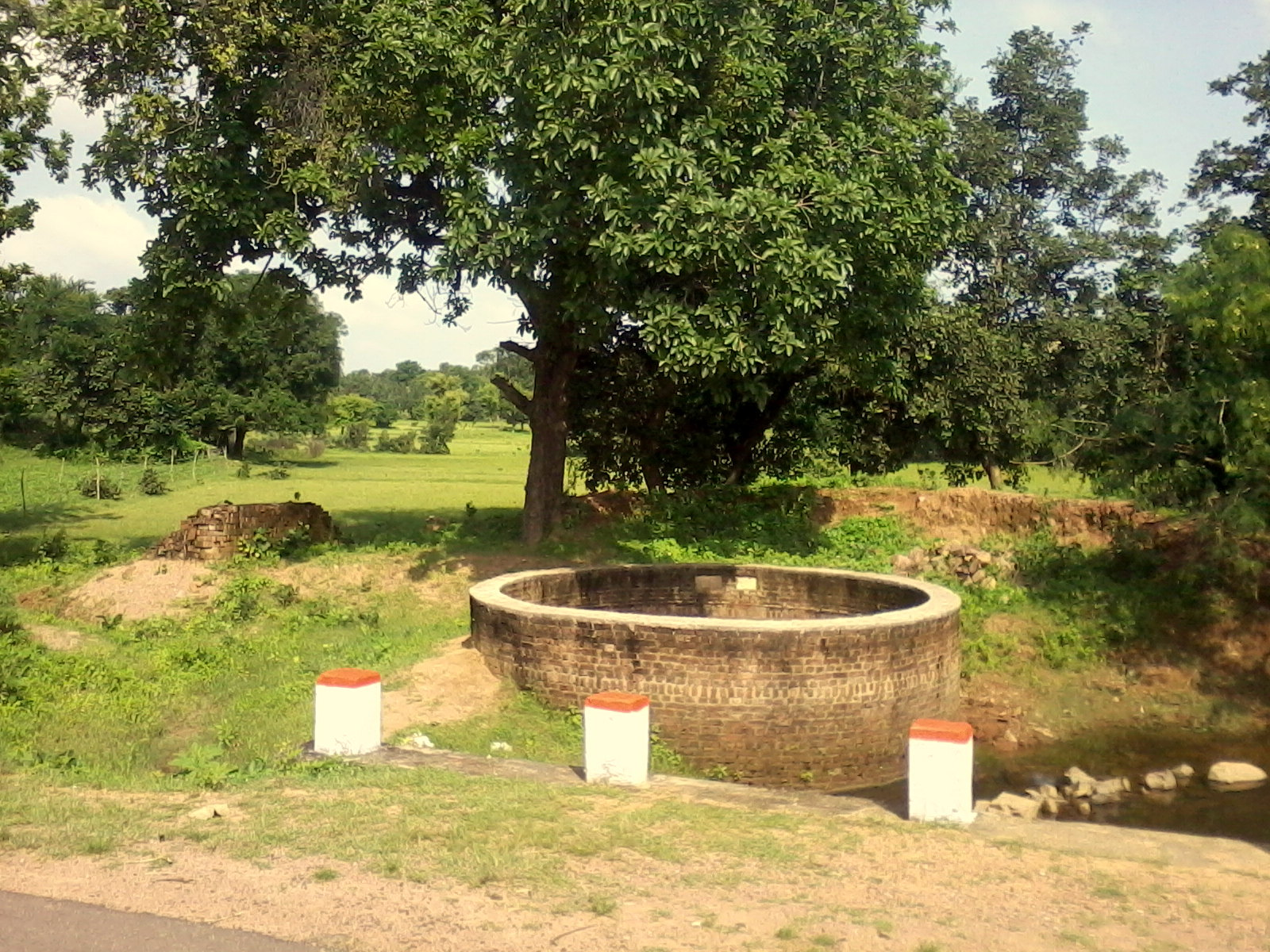
Maheba forest

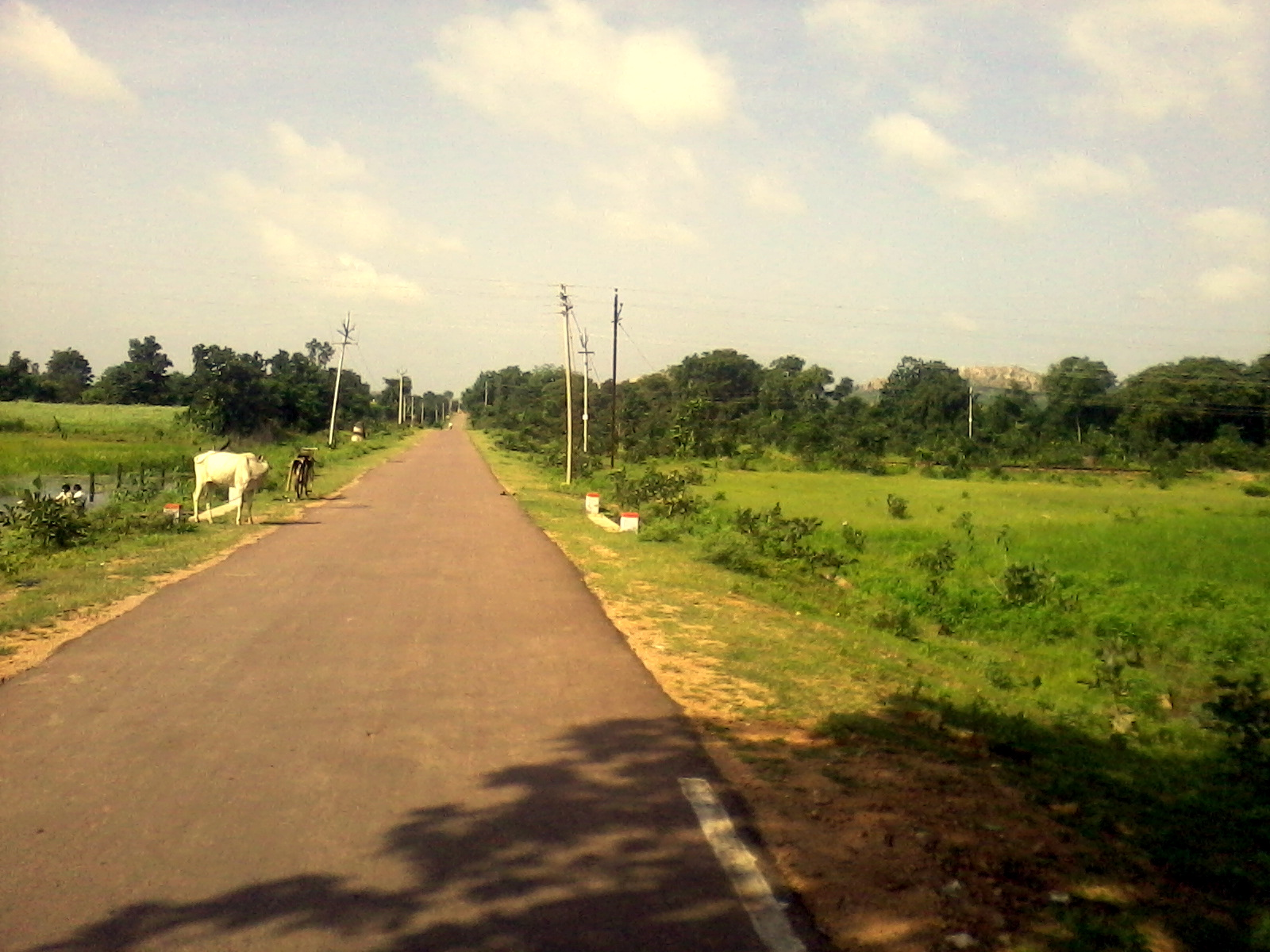
Maheba road

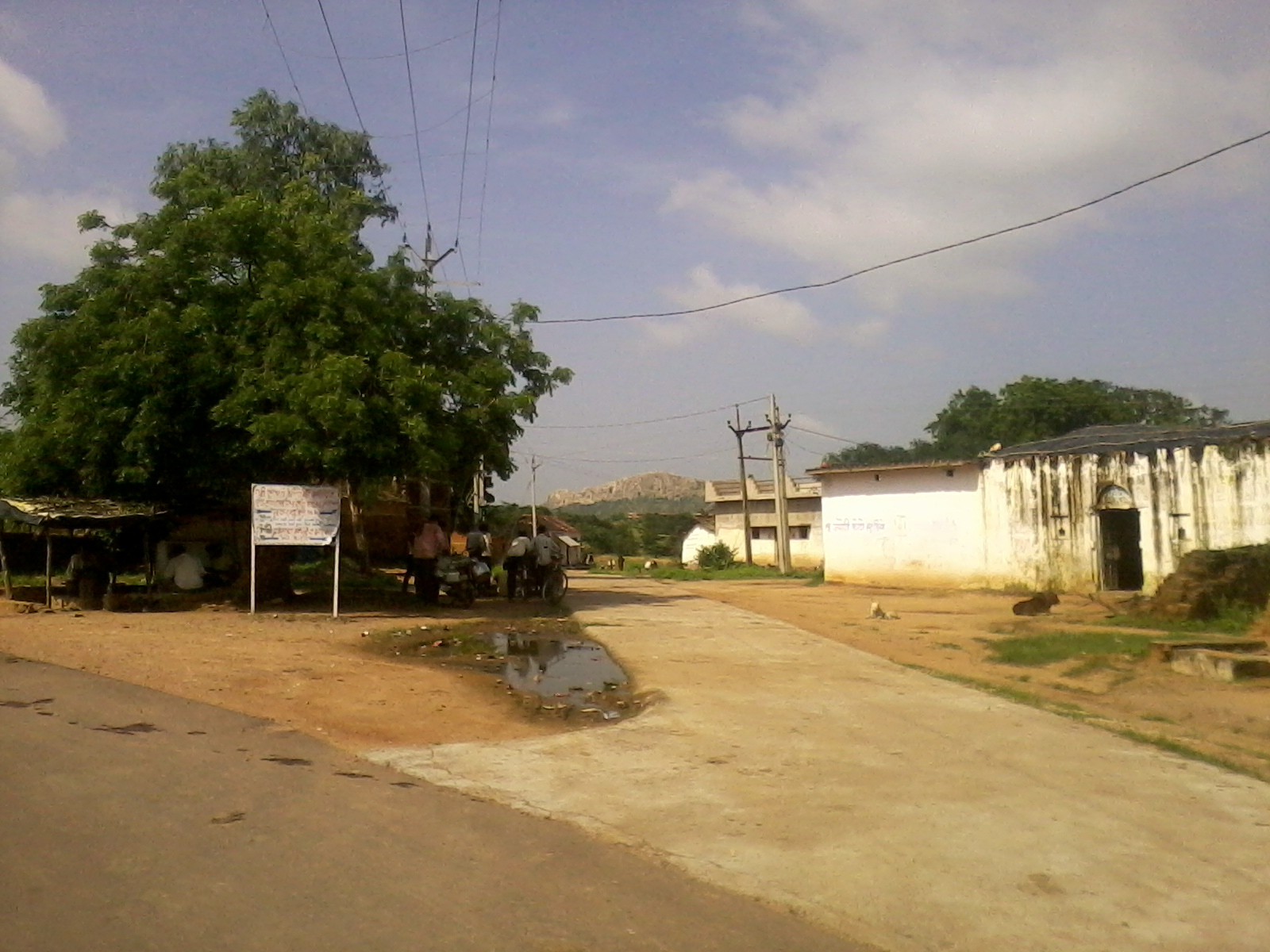
Right road to Dhubela and left for Maheba

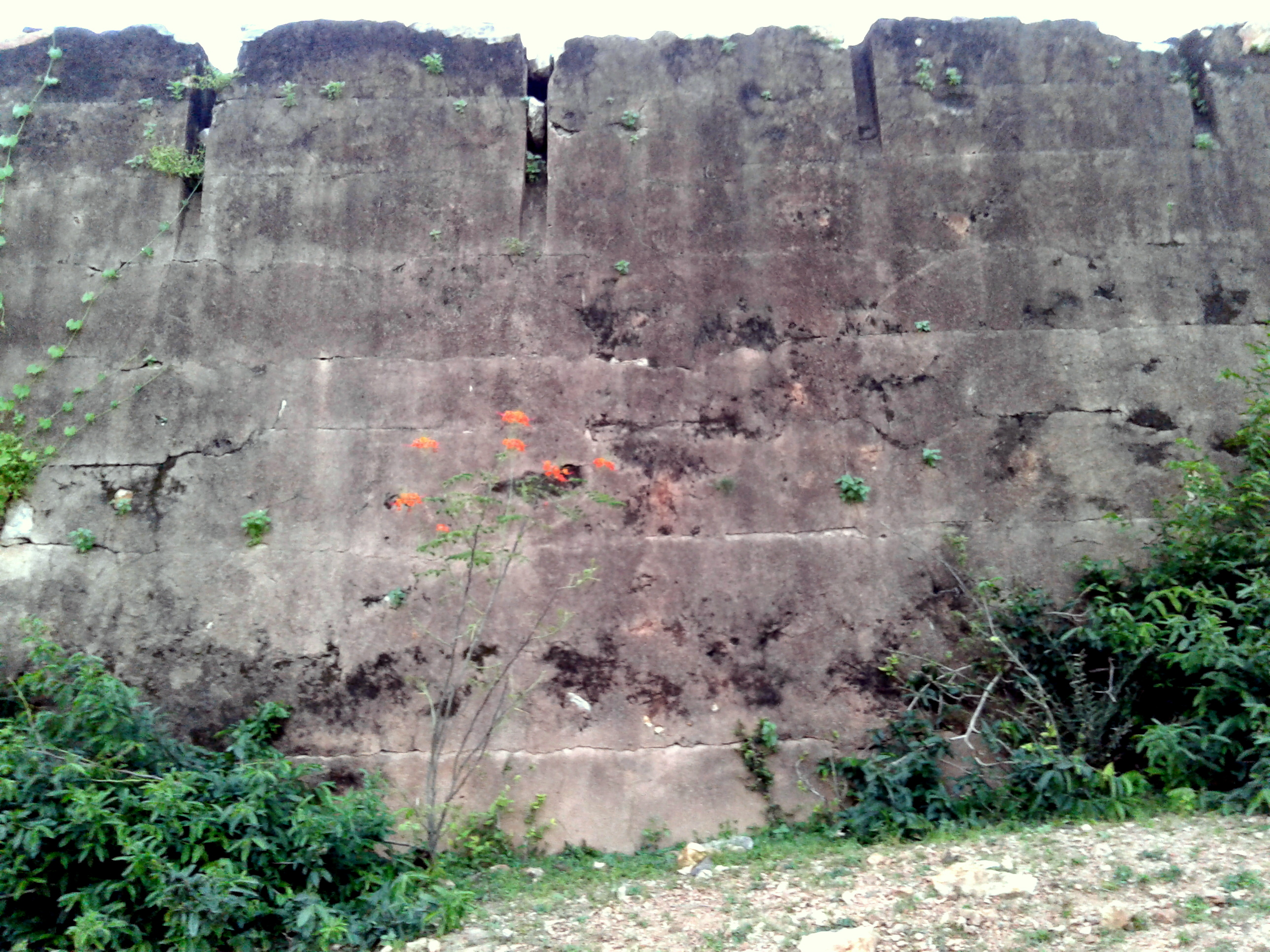
Castle wall of Chhatrasal

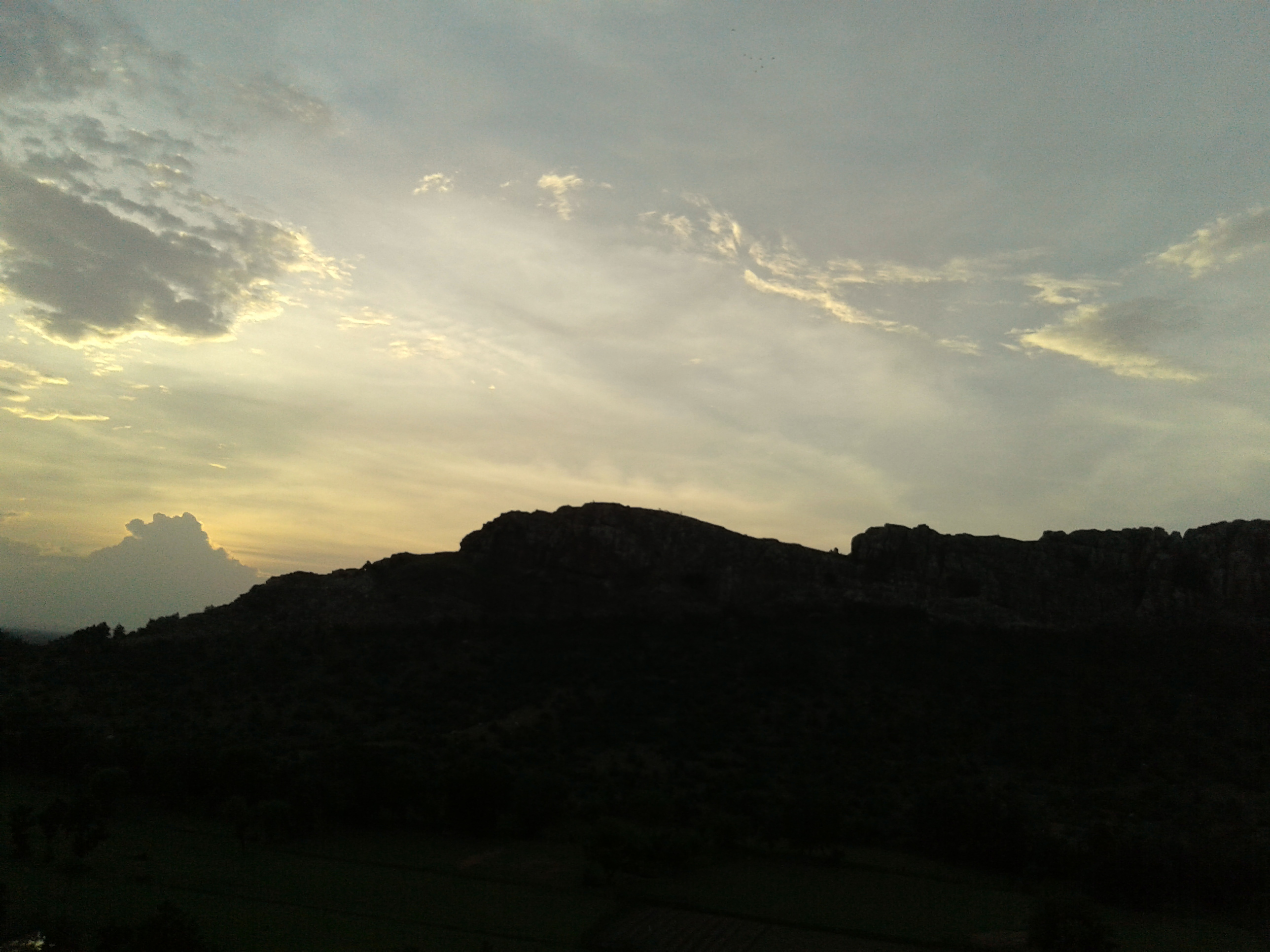
Riddi Siddi hill from castle wall

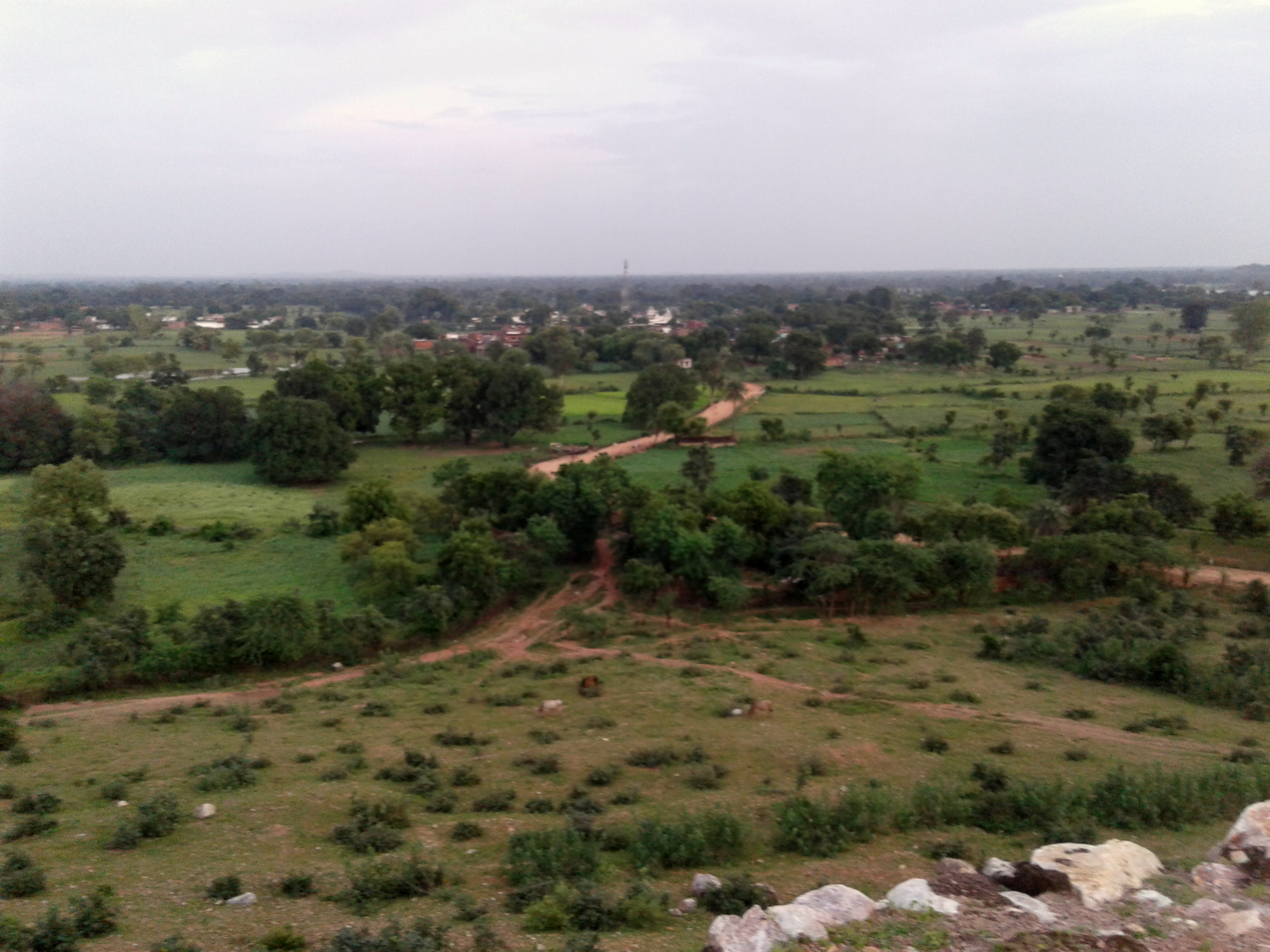
Maheba village from castle wall

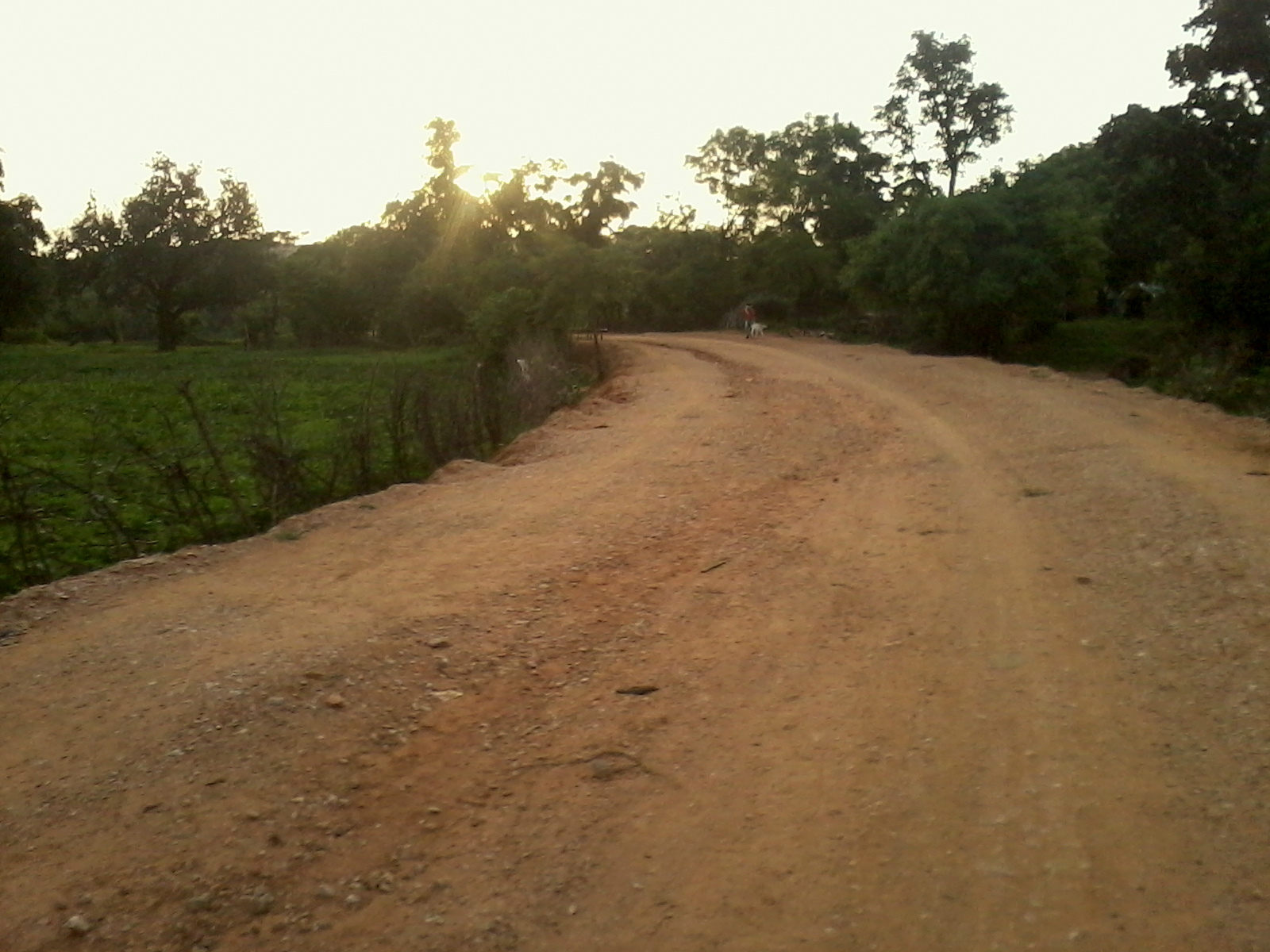
Road from Torna to Maheba village

== Bibliography ==
- J. R. Ackerley, Hindoo Holiday, NYRB Classics, ISBN 978-0-940322-25-7
