= Chhatarpur (disambiguation) =

Chhatarpur is a city and a municipality in Madhya Pradesh, India.

Chhatarpur may also refer to:

- Chhatarpur district, Madhya Pradesh, India; centred on the city
  - Chhatarpur tehsil, subdistrict
  - Chhatarpur State, former princely state of India
- Chhatarpur Temple, Hindu temple in Delhi, India
  - Chhattarpur (Delhi Metro), metro station in Delhi, India
- Chatarpur block, Jharkhand, India
- Chhatarpura, village in Bihar, India

== Electoral constituencies ==
- Chhatarpur Assembly constituency (disambiguation)
  - Chhatarpur (Delhi Assembly constituency)
  - Chhatarpur (Jharkhand Assembly constituency)
  - Chhatarpur (Madhya Pradesh Assembly constituency)
- Chatarpur (Lok Sabha constituency), Madhya Pradesh
- Chatarpur (Lok Sabha constituency), Odisha
