= Baini =

Baini may refer to:

- Abbate Giuseppe Baini (1775–1844), Italian priest, music critic, conductor, and composer
- Baini Prashad (1894–1969), Indian zoologist
- Bambar Baini, regional incarnation of the Devi (Mother Goddess) closely identified with Amba
