= Garhi-Malhara =

- city
- Location in Madhya Pradesh, India Garhi-Malhara (India)
- Coordinates: 25°2′41″N 79°40′38″E
- Country: India
- State: Madhya Pradesh
- District: Chhatarpur

Population (2001)
  - Total: 12,962

Languages
  - Official: Hindi
- Time zone: UTC+5:30 (IST)
- Postal code: 471411
- ISO 3166 code: IN-MP
- Vehicle registration: MP
- Website: MP16

Garhi-Malhara is a town and a nagar panchayat in Chhatarpur district in the state of Madhya Pradesh, India.

The lake side view looks like a hill station.

== Demographics ==
As of 2001 India census, Garhi-Malhara had a population of 12,962. Males constitute 53% of the population and females 47%. Garhi-Malhara has an average literacy rate of 53%, lower than the national average of 59.5%: male literacy is 61%, and female literacy is 45%. In Garhi-Malhara, 16% of the population is under 6 years of age.
