= Chandla =

- city
- Location in Madhya Pradesh, India Chandla (India)
- Coordinates: 25.08°N 80.2°E
- Country: India
- State: Madhya Pradesh
- District: Chhatarpur
- Elevation: 177 m (581 ft)

Population (2001)
  - Total: 10,207

Languages
  - Official: Hindi
- Time zone: UTC+5:30 (IST)
- Postal code: 471525
- ISO 3166 code: IN-MP
- Vehicle registration: MP
- Website: MP16

Chandla is a town and a nagar parishad in Chandla Assembly constituency, Chhatarpur district in the state of Madhya Pradesh, India.

== Nearest airport ==
Khajuraho Airport is located at a distance of 60 kilometers from Chandla.

== Nearest railway station ==
Khajuraho railway station and Mahoba Railway Station are located at a distance of 65 kilometers from Chandla.

== State highways in Madhya Pradesh ==
MP SH 5 Gaurihar - Chandla - Bachhon - Rajnagar - Khajuraho - Bameetha - Ganjdewra 116 kilometres

== Educational Institutions ==
1 - Government College Chandla. 2 - Government I. T. I. Chandla. 3 - Government Sandipani Vidyalay Chandla. 4 - Government Girls higher secondary school Chandla.

== Nearest district and distance ==
1- Chhatarpur district - 80 k.m. 2- Panna district - 55 k.m. 3- Banda district, Uttar Pradesh - 60 k.m. 4- Mahoba district, Uttar Pradesh - 44 k.m.

== Geography ==
Chandla is located at 25.08°N 80.2°E. It has an average elevation of 177 metres (580 feet). It is hilly and located on the bank of Ken river.

== Demographics ==
As of 2001 India census, Chandla had a population of 10,207. Males constitute 53% of the population and females 47%. Chandla has an average literacy rate of 70%, higher than the national average of 59.5%; with male literacy of 75% and female literacy of 60%. 20% of the population is under 6 years of age.
