= Dr. C.V. Raman University, Khandwa =

Private university in Madhya Pradesh

- Established: 2018
- Affiliations: UGC
- Chancellor: Santosh Choubey
- Vice-Chancellor: Dr. Arun R. Joshi
- Location: Balkhandsura, Khandwa, Madhya Pradesh, India; 21.822°N 76.227°E
- Website: www.cvrump.ac.in

Dr. C.V. Raman University, Khandwa is a private university located at the village Balkhandsura, near the Khandwa-Indore road, in Khandwa district, Madhya Pradesh, India.

== History ==
The university was established in 2018 by the All India Society for Electronics & Computer Technology (AISECT) under the Madhya Pradesh Niji Vishwavidyalay (Sthapana Evam Sanchalan) Sanshodhan Adhiniyam, 2018, an Act which also established Shri Krishna University and Sardar Patel University Balaghat. The university offers various diploma, undergraduate and postgraduate courses in seven faculties. It is named after India physicist C. V. Raman.

== Academics ==
The institute offers diploma, undergraduate and postgraduate courses through seven faculties:

- Faculty of Arts
- Faculty of Agriculture
- Faculty of Fine Arts
- Faculty of Commerce
- Faculty of Computer Science and IT
- Faculty of Management
- Faculty of Science
