= Government Girls P.G. College =

Post-graduate college in India

- Type: Public
- Established: 1962
- Academic affiliations: Maharaja Chhatrasal Bundelkhand University
- Principal: Mangla Sharma
- Location: Chhatarpur, Madhya Pradesh, India; 24.899°N 79.590°E
- Campus: Urban
- Website: www.mp.gov.in/highereducation/ggpgcchhatarpur/

Government Girls P.G. College is a post-graduate college for girls in Chhatarpur, Madhya Pradesh, India. It is located on the Gwalior-Allahabad National Highway and is adjacent to Narshingh Mandir of Chhatarpur City. It lies about 45 kilometres (28 mi) away from Khajuraho.

It has about nine acres of land. The college is the only postgraduate girls college in the three districts of Madhya Pradesh. i.e. Panna, Chhatarpur and Tikamgarh. The college comes under the jurisdiction of Add. Director Higher Education, Rewa and is affiliated to Dr. Hari Singh Gour University, Sagar (M.P.), 165 km. away from Chhatarpur.

== History ==
Chhatarpur was founded by Bundelkhand ruler Maharaja Chhatrasal. It comes under the 49 legislative assembly and 06 Khajuraho parliamentary constituency. Chhatarpur is connected to train route through Harpalpur Station which is 58 km. away.

The Government Girls P. G. College was founded on 28 Oct. 1968, as a private college by the M.P. Education Society. It was then known as the Arts and Home Science Girls College. The number of girl students at that time was 20–25.

The society carried on its work until 1997, after which it handed over administration to Siksha Prasar Samiti, that continued working from Oct 1977 to Sept. 1982, during these years the number of girls student was 150–200.

On 1 October 1982 the college was undertaken by M.P. Government. It was declared a postgraduate college in 1996. Presently the college has faculties of Art, Science and Home Science. There 720 girl students.

== Aims and objectives ==
- Provision of higher education for girls in Arts, Science, Home Science and Music,
- Computer education to girls through Project Gyanodaya,
- Development of social status and community feelings in the students by participating in NSS. Through NCC Students will develop disciplinary life along with a feeling of patriotism,
- Facilities of games and sports for keeping physically fit.
