= Bada Malhera tehsil =

Location in Madhya Pradesh, India

- Tehsil
- Location in Madhya Pradesh Bada Malhera tehsil (India)
- Coordinates: 24°34′9″N 79°19′46″E
- Country: India
- State: Madhya Pradesh
- District: Chhatarpur district

Government
  - Type: Janpad Panchayat
  - Body: Council

Languages
  - Official: Hindi
- Time zone: UTC+5:30 (IST)
- ISO 3166 code: MP-IN

Bada Malhera tehsil is a tehsil in Chhatarpur District, Madhya Pradesh, India. It is also a subdivision of the administrative and revenue division of Sagar district of Madhya Pradesh.
