= Mahoi Kalan =

- Location within Madhya Pradesh Location within India
- Coordinates: 25.136°N 80.300°E
- Country: India
- State: Madhya Pradesh
- District: Chhatarpur district

Population (2011)
  - Total: 2,172

Mahoi Kalan is a village in Chhatarpur district, Madhya Pradesh state of India. The pin code of the village is 471525.
