= Chhatarpur Assembly constituency =

Chhatarpur Assembly constituency may refer to these state electoral constituencies in India:

- Chhatarpur, Delhi Assembly constituency
- Chhatarpur, Jharkhand Assembly constituency
- Chhatarpur, Madhya Pradesh Assembly constituency

== See also ==
- Chhatarpur (disambiguation)
