= Satai =

- city
- Location in Madhya Pradesh, India
- Coordinates: 24°43′17″N 79°37′56″E
- Country: India
- State: Madhya Pradesh
- District: Chhatarpur

Population (2011)
  - Total: 10,592

Languages
  - Official: Hindi Bundeli
- Time zone: UTC+5:30 (IST)
- Postal code: 471408
- ISO 3166 code: IN-MP
- Vehicle registration: MP

Satai (/sətəiː/) is a town and a nagar panchayat in Chhatarpur district in the Indian state of Madhya Pradesh.

== Geography ==
Satai is located on 24°43′17″N 79°37′56″E. It has an average elevation of 508 metres (1669 feet).

== Demographics ==
As of 2001 India census, Satai had a population of 8293. Males constitute 53% of the population and females 47%. Satai has an average literacy rate of 40%, lower than the national average of 59.5%: male literacy is 52%, and female literacy is 27%. In Satai, 21% of the population is under 6 years of age.
