= Ghuwara =

Ghuwara Ghaura
- Nagar
- Ghuwara
- Location in Madhya Pradesh, India Ghuwara (India)
- Coordinates: 24°30′48″N 79°5′4″E
- Country: India
- State: Madhya Pradesh
- District: Chhatarpur
- Founder: Kirat Singh Judev

Government
  - Type: Municipal Board
  - Body: Tehsildar

Population (2011)
  - Total: 19,813
  - Rank: 304 in mp

Languages
  - Official: Hindi, English Bundelkhandi
- Time zone: UTC+5:30 (IST)
- Postal code: 471313 Place for visitors = ghuwara fort
- Telephone code: 07689
- ISO 3166 code: IN-MP
- Vehicle registration: Mp 16
- Website: http://ghuwara.mpenagarpalika.com/

Ghuwara is a town and a nagar panchayat in Chhatarpur district in the Indian state of Madhya Pradesh.Also known as the heart of Bundelkhand.

== Geography ==
Ghuwara is located on 24.513333°N 79.084444°E It has an average elevation of 508 metres (1,669 feet).

== Demographics ==
As of 2001 India census, Ghuwara had a population of 10,813. Males constitute 53% of the population and females 47%. Ghuwara has an average literacy rate of 48%, lower than the national average of 59.5%: male literacy is 58%, and female literacy is 37%. In Ghuwara, 20% of the population is under 6 years of age.

As of 2013 India census, Ghuwara had a population of 22,311.
