= Chhatarpur =

Chhatarpur City of Chhatrasal
- City
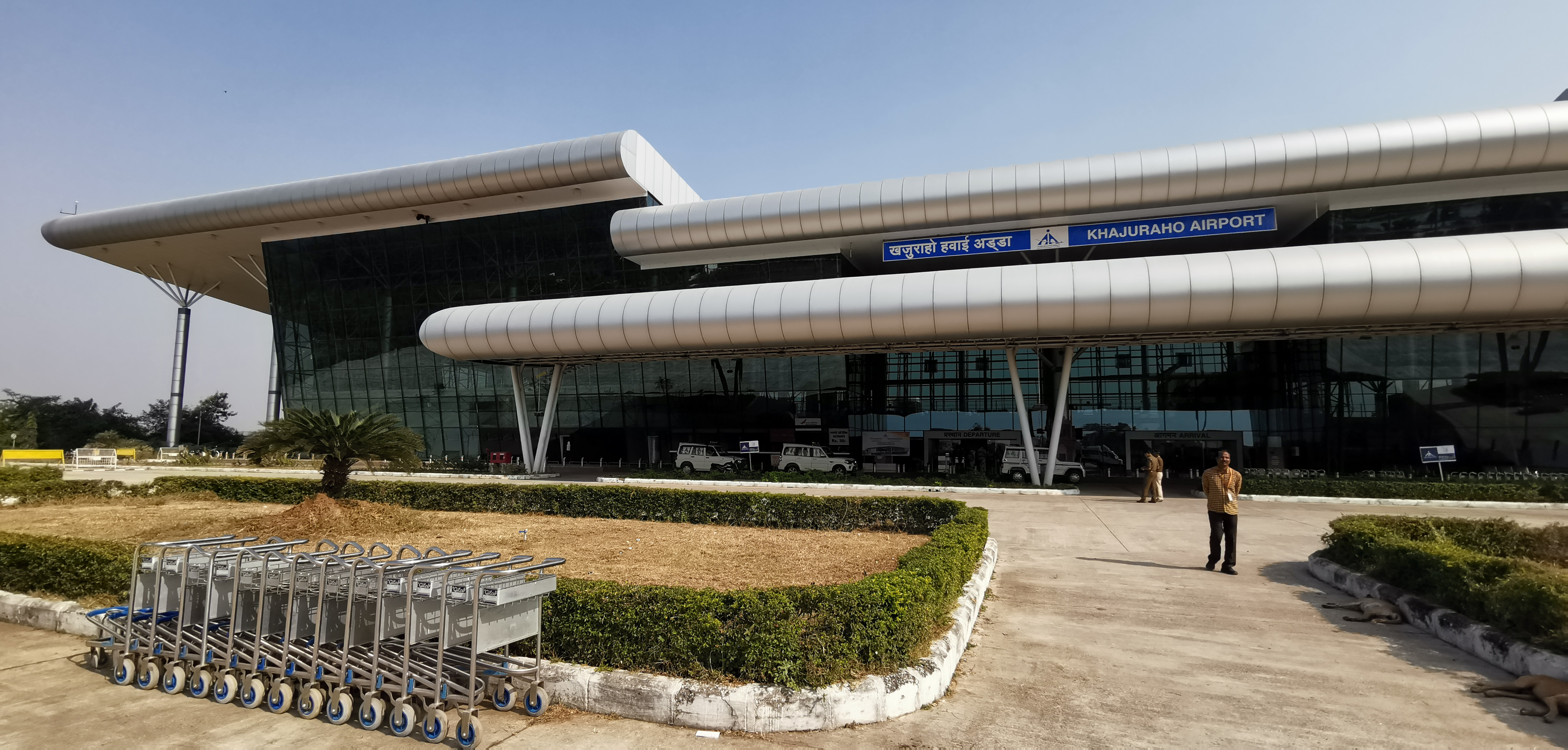
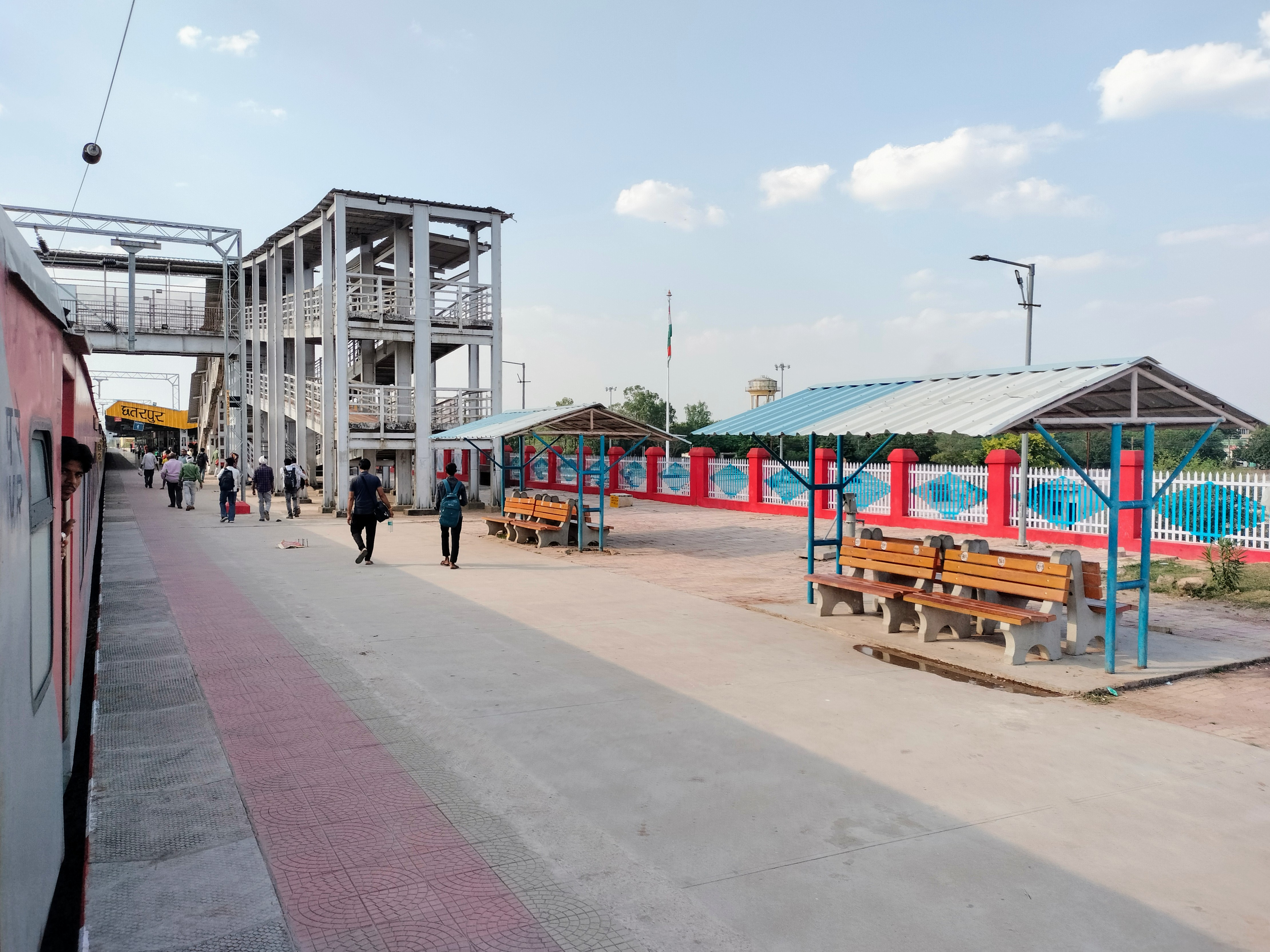
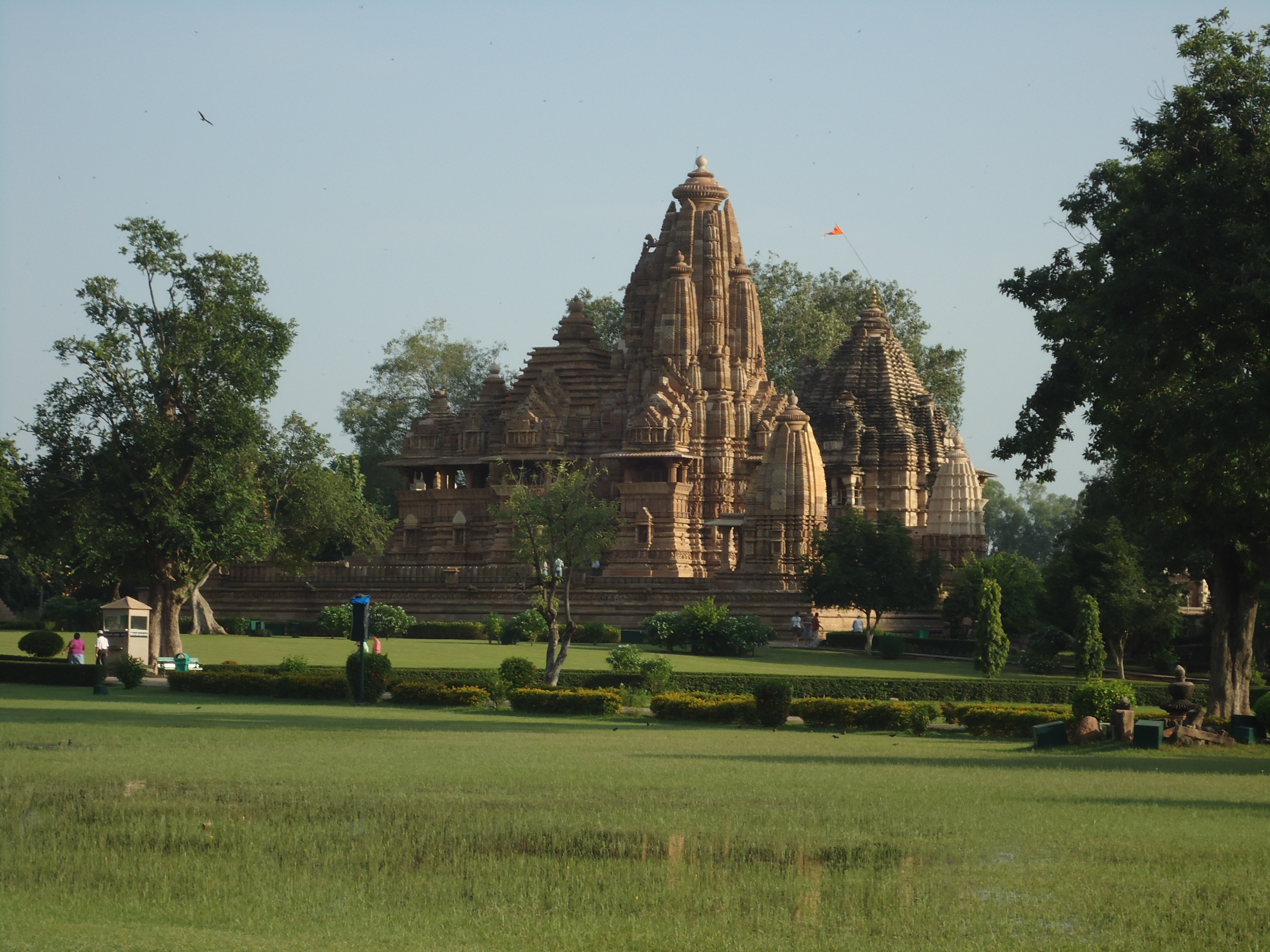
- Khajuraho Airport, Chhatarpur Railway Station, Khajuraho Temples

- Location within Madhya Pradesh Location within India
- Coordinates: 24°54′17.29″N 79°35′7.201″E
- Country: India
- State: Madhya Pradesh
- District: Chhatarpur
- Founder: Maharaja Chhatrasal
- Named for: Chhatrasal

Area
  - Total: 78 km^{2} (30 sq mi)
- Elevation: 305 m (1,001 ft)

Population
  - Total: 459,943
  - Density: 5,896/km^{2} (15,270/sq mi)

Languages
  - Official: Bundelkhandi Hindi
- Time zone: UTC+5:30 (IST)
- PIN: 471001
- Telephone code: 07682
- Vehicle registration: MP-16
- Sex ratio: 920 ♂/♀
- Website: chhatarpur.nic.in

Chhatarpur is a city and a municipality in Chhatarpur district in the state of Madhya Pradesh, India. It is the administrative headquarters of Chhatarpur District.

== History ==
Chhatarpur was founded in 1785 and is named after leader Chhatrasal, the founder of Bundelkhand region, and contains his cenotaph. The state was ruled by his descendants until 1785. At that time the Pawar clan of the Rajputs took control of Chhatarpur. The state was guaranteed to Kunwar Sone Singh Pawar in 1806 by the British Raj. In 1854 Chhatarpur would have lapsed to the British government for want of direct heirs under the doctrine of lapse, but was conferred on Jagat Raj as a special act of grace. The Pawar Rajas ruled a princely state with an area of 1,118 square miles (2,900 km^{2}), and population of 156,139 in 1901, which was part of the Bundelkhand agency of Central India.

In 1901 the town of Chhatarpur had a population of 10,029, a high school and manufactured paper and coarse cutlery. The state also contained the British cantonment of Nowgong.

=== Rajas ===
- 1785–1816 Kunwar Sone Shah (d. 1816)
- 1816–1854 Partab Singh (d. 1854)
- 1854–1867 Jaghat Singh (b. 1846 – d. 1867)
- 1867–1895 Vishvanath Singh (b. 1866 – d. 1932)

=== Maharajas ===
- (4 May 1649 – 20 December 1731) Maharaja Chhatrasal
- 1895–1932 Vishvanath Singh (b. 1866 – d. 1932)
- 1932–1947 Bhawani Singh (b. 1921 – d. 2006)

After the independence of India in 1947, the Rajas of Chhatarpur acceded to India, and Chhatarpur, together with the rest of Bundelkhand, became part of the Indian state of Vindhya Pradesh. Vindhya Pradesh was later merged into the state of Madhya Pradesh in 1956.

== Geography ==
Chhatarpur is located at 24.5500°N 79.3527°E. It has an average elevation of 305 metres (1,000 feet). It is located on the far north-east border of Madhya Pradesh.

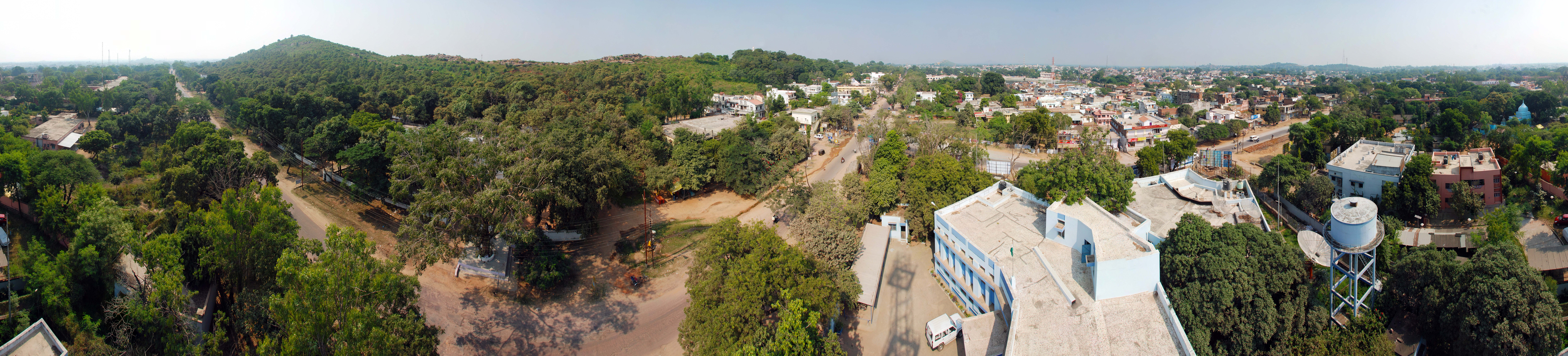
Panoramic view of Chhatarpur
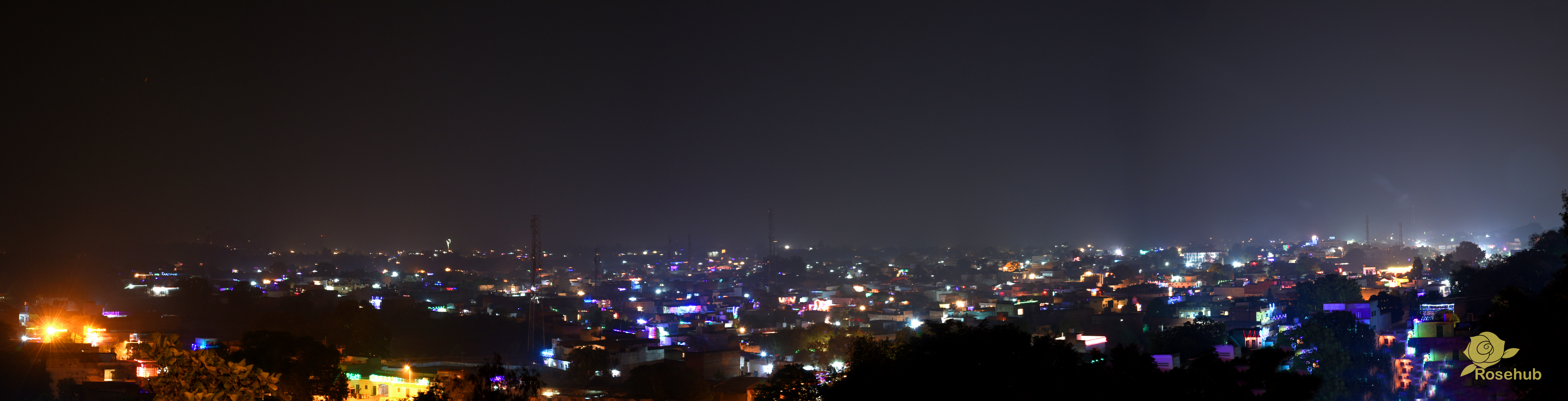
Chhatarpur during Diwali

== Places to visit ==
Places of interest in chhatarpur are Bageshwar dham (25 km from city) Khajuraho temples (40 km) Kutni dam (40 km ) Dhubela measuem (5) Jatashankar temple (40) Hanuman toriya

== Climate ==
Chhatarpur has humid subtropical climate (Köppen climate classification Cwa) with hot summers, a somewhat cooler monsoon season and cool winters. Heavy rainfall occurs in the monsoon season from June to September.

Climate data for Chhatarpur
Month	Jan	Feb	Mar	Apr	May	Jun	Jul	Aug	Sep	Oct	Nov	Dec	Year
Record high °C (°F)	32.3 (90.1)	35.0 (95.0)	39.1 (102.4)	42.8 (109.0)	45.0 (113.0)	47.0 (116.6)	40.0 (104.0)	35.3 (95.5)	38.1 (100.6)	36.0 (96.8)	34.6 (94.3)	30.6 (87.1)	47.0 (116.6)
Mean daily maximum °C (°F)	24.5 (76.1)	26.7 (80.1)	32.2 (90.0)	37.8 (100.0)	40.6 (105.1)	37.2 (99.0)	30.2 (86.4)	28.6 (83.5)	30.4 (86.7)	31.6 (88.9)	28.7 (83.7)	25.1 (77.2)	31.1 (88.1)
Daily mean °C (°F)	17.3 (63.1)	19.9 (67.8)	25.3 (77.5)	30.6 (87.1)	33.5 (92.3)	31.4 (88.5)	26.7 (80.1)	25.6 (78.1)	26.3 (79.3)	25.9 (78.6)	22.4 (72.3)	18.3 (64.9)	25.3 (77.5)
Mean daily minimum °C (°F)	10.2 (50.4)	13.0 (55.4)	18.3 (64.9)	23.3 (73.9)	26.3 (79.3)	25.4 (77.7)	23.2 (73.8)	22.5 (72.5)	22.1 (71.8)	20.2 (68.4)	16.0 (60.8)	11.5 (52.7)	19.3 (66.8)
Record low °C (°F)	1.0 (33.8)	4.9 (40.8)	9.8 (49.6)	14.3 (57.7)	18.3 (64.9)	18.1 (64.6)	19.9 (67.8)	16.6 (61.9)	17.0 (62.6)	12.1 (53.8)	9.1 (48.4)	1.2 (34.2)	1.0 (33.8)
Average precipitation mm (inches)	25 (1.0)	10 (0.4)	9 (0.4)	3 (0.1)	5 (0.2)	92 (3.6)	321 (12.6)	400 (15.7)	179 (7.0)	27 (1.1)	13 (0.5)	10 (0.4)	1,094 (43)
Average rainy days	2.3	2.3	0.8	0.2	1.9	9.6	16.5	19.7	10.0	2.2	0.9	1.2	67.6
Average relative humidity (%)	49	43	32	25	29	55	81	86	75	52	43	49	52
Source: NOAA (1971–1990)

== Demographics ==
As of 2011 India census, Chhatarpur had a population of 99 519. Males constitute 53% of the population and females 47%. Chhatarpur has an average literacy rate of 69%: with male literacy of 75% and female literacy of 62%. 15% of the population is under 6 years of age.

Religion in Chhatarpur (2011)
Religion
Hinduism	79.86%
Islam	17.50%
Others	2.30%

== Economy ==
There is no large scale industry in Chhatarpur apart from a few small scale industries available, but these industries are not sufficient for giving enough employment to local people. The economy is mostly dependent on farming. The city however, has a growing private commercial sector, mainly retail businesses. There are many granite mining and polishing industries operating in Chhatarpur district. Chhatarpur furniture industry also a big employment to local people.

Most depend for their livelihood on farming. This region is in a drought-affected area, so the whole district faces a water crisis for farming and potable drinking water.

There is a proposal to set up a solar plant in Barethi village, 20 kilometers away from Chhatarpur. The capacity of the plant is 550 MW.

== Administration ==
Chhatarpur Police is a Law enforcing unit of MP Police which protects the world heritage "Khajuraho Group of Monuments". The district is divided into 5 police subdivisions, with 34 Police Stations and 21 outposts.

== Education ==
India's largest chain schooling Kendriya Vidyalaya is situated here.

Most of the colleges in Chhatarpur district are affiliated to Maharaja Chhatrasal Bundelkhand University, Chhatarpur. They offer graduate and post-graduate courses in the faculties of Arts, Science, Commerce, Education and Law. Government Maharaja P.G. College, Government Girls P.G. College, Shri Krishna University and Digital Institute of Science & Technology are the premier institutions of graduate and post-graduate education in the city. chhatarpur medical college is under construction.Christian English College is the only CISCE- affiliated school of the city. Swami Pranawanand Homeopathic Medical College is affiliated to Madhya Pradesh Medical Science University, Jabalpur.

== Transportation ==
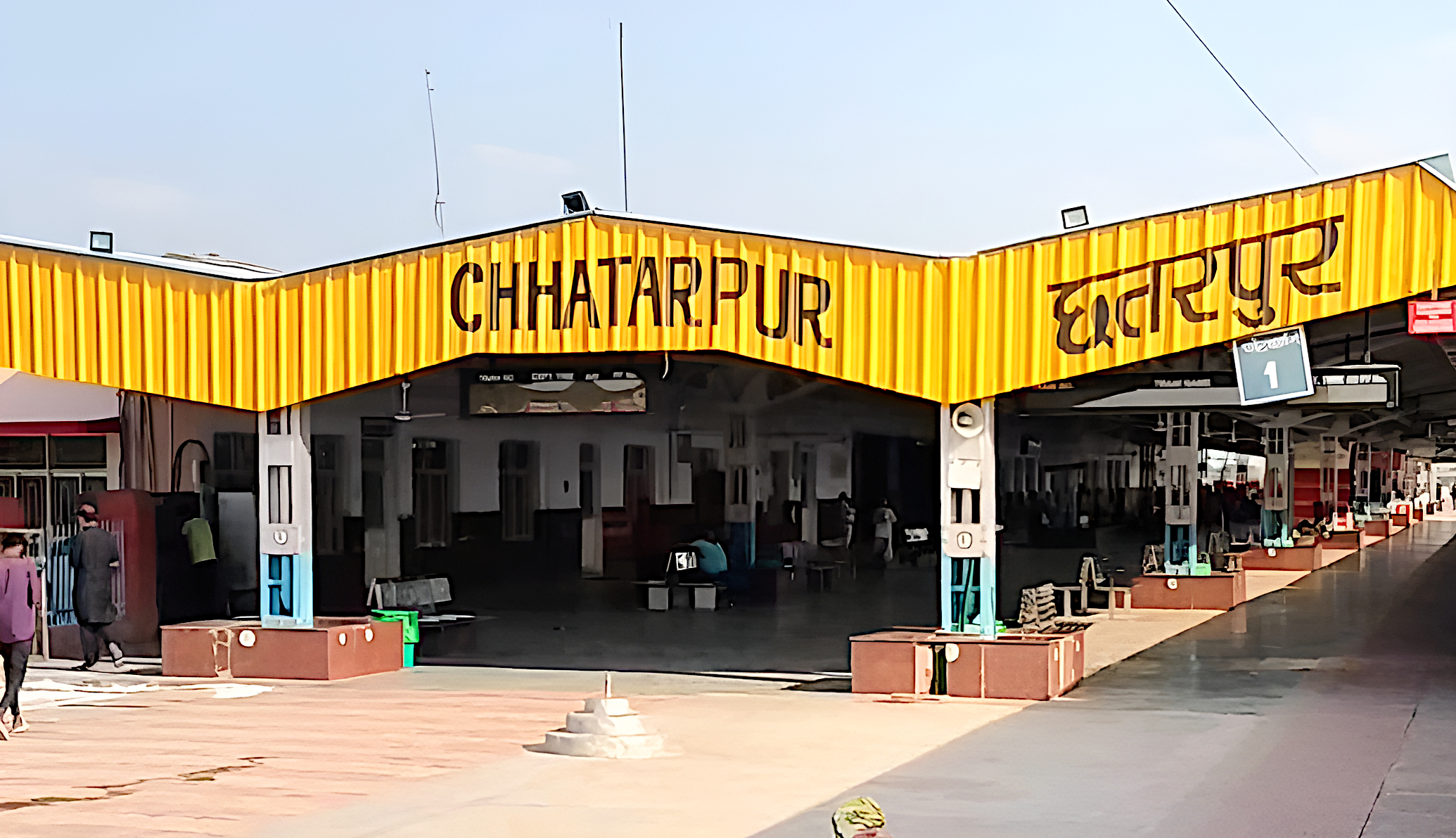
Chhatarpur Railway Station platform

Chhatarpur can be reached by road and railway. Chhatarpur Railway Station opened in 2017, which is connected to Prayagraj, Lucknow, Nagpur, Mumbai, Surat, Ahmedabad, Indore, Bhopal, Delhi, Jaipur, Prayagraj, and Patna. Delhi Vande Bharat also passes through here. The nearest major railway station are Jhansi (130 km) and Satna (140 km).

Chhatarpur is situated on intersection of NH 34 and NH 39. It is 550 km from the national capital Delhi and 330 km from state capital Bhopal. Buses are available for these cities and other nearby regional cities.

Khajuraho Airport is nearest airport, which serves nearby Khajuraho and Chhatarpur but only limited flights are available from here. The closest major airport is Jabalpur and Kanpur.

== Radio and television station ==
Chhatarpur has got its own radio station of All India Radio (आकाशवाणी) under Prasar Bharati. It transmits at 675 kHz. Chhatarpur also has a Doordarshan's Hi power transmitter for TV which is located at Deri Road.

== Tourism ==
=== Religious tourism ===
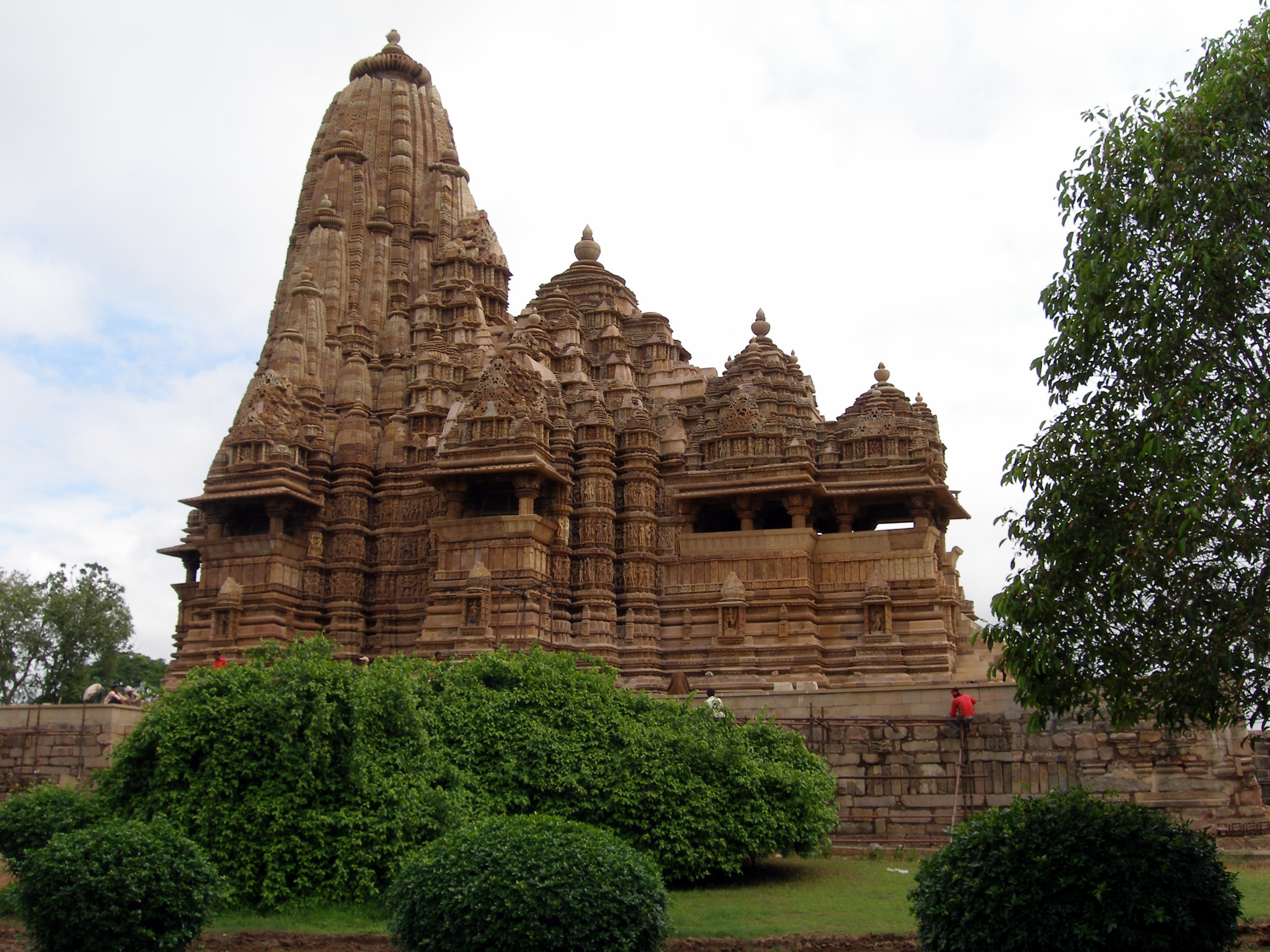
Kandariya Mahadeva Temple, the largest temple in Khajuraho Group of Monuments

- Khajuraho, group of monuments is a group of Hindu temples and Jain temples
- Nainagiri, group of Jain temples built in 11th century
- Hanuman Tauria, a Hanuman temple
- Bambar Baini, Ancient Durga temple of on a hill in Lavkushnagar
- Jatashankar, a cave temple dedicated to Shiva
- Bageshwar Dham, a famous temple dedicated to Lord Hanuman led by Dhirendra Krishna Shastri

=== Nature tourism ===
- Khajwa Kutni Dam, Kutni dam is the largest dam in Chhatarpur district.
- Bhimkund, a natural water tank and a holy place near Bajna
- Raneh Falls, the only waterfall in Asia having igneous rock. It is around 17 km from Khajuraho
- Panna National Park, near Panna district
- Pandav Falls, close to Khajuraho, Pandavas said to have sought shelter here during exile

== Bibliography ==
- J. R. Ackerley, Hindoo Holiday, NYRB Classics, ISBN 978-0-940322-25-7
