= Lavkushnagar =

Lavkushnagar Laundi
- town
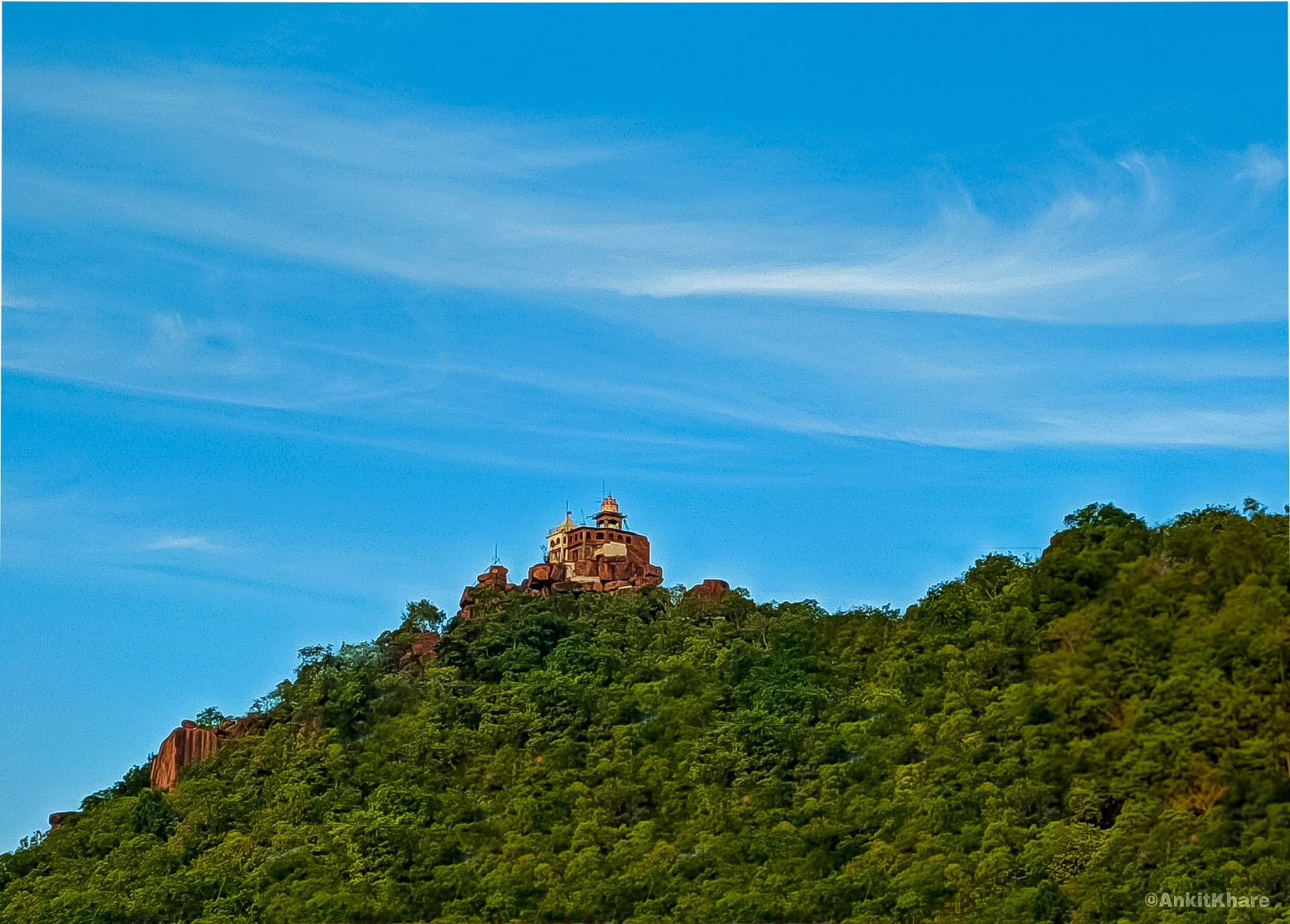
- Mata Bambarbaini Temple in Lavkushnagar

- Location in Madhya Pradesh, India Lavkushnagar (India)
- Coordinates: 25°0′30″N 80°20′31″E
- Country: India
- State: Madhya Pradesh
- District: Chhatarpur

Population (2011)
  - Total: 22,075

Languages
  - Official: Hindi
- Time zone: UTC+5:30 (IST)
- PIN: 471515

Lavkushnagar, formerly known as Laundi and Lavpuri, is a town/tehshil and a nagar panchayat in Chhatarpur district in the Indian state of Madhya Pradesh. It is about 55 km (34 mi) away from Chhatarpur and 37 km (23 mi) from the temple town Khajuraho. The Urmil and Kail Rivers flow through this town. The Civil Airport Khajuraho and Dumra, Harpalpur, and Khajuraho Railway Station are located nearby, and links it to some major towns and cities of Madhya Pradesh. It also has a Civil Court, a Sub Jail, and a police station.

Lavkushnagar is a proposed district by citizen and district headquarters will be in lavkushnagar, chhatarpur, Madhya Pradesh, India.Lavkushnagar, is surrounded by many mountains. The tallest mountain is Mata Bambar Baini Temple mountain. To reach the top of the mountain there are approximately 350–380 stairs

== Demographics ==
As of 2001 India census, Laundi had a population of 20,186. Males constitute 54% of the population and females 46%. Laundi has an average literacy rate of 61%, higher than the national average of 59.5%: male literacy is 69%, and female literacy is 52%. In Laundi, 16% of the population is under six years of ago.

== Geography ==
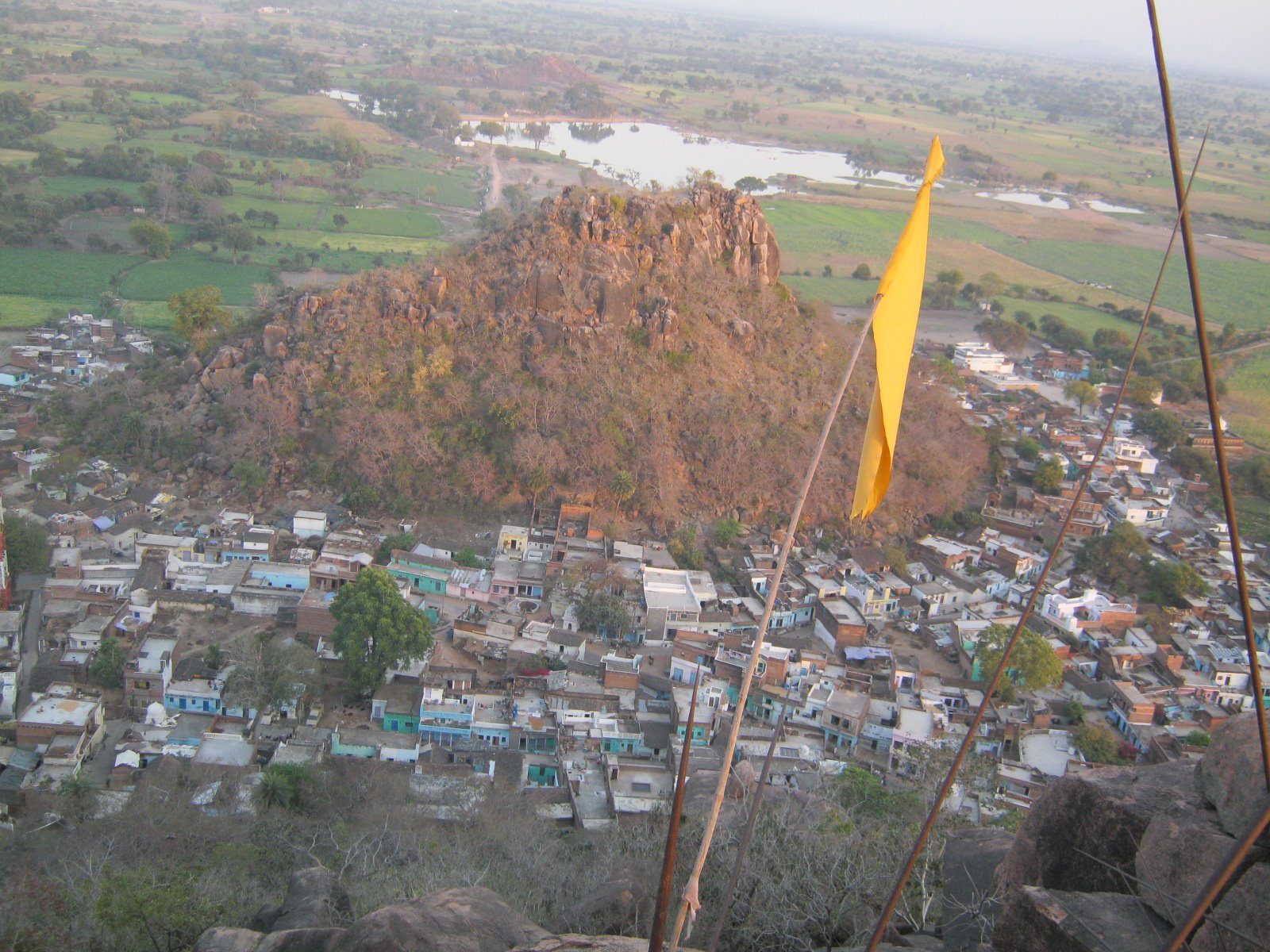
Lavrasur Mountain

Lavkushnagar, is surrounded by many mountains. The tallest mountain is Mata Bambar Baini Temple mountain. To reach the top of the mountain there are approximately 350–380 stairs.
