= Gulganj Fort =

Gulganj Fort is an eighteenth century fort in the Chhatarpur district in Madhya Pradesh. Located at the top of a hill, It is built in the Bundeli architecture style. It was used as a residence and at a same time, also used as a defensive structure. Under British Raj, the fort was used as a local administrative headquarters. The fort is a typical garhi - that is defined in local language as a small fort at top of hill near a source of water hidden in forest or trees and away from the main paths. It is believed that the fort was built by King Sawant Singh for his mistress Gulbai.
