= Chhatarpur district =

- District
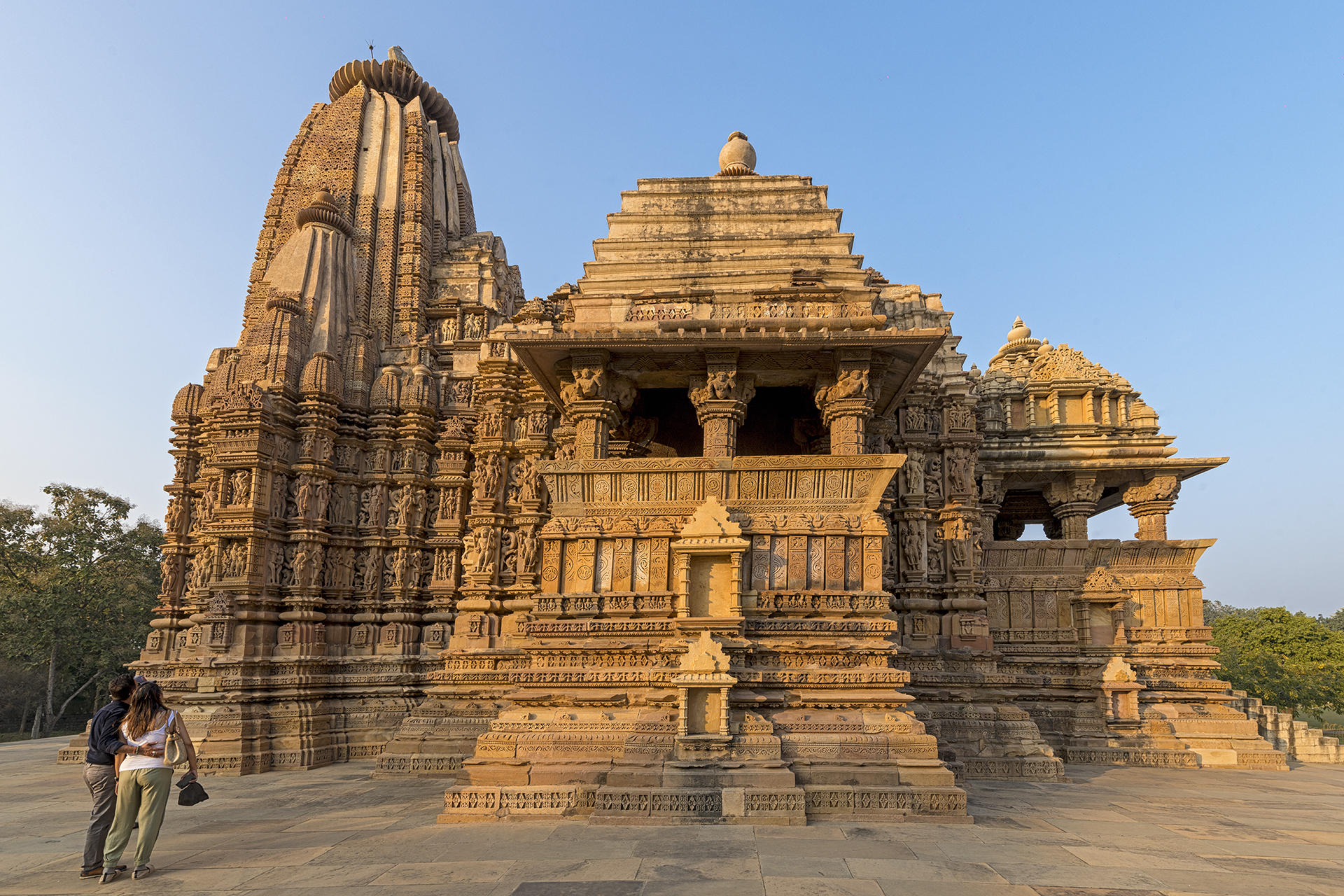
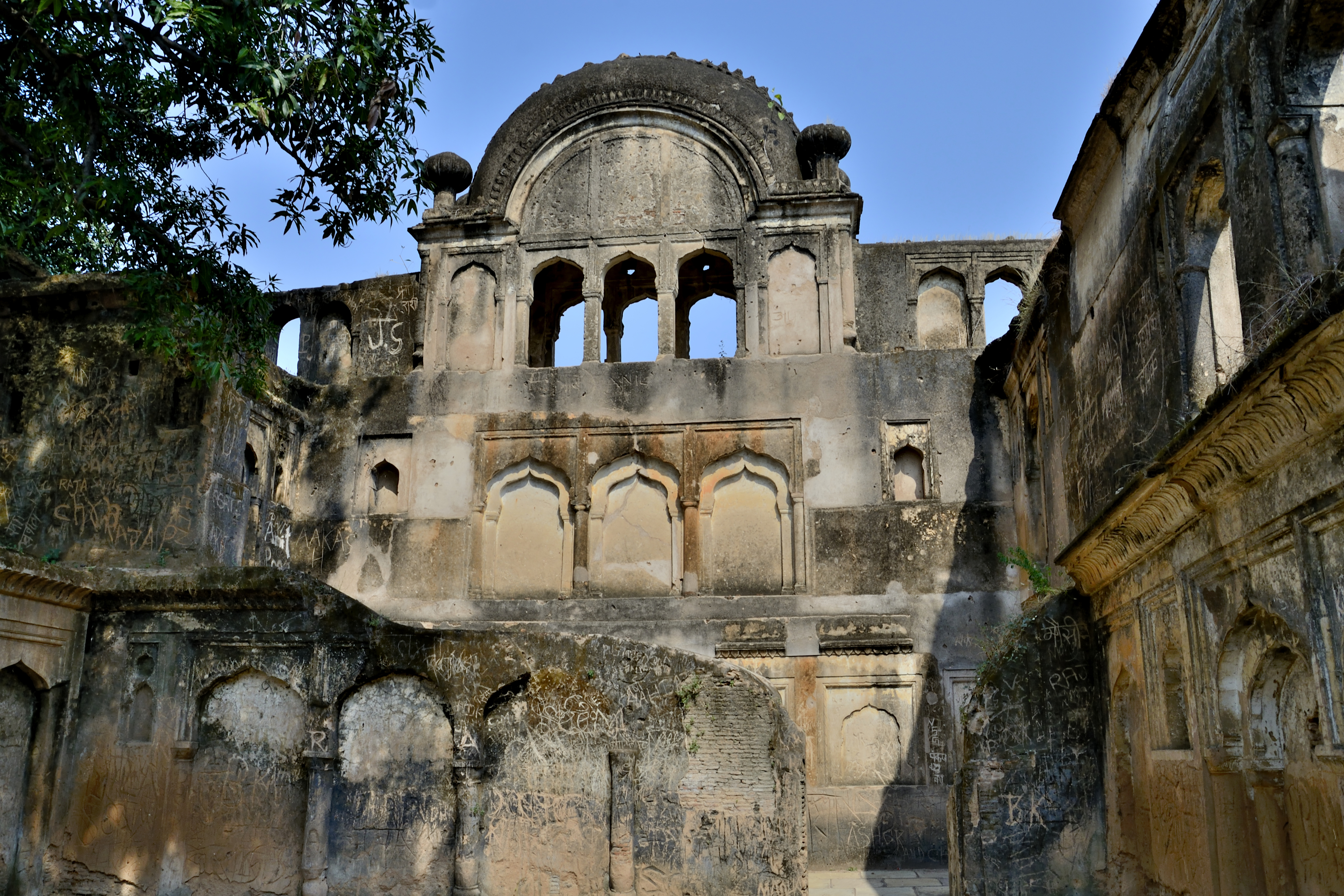
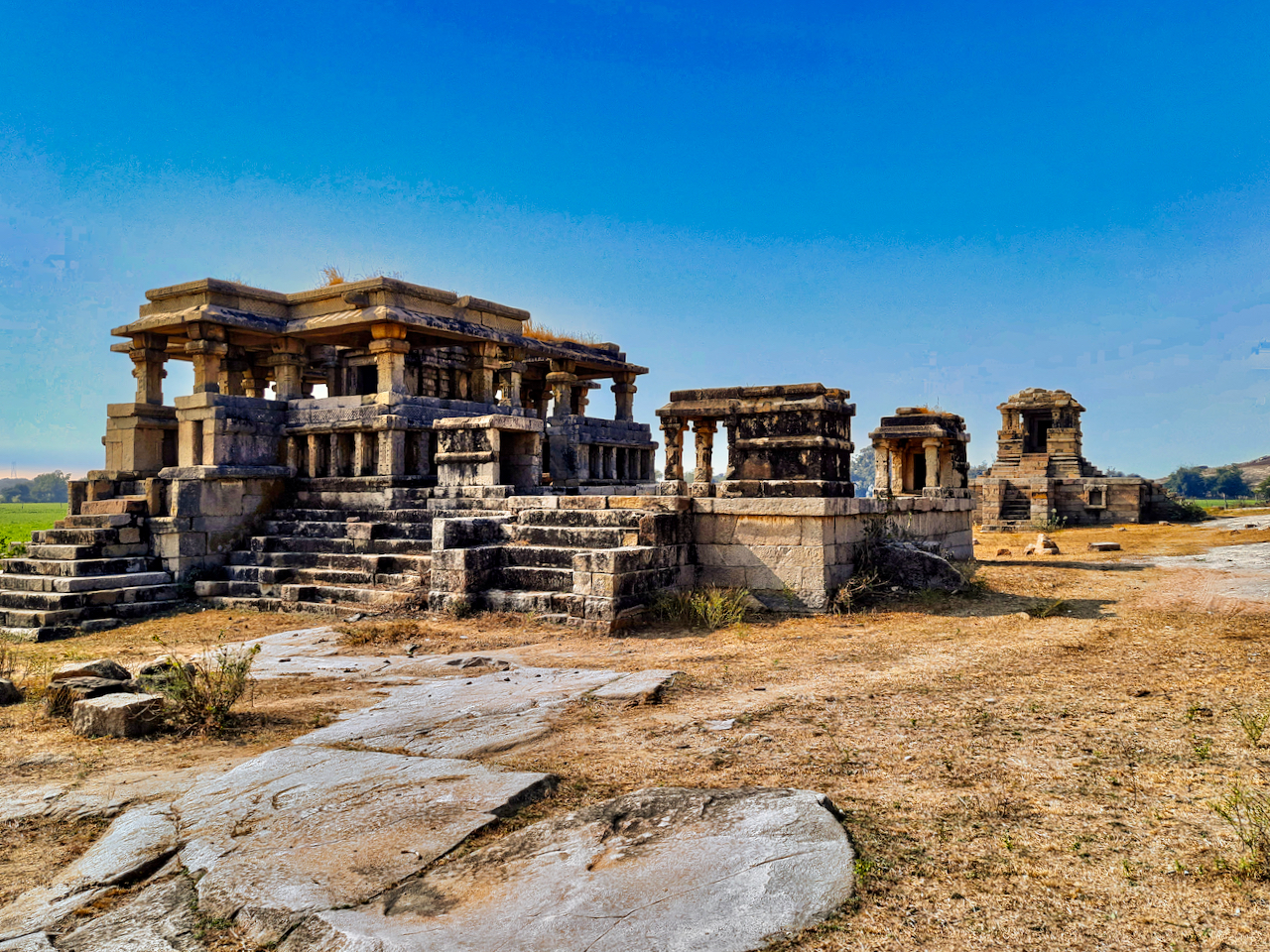
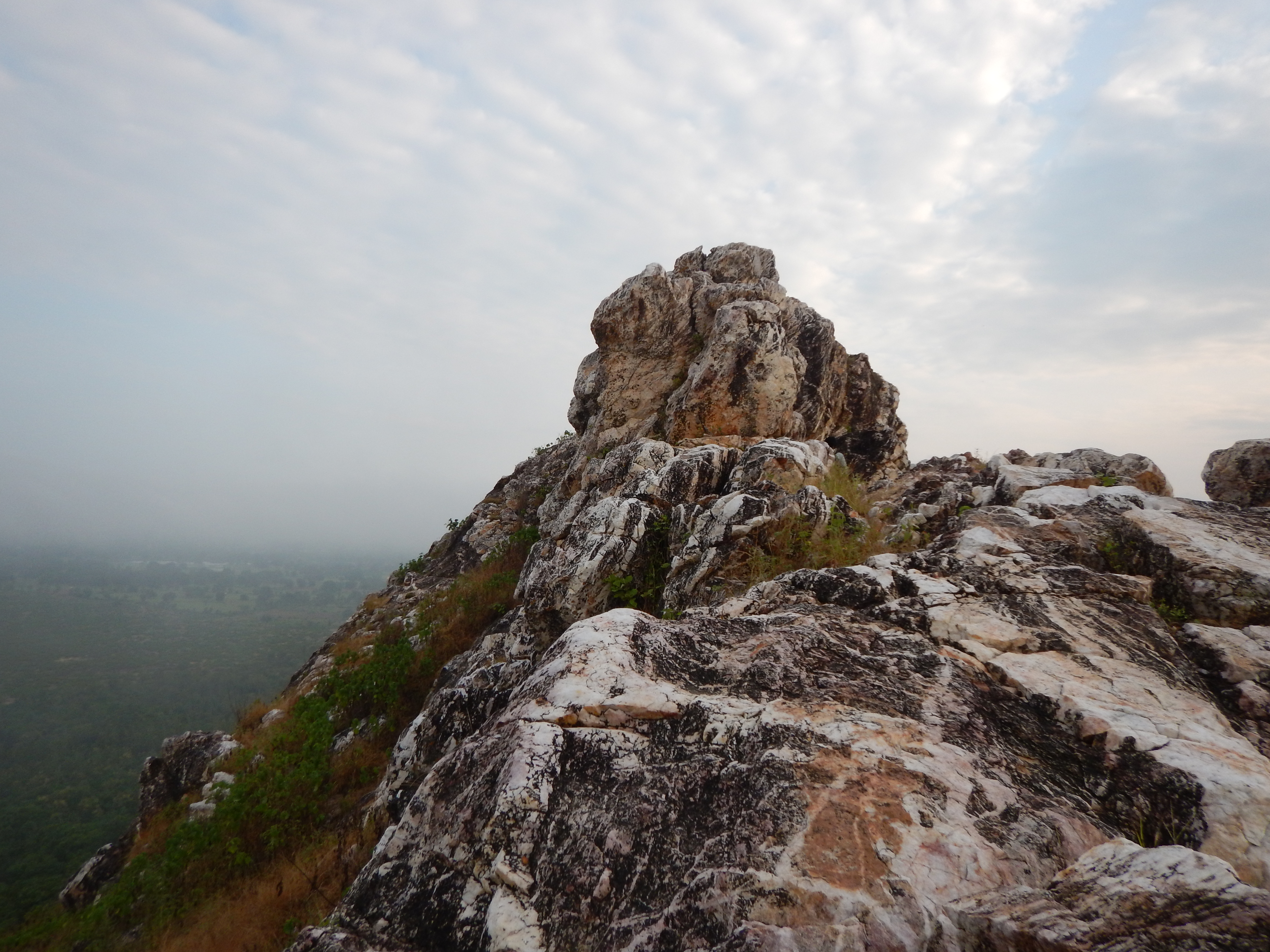
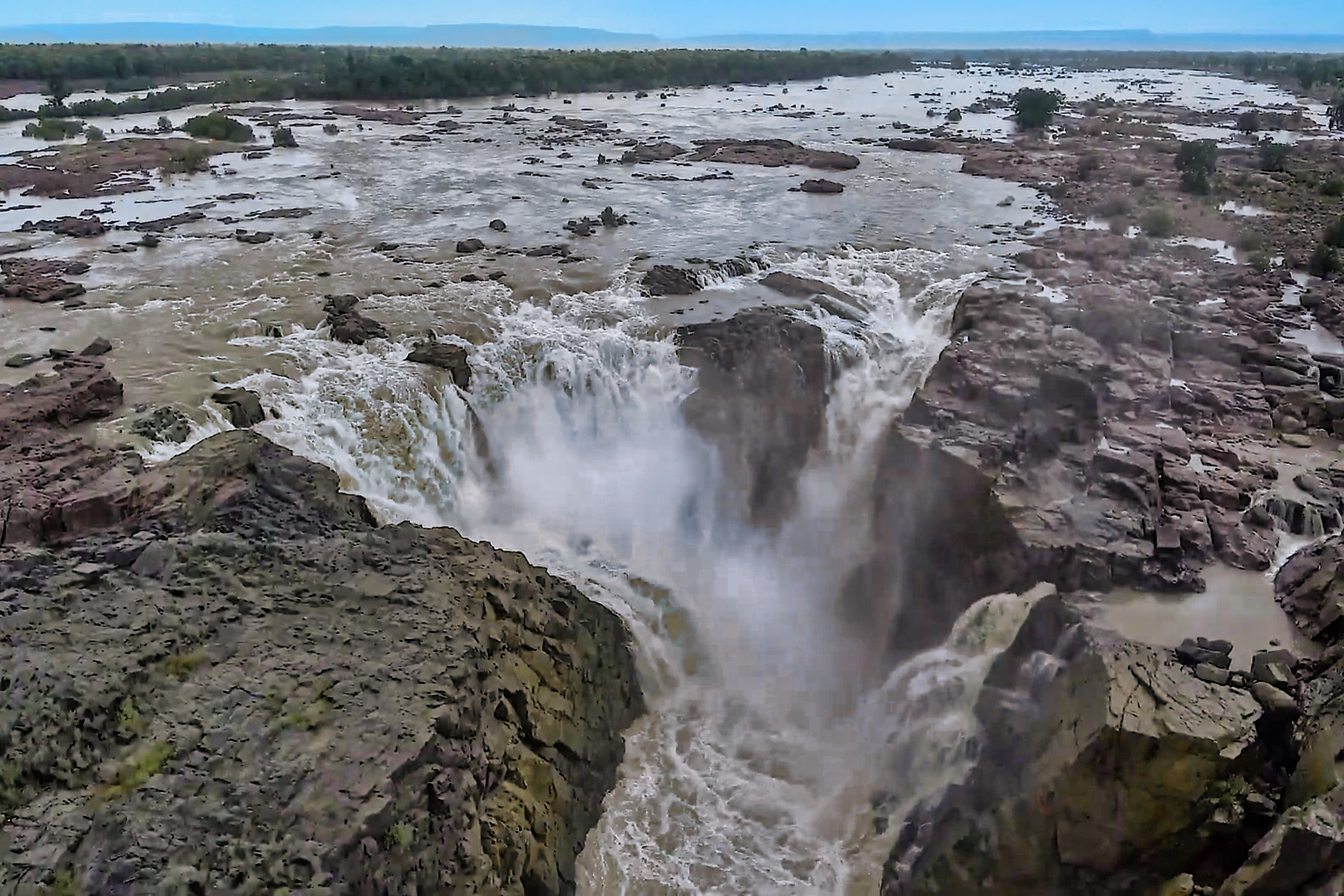
- Clockwise from top-left: Jagdamba Temple at Khajuraho, Mastani Mahal in Dhubela, Dathla Hills, Raneh Falls, Temples in Vyas Badora

- Location of Chhatarpur district in Madhya Pradesh
- Country: India
- State: Madhya Pradesh
- Division: Sagar
- Headquarters: Chhatarpur

Government
  - District Magistrate: Mr. Sandeep G.R IAS
  - Lok Sabha constituencies: Khajuraho Tikamgarh Damoh

Area
  - Total: 8,687 km^{2} (3,354 sq mi)

Population (2011)
  - Total: 1,762,375
  - Density: 202.9/km^{2} (525.4/sq mi)

Demographics
  - Literacy: 64.9 per cent
  - Sex ratio: 884
- Time zone: UTC+05:30 (IST)
- Vehicle registration: MP 16
- Website: chhatarpur.nic.in

Chhatarpur (Hindi pronunciation: [t͡ʃʰət̪əɾpʊɾ]) is a district of the state of Madhya Pradesh in central India. Chhatarpur town is administrative headquarters of this district. Chhatarpur district is famous for Khajuraho World Heritage Site.

== Geography ==
Chhatarpur district located at 24.06° & 25.20°N 78.59° & 80.26° E respectively. The district has an area of 8,687 km². Chhatarpur District is bounded by Uttar Pradesh state to the north, and the Madhya Pradesh districts of Panna to the east, Damoh to the south, Sagar to the southwest, and Tikamgarh to the west. Chhatarpur District is part of Sagar Division. Ken, Dhasan and Urmil is major river of the District.

== Economy ==
It is one of the 24 districts in Madhya Pradesh currently receiving funds from the Backward Regions Grant Fund Programme (BRGF).

== Demographics ==
Historical population
Year	Pop.	±% p.a.
1901	441,124	—
1911	476,507	+0.77%
1921	437,318	−0.85%
1931	434,014	−0.08%
1941	464,041	+0.67%
1951	481,140	+0.36%
1961	587,373	+2.02%
1971	712,385	+1.95%
1981	886,660	+2.21%
1991	1,158,076	+2.71%
2001	1,474,723	+2.45%
2011	1,762,375	+1.80%

Religions in Chhatarpur district (2011)
Religion	Percent
Hinduism	95.15%
Islam	3.99%
Jainism	0.59%
Other or not stated	0.27%

According to the 2011 census Chhatarpur District has a population of 1,762,375, roughly equal to the nation of The Gambia or the US state of Nebraska. This gives it a ranking of 271st in India (out of a total of 707). The district has a population density of 203 inhabitants per square kilometre (530/sq mi) . Its population growth rate over the decade 2001-2011 was 19.54%. Chhattarpur has a sex ratio of 884 females for every 1000 males, and a literacy rate of 64.9%. 22.64% of the population lives in urban areas. Scheduled Castes and Tribes made up 23.00% and 4.18% of the population respectively.

Languages of Chhatarpur district (2011)
1. Bundeli (74.5%)
2. Hindi (24.7%)
3. Others (0.86%)

At the time of the 2011 Census of India, 74.45%% of the population in the district spoke Bundeli and 24.69% Hindi as their first language.

== Administrative Divisions ==
12 tehsil of chhatarpur district

- Chhatarpur
- Rajnagar
- Maharajpur
- Nowgong
- Ghuwara
- Laundi
- Buxwaha
- Gourihar
- Bada Malhera
- Chandla
- Bijawar
- Satai

== Education ==
- Laundi College

== People from Chhatarpur district ==
- Dhirendra Krishna Shastri, Hindu priest
- Satyavrat Chaturvedi - Former MP for Khajuraho
- Asgari Bai - Dhrupad singer and recipient of Padma Shri
- Babu Gulabrai - Hindi writer
- Jeetendra Singh Bundela
- Kranti Goud, Indian Woman Cricketer

== Tourist places ==
- Raneh Fall
- Jatashankar Temple
- Maharaja Chhatrasal Museum
- Bhimkund
- Nainagiri jain temple
- Khajuraho
- Pandav Falls
- Gulganj Fort
- Adinath Temple
- Matangesvara Temple
- Hanuman Tauria
- Kalinjar Fort
- Bambar Baini

== Villages ==
- Mahoi Kalan
- Ramnagar, Chhatarpur

== Geographical indication ==
Mahoba Desawari Pan was awarded the Geographical Indication (GI) status tag from the Geographical Indications Registry, under the Union Government of India, on 14 September 2021 which is valid upto 4 February 2023.

Chaurasiya Samaj Sewa Samiti from Mahoba, proposed the GI registration of 'Mahoba Desawari Pan'. After filing the application in February 2013, the Betel leaf was granted the GI tag in 2021 by the Geographical Indication Registry in Chennai, making the name "Mahoba Desawari Pan" exclusive to the Betel leaf cultivated in the region. It thus became the second Betel leaf variety from India after Mysore Betel Leaf and the 36th type of goods from Uttar Pradesh along with being the 12th type of goods from Madhya Pradesh to earn the GI tag.

The prestigious GI tag, awarded by the GI registry, certifies that a product possesses distinct qualities, adheres to traditional production methods, and has earned a reputation rooted in its geographical origin.
