= Shri Krishna University =

Private university in Madhya Pradesh

- Type: Private
- Established: 2018
- Location: Chhatarpur, Madhya Pradesh, India; 24.837°N 79.522°E
- Mascot: Shri Krishna
- Website: Official website

Shri Krishna University is a private university in Chouka, Sagar Road, Chhatarpur, Madhya Pradesh, India. It was established in 2018.
