= Urmil River =

River in Madhya Pradesh, India

Coordinates: 24°56′22″N 80°04′08″E

The Urmil River is a significant water source in the Chhatarpur district of Madhya Pradesh, India. It flows through the Chhatarpur district, merging with the Ken River.

Urmil River's water is used primarily for drinking, irrigation, and local livestock.

== Dams ==
The Urmil Dam is a joint irrigation project between Uttar Pradesh and Madhya Pradesh, located on the Urmil River. The dam has a height of 18.34 meters and a length of 4.7 kilometers, with a design capacity of 113.50 MCM (Million Cubic Meters).

== Charan Paduka Hatyakand ==
The river holds historical and emotional prominence in the region. Near Singhpur village, along its banks, lies Charan Paduka, a revered pilgrimage site. This location is historically known as the "Jallianwala Bagh of Bundelkhand" because British forces fired upon peaceful freedom fighters gathered on the banks of the Urmil River on January 14, 1931.
