= Hanuman Tauria =

Hill in Chhatarpur, India

Coordinates: 24.911°N 79.580°E

Hanuman Tauria is a location in Chhatarpur, in Chhatarpur district in the state of Madhya Pradesh, India. As the name signifies this is located in one of the longest hills in the heart of the city. It is in front of Kishore Sagar Talab (lake). It is a famous place in Chhatarpur, and many people visit the temple, especially on Tuesdays and Saturdays, because of their devotion to deities such as Hanuman, Sita-Ram, and Shiva. It is just 1 km from Chhatarpur bus stand and one can reach the temple either by stairs or directly by road to the top of the hill.
