= Chhatarpur tehsil =

Location in Madhya Pradesh, India

- Tehsil
- Location in Madhya Pradesh Chhatarpur tehsil (India)
- Coordinates: 24.5500°N 79.3527°E
- Country: India
- State: Madhya Pradesh
- District: Singrauli district

Government
  - Type: Janpad Panchayat
  - Body: Council

Languages
  - Official: Hindi
- Time zone: UTC+5:30 (IST)
- ISO 3166 code: MP-IN

Chhatarpur tehsil is a tehsil in chhatarpur district, Madhya Pradesh, India. It is also a subdivision of the administrative and revenue division of sagar district of Madhya Pradesh.
