= Bhimkund =

Natural water tank and religious site in India

Coordinates: 24.438335°N 79.37608°E

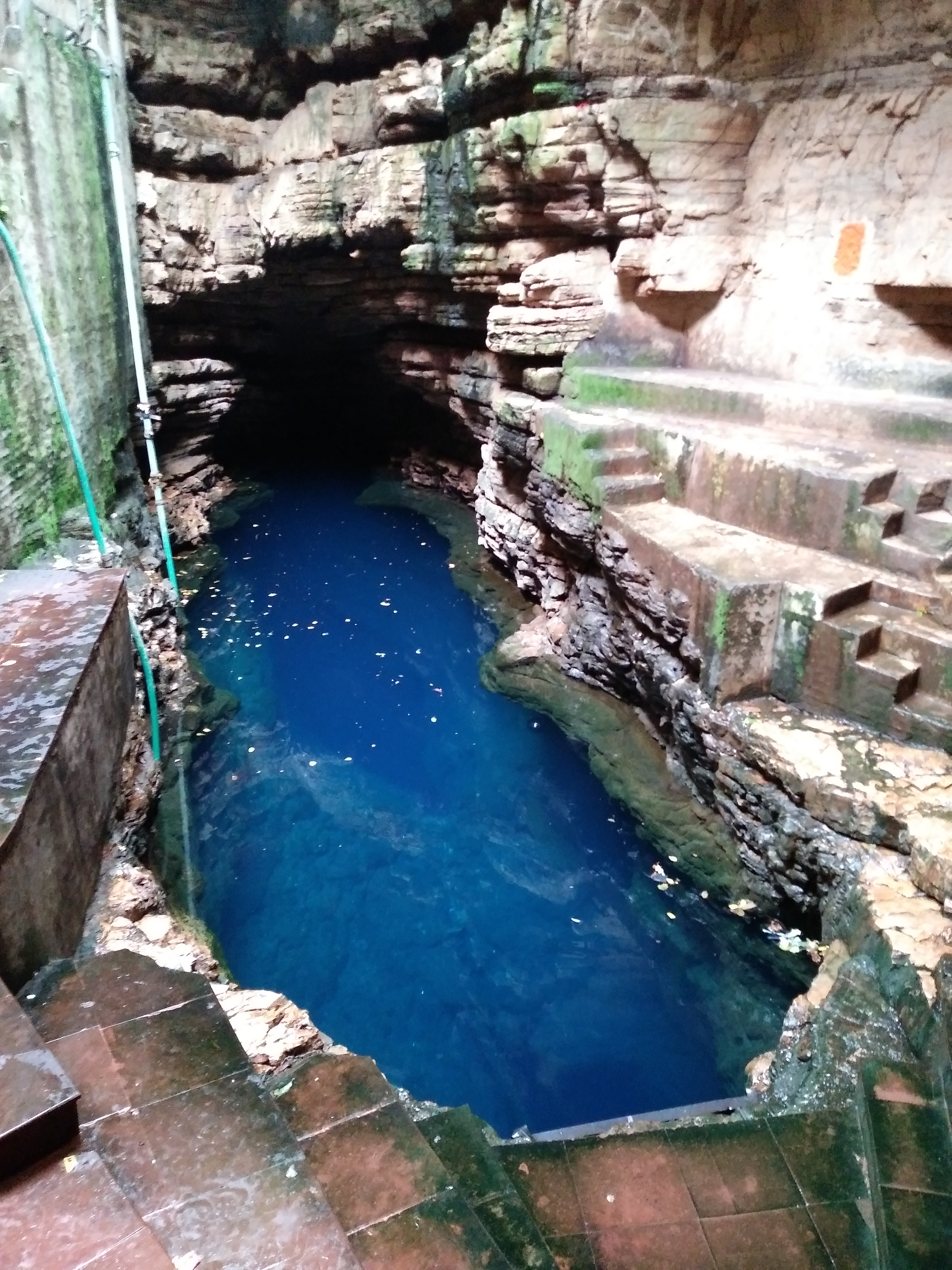

Bhimkund (also known as Neelkund) is a natural water tank considered a holy place in Madhya Pradesh, India, near Bajna village in Chhatarpur district. A legend says that the Vedic sage Narada performed the Gandharva Gaanam (celestial song) in praise of Vishnu. Pleased with his devotion, Vishnu emerged from the kund and the water turned blue because of Vishnu’s dark complexion.
