= Jatashankar =

Cave and Hindu shrine in Madhya Pradesh, India

Coordinates: 22.482°N 78.439°E

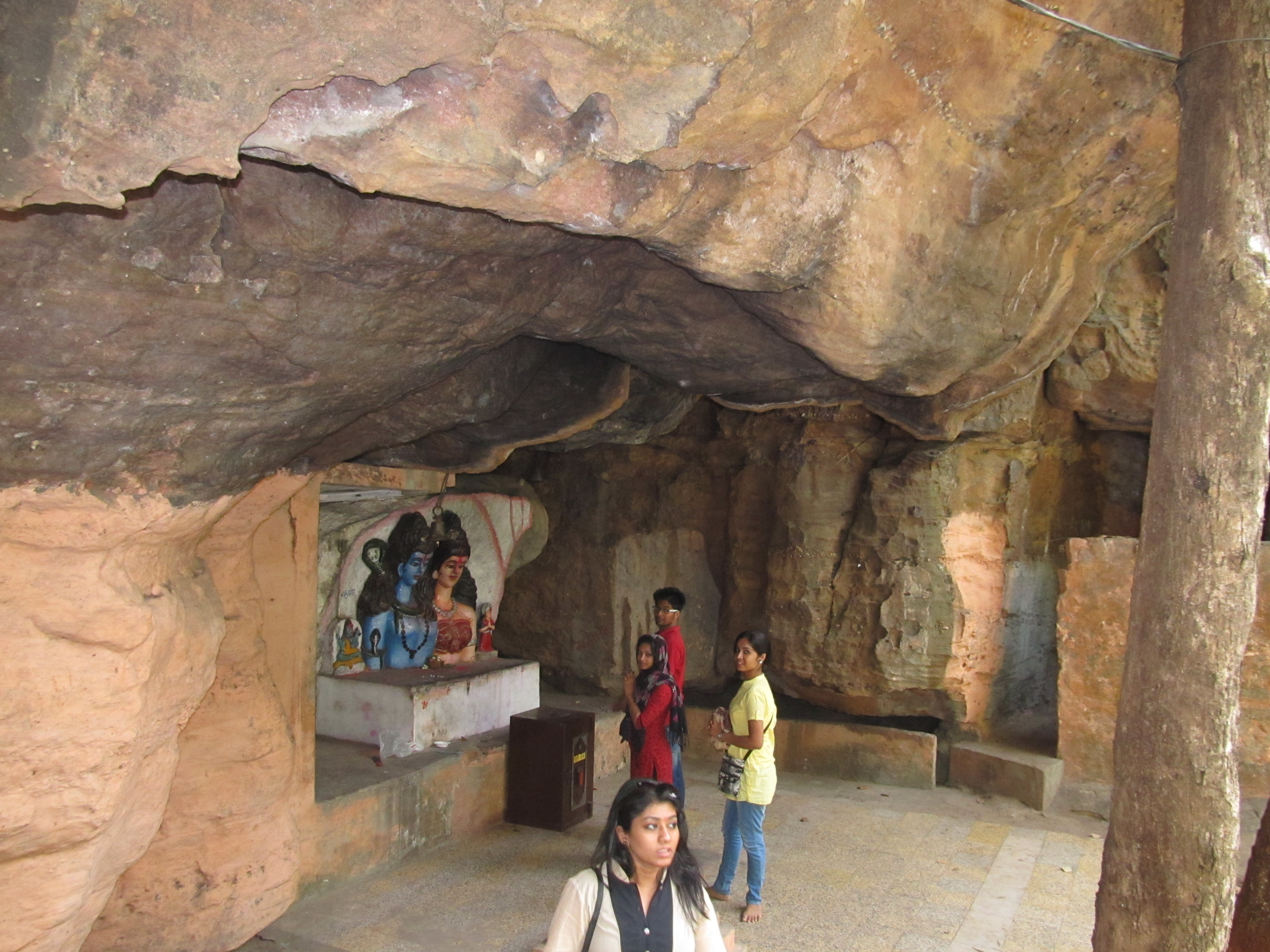

Religion
- Affiliation: Hinduism
- District: Narmadapuram district
- Deity: Shiva

Location
- Location: Pachmarhi
- State: Madhya Pradesh
- Country: India
- Interactive map of Jatashankar

Architecture
- Style: Gupta era

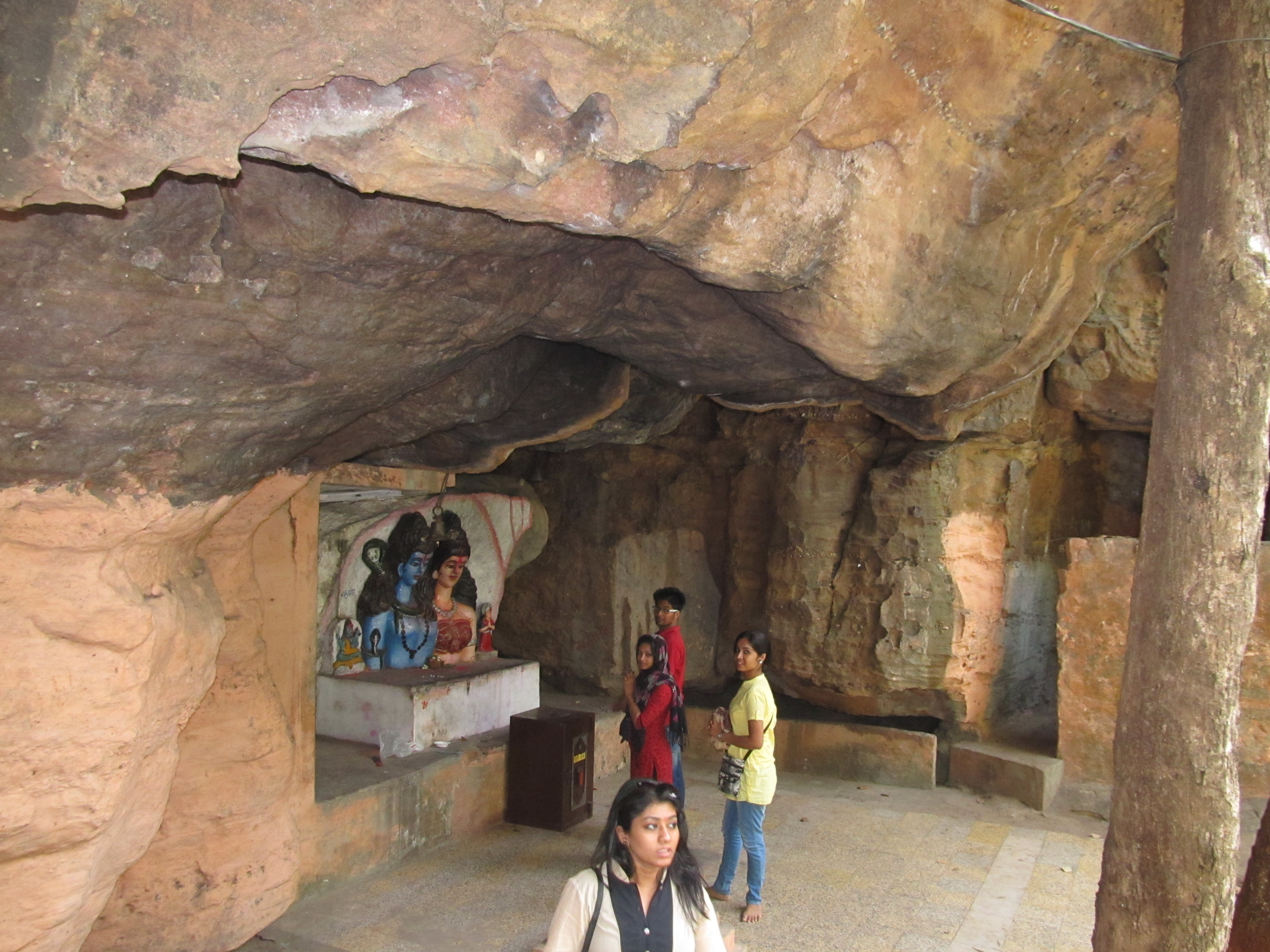
Jatashankar Shiva temple in the mountains of Pachmarhi

Jatashankar (also Jata Shankar) is a natural cave and Hindu shrine located north of Pachmarhi, in Narmadapuram district, Madhya Pradesh, India. Jatashankar is located in a deep ravine with enormous boulders perched above. The cave contains stalagmites which are revered as naturally formed lingams. The cave serves as a shrine to the deity Shiva and is a popular destination for pilgrims. Jata means matted hair and Shankara is another name of Shiva. There are two ponds fed by springs found in the locality, one of cold water and the other one of hot water. The cave structure is said to resemble the hundred-headed Shesha, the serpent-mount of Vishnu.

== Religious Importance ==
According to regional tradition, the Jatashankar caves are considered to be sacred due to their identification with the spot where Shiva is said to have concealed himself from the wrath of Bhasmasura.
