= Government College =

Government College may refer to:

== Bangladesh ==
- Begum Badrunnesa Government Girls' College
- Chittagong College, also called Chittagong Government College
- Comilla Government College
- Govt. Edward College, Pabna
- Government Hazi Mohammad Mohshin College, Chittagong
- Government Physical Education College, Dhaka
- Government Saadat College, Tangail
- Government Science College, Dhaka
- Government Tolaram College, Narayanganj
- Government Unani and Ayurvedic Degree College and Hospital, Dhaka
- Jamalpur Government College
- Kabi Nazrul Government College
- Kurigram Government College
- Lalmonirhat Government College
- New Government Degree College, Rajshahi
- Noakhali Government College
- Narayanganj Government Mohila College
- Government Mohammadpur Model School & College
- Moulvibazar Government College

== India ==
- Government degree colleges in India, public sector educational institutes
- Government Intermediate College, a state-run higher secondary school
- Agartala Government Medical College
- Alagappa Government Arts College, Karaikudi
- Babu Shobha Ram Government. Arts College, Alwar
- Barasat Government College
- Darjeeling Government College
- Diphu Government College
- Dr. Ambedkar Government Law College, Chennai
- Dr. V. M. Government Medical College, Solapur
- Durgapur Government College
- Government Arts College, Coimbatore
- Government Arts College, Kumbakonam
- Government Arts College, Ooty
- Government Arts College, Rajahmundry
- Government Autonomous College, Angul
- Government Autonomous College, Bhawanipatna
- Government College, Ajmer
- Government College, Chittur
- Government College, Sanjauli
- Government College of Art & Craft, Kolkata
- Government College of Education, Chandigarh
- Government College of Engineering, Amravati
- Government College of Engineering, Aurangabad
- Government College of Engineering, Bargur
- Government College of Engineering, Kannur
- Government College of Engineering, Karad
- Government College of Engineering, Salem
- Government College of Engineering & Textile Technology, Berhampore
- Government College of Engineering & Textile Technology Serampore
- Government College of Engineering and Ceramic Technology, Kolkata
- Government College of Engineering and Leather Technology, Kolkata
- Government College of Engineering and Technology, Jammu
- Government College of Fine Arts, Chennai
- Government College of Technology, Coimbatore
- Government Degree College Kathua
- Government Dental College, Bangalore
- Government Engineering College, Ajmer
- Government Engineering College, Bhavnagar
- Government Engineering College, Gandhinagar
- Government Engineering College, Idukki, Painavu
- Government Engineering College, Jhalawar
- Government Engineering College, Kozhikode
- Government Engineering College, Rewa
- Government Engineering College, Thrissur
- Government Engineering College, Wayanad
- Government Girls P.G. College, Chhatarpur
- Government Law College, Calicut
- Government Law College, Ernakulam
- Government Law College, Mumbai
- Government Law College, Thiruvananthapuram
- Government Law College, Thrissur
- Government Maharaja P.G. College, Chhatarpur
- Government Mahila Engineering College
- Government Medical College, Akola
- Government Medical College, Amritsar
- Government Medical College, Anantapur
- Government Medical College, Aurangabad
- Government Medical College, Kota
- Government Medical College, Kottayam
- Government Medical College, Latur
- Government Medical College, Thiruvananthapuram
- Government Medical College, Thrissur
- Government Medical College, Patiala
- Government Nizamia Tibbi College, Hyderabad
- Government Pharmacy College, Bangalore
- Government Polytechnic College, Nagercoil
- Government Sanskrit College, Varanasi
- Government Serchhip College
- Government Victoria College, Palakkad
- Jalpaiguri Government Engineering College
- Jawaharlal Nehru Government Engineering College, Sundernagar
- Jawaharlal Nehru Rajkeeya Mahavidyalaya, Port Blair, Andaman and Nicobar Islands
- Kalyani Government Engineering College
- Kanyakumari Government Medical College
- Maharajah's Government College of Music and Dance
- NJSA Government College, Kapurthala
- P. V. K. N. Government College
- Purulia Government Engineering College
- Quaid-e-Millath Government College for Women
- Ramabai Government Women Post Graduate College, Ambedkar Nagar
- Satish Chander Dhawan Government College For Boys
- Shri Bhausaheb Hire Government Medical College, Dhule
- Shri Kalyan Government College, Sikar
- Shri Vasantrao Naik Government Medical College, Yavatmal
- Silver Jubilee Government Degree College, Kurnool
- Sri C. Achutha Menon Government College
- Taki Government College
- Vedavathi Government First Grade College, Karnataka

== Nigeria ==
- Government College, Ibadan
- Government College Ikorodu
- Government College Umuahia

== Pakistan ==
- Government College University, Lahore, probably the college most frequently referred to by this name
- Government College Hyderabad, Sindh
- Government M.A.O College Lahore
- Adamjee Government Science College, Karachi
- Government College, Pattoki
- Government College Asghar Mall Rawalpindi
- Government College Ground Mirpur
- Government College Muzaffargarh
- Government College University, Faisalabad
- Government College for Men Nazimabad, Karachi
- Government College for Women Dhoke Kala Khan, Rawalpindi
- Government College of Commerce & Economics, Karachi
- Government College of Science, Lahore
- Government College of Technology, Bahawalpur
- Government College of Technology, Faisalabad
- Government Degree College Attock
- Government Khawaja Farid College, Rahim Yar Khan
- Government National College (Karachi)
- Government Post Graduate College Sahiwal
- Government Post Graduate College, Swabi
- Government Post Graduate College For Girls–Chishtian
- Government Premier College, Karachi
- Rana Liaquat Ali Khan Government College of Home Economics
- Sir Syed Government Girls College, Karachi

== See also ==
- Federal Government College (disambiguation)
- Government College for Women (disambiguation)
- Government College of Technology (disambiguation)
- Government College University (disambiguation)
