= Government degree colleges in India =

Public tertiary education institution

Government degree colleges in India are public-sector educational institutes managed primarily through rules and regulations of government accompanied by University Grants Commission (India) (UGC). Education in India has been categorized into elementary, secondary and higher education. The aim behind the formation of the government degree colleges is to provide higher education to undergraduates, postgraduates and doctoral research scholars in various streams and courses recognized by UGC of India. Presently, the standards have been set up for the classifications of the institutes in 2 (f) and 12 (b) category, which is certified by the UGC, New Delhi to maintain the excellence in higher education. The government degree colleges are fully managed by government, either central or at state level, and affiliated to the universities for course structures. Moreover, the government degree college as the institute of higher education, are administered and controlled by the principal, who serves as the head. Teachers (assistant professor, associate professor, and professor) are appointed through Public Service Commissions (a government body under the articles from 315 to 323 of the Constitution of India) of central and state governments. The teachers appointed through the public service commissions are government servants with Group A post and are gazetted in nature. Education is the matter of concurrent lists in India; the government from the centre or from the states has the right to formulate law on higher education.

== Government degree colleges in territories of India ==
=== Andaman and Nicobar Islands ===
- Mahatma Gandhi Government College
- Tagore Government College of Education
- Dr B R Ambedkar Institute of Technology Port Blair

=== Andhra Pradesh ===
- Sir C.R. Reddy Educational Institutions
- Government Arts College, Rajahmundry
- Government Medical College, Anantapur
- Maharajah's Government College of Music and Dance
- P. V. K. N. Government College
- Silver Jubilee Government Degree College

=== Arunachal Pradesh ===
- Dera Natung Government College

=== Assam ===
- Cotton College
- North Lakhimpur College
- Diphu College

=== Bihar ===
- Babasaheb Bhimrao Ambedkar Bihar University
- Bhagalpur College of Engineering
- Indian Institute of Technology
- Rajendra Agricultural University
- Jawaharlal Nehru Engineering College
- Nalanda engineering college, Chandi
- Nalanda University rajgir
- Maulana Azad College of Engineering and Technology
- National Institute of Technology

=== Goa ===
- Government College of Arts, Science and Commerce, Khandola

=== Gujarat ===
- Government Engineering College, Patan
- Government Engineering College, Dahod
- Sardar Vallabhbhai National Institute of Technology, Surat

=== Himachal Pradesh ===
- Jawaharlal Nehru Government Engineering College, Sundernagar
- Government College Solan
- Government College Kumarsain

=== Jammu & Kashmir ===
- Government Degree College, Ganderbal
- Government Degree College Kathua
- Government Degree College Sopore
- Government College of Engineering and Technology, Jammu
- Government Degree College, Bhaderwah
- Government Degree College, Budgam
- Government Degree College, Kalakote

=== Jharkhand ===
Rajendra institute of medical science and research centre

=== Karnataka ===
- Government Dental College, Bangalore
- Government Pharmacy College, Bangalore
- Vedavathi Government First Grade College, Karnataka
- Government Engineering College, Ramanagaram
- Govt First Grade College Ankola,

=== Kerala ===
- Maharaja's College, Ernakulam
- Government Brennen College, Thalassery
- Government College, Chittur
- Government Homoeopathic Medical College, Calicut
- Government Law College, Calicut
- Government College of Engineering, Kannur
- Government Medical College, Kottayam
- Government Engineering College, Idukki, Painavu
- Government Engineering College, Thrissur
- Government Law College, Thrissur
- Government Law College, Thiruvananthapuram
- Government Medical College, Thiruvananthapuram
- Government Medical College, Thrissur
- Government Medical College, Kozhikode
- Government Engineering College, Kozhikode
- Government Engineering College, Wayanad
- Government Law College, Ernakulam
- Government Victoria College, Palakkad
- Sri C. Achutha Menon Government College
- Government TD Medical College Alappuzha

=== Madhya Pradesh ===
- Government Degree College, Bijawar
- Government Engineering College, Jabalpur
- Government Engineering College, Rewa
- Government Girls P.G. College, Chhatarpur
- Government Maharaja P.G. College, Chhatarpur

=== Maharashtra ===
- Dr. V. M. Government Medical College, Solapur
- Government Colleges Hostel, Mumbai
- Government Law College, Mumbai
- Government College of Engineering, Amravati
- Government College of Engineering, Aurangabad
- Government College of Engineering, Karad
- Government Medical College, Aurangabad
- Government Medical College, Akola
- Government Medical College, Latur
- Shri Bhausaheb Hire Government Medical College, Dhule
- Shri Vasantrao Naik Government Medical College, Yavatmal

=== Mizoram ===
- Pachhunga University College, the constituent college of Mizoram University
- Aizawl College
- Zirtiri Residential Science College, Aizawl
- Lunglei College
- Champhai college
- Saiha College
- Government Serchhip College
- Hrangbana College
- Aizawl West College
- J.Thankima College
- T. Romana College
- Saitual College
- Lawngtlai College
- Khawzawl College
- Mizoram Law College
- Regional Institute of Paramedical and Nursing Aizawl
- Mizoram College of Nursing
- National Institute of Electronics and Information Technology, Aizawl
- Higher and Technical Institute of Mizoram

=== Orissa ===
- Government Autonomous College, Angul
- Government Autonomous College, Bhawanipatna
- Government Autonomous G.M. College, Sambalpur
- Panchayat College, Bargarh
- Ravenshaw University, Cuttack

=== Punjab ===
- Government College of Education, Chandigarh
- Government Medical College, Amritsar
- Government Medical College, Patiala
- NJSA Government College, Kapurthala
- Satish Chander Dhawan Government College For Boys
- Govt. Science College, Chatrapur

=== Rajasthan ===
- Babu Shobha Ram Government. Arts College, Alwar
- Government College, Ajmer
- Government Engineering College, Ajmer
- Government Engineering College, Jhalawar
- Government Mahila Engineering College
- Government Medical College, Kota
- Shri Kalyan Government College, Sikar
- Government commerce College, kota

=== Tamil Nadu ===
- CPT, Taramani
- Alagappa Government Arts College, Karaikudi
- Dr. Ambedkar Government Law College, Chennai
- Government Arts College, Coimbatore
- Government Arts College, Kumbakonam
- Government Arts College, Ooty
- Government College of Fine Arts, Chennai
- Government College of Technology, Coimbatore
- Government Law College, Coimbatore
- Government College of Arts & Science (Surandai)
- Government College of Engineering, Bargur
- Government Arts College, Salem
- Government College of Engineering, Salem
- Government College of Engineering, Tirunelveli
- Government Law College, Tiruchirapalli
- Government Polytechnic College, Nagercoil
- Kanyakumari Government Medical College
- Loganatha Narayanasamy Government Arts College, Ponneri
- Quaid-e-Millath Government College for Women

=== Telangana ===
- Government Nizamia Tibbi College, Hyderabad
- Pingle Government Degree College for Women, Warangal
- Forest College and Research Institute, Hyderabad

=== Tripura ===
- Agartala Government Medical College

=== Uttar Pradesh ===
- Government College of Architecture, Lucknow
- Government Sanskrit College, Varanasi
- Institute of Engineering and Technology, Lucknow
- Ramabai Government Women Post Graduate College, Ambedkar Nagar
- SLJB PG College

In Uttar Pradesh, government controlled degree colleges are only 167 in numbers at present for the courses in undergraduate (UG), postgraduate (PG) and doctoral research programs in Humanities (Arts), Science and Commerce streams. The Department of Higher Education of Government of Uttar Pradesh directly controls the institutes through Directorate of Higher Education, Allahabad.

Teachers for the Government Degree Colleges are recruited through Public Service Commission of Uttar Pradesh which is located in Allahabad.

=== Uttrakhand ===
- National Institute of Technology Uttarakhand, Srinagar

=== West Bengal ===
- Darjeeling Government College, Darjeeling
- Acharya Prafulla Chandra Roy Government College, Siliguri, Darjeeling
- Jalpaiguri Government Engineering College, Jalpaiguri
- ABN Seal College, A Govt. College in Coochbehar
- Government College of Engineering and Textile Technology, Berhampore, Murshidabad
- Krishnagar Government College, Nadia
- Durgapur Government College, Burdwan
- Kalyani Govt. Engineering College, Kalyani, Nadia
- Hooghly Mohsin College, Hooghly
- Chandernagore Government College, Hooghly
- College of Textile Technology, Serampore, Hooghly
- Barasat Government College, N-24 Parganas
- Taki Government College, N-24 Parganas
- Bidhannagar College, N-24 Parganas
- Maulana Azad College, Kolkata
- Lady Brabourne College, Kolkata
- Bethune College, Kolkata
- Sanskrit College, Kolkata
- Goenka College of Commerce and Business Administration, Kolkata
- Government College of Engineering and Ceramic Technology, Kolkata
- Government College of Engineering and Leather Technology, Kolkata
- Jhargram Raj College, West Midnapore
- Haldia Government College, East Midnapore
- Government General Degree College, Mangalkote
- Muragachha Government College, Muragachha
- Government General Degree College, Kalna
- Government College of Art & Craft, K
- Kushmandi Government College.
- Government General Degree College, Singur
- Kaliganj Government College, Debagram
- Cooch Behar Government Engineering College
- Katwa college, Katwa, West Bengal
- Ramakrishna Mission Shikshanamandira, Belur Math, Howrah

== See also ==
- Higher education in India
- University Grants Commission (India)
- National Assessment and Accreditation Council
