= GEC =

GEC or Gec may refer to:

== Education ==
- General Educational Certificate
- Glen Eira College, in Caulfield East, Victoria, Australia
- Goa Engineering College, India
- Government Engineering College (disambiguation)
- Guild for Exceptional Children, in New York City, US

== Other uses ==
- Aleksandar Gec (1928–2008), Serbian basketball player
- Gas emission crater, craters in Western Siberia
- General Electric Company, a former British engineering conglomerate
- General entertainment channel, a type of TV or radio channel
- Global Engagement Center, an agency of the US State Department
- Global Environment Centre, Malaysia
- Golden Empire Council, of the Boy Scouts of America
- Gran Enciclopèdia Catalana, a Catalan-language encyclopedia
- Greater Egyptian Conference, an athletics conference in Illinois, US
- Green Electronics Council, US
- Grêmio Esportivo Catanduvense, a former Brazilian football club
- Grounding electrode conductor
- Lufthansa Cargo, a German cargo airline, ICAO code
- Mount GEC, in Jasper National Park, Canada

== See also ==
- 100 Gecs, a musical duo
