= Government College, Faisalabad =

Government College, Faisalabad may refer to:

- Government College of Technology, Faisalabad
- Government Post Graduate Islamia College Faisalabad
- Government College University Faisalabad
- Government Municipal Degree College, Faisalabad
- Government College Women University Faisalabad
- Government College University Faisalabad
