= Government Engineering College =

Government Engineering College or Government College of Engineering refers to one of several engineering colleges located in India:

Name	Founded	City/Town	State/UT
Government Engineering College, Ajmer	1997	Ajmer	Rajasthan
Government Engineering College, Banswara	2012	Banswara	Rajasthan
Government College of Engineering, Amravati	1964	Amravati	Maharashtra
Government College of Engineering, Aurangabad	1960	Aurangabad	Maharashtra
Government College of Engineering, Bargur	1994	Bargur	Tamil Nadu
Government Engineering College, Bhuj	1994	Bhuj	Gujarat
Government Engineering College, Bilaspur	1964	Bilaspur	Chhattisgarh
Government College of Engineering, Dharmapuri	2013	Dharmapuri	Tamil Nadu
Government Engineering College, Gandhinagar	2004	Gandhinagar	Gujarat
Government Engineering College, Hassan	2007	Hassan	Karnataka
Government Engineering College, Idukki	2000	Idukki	Kerala
Government Engineering College, Jabalpur	1947	Jabalpur	Madhya Pradesh
Government Engineering College, Jaffarpur, New Delhi	2007	Jaffarpur Kalan	Delhi
Government Engineering College, Jagdalpur	1983	Jagdalpur	Chhattisgarh
Government Engineering College, Jhalawar	2007	Jhalawar	Rajasthan
Government College of Engineering, Kannur	1986	Kannur	Kerala
Government College of Engineering, Karad	1960	Karad	Maharashtra
Government College of Engineering, Keonjhar	1995	Keonjhar	Odisha
Government Engineering College, Kozhikode	1999	Kozhikode	Kerala
Government Engineering College, Munger	2019	Munger	Bihar
Government Engineering College, Nawada	2019	Nawada	Bihar
Government Engineering College, Palamu	2022	Palamu	Jharkhand
Government Engineering College, Patan	2004	Patan	Gujarat
Government Engineering College Raipur	2006	Raipur	Chhattisgarh
Government Engineering College, Rewa	1964	Rewa	Madhya Pradesh
Government College of Engineering, Salem	1966	Salem	Tamil Nadu
Government Engineering College, Sreekrishnapuram	1999	Sreekrishnapuram	Kerala
Government Engineering College, Thrissur	1957	Thrissur	Kerala
Government College of Engineering, Tirunelveli	1981	Tirunelveli	Tamil Nadu
Government Engineering College, Trivandrum	1999	Trivandrum	Kerala
Government College of Engineering, Vellore	1990	Vellore	Tamil Nadu
Government Engineering College, Wayanad	1999	Wayanad	Kerala
Jalpaiguri Government Engineering College	1961	Jalpaiguri	West Bengal
Jawaharlal Nehru Government Engineering College	2006	Sundernagar	Himachal Pradesh
Kalyani Government Engineering College	1995	Kalyani	West Bengal
Purulia Government Engineering College	2016	Purulia	West Bengal
Cooch Behar Government Engineering College	2016	Cooch Behar	West Bengal
Government Engineering College, Nilokheri	2016	Nilokheri, District- Karnal	Haryana
Rajkiya Engineering College, Azamgarh	2010	Azamgarh	Uttar Pradesh
Government Engineering College, Kottayam	1991	Kottayam	Kerala

== See also ==
- Government College of Technology (disambiguation)
