= Women's education in Pakistan =

Women's education in Pakistan is a fundamental right of every female citizen, according to article Thirty-Seven of the Constitution of Pakistan, However gender discrepancies still exist in the educational sector. According to the 2011 Human Development Report of the United Nations Development Program, approximately twice as many males as females receive a secondary education in Pakistan, and public expenditures on education amount to only 2.7% of the GDP of the country. The unemployment rate of female graduates in Pakistan is approximately 3.8 times higher than that of their male counterparts.

== Gender roles in Pakistan ==
Patriarchal values heavily govern the social structure in Pakistani society, in the rural areas. In comparison, urban centers of the country as well as semi-peripheral regions are slowly moving towards shifting gender roles that are more inclusive. Around 70% of working women in Pakistan work outdoors according to the Asian Development Bank's policy brief on female workforce participation in Pakistan 2016. The general perception of culturally traditional gender— roles specifically, that a woman is expected to take care of the home as wife and mother, whereas the male dominates outside the home as a breadwinner, are questionable in certain sectors. In agricultural work, within rural areas, both men and women work in the fields and are expected to contribute equally to household work. In a survey by the Pakistan Bureau of Statistics 2013–2014, it was reported that 26% of women are in the labor force ( approximately 15 million). There is a traditionally conceptual idea of the segregation of men and women into two distinct worlds. However, this materializes differently in various parts of the country. Only in the most of rural and isolated regions in the country is this idea of gender roles strictly followed. Poverty is one of the major factors in unequal allocation of household resources in favor of sons due to their role in society outside the home. Therefore, education for boys is prioritized over that for girls because it is perceived that boys must be equipped with educational skills to compete for resources in the public arena; while girls are expected to specialize in domestic skills to be good mothers and wives. Hence, education is not perceived as important for girls.

This gender division of labor has been internalized by society, and girls do not have many choices for themselves that could change these patriarchal realities of their lives. Society does not allow girls to develop their human capabilities by precluding them from acquiring an education. The lack of emphasis on the importance of women's education is one of the cardinal features of gender inequality in Pakistan. The Human Development Report (HDR) listed Pakistan in the category of "low human development" countries, with a female literacy rate of thirty percent, and Pakistan has ranked 145 in the world in terms of human development.

=== Importance of women's education ===
Education has been of central significance to the development of human society. It can be the beginning, not only of individual knowledge, information and awareness, but also a holistic strategy for development and change. Education is very much connected to women's ability to form social relationships on the basis of equality with others and to achieve the important social good of self-respect. It is important, as well, for mobility (through access to jobs and the political process) and to health and life (through the connection to bodily integrity).Education serves as protection to domestic violence. Domestic violence is a major factor that negatively affects the advancement of women. One of the significant goals of education for Pakistani women is its contribution to the labor market. Education empowers women to have a voice in the decision-making process in a male-dominated household, limiting men,s to influence on women's involvement in paid jobs that contribute to the country's economy, thus improving Pakistan's status of women. Education can allow women to participate in politics so they can ensure that their voices and concerns are heard and addressed in the public policy. It is also crucial for women's access to the legal system. Although it must be considered that religion and traditions of the Pakistani affect women's education. Some women may choose to keep the traditional roles because that is what they have always known and are used to. It would be a great opportunity if women were able to make their choice on their own, though. They should at least have the knowledge of both sides to be educated or to stay with the traditional ways.

Education is a critical input in human resource development and essential for the country's economic growth. It increases the productivity and efficiency of individuals, and it produces a skilled labor force that is capable of leading the economy towards sustainable growth and prosperity. The progress and wellbeing of a country largely depends on the education choices made available to its people. It can be one of the most powerful instruments of change. It can help a country to achieve its national goals via producing minds imbued with knowledge, skills, and competencies to shape its future destiny.

The widespread recognition of this fact has created awareness on the need to focus upon literacy and elementary education, not simply as a matter of social justice but more to foster economic growth, social well-being, and social stability. Women's education is so inextricably linked with the other facets of human development that to make it a priority is to also make change on a range of other fronts; from the health and status of women to early childhood care; from nutrition, water and sanitation to community empowerment; from the reduction of child labor and other forms of exploitation to the peaceful resolution of conflicts. Education in GB is in a critical state, particularly with regard to the regional government's lack of attention and planning for children's education. There is a glaring absence of policies addressing educational rights.

=== Economic benefits of women's education ===
A large number of empirical studies have revealed that increase in women's education boosts their wages and that returns to education for women are frequently larger than that of men. Increase in the level of female education improves human development outcomes such as child survival, health and schooling. Lower female education has a negative impact on economic growth as it lowers the average level of human capital. Developmental Economists argue that in developing countries female education reduces fertility, infant mortality and increases children's education. Gender inequality in education directly and significantly affects economic growth.

== Gender disparity in education in Pakistan ==
According to UNDP 2010 report, Pakistan ranked 120 in 146 countries in terms of Gender-related Development Index (GDI), and in terms of Gender Empowerment Measurement (GEM) ranking, it ranked 92 in 94 countries. Gender inequality in education can be measured in different ways. Gross and net enrollment rates and completion and drop-out rates are the ways to identify the gender inequality in education. Pakistan aims to achieve Millennium Development Goals and also aimed to eliminate gender disparity at all levels of education by the year 2015. Elimination of gender disparity at all levels of education requires higher allocation of resources on women's education. Strong gender disparities exist in literacy and educational attainment between rural and urban areas of Pakistan.

=== Socio-economic hurdles ===
Patriarchal values are deeply embedded in the society of Pakistan, and their different manifestations are observed in various aspects of the society. As mentioned above,the gender division of labour enforces women to primarily specialize in unpaid care work as mothers and wives at home, whereas men perform paid work, and emerge as breadwinners. This has led to a low level of resource investment in girls' education, not only by their families but also by the state. This low investment in women's human capital, compounded by negative social biases and cultural practices, restrictions on women's mobility and the internalization of patriarchy by women themselves, becomes the basis for gender discrimination and disparities in most spheres of life. Some of the ramifications are that women are unable to develop job-market skills, hence, they have limited opportunities available to them in the wage labour market. Moreover, social and cultural restrictions limit women's chances to compete for resources in a world outside the four walls of their homes. It translates into social and economic dependency of women on men. The nature and degree of women's oppression and subordination vary across classes, regions and the rural and urban divide in Pakistan. It has been observed that male dominant structures are relatively more marked in the rural and tribal setting where local customs and indigenous laws establish stronger male authority and power over women.

=== Insurgency hurdles ===
Destruction of schools and killings have harmed women's education in Pakistan. sixteen-year-old education activist and blogger Malala Yousafzai was shot in the head and neck by Taliban insurgents on October 9, 2012, after she had blogged about the destruction of schools and closing of all-girls schools in her town of Mingora in the Swat District. Later, the Taliban denied that it opposes education and claimed, "Malala was targeted because of her pioneering role in preaching secularism and so-called enlightened moderation."

In September 2012, the Pakistani newspaper Dawn reported that 710 schools had been destroyed or damaged by militants in Khyber Pakhtunkhwa and 401 schools had been destroyed or damaged in Swat. While the Taliban's campaign extends beyond girls to secular education in general, at least one source reports that damage was related to Taliban opposition to girls' education. Another source includes the bombing of girls' schools as among the Taliban policies.

=== Barriers to a Higher Education ===
Although education for women in Pakistan is a right since 1976 there is still a sizable gender gap, specifically in higher education for women. From data collected in 2003-2004 enrollment of women in bachelor's degree programs was 43.5% as compared to their male counterparts who had an enrollment of 56.49%. Furthermore, in a study by Monazza Aslam it was concluded that an investment in women's education has a higher economic return than that of male education, and yet there is little importance put on women's education. This is due to the societal expectations and the value of women in Pakistan.

The path to a higher education for women is rigorous and doesn't yield the same results as that of a man. Firstly, women are viewed as housewives and mothers, they are set aside for one purpose – making their education the least important concern for their families. Additionally, the decision to obtain an education is not up to women in Pakistan, their families whether it be their parents or their spouse get to decide the fate of their women. Since women are groomed for marriage their families are often concerned with teaching them household chores so that they can please their spouses and new families. If a daughter is given the opportunity to a higher education her family is often using it as a 'golden bracelet.' Research on the marriage market in Pakistan has found that more highly educated women receive greater marital assets (dowry and brideprice), which can increase their bargaining power within marriage. Furthermore, a man's education is valued above a woman's due to the gender norms in Pakistan as well as the non-existent social security. Sons are expected to work and someday financially support their parents, while daughters are expected to marry into another family. These gender norms motivate parents to fund their son's education while focusing on their daughter's dowry. These gender norms, along with the price of higher education and the lack of women's and coed schools, restrict women's ability to receive a higher education. Obtaining a higher education is not an easy path. If a woman is married she is still expected to take care of her family and many women in Pakistan are not allowed to work outside of their homes, making it very difficult to get a job. Furthermore, even after jumping over all the obstacles once a woman obtains a higher education she has to deal with the gender discrimination in the workplace, and many women will find that it is not easy to find well paid or managerial jobs even with a college degree.

=== Rural vs. urban ===
In year 2021, the literacy rate in urban areas was recorded as 80% while in rural areas it was 55%, and only 42% among rural women. An interesting factor in this context is that female enrollment was recorded highest at the primary level, but it progressively decreases at the secondary, college and tertiary levels. It was estimated that less than 3% of the 17–23 age group of girls have access to higher education.

The number of women who attend school in urban areas vs. rural areas differs drastically. In urban areas, women's education is increasing every day. The parents of girls who live in urban areas are a lot more accepting of their enrolling in school and even encourage girls to pursue a career as they are also a lot more knowledgeable of their rights. This makes them a lot more motivated to stand up for their education. Parent in urban areas are a lot more modernized or westernized. These urban parents acknowledge the importance of an education. Women who live in urban areas are often enrolled in private schools getting a better education there as they have a lot more educational accessibility. Women in urban areas are also surrounded by people who are educated and are not put down or beaten for going to school. Unlike in urban areas, women in rural areas are discouraged to attend school. Most of them are brought up in conservative families with little to no education. They have to work harder than women in urban areas because they have little support system. If their parents are accepting of education they still cannot go since most of them are very poor and cannot afford the expense. The women also do not attend school in rural areas of Pakistan because it is not culturally accepted. The perspective of rural Pakistani parents about education continues to change. Many parents acknowledge the real benefits of obtaining a higher education: women's control and empowerment. In contrast, some parents still view education as a way to attract a better marriage. These conservative families tend to be more traditional expecting women to stay at home and attend the house while men go out to work. They're also restricted in rural areas because their town may not even have a school, therefore having to travel a long distance to attend one.

== Statistics ==
The latest official statistics on enrollment that are provided by the Ministry of Education of Pakistan are of year 2005–2006. The statistics can be divided into two categories, public schools and private schools.

=== Pre-primary ===
Public sector

According to the government of Pakistan, total enrollment level of pre-primary in public sector was 4,391,144. Out of 4,391,144 pre-primary students, 2,440,838 are boys, and 1,950,306 are girls. It shows that 56% of enrolled students are boys, and 44% are girls. Further breakdown of these statistics into urban and rural enrollment levels reveals almost similar percentage of enrollment among boys and girls, i.e. in rural schools 57% are boys and 43% are girls.

Private sector; There is a huge sector of private education in Pakistan. According to the government of Pakistan, 2,744,303 pre-primary students are enrolled in private schools. Among them, 1,508,643 are boys, and 1,235,660 are girls. It shows that 55% of enrolled kids are boys and 45% are girls. Of the total number, 39% students are in rural areas, and the percentage of enrolled boys and girls in rural areas are 58% and 42% respectively.

=== Primary education ===
Primary education is compulsory for every child in Pakistan, but due to culture, poverty, and child labour, Pakistan has been unable to achieve 100% enrollment at the primary level.

Public sector

The total enrollment in primary public sector is 11,840,719; 57% (6,776,536) are boys, and 43% (5,064,183) are girls. 79% of all the primary students in Pakistan are enrolled in rural schools, and the gender enrollment ratios are 59% and 41% for boys and girls respectively in rural Pakistan.

Private sector

The private schools are mostly located in urban centers, and the total enrollment in private primary schools was 4,993,698.

=== Middle school level ===
The enrollment level falls dramatically from primary to middle school level in Pakistan. These statistics can be very helpful in comprehending the problems faced by Pakistan in its educational sector.

Public sector

3,642,693 students are enrolled in public middle schools; 61% (2,217,851) are boys, and 39% (1,424,842) are girls. Of the total enrollment, 62% students are in rural areas, and the enrollment of girls are much lower in rural middle schools vis-à-vis urban schools. In rural schools, 66% enrolled students are boys and 34% are girls.

Private sector

The enrollment in private schools declines sharply after primary level, as the cost of attendance in private schools increases and the majority of the population cannot afford private education in Pakistan. The total number of students enrolled in private schools at middle level is 1,619,630. Of the total level of enrollment in private schools, 66% students are in urban schools. Hence, the ratio of boys and girls is relatively balanced with 54% boys and 46% girls.

=== High school level ===
In Pakistan grades 8 to 10 constitute high school education.

Public sector

The total number of students enrolled in public high schools is 1,500,749. The 61% of students are boys and 39% are girls. Overall enrollment decreases sharply at high school level. A very disproportionate gender ratio is observed in rural high schools, only 28% of the enrolled students are girls, and 72% are boys.

Private sector

632,259 students are enrolled in private high schools. Most of them are in urban centers. The ratio of boys and girls enrollment is 53% and 47% respectively.

=== Higher secondary ===
The overall ratio seems to equalize among boys and girls in higher secondary education.

Public sector

There are about 1.2 million students enrolled in higher secondary education in Pakistan during the 2023-2024 academic cycle, across state-run institutions. At the national level, there is near parity in enrolment between genders: 49 percent males and 51 percent females. However, the urban-rural divide is significant. Only about 22 percent of these students are rural area, and among them, female enrollment drops to 31 percent. Urban centers, on the other hand, have greater female participation, with more than 56% of the students identifying as female. This indicates that there is still a need to narrow the gap in access to higher learning in terms of both gender and geography.

Private sector

154,072 students are enrolled in private higher secondary institutions, with 51% boys and 49% girls.

=== Degree level education ===
Female students outnumber their male counterparts in degree level education.

Public sector

There are only 296,832 students enrolled in degree level education in public sector institutions, and 62% of them are female while 38% are male. Very few (less than 1%) students are in rural institutions.

Private sector

29,161 students are enrolled in private sector institutions; 4% are female, mostly in urban city centers.

=== Summary of statistics ===
These statistics shed some interesting facts about education in Pakistan; the gender disparity in education is much lower in urban places vis-à-vis rural areas. One of the possible explanations of this pattern is relatively stronger dominance of tribal, feudal and patriarchal traditions in rural areas. Moreover, there are very few employment opportunities for women in rural areas, and thus, there is very little financial incentive for families to send their girls to schools. However, despite the meagre representation of females in the education sector, the level of achievement of female students is consistently far higher than that of their counterpart male students. Girls generally outclass boys in examination, and they are also higher achievers in universities. Unfortunately, the majority of the girls never get an opportunity to develop their educational capabilities.

== All-female madrassas ==
There are almost 2,000 registered Islamic religious schools for girls, educating almost a quarter of a million young women and providing more than half of the candidates sitting graduate-level exams every year.

== Role of government in women's education ==
Officially the government of Pakistan is committed to provide every citizen an access to education, but critics say that its budget allocation towards education does not correspond with its former commitment. The expenditure on education as a percentage of GDP was 1.82% in 2000–2001, while it has been raised slightly in 2006–2007 to 2.42%, and it is still relatively lower than most neighboring countries. Feminist economists argue that the government of Pakistan needs to fully address and resolve the gender concerns that exist in the educational sector. They suggest that one of the ways to improve this situation is by increasing funding for women's education, encourage and financially incentivize people in the rural areas to send their girls to schools. In the apprentice of gender studies, the gender division of labor is considered patriarchal, and feminists argue that it can be consciously neutralized by the public policies, i.e. encouraging girls to study mathematics, science, computers, and business administration etc. This way, girls will specialize in higher paying fields (jobs) instead of solely focusing on care work.

== Role of parents ==
In 2016, parents seized the initiative by sending their daughters to what has become a co-education school in Mangar Kota, Swat. The village has only one primary school for girls, with just one teacher. The nearest secondary school is 12 kilometres away. The only way for girls to continue their education was to attend a boys school. Inspired by Malala Yousafzai the parents of 8 girls have enrolled their daughters in a boys school.

Parents are often reluctant to send their daughter's to school due to distance, poor infrastructure, safety and security concerns, and lack of facilities such as bathrooms in schools. This is a particular concern in rural areas where there is low provision of schools for females.

A mother's education is an important factor that influences their children's opportunities and education attainment. This can also be considered a barrier for new generations, continuing the cycle of women not achieving a higher education. A Pakistan's girl school attainment increases by one-third to one-half more per one year of the formal mother's education. Approximately half of the population in Pakistan are women; a country would not be able to advance if half of its citizens are limited to higher education.

== Conclusion ==
Statistics show that education in Pakistan can be characterized by extensive gender inequalities. Girls/women have to face socio-cultural hurdles to acquire education. International community has developed a consensus through the Millennium Development Goals to eliminate gender inequality from education. The proponents of gender equality argue that it is not only humane and ethical thing to provide everyone easy access to education without any gender bias, but it is also essential for development and progress of a society that both men and women are educated. They also point towards empirical studies that have confirmed that gender inequality in education has significant impact on rural poverty in Pakistan, and female literacy is important for poverty alleviation. Feminists like Martha Nussbaum are arguing that there is an immediate need to increase the public expenditures on female education in order to achieve gender equality at all levels.

== See also ==
- Women in Pakistan
- Women's rights
- Government College of Women
- Government Degree Girls College
