= SCET =

SCET may refer to:

- Sarvajanik College of Engineering and Technology, Surat, India
- Scottish Council for Educational Technology, see Learning and Teaching Scotland
- Shadan College of Engineering and Technology, Hyderabad, Andhra Pradesh, India
- Soft-collinear effective theory
- Spacecraft Event Time
