= GCU =

GCU may refer to:

== Education ==
- Georgian Court University, in Lakewood, New Jersey, United States
- Glasgow Caledonian University, in Scotland, United Kingdom
- Government College Umuahia, a secondary school in Nigeria
- Government College University (disambiguation)
- Grand Canyon University, in Phoenix, Arizona, United States
- Great Cities' Universities, an American research-sharing association

== Other uses ==
- Alanine, an amino acid used in the biosynthesis of proteins which may be encoded by GCU
- General Contact Unit, a class of fictional artificially intelligent starship in The Culture universe of late Scottish author Iain Banks
- Greek Catholic Union of the USA, known as GCU
