= Gujarat Technological University =

State university in Gujarat, India

Gujarat Technological University (International Innovative University)
- Other name: GTU
- Type: Government (Public)
- Established: 2007; 19 years ago
- Accreditation: NAAC
- Affiliations: UGC; AICTE
- Chancellor: Governor of Gujarat
- Vice-Chancellor: Vaibhav D. Bhatt (I/C)
- Location: Nr. Vishwakarma Government Engineering College, Nr. Visat Three Roads, Visat - Gandhinagar Highway, Chandkheda, Ahmedabad, Gujarat, 362424, India; 23.1059°N 72.5938°E
- Campus: Urban
- Website: www.gtu.ac.in

Gujarat Technological University (International Innovative University), commonly referred as GTU, is a public state university affiliating many engineering, pharmacy, and management colleges in Gujarat, India. The university is headed by the state government and came into existence on 16 May 2007. Engineering institutes such as Lalbhai Dalpatbhai College of Engineering, Birla Vishvakarma Mahavidyalaya, Vishwakarma Government Engineering College, Gujarat Technological University School of Engineering and Technology and many government engineering colleges are a part of GTU.

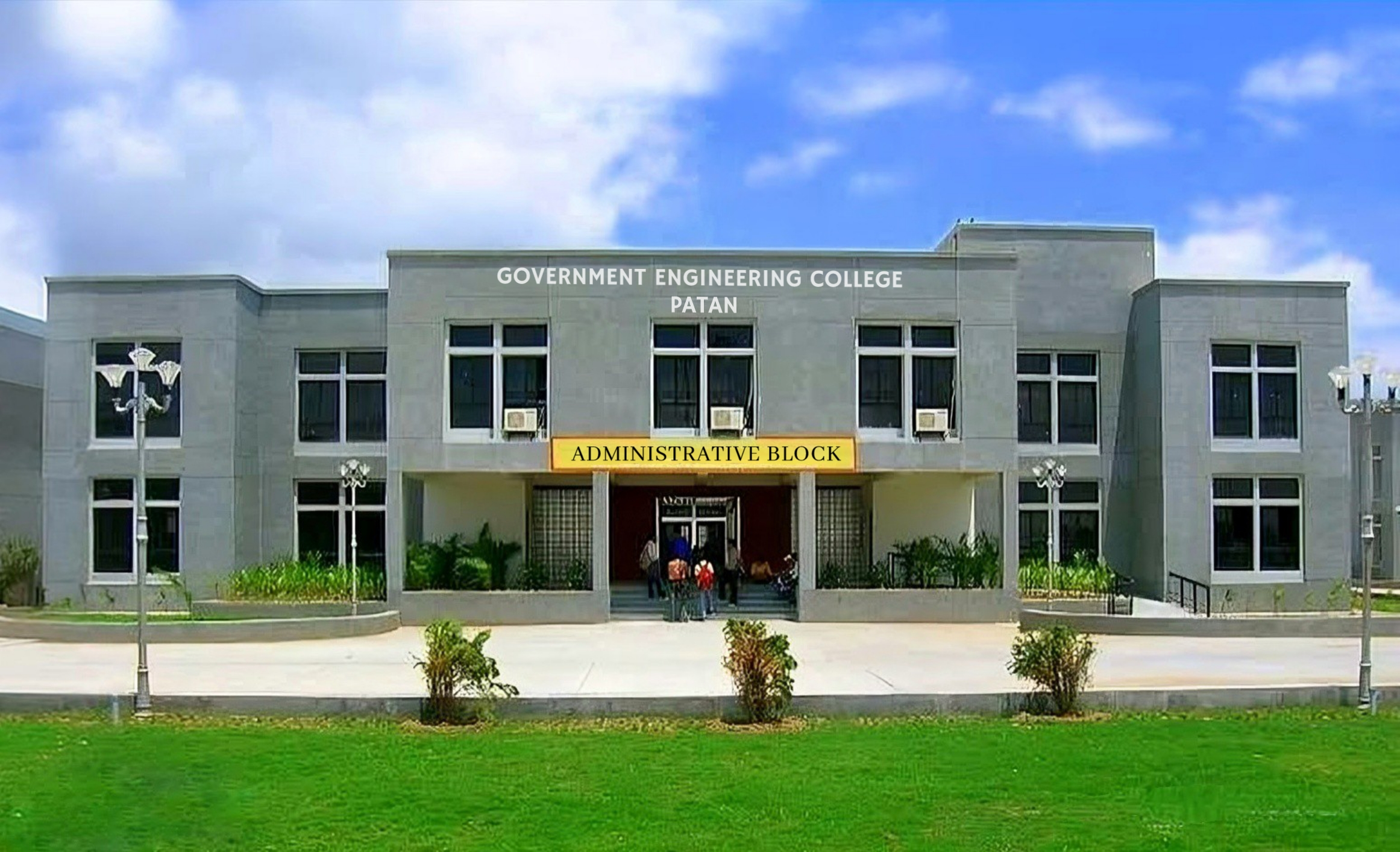
Government Engineering College, Patan

Earlier, Gujarat University was the prime university of Gujarat state heading all colleges, including technical colleges. To ensure more efficient, and systematic imparting of technical education, the state government formulated GTU. GTU declares results all around from February to April for winter exams and all around from June to August of summer exams. Currently 485 colleges are affiliated to this GTU from across Gujarat with over 400,000 students.

== Affiliated colleges ==
Gujarat Technological University Diploma, degree and Master of Engineering courses comprising to Ph.D. doctoral programs and pharmacy courses for bachelors and masters, management courses and MCA.

Notable affiliated engineering colleges include:

- Government Engineering College, Bharuch
- Government Engineering College, Bhavnagar
- Government Engineering College, Bhuj
- Government Engineering College, Dahod
- Government Engineering College, Godhra
- Government Engineering College, Modasa
- Government Engineering College, Palanpur
- Government Engineering College, Rajkot
- Government Engineering College, Valsad
- Government Engineering College, Patan
- Government Engineering College, Gandhinagar
- Government Engineering College, Rajkot
- A. D. Patel Institute of Technology
- Vadodara Institute Of Engineering, Vadodara
- Dalia Institute Of Diploma Studies, Kheda
- B.K. Mody Government Pharmacy College Rajkot
- S.N Patel Institute of Technology & Research Centre
- Babaria Institute of Technology
- KIRC (Kalol Institutes and Research Center) Kalol
- C. K. Pithawala College of Engineering and Technology
- Vidhyadeep Institute of Engineering & Technology
- G. H. Patel College of Engineering and Technology
- G. K. Bharad Institute of Engineering
- Government Polytechnic College Daman
- Government Polytechnic College, Diu
- Grow More Faculty of Diploma Engineering
- Grow More Faculty of Engineering
- Institute of Technology and Management Universe
- K.J. Institute Of Engineering and Technology, Vadodara
- Laljibhai Chaturbhai Institute of Technology, Mehsana [ LCIT ]
- L. J. Institute of Engineering and Technology
- Lalbhai Dalpatbhai College of Engineering
- Lukhdhirji Engineering College
- Sal College of Engineering
- Sal engineering and Technical institute
- Sal Institute Technology and Research
- Sardar Patel College of Engineering, Bakrol
- Sardar Vallabhbhai Patel Institute of Technology
- Sarvajanik College of Engineering and Technology
- Shantilal Shah Engineering College
- Shri S'ad Vidya Mandal Institute of Technology
- Shree K.J Polytechnic, Bharuch
- Silver Oak College of Engineering and Technology
- Vishwakarma Government Engineering College
- Central institute of plastics technology Ahmedabad
- Valia Institutes of Technologies
- Laxminarayan Dev College of Pharmacy, Bharuch
- Narnarayan Shastri institute of technology, Ahmedabad
- Laxmi Institute of Technology, Sarigam

== GTU Innovation Council (GIC) ==
GTU established the 'GTU Innovation Council' at ACPC Building, LD Campus in the year 2013. GTU Innovation Council, also known as GIC, is headed by Hiranmay Mahanta. The aim of the GTU Innovation council is to facilitate student startups by providing necessary facilities, organizing workshops, helping students to find relevant mentors, and other activities weekly. GIC also conducts workshops on Training the professors, Flash Ventures, Social Entrepreneurship Bootcamp, Design Thinking and Ideation workshops.

GTU Innovation Council took the momentum when they launched the Crowdfunding Initiator program in association with Start51, an indigenous crowd-funding platform in India. Crowdfunding Initiator (CFI) is aimed to help student startups with necessary guidance and funding. About 70 student startups from around Gujarat enrolled, out of which only a few projects were selected for the one-month-long Bootcamp. This Bootcamp which was organized from 16 June 2014 to 12 July 2014, was divided into four-part: Ideation, Incentive Model, Pitch Presentation and Funding. By the end of Bootcamp, Crowdfunding Initiator successfully took 8 projects to live on a dedicated crowdfunding portal for funding.

== Rankings ==
The college was ranked 70th in India by the National Institutional Ranking Framework (NIRF) in the pharmacy ranking in 2024.

University rankings

Pharmacy – India
- NIRF (2024): 70
