= Government College of Women =

Government College of Women are public Junior Women's colleges in Pakistan. In 1972, Government of Pakistan nationalized nearly all schools and colleges in Pakistan. The government renamed colleges and many Women's colleges were prefixed with Government College as in Government College of Women and Government Degree Girls College.

The Government College of Women are two-year Junior colleges or Intermediate colleges that are equivalent to Eleventh grade and Twelfth grade High School in United States. These junior colleges award Higher Secondary School Certificate. These colleges concentrate on either Science or Arts educational curriculum. The successful completion of two-year Science curriculum awards F.Sc. certificate. While the successful completion of two-year Arts curriculum awards F.A. certificate. These certificates are equivalent to the High school diploma in USA.

== List of Government College of Women ==
=== Pakhtunkhwa ===
Government women college mansehra

=== Punjab ===
- Government College for Women Dhoke Kala Khan
- Government Degree College Attock
- Viqar un Nisa College for Women, Rawalpindi
- Government College for Women, Lahore
- Government Post Graduate College for Women, Satellite Town, Rawalpindi
- Government College For Women, Bahawalpur
- Government College For Women, Chakwal
- Government College for Women, Jhelum

=== Sindh ===
- Government College for Women F.B. Area, Gulberg Town, Karachi
- Government College for Women Korangi-4, Korangi Town, Karachi
- Government College for Women Korangi–6, Korangi Town, Karachi
- Government College for Women Nazimabad, Liaquatabad Town, Karachi
- Government College for Women New Karachi, New Karachi Town, Karachi
- Government College for Women North Karachi, New Karachi Town, Karachi
- Government College for Women Saudabad, Malir Town, Karachi
- Government College for Women Shahrah-e-Liaquat, Saddar Town, Karachi
- Khatoon-e-Pakistan Government College for Women, Stadium Road, Karachi

== See also ==
- Education in Pakistan
- Intermediate college
- Junior college
- Higher Secondary School Certificate
- Faculty in Science (Certificate) (F.Sc.)
- Faculty in Arts (Certificate) (F.A.)
- Government Degree Girls College
