= GCTS =

GCTS may refer to:

- Gordon–Conwell Theological Seminary, in primarily located in Hamilton, Massachusetts, United States
- Grand Canyon Theological Seminary, a theological graduate school at Grand Canyon University in Phoenix, Arizona, United States
- Tenerife South Airport, in the Canary Islands, Spain
- UN Global Counter-Terrorism Strategy

== See also ==
- GCT (disambiguation)
