= GCET =

GCET can refer to:

- GCET Jammu, an engineering college in Jammu, India
- Gujarat Common Entrance Test: entrance exam conducted for admission to MBA and MCA colleges of Gujarat, India
- G H Patel College Of Engineering & Technology, an engineering college in Vallabh Vidyanagar, India
- GCET Greenfield Community Energy & Technology, an Internet Provider in Greenfield, Massachusetts
