= Jinnah Polytechnic Institute =

Pakistani institution offering tertiary education

Coordinates: 31.3584°N 73.0664°E

- Type: Private
- Affiliations: Technical Education and Vocational Training Authority, Punjab; Punjab Board of Technical Education, Lahore; Government College University, Faisalabad
- Location: Faisalabad, Punjab, Pakistan
- Nickname: JPI
- Website: jpi.edu.pk

The Jinnah Polytechnic Institute (JPI) is a private polytechnic institute located in Faisalabad, Punjab, Pakistan.

== Academics ==
=== Diploma of Associate Engineering (DAE) programs ===
The college offers 3-year Diploma of Associate Engineering (DAE) programs in the following disciplines:

- Civil Technology
- Electrical Technology
- Mechanical Technology
- Electronics Technology
- Architecture Technology
- Instrument Technology

=== Bachelor's programs ===
The college also offers the following bachelor's degree programs:

- BS Electrical Engineering Technology
- BS Mechanical Engineering Technology
- BS Civil Engineering Technology
- BS Computer Science

== See also ==
- Government College of Technology, Faisalabad
