= Government Islamia Graduate College Faisalabad =

College in Pakistan

Government Islamia Graduate College, Faisalabad (GIGCF)
- گورنمنٹ اسلامیہ گریجویٹ کالج سرگودھا روڑ فیصل آباد
- Other names: GIGC
- Motto: رَبِّ زدْنيِ عِلْماً (Arabic)
- Motto in English: O my Lord! Advance me in Knowledge
- Type: Public
- Established: 1954
- Accreditation: BISE Faisalabad
- Academic affiliations: GC University Faisalabad
- Principal: Prof. Ayub Hassan
- Academic staff: c. 50
- Students: c. 2000
- Undergraduates: c. 1000
- Location: Faisalabad, Punjab, Pakistan
- Campus: Urban
- Website: gigcfsd.edu.pk

Government Islamia Graduate College is a government college located in Faisalabad, Punjab, Pakistan.

== History ==
Government Islamia Graduate College was founded by Anjuman Islamia Lyallpur in May 1951 as an intermediate college using the facilities of Muslim High School, Lyallpur. The college was elevated to degree status in 1954 and moved to a new 140-kanal campus on Sargodha Road. The institution was nationalized in 1972, and following the renaming of the city from Lyallpur to Faisalabad in 1977, it adopted its current name.

The college's facilities have expanded over the years. In 1974, a new block was constructed for B.Sc classes, and in 1987, a new library building was opened, which currently holds over thirty-four thousand books. A science block was added in 1998.

Several infrastructure projects have been supported by government grants. For instance, in 2011, funding was allocated for the construction of a commerce block. Later developments included a new science block with classrooms and laboratories, and a multi-purpose auditorium. Additional funding facilitated the construction of an educational block designed to accommodate 600 more students.

In 2013, the Higher Education Commission awarded the college a grade of "X", its second highest rating. The college began offering four-year BS degree programs in subjects including English, Economics, Islamic Studies, Physics, and Zoology starting in the academic year 2014-15. Programs in Business Administration, Chemistry, Computer Science, and Mathematics were initiated in 2015, and a program in Botany began in 2021.

== Academics ==
Islamia College is organized into three divisions, the science, arts and commerce division. These divisions are further categorized as academic departments. The core departments include Commerce, Computer Science, Chemistry, Zoology, Botany, Physics, English, Islamic Studies, Urdu, History, Political Science, Geography, Education, Mathematics, Economics and Statistics.

== Building ==
The college building, established in the 1930s by the Anjuman Islamia Society, holds a significant historical importance as one of the oldest educational institutions in Faisalabad. The building itself is divided into three distinct sections.

The Iqbal block houses the college library and intermediate classes. Additionally, the principal's office and clerical staff have their offices in this block. The Iqbal block serves as the central hub of administrative and academic activities.

The final part of the college building is dedicated to undergraduate and postgraduate classes. This section accommodates both male and female students, facilitating co-education.

Furthermore, the college premises feature two recreational parkst. These parks include a cricket ground and a football ground.

=== Library ===
A library is near Iqbal Hall in "Old Block".

=== Blocks ===
There are three blocks in the college:

- Old Block- which includes Iqbal Hall and class rooms for intermediate
- BS Block- for undergraduate classes which included Science Labs
- Commerce Block- for commerce classes

== Programs ==
College is currently offering educational programs at two levels (Intermediate & Undergraduate).

=== Intermediate ===
- F.A.
- F.Sc. (Pre-Medical)
- F.Sc. (Pre-Engineering)
- I.Com
- I.C.S

=== Undergraduate ===
College provides BS Honors (4-Year) co-education program at undergraduate level. College is affiliated with GC University Faisalabad which has allowed these programs:

- BBA
- BS Zoology
- BS Chemistry
- BS English
- BS Computer Science
- BS Mathematics
- BS Physics
- BS Islamiyat
- BS Economics
- BS Commerce
