= GCT =

GCT may refer to:

== Medicine ==
- Germ cell tumor
- Giant-cell tumor of bone
- Glucose challenge test
- Granulosa cell tumor

== Transport ==
- Gauge Change Train, a Japanese train
- Ghazipur City railway station, in Uttar Pradesh, India
- Grand Canyon Bar 10 Airport, in Arizona, United States
- Grand Central Terminal, in New York City
- Great Coates railway station in England
- Grimsby-Cleethorpes Transport, former municipal bus company of Grimsby and Cleethorpes, England
- Gwinnett County Transit, in Georgia, United States

== Other uses ==
- Galapagos Conservation Trust, a British charity
- Geometric complexity theory
- General consumption tax
- German Colonial Tovar dialect of German, spoken in Venezuela
- Global Champions Tour, a show jumping series
- Gloucester County Times, a daily newspaper in New Jersey
- Government College of Technology (disambiguation)
- Grand Chess Tour, an annual circuit of chess tournaments
- Grande Cadence de Tir (GCT) 155mm, French self-propelled artillery vehicle
- Green Card Test, used by the United States Internal Revenue Service
- Green Crescent Trust, in Sindh, Pakistan
- Greene County Tech School District, in Greene County, Arkansas, United States
- Greenwich Civil Time, an obsolete term for what is now known as Greenwich Mean Time
- Greenwood Community Theatre, in South Carolina, United States
- Gunma Crane Thunders, a Japanese basketball team
- GCT, a codon for the amino acid Alanine
