= Javed Butler =

American cardiologist and researcher

- Born: Karachi, Pakistan
- Education: Aga Khan University; Harvard T.H. Chan School of Public Health; Emory University
- Occupations: Cardiologist; Researcher
- Organization(s): Vanderbilt University; Emory University; Stony Brook University; University of Mississippi Medical Center; American Heart Association; Baylor Scott & White Health
- Known for: Heart failure research, Clinical Research

Javed Butler is an American cardiologist and academic, recognized for his contributions to cardiovascular medicine, particularly in heart failure research. He serves as the Maxwell A. and Gayle H. Clampitt Endowed Chair, president, and chief research executive at Baylor Scott & White Research Institute, and senior vice president at Baylor Scott & White Health in Dallas, Texas. He is a fellow of Heart Failure Society of America, European Society of Cardiology, American College of Cardiology, and American Heart Association.

== Early life and education ==
Born in Karachi, Pakistan, Butler completed his higher secondary education at Adamjee Science College and received his MBBS from Aga Khan University in 1990. He moved to the United States for further medical training, earning a MPH from the Harvard T.H. Chan School of Public Health in 1998 and an MBA from Emory University's Goizueta Business School in 2015.

Butler completed his residency in primary care internal medicine at Yale University, where he also served as Chief Resident. His specialization includes a fellowship in cardiovascular disease and an additional fellowship in Advanced Heart Failure & Transplantation from Vanderbilt University. He pursued additional specialization in cardiac imaging at Massachusetts General Hospital, Harvard University.

== Career ==
Butler began as an instructor of medicine at Yale University (1994–1995) and later served as assistant professor at Vanderbilt University (1999–2006), where he was medical director of both the Heart Transplant and heart-lung transplant programs. In 2007, he joined Emory University as a full professor of medicine and director of the Heart Failure Research Program.

At Stony Brook University, Butler served as Director of Cardiovascular Medicine and co-director of the Heart Institute (2014–2017), where he held the Charles A. Gargano Chair in Cardiology. From 2018 to 2022, he chaired the Department of Medicine at the University of Mississippi Medical Center, where he was also a professor of Physiology and Biophysics and held the Patrick H. Lehan Chair in Cardiovascular Research.

Butler has combined clinical work with research, education, and leadership, directing heart failure and transplant programs at Vanderbilt and Tennessee Valley Healthcare systems. He served as Deputy Chief Science Officer for the American Heart Association (AHA) from 2009 to 2016.

He has chaired committees for the Heart Failure Society of America and the American College of Cardiology, and represented the U.S. on the European Society of Cardiology Heart Failure Guidelines panel. Butler is a Fellow of the AHA, ACC, HFSA, and ESC.

Butler chairs the U.S. Food and Drug Administration's Cardio-Renal Advisory Committee, co-chairs the NIH-funded HeartShare study on heart failure progression, and serves as principal investigator for several international cardiovascular trials. He is ranked as one of the top cardiovascular experts globally.

== Research ==
Butler is a heart failure expert, with research spanning prevention to advanced therapies, including cardiac transplantation and ventricular assist devices. He has published more than 1,500 peer-reviewed publications. He has led or participated in over 100 clinical trials, developed the Atlanta Cardiomyopathy Consortium, and helped establish the NIH-funded Heart Failure Network at Emory University.

Butler is a senior consulting editor for the Journal of the American College of Cardiology associate editor for the European Heart Journal section editor for the Journal of the American College of Cardiology: Heart Failure guest editor for the European Journal of Heart Failure, and serves on the editorial board of Circulation. He has also peer-reviewed for journals, including the New England Journal of Medicine, Journal of the American Medical Association (JAMA), and Lancet.

== Selected publications ==
- Butler, J et al. "Empagliflozin after Acute Myocardial Infarction." N Engl J Med 2024.
- Anker SD, Butler J et al. "Empagliflozin in Heart Failure with a Preserved Ejection Fraction." N Engl J Med 2021.
- Packer M, Butler J et al. "Empagliflozin and Major Renal Outcomes in Heart Failure." N Engl J Med 2021.
- Butler J et al. "Semaglutide versus placebo in people with obesity-related heart failure with preserved ejection fraction: a pooled analysis of the STEP-HFpEF and STEP-HFpEF DM randomised trials." Lancet 2024.
- Armstrong PW, Butler J et al. "Effect of Vericiguat vs Placebo on Quality of Life in Patients with Heart Failure and Preserved Ejection Fraction: The VITALITY-HFpEF Randomized Clinical Trial." JAMA 2020.
- Butler J et al. "Redefining Heart Failure with a Reduced Ejection Fraction." JAMA 2019.
