= Government College of Technology =

Government College of Technology may refer to:

== India ==
- Government College of Technology, Coimbatore

== Pakistan ==
- Government College of Technology, Bahawalpur
- Government College of Technology, Faisalabad
- Government College of Technology, Multan
- Government College of Technology, Rasul, now University of Rasul

== See also ==
- Institute of technology
