= Shantilal Shah Engineering College =

Coordinates: 21.7046°N 72.1224°E

- Type: Public
- Established: 3 April 1983; 42 years ago
- Accreditation: AICTE; Government of Gujarat
- Chancellor: Dr. Kamla Benival
- Vice-Chancellor: Dr. D.R.Korat
- Principal: Dr. G. P. Vadodaria
- Students: 1,200
- Address: New Sidsar Campus, Bhavnagar, Gujarat, India
- Affiliations: GTU
- Website: www.ssgec.ac.in

Shantilal Shah Engineering College is approved by and affiliated to the Gujarat Technological University (GTU). It is accredited by All India Council for Technical Education and Government of Gujarat. The institute started functioning from the academic year 1983–84.

== Academics ==
Research activities are carried out in the areas of Technology.

== Departments ==
- Applied Mechanics Engineering
- Civil Engineering
- Electrical Engineering
- Electronics And Communication
- Instrumentation And Controls
- Information Technology
- Mechanical Engineering
- Production Engineering
