= Mohan S. Gundeti =

Indian-American surgeon and professor

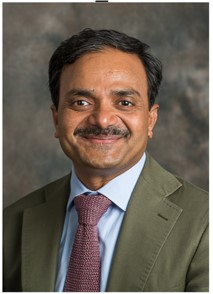
- Education: Dr. V. M. Government Medical College
- Awards: Hans Marberger Award 2016 European Association of Urology
- Scientific career
- Fields: Pediatric urology Robotic surgery
- Thesis: Postoperative management without antibiotics ( 1995)
- Website: www.uchicagomedicine.org/find-a-physician/physician/mohan-s-gundeti

Dr. Mohan S. Gundeti is an Indian pediatric urological surgeon and professor of surgery. Gundeti has served as the chief of pediatric urology at the University of Chicago Comer Children’s Hospital in Chicago, Illinois, since 2007.

Prior to his appointment at The University of Chicago, Gundeti was a locum consultant in pediatric urological surgery at the Great Ormond Street Hospital for Children and Guy’s and St. Thomas’ Hospital in London, where he worked and trained from 1999 to 2005.

At The University of Chicago, in 2008, Gundeti (as team leader) performed the world’s first robot-assisted bladder reconstructive surgery. for a pediatric patient.

Gundeti has co-authored and edited several textbooks and publications, including the “Robotic Urological Surgery” Textbook published in 2022.

== Gundeti surgical techniques ==
Gundeti has developed multiple robotic surgical techniques for pediatric urology. The first is The University of Chicago RALIMA (Robot Assisted Laparoscopic Bladder Augmentation Ileocystoplasty with Mitrofanoff Appendicovesicostomy) Technique.

In 2011, Gundeti began developing the LUAA "Gundeti" Technique for surgical correction of vesicoureteral reflux.

Gundeti’s research in clinical outcomes of complex urological surgery have been recognized by the American Urological Association (AUA) and European Society of Pediatric Urology (ESPU). He is now researching applications of Machine Learning to aid in diagnosing kidney diseases through funding from the Chicago Institute for Translational Medicine (ITM) Pilot Awards Program along with Maryellen Giger.

== Books published and edited ==
Gundeti is the author and editor of the educational textbooks “Blackwell Wiley Pediatric Robotic and Reconstructive Urology: A Comprehensive Guide” published in 2012, and “Surgical Techniques in Pediatric and Adolescent Urology", published in 2020. Gundeti was also the co-editor and co-author of the "Robotic Urological Surgery" textbook which was published in 2022.

He co-edited and authored an online textbook, the "Pediatric Urology Book" in order to reduce restrictions to access, which was published in 2023. In addition to these major publications, Gundeti has co-authored over 200 publications, including book chapters, peer-reviewed journal articles, and review articles.

Between the years of 2013 and 2021, Gundeti was the consulting editor of the British Journal of Urology International (BJUI), and is presently an associate editor of the Urology Video Journal and JU Open Plus.

== Awards and honors ==
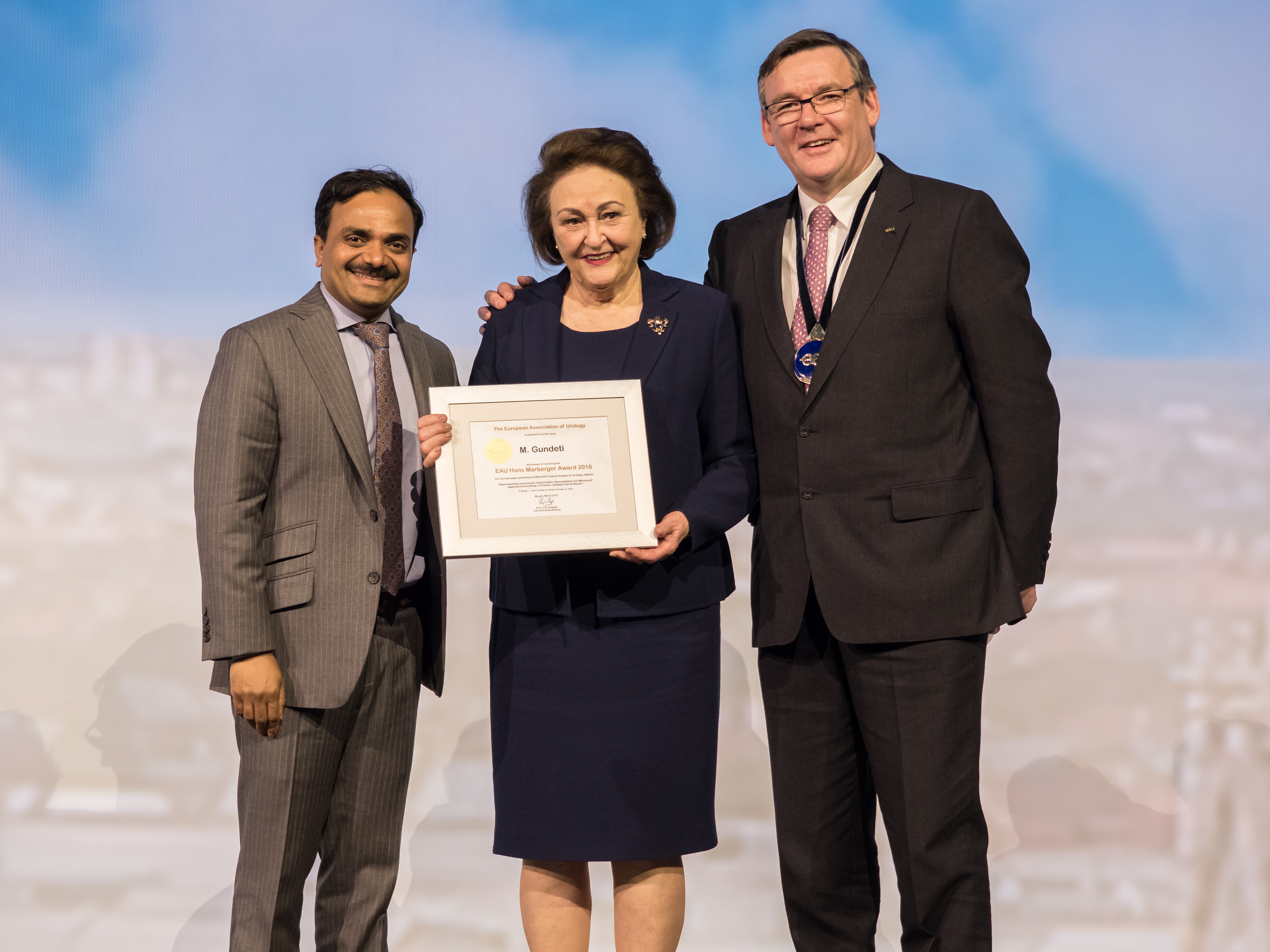
EAU Munchen Award

2012: Third Prize Basis Research Award for Clinical Research study entitled “Is Pelvic Plexus Nerve Identification possible during the Robotic Assisted Laparoscopic Ureteric Reimplantation (RALUR)” awarded by the European Society of Pediatric Urology (ESPU).

2014: Recognized as one of America’s Top Doctors and Best Doctor in Chicago by Castle Connolly

2016: Hans Marberger Award awarded by the European Association of Urology (EAU).
