= Vishwakarma Government Engineering College =

- Other name: VGEC
- Established: August 1, 1994; 32 years ago
- Affiliations: NBA; AICTE
- Academic affiliations: Gujarat Technological University
- Principal: Dr. V. S. Purani
- Location: Nr. Visat three roads, Sabarmati-Koba highway, Chandkheda., Ahmedabad, Gujarat, 382424, India; 23.10551°N 72.5965°E
- Website: https://www.vgecg.ac.in/
- Location and map of VGEC, Chandkheda, Gujarati, India.

Vishwakarma Government Engineering College (VGEC) is located in Chandkheda, Ahmedabad, Gujarat, India. Established in August 1994, it is affiliated with Gujarat Technological University(GTU) offering Engineering courses in 14 undergraduate and 5 postgraduate programs.

== Location ==
The college is located on the Koba-Visat highway between Ahmedabad and Gandhinagar. MTS and BRTS services connect college to parts of Ahmedabad. Direct buses to the college are available from several locations. Kalupur Central Railway Station, Sabarmati Railway Station, and Maninagar Railway Station are connected to the college via AMTS and BRTS. The Sardar Vallabhbhai Patel International Airport is 12 km from the college.

== Academics ==
Undergraduate programs
- 1. Applied Mechanics
- 2. Chemical Engineering
- 3. Civil Engineering
- 4. Computer Engineering
- 5. Computer Science And Engineering (Data Science)
- 6. Electronics And Communication
- 7. Electronics And Instrumentation Engineering
- 8. Electrical Engineering
- 9. Information Technology
- 10. Information Communication And Technology
- 11. Instrumentation And Control
- 12. Mechanical Engineering
- 13. Power Electronics
- 14. Science And Humanities
Postgraduate programs
- 1. Chemical Engineering
- 2. Civil Engineering
- 3. Electronics And Communication Engineering
- 4. Information Technology
- 5. Power Electronics

== Campus ==
Learning, lab exercises, research, seminars and other activities takes place in "blocks". The campus has a radial design. Blocks A, C, F, I and L serve as entry points. The blocks present inside the circle form a connected graph-like structure, making it easy to maneuver blocks. Blocks N, M, W (workshop) and the library, boys hostel, girls hostel basketball court and football ground lie outside the circular campus. Gujarat Technological University is connected to the campus and can be accessed via the south-west entrance near E and D blocks.
