= Pingle Government Degree College for Women =

Pingle Government Degree College for Women (Autonomous)
- Type: Government degree colleges in India
- Established: 1965
- Affiliations: Kakatiya University
- Location: Waddepally, Hanamkonda, Telangana, India; 18.000476°N 79.530299°E
- Campus: Urban
- Website: gdcts.cgg.gov.in/hanamkondawomen.edu

Pingle Government Degree College for Women (Autonomous) is a degree college for women, located in Waddepally, Hanamkonda. The college offers Undergraduate and Postgraduate courses.

== History ==
On 16-08-1965, Sri Pingle Venkatrama Reddy (The Dy. Prime Minister in Nizam Dynasty) and his two brothers Sri Pingle Krishna Reddy and Sri Pingle Ranga Reddy donated the building and land to the government for establishing an institution of higher learning. College was started with pre-university course (Intermediate) in the faculties of Arts, Commerce and Science in both English and Telugu medium. In 1966-67 degree courses were introduced in the college in both English and Telugu media with affiliation to Osmania University, Hyderabad. The college affiliation was transferred to Kakatiya University in 1978.

== Campus ==
The college is located in Waddepally, Hanamkonda close to 100 ft. road by Waddepally Lake. College has a good provision for sports, and cultural activities. It also has extension activities like NCC and NSS.

== Academics ==
Undergraduate courses include:

- Science – B.Sc. (Mathematics, Physics, Chemistry, Botany, Zoology, Computer Science, Microbiology, Bio-Technology)
- Arts – B.A. (History, Economics, Political Science, Modern Language, Public Administration)
- Commerce – B.Com (General, Computer Applications)

Postgraduate courses include:

- Science – M.Sc. (Botany, Zoology, Microbiology)
- Arts – M.A. (Telugu, English, History)
- Commerce – M.Com

== Notable alumni ==
- Konda Surekha, politician
