= Government College for Women =

Government College for Women may refer to:

India

- Government College for Women, Anantnag
- Government College for Women, Baramulla
- Government College for Women, Nawakadal Srinagar
- Government Degree College for Women, Sopore

Pakistan

- Government College for Women Dhoke Kala Khan
