= Government College University =

Government College University may refer to:

- Government College University, Faisalabad
- Government College University, Hyderabad
- Government College University, Lahore

== See also ==
- Government College (disambiguation)
