= Government Engineering College, Bhuj =

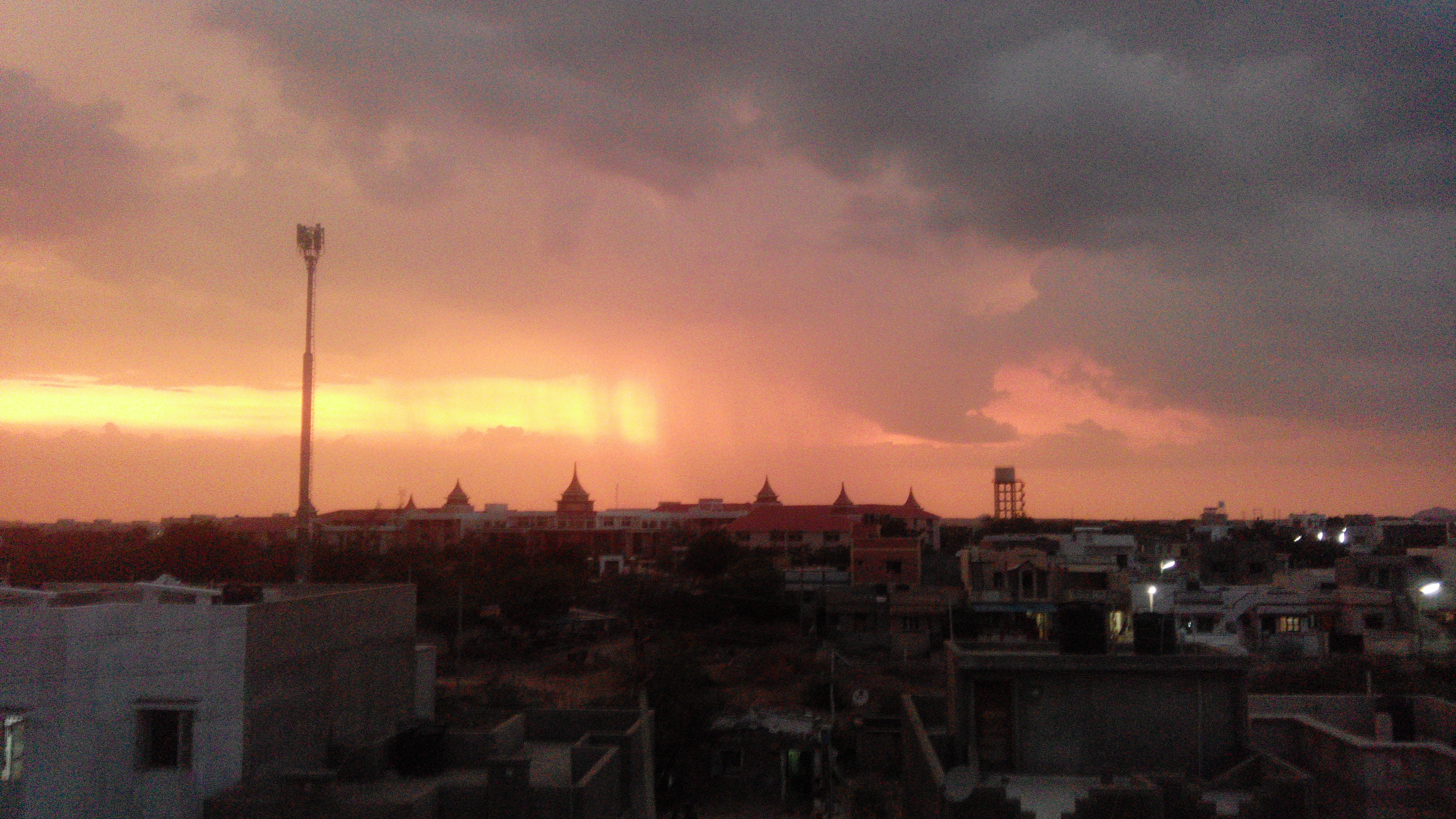
GEC-Bhuj

The Government Engineering College, Bhuj (GECB) is an AICTE-accredited engineering College in Bhuj, Gujarat, India. It is affiliated with Gujarat Technological University.

== Degrees ==
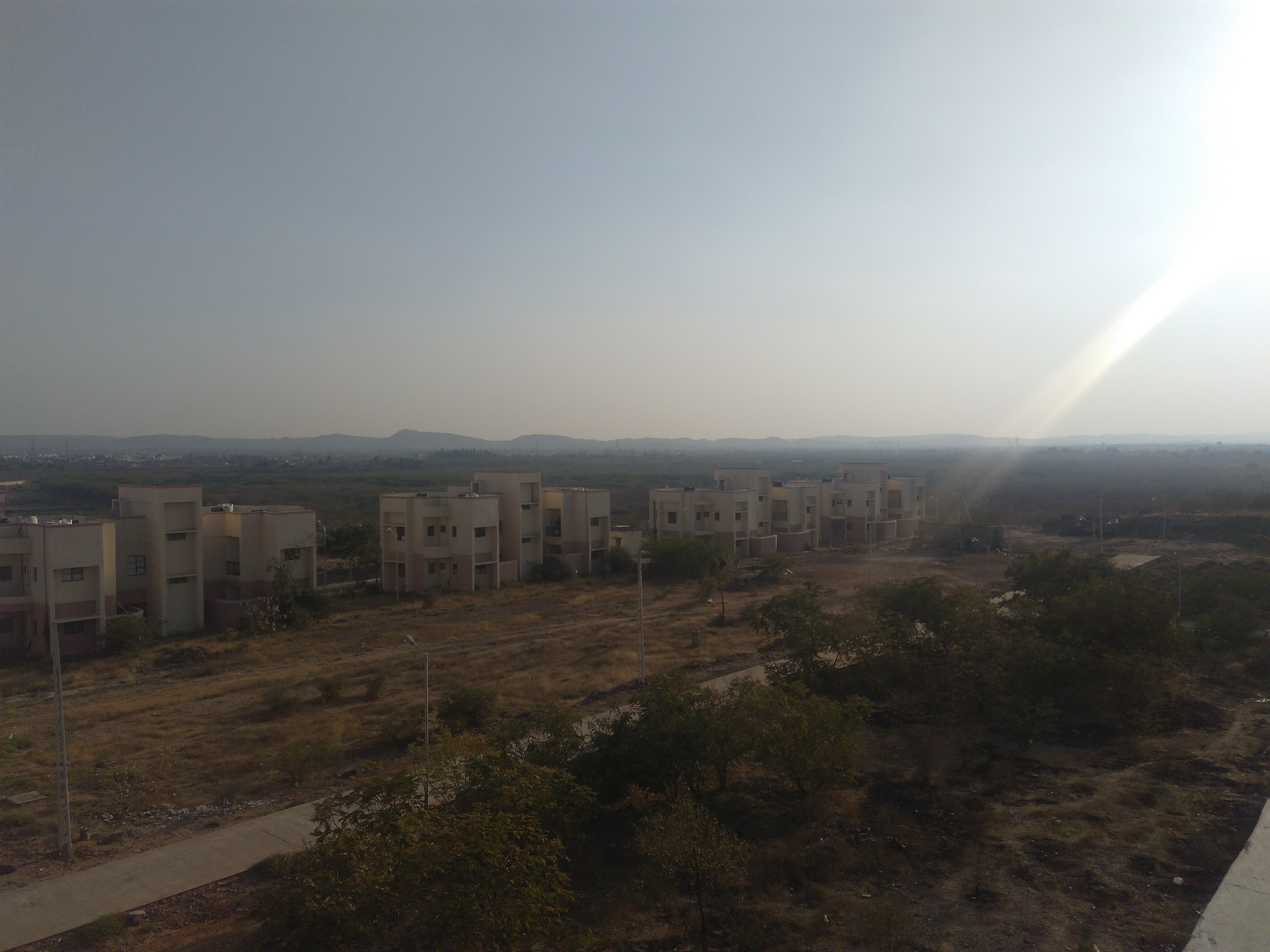
From Boys hostel overlooking Protected Forest.

The college was established on 26 September 1994, initially with two branches: Mechanical Engineering and Electrical Engineering. It was initially affiliated to Gujarat University, Ahmedabad. The college building was initially located in Polytechnic campus of Bhuj. In 2001 after major earth quake struck Bhuj, entire college and hostel building was damaged beyond repair, so the college students (399 in total) were shifted to L D College of Engineering, Ahmedabad. in 2003 students were shifted back to New Building ( Present Building).

Presently the College is approved by AICTE and affiliated with Gujarat Technological University, Ahmedabad. The college is administered by the Directorate of Technical Education, Gujarat State, Gandhinagar, and the admission process carried out through centralized admission process of ACPC and as per the Government of Gujarat norms. The College offers undergraduate degrees in Mechanical Engineering, Electrical Engineering, Civil Engineering, Electronics and Communication Engineering, Mining Engineering, Chemical Engineering(NBA Accredited), and Environment engineering. The college has two postgraduate programs: Mechanical Engineering (automotive) and Mechanical Engineering (power systems).

There are four hostel (3 for Boys and 1 for Girls).

== Hostels ==
Hostel rooms are allotted every year after admission process is over via internal merit-list prepared by college. It is usually very hard to get a room due to limited number of rooms and competition. There are four hostels, 3 for boys and 1 for girls at present and the number might grow in the future.

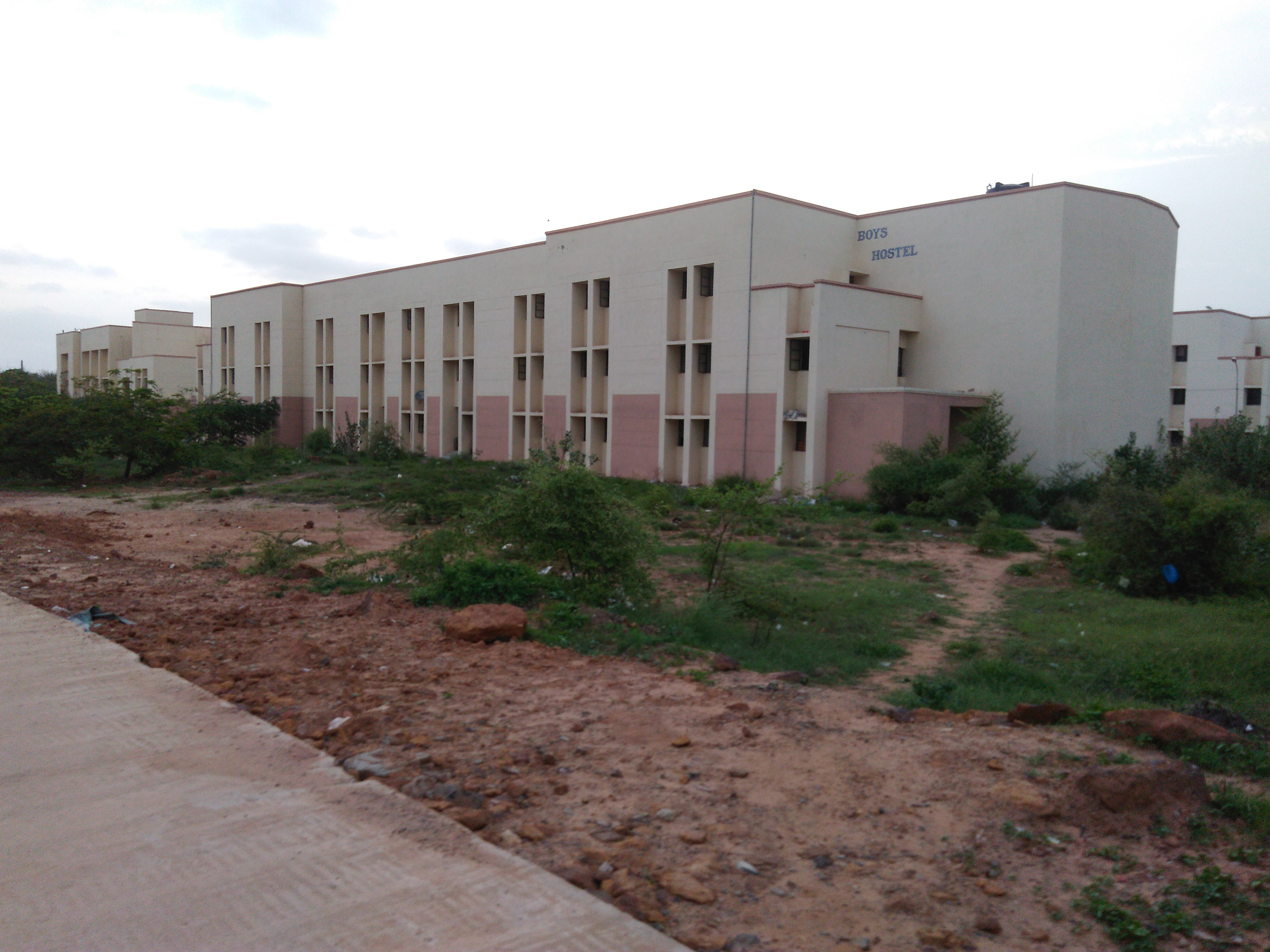
Hostel-1,2,3

== History ==
GECB was established in 1994. Following the 2001 Gujarat earthquake, the 399 students in the engineering courses were shifted to Ahmedabad where they attended classes at the Lalbhai Dalpatbhai College of Engineering while GECB was being reconstructed.
