= Government Engineering College, Bhavnagar =

College in Gujarat, India

Coordinates: 21.7589°N 72.1323°E

- Motto: तेजस्विना वधितमस्तु
- Motto in English: Tejaswina Vadhitamastu (Sanskrit) [Meaning: Let our efforts and learning be luminous and filled with joy and endowed with the force of purpose]
- Type: Government
- Established: 2004
- Academic affiliations: Gujarat Technological University, Ahmedabad
- Principal: Mangal Bhatt
- Undergraduates: 540
- Postgraduates: 5
- Location: Bhavnagar, Gujarat, India
- Campus: Besides BPTI Campus, Vidyanagar
- Website: gecbhavnagar.ac.in

Government Engineering College Bhavnagar is a state-governed educational institution of Bhavnagar, Gujarat, India. Recognized by the All India Council of Technical Education (AICTE), it offers multi-discipline undergraduate programmes in engineering. The institute also offers a postgraduate program (M.E.) in Electronics and Communication Engineering , which was introduced in 2023. The institute was affiliated to Bhavnagar University until April 2008, when it became affiliated to the Gujarat Technological University (GTU), Ahmedabad.

== History ==
The institute was established in the year 2004 with intake capacity of 120 students in the discipline of Electronics & Communication and Production Engineering, subsequently the intake was increased to 300 students in the year 2008 with Electronics & Communication (120) seats and Production Engineering (120) seats and introduction of Mechanical Engineering (60) seats. In 2009 and onwards total intake of the institute reaches to 540 students with introduction of Computer Engineering (60), Information & Technology (60) and Civil Engineering (60) as new discipline with increase in intake in Mechanical Engineering to 60 more seats

== Infrastructure ==
The current campus of the institute was inaugurated by the Chief Minister of Gujarat Narendra Modi on 18 February 2009. It is located in Bhavnagar, 1.5 km (0.93 mi) away from the State transport Depot and 2.5 km (1.6 mi) away from Bhavnagar Railway Station.

The institute is spread over 43,400 m^{2} (467,000 sq ft) of land area with 14,300 m^{2} (154,000 sq ft) of land. It has separate blocks for Electronics and Communication Department, Mechanical and Production Department, Library Building, Amenity Building, Works Shop and Administrative Building. The library has more than 6000 books, with a book bank facility for the needy students.

== Courses ==
As of 2011, the institute has 540 seats in engineering:

- Civil Engineering 60
- Mechanical Engineering 120
- Production Engineering 120
- Electronics & Communication Engineering 120
- Information Technology 60
- Computer Engineering 60

== Hostel facilities ==
Recently this college provide separate hostels for boys and girls in which up to 99 and 444accommodations are available at present.
