= Government College Muzaffargarh =

ضِلع مُظفّرگڑھ
- District
- Muzaffargarh District
- Map of Punjab with Muzaffargarh District highlighted

The Government College Muzaffargarh is located on Multan road at a distance of 2 km from the city center. Muzaffargarh is affiliated with the Bahauddin Zakariya University, Multan. The current principal is Prof. Khaleel-ur-Rehman Farooqi.

== History ==
The Institution is one of the oldest seats of learning in southern Punjab. The College started functioning in 1954 as a higher secondary school. The foundation of the college was laid by Sardar Abdul Hamid Khan Dastii in 1953. In 1959 the institution was given the name of Government Degree College Muzaffargarh and Degree classes were started. The main objective of the College is to provide facilities of Higher education to the population of the Muzaffargarh District and neighboring areas. The college is affiliated with Bahauddin Zakariya University, Multan.

== Centre in Computer Excellence ==
Centre in Computer Excellence, GC Muzaffargarh, since its establishment on September 26, 2000 has been working as Computer Training Centre in collaboration between Education Department, Punjab and Punjab Information Technology Board, Lahore Under ICS/ACS Project. The College offer various short and long computer courses under the supervision of Prof. durr-e-Subhani Hashmi like;

- Post Graduate Diploma in Software PGD (1 year)
- Diploma in Information Technology DIT (1 year)
- Diploma in Computer Application DCA (6 months)
- Diploma in Office Management DOM (3 months)<

== Postgraduate classes ==
In 2003, the Punjab government upgraded the college, and postgraduate classes were started in 2004. Currently postgraduate education is provided in four subjects English, Urdu, Maths and Economics.
