= Guild for Exceptional Children =

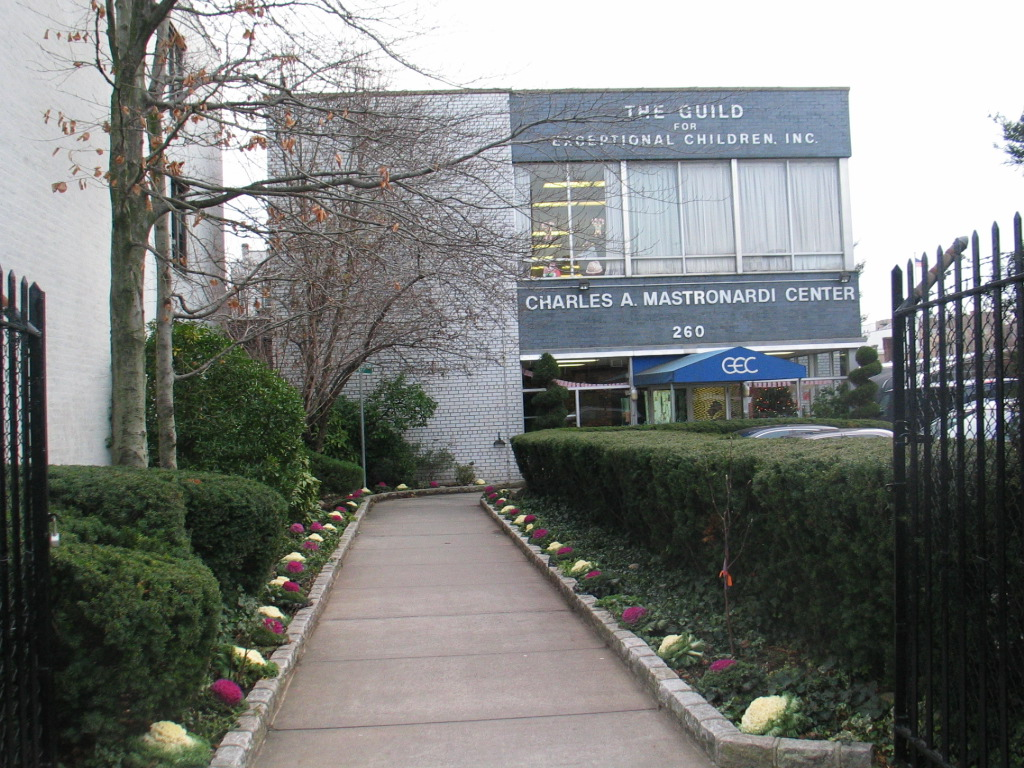
The Guild for Exceptional Children

The Guild for Exceptional Children is a nonprofit organization in Brooklyn which offers schooling and other services for children and adults with a disability. It identifies itself as a provider of direct and indirect services for developmentally delayed or disabled persons, from infancy through old age, and their families.

The organization was founded by families that needed extra support for their children with special needs, but it now also provides services for adults and the elderly. People attending Guild programs may become members of a self-advocacy group where they discuss their rights and recommend changes within the agency.

== Services ==
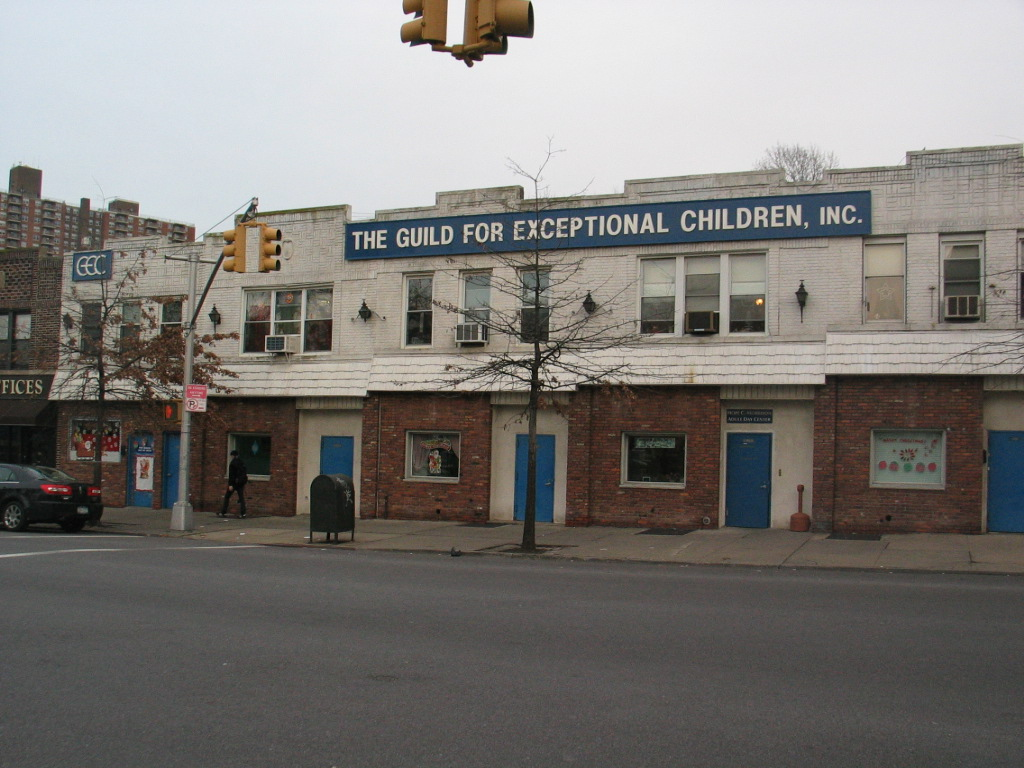
The offices are housed here

- The Louis Boehm Diagnostic and Counseling Clinic provides screenings, evaluations, referrals and therapeutic services, for persons who are developmentally delayed or disabled, as well as their families. It was established in 1966, and now is a fully certified, accredited and licensed Article 16 Clinic. The Boehm Clinic is the first point of contact for families interested in GEC's adult programs.
- The Carrie Mastronardi Early Childhood Education Center serves children from birth to age four, and their families.
- The Day Habilitation Workshop Program provides adults with moderate and mild mental retardation with community-based activities, such as penmaking, and labeling.
- The Hope C. Morrison Day Center provides both day treatment and day habilitation.
- Pre-Vocational "Day-Hab Without Walls" provides training and work experience for developmentally disabled adults in various worksites such as hospitals, retail stores, nursing homes, and at one point Fort Hamilton.
- The Peter J. Mulligan Day Habilitation Program provides habilitation and job training services for individuals that are moderately to severely developmentally disabled. Various activities include work sites, computer classes, culinary classes, and exercise classes.
- The Early Intervention program offers service coordination, evaluation and therapeutic services for special instruction, speech and language therapy, occupational therapy, feeding therapy, psychology, physical therapy, audiology and social work.
- The Residential Services department offers several residential facilities in southwest Brooklyn with services varying according to individual needs.
- Horticulture/Greenhouse: Day Hab participants help to grow herbs in a greenhouse and other horticultural facilities throughout Brooklyn. This greenhouse is open for public to purchase plants. GEC participants also participate in Brooklyn Botanic Garden Horticultural programs. This makes a Guild for Exceptional Children, a member of the American Horticultural Therapy Association.
- The Waiver Services group helps families get access to services that they might not otherwise be able to participate in.

Other specialized services include Medicaid service coordination, social rehabilitation, an adult daycare center for seniors, family Support and in-home respite care.

== History ==
The Guild for Exceptional Children was founded in 1958, at a time when many public schools did not provide classes for some children with a disability. The founding president of the Guild for Exceptional Children was Olga DeFelippo (died November 3, 2005). In 2001, the City of New York renamed part of 68th Street in Brooklyn, between Ridge Boulevard and 3rd Avenue, as "Guild For Exceptional Children Way."

Like many other agencies that serve those with developmental disabilities, the Guild is currently operating at a time of budget cuts from the state and working to adapt to serve a population that is for the first time consistently living past middle age. Old age has brought a range of additional challenges to the agency, from compounded psychiatric issues to decreasing mobility amongst residents and day program attendees.
