= Greater Egyptian Conference =

- Conference: IHSA
- Founded: 1948-49
- Sports fielded: 5 (boys: 2; girls: 3)
- No. of teams: 8
- Region: Southern Illinois

The Greater Egyptian Conference is a high school athletic conference represented by 8 schools in the south-eastern portion of Illinois, US. It is a member of the Illinois High School Association.

The conference offers championships for girls in basketball, softball, and volleyball. In boys' sports, the GEC offers championships in baseball and basketball.

Locations of Greater Egyptian Schools

== Current members ==
School	Location (Population)	Nickname	Colors	Enrollment (2021-2022)	Years Member	Additional Information
Carrier Mills-Stonefort High School	Carrier Mills, Illinois (1,655)	Wildcats	Purple; Gold	127	??-Present	
Crab Orchard High School	Crab Orchard, Illinois (333)	Trojans	Orange; Black	140	1983–Present	
Galatia High School	Galatia, Illinois (801)	Bearcats	Red; White	116	1948–Present	
Gallatin County High School	Junction, Illinois (129)	Hawks	Navy Orange White	202	1987–Present	
Hardin County High School	Elizabethtown, Illinois (299)	Cougars	Blue; Red	167	1980–Present	
Norris City-Omaha-Enfield High School	Norris City, Illinois (1,275)	Fighting Cardinals	Red; White	201	??-1983, 2007–Present	
Pope County High School	Golconda, Illinois (688)	Pirates	Maroon; White	146	??-Present	
Thompsonville Community High School	Thompsonville, Illinois (543)	Tigers	Blue; White	106	?-1983, 2007–Present	

== Former Members ==
School	Location (Population)	Nickname	Colors	Years Member	Additional Information
Cave-In-Rock High School	Cave-In-Rock, Illinois	Eagles	Red; White Blue	??-1980	Consolidated to Hardin County in 1980
Rosiclare High School	Rosiclare, Illinois	Bears	Navy; Orange White	1948 -1977	Consolidated to Hardin County
Shawneetown High School	Shawneetown, Illinois	Indians	Orange; Black	??-1987	Consolidated to Gallatin County
Ridgway High School	Ridgway, Illinois	Eagles	Blue; Gold	??-1987	Consolidated to Gallatin County
Equality High School	Equality, Illinois	Cardinals	Red; White	??-1987	Consolidated to Norris City-Omaha-Enfield
Norris City High School	Norris City, Illinois	Cardinals	Red; White	??-??	Consolidated to Norris City-Omaha-Enfield
Marion High School	Marion, Illinois (17,193)	Wildcats	Navy Gold	??-1939	Joined the South Seven Conference in 1939
