= Adamjee Government Science College =

Educational institution in Karachi, Pakistan

Adamjee Govt. Science College
- دانش کدہَ آدم جی برائے سائنس
- Type: Public
- Established: 1961
- Affiliations: Board of Intermediate Education Karachi; University of Karachi
- Principal: Naeem Khalid
- Students: 1,500+
- Undergraduates: 250
- Location: Karachi, Sindh, Pakistan

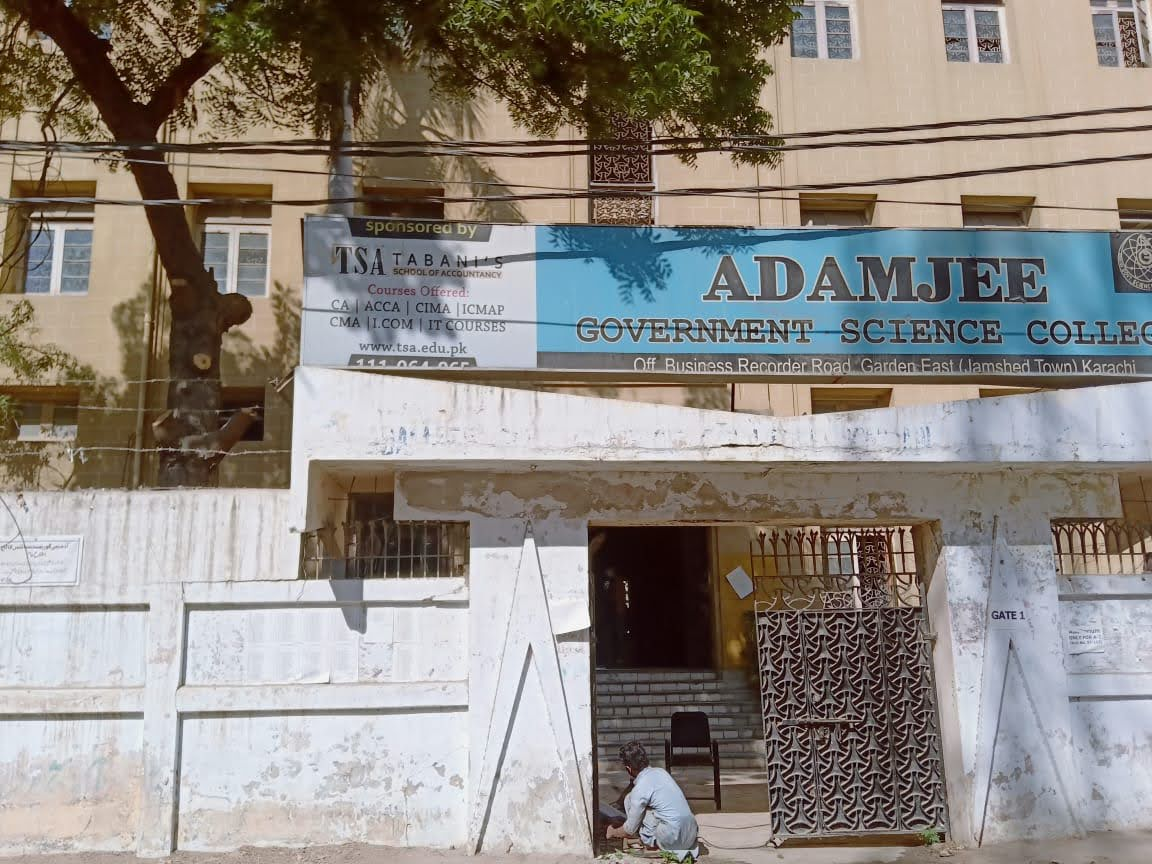
Adamjee Government Science College, Karachi

Adamjee Government Science College (AGSC) (Urdu: دانش کدہَ آدم جی برائے سائنس) is a public intermediate and degree college located in the Garden East area of Jamshed Town in Karachi, Sindh, Pakistan. It offers programs at the intermediate and bachelor's degree levels in the sciences and is affiliated with the Board of Intermediate Education Karachi and the University of Karachi.

== History ==
Adamjee Government Science College was established in 1961 by the All Pakistan Memon Educational and Welfare Society, with financial assistance from Sir Adamjee Haji Dawood and Abdul Ghani Dada Bhai Junani. The college was inaugurated on 30 July 1961 by the then President of Pakistan, Field Marshal Ayub Khan. It commenced operations with 100 students enrolled in class XI, adding a new class each subsequent year. By 1965, it had developed into a full-fledged degree science college, with more than 200 students at the intermediate level and 45 students at the degree level.

In 1972, the college was nationalised, as part of a wider nationalization of educational institutions undertaken by the government of Prime Minister Zulfikar Ali Bhutto. At the time of nationalisation, the college had 400 intermediate and 100 degree students.

For several decades, Adamjee was widely regarded as one of the leading government colleges in Karachi, regularly producing top performers in the city's Higher Secondary School Certificate examinations. Students from the college secured all three top positions in pre-engineering in 2011, the first position in pre-medical in 2017, and the second and third positions in pre-engineering as well as the third position in computer science in 2018.

== Campus ==
The college is located on Shahani Street, off Business Recorder Road in the Garden East neighbourhood of Jamshed Town, near the Gurumandir Roundabout and within a short distance of Mazar-e-Quaid, the mausoleum of Muhammad Ali Jinnah. The campus hosts intermediate and degree-level science teaching departments, including mathematics, physics, chemistry and statistics.

== Principals ==
1. A.L. Shaikh (30 April 1961 to 31 August 1972).
2. Mastoor M.Tahir (1 September 1972 to 6 December 1986).
3. Muhammad Amanullah ( 7 December 1986 to 8 October 1991).
4. S.Iftikhar Ahmed (9 October 1991 to 10 March 1993).
5. M. Faheemuddin (11 March 1993 to 11 February 1998).
6. Muhammad Saeed Siddiqui (12 February 1998 to 15 October 1999).
7. M.Sharif Memon (1 October 1999 to 2 December 1999).
8. M.Saeed Siddiqui (3 December 1999 to 31 December 1999).
9. Mumtaz Ali Abbasi (1 January 2000 to 22 March 2000).
10. M.Jawaid Siddiqui (23 March 2000 to 18 September 2002).
11. Syed Sadruddin Hussain (19 March 2002 to 18 March 2003).
12. Salahuddin Jamali (19 March 2003 to 6 April 2004).
13. S.Sadruddin Hussain (7 April 2004 to 25 April 2005).
14. Kafeel Alam Siddiqui (26 April 2005 to 31 October 2005).
15. Rafiq Ahmed Siddiqui (1 November 2005 to 24 April 2007).
16. Nasir Ansar (25 April 2007 to 15 March 2010).
17. Tariq Habib (16 March 2010 to 9 March 2011).
18. Zafar Saeed Shaikh (10 March 2011 to 15 April 2011).
19. A.B.Awan (15 April 2011 to 2013)
20. Naseem Haider (10 August 2014 to 1 June 2017)
21. Moazzam Haider (8 August 2017 – 2019)
22. Mohsin Sheikh (2019–2021)
23. Mushtaq Ahmed Maher (2021–2022)
24. Hafiz Abdul Bari Indhar (2022–2023)
25. Rumina Akhtar (late) (2023–2024)
26. Nasir Iqbal (2024–25)
27. Mustufa Kamal (2025)
28. Nasir Iqbal (2025–2026)
29. Naeem Khalid (2026-present)

== Notable alumni ==
- Javed Butler, American cardiologist

== See also ==
- Adamjee Group
