= Government College of Technology, Multan =

College in Punjab, Pakistan

Government College of Technology
- Other name: GCT Multan
- Established: 1965
- Location: Multan, Punjab, Pakistan
- Website: gctmultan.edu.pk

Government College of Technology (or GCT), Multan, Punjab, Pakistan was formerly known as Government Polytechnic Institute. The institute was established in 1965 and upgraded to Government College of Technology in 1981–1982. GCT is covered 24 hectares (60 acres) area. It is located in Qasim Pur Colony, Bahawalpur road, Multan. Due to the road broadness, its main gate has been shifted to backside and the name of college written for years on it now has been disappeared.

This college offers three-year diploma of associate engineers courses in:

- Electrical technology
- Mechanical technology
- Civil technology
- Chemical technology
- Electronics technology
- Textile technology (dyeing and weaving)
