= Narayanganj Government Mohila College =

Women's college in Bangladesh

- Established: 1962
- Location: Narayanganj, Bangladesh; 23.6232°N 90.4982°E
- Campus: Urban, H.S.C, Honors
- Website: www.ngmc.gov.bd

Narayanganj Government Mohila College (Bengali: নারায়ণগঞ্জ সরকারি মহিলা কলেজ) is a women's college in Narayanganj, Bangladesh. It is one of the major educational institutions for women's education in the district.

== History ==
The college was established in 1962. Owing to infrastructure issues, the college was relocated to the Municipal Public Library Building in 1963. Later a new campus and academic building were built on donated land by Government Tolaram College in 1965.

Former president Hussain Muhammad Ershad on 1 November 1984 declared it a government college.

== Academic departments ==
- HSC
- Department of Arts
- Department of Business Studies
- Department of Science
- Information and Communication Technology
- Department of Sociology
