= Government Engineering College, Dahod =

Engineering college in India

- Other name: GEC Dahod / GECD
- Motto: तमसो मा ज्योतिर्गमय
- Type: Government Institution, Technical Institute
- Established: 2004
- Accreditation: All India Council of Technical Education
- Academic affiliations: Gujarat Technological University
- Principal: Dr. K. B. Judal
- Students: 2400
- Location: Jhalod Road, Dahod, Gujarat, India
- Campus: 17 acres (6.9 ha)
- Website: www.gecdahod.ac.in

The Government Engineering College, Dahod (GECD or GEC Dahod) is one of the 18 Government Engineering Colleges in Gujarat. It was established in 2004. It specializes in the fields of engineering and technology. The institute is recognized by the All India Council for Technical Education (AICTE), New Delhi. The college is administered by the Directorate of Technical Education in Gandhinagar, Gujarat, India, and is affiliated with Gujarat Technological University (GTU), Ahmedabad.

== Organisation and administration ==
The college offers several undergraduate courses leading to Bachelor of Engineering (B.E.) degrees (number of seats in brackets):

- Electronics and Communication Engineering
- Computer Engineering
- Mechanical Engineering
- Electrical Engineering
- Civil Engineering

The college also offers postgraduate courses leading to Master of Engineering (M.E.) degrees:

- Applied Mechanics (CASAD)
- Mechanical Engineering (Specialization in CAD/CAM)

=== Department of Electronics & Communication Engineering ===
Electronics and Communication Department was established in 2004 situated at academic building block no. 4. It has laboratories in thrust and on developing path in areas of Audio-Visual, Analog and Digital Communication, Microwave, VLSI Design and Signal Processing. Department has Computer Centre with all latest computer facilities. Every year, modern equipment is being purchased to remain in tune with the advancement in the field of Electronics & Communication, Microwave and Information Technology etc. The Computer laboratory of this department is equipped with computer systems latest processor with multimedia, software and LAN systems.

Areas of Electronics & Communication – Analog & Digital Electronics, Analog & Digital Communication, Antenna Systems, Microwave Engineering, Fiber Optic Communication, Computer Hardware and Networking, Micro Processor and Micro Controller, Digital Signal Processing, VLSI Design.

=== Department of Computer Engineering ===
Computer Engineering was introduced in GEC Dahod from year 2009. Its first batch was graduated in the year in 2013–14. The department is located on first floor of Block No. 4 in college campus. With the intake of 60 and adequate staff, the department has ample amount of class rooms and labs on its own floor. Teaching and Lab work is carried out with intention to help students overcome practical difficulties. All the subject lectures and laboratories are engaged by departmental staff and even visiting faculties are appointed as and when needed.

==== Facilities ====
- The department has 5 labs equipped with total 110 desktop computers.
- Computers with advanced Quad-Core AMD (3.6 GHz) and Intel i5 processors are used by students and faculties to perform basic programming to parallel processing.
- All the computers are equipped with software tools / IDEs to support program development.
- Final year students work on projects in groups or individuals according to syllabus of GTU.
- The project work is divided in two phases which are undertaken by students in seventh and eighth semester. Current projects undertaken by students are API development in php, using Facebook API, PHP programming and Android application development.
- Creative workshops like are organized every year to expose students to real world applications.
- Students of final year are encouraged to undertake good industry standard projects.
- Computer Engineering department maintains domain name and web-site for college since year 2012.

=== Department of Mechanical Engineering ===
Mechanical Engineering Department is established in the year 2004 with intake capacity of 60 students. To enhance the qualitative education, the intake has been increased to 120 students in the year 2009. This department has also started the post graduate course of M.E with specialization of CAD/CAM in the year 2010. This department is facilitated wIth all essential laboratories and equipments according to the curriculum of Gujarat technological University.

=== Department of Electrical Engineering ===
The department is in the Engineering Block -3 building, share with General Department at first floor. At the beginning in 2004 the department has 60 students intake but later on in 2009 the intake capacity of the department is double as 120 students per year.

=== Department of Civil Engineering ===
Civil Engineering Department has started right from the inception of this institute with an intake capacity of 60 students; later on this intake capacity is double and today is 120 students per year. The Civil Engineering Department is also looking after the civil construction of the institute and maintains the same in liaison with R&B Department of Government of Gujarat.

== Academics ==
GEC Dahod started with the intake of 60 students each for civil, mechanical, electrical and electronics and communication department. The intake for civil, mechanical and electrical branches has doubled today making it 120 students intake for each. The intake is 60 students each for EC and Computer Engineering department. Civil and Mechanical departments also run Post Graduate programs affiliated to GTU each with intake of 18 students.

	Civil Engineering	Mechanical Engineering	Electrical Engineering	E.C. Engineering	Computer Engineering
Intake Per Year for Under Graduate Program	90	90	30	30	60
Intake (2020)for Under Graduate Program	90	90	30	30	60
Intake Per Year for Post Graduate Program	18	18	0	0	0

GEC Dahod has two boys hostels located within the campus. One girls hostel located in the campus of Technical High school, Dahod near Circuit House.

The college runs 5 four year full-time programs of Bachelors of Engineering in above mentioned discipline.

=== Admission ===
GEC Dahod is a fully government funded institute. The candidates who have passed the HSC examination (Science Stream) by the Gujarat Higher-Secondary/Central Board of Higher Secondary (within Gujarat state only) with Physics, Chemistry, Mathematics subjects as group A, are eligible for admission.

Students from other states may apply according to quota allocated to their states. These applications are not taken at college. The students have to contact ACPC, Ahmedabad for this. The ACPC (Admission Committee for Professional Courses) is a centralized body run by the government of Gujarat that fills up 100% of total seats on merit basis of total of Normalized Merit Rank that includes percentage wise weight of state level exam and/or JEE MAIN Exam.

=== Examination system ===
Examination System is according to Gujarat Technological University Scheme.

==== Internal examination ====
Internal examination, submission of term work and university external examination, together make an individual eligible for passing (for each subject). All have to appear for the internal examination. For passing, a minimum 40% marks are required.

==== University examination ====
The university examination is conducted at the end of every semester/year for the subjects. Minimum passing standard is 40% in each head. A student securing 30% marks in the theory may be declared passed if the total marks scored in the subject is 45%.

=== Institute Internet Facility ===
- GEC Dahod is a node of NKN (National Knowledge Network) which is a national initiative to connect technical campuses all over India.
- The college is equipped with high speed Wifi facility (NaMo Wifi) by The Government of Gujarat throughout the campus.
- Computer department handles internet facility and campus wide LAN.
- There are above 400 LAN nodes spread over all the campus including amenities building, workshop and library.
- Library is equipped with SOUL software to manage more than 14,000 volumes.

== Student life ==
=== Hostel ===
Government Engineering College, Dahod has two hostels, each for boys and girls. Boys Hostel is located inside the college campus. It has capacity of 120 students. The admission to first batch commenced in academic year 2013–14. Admissions to hostel are done every year based on number of vacant seats at that time.

The Girls Hostel for Government Engineering College, Dahod is located within the Dahod city. It is inside the campus of Technical High School and near to Circuit House and Police Headquarters, Dahod. It has capacity of 54 students.

=== Events and festivals ===
Some of the annual events are held at GECD.

- "Ignite" is an annual technical festival of GECD held during the month of January or February. Various events are organised from each department such as hackathons, robotics, etc.
- Sports Week is organised which includes outdoor and indoor games and sports like Cricket, Carrom, Chess, Badminton, Table Tennis etc.
