= Government College Ground Mirpur =

Sporting venue in Pakistan

- Location: Mirpur Azad Kashmir, Pakistan
- Surface: Hard

Tenants
- Pilot FC & Youth FC

Government College Ground Mirpur is a multi-purpose ground in Mirpur Azad Kashmir, Pakistan. It is the home of the Pilot Football Club & Youth Football Club.
