= Sarvajanik College of Engineering and Technology =

Coordinates: 21.182°N 72.808°E

SCET (Sarvajanik College of Engineering and Technology)
- Motto: तमसो मां ज्योतिगॅमय
- Type: Education and Research Institution
- Established: 1995
- Administrative staff: 200 (approx)
- Undergraduates: 2000 (approx)
- Location: Surat, Gujarat, India
- Campus: Urban
- Website: www.scet.ac.in

The Sarvajanik College of Engineering and Technology (SCET) is an engineering college that is a part of the Sarvajanik Education Society. Sarvajanik Education Society's proposal for state university was accepted by Gujarat assembly on 30 March 2021.

Founded in 1995, the college is situated in Surat, Gujarat, on RK Desai Marg in the Athwalines area, directly across from Jawaharlal Nehru Udhyan (Chaupaty). It is part of the Sarvajanik Education Society Campus, conveniently located near P.T. Science College, M.T.B. Arts College, and K.P. Commerce College.

== Courses ==
When SCET opened in 1995, it had departments of Electronics Engineering, Chemical Engineering, Architecture, Textile Technology and Processing. It was the first college to offer engineering degrees in Textiles, which is the major industry of Surat.

In 1997, the college underwent a significant expansion, adding departments of Computer Engineering, Electrical Engineering, Instrumentation & Control, and Information Technology. Additionally, a new department dedicated to Environmental Science was established.

=== Undergraduate ===
Courses of study include Bachelor of Technology (B.Tech):

- Chemical Engineering
- Civil Engineering
- Computer Engineering
- Electrical Engineering - NBA Accredited since 2017
- Electronics and Communication Engineering - NBA Accredited since 2017
- Information Technology
- Artificial intelligence and Data science
- Instrumentation and control engineering - NBA Accredited since 2017
- Mechanical Engineering

=== Postgraduate ===
- Master of Engineering in Civil Engineering (Town & Country Planning)
- Master of Engineering in Civil Engineering (Structure)
- Master of Engineering in Computer Engineering
- Master of Engineering in Electronics and Communication Engineering (2011 to 2020)
- Master of Engineering in Electrical Engineering (2011 to 2020)
- Master of Engineering in Environmental Engineering
- Master of Computer Application (M.C.A.)
- Master of Architecture (M.Arch.) in City Design

== Affiliations and recognitions ==
SCET is affiliated to Sarvajanik University, earlier it was affiliated to Gujarat Technological University (GTU) and before that to Veer Narmad South Gujarat University. It is approved by All India Council for Technical Education (AICTE) for all engineering courses and by Council of Architecture for B Arch and M Arch.

It was selected by the Department of Science and Technology (India) to set up an environmental based project, Technology Information Forecasting and Assessment Council, Centre of Relevance & Excellence (TIFAC-CORE) under the mission REACH of the president of India Dr. A.P.J. Abdul Kalam for his vision India Vision 2020. SCET has been identified as Resource Institute by the National Programme on Earthquake Engineering Education (NPEEE) launched by Ministry of Human Resource Development (India) to train teachers of architecture for introducing Earthquake Engineering in West and Central Zone with IIT Kanpur.

== See also ==
- List of tourist attractions in Surat
