= Government College for Men Nazimabad =

Degree college in Karachi, Pakistan

Government College For Men Nazimabad Karachi
- Type: Intermediate & Degree College
- Established: 1953
- Affiliations: Board of Intermediate Education Karachi, University of Karachi
- Principal: Prof. Arif Alvi
- Undergraduates: B.Sc and B.Com
- Location: Karachi, Sindh, Pakistan
- Website: https://govt-college-formen.vercel.app/

Government College for Men, Nazimabad is an all-male degree college located in Karachi, Pakistan, adjacent to the flyover located in Nazimabad town.

== Departments ==
The college has the following departments:

- Computer Science
- Statistics
- Mathematics
- Accounting
- Business Math
- Principle of Commerce
- English
- Physics
- Botany
- Chemistry
- Islamic Studies
- Physical Education and Sports
- Urdu
- Zoology
- Geography

== Admission ==
The college offers the in Pre-and Pre-for the Board of Intermediate, Karachi (B.I.E.K)under CAP (Centralized Admission Policy). For undergraduate level, the college offers a combination of from any three of the following subjects (Mathematics, Physics, Chemistry, logy, Statistics, biology, chemistry, Botany & Zoology)

== History ==
The college was established in 1953 under the name of Central Government College for Men to provide higher education to the newly settled and prominent area of Nazimabad in Karachi. The college was taken over by the Government of Sindh in 1961, and since then named as Government College for Men Nazimabad, Karachi.

Principals of Government College for Men Nazimabad, Karachi.

- Athar Rasheed
- Abdul Mateen
- S. Safdar Hussain
- S. M. H. Jafri
- S. M. Ahmed
- M. A. Rauf
- Rashid Ahmed Khan
- A. Salam
- N. A. Farooqi
- A. R. A. Samo
- Zahir Ahmed
- Abdul Latif
- Kamaluddin
- M. A. Hai Moosa
- Syed Kamaluddin
- Jamal Ashraf Ansari
- Abdul Wahab Khan
- Mazharul Haq
- S. Khurshid Haider Zaidi
- Muhammad Zarrar Khan
- Naveed Ahmed Hashmi
- Ismail Jawaid
- Naveed Ahmed Hashmi
- Muhammad Rizwan

== Library ==
Library of Government College for Men Nazimabad, Karachi is a two-story building, the upper story of which serves place for calm and busy researchers. The lower story is working as reading hall for the students. Presently, the library has more than 25000 books on different subjects. The leading dailies of the country are available in the Reading Hall.

Government College for Men, Nazimabad was established in 1953 under the name of Central Government College for Men to provide higher education to the newly settled and prominent area of Nazimabad in Karachi. The college was taken over by the Government of Sindh in 1961 and since then named as Government College for Men, Nazimabad

The college library is situated in front of the main entrance of the college building. Today, the college library has a collection of over 18,500 reference books, encyclopedias, dictionaries, manuals, atlases, computer etc.

== Notable alumni ==
- Sarfaraz Ahmed (Pakistani wicket-keeper batsman)
