= Govt. Science College, Chatrapur =

College in Ganjam, Orissis, India

Government Science College, Chatrapur
- Type: Public
- Established: 1969 (college)
- Affiliations: Berhampur University
- Students: Undergraduate and Post graduate
- Location: Chatrapur, Ganjam, Orissa, India; 19.350166°N 84.984420°E
- Campus: Urban
- Website: www.gscc.ac.in

Government Science College, Chatrapur is an Indian public college. It is located at Chatrapur, Ganjam in the Indian state of Orissa. It affiliated with BERHAMPUR UNIVERSITY and Council of Higher Secondary Education Odisha.

== History ==
The college was established in 1969 as a Private College at the Ganjam District Headquarters. It was taken over by the Government on 10 July 1982. It became a lead college of the state in 1993. It became accredited at the 'B' level by the National Assessment and Accreditation Council (NAAC) in 2006.

== Description ==
The college offers streams of Science, Commerce, and Arts for undergraduate and Post graduate programs. It educates 11th to Post graduation. in Arts, Science and Commerce. For the graduate program, Biological Science offers 64 seats, Physical science Chemistry and physics have 48 seats and mathematics offer 32 seats.Arts History and Pol science 64 Seats, Odia and Economics 48 seats, and English 32 seats.and Commerce 256 seats. Postgraduate programmes in History, Oriya Political science, English, Economics and commerce have 32 seats and Physics, Chemistry, Mathematics, Botany and Zoology feature, 16 seats each. The college has a good library, Reading room. Digital libraryas well as NCC and Scout facilities. Separate rooms are available for males and females. More than 1700 undergraduate, & post-graduate students enroll.

== Departments ==
The college runs Science, Arts, and Commerce streams.

=== Faculty of Science ===
- Physics
- Chemistry
- Mathematics
- Botany
- Zoology.

=== Faculty Of Arts ===
- English
- Economics
- History
- Mathematics
- Oriya
- Political science

=== Faculty Of Commerce ===
- Commerce
