= Government Engineering College, Gandhinagar =

Government institute for BE and ME in Gandhinagar

- Other name: GECG
- Type: Government
- Established: 2004
- Accreditation: All India Council of Technical Education
- Affiliations: Gujarat Technological University
- Academic affiliations: Gujarat Technological University
- Principal: Dr. Sweta P. Dave
- Faculty: 32
- Students: Around 3000
- Undergraduates: Around 3000
- Postgraduates: 36
- Location: Near Animal Vaccine Institute, Sector-28, Gandhinagar, Gujarat, 383028, India; 23.2591°N 72.6537°E
- Campus: Urban, 33 acres (13 ha)
- Language: English
- Website: www.gecg28.ac.in

Established in 2004, Government Engineering College, Gandhinagar (GEC-Gn) is administrated by Directorate of Technical Education, Gujarat State, Gandhinagar. The college is affiliated to Gujarat Technological University.

== General ==
The candidates who have passed the HSC examination (Science Stream) by the Gujarat Higher-Secondary/Central Board of Higher Secondary (within Gujarat state only) with Physics, Chemistry, Mathematics subjects as group A, are eligible for admission.

The ACPC Centralized Admission Committee constituted by the government of Gujarat fills up 100% of total seats on merit basis of total of Normalized Merit Rank (obtained from 60% of H.S.C. Examination + 40% of GUJCET Examination conducted by GSEB as for academic year 2018–2019)

Additionally, in the 2nd year of BE, students of diploma engineering who have completed their studies can also take admission by DDCET Examination (Diploma to Degree Common Entrance Test) directly into the 2nd year of BE through the ACPC.

== Departments ==
The college offers seven undergraduate courses leading to Bachelor of Engineering (B.E.) degrees (number of seats in brackets):

- Electronics and Communication Engineering (120),
- Computer Engineering (120),
- Information Technology (60),
- Biomedical Engineering (120),
- Instrumentation and Control Engineering (120),
- Metallurgy Engineering (60),
- Mechanical Engineering (60),
- Civil Engineering (90),
- Robotics and Automation Engineering (60),
- Electrical Engineering (60)

The college also offers two postgraduate courses leading to Master of Engineering (M.E.) degrees (number of seats in brackets):

- Biomedical Engineering (18),
- Computer Engineering (18),

== Department of Instrumentation and Control Engineering ==
The Instrumentation and Control Engineering Department started with the opening of the college in 2004. The department offers an undergraduate course B.E.(Instrumentation and Control). Department has well equipped labs for Signal and System, Measurement, Instrumentation, Power electronics as well as PLC's.

== Campus ==
The college campus is spread over 33 acres (130,000 m^{2}), and a new hostel campus was ready for use beginning in 2012–2013.

== Facilities ==
- College provides hostel in campus for boys and girls
- Boys hostel is having 94 rooms (per room three students) with capacity of 282.
- Girls hostel is having 60 rooms (per room three students) with capacity of 180
- College share a classrooms for Indian Institute of Information Technology, Vadodara
- Students can access free internet from Wi-fi
- GECG Alumni Association in college. Which passed out students encourage and assist the students of institute for various curricular activities.
- A GYM building is available for GYM activities. The students conduct sports, indoor games, social services, cultural activities, and debates in it. Blood donation camps are organized.
- The canteen provides food to the students and the staff.
- The 100-seat auditorium and C.V.Raman Hall used for technical events, lectures and seminars
- Student stores supply items such as stationery and calculators. The students co-operatively run the store on the college premises.

== Training and placement ==
A training and placement cell is in touch with industry. Many former students in various multinational companies.

== Examination system ==
Examination System is according to Gujarat Technological University Scheme.

=== Internal examination ===
Internal examination, submission of term work and university external examination, together make an individual eligible for passing (for each subject).

All have to appear for the internal examination. For passing, a minimum 40% marks are required. Students scoring less than 40% marks will have to submit an assignment or have to attend for retake exam given by the subject professor.

=== University examination ===
The university examination is conducted at the end of every semester/year for the subjects. Minimum passing standard is 40% in each head. A student securing 30% marks in the theory may be declared passed if the total marks scored in the subject is 45%.
