= Government Mahila Engineering College =

Coordinates: 26.4006511°N 74.6594122°E

Government Mahila Engineering College, Ajmer
- Type: Public Engineering College
- Established: 2007
- Affiliations: Bikaner Technical University
- Principal: Prof. Prakriti Trivedi
- Location: Ajmer, Rajasthan, India
- Website: Official website

Government Mahila Engineering College, Ajmer is a public engineering college for women located in Ajmer, Rajasthan, India. It was established in 2007 by the Government of Rajasthan and is affiliated with Bikaner Technical University. It is approved by the All India Council for Technical Education (AICTE), New Delhi. The college is now affiliated with Bikaner Technical University and is approved by AICTE.

== History ==
Government Mahila Engineering College Ajmer (GWECA) was started in the year 2007 by the Government of Rajasthan. The main aim was to provide technical education to women and increase their participation in engineering and related fields. It is known as the first government engineering college for women in North India. The foundation of the college was laid by the then Chief Minister Vasundhara Raje on 30 April 2007. In the beginning, the college was affiliated to Rajasthan Technical University (RTU), Kota, but later it became part of Bikaner Technical University (BTU). All courses offered by the college are approved by AICTE (All India Council for Technical Education).

The college is located on Nasirabad Road, Ajmer, about 11 km from Pushkar, and has a campus of around 30–40 acres. It includes classrooms, laboratories, a library, hostels, seminar halls, sports areas, and other student facilities like a canteen and college buses.

== Campus ==
The campus of Government Mahila Engineering College, Ajmer is located on Nasirabad Road (NH–79) in Makhupura, on the outskirts of Ajmer city, Rajasthan. It is situated approximately 11 km from Pushkar and around 10 km from Ajmer railway station, making it accessible by road and rail. The total campus area covers approximately 30 to 40 acres.

== Academics ==
The college offers undergraduate (B.Tech) and postgraduate (M.Tech and MCA) programs in various engineering and computer science fields. Admissions to B.Tech courses are done through the Rajasthan Engineering Admission Process (REAP), and MCA admissions are through the RMCAAP.

== Departments ==
The college offers a variety of undergraduate, postgraduate, and doctoral programs in engineering, technology, computer applications, and management. Each department is equipped with relevant laboratories, classrooms, and academic resources to support learning and research.

=== Undergraduate Programs (B.Tech) ===
Computer Science and Engineering (CSE)

- Focuses on computer programming, software development, algorithms, data structures, and artificial intelligence.

Electrical and Electronics Engineering (EEE)

- Covers topics in electrical machines, power electronics, control systems, and embedded systems.

Electrical Engineering (EE)

- Focuses on power systems, electrical machines, instrumentation, and renewable energy technologies.

Electronics and Communication Engineering (ECE)

- Deals with electronic devices, communication systems, VLSI design, and signal processing.

Information Technology (IT)

- Includes web technologies, database systems, computer networks, and software engineering.

Mechanical Engineering (ME)

- Offers education in mechanics, thermal engineering, manufacturing processes, and CAD/CAM.

Artificial Intelligence and Machine Learning (AI & ML)

- Focuses on machine learning, deep learning, data science, and intelligent systems.

Computer Science and Engineering (Cyber Security)

- Covers cybersecurity principles, cryptography, network security, and digital forensics.

=== Postgraduate Programs ===
M.Tech in Computer Science and Engineering

M.Tech in Digital Communication

M.Tech in Power Systems

Master in Computer Applications (MCA)

Master of Business Administration (MBA)

=== Doctoral Programs (Ph.D.) ===
The college offers Ph.D. programs in the following disciplines:

Electronics and Communication Engineering (ECE)

Electrical Engineering (EE)

=== Additional Academic Units ===
Training and Placement Cell

- Facilitates campus recruitment, internships, soft skill development, and industry interaction for students.

Research and Development (R&D) Cell

- Supports research projects, innovation, faculty publications, and collaboration with other institutions.

== Facilities ==
The institution provides basic academic and residential facilities such as classrooms, computer labs, a central library, hostels for students, and a canteen. Internet access and digital learning tools are also available on campus.

== Student life ==
The college hosts various academic, cultural, and extracurricular activities throughout the year. Events include technical fests, seminars, workshops, and cultural programs. Sports activities and student clubs are also part of campus life.

== Affiliation and accreditation ==
The college is affiliated to Bikaner Technical University and approved by AICTE. It follows the academic regulations and curriculum prescribed by the university.

== See also ==
- Engineering education in India
- Bikaner Technical University
- All India Council for Technical Education
- Rajasthan Technical University
- National Institutional Ranking Framework
