= Government Pharmacy College, Bengaluru =

Coordinates: 12°57′43.59″N 77°35′26.29″E

Government Pharmacy College, Bangalore is a pharmacy college located in Bangalore, India, run by the government of Karnataka. It was established in 1964 and is affiliated with the Rajiv Gandhi University of Health Sciences. It is ranked among the top ten pharmacy institutions in India.

== The former principals ==
- R. G. Battu
- M. Desai
- P.P. Thampi
- M. Lakshmana
- M.S.Niranjan
- K.P.Chennabasavaraju
- Dr. Ramachandra Setty S
- Dr. Gurunath Kalaskar
- Dr. Vijaya G Joshi

== Notable alumni ==
- Dr.J.Jagadish,Senior pharmacologist,U.S.F.D.A
