= Dr. V. M. Government Medical College =

Medical school in Solapur, India

Dr. Vaishampayan Memorial Government Medical College (VMGMC) is a medical college located in Solapur, Maharashtra. The college was named after its founder, Dr. Vishnu Ganesh Vaishampayan (1893-1964). The college is run by the state government of Maharashtra, India and regulated by the Directorate of Medical Education and Research, Mumbai.

== History ==
Solapur has a predominantly rural population. A medical college in this city was founded by Dr. Vishnu Ganesh Vaishampayan in 1963. It was taken over by the Government of Maharashtra in 1974. At present the college has state-of-the-art facilities for undergraduate as well as postgraduate medical education.

Until recently the college was affiliated to the Shivaji University, Kolhapur for all the courses offered by it. Both undergraduate and postgraduate courses are now affiliated to Maharashtra University of Health Sciences, Nashik which houses around 5000 medical graduates.

== Education ==
Every year this medical school admits students ranking in the top 1 percentile of the NEET UG examination. There are 200 undergraduate students studying for the MBBS (Bachelor of Medicine and Bachelor of Surgery) every year from 2019.

== Hospital ==
Shri. Chattrapati Shivaji Maharaj General Hospital (attached to Dr. V. M. Govt. Medical College) is a large state run hospital with over 750 beds, 1200-1500 outpatients/day, an average of 30 births/day, a casualty/emergency which attends to around 500 patients a day, a 15-bed ICU, a Pediatric ICU, a Neonatal ICU, 10 Operation Theatres, a Cardio Vascular Unit, an AKD Unit, a Trauma Unit, a Surgery Unit performing simple and advanced surgeries, a well equipped Radiology department, along with Blood Bank, Hematology, Biochemistry, Pathology, Microbiology and Forensic Laboratory.

== Medical research ==
The medical school encourages its students to inculcate scientific temper by associating with several research opportunities with the departments in the hospital. The research on Pranayama Physiology by the Department of Sports Physiology is one of the recent path-breaking researches to have been conducted at the institution. Several clinical trials are run in with clinicians in the hospital.

== Medical journal ==
The online Solapur Medical Journal is published by the college. This provides a platform for the publication of research undergoing in this college.

== Notable alumni ==
- Mohan S. Gundeti, urologist
