= G. H. Patel College of Engineering and Technology =

Indian college in Gujarat

G H Patel College of Engineering and Technology
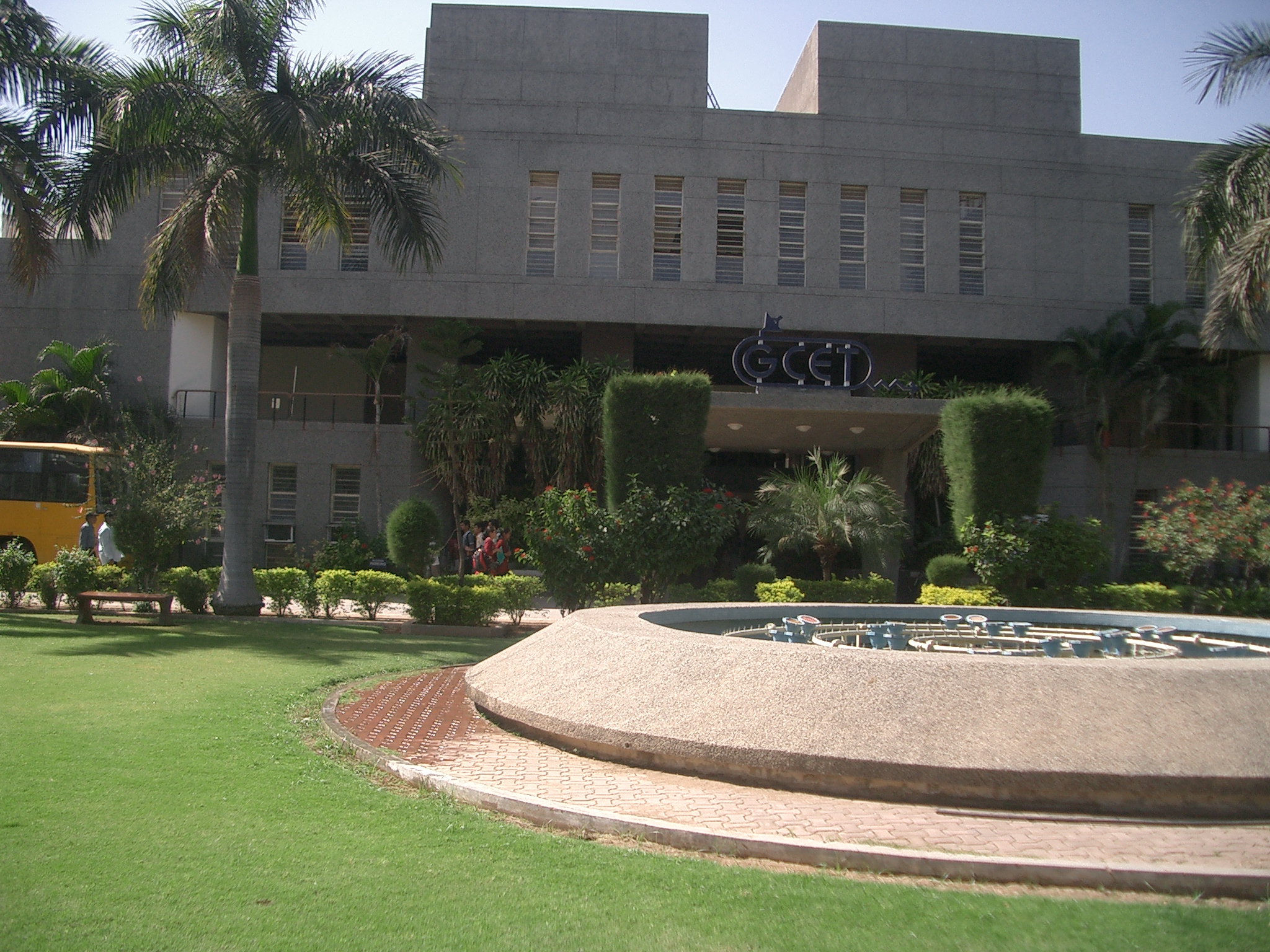
- Motto: निर्मिति विश्वसुखाय
- Established: 1996
- Principal: Dr. Kaushik Nath
- Undergraduates: 540
- Postgraduates: 168
- Location: Vallabh Vidyanagar, Gujarat, India; 22°33′36.36″N 72°55′10.56″E
- Campus: Vallabh Vidhyanagar
- Affiliations: CVM University
- Website: www.gcet.ac.in

G H Patel College of Engineering and Technology (GCET) is a private engineering college in Vallabh Vidyanagar, Gujarat, India. GCET is affiliated with the CVM Univered at number 53, at number 42 in 2014 and at number 28 in 2015 among the Top 100 Engineering Colleges of India by DataQuest. In 2006, GCET was named as one of the top 100 engineering schools in India by Outlook.

== Previous Principals and Leaders ==
- Professor Dr. N D Jotwani
- Professor Dr. Ketan Kotecha
- Professor Dr. Himanshu Soni
- Professor Dr. Kaushik Nath
