= Government College of Technology, Bahawalpur =

Technical college in Pakistan

Coordinates: 29°23′06.19″N 71°42′45.05″E

The Government College of Technology, Bahawalpur is a post-secondary technical college in Bahawalpur, Pakistan.

It was established in 1962 as the Government Polytechnic Institute. The college provides technical education, particularly for the people of Bahawalpur District and generally for the whole of Punjab.

Examinations are conducted under the Punjab Board of Technical Education, Lahore. In this college, there are seven different technologies which the students are being taught. Classes are taught in English as well as Urdu. Second shift classes have been introduced in Electrical, Civil and Mechanical Technologies since 1986/1987. Second shift classes are designed to make it easier for as many local students as possible to receive a technical education.
