= Government College of Technology, Faisalabad =

Pakistani school

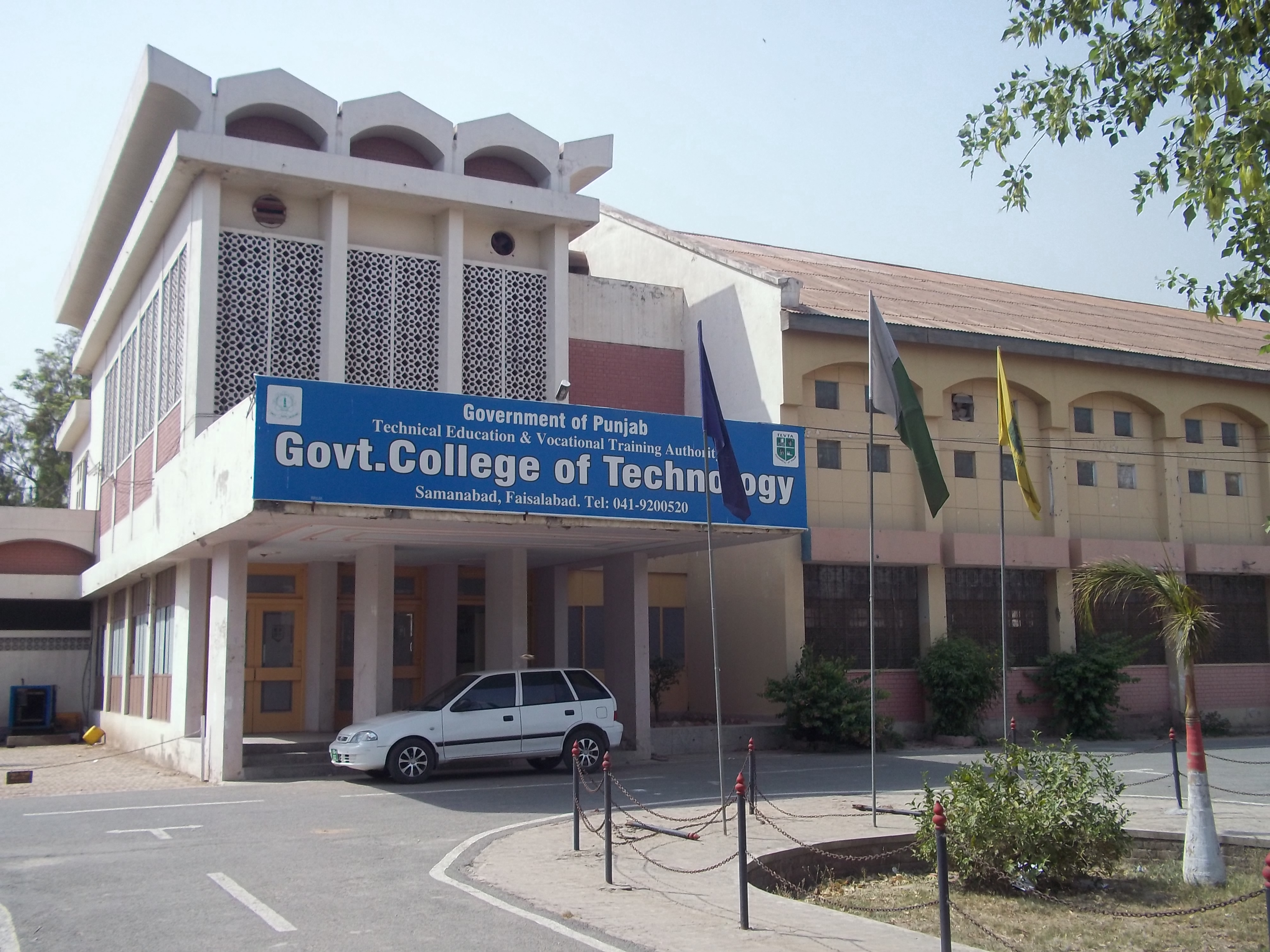
- Other names: GCT Faisalabad
- Motto: Leading to The Technology Education
- Type: Public
- Established: 1966
- Affiliations: Technical Education and Vocational Training Authority, Punjab; Punjab Board of Technical Education, Lahore; University of Engineering and Technology, Lahore
- Location: Faisalabad, Punjab, Pakistan; 31.3911°N 73.0605°E
- Website: gctfsd.edu.pk

The Government College of Technology, Faisalabad is a public college located in Samanabad Faisalabad, Punjab, Pakistan. It was established in 1966 as Government Polytechnic Institute and upgraded as Government College of Technology in 1981.

== Academics ==
=== Diploma of Associate Engineering (DAE) programs ===
The college offers following three-year Diploma of Associate Engineering (DAE) programs:

- Civil technology
- Electrical technology
- Food technology
- Instrumentation technology
- Mechanical technology
- Mechanical (power) technology specialization in auto and farm machinery technology
- Textile dying and printing technology
- Two years diploma in culinary arts

=== Bachelor's program ===
The college also offers following bachelor's degree program:

BSc Electrical engineering technology

== See also ==
Jinnah Polytechnic Institute, Faisalabad
