= Government College for Women Dhoke Kala Khan =

Government College for Women Dhoke Kala Khan, Rawalpindi
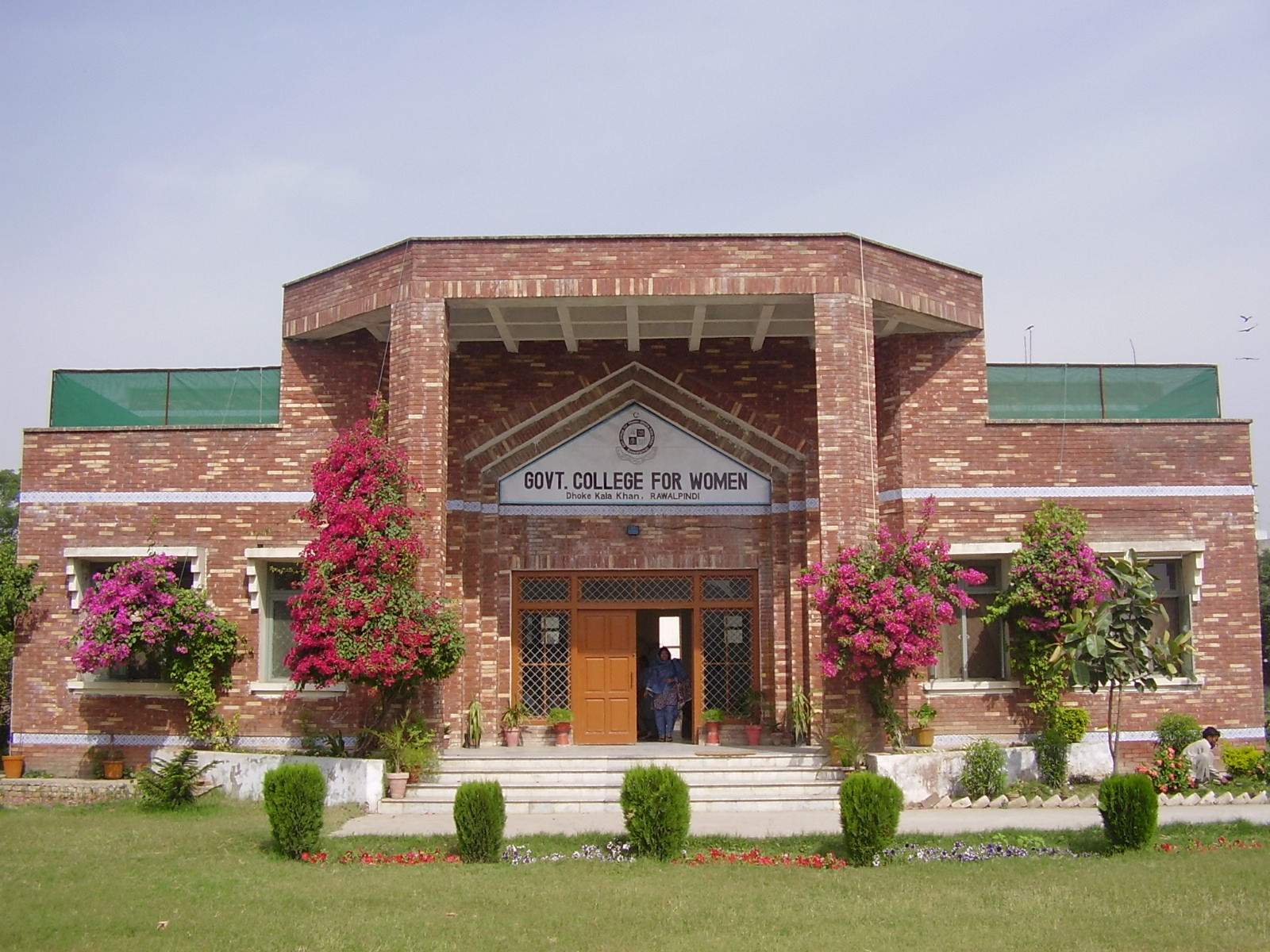
- Type: Public
- Established: 2004
- Affiliations: Rawalpindi Board of Intermediate and Secondary Education, Rawalpindi
- Principal: Mrs Ghazala Yasmin
- Administrative staff: 15
- Students: 500
- Location: Rawalpindi, Pakistan

Government College for Women Dhoke Kala Khan is situated in Rawalpindi, Punjab, Pakistan. It was established for women in 2004, and is located just a kilometer away from Faizabad, Islamabad.

Science is taught at intermediate level and arts at graduation and intermediate level.

The students are around 500 and the number of staff is 30. Government College for Women Dhoke Kala Khan, Rawalpindi was inaugurated by Sheikh Rasheed Ahmad. The then Federal Minister who made a lot of girls schools in Rwp. Source : Junaid Sultan Resident of Dhok kala Khan Rawalpindi.

== See also ==
- Government College Asghar Mall Rawalpindi
