= Government College University Faisalabad =

Public university in Pakistan

- Former names: Government College, Faisalabad
- Motto: Striving For Excellence
- Type: Public
- Established: 1897; 129 years ago
- Founder: baba amjid english wala
- Accreditation: Higher Education Commission of Pakistan; Pakistan Engineering Council; Pakistan Bar Council; Pharmacy Council of Pakistan; National Technology Council
- Chancellor: Governor of the Punjab
- Vice-Chancellor: Dr. Rauf-i-Azam
- Location: Faisalabad, Punjab, Pakistan; 31.4161°N 73.0700°E
- Campus: 37 Acres (Main Campus) & 200 Acres (New Campus); Urban
- Colors: Maroon and blue
- Nickname: GCUF
- Website: gcuf.edu.pk

The Government College University Faisalabad (colloquially known as GCUF) is a public university located in Faisalabad, Punjab, Pakistan.

== History ==
The educational institution was established as a primary school in 1897 in the present building of Government College for Women, Karkhana Bazar, Faisalabad. It was promoted to high school and intermediate college in 1905 and 1924, respectively. In 1933, it was elevated to the degree level and postgraduate disciplines were introduced in 1963. The government of Punjab declared it as an autonomous institution in 1990. It was further given the status of a university in 2002. The university is located on Kotwali Road.

== Faculties ==
- College of Law GCUF
- Arts & Social Sciences
- Economics & Management Sciences
- Engineering & Technology
- Islamic & Oriental Learning
- Life Sciences
- Pharmaceutical Sciences
- Physical Sciences
- Medical Sciences
- Basic Sciences
