= Mindtree =

Indian multinational technology company

- Type: Public
- Traded as: BSE: 532819; NSE: MINDTREE
- ISIN: INE018I01017
- Industry: Information technology Consulting; Outsourcing
- Founded: 18 August 1999; 27 years ago
- Founder: Ashok Soota; Subroto Bagchi; Krishnakumar Natarajan; Parthasarathy NS; Scott Staples; Anjan Lahiri; Kalyankumar Banerjee; Janakiraman; Kamran Ozair; Rostow Ravanan
- Defunct: 2022
- Fate: Merged with Larsen & Toubro Infotech (LTI)
- Successor: LTIMindtree
- Headquarters: Global Village Tech Park, Bangalore, Karnataka, India
- Area served: Worldwide
- Key people: A.M. Naik (Non-Executive Chairman); S. N. Subrahmanyan (Non-Exe Vice-Chairman); Debashis Chatterjee (MD & CEO)
- Revenue: ▲₹10,520 crore (US$1.1 billion) (2022)
- Operating income: ▲₹1,953.5 crore (US$200 million) (2022)
- Net income: ▲₹1,652.9 crore (US$170 million) (2022)
- Total assets: ▲₹5,156.60 crore (US$540 million) (2020)
- Total equity: ▼₹3,156.80 crore (US$330 million) (2020)
- Number of employees: 38,518 (July 2022)
- Parent: Larsen & Toubro (61.08%)
- Website: www.mindtree.com

Mindtree Limited was an Indian multinational information technology services and consulting company, headquartered in Bangalore. Mindtree was acquired by Larsen & Toubro in 2019, before being merged with L&T Infotech (LTI) in 2022 to form LTIMindtree.

The company had business interests in e-commerce, mobile applications, cloud computing, digital transformation, data analytics, testing, enterprise application integration, and enterprise resource planning. Mindtree had more than 307 active clients and 43 offices in over 18 countries, as of 31 March 2019.

== History ==
In August 1999, Mindtree Consulting Private Limited was founded by ten IT professionals, three of which invested through an entity incorporated in Mauritius. It was funded by the venture capital firms Walden International and Sivan Securities and received further funding in 2001 from the Capital Group and Franklin Templeton.

It became a public company in December 2006, and was listed on the Bombay Stock Exchange and National Stock Exchange. Its IPO debuted in February 2007, and closed in February 2007. The IPO was oversubscribed by more than a hundred times.

Mindtree announced a new brand identity and logo, with the slogan "Welcome to possible" in September 2012. In 2012, Mindtree set up its first U.S. delivery center (USDC) in Gainesville, Florida, under the leadership of Scott Staples, co-founder and Global Head of Sales.

In 2017, the company had 43 offices in over 17 countries.

Larsen & Toubro (L&T), an infrastructure major and one of the largest conglomerates in India, took over control of Mindtree in June 2019 and currently has a 61.08% stake in the company. L&T's takeover of Mindtree was described at the time as the first hostile takeover in the Indian IT industry.

In March 2020, Mindtree announced the appointment of Dayapatra Nevatia as COO with immediate effect. He joins the company from Accenture where he was the managing director as well as the director for delivery for advanced technology centers in India.

In May 2022, L&T announced that Mindtree will be merged into Larsen & Toubro Infotech (LTI). The merger was completed in November 2022 and the combined entity was named LTIMindtree.

== Services ==
Mindtree works in Application Development and Maintenance, Data Analytics, Digital Services, Enterprise Application Integration and Business Process Management, Engineering R&D, Enterprise Application Services, Testing, and Infrastructure Management Services.

Mindtree's business is focused clients on Banking, Capital Markets, Consumer Devices & Electronics, Consumer Packed Goods, Independent Software Vendors, Manufacturing, Insurance, Media & Entertainment, Retail, Semiconductors and the Travel and Hospitality industry.

Mindtree's workforce includes thousands of employees who serve as Microsoft Azure outsourced support agents.

== Employees ==
Mindtree has a total of 35,071 employees as of fiscal year 2022. The workforce consists of employees from over 80 nationalities working from various offices around the globe. Out of total workforce, 95% are software professionals and remaining 5% work in support and sales.

== Acquisitions ==
Name	Acquisition date	Activities	Country of HQ	Price	Employees (at acquisition)	Reference
ASAP Solutions	2004	SAP & ERP	India & United States	NA	120	
Linc Software Services Pvt Ltd	2005	Application development and Maintenance domains for Mid-Range Systems	India	$7 million	220	
CoSystems	2005	Telecom (Captive Development Center – Indian division)	United States	₹ 10 million	20	
TES-Purple Vision	2007	Electronics(IC Design). Indian Division. Subsidiary of TES Electronic Solutions SA.	France	$6.55 million	150	
Aztecsoft	2008	Product engineering and Testing services company. Aztecsoft had previously acquired Disha Technologies, a testing company, in 2004.	India	₹ 40 million	2200	
Kyocera Wireless India Pvt Ltd	2009	Wireless services. Indian R&D Division	Japan	$6 million	600	
7Strata	2010	Remote infrastructure management services	India	₹ 7.2 million	90	
Discoverture Solutions LLC	Jan 2015	Property and Casualty Insurance	United States	$15 million	300	
Bluefin Solutions Limited	July 2015	IT solutions, SAP HANA solutions	United Kingdom	£42.3 million		
Relational Solutions Inc	July 2015	IT solutions –CPG	United States	$10 million		
Magnet 360	Jan 2016	Salesforce consulting	USA	$50 million	100	

== Subsidiaries ==
Name	Location
Mindtree Software (Shanghai) Co. Ltd	China
Bluefin Solutions Limited	United Kingdom
Bluefin Solutions Inc.	United States
Bluefin Solutions Sdn Bhd	Malaysia
Bluefin Solutions Pte Ltd	Singapore

== Philanthropy ==
Mindtree Foundation is a unit of Mindtree that works towards supporting the lives of people with disabilities and enhancement in the quality of primary education. Mindtree Foundation was incorporated in November 2007, under section 25 of Companies Act. Mindtree's employees, assistive technologies and associations with NGOs led to the following:

- The launch of 'Udaan', a scholarship program to support the medical education of underprivileged students in association with Narayana Hrudayalaya Charitable Trust.
- The launch of 'I Got Garbage', a cloud-based platform aimed to simplify waste management and transform every waste picker in Bengaluru, India, into an entrepreneur through a structured and governed waste management framework.
- Individual Social Responsibility – Employees had joined the cause of donation of old clothes/toys/books, distribution of solar lanterns, caring for the elderly, cleaning up the city, blood and organ donation.

== See also ==
- Mahindra Satyam
- List of Indian IT companies
- Software industry in Karnataka
