= Birla Vishvakarma Mahavidyalaya =

Engineering Institution in Gujarat, India

Coordinates: 22°33′8″N 72°55′25″E

- Motto: Work is Worship
- Type: Grant in Aid + Private
- Established: 1948; 78 years ago
- Academic affiliations: Gujarat Technological University
- Chairman: Er. Bhikhubhai B. Patel
- Principal: Dr. Vinay J. Patel (I/C)
- Location: Vallabh Vidyanagar, Anand, Gujarat, India
- Campus: 12 acres
- Website: www.bvmengineering.ac.in

Birla Vishvakarma Mahavidyalaya (BVM) is a Grant-In Aid + Private engineering college in Vallabh Vidyanagar, Gujarat, India. It is affiliated to Gujarat Technological University. Managed by Charutar Vidya Mandal, BVM offers graduate, postgraduate and doctoral programmes in engineering.

== History ==
Birla Vishvakarma Mahavidyalaya Engineering College was established in 1948 from donations made by the Birla Education Trust on the behest of Sardar Vallabhbhai Patel, the first Home Minister of independent India. The college was inaugurated by Lord Mountbatten, the Governor General of India on 14 June 1948, and rose to prominence under the stewardship of Prof. Junnarkar and Prof. K. M. Dholakia. It was one of the first few colleges in India that adopted the progressive credit system of relative grading in India. Also the college was first engineering college of state of Gujarat.The college has awarded degrees to over 20,000 graduates. ND Bhatt - author of books for Engineering Drawing was a faculty of this college. Dr. N C Pandya and Dr. C S Shah who have authored multiple books were Professors of Mechanical Engineering Department

== University affiliations ==
- Bombay University: June 1948– May 1951
- Gujarat University: June 1951– May 1957
- Sardar Patel University: June 1957– June 2008
- Gujarat Technological University: June 2008 - June 2015
- From 2015 onwards it has been granted autonomy. Now it is an autonomous institution.

== Academics ==
The institution offers engineering courses approved by the AICTE, for undergraduate students to doctoral scholars full- and part-time.

== Centre of excellence ==
The college has center of excellence setup by SLS setup.

== Industry collaboration ==
The college is recognized for testing of materials, BIS certifications, environmental auditing, calibration of electrical and electronics instruments and gadgets, mechanical laboratories, computer and it infrastructure.

== Admissions ==
In addition to providing admissions to high school graduates from the state of Gujarat, the college offers admissions to students from other states as well, via a competitive entrance examination.

== Notable alumni ==
- A. M. Naik, Executive Chairman, Larsen & Toubro Limited, awarded Padma Vibhushan, India's second highest civilian award, on 26 January 2019
- Bhairav Trivedi (1983 Graduate)- CEO of CAB, England
- K C Vora (1983 Graduate) - Director Baja (SAE) India and ARAI.
