= LTIMindtree =

Indian multinational IT services company

LTM Limited
- Formerly: L&T Infotech Limited (2001–2022); LTIMindtree Limited (2022–2026)
- Type: Public
- Traded as: BSE: 540005; NSE: LTM
- ISIN: INE214T01019
- Industry: Information technology Consulting; Outsourcing
- Founded: 23 December 1996; 29 years ago
- Headquarters: L&T House, Ballard Estate, Mumbai, India
- Area served: Worldwide
- Key people: S. N. Subrahmanyan (Non-Executive Chairman); Venu Lambu (CEO and Managing Director)
- Revenue: ▲₹42,308 crore (US$4.4 billion) (2026)
- Operating income: ▲₹6,515 crore (US$680 million) (2026)
- Net income: ▲₹5,018 crore (US$520 million) (2026)
- Total assets: ▲₹25,513 crore (US$2.6 billion) (2026)
- Total equity: ▲₹24,025 crore (US$2.5 billion) (2026)
- Number of employees: 87,950 (2026)
- Parent: Larsen & Toubro
- Website: www.ltm.com
- Footnotes; Financials as of 31 March 2026.

LTM Limited (formerly LTIMindtree Limited) is an Indian multinational information technology services and consulting company based in Mumbai. A subsidiary of Larsen & Toubro, the company was incorporated in 1996 and employs more than 87,950 people.

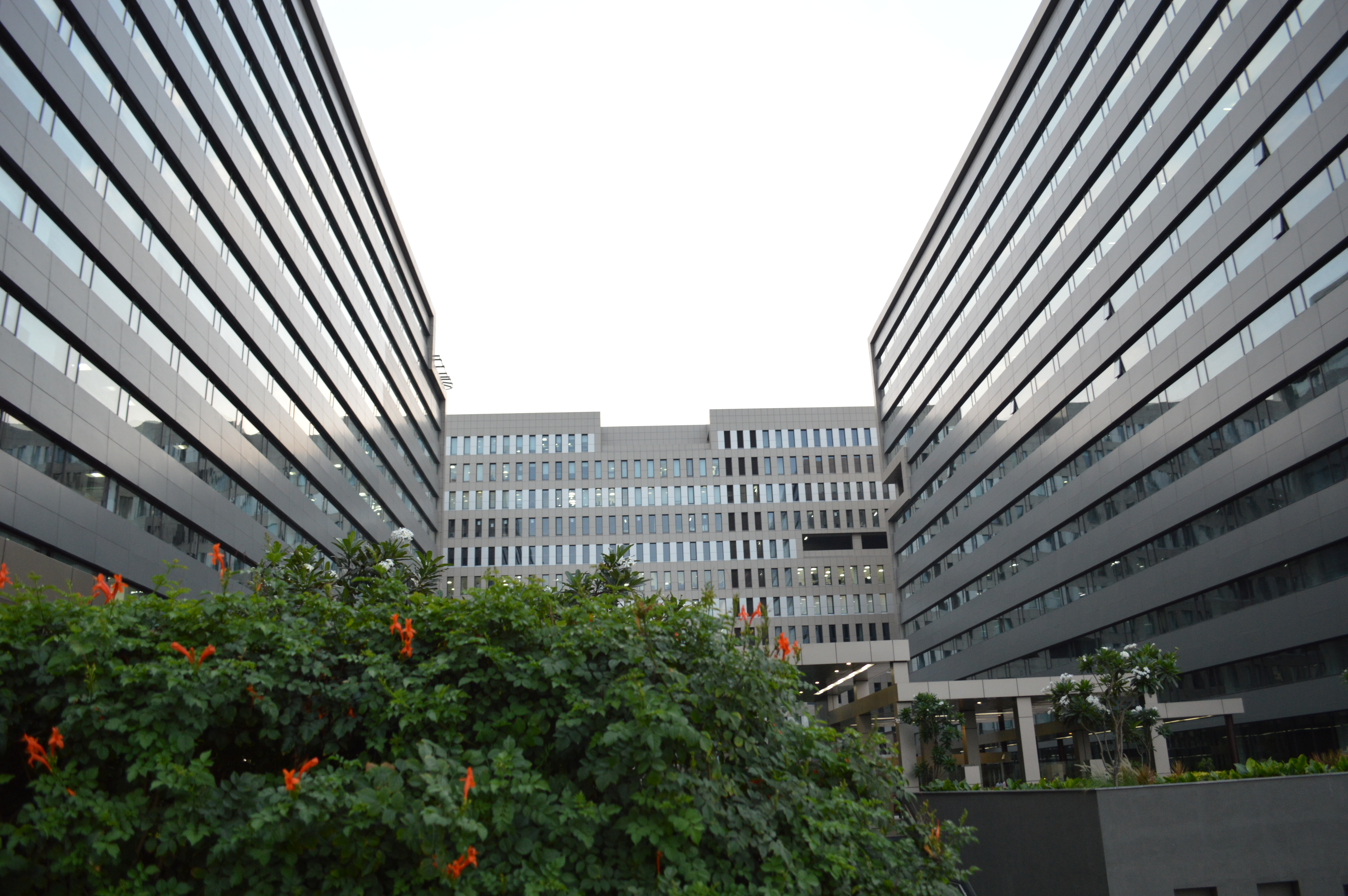
Ramanujan IT City, Chennai

Global Headquarters Powai, Mumbai

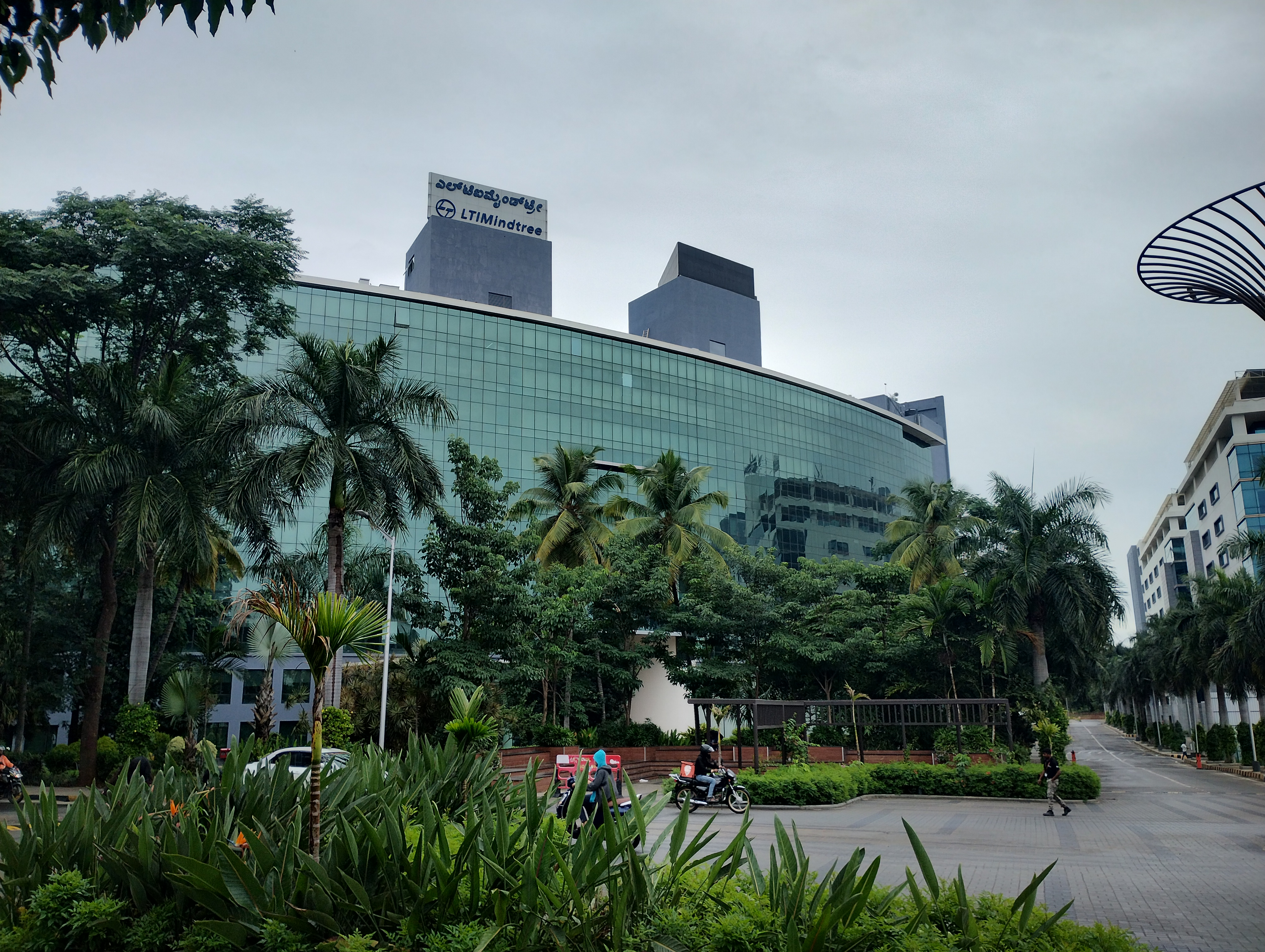
Sattva Global City, Bangalore

LTM campuses

== History ==
The company was founded as L&T Information Technology Ltd in December 1996 as a subsidiary of Larsen & Toubro. During 2001–2002, the company's name was changed from L&T Information Technology Ltd. to L&T Infotech Ltd., and in the same year, the company achieved the assessed level of the Software Engineering Institute's (SEI) Maturity Level 5.

Between 2009 and 2012, parent Larsen & Toubro sought to scale up L&T Infotech by making a series of acquisition attempts, for Satyam Computer Services, Patni Computer Systems and Hexaware Technologies, all three of which proved to be unsuccessful.

In 2013–14, L&T Infotech's engineering services segment was acquired by parent Larsen & Toubro's newly created technology and engineering services subsidiary called L&T Technology Services.

In July 2016, L&T Infotech went public via an initial public offering (IPO) of ₹1,243 crore (US$184.98 million).

Between 2016 and 2017, L&T Infotech had contracts with the Income Tax Department and Central Board of Direct Taxes to detect income tax evasion using profiling, data models and social media analytics.

The company rebranded itself as 'LTI' with a tag line of 'Let's Solve' in May 2017.

=== Mindtree merger ===
In June 2019, Larsen & Toubro completed its hostile takeover of Bengaluru-based company Mindtree, despite opposition from the latter's promoters.

In May 2022, it was announced that Mindtree, which was then a different IT services subsidiary of Larsen & Toubro, will be merged into LTI, and the company will be renamed as LTIMindtree. Larsen & Toubro Group chairman A. M. Naik commented that there was not much overlap between the two companies in terms of industries and clientele; LTI had a plurality in BFSI industry and was active in the oil and gas sector, while Mindtree had a plurality in technology, media and telecommunications (TMT) with a presence in travel and hospitality.

The merger was completed in November 2022. Subsequent to Merger, company changed name to LTIMindtree, becoming India's fifth largest provider of IT services by market capitalization and sixth largest by revenue. Shares of Mindtree were delisted and shareholders were allotted 73 shares of LTI for every 100 shares of Mindtree held. The parent company, Larsen & Toubro, held a 68.73% stake in the merged entity.

In February 2026, LTIMindtree Limited announced that it would change its name to LTM Limited. "Outcreate" is the central brand call-to-action and strategic vision introduced by LTM following its rebrand. It represents a shift toward combining business creativity, human insight, and agentic AI systems to shape future enterprise outcomes rather than just relying on past practices.

A technology campus, Ananda Niketan, of LTIMindtree (LTM Limited) of the Larsen & Toubro Group was inaugurated on 27 August 2026 by the state's chief minister, Suvendu Adhikari, at the Bengal Silicon Valley Tech Hub in Kolkata in the presence of the chairman of L&T, S. N. Subrahmanyan. The campus of two buildings is spread across 18 acres (800,000 sq ft) and can accommodate up to 5,800 engineers and professionals. Meanwhile, an additional 10 acres (440,000 sq ft) was also allocated to the firm. L&T also received approval to construct four more towers at the site while L&T Realty would take up the project soon. The campus would serve as an integrated centre for learning and innovation to supporting clients across banking and financial services, travel, manufacturing, energy and technology while it would focus on artificial intelligence, data, cloud and digital engineering.

== Acquisitions ==
Company acquired	Country	Date	Business	Reference
Citigroup Fund Services Canada	Canada	February 2011	IT consulting	
Information Systems Resource Centre (ISRC)	India	October 2014	IT services	
AugmentIQ Data Sciences	India	October 2016	Big data, data analytics	
Syncordis	Luxembourg	November 2017	Core banking technology	
Ruletronics	India	January 2019	Business process management	
Nielsen+Partner	Germany	February 2019	IT consulting	
Lymbyc	India	July 2019	AI, machine learning	
Powerupcloud Technologies	India	October 2019	Cloud computing	
Cuelogic Technologies	India	July 2021	Digital engineering	
Mindtree	India	May 2022	IT services	

== Logo ==
History of logo

Original logo used till 2007

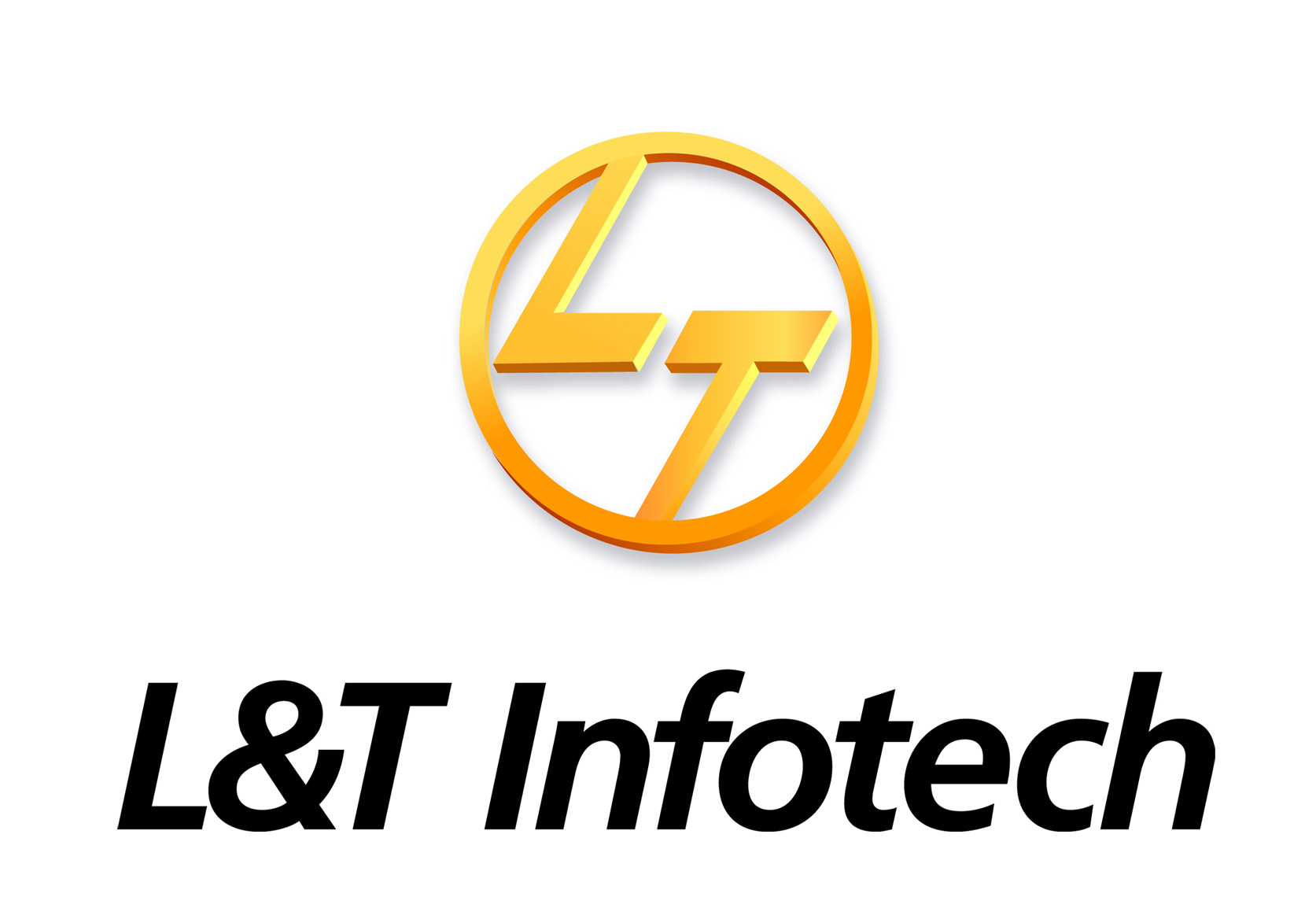
Logo used from 2007 to 2017

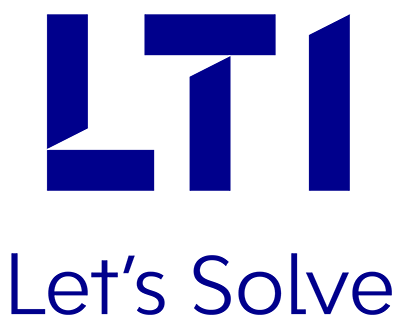
Logo used from 2017 to 2022

Logo used from 2022 to 2026

Logo used from 2026 onwards

== See also ==
- L&T Technology Services
