= L&T Technology Services =

Indian technology company

- Formerly: L&T Integrated Engineering Services
- Type: Public
- Traded as: NSE: LTTS; BSE: 540115
- ISIN: INE010V01017
- Founded: 14 June 2012; 14 years ago
- Headquarters: L&T Knowledge City, Vadodara, Gujarat, India
- Area served: Worldwide
- Key people: Amit Chadha (CEO & MD); Keshab Panda (Non-Ex Director); Rajeev Gupta (CFO)
- Services: Engineering design Research and development Product lifecycle management
- Revenue: ▲₹10,670 crore (US$1.1 billion) (FY25)
- Operating income: ▲₹1,803 crore (US$190 million) (FY24)
- Net income: ▲₹1,266 crore (US$130 million) (FY25)
- Total assets: ▲₹8,862 crore (US$920 million) (FY25)
- Total equity: ▲₹5,748 crore (US$600 million) (FY25)
- Number of employees: 23,812 (March 2024)
- Parent: Larsen & Toubro
- Website: www.ltts.com

L&T Technology Services (LTTS) is an Indian multinational technology company that provides engineering research and development (ER&D) services, headquartered in Vadodara. The company's business interests include automotive engineering, embedded system and semiconductor engineering, industrial internet of things, manufacturing plant engineering, and medical engineering.

LTTS is a subsidiary of the conglomerate Larsen & Toubro (L&T), and listed on both NSE and BSE. The company has offices across India, United States, Europe, and Asia.

== History ==
L&T Technology Services (LTTS) was founded in 2006 as L&T Integrated Engineering Services. In its first year, the company generated $70 million in revenue. Initially, it only operated as the engineering arm of Larsen & Toubro and in 2013, as a result of L&T's strategy, the parent company was split into "nine verticals and six subsidiaries", of which this was one. It began to expand its engineering services as a developer of corporate software under a new brand name L&T Technology Services (LTTS).

In September 2016, LTTS had its initial public offering in the National Stock Exchange, making it the second L&T subsidiary to go public. A. M. Naik, the current group chairman of the parent company, remained chairman of the subsidiary until his retirement in October 2017. Keshab Panda was named as the CEO and managing director and S.N.Subrahmanyan as vice chairman of the company.

In 2016, LTTS developed a set of personal safety gear that is based on cloud-enabled technologies. The system includes a set of "helmets, gloves, jackets and shoes that have sensors capturing [the wearers] performance, and sending it to a centralized database on the cloud."

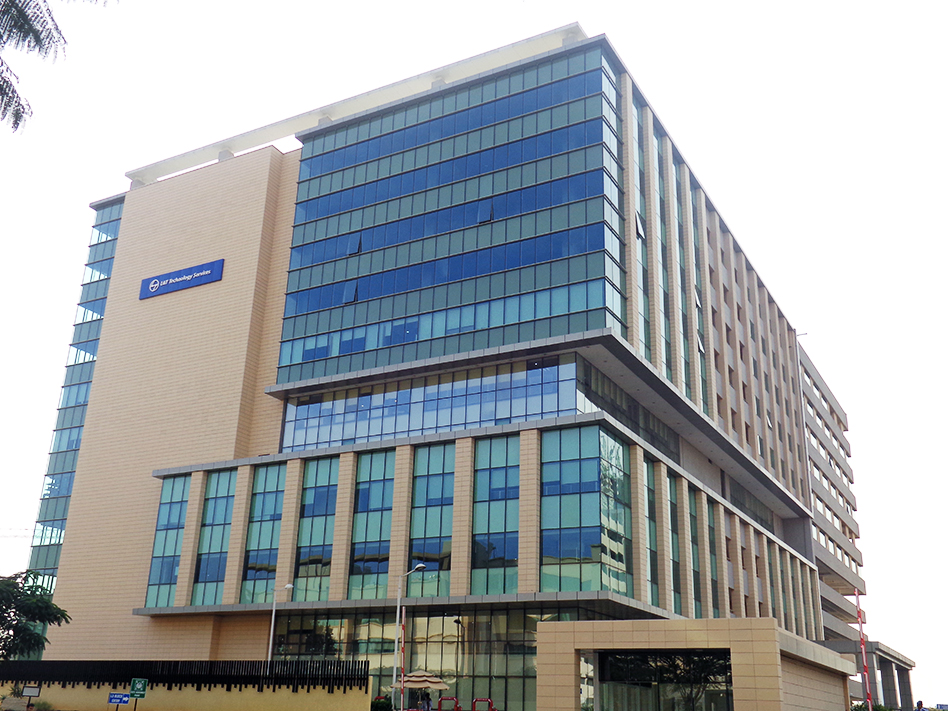
L&T Technology Services office at Manyata Tech Park, Bangalore.

In March 2017, it opened a center of excellence in Munich, Germany. In June 2017, LTTS completed the acquisition of the Esencia, a San Jose, California-based engineering firm involved in development of "wireless connectivity solutions, perceptual computing, Internet of Things and advanced silicon products" for $27 million. In July, the company was upgraded to Group A of the Bombay Stock Exchange.

In May 2022, the company opened an engineering, research and development (ER&D) centre in Krakow, Poland. In June 2022, LTTS set up an engineering design centre in Toulouse, France.

In January 2023, LTTS announced that it would acquire parent L&T's "Smart World & Communication" business segment, which has interests in communication networks, cybersecurity and smart spaces, for ₹800 crore.

In April 2024, L&T Technology Services partnered with Forvia to forge a €45 million deal. In August 2024, LTTS signed a contract to resell the Thales Sentinel platform, a software monetization platform developed by French defence and aerospace company, Thales Group, to its customers. In November 2024, L&T Technology Services announced the acquisition of Intelliswift for $110 million.

== See also ==
- LTIMindtree
- KPIT Technologies
