= Preetu Nair =

Indian journalist (born 1976)

- Born: 1976 (age 49–50)
- Occupation: Journalist
- Employer: The Times of India

Preetu Nair (born 1976) is an Indian journalist based in Goa, India. She is active in the cyberspace and involved with e-ventures involving Goa, developmental concerns and issues dealing with women and children. She writes mostly on HIV/AIDS, tuberculosis, women, and issues regarding children in India.

== Education ==
Nair's schooling was in Gujarati medium in a small town of Anand in Gujarat. She received a B.A. degree from Sardar Patel University, Vallabh Vidyanagar, Anand, Gujarat (Gold Medalist), and M.A. (English Literature) degree, Gold Medalist from Sardar Patel University.

== Career ==
Nair has been a full-time journalist since 2000. From May 2000 to May 2001, she was a trainee reporter for The Times of India. From 2001 onward, she became a freelancer, and has written for The Navhind Times on news related to Goa. She resigned as a senior reporter for Gomantak Times, Goa (Sakaal Group of Publications) and joined the Times of India as principal correspondent.

Nair and Peter De Souza, her colleague in Gomantak Times, Goa were awarded the UNDP-TAHA-HDRN Media Award-2006 for exposing the modus operandi of the human traffickers explicitly and vividly underlining the nexus between these offenders, the police, and politicians.

These stories were all written while Sujay Gupta was the Editor of Gomantak Times. Naik left Gomantak Times to join Times of India after Derrick Almeida took over as the Executive Editor of Gomantak Times. She was selected as the Panos/Stop TB Media Fellow for the year 2007 to work on Tuberculosis related issues in Goa.

She also received the European Union - Thomson Foundation Media bursary for working on a story "Trafficked victims and HIV". Nair and De Souza were also the first journalists in Goa working in a local newspaper who exposed the powerful Russians and the Israelis purchasing land.

She has written articles on Goa, Goan books, media, environment, development.
