= S. N. Subrahmanyan =

Chairman of Larsen & Toubro

- Born: Sekharipuram Narayanan Subrahmanyan; 16 March 1960 (age 66); Chennai, India
- Education: London Business School, NIT Kurukshetra
- Occupation: Businessman
- Known for: Chairman & Managing Director of Larsen & Toubro
- Spouse: Meena Subrahmanyan
- Children: 2

Sekharipuram Narayanan Subrahmanyan (born 16 March 1960) is an Indian businessman who is the chairman and managing director of Larsen & Toubro, an Indian multinational conglomerate. He took over as the MD from A. M. Naik on 1 July 2017. He is vice chairman on the Boards of LTIMindtree and L&T Technology Services, chairman of L&T Metro Rail (Hyderabad) Limited and chairperson of L&T Finance.

In February 2021, he was appointed chairman of the National Safety Council (NSC) for a tenure of three years by the Ministry of Labour and Employment. He is also one of nine founding members of Climate Finance Leadership Initiative (CFLI) India.

He was named the Best CEO in the Infrastructure Sector at the Fortune India Best CEOs 2022 awards and won the same category at the BT PwC India's Best CEOs ranking in 2022.

== Early life ==
Born in Chennai, Tamil Nadu Subrahmanyan's father, S S Narayanan was a General Manager with the Indian Railways. He studied at Vidya Mandir Senior Secondary School, Mylapore in Chennai and completed his graduation in Civil Engineering from Regional Engineering College Kurukshetra (Presently National Institute of Technology, Kurukshetra in 1982.

He pursued a Masters in Business Administration from Symbiosis Institute of Business Management, Pune followed by an Executive Management Programme from the London Business School.

== Career ==
S. N. Subrahmanyan joined the ECC Division of Larsen & Toubro in 1984 and began working with leaders like Cheyur Ramaswamy Ramakrishnan (former Joint Managing Director, L&T), A Ramakrishna (former President & Deputy Managing Director, L&T) and K V Rangaswami (former President, ECC).

In July 2011, Subrahmanyan was appointed as full-time Director on the L&T Board and designated as Member of the Board and Senior Executive Vice President (Construction). In October 2015, he was designated Deputy Managing Director & President, L&T. In 2017, he was promoted to the role of Chief Executive Officer and Managing Director by the company's board of directors.

He took charge as Chairman and Managing Director of L&T from 1 October 2023. In 2026, Subrahmanyan won the "Urban Visionary -- Infrastructure" award at BT MindRush 2026. Under him, L&T has repositioned itself as a technology-driven conglomerate, expanding into AI, semiconductors, data centres, and defence electronics, while divesting non-core businesses like electrical/automation and construction equipment.

== Controversy ==
In January 2025, an undated video of Subrahmanyan’s New Year address sparked widespread controversy online. In the video, an employee is heard asking why L&T, one of India's largest conglomerates, requires employees to work on Saturdays. In response, Subrahmanyan expressed regret not being able to make employees work on Sundays, stating it would make him happier since he himself works on Sundays. He further questioned that what do employees do "sitting at home" and how long could spouses stare at each other, suggesting that employees should "Get to the office and start working" on Sundays instead. Subrahmanyan justified this stance by citing a conversation with a Chinese individual who claimed that China's 90-hour work weeks could enable them to surpass the United States. He subsequently endorsed a 90-hour workweek for employees, adding that such effort was necessary for achieving success. However, his statements were contradicted by a 2021 United Nations report, which highlighted the detrimental effects of excessive work hours on mental and physical health. Shortly after the video went viral, Meena Subrahmanyan, his wife, became the target of widespread trolling on social media due to her husband's remarks.

The remarks reignited concerns about toxic work environments in India, especially following the 2024 death of an Indian Chartered Accountant and death due to heart attack of another one attributed to work pressure. This controversy also brought attention to Subrahmanyan’s substantial remuneration in 2024, which amounted to ₹510,000,000 (approximately $6,000,000 in 2025), compared to L&T’s median employee salary of ₹955,000 (approximately $11,000 in 2025).

Prominent figures such as Gautam Adani, Harsh Goenka, Deepika Padukone, Anand Mahindra, Anupam Mittal and Cyrus Poonawalla expressed their disapproval of Subrahmanyan's remarks on social media. A spokesperson for L&T defended his statements, describing them as a call for collective dedication and effort to drive progress and achieve the shared vision of India, emphasizing that extraordinary outcomes demand extraordinary effort. Subrahmanyan's remarks also found support in some quarters, with former NITI Aayog CEO and India's G20 Sherpa Amitabh Kant endorsing 80–90 hour work weeks as necessary for India to become a $30 trillion economy, while journalist Shekhar Gupta defended Subrahmanyan, arguing that entrepreneurs and job creators should not be criticised for urging harder work.

In August 2025, Subrahmanyam alleged his remarks were made casually but recorded against rules, and he spoke out of frustration as L&T's work progress was poor at that time which led to high-profile clients questioning him.

== Awards and Recognition ==
- Ranked 8th in Power 100 list by Construction Week about influential faces of Middle East construction in 2023
- Best CEO in the Infrastructure Sector of the Fortune India Best CEOs 2022
- Best CEO in the Infrastructure & Engineering category of the BT-PwC India’s Best CEOs ranking 2022.
- Featured in the Top 50 Utilities Leaders In The GCC 2021
- Appointed as Chairman of National Safety Council by Labour Ministry
- Ranked 11 in the Construction Week magazine Power 100 Ranking for 2021
- CEO of the year(pvt) 2019 by CNBC – Awaaz
- Emergent Award at the CEO Awards 2019 for exemplary leadership.
- Ranked 13 in the Construction Week magazine Power 100 Ranking for 2019.
- Recognized with the IIM-JRD Tata Award by the Indian Institute of Metallurgy (IIM) in 2019 for his "service to the country through leadership in the industry, corporate governance and fulfilling societal responsibilities."
- ‘Contractor CEO of the Year’ at Qatar Contractors Forum & Awards function in 2014
- Ranked 36th in the ‘2014 Construction Week Power 100’
- Leading Engineering Personality award at ‘Glimpses of Engineering Personalities’ by the Institution of Engineers (India) in 2014
- Recognized as the ‘Infrastructure Person of the Year – 2012’ by Construction Week (CW) magazine.
