= Søren Kristian Toubro =

Danish businessman (1906–1982)

- Born: 27 February 1906; Denmark
- Died: 4 March 1982 (aged 76); Denmark
- Education: Technical University of Denmark
- Known for: Founder of Larsen & Toubro
- Children: 2

Søren Kristian Toubro (27 February 1906 – 4 March 1982) was a Danish engineer who co-founded the engineering firm Larsen & Toubro, an India-based conglomerate.

== Early days in India ==
Toubro began his career as a civil engineer. As an employee of F. L. Smidth & Co. of Copenhagen, he came to India in 1934 to erect and commission the equipment supplied to the Madukkarai Cement Works (near Coimbatore) and the Rohri Cement Factory (near the Sukkur Barrage in Sindh). Sometime after landing in India, he read a report in The Bombay Chronicle that quoted Mohandas K. Gandhi as saying: "(I am) not leading a movement to rid India of its white colonial masters in order to substitute them with brown ones." Toubro felt that such an India would "offer great opportunities to anyone with modern technological and management skills."

== Larsen & Toubro ==
In 1938, Toubro partnered with his former schoolmate Henning Holck-Larsen, a chemical engineer and a fellow F.L.Smidth's employee, to establish Larsen & Toubro. The idea of L&T was conceived during a holiday in Matheran, a hill station near Mumbai. Holck-Larsen was a risk-taker while Toubro was more conservative. Larsen & Toubro saw opportunities in India at a time, when few Europeans had realised the country's potential for industrial growth.

The first office of L&T, located in Mumbai, was so small that only one of them could use it a time. Initially, L&T represented Danish dairy equipment manufacturers. However, the Danish imports were restricted during World War II, forcing L&T to start a small workshop that provided servicing and undertook small jobs. The imports stopped after the German invasion of Denmark, forcing L&T to start manufacturing dairy equipment indigenously, a move that was successful.

Seeing opportunity in ship repair during wartime, Larsen and Toubro formed a new company called Hilda Ltd. Around this time, L&T also started two repair and fabrication shops. The internment of German engineers who were supposed to build a soda ash plant for the Tatas provided L&T another new opportunity.

In 1944, Larsen and Toubro established Engineering Construction & Contracts (ECC). L&T started collaborating with international companies around this time. In 1945, L&T signed an agreement with the Caterpillar Tractor Company of the United States for marketing earthmoving equipment. L&T also started representing British manufacturers of equipment used to manufacture a variety of products including biscuits, glass, hydrogenated oils and soaps.

At the end of World War II, the war-surplus Caterpillar equipment were available in bulk at low prices. However, L&T lacked the money to purchase them. Therefore, Larsen and Toubro decided to raise additional equity capital, and as a result, Larsen & Toubro Private Limited was established on 7 February 1946. After India gained independence in 1947, L&T set up offices in Calcutta, Madras, and New Delhi. In 1948, L&T acquired 55 acres (22 ha) of undeveloped land in the Powai suburb of Mumbai.

Larsen and Toubro gradually transformed L&T into a large business house with diverse interests. A 2006 article in The Hindu described Toubro as follows:

A workaholic, he expected the same of others. A hard taskmaster with a schoolmasterly attitude to training he may have been, but the young he mentored still remember the lessons he taught: that no effort was too great to ensure customer satisfaction, that there must be attention to detail in the quest for perfection, and that there must be pride in whatever was being done.

Soren K. Toubro served as the director of L&T from 1946 to 1981, and retired from active management in 1962–63. He continued to serve on the L&T and ECC board of directors till 1981.

== Last years ==
After spending nearly five decades in India, Toubro retired to Denmark in 1981, and died there the following year. Toubro had a large house and estate in Kodaikanal, where his wife spent her last days.

The Toubro Training Centre, located in the Manapakkam campus of L&T's ECC division, is named after him. The Toubro Construction Technology Centre, is also named after him, and was inaugurated by his son Ole K. Toubro in 2006.
