= Anjan Lahiri =

American business executive

- Occupation: CEO Birlasoft
- Children: 2

Anjan Lahiri was the CEO of Birlasoft, the global IT services company of the CK Birla Group.

== Education ==
Lahiri is an alumnus of the Birla Institute of Technology, Mesra, where he earned a Bachelor of Technology degree in electrical and electronics engineering. Birla Institute of Technology, Mesra, is part of the CK Birla Group. He also holds an MBA from the University of Florida, Gainesville, USA.

== Career ==
He began his career with Wipro Infotech in 1987 as part of the sales team and then moved on to start Cambridge Technology Partners' internet services consulting practice in the US. In 1999, Lahiri along with ex-colleagues from Wipro and Cambridge Technology Partners set up Mindtree. Lahiri set up Mindtree's offices in New Jersey, San Jose and London, and expanded the company's operations in the US and Europe. He returned to India in 2008, as the head of IT Services at Mindtree.

He moved on from Mindtree in 2013, especially in the field of technology. Until recently, he was the CEO of the Bangalore-based Sasken Communication Technologies where he focused on turning around the loss-making company.

== Personal life ==
He is a member of the Young Presidents Organization, a global peer network of chief executives and business leaders. He is married and has a daughter and a son. His father was an officer, in the Indian Army's Gorkha regiment.
