= Henning Holck-Larsen =

Danish businessman and engineer (1907–2003)

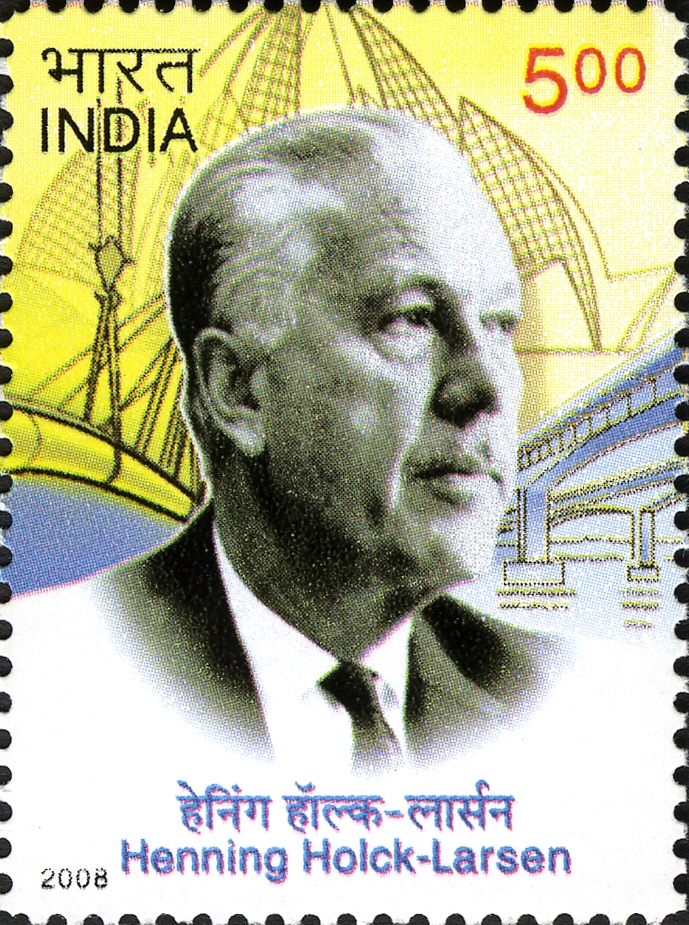
- Holck-Larsen on a 2008 stamp of India
- Born: 4 July 1907; Frederiksberg, Denmark
- Died: 27 July 2003 (aged 96); Mumbai, India
- Known for: Founder of Larsen & Toubro

Henning Holck-Larsen (4 July 1907 – 27 July 2003) was a Danish-born Indian engineer who co-founded the engineering firm Larsen & Toubro (L&T) along with Søren Kristian Toubro (27 February 1906 – 4 March 1982).

== Early life and career ==
Holck-Larsen was educated at the University of Copenhagen (and what is now the Technical University of Denmark). He came to India in 1937 as a chemical engineer working for F. L. Smidth & Co. of Copenhagen. Partnering with his former schoolmate and fellow employee Søren Kristian Toubro, he set up Larsen & Toubro in 1938. The idea of L&T was conceived during a holiday in Matheran, a hill station near Mumbai. Holck-Larsen was a risk-taker while Toubro was more conservative. Holck-Larsen and Toubro saw opportunities in India at a time when few Europeans had realised the country's potential for industrial growth.

The first office of L&T, located in Mumbai, was so small that only one of them could use it at a time. Initially, L&T represented Danish dairy equipment manufacturers. However, the Danish imports were restricted during the World War II, forcing L&T to start a small workshop that provided servicing and undertook small jobs. The imports stopped after the German invasion of Denmark, forcing L&T to start manufacturing dairy equipment indigenously, a move that was successful.

Seeing opportunity in ship repair during wartime, Holck-Larsen and Toubro formed a new company called Hilda Ltd. Around this time, L&T also started two repair and fabrication shops. The wartime internment of German engineers who were supposed to build a soda ash plant for the Tatas provided L&T another new opportunity.

In 1944, Holck-Larsen and Toubro established Engineering Construction & Contracts (ECC). L&T started collaborating with international companies around this time. In 1945, it signed an agreement with the Caterpillar Tractor Company of USA for marketing earthmoving equipment. L&T also started representing British manufacturers of equipment used to manufacture a variety of products including biscuits, glass, hydrogenated oils and soaps. At the end of World War II, the war-surplus Caterpillar equipment was available in bulk at low prices. However, L&T lacked the money to purchase them. Therefore, Holck-Larsen and Toubro decided to raise additional equity capital, and as a result, Larsen & Toubro Private Limited was established on 7 February 1946. After India gained independence in 1947, L&T set up offices in Calcutta, Madras and New Delhi.

He naturalised as a citizen of the Republic of India in 1950, giving up his Danish citizenship.

Holck-Larsen and Toubro gradually transformed L&T into a large business house with diverse interests, and went on to become one of the most successful Indian companies.

He later wedded his wife Karen at the Church of St Andrew and St Columba. After retirement, Holck-Larsen served as the chairman emeritus of the company. He used to call India his "adopted homeland" and divided his time between Denmark and India. He died in 2003 at the Breach Candy hospital, Mumbai. His daughter, Jeannette Findlay, and two grandchildren, Lucy and Toby, live in London

== Awards and recognitions ==
- Ramon Magsaysay Award for International Understanding (1976)
- Knighthood from Queen Margrethe II of Denmark (1977)
- Sir Jehangir Ghandy Medal for Industrial Peace (1980)
- Chemtech Foundation's Chemical Industry Stalwart Award (2000)
- Bombay Management Association's Lifetime Achievement Award (2001)
- Citation from the Indo-European Union Business Summit for promoting business beyond boundaries (2002)
- Padma Bhushan (2002) for contribution to Indian industry.
- India Post issued a commemorative postage stamp of ₹5.00 on 12 June 2008
