= Krishnakumar Natarajan =

Indian Venture Capitalist

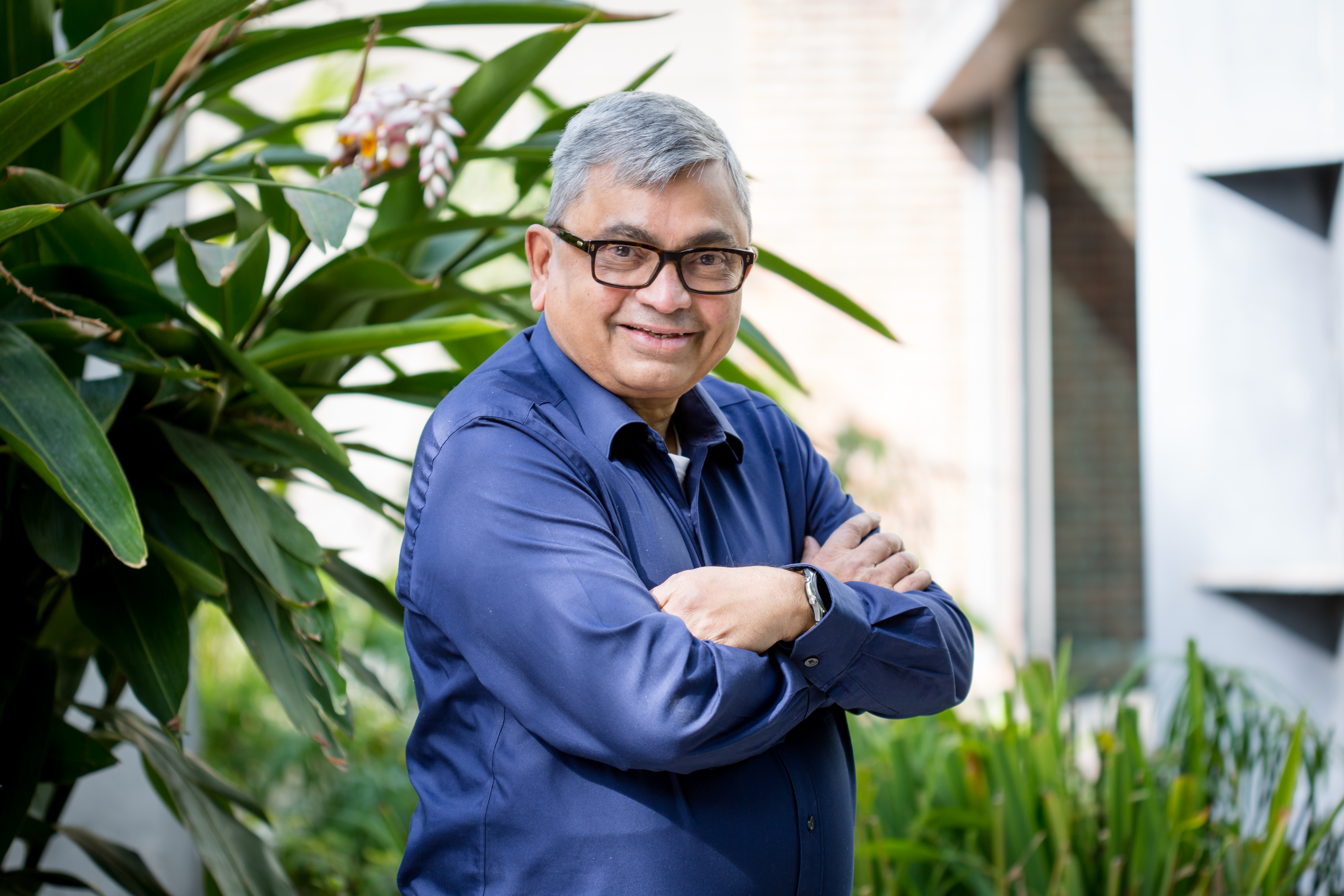
- Photo of Krishnakumar Natarajan
- Other name: KK
- Education: XLRI, Jamshedpur, India, College of Engineering, Guindy
- Occupations: Managing Partner, Mela Ventures; Ex-CEO & Executive Chairman, Mindtree; Ex-Chairman, NASSCOM
- Spouse: Akila Krishnakumar
- Website: https://melaventures.in/team/krishnakumar-natarajan-kk/

Krishnakumar Natarajan (KK) is a co-founder and former CEO and Executive Chairperson of Indian IT company Mindtree. He is currently a Managing Partner at Mela Ventures, an early stage venture capital fund in India. He was the Chairman of NASSCOM for the year 2013–2014. He was earlier a senior executive with Wipro and is an alumnus of XLRI.

== Early life and education ==
KK graduated in 1979 with a degree in Mechanical Engineering from the College of Engineering, Guindy, Chennai, India. In 1981, he completed his Master's in Business Administration (MBA) majoring in marketing and systems from XLRI, Jamshedpur, India.

== Career ==
KK started his career in Wipro and held various key positions there from 1982 to 1999. During this time, he started and grew the Ecommerce division as the Chief Executive of the Ecommerce and Financial Solutions Division from 1996 to 1999. He served as Group Vice President of Human Resources and also as Chief Marketing Officer for Wipro's IT business.

In August 1999, KK along with nine other businessmen in IT, co-founded Mindtree. In the early years of Mindtree, KK was instrumental in setting up the U.S. operations and played a key role in building the organization. He then drove Mindtree's expansion into Europe, Asia Pacific and the Middle East, transforming Mindtree's IT services business. He served as the CEO from August 1999 until April 2016 and as the Executive Chairman from April 2016 until Mindtree was acquired by LTI in a hostile takeover in 2019. Subsequently KK, along several others, resigned from the company.

In August 2019, Krishnakumar along with his Mindtree Colleague N.S. Parthasarathy founded Mela Ventures, an early stage Venture Capital firm focused on investing in DeepTech, ClimateTech, and Enterprise Technology. Some of their investments include GalaxEye (Earth observation), Mindgrove (SoC design), Indra (Water treatment), and Vunet (Platform observability).

KK is an Ex-Chairman of NASSCOM and chaired the ‘emerging companies’ forum. In this capacity, he worked towards bringing together large and emerging companies to make the Indian IT industry a globally competitive ecosystem.

KK is an active member of several professional industry organizations, such as the Manufacturer's Association for Information Technology (MAIT) and the Confederation of Indian Industry (CII).

== Awards and recognition ==
KK was ranked number 28 on the 50 highest rated CEOs list published by Glassdoor, 2013.

== Personal life and family ==
KK is married to Akila Krishnakumar. He has two sons.
