= Vallabh Vidyanagar =

Vallabh Vidyanagar Anand
- City
- Location within Gujarat Location within India
- Coordinates: 22.56°N 72.95°E
- Country: India
- State: Gujarat
- District: Anand

Government
  - Type: Municipal Corporation
  - Body: karamsad Anand Municipal Corporation

Population (2011)
  - Total: 23,783

Languages
  - Official: Gujarati
- Time zone: UTC+5:30 (IST)
- PIN: 388120
- Vehicle registration: GJ

Vallabh Vidyanagar, also known as V.V.Nagar, is a town and a Anand Municipal Corporation in Anand district in the Indian state of Gujarat. It is located between Ahmedabad and Vadodara, 6 km (3.7 mi) from the town of Anand. V.V.Nagar is renowned as an educational hub of Gujarat and is home to the prestigious Sardar Patel University.

== History ==
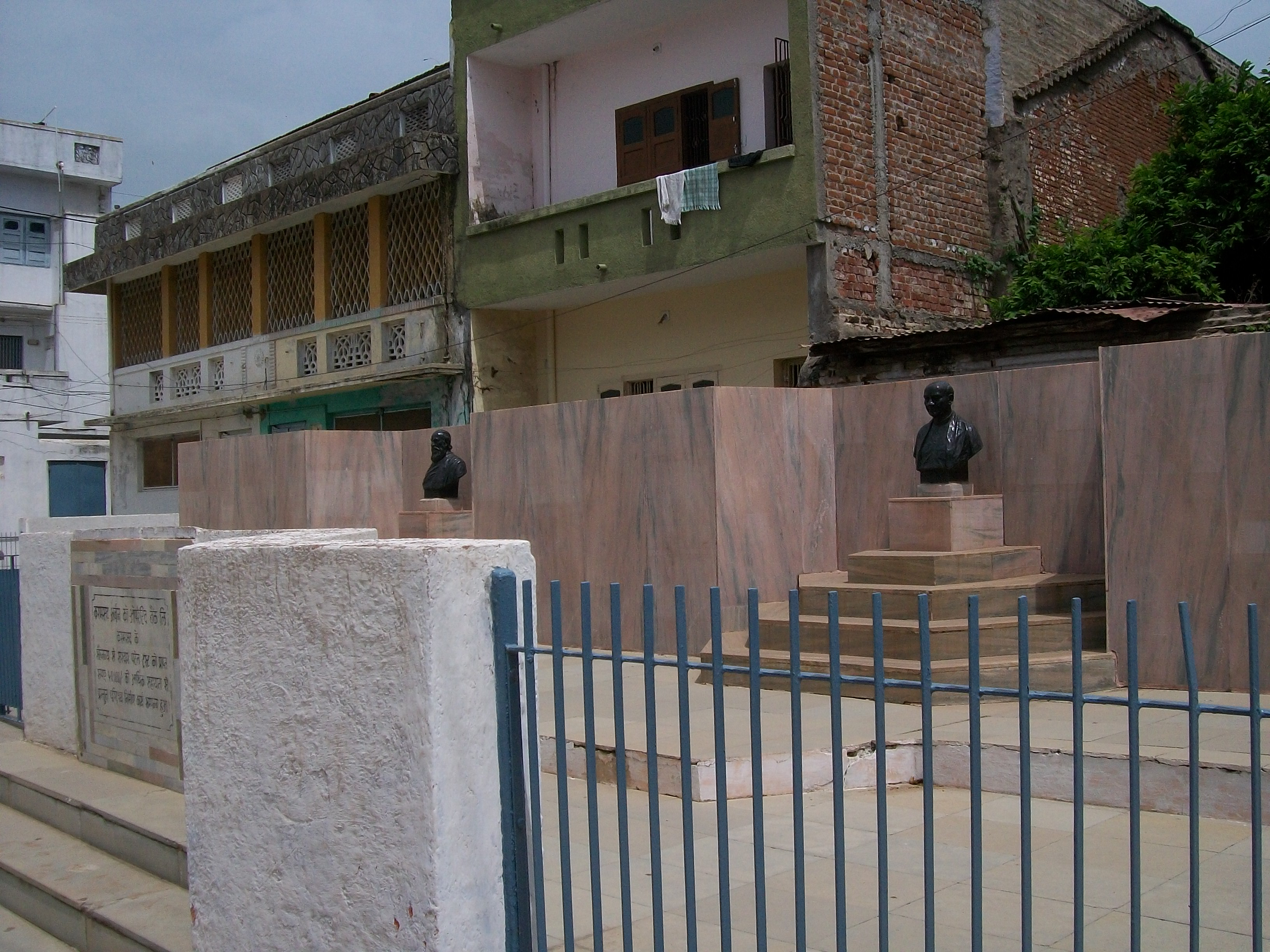
The home of Sardar Vallabhbhai Patel, situated in the VVNagar

With the establishment of Charutar Vidya Mandal and Sardar Patel University, the town was founded by Shri Bhaikaka and Shri Bhikhabhai Saheb of Karamsad with the blessings of Sardar Vallabhbhai Patel, a leader of the Indian Independence movement and the first home minister of India. The reason of foundation of the University and the town was to spread the Education in the Rural Areas of Gujarat. Both the town and the Sardar Patel University (SPU) are named in honor of Sardar Vallabhbhai Patel. The foundation stone of the town was laid by Prime Minister Jawaharlal Nehru on 13 February 1949. The town is also known as V.V. Nagar. SP University is listed in Top 50 universities in India.

Initially developed as an educational township, as the name suggests Vidya means Knowledge and Nagar means Town in Gujarati.

== Education and research ==
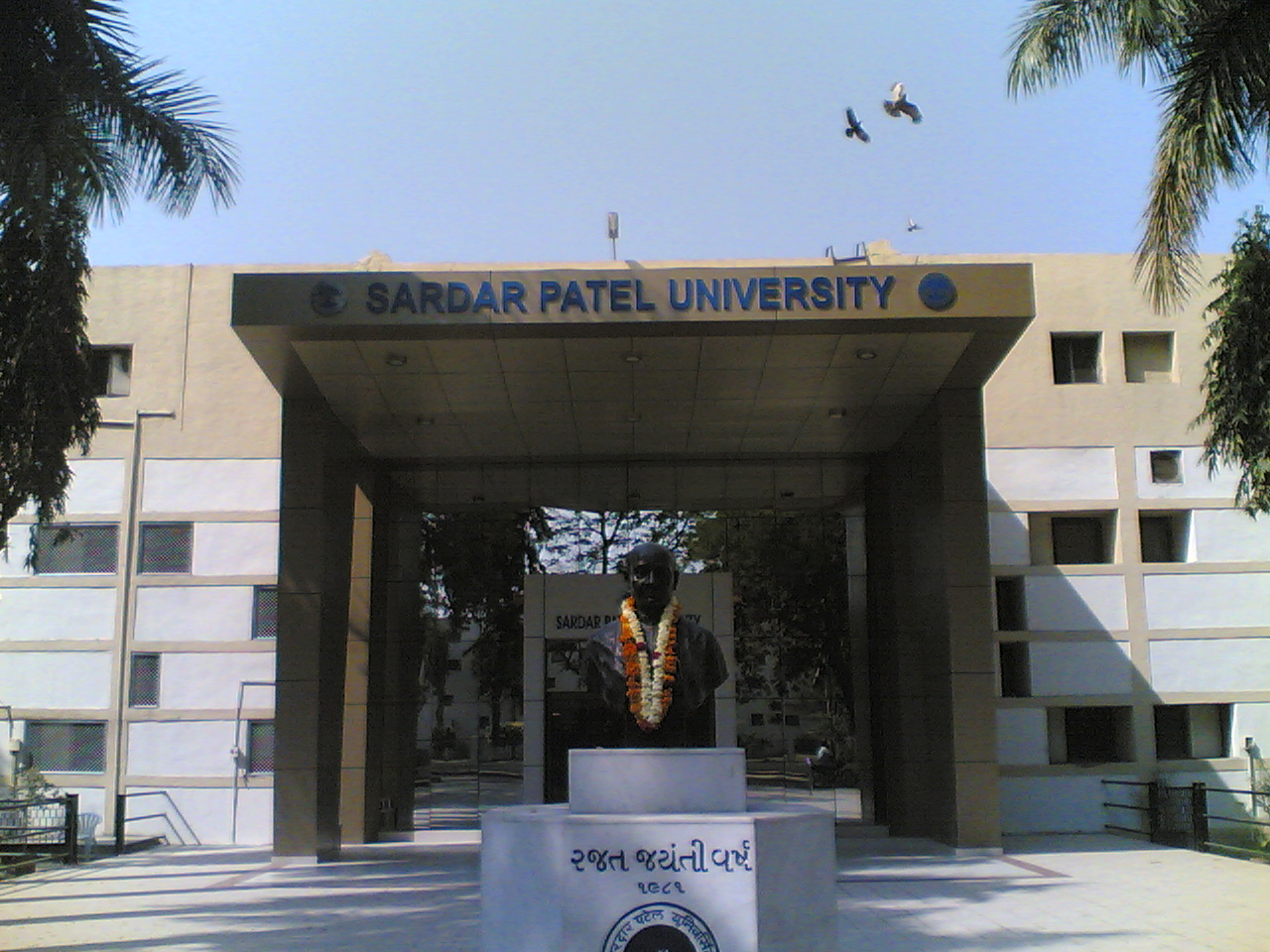
Sardar Patel University administrative building

Besides 24 university postgraduate departments, Vallabh Vidyanagar has many charitable trusts running colleges, affiliated to the Sardar Patel University. The oldest of these is CVM (Charutar Vidya Mandal). With the new dimension of disciplines emerging, CVM expanded to the New Vallabh Vidyanagar. The university has been the strongest candidate for becoming the only Central University in Gujarat. In fact, many departments boast to be on the national and international map in their subjects. The university was the first in Gujarat to volunteer for accreditation by NAAC (National Assessment and Accreditation Council) and, in 2001, SPU was rated four star by NAAC. The university has attracted a significant number of foreigners to enroll in programmes including BBA, BCA, MCA, MBA, M-EB, Engg, Medical, M.Sc., Master of Industrial Hygiene & Safety Ph.D., etc.

AERC (Agro-Economic Research Centre) Vallabh Vidyanagar is a research centre to carry out research in Gujarat and Rajasthan states of India. It was established in July 1961 at the Sardar Patel University (SPU), Vallabh Vidyanagar by the Directorate of Economics and Statistics (DES), Ministry of Agriculture (MOA), Government of India (GOI), New Delhi. Late Shri H.M. Patel (ICS retd.) played a key role in establishing such an Institute at Vallabh Vidyanagar. AERC, since 1970, has organized and worked on the scheme to Study Cost of Cultivation of Principal Crops in Gujarat in collaboration with the Department of Economics of S P University. D.C Patel school of architecture APIED, is design institute more than 35 years old holds a good position among design colleges of Gujarat. Madhuben and Bhanubhai Patel Institute of Engineering is an engineering college in Vallabh Vidyanagar.

== Specialities ==
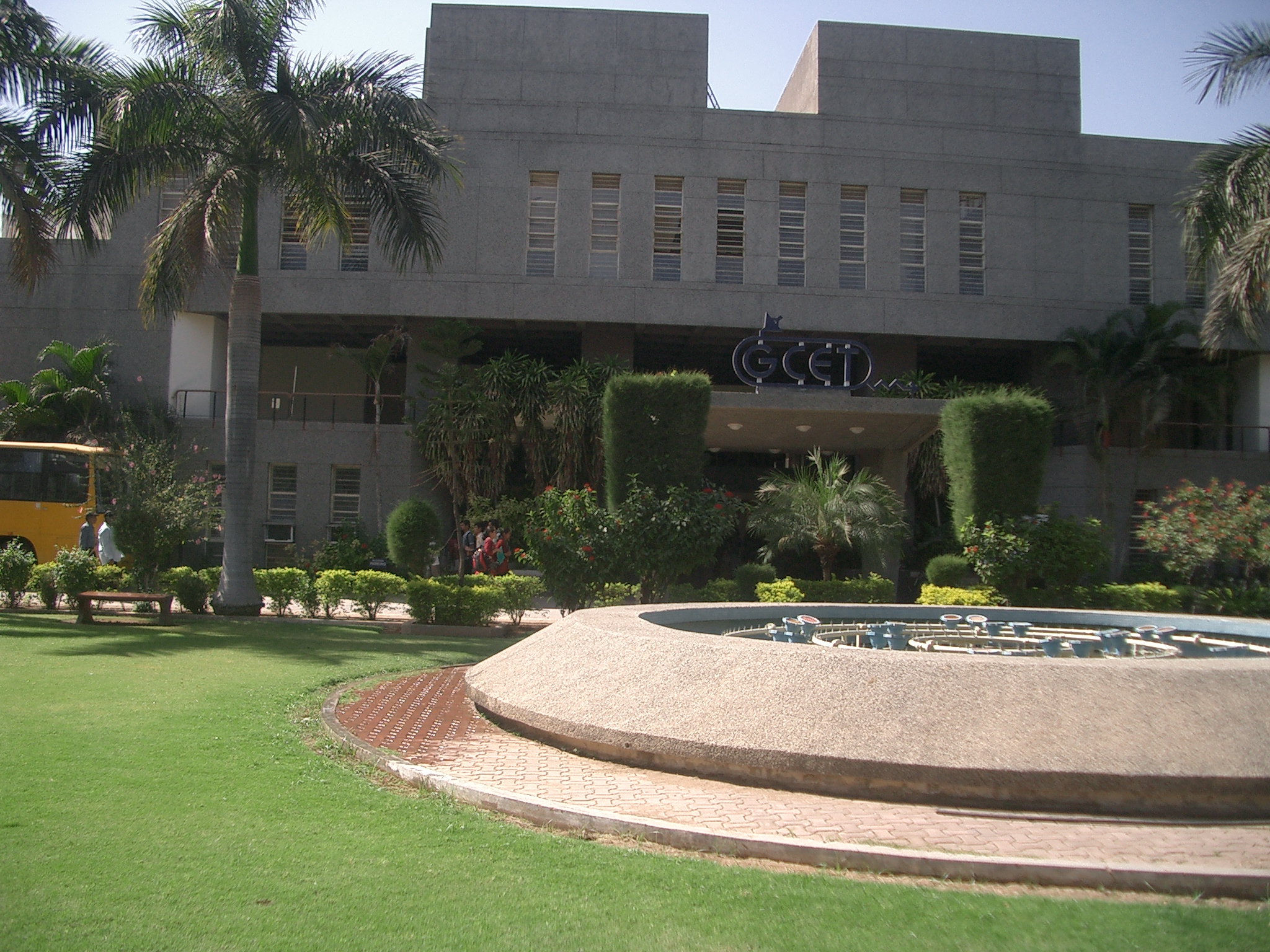
GCET Entrance

Some specialities of Vallabh Vidyanagar are:

- A university named after Sardar Vallabhbhai Patel, the first Home Minister of India.
- A research institute Sardar Patel Renewable Energy Research Institute (SPRERI).
- A Regional Library in Mathematics catering to the needs of the Western Region of India set up by the NBHM (National Board for Higher Mathematics), Department of Atomic Energy, Government of India.
- Charutar Vidya Mandal that had a former Finance Minister, late Shri H.M. Patel, as its president. Shri Bhailalbhai C Patel who was awarded an Order of British Empire (OBE) served as its Secretary in the 1960s.
- The town that had a municipality president who would once become a Finance Minister.
- A university that has an FM radio station (there were only two such universities in India as of September 2005).
- The university that is covered under the Edusat, a UGC Scheme of Nationwide Live Lectures using a satellite.
- Has the oldest engineering college, Birla Vishwakarma Mahavidyalaya. This was inaugurated by Lord Mountbatten of Burma.
- Vidyanagar Nature Club now known as Voluntary Nature Conservancy, working since 1988 for environment education, awareness and protection, a leading NGO in Anand district that is registered Public Charitable Trust, located in Vallabh Vidyanagar and is responsible for well-protected trees and its pollution-free atmosphere. VNC group on Facebook has more than 22,000 members which is perhaps most in category of any Indian Environmental NGO.
- V V Nagar has more than 80 species of trees planted on roadside; it has perhaps highest numbers of trees in the state of Gujarat in such a small area.
- Town has the largest colony (habitat) of rose-ringed parakeet (સુડા); last count was in 2003-4 was of more than 63,000 parakeets.
- V V Nagar is home to renowned photographer Sunil Adesara, in 1997 his photo exhibition "the transcendence" was done at national centre for performing arts (NCPA) Mumbai and again in 1999 at Indira Gandhi national centre for arts (IGNCA) New Delhi. Sunil Adesara has been awarded in 1992 by 'UNESCO' Japan an animal in daily life, in 1999 by "Nikon landscape photo contest", Mumbai, in 2003 by humanity awards china on cultural heritage, in 1990, by WHO Geneva "life for all".
- Vidyanagar Alumni Association USA is representing ardent supporters of V V Nagar, settled in USA, are striving to stay connected with its hometown which has played major role in their present-day prosperity.
- A spiritual (Swaminarayan) institution for women is located in Vallabh Vidyanagar named Gunatit Jyot. The Gunatit Jyot institution is well known for the emancipation of women and the women lead their lives with dedication to Swaminarayan.

== Climate ==
Climate data for Vallabh Vidyanagar (1991–2020, extremes 1963–2012)
Month	Jan	Feb	Mar	Apr	May	Jun	Jul	Aug	Sep	Oct	Nov	Dec	Year
Record high °C (°F)	34.7 (94.5)	37.9 (100.2)	42.5 (108.5)	44.6 (112.3)	47.5 (117.5)	45.5 (113.9)	41.4 (106.5)	38.5 (101.3)	39.6 (103.3)	40.5 (104.9)	39.3 (102.7)	35.5 (95.9)	47.5 (117.5)
Mean daily maximum °C (°F)	27.7 (81.9)	30.7 (87.3)	35.3 (95.5)	38.7 (101.7)	39.6 (103.3)	37.1 (98.8)	32.2 (90.0)	30.9 (87.6)	32.2 (90.0)	34.7 (94.5)	32.4 (90.3)	29.1 (84.4)	33.4 (92.1)
Mean daily minimum °C (°F)	12.8 (55.0)	14.9 (58.8)	19.2 (66.6)	22.9 (73.2)	26.0 (78.8)	26.7 (80.1)	25.4 (77.7)	24.7 (76.5)	24.4 (75.9)	22.3 (72.1)	18.0 (64.4)	14.3 (57.7)	20.9 (69.6)
Record low °C (°F)	2.0 (35.6)	4.1 (39.4)	8.0 (46.4)	13.5 (56.3)	18.5 (65.3)	16.8 (62.2)	18.2 (64.8)	17.2 (63.0)	18.3 (64.9)	12.1 (53.8)	8.3 (46.9)	5.8 (42.4)	2.0 (35.6)
Average rainfall mm (inches)	1.8 (0.07)	0.0 (0.0)	0.4 (0.02)	0.3 (0.01)	1.9 (0.07)	101.7 (4.00)	275.6 (10.85)	305.0 (12.01)	129.3 (5.09)	14.0 (0.55)	2.3 (0.09)	1.0 (0.04)	833.3 (32.81)
Average rainy days	0.2	0.0	0.1	0.0	0.2	4.1	12.6	11.7	6.4	0.8	0.2	0.2	36.5
Average relative humidity (%) (at 17:30 IST)	43	37	31	32	41	54	75	77	69	50	46	48	50
Source: India Meteorological Department

== Demographics ==
As of 2001 India census, Vallabh Vidyanagar had a population of 29,260. Males constitute 56% of the population and females 44%. Vallabh Vidyanagar has an average literacy rate of 83%, higher than the national average of 59.5%: male literacy is 88%, and female literacy is 77%. In Vallabh Vidyanagar, 8% of the population is under 6 years of age.
