= Larsen & Toubro =

Indian multinational conglomerate company

Larsen & Toubro Limited

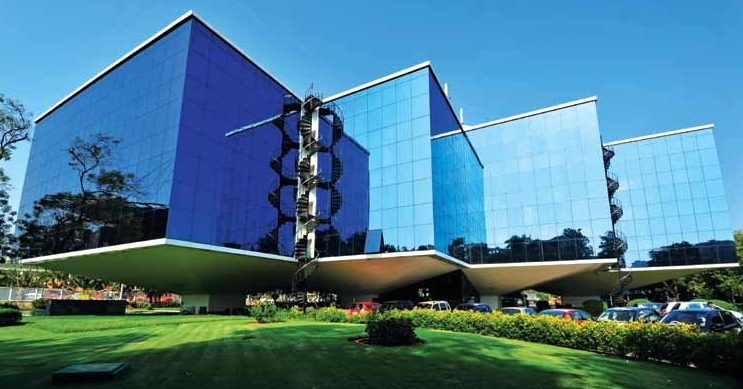
- L&T office in Manapakkam, Chennai with core sector divisions
- Type: Public
- Traded as: BSE: 500510; NSE: LT; BSE SENSEX constituent; NSE NIFTY 50 constituent
- ISIN: INE018A01030
- Industry: Conglomerate
- Founded: 7 February 1946; 80 years ago Bombay, Bombay Presidency, British India (present-day Mumbai, Maharashtra, India)
- Founders: Henning Holck-Larsen; Søren Kristian Toubro
- Headquarters: L&T House, Ballard Estate, Mumbai, Maharashtra, India
- Area served: Worldwide
- Key people: A. M. Naik (Chairman Emeritus); S. N. Subrahmanyan (Chairman & MD); R. Shankar Raman (CFO)
- Products: Construction equipment; Defence systems & naval vessels; Heavy machinery; Mining equipment; Power generation equipment; Rubber processing machinery; Valves
- Services: B2B e-commerce; EPC & Construction; Financial services; IT & Engineering services; Mass rapid transit; Real estate
- Revenue: ▲₹290,860 crore (US$30 billion) (2026)
- Operating income: ▲₹35,411 crore (US$3.7 billion) (2026)
- Net income: ▲₹18,954 crore (US$2.0 billion) (2026)
- Total assets: ▲₹452,383 crore (US$47 billion) (2026)
- Total equity: ▲₹109,290 crore (US$11 billion) (2026)
- Number of employees: 407,438 (2024)
- Divisions: Real Estate (Realty); Technology; B2B eCommerce; Engineering; Construction; Manufacturing
- Subsidiaries: LTM; L&T Technology Services; L&T Heavy Engineering; L&T Metro Rail; L&T Realty; L&T Shipbuilding
- Website: www.larsentoubro.com

Larsen & Toubro Limited (L&T) is an Indian multinational conglomerate headquartered in Mumbai. It operates in sectors including industrial technology, heavy industry, engineering, construction, manufacturing, power, information technology, defence, and financial services.

L&T was founded in 1938 in Bombay by Danish engineers Henning Holck-Larsen and Søren Kristian Toubro. As of 31 March 2022, the L&T Group consisted of 93 subsidiaries, 5 associate companies, 27 joint ventures, and 35 joint operations. As of 1 October 2023, S N Subrahmanyan serves as the chairman and managing director of L&T, having succeeded A M Naik.

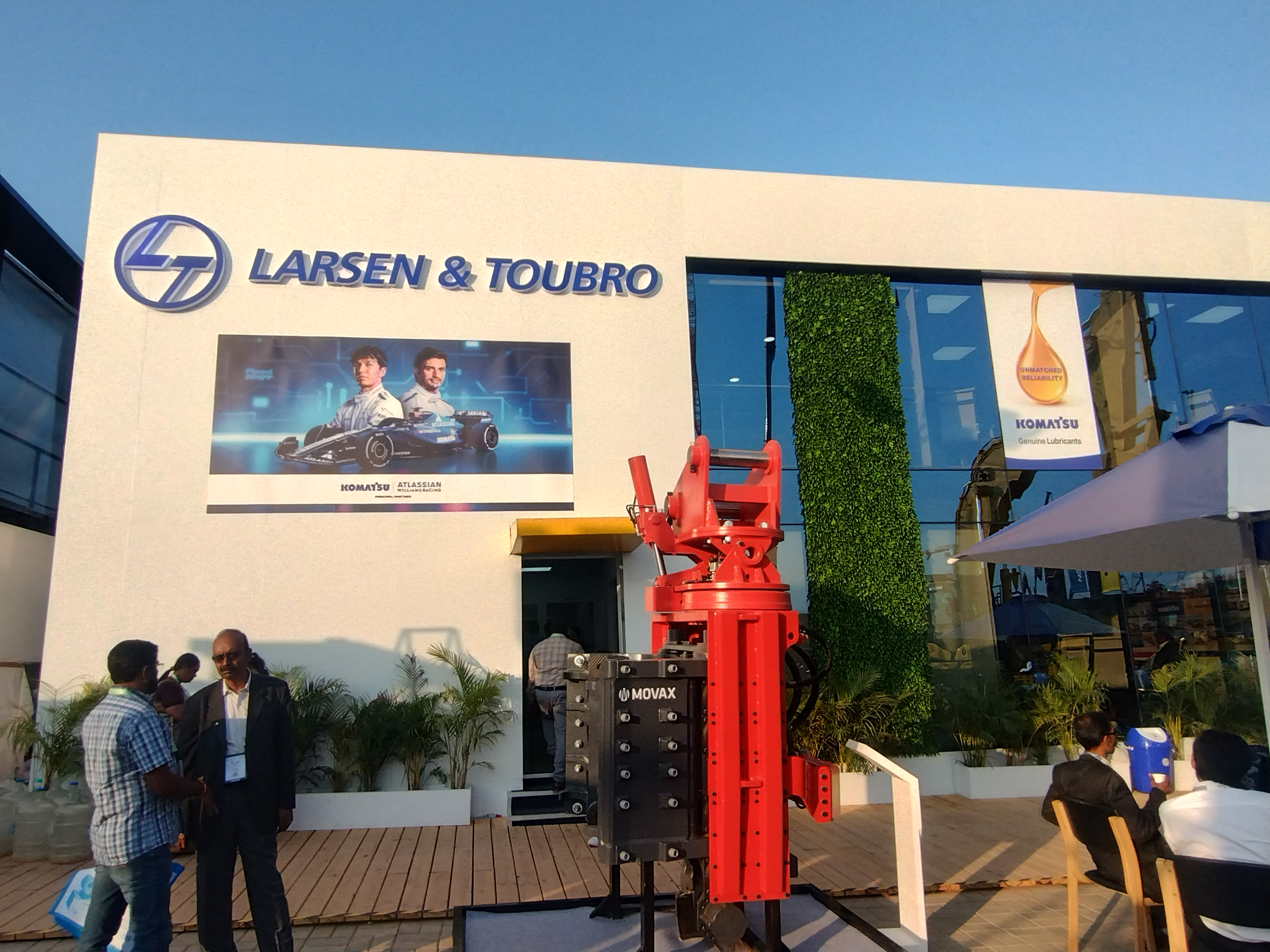
L&T at EXCON 2025, BIEC

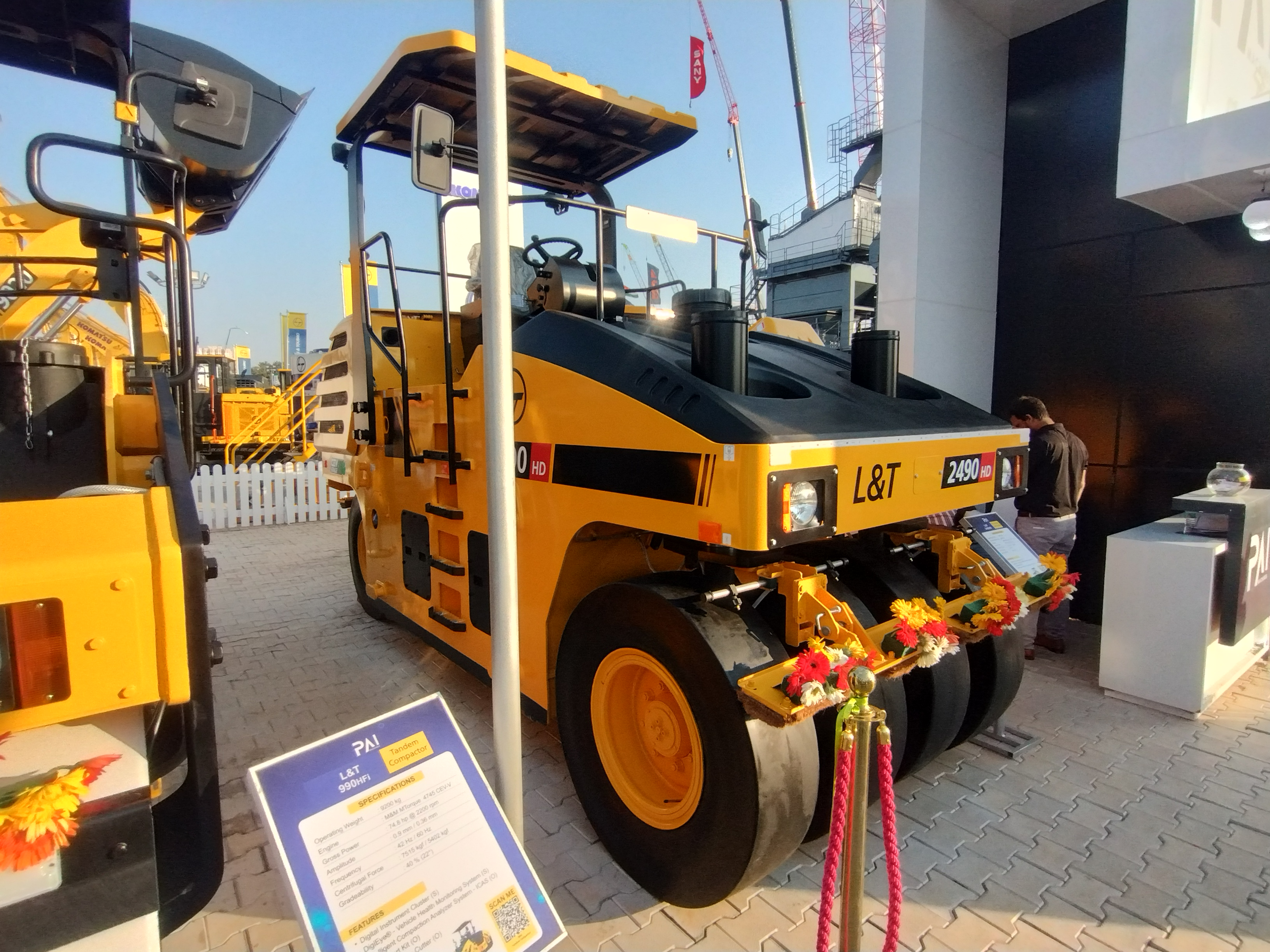
L&T 2490 HD Pneumatic Tyred Roller at EXCON 2025

L&T at 9th Bengaluru Space Expo 2026, BIEC

Larsen & Toubro at exhibitions

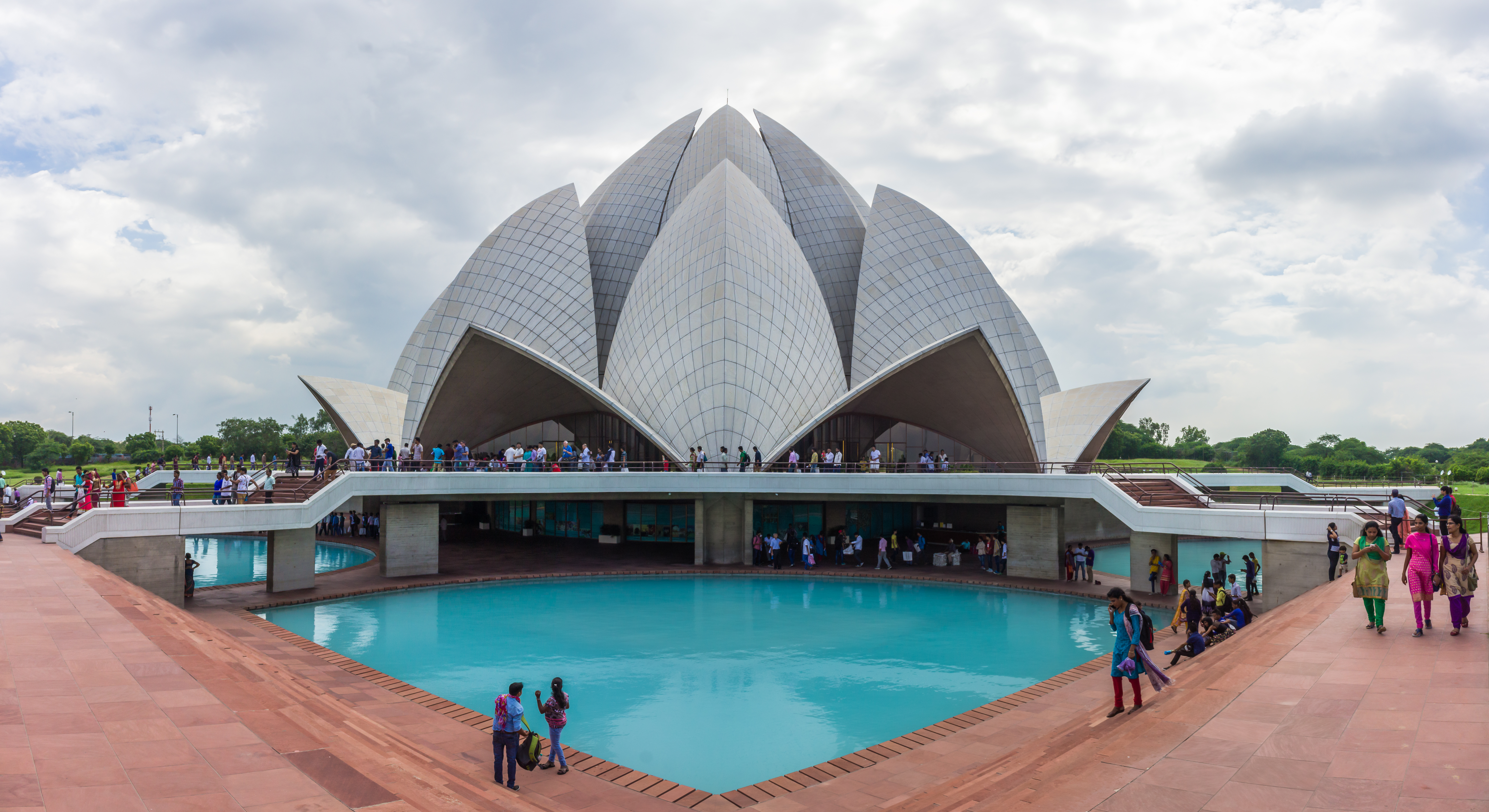
Lotus Temple, Delhi

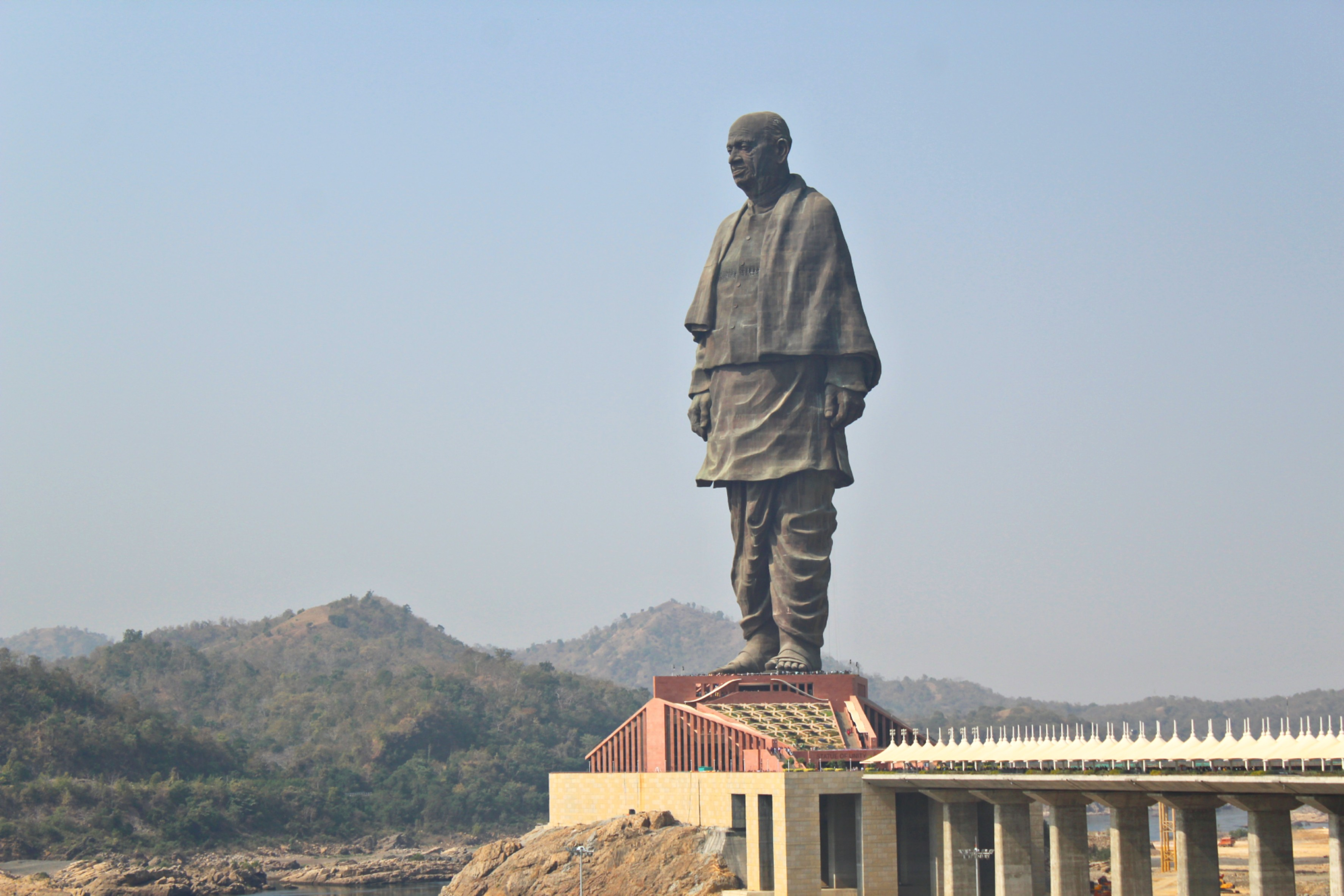
Statue of Unity, Kevadia

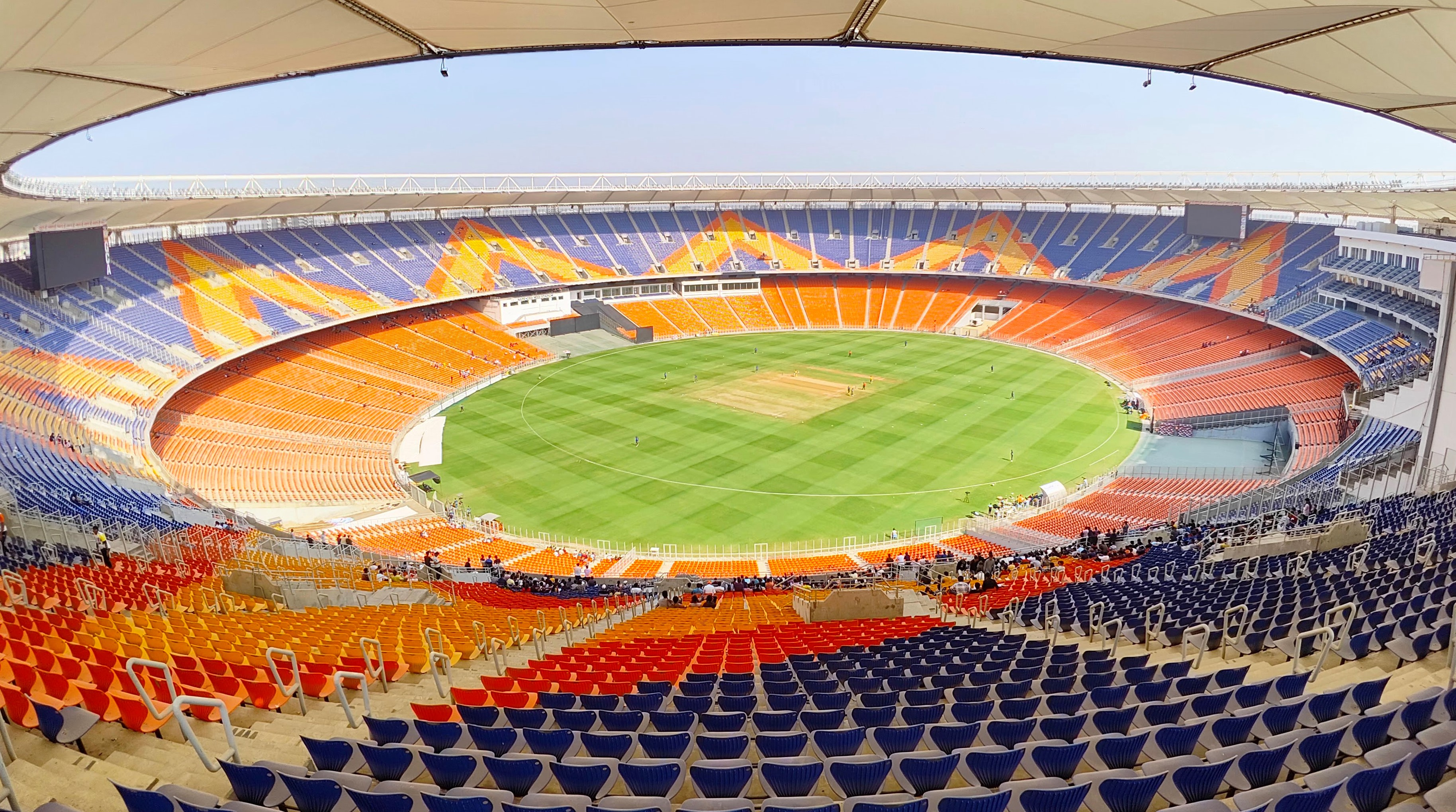
Narendra Modi Stadium, Ahmedabad

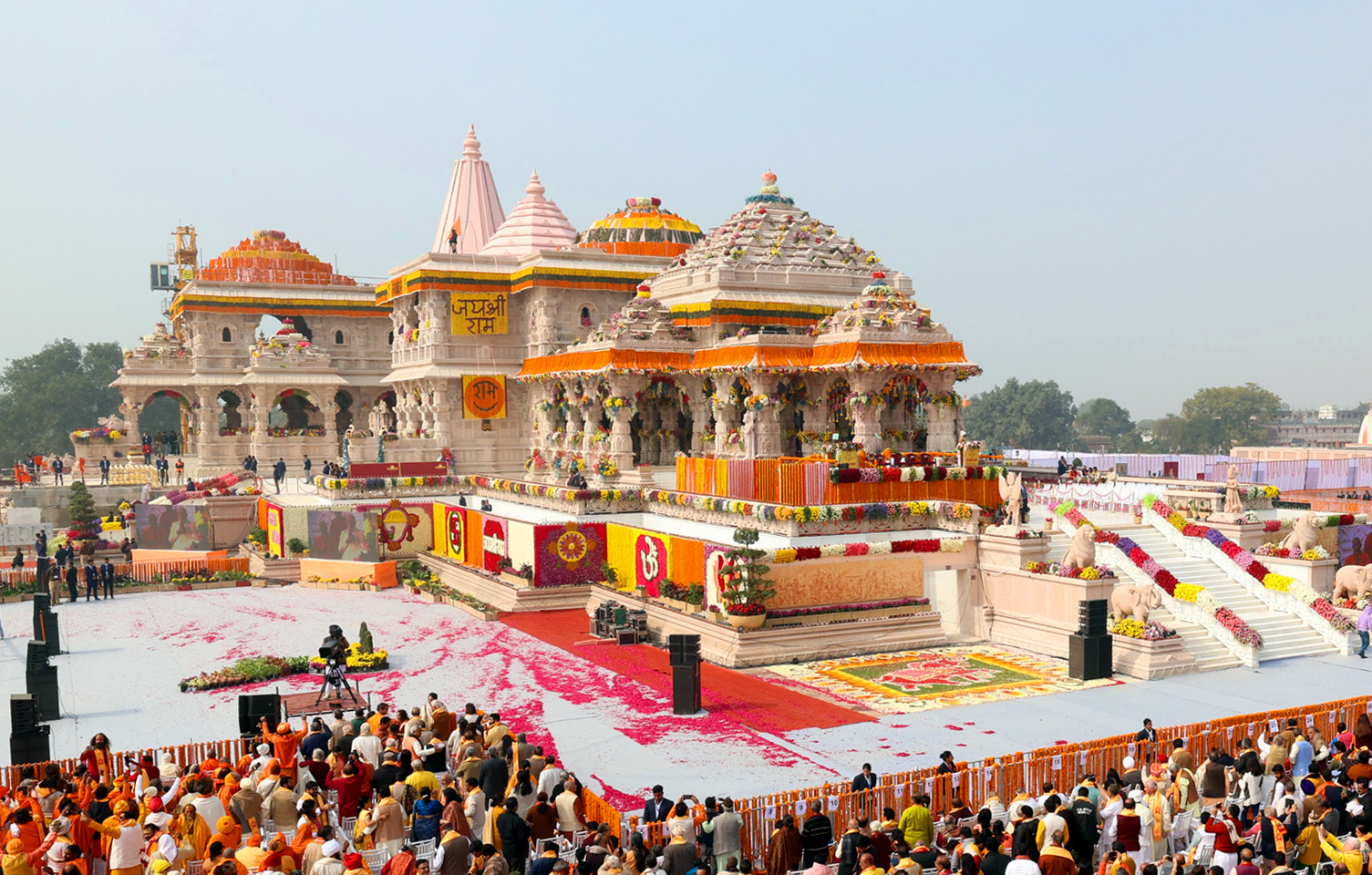
Ram Mandir, Ayodhya

L&T's notable construction projects

== History ==
Henning Holck-Larsen and Søren Kristian Toubro were in India to represent the interests of the Danish dairy equipment manufacturer FLSmidth when they founded L&T through an oral agreement in 1938. The company was legally incorporated in 1946.

The start of World War II in 1939 and the resulting blockade of trade, led Larsen and Toubro to undertake jobs and provide service facilities. The German invasion of Denmark in April 1940 stopped supplies of Danish products. The war-time need to repair, refit, and degauss ships offered L&T an opportunity, and led to the formation of a new company, Hilda Ltd, to handle these operations. L&T also started to repair and fabricate ships. The internment of German engineers in India who were to construct a soda ash plant for the Tata Group gave L&T a chance to enter the field of installation.

In 1946, they incorporated Engineering Construction & Contracts Ltd. (ECC) to focus on construction projects. ECC now exists as the construction division of L&T. By 1947, the company represented the manufacturers of equipment used to manufacture products such as hydrogenated oils, biscuits, soaps and glass. In 1947, the company signed an agreement with Caterpillar Tractor Company to market earth moving equipment. At the end of the war, large numbers of war-surplus Caterpillar equipment were available at attractive prices, but the finances required were beyond the capacity of the partners. This prompted them to raise additional equity capital, and on 7 February 1946, Larsen & Toubro Private Limited was incorporated.

In 1947, the firm set up offices in Calcutta and Madras and New Delhi. In 1948, 22 hectares (55 acres) of undeveloped marsh and jungle was acquired in Powai, Mumbai. In December 1950, L&T became a public company with a paid-up capital of ₹20 lakh (equivalent to ₹22 crore or US$2.3 million in 2023). The sales turnover in that year was ₹1.09 crore (equivalent to ₹120 crore or US$13 million in 2023). In 1956, a major part of the company's Bombay office moved to ICI House in Ballard Estate, which would later be purchased by the company and renamed as L&T House, its present headquarters.

During the 1960s, ventures included the Utkal Machinery Limited (UTMAL, set up in 1960), Audco India Limited (1961), Eutectic Welding Alloys (1962) and Tractor Engineers Limited (TENGL, 1963).

In 1965, the firm was chosen as a partner for building nuclear reactors. Dr. Homi Bhabha, chairman of the Atomic Energy Commission had approached L&T in the 1950s to fabricate critical components for nuclear reactors.

During the 1970s, L&T was contracted to work with Indian Space Research Organisation (ISRO). Chairman Vikram Sarabhai chose L&T as manufacturing partner.

In 1976, ECC bid for an airport project in Abu Dhabi. ECC's balance sheet, however, did not meet the bid's financial qualification requirement so it was merged into L&T. ECC was eventually renamed L&T Construction and now accounts for the largest portion of the group's annual revenue.

In 1985, L&T entered into a partnership with the Defence Research and Development Organisation (DRDO). L&T was not yet allowed by the government to manufacture defence equipment but was permitted to participate in design and development programmes with DRDO. After the design and development was done, the firm had to hand over all the drawings to DRDO. The Indian government would then assign the production work to a public sector defence unit or ordnance factory for manufacture. The firm currently makes a range of weapon and missile systems, command and control systems, engineering systems, and submarines through DRDO. Larsen & Toubro established a financial services subsidiary called L&T Finance in November 1994.

In 2015, the company began developing commercial, retail and office space around the Hyderabad Metro Rail project. In June 2019, the company acquired a controlling stake in IT services company Mindtree. In 2022, L&T purchased the whole ownership stake that was held by Chiyoda Corporation, a Japanese engineering company, in their joint venture, L&T-Chiyoda, which was formed in 1994.

As of 2024, L&T is India's largest private-sector defence manufacturing company by revenue. In 2024, company was in the process of expanding its space business, including manufacturing space launch vehicles and satellites. L&T is the production partner for the DRDO designed Zorawar light tank, unveiling a prototype in 2024.

In January 2025, the Ministry of Defence rejected the joint bid by L&T and Navantia, a Spanish shipbuilding company, for the Indian Navy's Project-75(I) submarine program for technical reasons. L&T, in a consortium with Hindustan Aeronautics Limited, manufactured the first privately built variant of the Polar Satellite Launch Vehicle (PSLV), designated PSLV-XL N1, which was scheduled to launch in 2025.

In March 2025, L&T was awarded an order from QatarEnergy LNG, a Qatari liquefied gas company, for the engineering, procurement, fabrication, installation, and commissioning of two offshore compression complexes for the North Field Production Sustainability Offshore Compression Project. The order, worth US$4 billion, is the largest order in L&T's history.

== Major subsidiaries ==
=== Construction ===
- L&T Construction & development
- L&T Realty

=== EPC Projects ===
- L&T Valves
- L&T Energy Hydrocarbon
- L&T CarbonLite-Solutions(previously Power)

=== Technology ===
- LTM
- L&T Technology Services

=== Manufacturing ===
- L&T Heavy Engineering
- L&T Precision Engineering and Systems
- L&T Shipbuilding
- L&T Rubber Processing Machinery

=== Financial services ===
- L&T Finance

=== Digital ===
- L&T-SuFin
- L&T Edutech Engineering

== Other subsidiaries and joint ventures ==
As of 31 March 2022, L&T has 93 subsidiaries, 5 associate companies, 27 joint ventures and 35 joint operations.

- L&T – Construction Equipment Limited: having its registered office at Mumbai, India and focusing on construction equipment and mining equipment, L&T-Komatsu Limited was a joint-venture of Larsen and Toubro, and Komatsu Asia Pacific Pte Limited, Singapore, a wholly owned subsidiary of Komatsu Limited, Japan. Komatsu is the world's second largest manufacturer of hydraulic excavators and has manufacturing and marketing facilities. The plant was started in 1975 by L&T to manufacture hydraulic excavators for the first time in India. In 1998, it became a joint-venture. The Bengaluru works comprise machinery and hydraulics works, with a manufacturing facility for design, manufacture, and servicing of earth moving equipment. In April 2013, L&T bought the 50% stake held by Komatsu Asia & Pacific. The company's name was changed to L&T Construction Equipment Limited.
- L&T jointly with Qatari company Al Balagh group were the main contractors for the Al Rayyan stadium, where the 2022 FIFA World Cup was held.
- A partnership between L&T Finance and Sonalika Group farm equipment maker International Tractors Ltd in April 2014 provided credit and financing to customers of Sonalika Group in India.
- L&T Special Steels and Heavy Forgings Pvt Ltd. is a joint venture between L&T and the Nuclear Power Corporation of India (NPCIL), headquartered at Hazira. It is the largest integrated steel plant and heavy forging unit in India, capable of producing forgings weighing 120 MT each. LTSSHF currently is engaged in projects from the nuclear, hydrocarbon, power and oil and gas sectors.
- L&T-Sargent & Lundy Limited (L&T-S&L), established in 1995, is an engineering and consultancy firm in the power sector, formed by L&T and Sargent & Lundy L.L.C. - USA, a global consulting firm in the power industry since 1891.
- SA & Alstom Projects India. A joint venture between L&T and Alstom, a French rolling stock manufacturing company, that works on metro rail projects.
- L&T MBDA Missile Systems. Founded in 2017, L&T MBDA Missile Systems is a joint venture between L&T and European missile company, MBDA. Owned 51% by L&T and 49% by MBDA, the joint venture was formed to produce and supply missiles and missile systems to the Indian Armed Forces.

== Divestments ==
L&T has across the decades exited from several businesses. These include:

=== Cement ===
L&T sold its 16.5 million tonne/per year capacity cement division to UltraTech Cement and also divested its 8.5% stake in A V Birla group company Grasim Industries in 2004.

=== L&T-John Deere ===
In 1992, L&T established a 50-50 joint venture with John Deere to manufacture tractors in India, called L&T - John Deere. L&T sold their interest to John Deere in 2005.

=== L&T Case ===
In 1992, L&T established L&T-Case Construction with CNH Global as a 50-50 joint venture to build backhoes. In 2011, L&T sold its share to CNH, and the company was renamed Case New Holland Construction Equipment India.

=== L&T Medical Equipment and Systems ===
In 1987, L&T launched the L&T Medical Equipment & Systems division. In November 2012, it was sold to Skanray Technologies Pvt Ltd. It manufactures surgical robots, MRI, X-ray, DR Imaging etc.

=== EWAC Alloys Limited ===
EWAC Alloys Limited was a wholly owned subsidiary of L&T. The company was engaged in design & development, manufacture and supply of special welding electrodes, gas brazing rods and fluxes, welding torches and accessories, atomised metal powder alloys, flux cored continuous wires & wire feeders, polymer compounds & wear-resistant plates.

Prof Wasserman, founder of Eutectic Castolin, and Henning Hock Larsen, founder of L&T, founded the Eutectic Division in India in the year 1962. Eutectic Castolin was later merged into the Messer Group of companies, Germany and referred as Messer Eutectic Castolin (MEC). In 2010, L&T, bought the entire stake from Messer to become the wholly owned subsidiary of it. The current headquarters is in Ankleshwar, Gujarat (India), and the products are sold under the name EWAC.

L&T sold its entire stake in unlisted subsidiary EWAC Alloys to UK-registered ESAB Holdings for a total consideration of Rs 522 crore. The share purchase agreement has been executed on 11 October 2017. The acquirer ESAB offers products for welding and cutting process. In 2012, ESAB was acquired by Colfax Corp., a diversified industrial manufacturing company based in the US.

=== Petroleum Dispensing Pump (PDP) ===
In November 2009, Larsen and Toubro (L&T) sold its petroleum dispensing pump (PDP) business to Gilbarco Veeder-Root, a US-based payments systems company, for around Rs 150 crore. Gilbarco has signed a definitive purchase agreement to acquire the business. With the completion of acquisition, L&T's PDP business will become part of a new division called Gilbarco Veeder-Root India Pvt Ltd.

=== L&T Kobelco Machinery Private Limited ===
This was a joint venture of L&T and Kobe Steel of Japan, to manufacture internal mixers and twin screw roller-head extruder's for the tyre industry. L&T sold its entire 51% stake in L&T Kobelco Machinery Private to its joint venture partner in the company, Kobe Steel of Japan, for Rs 43.5 crore.

=== L&T Electrical and Automation Ltd. ===
L&T was an international manufacturer of electrical and electronic products and systems. The company manufactured custom-engineered switchboards for industrial sectors like power, refineries, petrochemicals and cement. In the electronic segment, L&T offered a range of metres and provides control automation systems for industries. In May 2018, the firm signed a definitive agreement with Schneider Electric for the strategic divestment of its electrical and automation (E&A) business in an all-cash deal of ₹14,000 crore. The deal was completed on 31 August 2020 after receiving the requisite regulatory approvals. L&T has said that its exit from the electrical and automation business is a part of its strategic portfolio review process.

=== L&T Mutual Fund ===
L&T Mutual Fund was the mutual fund company of the L&T Group. Its average assets under management (AUM) as of May 2019 is ₹ 73,936.68 crore. On November 26, 2022, L&T Mutual Fund was sold to HSBC.

=== L&T Infrastructure Development Projects Limited ===
Larsen & Toubro, signed an agreement to divest its stake in L&T IDPL to a portfolio company of Infrastructure Yield Plus II, an infrastructure fund managed by Edelweiss Alternatives in December 2022. The transaction is subject to completion of customary closing conditions including receipt of applicable regulatory and other approvals.

== Listing and shareholding ==
The equity shares of the company are listed on the Bombay Stock Exchange (BSE) and the National Stock Exchange of India (NSE). The company's shares constitute a part of the BSE SENSEX of the BSE as well as the NIFTY 50 index of the NSE. Its global depository receipts (GDR) are listed on the Luxembourg Stock Exchange and London Stock Exchange.

=== Shareholders ===
Shareholders as of 31 December 2022

Category	No. of Shares	%
Financial Institutions	21,28,76,252	15.15
Foreign Portfolio Investors	32,30,70,981	22.99
Shares underlying GDRs	1,85,26,770	1.32
Mutual Funds	24,49,70,289	17.43
Bodies Corporate	1,51,76,276	1.08
Qualified Institutional Buyer	8,85,65,413	6.30
Directors & Relatives	17,84,815	0.13
L&T Employees Trust	19,25,58,158	13.70
Others	30,78,35,173	21.90
TOTAL	1,40,53,64,127	100.00

== Employees ==
As on 31 March 2022, the company had 45,615 permanent employees, out of which 2,997 were women and 48 employees with disabilities. At the same period company had 200,062 workers on contract basis.

== Awards and recognition ==
- L&T ranked 2nd in Top 25 EPC Contractors 2022 in the Middle East List by Oil & Gas Middle East
- L&T ranked 4th in the 2021 LinkedIn Top Companies list, India
- In 2021, L&T won the Innovation in Onboarding at the OLX People HR Excellence awards by The Economic Times HRWorld
- L&T Hydrocarbon won the Federation of Indian Petroleum Industry (FIPI) ‘Engineering Procurement Construction (EPC) - Company of the Year’ Award for 2020
- In 1997, the Bengaluru Works division was awarded the "Best of all" Rajiv Gandhi National Quality Award
- In 2013, L&T Power received 'Golden Peacock National Quality Award – 2012' at the 23rd World Congress on 'Leadership & Quality of Governance'.
- L&T ranked at No.22 among World's Best Employers and No.1 in India by Forbes for 2018.

== Industry collaboration ==
An agreement has been signed by Nibe Space, a division of Nibe Defence and Aerospace on 9 September 2024, with Larsen & Toubro, Skyroot Aerospace, Centum Electronics, AgniKul Cosmos, SpaceFields, Sisir Radar and CYRAN AI Solutions for the launch of India's first constellation of multi-sensor, all-weather, high-revisit Earth observation satellites.

== Controversy ==
In January 2025, an undated video of Subrahmanyan's New Year address sparked widespread controversy online. In the video, an employee is heard asking why Larsen & Toubro, one of India's largest conglomerates, requires employees to work on Saturdays. In response, Subrahmanyan expressed remorse not being able to make employees work on Sundays, stating it would make him happier since he himself works on Sundays. He further questioned that what do employees do "sitting at home" and how long could spouses stare at each other, suggesting that employees should "Get to the office and start working" on Sundays instead. Shortly after the video went viral, Meena Subrahmanyan, his wife, became the target of widespread trolling on social media due to her husband's remarks.

Subrahmanyan justified this stance by citing a conversation with a Chinese individual who claimed that China's longer work hours could enable them to surpass the United States. He subsequently endorsed a 90-hour workweek for employees, adding that such effort was necessary for achieving success. However, his statements were contradicted by a 2021 United Nations report, which highlighted the detrimental effects of excessive work hours on mental and physical health.

The remarks reignited concerns about toxic work environments in India, especially following the 2024 suicide of an Indian Chartered Accountant and death due to heart attack of another one attributed to work pressure. This controversy also brought attention to Subrahmanyan's substantial remuneration in 2024, which amounted to ₹510,000,000 (approximately $6,000,000 in 2025), compared to L&T's median employee salary of ₹955,000 (approximately $11,000 in 2025).

Prominent figures such as Harsh Goenka, Deepika Padukone, Anand Mahindra, Anupam Mittal and Cyrus Poonawalla expressed their disapproval of Subrahmanyan's remarks on social media. A spokesperson for Larsen & Toubro defended his statements, describing them as a call for collective dedication and effort to drive progress and achieve the shared vision of India, emphasizing that extraordinary outcomes demand extraordinary effort.

== See also ==
- List of companies of India
- Jakson Group
- Bharat Heavy Electricals Limited
- Engineers India
- Walchandnagar Industries
- List of oilfield service companies
