= A. M. Naik =

Chairman Emeritus of Larsen and Toubro

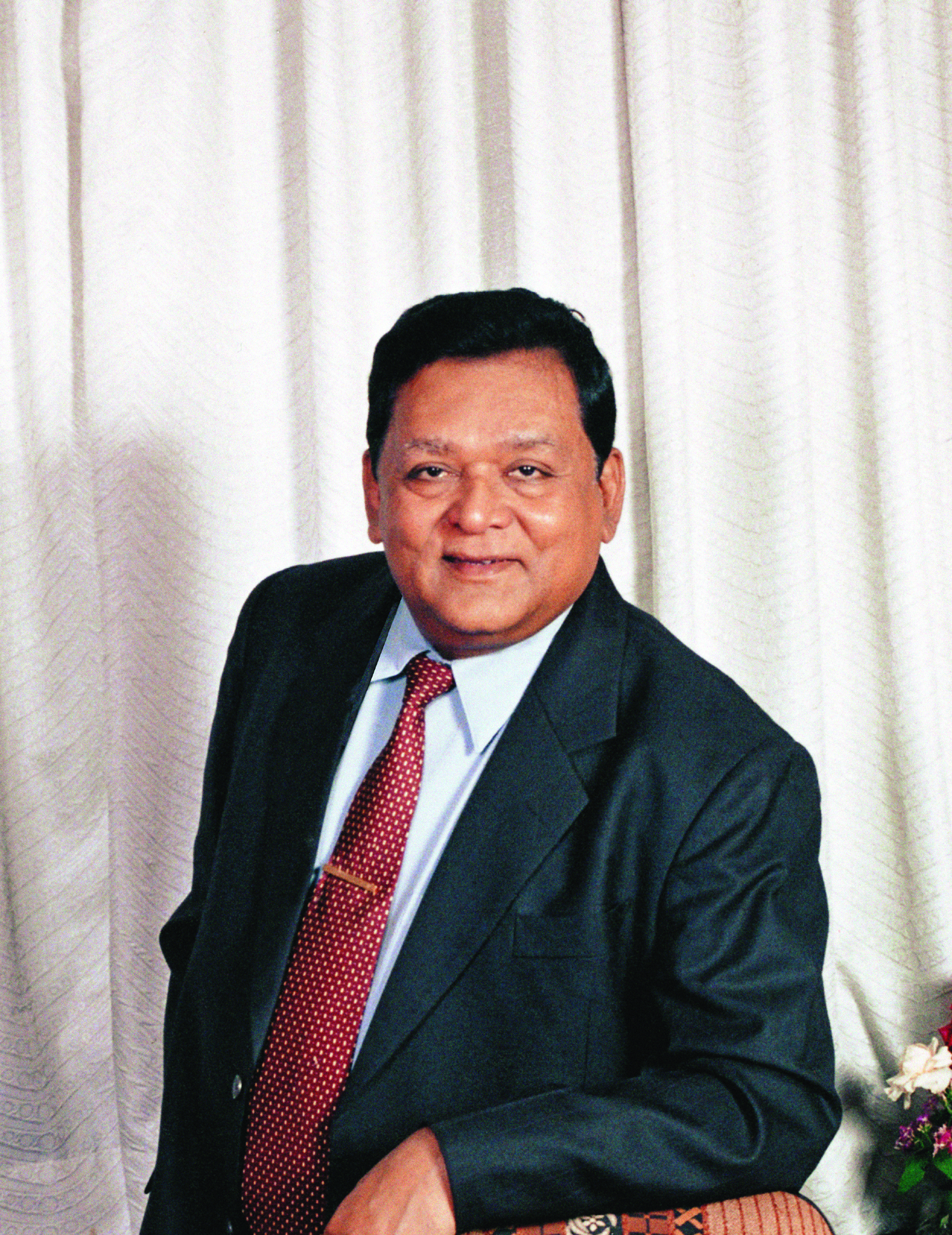
- Born: Anil Manibhai Naik; 9 June 1942 (age 84); Navsari, Province of Bombay, British India, (now Gujarat, India)
- Education: Birla Vishvakarma Mahavidyalaya Engineering college (B. E. in Mechanical Engineering)
- Occupation: Chairman Emeritus of Larsen & Toubro
- Spouse: Geeta Naik
- Children: 2
- Awards: Padma Vibhushan (2019); Padma Bhushan (2009)

Anil Manibhai Naik (born 9 June 1942) is an Indian industrialist, philanthropist and the chairman emeritus of Larsen & Toubro, an Indian engineering conglomerate, and a former chairman of the National Skill Development Corporation.

He was awarded the Padma Bhushan, India's 3rd highest civilian award, in 2009. In 2019, he was awarded the Padma Vibhushan, India's 2nd highest civilian award. Naik is also the recipient of the 'Economic Times - Business Leader of the Year Award, for the year 2008.

== Early life ==
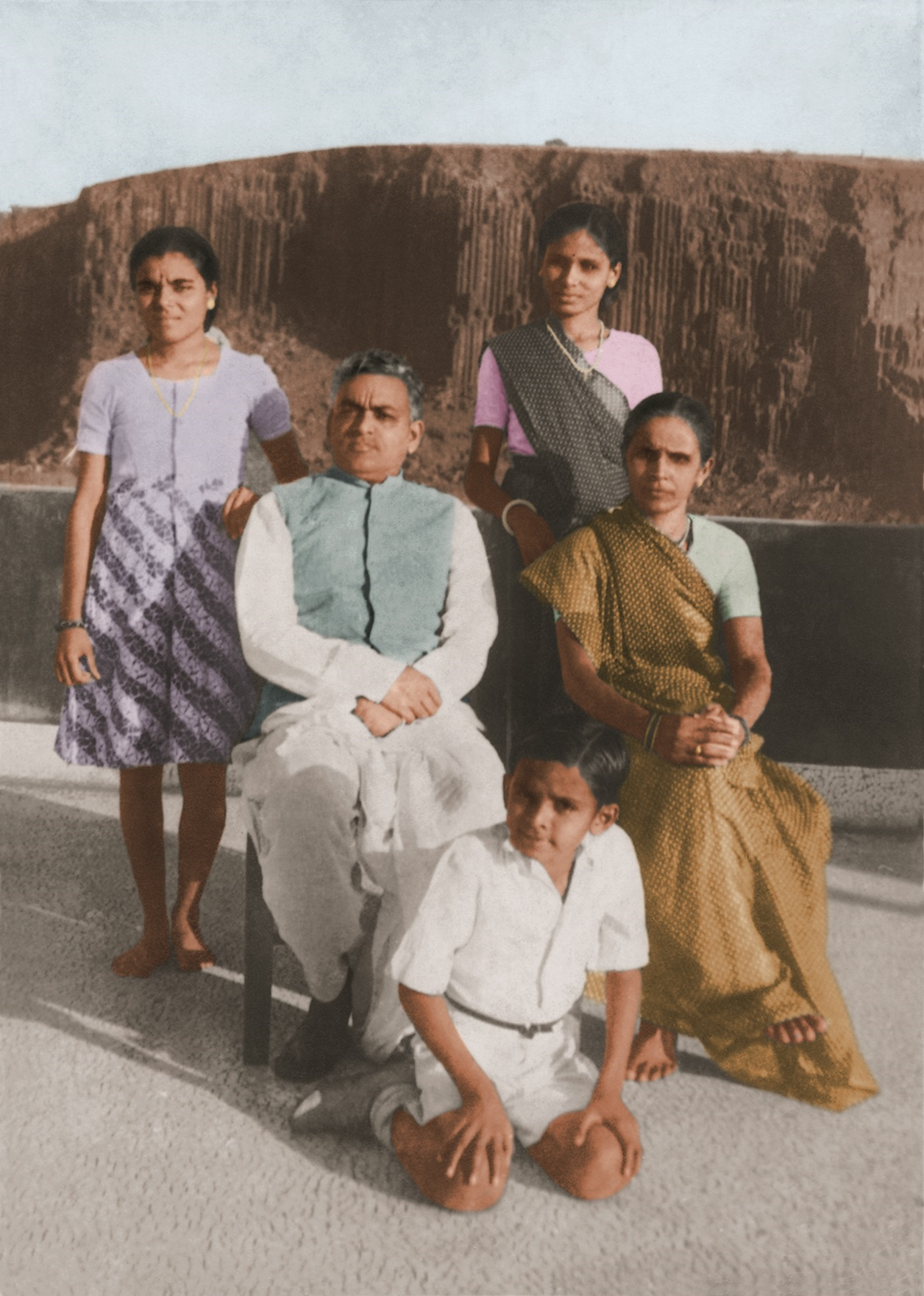
Young Anil with parents and sisters

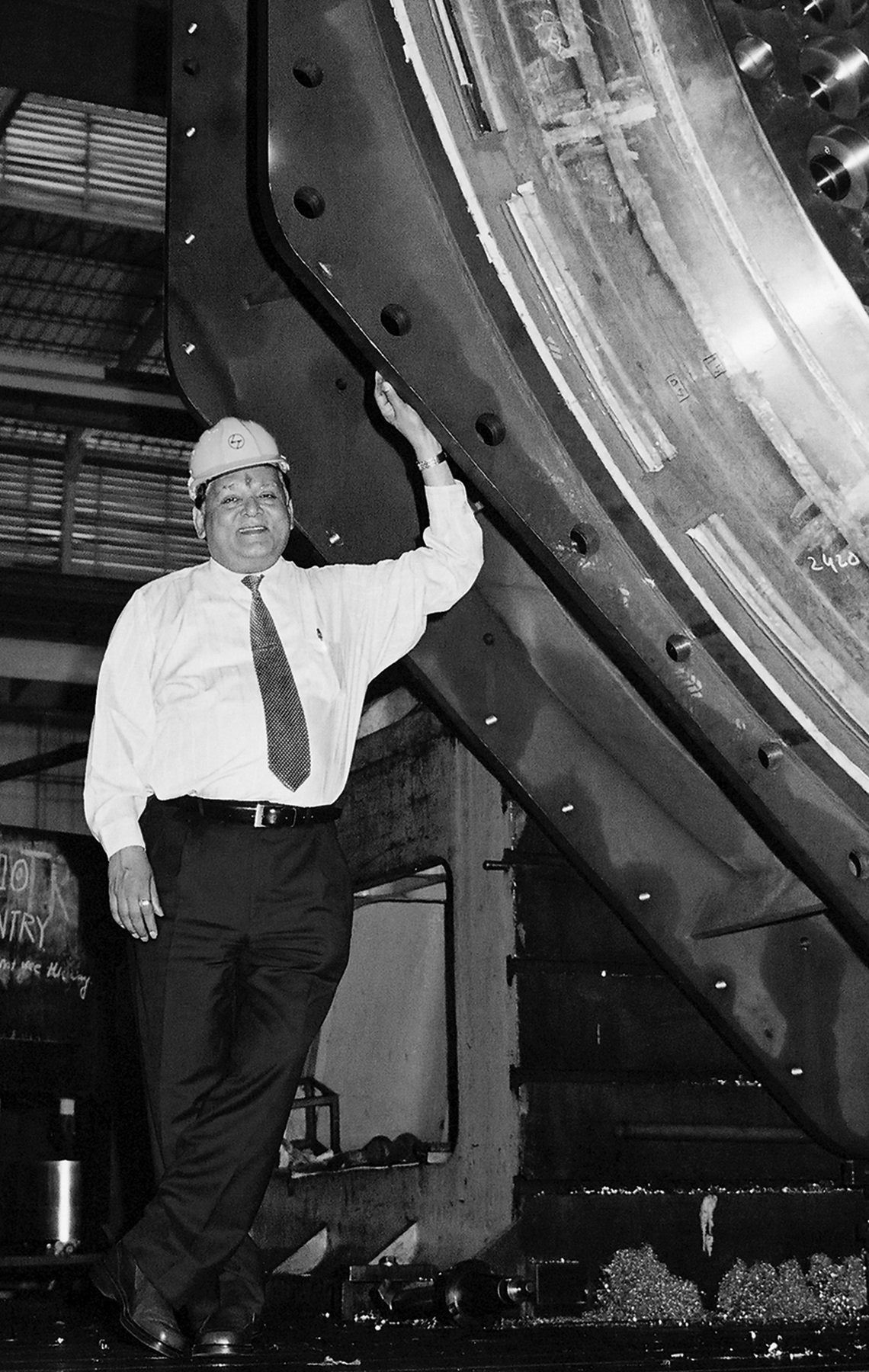
Mr. A.M.Naik at L&T's Heavy Engineering workshop.

Naik is a Gujarati. He was born to a family of teachers in Gujarat, also referred to as Master Kutumb in Gujarati language. His father, who used to teach at Hansraj Morarji Public School in Mumbai, heeded Mahatma Gandhi's call to revitalise India's villages, and decided to return to his native village along with his family. Young Anil had finished five years at his father's school by this time, and the rest of his schooling was obtained from schools in Endhal and the neighbouring village of Kharel. In June 1958, Naik enrolled at V.P. Science College in Vallabh Vidyanagar, where he would prepare for a year for admission to an engineering college.

He graduated with a bachelor's degree in mechanical engineering from Birla Vishvakarma Mahavidyalaya Engineering college in Vallabh Vidyanagar in Gujarat.

After graduation, he went to Mumbai with a note from his father introducing him to Viren J. Shah (another HMPS alumnus) working in Mukand Iron & Steel Works Limited to apply for its engineering programme. Due to his lack of proficiency in English, the personnel manager had asked him to improve his English. So Naik started working on his English skills. In the meantime, he joined Nestor Boilers, which was a Parsi-owned firm. Changes in ownership and management style at Nestor Boilers prompted Naik to turn to L&T.

== Career at L&T ==
On 15 March 1965, Naik joined L&T, as a junior engineer. A rapid rise followed. He was appointed Assistant Manager within three years and 15 days of joining – a record at L&T. He was promoted as General Manager in 1986. He became Member of board of L&T Limited on 23 November 1989. In 1999, he took over as the chief executive officer and managing director. In 2003, he became the chairman of Larsen & Toubro, the first employee in the company's history to be elevated to this post. At the helm, Naik initiated the transformation process that made L&T into a more entrepreneurial organisation with increased emphasis on wealth creation for all stakeholders. In an interview to McKinsey, Naik explained his reasons for the portfolio rationalisation that he undertook. In 2017, he stepped aside from executive responsibilities, and took over as Group Chairman. In May 2023, Naik was appointed the Chairman Emeritus of the company.

=== Ring fencing L&T ===
In the late 1980s, L&T encountered a takeover attempt by a large business group (Reliance group) which seized a substantial stake in the company. The management of L&T staunchly resisted these attempts to take over the company, wanting to maintain it as India's premier, indeed only, professionally run conglomerate. The central government, through various agencies, public sector banks, insurance companies, etc., held a large portion of L&T's shareholding. A succession of governments (as many as seven) held office during this period, but L&T's prestige and standing was such that none of them did anything to contravene the wishes of the board of professionals.

Finally, the predatory investor gave up and sought a settlement. In 2002, the predatory group's entire holding was transferred to a different family-owned business house (Birla group). The following year, this shareholding was purchased by an "employee welfare trust" funded and controlled by L&T itself. In this way, the company not only fended off the predator but also fortified its position as a professionally run company by gaining control of a large shareholding. The way in which Naik thwarted the take-over and fortified L&T against such threats has been widely covered in the media.

The matter thus ended in a 'win-win', with all parties concerned being happy with the outcome. S. Gurumurthy, currently on the Board of the Reserve Bank of India described the events as a 'security threat for L&T being converted into a security ring.' The Employee Stock Options which emanated from the successful resolution of the issue gave financial security to a large section of employees, and allowed them to share in the company's growth.

=== Shaping L&T into a 'Nation Builder' ===
Naik's stewardship of L&T is characterised by a sharper focus on sectors of national significance - defence, nuclear, aerospace, infrastructure, oil & gas and power. He has been instrumental in imparting a strong, nationalistic orientation to the company's products, offerings and capabilities, giving rise to its description as 'the company that is building 21st Century India'.

He has retired from Larsen & Toubro Limited on 30 September 2023.

== Chairman – NSDC ==
In 2018, the Government of India appointed Naik the chairman of the National Skill Development Corporation – the apex body to promote skilling and part of the Skill India mission of the Prime Minister. Making the announcement, Skill Development and Entrepreneurship Minister Dharmendra Pradhan said under Naik's leadership, the corporation apart from its engagement in executing skilling modules, should also be a think-tank providing direction and necessary guidance for creating a demand-based skilling ecosystem in the country. Naik said NSDC has developed a unique model combining skill development with strong industry partnerships. NSDC, under the ministry, aims to promote skill development by catalysing creation of large, quality and for-profit vocational institutions. The organisation provides funding to build scalable and profitable vocational training initiatives.

== Philanthropy ==
In August 2016, Naik announced that he would give 75% of his income to charitable causes over his lifetime, setting up the Naik Charitable Trust for education and the Nirali Memorial Medical Trust for healthcare.

Nirali Memorial Medical Trust had entered into an agreement to set up a Cancer Hospital at Navsari which will be operated by Tata Trusts. In January 2019, the governor of Gujarat laid the foundation stone for the Cancer hospital in Navsari, Gujarat. The healthcare campus at Navsari will also house a speciality hospital for which the NMMT has tied up with the Apollo Hospitals Group. NMMT also runs Nirali Memorial Radiation Centre in nearby Surat, a multi-disciplinary hospital at Powai in Mumbai and provides modern medical facilities at a hospital at Kharel, Gujarat.

== Awards and honours ==
Year	Name	Awarding Organisation	Ref
2023	Lifetime Achievement Award	Economic Times Awards	
2023	Lifetime Achievement Award	Forbes India	
2023	Lifetime Achievement Award	Mint	
2022	Hall of Fame	CNBC-TV18	
2021	EY Entrepreneur Of The Year India 2021 Lifetime Achievement Award	Ernst & Young	
2021	Lifetime Achievement Award	Business Standard	
2019	Padma Vibhushan	Government of India	
2018	Lifetime Achievement Award	Bombay Management Association	
2018	Lifetime Achievement Award	Business Today	
2017	India's 50 Greatest CEOs Ever	Outlook Magazine	
2015	Giants International Award	Giants International	
2015	Businessman of the Year 2014 Award	Business India	
2015	Lakshya Business Business Visionary Awards 2015	National Institute of Industrial Engineering (NITIE), Mumbai	
2014	India Today Power List – 50 Most Powerful People	India Today	
2012	The Best-Performing CEOs in the World	Harvard Business Review	
2012	D.M. Trivedi Lifetime Achievement Award	Indian Chemical Council	
2012	Infrastructure Leader of the Year	Infrastructure Excellence Awards	
2012	Most Powerful CEOs	Economic Times	
2010	Asia Business Leader Award - 2010	CNBC Asia	
2010	Golden Peacock Life Time Achievement Award for Business Leadership	Golden Peacock Awards	
2010	Harish Mahindra Memorial Global Award for Outstanding Contribution to Corporate Leadership	Priyadarshni Academy	
2010	Business leader of the Year - Building India	NDTV Profit	
2010	Best CEO of the Year Award	Indian Society for Training & Development	
2010	Qimpro Platinum Standard – National Statesman Award for Excellence in Business	Qimpro Foundation	
2009	Mumbai's 50 Most Influential	DNA	
2009	India's 50 Most Powerful People	Business Week	
2009	Padma Bhushan	Government of India	
2009	Business Leader of the Year	The Economic Times	
2009	Gujarat Garima (Pride of Gujarat) Award	Government of Gujarat	
2008	Entrepreneur Of The Year	Ernst & Young	
2008	Best Transformational Leader	Asian Centre for Corporate Governance & Sustainability Awards	
2008	V. Krishnamurthy Award for Excellence	Centre for Organization Development, Hyderabad	
2005	Sankara Ratna	Sankara Nethralaya	
2004	Lifetime Achievement Excellence Award for 'Best Corporate Man of the Decade'	Foundation of Indian Industry & Economists	
2003	JRD TATA Corporate Leadership Award	All India Management Association	

- Honorary Consul General for Denmark.
- Senior member of the Confederation of Indian Industry.
- Member of the Board of Trade, Ministry of Commerce, Government of India.
- Fellow of the Indian National Academy of Engineers.
- Former Member of the Board of Governors of the Indian Institute of Management, Ahmedabad.
- Nominated as the chairman of the IIMA (IIM Ahmedabad) Society and the Board of Governors, for a period of three years starting 28 March 2012
- Conferred 'Doctor of Letters' (Honoris Causa) by the Sardar Patel University on 15 December 2011
- Conferred Doctor of Philosophy from Gujarat Technological University on 19 January 2013
- Conferred Doctor of Letters from Veer Narmad University of South Gujarat on 26 February 2016
- Conferred Doctor of Science from Maharaja Sayajirao University of Baroda in December 2016
- Ranked India's Most Generous Corporate Professional by Hurun India and Edelgive Foundation - 2021

== Personal life ==
A.M. Naik is married to Geeta Naik. They have two children, The Daughter is based in the USA: And a son, Jignesh, who works for Google moved back to India, and a daughter, Pratiksha, who runs a private medical practice.

== Bibliography ==
'The Nationalist – How A.M. Naik Transformed L&T into a Global Powerhouse', by Minhaz Merchant and published by Harper Collins.

'Strategic Brand Management for B2B Markets: A Road Map for Organizational Transformation', by Sharad Sarin and published by SAGE Publications India Pvt Ltd.

'The Art of Business Leadership : Indian experiences', by S Balasubramanian and published by Response Books.
