= Sardar Patel University =

University in Vallabh Vidyanagar, Gujarat

- Other name: SPU
- Former name: Sardar Vallabhbhai Vidyapeeth
- Motto: Character and conduct are the fruits of education
- Type: Public
- Established: October 31, 1955; 70 years ago
- Founder: Bhailalbhai Dayabhai Patel
- Accreditation: A (CGPA 3.25)
- Affiliations: UGC, NAAC
- Chancellor: Governor of Gujarat
- Vice-Chancellor: Dr. Niranjan P. Patel
- Location: Vallabh Vidyanagar, Anand,, Gujarat, 388120, India; 22.555°N 72.925°E
- Campus: 86 acres (35 ha); rural
- Website: www.spuvvn.edu

Sardar Patel University (SPU) is a public state university in Vallabh Vidyanagar, a Anand City Gujarat, India. It is named after politician Vallabhbhai Patel and was founded in October 1955 by an Act of the Legislative Assembly of the then-Bombay Province and was UGC recognized under 2(f) of the UGC Act in October 1968. Originally it had the status of a rural university.

== Jurisdiction ==
Originally, in 1955 the jurisdiction of the university (known as Sardar Vallabhbhai Vidyapeeth at that time) was limited to the 5 miles of Vallabh Vidyanagar. Under amendment (Guj. 26 of 2015) the university has its jurisdiction over two districts.

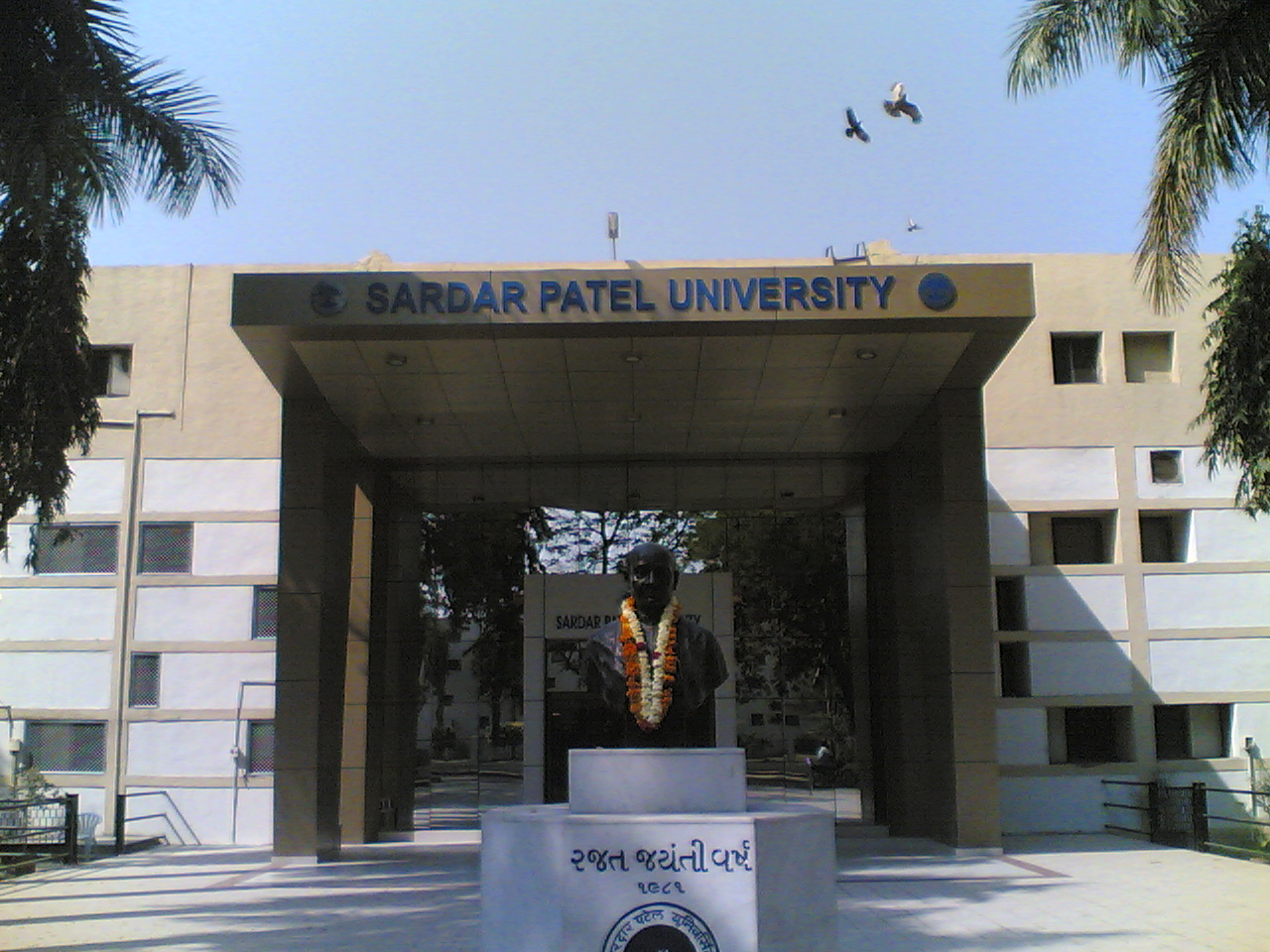
SP University Admin Building

== See also ==
- List of universities in India
- Universities and colleges in India
- University Grants Commission (India)
