= List of institutions of higher education in Gujarat =

Gujarat has both private and public universities, many of which are supported by the Government of India and the state government - Government of Gujarat. Apart from these there are private universities supported by various bodies and societies. Here is a list of research organisations and educational institutions of Gujarat.

== Universities ==
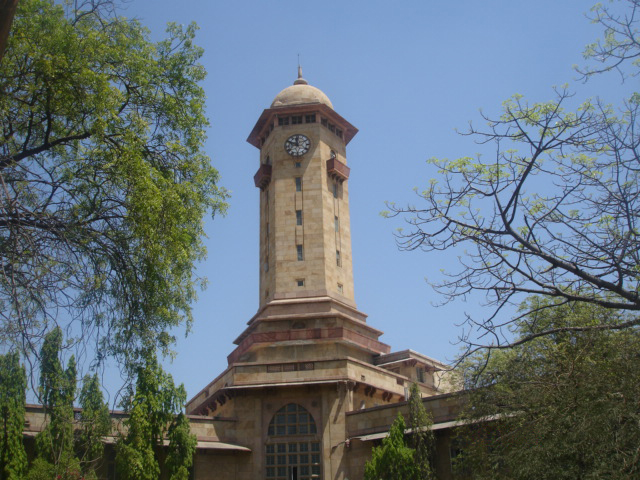
Gujarat University in Ahmedabad is the largest university in Gujarat.

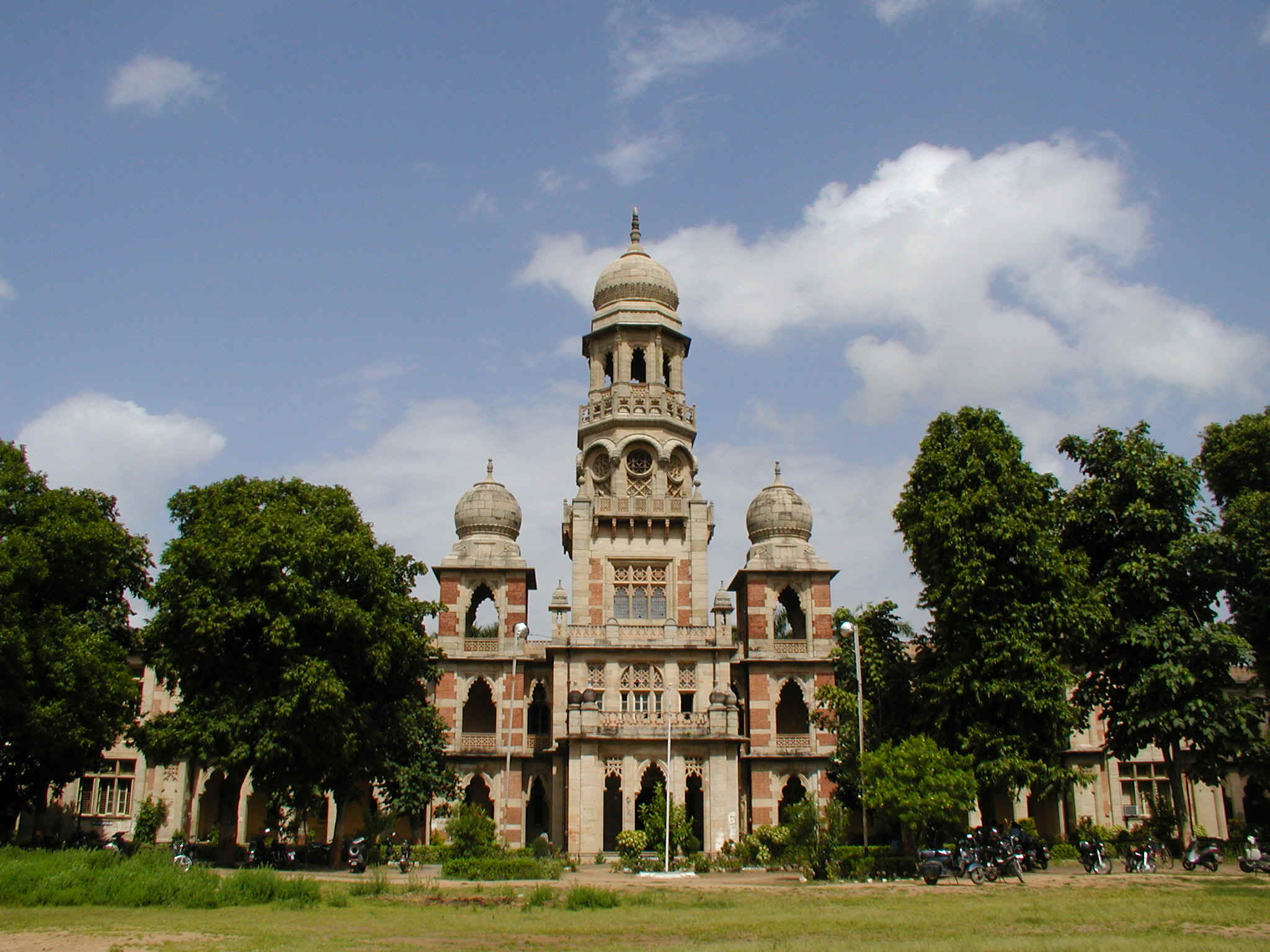
Kala Bhavan, Maharaja Sayajirao University of Baroda

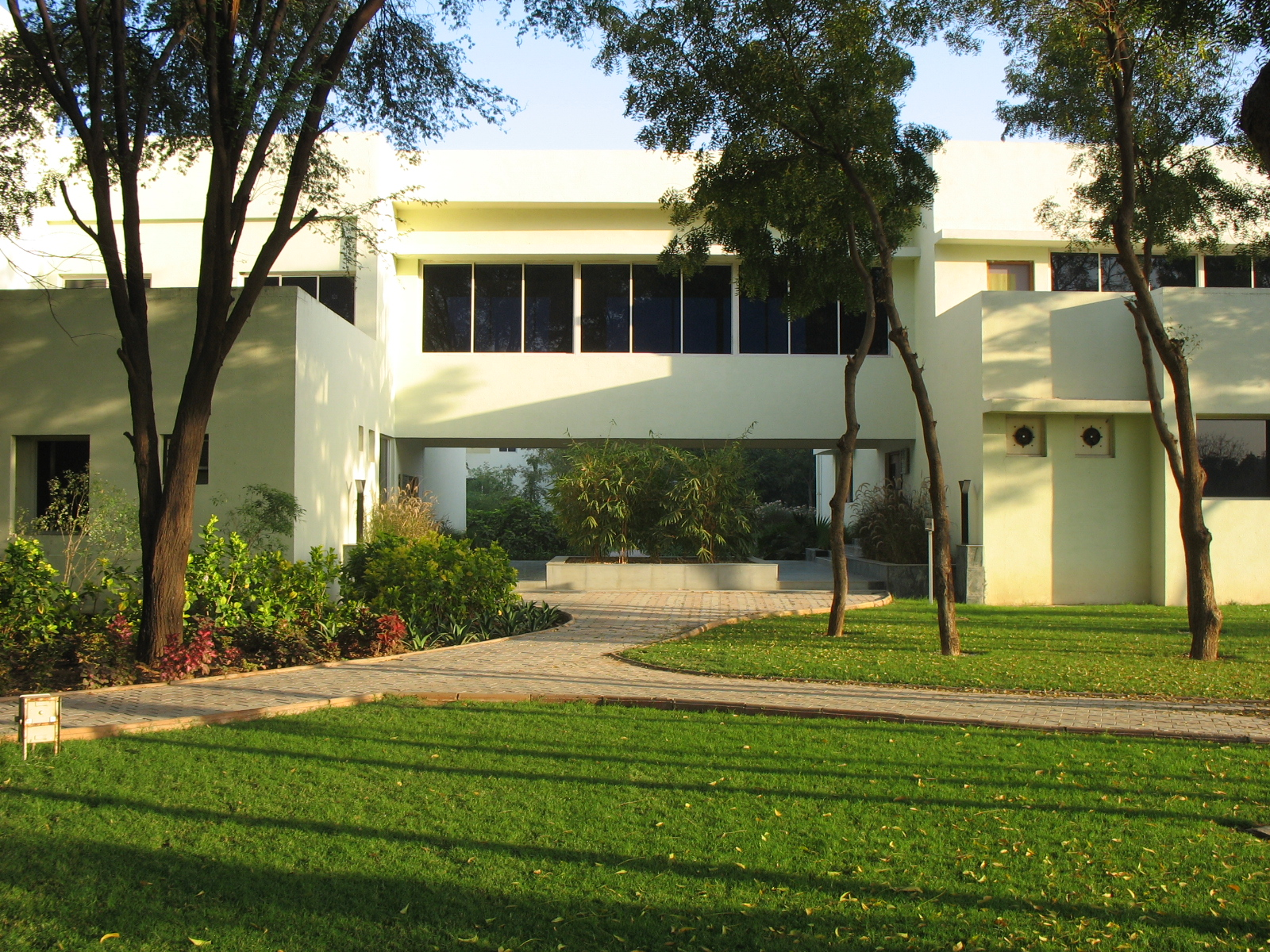
Resource centre in Dhirubhai Ambani University, one of the nine private universities in Gujarat

As of 2025, Gujarat is home to over 70 universities, including 2 central universities, 27 state universities, 2 deemed universities, and more than 35 private universities.

=== Central Universities ===
University	Location	Established	Specialization	Sources
Central University of Gujarat	Vadodara	2009	General	
Gati Shakti Vishwavidyalaya	Vadodara	2018	Railway & Transport	

=== Institute of National Importance ===
Institutes	Location	Type	Established	Specialization	Sources
All India Institute of Medical Sciences, Rajkot	Rajkot	Autonomous	2020	Medical	
Indian Institute of Information Technology, Surat	Surat	Autonomous	2017	Engineering/IT	
Indian Institute of Information Technology, Vadodara	Vadodara	Autonomous	2013	Engineering/IT	
Indian Institute of Management, Ahmedabad	Ahmedabad	Autonomous	1961	Social Sciences and Management	
Indian Institute of Technology, Gandhinagar	Gandhinagar	Autonomous	2008	Science and Engineering	
National Forensic Sciences University	Gandhinagar	Autonomous	2020	Forensic sciences & criminology	
National Institute of Design, Ahmedabad	Ahmedabad, Gandhinagar	Autonomous	1961	Design	
National Institute of Pharmaceutical Education and Research, Ahmedabad	Ahmedabad	Autonomous	2007	Pharmaceutical education	
Sardar Vallabhbhai National Institute of Technology, Surat	Surat	Autonomous	1961	Engineering & Technology	
Institute of Teaching and Research in Ayurveda, Jamnagar	Jamnagar	Autonomous	2020	Ayurveda	
Rashtriya Raksha University	Gandhinagar district	Autonomous	2020	Police, Internal Security & Defence-Studies	
Tribhuvan Sahkari University	Anand District	Autonomous	2022	Cooperation	

=== State Universities ===
University	Location	Established	Specialization	Sources
Anand Agricultural University	Anand	2004	Agriculture	
Bhakta Kavi Narsinh Mehta University	Junagadh	2015	General	
Birsa Munda Tribal University	Rajpipla, Narmada district	2017	General	
Children’s Research University	Gandhinagar	2009	Children's Education	
Dr. Babasaheb Ambedkar Open University	Ahmedabad	1994	General	
Gujarat Biotechnology University	Gift City	2018	Biotechnology	[38]
Gujarat University	Ahmedabad	1949	General	
Gujarat Ayurved University	Jamnagar	1967	Ayurveda	
Gujarat Technological University	Ahmedabad	2007	Engineering, Management, Pharmacy	
Hemchandracharya North Gujarat University	Patan	1986	General	
Indian Institute of Teacher Education	Gandhinagar	2010	Teacher Education	
Junagadh Agricultural University	Junagadh	2004	Agriculture	
Kamdhenu University	Gandhinagar	2009	Dairy Technology	
Krantiguru Shyamji Krishna Verma Kachchh University	Bhuj	2003	General	
Maharaja Krishnakumarsinhji Bhavnagar University	Bhavnagar	1978	General	
Maharaja Sayajirao University of Baroda	Vadodara	1881	General	
Navsari Agricultural University	Navsari	2004	Agriculture	
Sardar Patel University	Vallabh Vidyanagar	1955	General	
Sardarkrushinagar Dantiwada Agricultural University	Palanpur	1972	Agriculture	
Saurashtra University	Rajkot	1967	General	
Shri Govind Guru University	Godhra	2015	General	
Shree Somnath Sanskrit University	Veraval	2005	Sanskrit Studies	
Swarnim Gujarat Sports University	Gandhinagar	2011	Sports Science	
Veer Narmad South Gujarat University	Surat	1965	General	
Kaushalya Skill University	Ahmedabad	2021	Skill Development	

=== Deemed ===
Deemed universities
University	Location	Established	Specialization	Sources
Gujarat Vidyapith	Ahmedabad	1920	General	
Sumandeep Vidyapeeth	Pipalia, Waghodia, Vadodara	2007	Dental, Medical, Management	

=== Private ===
Private universities
University	Location	Established	Specialization	Sources
Ahmedabad University	Ahmedabad	2009	General	
Auro University	Surat	2011	Management, hospitality, law, IT, fashion, interior, mass communication	
CEPT University	Ahmedabad	2005	Architecture, Design, Planning, Construction Technology, Management	
Charotar University of Science and Technology	Anand	2009	Science, technology	
Dharamsinh Desai University	Nadiad	1968	Technology	
Dhirubhai Ambani University	Gandhinagar	2001	Technology	
Ganpat University	Mehsana	2005	General	
Gandhinagar University	Gandhinagar	2023	Engineering, Management, Design, Valuation, Pharmacy, Law	
Indus University	Ahmedabad	2006	Technology	
Kadi Sarva Vishwavidyalaya	Gandhinagar	2007	General	
C. U. Shah University	Surendranagar	2013	Engineering, Arts, Commerce, Computer Science, Nursing, Pharmacy, Education, Social Work, Science, Management, Law Faculties	www.cushahuniversity.ac.in
Marwadi University, Rajkot	Rajkot	2016	Engineering, Arts, Commerce, Science, Management, Law Faculties	
Nirma University of Science and Technology	Ahmedabad	1998	Technology, Management, Law, Architecture	
P P Savani University	Surat	2016	School of Engineering, School of Science, School of physiotherapy, School of Nursing, School of Liberal Arts and Management, School of Design, School of Architecture	
Pandit Deendayal Energy University (PDEU)	Gandhinagar	2007	Energy, Engineering & Technology, Management, Sciences, Liberal Studies, Law,	
Parul University	Vadodara	2015	General	
Rai University	Ahmedabad	2011	General	
GLS University	Ahmedabad	2015	Management, Computer	
RK University	Rajkot	2005	School of Engineering, school of science, school of physiotherapy, School of Computer Science, School of Management, School of Diploma Studies	
Uka Tarsadia University	Bardoli	2011	General	
Silver Oak University	Ahmedabad	2019	General	www.silveroakuni.ac.in

=== Commerce, Management and technology ===
- A. D. Patel Institute of Technology, Vallabh Vidyanagar
- Adani Institute of Infrastructure Management, Ahmedabad
- B.K. School of Business Management, Ahmedabad
- Birla Vishwakarma Mahavidyalaya, Anand
- C K Pithawala College of Engineering and Technology, Surat
- C. U. Shah College of Engineering and Technology, Surendranagar
- G H Patel College Of Engineering & Technology, Vallabh Vidyanagar
- Government Engineering College, Bhavnagar
- Government Engineering College, Bhuj
- Government Engineering College, Dahod
- Government Engineering College, Gandhinagar
- Government Engineering College, Patan
- Hasmukh Goswami College of Engineering, Ahmedabad
- International Institute of Management and Technical Studies, Ahmedabad
- K.S. School of Business Management, Ahmedabad
- Karnavati University, Ahmedabad
- KN University, Sanand, Ahmedabad
- L. J. Institute of Management Studies, Ahmedabad
- L.J. Institute of Engineering & Technology, Ahmedabad
- LDRP Institute of Technology and Research, Gandhinagar
- Lalbhai Dalpatbhai College of Engineering, Ahmedabad
- Lokbharati University for Rural Innovation, Sanosara
- Lukhdhirji Engineering College, Morbi
- Narnarayan Shastri Institute of Technology, Ahmedabad
- National Institute of Mass Communication and Journalism - NIMCJ, Ahmedabad
- Parul Institute of Engineering and Technology, Vadodara
- PDM College of Commerce, Rajkot
- Rajju Shroff ROFEL University, Vapi
- Sardar Vallabhbhai Global University, Ahmedabad
- Sardar Vallabhbhai Patel Institute of Technology, Vasad
- Sarvajanik College of Engineering and Technology, Surat
- Shantilal Shah Engineering College, Sidsar, Bhavnagar
- Sigma University, Vadodara
- Silver Oak College of Engineering and Technology, Ahmedabad
- St. Xavier's College, Ahmedabad
- Times Business School, Bodakdev, Ahmedabad
- TransStadia University, Ahmedabad
- U. V. Patel College of Engineering, Mehsana
- Unitedworld School of Business, Ahmedabad
- Vishwakarma Government Engineering College, Gandhinagar
- Gyanmanjari Innovative University, Bhavnagar
- Narayana Business School, Sanathal, Ahmedabad

=== Medical colleges ===
- All India Institute of Medical Sciences, Rajkot
- Atkot Medical College & Research Centre, Atkot
- B. J. Medical College, Ahmedabad
- Banas Medical College and Research Institute, Palanpur
- C.U. Shah Medical College, Surendranagar
- Dr Kiran C. Patel Medical College & Research Institute, Bharuch
- Dr. M.K. Shah Medical College and Research Centre, Ahmedabad
- Dr. N. D. Desai Faculty of Medical Science & Research, Nadiad
- ESIC Medical College, Ahmedabad
- GCS Medical College and Research Center, Ahmedabad
- GMERS Medical College, Dharpur, Patan
- GMERS Medical College, Gandhinagar
- GMERS Medical College, Gotri, Vadodara
- GMERS Medical College, Himmatnagar
- GMERS Medical College, Junagadh
- GMERS Medical College, Porbandar
- GMERS Medical College, Sola
- GMERS Medical College, Vadnagar
- GMERS Medical College, Valsad
- Government Medical College, Bhavnagar
- Government Medical College, Surat
- Gujarat Adani Institute of Medical Sciences, Bhuj
- Medical College Baroda
- M. P. Shah Medical College, Jamnagar
- Narendra Modi Medical College, Ahmedabad
- Nootan Medical College and Research Centre, Visnagar
- Pandit Deendayal Upadhyay Medical College, Rajkot
- Parul Institute of Medical Science and Research, Vadodara
- Pramukh Swami Medical College, Karamsad
- Shantabaa Medical College, Amreli
- Smt. NHL Municipal Medical College, Ahmedabad
- Surat Municipal Institute of Medical Education and Research, Surat
- Swaminarayan Institute of Medical Sciences and Research, Kalol
- Zydus Medical College and Hospital, Dahod

== Autonomous institutes ==
Institute	Location
Birla Vishwakarma Mahavidyalaya	Anand
Indian Institute of Management, Ahmedabad	Ahmedabad
Institute of Infrastructure Technology Research and Management	Ahmedabad
Institute of Rural Management	Anand
MICA	Ahmedabad
National Institute of Fashion Technology	Gandhinagar
National Institute of Pharmaceutical Education and Research	Ahmedabad
National Institute of Design	Ahmedabad
Indian Institute of Information Technology, Vadodara	Vadodara
Indian Institute of Information Technology, Surat	Surat
Indian Institute of Technology Gandhinagar	Gandhinagar
International Institute of Management and Technical Studies	Ahmedabad
Sardar Vallabhbhai National Institute of Technology	Surat

== Research organizations ==
- Ahmedabad Textile Industry's Research Association, Ahmedabad
- Bhaskaracharya Institute For Space Applications and Geo-Informatics, Gandhinagar
- Central Salt and Marine Chemicals Research Institute, Bhavnagar
- Institute for Plasma Research, Gandhinagar
- Physical Research Laboratory, Ahmedabad

== See also ==
- Education in Gujarat
- Education in Ahmedabad
