= List of educational institutions in Ahmedabad =

This is a list of educational institutes in the city of Ahmedabad, India. Most of the colleges in Ahmedabad are affiliated to the Gujarat University and are spread throughout the city as well as the suburbs. The schools are governed by the Gujarat Secondary and Higher Secondary Education Board.

== Engineering colleges ==
- L.J. Institute of Engineering & Technology
- Lalbhai Dalpatbhai College of Engineering
- Institute of Technology, Nirma University
- Vishwakarma Government Engineering College
- Ahmedabad Institute of Technology
- Ahmedabad University-School of Engineering & Applied Science
- SAL engineering and technical institute
- School of Engineering and Applied Science

== Journalism Institute ==
- Times Business School
- National Institute of Mass Communication and Journalism - NIMCJ

== Management Institutes ==
- Ahmedabad Management Association
- B. K. Majumdar Institute of Business Management now Ahmedabad University
- B.K. School of Business Management
- Indian Institute of Management Ahmedabad
- Institute of Management, Nirma University
- LJ Institute of Business Administration
- Adani Institute of Infrastructure Management
- MICA
- Narayana Business School (NBS)

== Medical colleges ==
- B.J. Medical College
- Public Health Foundation of India
- AMC Dental College
- Smt. NHL Municipal Medical College

== Pharmacy colleges ==
- L. M. College of Pharmacy
- Institute of Pharmacy, Nirma University
- L.J. Institute of Pharmacy

== Science colleges ==
- Gujarat College
- St. Xavier's College, Ahmedabad
- Institute of Science, Nirma University

== High schools ==
- Shanti Asiatic school
- Shree Sardar Patel & Swami Vivekanand School
- A. G. High School
- Ankur Hindi High School
- Ahmedabad International School
- Calorx Olive International School
- Calorx Public School, Ghatlodia
- Brighton school, Danilimda
- Brighton Public school, Juhapura
- Diwan-Ballubhai School
- Delhi Public School, Bopal
- H. B. Kapadia New High School
- Delhi Public School, East
- Kendriya Vidyalaya Shahibaugh
- Kendriya Vidyalaya Army Cantonment, Ahmedabad
- Kendriya Vidyalaya ONGC Ahmedabad
- Kendriya Vidyalaya Sabarmati, Ahmedabad
- Kendriya Vidyalaya SAC Ahmedabad
- Maharaja Agrasen Vidyalaya
- Seventh Day Adventist Higher Secondary School
- Sheth C. N. Vidyalaya
- St. Xavier's High School
- St. Xavier's High School Loyola Hall
- The Riverside School, Ahmedabad
- Udgam School for Children

== See also ==
- Ahmedabad Education Society
