= Education in Gujarat =

Education in the State of Gujarat, India

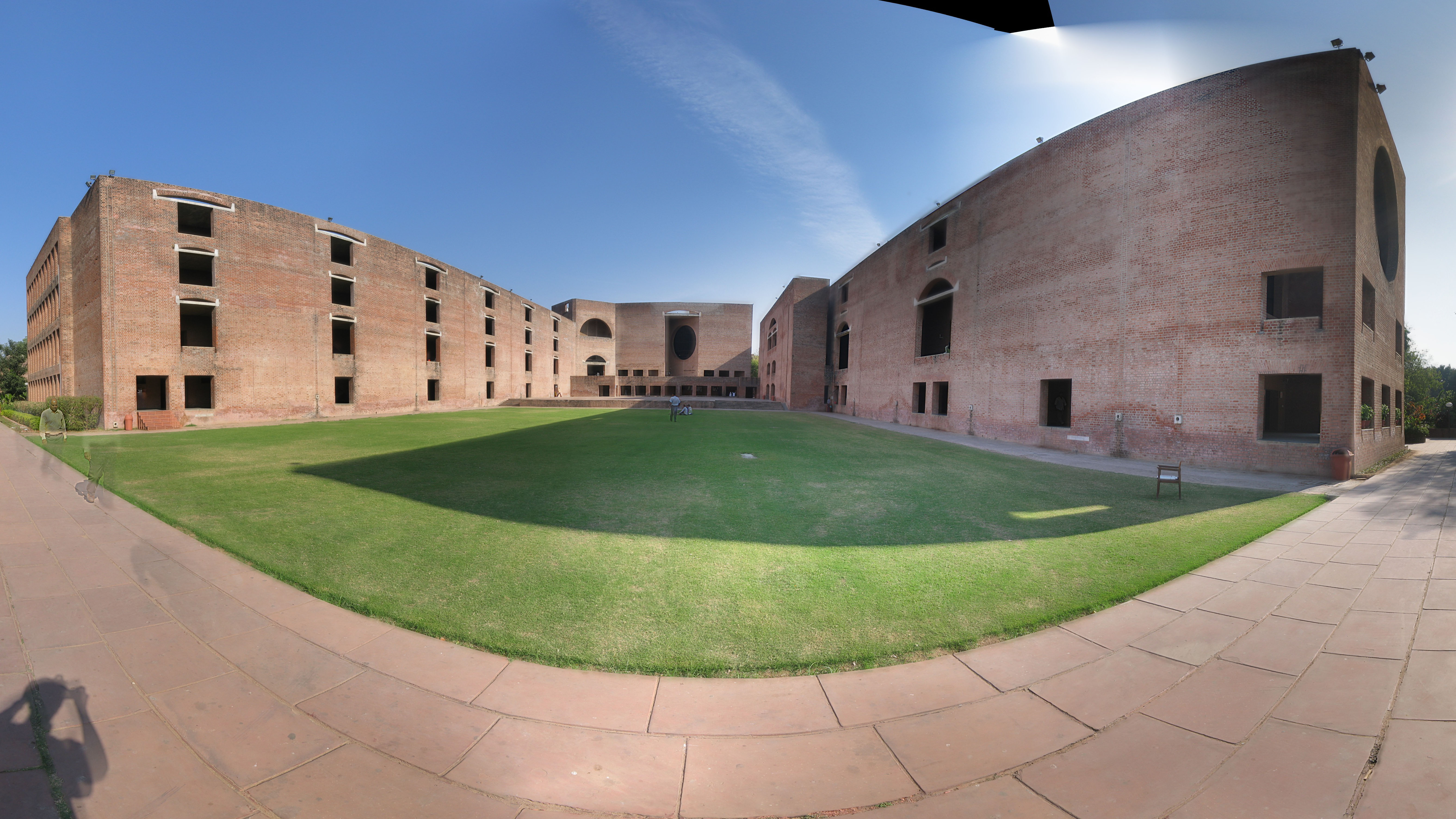
Indian Institute of Management Ahmedabad, a business school and one of the seven prestigious IIMs

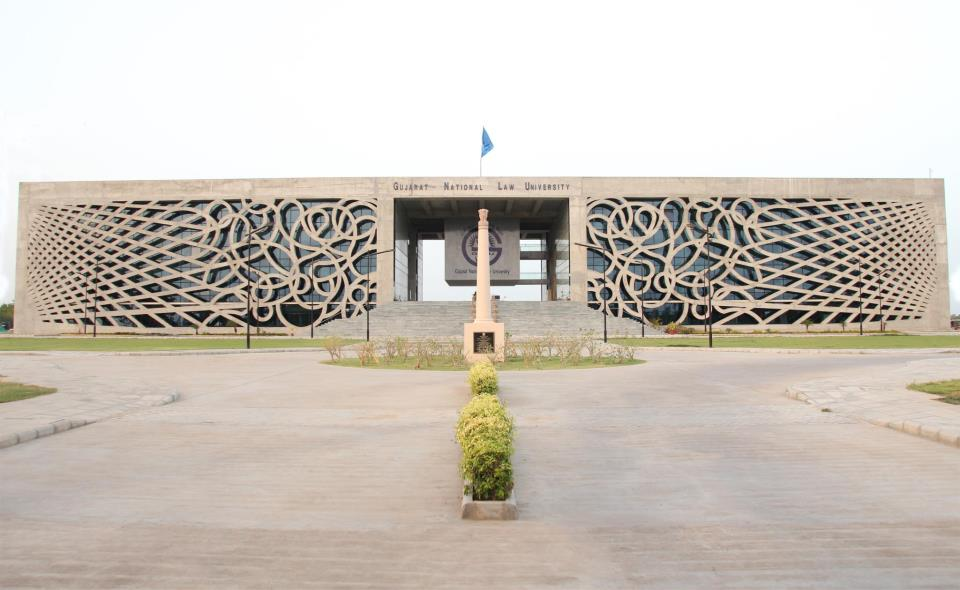
The Gujarat National Law University, Gandhinagar

Gujarat is a state situated in the western part of India and shares its northwestern boundary with Pakistan. Rajasthan, Madhya Pradesh and Maharashtra are the neighboring states of Gujarat. Gandhinagar is the capital city of the state and Ahmedabad is its largest city and the main commercial hub of the region. Gujarat houses a wide variety of industries and is considered one among the best industrialized states of the nation. Gujarat is also home to some of the prestigious educational institutes of the nation.

The education department of the state pays special attention to the improvement of elementary education in Gujarat. The state government has also launched the district primary education program for making primary education compulsory and free for all students up to a certain age limit. It has also taken up several measures for checking the rate of dropout at schools in Gujarat. The same uniform structure of 10+2 education is followed in the schools of Gujarat.

== Gujarat Secondary and Higher Secondary Education Board ==
The Gujarat Secondary and Higher Secondary Education Board was constituted in 1972, following the enactment of the Gujarat Secondary Education Act 1972. Its chairman and deputy chairman are appointed by the state government. It has 16 ex officio members, and 44 other members drawn from academic organizations, legislative bodies and civil society. Various Committees with specific responsibilities function under the board, such as the executive committee, examination committee, finance committee, education committee, and magazine advisory committee.

The board provides the state government guidance about the policies governing secondary education, its development and qualitative enhancement. In an overview, its duties are:

- Preparing the curricula and syllabi
- Registering new Secondary schools and monitoring their performance on a continual basis
- Providing developmental guidance
- Organising training for teachers and principals-up measures (for instance, to integrate Gujarat's students with the Information Technology-enabled global village, the Board has introduced Computer Studies among regular curricula).

== School education ==
Both private and government schools operate here in Gujarat. One can also come across schools run by several municipal corporations and trusts in Ahmadabad.

Gujarat Secondary and Higher Secondary Education Board are in charge of the schools run by the state government. However, many of the private schools in Gujarat are affiliated to the Central Board of Secondary Education (CBSE) and Council for the Indian School Certificate Examination (CISCE) board. Gujarati is the main medium of instruction in the state-run schools while the schools run by other boards use English as their medium of study. The government of Gujarat also gives special importance to education of women in India in the state.

== Higher education ==
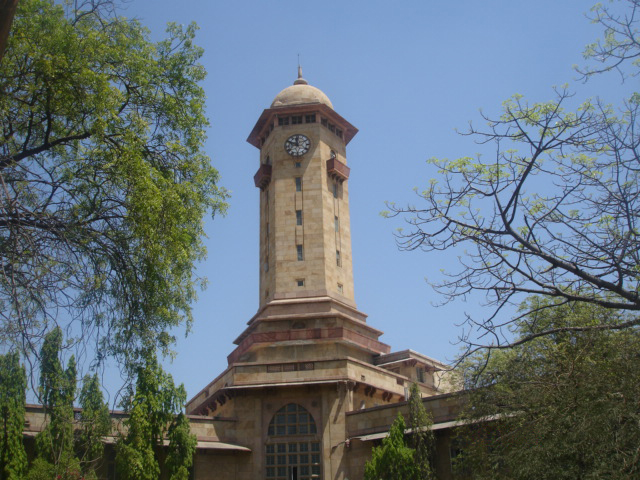
The clock tower in Gujarat University, Ahmedabad

There are several universities functioning in Gujarat which offers both undergraduate and postgraduate programs in various disciplines.

The Maharaja Sayajirao University of Baroda is the only English medium university in Gujarat. It was ranked by India Today at the Tenth Place in its list of India's Best Universities (Aug 2011 Issue); while Hindustan Times ranked it at the sixth place.

Apart from it, Gujarat University, Sardar Patel University, Saurashtra University, Veer Narmad South Gujarat University, Hemchandracharya North Gujarat University, Bhavnagar University and Kachchh University are the leading State Universities.

The four agricultural universities in Gujarat are especially devoted to the study of agriculture and other subjects related to it.

Apart from these, Indian Institute of Technology Gandhinagar, Indian Institute of Management Ahmedabad, Sardar Vallabhbhai National Institute of Technology, Surat, Institute of Infrastructure, Technology, Research and Management and National Institute of Design, Ahmedabad are some of the other prestigious centers of higher learning in Gujarat.

The state also has some of the best engineering institutes in India like Sardar Vallabhbhai Patel Institute of Technology, Dhirubhai Ambani Institute of Information and Communication Technology among others.

Central Salt and Marine Chemicals Research Institute is another reputed institute operating in Gujarat and does various research works on inland lake salt, marine salt and sub-soil brine.

In the emerging area of legal education, a premier institution Gujarat National Law University was founded in the capital city Gandhinagar which started imparting education from the year 2004 and is ranked in top institutions in the country.

Indian Institute of Public Health Gandhinagar University is the first public health university of India, Launched by Public Health Foundation of India, it aims to strengthen the overall health system in the country through education, training, research, and advocacy/policy initiatives. Moreover Gujarat also has AIIMS Rajkot in the field of medical science.

== Study in Gujarat ==
To promote Gujarat as an Education Hub of India, The Gujarat Government's Department of Higher and Technical Education started Study in Gujarat Initiative. The officials are going to have roadshows nationally and internationally destinations.

The department will hold the roadshows in Patna, Ranchi, Indore, Kolkata, Hyderabad, Guwahati, and Nasik. On the International front, the department will host roads shows at Kuwait City in Kuwait, Dubai in UAE, Muscat in Oman, and Riyadh in Saudi Arabia and also at some African cities.

== See also ==
- List of educational institutions in Gujarat
