= Umesh Upadhyay =

Indian journalist and author (1958–2024)

- Born: 26 August 1958; Mathura, Uttar Pradesh, India
- Died: 1 September 2024 (aged 66); New Delhi, Delhi, India
- Education: Delhi University (DU), Jawaharlal Nehru University (JNU), Film and Television Institute of India (FTII)
- Occupations: Journalist; author
- Title: Former President & Media Director of Reliance Industries

Umesh Upadhyay (26 August 1958 – 1 September 2024) was an Indian television journalist, author and media executive. Critics say that his book “Western Media Narratives on India – Gandhi to Modi” exposes the dubiousness of the anti-India agenda of the foreign media. He was also a freelance writer, an independent media consultant and analyst. Earlier he worked as president and director of media at Reliance Industries Limited, prior to which he was President of News at Network 18.

== Early life and career ==
During his over 25 year long career in media and academics, Upadhyay was channel head at Janmat TV; executive producer and output editor for Zee News; executive producer at Home TV; correspondent for Doordarshan; and sub editor at Press Trust of India. He also worked at SAB TV. He started his career as a lecturer at Delhi University, has been a political analyst and commentator with All India Radio (AIR), and is a member of the Editors Guild of India.

Upadhyay held a senior position in the academic field as director of the Disha Education Society in Raipur. He managed affairs of the Disha Group of Institutions, and was designated as Pro VC of the upcoming Disha University. Upadhyay has been nominated by the Indian government to the Executive Council of the Indian Institute of Mass Communications. Upadhyay was also a member of the jury for the Narad Jayanti Awards in New Delhi.

Upadhyay was an executive board member for the National Institute of Open Schools, an autonomous institution under the Indian government's Ministry of Human Resources Development, and the largest open schooling system in the world. Upadhyay was also a member of the search committee to select a new Vice Chancellor for the Makhan Lal National University of Journalism and Mass Communication of Bhopal.

== Education ==
Upadhyay was an alumnus of Jawaharlal Nehru University (JNU) and the University of Delhi. He did his Masters and M.Phil at the School of International Studies, JNU, and has served as a member of the Academic Council of Delhi University. He was trained at the Film and Television Institute of India, Pune, Asian Institute for Broadcasting Development (Kuala Lumpur), BSkyB (London), Thames Studios (UK), and CPC (Delhi).

== Public speaker ==
- He was also a public speaker and an expert on media issues.
- Upadhyay has given a TED Talk, which can be watched on YouTube.
- Upadhyay was a regular commentator on current national/international issues.

== Death ==
On September 1, 2024, Upadhyay fell two storeys from a residential building in Vasant Kunj as the building was getting renovated, and was pronounced dead at the hospital from his injuries, at the age of 66.

== Awards and memberships ==
Upadhyay was awarded the Ganesh Shankar Vidyarthi Award for lifetime contributions in the field of Journalism and Media.

Upadhyay was a member of: the Management Committee and Executive Council of Makhanlal Chaturvedi National University for Mass Communication and Journalism, Bhopal; the Advisory Council of the National Institute of Mass Communication and Journalism, Ahmedabad; the IIMC Society; the Executive Council of the Indian Institute of Mass Communication, New Delhi; and the Executive Board of the National Open School Society of India (NOS).
