= Silver Oak =

Silver Oak may refer to:

- Grevillea robusta, a tree not closely related to the true oaks, Quercus, native to eastern coastal Australia
- Brachylaena discolor, a flowering plant in the aster family
- Silver Oak Cellars
- Silver Oak College of Engineering and Technology, Ahmedabad, Gujarat, India
