= AMC Dental College =

School of dentistry in Ahmedabad, India

Coordinates: 23.0053°N 72.6124°E

A M C Dental College
- Established: 2009
- Dean: Dr. Dolly Patel
- Location: Ahmedabad, Gujarat, India
- Campus: Urban
- Website: amcdentalcollege.edu.in

AMC Dental College is a dental college in Khokhra (Maninagar east), Ahmedabad, India. It is affiliated to Gujarat University and approved by the Dental Council of India. It opened in 2010.

== History ==
AMC Dental College was established in 2009 by AMC Medical Education Trust and was inaugurated in April 2010 by Gujarat Chief Minister Narendra Modi in Khokhra, which falls under his assembly constituency, Maninagar.
