= Mary Logan Reddick =

Neuroembryologist

- Born: Mary Reddick; December 31, 1914; Atlanta, Georgia, U.S.
- Died: October 1, 1966 (aged 51)
- Education: Spelman College; Radcliffe College, Harvard University; Cambridge University
- Scientific career
- Fields: Neuroembryology; Biology
- Workplaces: Morehouse College; University of Atlanta
- Thesis: The differentiation of embryo chick medulla in chorioallantoic grafts (1944)

Mary Logan Reddick (December 31, 1914 – October 1, 1966) was an American neuroembryologist who earned her PhD from Radcliffe College, Harvard University in 1944. She was a full professor, first at Morehouse College, and then at the University of Atlanta from 1953 to her death. Her doctoral dissertation was on the study of chick embryos, and she went on to do research with time-lapse microscopy (then called motion picture microphotography) in tissue cultures.

In 1952, Reddick received a Ford science fellowship to study at Cambridge University. Reddick was possibly the first African-American woman scientist to receive this fellowship for study abroad, and she was the first female biology instructor at Morehouse College.

== Early life and education ==
Mary Reddick was born in Atlanta, Georgia in 1914. She graduated from the Laboratory High School and started majoring in biology at Spelman College in 1929 at the age of 15. Spelman is a women's historically black college, affiliated with the University of Atlanta and Morehouse College. This affiliation enabled her to study with an African-American scientist at Morehouse, Samuel Milton Nabrit. Her senior faculty at Spelman were both white female biologists.

Reddick assisted in labs for four years after completing her bachelor's degree in science at Spelman. She was awarded her bachelor's degree in 1935.

In 1937, she received a Rockefeller Foundation General Education Board Fellowship, enabling her to gain a Masters of Science degree from the University of Atlanta, with a thesis studying the embryo chick blastoderm.

== Career and postgraduate education ==
After gaining her Masters, Reddick began teaching biology at Spelman in 1937. She became the first female biology instructor at Morehouse College in 1939.

In 1942, Reddick was awarded a second Rockefeller education fellowship by Radcliffe College, the women's coordinate for Harvard University at that time. Reddick studied techniques for transplanting tissues and nerve cell differentiation in chick embryos there for two years, gaining a second master's degree in biology in 1943 and being awarded a PhD in 1944. Her doctoral dissertation was titled The differentiation of embryonic chick medulla in chorioallantoic grafts. She was elected to the Phi Beta Kappa and Sigma Xi honour societies. Geraldine Pittman Woods was a classmate. Reddick was the 10th member of Morehouse faculty to earn a doctorate.

Reddick returned to Morehouse, and became the first female to act as chair of the biology department, later promoted to full professor.

In 1952, Reddick was possibly the first African-American woman to receive a Ford Foundation science fellowship to study abroad, studying embryology at the School of Anatomy at Cambridge University. She returned to the US in 1953, and joined the faculty at the University of Atlanta, with the rank of full professor and named chair of the biology department. During the 1950s and 1960s she supervised the research of more than 20 students, including Luther Williams. She also gained a research grant from the National Science Foundation. She held the position of Professor there until her death at the age of 51 in 1966.

== Embryological research ==
Reddick began her embryogenesis studies using the developing chicken embryo, specifically White Leghorns and Rhode Island Reds. The larger question she addressed was what the developmental potential was of portions of the early chick blastoderm, when transplanted to the chorioallantoic membrane of a chick in a later stage of development, in "cut-and-paste" experiments. These "cut-and-paste" experiments supported the hypothesis that the node is necessary and sufficient for specifying differentiation of many derivatives of ectoderm, mesoderm, and endoderm, but not all. For instance, any cases of liver tissue development that she observed only occurred where there was heart tissue nearby.

For her dissertation work at Radcliffe, Reddick studied neurodevelopment of the chick medulla. For these experiments, she used embryos from Plymouth Rock chickens. The goal of her experiments was to understand how much of that area of the brain was already determined and how much was dependent on interactions with surrounding developing tissues, such as notochord, somites, and ectoderm. The results of these experiments supported the hypothesis that while some aspects of the post-otic medulla in chick have already been determined, there needs to be a continuous interaction with surrounding developing tissues.

Subsequent work addressed several technical problems in assessing cell differentiation. For these experiments, Reddick used White Plymouth Rock chicken embryos. One of the questions she addressed was whether nerve cells in the post-otic chick medulla became syncytial during development. To try to get single developing nerve cells with long processes visible in one plane of focus under the microscope, Reddick used a "smear" technique of flattening tissue before fixing and staining it. She also found that what had been thought of as two different cell types, was actually one cell type in different phases of the cell cycle. Some of the cells were mitotic, and others were in the interphase.

== Publications ==
- Reddick ML (1937). The differentiation of portions of the chick blastoderm in chorio-allantoic grafts. Thesis for Degree of the Masters of Science, University of Atlanta.
- Reddick ML (1944). The differentiation of embryo chick medulla in chorioallantoic grafts. Dissertation, Radcliffe College, Harvard University.
- Reddick ML (1945). The differentiation of embryonic chick medulla in chorioallantoic grafts. Journal of Comparative Neurology.
- Reddick ML (1951). Histogenesis of the cellular elements in the postotic medulla of the chick embryo. The Anatomical Record: Advances in Integrative Anatomy and Evolutionary Biology.
