= Palladium Ahmedabad =

Shopping mall in Ahmedabad, India

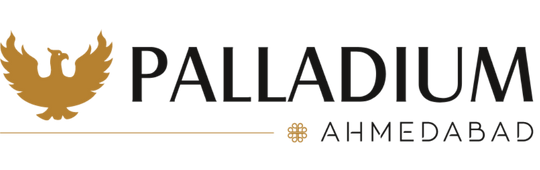

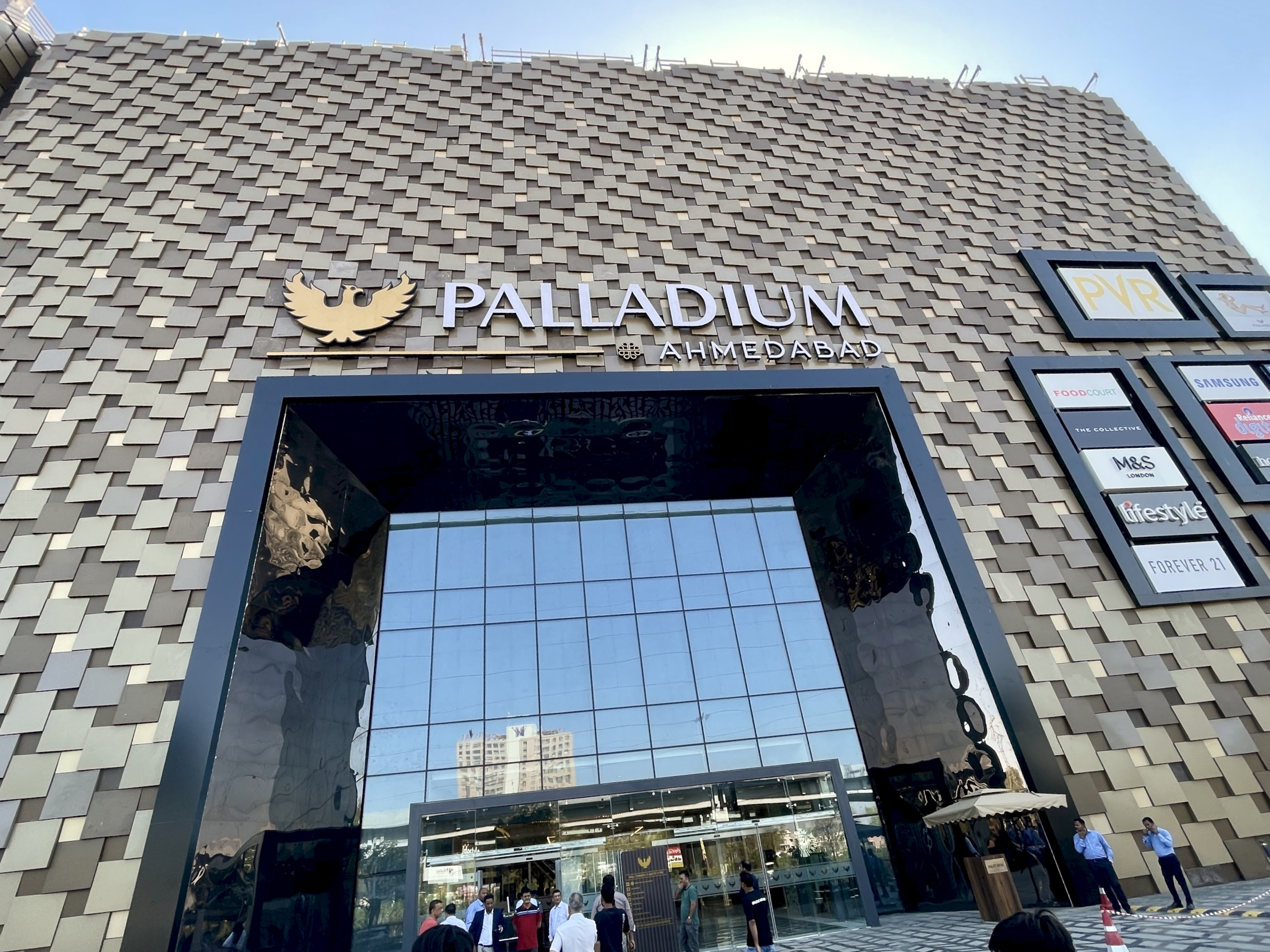
- Location: Ahmedabad, Gujarat, India
- Coordinates: 22°59′57″N 72°30′05″E
- Address: Sarkhej–Gandhinagar Highway, Thaltej
- Opened: 26 February 2023; 3 years ago
- Developer: Phoenix Mills Ltd. and B Safal Group (joint venture)
- Owner: Phoenix Mills Ltd. (via joint venture with B Safal Group)
- Num. of stores: 220
- Floor area: 750,000 square feet (70,000 m^{2})
- Floors: 6
- Parking: Multilevel
- Website: palladiumahmedabad.com

Palladium Ahmedabad (popularly called Phoenix Palladium Ahmedabad) is a shopping mall in Ahmedabad, Gujarat, India. It is owned by Phoenix Mills Ltd and it was opened on 26 February 2023.

The mall is located in Thaltej on the Sarkhej-Gandhinagar Highway and is split into 6 floors with a dedicated area of 7,534 sq.ft.

== Amenities ==
=== Brands ===
- The mall is home to several multinational and international brands like Pantaloons, Max, Armani Exchange, Zudio, Lifestyle, Bata, Crocs, and many other 149 brands

=== Cinema ===
- The mall features a 9-screen PVR multiplex.
