= Indian Institute of Teacher Education =

State university in Gujarat, India

- भारतीय शिक्षक प्रशिक्षण संस्थान
- Other names: IITE, TEACHERS UNIVERSITY
- Motto: "न हि ज्ञानेन सदृशं पवित्रमिह विद्यते"
- Type: State university
- Established: 2010
- Accreditation: NAAC
- Affiliations: UGC
- Chancellor: Governor of Gujarat
- Vice-Chancellor: Dr. Mukesh Patel
- Registrar: Jatin Bhatt
- Location: Gandhinagar, Gujarat, 382016, India
- Campus: 12 acres (520,000 ft^{2}); Urban
- Language: English
- Website: www.iite.ac.in

The Indian Institute of Teacher Education (IITE) is a state university located at Gandhinagar, Gujarat, India. It was established in 2010 by the Government of Gujarat and focuses on teacher education.

== History ==
With a vision of exporting teachers from India, Narendra Modi, serving as Chief Minister of Gujarat from 2001 to 2014, was the main proponent of the institute. The curriculum was designed by a team of experts led by Kireet Joshi. The institute was established by an act of the Government of Gujarat in 2010.

== Programme detail ==
A. UG Teacher Education Programmes

• 4 year integrated B.Sc.-B.Ed.

• 4 year integrated B.A.-B.Ed.

• 2 year B.Ed. (at Affiliated colleges)

B. PG Teacher Education Programmes

• 3 year integrated innovative M.Sc./M.A.-M.Ed.

• 3 year integrated B.Ed.-M.Ed.

• 2 year M.Ed. (at Affiliated colleges)

C. Research Programmes in Education

• Ph.D.

== Admission process ==
• Admission to UG and PG Programmes

o All eligible candidates shall have to appear in i3T – Integrated Test for Teacher Trainee conducted by the Indian Institute of Teacher Education (IITE) as per schedule mentioned in admission brochure.

o To qualify in the i3T, the candidate will have to secure minimum 50% marks in the i3T.

o Admission to all UG and PG programmes will be given as per merit list prepared based on marks of i3T only.

== See also ==
List of institutions of higher education in Gujarat
