= International Institute of Management and Technical Studies =

International Institute of Management and Technical Studies (IIMT STUDIES)
- Founder: Bharti Lokseva Charitable Trust
- Established: 2009
- Chair: Manoj R. Thakkar
- Location: Ahmedabad, Mumbai, London and Surat, Gujarat State, India
- Website: iimtstudies.edu.in

International Institute of Management and Technical Studies (IIMT STUDIES) is an Indian-based educational outfit offering e-learning and distance education to working professionals.

== History ==
International Institute of Management and Technical Studies (IIMT Studies) was founded in 2009 by “Bharti Lokseva Charitable Trust” with its head office located in Ahmedabad, India. The institute is registered under the Bombay Public Trusts act of the Government of India.

IIMT Studies has branches in Ahmedabad, Mumbai and Surat, Gujarat State. It also has an extended international arm in London, United Kingdom.

In 2017, IIMT Studies launched a book for the HR professionals, known as the "HRishta".

== Academics ==
=== Accreditation and affiliations ===
IIMT Studies is accredited by the British Accreditation Council of the UK as an Open and Blended learning Provider.

IIMT Studies is affiliated with the Gujarat University for short certification courses. It is also affiliated to the Institution of Engineers, Gujarat State Certer and European Association for Distance Learning.

=== Partnerships ===
IIMT Studies is a partner institute of the Directorate of Employment and Training for Conducting Virtual Classes and Gujarat Knowledge Society, Department of Technical Education, Government of India.

IIMT Studies also has its tie-up with the Maharaja Sayajirao University of Vadodara.

=== Courses ===
IIMT Studies offers e-learning and part time certificate courses to working professionals who do not have much time to spend for studies.

The institute offers diploma and postgraduate courses in affiliation with the Institution of Engineers, Gujarat State centre. It offers courses with the HRDC-UGC of the Kumaun University of Nainital. It also offers its courses in Gulf Countries such as Dubai and Kuwait.

IIMT Studies runs the government institute ITI Vadagam (Dhansura) and offers short certificate courses.

=== Awards and recognition ===
- 2019 - IIMT Studies Ltd, UK received an award from the World Education Summit for Innovation in eLearning and Blended Learning.

== See also ==
- Distance education
- E-learning (theory)
- European Association for Distance Learning
- Bharati Vidyapeeth Institute Of Management and Research
- All India Council for Technical Education
