= Narendra Modi Medical College =

Medical college In Ahmedabad, India

Coordinates: 22°59′54″N 72°36′16″E

- Former name: Ahmedabad Municipal Corporation Medical Education Trust Medical College
- Type: Public
- Established: 2009; 17 years ago
- Parent institution: Ahmedabad Municipal Corporation
- Affiliations: Gujarat University
- Dean: Dr. Yamini Trivedi
- Students: 200 per year MBBS; 185 per year M.D./M.S.
- Location: Ahmedabad, Gujarat, India
- Campus: Sheth L.G. Hospital
- Website: Narendra Modi Medical College

Narendra Modi Medical College, formerly known as Ahmedabad Municipal Corporation Medical Education Trust Medical College or AMC MET Medical College, is a public medical college in Maninagar, Ahmedabad. The college was established in 2009 and is maintained by the Ahmedabad Municipal Corporation's Medical Education Trust. It is affiliated to the Gujarat University and attached with Sheth Lallubhai Gordhandas Municipal Hospital in Maninagar, Ahmedabad.

== History ==
The foundation stone of the college was laid by the future prime minister Narendra Modi, who was an MLA from the Maninagar constituency at that time. On 15 September 2022, AMC Standing Committee approved renaming of AMC MET Medical College to Narendra Modi Medical College.

== Academics ==
The college enrolls 200 students every year for the undergraduate MBBS course. The post graduation seats in the non-clinical branches were approved in 2014 by the Medical Council of India, (Now known as National Medical Commission). Clinical seats for post graduation also passed in 2016 by Medical Council of India which were 28 in number. Narendra Modi Medical College has increased PG seats which are 170 in number. Sheth LG Hospital has 1050 beds and Narendra Modi Medical College is affiliated to this hospital. Ahmedabad Municipal Corporation was next to Mumbai Municipal Corporation to establish Smt. NHL Municipal Medical College of its own in 1963 and Narendra Modi Medical College in 2009. The Medical College is affiliated to Gujarat University and National Medical Commission (Formerly : Medical Council of India) has granted permission to run the M.B.B.S. course as well as M.D./M.S. courses.

== Campus ==
The college has all the necessary infrastructure and facilities for pre and para clinical departments e.g. laboratories, dissection hall with adequate number of cadavers, museums, lecture halls with teaching aids, multimedia LCD projectors etc. To keep abreast with the recent advances, college has a library with more than 16000 books, journals and computer lab with internet facility and two reading halls of capacity of 150 seats. For recreation, facility of gymkhana and canteen are also available.

Sheth LG General Hospital is the teaching hospital attached to the college which is a 1050 bedded hospital having all the Departments e.g. Medicine & allied, Surgery & allied, Orthopedics, Pediatrics, Obstetrics & Gynecology, plastic surgery etc. It has got facility for emergency care and intensive care of the patients in form of Medical ICU, Pediatric ICU, Surgical ICU and Neonatal ICU, operation theatres, Radiology & Clinical Laboratory departments. The hospital also runs centre for providing family welfare services, Suraksha clinic (for sexually transmitted infections and HIV/AIDS cases).
