= University of Atlanta =

Defunct, for-profit, distance education university

Coordinates: 33°55′38.43″N 84°16′17.90″W

- Type: Private, for-profit, distance education university
- Active: 1991–2013
- Location: United States

The University of Atlanta was a private, for-profit, distance education university headquartered in Atlanta, Georgia. It opened in Mobile, Alabama as Barrington University until it received accreditation in 2008. It relocated to Atlanta in 2008 and changed to the University of Atlanta and was authorized by the State of Georgia's Nonpublic Post Secondary Education Commission. Until it closed June 30, 2013, the University of Atlanta was accredited by the Distance Education and Training Council.

== History ==
=== Operation as Barrington University ===
The University of Atlanta was founded as Barrington University (not to be confused with Barrington College) in the early 1990s by Robert and Steven Bettinger. Barrington University was incorporated, licensed and headquartered in Mobile, Alabama, offering $4,450 degrees, and granting considerable credit for life experiences. Barrington operated as a subsidiary of Boca Raton-based Virtual Academics.

=== Controversy ===
The company's literature claimed that its chairman had a doctorate and a master's degree; an investigation showed that he had neither. Barrington also claimed accreditation by the International Association of Universities and Schools Inc. (IAUS). However, a 2003 investigation by the South Florida Business Journal revealed this was a for-profit corporation set up in Florida (not Switzerland or Washington, D.C., as claimed) by Virtual Academics' chairman, Robert Bettinger, and the owner of another for-profit college in 1998. According to the New York Post, they did this to avoid further problems due to their schools' lack of accreditation. The IAUS' charter was subsequently dissolved by the State of Florida for failure to pay annual registration fees. The South Florida Business Journal also reported that Barrington was paying professors and schools in China commissions to sell Barrington degrees to Chinese students; this revelation caused a major drop in Chinese enrollments and a resulting decline in revenues.

In 2000, school began having problems with the State of Alabama. The state threatened to revoke its operating license. State investigators determined that Barrington had been operating out of the offices of a secretarial and answering service.

A General Accounting Office investigation found that Barrington was offering degrees for a fee based solely on life experience and requiring no classroom experience. By 2008, the State of Alabama was conducting a crackdown on such schools operating in Alabama, requiring that all be accredited or actively seeking accreditation by October.

=== Establishment and operation as University of Atlanta ===
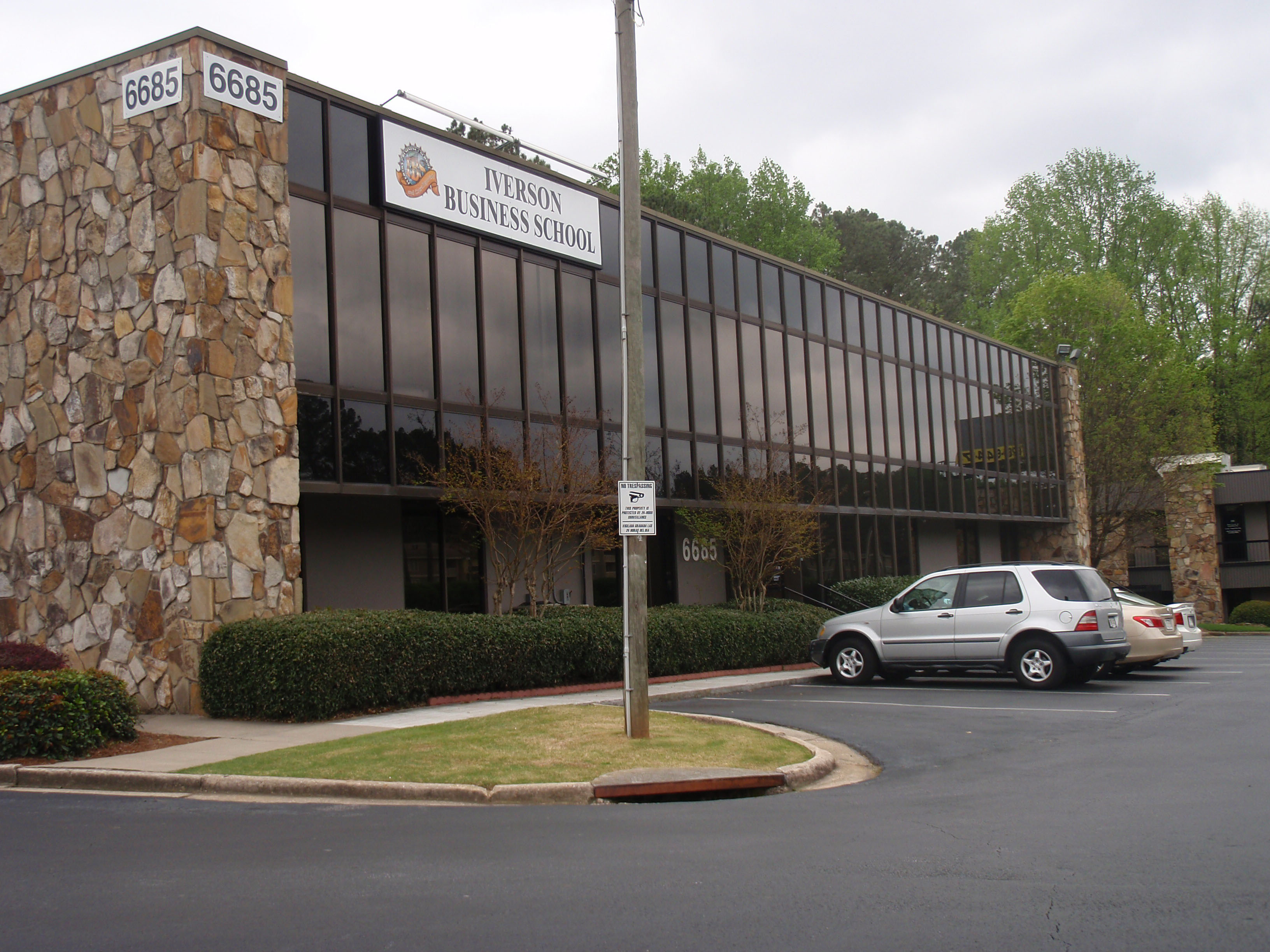
The building in which the University of Atlanta had its office; the sign reads "Iverson Business School"

In 2008, while still operating in Mobile, Barrington changed its name to the University of Atlanta. The university also received accreditation from the Distance Education and Training Council (DETC).

In early 2012, the University of Atlanta's accreditor, the Distance Education and Training Council DETC, announced that the school had stopped enrolling new students. The University of Atlanta resigned its accreditation on June 30, 2013.

== Authorizations and affiliations ==
As Barrington University, the school's only accreditation was a fraudulent one received from an accreditation mill.

The University of Atlanta was authorized by the Georgia Nonpublic Postsecondary Education Commission It was a member of the European Association for Distance Learning the American Council on Education, and the American Academy of Project Management In 2008, it became affiliated with the United States Department of Defense's Activity for Non-Traditional Education Support (DANTES) although in it was listed in the DANTES list of participating institutions. The university was accredited with premier status by the Accreditation Service for International Colleges (ASIC) in the United Kingdom.

== Academics ==
According to the State of Georgia's Nonpublic Post Secondary Education Commission, the University of Atlanta was authorized to grant Bachelor of Science (BSc), Master of Science (MSc) and Doctor of Science degrees in different fields of study.
