= Rai Foundation =

Educational initiative based in India

The Rai Foundation Group is an educational initiative founded in India in 2002. The foundation's stated intent is to improve the quality of education at all educational levels. The foundation opened Rai University in 2012.

== Foundation ==
Since its founding, the Rai Foundation Group has created several initiatives in the field of education. For instance, it offers free scholarships (including free lodging and boarding) for underprivileged girls to pursue bachelor's and master's degrees. It purports to be the philanthropic non-profit body. It was set up with the objective to address various sociocultural concerns of India and its people. To this end, the foundation funded the development and initiation of Rai University.Rai University is in Ahmadabad Gujarat.

== Controversy ==
In 2015, the government attached properties worth more than Rs 500 crore belonging to the Foundation, as part of a legal case relating to alleged sale of fake qualifications and alleged money laundering by the Foundation.

In 2017, proceedings were taken against the trustees of the Foundation for criminally conspiring against students in 2002 when admitting them to law courses in the College of Law and Public Policy, as the college was not licensed to admit students.
