= Udgam School For Children =

Udgam School for Children
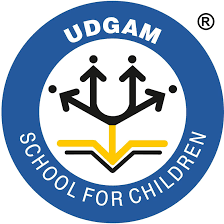

Location
- Opp. Sardar Patel Institute; Thaltej; Thaltej, Ahmedabad, India, Gujarat, 380054; 23°03′0.2″N 72°31′9.6″E

Information
- School type: Private school
- Motto: Hard Work. Honesty. Humility.
- Founded: 1965
- Founder: Sarojben Carvalho
- School board: Central Board of Secondary Education, International Baccalaureate
- School district: Ahmedabad
- Trust: Kantilal Jaikishandas Charitable Trust
- Director: Manan Choksi
- Principal: Ms Sharmistha Sinha (Morning Shift) & Ms Dhanya Ramachandran (Noon Shift)
- Staff: 400
- Classes: Grade 1-12
- Average class size: 40
- Language: English
- Classrooms: 95
- Area: 14510.40 sq.m
- Website: www.udgamschool.com

Udgam School for Children is a private school located at Thaltej, Ahmedabad, Gujarat, India. It is a senior secondary school affiliated to the Central Board of Secondary Education (CBSE), New Delhi. In 2023, they got an approval for International Baccalaureate for Std 11 & Std 12 and in 2025, they introduced Ontario Secondary School Diploma with Udgam Consultancy, becoming the first school in India to launch the program.

== History ==
Udgam School for Children was founded in 1965 by Sarojben Carvalho in a small building with only a handful of students. In1991, the Kantilal Jaikishandas Charitable Trust took a lead and moved the campus to a larger space in Thaltej.

== Controversies ==
- In 2017, a 14-year-old student at Udgam School for Children sustained severe injuries after allegedly falling from a second-floor classroom. The student was hospitalized in critical condition, and local authorities initiated an investigation to determine the circumstances.
- On 5 April 2022, around 5000 students had to wait outside the school due to school bus mismanagement. The parents were not allowed to visit the school office to discuss the same issue. The parents were allowed in only after police intervened. After this incident District Education Officer sent a notice to the school management.
- In 2023, Udgam School was involved in a controversy regarding the Right to Education (RTE) Act admissions. The school cancelled 152 RTE admissions due to invalid income documents from parents, following NSUI allegations. Additionally, the Ahmedabad DEO issued a show-cause notice for withholding exam results of 155 Class 1 RTE students, indicating a potential penalty.
