= J. S. Titiyal =

Indian ophthalmologist

Padma Shri Dr. Jeewan Singh Titiyal
- Born: Tidang, Pithoragarh, Uttarakhand, India
- Education: AIIMS Delhi (MBBS, MS)
- Occupation: Ophthalmologist
- Awards: Padma Shri

Jeewan Singh Titiyal is an Indian ophthalmologist, credited with the first live cornea transplant surgery by an Indian doctor. He was honoured by the Government of India, in 2014, by bestowing on him the Padma Shri, the fourth highest civilian award, for his services to the field of medicine. He currently serves as the President of AIIMS Rajkot.

== Biography ==
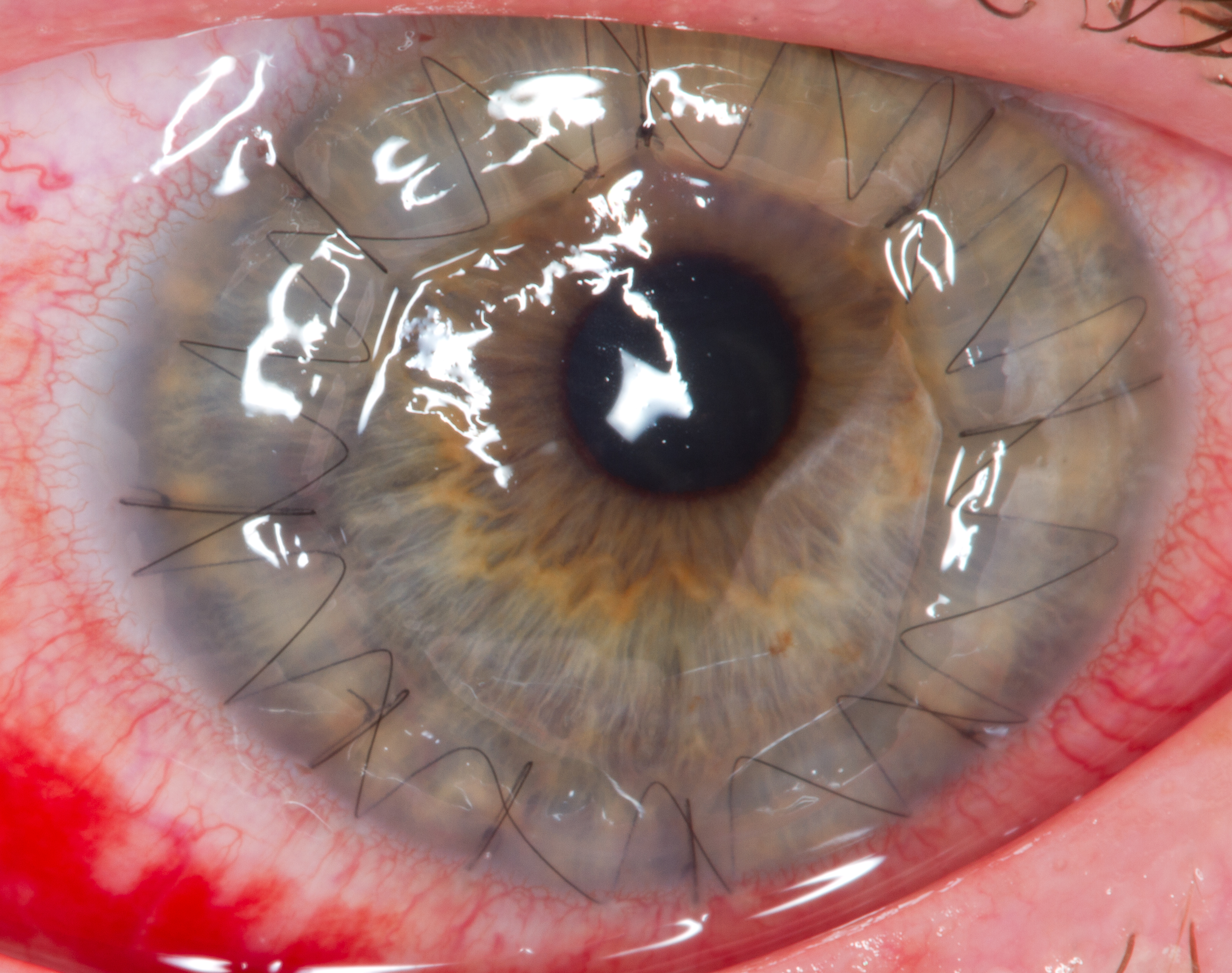
Cornea transplant one day after surgery.

Titiyal is the first Indian eye surgeon who conducted live cornea transplantation at American Academy two years ago and got international fame,, said Dr. Govind, in 2014.

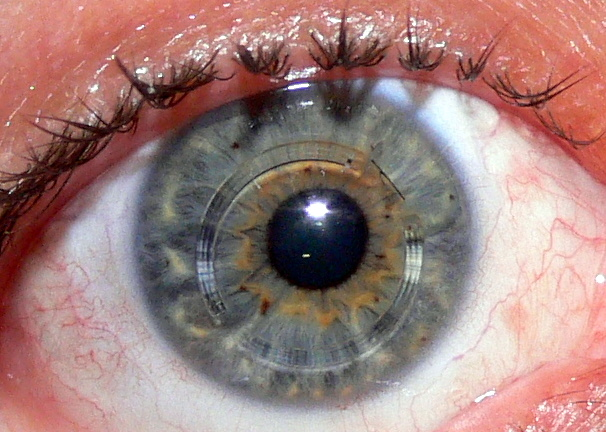
A pair of Intacs after insertion into the cornea

Jeewan Singh Titiyal was born at Tidang, a small village in Dharchula, Pithoragarh district, along the Indo-Nepalese border in Uttarakhand state in India and did his early schooling at a local school in Dharchula. Choosing a career in medicine, Titiyal graduated from All India Institute of Medical Sciences, New Delhi and did his higher studies in ophthalmology from Dr. Rajendra Prasad Centre for Ophthalmic Sciences at AIIMS. He completed his senior residency in cornea and refractive unit from the same institute. Dr. Titiyal, on completion of his senior residency, joined the faculty of Dr. RP Centre for Ophthalmic Sciences itself, January 1991, to kick start his career and has been working there ever since. Rising up the ranks, he is now a Professor there, head of unit in the cornea and refractive surgery division.

Titiyal's sibling, Dr. Govind Singh Titiyal, is also an ophthalmologist and Professor, serving as the principal of Government Medical College, Haldwani.

== Achievements and legacy ==
J. S. Titiyal, as a specialist in Keratoplasty, Refractive surgery, Stem Cell transplantation, Contact lens, Low Vision Aid and Cataract including Phacoemulsification and Pediatric cataract, has several notable achievements during his career. He is reported to have performed the first live cornea transplantation surgery among Indian surgeons. He is credited with the first Intacs procedure for complex corneal problems. He has done successful surgeries on many eminent personalities such as Dalai Lama, Manmohan Singh (former Prime Minister of India), Sheila Dikshit (former Chief Minister of Delhi), Dr. Murali Manohar Joshi (former Union Minister) and Prakash Singh Badal (former Chief Minister of Punjab), among others.

Titiyal delivered the first Dr. B. D. Joshi Oration on Therapeutic Contact Lenses in June 1999, organized by Vidarbha Ophthalmic Society. He has organized three international conferences on ophthalmology, the most notable one being the Orbis International, at New Delhi, in 1999. He regularly takes part in national and international conferences to give lectures and live surgical demonstrations. He has conducted various free eye camps across the country such as:

- IOL camp at Rewari, Haryana
- Mega Eye Camp at Odisha in October 1998
- Eye Camp at Andaman and Nicobar, in 1992
- Mega Eye Camp at Shillong, in September 2003

In 2001, Titiyal conducted a training program, in Thiruvananthapuram, in September 2001, on invitation from the Government of Kerala. He sits on the examination boards of various universities for their medical examinations and serves as the official advisor to the Union Public Service Commission.

== Positions ==
Dr. J. S. Titiyal has been associated with many organizations, working with them holding positions of responsibility.

- Officer in Charge - National Eye Bank, India
- President - Delhi Ophthalmological Society
- President - Indian Society of Corneal and Kerato-Refractive Surgeons (ISCKRS)
- Member- American Society of Cataract and Refractive Surgery
- Member- Contact Lens Association of Ophthalmologist (CLAO) USA
- Member- International Association of Contact Lens Educators (IACLE)
- Member- All India Ophthalmological Society
- Chief of R.P. Centre of Ophthalmic Centre
- President of AIIMS Rajkot

== Awards and recognitions ==
Titiyal was honoured by the Government of India by awarding him the Padma Shri, in 2014, in recognition of his efforts to the cause of medicine.

== Publications ==
Titiyal has written many articles which have been published in per-reviewed journals of international repute. He has also written chapters in many ophthalmological text books. He is the Chief Editor of DOS Times, the monthly bulletin of Delhi Ophthalmological Society.

Selected articles

- Namrata Sharma; Rashim Mannan; Vishal Jhanji; Tushar Agarwal; Archna Pruthi; Jeewan S. Titiyal; Rasik B. Vajpayee (2011). "Ultrasound Biomicroscopy-Guided Assessment of Acute Corneal Hydrops". Ophthalmology. 118 (11): 2166–2171. doi:10.1016/j.ophtha.2011.03.040. PMID 21777979. Archived from the original on 12 September 2014.
- Radhika Tandon; Noopur Gupta; Mani Kalaivani; Namrata Sharma; Jeewan S Titiyal; Rasik B Vajpayee (2010). "Amniotic membrane transplantation as an adjunct to medical therapy in acute ocular burns". British Journal of Ophthalmology. 95 (2): 199–204. doi:10.1136/bjo.2009.173716. PMID 20675729. S2CID 7416236. Archived from the original on 24 June 2016.
- Gaurav Prakash; Namrata Sharma; Radhika Tandon; Jeewan S. Titiyal (2010). "Iatrogenic Conjunctival Entrapment of Cilium and Scleral Ulceration After Subtenon Steroid Injection". Eye & Contact Lens: Science & Clinical Practice. 36 (2): 137–138. doi:10.1097/ICL.0b013e3181cf6165. PMID 20093939. S2CID 205658856. Archived from the original on 12 September 2014.
- Namrata Sharma; Rashim Mannan; Jeewan S Titiyal (2011). "Nonresolution of Acute Hydrops Because of Intrastromal Migration of Perfluoropropane Gas". Cornea. 29 (8): 944–946. doi:10.1097/ICO.0b013e3181ca6353. PMID 20508502. S2CID 26762971. Archived from the original on 24 June 2016.
- Namrata Sharma; Ritika Sachdev; Vishal Jhanji; Jeewan S Titiyal; Rasik B Vajpayee (2010). "Therapeutic keratoplasty for microbial keratitis". Current Opinion in Ophthalmology. 21 (4): 293–300. doi:10.1097/ICU.0b013e32833a8e23. PMID 20531191. S2CID 22009476. Archived from the original on 24 June 2016.
