= Rai University =

Private university in Gujarat, India

- Motto: Evolving Thinking Minds
- Type: Private
- Established: 2012
- Affiliations: UGC, AIU
- President: Amit Rai
- Provost: Dr. Anil Tomar
- Location: Ahmedabad, Gujarat, India; 22.816989°N 72.473361°E
- Website: www.raiuniversity.edu

Rai University (RU) is a private university located in Ahmedabad, Gujarat, India. The university was established in 2012 by the Rai Foundation through the Gujarat Private Universities Act (Amendment), 2012, the same act which established Indus University.

== History ==
Rai University was originally established by the Rai Foundation in 2002 in Chhattisgarh, one of 46 universities which were established through The Chhattisgarh Niji Kshetra Vishwavidyalaya (Sthapana aur Viniyaman) Adhiniyam, 2001 within a year. The act empowered the state to establish a university through a gazette notification and further allowed such universities to affiliate colleges and set up campuses. At its peak, the university had eleven campuses around Chhattisgarh and a total of 29 colleges across 25 campuses in India and abroad. It offered more than 300 courses. In 2005 the Supreme Court of India passed a decision which cancelled the relevant sections in the above-mentioned act, thus closing 117 universities, Rai University among them. The various campuses under Rai Foundation sought affiliation with other university such as Pandit Ravishankar Shukla University for the Raipur campus the Delhi University for the New Delhi campus and the Maharishi Dayanand University for the Gurgaon campus.

One of the campuses was the Belapur campus at Ahmedabad, Gujarat, which was established in 2004. In 2012 the Government of Gujarat invited the Rai Foundation to establish a private university in the Belapur campus. The university was established in 2012 through the Gujarat Private Universities Act (Amendment), 2012, the same act which established Indus University.

== Academics ==
The university offers both undergraduate (B.Sc., B.A., BBA and LLB) courses and postgraduate (M.Sc., M.Tech., MBA) ones, as well as engineering diploma courses. Admission is based on national and state entrance exams and a personal interview. Ph.D. positions are also available. The university is approved by the University Grants Commission (UGC) which has also published an inspection report in 2015, and a member of the Association of Indian Universities (AIU).

== Schools ==
The institute runs nine schools:

- School of Engineering and Applied Sciences (SEAS)
- Rai Business School (RBS)
- College of Media & Communication (CMAC)
- Institute of Design Engineering and Architecture (IDEA)
- College of Hospitality and Tourism (CHAT)
- School of Fashion Technology & Performing Arts (SOFT)
- School of Arts, Science & Commerce (SASC)
- School of Law (SOL)
- School of Agriculture (SOA)
- School of Life Sciences (SOLS)
- Center for Research & Development (CRD)
- School of Pharmacy (SOP)

== Controversy ==
In 2016 the Government of Gujarat directed Rai University (along with Parul University) to stop admission to its agriculture courses which were unrecognized by the government. This has led to student protests. The university has issued a public notice clarifying that as a university approved by state Act, the above-mentioned recognition is not required.
