= Education in Ahmedabad =

Ahmedabad is considered as an important hub for higher education in India with history is stretching back to the pre-independence era.

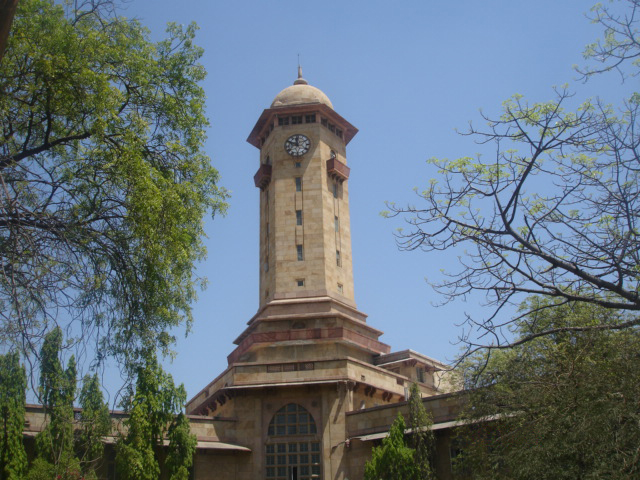
The Gujarat University clock tower in Ahmedabad

Ahmedabad had a literacy rate of 79.89% in 2001 which rose to 89.62 percent in 2011. Out of this, male and female literacy are 93.96 and 84.81 percent respectively, as of 2011 census.

Schools in Ahmedabad are run either by the AMC or privately by individuals and trusts. Majority of the schools are affiliated to the Gujarat Secondary and Higher Secondary Education Board (GSEB). Some schools like the Delhi Public School and the Kendriya Vidyalayas are associated with the Central Board for Secondary Education (CBSE). After completing their secondary education, students typically enroll in junior college (also known as pre-university) in one of three streams — Arts, Commerce, or Science. Upon completing the required coursework, students enroll in general or professional degrees.

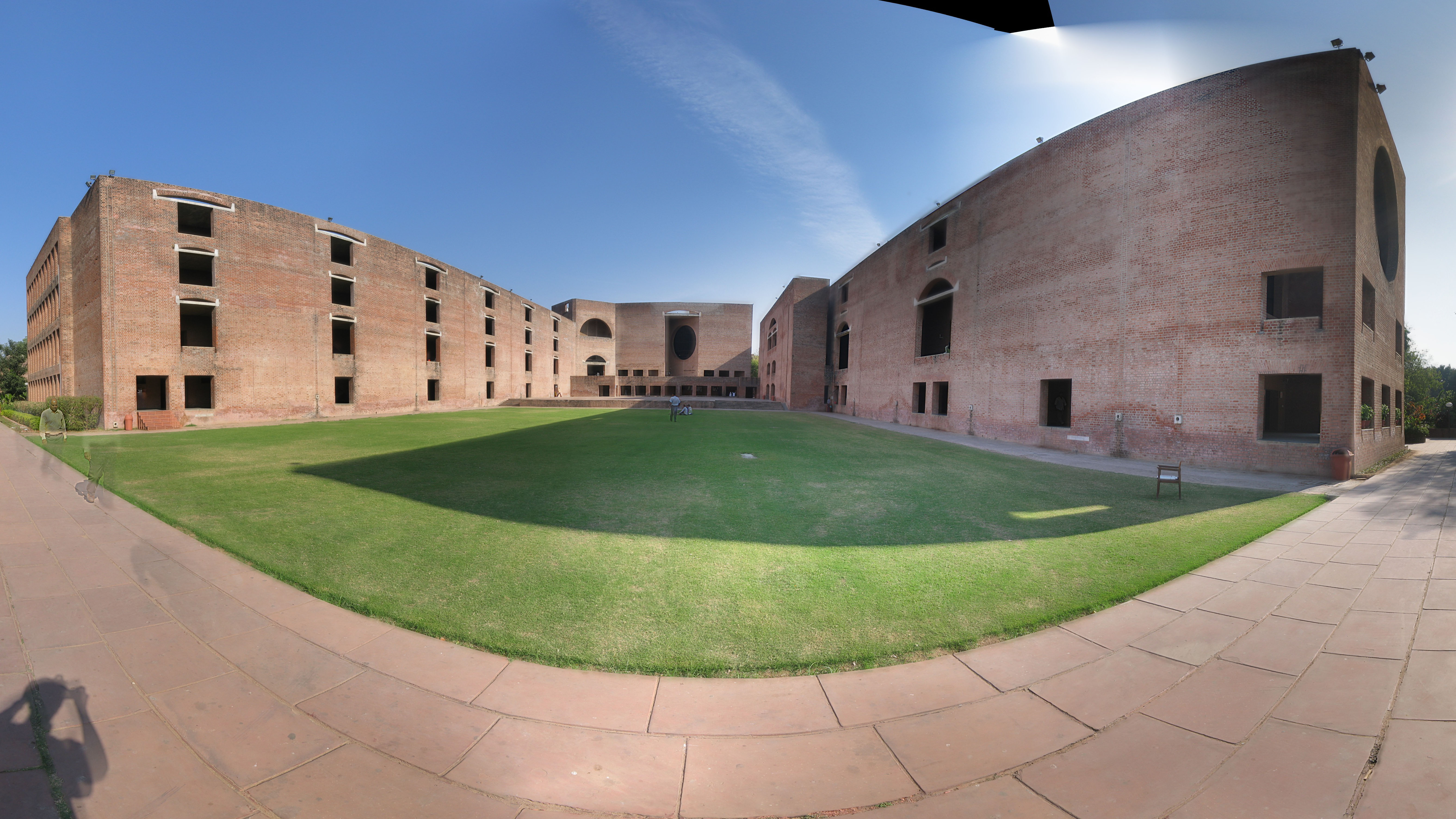
IIM Ahmedabad panoramic view

Many colleges in the city are affiliated to the Gujarat University and offer courses in Medicine, Arts, Science, Commerce, Law and Management. Engineering colleges of the city are affiliated to Gujarat Technological University. Other deemed universities in Ahmedabad are Ahmedabad University, Gujarat Vidyapeeth, Nirma University of Science & Technology and Dr. Babasaheb Ambedkar Open University.

Ahmedabad is home to prestigious institutes like the Indian Institute of Management, National Institute of Design, Mudra Institute of Communications Ahmedabad, National Institute of Fashion Technology, the Center for Environmental Planning and Technology, and B.J. Medical College.

Many academic and scientific institutions of national repute were set up in Ahmedabad due to the efforts of Vikram Sarabhai. The most important of these are the Physical Research Laboratory and the Space Applications Centre which fall under the Ahmedabad centre of the Indian Space Research Organisation. The Vikram Sarabhai Community Science Centre aims to educate children about the various aspects of science.

== See also ==
- Ahmedabad Education Society
- List of educational institutes of Ahmedabad
