= Delhi Public School, Bopal =

Location
- Bopal Square, Nr. Bopal Railway Crossing, Bopal 380058; Ahmedabad, India, Gujarat; 23.044137°N 72.457651°E

Information
- School type: English Medium
- Established: 1995; 31 years ago
- Founder: Dr. Manjula Pooja Shroff
- Principal: Ms. Sabina Sawhney
- Grades: Nursery-12
- Affiliations: CBSE

Delhi Public School is a school located in Bopal, Ahmedabad, India. Established in 1995, it is an English medium school affiliated with CBSE. DPS Bopal is part of Kalorex.

The current principal is Ms. Sabina Sawhney
