= Dhirubhai Ambani Institute of Information and Communication Technology =

Private university in Gandhinagar, Gujarat, India

Dhirubhai Ambani University
- Former names: Dhirubhai Ambani Institute of Information and Communication Technology
- Type: State private university
- Established: 2001
- Accreditation: NAAC; UGC
- Affiliations: AIU
- President: Tina Anil Ambani
- Director-General: Dr. Tathagata Bandyopadhyay
- Location: Gandhinagar, Gujarat, 382 007, India; 23°11′18″N 72°37′41″E
- Website: www.daiict.ac.in

Dhirubhai Ambani Institute of Information and Communication Technology (DA-IICT), officially known as Dhirubhai Ambani University (DAU), is a private university located in Gandhinagar, Gujarat, India. It is named after Reliance Group founder Dhirubhai Ambani. It is run by the Dhirubhai Ambani Foundation and is promoted by the Anil Dhirubhai Ambani Group.

== History ==
DA-IICT began admitting students in August 2001, with an intake of 240 undergraduate students for its Bachelor of Technology (B.Tech.) program in Information and Communication Technology (ICT). Over the years, it expanded to include postgraduate courses such as Master of Technology (M.Tech.) in ICT, Master of Science (M.Sc.) in Data Science, Master of Science (M.Sc.) in Information Technology, Master of Science (M.Sc.) in Agriculture and Rural Development, Master in Design (M.Des.), and a Doctor of Philosophy (Ph.D.) program. The duration of the bachelor's program was four years. The first batch of DA-IICT postgraduates graduated in 2004, and the first batch of undergraduates graduated in 2005.

In 2004, three M.Sc. (IT) students from DA-IICT challenged IIM Ahmedabad's decision to deny them admission interviews, citing the institute's eligibility criteria based on AIU and AICTE affiliation. The case was brought in the Gujarat High Court, which ruled in favor of the students. Following the judgment, the CAT eligibility criteria were subsequently modified.

In 2023, the institute ranked first in the IIRF Ranking 2023 for private universities.

=== Renaming and Expansion ===
In March 2024, the Gujarat Legislative Assembly passed a bill to rename the Dhirubhai Ambani Institute of Information and Communication Technology (DA-IICT) to Dhirubhai Ambani University (DAU). This change was part of a broader effort to align the institution with the National Education Policy (NEP) 2020, which emphasizes multidisciplinary education and research. The renaming reflects the university's expanded scope, moving beyond its original focus on information and communication technology (ICT) to include a wide range of disciplines.

== Student achievements ==
- Student teams won the TI DSP Design Competition in 2005, 2006 and 2007.
- Teams of four students each won the Microsoft Imagine cup for two consecutive years in 2006 and 2007.
- Two of its teams were winners at the Microsoft, High Performance Computing Scholars Program 2008.
- Two students won Google Women Engineering Award in year 2009 and 2010.
- Team of 4 students won the Unlimited Potential Multipoint Education Award of the Microsoft Imagine Cup 2009, World Finals. The same team stood third in the National Finals in the Software Design category of the Microsoft Imagine Cup 2009, India Finals.
- A student won Innovate4Women Award of the Microsoft Imagine Cup 2010 and one of its team were National Finalist in Microsoft Imagine Cup India.
- 17 students selected for Google Summer of Code, 2012, the highest number in India and third highest in the world.
- Team of 4 students stood third at the National Finals for "Samsung USID Design Challenge", 2012 for their app "Location Alarm".
- Team DA-Developers represented DA-IICT at the Imagine Cup 2013 National Finals and stood third in India for Imagine Cup World Citizenship contest with their app "Read For Blind".
- 17 students from DA-IICT selected for the prestigious Google Summer Of Code, 2013.
- Team of 2 students from DA-IICT won the GNLU Debate 2016 in the Novice category.
- DAIICT was ranked 11th in the world for student developers among universities in year 2016 by HackerRank.

== See also ==
- Education in India
- List of universities in India
- List of institutions of higher education in Gujarat
