= TransStadia University =

Indian universities specializing in education and research

- Type: Private
- Established: 2022
- Location: Ahmedabad, Gujarat, India
- Campus: Urban
- Colors: Blue, Orange & Green
- Website: tsuniv.edu.in

TransStadia University is a private university located in Ahmedabad, Gujarat, India. It was established in 2022 after being granted university status by the Gujarat Legislative Assembly. The university is part of the TransStadia Group and focuses on education in sports, management, and technology.

== Academics ==
The university offers undergraduate programs through its various schools:

- School of Sports Studies – Courses in sports management and business.
- School of Management – Focused on business and leadership.
- School of Computer Science & AI – Offers programs in computing and artificial intelligence, in collaboration with IBM.

== Campus ==
The university is located near Kankaria Lake in Ahmedabad and features a 1.4 million sq. ft. facility with modern sports infrastructure and technology-driven classrooms.

== Leadership ==
TransStadia University is led by Founder and Chairman Udit Sheth, with a focus on experiential learning aligned with the New Education Policy (NEP 2020).
