= Kadi Sarva Vishwavidyalaya =

Private university in Gujarat, India

- KSV
- Motto: 'Kar Bhala Hoga Bhala'
- Established: 2007
- President: Vallabhbhai M. Patel
- Vice-Chancellor: Dr. Gargi Rajapara (in-charge)
- Dean: Dr. Bhavin Pandya (Faculty of Management); Dr. Veenaben Patel (Faculty of Education)
- Students: 52,000
- Location: Sector-15, KH-5, Gandhinagar-382015, Gujarat (India), Gandhinagar, Gujarat, India
- Campus: Urban
- Website: Official website

Kadi Sarva Vishwavidyalaya (KSV) or Kadi Sarva University is a private university in Gandhinagar, Gujarat, India.

== History ==
Sarva Vidyalaya Kelvani Mandal, Kadi (promoter of Kadi Sarva Vishwavidyalaya) was established in 1919.

Kadi Sarva Vishwavidyalaya is a university established vide Gujarat State Government Act 21 of 2007 in May 2007 and approved by UGC (ref f. 9-18/2008(cpp-1) 19 March 2009). The university was set up by Sarva Vidyalaya Kelavani Mandal, a trust.

== Academics ==
Kadi Sarva Vishwavidyalaya offers post-graduate courses in 25 disciplines like MBA, MCA, ME, M.Pharm. M.Sc. (Chemistry, Physics, Mathematics, Nursing, Bio-Technology, IT), M.Ed., M.A., etc.; graduation level courses in 17 disciplines viz. B.E., B.Pharm., BBA, BCA, B.Sc. (Chemistry, Mathematics, Bio-technology, Nursing, Physics), B.Voc. etc.; and diploma courses in seven disciplines. Kadi Sarva Vishwavidyalaya has become a pioneer in registering Doctoral students with 17 major disciplines like Management, Engineering, Pharmacy, Computer Science, Biotechnology, Mathematics, Physics, Chemistry, English, Psychology, Physical Education and many more. KSV offers M.Phil. courses in five disciplines ranging from computer science to English language.
