= Nootan Medical College and Research Centre, Visnagar =

Medical college in Visnagar, Gujarat

Coordinates: 23.6830809°N 72.5477618°E

- Type: Medical College and Hospital
- Established: 2016; 10 years ago
- Affiliations: Sankalchand Patel University
- Location: Visnagar, Gujarat, India
- Website: mbbs.spu.ac.in

Nootan Medical College and Research Centre, Visnagar is a medical college located in Visnagar, Mahesana district, Gujarat. It was established in the year 2016 and the campus is spread over 84 acres. The college imparts the degree, Bachelor of Medicine and Bachelor of Surgery (MBBS), apart from Nursing and para-medical courses.

The college is affiliated with Sankalchand Patel University and is recognised by Medical Council of India. The selection to the college is done on the basis of merit through National Eligibility and Entrance Test. It is run by the Nootan Sarva Vidyalaya Kelavani Mandal founded by Sankalchand Patel, a freedom fighter.

== Courses ==
Nootan Medical College and Research Centre, Visnagar undertakes education and training of students MBBS courses. This college is offering 150 MBBS seats from 2019 of which 85% Seats are of state quota and 15% is for National Counselling.

Twin-Sharing AC and Non-AC hostel rooms are available for both male and female students.
