= Maninagar =

- Neighbourhood
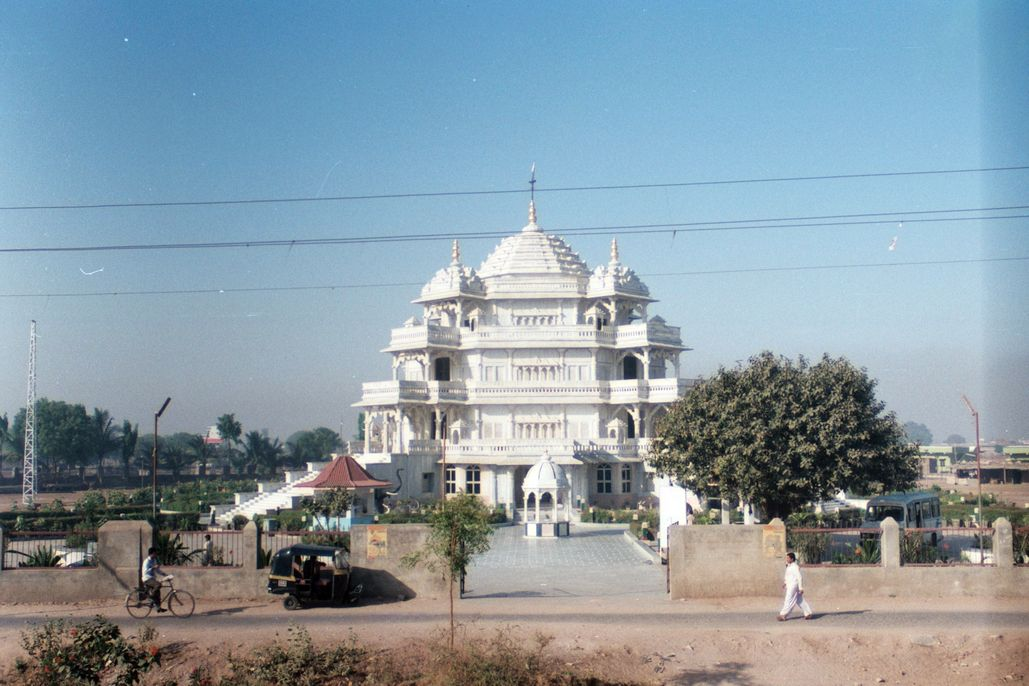
- Maninagar Mandir

- Location in Ahmedabad, Gujarat, India Maninagar (Gujarat) Maninagar (India)
- Coordinates: 22.9995°N 72.6003°E
- Country: India
- State: Gujarat
- Metro: Ahmedabad

Government
  - Body: Ahmedabad Municipal Corporation
- Elevation: 53 m (174 ft)
  - Density: 258/km^{2} (670/sq mi)

Languages
  - Official: Gujarati, Hindi, English
- Time zone: UTC+5:30 (IST)
- PIN: 380 008
- Vehicle registration: GJ-01-XX-XXXX (Former), GJ-27-XX-XXXX (Current)
- Civic agency: Ahmedabad Municipal Corporation
- Website: gujaratindia.com

Maninagar is an area of Ahmedabad city, Gujarat, India. It is located in the southern part of the city and an important area of the city. It can be divided into two regions - Maninagar East and Maninagar West, separated by the Maninagar Railway Station.

Narendra Modi who was also the Chief Minister of the Gujarat State Government had represented this constituency as a Member of the Legislative Assembly till 21 May 2014, when he resigned as Gujarat CM for the position of Prime Minister of India and also resigned as Maninagar MLA.

== History ==
Maninagar is originally a land that belonged to Seth Maneklal Manilal, a powerful banker. He donated a big piece of this land to develop the first organized settlement outside the walled city. Sardar Vallabhbhai Patel created the first town planning scheme for Manipur, now called Maninagar.

== Cityscape ==
The Kankaria lake and Nagina Wadi are situated in this area. This area also hosts a train station on the Ahmedabad-Mumbai line where most of the major trains stop.

Maninagar is also the entrance to the Ahmedabad-Vadodara expressway.

== Sports ==
Transtadia Stadium is built near Kankaria, which has become a hub for many sporting events. Arena located there is the home stadium for Gujarat Giants of Pro-Kabaddi League.

Physical Ground is a multi-sports stadium situated in Khokhra. It was inaugurated in the year 2010. The stadium serves place to play sports like cricket, football, badminton, chess, wrestling, judo, and basketball.

In the month of March 2011, Gujarat state level; chess competition, 200 m running, kabaddi, cricket and badminton were held

It was one of the centers for Khel-Maha-kumbh that was held in 2011 by Government of Gujarat.
