= All India Institute of Medical Sciences, Rajkot =

Medical school and hospital in Gujarat, India

- અખિલ ભારતીય આયુર્વિજ્ઞાન સંસ્થા, રાજકોટ
- Other names: AIIMS, Rajkot
- Motto: sarve santu nirōgyaḥ vidyā amṛtaṃ śrute
- Type: Public, medical school
- Established: 2020; 6 years ago
- President: Dr. Jeewan Singh Titiyal
- Director: Dr. L. N. Dorairajan
- Location: Rajkot, Gujarat, 360006, India
- Campus: Rural, 201 acres (81 ha)
- Website: www.aiimsrajkot.edu.in

All India Institute of Medical Sciences, Rajkot (AIIMS Rajkot) is a public medical school and hospital based in Rajkot, Gujarat, India, and one of the All India Institutes of Medical Sciences (AIIMSs). The first academic session of AIIMS Rajkot began on 21 December 2020. On 31 December 2020 Prime Minister Narendra Modi laid the foundation stone of the institute.

== Academics ==
Union Health and Family Welfare Minister Harsh Vardhan virtually inaugurated the first academic batch of MBBS students 21 December 2020 for the 2020-21 batch. The institute became operational with the first batch of 50 MBBS students, one of the four AIIMSs to become operational in academic year 2020–21. In 2021 the institute functioned from a temporary campus at Pandit Deendayal Upadhyay Medical College with AIIMS Jodhpur mentoring it.
