= Khokhra =

- Neighbourhood
- Location in Ahmedabad, Gujarat, India Khokhra (Gujarat) Khokhra (India)
- Coordinates: 22°59′N 72°36′E
- Country: India
- State: Gujarat
- District: Ahmedabad

Government
  - Body: Ahmedabad Municipal Corporation

Languages
  - Official: Gujarati, Hindi
- Time zone: UTC+5:30 (IST)
- PIN: 380008
- Telephone code: 91-079
- Lok Sabha constituency: Ahmedabad
- Civic agency: Ahmedabad Municipal Corporation

Khokhra is an area located in Ahmedabad, India. Its PIN code is 380008.

Khokhra had many textile mills such as Asoka Cotsyn and Arvind Limited. While most of the mills have shut down long back, couple of them still operate from Khokara. Khokhra has recently turned to be a much better locality as the closed mill compounds have been converted to educational and residential hubs. Khokhra now has a dental college, Engineering college, Commerce and arts college.

In December 2021, Ahmedabad Municipal Corporation planned the redevelopment of slum quarters at Khokhra and a petition opposing the project in the High Court was dismissed.
