= Parul University =

University in Vadodara, Gujarat, India

Coordinates: 22.2887512052231°N 73.36339703785765°E

- Former name: Parul Group of Institutes
- Type: Private University
- Established: 1993; 33 years ago (as Parul Group of Institutes); 2015; 11 years ago (as Parul University)
- Parent institution: Parul Arogya Seva Mandal Trust
- Accreditation: NAAC Grade A++, NABL
- Affiliations: UGC
- Academic affiliations: NAAC, AICTE, AIU, PCI, BCI, COA, Ministry of Ayush, CCH, GNC, NMC, IAP
- President: Dr. Aman Dubey
- Vice-president: Parul Patel
- Provost: Amit Ganatral
- Academic staff: 8000
- Administrative staff: 2500
- Students: 70000+
- Undergraduates: 30,000+
- Postgraduates: 5,000+
- Doctoral students: 1,000+
- Location: Main Campus: Village-Limda, Waghodia taluka, Vadodara, Gujarat, India
- Campus: 200+ acres; Rural
- Language: English
- Colors: Blue, red, yellow & white
- Nickname: PU
- Website: www.paruluniversity.ac.in

Parul University is a private university in Vadodara, Gujarat, India. Prior to its incorporation as Parul University under the Gujarat Private Universities Act Second Amendment of 2009, the university's origins traces back to 1993, with the establishment of the Ahmedabad Homeopathic College. Parul University is situated on a 117-acre campus in Vadodara housing over 50,000 students and has a rich history of achievements, including being Gujarat's first self-financed institute. Since inception, the university adopted an expansionist strategy that led to the establishment of campuses beyond its original location in Ahmedabad to cities such as Rajkot and culminated in Vadodara in 2003, where the main campus was subsequently established and further plans to expand in North India by opening its career counselling centre in Chandigarh.

The university is also commitment to community welfare, particularly in healthcare, organising various health camps. In 2009, it established Parul Sevashram Hospital (PSH) NABH accrediated, a teaching hospital known for providing quality, subsidized medical care to local communities and people from various parts of India.

The university hosts 2,000 international students representing 56 different nationalities. In 2023, Parul University achieved a significant milestone by becoming the youngest university in India to receive a Grade A++ accreditation from the National Assessment and Accreditation Council (NAAC). Dr. Devanshu Patel, the current president of the university emphasises on fostering entrepreneurship and innovation. Parul University was ranked among the top 50 universities by NIRF Innovation Rankings 2023 for innovation. The university has 32 institutes that offer over 450 UG, PG, diploma, and PhD programmes.

== History, governance and leadership ==
Parul Arogya Seva Mandal Trust, PASM, a charitable trust founded in 1989 is the governing Trust of Parul University.The trust was founded with the primary objective of advancing education, social welfare, and healthcare within society. Over the years, it has steadfastly focused on enhancing the educational landscape through impactful initiatives. In 2022, the PASM furthered its educational footprint by assuming management of Anand Vidya Vihar and New Era Senior Secondary School, institutions located in Vadodara, Gujarat, thereby expanding its influence into primary and secondary education alongside its existing commitment to higher education. Parul University was established under Gujarat Private University Act 2009 passed by Government of Gujarat in 2015 giving university status to the Parul Group of Institutes by UGC.

Devanshu Patel is the managing trustee and president of Parul University and Parul Patel as trustee and vice president (student affairs & general administration) and chair admissions committee, Komal Patel as trustee and vice president (medical & paramedical health sciences) and medical director and Geetika Patel as trustee and vice president (quality, research & health sciences) and medical director.

== Affiliations and accreditations ==
The University Grants Commission has conferred upon Parul University in Vadodara the title of Category 1 University with Graded Autonomy. This designation acknowledges the institution's commitment to providing quality education and offering comprehensive learning opportunities across interdisciplinary and multidisciplinary programs. Parul University is recognised by AICTE, received NAAC A++ Grade in 2023 and accredited by NBA Parul University is also an undersigning party to the Association of Commonwealth Universities and Association of Indian Universities. Ministry of Education's Innovation Cell granted Parul University a 4-star Ranking. Parul University also ranks in top 50 private universities in India under the Atal Ranking of Institutions on Innovation Achievements (ARIIA), an initiative of the Ministry Of Human Resource Development (MHRD) for providing an innovation-oriented approach to learning.

Parul University is recognised by Department of Scientific and Industrial Research (DSIR), the Bar Council of India (BCI), Pharmacy Council of India (PCI), India Nursing Council, National Medical Council (NMC), and Ministry of Ayush. The university is also a member of the Association of Indian Universities (AIU), the Central Council for Homeopathy, the Central Council for Indian Medicine, the Ministry of Health and Family Welfare. It is also accredited by the National Accreditation Board for Hospitals and Healthcare Providers (NABH) and National Accreditation Board for Testing and Calibration Laboratories (NABL). The Gujarat State Institutional Rating Framework (GSIRF) ranked Parul Institute of Pharmacy in top honours in the pharmacy category.

== Parul University Online ==
Parul University launched Parul University Online in early 2023 , offering a range of distance learning programs including MBA, BBA, MCA, BCA, MA, Master of Social Work, Master of Arts, and Master of Commerce.

The Online Programs at Parul University offer training in high-demand skills. The curriculum is tailored to meet industry needs, incorporating specialised content and utilising state-of-the-art teaching methodologies.

== Academics ==
Parul University has over 450 diploma, undergraduate, postgraduate and doctoral programmes in sciences, medicine and allied sciences, arts, humanities and social sciences, engineering and architecture, pharmacy, animation and design, law, management and business administration, biosciences, commerce, computer application and IT, hospitality and tourism and media, mass communication and journalism streams. Its diploma courses streams like engineering, design, DPharm, DPMHS, D.Arch, DHMCT, DAM and DPA. Its UG courses include BTech, BBA, BBA (Hons.), BBA-MBA, BBA LLB, BCom LLB, BA LLB, LLB, B.Des, B.Com, B.Com (Hons.), BCA, BCA (Hons.), BPharm, BArch, BAMS, BHMS, B.Sc Nursing, BSc Agriculture and BSc Hospitality.

Parul University post-graduation courses include MTech, MBA, Online MBA, LLM, M.Des, M.Com, MCA, MPharm, MPlan, MS and M.Sc Nursing.The university expanded its academic offerings by establishing the Faculty of Performing Arts, introducing programs in Music, Dance, and Drama aimed at enhancing creative education and cultural integration within the country. In January 2024, the university's Performing Arts faculty achieved a notable milestone by becoming the first private university to win the Association of Indian Universities (AIU) regional rounds and secure the second runners-up position in the national rounds.

== Affiliated colleges ==
The university has the following affiliated colleges

- Parul Institute of Hotel Management & Catering Technology, Vadodara
- Rajkot Homoeopathic Medical College - [RHMC], Rajkot
- Parul Institute of Pharmacy and Research, Vadodara
- Parul Institute of Management - [PIM], Vadodara
- Ahmedabad Physiotherapy College - [APC], Ahmedabad
- Parul Institute of Technology - [PIT], Vadodara
- Parul Institute of Engineering and Technology - [PIET], Vadodara
- Parul Institute of Applied Sciences [PIAS], Vadodara
- Parul Institute of Medical Science and Research, Vadodara

== Campus and infrastructure ==
It has a campus area of 117 acres, in the city of Vadodara.The university buildings incorporate a combination of peach, brick-faced, and concrete structures designed with sustainability by the planting of over 3,500 additional trees and greenery on campus. The campus has indoor and outdoor sports facilities including football, cricket, hockey fields with handball, volleyball, and badminton court. It also has a reading room, a yoga room, and a gym. Parul University library has books, in the fields of engineering, science, technology and management. The university has medical practitioner is available during college hours.

- The Parul University Gate - This monumental structure inspired by ancient Greek architecture with 173 feet in length and 35 feet in height.
- The PU Circle - The circle stands at the centre of the university.
- The Design Building - Features unique design element with a natural raw finish, featuring art pieces and structural design sculptures and is home to the school of performing arts, design and fine arts.
- Central Administration Block - The central administration block is a blend of nature and architecture to present both a functional and aesthetic design with its peach colour finishes.
- The CV Raman Computing Centre - The centre stands as the university's main technology hotspot with high-tech facilities and resources. The computer centre has system/application software, operating system, and various utility software. In 2022, QuickTech (Apple Authorised distributor) & Tinkering Hub, Parul University (PU) signed an MoU to set up iQuickLab which is the first lab in the city with Apple devices.

== Research grants and memoranda of understanding ==
In the year 2022, Parul University established collaborations for offering industry embedded programs in association SAP, Quick Heal, Microsoft, among others. The university also made collaborations with various institutions in Europe for the grant of European Commission under erasmus plus programme. It's institute of applied sciences signed an MoU with Government Institute of Forensic Sciences for joint research activities and students & teacher exchange. The university also entered into an MoU for investment with the Gujarat state government to invest in educational infrastructure under Vibrant Gujarat

In 2019, Parul University signed an MoU with CII for faculty and student development programmes and in 2021, with National Defence Academy to provide continuing education opportunities to boarded out cadets. Germany-based Fachhochschule Bielefeld also known as University of Applied Sciences (UAS) also signed an MoU with Parul University to establish long-term academic and research relation in management sciences and over 80 other partnerships and agreements with Universities across Europe, USA, Canada, Australia, Japan among others.

== Major events ==
National Healthcare Skill Conclave 2023 was organised in association with Pragya – the Advanced Skills and Simulation Centre, healthcare skill workshops in the country, aimed at providing conceptual learning about medicine and surgeries to students and participants. Start Up Festivals and Hackathons - Some of the notable annual events that are held at Parul University for technical students include Vadodara Innofest, Vadodara Police Hackathon, Projections.

Cultural Events - Some of the notable annual cultural events that are held at Parul University include Vadodara Literature Festival and Maadhyam Media Fest, Vadodara Fashion Week, IIMUN Vadodara Conclave, the Vadodara Film and Design Festival VFDF, PUTalks among other major events.

== International community ==
Parul University has over 2,500 international students from 68 countries and is in partnership with 50 international universities facilitating nearly 1050 students, through various exchange programs. The university also has tie-up with Poland for placement and internship opportunities for the students during and after their academic courses. The university offers scholarships to international students and its International Relationship cell provides international students guidance further scholarships for higher education. In 2023, the university organised International Week to promote global academic practises amongst nations.

Parul University hosts over 100 students and faculty members from various regions including Europe, Asia, North America, and South America through its mobility and summer school programs, notably the Indian Summer School (ISS). The university's collaborations with the Indian Council for Cultural Relations (ICCR) have facilitated international cultural events, including performances by a South Korean classical folk instrumental group, a Ramayana performance from Nepal, and the Hakuna Matata performers from Africa

== Alumni community ==
The university has a global alumni network with over 30,000 student alumni who have made contributions across multiple sectors and industries. Alumni include honorary Doctor of Literature (D.Litt.) Anil Kumble and Manushi Chillar.

Laxita Sandilea, women's athlete and a student of Parul University, won the silver medal in the 1500-meter event for India at the prestigious Asian U20 Athletics Championship held in Dubai.

== Rankings and awards ==
- Parul University was ranked 53rd in Pharmacy by NIRF 2023.
- Best Private University in Western India at National Education Excellence Awards 2017 by Praxis Media.
- Best University in Placements by Associated Chambers of Commerce of India (ASSOCHAM)
- Parul University was ranked 41st in Pharmacy by NIRF 2025
