= Institute of Infrastructure Technology Research and Management =

University in Gujarat, India

- Type: Public University
- Established: 2013; 13 years ago
- Chairman: Sudhir K. Jain
- Director: Mukesh Kumar Barua
- Registrar: Shri Ram Babu Bhagat
- Location: Ahmedabad, Gujarat, India; 23°00′15″N 72°37′19″E
- Campus: Urban
- Acronym: IITRAM
- Director General: Prof. Pramod K Jain
- Website: iitram.ac.in

Institute of Infrastructure Technology Research and Management (also known as IITRAM) is an autonomous state university located in Ahmedabad, Gujarat, India. Established in 2013, the IITRAM campus is located in Maninagar in the eastern part of Ahmedabad which was an important center of trade and commerce due to its strategic location on the banks of the Sabarmati River.

== History ==
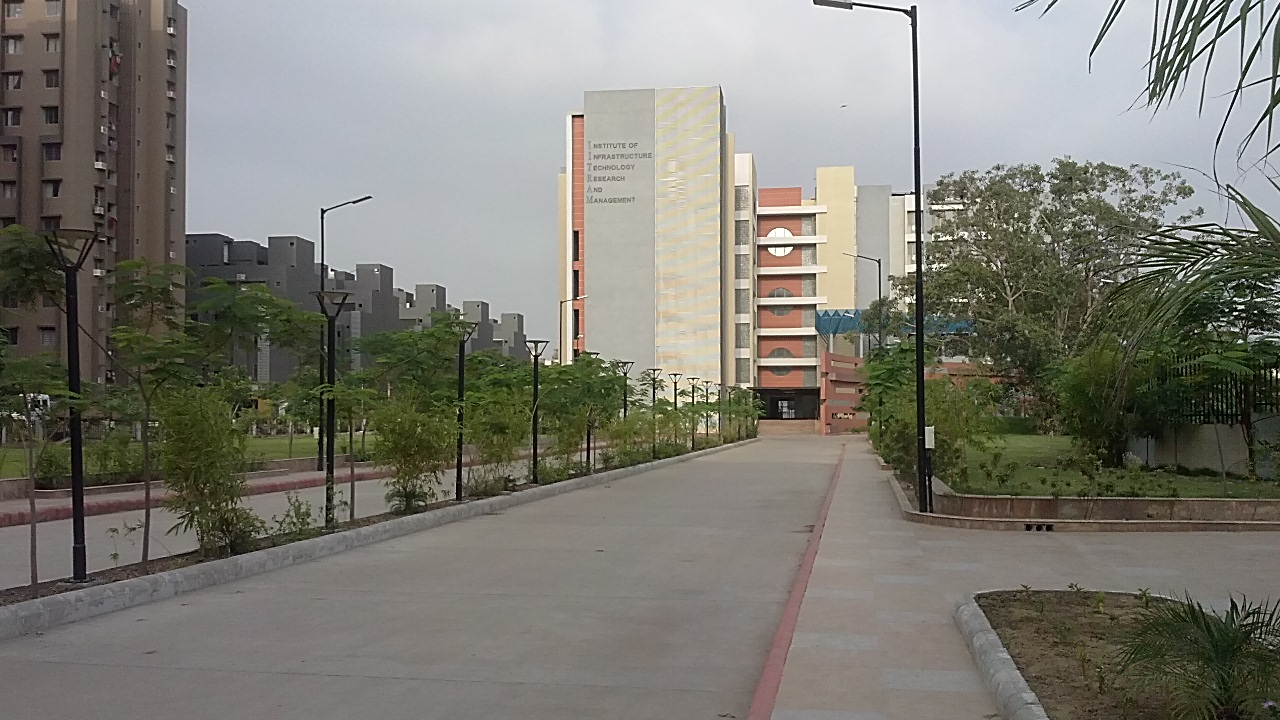
IITRAM

IITRAM was established by the Government of Gujarat, through IITRAM Act No. 5, 2013. The first batch of students was admitted in 2013 to these programs: Civil Engineering and Electrical Engineering. In 2014 Mechanical Engineering department was established. IITRAM was inaugurated by former Deputy PM of India and Lok Sabha MP from Gandhinagar L. K. Advani.

IITRAM offers Bachelor and Master of Technology programs in Civil Engineering, Computer Engineering, Electrical Engineering and Mechanical Engineering. The Institute also offers Ph.D. studies in various fields in Basic Sciences, Engineering, Humanities and Social Sciences.

The campus houses research facilities and Centers of Excellence funded by Government of Gujarat.

== Academics ==
IITRAM Ahmedabad offers Bachelor of Technology programs in various fields of Engineering namely Civil Engineering, Computer Science and Engineering, Electrical Engineering and Mechanical Engineering. 50% Admission to these programs is through taking Academic Council for Professional Courses (ACPC) and rest Admission to these programs is through taking Joint Entrance Examination – Main (JEE – Mains). The institute also offers Masters and Ph.D. studies in various fields in Engineering, Basic Sciences, Humanities, and Social Sciences. Admissions to these graduate programmes are through written test and/or interviews.

Sum of Rs 12 crore has been allocated to IITRAM to start Department of Advance Defence Technology in collaboration with DRDO.

== Rankings ==
University rankings

Engineering – India
- NIRF (2024): 201-300

The National Institutional Ranking Framework (NIRF) ranked the college between 201-300 in the engineering rankings in 2024.

== Departments ==
- Basic Sciences
- Civil Engineering
- Computer Engineering
- Electrical Engineering
- Humanities and Social Sciences
- Mechanical and Aerospace Engineering

== Minor Programs ==
- Drone Technology
- Computer Science and Engineering

== Centers of Excellence ==
- Siemens
- Advanced Defense Technologies
- Artificial Intelligence and Machine Learning
- Drone Technology
- Aerospace and Defense

== Campus Life ==
IITRAM provides sports facilities, gymnasium and trainer on the field.

The campus is Wi-Fi enabled. Students at IITRAM are engaged in internship programs, research alongside extra-curricular activities.
