= Silver Oak University =

Indian private university

- Motto: ज्ञानं परमं भूषणम्
- Type: Private
- Established: 2009
- Founder: Mr. Shital O. Agrawal
- Accreditation: NAAC Grade A
- Affiliations: UGC
- President: Mr. Shital O. Agrawal
- Vice-president: Mr. Janak P. Khandwala
- Provost: Dr. Saurin R. Shah
- Students: 25000+
- Location: Nr. Bhavik Publication, Gota, Ahmedabad, Gujarat, India; 23.091730452114128°N 72.5349336098118°E
- Nickname: SOU
- Website: www.silveroakuni.ac.in

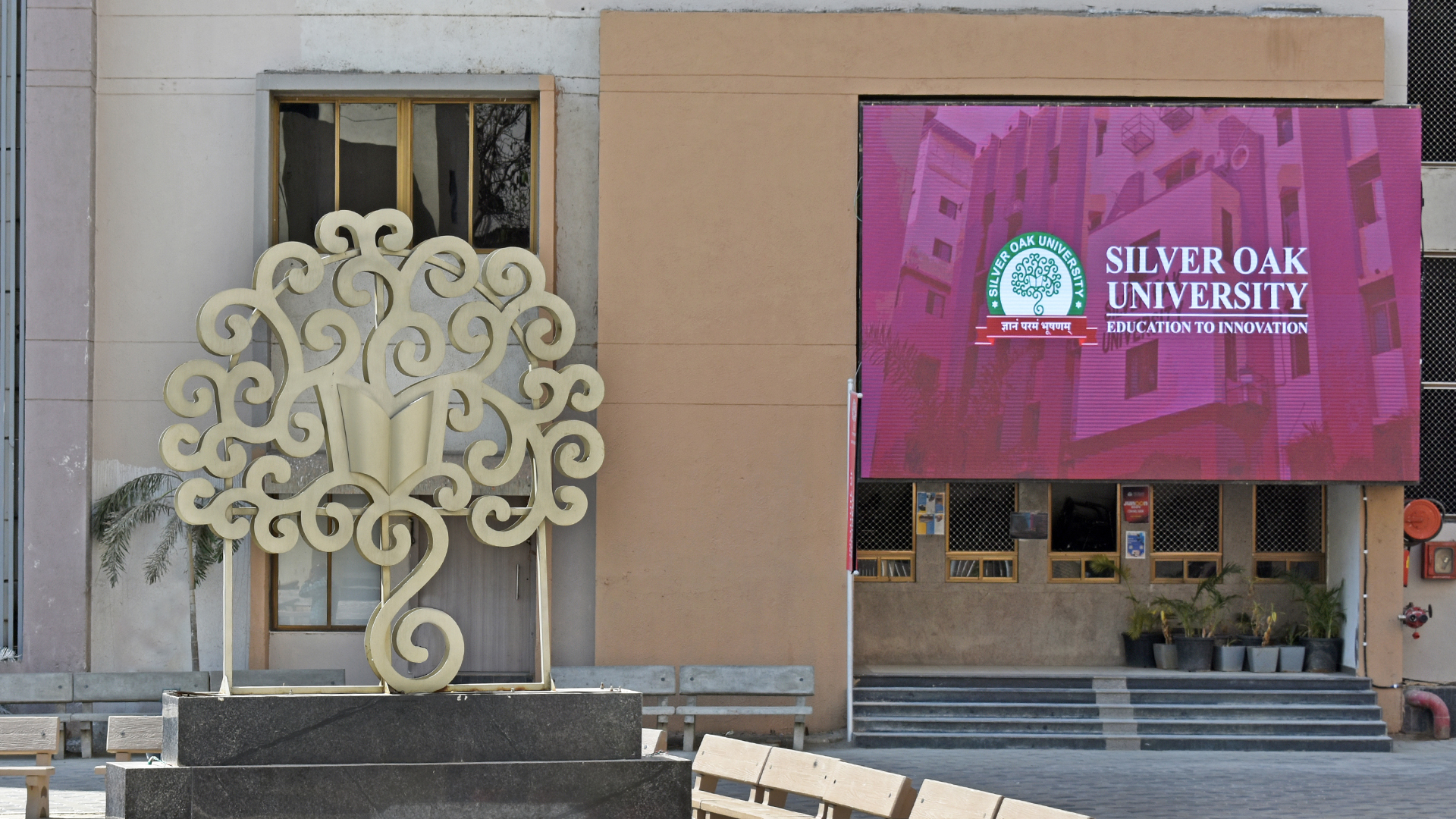
- A campus landmark featuring the university's tree sculpture at Silver Oak University, Ahmedabad, Gujarat, India.

Silver Oak University is a private university located in Ahmedabad, Gujarat, India. The university was recognised by the University Grants Commission (UGC) in 2019 after being declared a State Private University under the Gujarat Private Universities Act, 2009. Its origins trace back to 2009 when it was established as an affiliated college. Over time, it expanded into the Silver Oak Group of Institutes and later evolved into a multidisciplinary university.

The university offers diploma, undergraduate, postgraduate and doctoral programmes across engineering, technology, management, commerce, design, law, science, humanities, healthcare and allied disciplines. More than 25,000 students study across its constituent colleges and institutes.

In May 2025, Silver Oak University received Grade A accreditation from the National Assessment and Accreditation Council (NAAC). The university describes itself as the youngest university in Ahmedabad to achieve this distinction.

Silver Oak University has received several academic rankings and recognitions. It was ranked 7th among the Top Engineering Colleges in India by The Times of India. It was also recognised as the "Most Innovative Engineering College" by 94.3 My FM. The university received the Times Education Icon Gujarat 2024 Award for Excellence in Innovation. Silver Oak Institute of Design, a constituent institute of the university, received the Times Education Icon Gujarat 2024 Award for Promoting Indian Arts. The university and its constituent institutes have also earned recognition under the National Intellectual Property Awareness Mission (NIPAM) and various research and innovation initiatives.

The university has also been featured in regional and national rankings. THE WEEK ranked it 12th among colleges in the West Zone. Its engineering institutions have received recognition under the Gujarat State Institutional Ranking Framework (GSIRF).

== History ==
Silver Oak University traces its origins to 2009, when it operated as an affiliated group of colleges in Ahmedabad, Gujarat, known as the Silver Oak Group of Institutes. In 2019, it was recognised as a State Private University under the Gujarat Private Universities Act, 2009, and was listed by the University Grants Commission (UGC).

== Motto and Identity ==
The university's motto, Gyanam Paramam Bhushanam ("Knowledge is the Highest Virtue"), is drawn from Sanskrit and reflects its stated academic philosophy. The university also has an official Kulgeet (institutional anthem) performed at convocations and major institutional events.

== Academic Structure ==
Silver Oak University is organised into faculties and constituent colleges/institutes offering undergraduate, postgraduate, doctoral, diploma, and vocational programmes across the following broad disciplines "150+:

- Engineering and Technology
- Computer Applications
- Management (including PGDM and MBA programmes)
- Commerce
- Science (Biotechnology, Microbiology, Chemistry, Physics)
- Humanities and Social Science
- Design (Fashion, Interior, Product, Communication Design)
- Animation and Multimedia
- Aviation Technology (DGCA-approved programmes)
- Pharmacy
- Nursing
- Physiotherapy
- Allied Health Sciences (Optometry, Medical Laboratory Technology, Public Health)
- Law
- Liberal and Professional Studies
- Vocational Education

== Recognitions and Regulatory Approvals ==
According to the university, its constituent institutes hold approvals/recognitions from the following bodies:

- University Grants Commission (UGC)
- All India Council for Technical Education (AICTE)
- Pharmacy Council of India (PCI)
- Indian Nursing Council (INC)
- Directorate General of Civil Aviation (DGCA)
- National Board of Accreditation (NBA)
- Bar Council of India (BCI)
- Association of Indian Universities (AIU)

== Campus ==
The university campus is located in the Gota area of Ahmedabad and includes academic buildings, laboratories, a library, hostel accommodation, and student activity facilities.

== Research Centres ==
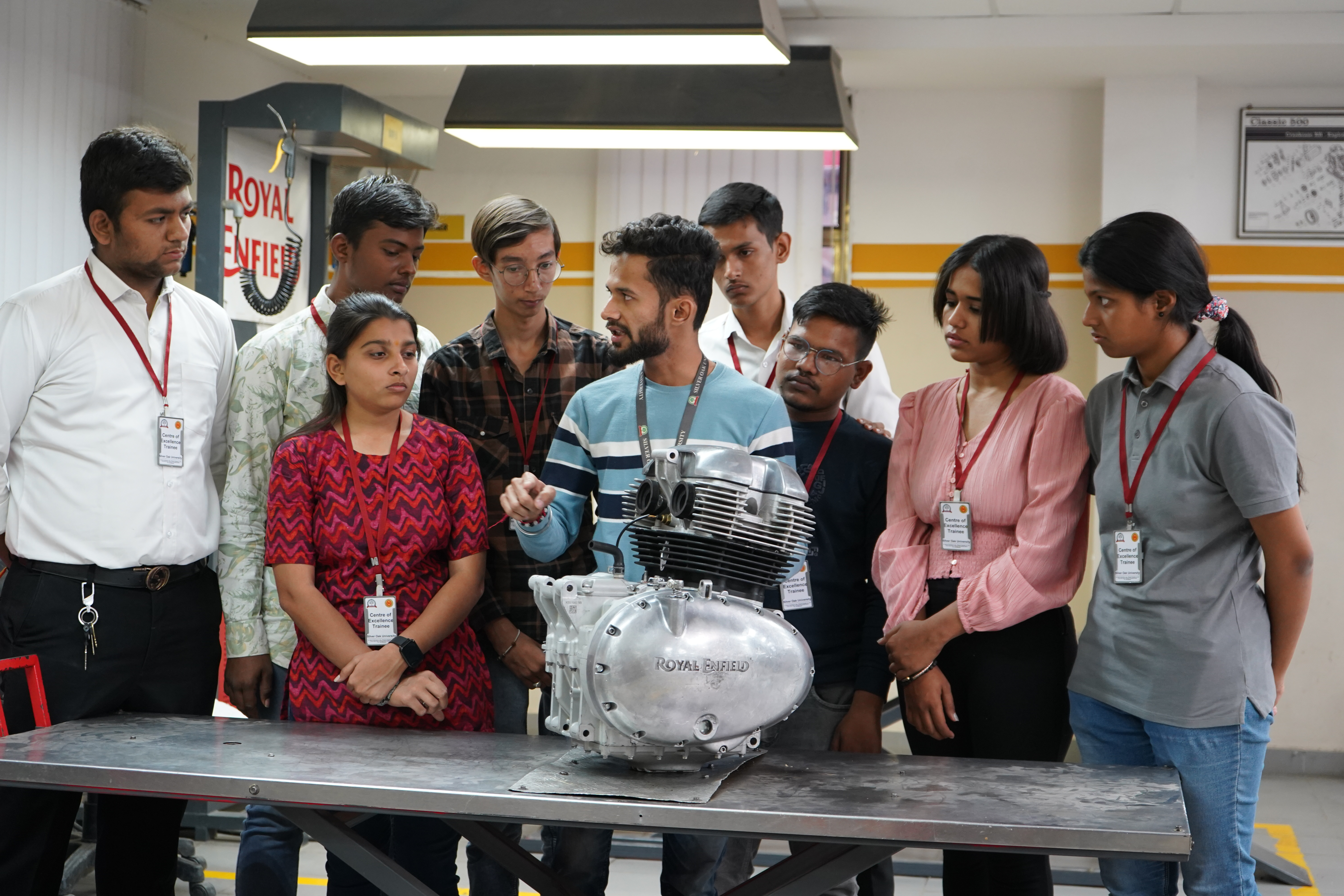
Students receive practical training on a Royal Enfield motorcycle engine at the Royal Enfield Centre of Excellence at Silver Oak University, Ahmedabad.

The university operates several industry-affiliated "Centres of Excellence," reportedly in partnership with companies including Intas Pharmaceuticals, Royal Enfield, Fronius, and UltraTech Cement, focused on pharmaceutical training, automotive engineering, welding technology, and construction materials respectively.

== Student Life ==
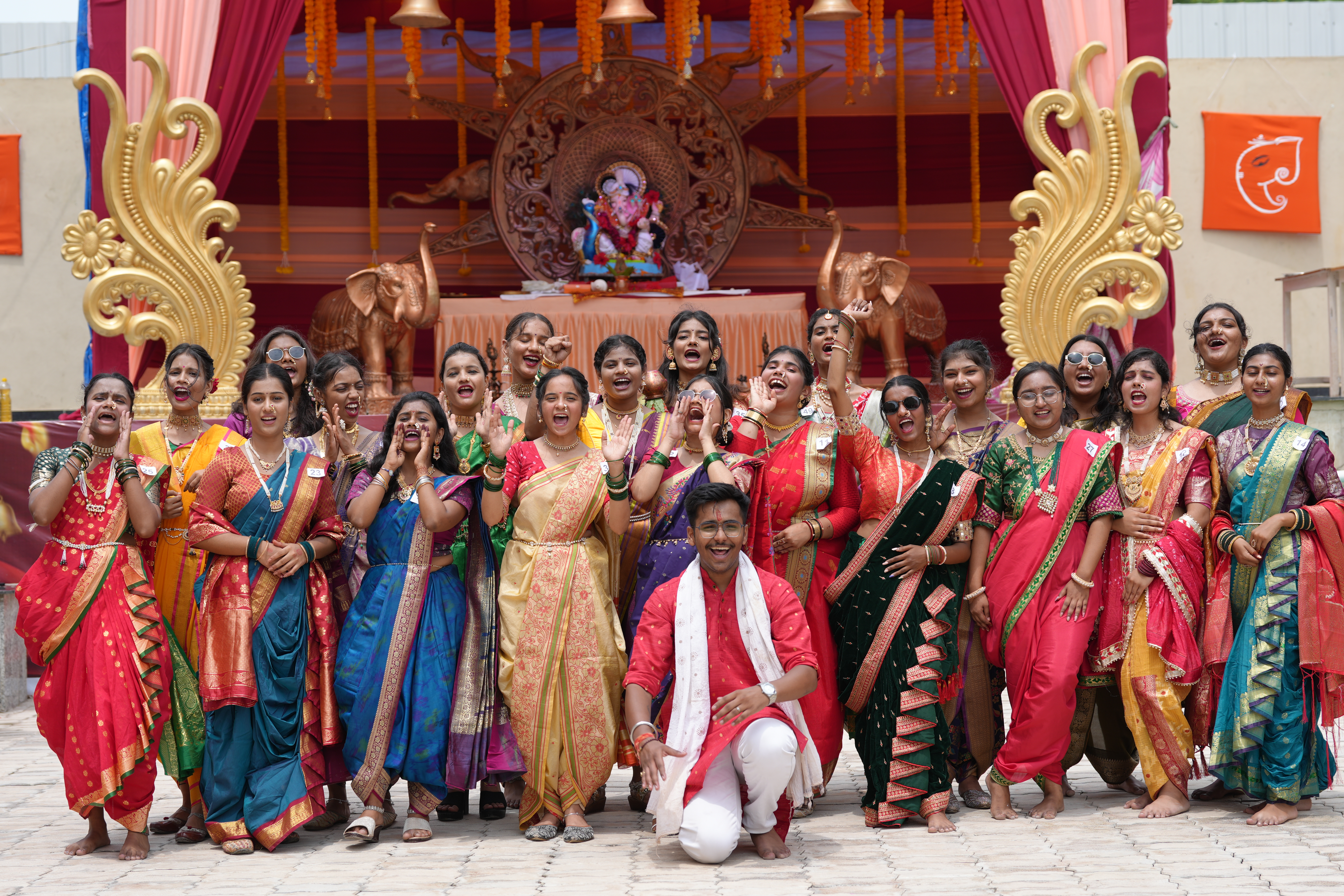
Students in traditional attire participate in a Ganesh Chaturthi celebration at Silver Oak University, Ahmedabad.

Silver Oak University organises a range of annual student activities, documented on the university's official galleries page. These include:

- Junoon — an annual cultural festival
- Kalpvruksh — a multidisciplinary technical and innovation conclave
- Rangmanch — a performing arts event for first-year students
- Prarambh — an induction/orientation programme for new students
- Raas Rasiya — an annual Navratri celebration
- Convocation — annual degree ceremony
- Foundation Day and Independence Day celebrations
- Activities through the National Service Scheme (NSS), National Cadet Corps (NCC), and Bharat Scouts and Guides (BSG)
- MAD Fair was organised by the Silver Oak Institute of Management (SOIM) – MBA Department to commemorate World Entrepreneurs’ Day.

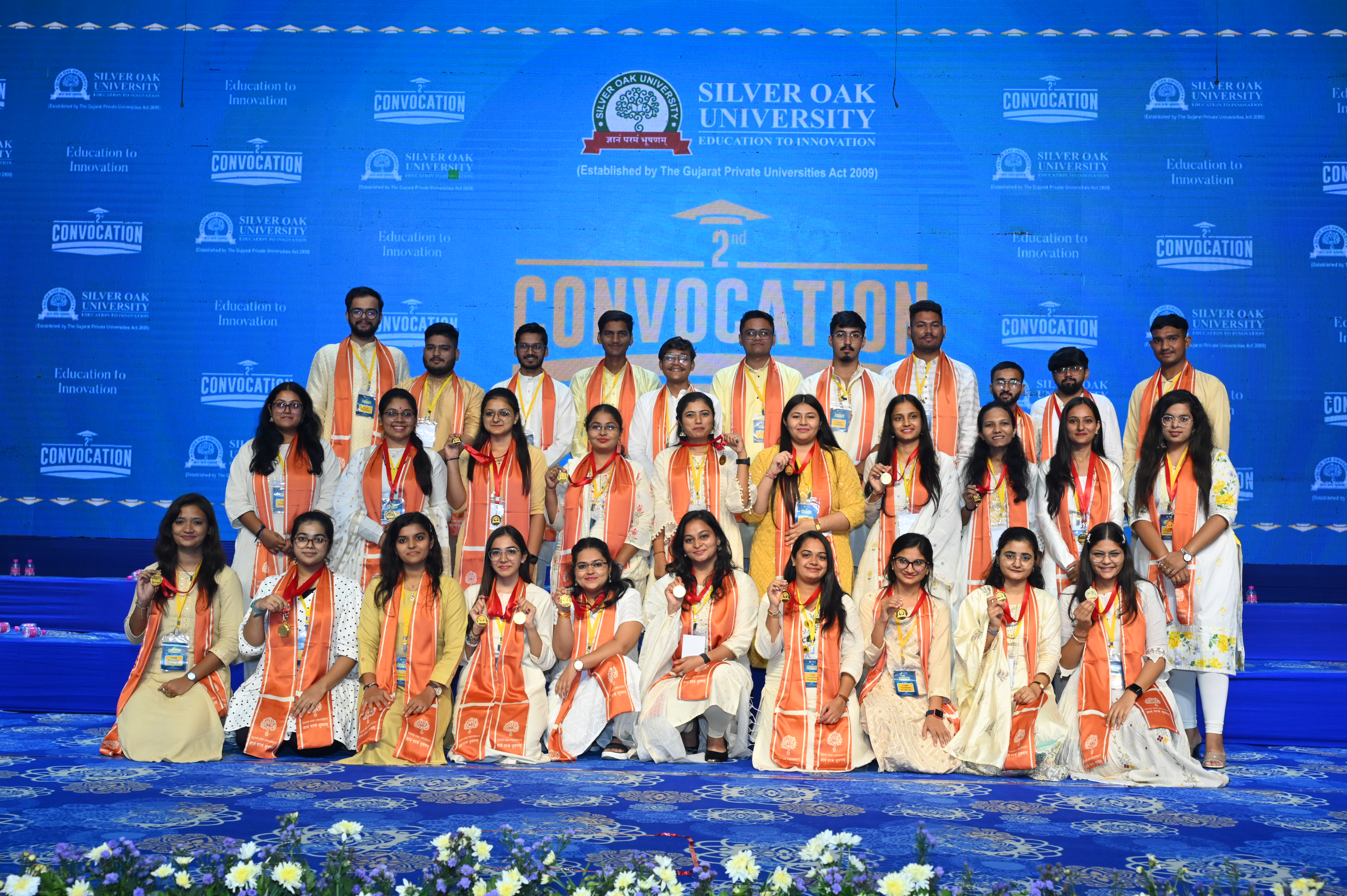
Graduates pose with their medals during the 2nd Convocation Ceremony at Silver Oak University, Ahmedabad.

- A Sports Gallery documenting inter-collegiate and institutional sporting events

== Controversy ==
In January 2022, Silver Oak University was the subject of protests against charging its students unlisted fees for ID cards.

On 7 September 2022, Silver Oak University was raided by the Income Tax Department on suspicion of tax evasion and undocumented contributions to political parties. These investigations were conducted shortly before the school's graduation ceremony, expected to be held on 24 September. Students had been placed on leave and the campus evacuated as investigations continued on the university's campus.
