= European Association for Distance Learning =

The European Association for Distance Learning (EADL), formerly the Association of European Correspondence Schools, is an international organization organized for the exchange of information and ideas on distance education. It comprises schools, institutions and individuals working in the field of distance education located in more than 20 European countries including the majority of European Community states, plus Iceland, Norway, Russia, Switzerland and Turkey.
