= Thaltej =

- city
- Location in Gujarat, India Thaltej (India)
- Coordinates: 23.06741°N 72.5121°E
- Country: India
- State: Gujarat
- District: Ahmedabad

Population (2001)
  - Total: 42,699

Languages
  - Official: Gujarati, Hindi
- Time zone: UTC+5:30 (IST)
- Vehicle registration: GJ
- Website: gujaratindia.com

Thaltej is a census town and a suburb in Ahmedabad district in the Indian state of Gujarat. The town comes under Ward No:8, North West Zone of Ahmedabad Municipal Corporation, the civic body that governs the City of Ahmedabad.

== Demographics ==
As of 2001 India census, Thaltej had a population of 42,699. Males constitute 55% of the population and females 47%. Thaltej has an average literacy rate of 80%, higher than the national average of 59.5%: male literacy is 84%, and female literacy is 77%. In Thaltej, 10% of the population is under 6 years of age.

== Geography ==
Thaltej village is situated around a lake on the far western edge of Ahmedabad. Since the city has continued to expand outward, development pressure has increased in the area and the lake has recently become an interest to the Ahmedabad Municipal Corporation (AMC) and the Ahmedabad Urban Development Authority (AUDA) as a potential redevelopment project. Currently, the lake is surrounded by a large slum population who has lived around the water body for 25–35 years. In addition, the lake and the surrounding areas are extremely polluted. The lake's total storage capacity is 32.2 crore liters and the circumference is 1617 meters. Desilting area is 107393m3.

== History ==
The village of Thaltej and surrounding areas were originally inhabited by members of low castes who were known for social crimes. This, along with its distance from the center of Ahmedabad hindered its development as a suburb of Ahmedabad in the late 20th century.
