= National Institute of Mass Communication and Journalism =

University in Gujarat, India

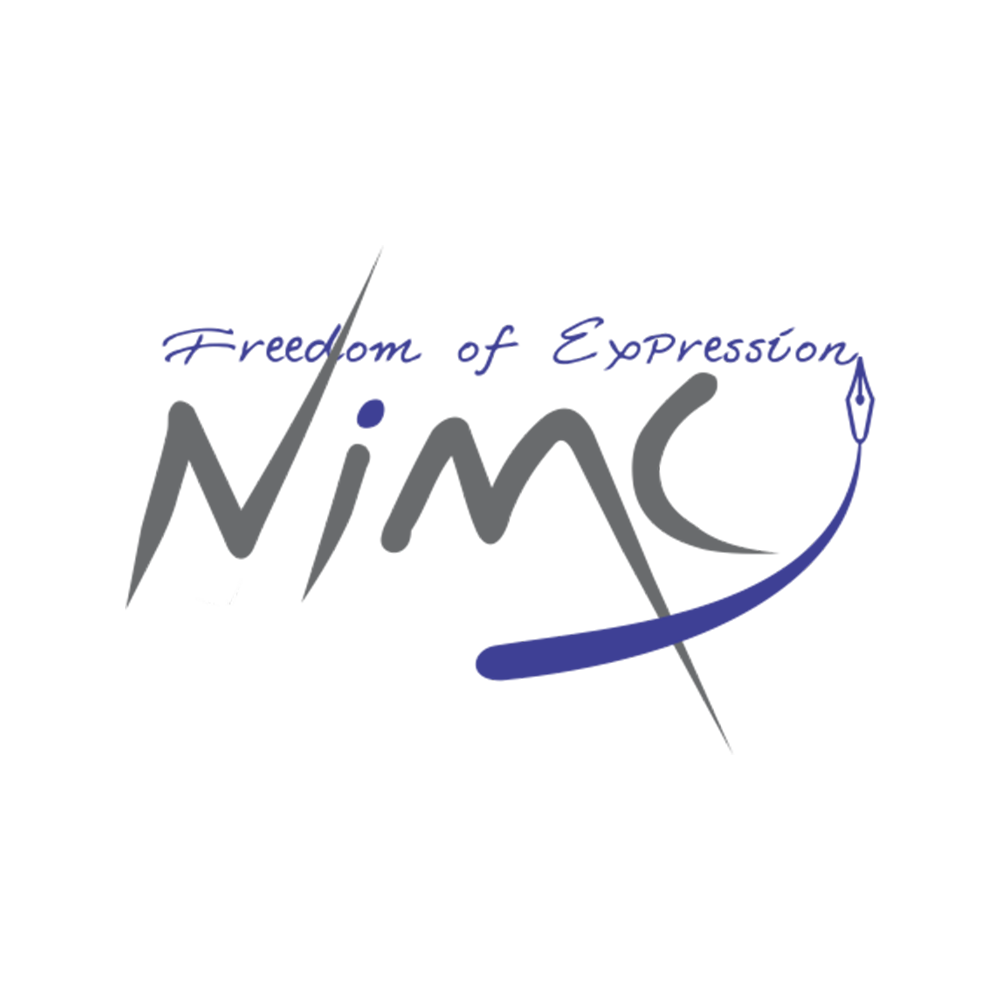
- Motto: Freedom of Expression
- Founder: Vishwa Samwad Education Foundation
- Established: 2007
- Location: Ahmedabad, Gujarat, India
- Coordinates: 23.035841°N 72.511390°E
- Interactive map of National Institute of Mass Communication and Journalism
- Website: www.nimcj.org

NIMCJ, formerly National Institute of Mass Communications and Journalism, Ahmedabad is a higher education institute for Mass Communication in India. It was established by Vishwa Samvad Education Foundation in 2007. It is located at Bodakdev, Sarkhej–Gandhinagar Highway, the western Indian city of Ahmedabad. NIMCJ is the pioneer institute to introduce Radio Journalism and Digital Media in media academics in Gujarat. The institute is affiliated to Gujarat University.

== History ==
NIMCJ was established in 2007 by Vishwa Samvad Education Foundation.

== Academics ==
NIMCJ is affiliated to Gujarat University and offers MAJMC, BAJMC and BAJMC (HONS.)* programs. The Master of Arts, Journalism and Mass Communication (MAJMC) is a full-time, two-year master's program that focuses on the study of journalism and mass communication theories, practices, and techniques. Bachelor of Arts, Journalism and Mass Communication (BAJMC) is a full-time bachelor's program available in three-year and BAJMC (HONS.)* a four-year duration program. Both concentrate on media study and its professional skills.

== Ranking ==
NIMCJ was ranked 13th in 2018, 14th in 2019, 22nd in 2020, and 24th in 2021 in Outlook India's ranking of top mass communication colleges in India. The institute was also ranked by India Today, placing 34th in 2019, 31st in 2020, 33rd in 2021, 10th in 2022, 33rd in 2023, 29th in 2024, 33rd in 2025 and 30th in 2026among mass communication colleges in India. In 2026, NIMCJ was ranked 9th among the Best Emerging Mass Communication Colleges in India by India Today. Additionally, NIMCJ was featured in OPEN Magazine's list of the best colleges in 2022 and 2023 and was noted as the only media institute from Gujarat to be included.

== Award ==
NIMCJ Awarded by Education Department and Knowledge Consortium of Gujarat (KCG) - Government of Gujarat for "Excellence in Placement". In 2021, NIMCJ received Quality Assurance Award for higher education by Indian Quality Assurance Council (IQAC) and Indian Society for Training and Development (ISTD).

== NIMCaR ==
The RSS-promoted trust, VSEF - Vishwa Samvad Education Foundation, already runs a media institute in Ahmedabad since 2007 via National Institute of Mass Communication and Journalism (NIMCJ). It will be amalgamated into National Institute of Mass Communication and Research (NIMCaR) that will come up in Hajipur village, about 32 km from Ahmedabad.

VSEF will spend Rs 100 crore to set up a National Media Institute in Gujarat across a 10-acre campus equipped with the technologically advanced studio, Media Research Centre, Media Museum and other facilities with the aim to transform media and communication education in India.
