= List of institutions of higher education in Bengaluru =

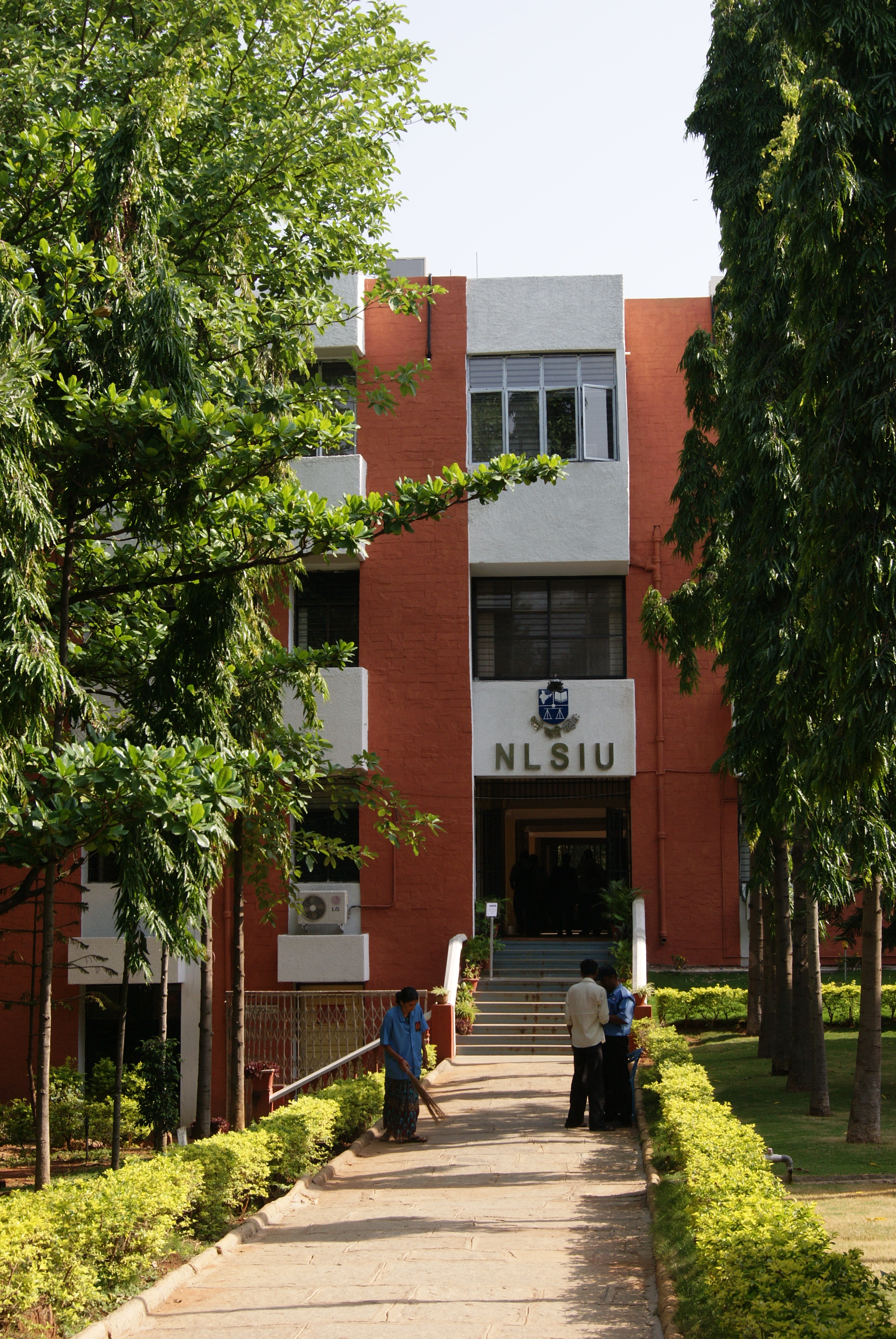
National Law School of India University, ranked one in India, is called by a few as the 'Harvard of the East'.

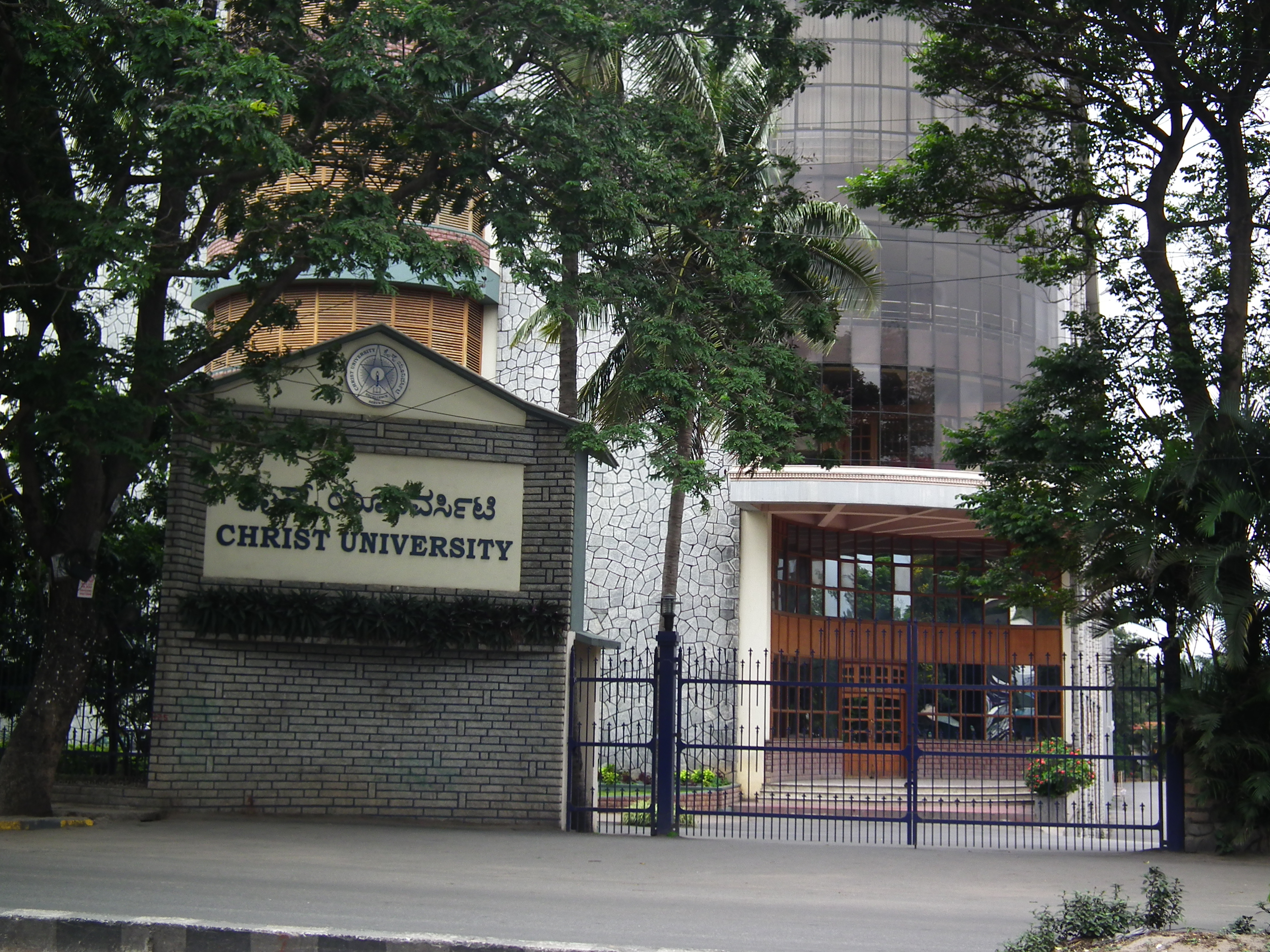
Christ University

Bangalore University, established in 1886, provides affiliation to over 500 colleges, with a total student enrolment exceeding 300,000. The university has two campuses within Bengaluru – Jnanabharathi and Central College. The Erstwhile UVCE, established in the year 1917, by Bharat Ratna Sir M. Visvesvaraya is now a Public state University of Visvesvaraya College of Engineering. Bengaluru also has many private Engineering Colleges affiliated to Visvesvaraya Technological University. The Bangalore University was Trifurcated in the year 2017 for the proper management of the students & Colleges then the Bangalore University was Trifurcated in Bangalore University, Bengaluru North University and Bengaluru City University.

Some of the institutes in Bengaluru which are the premier institutes for scientific research and study in India are:

- Indian Institute of Astrophysics
- Indian Institute of Science, which was established in 1909 in Bangalore
- Jawaharlal Nehru Centre for Advanced Scientific Research (JNCASR),
- National Centre for Biological Sciences (NCBS)
- National Institute of Mental Health and Neuro Sciences (NIMHANS)
- Raman Research Institute
- Institute of Bioinformatics, Bengaluru (IOB)
- National Institute of Advanced Studies (NIAS)

Nationally renowned professional institutes located in Bengaluru include

- Indian Institute of Management, Bangalore (IIM-B),
- Indian Statistical Institute
- Institute of Wood Science and Technology,
- International Institute of Information Technology, Bangalore (IIIT-B)
- National Institute of Design(NID),
- National Institute of Fashion Technology (NIFT),
- National Law School of India University (NLSIU),
- University of Agricultural Sciences, Bangalore (UASB)

== Universities ==
- Alliance University
- Amrita Vishwa Vidyapeetham
- Azim Premji University
- Bangalore University
- Bengaluru City University
- Bengaluru North University
- Christ (Deemed to be University)
- CMR University
- CMR Institute of Technology
- Dayananda Sagar University
- Garden City University
- Jain University
- Karnataka State Law University
- Kristu Jayanti University
- University Of Liverpool (Bengaluru campus)
- Manipal (Deemed to be University)
- Mount Carmel University
- NITTE University
- PES University
- Presidency University
- Rajiv Gandhi University of Health Sciences
- Ramaiah University of Applied Sciences
- REVA University
- RV University
- Symbiosis International University
- St. Joseph's University
- University of Agricultural Sciences
- University of New South Wales (Bengaluru campus)
- Visvesvaraya Technological University

== Design ==
- Jain University, (School of Design, Media and Creative Arts)
- Jyoti Nivas College, (Visual Communication & Performing Arts, Media)
- National Institute of Design (NID), R&D Campus (M.Des, DDE, DRE, IID)
- National Institute of Fashion Technology (B.Des, B.F.Tech)
- REVA University
- Srishti School of Art, Design and Technology (Foundation Studies, Prof Diploma, Advanced Diploma)
- Strate School of Design ( M.Sc, B.Sc in Design)

== Arts ==
- Jyoti Nivas College
- School of Humanities & Social Sciences, Mount Carmel (Deemed-to-be University)

== Management ==
- AIMS Institutes
- Alliance University - Alliance School of Business
- Christ University Bangalore School of Business and Management
- Indian Institute of Management
- Jagdish Sheth School of Management
- Jain University - Center for Management Studies (BBA)
- Jyoti Nivas College
- School of Business and Management, Kristu Jayanti (Deemed to be University)
- School Of Management Studios, Mount Carmel (Deemed-to-be University)
- NITTE University - NITTE School of Management
- M.S.Ramaiah Institute of Management (MBA, PGDM)
- REVA University
- Sri Bhagawan Mahaveer Jain College (BBA, MBA + PGPM, PG Diploma (Enterprise Management + PGDM), PGDBM)
- St. Hopkins College
- St Joseph's Institute of Management
- SVKM'S NMIMS (PGDM, BBA, B.Sc. Finance, B.Sc. Economics)
- Symbiosis International University
- WE School (PGDM)
- Xavier Institute of Management and Entrepreneurship

== Commerce ==
- Christ University School of Commerce, Finance & Accountancy
- Jyoti Nivas College
- School of Commerce, Accounting & Finance,Kristu Jayanti (Deemed to be University)
- School Of Commerce, Mount Carmel (Deemed-to-be University)
- Presidency College
- REVA University
- St. Joseph's College of Commerce

== Engineering ==
- Acharya Institute of Technology
- Alliance University - Alliance College of Engineering and Design
- AMC Engineering College
- B.M.S. College of Engineering/ Bhusanayana Mukundadas Sreenivasaiah College of Engineering
- B.M.S. Institute of Technology and Management/ Bhusanayana Mukundadas Sreenivasaiah Institute of Technology and Management
- Bangalore Institute of Technology
- BNM Institute of Technology
- Brindavan College of Engineering
- BTL Institute of Technology
- CMR Institute of Technology
- CMR University
- Dayananda Sagar College of Engineering
- Dayananda Sagar University
- Don Bosco Institute of Technology
- Global Academy of Technology
- HKBK College of Engineering
- JSS Academy of Technical Education
- M. S. Ramaiah University of Applied Sciences
- MVJ College of Engineering
- New Horizon College of Engineering
- Oxford College of Engineering
- PES University
- Presidency University
- R.V. College of Engineering
- RV University
- Ramaiah Institute of Technology
- REVA University
- RNS Institute of Technology
- Sambhram Institute of Technology
- Sapthagiri College of Engineering
- Shri Pillappa College of Engineering
- Sri Sairam College of Engineering
- Sri Venkateshwara College of Engineering
- Swami Vivekananda Yoga Anusandhana Samsthana (Global City Campus - academic programs offered in affiliation with Bosscoder School of Technology)
- T John Institute of Technology
- University Visvesvaraya College of Engineering
- Vivekananda Institute of Technology

== Law ==
- Christ University - School of Law
- KLE Society's Law College
- Kristu Jayanti College of law
- National Law School of India University
- Presidency University
- REVA University
- St. Joseph's University, Bangalore
- University Law College, Bangalore University, Bangalore University

== Medical ==
- Bangalore Medical College and Research Institute
- Institute of Public Health Bengaluru
- Kempegowda Institute of Medical Sciences (KIMS)
- National Institute of Mental Health and Neuro Sciences
- Rajarajeswari Medical College and Hospital
- Sri Jayadeva Institute of Cardiovascular Sciences and Research
- St. John's Medical College
- Vydehi Institute of Medical Sciences and Research Centre

== Sciences ==
- Christ University
- Indian Institute of Astrophysics
- Indian Institute of Horticultural Research
- Indian Institute of Science
- Indian Statistical Institute
- Institute of Wood Science and Technology
- Jawaharlal Nehru Centre for Advanced Scientific Research
- Jyoti Nivas College
- School Of Natural And Applied Sciences, Mount Carmel (Deemed-to-be University)
- National Tuberculosis Institute
- The Oxford College of Science
- REVA University
- School of Biological & Forensic Science, Kristu Jayanti (Deemed to be University)
- School of Computational & Physical Sciences,Kristu Jayanti (Deemed to be University)
- St. Joseph's University

== Others ==
- College of Fine Arts, Bengaluru
- Jyoti Nivas College
- National College, Bengaluru
- Sri Bhagawan Mahaveer Jain College
