= List of institutions of higher education in Karnataka =

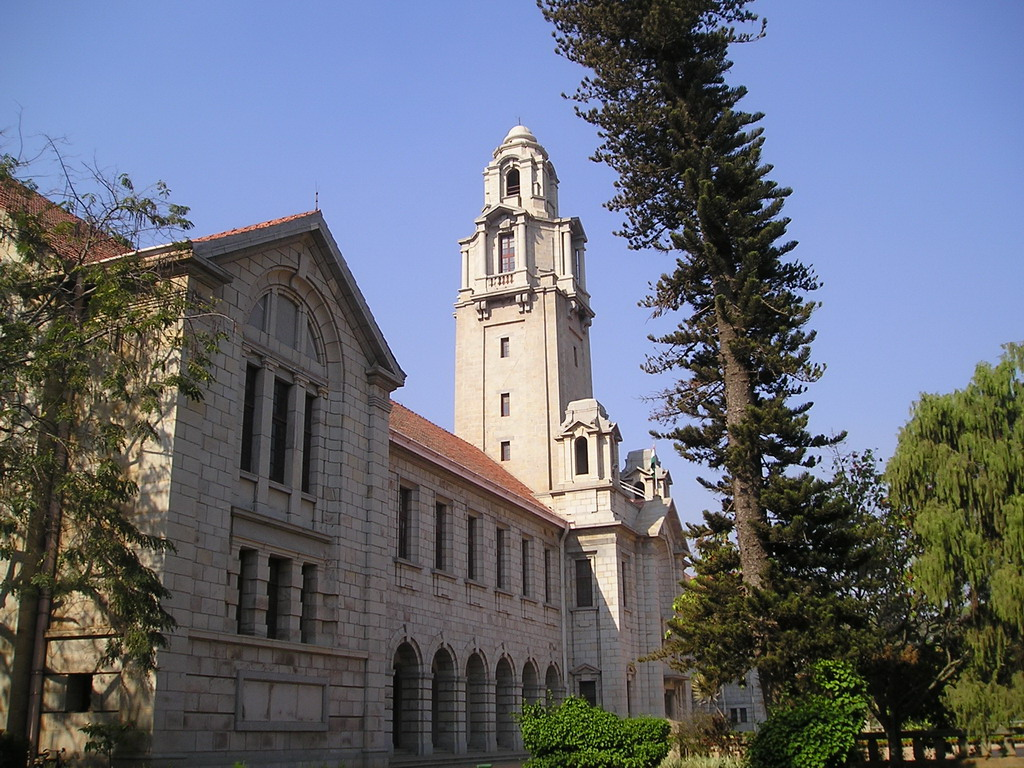
Main building of the Indian Institute of Science

This page is a list of higher education institutions in Karnataka that grant academic degrees. This page lists Institutes of National Importance, Institutes of Eminence, Central Universities, Deemed Universities, State Universities and Private Universities.

== Institutes of National Importance ==
Institution	Location	Type	Founded
Indian Institute of Management Bangalore	Bengaluru	Management	1973
National Institute of Technology Surathkal	Mangaluru	Engineering	1960
Indian Institute of Technology Dharwad	Dharwad	Engineering, Technology and Science	2016
National Institute of Mental Health and Neurosciences	Bengaluru	Medicine	1847
Indian Institute of Information Technology	Dharwad	Information Technology	2015
Indian Institute of Information Technology	Raichur	Information Technology	2019
National Forensic Sciences University	Dharwad	Forensic Sciences	2023

== Institutes of Eminence ==
Institution	Location	Type	Established
Indian Institute of Science (IISc)	Bengaluru	Research	1909
Manipal Academy of Higher Education (MAHE)	Manipal	Research	1953

Indian Institute of Science & Manipal Academy of Higher Education are considered as deemed to be university.

== List of Top 10 colleges & University ranked under NIRF ==
=== Colleges ===
Rank	College Name	NIRF Rank (2025)	NIRF Rank(2024)	Location	Affiliated University
2	Kristu Jayanti (Deemed to be University )	34	60	Bengaluru	Deemed to be University
3	M S Ramaiah College of Arts, Science, and Commerce	67	NIL	Bengaluru	Bengaluru City University
4	St Aloysius (Deemed to be University)	73	58	Mangaluru	Deemed to be University
5	St. Joseph's College of Commerce	98	55	Bengaluru	Bengaluru City University
6	Mount Carmel College	NIL	68	Bengaluru	Bengaluru City University
7	Jyoti Nivas College	NIL	72	Bengaluru	Bengaluru City University
8	NMKRV College for Women	NIL	85	Bengaluru	Bengaluru City University
9	MES College of Arts, Commerce and Science	NIL	90	Bengaluru	Bengaluru City University
10	Maharani Lakshmi Ammanni College for Women	NIL	95	Bengaluru	Bengaluru City University
11	Seshadripuram College	NIL	98	Bengaluru	Bengaluru City University
12	BMS College for Women/ Bhusanayana Mukundadas Sreenivasaiah College for Women	NIL	100	Bengaluru	Bengaluru City University

NIL : Not there in NIRF TOP 100 List

==== University ====
Rank	University Name	University Type	NIRF Rank	Notable Affiliated Colleges
1	Indian Institute of Science (IISc), Bengaluru	Institute of National Importance	1	N/A (IISc is a standalone institution)
2	Manipal Academy of Higher Education, Manipal,	Deemed University	4	Manipal Institute of Technology (MIT), Manipal – NIRF Engineering Rank 56
3	JSS Academy of Higher Education and Research, Mysuru	Deemed University	24	JSS Medical College, Mysuru
4	Visvesvaraya Technological University (VTU), Belagavi	State Public University	47	Numerous engineering colleges across Karnataka, including B.M.S. College of Engineering, Bengaluru
5	University of Mysore, Mysuru	State Public University	54	Maharaja's College, Mysuru; St. Philomena's College, Mysuru
6	Christ University, Bengluru,	Deemed University	60	Christ College, Bengaluru
7	NITTE University, Mangalore	Deemed University	66	KS Hegde Medical Academy, NMAMIT
8	National Institute of Technology Karnataka (NITK), Surathkal	Institute of National Importance	67	N/A (NITK is a standalone institution)
9	Yenepoya University, Mangaluru	Deemed University	95	Yenepoya Medical College, Mangaluru
10	Alliance University, Bengaluru	Private University	98	Alliance School of Business, Alliance College of Engineering and Design
11	Jain University, Bengaluru	Deemed University	100	Center for Management Studies, School of Engineering and Technology

== University ==
=== Central ===
Name	Location	Type	Established
Central University of Karnataka	Kalaburagi	General	2009

=== State ===
University	Location	Type	Founded
Bagalkot University	Bagalkot	General	2023
Bangalore University	Bengaluru	General	1964
Bengaluru City University	Bengaluru	General	2017
Bengaluru Dr. B. R. Ambedkar School of Economics University	Bengaluru	General	2018
Bengaluru North University	Bengaluru	General	2017
University of Agricultural Sciences, Bangalore	Bengaluru	Agriculture	1964
National Law School of India University	Bengaluru	Law	1986
Rajiv Gandhi University of Health Sciences	Bengaluru	Medicine	1996
Karnataka Samskrit University	Bengaluru	Samskrit Language	2010
Kuvempu University	Shivamogga	General	1987
University of Agricultural and Horticultural Sciences, Shivamogga	Shivamogga	Agriculture and Horticulture	2013
Davangere University	Davanagere	General	2009
Gulbarga University	Kalaburgi	General	1980
Kannada University	Hampi	Cultural	1992
Karnatak University	Dharwad	General	1949
Karnataka Folklore University	Shiggavi	Folklore	2011
University of Agricultural Sciences, Dharwad	Dharwad	Agriculture	1986
Karnataka State Law University	Hubballi	Law	2009
Karnataka State Dr. Gangubhai Hangal Music and Performing Arts University	Mysuru	Music	2009
Karnataka State Open University	Mysuru	Open University	1996
Karnataka State Rural Development and Panchayat Raj University	Gadag	Rural Development	2016
Karnataka State Women's University	Vijayapura	Women's University	2003
Karnataka Veterinary, Animal and Fisheries Sciences University	Bidar	Veterinary Sciences	2005
Kodagu University	Kushalnagar	General	2014
Mangalore University	Mangaluru	General	1980
Mandya University	Mandya	General	2019
Rani Channamma University	Belagavi	General	2010
Tumkur University	Tumkuru	General	2004
University of Agricultural Sciences, Raichur	Raichur	Agriculture	2009
Raichur University	Raichur	General	2021
University of Horticultural Sciences, Bagalkot	Bagalkot	Horticulture	2010
University of Mysore	Mysuru	General	1916
Vijayanagara Sri Krishnadevaraya University	Ballari	General	2010
Visvesvaraya Technological University	Belagavi	Technical	1999
Bidar University	Bidar	General	2023

=== Private ===
University	Location	Founded
Adichunchanagiri University	Mandya	2018
Alliance University	Bengaluru	2010
Azim Premji University	Bengaluru	2010
Amity University Bengaluru	Bengaluru	2023
CMR University	Bengaluru	2013
Dayananda Sagar University	Bengaluru	2014
Garden City University	Bengaluru	1992
Institute of Trans-Disciplinary Health Sciences and Technology	Bengaluru	2013
Khaja Bandanawaz University	Kalburgi	2018
KLE Technological University	Hubballi	2015
M S Ramaiah University of Applied Sciences	Bengaluru	2013
PES University	Bengaluru	2013
Presidency University	Bengaluru	2013
Rai Technology University	Bengaluru	2013
REVA University	Bengaluru	2013
RV University	Bengaluru	2021
St. Joseph's University	Bengaluru	1882
Sharnbasva University	Kalaburagi	2017
Srinivas University	Mangaluru	2015

=== Deemed to be University ===
University	Location	Type	Founded	University status
BLDE University	Vijayapura	Medicine	1986	2008
Christ (Deemed to be University)	Bengaluru	General	1969	2008
International Institute of Information Technology	Bengaluru	Technology	1999	2005
Jagadguru Sri Shivarathreeshwara University	Mysuru	Medicine	1973	2008
Mount Carmel (Deemed-to-be University)	Bengaluru	General	1944(1948)	2026
Jain (Deemed to be University)	Bengaluru	General	1990	2008
Jawaharlal Nehru Centre for Advanced Scientific Research	Bengaluru	Research	1989	2002
Kristu Jayanti (Deemed to be University)	Bengaluru	General	1999	2025
K.L.E. Academy of Higher Education and Research	Belagavi	Medicine	1963	2006
Manipal Academy of Higher Education	Manipal	General	1953	1993
NITTE University	Mangaluru	Medicine	1979	2008
St Aloysius (Deemed to be University )	Mangaluru	General	1880	2024
Sri Devraj Urs Academy of Higher Education and Research	Kolara	Medicine	1986	2007
Sri Siddhartha Academy of Higher Education	Tumakuru	General	1979	2008
Swami Vivekananda Yoga Anusandhana Samsthana	Bengaluru	Yoga	2002	2002
Yenepoya University	Mangaluru	Medicine	1991	2008

=== Open University ===
University	Location	Type	Founded	University status
Indira Gandhi National Open University (IGNOU)	Delhi ,(Main Office) Bengaluru (have a regional Office in state of Karnataka)	Open (National)	1985	1985
Karnataka State Open University (KSOU)	Mysuru	Open (State)	1996	1996
Kuvempu University (Distance Education)	Shivamogga	Dual Mode (General + Distance)	1987	1987

== See also ==
- List of higher education institutions in Maharashtra
- List of institutions of higher education in Goa
- List of institutions of higher education in Tamil Nadu
- List of institutions of higher education in Kerala
- List of institutions of higher education in Andhra Pradesh
