= Education in Bengaluru =

Education in the city of Bengaluru, India

Bengaluru is home to many educational and research institutions and has played a significant role in the contribution towards skill development. Bengaluru is considered to be one of the educational hubs in India.

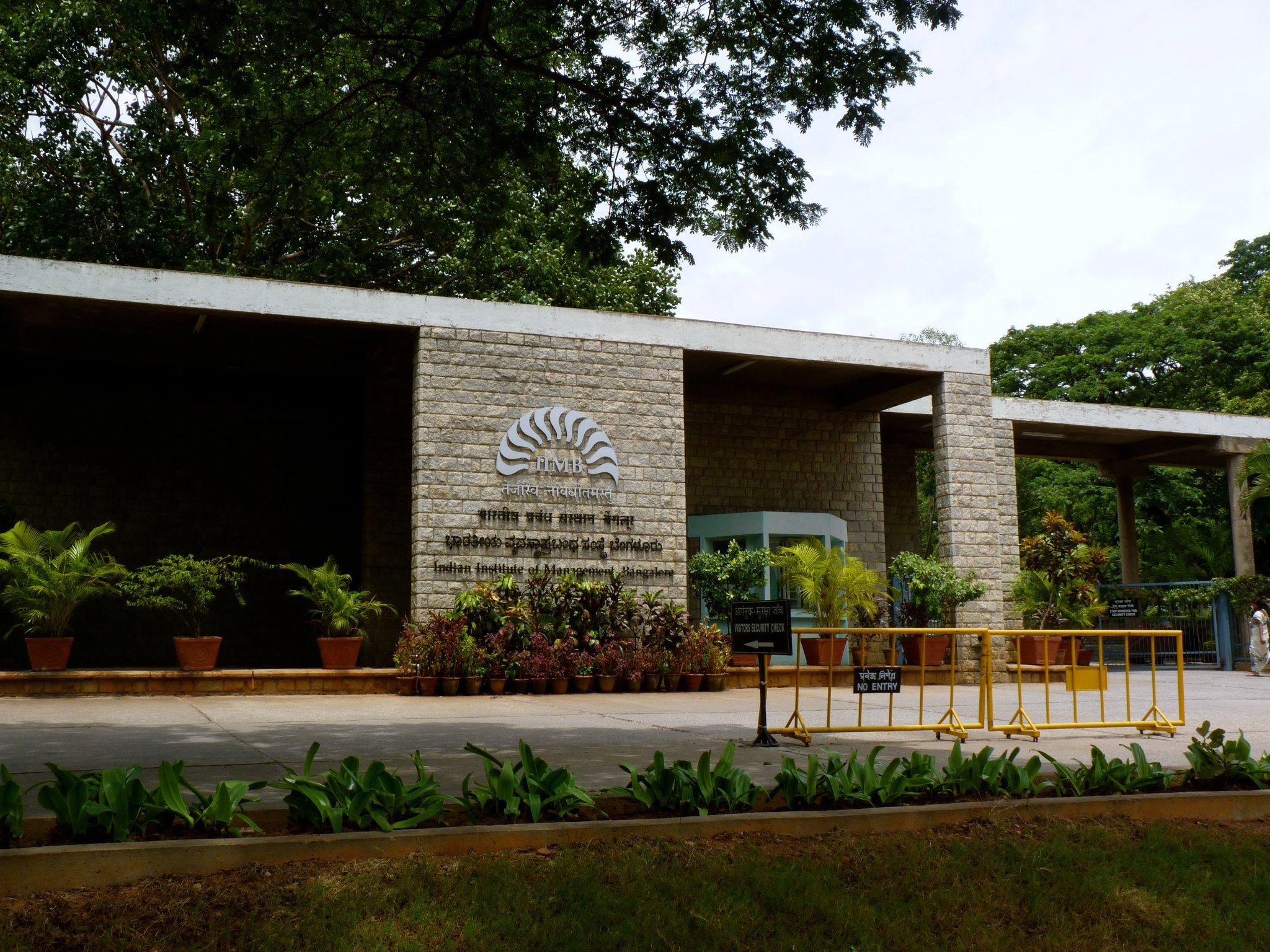
Indian Institute of Management Bangalore, one of the premier management institutes in India

== History ==
Until the early 19th century, education in Bengaluru was mainly run by religious leaders and restricted to students of that religion. The western system of education was introduced during the rule of Mummadi Krishnaraja Wodeyar. Subsequently, the British Wesleyan Mission established the first English school in 1832 known as Wesleyan Canarese School. The Bangalore High School was started by the Mysore Government in 1858, and Bishop Cotton Boys' School was started in 1865. In 1945 when World War II came to an end, King George Royal Indian Military Colleges was started at Bengaluru by King George VI, the school is popularly known as Bangalore Military School

In independent India, schools for young children (16 months to 5 years) are called nursery, kindergarten or Play school which are broadly based on Montessori or Multiple intelligence methodology of education. Primary and secondary education in Bengaluru is offered by various schools and junior colleges which are affiliated to one of the boards of education, such as the Karnataka Secondary Education Examination Board, Indian Certificate of Secondary Education, Central Board for Secondary Education, International Baccalaureate, International General Certificate of Secondary Education and National Institute of Open Schooling and Karnataka PUC Board. Schools in Bengaluru are either government run or are private (both aided and un-aided by the government). Bengaluru has a significant number of International schools due to expats and IT crowd. Students after completing their secondary education (SSLC, SSC) i.e Class 10th, will further pursue higher secondary education i.e Class 11th and Class 12th by either attending a Junior College or by continuing High School in one of three streams – Science, Commerce or Arts. Alternatively, students may also enroll in Diploma courses. Upon completing the required coursework, students enroll in general or professional degrees in universities through regular or lateral entry.

Below are some of the historical schools in Bengaluru and their year of establishment.

- United Mission School (1832)
- St John's High School (1854)
- Sacred Heart Girls' High School (1854)
- St. Joseph's Boys' High School (1858)
- Bishop Cotton Boys' School (1865)
- Bishop Cotton Girls' School (1865)
- Cathedral High School (1866)
- Baldwin Boys' High School (1880)
- Baldwin Girls' High School (1880)
- St. Joseph's Indian High School (1904)
- St Anthony's Boys' School (1913)
- Clarence High School (1914)
- St. Germain High School (1944)
- Bangalore Military School (1946)
- Sophia High School (1949)

== Institutions ==
The Bangalore University, established in 1886, provides affiliation to over 500 colleges, with a total student enrolment exceeding 300,000. The university has two campuses within Bengaluru – Jnanabharathi and Central College.In 2017, the Karnataka government trifurcated Bangalore University (BU) into three separate universities: Bengaluru University (Jnana Bharathi campus), Bengaluru Central( city) University (Central College), and Bengaluru North University (Jangamakote) due to Reduction of Burden on One University University Visvesvaraya College of Engineering was established in the year 1917, by Bharat Ratna Sir M. Visvesvaraya, At present, the UVCE is the only engineering college under the Bangalore University. Bengaluru also has many private Engineering Colleges affiliated to Visvesvaraya Technological University.

Indian Institute of Science, which was established in 1909 in Bengaluru, National Centre for Biological Sciences, National Institute of Mental Health and Neuro Sciences, Jawaharlal Nehru Centre for Advanced Scientific Research and the Raman Research Institute are the premier institutes for scientific research and study in India. Nationally renowned universities and institutes such as the, National Institute of Design, National Institute of Fashion Technology, National Law School of India University, the Indian Institute of Management, International Institute of Information Technology, Christ University, Brindavan College of Engineering, RV Educational Institutions, University of Agricultural Sciences, Bangalore, the ICAR-National Institute of Animal Nutrition and Physiology, the Indian Statistical Institute are located in Bengaluru. Jain University & Mount Carmel University are premiere deemed university. Bengaluru also has some of the best medical colleges in the country, like St. John's Medical College and Bangalore Medical College and Research Institute. The M. P. Birla Institute of Fundamental Research has a branch located in Bangalore.Acharya Bangalore Business School, established in 2008 It isaffiliated to Bangalore University.

The list of best college and University in Bengaluru area

Institute of Eminence

| Institution | Location | Type | Established |
|---|---|---|---|
| Indian Institute of Science (IISc) | Bengaluru | Research | 1909 |

Institute of National Importance

| Institution | Location | Type | Founded |
|---|---|---|---|
| Indian Institute of Management Bangalore | Bengaluru | Management | 1973 |
| National Institute of Mental Health and Neurosciences | Bengaluru | Medicine | 1847 |

List of Colleges & Institute under NIRF Ranking :

| Rank | College Name | Location | NIRF Rank | Affiliated University |
|---|---|---|---|---|
| 1 | St. Joseph's College of Commerce | Bengaluru | 55 | Bengaluru City University |
| 2 | Kristu Jayanti College, Autonomous | Bengaluru | 60 | Bengaluru North University |
| 3 | Mount Carmel College | Bengaluru | 68 | Bengaluru City University |
| 4 | Jyoti Nivas College | Bengaluru | 72 | Bengaluru City University |
| 5 | NMKRV College for Women | Bengaluru | 85 | Bengaluru City University |
| 6 | MES College of Arts, Commerce and Science | Bengaluru | 90 | Bengaluru City University |
| 7 | Maharani Lakshmi Ammanni College for Women | Bengaluru | 95 | Bengaluru City University |
| 8 | Seshadripuram College | Bengaluru | 98 | Bengaluru City University |
| 19 | BMS College for Women | Bengaluru | 100 | Bengaluru City University |

=== University ===
| Rank | University Name | University Type | NIRF Rank | Notable Affiliated Colleges |
|---|---|---|---|---|
| 1 | Indian Institute of Science (IISc), Bengaluru | Institute of National Importance | 1 | N/A (IISc is a standalone institution) |
| 2 | Christ University, Bengluru, | Deemed University | 60 | Christ College, Bengaluru |
| 3 | Alliance University, Bengaluru | Private University | 98 | Alliance School of Business, Alliance College of Engineering and Design |
| 4 | Jain University, Bengaluru | Deemed University | 100 | Center for Management Studies, School of Engineering and Technology |

== List of International Schools in Bengaluru ==
The Japanese Weekend School of Bangalore (バンガロール日本人補習授業校 Bangarōru Nihonjin Hoshū Jugyō Kō), a Japanese weekend educational programme, serves Japanese nationals living in Bangalore. It holds its classes in the Canadian International School in Yelahanka, Bangalore. Cultural classes are held at White Petals School, Yelahanka. The list of Schools in Bengaluru area are in List of schools in Bengaluru.
