= Sri Venkateswara College (disambiguation) =

Sri Venkateswara College may refer to:

- Sri Venkateswara College, Delhi, a constituent college of the University of Delhi.
- Sri Venkateswara College of Engineering, Tirupati, an engineering college in Tirupati, Andhra Pradesh
- Sri Venkateswara College of Engineering, Pennalur, Sriperumbudur near Chennai
- Shree Venkateshwara Hi-Tech Engineering College, Gobichettipalayam, Tamil Nadu
- Sri Venkateshwara College of Engineering, Bangalore

== See also ==
- Venkateshwara Institute of Technology, Meerut
