= Acharya Institute of Graduate Studies =

Private engineering college in Bengaluru, India

Coordinates: 13.084222°N 77.484917°E

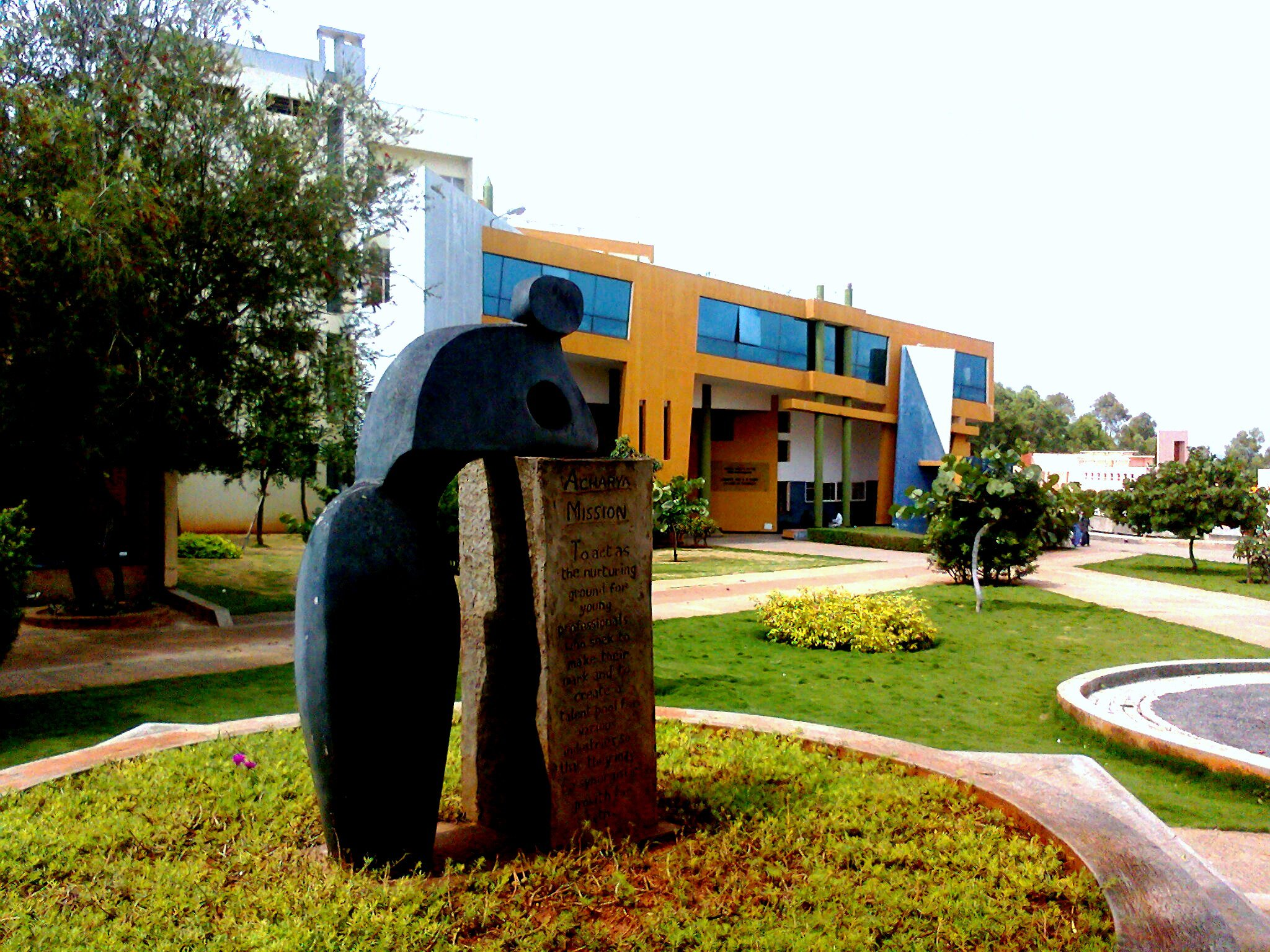
- The Acharya emblem with motto and mission
- Type: Private college
- Established: 2005; 21 years ago
- Affiliations: Bengaluru City University
- Location: Bengaluru, Karnataka, India
- Campus: Urban

Acharya Institute of Graduate Studies, or AIGS, is a private co-educational engineering and management college in Bengaluru, India, affiliated with the Bengaluru City University (BCU) and accredited by the National Assessment and Accreditation Council (NAAC).

== History ==
Established in 2005, it offers seven undergraduate courses and nine postgraduate courses.

Acharya organizes the Acharya Habba, an annual two-day intercollegiate cultural festival that is one of the largest in Bengaluru and Karnataka.

The Deccan Herald lists AIGS as one of the "notable" colleges to apply the Karnataka Management Aptitude Test (KMAT) for admission to postgraduate management courses.

In 2012, the institute was granted "Technical Campus" status by the All India Council for Technical Education (AICTE).
