= Acharya Institutes =

Engineering and management college in Bangalore, India

Acharya
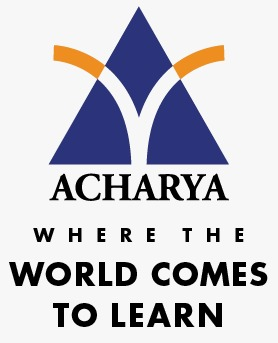
- Motto: Nurturing Aspirations, Supporting Growth
- Type: Engineering and Management college
- Established: 1990
- Academic affiliations: Visvesvaraya Technological University (VTU, Bengaluru City University (BCU),Rajiv Gandhi University of Health Sciences (RGUHS)
- Chairman: B. Premnath Reddy
- Location: Bengaluru, Karnataka, India; 13°5′0.19″N 77°29′2.47″E
- Campus: Urban, 120 acres (49 ha), Soladevanahalli, Acharya Dr. Sarvapalli Radhakrishnan Road, Hesaraghatta Main Road, Bengaluru – 560090.
- Accreditation: AICTE, NBA, NACC
- Colours: Blue, white and orange
- Website: www.acharya.ac.in

Acharya Institutes is a group of educational institutions located in Bangalore, India. The institutes were established in 1990 by B.Premnath Reddy, Chairman of the Acharya Group of Institutions. The college is managed by the JMJ Education Society which is headquartered in Bengaluru.

== The Acharya Institute of Technology ==
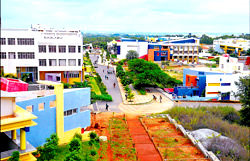
Acharya Institute of Technology Campus

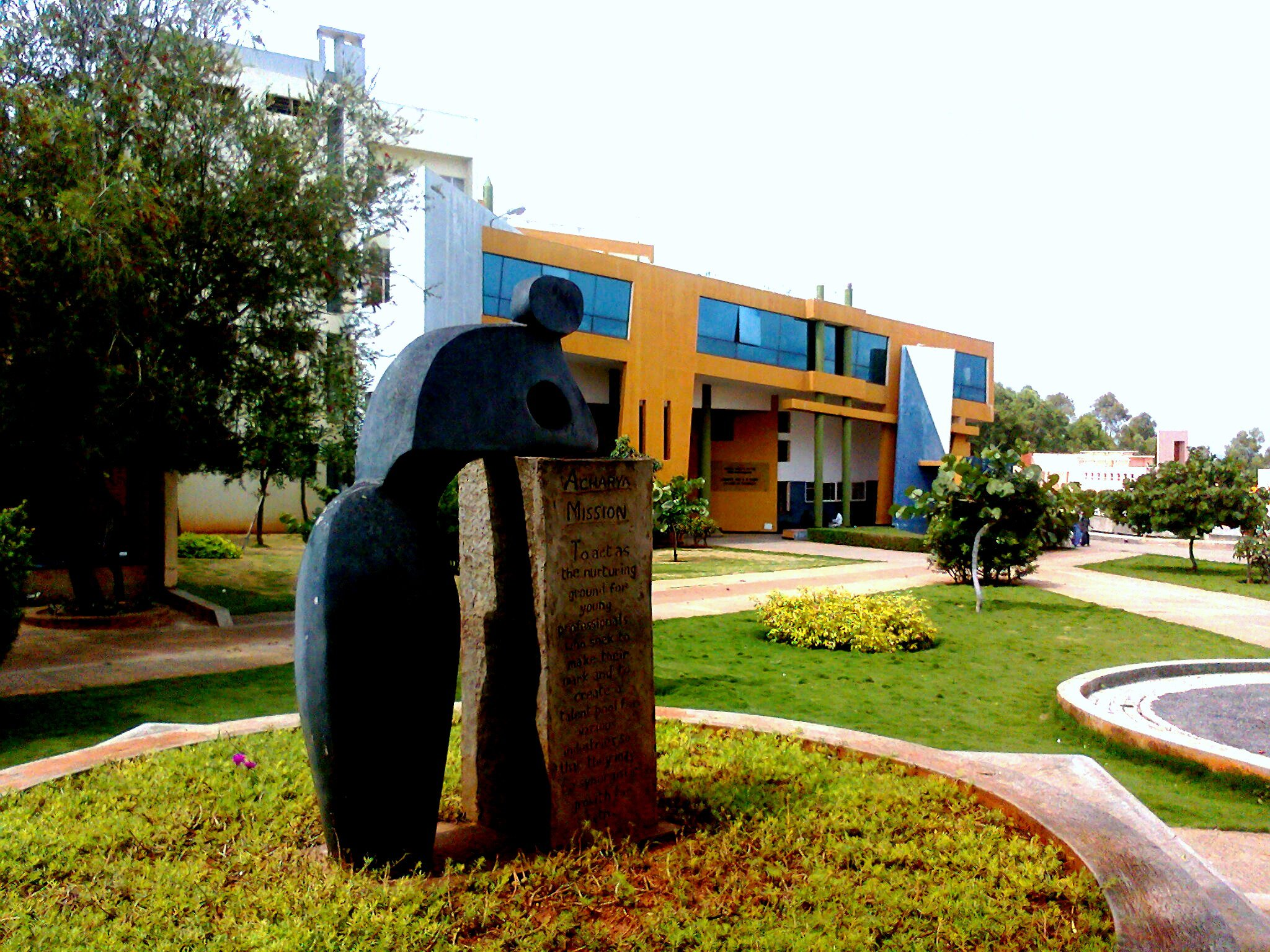
The Acharya emblem with motto and mission

The Acharya Institute of Technology(AIT), established in 2000, is an engineering college in Bengaluru, India, affiliated with the Visvesvaraya Technological University (VTU). AIT is accredited by the National Assessment and Accreditation Council (NAAC) and the National Board of Accreditation (NBA). The institute is also ranked by the National Institutional Ranking Framework (NIRF).

== The Acharya Institute of Graduate Studies ==
The Acharya Institute of Graduate Studies(AIGS), established in 2005, offers undergraduate and postgraduate programs in various disciplines. It is affiliated with the Bengaluru City University (BCU).

== Acharya & BM Reddy College of Pharmacy ==
Acharya & BM Reddy College of Pharmacy(ABMRCP) is affiliated with the Rajiv Gandhi University of Health Sciences (RGUHS). The college is accredited by NAAC and NBA.

== Acharya's NRV School of Architecture ==
Acharya's NRV School of Architecture, offers a five-year Bachelor of Architecture program. It is affiliated with the Visvesvaraya Technological University (VTU).

== Acharya School of Design ==
Acharya School of Design, affiliated with the Bengaluru City University, offers a Bachelor of Visual Arts program. The school follows an NEP-compliant design curriculum.

== Acharya Institute of Allied Health Sciences ==
Established in 2019, Acharya Institute of Health Sciences offers bachelor's programs in health-related fields. It is affiliated with the Rajiv Gandhi University of Health Sciences (RGUHS).

== Acharya's NR Institute of Physiotherapy ==
Acharya's NR Institute of Physiotherapy (ANRIP) offers a Bachelor of Physiotherapy program and is affiliated with the Rajiv Gandhi University of Health Sciences (RGUHS).

== Smt. Nagarathnamma School of Nursing ==
Smt. Nagarathnamma School of Nursing offers a Diploma in General Nursing and Midwifery. It is recognized by the Government of Karnataka, approved by the Indian Nursing Council (INC) and the Karnataka State Nursing Council (KSNC), and affiliated with the Karnataka State Diploma In Nursing Examination Board (KSDNEB).

== Smt. Nagarathnamma College of Nursing ==
Established in 2003, Smt. Nagarathnamma College of Nursing offers comprehensive nursing programs. It is affiliated with the Rajiv Gandhi University of Health Sciences (RGUHS).

== Acharya Polytechnic ==
Acharya Polytechnic, established in 1990, offers three-year diploma programs in engineering, non-engineering, and technology fields. It is affiliated with the Visvesvaraya Technological University (VTU).

== Academic profile ==
=== Accreditation ===
AIT is accredited by the National Board of Accreditation (NBA). It was the first college of the Visvesvaraya Technological University to start an undergraduate course in Mechatronics in Karnataka. It is one of the seven colleges in Karnataka to be funded by the World Bank and receives endowments from the VTU to carry out research in both its undergraduate and postgraduate departments.

In May 2024, Acharya BM Reddy College achieved an A+ grade in NAAC accreditation.

== Educational Fairs and Admissions ==
In 2024, Acharya Institutes organized the Acharya Foreign Universities Education Fair.

Acharya celebrated "Nudi Taranga '24": A Vibrant Tribute to Karnataka's Culture and Unity in connect with Karnataka Rajyothsava.

Acharya School of Design students visited Dubai, studying architecture, interiors, construction methods, sustainability, and global design practices.

== Campus ==
=== Educational facilities ===
The college has a Central Library with EDUSAT programmes, E-learning facilities and an Online Public Access Catalog (OPAC) gateway. It has various collaborations with multinational corporations and has established learning facilities like the Vasundhara Industrial Automation Learning Center, the IBM Software Center of Excellence, the Microsoft IT Academy and the Novell Centre of Excellence. The International Academy for Competency Enhancement provides students and recent graduates with English language skills and technical training to equip them for work in industry.

=== Entrepreneur Incubation Cell ===
The college has signed a Memorandum of Understanding with IBM and has established the IBM Entrepreneur Incubation Center on the campus.

== Cultural activities ==
=== Acharya Habba 2025 ===
The college organises the Acharya Habba, an annual inter-collegiate culfest that attracts a crowd of over 30,000 students from over 300 colleges across Karnataka.

=== Sports ===
In 2023, Acharya Institute of Technology won the Karnataka State-level VTU Baseball Tournament.
