= Government Science College, Bengaluru =

Nrupathunga University
- Type: Public
- Established: 1921
- Location: Bengaluru, Karnataka, India
- Campus: Urban
- Affiliations: Bengaluru City University
- Website: Official website

Nrupathunga University (NU), formerly known as Government Science College (GSC), is a public state university for pursuing Bachelor's and Master's degrees in science of various physical science and life science courses.

In 2020, the Government Science College, which was split in 1971 alongside the Government Arts College, was upgraded to a unitary university, and named Nrupathunga University, after the approval of Governor Vajubhai Vala through the Karnataka State Universities and Certain Other Law (Second Amendment) Act, 2020.

It was given the university status after the state government recognised its contribution to society for 99 years, institutional values, academic excellence, research publications, NAAC (National Assessment and Accreditation Council) accreditation and students' performance among other criteria.

== Accreditation ==
The college is recognized by the University Grants Commission (UGC) and has been awarded College with Potential for Excellence - CPE status for the second time. During the third cycle of NAAC accreditation, the college has been awarded A++ with a CGPA of 3.54.

The college is recognised by DST - FIST (Department of Science & Technology - Fund for Improvement of S&T Institutions).
