= Presidency College, Bengaluru =

College in India

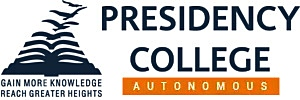
- Motto: Gain More Knowledge, Reach Greater Heights
- Type: Private College
- Established: 2000; 26 years ago
- Accreditation: NAAC with A+, UGC
- Affiliations: Bengaluru City University
- Chancellor: Dr. Nissar Ahmed
- Vice-Chancellor: Suhael Ahmed
- Principal: Dr. Pradeep Kumar Shinde
- Academic staff: 1200+
- Students: 14000+
- Location: Bengaluru, India; 13°3′1.98″N 77°35′52.88″E
- Campus: Urban
- Language: English
- Website: Official website

Presidency College is an autonomous private professional college in India. It was founded by The Presidency Group of Institutions. The Presidency Group was established in 1976, and today consists of seven schools, two colleges and one university based in Mangaluru and Bengaluru. It is an NIRF Ranked College in 2017, was re-accredited by NAAC with "A+", and affiliated to both Karnataka Board of Pre-University and Bengaluru City University and approved by AICTE, New Delhi.

== Courses offered ==
=== Undergraduate courses ===
- Bachelor of Commerce (B.Com)
- Bachelor of Business Administration (BBA)
- Bachelor of Computer Applications (BCA)
- Bachelor of Arts in Humanities (BA)

=== Postgraduate courses ===
- Master of Commerce in Finance and Accounting (M.Com)
- Master of Business Administration (MBA)
- Master of Computer Applications (MCA)

=== PhD ===
- PhD - Management
