= College of Fine Arts, Bengaluru =

College in Bangalore, Karnataka, India

- Other names: Karnataka Chitrakala Parishath; CKP
- Former name: Chitrakala Vidyalaya
- Type: Public
- Established: 1964; 62 years ago
- Founders: S. S. Kukke, M. Arya Murthy, M.S. Nanjunda Rao
- Affiliations: Bengaluru City University
- Students: 150+
- Location: Bangalore, Karnataka, India; 12.903335°N 77.507299°E
- Campus: Urban
- Website: http://thecfa.art/

College of Fine Arts, Bengaluru (CFA), earlier known as Chitrakala Vidyalaya, is a fine arts college located at Bangalore, Karnataka, affiliated to Bengaluru City University. It was established in the year 1964. This college offers different undergraduate and postgraduate courses in fine arts.

== History ==
The College of Fine Arts, Bengaluru was first established in 1964 as Chitrakala Vidyalaya under the guidance of the Karnataka Chitrakala Parishath. The institution was founded by Sri M Aryamurthy. Prof. M.S. Nanjunda Rao served as the founder secretary and first Principal. Sri S. S Kukke briefly assumed the role of Principal during its early years. Chitrakala Vidyalaya was inaugurated in 1964 by Russian artist Svetoslav Roerich. The institution offered only a certification course, which later developed into a five-year diploma in the 1970s. In 1983, the College of Fine Arts was granted degree college status with affiliation to Bangalore University , offering Bachelor of Fine Arts and Master of Fine Arts.

== Campus ==
The college was initially located within the Karnataka Chitrakala Parishath premises in Bengaluru. Due to the increasing student enrolment and space constraints, the campus was relocated to a hilly 14-acre campus on the Uttarahalli-Kengeri main road near Rajarajeshwari Nagar on the southwestern edge of Bangalore City.

In 2017, the Karnataka Chitrakala Parishath announced plans to establish an evening fine arts college to cater to working professionals and students unable to attend daytime programmes. This institution later became the Bengaluru School of Visual Arts (Evening College)

== Courses ==
- Painting
- Sculpture
- Graphic Art
- Applied Art
- Art History
- Animation
- Ceramics

== Accreditation ==
The college is recognized by the University Grants Commission (UGC) and has been NAAC accredited since 2004.

== Activities ==
In 2013, the college was among five educational art institutions, including Bangalore University, Kalamandir School of Art, Ken School of Art, and Srishti School of Art, Design and Technology, collaborated with the Bangalore Metro Rail Corporation Limited (BMRCL) for the "Namma Nagara Project", which aimed to adorn numerous spaces along the MG Road Metro boulevard with students' creative works.

Students of the college participate in exhibitions, workshops, and cultural events organized by the Karnataka Chitrakala Parishath, including the annual day-long art festival Chitra Santhe

In 2026, students of the college, under the guidance of the chief architect of the Public Works Department, designed logo drafts for the Greater Bengaluru Authority. Fifty-eight concepts were shortlisted from nearly a thousand entries. The logos designed by the students were finalised at an executive committee meeting on 20 March 2026, chaired by Deputy Chief Minister of Karnataka, D. K. Shivakumar.

== Notable alumni ==
- Daisy Bopanna, actress
- Disha Madan, actress
- Kenny Sebastian, stand-up comedian
- Mansore, filmmaker, screenwriter, and lyricist
- Roma Asrani, actress
- Sangeetha Kadur, artist
- Shashank, director

== See also ==
- List of art schools
- List of institutions of higher education in Bangalore
