= Yelahanka =

- Bangalore Urban
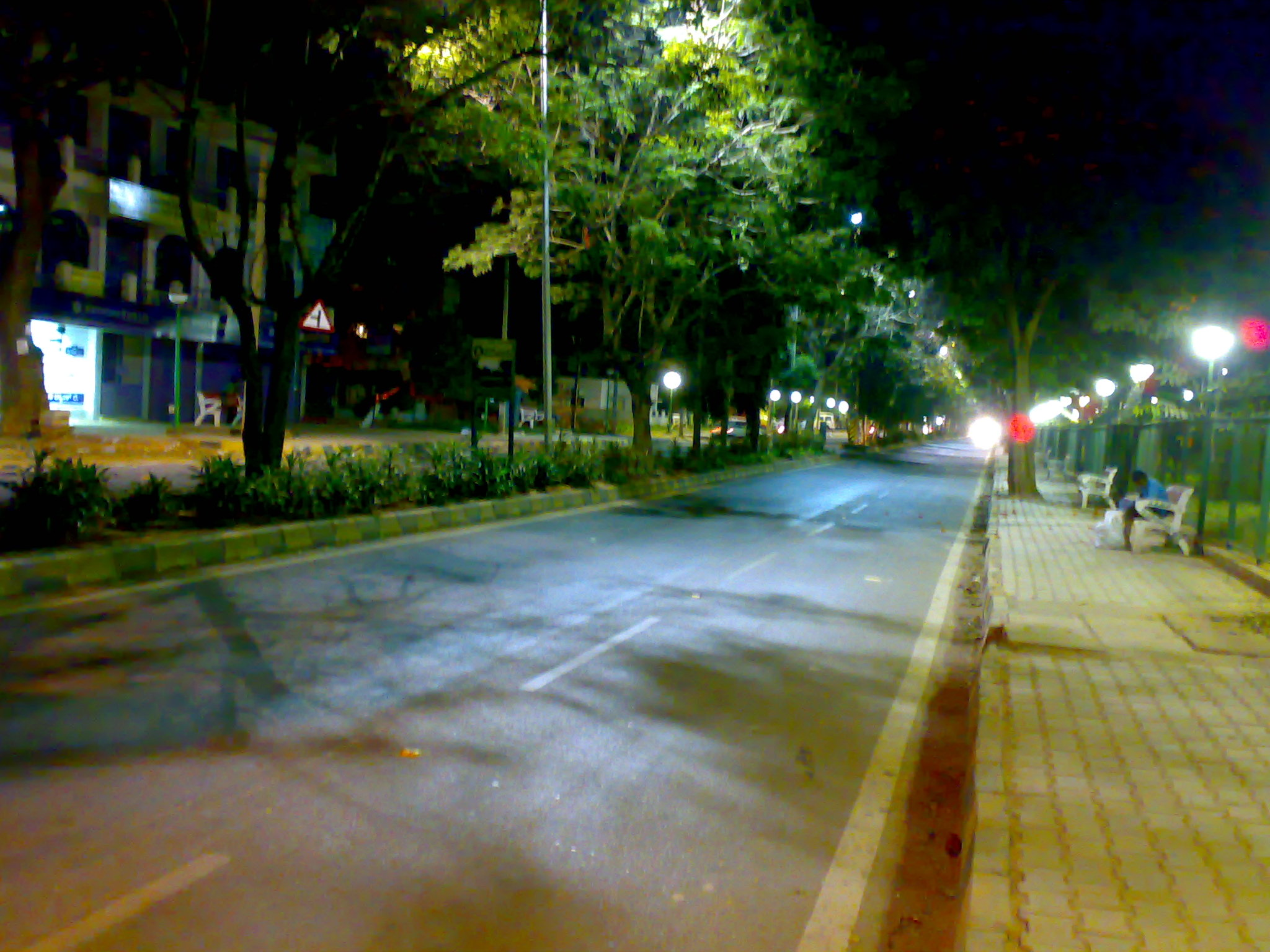
- Major Sandeep Unnikrishnan Road, Yelahanka New Town

- Location in Karnataka
- Coordinates: 13°06′50″N 77°35′54″E
- Country: India
- State: Karnataka
- District: Bengaluru Urban
- Metro: Bengaluru

Government
  - Body: GBA
- Elevation: 915 m (3,002 ft)

Population ( 2011)
  - Total: 300,000

Languages
  - Official: Kannada
- Time zone: UTC+5:30 (IST)
- PIN: 560063,560064,560065,560092,560106
- Telephone code: 91-80
- Vehicle registration: KA-50

Yelahanka is an area in North Bangalore and also a Taluk of Bangalore Urban district in the Indian state of Karnataka, coming under the Bangalore North City Corporation. It is the oldest part of present Municipal Bengaluru (Bangalore) city and the northern end of the city. It is Nadaprabhu Kempegowda I, of the Yelahanka Prabhu clans, who laid the foundation of present-day Bengaluru through the creation of a "mud fort town" in 1537 CE.

Yelahanka Air Force Station This is an important Indian Air Force base in Yelahanka.

== History ==
Yelahanka had been in existence prior to the 12th century. The region was called 'Ilaipakka Naadu' in Tamil during the rule of Cholas. A stone tablet of 1267 A.D found in Doddaballapur mentions Dechi Devarasa, ruling the region with Yelahanka as his capital under the aegis of Hoysala monarch Narasimha III.

The founder of Bangalore Kempegowda I, was born in Yelahanka. He was the Chieftain and feudatory of the area during the reign of King Krishna Deva Raya of Vijayanagara. Yelahanka has a history of more than 500 years. Chieftain Kempegowda who built Bangalore fort and the Yelahanka Town in 1537 AD, transferred his capital from Yelahanka to Bangalore after Bangalore city was built.

Later, during Hoysala reign, the city came to be known as 'Elavanka' and gradually shifted to 'Yelahanka'. It was also known as Elavank.

Of the numerous rulers of different dynasties who ruled with Yelahanka as their capital, the Kempe Gowdas are the most acclaimed. Hiriya Kempe Gowda (Kempe Gowda the First) built a fort in the adjoining village of Bengaluru and developed it as his new capital, probably due to its strategic location and slightly cooler climate being at a higher altitude. It was his son, Immadi Kempe Gowda, who had the famous watchtowers built in the four directions of the new city.

Some temples in Yelahanka—like the Venugopala Swamy Temple—have remained as a testimony to its rich past. Although a Fort's remnant could not be traced, a street nearby the Venugopala Swamy Temple is still known as 'Kote Beedi' or 'Fort Street'.

== Modern Yelahanka ==
Yelahanka lies to the north of Bengaluru. It was a municipal council and taluk (lies below the district level in administrative setup) headquarters prior to the formation of BBMP (a metro corporation annexing the original Bangalore area and its suburbs) and now forms a part of Greater Bengaluru, under the North City Corporation. Developed as well-planned township during the early 1980s to the north of the city by the Karnataka Housing Board, it is known by several names like 'Yelahanka Upanagara', 'Yelahanka Satellite Town', 'Yelahanka New Town' or simply 'Housing Board'.

National Highway 44 (NH 44) passes through Yelahanka. The newly constructed Navayuga Devanahalli KIAL Expressway (also a part of NH 44) also passes through the area and the northeastern fringes of Yelahanka, acting as a bypass road. State Highway 9 (Bangalore - Hindupur, also known as Doddaballapur Road) passing in the south of Yelahanka bisects the area into Old Town and New Town. Yelahanka's business areas are Hospital Main Road and BB road in Yelahanka and New Town are 16th 'B' Cross, Mother Dairy Cross and Yelahanka New Town, fourth phase.

Yelahanka has several lakes surrounding it, adjoining: Old Yelahanka, Puttenahalli, Attur, Ananthapura, and Allalasandra. The lake at Puttenahalli (3 km (1.9 mi) up the SH 9) has been declared a bird sanctuary.

Yelahanka is emerging as a premium residential locality in North Bangalore, known for its infrastructure, educational institutions, proximity to employment hubs, and abundance of green spaces.

Most major retail brands have a presence in Yelahanka. Major ones include Yelahanka Central, Galleria Mall, and DMart in Yelahanka New Town.

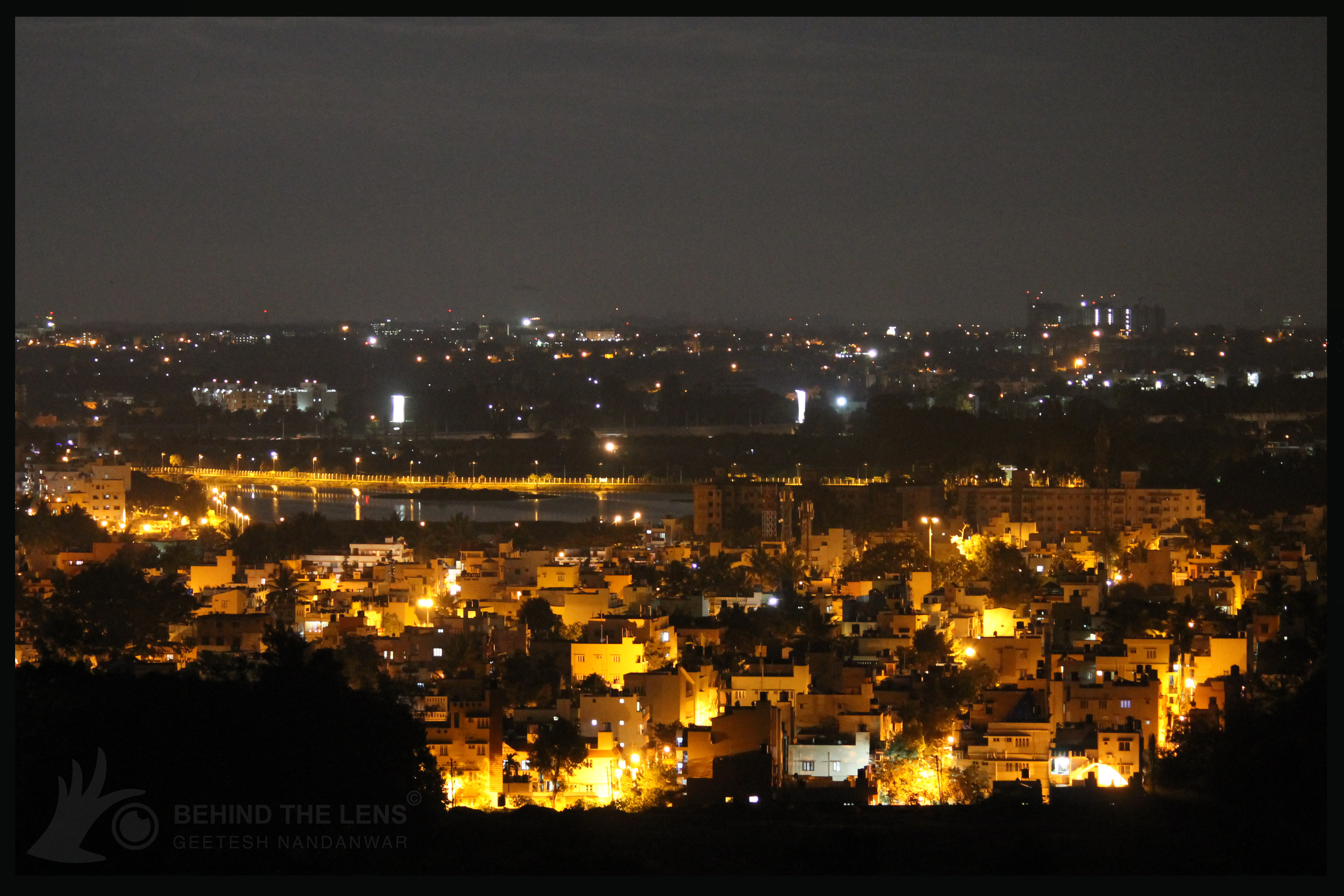
Yelahanka Satellite Town, Yelahanka, Bangalore.

== Geography ==
Yelahanka is at an elevation of about 915 metres (3,000 ft) above mean sea level. Due to its higher altitude from mean sea level, it is lush green and has pleasant weather year-round.

- The summer season lasts from March to mid-May, with temperatures ranging between 23 and 38 °C (73 and 100 °F)
- At the end of May, the monsoon season starts and lasts until the end of October. There are about 45 inches (1,100 mm) of rain annually. Yelahanka is served by both southwest as well as northeast monsoon.
- Winters are mild and lasts from November to February, with temperatures ranging between 13 and 28 °C (55 and 82 °F).

== Demographics ==
As of 2001 India census, Yelahanka had a population of 93,263. Males constituted 54% of the population and females 46%. The literacy rate was 75%, higher than the national average of 59.5%: male literacy was 80%, and female literacy was 68%. Eleven percent of the population were under 6 years of age.

As per recent estimates, the population of Yelahanka has risen to about 300,000 in 2012.

== Connectivity ==
Yelahanka has connectivity via road, rail, and air. Yelahanka railway station has railway lines connecting KR Puram and Byappanahalli in the east and Yeshwanthpur in the northwest.

=== Metro ===
Yelahanka metro station is an upcoming important elevated metro station on the north–south corridor of the Blue Line of Namma Metro in Bangalore, India

=== Roadways ===
Yelahanka is connected with downtown Bangalore through a network of roads and a six-lane dual carriageway highway. The same highway connects Yelahanka with Kempegowda International Airport. BMTC (Bangalore Metropolitan Transport Corporation), KSRTC serves Yelahanka with its network of buses. There are regular BMTC Volvo A/C Bus services and other buses to Bangalore from Yelahanka.

National Highway 44 (North–South Corridor) also passes through Yelahanka.

Karnataka State Highway 9 starts at Yelahanka main road near Yelahanka traffic police station and ends near the Andhra Pradesh border near Vidurashwatha, where it continues as AP SH 472 until Hindupuram.

Yelahanka is also served by a host of private taxi companies operating in the Greater Bangalore area and also the auto rickshaw services within the Bangalore Metropolitan Area.

=== Rail ===
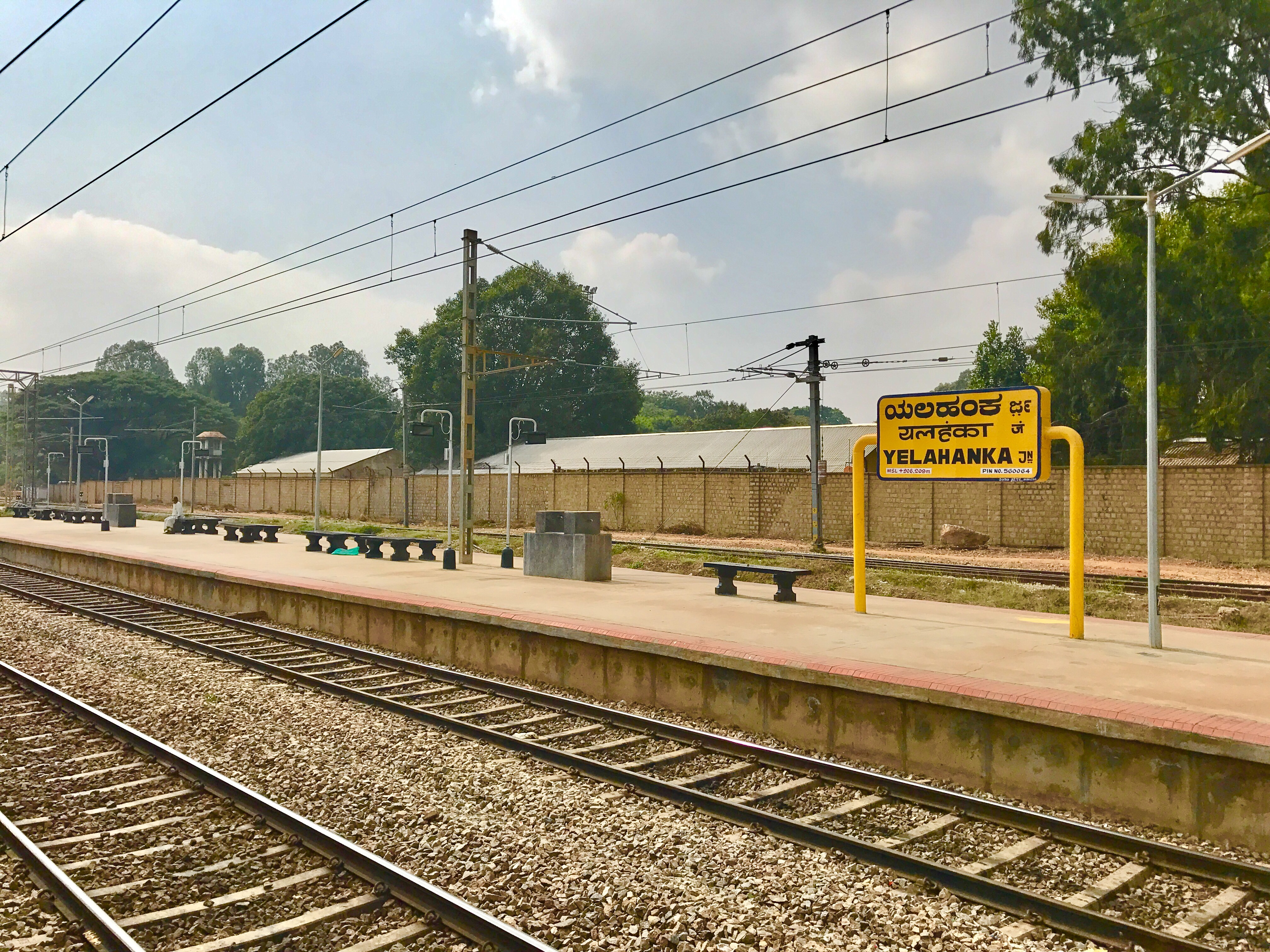
Yelahanka Station board

Yelahanka Jn. (code YNK) is a junction railway station of South Western Railway Zone, served by Indian Railways. Yelahanka Jn. comes under the jurisdiction of Bangalore Division and is about 15 km (9.3 mi) north of Bangalore City Railway station (SBC).

The station lies on the train line connecting Bangalore with North, West, and Central India via Guntakal Junction. There are four routes merging at the station - (south) one from Yeshwantpur (YPR) and the other from Byapanahalli – Krishnarajapuram (KJM). (north) one from Chikkballapur and the other from Doddballapur connecting all major cities in the country.

The station is served by regularly scheduled train services originating, terminating, and passing through Bangalore Metropolitan region. The majority of express and passenger trains halt at Yelahanka Jn. station, connecting it to all major cities and towns in the country. There are passenger train services that connect Yelahanka Jn. to nearby towns and other parts of Bangalore.

Yelahanka Jn. has a computerized Indian Railway ticket booking office.

Rail Wheel Factory (earlier known as Wheel and Axle Plant) is situated in Yelahanka. It is a state-of-the-art plant, meeting the bulk of the requirement of wheels, axles, and wheel sets for the Indian Railways. The spare capacity available is profitably utilized to meet the domestic demands for non-railway customers and exports.

== Administration ==
- The Yelahanka Vidhan Sabha constituency has been repreresented by S. R. Vishwanath since 2008.
- The authority responsible for the upkeep of Yelahanka is BNCC (Bangalore North City Corporation), under the GBA (Greater Bengaluru Authority).
- There are two police stations within Yelahanka, one in Yelahanka and the other in Yelahanka New town and one Traffic police Station in Yelahanka.
- Yelahanka has its own RTO KA-50, located in Singanayakanahalli.
- Yelahanka has its own Sub-Registrar office at NES Office inside Mini Soudha Building.
- Yelahanka has two BMTC depots – depots 11 & 30 located at Puttenahalli.
- Yelahanka is the headquarters of Yelahanka Zone, Yelahanka division, Yelahanka sub-division and Yelahanka Ward

== Industries ==
- Yelahanka is a traditional place of weavers. The silk handloom has been the lifeline of Yelahanka people for over 2 centuries, and even now in areas like Kamakshamma layout, Agrahara layout, Kogilu, Maruti Nagar, and Chowdeshwari layout silk saree development can be seen. And saree products are being marketed over here.
- Yelahanka has one amongst the largest milk dairies of Karnataka State, known as 'Mother Dairy', a processing unit of the state run by the Karnataka Milk Federation (KMF).
- Yelahanka houses the Rail Wheel Factory (formerly Wheel and Axle Plant), a Production Unit of Indian Railways. It is the largest manufacturer of Railway Wheels and Axles producing 2.2 lakh cast wheels from three electric arc furnaces and 1.3 lakh forged axles annually.
- Other industry includes Astra Zeneca Pharmaceuticals, Esanosys Technologies, Federal-Mogul Goetze (India) Limited (formerly Escorts Mahle Goetze), Ranflex India Pvt. Ltd. Hobel Flexibles Inc & Sri Pradhyumna Technologies Pvt. Ltd. Leonsoft solutions, R L FINE CHEM, CENTUM ELECTRONICE, PROVIMI, VENKTESWARA CLOTHING UNIT II.

== Agriculture/farming ==
Crops like paddy, rice, and Raagi (millet) were cultivated at a small scale in the area with irrigation from numerous lakes in the area, prior to Yelahanka's urbanization. The villages surrounding Yelahanka, especially Allalasandra, were famous for Guava fruit and grapes. Agriculture and farming are no longer practised here due to urbanization and industrialization.

Governmental research facilities exist around Yelahanka in the form of Gandhi Krishi Vigyana Kendra (GKVK) under the University of Agricultural Sciences and Central Institute of Medicinal and Aromatic Plants (CIMAP) under the Council of Scientific and Industrial Research (CSIR).

== See more ==
Katigenahalli (Bengaluru) Inscription and herostone

== Education ==
There are many schools and colleges in Yelahanka. The first International school established was Aditi International School in the year 1993. It is a highly prestigious day school that offers ICSE, ISC, IGCSE Cambridge AS and A-level programs. Other educational institutions in Yelahanka include KNN College of Nursing, Nagarjuna Vidyaniketan, Seshadripuram Public School, Ryan International School, National Public School, Delhi Public School, Canadian International School, Bhavan's, Chrysalis High, Presidency School, Poorna Pragna Education Centre, Kendriya Vidyalaya RWF

There are many technical education institutions in and around Yelahanka. Some of the prominent engineering colleges in the vicinity are REVA University, Sir M. Visvesvaraya Institute of Technology, BMS Institute of Technology, Brindavan College of Engineering, Nitte Meenakshi Institute of Technology, Sai Vidya Institute of Technology, Reva Institute of Technology and Management, HKBK College of Engineering, East West College of Engineering and Sri Venkateshwara College of Engineering, Bangalore. Also present is Manipal Institute of technology (Bengaluru) which is a highly prestigious college for engineering studies .

Vibgyor High School, has its 20th branch in Yelahanka.

Srishti Institute of Art Design and Technology, has six campuses across Yelahanka New Town.

White Petals School (WPS) is located in fourth Phase Yelahanka. It has been awarded as "Best Upcoming School" by Education Today.

== Defence establishments ==
- The Indian Air Force has a presence in Yelahanka with an Air Force Station and a defence airport situated on NH7. An international air show is held every two years which attracts manufacturers and sellers of defence equipment, defence aircraft, and "next gen" fighters.
- The BSF (Border Security Force) has a training center in Yelahanka. The Special Operations training center is located on NH7, towards the northern part of the suburb, on the road leading to BIAL.
- CRPF (Central Reserve Police Force) has a training school for their officers and troops at Yelahanka, with residential campuses for the troops. CRPF campus is located in a lush green environment on Doddaballapur Road.
- Karnataka State Reserve Police has its training facility at Yelahanka. The academy is located in the northern part of the suburb, near the Air Force station.

Temples -
