= Institute of Public Health Bengaluru =

Indian academic research institution

Institute of Public Health, Bengaluru
- Abbreviation: IPH Bengaluru or IPH Bangalore
- Formation: 30 August 2005
- Type: Non-profit academic institution
- Headquarters: Bengaluru, Karnataka, India
- Location: 3009, II-A Main, 17th Cross, KR Road, Siddanna Layout, Banashankari Stage II, Bengaluru, Karnataka 560070
- Region served: India
- Website: iphindia.org

The Institute of Public Health, Bengaluru (IPH Bengaluru) is a non-profit academic research institution based in Bengaluru, Karnataka, India. It focuses on strengthening health systems through research, education, and policy engagement in India. They are recognised as a scientific research organisation by the department of science and technology of the Indian government. Their areas of work and action include commercial determinants of health, tribal health, health policy and systems research.

== History ==
IPH Bengaluru was founded by Narayanan Devadasan and colleagues on 30 August 2005 and registered as a non-profit society. Since 2018, IPH Bengaluru has institutionalised a rotating system of leadership with four-year tenure for the Directors.

== Research and action ==
Research areas include commercial determinants of health including tobacco control, Adivasi health and health policy and systems research. The Institute conducts research on implementation of tobacco control laws and studying tobacco industry interference in Karnataka and other states, using judicial action . Their research has examined the tobacco industry's potential tax avoidance and tactics in avoiding compliance with laws requiring pictorial warnings. IPH runs a community-based research centre on tribal health in Chamarajanagar district. The initiative focuses on addressing health inequities among Adivasi communities, on genetic diseases, hemoglobinopathies, and barriers to accessing healthcare. They have contributed to the development of the Tribal Health Navigator program in Chamarajanagar.

== Policy engagement ==
IPH Bengaluru co-organizes a national conference series on bringing evidence into public health policy. The fourth edition of the Evidence into Public Health Policy (EPHP) conference in September 2024, held at the Indian Institute of Management Bangalore, focused on health governance, policy, and institutional frameworks for just and sustainable health systems and brought together over 200 participants, including researchers, policymakers, and practitioners. In June 2026, the fifth edition of the conference discussed future-focused health systems.

== Awards and recognition ==
In 2022, researchers from the Institute were recognised by Deccan Herald as part of their annual Changemakers initiative, for their contributions to supporting COVID-19 response in Chamarajanagar district, especially among Adivasi populations. They were also awarded the Triloki Nath Khoshoo Memorial Award by Ashoka Trust for Research in Ecology and the Environment for contributions to the COVID-19 response in Karnataka.

== See also ==
- Public Health Foundation of India
- National Centre for Disease Control (India)
- National Tuberculosis Institute
