= Canadian International School (Bengaluru) =

Private school in Bangalore, India

Coordinates: 13.1204°N 77.5937°E

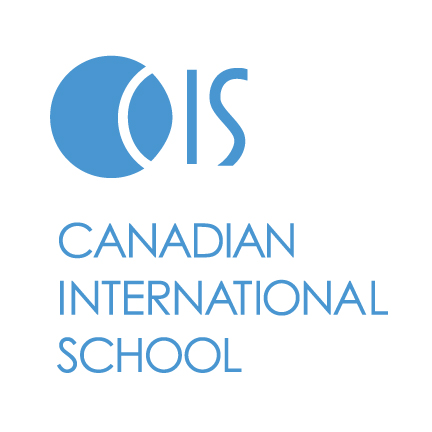

Location
- No. 4&20 Manchenahalli; Yelahanka; Bangalore, 560064; India

Information
- Type: Private, College-prep, Day & Boarding; International school
- Motto: Nurture, Challenge, and Empower
- Established: 1996
- Principals: Chris Mockrish (ES); Andrew Nicholson (MS); Kevin Thomas (HS)
- Head of school: Ted Mockrish Ed. D
- Grades: PK–12
- Accreditation: IBO, New England Association of Schools and Colleges, Cambridge International School, Cambridge, ECIS, The Common Ground Collaborative, East Asia Regional Council of Overseas Schools, Apple Distinguished School, FOBISIA, ISTA, AMIS, College Board,
- Website: www.canadianinternationalschool.com

Canadian International School (Bangalore) (CIS) is a private co-educational school located in Yelahanka, Bangalore North, India. Yelahanka is close to Bangalore International Airport. CIS is certified by the Council of International Schools and New England Association of Schools and Colleges. It was the first school in Bangalore authorized by the IBO to offer International Baccalaureate Program for grades 11 and 12.

== History ==
Canadian International School (CIS) was established in 1996 by two Canadian entrepreneurs under the name "Canadian School of India". It was started for students desiring an international education in an international environment. The school was taken over by a new board of directors in 2002 and was then renamed as the "Canadian International School". Canadian International School shifted its campus to a 15-acre purpose-built campus in 2006. It was the first school in Bangalore authorized to offer the International Baccalaureate Diploma Program in grades 11 and 12 and it received accreditation from Council of International Schools and New England Association of Schools and Colleges) in 2011.

== Recognition ==
- In 2016, to mark its 20th anniversary, CIS launched its solar power initiative. It became the first school in India to be 100% run on solar energy.
- In the year 2017, Canadian International School was recognized as India's first Apple Distinguished School. Recognized by Apple Inc. for meaningful and effective use of technology in teaching and learning.
- In 2018, CIS was recognized by Commonsense.org, as a “Common Sense School” with regards to child protection and digital citizenship education. Many CIS teachers are certified as “Common Sense Educators”.
- In 2020, in response to the global pandemic, CIS was the first in India to host a Drive Through graduation ceremony to honor the accomplishments of its high school seniors.

== School curriculum and faculty ==
Canadian International School started in 1996 with 6 teachers, 13 students but 9 nationalities and over the years the student population has steadily grown. Currently, the school has around 700 students who represent 37 nationalities. The school is considered to have an exceptional student-teacher ratio and the teachers represent about 27 nationalities.

- Elementary School: students follow the Cambridge Primary curriculum in the elementary school.
- Middle School: students follow the Cambridge Secondary 1 curriculum in the middle school with the addition of the Contextual Learning program. The CL activities connect students with local organisations, to develop common projects to impact the world positively and in accordance with the 2020 UN SDG’s.
- High School: the International General Certificate of Education program offered by the University of Cambridge International Examinations^{[15]} is followed by students of grades 9 and 10. CIS offers the International Baccalaureate's Diploma Program for grades 11 and 12.

=== World language programme ===
As an English medium school, CIS offers world language options such as French, Spanish, Hindi, and Mandarin. In addition to world language options, CIS offers mother tongue language in both French and Japanese to those students who qualify. CIS also supports non-native speaks through their EAL (English as additional language) program.

== Affiliations ==
In 2019, CIS joined the Common Ground Collaborative as a member school. CIS is also a member of EARCOS, East Asia Regional Council of Schools. In 2019, CIS founded BAASC (Bangalore Activities and Athletics School Conference), with 4 member schools, to promote interschool athletics among students in of International Schools in Bangalore.

== Remote Learning ==
In March 2020, in response to the worldwide Covid-19 pandemic, CIS immediately moved from in-person classes to a complete remote learning platform to complete the academic year as well as equip students to effectively navigate the transition. CIS hosted India’s first drive through graduation for grade 12 grade students.

== Campus and facilities ==
The CIS campus is located outside of downtown Bangalore, in Yelahanka. The campus is located on the edge of Yelahanka lake and is surrounded by fruit and spice plantations. The campus houses three main academic wings for each of the elementary, middle, and high schools, a 25-meter swimming pool, a 500-seat-capacity state-of-the-art auditorium called the Odeum, three basketball courts, two tennis courts, a badminton court and more. CIS has separate boarding facilities for boys and girls.

== Boarding ==
Pupils in grades 6 to 12 can board at the school. A total of 112 students can be accommodated, boys and girls, in two separate wings. Boarding students share rooms in pairs of the same age/grade.

== Environmental interests ==
Apart from being run 100% on solar power, CIS practices many different conservation and preservation techniques such as rainwater harvesting, water conservation and recycling, a bio gas tank that provides piped gas to a few burners in the cafeteria, 4 food composting units along with an organic garden setup by the elementary school student council. The elementary section implemented other initiatives such as a local clean-up: ‘The Garbage Challenge'.

== Terry Fox Run ==
CIS hosts the annual Terry Fox Run in Bangalore. The run is the legacy of Terry Fox, a Canadian athlete, humanitarian, and cancer research activist. CIS has been hosting a 5 km public run for the past 7 years with the aim to raise awareness and funds for cancer research.

== Extracurricular ==
Students have many avenues to explore extracurricular activities. They presented a choir and orchestra concert at RMZ Galleria Mall, Yelahanka, while performing under the guidance of the music faculty.

Students in drama production have adapted and performed William Shakespeare’s Twelfth Night. Middle school and high school students partake in a competitive inter-school sports tournament - Bangalore Activities and Athletics School Conference (BAASC) - such as the BAASC Swim Meet and the BAASC Girls’ High School Basketball Championships.
