= KLE Society's Law College =

- Established: 1975
- Location: CA-2, Sir M. Vishweshwaraiah Layout, 5th Block, Ullal, Bengaluru, Bengaluru, Karnataka, 560091, India
- Language: English
- Website: www.klelawcollege.org

KLE Society's Law College is a private law school situated in Bangalore, Karnataka, India. It is under the name of KLE and is affiliated to KLE Technological university, Hubballi

== History ==
KLE (short for Karnataka Lingayat Education) Society’s Law College was established in 1975. It started with a 3 Year LL. B. Degree Course, a Five Year Integrated Degree Course in B.A., LL.B was introduced in the year 1996 and 5 year BBA, LL.B was introduced in the year 2011.

== Rankings ==
University rankings

Law – India
- Private colleges
- Outlook India (2022): 11

KLE Society's Law College was ranked 11 among private law colleges in India by Outlook India in 2022.
