= Rai Technology University =

- Type: Private
- Established: 2013
- Location: Doddaballapur, Bangalore, Karnataka, India
- Website: www.raitechuniversity.in

Rai Technology University (RTU) is an Indian private university located in Bangalore, Karnataka, India.

Approved by the Government of Karnataka and the University Grants Commission (UGC), RTU began operations in 2014 under the governance of the Rai Foundation.

== Campus ==
The 85-acre main campus is situated at 11th Mile, Mallohalli, on the Doddaballapura-Nelamangala Main Road.

== Academic Programs ==
RTU offers undergraduate, postgraduate, and PhD programs through the following colleges:

- College of Engineering and Computer Applications
- College of Commerce and Management Studies
- College of Sciences

== Collaborations ==
RTU has established collaborations with institutes and companies both in India and internationally. One notable partnership is the MoU with the Information Sharing and Analysis Center (ISAC), aimed at building credible and ethical cybersecurity professionals under the National Security Database.
