= Dayananda Sagar University =

University in Karnataka, India

- Type: Private
- Established: May 16, 2014; 12 years ago
- Founder: R. Dayananda Sagar
- Accreditation: NAAC A+
- Chancellor: Dr. D. Premachandra Sagar
- Vice-Chancellor: Dr. BS Sathyanarayana
- Registrar: Dr. Puttamadappa C.
- Students: 15,000+
- Location: Devarakaggalahalli, Harohalli, Kanakapura Road, Bangalore, Karnataka, 562112, India
- Campus: 162 acres (66 ha)
- Language: English
- Website: www.dsu.edu.in

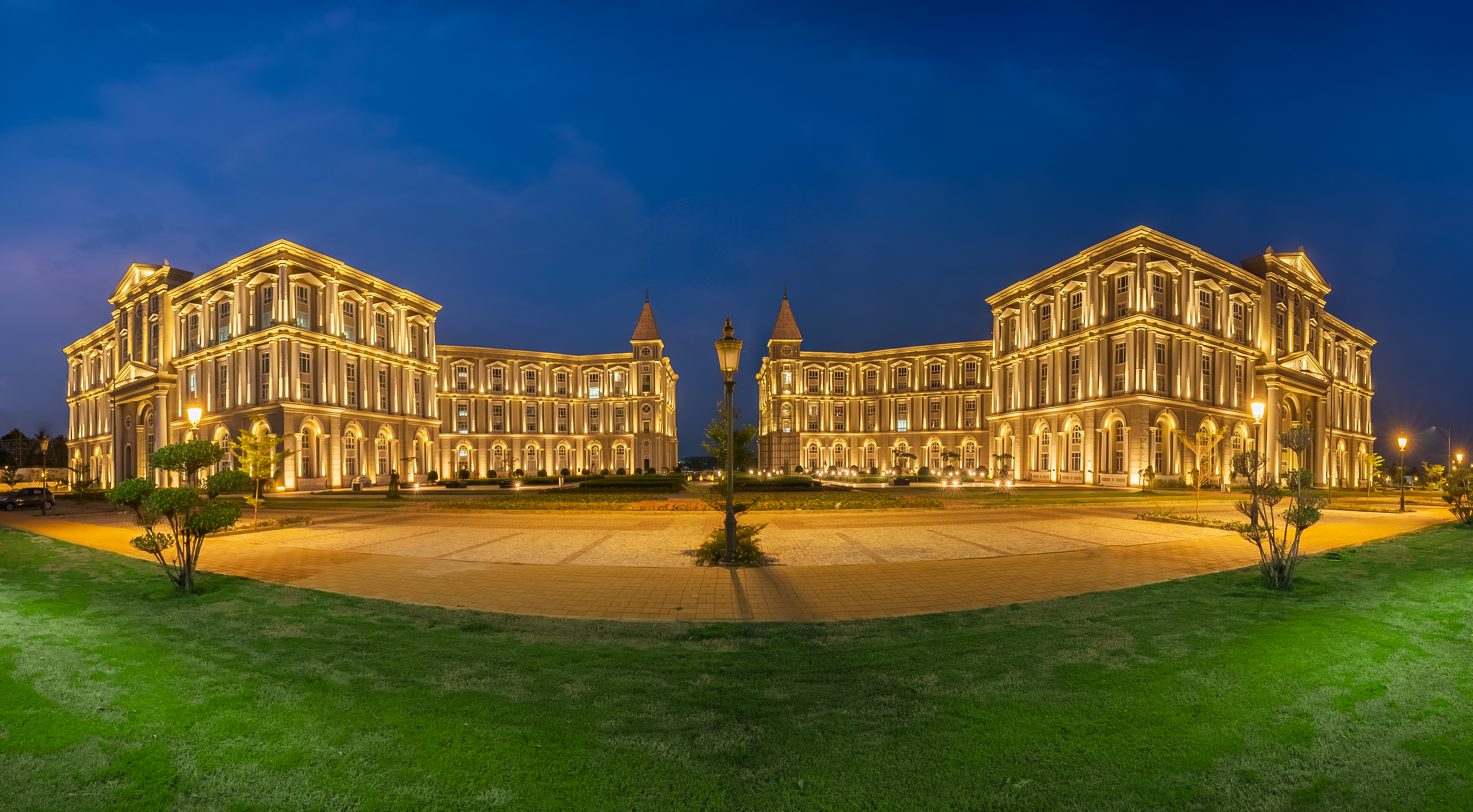

Dayananda Sagar University (DSU), is a private university in Bangalore, Karnataka, India. It offers various undergraduate and postgraduate Engineering, Basic and Applied Science, Arts & Humanities, Designing, Commerce, Health Science, and Law courses.

== Overview ==
The Dayananda Sagar Institutions was founded in the 1960s by late Sri Dayananda Sagar. Dayananda Sagar University offers courses in Engineering, Computer Applications, Sciences, Arts, Commerce, Law and Management in the Bachelors, Masters and Ph.D. levels. Admissions to DSU are done through KCET, COMEDK, and Dayanand Sagar Admission Test (DSAT).
