= NMRKV College for Women =

Women's College in Bangalore

Coordinates: 12°55′56″N 77°34′46″E

NMRKV College
- Type: Public
- Established: 1973
- Affiliations: Bangalore University
- Location: Jayanagar, Bangalore, Karnataka, India
- Campus: Urban
- Website: https://nmkrv.edu.in/

NMKRV College (previously, NMKRV College for Women), was a women's general degree college located at Jayanagar, Bangalore, Karnataka. It is now a co-ed institution offering degrees to both boys and girls. It is established in the year 1973. The college is affiliated with Bangalore University. This college offers different undergraduate and postgraduate courses in arts, science and commerce.

== Departments ==
=== Science ===
- Physics
- Chemistry
- Mathematics
- Botany
- Zoology
- Electronics
- Biotechnology
- Computer Science

=== Arts and Commerce ===
- Kannada
- English
- History
- Political Science
- Sociology
- Economics
- Psychology
- Journalism
- Business Administration
- Commerce

== Accreditation ==
The college is recognized by the University Grants Commission (UGC).
