= NITTE =

University in Mangalore, India

NITTE (Deemed to be University)
- Motto: Quality Education – an Abiding Commitment
- Type: Deemed university
- Established: 2008
- Accreditation: NAAC A+
- Affiliations: UGC
- Chancellor: Vishal Hegde
- Vice-Chancellor: Dr. M. S. Moodithaya
- Location: Mangaluru, Karnataka, India; 12.8076°N 74.8882°E
- Website: nitte.edu.in

NITTE (Deemed to be University) is an institute of higher education and a private deemed university located in Deralakatte, Mangaluru, Karnataka, India. It was established under the Nitte Education Trust, which has founded 31 educational institutions across three campuses in Nitte, Mangaluru, and Bengaluru.

The University Grants Commission which is a Government of India entity conferred the status of Deemed-to-be University in June 2008.

The institution has been accredited with 'A+' grade by the NAAC.

== Academics ==
The AB Shetty Memorial Institute of Dental Sciences (1985) was the first constituent college of Nitte University.

As of June 2026, it has five constituent colleges, the other four being KS Hegde Medical Academy (1999), NGSM Institute of Pharmaceutical Sciences (1983), Nitte Usha Institute of Nursing Sciences (1992), and Nitte Institute of Physiotherapy (1997).

KSH Medical Academy became a constituent of Nitte University in 2009. Recently it has three more constitute colleges namely Nitte Institute of Communication (2012), Nitte Institute of Architecture (2015) and Nitte MAM Institute of Technology (2022).

Nitte University offers over 160 programs at the Undergraduate educations undergraduate, postgraduate, diploma, and PhD levels across various disciplines, including medicine, allied health sciences, dentistry, pharmacy, nursing, physiotherapy, speech and audiology, biological sciences, media and communication, fashion technology, engineering, interior design, architecture, pre-university educations , degree programs, and international schooling. The university operates across three campuses located in Bengaluru, Mangalore and Nitte.

== NITTE Group of Institutions ==
Bengaluru Campus:

- Nitte Meenakshi Institute of Technology, Bengaluru (NMIT)
- Nitte College of Pharmaceutical Science, Bengaluru (NCOPS)
- Dr. Nitte Shankara Adyanthaya Memorial First Grade College, Bengaluru (NSAMFGC)
- Nitte School of Fashion Technology and Interior Design, Bengaluru (NSFTID)
- Nitte School of Architecture, Planning, and Design, Bengaluru (NSAPD)
- Dr. Nitte Shankara Adyanthaya Memorial Pre University College, Bengaluru(NSAMPUC)
- Nitte School of Management, Bengaluru(NSOM)
- Nitte International School, Bengaluru(NIS)

Mangalore Campus

- K.S. Hegde Medical Academy (KSHEMA)
- A.B. Shetty Memorial Institute of Dental Sciences
- Nitte Usha Institute of Nursing Sciences
- Nitte Institute of Physiotherapy
- Nitte Gulabi Shetty Memorial Institute of Pharmaceutical Sciences (NGSMIPS)
- Nitte Institute of Professional Education
- Nitte Institute of Medical Laboratory Sciences
- Nitte Institute of Science and Arts
- Justice K.S. Hegde Institute of Management (JKSHIM)
- Nitte Pre-University College, Mangalore
- Dr. Nitte Shankara Adyanthaya Memorial School
- Nitte Institute of Communication

NITTE Campus

- Dr. Nitte Shankara Adyanthaya Memorial First Grade College (NSAMFGC), Nitte
- NMAM Institute of Technology (NMAMIT)
- Justice K. S. Hedge Institute of Management

== Rankings ==
University and College rankings

General – India
- NIRF (Overall) (2023): 101–150
- NIRF (Universities) (2023): 65

NITTE was ranked 65th among universities and 5th in Dental Category in India by the NIRF in 2023 and in the 101–150 band overall.
