= Presidency University, Bengaluru =

Private university in Karnataka, India

- Motto: Gain more knowledge Reach greater heights
- Type: Private University
- Established: 2013; 13 years ago
- Academic affiliations: UGC, AICTE, BCI, AIU
- Chancellor: Dr. Nissar Ahmed
- Vice-Chancellor: Dr. S. J. Thiruvengadam (I/C)
- Students: 21000
- Undergraduates: 5198
- Postgraduates: 1220
- Location: Bengaluru, Karnataka, India; 13.1682°N 77.5354°E
- Campus: 110 acres (45 ha); Suburban
- Language: English
- Website: presidencyuniversity.in

Presidency University is a private university located in Rajanakunte, Yelahanka, Bengaluru, Karnataka, India. The university offers courses in Engineering, Management, Information Sciences, Design, Commerce, Law, Media Studies, Liberal Arts & Sciences, Allied & Healthcare Professions and Artificial Intelligence & Advanced Computing .

== History ==
Presidency University, established by eminent educationist-philanthropist Dr. Nissar Ahmed, is a private university established under the Presidency University Act (Karnataka State Act no. 41) in 2013 and is a part of the Presidency Group of Institutions.

The Group started its first school in the year 1976 and has gradually expanded to 8 schools, 4 junior colleges, and 1 college across of Bengaluru and Mangalore in Karnataka.

The University is dedicated to innovation and research-oriented teaching methodologies and offers a contemporary curriculum that is industry-ready. Its also Committed to providing interdisciplinary, outcome-based education through a combination of theoretical knowledge, applied science, and experiential learning processes.

== Academics ==
The University began its first batch with Engineering and Management in 2015. It offers 65 + Undergraduate and Postgraduate and Post Graduate Diploma programmes in various fields, including Engineering, Computer Science & Engineering, Management, Commerce, Design, Law, Media Studies, Liberal Arts & Sciences and Allied Health Sciences. The emphasis on academic and sponsored research, actively undertaken by scholars under the guidance of experienced faculty and supported by an efficient research centre, serves as the catalyst for innovation, discovery, and academic excellence.

The Presidency Launchpad Association, a Technology Business Incubator at Presidency University, is a non-profit organization registered as a Section 8 company. It guides and mentors aspiring entrepreneurs by providing facilities and assistance to start, incubate, and successfully run businesses focused on innovation, societal impact, and environmentally relevant technologies.

== Campus ==
Spanning 100 acres of lush greenery, the University is located at Itgalpura near Rajanukunte on the Yelahanka-Dodballapur highway in the north of Bengaluru. The campus is situated 25 kilometres from Kempegowda International Airport and 30 kilometres from the city.

The accent is on creating a conducive and supportive environment for an effective teaching-learning process. To this end, the university provides state-of-the-art infrastructure, including green landscapes, digitally advanced classrooms, futuristic computer labs, multimedia lab, various engineering laboratories, a Centre of Excellence for Research, an internship and placement cell, a 650-seater auditorium, a 500-seater amphitheatre, seminar and conference halls, a cafeteria, a student mess, various food joints across the premises, indoor and outdoor sports facilities, an ATM, and reprographic centres. The University offers dedicated accommodation facilities for both boys and girls and has a fleet of over 60 buses to transport students and faculty to and from various points across the city.

Accreditations and International Rankings

Listed in the QS World University Rankings: Asia in the 1001–1100 band.

National Rankings

Accredited with NAAC ‘A’ Grade.

Ranked 201–300 in Engineering under the National Institutional Ranking Framework (NIRF).

Ranked 101–125 in Management under NIRF.

== International Collaborations ==
Presidency University has forged partnerships with more than 100 premier institutions across 35 countries for various academic and research cooperation. International collaborations provide strategic opportunities for the mutual benefit of the students and faculties of partnering universities to pursue their higher education in various countries across the globe.

== Research ==
University offers various research programs (primarily doctoral, or Ph.D.) for Engineering, Management & Commerce.
