= Karnataka State Open University =

State University in Karnataka

- Type: State university
- Established: 1 June 1996 (30 years ago)
- Affiliations: UGC
- Chancellor: Governor of Karnataka
- Vice-Chancellor: A. P. Gnana Prakash
- Location: Mysuru, Karnataka, India; 12°18′48.3″N 76°37′24.9″E
- Campus: Urban
- Website: ksoumysuru.ac.in

Karnataka State Open University (KSOU) is a distance learning university founded in 1996, located in Mysore in the Indian state of Karnataka.

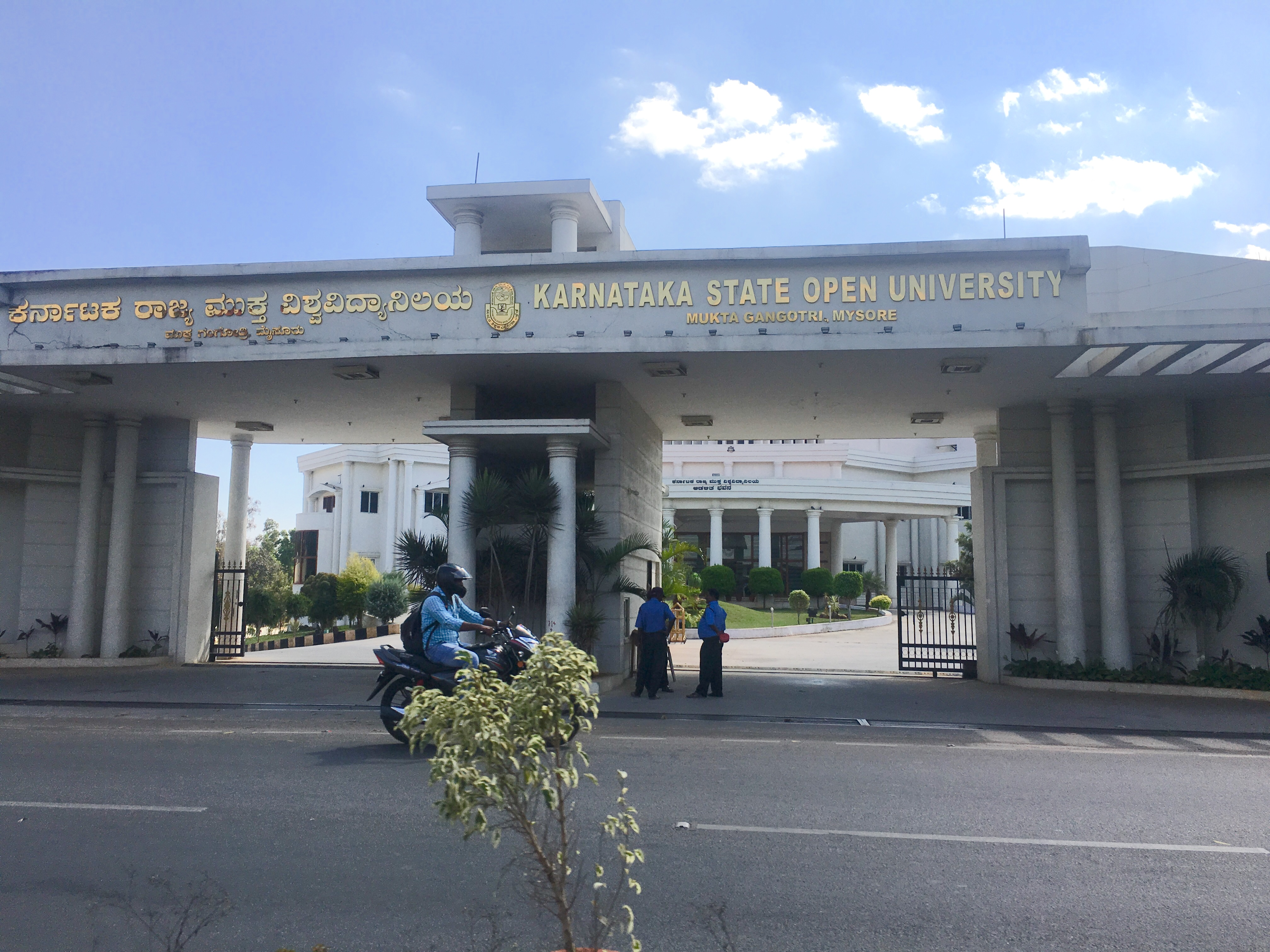
KSOU main entrance

Vice Chancellors
Anjana Murthy, 1996–1999
N. S. Ramegowda, 1999–2003
K. Sudha Rao, 2003–2007
B. A. Viveka Rai, 2007–2009
K. S. Rangappa, 2009–2012
M. G. Krishnan, 2012–2016
D. Shivalingaiah, 2016–2019
Dr. S. Vidyashankar, 2019–2022
Dr. Sharanappa V. Halse, 2022–2025
A. P. Gnana Prakash, 2025–present

== Controversy ==
=== De-recognition and Re-recognition ===
UGC de-recognized several courses of KSOU with effect from 2012-13. The university itself was de-recognized in 2015 after it was found violating several norms of UGC and DEC, IGNOU. The university had violated the norms related to territorial jurisdiction by establishing study centers across India and also offered admission to courses within India and abroad in violation of regulations. Even after a show cause notice was issued, it continued this practice. Thousands of students were jeopardized by the de-recognition, resulting in protests by students and petitions to the Karnataka High Court/ Supreme Court (Supreme Court Case No. 001037 or Diary No. 31227 filed on August 21, 2018). After several initiatives by KSOU and the Government of Karnataka, and as per the direction of the High Court, 17 courses of KSOU were granted recognition from 2018 onwards. However, the lives of earlier students remain in limbo without degrees, though a bridge course and a test is likely to be conducted. In 2018, UGC gave program-level recognition from 2018-19 to 2022-23 via UGC order F. No. 1-6/2018 (DEB-I) dated 03-10-2018 for B. A., B. Com., B. L. I. Sc., M. L. I. Sc., M. A., M. Com., M. Sc.

Non-issuance of degree through Distance Mode from Karnataka State Open University

It has been informed by UGC order F. No. 7-1(KSOU)/2022(DEB-III) dated 16-08-2022 Page - 02 Point: 04 for Non-issuance of degree through Distance mode from Karnataka State Open University that The Open and Distance programs of KSOU were recognized only up to 2012-13 by erstwhile DEC, IGNOU. No further recognition was given to the University till 2017-18. Thereafter it has been granted recognition for the ODL programs for the period 2018-19 to 2022-23 (up to January, 2023 only). Further, the University has only been directed to issue degrees/ certificates as per the period of recognition, territorial jurisdiction and directions issued from time to time by UGC.

=== 2026 examination cheating allegations ===
In October 2026, the university's regional examination centre in Shivamogga faced allegations that students were allowed to use books and mobile phones during undergraduate and postgraduate examinations in exchange for ₹1,000 per subject. The centre's regional director, B. M. Swamy, was accused of allowing students to copy answers in return for money, and members of the public demanded an inspection of the centre by the Higher Education Department and criminal cases against officials found responsible.
