= National Tuberculosis Institute =

Indian Government institute

- Established: 1959
- Officer in charge: Dr. Shobhini Rajan(Director)
- Location: Bangalore, Karnataka, India; 13°0′6″N 77°34′58″E
- Nickname: NTIB
- Website: www.nti.gov.in
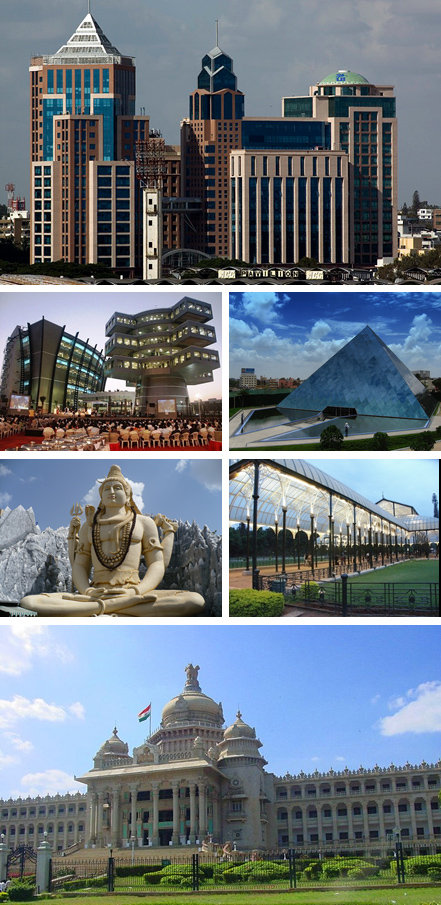

The National Tuberculosis Institute (NTIB) is a Government of India institute, under the Directorate General of Health Services, Ministry of Health and Family Welfare, dedicated to advanced research on Tuberculosis. The Institute is located along Bellary Road, in Bengaluru, Karnataka state, India.

== Profile ==
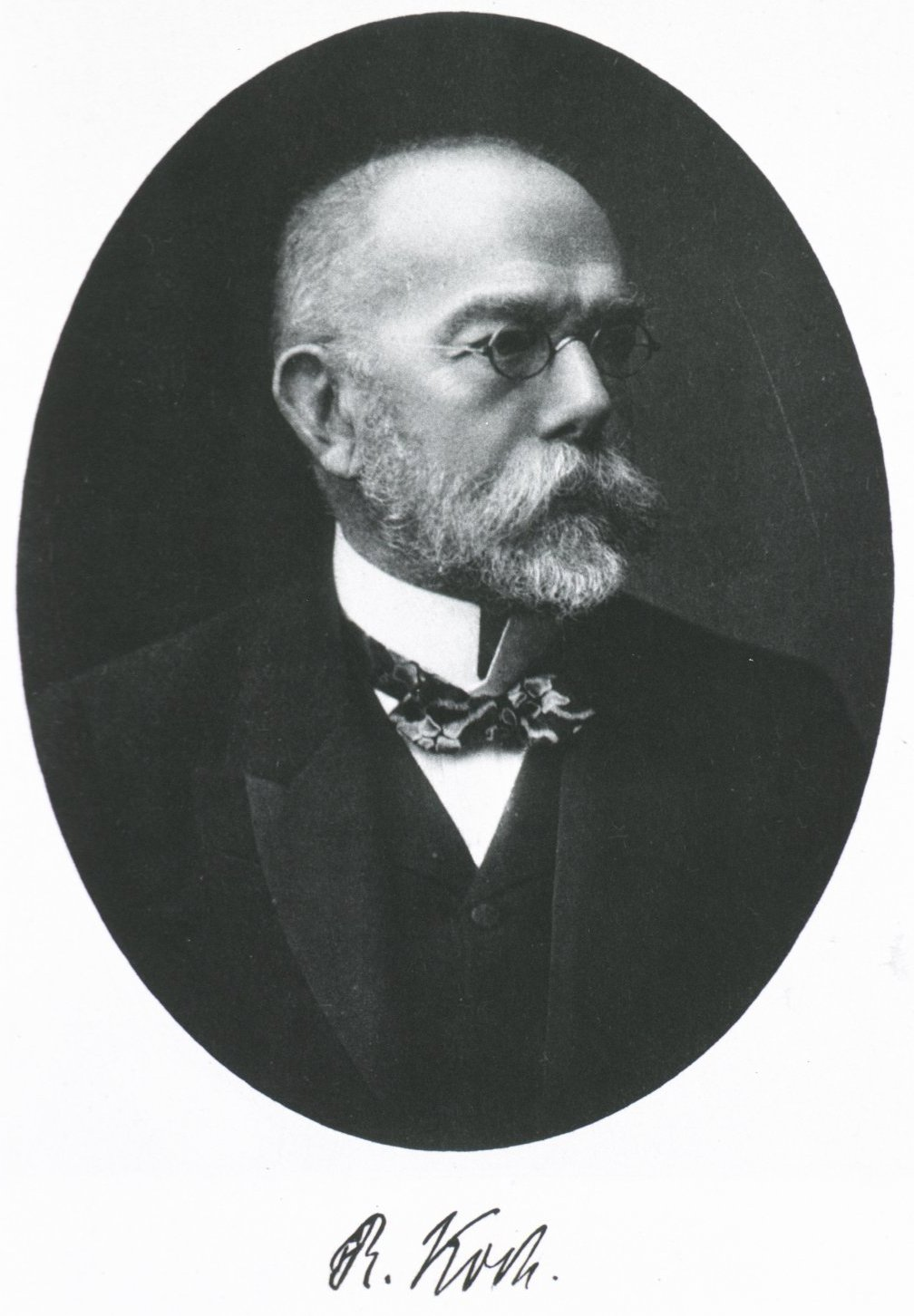
Dr. Robert Koch discovered the tuberculosis bacillus.

The National Tuberculosis Institute owes its origin to the findings of a 1955–1958 survey conducted by the Indian Council of Medical Research (ICMR) where high incidence of pulmonary tuberculosis was found across the country. Acting on the survey findings, the Government of India initiated actions to start an advanced research institute solely dedicated to the cause and, as a result, NTIB was established in 1959, on a property, Avalon, donated by the then Maharajah of Mysore. The technical assistance was provided by the World Health Organization and the Institute procured the equipment through UNICEF assistance.

The Institute has, ever since, been active in research projects and studies and has been successful in formulating a TB Control Program for the country which incorporates the clinical, epidemiological and sociological aspects of the disease. It is involved in activities such as training of medical and paramedical staff and personnel across the country, formulating policies and programs in accordance with the WHO recommended DOTS strategies, planning, coordinating and executing research on the disease and its epidemiology, monitoring of programs, campaigns and impacts and documentation and dissemination of knowledge through print and audio-visual media.

The Institute was accredited as a WHO Collaborating Centre for TB research and training in 1985.

== Programs ==
=== Training programs ===
Tuberculosis (TB) is a potentially fatal contagious disease that can affect almost any part of the body but is mainly an infection of the lungs. It is caused by a bacterial microorganism, the tubercle bacillus or Mycobacterium tuberculosis. Although TB can be treated, cured, and can be prevented if persons at risk take certain drugs, scientists have never come close to wiping it out. Few diseases have caused so much distressing illness for centuries and claimed so many lives.

The primary activity of the Training Department of the Institute is to train the medical and paramedical personnel, both as career-based and in-service courses, to groom them for training the staff working at the primary health centres and other lower strata medical facilities in the country. The course, Training of Trainers (TOT), is a two-week course, open to medical and paramedical personnel in the District Medical Centres and medical colleges. The other training courses offered by the Institute are:

- State TB Training and Demonstration Centre (STDC) Training: Three week course for STDC personnel such as Epidemiologists, Bacteriologists, Statisticians, TB specialists and trainers.
- RNTCP Modular Training: The course is designed as modular and is aimed at Senior Treatment Supervisors (STS) and Senior TB Laboratory Supervisors (STLS) and other training officers of the District Medical Centres.
- Training for Program Managers: Two week program for the Senior TB Officers (STO) and the Medical Officers (MO) aimed at developing the managerial and computer skills.
- Post graduate Training: 10-day program for the master's degree students in Community Medicine, Chest Medicine and General Medicine and the mode of training is through practicals and presentations.
- Training for NGOs and Private Practitioners: Two day course for private practitioners and NGOs as per recommendations from the State or Central TB Divisions.
- Training of WHO Fellows: This is a special program for WHO Fellows and is conducted on request and recommendation from WHO.

NTIB also conducts regular seminars, workshops and conference for easy dissemination of knowledge and information.

=== Research programs ===
In 2007, the prevalence of TB per 100,000 people was highest in sub-Saharan Africa, and was also relatively high in Asia.

NTIB undertakes research programs on a regular basis, two of the current programs are:

Capture-recapture to estimate incidence, periodic prevalence and completeness of Tuberculosis cases reporting under RNTCP in Tumkur district: The program aims to estimate the incidence and period prevalence of the disease in Tumkur district in Karnataka and arrive at the case finding efficiency of the Revised National Tuberculosis Control Program (RNTCP). The research methodology is based on capture-recapture method where the patient record is compared with various other data sources.

Challenges in implementation of diagnostic algorithm for patients having symptoms suggestive of pulmonary TB with smear negative report initial sputum examination: The project is focussed on preparing a database of smear test negative patients under RNTCP in the districts of Mysore, Mandya, Chikkamangalur and Shimoga, chart out the system and patient constraints and to document the behavioural patterns of the patients for preparing a diagnostic algorithm. The methodology deployed is random sampling and interview and comparison of the data with the lab registers maintained at the District Medical Centres (DMCs).

=== Monitoring programs ===
The monitoring program of NTIB covers the whole of India except the Union Territories of Daman and Diu and Lakshadweep under National Tuberculosis Programme (NTP) and Revised National Tuberculosis Programme (RNTCP). The program covers monitoring of data of smear positive and Smear negative case detections, sputum positive cases and treatment success rate.

== Library ==
NTIB Library, established in 1960, is the knowledge repository of the Institute and acts as the Information Support Centre of the Institute and oversees the publications and the dissemination of information. It is accessible to the faculty and staff of the Institute, trainees, medical students, research scholars, health care providers, patients and public. The Library stocks 4,000 reference books and 10,000 bound volumes on Tuberculosis related topics such as Public Health, Radiology, Bacteriology, Statistics, Sociology, Epidemiology, Fugitive and Grey literature. It subscribes to 20 international and 35 national periodicals and has a collection of 120 audiovisual packages, 700 slides, 30 CDs and 150 transparencies, other than the NTIB publications.

== Publications ==
NTIB has published many books, leaflets and journals related to tuberculosis and its control mechanisms.

- Shashidhara AN (1980). An introduction to tuberculin testing and BCG vaccination. IBH Prakashana. Archived from the original on 25 July 2014.
- Krishna Murthy VV (1991). Facts and figures on tuberculosis and National Tuberculosis Programme. TNIB. Archived from the original on 27 February 2021.
- Krishna Murthy MS, Shashidhara AN (1992). A manual for tuberculin testers and readers. TNIB. Archived from the original on 27 February 2021.
- Shashidhara AN, Chaudhuri K (1990). Tuberculin skin test - emerging 100 years since its first use. TNIB. Archived from the original on 27 February 2021.
- Mahadev B, Balasangameshwara VH (1995). What you should know about tuberculosis – Its diagnosis, treatment and prevention. TNIB. Archived from the original on 27 February 2021.
- Balasangameshwara VH; Sujatha Chandrasekaran; Sophia Vijay; Suryanarayana L (1995). TB & HIV. TNIB. Archived from the original on 27 February 2021.
- TNIB (1996). Guidelines for laboratory procedures in tuberculosis – a chart. TNIB. Archived from the original on 27 February 2021.
- Jagota P, Srikantaramu N (1997). Summaries of NTI studies. TNIB. Archived from the original on 27 February 2021.
- Suryanarayana HV, Chadha VK (1998). Childhood Tuberculosis. TNIB. Archived from the original on 27 February 2021.
- Chauhan MM; Mahadev B & Balasangameshwara VH (1998). Manual on isolation, identification and sensitivity testing of Mycobacterium tuberculosis. TNIB. Archived from the original on 27 February 2021.

NTIB has also brought out several manuals, guides and other publications.

1. Manual for Census Takers - 1960
2. Manual for the BCG Vaccinator - 1960
3. Manuals for the key personnel of District Tuberculosis Programme viz., Introduction, District Tuberculosis Officers, Treatment Organisers, Statistical Assistants, X ray Technicians and Peripheral Health Institutions - 1963
4. Periodical Abstract Bulletin (for internal circulation only) - introduced from the year 1967
5. Summaries of NTI studies Vol I & II 1976 & 1977
6. Summaries of Tuberculosis Research Centre studies Vol I & II 1976 & 1977
7. Report of the WHO-Government of India Workshop on Tuberculosis and Primary Health Care - 1981
8. Establishment and functioning of a Tuberculosis Culture Laboratory - 1983
9. NTI Souvenir - 1985
10. Proceedings of the NTI Silver Jubilee Celebrations - 1985
11. Tuberculosis: its diagnosis and treatment for lay persons - 1985
12. Participation of General Medical Practitioners - a key to success of National Tuberculosis Programme - 1985
13. Scientific Report 1980–89 - 1990
14. Guidelines for Medical Officers of Peripheral Health Institutions on National Tuberculosis Programme – Chart - 1990
15. Introduction to District Tuberculosis Programme - 1994
16. Manual for District Tuberculosis Officers - 1994
17. Manual for Treatment Organisers - 1994
18. Manual for Laboratory Technicians - 1994
19. Manual for Statistical Assistants - 1994
20. Manual for X-ray Technicians - 1994
21. Manual for Peripheral Health Institutions - 1994

== See also ==
- Robert Koch
- World Tuberculosis Day
- Global Plan to Stop Tuberculosis
