= Kristu Jayanti University =

Private research university

Kristu Jayanti (Deemed University)
- Motto: "Light and Prosperity"
- Type: Private Deemed University
- Established: 1999; 27 years ago
- Founder: Carmelites of Mary Immaculate (CMI)
- Accreditation: NAAC A++ Grade, CGPA: 3.78/4
- Religious affiliation: Syro-Malabar Catholic Church
- Academic affiliations: UGC; AICTE; Bengaluru North University (2017–2025); Bangalore University (1999–2017)
- Chancellor: Rev. Fr. Santhosh Mathenkunnel CMI
- Vice-Chancellor: Fr. Dr. Augustine George, CMI
- Total staff: 788
- Students: 16000+
- Location: K. Narayanapura Post, Kothanur, Bengaluru, Karnataka, 560077, India; 13.058°N 77.642°E
- Campus: 50 acres (20 ha); Urban
- Language: English
- Rankings: NIRF India: Ranked 34 (2025); NIRF Karnataka: Ranked 1(2025)
- Colors: Blue and Gold
- Nickname: Jayantian
- Sporting affiliations: Formerly BNU (2017–2025); Formerly Bangalore University (1999–2017); AIU (2025–present)
- Website: Official Website www.kristujayanti.edu.in
- Location in Bengaluru Location in Karnataka Location in India

Kristu Jayanti University is a private deemed university in Bengaluru, Karnataka, India. It was established in 1999, and is managed by the CMI Fathers of St. Joseph Province, Kottayam.

The University is recognised by the University Grants Commission (UGC) under the Section 3 and categories 2(f) & 12(B) when it was a College. It was accorded autonomous status in 2013 until 2025 by the UGC, the government of Karnataka and the Bengaluru North University. Until the 1999 till 2017 it was part of Bangalore University and Then Trifurcated into different Universities and became part of Bengaluru North University till 2025.The National Assessment and Accreditation Council has accredited Kristu Jayanti (Deemed to be University), now with A++ grade It was received in 2021 When it was Autonomous College. The college (now university) has been rated with a cumulative grade point average (CGPA) of 3.78 out of 4 in the third cycle of accreditation. It is the second institution in the country and the first in Karnataka to achieve the highest CGPA. Kristu Jayanti Deemed to be University was ranked 60th among colleges in India by the National Institutional Ranking Framework in 2024 And was ranked 34th among college category (when it was college) in India by the National Institutional Ranking Framework in 2025 which is rank 1 College in Karnataka in 2025 and Surpassing The Other Well Known College in Karnataka like St Aloysius, Mount Carmel College Autonomous, St Joseph College

== History ==
Kristu Jayanti, founded in 1999, is run by the Bodhi Niketan Trust, formed by the members of St. Joseph Province of the Carmelites of Mary Immaculate. Reaccredited with the highest grade 'A++' by NAAC in 2021. Recognized by UGC under the category 2(f) & 12(B).

=== Autonomous & Deemed to be University Status ===
Kristu Jayanti has become an autonomous college from the academic year 2013–14. It continues to be an affiliated college of the Banglore University till 2017 when it was Trifurcated and became part of Bengaluru North University. The university offers the degrees to the students after passing the examinations held by the college. On 8 July 2025, this College was granted the Status of the Deemed University, as per the notification dated July 8, 2025, vide letter No. 9-13/2025 - U.3(A) under the Section 3 of University Grants Commission Act, 1956. After Granting Deemed University Status it was Disaffiliated With Bengaluru North University and Remained Independent Status.

=== Achievements & Ranking ===
- NIRF India: Ranked 34 (2025)
- NIRF Karnataka: Ranked 1 (2025)
- NAAC India: Ranked 8
- NAAC Karnataka: Ranked 3
- NAAC Bengaluru: Ranked 2
- NAAC Accreditation Grade: A++
- NAAC CGPA: 3.78/4
- CBSE Parents Handbook Ranking Karnataka (Arts, Science & Commerce): 6
- CBSE All India Parents Handbook Ranking (Commerce & Finance): 19
- CBSE All India Parents Handbook Ranking (Management): 30
- Ministry of Education, India – Autonomous college (2013–2025)
- Ministry of Education, India – Deemed-to-be University (since 2025)
- UNAI HUB for SDG1
- International accreditation by ACBSP

== Kristu Jayanti School of Law and Institute of Management ==
Kristu Jayanti School of Law is located in K. Narayanapura, Kothanur, in the northern part of Bengaluru, Karnataka, India. It was established in 2022 as a dedicated legal education wing of Kristu Jayanti University, which itself was founded in 1999. The law college is managed by the Bodhi Niketan Trust, an educational body formed by members of the Carmelites of Mary Immaculate (CMI), a Roman Catholic religious congregation.

Kristu Jayanti School of Law offers five-year integrated law programs, including: - Bachelor of Arts and Bachelor of Laws (B.A., LL.B.) - Bachelor of Commerce and Bachelor of Laws (B.Com., LL.B.) - Bachelor of Business Administration and Bachelor of Laws (B.B.A., LL.B.)

The Institute of Management and is accredited by the National Assessment and Accreditation Council (NAAC) with an A++ grade, holding a CGPA of 3.78/4. The MBA program is also accredited by the Accreditation Council for Business Schools and Programs.

== Student support and campus life ==
=== Research ===
The university has a wide range of Research programmes funded by DST, UGC, and other government and private agencies.

=== Faculty ===
Faculty improvement is facilitated through programmes like in–house Faculty Development Programme (FDP), department-level programmes and Participation in FDPs / Conferences/ Seminars at other institutions and colleges. The institution encourages the faculty members to participate and undertake institutional research and to pursue personal research leading to M.Phil. and Ph.D.

== Campus ==
Kristu Jayanti(Deemed to be University) is located at K.Narayanapura, Bangalore, 11 KM away from Vidhana Soudha, the heart of Bangalore City.

The library also has digital resources including a collection of CDs, databases, e-journals, software and projects. There are separate rooms for group discussion, reading and cubicles for personal study. Moreover, an e-library has been set up for e-resource. The Computer lab is equipped with internet and is open beyond office hours to meet students’ computing needs. The campus is equipped with wi-fi facility. The department of Life Sciences features four laboratories for Genetics, Biochemistry, Biotechnology and Microbiology.

== Student life ==
The college has formed several academic clubs and associations like Environment Club, Commerce Club, Management Association, Tourism Club, Computer Academy, Psychology Club, Erudite Club, Journalism Club, Film Club, Photography Club, Life Science Club, Jayantian Life Science Forum, etc.

The Center for Social Activities (CSA) was established in 2009 as a students’ social movement.
