= Alliance University =

University in Bangalore, India

Coordinates: 12.729394°N 77.7093°E

- Coat of arms
- Former name: Alliance Business Academy (1995) Alliance Business School (2005)
- Motto: Gyanashya Shaktihi Buddhaiya Prakasham (Sanskrit)
- Motto in English: The Strength of Knowledge is the Light to Wisdom; is a Sanctum of Higher Learning
- Type: Private University
- Established: 1995; 31 years ago
- Affiliations: UGC, IACBE, AACSB, AICTE, BCI, AIU, NAAC,
- Chancellor: Premanand Shetty
- Vice-Chancellor: B. Priestly Shan
- Pro-Chancellor: Abhay G. Chebbi
- Academic staff: 428
- Students: 10424
- Undergraduates: 7940
- Postgraduates: 2128
- Doctoral students: 356
- Location: Anekal, Bengaluru, Karnataka, India
- Campus: Urban, 55 acres (0.2 km^{2})
- Language: English
- Colors: Maroon, Navy blue, White
- Website: alliance.edu.in

Alliance University is a private university in Karnataka, India. The university offers undergraduate, postgraduate and doctoral programmes in business, engineering, technology, liberal arts, applied mathematics, commerce, and law under the aegis of its various constituent colleges.

== Description ==
Originally established in 1995 as Alliance Business Academy, the institution later transformed into Alliance Business School in 2005. Through the enactment of the Karnataka State Act No. 34 in 2010, the school attained the status of a university and is recognized by the University Grants Commission (UGC), New Delhi. Alliance Business School Pvt. Ltd supports the growth and development of the university.

The central campus is located on Chandapura-Anekal Main Road in Bangalore City. The campus also includes sporting facilities, an administrative block, central library, learning center, labs, fitness and activity center, multiple food outlets, and halls of residents for its students.

The university's constituent schools offer undergraduate, postgraduate, executive, and doctoral degree programs and several professional certificate programs. Alliance University offers online degree programs recognized by the UGC's Distance Education Bureau. The university is recognized as a Scientific and Industrial Research Organisation by the Ministry of Science and Technology. In the 2025 National Institutional Ranking Framework, Alliance University placed 20th in the Law category and 71st in the Management category.

Alliance University launched the "Quantum AI School for Advanced Research", at its campus in Electronic City, Bengaluru. The school is intended to reflect the University’s strategic commitment to shaping the future of computational and engineering sciences, and establishing a strong presence in next-generation technology research.

== Controversies ==
In February 2016, founder-chancellor Madhukar G. Angur was arrested on rape charges, then released, and further rape allegations were made again in the next month.

Around April 2016 Madhukar G. Angur was fired as chancellor and replaced by his brother, Sudhir G. Angur, and by June the power struggle within the family for control led to the university being closed for two weeks and semester-end exams were indefinitely postponed. The university went on holidays two more times in 2016; in September Madhukar Angur forcibly took back the chancellorship, and the next month his brother forcibly took it back.

In November 2016 a government-appointed investigation by M.I. Savadatti reported that it found that between 2010 and 2016 Madhukar G. Angur had been "deeply involved in committing huge financial irregularities causing wrongful loss to Alliance University a total amount of INR 107 Crore" (around US$14 million).

Students and their families began to request refunds, and appealed to the government of Karnataka to intervene. The government had no legal right to intervene in a private university, and in November worked to change the law so that it could. In December 2017 the government appointed an administrator with unspecified tenure.

In October 2019, Alliance University's co-founder and former chancellor, Sudhir Angur was arrested in connection with the murder investigation of former Vice-Chancellor Ayyappa Dore. The case received significant national media attention and was linked to an ongoing dispute regarding the university's administration and ownership. Police subsequently arrested multiple suspects as part of the investigation.

== Major events ==
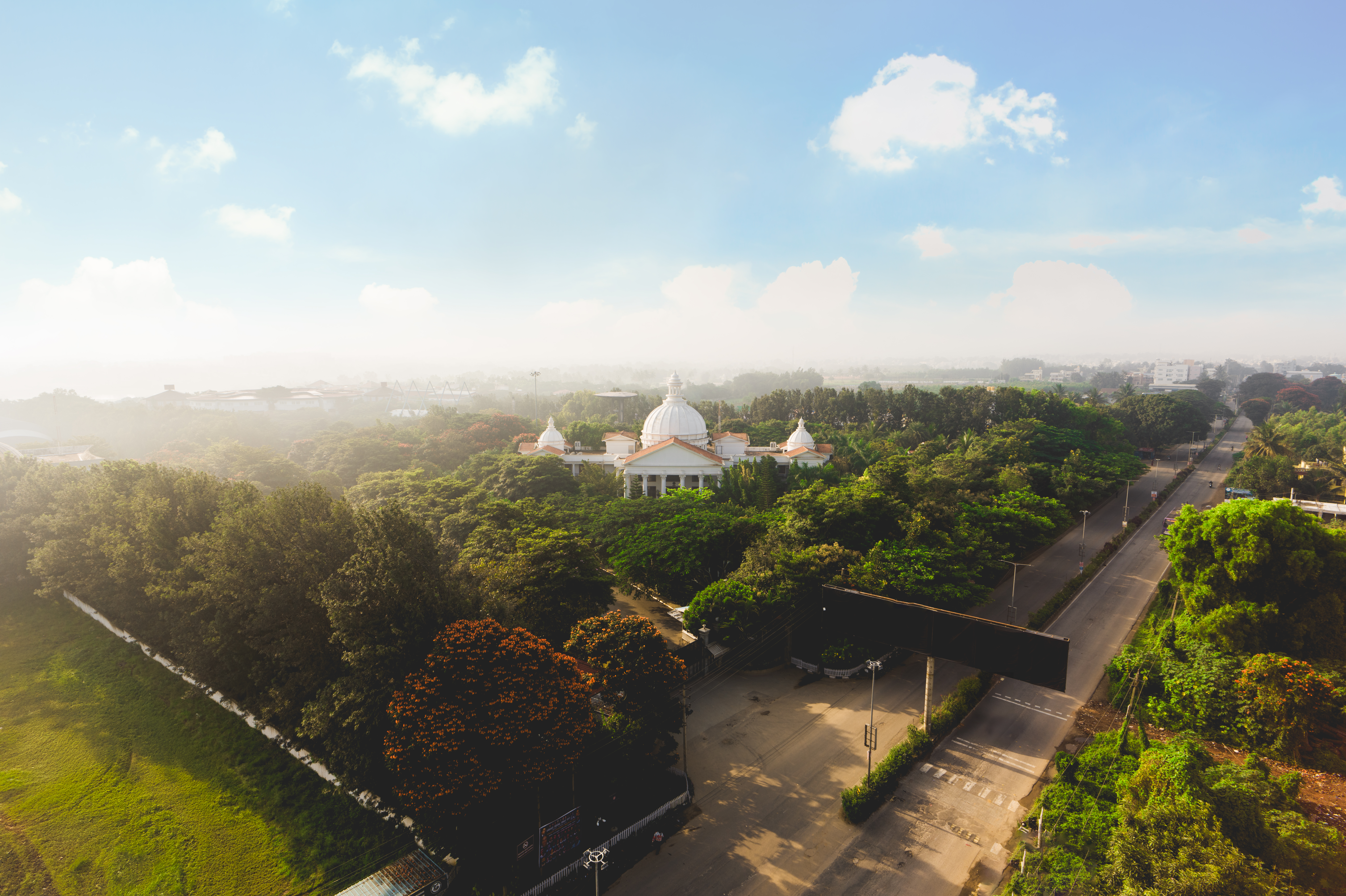
The campus of Alliance University spans 60+ acres

From February 19 to 21, 2026, Alliance University hosted the 5th edition of ALF 2026 and the 4th edition of Alliance ONE, bringing together two of the University’s flagship events in a confluence of technology, culture, and sports.

The festival featured sixteen major techno-cultural events and thirteen high-octane sports events, each curated by the various schools of the University and aligned with the 17 Sustainable Development Goals (SDGs).

The 2026 edition featured speakers and performers such as Margaret Alva, Vidya Balan, Shobana, and Gul Panag. Over the years, the festival has also welcomed eminent personalities including Shashi Tharoor, Anil Kumble, Javed Akhtar, Rajdeep Sardesai, Anju Bobby George, Barkha Dutt, and Devdutt Pattanaik.

Previous editions were held in 2025 under the theme The Asian Century; in 2024 under the banner of AI Confest; and earlier in November 2022 and May 2022 as the Asia Pacific Literary Festival and Alliance Literary Festival, respectively. Across these editions, the festival has featured authors, translators, performers, cultural events, and thought leaders from around the world.

In addition, on January 21, 2023, Alliance University hosted a TEDx event themed Beyond Boundaries.

== Corporate social responsibility ==
=== Alliance Vidya Spandana 2025 ===
For the 2025–26 academic year, the Alliance Vidya Spandana initiative supported seven students from economically weaker sections through full tuition fee waivers, alongside internship and career-development opportunities.
