= Bengaluru North University =

State University in Karnataka

- ಬೆಂಗಳೂರು ಉತ್ತರ ವಿಶ್ವವಿದ್ಯಾಲಯ.
- Latin: Universitas Bengaluru Septentrionalis
- Other name: North Bangalore University
- Motto: "ಅನುಚರ ಅಂತರದೃಷ್ಟಿ" (Anuchara Antaradṛṣṭi)
- Motto in English: Follower of Inner Vision
- Type: Public
- Established: 2017; 9 years ago
- Accreditation: NAAC
- Affiliations: UGC, AIU, AICTE, AQA, NAAC, ACU, NBA
- Chancellor: Governor of Karnataka
- Vice-Chancellor: B. K. Ravi
- Students: Around 5,000-8,000+
- Location: Tamaka Kolar, Karnataka, India
- Campus: Urban
- Website: bnu.karnataka.gov.in/english

Bengaluru North University (BNU) is a collegiate public state university located in Tamaka, near NH 75 in Kolar, Karnataka, India. The university was established in 2017 by the Government of Karnataka through the Karnataka State Universities (Amendment) Act, 2015 trifurcating Bangalore University by creating Bengaluru North University and Bengaluru Central University (later Bengaluru City University).

== History ==
Venugopal K R, UVCE Alumni, Principal UVCE was the Special Officer to the Government of Karnataka for Trifurcating Bangalore University which had over 600 affiliated colleges. He submitted the report on 26 March 2015 for restructuring Bangalore University into Bangalore University, Bengaluru City University and Bengaluru North University. In 2012, C. T. Ravi, the Minister For Higher Education, Government of Karnataka, announced plans to bifurcate 300 colleges out of the university by creating Bengaluru North University. Requests to following the original recommendation or even create four universities were made. In May 2015 the government announced it will follow the original recommendation and create Bengaluru North University and Bengaluru Central University, with about 200 colleges assigned to each of them. The Bill was passed in July 2015 and the university was inaugurated on 21 September 2017 and T. D. Kemparaju was appointed Vice-Chancellor (VC). Niranjan Vanalli was appointed VC in November 2021.

== Vogue Institute of Art & Design ==
The Vogue Institute of Art & Design is a design school run by Manduda Educational Trust, a charitable organization based in Bangalore, Karnataka. It is affiliated to Bengaluru North University. and recognized by University of Mysore and University of Sunderland, UK. It was established in 1996 by Dr. M.M. Kariappa. The institute runs under Manduda Educational Trust, a charitable organization. The institute was the first to initiate a degree program in fashion designing in the year 1999 with Bangalore University. The institute is ISO 9001:2008 certified and affiliated to Bengaluru North University. Vogue Institute of Art and Design was formerly known as Vogue Institute of Fashion Technology.

In 2018, Vogue expanded its realm and launched Dr Kariappa School of Art and Design Management, recognized by AICTE. The institute provides MBA programs with different streams.

Vogue Institute of Art & Design is in collaborated with international education institutes such as De Montfort University UK, University of Sunderland UK, and Accademia Del Lusso Italy. The institute provides opportunities to interact with international institutes and its faculty members.

== Academics ==
The university has 289 affiliated colleges. Affiliation to the three universities is based on Karnataka Legislative Assembly constituencies. BNU affiliating all colleges under Devanahalli, Doddaballapur and Hoskote Assembly constituencies in Bengaluru Rural district; K R Puram, Pulikeshinagar, Sarvagnanagar, C V Raman Nagar and Mahadevapura Assembly constituencies in Bengaluru Urban district; Gauribidanur, Bagepalli, Chikkaballapur, Sidlaghatta and Chintamani Assembly constituencies in Chikkaballapur district; Srinivaspur, Mulbagal, KGF, Bangarpet, Kolar and Malur Assembly constituencies in Kolar district.

== Campus ==
The university will operate for academic year 2017–18 from temporary offices in the campus of Karnataka State Open University at Tamaka on the outskirts of Kolar. A permanent campus will be constructed at Amaravathi village in Chickballapur district.
