= Jyoti Nivas College =

Women's degree college in Bangalore, India

Jyoti Nivas College (Autonomous)
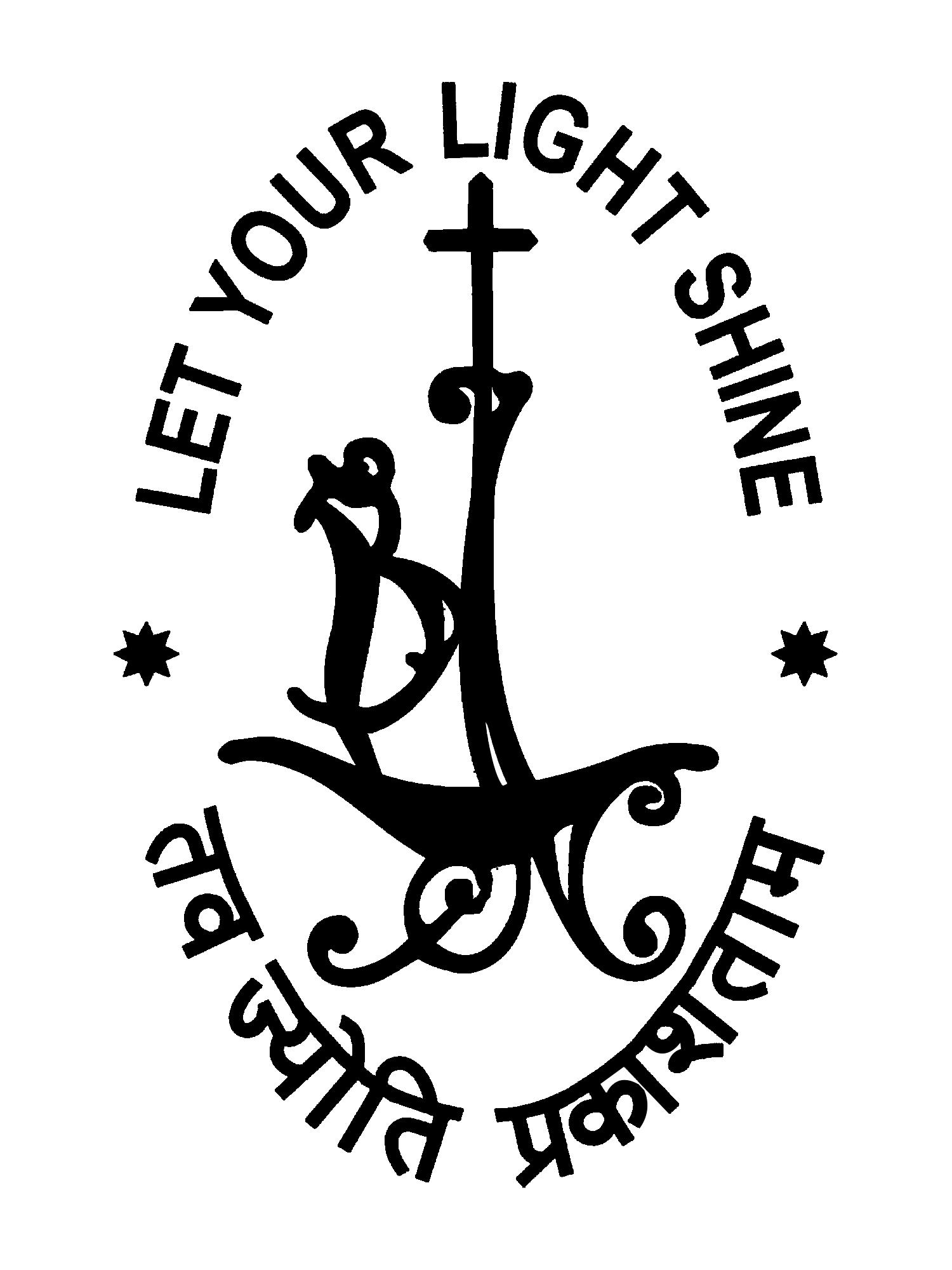
- Jyoti Nivas College Logo
- Motto: "Let Your Light Shine"
- Type: Autonomous Women's College
- Established: 1966; 60 years ago
- Founder: Sisters of St. Joseph of Tarbes
- Accreditation: NAAC A+ (CGPA 3.43)
- Affiliations: Bengaluru City University
- Religious affiliation: Catholic
- Principal: Dr. Sr. Mary Louisa S.
- Location: Hosur Road, Koramangala, Bengaluru, Karnataka, 560095, India; 12.9352°N 77.6189°E
- Campus: Urban
- Website: www.jyotinivas.org

Jyoti Nivas College (Autonomous) is a Catholic women's higher education institution located in Bengaluru, Karnataka, India. Established in 1966 by the Sisters of St. Joseph, the college offers undergraduate, postgraduate and vocational programmes across arts, science, commerce and management.

The institution received autonomous status from Bangalore University in 2004 and is currently affiliated to Bengaluru City University. It is accredited with an A+ grade (CGPA 3.43) by the National Assessment and Accreditation Council (NAAC) and was recognised as a College of Excellence by the University Grants Commission (UGC) in 2014 for academic performance, research output and quality initiatives.

Jyoti Nivas College is frequently listed among leading women's autonomous colleges in Bangalore in national surveys and education rankings.

== History ==
The Sisters of St. Joseph of Tarbes arrived in Bangalore in 1882 and worked at Bowring Hospital. Observing the need for women’s education, they founded Jyoti Nivas College in 1966.

== Academics ==
The academic structure of Jyoti Nivas College is organised into several schools that offer a variety of undergraduate and postgraduate programmes.

== Admissions ==
Admissions to undergraduate and postgraduate programmes at Jyoti Nivas College Autonomous are conducted based on merit and institutional admission guidelines, in accordance with the regulations of Bengaluru City University.

The college follows a transparent admission process for its programmes in arts, science, commerce, management, and vocational studies.

== Rankings and reputation ==
Jyoti Nivas College appears in several national and regional higher-education surveys.

- Listed by EducationWorld among notable private autonomous colleges in India.
- Featured in India Today's Best Colleges Survey in Arts, Science, Commerce and Management categories.
- Ranked and reviewed by Collegedunia and Careers360.

== Campus ==
The campus features smart classrooms, science laboratories, a media studio, library, auditorium, sports facilities and hostels. It also hosts cultural festivals, academic conferences and student-led events.

== Library and Information Centre ==
The Library and Information Centre at Jyoti Nivas College supports the academic curriculum of the institution. It provides learning resources aligned with the courses and programmes offered by the college and aims to supplement classroom instruction and research activities. The library maintains a collection of materials selected to meet the academic requirements of students and faculty.

== Notable alumni ==
- Aishani Shetty, Kannada actress
- Andaleeb Wajid, novelist, Writer
- Ashika Ranganath, Kannada actress
- Neethu Shetty, Kannada actress
- Reeshma Nanaiah, Kannada actress
- Ramya Barna, Kannada actress
- Rajshri Ponnappa, Kannada actress
- Sonajharia Minz, Mathematician, computer scientist, researcher activist
- Saarah Hameed Ahmed, Pilot
- Kruttika Nadig, Indian chess player
