= Brindavan College of Engineering =

Engineering Institution in Bangalore, India

Brindavan College of Engineering (BrCE)
- Type: Private Un-Aided Engineering College
- Established: 2008
- Affiliations: Visweswaraiah Technological University
- Chairman: Dr. B. R. Shetty
- Location: Bangalore, Karnataka, India; 13.126°N 77.620°E
- Campus: 20 km from Bangalore at Yelahanka.
- Approvals: AICTE
- Website: brindavancollege.edu.in

Brindavan College of Engineering (also referred to as BrCE) is an engineering college in Bangalore, Karnataka, India. The college is affiliated to the Visvesvaraya Technological University, Belgaum and approved by the AICTE, New Delhi. The campus is 1 km from Baglur cross, on the way to Baglur on Hyderabad-Bangalore NH 7.

== History ==
BrCE was started by Dr. Majed A.A. Sabha, in 2008 after the success of Brindavan Group of Institutions in 1992. B.R Shetty Venture.

== Courses offered ==
=== Undergraduate programme ===
- Bachelor of Engineering (BE)

=== Postgraduate programme ===
- Master of Business Administration (MBA)
- Master of Computer Application (MCA)
- Master of Technology (M.Tech.)
