= Bengaluru City University =

State University in Karnataka

Coordinates: 12.97482°N 77.58362°E

Dr. Manmohan Singh Bengaluru City University
- Former names: Bengaluru City University; Bengaluru Central University
- Motto: Be Boundless
- Type: State university
- Established: 2017; 9 years ago
- Chancellor: Governor of Karnataka
- Vice-Chancellor: Ramesh B.
- Location: Bengaluru, Karnataka, India
- Website: https://bcu.karnataka.gov.in/

Dr. Manmohan Singh Bengaluru City University (DMSBCU), formerly Bengaluru City University, is a collegiate public state university located in Bengaluru, Karnataka, India. It was formed in 2017 and renamed in 2025 in the honour of Dr Manmohan Singh, former Prime Minister of India.

== History ==
The university was formed in 2017 following the trifurcation of Bangalore University, Dr. Venugopal K R, UVCE Alumni, Principal UVCE was the Special Officer to the Government of Karnataka for Trifurcating Bangalore University. He submitted the report on 26 March 2015 for restructuring Bangalore University into Bangalore University, Bengaluru City University and Bengaluru North University . The first vice chancellor (VC) of the university was S. Japhet. Narasimha Murthy replaced him as an interim VC in November 2020 until the appointment of Lingaraja Gandhi in April 2021.

== Constituent Colleges ==
- Government Arts College Bangalore
- Ramnarayan Chellaram College of Commerce and Management, Bangalore

== Affiliated Colleges ==
For the academic year 2019–20 the university had 204 affiliated colleges, 24 education colleges, and 9 autonomous colleges. Notable affiliated colleges include:

- St. Joseph's College of Commerce
- Baldwin Methodist College
- College of Fine Arts, Bengaluru
- Government Science College, Bangalore
- Jyoti Nivas College
- Maharani Lakshmi Ammanni College For Women
- St Francis College, Koramangala, Bangalore
- The Regency College of Education, Bangalore
- K.L.E. Society's S. Nijalingappa College
- MES College of Arts, Science and Commerce, Malleswaram, Bengaluru
