= List of engineering colleges affiliated to Visvesvaraya Technological University =

There are 219 engineering colleges affiliated to Visvesvaraya Technological University (VTU), which is in Belgaum in the state of Karnataka, India. This list is categorised into two parts, autonomous colleges and non-autonomous colleges. Autonomous colleges are bestowed academic independence allowing them to form their own syllabus and conduct their own examinations.

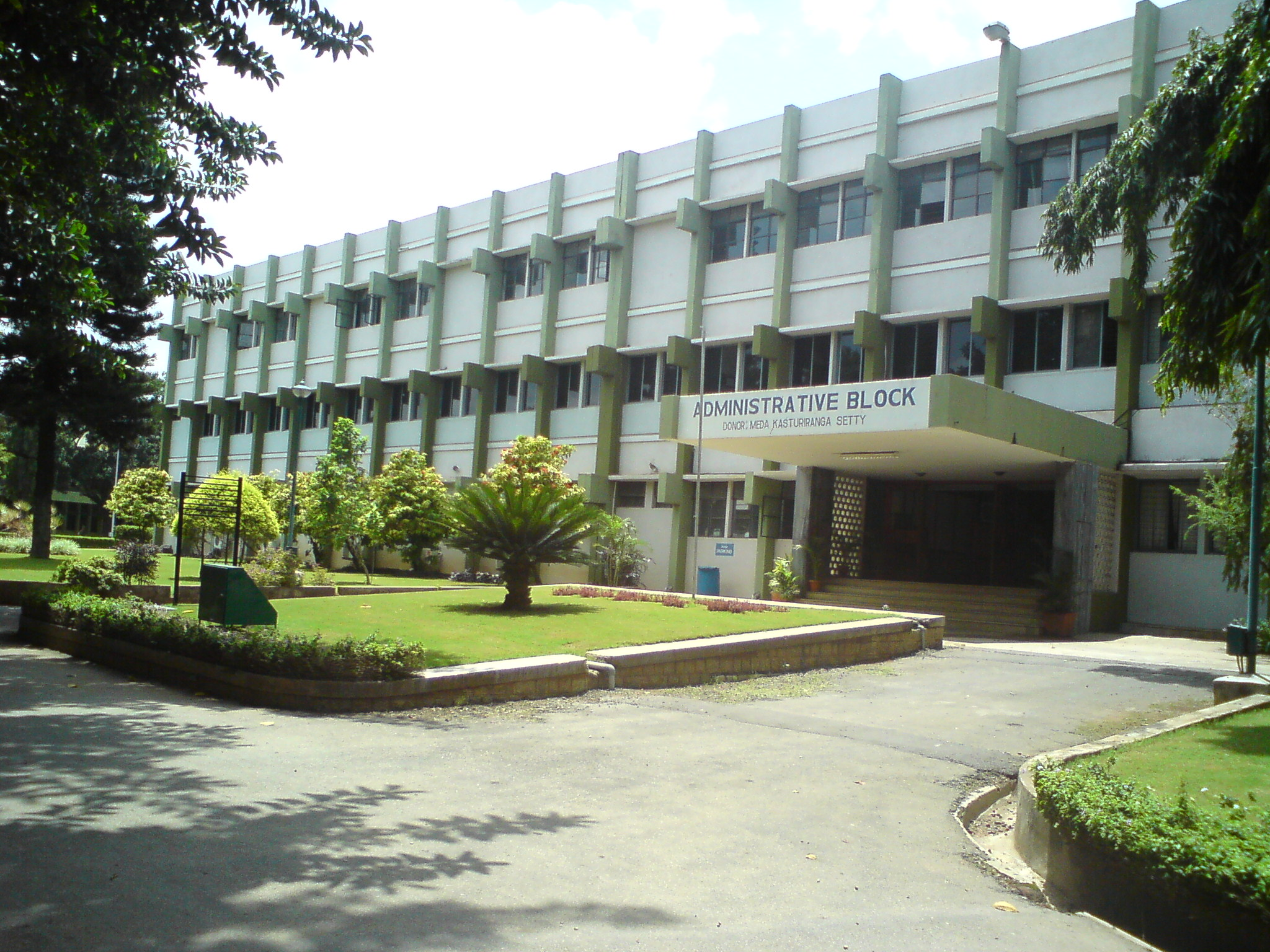
A block in R.V. College of Engineering

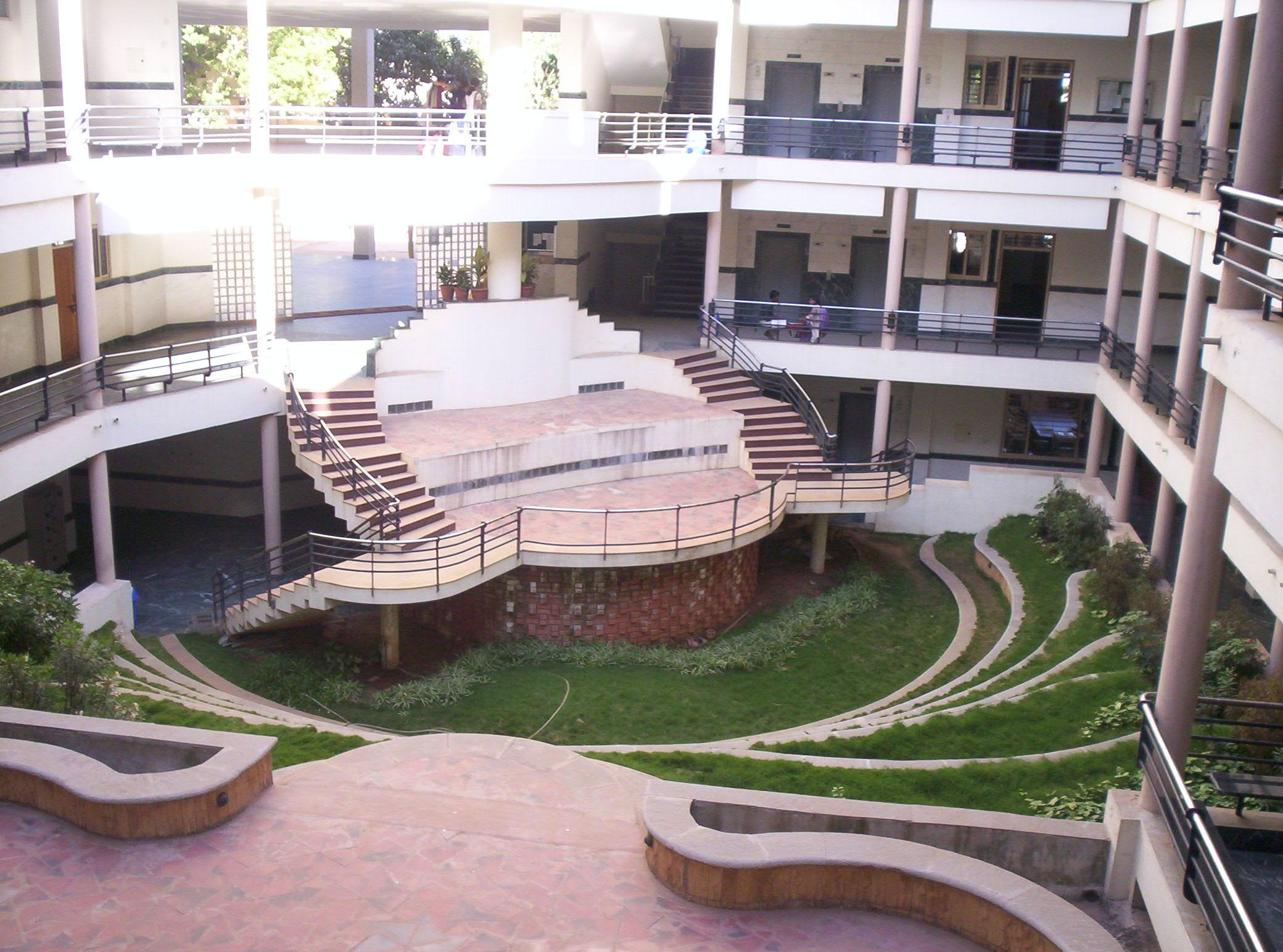
MSRIT Electrical Block

A college may be classified as government run, private unaided, or private aided. A government college receives full funding from the Government of Karnataka, while a private unaided college receives no funding from the government. In a private aided college, one or more of its courses receives partial funding from the government. An autonomous college enjoys academic independence which gives it the freedom to revise the syllabus with time and follow a schedule which is more suitable for the set curriculum. Almost all engineering colleges in Karnataka are affiliated to VTU, notable exceptions being University Visvesvaraya College of Engineering, National Institute of Technology Karnataka, PES University.Manipal Institute of Technology, JSS Science and Technology University and NITTE (Deemed to be University).

== Table legend ==
Name in table	Department
BT	Biotechnology
ME	Mechanical Engineering
CH	Chemical Engineering
CS	Computer Science and Engineering
EC	Electronics and Communication Engineering
EE	Electrical and Electronics Engineering
IM	Industrial Engineering and Management
EIE	Electronics Engineering
IS	Information Science and Engineering
CE	Civil Engineering
CH	Chemical Engineering
AI	Artificial Intelligence, Machine Learning, Data Science
TC	Telecommunication Engineering
Other	Any other courses offered by the college

The list is further categorised into private, government aided, and government colleges.

== Government Colleges ==
College name	EC	CS	ME	EE	CE	IT	IEM	TE	IS	BT	AI	Other
Government Engineering College, Hoovina Hadagali, Bellary district	Yes	Yes	Yes	No	Yes	No	No	No	No	No	No	No
Government Engineering College, Chamarajnagar	Yes	Yes	Yes	No	Yes	No	No	No	No	No	No	No
Government Engineering College, Hassan	Yes	Yes	Yes	No	Yes	No	No	No	No	No	No	No
Government Engineering College, Haveri	Yes	Yes	Yes	No	Yes	No	No	No	No	No	No	No
Government Engineering College, Karwar	Yes	Yes	Yes	No	Yes	No	No	No	No	No	No	No
Government Engineering College, Krishnarajpet	Yes	Yes	Yes	No	Yes	No	No	No	No	No	No	No
Government Engineering College, Kushalnagar	Yes	Yes	Yes	No	Yes	No	No	No	No	No	No	No
Government Engineering College, Ramanagaram	Yes	Yes	Yes	No	Yes	No	No	No	No	No	No	No
Government Engineering College, Raichur	Yes	Yes	Yes	No	Yes	No	No	No	No	No	No	No
University B.D.T College of Engineering, Davangere	Yes	Yes	Yes	Yes	Yes	No	No	No	No	No	No	E&I, IP, M.Tech in PEST, DE, TPE
Government Engineering College, Challakere	No	No	No	No	No	No	No	No	No	No	Yes	AU

== Private colleges ==
College name	EC	CS	ME	EE	CE	IT	IEM	TE	IS	BT	AI	Other
Bangalore Institute of Technology, Bangalore	Yes	Yes	Yes	Yes	Yes	Yes	Yes	Yes	Yes	No	No	MTECH and MBA
Dayananda Sagar Academy of Technology and Management, Bangalore	Yes	Yes	Yes	Yes	Yes	Yes	No	No	Yes	No	No	BArch and MBA
Sir M. Viveswaraya Institute of Technology, Bangalore	Yes	Yes	Yes	Yes	Yes	No	Yes	Yes	Yes	Yes	No	No
J.S.S. Academy of Technical Education, Bangalore	Yes	Yes	Yes	No	Yes	Yes	No	No	Yes	No	No	No
C.M.R. Institute of Technology, Bangalore	Yes	Yes	Yes	Yes	Yes	No	No	Yes	Yes	No	No	No
Acharya Institute of Technology, Bangalore	Yes	Yes	Yes	Yes	Yes	No	No	No	Yes	Yes	No	Mechatronics Engineering, Aeronautical Engineering, Automobile Engineering, Construction Technology
M.V. Jayaram College of Engineering, Bangalore	Yes	Yes	Yes	Yes	Yes	No	Yes	Yes	Yes	Yes	No	Medical Electronics, Aeronautical Engineering, Chemical Engineering
SJB Institute of Technology, Bangalore	Yes	Yes	Yes	Yes	Yes	No	No	No	Yes	No	No	M.Tech in Computer Science & Engg., M.Tech in Computer Engineering, M.Tech in Computer Networks & Engineering, M.Tech in VLSI design & ES, M.Tech in Digital Communication & Networking, M.Tech in Digital Electronics, M.Tech in Machine Design, Master of Business Administration
R.N.S. Institute of Technology, Bangalore	Yes	Yes	No	Yes	No	Yes	No	No	Yes	No	No	No
Sri Sairam College of Engineering, Bangalore	Yes	Yes	Yes	Yes	No	No	No	No	No	No	No	No
Sri Venkateshwara College of Engineering, Bangalore	Yes	Yes	Yes	Yes	Yes	No	No	No	Yes	No	No	No
The Oxford College of Engineering, Bangalore	Yes	Yes	Yes	Yes	Yes	No	No	No	Yes	Yes	No	No
Vivekananda Institute of Technology, Bangalore	Yes	Yes	No	No	No	No	No	Yes	Yes	No	No	No
B.T.L. Institute of Technology and Management, Bangalore	Yes	Yes	Yes	No	No	No	No	No	Yes	No	No	No
Sri Revana Siddeshwara Institute of Technology, Bangalore	Yes	Yes	Yes	No	Yes	No	No	No	No	No	No	Thermal Power Engineering
B.N.M. Institute of Technology, Bangalore	Yes	Yes	Yes	Yes	No	No	No	Yes	Yes	No	No	No
Sapthagiri College of Engineering, Bangalore	Yes	Yes	Yes	Yes	No	No	No	No	Yes	Yes	No	No
Sai Vidya Institute of Technology, Bangalore	Yes	Yes	Yes	Yes	Yes	No	No	No	Yes	No	No	No
Reva Institute of Technology and Management, Bangalore	Yes	Yes	Yes	Yes	Yes	No	No	No	Yes	No	No	No
City Engineering College, Bangalore	Yes	Yes	Yes	No	Yes	No	No	No	Yes	No	No	No
Kammavari Sangha Institute of Technology, Bangalore	Yes	Yes	Yes	No	No	No	No	Yes	No	No	No	No
HKBK College of Engineering, Bangalore	Yes	Yes	Yes	No	Yes	No	No	No	Yes	No	No	No
Bheemanna Khandre Institute of Technology, Bhalki	Yes	Yes	Yes	No	Yes	No	No	No	No	No	No	BE in Chemical Engineering, M.Tech in Computer Science & Engineering, M.Tech in Digital Communication and Networking, M.Tech in Water Resource Management, M.Tech in Geo Technology, Master of Computer Applications (MCA), PhD in Mathematics, PhD in Electronics and Communication Engineering, PhD in Chemistry, PhD in Physics
Adichunchanagiri Institute of Technology, Chikmagalur	Yes	Yes	Yes	Yes	Yes	No	No	No	Yes	No	No	No
Shri pillappa college of engineering Bangalore	Yes	Yes	Yes	Yes	Yes	Yes	No	No	Yes	No	No	No
Vemana Institute of Technology, Bangalore	Yes	Yes	Yes	No	No	No	No	Yes	Yes	No	No	No
AMC Institutions, Bangalore	Yes	Yes	Yes	Yes	No	No	No	No	Yes	No	No	No
East Point College of Engineering and Technology, Bangalore	Yes	Yes	Yes	Yes	Yes	No	No	No	Yes	No	No	No
Atria Institute of Technology, Bangalore	Yes	Yes	Yes	No	Yes	No	No	Yes	Yes	No	No	No
K.N.S. Institute of Technology, Bangalore	Yes	Yes	No	No	No	Yes	No	No	Yes	No	No	No
Don Bosco Institute of Technology, Bangalore	Yes	Yes	Yes	Yes	Yes	No	No	Yes	Yes	No	No	No
Global Academy of Technology, Bangalore	Yes	Yes	Yes	Yes	Yes	No	No	No	Yes	No	Yes	BE in Aeronautical Engineering, Mtech programs in Structutal Engineering, Computer Science Engineering, Thermal Engineering, Digital Electronics and Communication, MBA programs, Msc Engineering programs
East West Institute of Technology, Bangalore	Yes	Yes	Yes	No	Yes	No	No	No	Yes	No	No	No
Yellamma Dasappa Institute of Technology, Bangalore	Yes	Yes	No	No	No	No	No	No	Yes	No	No	No
Sri Krishna Institute of Technology, Bangalore	Yes	Yes	Yes	Yes	Yes	No	No	No	Yes	No	No	No
Sambhram Institute of Technology, Bangalore	Yes	Yes	Yes	No	Yes	No	No	No	Yes	No	No	No
Sri Jagadguru Chandrasekaranathaswamiji Institute of Technology, Chickballapur	Yes	Yes	Yes	Yes	Yes	No	No	No	Yes	No	No	No
Alpha College of Engineering, Bangalore	Yes	Yes	Yes	No	No	No	No	No	Yes	No	No	No
A.P.S. College of Engineering, Bangalore	Yes	Yes	Yes	No	Yes	No	No	Yes	Yes	No	No	No
Cambridge Institute of Technology, Bangalore	Yes	Yes	Yes	Yes	No	No	No	No	Yes	No	No	No
Jnanavikasa Institute of Technology, Bangalore	Yes	Yes	No	No	No	No	No	No	Yes	No	No	No
Amrutha Institute of Engineering and Management, Bangalore	Yes	Yes	No	Yes	No	No	No	No	Yes	No	No	No
East Point College of Engineering for Women, Bangalore	Yes	Yes	No	No	No	No	No	No	Yes	No	No	No
Brindavan College of Engineering, Bangalore	Yes	Yes	Yes	No	Yes	No	No	No	Yes	No	No	No
R.R. Institute of Technology, Bangalore	Yes	Yes	No	Yes	No	No	No	No	Yes	No	No	No
Islamia Institute of Technology, Bangalore	Yes	Yes	Yes	Yes	Yes	No	No	No	No	No	No	No
ADARSHA Institute of Technology, Bangalore	Yes	Yes	Yes	No	No	No	No	No	No	No	No	No
Bangalore College of Engineering and Technology, Bangalore	Yes	Yes	Yes	Yes	Yes	No	No	No	Yes	No	No	No
Dr. Sri Sri Sri Shivakumara Mahaswamiji College of Engineering, Bangalore	Yes	Yes	Yes	No	Yes	No	No	No	Yes	No	No	No
P.N.S. Women's Institute of Technology, Bangalore	Yes	Yes	No	Yes	No	No	No	No	Yes	No	No	No
A.C.S. College of Engineering, Bangalore	Yes	Yes	Yes	No	Yes	No	No	No	No	No	No	No
Vijaya Vittala Institute of Technology, Bangalore	Yes	Yes	Yes	No	Yes	No	No	No	No	No	No	No
Gopalan College of Engineering and Management, Bangalore	Yes	Yes	Yes	No	Yes	No	No	No	No	No	No	Aeronautical Engineering Architecture
S.C.T. Institute of Technology, Bangalore	Yes	Yes	Yes	Yes	No	No	No	No	Yes	No	No	Aeronautical Engineering
Rajiv Gandhi Institute of Technology, Bangalore	Yes	Yes	Yes	Yes	Yes	No	No	No	No	No	No	Bio-Medical Engineering, M.Tech in Computer Science & Engineering, M.Tech in Nano Technology, M.Tech in Material Science & Tech, M.Tech in Material Science & Tech, M.Tech in Electrical Energy Systems, Master of Business Administration, PhD in Computer Science Engineering, PhD in Electronics and Communication Engineering, PhD in Mechanical Engineering, PhD in Bio Medical Engineering,
M.S. Engineering College, Bangalore	Yes	Yes	Yes	Yes	No	No	No	No	Yes	No	No	No
Basava Academy of Engineering, Bangalore												
Nadgir Institute of Engineering and Technology, Bangalore												
Impact College of Engineering and Applied Sciences, Bangalore	Yes	Yes	Yes	Yes	Yes	No	No	No	No	No	No	No
GSS Institute of Technology, Bangalore	Yes	Yes	Yes	Yes	Yes	No	No	No	No	No	No	No
RajaRajeswari College of Engineering, Bangalore	Yes	Yes	Yes	Yes	Yes	No	No	No	Yes	No	No	No
T John Institute of Technology, Bangalore	Yes	Yes	Yes	No	No	No	No	Yes	Yes	No	No	No
Auden Technology and Management Academy, Bangalore	Yes	Yes	No	Yes	No	No	No	No	Yes	No	No	No
S.E.A. College of Engineering and Technology, Bangalore	Yes	Yes	Yes	No	Yes	No	No	No	Yes	No	No	No
K.L.E. Institute of Technology, Hubballi	Yes	Yes	Yes	Yes	Yes	No	No	No	Yes	No	No	Yes
A.G.M. Rural Engineering College, Hubli	Yes	Yes	Yes	Yes	No	No	No	No	No	No	No	No
SRI SIDHARTHA SCHOOL OF ENGINEERING (SSSE)Tumkur	Yes	Yes	Yes	Yes	No	No	No	No	No	No	No	No
Shridevi Institute of Engineering and Technology, Tumkur	Yes	Yes	Yes	Yes	No	No	No	No	Yes	Yes	No	No
Akshaya Institute of Technology, Tumkur	Yes	Yes	Yes	No	Yes	No	No	No	No	No	No	No
Ghousia College of Engineering, Ramnagar	Yes	Yes	Yes	Yes	Yes	No	No	No	Yes	No	No	No
S.J.C. Institute of Technology, Chickballapur	Yes	Yes	Yes	Yes	Yes	No	No	Yes	Yes	No	No	Yes
Sha-shib College of Engineering, Chikballapur	Yes	Yes	Yes	No	Yes	No	No	No	No	No	No	No
R.L. Jalappa Institute of Technology, Doddballapur	Yes	Yes	Yes	No	No	No	No	No	Yes	No	No	No
Dr. T. Thimmaiah Institute of Technology, Kolar Gold Fields	Yes	Yes	Yes	Yes	No	No	No	No	Yes	No	No	Mining Engineering
C. Byre Gowda Institute of Technology, Kolar	Yes	Yes	Yes	No	Yes	No	No	No	No	No	No	No
Kalpatharu Institute of Technology, Tiptur	Yes	Yes	Yes	No	No	No	No	Yes	Yes	No	No	No
Sri Basaveshwara Institute of Technology, Tiptur												
B.G.S. Institute of Technology, Mandya	Yes	Yes	No	Yes	No	No	No	No	Yes	No	No	No
Tontadarya College of Engineering, Gadag	Yes	Yes	Yes	No	No	No	No	No	Yes	No	No	No
Smt. Kamala and Sri. Venkappa Magadi College of Engineering and Technology, Gadag	Yes	Yes	Yes	Yes	Yes	No	No	No	Yes	No	No	No
Maratha Mandal Engineering College, Belgaum	Yes	Yes	Yes	No	No	No	No	No	No	No	No	No
K.L.E. Society College of Engineering and Technology, Belgaum	Yes	Yes	Yes	Yes	Yes	No	No	Yes	No	Yes	No	Bio-Medical Engineering, Chemical Engineering
S.G. Balekundri Institute of Technology, Belgaum	Yes	Yes	Yes	Yes	Yes	No	No	No	No	No	No	No
Shaikh College of Engineering and Technology, Belgaum	Yes	Yes	Yes	No	Yes	No	No	No	No	No	No	No
Angadi Institute of Technology and Management, Belgaum	Yes	Yes	No	Yes	Yes	No	No	No	No	No	No	No
Jain College of Engineering, Belgaum	Yes	Yes	Yes	Yes	Yes	No	No	No	No	No	No	No
KLE's College of Engineering and Technology, Chikkodi	Yes	Yes	No	No	No	No	No	No	Yes	No	No	No
Anuvartik Mirji Bharatesh Institute of Technology, Belgaum	Yes	Yes	No	No	No	No	No	No	No	No	Yes	MCA
R.T.E. Society Rural Engineering College, Hulkoti	Yes	Yes	Yes	No	Yes	No	No	No	No	No	No	Textile Engineering, Automobile Engineering, Chemical Engineering
Sri Taralabalu Jagadguru Institute of Technology, Ranebennur	Yes	Yes	Yes	Yes	Yes	No	No	No	Yes	No	No	No
Anjuman Institute of Technology and Management, Bhatkal	Yes	Yes	Yes	Yes	Yes	No	No	No	Yes	No	No	No
B.L.D.E.A's V.P. Dr. P.G. Halakatti College of Engineering and Technology, Bijapur	Yes	Yes	Yes	Yes	Yes	No	No	No	Yes	No	No	Industrial production, Automobile Engineering
SECAB Institute of Engineering & Technology, Bijapur	Yes	Yes	Yes	Yes	Yes	No	No	No	Yes	No	No	No
Hirasugar Institute of Technology, Nidasoshi	Yes	Yes	Yes	Yes	No	No	No	No	No	No	No	No
Khaja Banda Nawaz College of Engineering, Gulbarga	Yes	Yes	Yes	No	Yes	Yes	No	No	Yes	No	No	Biomedical Engineering, Aeronautical Engineering
K.C.T. Engineering College, Gulbarga	Yes	Yes	Yes	No	No	No	No	No	No	No	No	No
Appa Institute of Engineering and Technology, Gulbarga	Yes	Yes	No	No	No	No	No	No	Yes	No	No	No
Godutai Engineering College for Women, Gulbarga	Yes	Yes	No	Yes	No	No	No	No	Yes	No	No	No
Guru Nanak Dev Engineering College, Bidar	Yes	Yes	Yes	Yes	Yes	No	No	No	Yes	No	No	Automobile Engineering
Rao Bahadur Y. Mahabaleswarappa Engineering College, Bellary	Yes	Yes	Yes	Yes	Yes	Yes	No	No	Yes	No	No	Industrial Production
Ballari Institute of Technology and Management, Bellary	Yes	Yes	Yes	Yes	No	No	No	No	Yes	No	No	No
H.K.E's S.L.N. College of Engineering, Raichur	Yes	Yes	Yes	No	Yes	No	No	No	Yes	No	No	Textile Engineering
Navodaya Institute of Technology, Raichur	Yes	Yes	Yes	Yes	Yes	No	No	No	Yes	No	No	No
KVG College of Engineering, Sullia	Yes	Yes	Yes	Yes	Yes	No	No	No	Yes	No	No	No
St. Joseph Engineering College, Mangalore	Yes	Yes	Yes	Yes	No	No	No	No	Yes	No	No	No
P A College of Engineering, Mangalore	Yes	Yes	Yes	No	No	No	No	Yes	Yes	Yes	No	No
Srinivas Institute of Technology, Mangalore	Yes	Yes	Yes	No	No	No	No	No	Yes	No	No	No
Shreedevi Institute of Technology, Mangalore	Yes	Yes	Yes	No	No	No	No	No	Yes	No	No	No
Karavali Institute of Technology, Mangalore	Yes	Yes	Yes	Yes	Yes	No	No	No	Yes	No	No	No
Sahyadri Institute of Technology and Management, Mangalore	Yes	Yes	Yes	No	Yes	No	No	No	Yes	No	No	No
Dr. M.V. Shetty Institute of Technology, Mangalore	Yes	Yes	Yes	Yes	No	No	No	No	Yes	No	No	No
Bearys Institute of Technology, Mangalore	Yes	Yes	Yes	No	Yes	No	No	No	Yes	No	No	No
A. Shama Rao Foundation, Srinivas School of Engineering, Mangalore	Yes	Yes	Yes	No	Yes	No	No	No	No	No	No	No
Mangalore Marine College and Technology, Mangalore	No	No	Yes	No	Yes	No	No	No	Yes	No	No	First Marine College in Karnataka
S.D.M. Institute of Technology, Ujire	Yes	Yes	No	Yes	No	No	No	No	Yes	No	No	No
Alva's Institute of Engineering and Technology, Moodabidri	Yes	Yes	Yes	No	Yes	No	No	No	Yes	No	No	M.Tech and MBA
Mangalore Institute of Technology and Engineering, Moodabidri	Yes	Yes	Yes	No	No	No	No	No	Yes	No	No	Aeronautical Engineering
Vivekananda College of Engineering Technology, Puttur	Yes	Yes	Yes	No	No	No	No	No	Yes	No	No	No
Canara Engineering College, Bantwal	Yes	Yes	Yes	Yes	No	No	No	No	Yes	No	No	No
Moodlakatte Institute of Technology, Kundapura	Yes	Yes	Yes	Yes	Yes	No	No	No	No	No	No	No
K.L.S. Viswanathrao Deshpande Rural Institute of Technology, Haliyal	Yes	Yes	Yes	Yes	Yes	No	No	No	Yes	No	No	No
Bapuji Institute of Engineering & Technology, Davanagere	Yes	Yes	Yes	Yes	Yes	Yes	No	No	Yes	Yes	No	Industrial Production, Textile Engineering, Bio-Medical Engineering, Chemical Engineering
G M Institute of Technology, Davanagere	Yes	Yes	Yes	No	Yes	No	No	No	Yes	Yes	No	No
Jawaharlal Nehru National College of Engineering, Shimoga	Yes	Yes	Yes	Yes	Yes	No	No	Yes	Yes	No	No	No
P.E.S. Institute of Technology and Management, Shimoga	Yes	Yes	No	Yes	No	No	No	No	Yes	No	No	No
S.J.M. Institute of Technology, Chitradurga	Yes	Yes	Yes	Yes	Yes	No	No	No	Yes	No	No	Automobile Engineering, Industrial Production
Vidya Vardhaka College of Engineering, Mysore	Yes	Yes	Yes	Yes	No	No	No	No	Yes	No	No	Environment Engineering
Vidya Vikas Institute of Engineering and Technology, Mysore	Yes	Yes	Yes	Yes	Yes	No	No	No	Yes	No	No	No
GSSS Institute of Engineering & Technology for Women, Mysore	Yes	Yes	No	Yes	No	Yes	No	Yes	Yes	No	No	No
Maharaja Institute of Technology Mysore	Yes	Yes	Yes	No	Yes	No	No	No	Yes	No	No	No
N.I.E. Institute of Technology, Mysore	Yes	Yes	No	Yes	No	No	No	No	Yes	No	No	No
Proudadevaraya Institute of Technology, Hospet	Yes	Yes	Yes	No	No	Yes	No	No	Yes	No	No	No
Basavakalyana Engineering College, Basavakalyana	Yes	Yes	Yes	No	Yes	No	No	No	Yes	No	No	No
Coorg Institute of Technology, Ponnampet	Yes	Yes	No	No	No	No	No	Yes	Yes	No	No	No
Channabasaveshwara Institute of Technology, Gubbi	Yes	Yes	No	Yes	No	No	No	No	Yes	No	No	No
Rajeev Institute of Technology, Hassan	Yes	Yes	Yes	Yes	No	No	No	No	Yes	No	No	No
Yagachi Institute of Technology, Hassan	Yes	Yes	Yes	No	Yes	No	No	No	No	No	No	No
Bahubali College of Engineering, Shravanabelagola	Yes	Yes	Yes	Yes	Yes	No	No	Yes	Yes	No	No	No
Sampoorna Group of Institutions, Channapatna	Yes	Yes	Yes	Yes	Yes	No	No	No	No	No	No	No
Veerappa Nisty Engineering College, Yadgir	Yes	Yes	Yes	Yes	Yes	No	No	No	No	No	No	No
Ekalavya Institute of Technology, Chamarajnagar	Yes	Yes	Yes	No	Yes	No	No	No	No	No	No	No
Sri Vidya Vinayaka Institute of Technology, Bangalore	Yes	Yes	Yes	No	Yes	No	No	No	No	No	No	No
ATME College of Engineering, Mysuru	Yes	Yes	Yes	Yes	Yes	No	No	No	No	No	No	No

== Autonomous colleges ==
Autonomy, as granted by the University Grants Commission, in concurrence with the Government of Karnataka, has been conferred upon selected colleges, which grants upon them, certain special privileges.

Autonomous colleges can frame their own schemes of study, curricula and evaluation, without need of the approval of the university. These colleges also have the freedom to conduct add on courses and supplementary semesters for students who may be in need of it. They also have the freedom to avail grants from funding agencies. All of these privileges are not granted to non-autonomous colleges.

Autonomy is granted in order to obtain better placements for students, to have better college-industry interaction, and also to enable colleges to continuously update and modernize the curriculum.

College name	EC	CS	ME	EE	CE	CH	IT	IEM	TE	IS	BT	AI	Other
Basaveshwar College of Engineering, Bagalkot	Yes	Yes	Yes	Yes	Yes	No	Yes	No	No	Yes	Yes	No	Yes
B. M. S. College of Engineering, Bangalore	Yes	Yes	Yes	Yes	Yes	Yes	Yes	Yes	Yes	Yes	Yes	No	Yes
B. M. S. Institute of Technology, Bangalore	Yes	Yes	Yes	Yes	Yes	No	No	No	No	Yes	No	No	Yes
Dr. Ambedkar Institute of Technology, Bangalore	Yes	Yes	Yes	Yes	Yes	No	Yes	Yes	Yes	Yes	No	No	Medical Electronics
Dayananda Sagar College of Engineering, Bangalore	Yes	Yes	Yes	Yes	Yes	Yes	Yes	Yes	Yes	Yes	Yes	No	Yes
K. L. S. Gogte Institute of Technology, Belgaum	Yes	Yes	Yes	Yes	Yes	Yes	Yes	No	No	Yes	Yes	No	Aeronautical Engineering
M. S. Ramaiah Institute of Technology, Bangalore	Yes	Yes	Yes	Yes	Yes	Yes	Yes	Yes	Yes	Yes	Yes	Yes	Medical Electronics
Malnad College of Engineering, Hassan	Yes	Yes	Yes	Yes	Yes	No	Yes	No	No	Yes	No	No	Automobile Engineering
Nagarjuna College of Engineering and Technology, Bengaluru	Yes	Yes	Yes	Yes	Yes	Yes	Yes	Yes	Yes	Yes	Yes	No	Yes
New Horizon College of Engineering, Bangalore	Yes	Yes	Yes	Yes	Yes	No	No	No	No	Yes	Yes	No	Automobile Engineering
Sahyadri College of Engineering And Management, Mangalore	Yes	Yes	Yes	No	No	No	Yes	No	No	Yes	No	No	Yes
National Institute of Engineering, Mysore	Yes	Yes	Yes	Yes	Yes	No	No	Yes	No	Yes	No	No	No
Nitte Meenakshi Institute of Technology, Bangalore	Yes	Yes	Yes	Yes	Yes	No	No	No	No	Yes	No	No	Aeronautical engineering
P. D. A. College of Engineering, Kalaburagi	Yes	Yes	Yes	Yes	Yes	Yes	Yes	Yes	No	Yes	No	No	Automobile Engineering, Cement and Ceramic
P. E. S. College of Engineering, Mandya	Yes	Yes	Yes	Yes	Yes	No	No	No	No	Yes	No	No	Automobile Engineering
R. V. College of Engineering, Bangalore	Yes	Yes	Yes	Yes	Yes	Yes	Yes	Yes	Yes	Yes	Yes	Yes	Aerospace engineering
R. V. Institute of Technology and Management, Bangalore	Yes	Yes	Yes	Yes	Yes	Yes	No	No	No	Yes	No	No	No
Siddaganga Institute of Technology, Tumkur	Yes	Yes	Yes	Yes	Yes	Yes	Yes	Yes	Yes	Yes	Yes	No	No
Banglore Institute of Technology	Yes	Yes	Yes	Yes	Yes	Yes	Yes	Yes	Yes	Yes	Yes	No	Yes
Sri Siddhartha Institute of Technology, Tumkur	Yes	Yes	Yes	Yes	Yes	No	Yes	Yes	Yes	Yes	No	No	Medical Electronics
Global Academy of Technology, Bangalore	Yes	Yes	Yes	Yes	Yes	No	No	No	No	Yes	No	No	Yes
Dr. Ambedkar Institute of Technology, Bangalore	Yes	Yes	Yes	Yes	Yes	No	Yes	Yes	Yes	Yes	No	No	Aeronautical Engineering, Medical Electronics
G. M. Institute of Technology, Davanagere	Yes	Yes	Yes	Yes	Yes	No	Yes	No	No	Yes	Yes	Yes	Cybersecurity, CS&BS
