= RNS Institute of Technology =

Engineering college in Bangalore, India

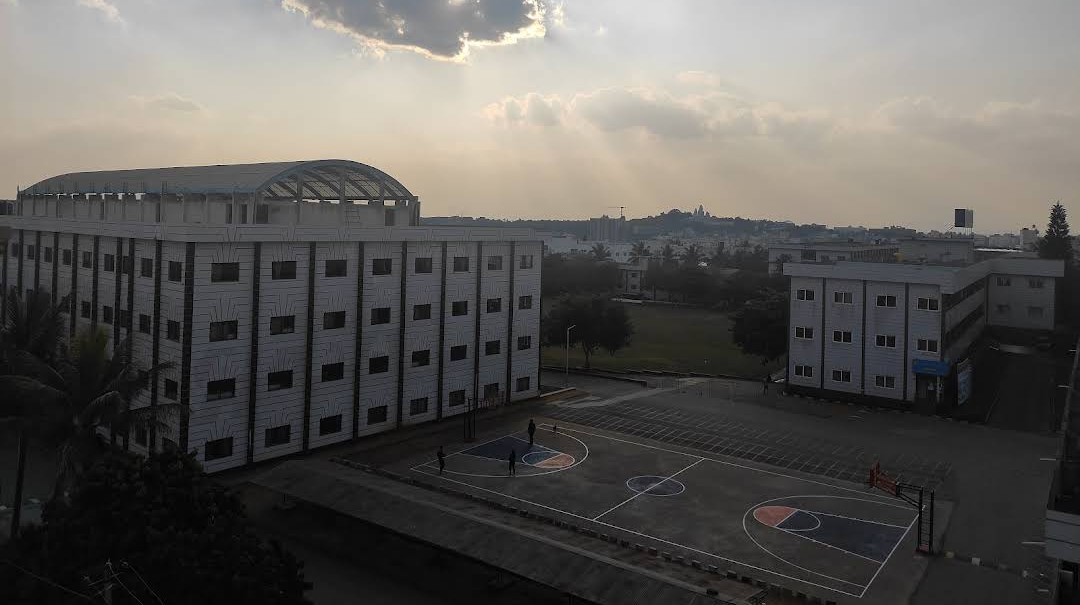
- Aerial view of the RNSIT Campus
- Type: Private
- Established: 2001
- Affiliations: VTU
- Principal: Dr. Ramesh Babu H S
- Director: M K Venkatesha
- Location: Bangalore, Karnataka, India; 12°54′4″N 77°31′5″E
- Campus: Urban, located on Uttarahalli-Kengeri Road.
- Website: rnsit.ac.in

RNS Institute of Technology is a private engineering college and is located in Bangalore, India. The college is autonomous and is affiliated to Visvesvaraya Technological University. It is approved by AICTE, accredited by NBA and NAAC with 'A+' grade, i.e., a score of 3.1/7 (3.3 or above - A++). Rama Nagappa Shetty Institute of Technology (RNSIT) established in the year 2001, is the brain-child of the Group Chairman, Dr. R. N. Shetty.

Founded by a great visionary Dr. R N Shetty, a renowned name in the industries viz construction, manufacturing, hotel, automobile, power & IT services, and education, RNSIT has been scripting history in the field of technical education. Right from its inception in the year 2001, the institution is showing growth with respect to academics, placements, sports and cultural activities; 9 UG engineering branches, 4 PG courses and 9 R&D centres.

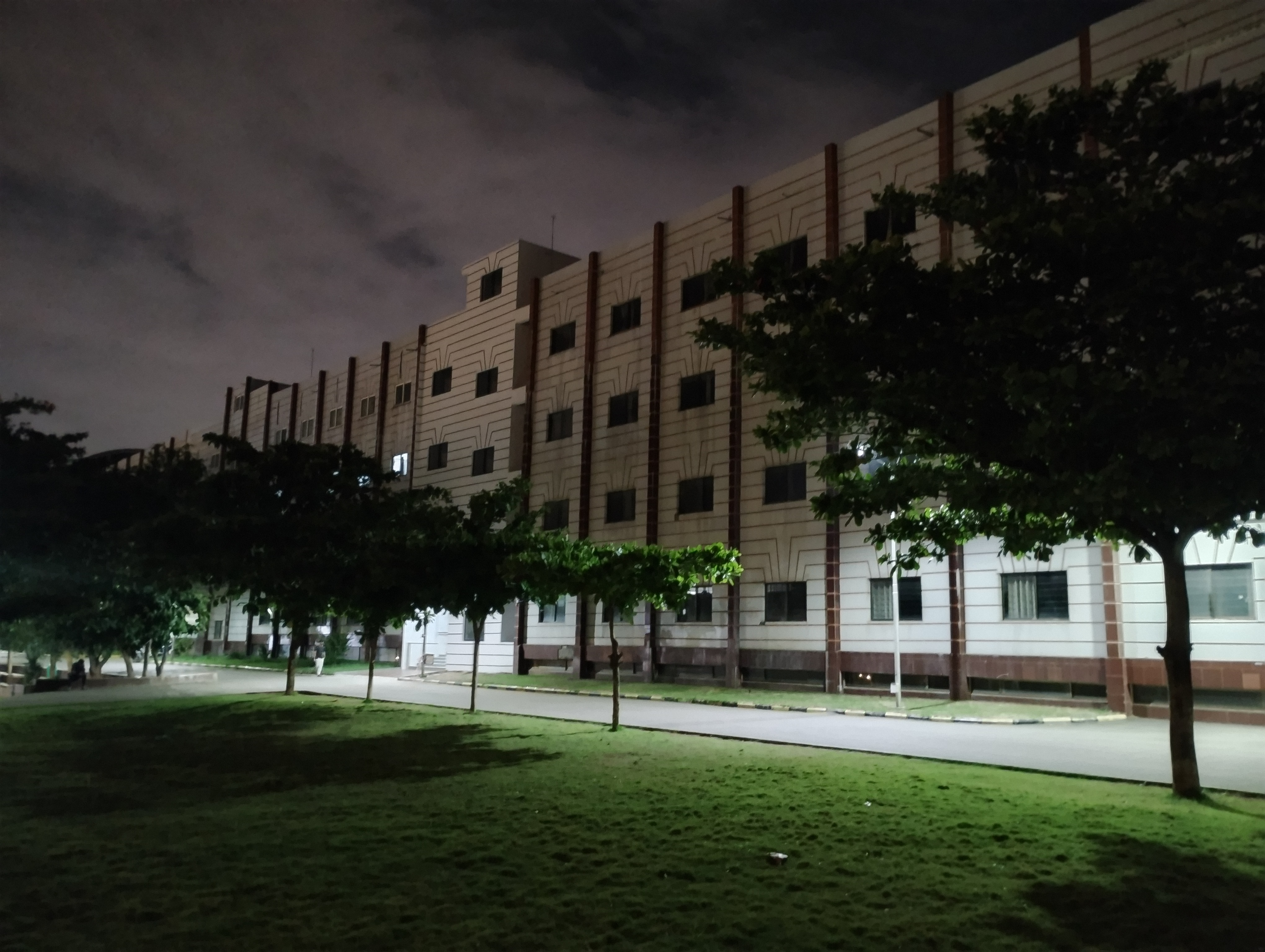
Campus at night

== Affiliation and accreditation ==
All the courses offered by RNSIT are affiliated to Visvesvaraya Technological University (VTU), Belagavi & approved by All India Council for Technical Education (AICTE).

Computer Science Engineering (CSE), Information Science Engineering (ISE), Electronics and Communications Engineering (ECE), Electrical and Electronics Engineering (EEE) and Electrical and Instrumentation Engineering (EIE) programs offered by RNSIT are accredited by National Board of Accreditation (NBA) and the College is accredited by the National Assessment and Accreditation Council (NAAC).

Like all higher education institutes in India, RNSIT is recognised by the University Grants Commission (UGC). RNSIT is also approved by the All India Council for Technical Education (AICTE) and some courses are accredited by the National Board of Accreditation (NBA). It is also accredited by the National Assessment and Accreditation Council (NAAC) with a A+ Grade.

== See also ==
- List of colleges affiliated to Visvesvaraya Technological University
