= B.N.M. Institute of Technology =

Engineering college in Bangalore, India

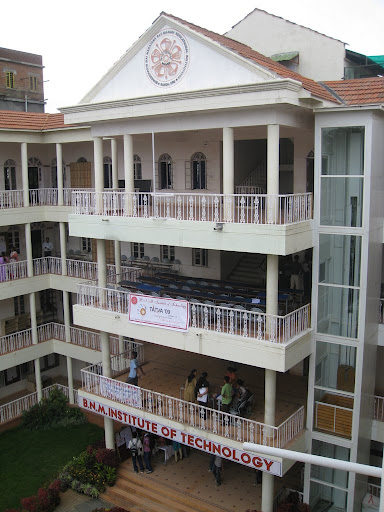
BNMIT Main Building

B.N.M. Institute of Technology (also Bhageerathi Bai Narayana Rao Maanay Institute of Technology) is an autonomous private technical co-educational engineering education institution located in Bangalore, Karnataka, India. It was established in 2001 and is affiliated to the Visvesvaraya Technological University, Belgaum.

== About ==
BNMEI – B.N.M. Educational Institutions were established by the trust Bhageerathi Bai Narayana Rao Maanay Charities in 1972. The Managing Trustee N. Raghunath Rao Maanay - along with Sunanda P Jadhav, the founder, Secretary and Principal, founded the institution.
