= KLE Institute of Technology =

Engineering institute in Hubli, India

K.L.E Society's KLE Institute of Technology (KLEIT)
- Motto: Engineering Education for Competitive World
- Type: Visweswaraiah Technological University
- Established: 2008
- President: Dr. Prabhakar B.Kore
- Principal: Dr.Manu T.M.
- Undergraduates: 1920
- Postgraduates: 219
- Location: Hubli, Karnataka, India; 15.3518705°N 75.0116065°E
- Campus: 15 acres (61,000 m^{2}), Opposite Airport, Gokul, Hubli
- Approvals: AICTE
- Website: www.kleit.ac.in/

The K.L.E Society's KLE Institute of Technology (KLEIT) is an engineering college in Hubli, India. Established in 2008, it is one of the institutes under the banner of Karnatak Lingayat Education Society(KLE). KLEIT is approved by the AICTE and recognized by University Grant Commission of India. KLEIT is affiliated to Visvesvaraya Technological University, Belgaum for its BE, MCA and M.Tech courses.

== Academics ==
The institute has nine academic departments with the following degrees offered:

Degree	Specialization
Bachelor of Technology (BTech)	* Civil Engineering * Computer Science and Engineering * Electronics and Communication Engineering * Electrical and Electronic Engineering * Mechanical Engineering
Postgraduate Courses	Master of Computer Applications
Ph.D.	Physics

== Rankings ==
KLEIT was placed into band of top 251-300 colleges in the National Institutional Ranking Framework (NIRF) 2021. It was the only engineering institution from North Karnataka under Visvesvaraya Technological University (VTU) to achieve this ranking.
