= Rajeev Institute of Technology =

Engineering college in Karnataka, India

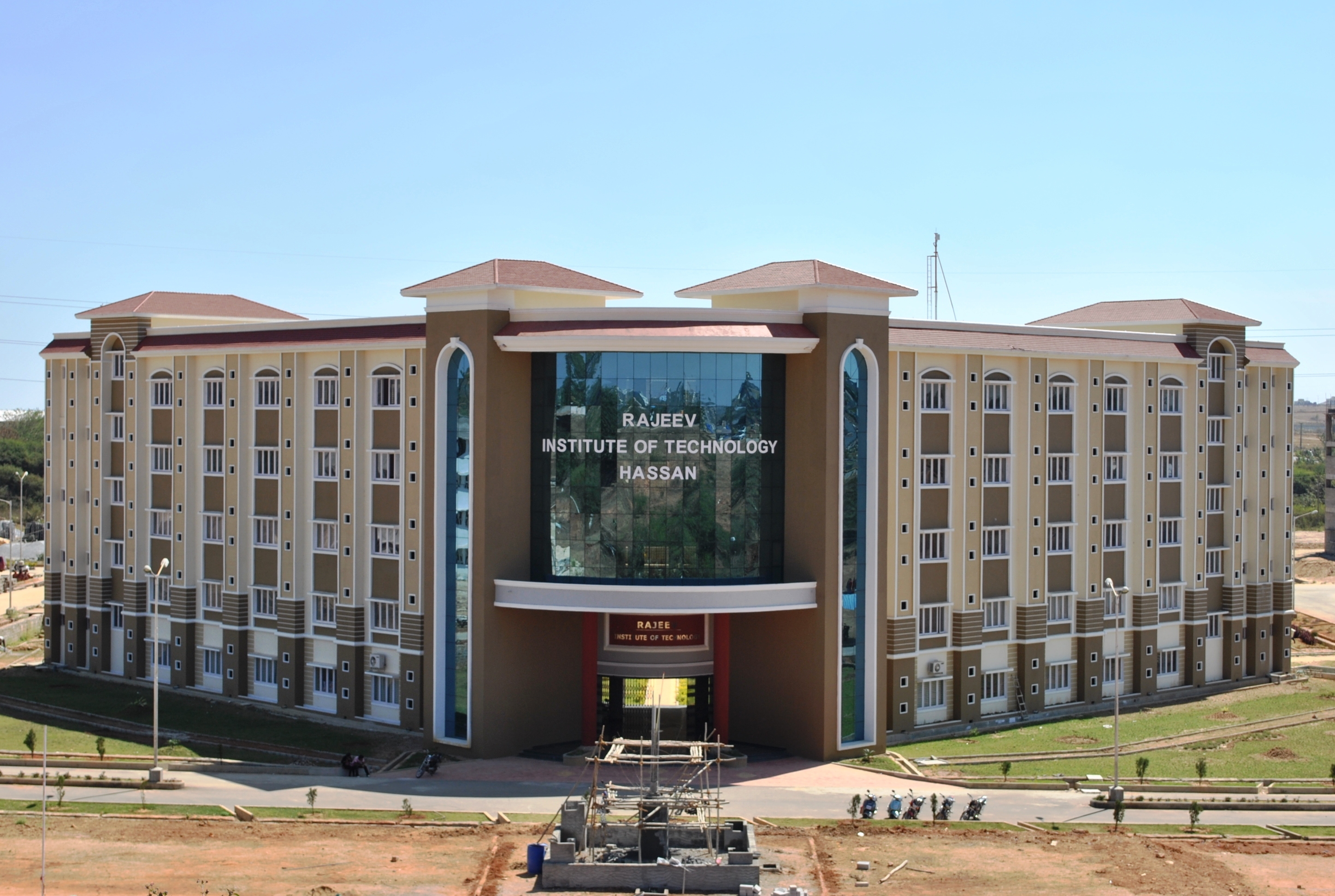
- Type: Private co-educational un-aided engineering college
- Established: 2008
- Founder: Dr.V.Rajeev
- Affiliations: Visvesvaraya Technological University (VTU), Belgaum
- President: Dr.Rachana Rajeev
- Principal: Dr.Mahesh P K
- Academic staff: 110
- Total staff: 180
- Undergraduates: ~1920
- Postgraduates: ~120
- Location: Hassan, Karnataka, India; 12°59′27.0″N 76°06′53.82″E
- Campus: Urban, 21 acres (85,000 m^{2}), 7 km (4.3 mi) from Hassan city on Bangalore-Mangalore Bypass Road
- Colors: Blue and white
- Website: www.rithassan.ac.in
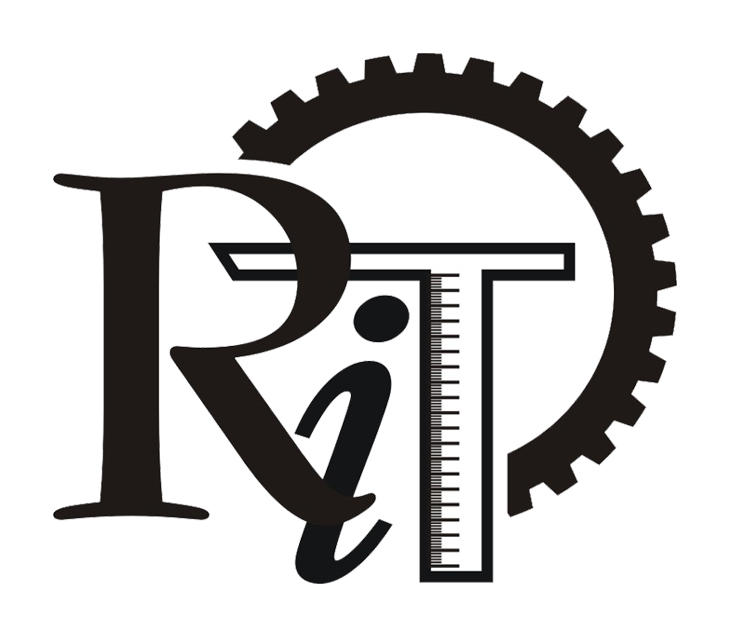

Rajeev Institute of Technology (RIT), is a private technical co-educational engineering college located in Hassan, Karnataka. It is one of the renowned and reputed Institution among the four Engineering colleges in Hassan City. It was started as one in the galaxy of Technical Colleges in the year 2008. Rajeev Institute of Technology in Hassan was established under the aegis of Rajeev Education Trust. The institution is affiliated with the Visvesvaraya Technological University, Belagavi. The college is built on a campus of about 21 acres and is a technical education center with well equipped infrastructure.

== Facilities ==
=== Library ===
The institution has a spacious library with a seating capacity for 150 students. It has 12000 volumes of books with 1275 titles. 47 national and 16 international journals are available in the library.

=== Hostel ===
Separate hostels for boys and girls are provided. Boys Hostel is located inside the campus with the capacity over 500 and Girls Hostel is located inside the Hassan City with the capacity over 250. Regular college buses will be running between Hostel to prominent localities of the city.

=== Medical facilities ===
The trust is running a 300-bed hospital at Hassan and medical facility will be provided to the students and staff. The doctors will be visiting to the college.

=== Transport ===
Rajeev Education Trust maintains a fleet of vehicles including several buses to transport students to their respective study centers and to their respective hostels. The transport facility is also provided to students and the staff of the colleges from different places of Hassan and surrounding area. The buses are also provided to the students for University related works, fests and for sports and cultural competitions held in different colleges.

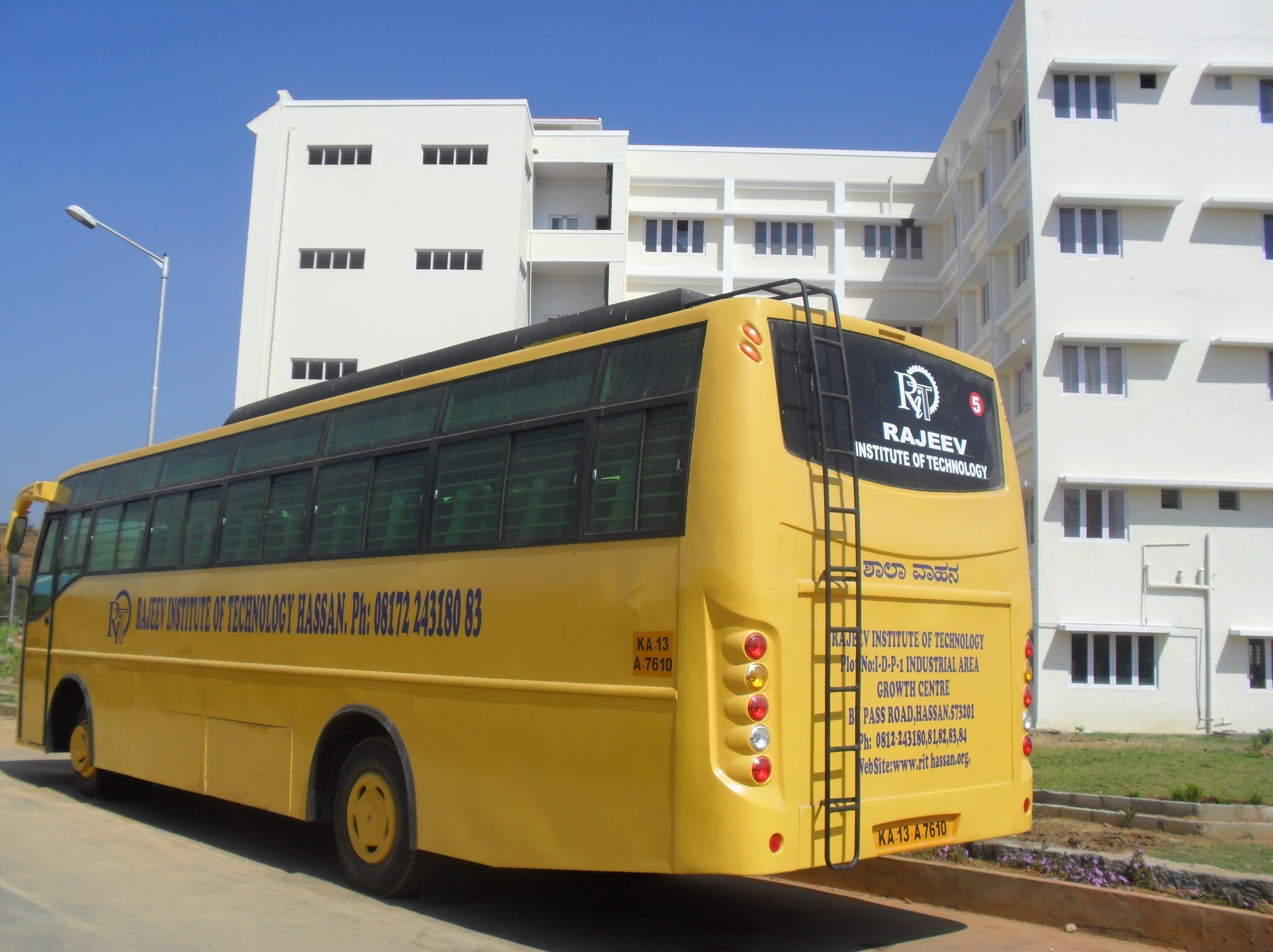
Transport-RIT Bus

=== Canteen ===
The college is running a canteen ("Santhrupthi and Dosa corner") to cater to the needs of students, staff and visitors

=== Wi-fi ===
The campus is Wi-fi enabled.

== Academic units and programs ==
Rajeev institute of Technology offers undergraduate Bachelor of Engineering (B.E) programmes in six disciplines and Post Graduate programmes in three disciplines, namely:

Courses
Course	Intake	Type of Course	Year of start
B.E in Electronics and Communication Engineering	60	UG	2008
B.E in Computer Science And Engineering	120	UG	2008
B.E in Electrical And Electronics Engineering	60	UG	2008
B.E in Information Science Engineering	60	UG	2008
B.E in Mechanical Engineering	60	UG	2009
B.E in Civil Engineering	60	UG	2010
B.E in CSE (Artificial Intelligence and Machine learning)	60	UG	2022
MBA (Master in Business Administration)	60	PG	2009
M.Tech in VLSI and Embedded Systems Master of Technology	18	PG	2012
M.Tech in Computer Science and Engineering Master of Technology	18	PG	2012

== Achievements ==
=== Academic ===
Vanada N Bidare, Dept of Civil Engineering, secured University third rank during VTU 17th annual convocation) Chethan Kumar M, Dept of Mechanical Engineering has topped university in third semester examinations Dec-2010/Jan-2011 (777 out of 900)

Deepthi S.S, Dept of Electronics and Communication Engineering and Wilma Julius, Dept of Electrical and Electronics has scored 125 out 125 marks in Engineering Mathematics-IV exam, June–July 2011

== Placements ==
The college offers good placements for students. The Placement Cell is working with a goal of 100% placement for eligible candidates. 'Mr. Sanjay Kumar A C', Training and Placement officer (TPO), is the current placement officer. Companies to which students got placed are Persistent Systems Pvt.Ltd, Continental, HCL, TCS, Wipro, Infosys, Capgemini, Cognizant, Mindtree, Innominds, KPIT, Zensar, PEOL Technologies, Mahindra Aerospace, Hexaware, EY etc.

== MoUs ==
Rajeev Institute of Technology has recently signed a Memorandum of Understanding (MoU) with 'ICT Academy', for providing assistance in Training and Skill development as well as Placement assistance for Management Vertical.
