= Appa Institute of Engineering and Technology =

Coordinates: 17°19′45.09″N 76°49′10.44″E

- Type: Affiliated to VTU, approved by AICTE
- Established: 2002
- Founder: Dr. Sharanabaswappa Appa
- Affiliations: VTU Belagavi
- Students: 1746
- Undergraduates: 5 Courses
- Postgraduates: 3 Courses
- Location: Kalaburagi, Karnataka, India
- Campus: Urban
- Website: http://www.appaengg.org

Appa Institute of Engineering and Technology is an engineering college affiliated to Visvesvaraya Technological University located in Kalaburagi in the state of Karnataka, India. The college was established in 2002 . The college campus is situated at Vidya Nagar, Kalaburagi.

== Courses ==
Bachelor of Engineering[UG]

- Computer Science Engineering
- Information Science and Engineering
- Civil Engineering
- Mechanical Engineering
- Electronics and Communications.

Postgraduate M-Tech courses[PG]

- Computer Science& Engineering
- Computer Network Engineering

=== Other Postgraduate courses ===
Master of Business Administration.[7]

== See also ==
- Education in India
- Literacy in India
- Degrees in India
