= Anuvartik Mirji Bharatesh Institute of Technology =

Engineering college in Belgaum, Karnataka, India

- Motto: Tejasvi nāvadhītamastu तेजस्वि नावधीतमस्तु (Sanskrit)
- Motto in English: Let our study be enlightening
- Type: Private Engineering College
- Established: 2024 (2 years ago)
- Affiliations: Visvesvaraya Technological University
- Principal: Veena Karchi
- Academic staff: 37 (Appointment Type Regular)
- Students: 1002
- Undergraduates: 941
- Postgraduates: 61
- Location: Basavan Kudachi Extension, Shindholli Cross, Belagavi, Karnataka, 591124, India; 15°51′22.19″N 74°34′38.97″E
- Campus: Suburban, 30,000 sq ft (0.69 acres)
- Acronym: AMBIT
- Website: ambit.edu.in

The Bharatesh Institute of Technology (Anuvartik Mirji Bharatesh Institute of Technology or AMBIT or BIT ) is private engineering college in Belagavi, Karnataka, India. AMBIT started functioning from May 2024, at the Bharatesh Chandragiri campus in Basavana Kudachi near the Belagavi airport in Sambra.

== Academics ==
=== Departments and courses ===
==== Undergraduate ====
- Artificial Intelligence and Machine Learning (AIML)
- Computer Science & Engineering (CSE)
- Electronics & Communication Engineering (ECE)
- Information Science & Engineering (ISE)

==== Postgraduate ====
Master of Computer Applications (MCA)

=== Admission ===
Admissions for Bachelor of Engineering (B.E.) degree is through:

- Karnataka Common Entrance Test
- COMED-K
- Diploma CET, as lateral entry for students with diploma degrees

Admissions for Master of Computer Applications (MCA) degree is through:

- Post Graduate Karnataka CET (PG CET)
- KMAT

The counselling process is based on rank secured in the respective entrance examinations.

=== Affiliation ===
The college has been approved by the All India Council for Technical Education (AICTE) and is affiliated to Visvesvaraya Technological University (VTU) Belagavi.

=== Accreditation, Rankings ===
AMBIT being 2 years, 6 months old, and first graduate batch expected in 2028 (under, and post graduate), is not yet accredited by National Assessment and Accreditation Council (NAAC), and National Board of Accreditation (NBA), or ranked by National Institutional Ranking Framework (NIRF) (minimum requirement of: for departments accreditation by NBA is at least two batches of graduated students, or for institute accreditation by NAAC it has been established for at least six years, and for ranking by NIRF is at least three batches of graduated students (NAAC reference link caution, link is http: not https)) .

=== MoU ===
AMBIT has MoU with Belagavi Startup Association (BSA), signed on 05 August 2024, with 2000 sq ft campus space provided to companies in BSA as workspace.

== See also ==
- Visvesvaraya Technological University
- Indian Institute of Technology Dharwad
- Indian Institute of Science
- National Institute of Technology Karnataka, Surathkal
