= Government Engineering College, Karwar =

Indian Engineering College

- Motto: Providing better technical education to the young minds to empower India with advanced technology.
- Type: Govt Engineering College
- Established: 2009
- Affiliations: Visvesvaraya Technological University VTU, Belgaum
- Location: Karwar, Karnataka, India

Government Engineering College Karwar is an Engineering college in Majali, Karwar, Uttara Kannada district of Karnataka, India. Situated 6 mile away from Karwar. The college is affiliated to Visvesvaraya Technological University, Belgaum. It is also approved by All India Council for Technical Education AICTE, New Delhi.

== About ==
Established in 2009. The aim of the college is to provide good technical education to rural area students.

The institution provides computer-based learning programs to meet the current needs of industry and business.

== Courses ==
Following are the courses in the college:

- Civil Engineering
- Computer Science & Engg.
- Electronics & Comm. Engg.
- Mechanical Engineering
