= Sambhram Institute of Technology =

- Established: 2001
- Affiliations: Visvesvaraya Technological University, Belgaum.
- Principal: DR. HG Chandrakanth
- Location: Karnataka, India; 12°54′30.4″N 77°33′58.5″E
- Website: www.sambhramit.com

Sambhram Institute of Technology was started in 2001 in Bangalore, Karnataka, India. It is a private self funding institution, affiliated to Visvesvaraya Technological University It is approved by AICTE, Government of Karnataka & VTU.AICTE. The campus is situated in M.S.Palya, Jalahalli East, Bangalore-97, India.

== Courses offered ==
- Mechanical Engineering
- Computer Science and Engineering
- Information Science and Engineering
- Electronics and Communication Engineering
- Civil Engineering
- Artificial Intelligence and Machine Learning
- Artificial Intelligence and Data Science
- Cyber Security

== Verticals ==
The Sambhram Group of Institutions was established in 2001 by the Sambhram Education Trust. The organisation manages 12 educational institutions across the Indian states of Karnataka and Andhra Pradesh, offering education at the secondary, pre-university, undergraduate, postgraduate, and doctoral levels.

The institutions under the group include:

- Sambhram Institute of Technology
- Sambhram Academy of Management Studies
- Sambhram College of Hotel Management
- Sambhram Institute of Medical Sciences and Research
- KGF College of Dental Sciences and Hospital
- Sambhram College and Institute of Nursing, KGF
- Sambhram Degree College, Chittoor
- Sambhram Pre-University College, KGF
- Sambhram Pre-University College
- Sambhram Junior College, Chittoor
- Sambhram School, Chittoor
