= Dr. T. Thimmaiah Institute of Technology =

College in Karnataka, India

- Golden Valley Institute of Technology
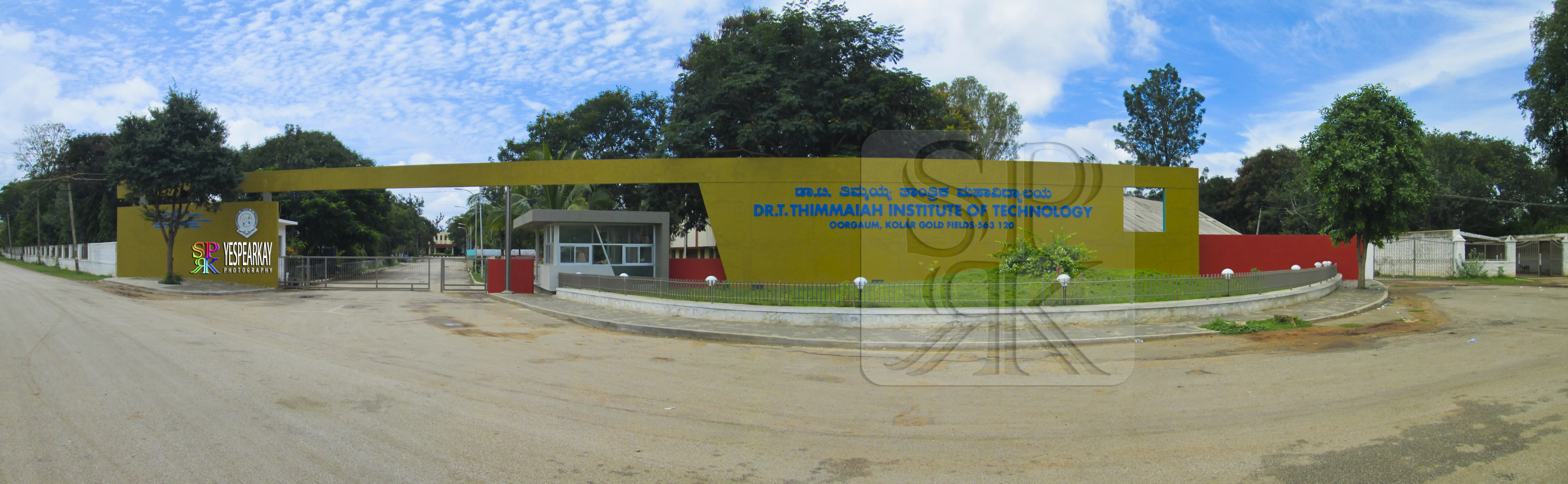
- Former names: Golden Valley Institute of Technology
- Affiliations: Visvesvaraya Technological University
- President: Dr. T. Venkat Vardhan
- Principal: Dr. Syed Ariff
- Academic staff: 70
- Location: Kolar Gold Fields, Karnataka, India
- Campus: Oorgaum Post, K.G.F. – 563 120, Bangarpet Taluk, Kolar District
- Website: www.drttit.edu.in

Dr. T. Thimmaiah Institute of Technology (Dr.TTIT) is a college in Kolar Gold Fields, Karnataka, India, under the VTU Visvesvaraya Technological University recognized by the Government of Karnataka and approved by the All India Council of Technical Education AICTE, New Delhi. Formerly Known as Golden Valley Institute of Technology.

== The college ==
The college provides professional education in engineering streams such as Computer science, Electrical & Electronics, Mechanical, Mining and Civil.

== Campus and location ==
The campus is set in a 25-acre (100,000 m^{2}) area. The campus has facilities like library and WiFi. The college has "The UFO" outlet where all varieties of food is available for the students at greater standards.

== Admission procedure and eligibility ==
Students are admitted on merit, according to the directives of the Government of Karnataka, both to the Government Quota and the Management Quota.

Eligibility for admission to B.E. courses is a pass in 10+2 class or equivalent with a minimum 45% in Science group. Mathematics and Physics are compulsory Science subjects. Any other Science subjects like Chemistry can be the Third Science subjects.

=== Undergraduate programs ===
- Mechanical Engineering
- Mining Engineering
- Computer Science and Engineering
- Electronics and Communication Engineering
- Electrical and Electronics Engineering
- Civil Engineering

=== Postgraduate Programs ===
- Machine Design
- Digital Communications and Networking
