= S.J.M. Institute of Technology =

S.J.M. Institute of Technology (S.J.M.I.T)
- Type: Private un-aided Engineering and Technology Institute
- Established: 1980
- Affiliations: VTU
- Principal: Dr.P B Bharath
- Location: Chitradurga, Karnataka, India; 14°14′20″N 76°23′08″E
- Campus: 35 acre
- Website: www.sjmit.ac.in

SJM Institute of technology (SJMIT) was established in the academic year 1980–81, with blessings of then president of SJM Vidyapeetha Sri Mallikarjuna Murugharajendra Mahaswamiji. Located just adjacent to the National Highway-4, SJMIT has a clean green campus with all facilities spread over a vast area of 35 acres.

The college is recognized by All India Council for Technical Education (AICTE) New Delhi, approved by Govt. of Karnataka and affiliated to Visveswariah Technological University (VTU) Belgaum.

It offers Bachelor of Engineering(B.E) in 5 Engineering Disciplines, and Master of Technology(M.Tech) in Computer Science and Engineering, Thermal Power Engineering and Structural Engineering.

== Courses ==
Undergraduate

The college offers four year Undergraduate courses in 5 Disciplines of engineering:

- Civil Engineering
- Computer Science & Engineering
- Electrical & Electronics Engineering
- Electronics & Communication Engineering
- Mechanical Engineering

Postgraduate

The Institute offers the following Post graduate course:

- Master of Technology with specializations in Computer Science & Engineering.
- Master of Technology with specializations in Thermal Power Engineering.
- Master of Technology with specializations in Structural Engineering.

Doctor of Philosophy

The Institute offers the following Research Subjects

- Electrical & Electronics Engineering
- Mechanical Engineering
- Civil Engineering

== See also ==
- Chitradurga
