= GSS Institute of Technology =

Engineering college in Bangalore, Karnataka, India

- GSS प्रौद्योगिकी संस्थान
- Motto: शिक्षा के माध्यम से अधिकारिता
- Motto in English: "Empowerment Through Education"
- Type: Private un-aided engineering college
- Established: 2004
- Affiliations: None. Derecognised by VTU in 2014.
- Principal: H B Niranjan
- Director: Surya Singh
- Administrative staff: 300
- Postgraduates: 50
- Location: Kengeri, Bangalore, Karnataka, 560060, India; 12°55′10″N 77°28′0″E
- Campus: Urban, 60,703 m^{2} (653,400 sq ft)

GSS Institute of Technology (GSSIT), is a private co-educational engineering college approved by the All India Council of Technical Education affiliated to Visweswaraiah Technological University established in 2004 and managed by H.R Charitable Trust. The campus is located on a hilly 15 acres (6.1 ha), surrounded by a green plantation, on the Byrohalli-Kengeri main road on the southwestern edge of Bangalore City. It is situated in Bangalore in Karnataka state, India. GSSIT is recognized as a research centre by Visvesvaraya Technological University (VTU).

GSSIT is a technical institute offering undergraduate and post-graduate programmes in several streams of Engineering, IT and Management. It has over 500 students. The college also supports environmental measures. The main Avenue is flanked on either side by green covers, which is irrigated with wastewater from the campus, treated in the water treatment plant. The hot water storage and supply system of the on-campus boarding is entirely solar powered. The campus also houses an environmental-friendly cafeteria. Recently a group of four higher semester students invented, how to increase mileage using water.

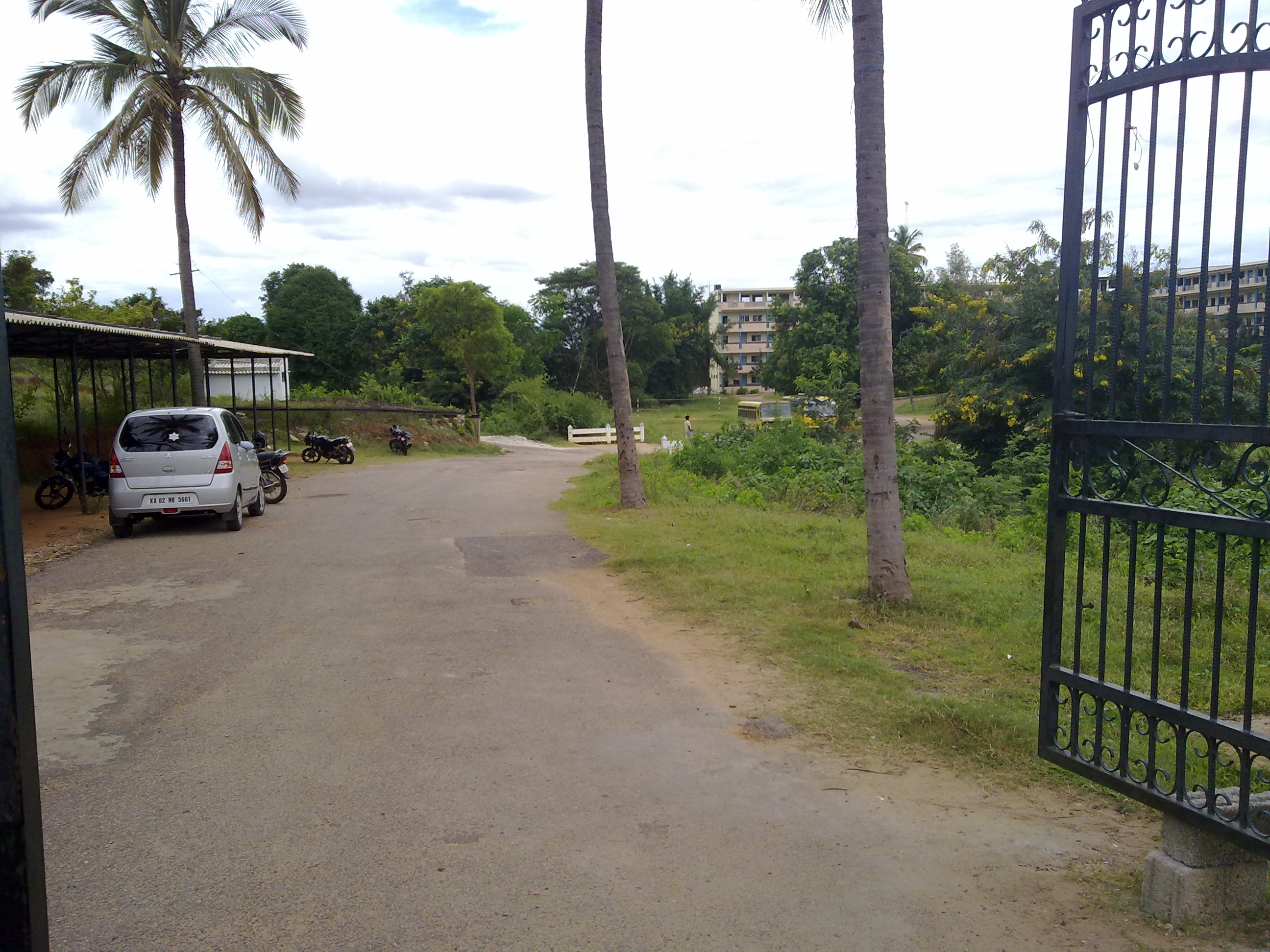
Gssit college entrance

== Courses and departments ==
=== Engineering Departments ===
The following departments offer a four-year Bachelor of Engineering (B.E.) course in engineering:

- Department of Civil Engineering
- Department of Computer Science and Engineering
- Department of Electrical and Electronics Engineering
- Department of Electronics and Communication Engineering
- Department of Mechanical Engineering..

Recently with prior approval of AICTE, the institute has increased its annual intake

== Admission ==
To get admission, students must appear in the examination conducted by the Karnataka state government and the Consortium of Medical, Engineering and Dental Colleges of Karnataka

== Student life ==
Students participate in technical and cultural societies and clubs, to develop their managerial and technical skills.

=== Robotics club ===
The club organises robotics events and workshops in techfest and other times, round the year. A final year student is generally selected as a chairperson of the club.

=== Festivals ===
Students celebrate technical and cultural festivals held in every even semester of the academic year. "Kalataranga" is the major attraction which held in month of April every year. Many reputed colleges affiliated to university take part in this festival.

== Library ==
The Central Library serves the needs of students, faculty and staff members. The library has CD-Rom, on-line databases, journals, audio and video cassettes, dissertations and project reports. Senior Faculties and professors are actively involved in writing journals and books.

== Controversy ==
The collegeRef No. VTU/REG/2014-15/4000 dated 02/08/2014.

== Gallery ==
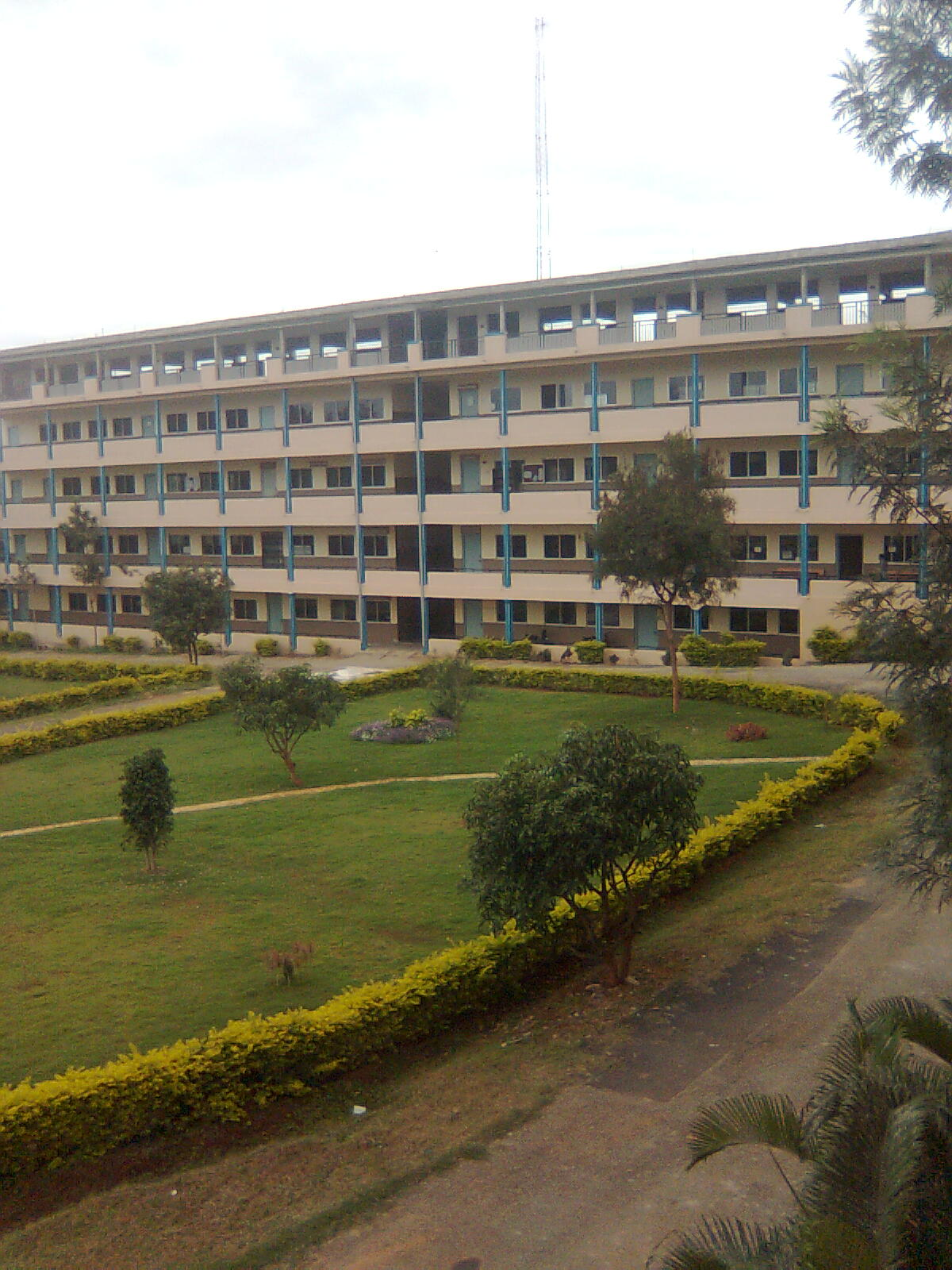
Academic block gssit

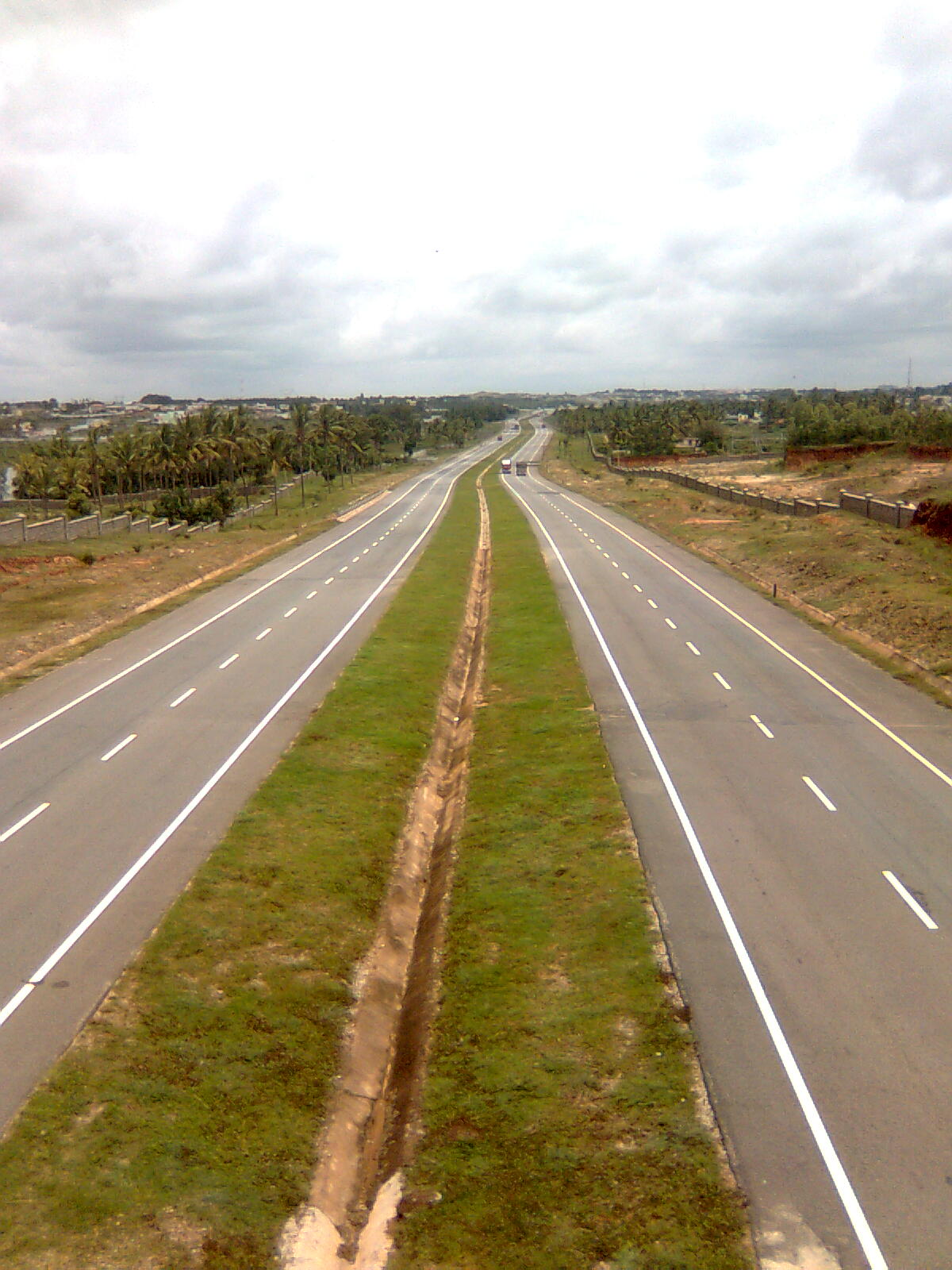
Way to gssit

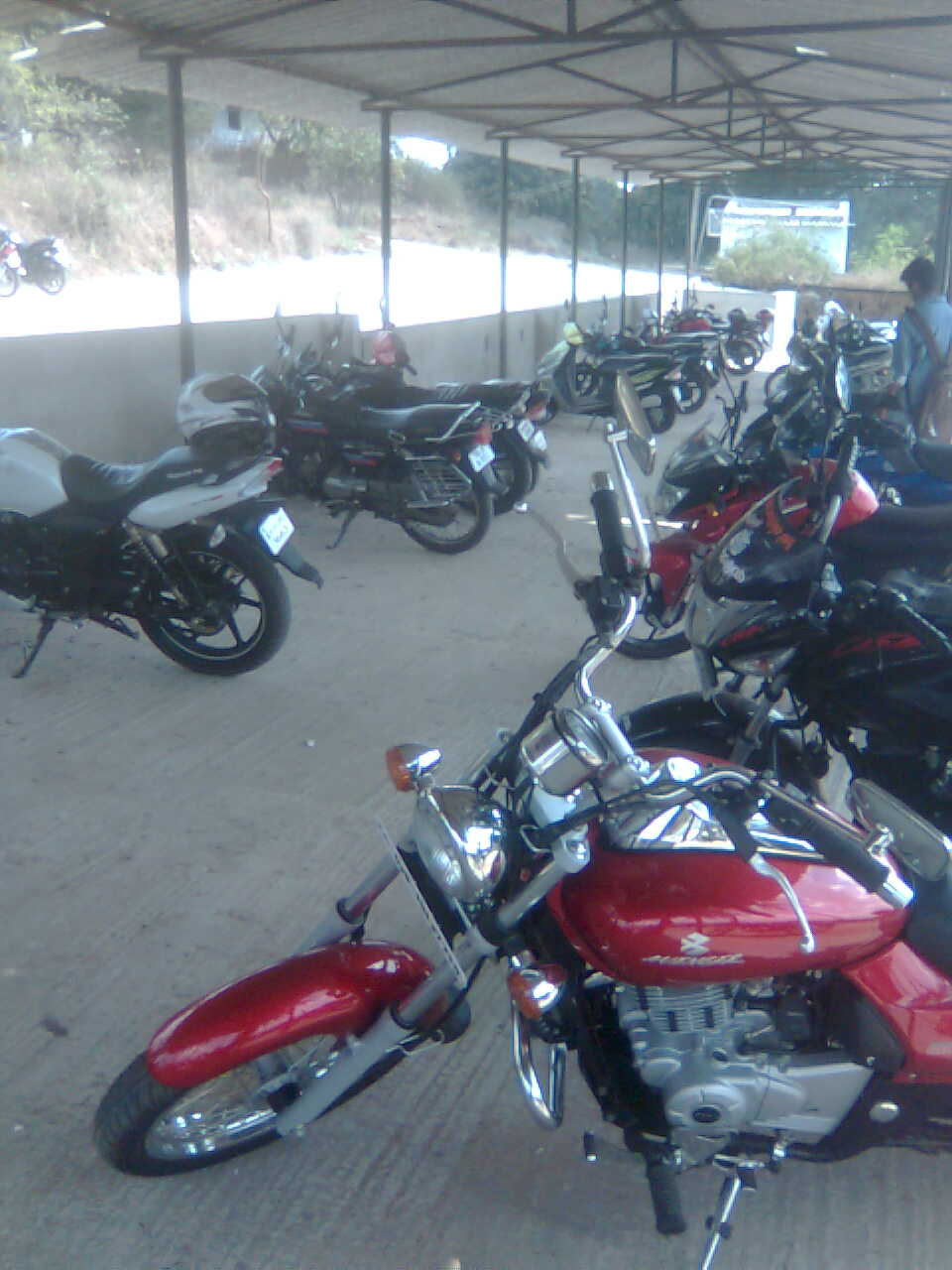
PARKING LOT

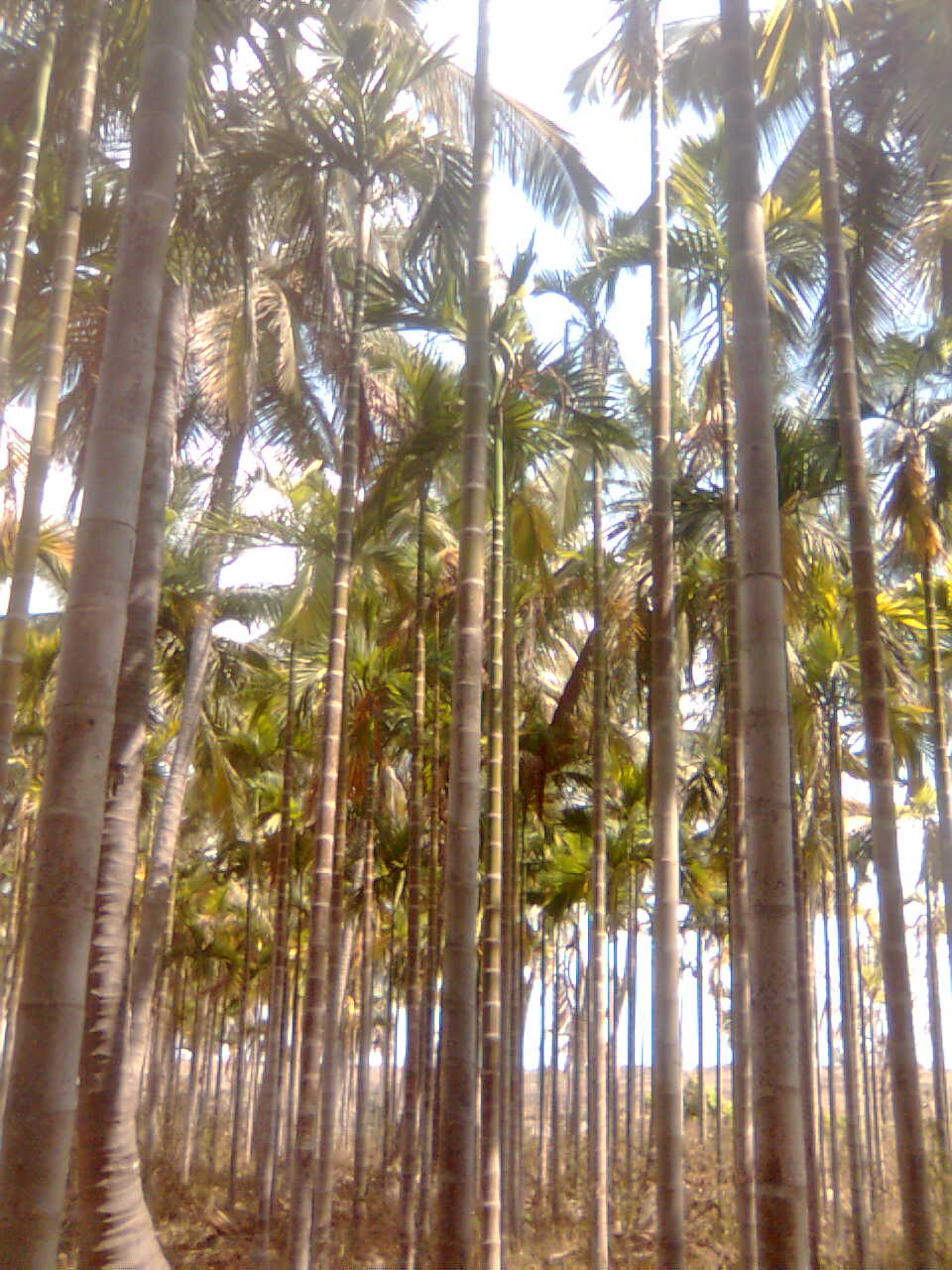
Flora At Campus
