= BTL Institute of Technology =

Engineering college in Bengaluru, India

Coordinates: 12°48′35.86″N 77°41′36.33″E

- Motto: In pursuit of excellence
- Type: Engineering College
- Active: 1997–2021
- Founder: Late B.T Lakshman
- Academic affiliations: Visvesvaraya Technological University
- Location: Bommasandra, Karnataka, 560099, India
- Approvals: AICTE
- Website: http://btlit.ac.in

BTL Institute of Technology (BTLIT) was an engineering college situated in Bommasandra Industrial Area near Electronics City in Bengaluru, India. The college was founded in 1997, initially being affiliated to the Bangalore University, Bengaluru. Since 1998, the college has been associated with Visvesvaraya Technological University, Belagavi.

== Founder ==
Late B.T Lakshman an NRI is the founder of the institution. He earlier worked as a civil engineer in Delaware, United States.

== Courses ==
Undergraduate (B.Tech.)

- Computer Science
- Information Science
- Electronics and Communication
- Mechanical Engineering
- Electrical and Electronics

Postgraduate (M.Tech.)

- Computer Science
- Information Science
- Electronics and Communication

== Closure ==
BTLIT was closed permanently in 2021 due to lack of admissions and poor management of the institution that was a result of dispute between partners of the late founders.
