= Global Academy of Technology =

Private Engineering College in Bengaluru, Karnataka

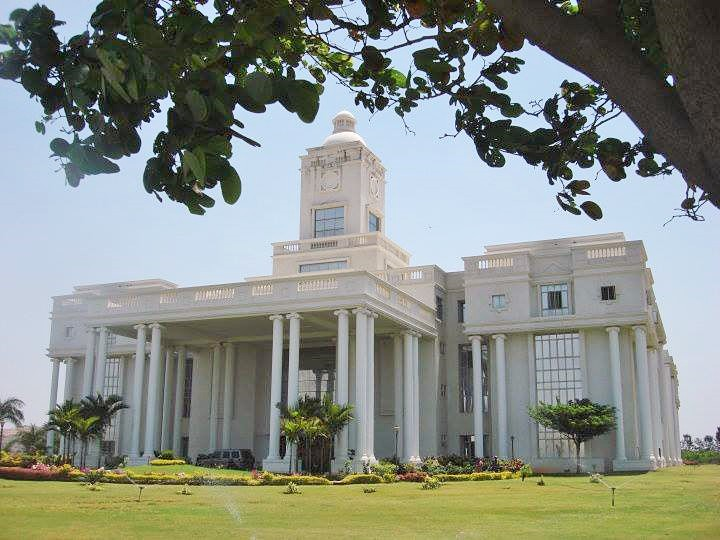
- Motto: Growing Ahead Of Time
- Type: Private un-aided Autonomous engineering college
- Established: 2001
- Founders: D. K. Shivakumar
- Affiliations: VTU
- Location: Bangalore, Karnataka, India
- Campus: Urban
- Approvals: AICTE
- Website: http://www.gat.ac.in

The Global Academy of Technology (GAT) is an Autonomous engineering and management college in Bangalore, Karnataka. It was established in the year 2001. The campus has more than 3000+ students and 300 faculty and staff.

It is managed by Karnataka Pradesh Congress Committee President D.K. Shivakumar.

== History ==
The National Education Foundation (NEF) was established in the year 2000, in Bangalore, the IT capital of India. The primary focus of the Foundation is to cater to students of all strata across the country, starting from Primary to Post Graduate Education in all disciplines. NEF has a broad spread of educational institutions — National Hill View Public School (NHVPS), Global College of Nursing (GCN) and Global Academy of Technology (GAT) offering Engineering, Postgraduate MBA, M.Tech., M.Sc. Engg. and Ph.D. programs

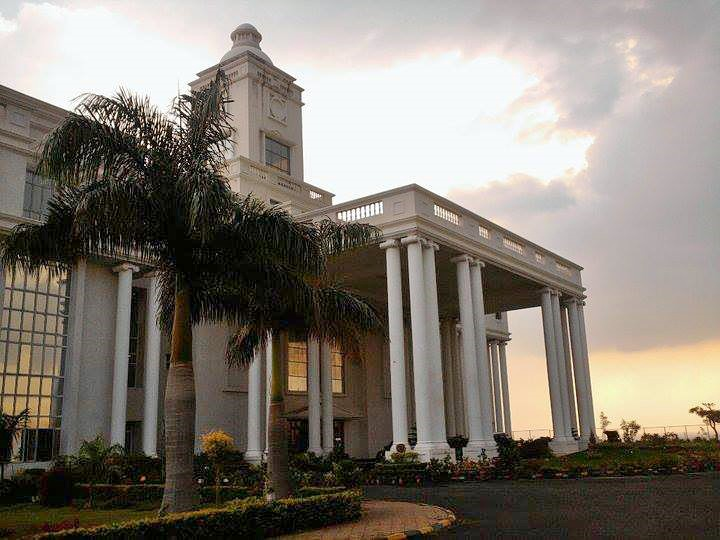
Front view of college

== Campus ==
The Global Academy of Technology, has a 10-acre campus located in Rajarajeshwari Nagar. GAT has class rooms, laboratories seminar halls, Auditorium a library with volumes of recommended and reference books along with e-journals and computer centres. GAT provides 24 x 7 Wi-Fi facilities and web based CMS for video streaming which is an integral part of learning.

== Academics ==
=== Under Graduate Courses(UG) ===
Global Academy of Technology offers Bachelor of Engineering (B.E) programs at the Under Graduate level. The Program spans over 4 years and is offered in 8 different branches. The Course structure is designed by the faculty of the college with the consultation of the faculty at VTU and IISc.

GAT offers courses in the following branches:

- Computer Science and Engineering
- B.E. Computer Science and Engineering (AI&ML)
- Information Science and Engineering
- Civil engineering
- Electronics and Communication Engineering
- Mechanical Engineering
- Electrical and Electronics Engineering
- Artificial Intelligence & Data Science
- Artificial Intelligence & Machine Learning
- Aeronautical Engineering
- Bachelor of Science (honours)

=== Post Graduate Courses(PG) ===
Master of Technology

The institute offers 2-year Master of Technology (M.Tech.) in the following branches:

- Computer Science and Engineering
- Structural engineering
- Thermal Engineering
- Digital Electronics & Communication

Master of Science

The institute offers 2-year Master of Science (M.Sc.) in the following branches:

- Civil engineering
- Thermal Engineering

MBA

GAT also offers 2-year Master of Business Administration program.

Established in the year 2004 with an intake of 60, the department caters to the current intake of 120 in the areas of Marketing, Finance and Human Resource Management.

Research Programs

- Research in Science & Humanities, Management Studies
- VTU affiliated research centers in Engineering

== Research Facilities ==
Global Academy of Technology has a Research and Consultancy Centre.

Research Areas@GAT:

- Water Resources Engineering, Engineering Geology and Hydrogeology
- Remote Sensing, Geographic Information Systems and Geophysical Investigations & Advanced Engineering Surveying
- Alternate & Green Energy Sources
- Hydroelectric projects, Tunneling and Environmental Impact Assessment
- Material characterization, Thermal Management and Tribological studies of Composites
- Machine Learning and Artificial Intelligence
- Web Enabled IT Services
- UWB Antenna Communication and RFID applications
- Image Processing
- Wholesale, Retail and Rural Marketing

== Students Corner ==
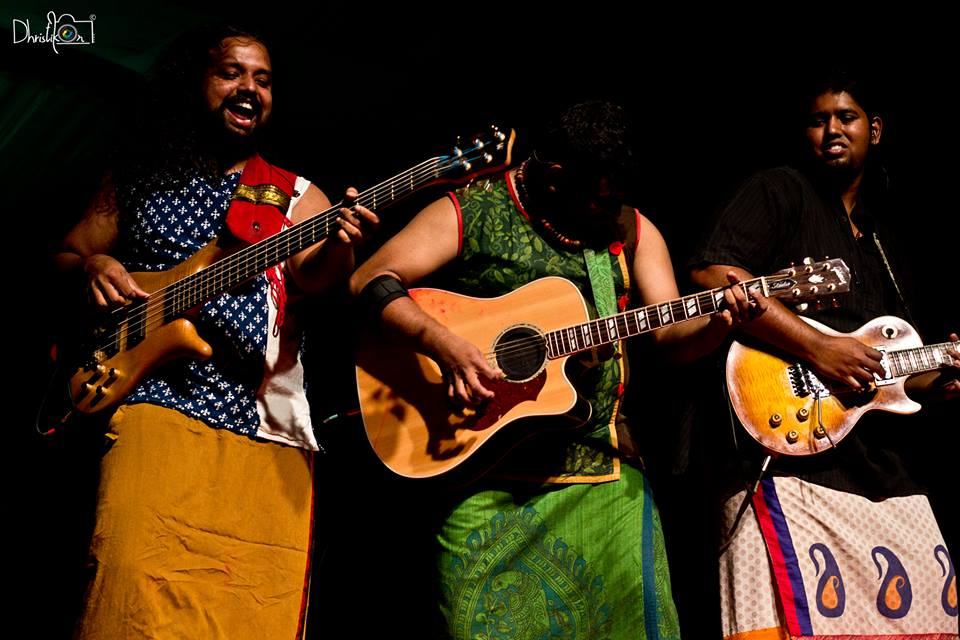
Raghu Dixit performing in college during a music concert

=== Student Clubs ===
Every department has its own student club to host activities related to the domain in addition to hosting interdepartmental competitions and institution level competitions. Some the student clubs are:

- IT-VIRTUOSO — Dept of CSE
- INSPIRE — Dept of ISE
- HYSTERESIS — Dept of EEE
- RESONANCE -Dept of ECE

The CSE student club - IT-Virtuoso is the oldest and is the largest student club in the institution, which conducts the activities such as computer programming, gaming, paper presentations, quiz etc. by students and for students. As part of the IT-club activity, monthly e-newsletter and bi-monthly e-magazine released and hosted on the college web-site for the benefit of students at large.

== Sports ==
Cricket Field, Basket Ball Court, Volleyball Court, Net Ball Court, Table Tennis, Gymnasium, Chess and Carrom are the sports facilities.

== Gallery ==
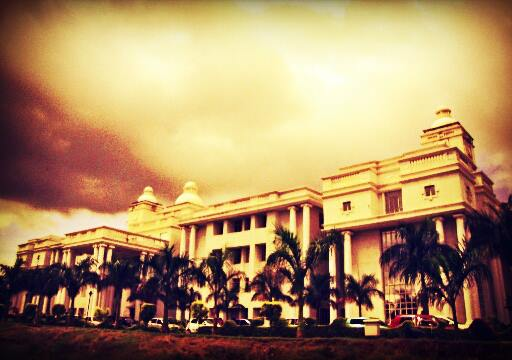

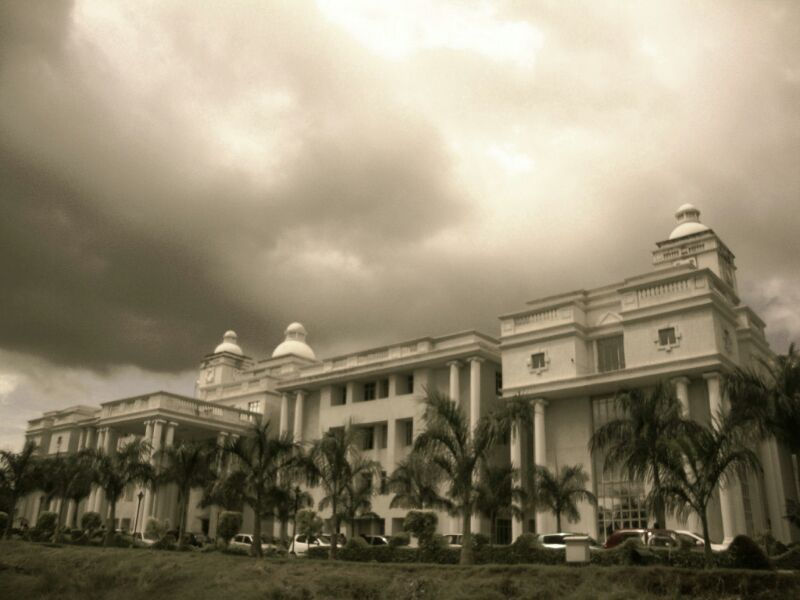

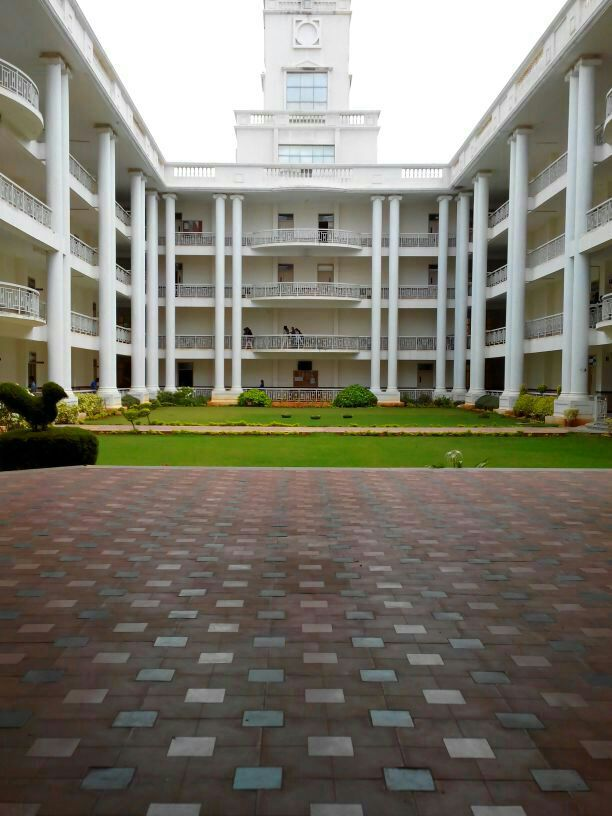

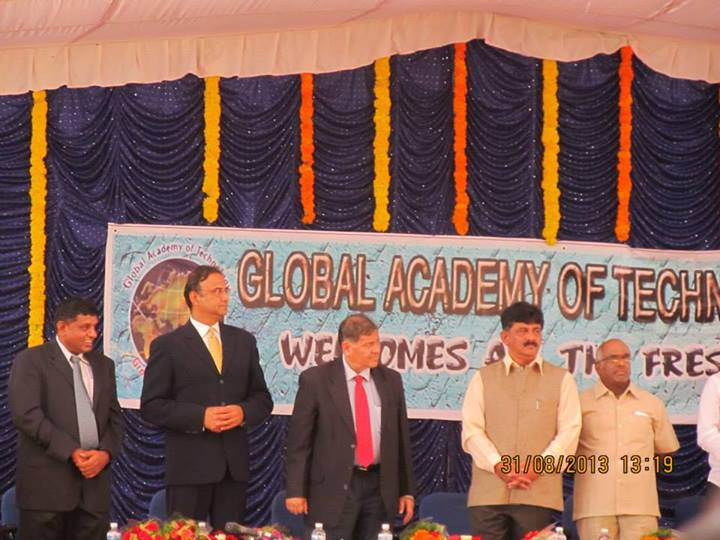
