= Visvesvaraya Institute of Advanced Technology =

- Motto: Modalu mānavanāgu
- Type: Public
- Established: 2009
- Vice-Chancellor: Dr.Karisiddapa
- Location: Muddenahalli-Kanivenarayanapura, Karnataka, India
- Campus: Rural
- Website: www.vtu.ac.in

Visvesvaraya Institute of Advanced Technology, also known as VIAT, is a research institute being constructed near Muddenahalli, Karnataka, India. The research institute was proposed on Engineer's Day 2008 in Muddenahalli, the birthplace of legendary engineer, Sir Mokshagundam Visvesvarayya. The foundation stone was commemorated by MP Veerappa Moily in February 2010. The institute is located on 200 acres (0.81 km^{2}) of land nestled in the Nandi Hills and is expected to cost 600 crores.

In the initial years, VIAT will focus on research in embedded technology, software quality, agricultural engineering and bioengineering. Each department will function as a “discovery-innovation centre.” The institute will offer graduate and PhD level courses in the sciences and will be starting a 50 crore joint automotive research and design centre with Bosch at Muddenahalli.

The research institute is a branch of Visvesvaraya Technological University (VTU) one of the largest technological universities in India, having 186 colleges affiliated to it with undergraduate (UG) courses in 28 disciplines and postgraduate (PG) programs in 71 disciplines. The intake at UG level is nearly 67,100 students; at the PG level it is about 12,666 students. The University has memorandums of understanding (MOUs) with various leading organizations like IBM, Bosch, INTEL Asia Electronics Inc., Ingersoll-Rand (India) Ltd., and Microsoft. VIAT will offer diversified and advanced engineering courses, and will develop MOUs with select foreign universities to offer some of their courses. This institution will cover all three major aspects of modern higher education such as formal education leading to the award of UG and PG Degrees, sponsored R&D and industrial consultancy, continuing education, education technologies and societal interactions.
