= Navodaya Institute of Technology =

Navodaya Institute of Technology (NIT)
- Other name: NIT
- Motto in English: A Gateway to success in future technology
- Type: Private non-autonomous
- Established: 2009
- Academic affiliations: VTU
- Chairman: S.R. Reddy
- Principal: M. V. Mallikarjuna
- Director: Srinivas T
- Head: N. Bharath Reddy
- Academic staff: 65
- Administrative staff: 20
- Undergraduates: 174
- Doctoral students: 5
- Location: Raichur, Karnataka, India; 16.1895°N 77.3767°E
- Website: www.navodaya.edu.in/engineering/index

Navodaya Institute of Technology (NIT) is a college in Raichur, India, under the VTU Visvesvaraya Technological University recognized by the Government of Karnataka and approved by the All India Council of Technical Education AICTE, New Delhi.

== About ==
Navodaya Institute of Technology (NIT) was started in 2008 by Navodaya Educational Trust (NET) which was established in the year 1992 by the Educationalist and Philanthropist Shri. S. R. Reddy. NET is a premier education service provider in Karnataka, which promotes and provide primary and higher education in the country, having 12 institutions and 5000 students offering 20 academic programs. Aims at developing Navodaya Institute of Technology (NIT) as the most respected and sought-after technical institution of higher learning in Karnataka. NIT got accredited "A" Grade by National Assessment and Accreditation Council (NAAC).

== The college ==
The institute started with five B.E. courses approved by AICTE:

- B.E. Computer Science and Engineering (60)
- B.E. Mechanical Engineering (60)
- B.E. Civil Engineering (60)
- B.E. Electronics and Communication Engineering (60)
- B.E. Electrical and Electronics Engineering (60)
- Later days started with 2 PG Courses
- M.Tech. Mechanical Engineering (Thermal Power Engineering) (09)
- M.Tech. ECE (Digital Communication and Networking) (18)

== Campus and location ==
The campus is set in a 60-acre (240,000 m^{2}) campus and The institute is located in the district headquarter of Raichur in the North Karnataka region, well connected by road and railway and the nearest International Airport is in Hyderabad. The institute is surrounded by a green environment and a hill, away from pollution. The entire campus is maintained green powered by solar energy. The institute is now in its twelfth year of dedicated service.

== Admission procedure and eligibility ==
Students are admitted on merit, according to the directives of the Government of Karnataka, both to the Government Quota and the Management Quota.

Eligibility for admission to B.E. courses is a pass in 10+2 class or equivalent with a minimum 45% in Science group. Mathematics and Physics are compulsory Science subjects. Any other Science subjects like Chemistry can be the Third Science subjects.

=== Undergraduate programs ===
- Mechanical Engineering
- Civil Engineering
- Computer Science and Engineering
- Information Science and Engineering
- Electronics and Communication Engineering
- Electrical and Electronics Engineering
