= GSSS Institute of Engineering & Technology for Women =

Indian engineering school for women

Coordinates: 12.3617°N 76.6288°E

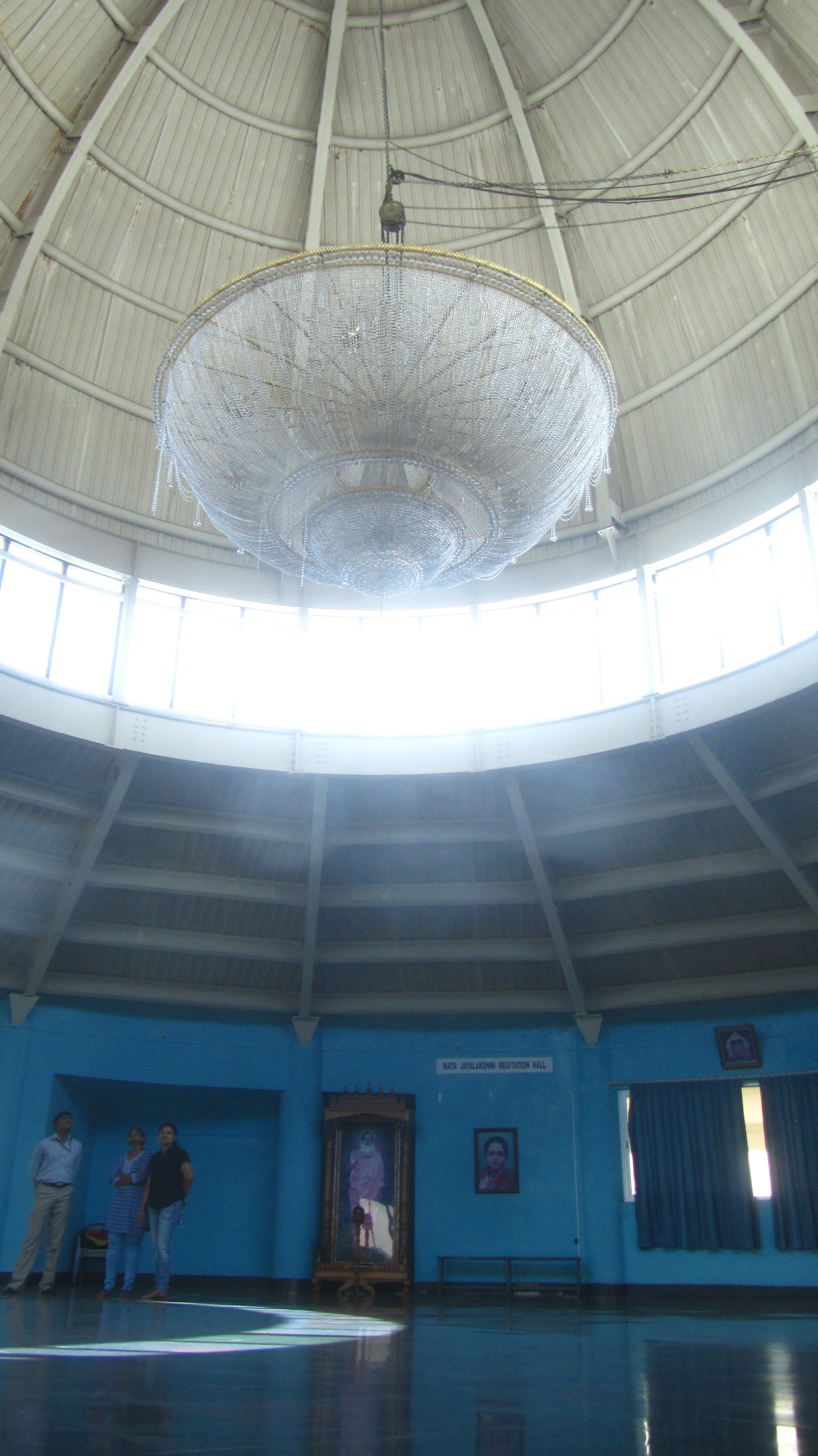
Inside the meditation hall at GSSS

Geetha Shishu Shikshana Sangha Institute of Engineering & Technology for Women (GSSS Mysore) is an engineering institute for women located in Mysuru, Karnataka, India. It is affiliated with Visvesvaraya Technological University and approved by AICTE.
