= Mangalore Institute of Technology and Engineering =

Mangalore Institute of Technology & Engineering
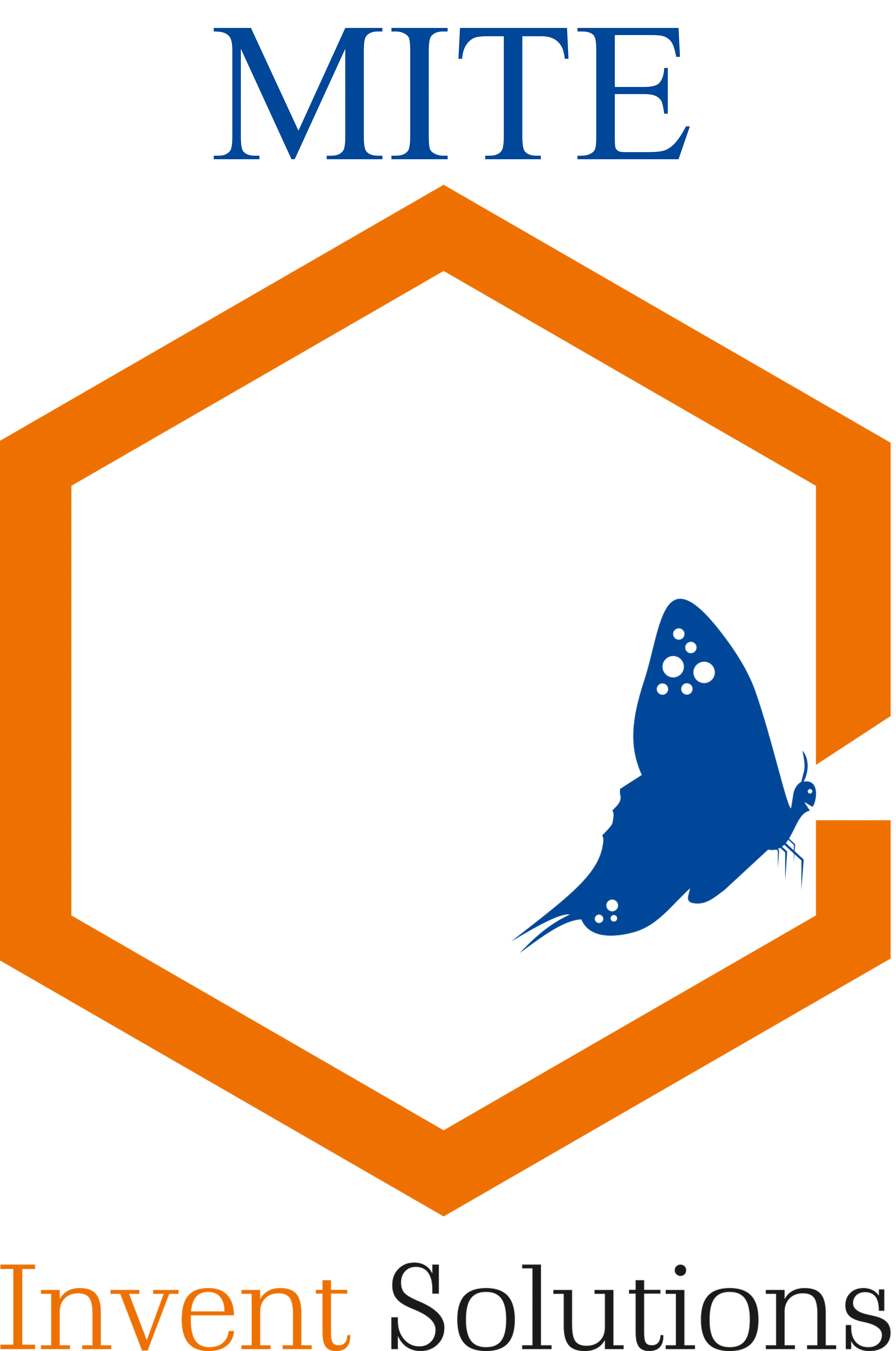
- Type: Private, Un-aided
- Established: 2007
- Affiliations: Visveswaraiah Technological University
- President: Rajesh Chowta
- Principal: Dr. Prashanth C M
- Location: Moodabidri, Mangaluru, Karnataka, India; 13°3′7″N 74°57′53″E
- Campus: Residential
- Nickname: MITE

Mangalore Institute of Technology and Engineering (MITE) is an engineering and management institution located in Mangaluru established by the Rajalaxmi Education Trust under the leadership of Rajesh Chouta in 2007. The institute is affiliated to the Visvesvaraya Technological University, Belgaum, and approved by the All India Council of Technical Education (AICTE), New Delhi. MITE, established in 2007, today has 3000+ students, 180+ Faculty, offering 9 Undergraduate Programs in Engineering, 1 Post Graduate Program in Engineering, Masters of Computer Applications, Master of Business Administration (MBA) and 7 research programs.

== Courses ==
Institute offers 4-year bachelor's degree and 2-year masters's degree programmes

B.E. Degree courses:

- Computer Science & Engineerin
- Information Science & Engineering
- Artificial Intelligence & Machine Learning
- Computer Sc. & Engg (IoT & Cybersecurity with Blockchain technology)
- Electronics & Communications Engineering
- Mechatronics Engineering
- Mechanical Engineering
- Aeronautical Engineering
- Civil Engineering

Postgraduate level:

- M Tech in Computer Science
- MCA-Master of Computer Applications
- MBA-Masters in Business Administration

The course is spread over four semesters with the following Dual specialization in the Management sector

1. Human Resource Management
2. Marketing
3. Finance
