= Sapthagiri College of Engineering, Bengaluru =

Coordinates: 13°4′1.092″N 77°30′11.777″E

Sapthagiri College of Engineering
- Other name: SCE
- Type: Private
- Established: 2001; 25 years ago
- Academic affiliations: Visvesvaraya Technological University
- Chairman: G. Dayanand
- Principal: H. Ramakrishna
- Location: Bangalore, Karnataka, India
- Website: www.sapthagiri.edu.in

Sapthagiri College of Engineering(SCE) is an Engineering college in Bangalore, India started in the year 2001.

== About ==
Sapthagiri College of Engineering (SCE) is located at Chikkasandra, Hesarghatta Main Road, Bangalore. SCE is affiliated with Visvesvaraya Technological University, Belgaum and approved by the All India Council for Technical Education.

Sapthagiri College of Engineering maintains and creates an enabling learning environment for the students. It offers civil engineering, mechanical engineering, information science & engineering, biotechnology, electrical & electronics engineering, computer science & engineering, and electronics & communications engineering courses.

== Courses offered ==
=== Undergraduate ===
- Biotechnology
- Civil Engineering
- Computer Science & Engineering
- Information Science & Engineering
- Electronics & Communications Engineering
- Electrical and Electronics Engineering and
- Mechanical Engineering

=== Postgraduate ===
- Computer Science & Engineering
- VLSI design & Embedded system.

=== Research centers ===
- Biotechnology
- Chemistry
- Physics
- Computer Science & Engineering
- Electronics & Communications Engineering
- Mechanical Engineering
