= Basaveshvara Engineering College =

Private engineering college in Karnataka, India

Basaveshwara Engineering College (Autonomous), Bagalkot
- Motto: Quality Technical Education through Innovation
- Type: Autonomous
- Established: 1963
- Affiliations: VTU
- President: Kshitij Badachi
- Location: Karnataka, India; 16°10′25.3″N 75°39′25.9″E
- Campus: Urban, 150 acres (610,000 m^{2}), 5 km from Bagalkot city on Raichur-Belgaum Road
- Accreditation: AICTE, NBA

Basaveshwara Engineering College (BEC), is a private co-educational engineering college in Bagalkot, Karnataka, India.

In 2024, a hackathon was held in the college.
