= Reva Institute of Technology and Management =

REVA Institute of Technology and Management
- ರೇವ ತಾಂತ್ರಿಕ ಮಹಾವಿದ್ಯಾಲಯ
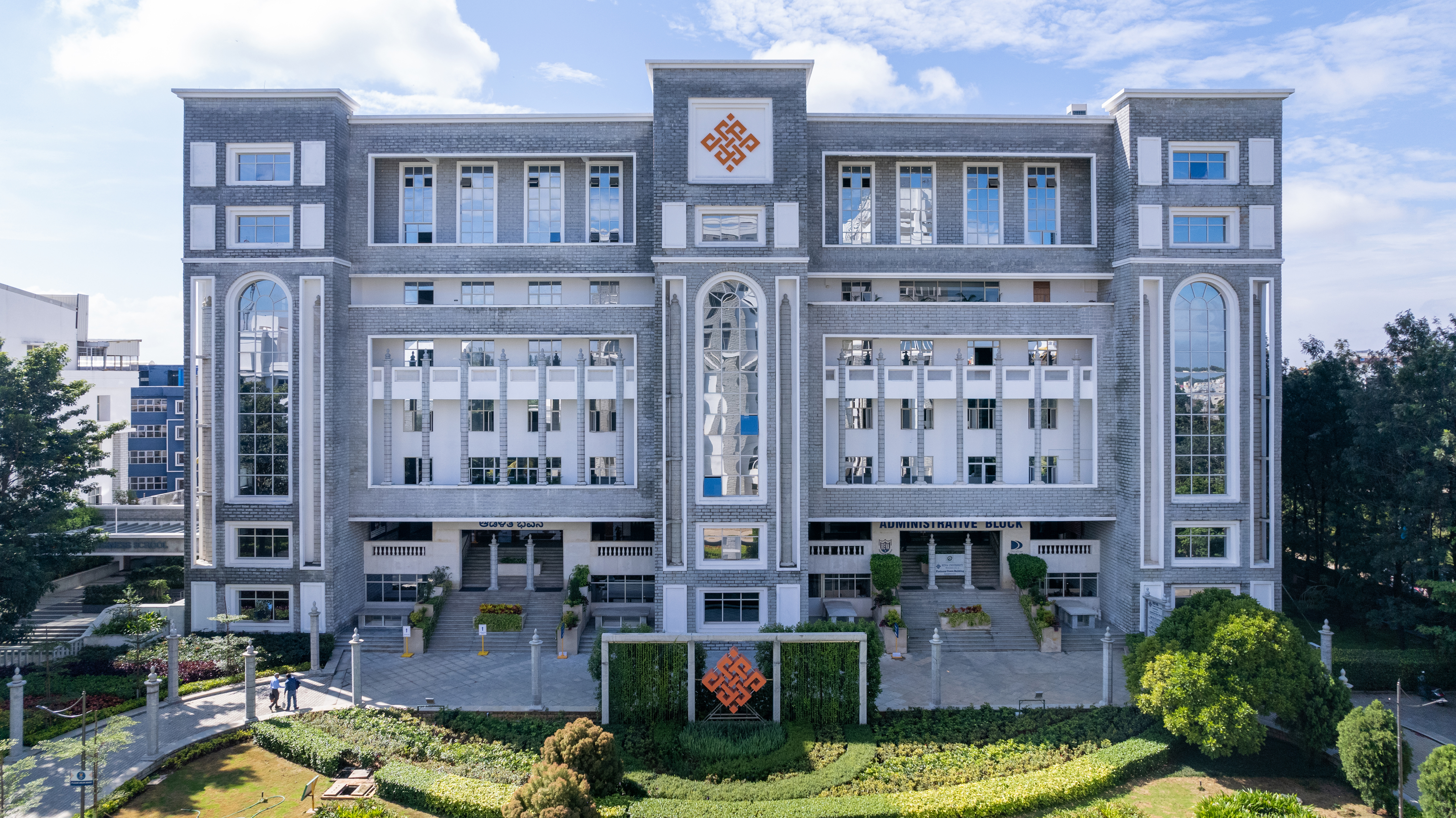
- Motto: Knowledge is Power
- Type: University co-educational
- Affiliations: AICTE UGC BCI COA Accredited by NAAC
- Chancellor: Dr. P. Shyama Raju
- Vice-Chancellor: M Dhanamjaya
- Academic staff: 800
- Undergraduates: ~11000
- Postgraduates: ~4000
- Location: Bangalore, Karnataka, India; 13°07′00.6″N 77°38′10.5″E
- Campus: Urban, 43 acres (170,000 m^{2}), 21.8 km from Bangalore city in Kattigenahalli, Yelahanka.
- Colors: Orange

Reva Institute of Technology and Management (Kannada: ರೇವ ತಾಂತ್ರಿಕ ಮಹಾವಿದ್ಯಾಲಯ) is a private state University located in Bangalore, Karnataka. REVA Group of Educational Institutions was established in 2002, managed by Rukmini Educational Charitable Trust. In 2004 it was taken over by Rukmini Educational Charitable Trust led by Dr. P. Shyama Raju. REVA University was established in 2004 as an educational venture by Divyasree Developers.

REVA is built on a campus of about 45 acres (18 ha) in North Bangalore and is a technical education center approved by the All India Council for Technical Education (AICTE).

== Academic units and programs ==
REVA offers undergraduate courses and Bachelor of Engineering programmes in six disciplines and postgraduate programmes.

Course	Type of Course
Bachelor of Technology in Civil Engineering	Undergraduate
Bachelor of Technology In Computer Science And Engineering	Undergraduate
Bachelor of Technology in Electrical And Electronics Engineering	Undergraduate
Bachelor of Technology in Electronics and Communication Engineering	Undergraduate
Bachelor of Technology in Mechanical Engineering	Undergraduate
Master of Business Administration	Post-graduate
Master of Computer Applications	Post-graduate
Master of Technology in Computer Science and Engineering	Post-graduate
Master of Technology in Computer Network Engineering	Post-graduate
Master of Technology in Computer Network Engineering (Part-time, VTU Extn. Center)	Post-graduate
Master of Technology in Digital Communication and Networking	Post-graduate
Master of Technology in Power Electronics	Post-graduate
Master of Technology in Signal Processing	Post-graduate
Master of Technology in Structural Engineering	Post-graduate
Master of Technology in Transportation Engineering	Post-graduate
Master of Technology in VLSI and Embedded Systems	Post-graduate
Master of Technology in VLSI and Embedded Systems (Part-time, VTU Extn. Center)	Post-graduate

Extension center in REVA which offers two part-time postgraduate courses: M.Tech in VLSI Design and Embedded Systems and M.Tech in Computer Network Engineering.

== Placements ==
The Training & Placement (T&P) department is primarily a liaison between industry and the institute to assist graduates with job placement. The Institute reported the following placement statistics.
