= Nidasoshi =

- Village
- Location in Karnataka, India Nidasoshi (India)
- Coordinates: 16.29°N 74.60°E
- Country: India
- State: Karnataka
- District: Belgaum
- Talukas: Hukeri

Government
  - Type: Panchayat raj

Population (2001)
  - Total: 6,886

Languages
  - Official: Kannada
- Time zone: UTC+5:30 (IST)
- ISO 3166 code: IN-KA

Nidasoshi is a village in the northern state of Karnataka, India. It is located in the Hukeri taluk of Belgaum district in Karnataka.

== Demographics ==
At the 2001 India census, Nidasoshi had a population of 6886 with 3801 males and 3085 females.

== See also ==
- Belgaum
- Districts of Karnataka
