= Visvesvaraya Technological University =

State University in Karnataka, India

- Former name: Visveswaraiah Technological University
- Motto: Modalu manavanagu
- Motto in English: Above all, be human
- Type: Public
- Established: 1 April 1998; 28 years ago
- Academic affiliations: UGC, AICTE, ACU, AIU
- Chancellor: Governor of Karnataka
- Vice-Chancellor: Dr. S. Vidyashankar
- Students: 85,715
- Undergraduates: 72,888
- Postgraduates: 12,248
- Doctoral students: 579
- Location: Belagavi, Karnataka, Karnataka, India; 15°46′43.72″N 74°27′43.53″E
- Campus: 378 acres (153 ha); Semi-Urban
- Language: English, Kannada
- Colours: Orange, white, green
- Nickname: VTU
- Website: vtu.ac.in

Visvesvaraya Technological University (VTU) is a collegiate public state university in Belagavi, Karnataka established by the Government of Karnataka. It came into existence in the year 1998. The university is named after Sir M. Visvesvaraya, an Indian civil engineer, statesman and the 19th Diwan of Mysore.

== History ==
Visvesvaraya Technological University (VTU) was established by the Government of Karnataka on 1 April 1998 with its headquarters at Belagavi, as per the provisions of the Visvesvaraya Technological University Act, 1994, an Act to establish and incorporate a university in the State of Karnataka for the development of engineering, technology and allied sciences. For effective administration, four regional offices at the four revenue divisional headquarters, namely, Belagavi, Bangalore, Mysore and Gulbarga were established. VTU was established by the Government in order to promote planned and sustainable development of technical education consistent with state and national policies and bringing various colleges affiliated earlier to different universities, with different syllabi, different procedures and different traditions under one umbrella.

== Campus ==
According to the stipulations outlined in the VTU Act of 1994, the university is situated in Belagavi, Karnataka, with its main administrative center known as "Jnana Sangama," meaning "The Confluence Of Knowledge".

Additionally, the university has three regional centres in Bangalore, Kalaburagi and Mysore. Visvesvaraya Institute of Advanced Technology, also known as VIAT, is a research institute being constructed near Bangalore, Karnataka.

VTU Campuses
| Campus | Address | Type | Campus Area |
|---|---|---|---|
| VTU Main Campus - Belagavi | Jnana Sangama, Machhe, Belagavi - 590018 | Semi-Urban | 120 acres (0.49 km^{2}) |
| VTU Regional Center - Bangalore | RHCS Layout, Annapoorneshwarinagar, Nagarbhavi, Bangalore - 560091. | Urban | 1 acre (0.0040 km^{2}) |
| VTU Regional Center - Mysore | Hanchya Sathagally Layout, Ring Road, Mysore - 570019. | Urban | 42 acres (0.17 km^{2}) |
| VTU Regional Center - Gulbarga | Rajapura, Kusnoor Road, Gulbarga - 585106 | Urban | 15 acres (0.061 km^{2}) |
| Visvesvaraya Institute of Advanced Technology (VIAT) | Muddenahalli, Singadikadirenahalli - 562103 | Rural | 200 acres (0.81 km^{2}) |

The university also has 13 Quality Improvement Programme (QIP) centers in various affiliated colleges and 16 extension centers for offering postgraduate programs. It has around 2,305 departments recognised as research centres which are spread across its affiliated institutions in Karnataka. The Jnana Sangama, Belagavi campus and the regional and extension centres of VTU at Bangalore, Davangere, Gulbarga and Mysore offer M.Tech, MBA, MCA and PhD programs.

== Academics ==
=== Academic programmes ===
VTU offers undergraduate engineering programs that award a Bachelor of Engineering (BE) or Bachelor of Technology (BTech) degree. The university offers postgraduate programs that lead to Master of Technology (MTech), Master of Architecture (MArch) Master of Science (MSc) by research, Master of Business Administration (MBA), Master of Computer Applications (MCA) and doctorate (PhD). The MSc and PhD are research degrees while the rest are taught degrees.

==== Undergraduate courses ====
The university has 12 undergraduate boards which offer Bachelor of Engineering (B.E.) programs and one undergraduate board which offers Bachelor of Architecture (BArch) course:

| Board | Undergraduate courses in English medium |
|---|---|
| Architecture^{‡} | Architecture |
| Automobile Engineering | Automobile Engineering |
| Biotechnology | Bio-technology |
| Civil Engineering | Ceramics & Cement Technology, Civil Engineering, Environmental Engineering |
| Chemical / Polymer Engineering | Chemical Engineering, Silk Technology, Textile Technology, Polymer Science & Technology |
| CSE / ISE | Computer Science & Engineering and Information Science & Engineering |
| AI & ML | Artificial Intelligence and Machine Learning Engineering |
| Electrical Engineering | Electrical & Electronics Engineering |
| Electronics & Communication Engineering | Electronics & Communication Engineering, Telecommunication Engineering |
| IPE / IEM / MA | Industrial & Production Engineering, Industrial Engineering & Management, Manufacturing Science & Engineering |
| IT / BM / ML | Biomedical Engineering, Instrumentation Technology, Medical Electronics |
| Mechanical Engineering | Aeronautical Engineering, Mechanical Engineering, Mining Engineering, Precision Engineering, Printing Technology, Tool Engineering |
| Mechatronics Engineering | Mechatronics Engineering |

^{‡} The Architecture board offers the BArch course.

==== Postgraduate courses ====
The university has 11 postgraduate boards which offer Master of Technology (M.Tech.) programs:

| Board | Postgraduate programs in English medium |
|---|---|
| Civil Engineering | Computer Aided Design of Structure, Construction Technology, Environmental Engineering, Geo-Informatics, Highway Technology, Structural Engineering, Transportation Engineering And Management, Infrastructure construction and management. |
| Chemical Engineering | Chemical Engineering |
| Computer Science and Engineering | Computer Engineering, Computer Network Engineering, Computer Science and Engineering, Information Technology, Software Engineering |
| Electrical Engineering | Computer Applications in Industrial Drives (ECD), Energy Systems & Management (EEM), Control Systems (CS), Power Electronics (EPE), Power Systems Engineering (EPS) |
| Electronics & Communication Engineering | Digital Communication Engineering, Digital Communication & Networking, Digital Electronics, Digital Electronics & Communication, Digital Electronics & Communication Systems, Electronics, Industrial Electronics, Information & Communication System, Network & Internet Engineering, VLSI Design & Embedded Systems, Signal Processing, Communication Systems, Intelligent Systems |
| IP Engineering | Manufacturing Science & Engineering (MSE), Master of Engineering Management (MEM), Product Design & Manufacturing (MPD), Production Engineering & System Technology (MPT), Production Engineering (MPE), Production Management (MPM), Production Technology (MPY) |
| IT Engineering | Biomedical Signal Processing & Instrumentation |
| MBA | Master Of Business Administration |
| MCA | Master of Computer Applications |
| Mechanical Engineering | Computational Analysis in Mechanical Sciences, M.Tech. in Aeronautical Engineering (MAE), Industrial Automation and Robotics (MAR), Computer Integrated Manufacturing (MCM), Design Engineering (MDE), Engineering Analysis (MEA), Machine Design (MMD), Thermal Power (MTP), Tool Engineering (MTE) |
| Textile Technology | Textile Technology |

=== Admissions ===
The university offers admissions at undergraduate and postgraduate levels.

=== Scheme and syllabus ===
Visvesvaraya Technological University accomplished its primary task of setting a common syllabus across the state in 1998. The university regularly revises the syllabus keeping in view technology upgrades around the world. The syllabus has been updated in 2002, 2006, 2010, 2014, 2015, 2017, 2018 and 2021. VTU adopted a Choice Based Credit System (CBCS) for students admitted to the university from the academic year 2015–2016. The CBCS provides a choice for students to select from the prescribed courses (i.e. core, elective, foundation and mandatory non-credit courses). As part of the new CBCS scheme, VTU also moved to a Cumulative Grade Point Average (CGPA) grading system from the previous system of awarding percentage and class to students. VTU has also made an internship of eight weeks mandatory for undergraduate and postgraduate engineering students in affiliated colleges.

=== Grading ===
For students matriculating since the academic year 2015–2016, VTU adopts an absolute grading system wherein the marks are converted to grades, and every semester results are declared with a semester grade point average (SGPA) and a Cumulative Grade Point Average (CGPA). To obtain a degree, in addition to clearing all the subjects, a student must also obtain a minimum CGPA of five (5.0).

VTU Grade Points Scale
| Level | Outstanding | Excellent | Very Good | Good | Above Average | Average | Poor | Fail |
|---|---|---|---|---|---|---|---|---|
| Letter Grade | S+ | S | A | B | C | D | E | F |
| Grade Points | 10 | 9 | 8 | 7 | 6 | 5 | 4 | 0 |
| Score (Marks) Range (%) | ≥ 90 | < 90 ≥ 80 | < 80 ≥ 70 | < 70 ≥ 60 | < 60 ≥ 50 | < 50 ≥ 45 | < 45 ≥ 40 | < 40 |

Prior to the introduction of the Choice Based Credit System, students were awarded a percentage and a class, as defined:

- First class with distinction (FCD): Not less than 70% of the aggregate marks in first attempt
- First class (FC): Less than 70% but not less than 60% of the aggregate marks in first attempt
- Second class (SC): Less than 60% of the aggregate marks in first attempt

=== Collaborations ===
The university has signed MoUs with multinational corporations like IBM, Intel Asia Electronics Inc., Ingersoll-Rand (India) Ltd., Bangalore, Nokia, Bosch Rexroth and Microsoft to improve the industry interactions for students and teachers.

VTU is also a member of Association of Indian Universities and Association of Commonwealth Universities.

=== Rankings ===
The National Institutional Ranking Framework (NIRF) ranked it 52nd in the engineering ranking of 2023 and 69th in 2024.

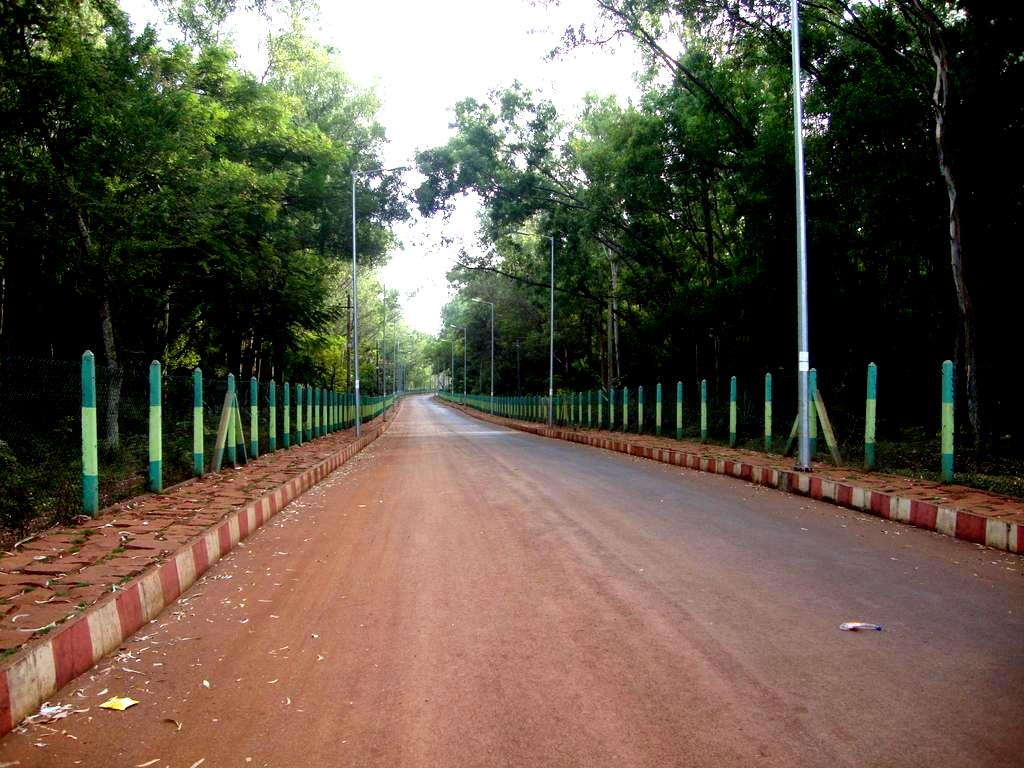
A boulevard at VTU campus

== Organisation and administration ==
=== Governance ===
VTU is administered by its Executive Council and Academic Senate whose members are selected from the academic community and government officials. The present chancellor is Sri Thawar Chand Gehlot, Governor of Karnataka state and the vice-chancellor is Dr. S. Vidyashankar.

=== Affiliated colleges ===
As of 2021, there are 219 colleges affiliated to the university (107 under Bangalore region, 34 under Belagavi region, 18 under Gulbarga region and 60 under Mysore region). The colleges are categorised as 'government', 'private-aided' and 'private-unaided' based on the type of funding. A few colleges may be classified as 'minority linguistic' and 'minority religious' based on the minority status of languages and religions. Further, these colleges are placed under 'autonomous' and 'non-autonomous' category of institutions granted by UGC. There are 25 autonomous colleges affiliated to VTU.

See List of colleges affiliated to Visvesvaraya Technological University

==== Examinations ====
Exams are conducted twice a year for all affiliated non-autonomous colleges. Odd semester exam is conducted during December and January. Results usually published in February. Even semester exams are conducted during May/June; and the VTU results are published in June/July.

=== Centres of excellence ===
The university has signed MoUs with international organisations (such as CANEUS International) and multinational corporations (like IBM, Intel Asia Electronics Inc., Ingersoll-Rand (India) Ltd., Bangalore, Nokia, Bosch Rexroth and Microsoft) and has set up centres of excellence.

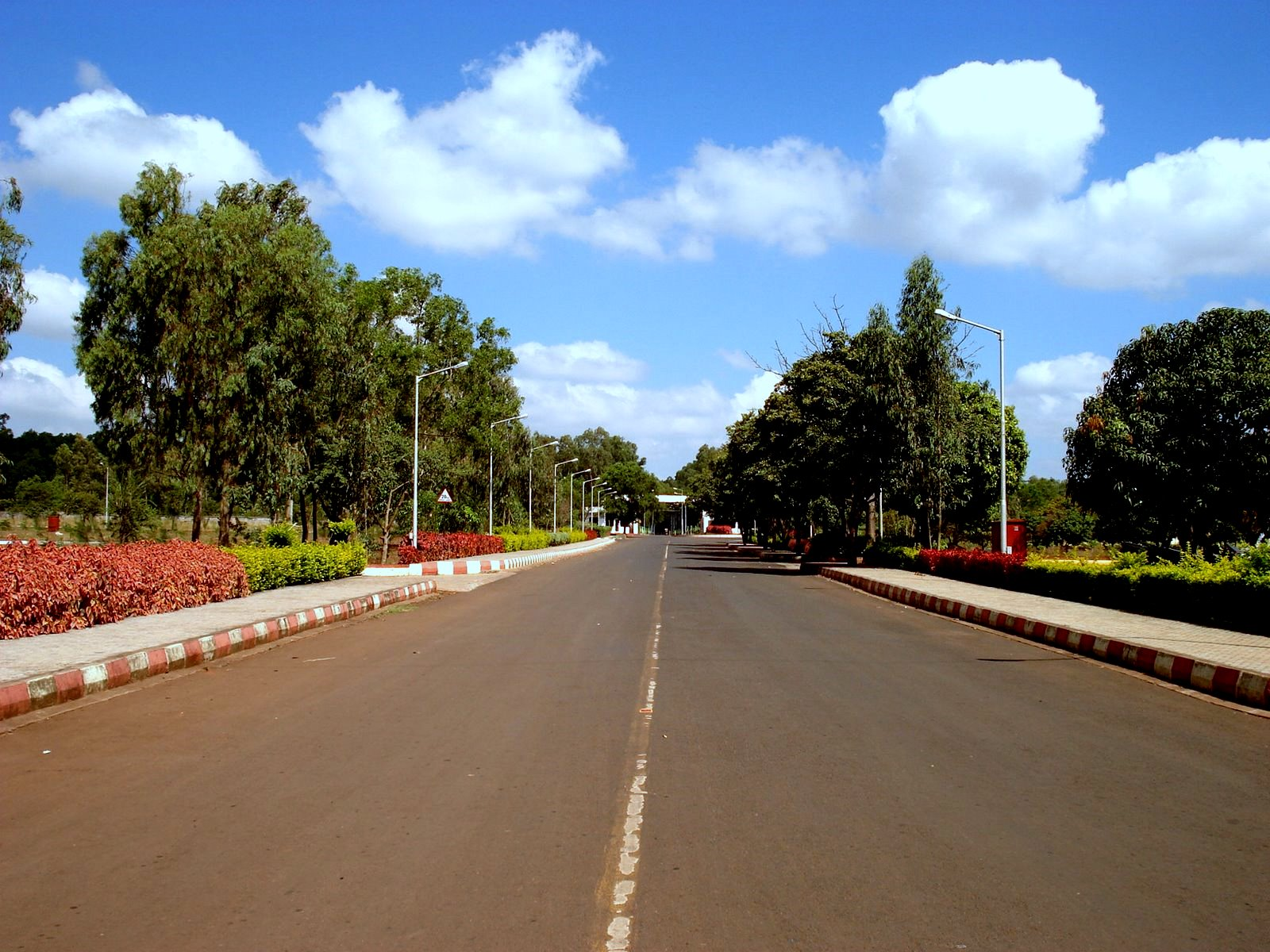
A road in VTU campus

=== Visvesvaraya Institute of Advanced Technology ===
Visvesvaraya Institute of Advanced Technology (VIAT) is a research institute being constructed in Bangalore, Karnataka. The institute is on 200 acres (0.81 km^{2}) of land near Nandi Hills and is expected to cost 600 crores. In the initial years, VIAT will focus on research in embedded technology, software quality, agricultural engineering and bioengineering. Each department will function as a 'discovery-innovation centre.' The institute will offer graduate and PhD programs in the sciences.

== Student life ==
=== VTU Fest ===
The university annually organises an inter-collegiate cultural-fest "Yuvostava" which sees participants from all across India.

From 2024, VTU has also decided to organise, a tech fest "YUKTI 2K24". The event aims to showcase the innovation and inspiration of students & tech enthusiasts in various fields, such as technical, management, music, dance, entertainment, and artistic. The event also featured a paper presentation competition, where participants could submit their original research papers on topics related to technology and society.

== Notable alumni ==
Visvesvaraya Technological University (VTU) has produced many notable alumni who have made significant contributions to their respective fields. Some of the most prominent alumni include:

1. Sudha Murthy: Chairperson of the Infosys Foundation and author of several books.

2. Rajeev Chandrasekhar: Member of Parliament, Rajya Sabha and founder of BPL Mobile Communications.

3. Narayana Murthy: Indian billionaire businessman and co-founders of Infosys.

4. Anil Kumble: Former captain of the Indian cricket team and a renowned cricket commentator.

5. Balen Shah: Prime Minister of Nepal. Former mayor of Kathmandu, and a Nepalese rapper, music composer, poet, structural engineer and politician.

6. Sunil Lamsal: Minister of Physical Infrastructure and Transport and Minister of Urban Development of Nepal.

7. Krishna Nayaka: Member of the Karnataka Legislative Assembly of Hadagali Assembly constituency.

8. Daiaphi Lamare: she received widespread recognition in the Indian film industry for her contribution in film soundtracks of Lokah Chapter 1: Chandra, and Dhurandhar.

== Vice-Chancellors ==
| No. | From | To | Name | Position previously held |
|---|---|---|---|---|
| 1 | 1 April 1998 | 30 March 2001 | Dr. S. Rajashekharaiah | Principal, Basaveshvara Engineering College, Bagalkot |
| 2 | 1 April 2001 | 30 June 2007 | Dr. K. Balaveera Reddy | Professor, Department of Mechanical Engineering, National Institute of Technology Karnataka, Surathkal |
| 3 | 1 July 2007 | 30 June 2010 | Dr. H. P. Khincha | Chairman, Division of Electrical Sciences, Indian Institute of Science, Bangalore |
| 4 | 1 July 2010 | 14 March 2016 | Dr. H. Maheshappa | Principal, Cambridge Institute of Technology, Bangalore |
| 5 | March 2016 | May 2016 | Dr. Shekarappa A H G (In-Charge Vice Chancellor) | Principal, Sheik College of Engineering, Belagavi |
| 6 | 5 May 2016 | Sep 2016 | Dr. V. Sridhar (In-Charge Vice Chancellor) | Principal, P.E.S College of Engineering, Mandya |
| 7 | Sep 2016 | Sep 2022 | Prof. Karisiddappa | Principal, Government Engineering College, Hassan |
| 8 | Sept 2022 | Present | Dr. Vidyashankar | VC, KSOU |

== See also ==
- List of colleges affiliated to Visvesvaraya Technological University
- Visvesvaraya Institute of Advanced Technology
