= Fels =

Fels is a surname. Notable people with the surname include:

- Allan Fels (born 1942), Australian economist, lawyer and public servant
- Anthony Fels (born 1964), Australian politician
- Edmond de Fels (1858–1951), French diplomat, writer and historian
- Florent Fels (1891–1977), French journalist, publisher and author
- Joseph Fels (1853–1914), American soap manufacturer and philanthropist
- Laurent Fels, Luxembourg writer and high school teacher
- Mary Fels (1863–1953), German-born, American philanthropist, suffragist, Georgist; wife of Joseph
- Samuel Simeon Fels (1860–1950), American businessman and philanthropist
- Willi Fels (1858–1946), New Zealand merchant, collector and philanthropist

== See also ==
- Joseph Fels Barnes (1907–1970), American journalist
- Adler Fels, California winery based in Sonoma
- Der Fels, group of German Expressionist artists around 1920 to 1927
- Der fließende Fels, German television series
- Hohle Fels, cave in the Swabian Jura of Germany with Upper Paleolithic finds
- Fels-Naptha, American brand of bar laundry soap
- Fels Formation, geologic formation in Austria
- Fels Institute of Government, University of Pennsylvania
- Fels am Wagram, municipality in the district of Tulln in Lower Austria
