= Mary Fels =

German-born American philanthropist and suffragist

Mary (Fels) Fels
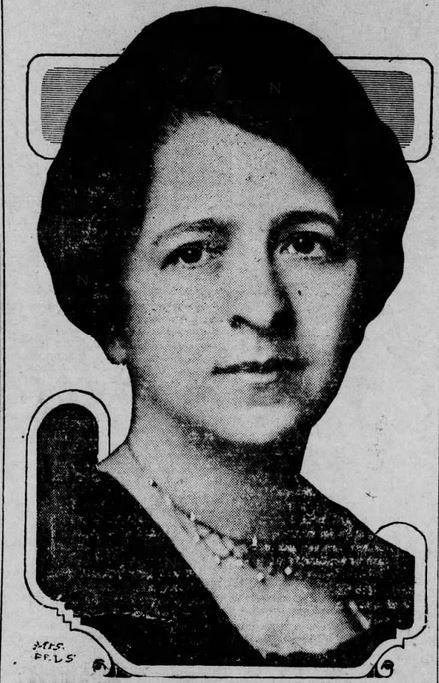
- Fels in 1915
- Born: March 10, 1863; Sembach, Bavaria, Germany
- Died: May 16, 1953 (aged 90); Manhattan, New York City, U.S.
- Other name: Mollie Fels
- Occupations: philanthropist; Georgist; Zionist; suffragist; economist; author; editor
- Spouse: Joseph Fels
- Children: 1
- Parents: Elias Fels; Fanny (Rothschild) Fels

Mary Fels (née Fels; March 10, 1863 - May 16, 1953) was a German-born American philanthropist, Georgist, Zionist, suffragist, economist, author, and journal editor. She was interested in all the different movements that supported democracy. She was an ardent supporter of equal suffrage, and was active in the promotion of Israel. Though she supported and encouraged her husband, Joseph Fels, in his campaign for economic justice, it was not until after his death that Mrs. Fels became active in the single tax movement. She established and supervised the Joseph Fels International Commission, which included welfare funds.

== Early life and education ==
Mary (or Mollie) (Note: Various sources refer to her given name as "Mary" or "Mollie". It is possible that her original legal given name was "Mollie", later changed to "Mary"; or "Mollie" was a nickname.) Fels was born in Sembach, Bavaria, Germany, March 10, 1863. Her parents were Elias Fels (1824–1898) and Fanny Rothschild Fels (1826–1888). Elias Fels was industrious and far from rich. There were several boys and half a dozen girls in the family, Mary being the youngest.

At the age of five, Fels had taken an unaccountable hatred of the German alphabet, which she refused to learn. In 1869, the family emigrated to the U.S., settling in the vicinity of Keokuk, Iowa. She was brought up in an Orthodox Jewish home.

When Fels was nine years old, a 19 year old soap peddler, Joseph Fels, later the founder of the Fels-Naptha soap brand, arrived in her neighborhood. Joseph heard that a family with the same surname as his, Fels, lived in the vicinity, and upon visiting them, found that the head of the family was a distant relative of his father. Joseph saw the young Mary and was smitten. He said he would go away, make his fortune, and come back and marry her some day.

Fels was 16 when she graduated from the Keokuk high school, 1879; and in 1880, she studied at Saint Mary's College of Notre Dame, Indiana. She also attended University of Pennsylvania for one year and completed special courses at Bedford College, London, England.

== Career ==
She married Joseph in the Fall of 1881, and they began a career which took them all over the world. Their only child, Irvin, died at the age of six months, in 1883. In 1886, when the Russian Jews reach the U.S., destitute and helpless, she began her public activities. She also worked alongside her husband in his plans for the betterment of the poor. Some believed that Mrs. Fels was the abler financier and planner of the two, but certainly, she was always at her husband's side with advice and encouragement."

After she was widowed in February 1914, Fels took up the burden of the couple's wealth, and her husband's theories and charities. In May, Fels attended the National American Woman Suffrage Association's (NAWSA) annual conference in Nashville, Tennessee. In December of that year, at a meeting of the "Single Tax League of St. Louis", Fels told the audience,— "The single tax movement ... is like woman suffrage - it is bound to come."

Fels condemned all sorts of special privilege, including those forms by which the fortune of her husband had been amassed—the patent monopoly, land monopoly, and tariff protection monopoly—all of which contributed to the making of the Fels fortune. When her husband was alive, he had been trying to set business and industry free from the tolls of monopoly and the tribute exacted by special privilege. Mrs. Fels continued with this work. Having been in fullest sympathy with her husband's campaign for economic justice, Fels' philanthropy continued on the same plan. For every dollar given by another in the U.S., England, France, Spain, Denmark, and Australia, for the bringing into realization of a single tax state, she would be the largest contributor to the propagation of the economic ideology of Henry George in the world.

In 1916, Fels proposed a gift to the Zionists of a single tax colony in Palestine at an estimated cost of nearly US$1,000,000. (Note: US$1,000,000 in 1916 is equivalent to about US$25,793,394 in 2022.)

She effected the creation of school gardens, and was a pioneer in the farm colony movement to cope with unemployment and to bring people back to land. She adopted work in prisons as part of a program of prison reform movement. Fels created numerous endownments for Palestine institutions and was active for many years in the rebuilding of Palestine, visiting the Holy Land and personally supervising her work there. She incorporated the Joseph Fels Foundation, Inc. of New York in 1925 to utilize the fortune left by her husband. The foundation, of which she was the president, was created to work towards the "Jewish resettlement and nonpolitical reorganization of Palestine"; for "enlightenment in the field of land taxation and general taxation"; and for "in general, the awakening of religious and spiritual thought, the furtherance of improved economic conditions, and the promotion of human betterment".

Joseph Fels; his life-work, 1916

Fels published two books, the biography, Joseph Fels: His Life-work (B. W. Huebsch, New York, 1916) and a religious work, Toward the Light (George Dobsevage, New York, 1927). From 1917 to 1919, she was the editor of The Public: A Journal of Democracy.

== Personal life ==
Fels had homes in Philadelphia and London, England. She died at her Manhattan home on West 80th Street in New York City, May 16, 1953.

== Selected works ==
- Joseph Fels: His Life-work (B. W. Huebsch, New York, 1916) (Text)
- Toward the Light (George Dobsevage, New York, 1927)
