= List of Penn State academic buildings =

The following is a list of academic buildings in the Pennsylvania State University system:

== University Park ==
=== Ag Hill area ===
- Agricultural Engineering Building
- Agricultural Sciences and Industries Building
- Animal, Veterinary, and Biomedical Sciences
- Berkey Creamery
- Business Building
- Food Science Building
- Forest Resources Building
- Headhouse Buildings I-III
- Lewis Katz Building
- McCoy Natatorium
- Tyson Building

=== Allen Road area ===
- CEDAR Building
- Chambers Building
- Ford Building
- Moore Building
- Music Building I
- Music Building II
- Rackley Building
- Susan Welch Liberal Arts Building

=== College of Science area ===
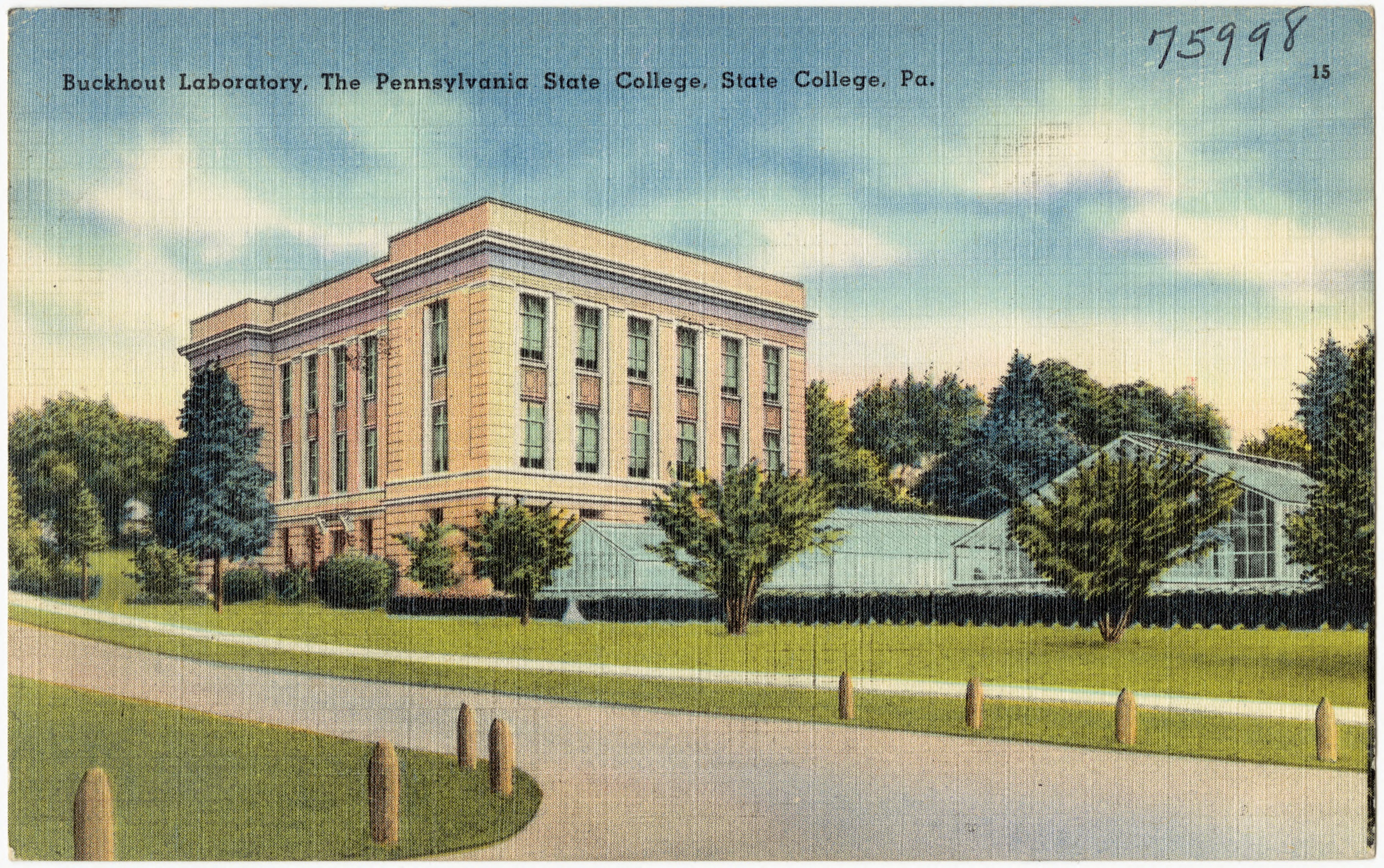
Buckhout Laboratory at Pennsylvania State University's main campus

- Althouse Laboratory
- Boucke Building
- Buckhout Laboratory
- Chemical & Biomedical Engineering Building (CBEB)
- Benkovic Building
- Davey Laboratory
- Frear North Building
- Frear South Building
- Life Sciences Building
- Mueller Laboratory
- Osmond Laboratory
- Ritenour Building
- Thomas Building
- Wartik Laboratory
- Whitmore Laboratory

=== EMS and Engineering East area ===
- Deike Building
- Electrical Engineering East Building
- Electrical Engineering West Building
- Hammond Building
- Hosler Building
- Reber Building
- Sackett Building
- Steidle Building
- Willard Building

=== EMS and Engineering West area ===
North side view of the Information Sciences and Technology Building at the main campus

- Applied Research Laboratory
- Applied Science Building
- Earth-Engineering Sciences Building
- Hallowell Building
- Leonhard Building
- Westgate Building
- Research West Building
- Walker Building

=== Hastings Road area ===
- Academic Activities Building
- Energy and the Environment Laboratory
- Pegula Ice Arena
- Research East Building

=== HUB-Robeson Center area ===
- Grange Building
- Health and Human Development Building
- Henderson Building
- McAllister Building
- White Building
- Biobehavioral Health Building

=== Innovation Park area ===
- Lubert Building
- Outreach Innovation Building

=== Intramural Building area ===
- Intramural Building
- Shields Building
- Wagner Building

=== Nittany Lion Inn area ===
- Biomechanics Laboratory
- Carpenter Building
- Keller Building
- Kern Building
- Mateer Building

=== Palmer Museum of Art area ===
- Armsby Building
- Arts Cottage
- Borland Building
- Ferguson Building
- Forum Building
- Patterson Building
- Pavilion Theatre
- Stuckeman Family Building
- Visual Arts Building
- Weaver Building

=== Pattee Library area ===
- Burrowes Building
- Carnegie Building
- Chandlee Laboratory
- Old Botany Building
- Pond Laboratory
- Sparks Building

=== Rec Hall area ===
- Noll Laboratory
- Rec Hall

== Commonwealth campuses ==
This portion of the list excludes those buildings in which an insignificant number of courses are held or those buildings that have an obvious use other than that of academics, such as libraries, administration buildings, and student centers.

=== Abington ===
- Sutherland Hall
- Lares Building
- Rydal Building
- Conference Center
- Spring House
- Woodland Building
- Athletic Building
- Cloverly Building

=== Altoona ===
- Cypress Building
- Force Advanced Technology Center
- Hawthorn Building
- Holtzinger Engineering Building
- Science Building
- Smith Building

=== Beaver ===
- General Classroom Building
- Laboratory Classroom Building
- Michael Baker Jr. Building

=== Berks ===
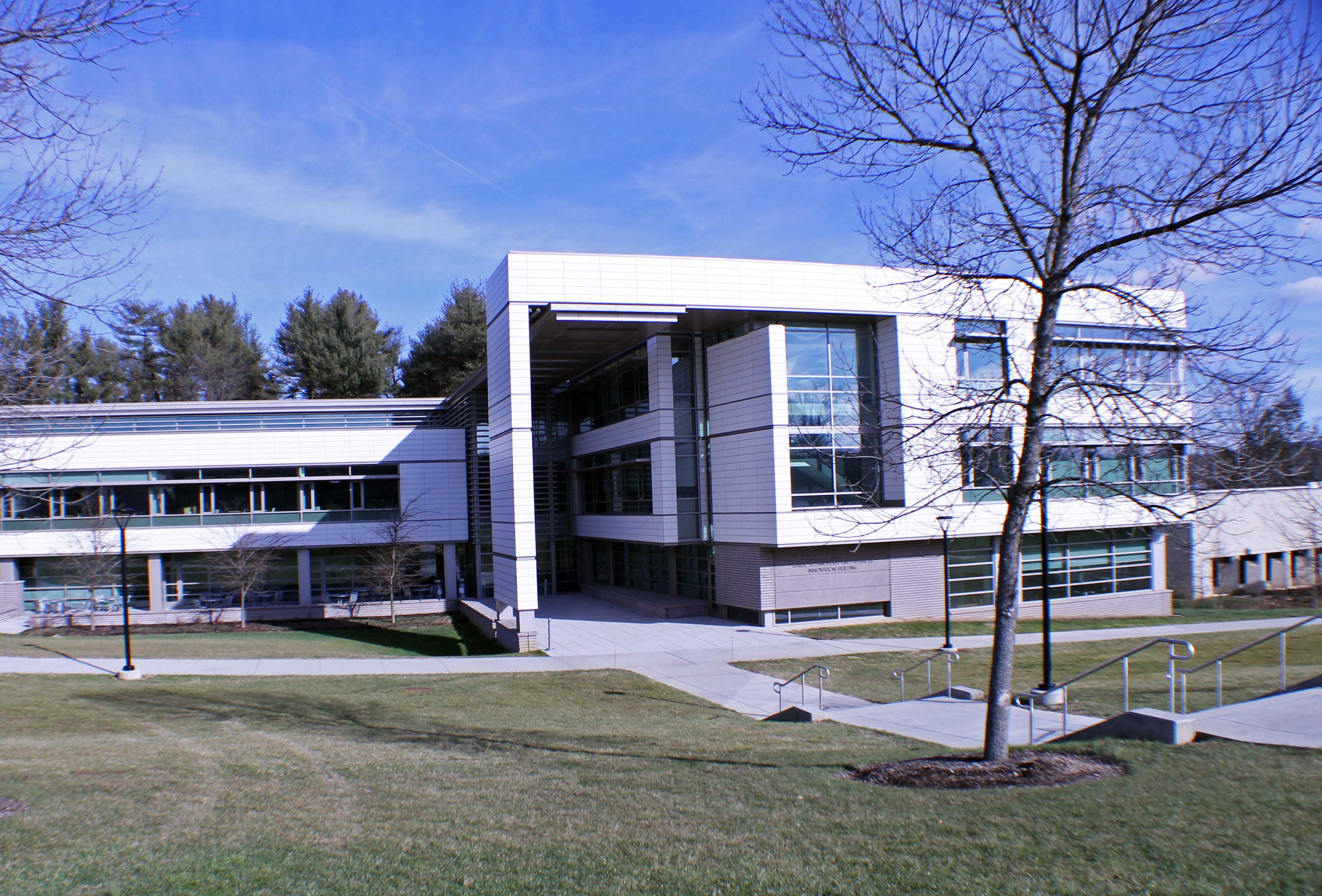
Gaige Technology and Innovation Center, the latest building at Penn State Berks in Spring Township

- Beaver Community Center
- Boscov-Lakin Information Commons
- Franco Building
- Luerssen Building
- Perkins Student Center
- Gaige Technology and Business Innovation Building

=== Brandywine ===
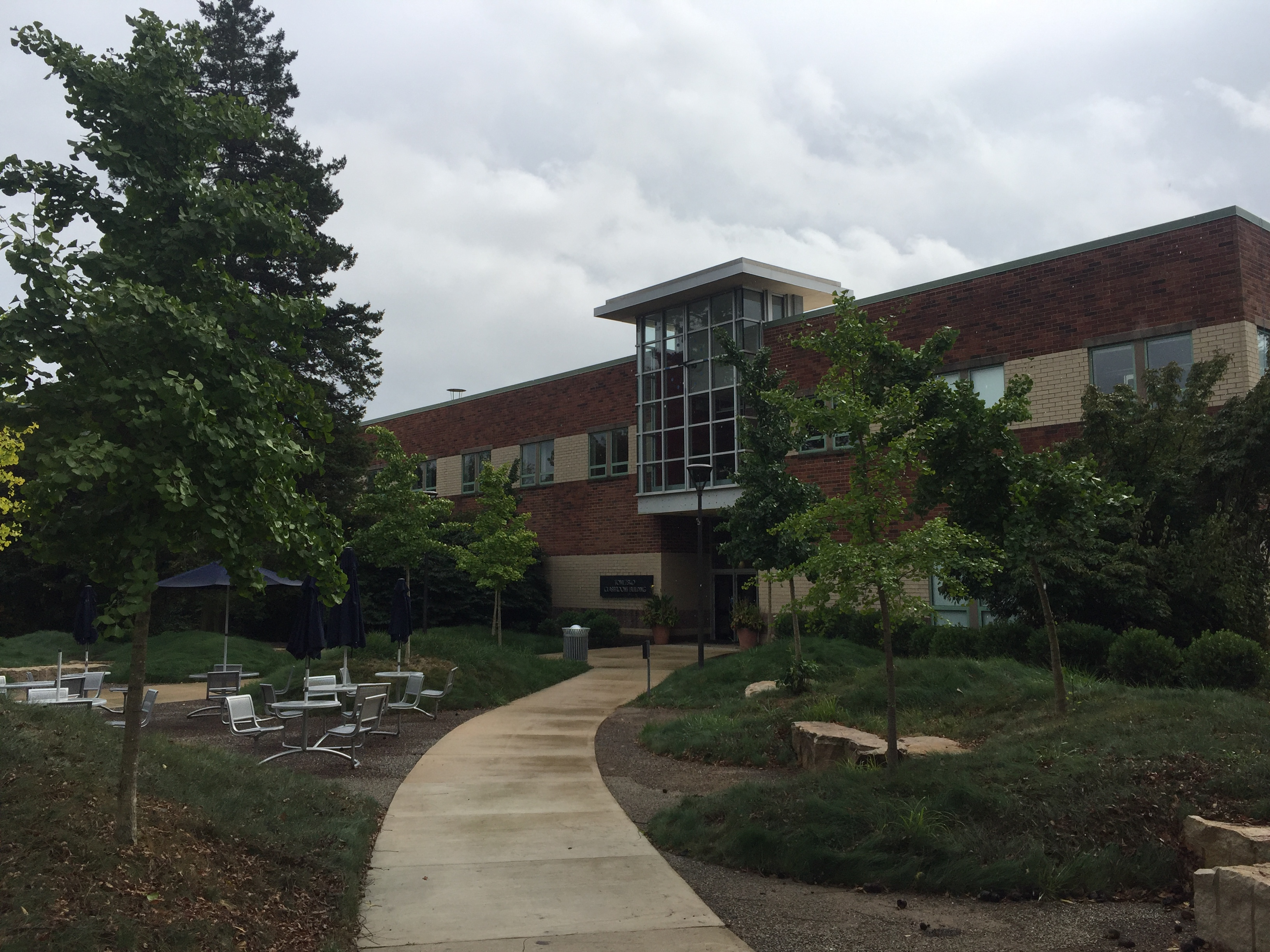
The Tomezko Building at Penn State Brandywine

- Commons Building / Athletic Center
- Main Building
- Orchard Hall
- Tomezsko Classroom Building
- John D. Vairo Building
- Student Union Building

=== DuBois ===
- DEF Technology Center
- Multipurpose Building
- Smeal Building
- Swift Building

=== Erie ===
- Jack Burke Research & Economic Development Center
- Kochel Center
- Nick Building
- Otto Behrend Science Building

=== Fayette ===
- Biomedical Building
- Eberly Building
- Engineering Building
- Williams Building

=== Greater Allegheny ===
- Crawford Building
- Fitness and Cultural Center (FCC)
- Kelly Library
- Frable Building
- Main Building
- Ostermayer Laboratory

=== Great Valley ===
- Main building
- The Conference Center at Penn State Great Valley (formerly known as the Safeguard Scientifics Building prior to 2010)

=== Harrisburg ===
- Capital Union Building
- Educational Activities Building
- Engineering Technology Laboratory
- Library
- Olmsted Building
- Science and Technology Building
- Student Enrichment Center
- Swatara Building

=== Hazleton ===
- Butler Learning Center
- Graham Academic Building
- Kostos Building
- Memorial Building
- Physical Education Building

=== Lehigh Valley ===
- Academic Building
- Corporate Learning Center
- Modular Building

=== Mont Alto ===
- General Studies Building
- Science & Technology Center

=== New Kensington ===
- Activities Building
- Blissell Center
- Conference Center
- Engineering Building
- Science and Technology Building
- Science Building

=== Schuylkill ===
- Classroom Building
- Multipurpose Building

=== Shenango ===
Lecture Hall, the oldest structure at Penn State Shenango

- Forker Laboratory
- Lecture Hall
- Physical Therapy Building
- Science Building
- Sharon Hall

=== Wilkes-Barre ===
- Athletics & Recreation Building
- Nesbitt Academic Commons
- Science Building
- Technology Center

=== Worthington Scranton ===
- Business Building
- Dawson Building
- Gallagher Conference Center
- Student Learning Center

=== York ===
- Grumbacher IST Center
- Main Classroom Building
- Pullo Performing Arts Center
