= Zote =

Zote may refer to:

- Zote (soap), a laundry soap brand
- Zote (village), a village in Mizoram, India
- Zote the Mighty, a character in the video game Hollow Knight
