= Oak Lane Day School =

Location
- 137 Stenton Avenue, Blue Bell, Pennsylvania; 40.1293°N 75.2579°W

Information
- Type: Private
- Motto: Non Sibi Sed Aliis (Latin) English:'Not for Self but for Others
- Established: 1916
- Closed: 2010
- Grades: Prekindergarten – 6th grade
- Enrollment: 100 students

Oak Lane Day School, located in Blue Bell, Pennsylvania, was an independent school founded in 1916 which served preschool and elementary-aged children, which also operated an eight-week children's camp program in the summer. The school's stated mission was to honor each child's individuality in a setting that fostered intellectual, creative, academic and personal growth. Oak Lane placed an emphasis on art and art history, music, and drama. Also included in its academic curriculum were language arts (reading and writing), math, physical education, science and social studies. From 1965 until closure in June 2010, the school's 30-acre (12 ha) country-like campus included a stream, pond, woods, meadows, specimen trees and animal life of all kind which supported environmental studies.

== Heads of the school ==
Tenure	Head
1916–1921	Francis Marion Garver
1921–1927	Francis Mitchell Froelicher
1927–1931	William Burnlee Curry
1931–1934	Arthur Seybold
1934–1937	Dr. Joseph S. Butterweck
1937–1943	George Harvey Ivins
1943–1944	J. Conrad Seegers
1944–1945	Dr. N. Eldred Bingham
1945–1956	John H. Niemeyer
1956–1957	Lynn E. Brown, Jr.
1957–1958	Ruth Dolton Tomlinson
1958–1960	Marion Sacks
1960–1964	Mae Spang
1964–1967	Frederic W. Locke
1967–1969	Dr. Douglas Cameron MacDonald
1969–1970	Richard Tyre
1970–1986	Miriam Niebuhr
1986–1991	Karen M. Johnson
1991–1992	Betsy Berger
1992–1999	Peter F. Baily '64
1999–2009	Karl Welsh
2009–2010	Martha Platt

== History ==
Originally known as Oak Lane Country Day School, Oak Lane was established in 1916 and for 44 years was located in Cheltenham Township just north of Philadelphia on Oak Lane Road (not to be confused with a nearby but discontiguous Philadelphia street named Oak Lane). The school's founders used the model of the Progressive Education Movement to support a religiously, racially and economically diverse student population. Oak Lane's first head of school was Francis Marion Garver who later became director of the elementary division of the School of Education at the University of Pennsylvania. The first chairman of Oak Lane's board of trustees was Dr. Morris Jastrow, Jr., the great scholar of Middle East languages and librarian of the University of Pennsylvania. Other trustees included members of prominent Philadelphia families in the early 1900s: Milton Sloss; Jay F. Schamberg, M.D.; Jerome J. Rothschild; Maurice Fleisher; Samuel Simeon Fels; Albert M. Greenfield; Lessing J. Rosenwald; Joseph Snellenburg; Alice Fleisher Liveright; and Judge Horace Stern.

In 1921, Francis Mitchell Froelicher became headmaster. Froelicher came from the Park School of Baltimore that was founded in 1912 by his father, Professor Hans Froelicher of Goucher College. Professor Froelicher was one of the leaders of the Progressive Education movement in America and served as a consultant to Oak Lane's founders in 1915. Francis Froelicher was elected president of the Progressive Education Association of America while he was Oak Lane's headmaster, and upon his departure in 1927, he went on to found the Fountain Valley School of Colorado.

Progressive education was a movement begun in the late 19th century in reaction to the influence of the industrial revolution on education. The Oak Lane catalog of 1924 stated that the school "is a protest against a system of education which apparently considers that children can be properly educated by factory methods." It also explained that the school "is not experimental, but accepts and puts into practice the principles established by those working in the field of educational psychology."

The 1924 school catalog listed the following as members of Oak Lane's Advisory Board: Felix Adler, of the Ethical Culture School in New York; David Werner Amram, professor of law of the University of Pennsylvania; John Dewey, Professor of Philosophy at Columbia University; Frank Graves, New York State Commissioner of Education; Henry Holmes, Dean of the Graduate School of Education at Harvard University; Eugene Randolph Smith, former Headmaster of the Park School; and Ambrose Suhrie, Dean of the School of Education in Cleveland.

From 1927 to 1931, William Burnlee Curry, a native of England and graduate of Oxford University, was headmaster. He had previously taught at Bedales School, a progressive school in England, and brought to Oak Lane a large retinue of teachers, many of them family. His wife, Mrs. Curry, taught nursery school, her sister, Miss Magaret Isherwood, taught English, and another relative, Miss Dorothy Cowley, was the librarian. Curry later became head of Dartington Hall School, one of the early progressive schools in England. While at Oak Lane, Curry hired Boris Blai, who was a student of Auguste Rodin, to become the fine arts teacher. Blai went on to found Tyler School of Art in 1935. Blai took with him another Oak Lane art teacher, Furman Finck, who later in his career painted a portrait of President Eisenhower.

In 1927, Oak Lane became accredited with the Secondary School Commission of the Association of Colleges and Secondary Schools of the Middle States and Maryland. Oak Lane also became recognized by the Department of Public Instruction of the Commonwealth of Pennsylvania.

In 1929, funds provided by Mr. and Mrs. Leopold Stokowski, world-renowned orchestra conductor and Oak Lane parents, allowed the construction of a nursery school wing. Architects George Howe and William Lescaze were hired for this building project, which was the first of many under their new firm. Its "International Style" attracted worldwide acclaim. Many building concepts appropriate to young children were incorporated in its plans, such as smaller doorways and steps, cork flooring, special furniture and protected outdoor areas.

During the Depression, Oak Lane began to experience financial difficulties and diminishing enrollment which opened the door for Temple University to consider acquiring the school. Temple, on the lookout for opportunities to develop a laboratory-demonstration school, learned of Oak Lane's situation and it was not long before a merger between the two became official in April 1931. Oak Lane's new name, Oak Lane Country Day School of Temple University, confirmed this affiliation. Part of the agreement was the recognition of Oak Lane as an educational enterprise for the purpose of developing the best progressive method of education, and for use as an observation school to train teachers.

The Philadelphia Eagles held their pre-season camp at Oak Lane prior to the 1937 season.

Under John H. Niemeyer's eleven-year tenure from 1945 to 1956, Oak Lane became part of the School Affiliation Program of the American Friends Service Committee. An exchange of pen pal letters and group projects formed the base of the affiliation program between Oak Lane and La Maison d'Enfants de Sèvres, France, a school just outside Paris whose purpose was to help children orphaned during World War II or whose parents were no longer able to care for them. Members of the faculties of the two schools exchanged visits and gave the children an opportunity to help understand better the world in which they lived. In conjunction with this program, the 4th-6th grades at Oak Lane learned French, the language of their overseas friends. Niemeyer left Oak Lane to become President of Bank Street College in New York.

In June 1960, Temple University determined that it could no longer support Oak Lane Country Day School because of mounting debt and other issues, and the property on which it stood was sold to a developer. Now existing on its own merit due to the strength of trustees, faculty and parents, the school became incorporated as Oak Lane Day School and reconvened in the fall in a former public school building at Springhouse Lane and Easton Road in Glenside, Pennsylvania. Niemeyer served as Board of Trustees chair and school spokesman.

Proceedings were begun in 1963 to purchase a permanent site for the school on the former John Cadwalader estate in Whitpain Township, Pennsylvania. In 1964, ground was broken on the old apple orchard on the grounds of the estate for a building known as the Perch Hankin Classroom Building. In 1965, the School moved to its current location, and as much as possible, the existing structures and ground were utilized in a manner consistent with the school's educational philosophy. In 2002 and 2003, the Leah Cutler Gymnasium was designed and built. James Bradberry Architects received an AIA Honor Award for their architectural design.

In April 2009, Oak Lane announced that it would be selling its property with the intent to move to a yet-to-be-determined location following the 2009–10 school year. However, in October 2009, it was announced that the board of trustees decided that it would not be feasible to keep the school going beyond the 2009–10 school year and it would close at the end of the school year. The last graduates presented a gift of running the school website for the ten years after the school closed.

== Distinguished alumni ==
- Noam Chomsky—Linguist, political activist (OLCDS)
- Ilana Davidson—Grammy Award-winning soprano (OLDS)
- Yah Levi (Karl Goldstein)—music producer and multi-instrumentalist songwriter, bandleader, luthier and archivist of folk music and world music (OLDS)
- Suzanne Fleisher Roberts—Actress, playwright, author, director, television host (OLCDS)
- Carolee Schneemann—Performance artist, feminist, social activist (OLCDS)
- Ellen Schrecker—Historian (OLCDS)
- Ezra Stone—Actor, director (OLCDS)
- Leonard Uhr—Computer scientist (OLCDS)

== Distinguished faculty ==
- Boris Blai—Sculptor. Taught art at OLCDS.
- Henry Courtenay Fenn—Sinologist. Taught at OLCDS 1929-1935
- Hope Cumming Horn—Headed Art Department at OLCDS. Art Gallery at University of Scranton, in her hometown, is named for her.
- Armand Mednick—Art, French, Art History. Taught at OLDS 1960-2010
- Anna Mullikin—Mathematician. Taught at OLCDS 1921-1922

== Alumni bibliography ==
- Bluestine, Eric (2000). The Ways Children Learn Music: An Introduction and Practical Guide to Music Learning Theory. Chicago: GIA Publications. ISBN 978-1-579-99108-1. (2nd Ed.—1st Ed. published 1995).
- Chomsky, Noam, Noam Chomsky bibliography and filmography
- Roberts, Suzanne Fleisher (1968). Hope Farrell, Crusading Nurse. New York: Prestige Books.
- Roberts, Suzanne Fleisher (1969). Katie Jones goes to Washington. New York: Avalon.
- Silverstein, Karol Ruth (2019). Cursed. Watertown, Mass.: Charlesbridge Publishing. ISBN 978-1-580-89940-6.

== Faculty bibliography ==
- Fenn, Henry Courtenay; et al. (1958). A Syllabus of the History of Chinese Civilization and Culture 6th Edition. New York: China Society of America.
- Froelicher, Francis Mitchell (1917). Swiss Stories and Legends. New York: Macmillan.
- Garvey, Francis Marion; et al. (1940). Working with Words: A Basic Speller. New York: T. Nelson and Sons.
- Mednick, Armand; et al. (1968). Directions 1968. Philadelphia: Philadelphia College of Art.
- Mednick, Armand (with Janice Booker) (1983). Holocaust testimony of Armand Mednick : transcript of audiotaped interview. Melrose Park, Pa.: Gratz College.
