= Frank Ritter =

Frank Ritter may refer to:

- Frank Ritter (psychologist), professor at Pennsylvania State University
- Frank Ritter (entrepreneur), founder of The Ritter Company and contributor to a forerunner of the Rochester Institute of Technology
  - Frank Ritter Memorial Ice Arena on the RIT campus, named after the above person
- Frank Ritter Shumway, ice skating official, grandson of the entrepreneur.
