= Mary Beth Rosson =

Computer scientist

- Occupations: Director of Graduate Programs and Professor at Penn State College of Information Sciences and Technology

Academic background
- Education: University of Texas at Austin, Trinity University (Texas)

Academic work
- Discipline: Human-computer interaction, Psychology, Integrated and Visual Development Environments, Software Testing and Debugging
- Website: ist.psu.edu/directory/mur13, mrosson.ist.psu.edu

Mary Beth Rosson is the director of graduate programs and professor at the Penn State College of Information Sciences and Technology. Rosson also co-directs the collaboration and innovation lab. Most of her research concentrates on End User Programming, Computer Supported Cooperative Work (CSCW), and Human-Computer Interaction (HCI). Prior to teaching at Penn State, Rosson taught at the Virginia Tech Computer Science department for 10 years and worked as a research staff manager at IBM's Thomas J. Watson Research Center for 11 years. Rosson also served as the Dean for the Penn State College of Information Sciences and Technology from 2014 to 2016. Rosson earned her Ph.D. in experimental psychology in 1982 from the University of Texas at Austin and her Bachelors in Psychology from Trinity University(Texas) in 1977.

== Research ==
Rosson currently co-directs Penn State's CSCL Lab with her husband, John Carroll. She is a founding member of the End Users Shaping Effective Software (EUSES) Consortium, which focuses on issues and techniques related to end-user software engineering. Her other research interests include community informatics, environments and tools for object-oriented programming and design, and visual programming environments. She has also done work related to scenario-based design and minimalism Rosson and Carroll co-developed the task-artifact framework for design.

== Publications ==
Rosson and Carroll have co-authored a book, Usability Engineering: Scenario-Based Development of Human-Computer Interaction. Rosson has co-authored dozens of book chapters. She has authored or co-authored over one hundred journal articles and refereed conference proceedings Rosson has over 423 publications as of 2022. She also has collaborated with IntechOpen to edit the book "Advances in Learning Processes". This contains a collection of papers on topics relating to technology in educational settings.

== Professional activities ==
- General Chair for CHI in 2006
- Doctoral Symposium Chair for DIS in 2006
- Program Committee and Graduate Symposium Mentor for VL/HCC in 2006
- General Chair for OOPSLA in 2000

== Awards and honors ==
- 2020 Elected Fellow of the Association for Computing Machinery for contributions to human-computer interaction, including scenario-based design
- 2007 she was recognized as a Distinguished Scientist by the ACM
- 2001 ACM Recognition of Service Award
- Awarded the SIGCHI Award for service as CHI 1997 Technical Program Co-chair International
- Member of the SIGCHI Academy

== Education ==
- Ph.D., Human Experimental Psychology University of Texas, Austin, Texas, 1982
- B.A., Psychology, Summa Cum Laude, Trinity University, San Antonio, Texas, 1977
