= Leonard Uhr =

American computer scientist

- Born: 1927
- Died: October 5, 2000
- Education: Princeton University (B.A. in Psychology)
- Alma mater: University of Michigan (Ph.D. in Psychology), University of Brussels, Johns Hopkins University
- Known for: Pattern recognition, machine learning, artificial intelligence
- Notable work: "A Pattern Recognition Program That Generates, Evaluates, and Adjusts Its Own Operators"
- Scientific career
- Fields: Computer science, cognitive science
- Institutions: University of Wisconsin–Madison, University of Michigan

Leonard Uhr (1927 – October 5, 2000) was an American computer scientist and a pioneer in computer vision, pattern recognition, machine learning and cognitive science. He was an expert in many aspects of human neurophysiology and perception, and a central theme of his research was to design artificial intelligence systems based on his understanding of how the human brain works. He was one of the early proponents of incorporation into artificial intelligence algorithms of methods for dealing with uncertainty.

Uhr published eight books (as author and/or editor) and nearly 150 journal and conference papers. His seminal work was an article written in 1963 with Charles Vossler, "A Pattern Recognition Program That Generates, Evaluates, and Adjusts Its Own Operators", reprinted in Computers and Thought — edited by Edward Feigenbaum and J. Feldman — which showcases the work of the scientists who defined the field of artificial intelligence. He was a Ph.D. major professor for 20 students, many of whom have gone on to become in their own right important contributors to artificial intelligence.

Uhr graduated from Princeton University in 1949 with a B.A. in psychology. He received master's degrees in philosophy from the University of Brussels and Johns Hopkins University in 1951 before obtaining his Ph.D. in psychology in 1957 from the University of Michigan. As a child, Uhr attended Oak Lane Country Day School outside Philadelphia.

Uhr was a professor of computer science and of neuroscience at the University of Wisconsin–Madison. Prior to that, he was also on the faculty of psychology at the University of Michigan.

== Major works ==
1. Vasant Honavar and Leonard Uhr. (Ed.) Artificial Intelligence and Neural Networks: Steps Toward Principled Integration. New York: Academic Press. 1994. ISBN 0-12-355055-6
2. Leonard Uhr. Multi-Computer Architectures for Artificial Intelligence: Toward Fast, Robust, Parallel Systems. New York: Wiley. 1987. ISBN 0-471-84979-0
3. Leonard Uhr (Ed.) Parallel Computer Vision. Boston: Academic Press. 1987. ISBN 0-12-706958-5
4. Leonard Uhr. Algorithm Structured Computer Arrays and Networks: Architectures for Images, Percepts, Models, Information. Boston: Academic Press. 1984. ISBN 0-12-706960-7
5. Leonard Uhr. Pattern Recognition, Learning, and Thought. Englewood Cliffs: Prentice-Hall. 1973. ISBN 0-13-654095-3
6. Leonard Uhr (Ed.) Pattern Recognition. New York: Wiley. 1966. ISBN 0-471-89600-4
7. Leonard Uhr and James Miller (Ed.) Drugs and Behavior. New York: Wiley. 1960. ISBN 0-471-89595-4
8. John C. Pollard, Leonard Uhr, Elizabeth Stern. Drugs and Phantasy Boston: Little Brown and Company. 1965
