= New Horizon College of Engineering =

College in Bangalore, India

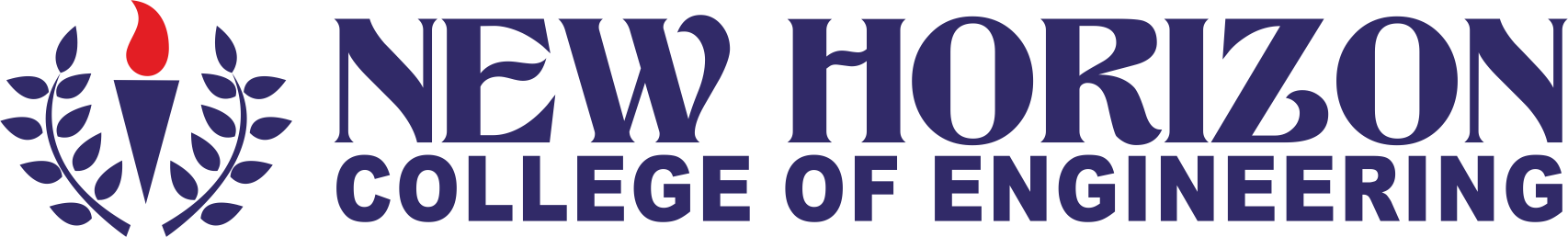
- Other names: NHEI, NHCE
- Type: Private
- Established: 2001
- Parent institution: New Horizon Educational Institution
- Chairman: Dr.Mohan Manghnani
- Academic staff: 1000+
- Students: 7500+
- Location: New Horizon Knowledge Park, Ring Road, Bellandur Post, near Marathahalli, Bangalore, Karnataka, 560103, India
- Language: English
- Website: newhorizoncollegeofengineering.in

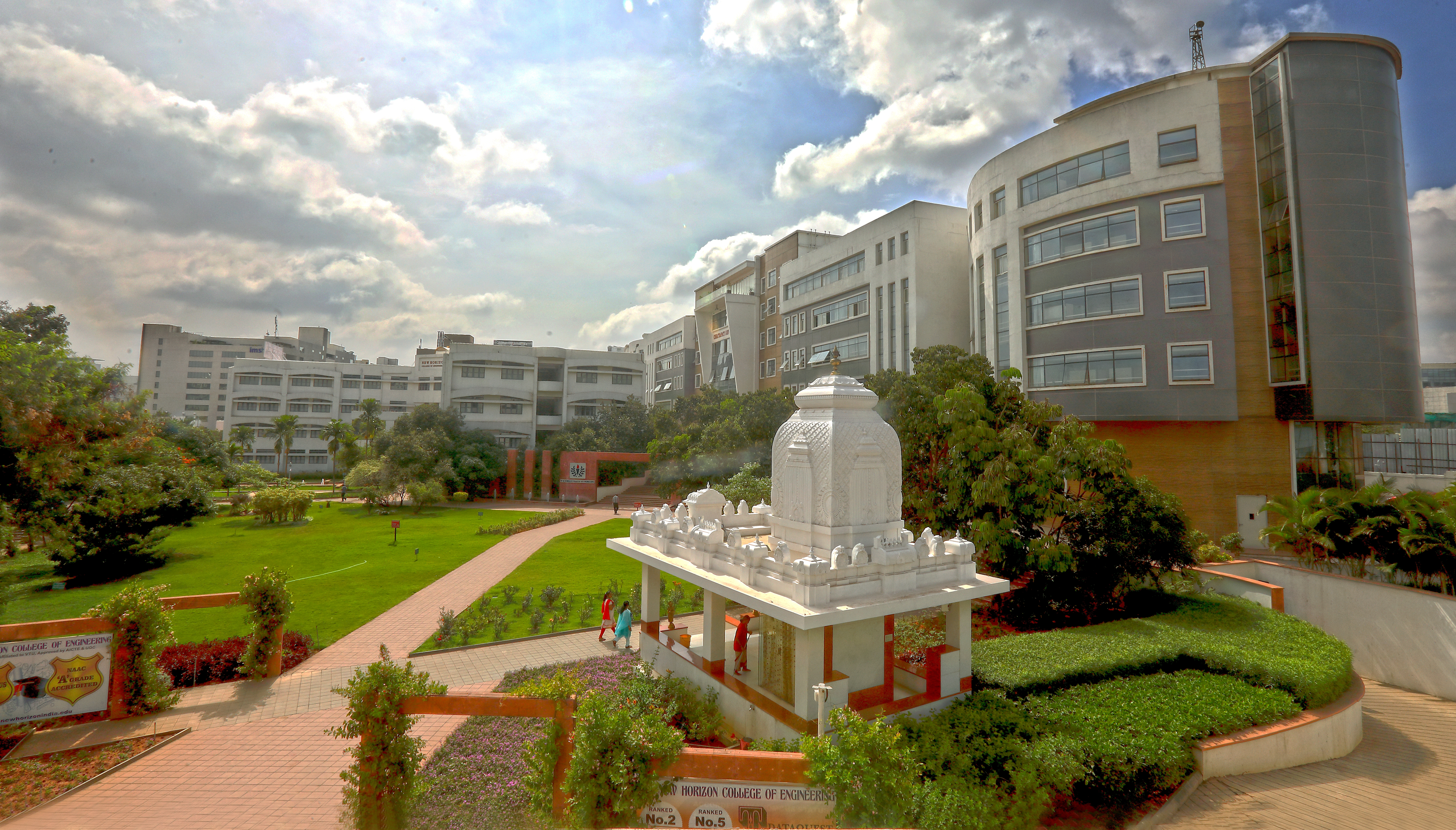
NHCE Campus

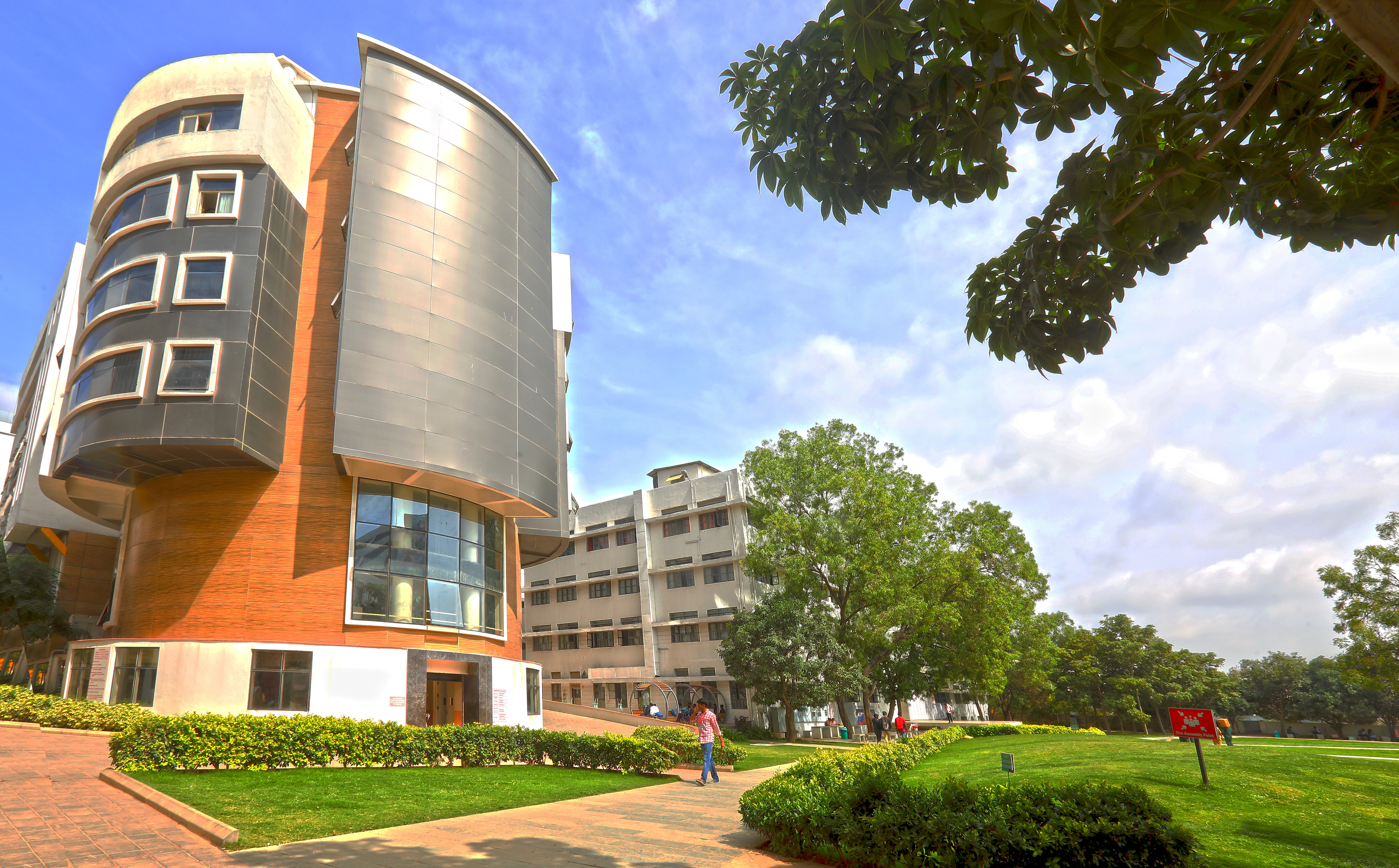
NHCE Campus

The New Horizon College of Engineering (NHCE) is a private engineering college located near Marathahalli, in Bangalore, India. Established in 2001, the college is part of the New Horizon Educational Institution which was established in 1970.

In 2024, the College was ranked between 151 and 200 in Engineering according to the National Institutional Ranking Framework. It is accredited by NAAC with ‘A’ grade and National Board of Accreditation (NBA). The New Horizon College of Engineering affiliated to Visvesvaraya Technological University (VTU), approved by the All India Council for Technical Education (AICTE) and University Grants Commission (UGC).

Each year, New Horizon College of Engineering hosts Sargam Fest, a National Level inter collegiate cultural festival for students. In 2022, several students were arrested after allegedly chanting pro-Pakistan slogans at the event.

In 2014, the College came into controversy after a student was required to pay four years off tuition fees in advance in order to have original documents returned after they were sent to the university for consideration of admission. The Bangalore Urban District Consumer Disputes Redressal Forum later termed the move as "blackmail" of students. In 2018, the College lost a lawsuit brought by the student for withholding their original documents, preventing them from pursuing studies elsewhere.

In 2024, the College came under suspicion for a seat-blocking scheme for the 2024-2025 academic year. The College was alleged to use student's login information to sell study positions and for money laundering. In June 2025, the college, along with Akash Institute of Engineering and Technology and BMS College of Engineering were raided by officials at the Enforcement Directorate. As of July 2025, the Karnataka state government has not approved further seat enhancements for the college.

In June 2025, the Enforcement Directorate conducted raids on multiple private engineering colleges, including New Horizon, in connection with a seat-blocking investigation. However, in subsequent proceedings, the Karnataka High Court recorded that no charge sheet had been filed against New Horizon College of Engineering in relation to the case.

In August 2025, the High Court further held that the college was not named as an accused in the charge sheet and therefore quashed the State Government’s refusal to grant approval for increased student intake and new courses, directing the authorities to issue the necessary No Objection Certificate (NOC).
