= Naphtha =

Flammable liquid hydrocarbon mixture

Naphtha (/ˈnæfθə/, more rarely: /ˈnæpθə/) is a flammable liquid hydrocarbon mixture. Generally, it is a fraction of crude oil, but it can also be produced from natural-gas condensates, petroleum distillates, and the fractional distillation of coal tar and peat. In some industries and regions, the name naphtha refers to crude oil or refined petroleum products such as kerosene or diesel fuel.

It is used as a dilutant, a fuel and in the production of plastics.

Naphtha is also known as Shellite in Australia.

== Etymology ==
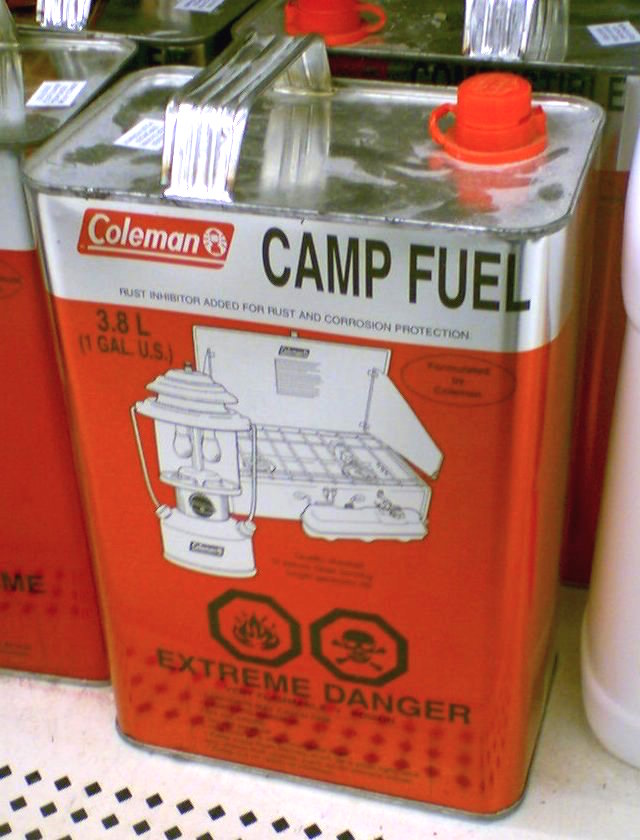
White gas, exemplified by Coleman Camp Fuel, is a common naphtha-based fuel used in many lanterns and stoves.

The word naphtha comes from Latin through Ancient Greek (νάφθα), derived from Middle Persian naft ("wet", "naphtha"), the latter meaning of which was an assimilation from the Akkadian 𒉌𒆳𒊏 napṭu (see Semitic relatives such as Arabic نَفْط nafṭ ["petroleum"], Syriac ܢܰܦܬܳܐ naftā, and Hebrew נֵפְט neft, meaning petroleum).

=== Antiquity ===
The Treaty of Esarhaddon (c. 675 BC) briefly mentions during a listing of curses how "naphtha [shall] be your ointment" if the oath made in the treaty is broken. Further on, it also prescribes the curse:

May they make your flesh and the flesh of your women, your brothers, your sons and your daughters as black as [bitu]men, pitch and naphtha.

The book of II Maccabees (2nd cent. BC) tells how a "thick water" was put on a sacrifice at the time of Nehemiah and when the sun shone it caught fire. It adds that "those around Nehemiah termed this 'Nephthar,' which means Purification, but it is called Nephthaei by the many." This same substance is mentioned in the Mishnah as one of the generally permitted oils for lamps on Shabbat, although Rabbi Tarfon permits only olive oil (Mishnah Shabbat 2).

In Ancient Greek, it was used to refer to any sort of petroleum or pitch. The Greek word νάφθα designates one of the materials used to stoke the fiery furnace in the Song of the Three Children (possibly 1st or 2nd cent. BC). The translation of Charles Brenton renders this as "rosin."

The naphtha of antiquity is explained to be a "highly flammable light fraction of petroleum, an extremely volatile, strong-smelling, gaseous liquid, common in oil deposits of the Near East;" it was a chief ingredient in incendiary devices described by Latin authors of the Roman period.

=== Modern period ===
Since the 19th century, solvent naphtha has denoted a product (xylene or trimethylbenzenes) derived by fractional distillation from petroleum; these mineral spirits, also known as "Stoddard Solvent," were originally the main active ingredient in Fels Naptha laundry soap. The naphtha in Fels Naptha was later removed as a cancer risk.

The usage of the term "naphtha" during this time typically implies petroleum naphtha, a colorless liquid with a similar odor to gasoline. However, "coal tar naphtha," a reddish brown liquid that is a mixture of hydrocarbons (toluene, xylene, and cumene, etc.), could also be intended in some contexts.

=== Petroleum ===
Generally, in pre 19th century sources, "naphtha" simply meant crude oil, but this usage is now obsolete in English. There are a number of cognates to the word in different modern languages, typically signifying "petroleum" or "crude oil."

The Ukrainian & Belarusian word нафта (nafta), Lithuanian, Latvian, & Estonian "nafta," and the Persian naft (نفت) mean "crude oil." The Russian word нефть (neft') means "crude oil," but нафта (nafta) is a synonym of ligroin. Also, in Albania, Bosnia and Herzegovina, Bulgaria, Croatia, Finland, Italy, Serbia, Slovenia, and North Macedonia nafta (нафта in Cyrillic) is colloquially used to indicate diesel fuel and crude oil. In the Czech Republic and Slovakia, nafta was historically used for both diesel fuel and crude oil, but its use for crude oil is now obsolete and it generally indicates diesel fuel. In Bulgarian, nafta means diesel fuel, while neft, as well as petrol (петрол in Cyrillic), means crude oil. Nafta is also used in everyday parlance in Argentina, Uruguay and Paraguay to refer to gasoline/petrol. Similarly, in Flemish, the word naft(e) is used colloquially for gasoline. In Poland, the word nafta means kerosene, and colloquially crude oil (the technical name for crude oil is ropa naftowa, also colloquially used for diesel fuel as ropa).

== Types ==
Naphtha has been divided into two types by many sources in order to differentiate between common grades more clearly:

One source distinguishes by boiling point as well as carbon atom count per molecule:

- Light naphtha is the fraction boiling between 30 and 90 °C (86 and 194 °F) and consists of molecules with 5–6 carbon atoms.
- Heavy naphtha boils between 90 and 200 °C (194 and 392 °F) and consists of molecules with 6–12 carbon atoms.

Chemistry of Hazardous Materials differentiates light and heavy based on the carbon atom count and hydrocarbon structure:

- Light [is] a mixture consisting mainly of straight-chained and cyclic aliphatic hydrocarbons having from five to six carbon atoms per molecule.
- Heavy [is] a mixture consisting mainly of straight-chained and cyclic aliphatic hydrocarbons having from seven to nine carbon atoms per molecule.

Some sources also define petroleum naphtha, which contains both heavy and light naphtha, and typically consists of 15-30% of crude oil by weight.

== Uses ==
=== Heavy crude oil dilution ===
Naphtha is used to dilute heavy crude oil to reduce its viscosity and enable/facilitate transport; undiluted heavy crude cannot normally be transported by pipeline, and may also be difficult to pump onto oil tankers. Other common dilutants include natural-gas condensate and light crude. However, naphtha is a particularly efficient dilutant and can be recycled from diluted heavy crude after transport and processing. The importance of oil dilutants has increased as global production of lighter crude oils has fallen and shifted to exploitation of heavier reserves.

=== Fuel ===
Light naphtha is used as a fuel in some commercial applications. One notable example is wick-based cigarette lighters, such as the Zippo, which draw "lighter fluid"—naphtha—into a wick from a reservoir to be ignited using the flint and wheel.

It is also a fuel for camping stoves and oil lanterns, known as "white gas", where naphtha's low boiling point makes it easy to ignite. Naphtha is sometimes preferred over kerosene because it clogs fuel lines less. The outdoor equipment manufacturer MSR published a list of trade names and translations to help outdoor enthusiasts obtain the correct products in various countries.

Naphtha was also historically used as both a fuel and a working fluid in some small boats where steam technology was impractical; most were built to circumvent safety laws relating to traditional steam launches.

As an internal combustion engine fuel, petroleum naphtha has seen very little use and suffers from lower efficiency and low octane ratings, typically 40 to 70 RON. It can be used to run unmodified diesel engines, though it has a longer ignition-delay than diesel. Naphtha tends to be noisy in combustion due to the high pressure rise rate. There is a possibility of using naphtha as a low-octane base fuel in an octane-on-demand concept, with the engine drawing a high-octane mix only when needed. Naptha benefits from lesser emissions in refinement: fuel energy losses from "well-to-tank" are 13%; lower than the 22% losses for petroleum.

Petroleum naphtha is also used as a feedstock for catalytic reforming, which uses heat, pressure, and catalysts to produce high-octane components for gasoline.

=== Camera Repair ===
Naphtha is commonly used by camera repair technicians as a solvent. It is ideal for dissolving oxidized and dried lubricants from the mechanism of analog film cameras. It quickly dissolves sticky and oily residue which would slow down the mechanism timing or lock it up entirely. Its volatile nature allows it to quickly evaporate making it ideal for this application.

=== Plastics ===
Naphtha is a crucial component in the production of plastics.

== Health and safety considerations ==
The safety data sheets (SDSs) from various naphtha vendors indicate various hazards such as a flammable mixture of hydrocarbons: flammability, carcinogenicity, skin and airway irritation, etc.

Humans can be exposed to naphtha in the workplace by inhalation, ingestion, dermal contact, and eye contact. The US Occupational Safety and Health Administration (OSHA) has set the permissible exposure limit for naphtha in the workplace as 100 ppm (400 mg/m^{3}) over an 8-hour workday. The US National Institute for Occupational Safety and Health (NIOSH) has set a recommended exposure limit (REL) of 100 ppm (400 mg/m^{3}) over an 8-hour workday. At levels of 1000 ppm, which equates to 10 times the lower exposure limit, naphtha is immediately dangerous to life and health.

== See also ==
- Coleman fuel
- Fels-Naptha
- Fractional distillation
- Fluid catalytic cracking
- Greek fire
- Hydrocarbon
- Kerosene
- Mineral spirits
- Naphtha launch
- Oil refinery
- Petroleum distillation
- Petroleum naphtha
- Tar
