= B. M. Sreenivasaiah =

Philanthropist active in India

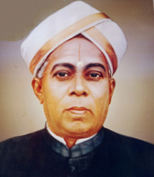
- Children: 1

Bhusanayana Mukundadasa Sreenivasaiah founded India's first private engineering college BMS College of Engineering in 1946 and later established a sister campus B.M.S. Institute of Technology and Management in 2002.

He was awarded the title Dharmaprakasha Rajakarya Prasaktha from the Maharaja of Mysore in 1946.
