= B.M.S. Institute of Technology and Management =

Engineering college in Bangalore, India

BMS Institute of Technology
- Motto in English: Freedom Through Truth
- Type: Private (Government Aided)
- Established: 2002; 24 years ago
- Parent institution: B.M.S. College of Engineering
- Accreditation: AICTE, National Board of Accreditation, National Assessment and Accreditation Council
- Academic affiliations: Autonomous institute under VTU
- Principal: Sanjay H A
- Dean: Anil G. N (VP)
- Academic staff: 700
- Administrative staff: 500
- Total staff: 1200
- Students: 6000
- Undergraduates: 5500
- Postgraduates: 500
- Location: Bangalore, Karnataka, India; 13°7′59.18″N 77°34′6.44″E
- Campus: Urban, 25 acres (10 ha)
- Colors: Blue and white
- Nicknames: Bmsitians, BMSians
- Website: bmsit.ac.in

B.M.S. Institute of Technology (Autonomous) is a private (Government Aided) engineering college in Yelahanka, Bangalore, India. It was started in 2002 as Bhusanayana Mukundadas Sreenivasaiah Institute of Technology (BMSIT) and is run by the B.M.S. Educational Trust. It is affiliated with Visvesvaraya Technological University and became autonomous in 2020. It is partially funded by the Government of Karnataka.

== Rankings ==
College rankings

Engineering – India
- NIRF (2023): 101-150

B.M.S. Institute of Technology and Management was ranked in the 101-150 band by the National Institutional Ranking Framework (NIRF) engineering ranking in 2023.
