= Penn State University College of Information Sciences and Technology =

College of Pennsylvania State University

Coordinates: 40.79368°N 77.86812°W

College of Information Sciences and Technology
- Established: 1999
- Dean: Andrea Tapia
- Location: University Park, Pennsylvania, U.S.
- Campus: University Park, Pennsylvania, U.S.
- Website: ist.psu.edu

The College of Information Sciences and Technology, also known as the College of IST at Pennsylvania State University, was established in 1999. Headquartered at the University Park campus in University Park, Pennsylvania, the college's programs are offered at 21 Penn State campus locations. Dr. Andrea Tapia currently serves as the college's dean.

The college focuses on the study of issues that exist "at the intersection of information, technology, and society, aiming to prepare leading professionals and scholars who can leverage technology and critical thinking skills to solve the complex challenges of an information society." Work in the college currently focuses on four major areas in education, research, and outreach: data sciences and artificial intelligence, human-computer interaction, privacy and security, and social and organizational informatics.

The College of IST belongs to a group of i-Schools dedicated to advancing information sciences and informatics. It currently offers six Bachelor of Science degrees; two master's and one doctoral degree at the University Park campus; and several undergraduate and graduate degrees and certificates through other Penn State campuses, including Penn State World Campus.

== History ==
The School of Information Sciences and Technology was founded in 1997 and approved by the Penn State Board of Trustees in 1998 based on a need perceived by the University and advisors from government and industry for educating students in the emerging fields of information science and technology.

The goal was to extend beyond classic computer science, management information systems, and library science to prepare students to meet challenges in the use of computers and networked systems for applications such as intelligent systems, medicine, business, homeland security, environmental monitoring, and control of complex systems.

The School was charged with producing graduates who would have basic knowledge of information technologies such as artificial intelligence, computer programming, discrete mathematics, database concepts, human-computer interaction, simulation, and understanding of information system concepts, as well as the capability to work in teams to understand how information technologies can be utilized in real applications involving individuals, organizations, and ultimately national or global enterprises.

When it opened in September 1999, the School admitted 105 students, operated 43 courses, and hosted five faculty members. In June 2000, the School offered its first online course.

The first class of associate degree students graduated in June 2001, with the first class of doctoral students enrolling in August 2001. The School awarded its first bachelor's degrees to 117 students at the University Park campus in May 2003. The School hosted the first conference of the i-School community in September 2005.

The School was renamed as the College of Information Sciences and Technology in 2006 – a designation that signified IST's importance within both the Penn State system and the Commonwealth. The School and then College has coordinated the degree programs in IST across the other Penn State Campuses, allowing students to move between campuses and providing intellectual connections between instructors across the campuses.

== Deans ==
- Dr. James Thomas (1999-2006) was the founding Dean.
- Dr. Hank Foley (2007-2009).
- Dr. David Hall (2009-2014).
- Dr. Mary Beth Rosson (2014-2016, interim).
- Dr. Andrew Sears (2016-2023).
- Dr. Andrea Tapia (2023-present).

== Westgate Building (Previously: IST Building) ==
The Westgate Building, formerly known as the Information Sciences and Technology Building, is located on the west campus of The Pennsylvania State University's University Park campus. The building was formally opened in 2004 as the IST Building and became the home to the College of Information Sciences and Technology and the School of Electrical Engineering and Computer Science.

The 199,000-square-foot (18,500 m^{2}) building was designed by Rafael Vinoly Architects in New York, New York and Perfido Weiskopf Architects in Pittsburgh, Pennsylvania. The architecture was inspired by the Ponte Vecchio in Florence, Italy. The construction of the building is 199,000-square-foot (18,500 m^{2}) and cost $58.8 million to complete. The building serves as a pedestrian bridge which permits pedestrian and bicycle traffic over Atherton Street.

The building houses several classrooms and research laboratories, and collaborative spaces. The largest classroom in the building is the Cybertorium. The Cybertorium seats up to 150 people with stadium seating which faces a large projection screen and a sound system for use by presenters.

The IST Building was renamed Westgate Building in 2017.

== Undergraduate Education ==
The College of IST offers six bachelor of science degrees, including:

- Cybersecurity Analytics and Operations – This program prepares students for a career that focuses on protecting digital information from attack through cyberdefense strategies.
- Data Sciences (Applied Data Sciences) – The Data Sciences program at Penn State is part of an intercollege initiative to develop professionals who can make sense of big data. Students can select from one of three options to focus their studies from within the Data Sciences major: Applied Data Sciences, which is offered by the College of Information Sciences and Technology; Computational Data Sciences, which is offered by the College of Engineering; and Statistical Modeling Data Sciences, which is offered by the Eberly College of Science.
- Enterprise Technology Integration – This program prepares students with the skills to integrate information technology across different systems to meet organizational goals and improve reliability, accessibility, and efficiency.
- Human-Centered Design and Development – This program focuses on helping students identify, design, build, and evaluate technologies to enhance people’s lives.
- Information Sciences and Technology – This program prepares students to create, use, and understand the impact of information and technology in everyday life. Students can select from one of three options to focus their studies from within the IST major: Design and Development, which focuses on the design and development of software and web applications; Integration and Application, which focuses on developing technology-based solutions for businesses and organizations; and People, Organizations and Society[2], which studies how technology can be used to better structure organizations so they can excel.
- Security and Risk Analysis – This program prepares students for careers that focus on protecting information, people, and other assets from threats by applying the principles of risk management.

Many Penn State commonwealth campuses offer associate and bachelor's degrees in these programs.

== Graduate Education ==
The College of Information Sciences and Technology offers graduate degrees at both the master's and doctoral levels.

- Ph.D. in Informatics – A 38-credit program that takes five years to complete on a full-time basis. The program was renamed from a doctorate in Information Sciences and Technology in March 2018. It is designed to provide multidisciplinary training to address complex challenges at the intersection of information, technology, and people that require approaches that transcend traditional disciplinary boundaries.
- Master of Science in Cybersecurity Analytics and Operations – A 30-credit program which takes two years to complete on full-time basis. This program blends education relating to technology, incident response, strategic planning and crisis management.
- Master of Science in Informatics – A 30-credit program which takes two years to complete on full-time basis. The program focuses on how information and technology fundamentally impact (and are impacted by) people, organizations, and the world community.

The three programs attract graduate students from a variety of backgrounds, including computer science, engineering, psychology, sociology, economics, philosophy, visual arts, and mathematics.

== Online Education ==
The College of Information Sciences and Technology offers several online degree options through Penn State World Campus, which allows for students to pursue a degree while maintaining full-time employment, maintaining personal or family responsibilities, and living remotely. The online degrees offered by the College of IST include:

- Master of Professional Studies in Cybersecurity Analytics and Operations
- Master of Professional Studies in Enterprise Architecture and Business Transformation
- Master of Professional Studies in Homeland Security - Information Security and Forensics Option
- Postbaccalaureate Certificate in Information Systems Cybersecurity
- Graduate Certificate in Enterprise Architecture
- Graduate Certificate in Enterprise Information and Security Technology Architecture
- Bachelor of Science in Cybersecurity Analytics and Operations
- Bachelor of Science in Information Sciences and Technology
- Associate in Science in Information Sciences and Technology
- Undergraduate Certificate in Information Sciences and Technology
- Undergraduate Certificate in Security and Risk Analysis

U.S. News & World Report's 2020 Best Online Programs report ranked Penn State World Campus eighth for best online graduate computer information technology programs.

== Faculty and Research ==
The College of Information Sciences and Technology is an interdisciplinary college that integrates a variety of perspectives from computer and information sciences, psychology, social science, economics and public policy, to study the interactions between information, technology, and people, to inform the design of innovative information technologies, and their societal impact. Faculty research focuses on artificial intelligence, informatics (including social informatics, health informatics, security informatics, and community informatics), big data, human-computer interaction, security and privacy, cognitive science, and socio-technical systems. The resulting interdisciplinary research drives major advances in areas such as medicine, energy, environmental monitoring and crisis management.

The college is also the home of the well known academic search engine, CiteSeerX.

The college has more than 70 tenured, tenure-track, and fixed-term faculty. Some faculty of note include:

- John Carroll
- Lee Giles
- Vasant Honavar
- Frank Ritter
- Mary Beth Rosson
- Andrew Sears
- James Z. Wang
- John Yen

== Student organizations ==
There are more than a dozen student organizations in College of Information Sciences and Technology, including:

- Competitive Cyber Security Organization (CCSO)
- Cyber Certifications Club
- Developer Student Club
- Emerging Technology (EmTech)
- Gamma Tau Phi (IST Honors Society)
- IST Benefiting THON
- IST Consulting Group
- IST Living Learning Community
- IST Student Government
- National Security Club
- Nittany Data Labs
- Red Cell Analytics Lab
- User Experience Professionals Association (UXPA) – Penn State Chapter
- Women in IST (WIST)
- Women, International, Racial, Ethnic Diversity Intercultural Network (WIRED IN)
- World Campus Technology Club

== Undergraduate Academic Services ==
The College of Information Sciences and Technology offers a variety of services designed to support undergraduate student learning, personal growth, and professional development, including:

- Office of Career Solutions and Corporate Engagement, which supports students’ career goals through a mandated internship program, career fairs, corporate information sessions, and job preparation workshops.
- Office of Undergraduate Advising, which helps students make informed course choices, explore degree options, and stay on track for graduation.
- Office of Inclusion and Diversity Engagement, which works to foster a more diverse and inclusive community through programming and strategies that recruit, engage, and retain individuals from underrepresented groups.

== Penn State Startup Week ==
The College of Information Sciences and Technology founded "IST Startup Week" in 2012. The event was created to celebrate a $400,000 gift from David Rusenko, a 2007 graduate of the college who along with Chris Fanini and Dan Veltri co-founded the drag-and-drop website building company, Weebly, while they were students at Penn State. The gift — the largest from a graduate in the college's history — created the "David Rusenko Emerging Entrepreneur Scholarship" and the "David Rusenko Entrepreneur-in-Residence Scholarship," both of which continue to help IST students launch their own companies while they are still in school.

The event grew to include other colleges and units across campus, and it was renamed to Penn State Startup Week in 2017. Penn State Startup Week is a weeklong series of events that brings entrepreneurs and innovative thought-leaders to campus for presentations, workshops, mentorship, and student pitch competitions. Past events have drawn speakers from around the country, including the founders of and leaders at high-profile companies like Weebly, Dropbox, Reddit, Lands' End, IBM Watson, and Microsoft.
