= Zote (soap) =

Mexican bar soap

- Product type: Laundry detergent
- Markets: North America, South America, China, South Korea, Ghana

Zote is a Mexican laundry soap brand sold by Fábrica de Jabón La Corona. The soap is popular for hand washing clothes and pretreating oily stains.

Zote's best-known product is a pink bar of soap intended for laundry.

== History ==
The soap brand was started in 1970 by Esteban González Padilla. The name is a play on words in Spanish; Jabón-Zote, the -ote suffix emphasizing a large size.

The soap is produced at the Fábrica de Jabón La Corona in Ecatepec, Mexico State.

Most of the brand's sales are domestic, with 15% of sales outside of Mexico, primarily in the United States and South America. According to the company, soap sales increased by 20% in 2020 amid the COVID-19 pandemic.

== Products ==
The ingredients of the pink Zote bar are sodium tallowate (derived from animal fat), sodium cocoate, Citronella oil (fragrance), glycerin and optical brightener.

Other laundry products include specialized bars of soap, indicated by the color, laundry flakes, and liquid detergent.

Non-laundry products include consumer items like cooking oil Aceite 123 and bath soap Rosa Venus. Industrial items include vegetable oil Grano de Oro, sold primarily to baking companies, and pharmaceutical grade glycerin.

== See also ==
- Fels-Naptha
- List of cleaning products
