= Der fließende Fels =

- Starring: Peter Ustinov
- Country of origin: Germany

Der fließende Fels is a German television series.

== See also ==
- List of German television series
