= Joseph Fels =

American soap manufacturer, Georgist and philanthropist

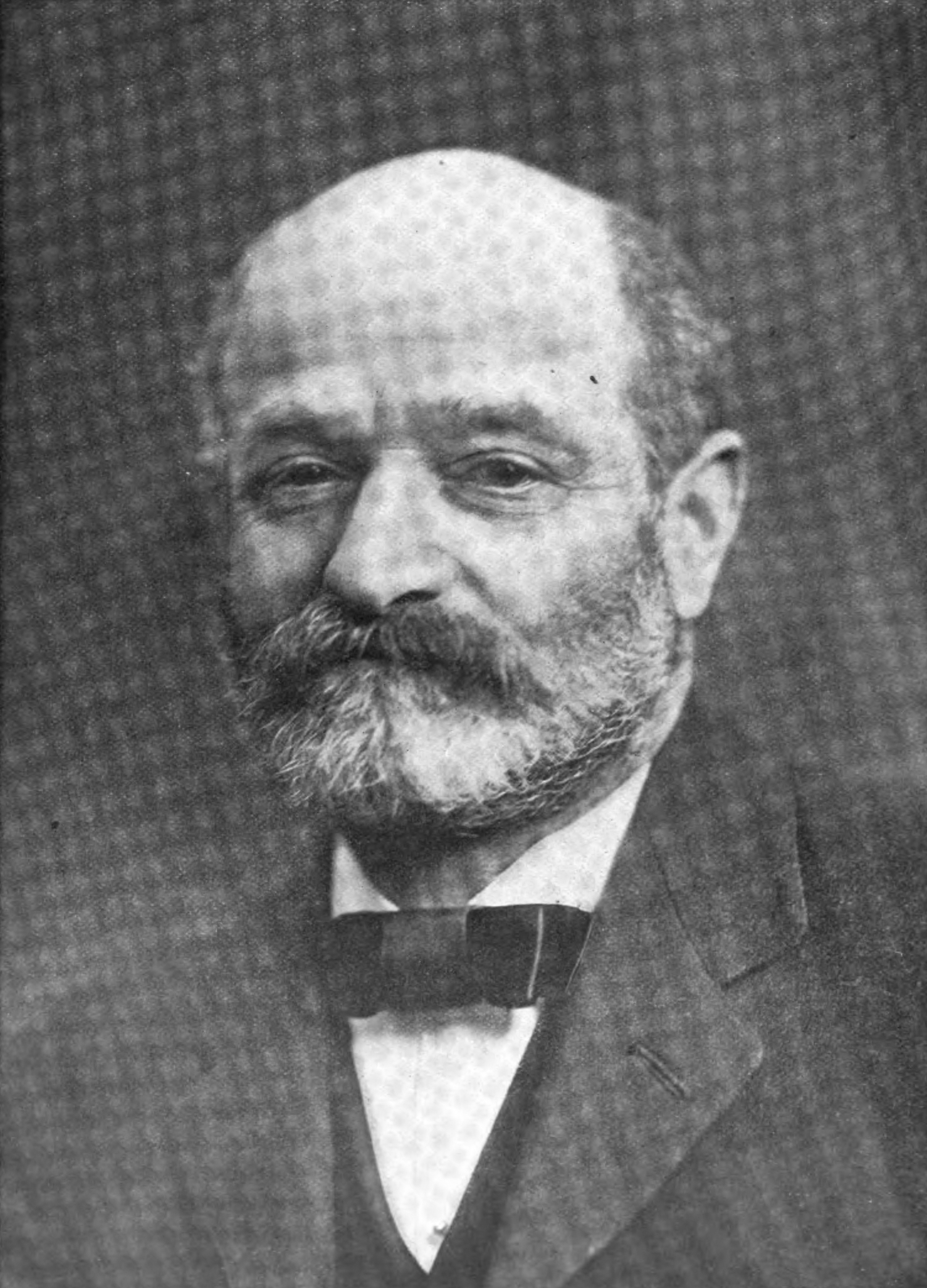
- Fels in 1910
- Born: 16 December 1853; Halifax County, Virginia, US
- Died: 22 February 1914 (age 60); Philadelphia, Pennsylvania, US
- Occupation: Soap manufacturer
- Spouse: Mary Fels
- Family: Samuel Simeon Fels (brother)

Joseph Fels (16 December 1853–22 February 1914) was an American soap manufacturer, millionaire, Georgist and philanthropist.

== Biography ==
Born of German Jewish immigrants in Halifax County, Virginia, Fels moved with his family to Baltimore in 1866; by 1876 he had assumed control of a soap manufacturing company based in Philadelphia, and brought two of his brothers in as partners shortly after. One of them, Samuel Simeon Fels, became president of the firm.

In 1894 he developed the Fels-Naptha soap brand, historically used as a home remedy in the treatment of contact dermatitis caused by exposure to poison ivy, poison oak, and other oil-transmitted organic skin-irritants. The soap is still marketed by the Dial Corporation as of 2011.

While his own fortune rapidly accumulated, as early as 1890 Fels had become an adherent of Henry George and his proposed land value tax. Fels funded the founding of the Georgist colony of Arden, Delaware, in 1900, managed by architect William Lightfoot Price and sculptor Frank Stephens. This was one of several experimental labor colonies he funded. In 1894 he made financial contributions to the founding of the single-tax colony in Fairhope, Alabama, and many similar experiments in England such as the one founded at Nispell's Farm at Mayland in Essex in 1906. Fels employed Charles Holden to design the farm cottages at that site.

From 1906 through 1912 Fels also contributed to the Jewish Territorialist Organization, in hopes that a Jewish homeland would be founded along Georgist principle. His wife, Mary (née Fels), continued to support this cause after Fels' death from influenza on 22 February 1914; his brother Samuel also remained an active philanthropist. Fels also gave money to the Russian Social Democratic (Communist) party. [Source: Simon Sebag Montefiore, "Young Stalin."] His only child, Irvin S. Fels, died in infancy.

== Sources ==
- Fels, Mary (1916). Joseph Fels: His Life-Work. Kessinger Publishing. ISBN 1-4286-6155-7.
