= Laurent Fels =

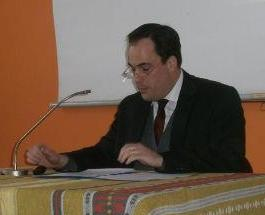
Laurent Fels in 2013

Laurent Fels, PhD in French literature, is a writer and high school teacher in Luxembourg and is a member of the research centre 'Écritures' of the Université de Lorraine. He was born in Esch-sur-Alzette. He is the founder and editor of the magazine Les Cahiers de poésie.

His work earned him a seat in the European Academy of Sciences, Arts and Letters.

He is also a devoted reader of philosophers of the Far East and continues his poetic quest in an ontological approach. Author of 17 books, his work has been crowned by the Grand Prix de Littérature from the National Academy of Metz in 2007.

Laurent Fels is also a member and scientific collaborator in numerous literary institutions. He has been a member of the European Academy of Poetry since April 2009.

His works have been translated into German, English, Spanish, Italian, Arabic, Roman, Uzbek and Chinese.

Laurent Fels is also a pilot and a flight instructor.

== Selection of works ==
- 2005: Voyage au bout de l'étoile (Poems)
- 2005: Paroles Oubliées (Poems)
- 2005: Dire l'Indicible / Das Unsagbare in Worte fassen (Poems in French and German)
- 2005: Le Cycle du Verbe / Wortzyklus (Poems in French and German)
- 2005: Îles enchantées (Poems)
- 2006: Comme un sourire / Wie ein Lächeln (Poems in French, Arabic and German)
- 2007: Intermittences / Intermitente / Intervalle (Poems in French, Roman and German)
- 2007: La dernière tombe restera ouverte (Poems)
- 2008: Ourganos (Esoteric poems)
- 2008: Nielles (Poems)
- 2009: Arcendrile suivi de Nielles (Poems)
- 2010: À contre-jour (Poems)
- 2012: Regards de soie (Poems in French, English and Chinese)
- 2014: Elfenbeintestament (Poems in German)
- 2015: Cyclamen (Poems in French)
