= Information Sciences and Technology Building =

Coordinates: 40.79370°N 77.86836°W

Westgate Building
- North side view of the Westgate building
- Interactive map of the Westgate Building area

General information
- Status: Completed
- Location: University Park, Pennsylvania
- Current tenants: Penn State College of Information Sciences and Technology
- Opened: 2004
- Cost: $58.8 million

Technical details
- Floor area: 199,000 square feet (18,500 m^{2})

Design and construction
- Architecture firm: Rafael Viñoly Architects, New York City, and Perfido Weiskopf Architects, Pittsburgh
- Main contractor: Turner Construction Company

The Westgate Building, formerly known as the Information Sciences and Technology Building (commonly known as the IST Building) is a classroom building at Pennsylvania State University. Construction was completed in January 2004. With at least 13 doors, and no main entrance, it has only recently been assigned a street address, 288 N. Burrowes Rd., University Park, PA 16802.

== History and architectural features ==
This building was designed by the acclaimed architect Rafael Vinoly. According to the Penn State IST website, the design of the building "began as an inkpen sketch on a paper dinner napkin." He characterizes the building as "a labor of love . . . my own personal obsession for years", stating that, in the beginning, it seemed "crazy and extreme" to construct an S-shaped building over North Atherton Street. According to the Penn State IST Website, "His firm, Rafael Vinoly Architects, New York, partnered with Perfido Weiskopf Architects, Pittsburgh, for the design inspired by the Ponte Vecchio in Florence." Despite its name, this building currently is the home of both the Pennsylvania State University Computer Science and Engineering Department, in addition to the College of IST.

In order to "better represent the building’s many uses", the building was renamed the Westgate Building in 2017.
