= Adler Fels =

Winery in Sonoma County, California

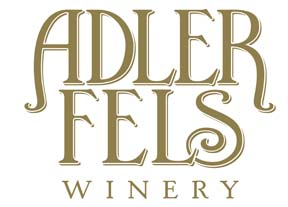
- Location: Santa Rosa, California, United States
- Other labels: Coastline, Kitchen Sink, Totally Random, Eye Candy, Coyote Creek and Leaping Lizard
- Founded: 1979
- Key people: Dan O'Leary, GM; Harry Parducci Jr., Director of Winemaking; Dana Fehler, Marketing and PR Manager
- Parent company: Adams Wine Group
- Cases/yr: 610,000
- Known for: Gewürztraminer; Sauvignon blanc
- Varietals: Gewürztraminer, Sauvignon blanc, Cabernet Sauvignon, Chardonnay, Merlot, Pinot noir, Muscat, Syrah, Zinfandel, White Zinfandel, Red Blends, White Blends, Riesling, Pinot grigio, Sweet Red Blends
- Website: www.adlerfels.com

Adler Fels Winery is a California winery based in Sonoma that produces over 100 different wine labels in addition to production under its own Adler Fels brand. These include private labels for various restaurants, hotels and retailers.

== History ==
Adler Fels Winery was founded in Sonoma Valley in 1979 by David and Ayn Coleman. The winery soon established itself as a producer of Sauvignon blanc, Gewürztraminer and Chardonnay from Sonoma County, with a particular emphasis on Russian River Valley. Adler Fels later expanded their sourcing to include varietals from Napa Valley and other premier appellations throughout California. In 2004, the winery was purchased by Adams Wine Group.

=== Lawsuit ===
A wine line under the name Cabzilla used an image resembling too much like Godzilla and was sued by Toho for copyright infringement. The suit ended with the company being forced to dump all of the wine.

== Production and distribution ==
In 2008, Adler Fels has a sales volume of 450,000 cases, ranking it as the 27th top winery in the United States by Winebusiness.com. Among the labels produced by Adler Fels include Coyote Creek, Coastline, Big Ass and Leaping Lizard.

== Gallery ==
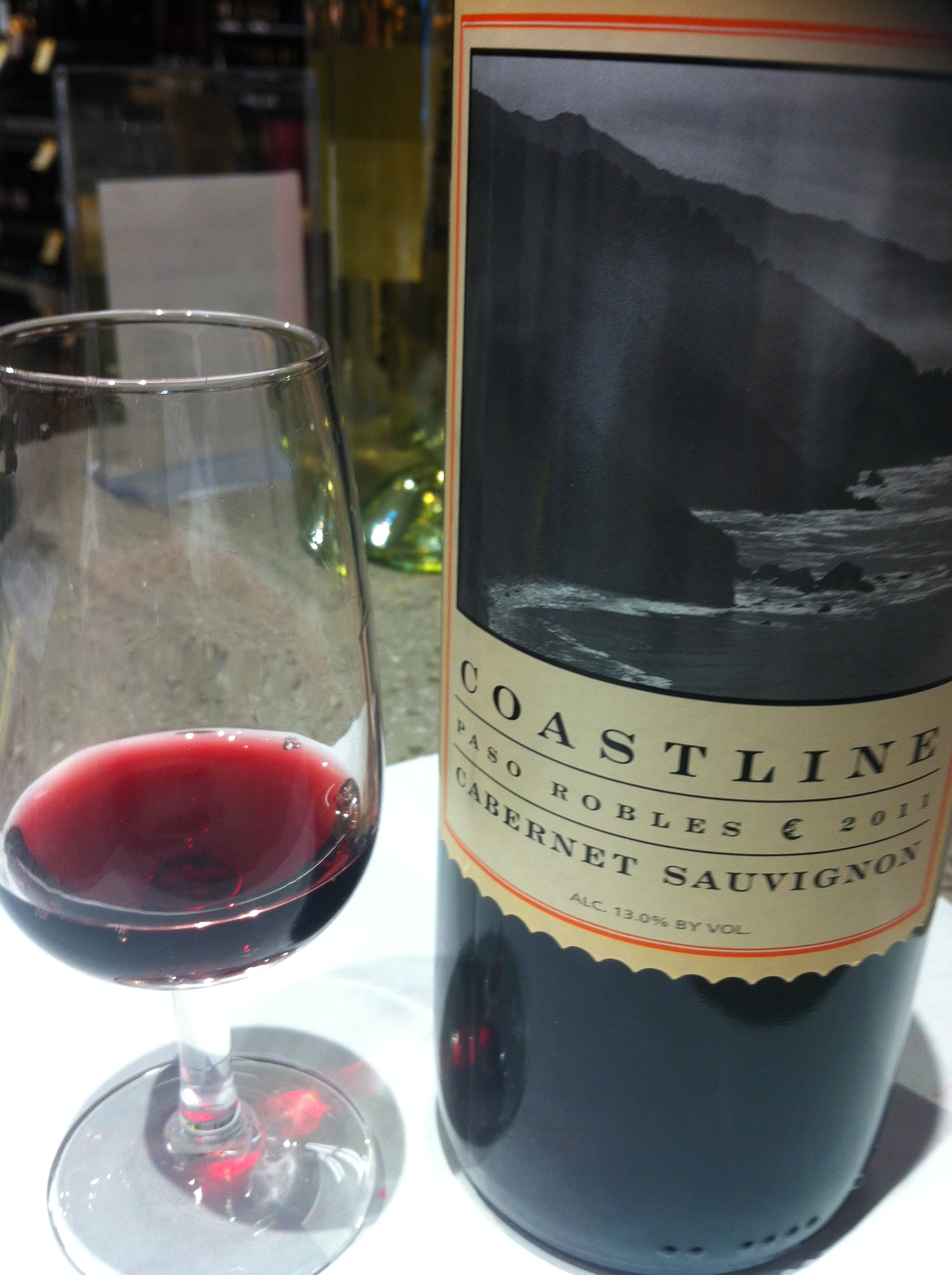
A Cabernet Sauvignon from the Paso Robles AVA produced by Adler Fels under their Coastline label.
