= Frank Ritter (psychologist) =

Frank Ritter is a professor in the College of Information Sciences and Technology, professor in the Department of Psychology, and professor in the Department of Computer Science and Engineering at Penn State University. Before coming to Penn State, he was a lecturer (approximately equivalent to US assistant professor) in the Department of Psychology at the University of Nottingham, and a visiting distinguished professor in the Psychology Department at Chemnitz University of Technology (Germany).

He has published more than 100 articles and conference papers, and edited several books in the area of cognitive modeling, cognitive architectures, human-computer interaction, and learning. He coedited the proceedings of a conference on cognitive modeling and a special issue of the International Journal of Human Computer Studies on cognitive models as users. He is on the editorial board of Proceedings of the Human Factors and Ergonomics Society and Artificial Intelligence and the Simulation of Behaviour Quarterly. He is a series editor for The Oxford Series on Cognitive Models and Architectures.

== Background ==
Ritter received a Bachelor of Science in electrical engineering from University of Illinois at Urbana-Champaign, a master's degree in psychology from Carnegie Mellon University, and a Doctor of Philosophy in artificial intelligence and psychology from the Carnegie-Mellon University. Ritter has received study fellowships from the United States Air Force Office of Scientific Research, and the European Science Foundation's program on Learning in Humans and Machines.

== Research ==
Ritter directs The Applied Cognitive Science Lab at Penn State University. He studies cognitive modelling, cognitive architectures, human computer interaction, and learning. His research has been funded by the US Office of Navy Research, the United States Air Force Office of Scientific Research, DARPA, the Defence Evaluation and Research Agency (U.K.), and the U.K. Joint Council Initiative on Cognitive Science and Human Computer Interaction, as well as corporations in the U.S. and Europe.

His contribution in the cognitive modelling has been widely acknowledged. He received the Best Paper award, at the 16th Conference on Behavior Representation in Modeling and Simulation in 2007. Another of his papers was selected as "Siegel-Wolf Award Winner for best applied modeling paper" at the International Conference on Cognitive Modeling in 2004.

Also he has created several Web sites, one of which, the Soar-FAQ, won an award for being frequently cited. He has created software, tutorials, and methodology for cognitive modeling, particularly with Soar and ACT-R.

== Selected publications ==
- Ritter, F. E., J. Nerb, J., T. O'Shea, T., E. Lehtinen, Editors. (2007). In order to learn: How the Sequence of Topics Influences Learning. 256 pages. Oxford University Press.
- St. Amant, R., T. E. Horton, F. E. Ritter. (2007). "Model-based Evaluation of Expert Cell Phone Menu Interaction". Transactions on CHI. Volume 14, Issue 1, Article 1.
- Ritter, F. E., A. R. Freed, O. Haskett. (2005). "User Information Needs: The Case of University Department Web Sites". ACM Interactions 12(5):19–27.
- Ritter, F. E., Shadbolt, N. R., Elliman, D., Young, R., Gobet, F., and Baxter, G. D.(2003) "Techniques for modeling human performance in synthetic environments: A supplementary review". Wright–Patterson Air Force Base, OH: Human Systems Information Analysis Center.
- Ritter, F. E., G. D. Baxter, G. Jones, R. M. Young. (2000). "Supporting Cognitive Models as Users". ACM Transactions on Computer–Human Interactions 7(2):141–173.

== Personal life ==
Ritter is listed in the 2001 edition of Guinness World Records as having the world's largest collection of crisp packets with 683.
