= Samuel Simeon Fels =

American businessman (1860–1950)

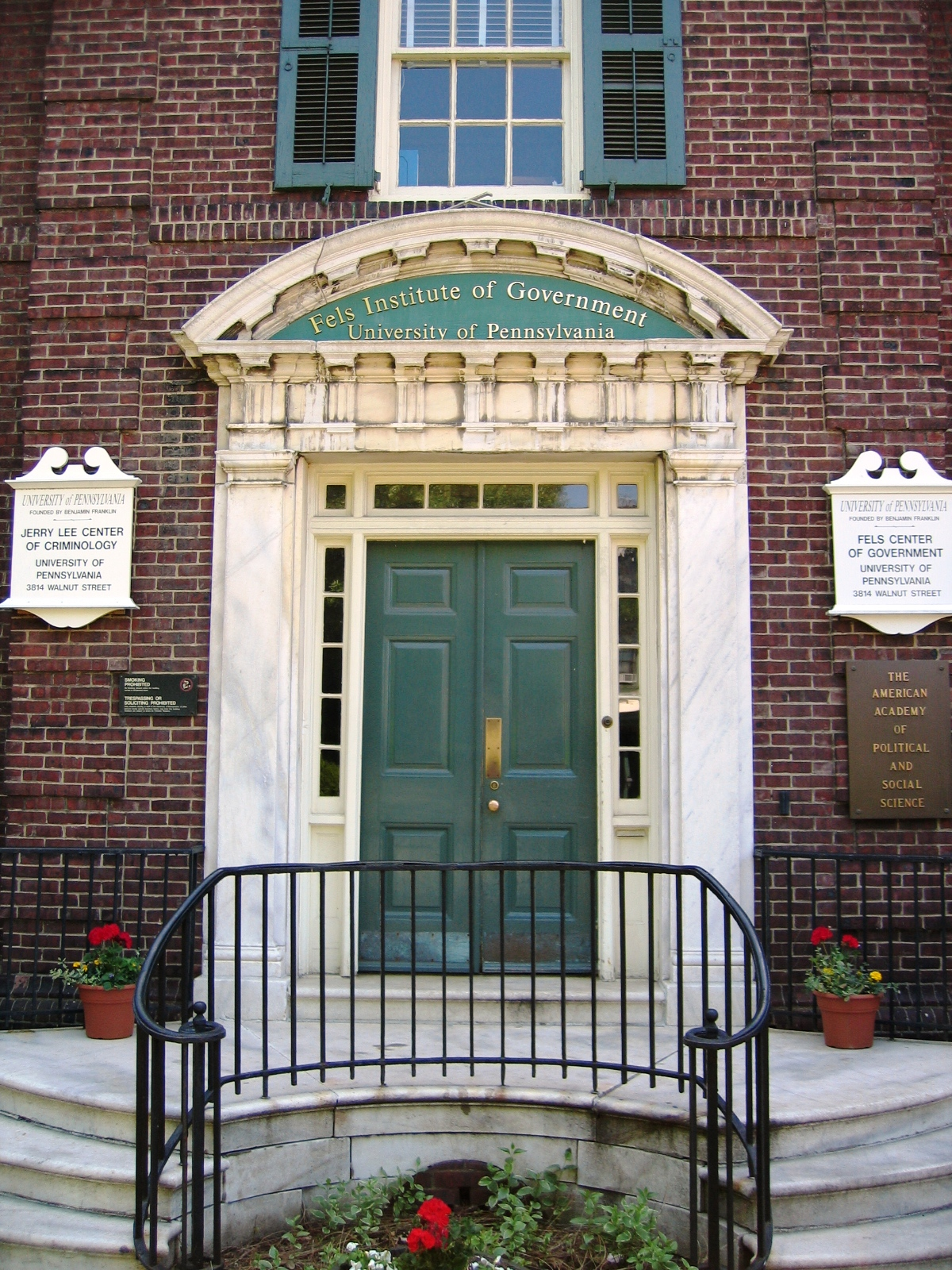
- Fels Institute of Government
- Born: February 16, 1860; Yanceyville, North Carolina, U.S.
- Died: June 23, 1950 (age 90); Philadelphia, Pennsylvania, U.S.
- Occupation: Soap manufacturer
- Spouse: Jennie May
- Family: Joseph Fels (brother)

Samuel Simeon Fels (February 16, 1860 – June 23, 1950) was an American businessman and philanthropist.

== Biography ==
Born to a Jewish family in Yanceyville, North Carolina, Fels family relocated to Philadelphia, where Samuel's older brother Joseph Fels founded a soap manufacturing company, Fels & Co., which found success with the product Fels-Naptha. Samuel became the company's first president, a post he held until his death at age 90.

Fels was elected to the American Philosophical Society in 1939.

== Philanthropy ==
An active philanthropist, Fels helped to establish the Committee of Seventy in 1904, for political reform in Philadelphia. The city was often portrayed in the popular press of the time as "a city mired in corruption".

in 1936, Fels established the Samuel S. Fels Fund, which provides support to Philadelphia-area non-profit organizations. In 1937, his West Philadelphia mansion was given to the University of Pennsylvania, for the foundation of the Fels Institute of Government.

Fels is known for commissioning Samuel Barber's Violin Concerto Op. 14 in 1939.

In 1912, Henry H. Goddard dedicated his book on eugenics The Kallikak Family to Fels: "who made this study and who has followed the work from its incipiency with kindly criticism and advice".
