= Fels-Naptha =

American laundry soap

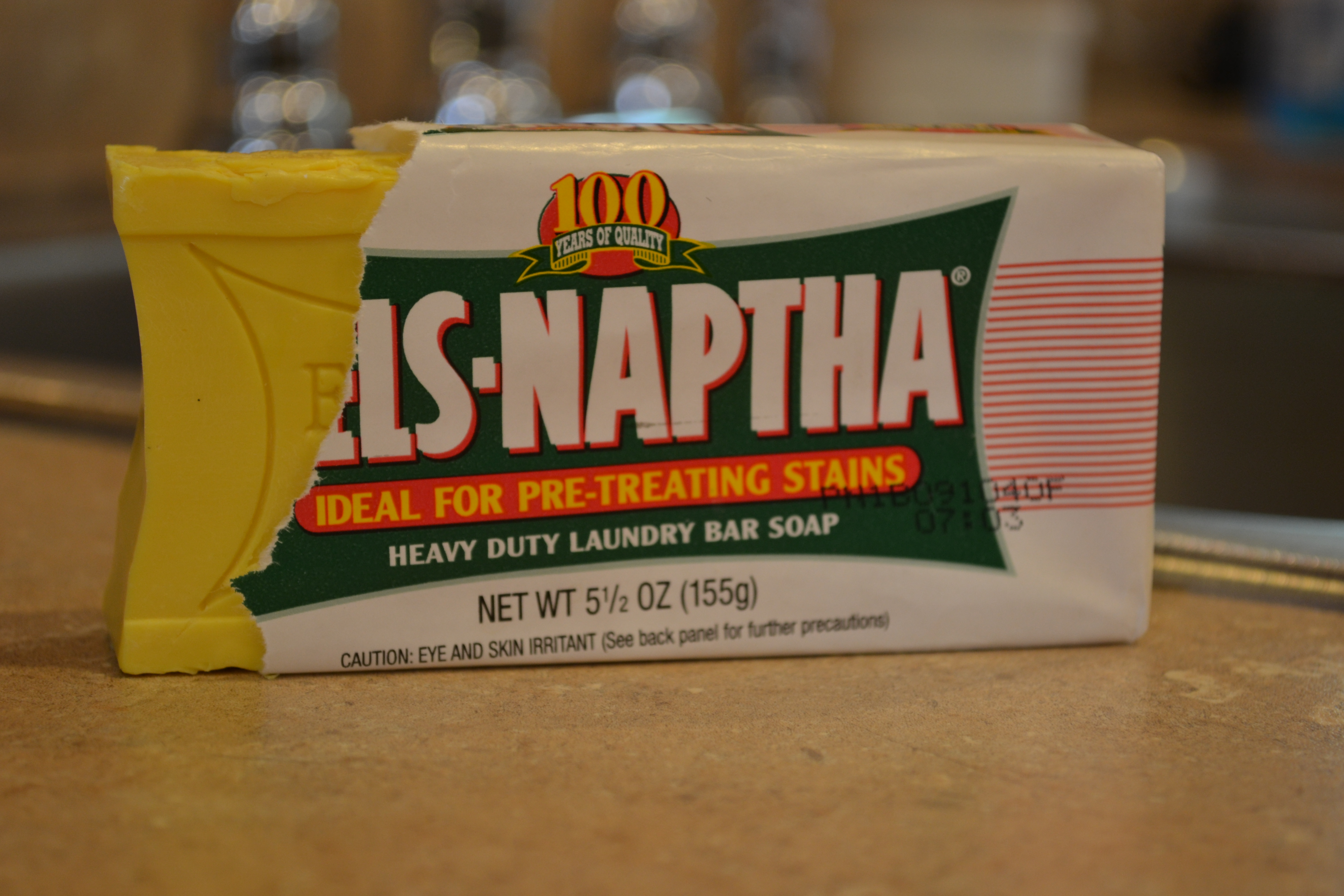
- Product type: Laundry detergent
- Current owner: Summit Brands
- Introduced: 1893; 133 years ago
- Markets: United States; Canada
- Previous owners: Fels & Company (1893–1964); Purex Industries, Inc. (1964–85); The Dial Corporation (1985–2003); Henkel (2003–22)
- Website: https://summitbrands.com/

Fels-Naptha is an American brand of laundry soap manufactured by Summit Brands.

Invented in 1893 by Fels and Company, it originally included the ingredient naphtha, effective for cleaning laundry and removing urushiol (an oil contained in poison ivy).

== History ==
The original Fels-Naptha was developed around 1894 by Fels & Company of Philadelphia, a Philadelphia-based company. Its predecessor Fels & Company, was established by Lazarus Fels and son Abraham in 1866 in Baltimore, Maryland, but unexpectedly failed after some period of success.

The Fels family moved to Philadelphia, where another of Lazarus' sons, Joseph, started the new firm and incorporated in 1914. Joseph's younger brother Samuel Simeon Fels was the new company's first president and held that position until he died in 1950.

In the early 20th century, the company prospered based on sales of Fels-Naptha. Both Joseph and Samuel used their new wealth for philanthropy.

In 1964, the company was sold to Purex Corporation for $5 million. The Greyhound Corporation acquired the consumer products business of Purex (which included Fels-Naptha) in 1985 and was combined with Greyhound's Armour-Dial division, forming The Dial Corporation.

In December 2003, Dial was sold to Henkel for $2.9 billion. In September 2022, Summit Brands acquired Fels-Naptha from Henkel.

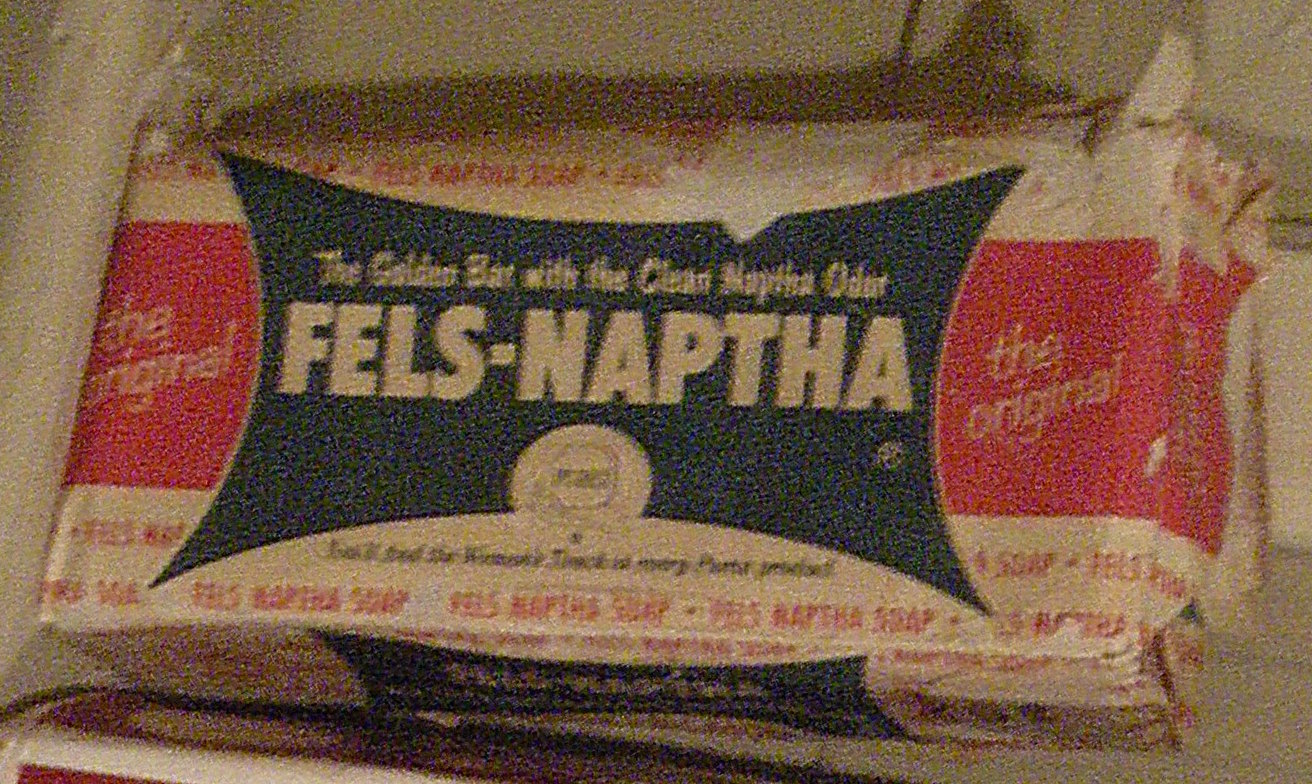
Fels-Naptha

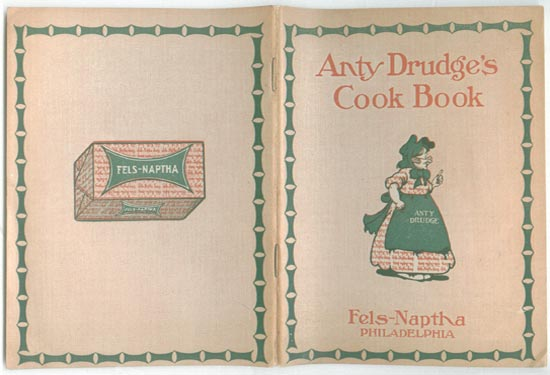
Advertising pamphlet published by Naptha

== Use ==
The soap comes packaged in paper similar to bar body soap and is most often found in the laundry section of a supermarket or grocery store. It is intended for the pre-treatment of stains by rubbing the dampened product on a soiled area prior to laundering. The manufacturer claims it to be most effective in removing chocolate, baby formula, perspiration, and make-up.

It was often used as a home remedy in the treatment of contact dermatitis caused by exposure to poison ivy, poison oak, and other oil-based organic skin-irritants where they have touched the skin but not yet inflamed the area. When the soap contained its namesake naphtha, washing the skin directly with the soap helped remove urushiol, the allergen associated with poison ivy. As with other strong detergents, the revised formulation retains this capability.

According to the manufacturer, about 1/8 of a bar of Fels-Naptha grated and added to a wash cycle helps eliminate residual stains.

Fels-Naptha is also a common ingredient in DIY laundry detergent recipes.

Fels-Naptha, when combined with neatsfoot oil, is commonly used in a primitive method of tanning animal skins.

== Health considerations ==
In its 2007 material safety data sheet, Dial Corp. states that Fels-Naptha can irritate the eyes and, with prolonged exposure, the skin.

Fels-Naptha once contained naphtha, a skin and eye irritant. According to the ingredients list on the Fels-Naptha website, it is no longer included in the soap. Instead, it now contains terpene hydrocarbons.

== See also ==
- Zote (soap)
- List of cleaning products
