= B.M.S. College of Engineering =

Engineering college in Bangalore, Karnataka, India

- Motto: Libertas Per Veritatem
- Motto in English: Freedom Through Truth
- Type: Private
- Established: 1946; 80 years ago
- Founder: B. M. Sreenivasaiah
- Affiliations: Visvesvaraya Technological University
- Principal: Bheemsha Arya
- Total staff: 500+
- Undergraduates: 10000
- Postgraduates: 1500
- Location: Bangalore, Karnataka, India; 12.94°N 77.57°E
- Campus: 11 acres; Urban
- Approvals: AICTE
- Colors: Blue and White
- Nicknames: BMSians, BMS
- Mascot: Bull
- Website: bmsit.ac.in bmsce.ac.in
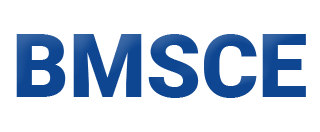

- Located on the Bull Temple Road in Basavanagudi, Bangalore

B.M.S. College of Engineering, or Bhusanayana Mukundadas Sreenivasaiah College of Engineering (BMSCE), is a private engineering college in Basavanagudi, Bangalore, India. It was started in 1946 by Bhusanayana Mukundadas Sreenivasaiah and is run by the B.M.S. Educational Trust. It is affiliated with Visvesvaraya Technological University and became autonomous in 2008. BMSCE is located on Bull Temple Road, Basavanagudi, diagonally opposite the famous Bull Temple. Though a private college, it is partially funded by the Government of Karnataka.

BMS College of Engineering (BMSCE) offers 14 undergraduate and 15 postgraduate courses in both conventional and emerging fields. Fourteen of its departments are recognized as research centers offering PhD and M.Sc degrees in science, engineering, and management. At present, over 350 research scholars are pursuing their PhD degrees in these centers, and 160 PhDs have been produced so far. BMSCE is an autonomous institution that has been approved by the All India Council for Technical Education (AICTE) and the University Grants Commission (UGC). The institution has been practicing outcome-based education since 2008. It is the first institution in Karnataka to be accredited by the National Board of Accreditation (NBA) in Tier I format, and it has recently received an "A++" grade from the National Assessment and Accreditation Council (NAAC) under Cycle II.

The institution is a recipient of the Ministry of Human Resource Development (MHRD) Scheme on Global Initiative of Academic Network (GIAN) and the National Doctoral Fellowship (NDF) – AICTE since 2018–19. BMSCE has a student population of approximately 6,000, which is one of the largest student populations among engineering colleges in Karnataka. The college has modern classrooms, and a wi-fi enabled campus with 24x7 internet facilities.

BMSCE claims an alumni network of over 24,000 members.

== History ==
BMSCE was founded in 1946 by B. M. Sreenivasaiah with three undergraduate courses in mechanical, civil, and electrical engineering, as the first private sector initiative in engineering education in India. B. M. Sreenivasaiah was followed by his son B. S. Narayan.

In 2024, suspicions were raised about irregularities in admission at the College for computer science seats. In June 2025, the College, along with the Akash Institute of Engineering and Technology, and the New Horizon College of Engineering was raided by officials from the Directorate of Enforcement to search for evidence connected to a suspected seat-blocking scandal related to student admissions for the 2024-2025 academic year.

== Academic profile ==
=== Admission ===
==== Undergraduate ====
Students are admitted to undergraduate courses on basis of their performance in either Karnataka Common Entrance Test, or in the COMED-K test. There is a lateral entry scheme in place, by which students holding diploma degrees can enter directly to the second year of study in engineering. Students, upon graduating, receive a Bachelor of Engineering degree.

==== Graduate ====
Students are admitted to postgraduate courses on basis of their GATE test scores, as well as on their Post Graduate Karnataka CET scores. Students, upon graduating, receive a Master of Computer Applications (M.C.A.) or Master of Technology (M.Tech.) degree. They also offer a Master of Business Administration (MBA) degree.

=== Rankings ===
College rankings

General – India
- NIRF (Overall) (2023): 83

Engineering – India
- NIRF (2023): 39
- NIRF (2024): 100 to 150 band

BMSCE was ranked 100 to 150 band by the National Institutional Ranking Framework (NIRF) engineering ranking in 2024.

== Departments and courses ==
=== Undergraduate ===
These departments offer four-year undergraduate courses in engineering. All of the undergraduate courses have been conferred autonomous status by the Visvesvaraya Technological University. The following programmes are offered: Aerospace Engineering, Bio-technology, Chemical Engineering, Civil Engineering. Computer Science, Electronics and Communication Engineering, Electrical And Electronics Engineering, Industrial Engineering and Management, Information Science, Electronics and Instrumentation Engineering, Artificial intelligence and Machine learning, Mechanical Engineering, Medical Electronics and Electronics and Telecommunication Engineering. The allied departments of the college are the departments of Physics, Chemistry, Mathematics, Humanities along with the placement and training department.

=== Postgraduate ===
Master of Computer Applications (M.C.A.), Master of Technology (M.Tech.) offered by departments of Computer science, Information science, Mechanical and Electronics and Communication Engineering. They offer a Master of Business Administration (MBA) course as well.

== Scholarships ==
BMSCE Scholarships are provided for the students based on merit and who need financial support. Students can also avail scholarships based on sports performance. Both private and government scholarships are available. Students need to apply for the scholarships based on eligibility. Some of the scholarships are listed below.

=== Government Scholarships ===
1. DBCM Scholarship
2. National Merit Scholarship
3. Karnataka Minorities Scholarship
4. Defense Scholarship
5. Govt. of India Scholarship for disabled students.
6. Karnataka state of walk f Board Scholarship (for Muslim girls)

=== Private Scholarships ===
1. SBM Employee welfare Scholarship
2. Kadambri Trust Scholarship
3. G.B.S Trust Scholarship
4. Brahmin Trust Scholarship
5. Ramakrishna Math Scholarship
6. H A L Employee welfare Scholarship

== Research and Development Centre ==
R and D Center involves in identifying new research areas, developing projects leading to publications in national/international journals and conferences. Established an RandD centre at the institution level to promote research and innovation among the faculty and students. The centre helps in developing co-operative and complementary research among various departments under BMSCE to explore advanced technologies. The centre acts as the liaison between the university (VTU and Mangalore University) and the research centres at BMSCE. The centre also guides and facilitates in writing of project proposals, and scientific papers leading to publication as well as in identifying the research outcomes of research for filing patents.

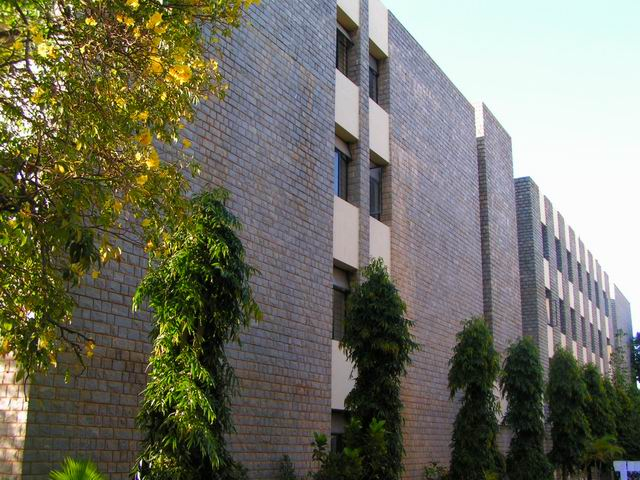
Mechanical, Industrial and Aerospace Building

These research labs help the students to build prototypes which enable them to participate in competitions both in India and abroad.

== Student Life ==
In October 2014, a student committed suicide on campus. In January 2025 another student died by suicide on campus.

=== Utsav Annual Cultural Fest ===
Utsav is the cultural and signature festival of the BMS College of Engineering. It is usually held towards the end of August every year. Started in 1973 by a group of students, it has attracted considerable media attention and numerous sponsors over time. There are participants from institutes in other states like IIT Madras and IIT Bombay. Some of the events that pulled the crowds on day two were the rock concert and gaming competitions. Bands like Parousia, Escher's Knot, The Bicycle Days, All the Fat Children, Requiem and Solder were among those that entertained the city's rock music fans. The fest also features events like western and Indian dances, quizzes, technical events, theatre, Mad Ads, face painting, debate, dumb charades and rangoli. There are also stalls selling products made by BMSCE students. The money obtained by selling the products will be donated to Navachetana Trust, an NGO.

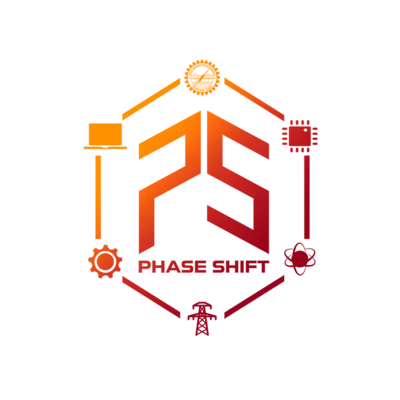
Official Phase Shift Tech fest logo of 2021

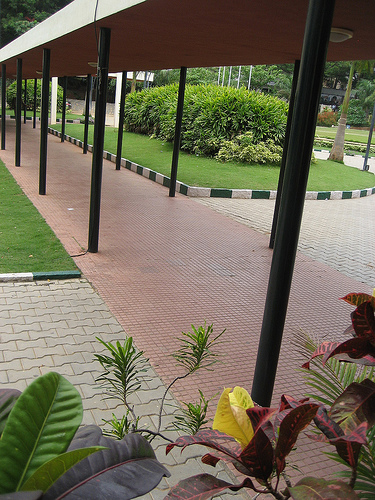
Corridor from Old Computer Science block to the BMS College of Architecture

== Accreditation ==
The college was accredited by National Assessment and Accreditation Council (NAAC) with an A++ in the Second Cycle : with a CGPA of 3.83 on a scale of four which is highest in the country. The re-accreditation status is valid from 28 March 2019 to 28 March 2024. It is accredited by National Assessment and Accreditation Council (NAAC) with A++ grade. Most of the college courses are accredited by the National Board of Accreditation (NBA). The college is affiliated with Visvesvaraya Technological University.

== Notable alumni ==
Notable BMSCE alumni include:
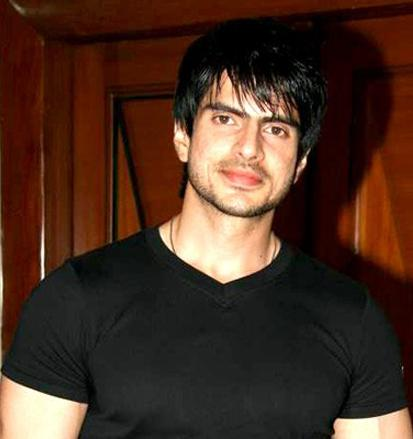
Rahil Azam, Indian Television actor known his role in series Hatim

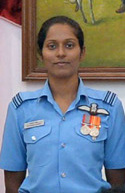
Bhawana Kanth, One of the first female fighter pilots of the Indian Air Force

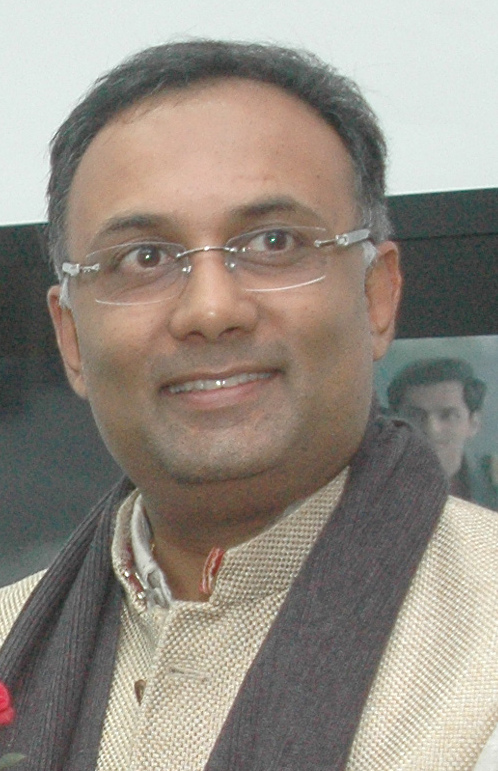
Dinesh Gundu Rao, Member of Karnataka Legislative Assembly

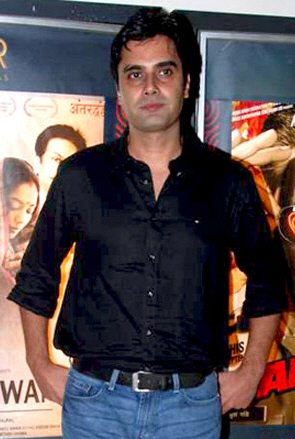
Raj Singh Chaudhary, Indian actor and screenwriter in Bollywood
