= List of postgraduate-only institutions =

The following is a list of brick-and-mortar institutions that award only postgraduate or graduate qualifications.

== By specialisation ==
Some postgraduate-only institutions are specialised in a particular sector.

=== Business ===
- ESCP Business School
- Hult Ashridge Business School
- INSEAD
- London Business School

=== Law ===
- Inns of Court
- University of California, Hastings College of the Law

=== Medicine and health ===
- Albert Einstein College of Medicine
- A.T. Still University
- Graduate University for Advanced Studies
- Institute of Cancer Research
- Liverpool School of Tropical Medicine
- London School of Hygiene & Tropical Medicine
- Mayo Clinic College of Medicine and Science
- Medical College of Wisconsin
- Northeast Ohio Medical University
- Rockefeller University
- University of California, San Francisco
- Western University of Health Sciences

=== Military ===
- Air Force Institute of Technology
- Joint Special Operations University
- National Defense University
- Naval Postgraduate School
- Naval War College
- U.S. Army War College

=== Social sciences ===
- College of Europe
- European University Institute
- Frederick S. Pardee RAND Graduate School
- Graduate Institute of International and Development Studies
- Institute of World Politics
- School of Advanced Study

== By country ==
=== Bangladesh ===
- Bangladesh Medical University

=== Belgium ===
- College of Europe

=== Brazil ===
- National Institute for Pure and Applied Mathematics (IMPA)

=== France ===
- INSEAD
- IFP School

=== India ===
- Indian Institute of Social Welfare and Business Management
- Government Institute of Science, Aurangabad
- M S Ramaiah School of Advanced Studies
- University of Hyderabad

=== Iran ===
- Graduate University of Advanced Technology
- Institute for Cognitive Science Studies
- Institute for Research in Fundamental Sciences
- Tarbiat Modares University

=== Israel ===
- Weizmann Institute of Science

=== Japan ===
- International University of Japan
- The Graduate University for Advanced Studies
- Japan Advanced Institute of Science and Technology
- Nara Institute of Science and Technology
- National Graduate Institute for Policy Studies
- Okinawa Institute of Science and Technology

=== Poland ===
- College of Europe

=== Singapore ===
- INSEAD

=== South Korea ===
- KDI School of Public Policy and Management
- aSSIST: Seoul School of Integrated Science and Technology
- Reformed Theological Seminary
- Transnational Law and Business University
- Chonnam National University Law School

=== Switzerland ===
- European Graduate School
- Graduate Institute of International and Development Studies

=== Tanzania ===
- Nelson Mandela African Institution of Science and Technology (NM-AIST)

=== Thailand ===
- Asian Institute of Technology
- Chulabhorn Graduate Institute
- National Institute of Development Administration

=== United Kingdom ===
The Higher Education Statistics Agency (HESA) reports on the number of students and the number of qualifications awarded at various levels. Institutions that awarded no first-degree level qualifications and more than 50 postgraduate-level qualifications in 2023–24 are listed below. With the exception of the Royal College of Art, which offers graduate diplomas, they had zero undergraduate-level qualifications. Postgraduate colleges of collegiate universities are not listed here, although postgraduate institutions of federal universities are.

Student numbers are as given by HESA except for the School of Advanced Studies, which is included under University of London (institutes and activities) by HESA rather than listed separately, where the numbers are taken from their annual metrics report. Sotheby's Institute of Art have a small number of undergraduates included in their HESA student number returns for 2023/24; as of 2025, the only undergraduate programme at the institute is a for-credit summer programme for undergraduates at other institutions. HESA student numbers (all institutions except the School of Advanced Studies) are rounded to the nearest five, which can lead to apparent inconsistencies between the number of taught and research students and the total.

Most of the postgraduate-only institutions in the UK are small, with only three having over 1,000 students in 2023-24. Around half are teaching-focussed, with no postgraduate research students in 2023-24. A large majority of them are specialist institutions

Postgraduate-only institutions in the UK
Institution	Number of taught postgraduate students (2023-24)	Number of postgraduate research students (2023-24)	Total number of postgraduate students (2023-24)
Cranfield University	3,750	880	4,630
Royal College of Art	2,550 (+ 170 GradDip)	130	2,680 (+ 170 GradDip)
London Business School	2,155	100	2,255
London School of Hygiene & Tropical Medicine	555	425	980
ESCP Business School	830	0	830
National Film and Television School	565	0	565
Centre for Alternative Technology	525	0	525
London Film School	315	0	315
School of Advanced Study (University of London)	119	153	272
Inns of Court	360	0	360
Institute of Cancer Research	150	200	345
Liverpool School of Tropical Medicine	180	70	245
Sotheby's Institute of Art (listed as Institute of Art – London)	145	0	145

=== United States ===
- A.T. Still University
- Adler Graduate School
- Adler University
- Air Force Institute of Technology
- Albert Einstein College of Medicine
- Fielding Graduate University
- Claremont Graduate University (Claremont Colleges)
- Erikson Institute
- Frederick S. Pardee RAND Graduate School
- The Institute of World Politics
- Joint Special Operations University
- Keck Graduate Institute (Claremont Colleges)
- Moss Landing Marine Laboratories (California State University)
- Maryland University of Integrative Health
- Mayo Clinic College of Medicine and Science
- National Defense University
- Naval Postgraduate School
- Naval War College
- Northeast Ohio Medical University
- Professional School of Psychology
- Rockefeller University
- Salk Institute for Biological Studies
- Scripps Research
- Toyota Technological Institute at Chicago
- U.S. Army War College
- University of California College of the Law, San Francisco (formerly University of California, Hastings College of the Law)
- University of California, San Francisco
