= M. R. Seetharam =

Indian politician

M.R. Seetharam
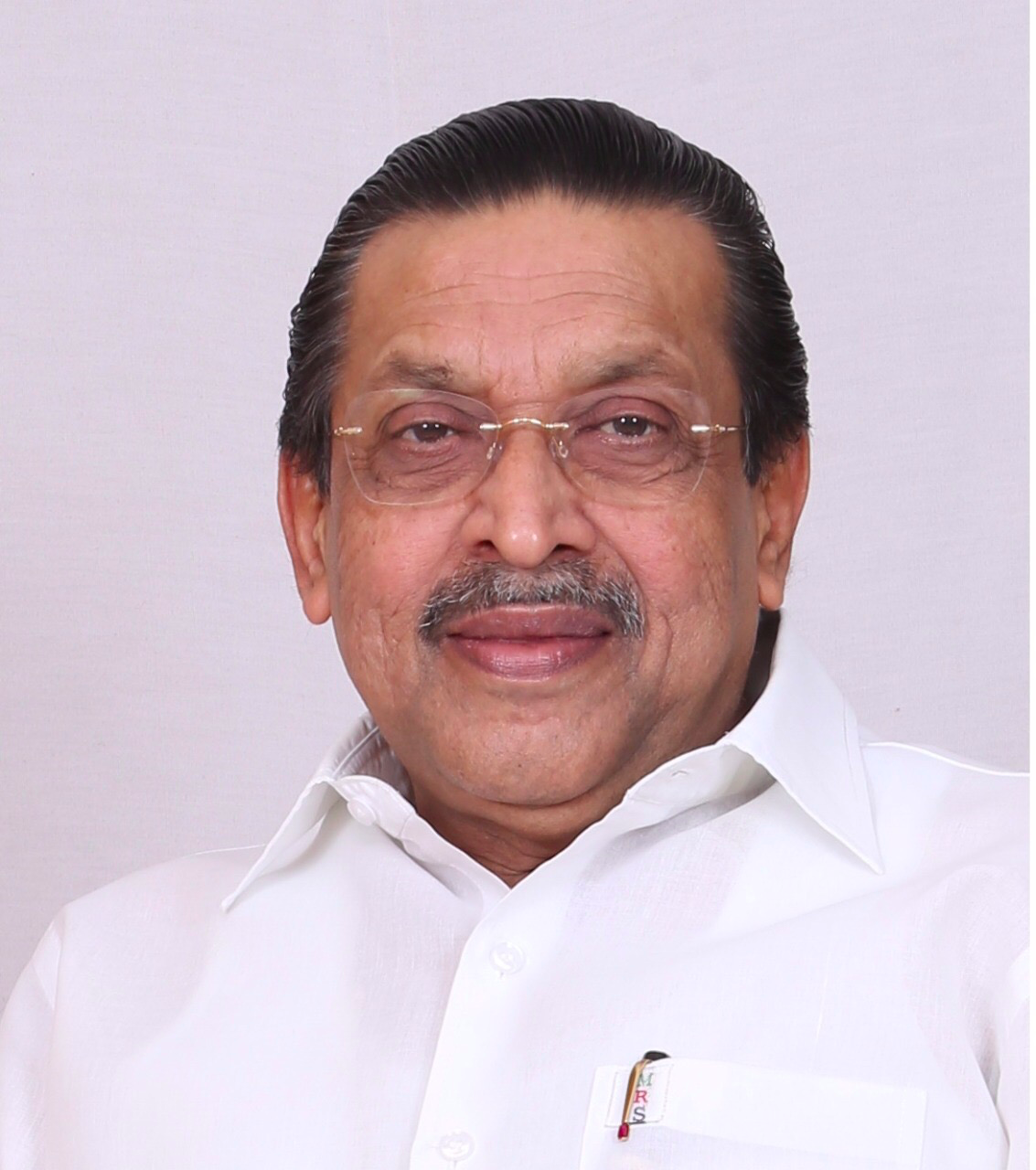
- Minister for Statistics, Planning, Science and Technology (2016-2018)

Member of Karnataka Legislative Council
- Incumbent
- Assumed office 21 August 2023
- Preceded by: P. R. Ramesh
- Constituency: Nominated
- In office 2012–2018
- Succeeded by: Aravind Kumar Arali
- Constituency: elected by MLAs

Member of Karnataka Legislative Assembly
- In office 1999–2008
- Preceded by: Anant Nag
- Succeeded by: C. N. Ashwath Narayan
- Constituency: Malleshwaram

Personal details
- Born: 4 April 1956 (age 70) Bengaluru
- Party: Indian National Congress
- Spouse: Shruthy Seetharam
- Children: Raksha Ramaiah & Sundar Ram

M. R. Seetharam is an Indian politician, entrepreneur, educationist and philanthropist from the state of Karnataka. He was nominated as a member of Legislative Council in 2012. He was the Minister for Planning, Statistics, Science and Technology in the Congress state Government.

He is also the Vice-Chairman of Gokula Education Foundation and Director of M.S. Ramaiah Institute of Technology, M.S. Ramaiah Polytechnic and M.S. Ramaiah Hostels.

M.R. Seetharam has worked towards preserving the parks and lung spaces in his constituency. He has also implemented the Government's Self Employment Schemes like Antyodaya, Akshara Dasoha and Yeshaswini Co-operate Health Schemes.

== Early life and family ==
M. R. Seetharam was born on 4 April 1956, Bengaluru, Karnataka. He is the son of late Dr. M. S. Ramaiah, one of the pioneers in Education and Healthcare in Karnataka who founded the Gokula Education Foundation (GEF). He received his primary education from St. Joseph's School. He holds a graduate degree in Science from St. Joseph's College.

He is married to Shruthy Seetharam who is a homemaker and is actively involved in social activities involving the poor and needy. He has two children, the elder son Raksha Ramaiah is a member of Indian Youth Congress holding the post of Vice President, Bangalore Urban District. His younger son Sundar Ram is also an office bearer in IYC holding the post of General Secretary, Malleswaram Assembly constituency.

== Political life ==
M.R. Seetharam started his political journey as the president of the Students Governing Council in St. Joseph's College.

He entered mainstream politics by joining the Indian National Congress and started off by serving as an executive member of Karnataka Pradesh Congress (I) Sevadal in 1986. He was appointed the Treasurer of Karnataka Pradesh Congress (I) from the year 1989 – 1992 and KPCC Sevadal from 1992 – 1996. He was elected as a member of KPCC in the year 1997.

M.R. Seetharam fought his first election in the year 1999. He won the Malleshwaram Constituency defeating his JD(U) rival Raghupathy M with a margin of 20,000 votes. This was the first time Congress won a seat from Malleshwaram Assembly Constituency after Independence. He won the next assembly election from Malleswaram in the year 2004 defeating his BJP rival Dr. C.N. Ashwath Narayan with a margin of 11,000 votes. In 2008, he lost the Malleshwaram constituency elections to his nearest rival.

From 1997 – 2000, he was the In-charge to run the party offices and also the In-charge for Bengaluru division of Bengaluru Urban, Rural, Kolar, Tumkur, Shimoga, Davanagere, Chitradurga, Mysuru, Haveri districts for the Zilla Parishad elections 2000.

M.R. Seetharam was elected AICC member in the year 2001. While serving as an MLA of Malleswaram, INC won five out of seven wards of Malleswaram assembly in the BBMP elections held on 11 November 2001.

M.R. Seetharam has worked as Member of the KPCC Campaign Committee 2013 for the Congress party candidates in the districts of Kolar, Tumkur, Bengaluru Rural, Bengaluru Urban and Bengaluru City for the Assembly elections.

In the year 2016 he was sworn in as Cabinet Minister for Planning, Statistics, Science and Technology and also Incharge Minister for Kodagu District Govt of Karnataka.

== Contributions and Initiatives ==
1999 – 2003

- Provided permanent houses to more than 300 Sikh immigrants
- Distributed hundreds of auto rickshaws under self-employment scheme to the youth
- Renovated and developed Parsi Garden Slum
- Distributed hundreds of sewing machines to trained women and granted stipend to women trained in embroidery
- Development and rejuvenation of Sankey Tank Garden along with a joggers pathway through his own contribution

2004 – 2008

- During his second term as MLA, he got 70 crore sanctioned from BBMP for the following developments:
  - Mattikere – Gokula Railway Overbridge
  - Malleshwaram Overbridge
  - Yeshwanthpur Overbridge which was opened to public from 1 May 2008
- He helped set up the BBMP computer training centre in Yeshwanthpur which provides free training to people. 75 percent of the trainees are women (homemakers) and girls. More than 800 people have been trained so far through this initiative. The salaries of instructors and for the maintenance is borne by M.R. Seetharam
- He contributed towards setting up Computer Labs in two P.U. Girls Colleges to impart technical education
- Opened Govt. Model School from MLA fund for underprivileged children
- Distributed free notebooks to 6 lakh students studying in government, aided and private schools in the assembly
- Distribution of Artificial Limbs and other necessary equipment for the handicapped
- Under the Valmiki Ambedkar Planning Project, Sunnadagoodu slum residents got pakka houses
- Supported blood donation and health camps across the state through M.S. Ramaiah Medical Institutions
- Provided thousands of scholarships to students from backward communities belonging to rural parts of the state

=== Achievements as the Planning Minister of Karnataka ===
- M.R Seetharam helped the evicted families to settle in Bayadagotta and Beserahalli of Somawarpet taluk and Kedanallur of Virajpet taluk. New layout was formed to locate them along with creation of Basic facilities such as housing, electrification, road, and drinking water facilities to rehabilitate them after they were forcefully evacuated by the Forest Department from Diddahalli village and Hoddur-palyamadu burial ground.
- Completed various projects like Bapuji center in Gudda Hosur, Public Park at Harangi Dam, "St.Annamma Church" at Virajpet, Post-metric Ladies Hostel at Chennagiri Basavanahalli and Morarji Desai-Residential School Buildings.
- Completed 48 War Soldiers Memorial-at Virajpet, which was built with the support of Kodava Samaja.
- Laid foundation for local bus stand and Zilla Panchayath Office at Madikeri.
- Laid foundation for the Science Centre in Kodagu.

=== Mobile Planetarium ===
In 2017, M.R. Seetharam launched the "Taare Zameen Par" mobile planetarium initiative. The programme operates five mobile vans that travel across the state to provide astronomy education to students in rural areas. The initiative was described as the first of its kind in India at the time of its launch.

With only seven fixed planetariums across the country, access to such facilities has been limited for students in semi-urban and rural regions. The mobile planetarium programme was established to extend that access more broadly, offering students an interactive introduction to astronomy.

== Positions and Representations ==
- Minister for Planning, Statistics, Science and Technology Government of Karnataka 2016–2018
- In-charge Minister for Kodagu District, Government of Karnataka
- Member of Legislative Council(MLC) 2012, Government of Karnataka
- Elected as MLA from Malleshwaram Constituency in 1999 and 2004
- Treasurer of Congress Legislature Party 1999, 2008-2009
- Member of the Subject Committee of Karnataka Legislature for the Housing & Urban Development
- Member of the Subject Committee of Karnataka Legislature for the Health & Family Welfare Department
- Member of Karnataka Postal Circle from Karnataka Legislature
- Member of Public Undertaking Committee in the Karnataka Legislature 1997 – 2007
- Nominated to Academic Council Member to Bengaluru University in 2004
- Elected as AICC Member in 2001 and 2007
- General Secretary KPCC 1997 – 2002
