= M S Ramaiah School of Advanced Studies =

- Motto: Ignite Minde
- Type: Private
- Active: 1999–2013
- Chairman: Dr. M. R. Jayram
- Director: Dr. S. R. Shankapal
- Administrative staff: 170
- Postgraduates: 900
- Address: #470-P, Peenya Industrial Area, 4th Phase, Peenya, Bengaluru – 560 058., Bangalore, Karnataka, India

M S Ramaiah School of Advanced Studies (MSRSAS), (now M S Ramaiah University of Applied Sciences) was a post graduate engineering school located in Bangalore, India, established in 1999. The degrees offered are from Coventry University, UK, and are Master's Degree and Ph.D. programmes. The postgraduate programmes have been evolved by MSRSAS in association with Coventry University of UK and Indian and UK industries. In 2013, multiple Ramaiah institutions, including MSRSAS, were combined together to form MSRUAS.

== History ==
MSRSAS is part of the Gokula Education Foundation. The Foundation was started in 1962 by Sri. M. S. Ramaiah.

It offers courses like M.Sc.(Engineering) in 17 areas, engineering research leading to Ph.D. in six areas, Management studies MBA in Engineering Operations in collaboration with Coventry University of the UK.

MSRCASC is one of the institutes to be funded under TIFAC-CORE.

== Research ==
MSRSAS is an Associated Institution of Coventry University, offering a Doctoral programme since 2004. The Doctoral programme at MSRSAS leads to Ph.D. Degree of Coventry University, UK. It is offered as full-time or part-time. For eligibility to the programme a minimum of a second class master's degree in engineering from a good college/university is required. Candidates will be selected on the basis of available seats, but that is not the main issue if you provide proper amount of fees.

=== Sponsored and funded research ===
MSRSAS students normally work on research problems with funding from agencies. The research group also supervises Ph.D. theses. The areas of research are:

- Engineering Mechanics and Design
- Materials and Manufacturing Technology
- Fluid Flow and Energy Systems
- Biomedical Signal and Image Processing
- Signal Processing and Communication Engineering
- Digital Systems Design
- Industrial and Rural Product Design

MSRSAS also has School funded research projects and product development activities.

== Training and lifelong learning ==
The school offers the ACTP-Advanced Certificate Training programme, for fresh graduates. There are training courses for industry and module based training courses for those who would like to acquire skills in specific areas. In addition, 3–5 days duration corporate training courses and proficiency courses are offered.

=== Advanced certificate training programme ===
These are offered at different levels, each level is of 6 months duration. The school has developed these courses in association with industry.

- Signal Processing and Communication Technologies
- Embedded System Design
- MCAD
- Automotive Electronics
- VLSI-System Design

=== Modular training programme ===
- The school conducts modular training courses for graduates and working professionals in the areas of MCAD, VLSI, DSIP, Embedded System and Manufacturing. Each module is offered for a duration varying from 70 hours to 160 hours depending on the module.
- The school offers industry specific training programmes. The industry interested in a particular skill set formulates the curriculum in association with the faculty and involves itself in student/delegate induction.
- The Continuing Professional Development (CPD) programme is for working engineers, students and faculty from educational institutions.

=== Corporate training programme ===
The School conducts training programme for industry. Based on the expertise available in the School, the training programme is formulated and delivered to the requirement of the client. Many industries in India have used these services from MSRSAS.

== Technology business ==
=== TIFAC-TCFA ===
TIFAC (DST, Government of India), has launched a programme called TREMP {Technology Refinement and Marketing Planning} to help product innovators to commercialize their innovations through a number of TCFAs (Technology Commercialization Facilitation Agency). MSRSAS established a TCFA in June 2009.

=== Technology business incubation ===
MSRSAS has created facilities at its Peenya Campus to incubate technology business entrepreneurship and has plans to support budding entrepreneurs to realize their dream. The scheme is to support about 25-30 candidates in each batch with each candidate having a project idea and would like to become an entrepreneur but have the limitation of resources.

MSRSAS will provide work space varying from 500 to 1000 sft at low rent on its campus. On campus, product design, engineering design and analysis, simulation, circuits design and fabrication, simulation, prototyping, testing facilities both in the areas of mechanical engineering and electronic engineering are made available at low cost.

Working on the project idea and making it a commercial successes is the sole responsibility of the candidate. Each candidate will be given support at low cost for three years, after which the candidate will move off of the campus, making way for a new candidate.

=== Technology business support ===
In addition to incubating technology business MSRSAS is creating facilities at its Peenya Campus to support small high technology businesses which will help students of MSRSAS to get exposure to advanced technologies. Each business will be provided with 1000-2000 square feet. of work space on a rental basis. These businesses are required to hire MSRSAS students. The business can use campus facilities.

A similar named college appears in AICTE blacklist in KTK-14
