= Ramaiah Institute of Management =

Management college in Bangalore

Ramaiah Institute of Management (MSRIM)
- Motto: Service to Humanity is Service to God
- Type: Private business school
- Established: 1995; 31 years ago
- Founder: M. S. Ramaiah
- Affiliations: AICTE, National Board of Accreditation (NBA), Association of Indian Universities (AIU)
- Dean: Dr. Geetha Rajaram
- Administrative staff: Around 100
- Students: 600
- Postgraduates: 4000
- Location: Bangalore, Karnataka, India; 13°1′47.9″N 77°33′53.9″E
- Campus: Urban
- Colors
- Nickname: MSRIM
- Website: www.msrim.in

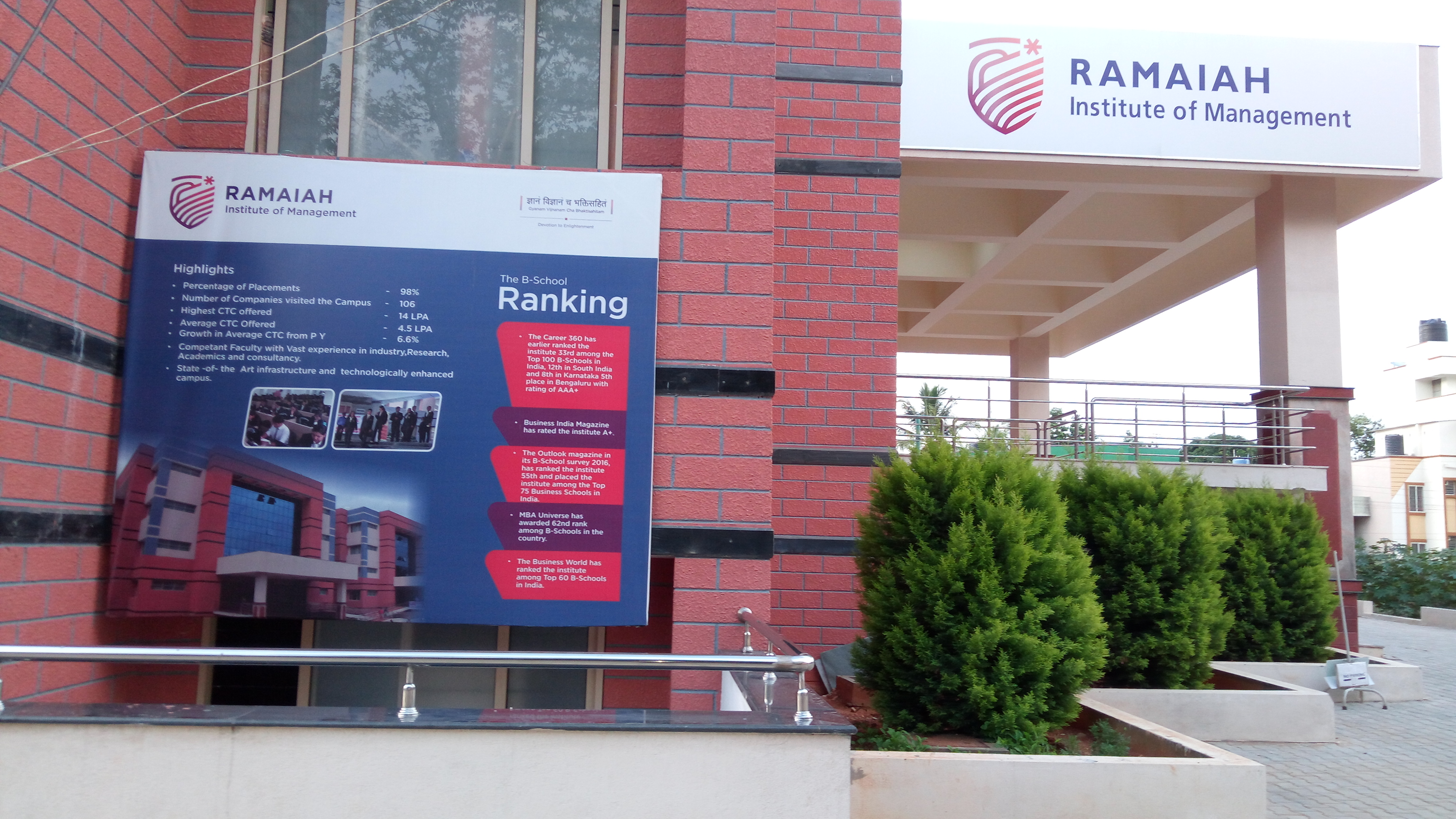
Ramaiah Institute of Management side view

Ramaiah Institute of Management is also known as M.S. Ramaiah Institute of Management (MSRIM), is an autonomous private management college located in Bangalore, Karnataka and headquartered at Mathikere, Karnataka, India. The college was established in the year 1995 and has been academically autonomous for postgraduate program. It offers postgraduate courses of study and research for Post Graduate Diploma in Management approved by All India Council for Technical Education (AICTE).

It offers Post Graduate programmes. The Post Graduate Diploma in Management (PGDM) is a two-year, full-time residential MBA programme. In addition to its main academic programmes, RIM is also engaged in facilitating research, offering consultant services, conducting seminar, academic conference and publishing journals.

== History ==
RIM was founded in 1995 by businessman M. S. Ramaiah. RIM is part of Gokula Education Foundation (GEF) which owns and manages several educational institutions across various streams under Ramaiah Group.

== Campus ==
The current campus is located in Mathikere, Bengaluru. Complete campus is spread across an area of more than 50-acres. College is having central library containing 16003 volume of books and 2886 Reference books. The institute has a 24-hour Internet connectivity with 200+ PCs and workstations. The campus is fully WiFi enabled. RIM has several hostels separately for girls and boys. The Institute organizes sports events to provide an opportunity for students to develop team building.

== Academics ==
RIM offers Post Graduate Diploma in Management at the Post Graduate level which is equivalent to MBA degree. The Program span over 2 years and is offered in 5 different specializations such as Finance, Marketing, Human Resource, Operations, BFSI. The Course structure is designed by the faculty of the college with the consultation of external faculty. The total intake of student in college is limited up to 300 by AICTE.

== Rankings ==
Institute rankings

Business/Management – India
- Private colleges
- Outlook India (2020): 76

Ramaiah Institute of Management has been ranked 76 in India among private management colleges by Outlook India in 2020 and 74 among management colleges in India by The Week in 2019.

== Annual fest ==
Every year in February or March RIM organizes a cultural fest named Perceptions. The students from different colleges participate in the two- to three-day event.
