= StudSat =

Indian student developed CubeSat

STUDSAT
- Mission type: Remote Sensing; Technology
- Operator: STUDSAT Consortium
- COSPAR ID: 2010-035B
- SATCAT no.: 36796
- Mission duration: 6 months (planned)

Spacecraft properties
- Spacecraft type: CubeSat
- Manufacturer: Consortium of 7 Engineering Colleges from Bangalore (4) and Hyderabad (3)
- Launch mass: 0.950 kg (2.09 lb)
- Dimensions: 10 cm x 10 cm x 13.5 cm

Start of mission
- Launch date: 12 July 2010, 03:52:00 UTC
- Rocket: Polar Satellite Launch Vehicle (PSLV-C15)
- Launch site: Satish Dhawan, FLP
- Contractor: ISRO

End of mission
- Last contact: 2011

Orbital parameters
- Reference system: Geocentric orbit
- Regime: Sun-synchronous orbit
- Perigee altitude: 602.5 km
- Apogee altitude: 620.4 km
- Inclination: 98.18°
- Period: 96.8 minutes

STUDSAT (STUDent SATellite), is a CubeSat satellite designed by students. This project was conceptualised and project managed by undergraduate students across India. STUDSAT is a picosatellite successfully launched on 12 July 2010 from Satish Dhawan Space Centre into a Sun-synchronous orbit. The mission's objective was for students to have a hands-on experience with the design, fabrication and realisation of a space mission at a minimum cost. Experimental in nature, the mission life was stated to be six months.

STUDSAT was the first picosatellite launched by India, as well as the smallest satellite launched indigenously by any Indian organisation.

== History ==
The project was initiated by a group of four students from different Engineering colleges of Hyderabad and Bangalore who attended International Astronautical Congress (IAC), 2007, Hyderabad, India after meeting Mr. D. V. A. Raghavamurthy (project director, Small Satellites, ISRO Satellite Centre) at the congress. From then the team expanded slowly, ultimately completing the conceptual design. Following the financial budget analysis, the students approached the management of their respective colleges for sponsorship. The colleges, in turn, approached Indian Space Research Organisation (ISRO) for preliminary review of the project. ISRO scientists approved the preliminary design review after having a set of meetings with detailed presentations by the students. The initial four member team expanded to around 45 students from 10 different colleges. Seven of the colleges formed a consortium to provide the financial sponsorship for the project. The colleges are bound by an internal Memorandum of understanding (MOU), led by Nitte Meenakshi Institute of Technology, Bangalore as representative college to sign an official Memorandum of understanding with ISRO. The project team is led by Dr. Jharna Majumdar as the project coordinator.

STUDSAT is successfully placed in the orbit and received the first signal on 12 July 2010 at 11:07 am IST (??:07 UTC).

== Studsat consortium ==
STUDSAT consortium consists of seven Engineering colleges from Hyderabad and Bangalore bound by a Memorandum of understanding in order to sponsor the project financially. The consortium comprises the following colleges:

- Ramaiah Institute of Technology, Bangalore
- R.V. College of Engineering, Bangalore
- B.M.S. Institute of Technology and Management, Bangalore
- Chaitanya Bharathi Institute of Technology, Hyderabad
- Institute of Aeronautical Engineering, Hyderabad
- Vignan Institute of Technology and Science, Hyderabad
- RNS Institute of Technology, Bangalore
- Sri Siddhartha Institute of Technology, Tumkur

== Description ==
The satellite resembles a small rectangular cube, with length dimensions of 10 cm x 10 cm x 13.5 cm, a weight of almost 950 g. The satellite was launched in 625 km Sun-synchronous orbit. The satellite will perform the function of a remote sensing satellite and take images of Earth's surface with a resolution of 90 meter, the best achieved by any "PICO" category satellite in the world.

The satellite consists of the following subsystems:

- Communication sub-system.
- Power generation and distribution sub-system.
- Attitude Determination and Control sub-system.
- On Board Command and Data Handling.
- Payload (camera).
- Mechanical Structure.

A ground station has been designed in order to communicate with the satellite. The ground station NASTRAC (Nitte Amateur Satellite Tracking Centre) which is established in Nitte Meenakshi Institute of Technology (NMIT) was inaugurated by Dr K. Radhakrishnan, the current chairman of ISRO. All the above subsystems are designed by students indigenously.

== Current status ==
The satellite has completed its mission life. The CDR was conducted in NMIT where several scientists notably Prof. Udupi Ramachandra Rao former chairman of ISRO have evaluated the design. The CDR had been approved by ISRO. The satellite was launched by Polar Satellite Launch Vehicle (PSLV-C15) on 12 July 2010. The team had taken over control of the satellite from the ground station established at Nitte Meenakshi Institute of Technology (NMIT) in Bangalore. The satellite is no longer in contact with the ground station.

Two Line Element Set (TLE) of StudSat-1 are:

- 1 36796U 10035B 12227.08525431 .00001146 00000-0 15376-3 0 2565
- 2 36796 098.0573 303.0904 0014305 346.6376 013.4443 14.81257111113029

Source: AFSPC

== STUDSAT-2 ==
The Team STUDSAT is continuing the legacy and building twin nanosatellite for proving the concept of Inter-satellite links (ISL). The design of the Twin-Satellites STUDSAT-2A and STUDSAT-2B, are of dimensions 30 cm x 30 cm x 20 cm and weighing less than 10 kg. The main goal of the STUDSAT 2 project is to develop a low-cost small satellite, capable of operating small scientific or technological payloads where real time connectivity is provided by inter-satellite links.

== Achievements ==
The team has presented a paper titled "Studsat-A Student Pico-Satellite for Imaging" in International Astronautical Congress, 2008 which was held in Glasgow, Scotland. The team won Hans Von Muldau Award for the best team project awarded by International Astronautical Federation (IAF) and sponsored by Deutsche Gesellschaft für Luft- und Raumfahrt. The Team has also done a National Record (India) by entering into LIMCA BOOK of RECORDS-2011 Edition for creating the smallest Indian satellite.

== See also ==
- StudSat-2
- Anusat
- Jugnu
- List of CubeSats
- Pratham Satellite
