= StudSat-2 =

Planned Indian nanosatellite

StudSat-2 (STUDent SATellite-2) is a nanosatellite under development with Studsat-2 Consortium and Visvesvaraya Technological University (VTU) for proving the concept of Inter-satellite link (ISL). The Twin-Satellites STUDSAT-2A and STUDSAT-2B weighing less than 10 kg (22 lb) are of dimensions 30×30×15 cm. The main goal of the StudSat-2 project is to develop a low-cost small satellite, capable of operating small scientific or technological payloads where real time connectivity is provided by inter-satellite links.

Team STUDSAT is coming up with another milestone, Project STUDSAT-2, India's First Twin Nano Satellite Mission to prove Inter Satellite Communication. The student group which was inspired by the Project STUDSAT-1 are the pioneers to this project. Project STUDSAT-2 consisting of two Nano Satellites STUDSAT 2A & 2B has multiple cutting edge technologies. The satellites are in along-the-track constellation architecture with the STUDSAT-2A sending position and velocity data to the STUDSAT-2B through inter-satellite link.

== Objectives ==
=== Primary ===
1. To demonstrate In-Orbit Separation Mechanism for STUDSAT 2A/2B.
2. To design, develop and implement Drag Sail technology in STUDSAT 2B for re-orbiting.
3. To demonstrate Inter Satellite Communication.
4. To demonstrate Solar Panel and Antenna Deployment mechanism in a Nano satellite.
5. To capture images of Earth with a CMOS multispectral camera.

== Secondary ==
1. To create a modular architecture of small satellite which can be used in future missions.
2. To demonstrate satellite development by a team of under graduate students from seven engineering colleges.
3. To promote space technology in educational institutions and encourage research and development in miniaturized satellites.
4. To bridge the gap between academic institutes, research organizations and industries.

== Studsat-2 consortium ==
Studsat-2 consortium consists of seven Engineering colleges across South India bound by an MOU in order to sponsor the project financially. The consortium comprises following colleges.

- Nitte Meenakshi Institute of Technology, Bangalore. [Lead College]
- M S Ramaiah Institute of Technology, Bangalore.
- RNS Institute of Technology, Bangalore.
- N.M.A.M. Institute of Technology, Nitte.
- Nagarjuna College of Engineering & Technology, Bangalore.
- Siddaganga Institute of Technology, Tumkur
- Sri Siddhartha Institute of Technology, Tumkur.

== See also ==
- StudSat
- List of CubeSats
