= Susaek-dong =

- Interactive map of Susaek-dong
- Country: South Korea

Area
  - Total: 1.28 km^{2} (0.49 sq mi)

Population (2001)
  - Total: 17,564
  - Density: 13,722/km^{2} (35,540/sq mi)

Korean name
- Hangul: 수색동
- Hanja: 水色洞
- RR: Susaek-dong
- MR: Susaek-tong

Susaek-dong (Korean: 수색동) is a dong (neighbourhood) of Eunpyeong District, Seoul, South Korea.

== Geography ==
Susaek-dong is situated at the entrance of new cities like Ilsan and Haengsin districts, with Susaek-ro serving as its border. The neighboring regions include Jeungsan-dong to the northeast, while Sangam-dong, Seongsan-dong, and Jungdong lie to the south. Towards the west, one can find Daedeok-dong and Hwajeon-dong in Deogyang District, Goyang, Gyeonggi Province. Currently, the development project known as Susaek Jeungsan New Town is underway in the Susaek-dong area, with an anticipated completion date in July 2023.

== See also ==
- Susaek station
- Administrative divisions of South Korea
