= Aravind Kumar Arali =

Indian politician

Member of the Karnataka Legislative Council
- In office 18 June 2018 – 17 June 2024
- Preceded by: M. R. Seetharam, INC
- Succeeded by: A. Vasanth Kumar, INC

Personal details
- Political party: Indian National Congress

Aravind Kumar Arali was elected unopposed on 4 June 2018 to the Karnataka Legislative Council. Out of 11 seats, the INC won 4 seats, JD(S) 2 and BJP 5.

== Controversy ==
Basavaraj Horatti, Karnataka Legislative Council Chairman took the decision to suspend 15 Congress MLCs, including Aravind Kumar Arali for one day. The suspension was imposed on the grounds of intentionally obstructing the proceedings of the House and disobeying the Chair.
