= Korea Aerospace University =

Private University in South Korea

Coordinates: 37.5994°N 126.8651°E

- 한국항공대학교
- Type: Private
- Established: June 16, 1952
- President: Dr. Kangwoong Lee
- Academic staff: 165
- Administrative staff: 224
- Students: 5,907 (2025)
- Location: Goyang, South Korea
- Campus: Main Campus at Goyang Flight Training Center at Goyang Flight Training Center at Jeju Flight Training Center at Uljin
- Colors: Navy cobalt blue
- Mascot: Peregrine falcon, pine tree, lilac
- Website: www.kau.ac.kr

Korean name
- Hangul: 한국항공대학교
- Hanja: 韓國航空大學校
- RR: Hanguk hanggong daehakgyo
- MR: Han'guk hanggong taehakkyo

Korea Aerospace University (KAU, Korean: 한국항공대학교; Hanja: 韓國航空大學校) is a private university located in Goyang, South Korea, specializing in aviation and aerospace studies. KAU was established on June 16,1952. KAU offers a range of undergraduate, graduate, and doctoral programs, focusing on areas such as aircraft systems, avionics, space engineering, and airport management. The university is known for its strong industry connections, providing students with practical experience through internships, research opportunities, and partnerships with major aerospace companies.

== History ==
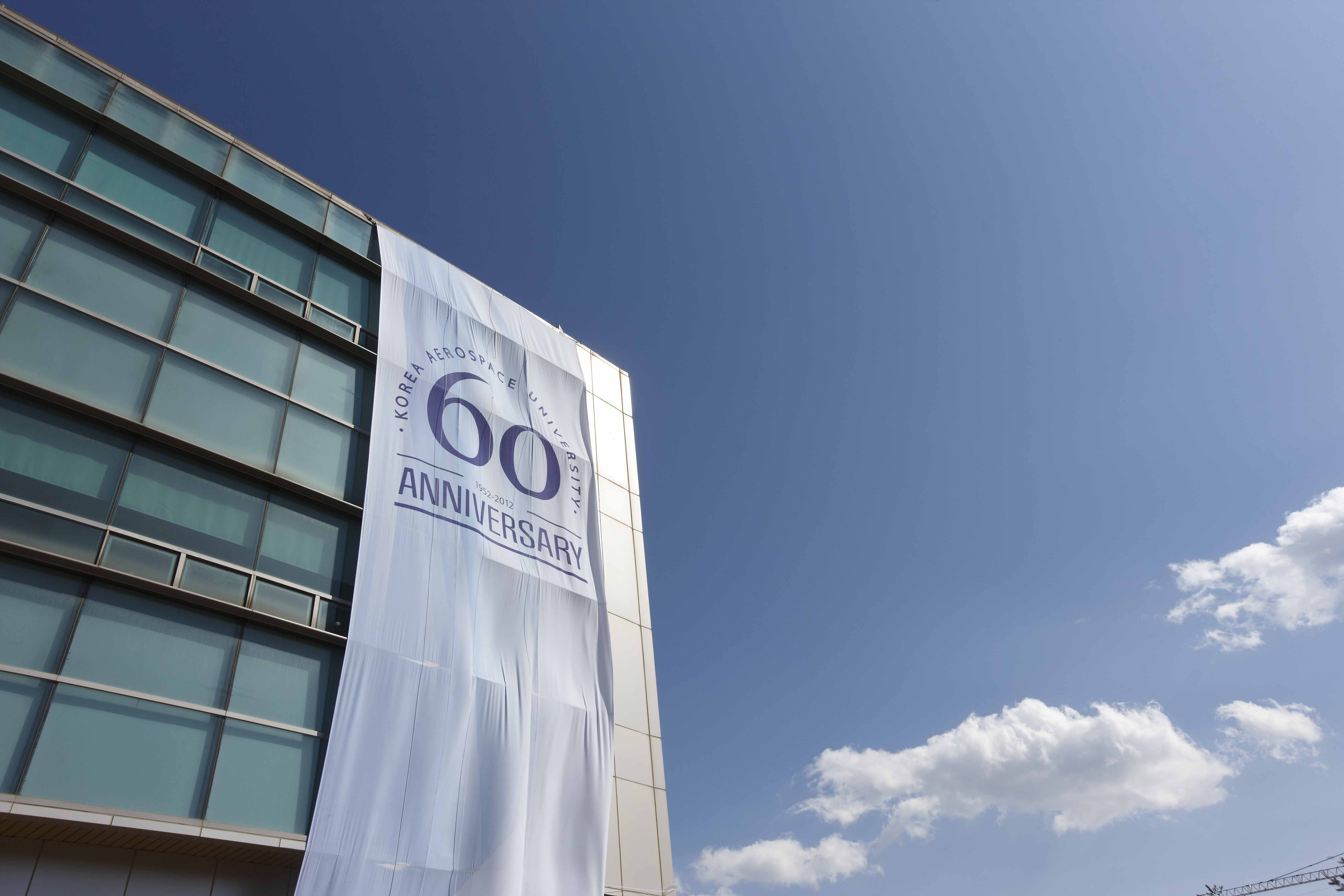
60th anniversary

=== Beginnings (1950s–1960s) ===
Korea Aerospace University was established as a national school on June 16, 1952. During the Korean War, under the Charter for Transport School, which was granted by the Ministry of Transportation (currently the Ministry of Land, Transport and Maritime Affairs) to develop a civil aviation industry. The university primarily started as a two-year course school, solely with three departments: Department of Flight Operation, Department of Aircraft Power, and Department of Telecommunication Engineering.

After the War, the campus moved to Seoul in 1962, then to Goyang City, Gyeonggi-do in 1963, where it stands today. The school buildings were constructed, including the Hangar, the Flight Training Center and the Electronics & Telecommunication Building. Several institutes such as the Central Library, the Maintenance Factory, the Wireless Lab, the Aviation Research Institute, the Training School for Aviation Tech were also opened.

=== Expansion (1970s–1990s) ===
In 1979, the university was taken over by Jungseok Foundation, established by Hanjin Group and it transitioned into a private university.

Through the modifications on quota and name, the establishment of schools, departments and graduate schools were finalized. Auxiliary organizations and institutes were reorganized (see "Centers and institutes").

Furthermore, the Liberal Arts Building, Central Library, the Aviation Control Center, the Mechanical Engineering Building and the Flight Operation Building were opened in the 1970s; the Student's Hall, the Science Building, the Mechanical Engineering Building and the Electronic Engineering Building were constructed in 1990s.

=== Development (2000s-present) ===
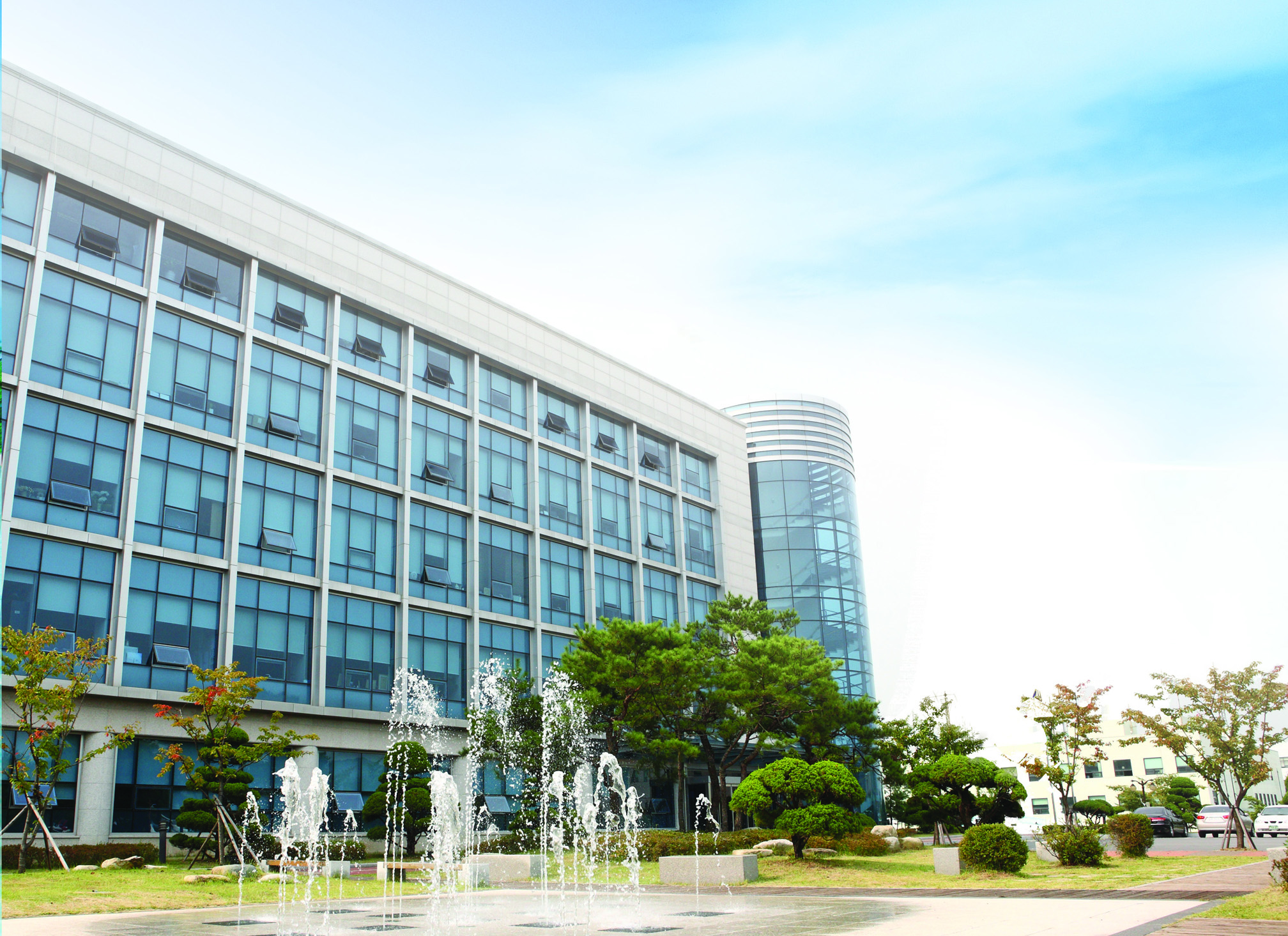
KAU main building

Following a period of consolidation, the university pivoted its efforts toward ensuring internal stability since the early 2000s. Key infrastructures like the Central Library, the Center for Technical Assistance to Small and Medium-sized Industries, the KAU Aerospace Center/Museum, and the New Administrative Building were established. The Library and the Student's Hall were also expanded. In 2006, the university distinguished itself by developing and launching the CubeSat microsatellite, a first among Korean universities.

Pioneering research breakthroughs were realized in the domain of unmanned aerial vehicles (UAV), with the university achieving the first autonomous formation flight of UAV and the first solar-powered UAV flight for 12 continuous hours in Korea.

In 2007, the institution underwent a significant rebranding, changing its name from Hankuk Aviation University to Korea Aerospace University. Concurrently, it began to enhance its capabilities by creating international connections. It received AABI (Aviation Accreditation Board International) certification in various areas including flight education, aviation management, air traffic management, and air transportation systems. It also signed MOUs and cooperation agreements with internationally recognized institutions such as the University of Southern California, Drexel University, Oregon State University, and Embry-Riddle Aeronautical University, and entered into a joint development agreement with General Electric.

Covering a broad spectrum of aerospace fields like Aerospace & Mechanical Engineering, Electronics, Telecommunications, Computer Engineering, Air Transportation and Logistics, Aeronautical Science & Flight Operation, and Air and Space Law, the university has been appointed to spearhead several national initiatives and collaborative research endeavors with global industry leaders like GE, Airbus, PLANSEE since 2009.

=== Research activities ===
- CDSRC (the Defense Specialized University Research Center), 2011–
- Maritime Transport Education Project, 2011–
- GSRC (Global Surveillance Research Center), 2010–
- Logistics Specialized Education Project, 2010–
- Seoul Accord Activation Center, 2010–
- Industrial Technology Development Project, 2010–
- WPM (World Premier Materials Project), 2010–
- The Korea Electric Vehicle and Transportation Safety Convergence System Research Consortium, 2010–
- Haneul Project (for Aerospace Engineers and Global Aviation Experts), 2009–
- Seven NSLs (National Space Laboratory) and three NRLs (National Research Laboratory), 2008–

== Organization ==
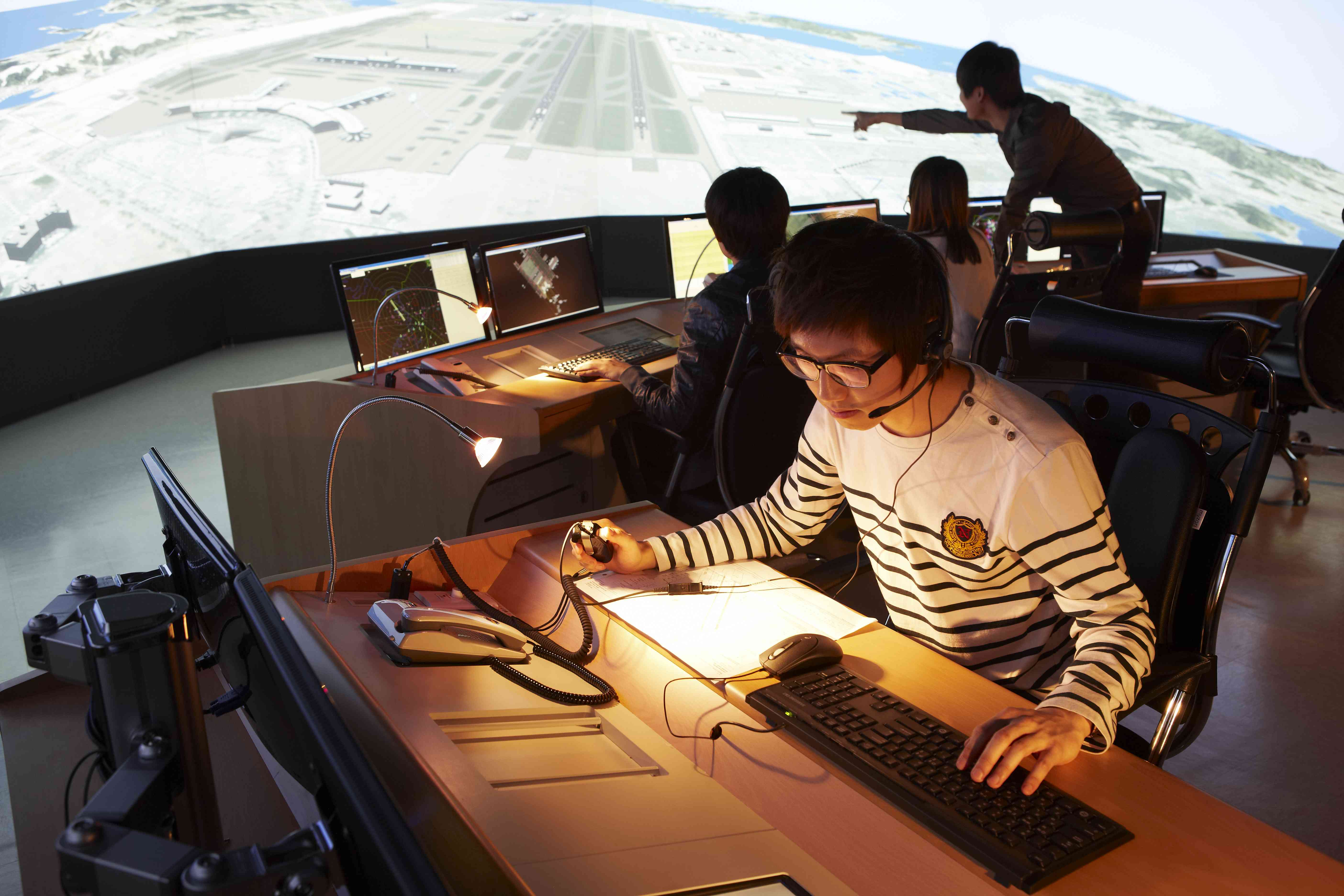
School of Air Transportation and Logistics

=== Undergraduate ===
- College of Engineering
  - School of Aerospace and Mechanical Engineering
    - Mechanical Engineering
    - Aerospace Engineering
    - Aircraft System Engineering
  - School of Electronics, Telecommunication & Computer Engineering
    - Electronic and Avionics Engineering
    - Information and Telecommunication Engineering
    - Software Engineering
  - Department of Materials Engineering
- College of Aviation and Management
  - School of Air Transportation and Logistics
    - Air Transportation
    - Logistics
    - Air and Space Law
  - Department of Aeronautical Science and Flight Operations
  - School of Business
    - Business Administration
    - Global Aviation Management
- School of Liberal Arts and Sciences
  - Department of General Studies
  - Department of English

=== Graduate ===
- Graduate School
  - Master's Course
    - Aerospace & Mechanical Engineering
    - Space Technology
    - Materials Engineering
    - Electronic Engineering
    - Telecommunication & Information Engineering
    - Computer Engineering
    - Aviation Management
    - Air Transport, Transportation and Logistics
    - Business Administration
    - English
    - Air & space Law
  - Doctor's Course
    - Aerospace & Mechanical Engineering
    - Space Technology
    - Materials Engineering
    - Electronic Engineering
    - Telecommunication & Information Engineering
    - Computer Engineering
    - Aviation Management
    - Air Transport, Transportation and Logistics
    - Business Administration
    - English
- Graduate School of Aviation & Management
  - Aviation Industry Group(Master)
    - Techno-Management
    - Air Transport, Transportation and Logistics
    - Air & space Law
    - Aviation Management
  - Business Administration Group(Master)
    - Business Administration
    - Airline Management
    - Tourism Management
  - Advanced Management Program

=== Laboratories ===
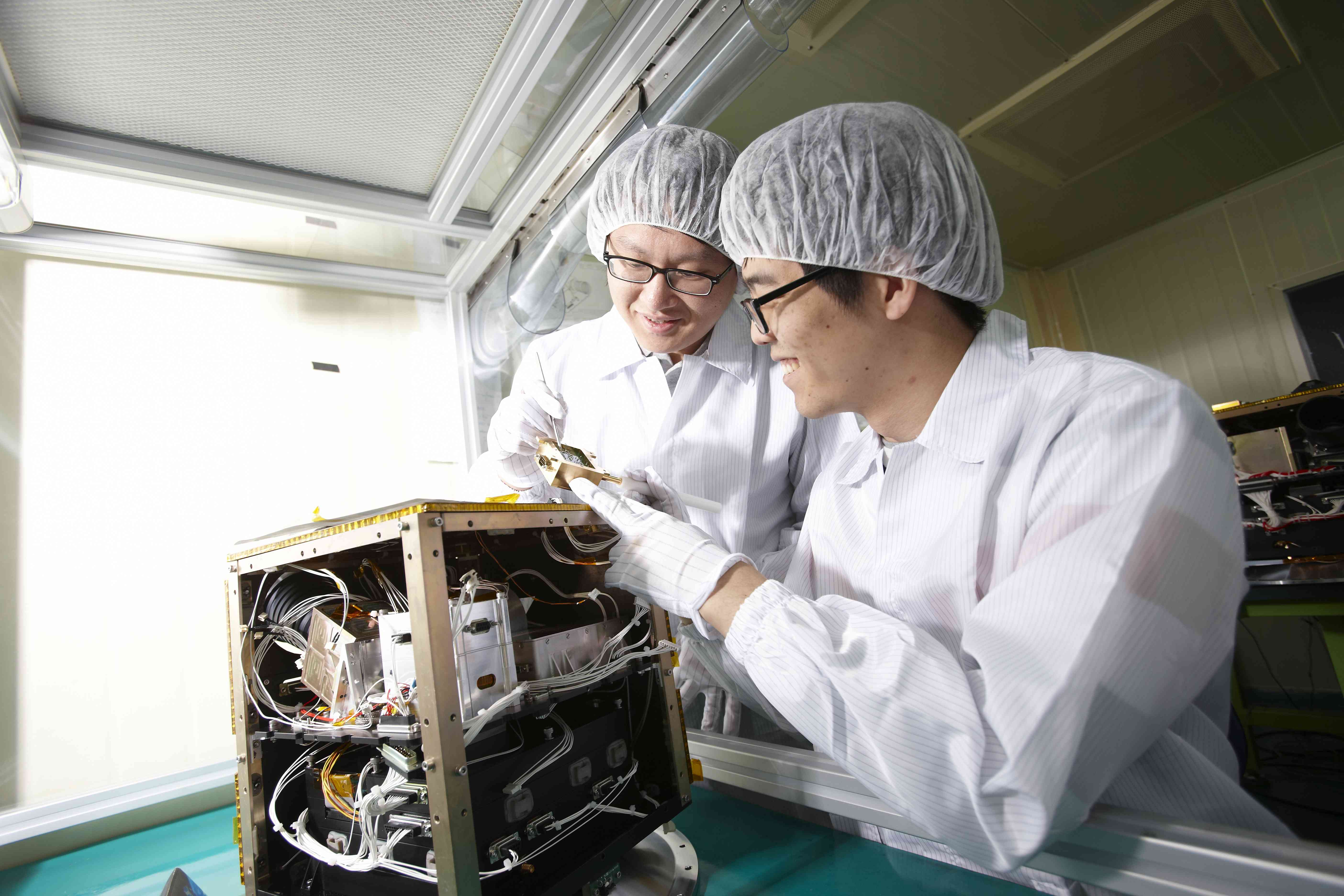
Space System Research Laboratory

- School of Aerospace and Mechanical Engineering
  - Micro & Nano Heat Transfer Laboratory
  - Rocket Propulsion Laboratory
  - Space System Research Laboratory
  - Welding Laboratory
  - Fluid Power Control Laboratory
  - Applied Aerodynamic Laboratory
  - Spacecraft Control Laboratory
  - System Design Optimization Laboratory
- School of Electronics, Telecommunication & Computer Engineering
  - Logic Circuit Laboratory
  - Data Mining Laboratory
  - Radar Signal Processing Laboratory
  - Parallel & Distributed Processing Laboratory
  - Applied Network Research Laboratory
  - Navigation & Information Systems Laboratory
  - Mobile Communication Laboratory
  - NGN Laboratory
  - RF Circuit Laboratory
  - Silicon Graphics Laboratory
- School of Air Transport, Transportation and Logistics
  - Ubiquitous Technology Application Research Center

== Centers and institutes ==
- Global Aviation Training Institute (GATI)
- Institute of International Culture and Education
- KAU Aerospace Museum
- Central Library
- R&D Residence Complex
- Computing Center
- Air Traffic Control Station
- University Newspaper
- University Broadcasting Station
- University Press Office
- Research Institute of Aerospace Engineering and Technology
- Aerospace and Aviation Electronics Research Center
- Institute for Community Research
- Institute for Aircraft Safety and System Management
- Institute for Aviation Industry, Policy and Law
- Student Counseling Center
- Institute for Business Studies
- Institute for Humanities and Natural Science
- Center for Technical Assistance to Small and Medium-sized Industries
- IT Research Center
- Institute of Transportation and Logistics
- Research Center for Internet Information Retrieval
- Advanced Broadcasting Media Technology Research Center
- Ubiquitous Technology Application Research Center (UTAC)
- KAU Research Center for Robotics
- Information Protection Research
- Innovating Engineering Education Center
- Innovating Aviation and Management Education Center
- Center for Teaching and Learning

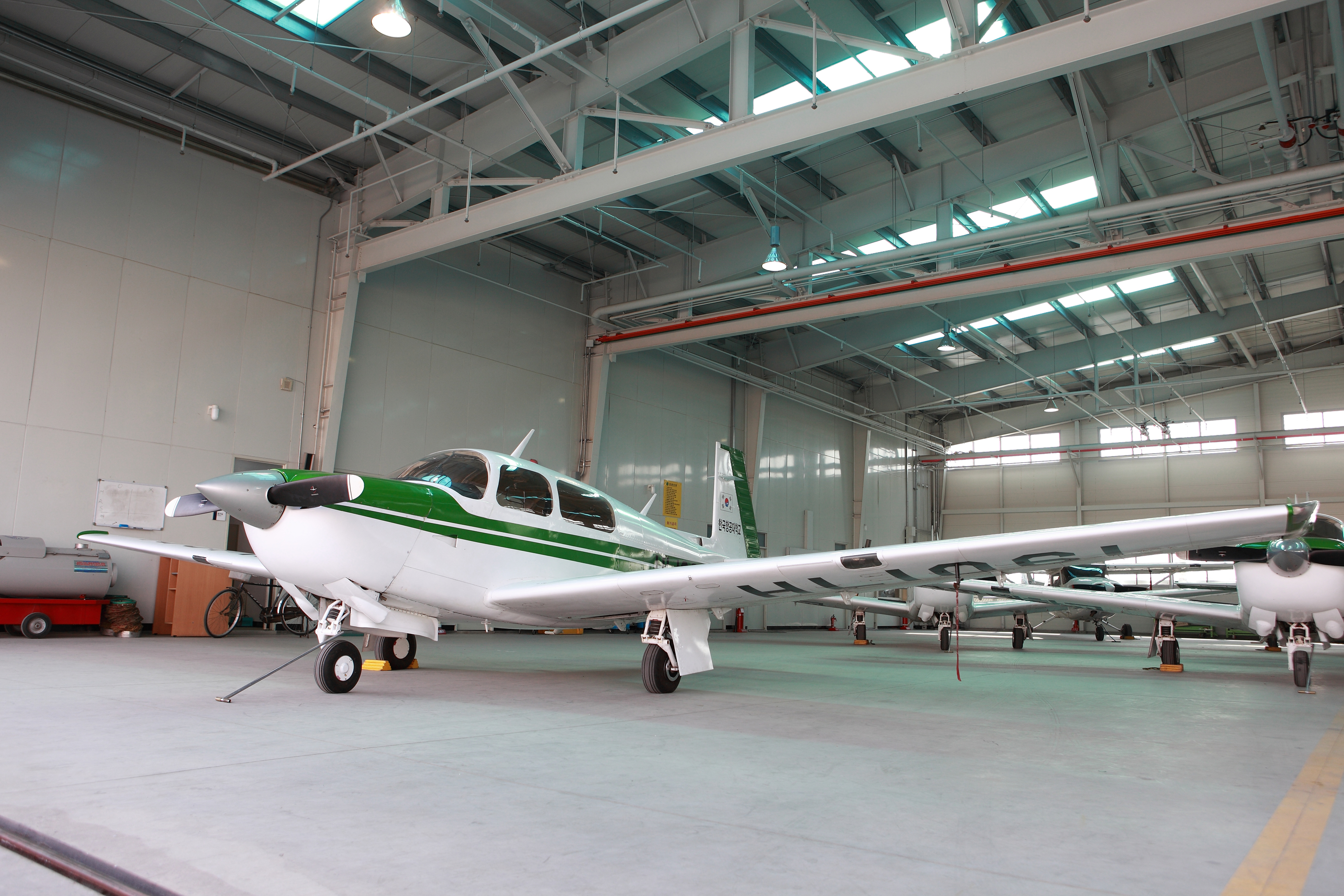
Hangar

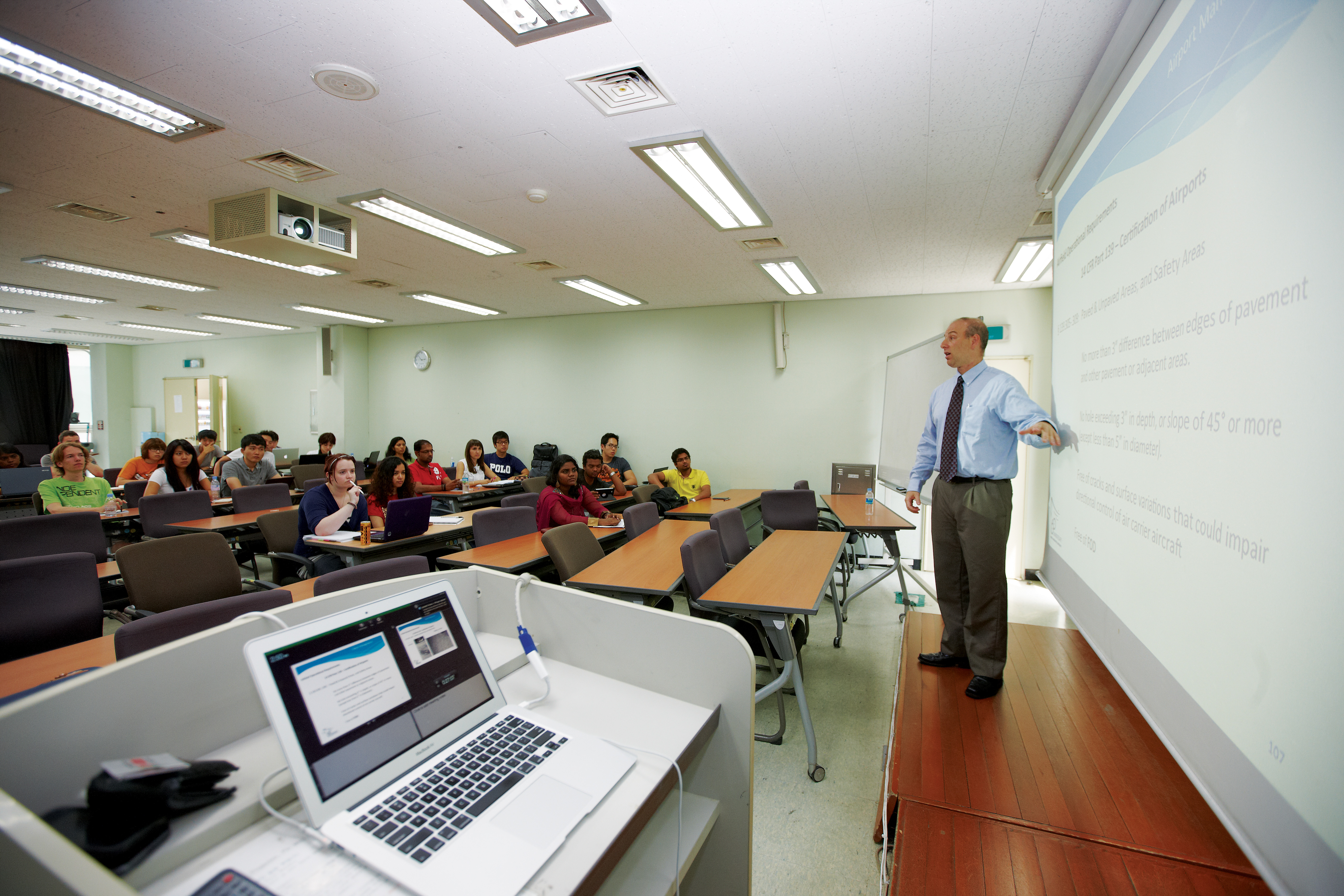
KAU International Summer Program
