= Ramaiah University of Applied Sciences =

University in Karnataka, India

- Motto: Education with Devotion (Bhakthi) is a process of Perfection for larger good
- Type: Private University
- Established: 2013
- Chancellor: M. R. Jayaram
- Vice-Chancellor: Kuldeep Kumar Raina
- Location: Bengaluru, Karnataka, India
- Colors
- Website: www.msruas.ac.in ramaiah.university

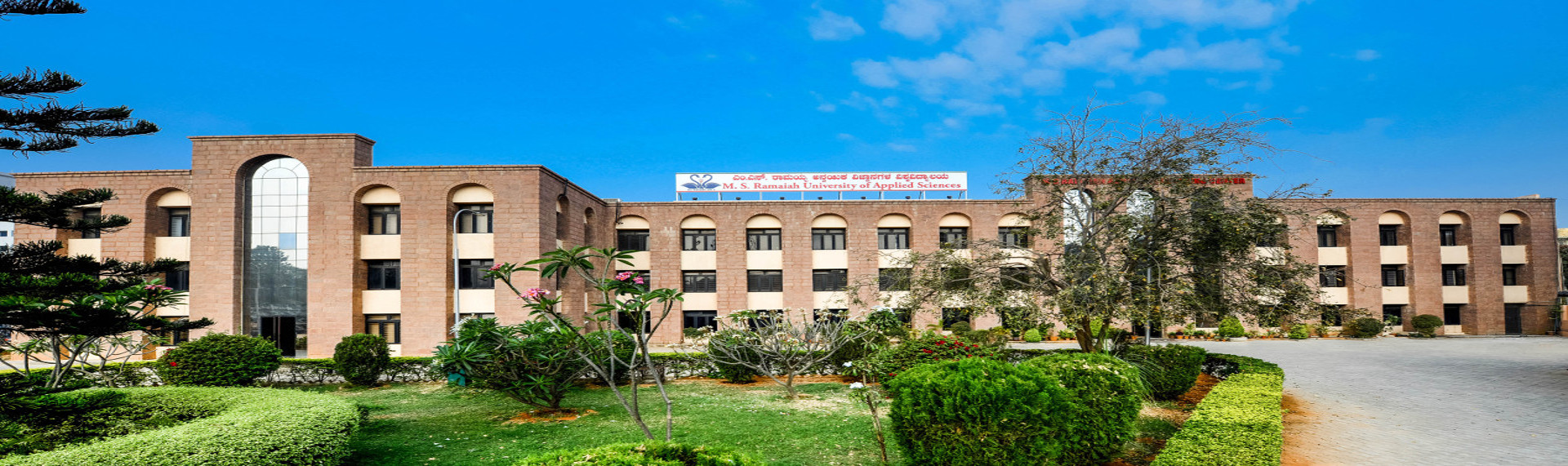
Ramaiah University of Applied Sciences

M. S. Ramaiah University of Applied Sciences (MSRUAS), also known as RUAS, is a private university in Bangalore, India. It was created by an act in the State of Karnataka, India and was established in December 2013.

The university is sponsored by Gokula Education Foundation (Medical) trust. The university was created by integrating M.S. Ramaiah College of Hotel Management (1993), M.S. Ramaiah College of Pharmacy (1992), M.S. Ramaiah Dental College (1991), M. S. Ramaiah School of Advanced Studies (1999) and the M.S. Ramaiah Advanced Learning Centre (2012). The campuses of the university are located at Mathikere and Peenya, Bengaluru, India.

== Organization and administration ==
=== Governance ===
The university is governed by the Hon'ble Chancellor of the university Dr. M. R. Jayaram and Hon'ble Vice-Chancellor of the university is Prof. Kuldeep Kumar Raina. The university houses various faculties leading to award of degrees in undergraduate B.Tech., BCA, B.Des., B.Com., BHM, B.Pharm, Pharm.D., BBA, B.Sc. (Hons), B.A. LL.B.(Hons.), B.Sc.LL.B.(Hons.) in Cyber Security, LL.B. BPT, B.Sc. Nursing, Post B.Sc. Nursing, BDS and B.Voc. Degree. Post graduate MTech, M.Des., MBA., MHA, MPT, M.Sc. Nursing, M.Pharm., MDS., MSc, M.A. in Public Policy, MPH, LL.M.(Alternative Dispute Resolution), LL.M.(Artificial Intelligence & Cyber Security). Doctoral programs (PhD).

=== Faculties and Schools ===
The different faculties under the university are:

- Faculty of Engineering and Technology (FET)
- Faculty of Management and Commerce (FMC)
- Faculty of Hospitality Management and Catering Technology (FHMCT)
- Faculty of Dental Sciences (FDS)
- Faculty of Pharmacy (FP)
- Faculty of Life and Allied Health Sciences (FLAHS)
- Faculty of Art and Design (FAD)
- Faculty of Mathematical & Physical Sciences (FMPS)
- School of Social Sciences
- School of Law
- Ramaiah Medical College
- Ramaiah Institute Of Nursing Education and Research
- Ramaiah College of Physiotherapy

== Academics ==
=== Admissions ===
Admission is specific to the academic program. Examples of accepted admission tests are CET, Uni-GAUGE, COMED-K, and RUAS-AT

=== Academic Programmes ===
The university offers academic programmes through its faculties. The Academic programmes of the university are

- Undergraduate programme leading to B.Tech., BCA, B.Des., B.Com., BHM, B.Pharm, Pharm.D., BBA, B.Sc. (Hons), B.A. LL.B.(Hons.), B.Sc. LL.B.(Hons.) in Cyber Security, LL.B., BPT, B.Sc. Nursing, Post B.Sc. Nursing, BDS and B.Voc. degree with various specialisations.
- Postgraduate Programme leading to MTech, M.Des., MBA., MCA, MHA, MPT, M.Sc. Nursing, M.Pharm., MDS., MSc, M.A. in Public Policy, MPH, LL.M.(Alternative Dispute Resolution), LL.M.(Artificial Intelligence & Cyber Security, MD.
- Doctoral programs leading PhD

=== Rankings ===
The university has been rated as a "Four Star" University under New University Category of Karnataka State University Rating Framework (KSURF). Under the KSURF ranking, RUAS remains as the only University to achieve "Five Stars" for innovation.

The National Institutional Ranking Framework (NIRF) ranked the University 16th among dental colleges in India in 2024 and 68th in Pharmacy category.

University rankings

Pharmacy – India
- NIRF (2024): 68

Dental – India
- NIRF (2024): 16

== Research ==
=== Doctoral Research ===
The Doctoral Research Programme leads to PhD degree of the university. The doctoral programme is offered under following faculties

- Doctor of Philosophy in Dental Sciences
- Doctor of Philosophy in Engineering Technology
- Doctor of Philosophy in Art and Design
- Doctor of Philosophy in Management and Commerce
- Doctor of Philosophy in Physiotherapy
- Doctor of Philosophy in Nursing Sciences
- Doctor of Philosophy in Hospitality Management and Catering Technology
- Doctor of Philosophy in Pharmacy
- Doctor in Philosophy in Life and Allied Health Sciences
- Doctor in Philosophy in Physics, Chemistry and Mathematics
- Doctor of Philosophy in Social Sciences
- Doctor in Philosophy in Law

=== Sponsored Research ===
The university with National and International organisations in government, public and private sector would like to undertake research and generate knowledge for the benefit of the Society. The research themes are:

- Energy & Environment
- Energy Conversion Systems
- Signals & Systems
- Embedded Systems
- Control Systems
- Materials and Manufacturing
- Bio Mechanics & Bio Medical Systems
- Structural Mechanics
- Microelectronics, MEMS and Nano Technology
- Pharmaceutical Chemistry, Drug Development and Drug Delivery
- Dentistry
- Industrial and Business Management

=== Techno Centre ===
The Techno Centre undertakes following activities

- Provide solutions to Engineering and Health Sciences related requirements from Industry
- Design and Develop Products of relevance in Engineering and Health Sciences
- Provide Testing and Validation services to Industry
- Undertake Commercialization of Technology Products
- Incubate Technology Business
- Support Technology Business

=== Transferable Skills and Leadership Development Centre ===
The Ramaiah University of Applied Sciences considers that it is essential and important to train students on transferable skills, managerial skill and leadership skills in addition to providing Education and Practical Skills with global standards in their chosen area of domain to make them successful in their chosen career. The Centre for Transferable Skills and Leadership Development trains students on

- Transferable Skills
- Managerial Skills
- Leadership Skills

In addition to that the centre conducts training to prepare students for Competitive Exams

- Modules for Undergraduate Programs
- Modules for Postgraduate and Research Scholars
- Training for Competitive exams
- Modules for Leadership Development

== See also ==
- M. S. Ramaiah
- List of educational institutions in Bangalore
