= Mahesh Madhavan =

Indian businessman

- Born: 1963 or 1964 (age 62–63); Madras (now Chennai), India
- Education: Ramaiah Institute of Technology (BE); SPJIMR (PGDM)
- Occupation: Businessman
- Title: CEO, Bacardi
- Term: September 2017-
- Predecessor: Mike Dolan

Mahesh Madhavan (born 1963/1964) is an Indian businessman, and the CEO of Bacardi, the largest privately held, family-owned spirits company in the world, since September 2017.

== Early life ==
Madhavan was born in Madras (now Chennai), India.

Madhavan graduated from the Ramaiah Institute of Technology, with a bachelor's degree in mechanical engineering, and later earned a post graduate diploma in management (PGDM) from SPJIMR in 1988.

== Career ==
He began his career in engineering, "building warships for the navy", before earning a PGDM and entering the consumer goods sector, initially at International Distillers & Vintners (IDV).

In 1997, Madhavan left IDV and joined Bacardi.

Madhavan was Bacardi's Asia, Middle East and Africa president before being the head for Europe based in Geneva until he succeeded Mike Dolan as CEO on 30 September 2017.
