= Malleshwaram Assembly constituency =

Constituency of the Karnataka legislative assembly in India

Coordinates: 13.01°N 77.57°E

Malleshwaram
- Constituency No. 157 for the Karnataka Legislative Assembly

Constituency details
- Country: India
- Region: South India
- State: Karnataka
- District: Bangalore Urban
- Lok Sabha constituency: Bangalore North
- Established: 1951
- Total electors: 227,484 (2023)
- Reservation: None

Member of Legislative Assembly
- 16th Karnataka Legislative Assembly
- Incumbent C. N. Ashwath Narayan
- Party: Bharatiya Janata Party
- Elected year: 2023
- Preceded by: M. R. Seetharam

Malleshwaram Assembly constituency is one of the 224 Assembly constituencies of Karnataka. It is a part of Bangalore Urban district and comes under Bangalore North Lok Sabha constituency.

== Members of the Legislative Assembly ==
Election	Member	Party
1952	V. R. Naidu	Indian National Congress
1957	T. Parthasarathy	Independent politician
1962	K. Devaya	Independent politician
1967	M. S. Krishnan	Communist Party of India
1972	M. S. Krishnan	Communist Party of India
1978	P. Ramdev	Janata Party
1983	P. Ramdev	Janata Party
1985	M. Raghupathy	Janata Party
1989	Jeevaraj Alva	Janata Dal
1994	Anant Nag	Janata Dal
1999	M. R. Seetharam	Indian National Congress
2004	M. R. Seetharam	Indian National Congress
2008	Dr. C. N. Ashwath Narayan	Bharatiya Janata Party
2013	Dr. C. N. Ashwath Narayan	Bharatiya Janata Party
2018	Dr. C. N. Ashwath Narayan	Bharatiya Janata Party
2023	Dr. C. N. Ashwath Narayan	Bharatiya Janata Party

== Election results ==
=== Assembly Election 2023 ===
2023 Karnataka Legislative Assembly election : Malleshwaram
Party	Candidate	Votes	%	±%
BJP	Dr. C. N. Ashwath Narayan	80,606	63.72%	▼3.50
INC	Anoop Iyengar	39,304	31.07%	▲7.51
JD(S)	Uthkarsh. A	2,657	2.10%	▼4.28
NOTA	None of the above	2,079	1.64%	▼0.10
AAP	Suman	800	0.63%	New
Margin of victory		41,302	32.65%	▼11.02
Turnout		126,493	55.61%	▼0.88
Total valid votes		126,493		
Registered electors		227,484		▲3.91
BJP hold		Swing	▼3.50	

=== Assembly Election 2018 ===
2018 Karnataka Legislative Assembly election : Malleshwaram
Party	Candidate	Votes	%	±%
BJP	Dr. C. N. Ashwath Narayan	83,130	67.22%	▲17.36
INC	Kengal Shreepadharenu	29,130	23.56%	▼8.07
JD(S)	Madhusudhan. N	7,884	6.38%	▲3.93
NOTA	None of the above	2,157	1.74%	New
Margin of victory		54,000	43.67%	▲25.44
Turnout		123,674	56.49%	▼5.84
Total valid votes		123,665		
Registered electors		218,931		▲26.00
BJP hold		Swing	▲17.36	

=== Assembly Election 2013 ===
2013 Karnataka Legislative Assembly election : Malleshwaram
Party	Candidate	Votes	%	±%
BJP	Dr. C. N. Ashwath Narayan	57,609	49.86%	▼2.27
INC	B. K. Shivaram	36,543	31.63%	▼12.57
LSP	Dr. Meenakshi Bharath	7,610	6.59%	New
JD(S)	Shwetha. S	2,827	2.45%	▲0.23
KJP	Kumar. N	1,910	1.65%	New
Margin of victory		21,066	18.23%	▲10.30
Turnout		108,304	62.33%	▲10.10
Total valid votes		115,540		
Registered electors		173,761		▼12.08
BJP hold		Swing	▼2.27	

=== Assembly Election 2008 ===
2008 Karnataka Legislative Assembly election : Malleshwaram
Party	Candidate	Votes	%	±%
BJP	Dr. C. N. Ashwath Narayan	53,794	52.13%	▲10.62
INC	M. R. Seetharam	45,611	44.20%	▼8.20
JD(S)	M. Shankaranna	2,291	2.22%	▼2.19
Margin of victory		8,183	7.93%	▼2.96
Turnout		103,218	52.23%	▲6.06
Total valid votes		103,200		
Registered electors		197,639		▲1.17
BJP gain from INC		Swing	▼0.27	

=== Assembly Election 2004 ===
2004 Karnataka Legislative Assembly election : Malleshwaram
Party	Candidate	Votes	%	±%
INC	M. R. Seetharam	47,029	52.40%	▲4.74
BJP	Dr. C. N. Ashwath Narayan	37,252	41.51%	New
JD(S)	Bhadragiri Sarvothama Pai	3,959	4.41%	▼14.51
Kannada Nadu Party	Dr. Bhagavandas Alva. K	666	0.74%	New
Margin of victory		9,777	10.89%	▼10.67
Turnout		90,197	46.17%	▼1.34
Total valid votes		89,745		
Registered electors		195,353		▲10.96
INC hold		Swing	▲4.74	

=== Assembly Election 1999 ===
1999 Karnataka Legislative Assembly election : Malleshwaram
Party	Candidate	Votes	%	±%
INC	M. R. Seetharam	39,864	47.66%	▲31.24
JD(U)	M. Raghupathy	21,829	26.10%	New
JD(S)	Nanjundappa. B. R	15,823	18.92%	New
Independent	Puttaswamy. B. J	1,974	2.36%	New
Independent	K. V. Achar	1,492	1.78%	New
Independent	Venkatesharao. B. J. P	716	0.86%	New
Independent	Dr. Jayalakshmi. H. G	652	0.78%	New
Independent	Dr. Shamanna. K	546	0.65%	New
NCP	Visweshweshwara Sharma Iyyer. S	531	0.63%	New
Margin of victory		18,035	21.56%	▼6.07
Turnout		83,646	47.51%	▼12.84
Total valid votes		83,646		
Registered electors		176,054		▲17.69
INC gain from JD		Swing	▼1.44	

=== Assembly Election 1994 ===
1994 Karnataka Legislative Assembly election : Malleshwaram
Party	Candidate	Votes	%	±%
JD	Anant Nag	43,772	49.10%	▲6.58
BJP	H. N. Chandrashekara	19,142	21.47%	▲14.91
INC	H. D. Gangaraj	14,635	16.42%	New
INC	V. G. Parashurama	8,315	9.33%	New
JP	Kodagina Seethamma	1,057	1.19%	New
Independent	H. G. Jayalakshmi	876	0.98%	New
Margin of victory		24,630	27.63%	▲23.17
Turnout		90,270	60.35%	▲4.33
Total valid votes		89,143		
Rejected ballots		1,127	1.25%	▼3.51
Registered electors		149,588		▼2.90
JD hold		Swing	▲6.58	

=== Assembly Election 1989 ===
1989 Karnataka Legislative Assembly election : Malleshwaram
Party	Candidate	Votes	%	±%
JD	Jeevaraj Alva	34,955	42.52%	New
Independent	P. Ramdev	31,285	38.06%	New
JP	R. Venugopala Reddy	8,682	10.56%	New
BJP	Sarojini Muthanna	5,389	6.56%	New
SUCI(C)	K. Uma	526	0.64%	New
Margin of victory		3,670	4.46%	▼27.31
Turnout		86,310	56.02%	▼1.41
Total valid votes		82,204		
Rejected ballots		4,106	4.76%	▲3.70
Registered electors		154,060		▲28.17
JD gain from JP		Swing	▼13.77	

=== Assembly Election 1985 ===
1985 Karnataka Legislative Assembly election : Malleshwaram
Party	Candidate	Votes	%	±%
JP	M. Raghupathy	38,445	56.29%	▼9.73
INC	Vijoilakshami Ram Bhat	16,746	24.52%	▲2.32
Independent	T. Venkatesh	11,092	16.24%	New
LKD	Sunder Babu Shetty	1,012	1.48%	New
Margin of victory		21,699	31.77%	▼12.06
Turnout		69,027	57.43%	▼3.62
Total valid votes		68,294		
Rejected ballots		733	1.06%	▼1.29
Registered electors		120,202		▲9.81
JP hold		Swing	▼9.73	

=== Assembly Election 1983 ===
1983 Karnataka Legislative Assembly election : Malleshwaram
Party	Candidate	Votes	%	±%
JP	P. Ramdev	43,083	66.02%	▲9.07
INC	K. V. Achar	14,483	22.20%	▲19.52
BJP	N. A. Chidambara	6,042	9.26%	New
Independent	Radhakrishna	400	0.61%	New
Margin of victory		28,600	43.83%	▲23.05
Turnout		66,822	61.05%	▼5.34
Total valid votes		65,253		
Rejected ballots		1,569	2.35%	▲0.20
Registered electors		109,460		▲22.96
JP hold		Swing	▲9.07	

=== Assembly Election 1978 ===
1978 Karnataka Legislative Assembly election : Malleshwaram
Party	Candidate	Votes	%	±%
JP	P. Ramdev	32,936	56.95%	New
CPI	M. S. Krishnan	20,918	36.17%	▼17.39
Independent	J. Lingaiah	2,066	3.57%	New
INC	Lakshminarasimhaiah	1,550	2.68%	New
Margin of victory		12,018	20.78%	▼10.12
Turnout		59,102	66.39%	▲15.66
Total valid votes		57,829		
Rejected ballots		1,273	2.15%	▲2.15
Registered electors		89,018		▼26.22
JP gain from CPI		Swing	▲3.39	

=== Assembly Election 1972 ===
1972 Mysore State Legislative Assembly election : Malleshwaram
Party	Candidate	Votes	%	±%
CPI	M. S. Krishnan	31,925	53.56%	New
Independent	P. Ramdev	13,506	22.66%	New
ABJS	B. M. Rama Krishnappa	7,256	12.17%	▲5.39
Independent	K. B. Venkatesh	5,682	9.53%	New
Independent	Kesari Gopinath	461	0.77%	New
Independent	H. S. Sheshibhushan	410	0.69%	New
Independent	Ramdas	369	0.62%	New
Margin of victory		18,419	30.90%	▲27.79
Turnout		61,208	50.73%	▼0.92
Total valid votes		59,609		
Registered electors		120,653		▲39.48
CPI gain from CPI(M)		Swing	▲23.30	

=== Assembly Election 1967 ===
1967 Mysore State Legislative Assembly election : Malleshwaram
Party	Candidate	Votes	%	±%
CPI(M)	M. S. Krishnan	12,977	30.26%	New
INC	T. K. T. Gowda	11,641	27.14%	▲5.47
Independent	P. Ramdev	9,774	22.79%	New
Independent	H. V. Rangappa	3,856	8.99%	New
ABJS	M. R. Jois	2,907	6.78%	New
Independent	S. P. Naidu	963	2.25%	New
Independent	B. L. Nagaraj	773	1.80%	New
Margin of victory		1,336	3.11%	▲2.38
Turnout		44,675	51.65%	▼3.58
Total valid votes		42,891		
Registered electors		86,499		▲25.80
CPI(M) gain from Independent		Swing	▲7.85	

=== Assembly Election 1962 ===
1962 Mysore State Legislative Assembly election : Malleshwaram
Party	Candidate	Votes	%	±%
Independent	K. Devaya	8,097	22.41%	New
INC	K. Sriramulu	7,832	21.67%	▼14.29
SWA	B. Venkatasubba Rao	5,438	15.05%	New
Independent	T. Parthasarathy	5,250	14.53%	New
CPI	A. Nagesha Rao	4,524	12.52%	▲0.33
DMK	Anniappan	2,648	7.33%	New
ABJS	S. B. Swethadri	985	2.73%	New
RPI	Jayaram	792	2.19%	New
Independent	B. Dasaratha Rao	571	1.58%	New
Margin of victory		265	0.73%	▼6.11
Turnout		37,978	55.23%	▲12.17
Total valid votes		36,137		
Registered electors		68,758		▲20.08
Independent hold		Swing	▼20.39	

=== Assembly Election 1957 ===
1957 Mysore State Legislative Assembly election : Malleshwaram
Party	Candidate	Votes	%	±%
Independent	T. Parthasarathy	10,552	42.80%	New
INC	Kumaran. K. S	8,866	35.96%	▼4.69
CPI	A. Nagesha Rao	3,006	12.19%	New
SCF	Balasundaram	1,320	5.35%	New
Independent	Nanjappa	910	3.69%	New
Margin of victory		1,686	6.84%	▼5.59
Turnout		24,654	43.06%	▼7.37
Total valid votes		24,654		
Registered electors		57,258		▲24.34
Independent gain from INC		Swing	▲2.15	

=== Assembly Election 1952 ===
1952 Mysore State Legislative Assembly election : Malleshwaram
Party	Candidate	Votes	%	±%
INC	V. R. Naidu	9,441	40.65%	New
Socialist Party (India)	T. Parthasarathy	6,554	28.22%	New
Independent	K. S. Naidu	5,506	23.71%	New
ABJS	M. Krishnaswamy Pillai	934	4.02%	New
Independent	H. V. Chandrasekharaiah	443	1.91%	New
Independent	S. K. Venkataranga Iyengar	346	1.49%	New
Margin of victory		2,887	12.43%	
Turnout		23,224	50.43%	
Total valid votes		23,224		
Registered electors		46,049		
INC win (new seat)				
