= Ramaiah Institute of Technology =

Engineering college in Bangalore, India

- Former name: M.S. Ramaiah Institute of Technology
- Motto: Service to Humanity is Service to God
- Type: private
- Established: 1962; 64 years ago
- Affiliations: Visvesvaraya Technological University
- Chairman: M. R. Jayaram
- Principal: Dr. B. Satish Babu
- Director: M. R. Seetharam
- Location: Bangalore, Karnataka, 560 054, India; 13°1′47.9″N 77°33′53.9″E
- Website: msrit.edu

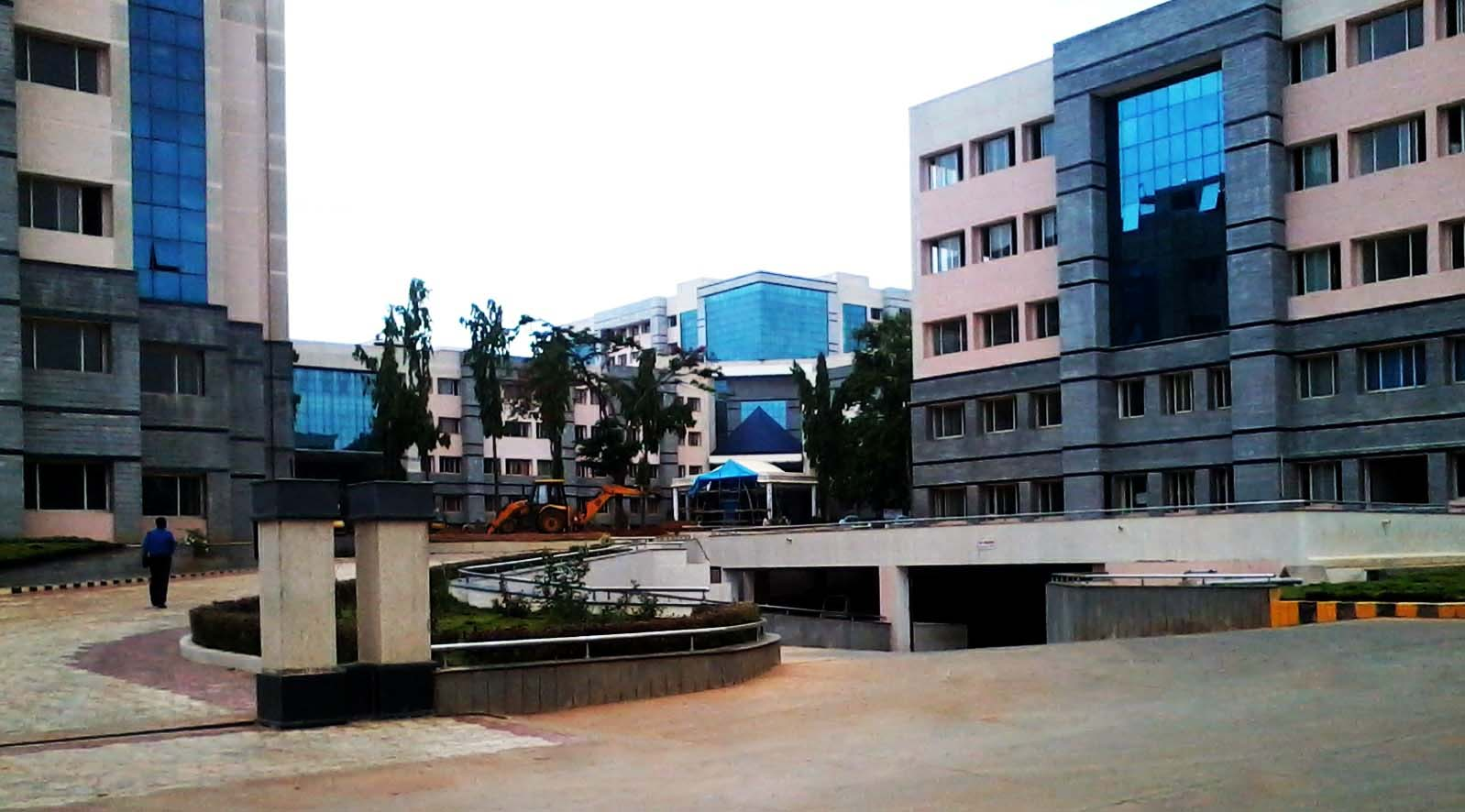
Ramaiah Institute of Technology

Ramaiah Institute of Technology (RIT), formerly known as M.S. Ramaiah Institute of Technology (MSRIT), is a private engineering college located in Bengaluru in the Indian state of Karnataka. Established in 1962, the college is affiliated to Visvesvaraya Technological University.

== History ==
RIT was founded, in 1962, by the late M. S. Ramaiah, who was an educationist, philanthropist, and civil contractor. RIT is a part of Gokula Education Foundation (GEF) which owns and manages several educational institutions across various streams. The foundation also runs a Multi Speciality Hospital. RIT was the first institute started by the Gokula Education Foundation.

== Student life ==
Ramaiah Institute of Technology has hostel facilities for both boys and girls. It also has a gym and libraries. There are various auditoriums and seminar halls in each block. Internet facility is also available for the students.

== Administration ==
M. R. Seetharam, a son of M. S. Ramaiah, currently heads the college management as a director. The autonomy given to the institute by the government is only for academic matters. The governing council of the college includes two principals of other colleges, one bureaucrat from state government of Karnataka, one bureaucrat from central government of India, and one member from the VTU.

=== Departments ===
Ramaiah Institute of Technology has a total of 24 departments :

- Aerospace Engineering
- Architecture
- Artificial Intelligence and Data Science
- Artificial Intelligence and Machine Learning
- Biotechnology
- Chemical Engineering
- Chemistry
- Civil Engineering
- Computer Science and Engineering
- Computer Science and Engineering (AI and ML)
- Computer Science and Engineering (Cybersecurity)
- Electronics and Communication Engineering
- Electronics and Instrumentation Engineering
- Electrical and Electronics Engineering
- Electronics and Telecommunication Engineering
- Humanities
- Industrial Engineering and Management
- Information Science and Engineering
- Mathematics
- Master of Computer Applications
- Management Studies (MBA)
- Mechanical Engineering
- Medical Electronics
- Physics

== Affiliations and approvals ==
Initially, RIT was affiliated to Mysore University, later with the Bangalore University (until 2002) and now Visvesvaraya Technological University, Belgaum. It is an institutional member of the ISTE and is recognised by the All India Council for Technical Education (AICTE) which is a must for any technical institute in India. It has been certified ISO 9001:2008 and has been accredited for quality education by the Central government of India Body National Board of Accreditation. The Architecture Department is approved by the Council of Architecture (Government of India).

== Academics ==
Since August 2007, RIT has been academically autonomous for both undergraduate and postgraduate programs. While VTU still awards the degrees, the college has academic freedom in framing its own schemes of study, curricula and student evaluation. RIT offers undergraduate and graduate courses of study and research including Bachelor of Engineering, Bachelor of Architecture, Master of Technology, Master of Business Administration and offers programs leading to award of PhD in various disciplines. RIT is also a research centre in 12 areas including engineering and management disciplines.

== Activities ==
- It partnered with ISRO in 2010 to build the StudSat nano satellite and RIT was chosen in 2012 to join the consortium of colleges that would assist ISRO in the StudSat-2 project. The institute is also credited for the development of India's first unmanned air vehicle (UAV) with an autopilot system.
- IEEE: The college has an IEEE Student branch. The IEEE-MSRIT celebrates its tech fest Aavishkaar each year Various competitions such as Algomach (On Spot Programming), Design and Debugging (Circuit debugging), Robotics, Cyber Treasure Hunt (CTH), Paper Presentation, Gaming, Tech Quiz, Product Design, 8086/8051 Programming, Amazing Race, Photoshop Contest are held along with Workshops.
- TEDxMSRIT: This student organisation conducted a national event in March 2012. The event involved speakers such as Atul Chitnis, Devi Prasad Shetty, Soumitra Bhattacharya Praveen Godkhindi and others.
- Velocita Racing: The combustion class Formula Student team came 10th overall in Formula Bharat 2024, with being finalist in Engineering Design.
- Stier Racing - Electric Racing Team
- Stardust - The college also has a student's club which deals with rocketry and satellite.
- Team Volante - Team Volante is an electric motorsports team which builds electric All terrain vehicle (e-ATV) and participates in SAE e-Baja held in pitampur every year. The team also stood 3rd overall in Mega ATV championship 2022 held in goa.

== Industry recognition ==
- Karnataka's first IBM Centre of Excellence was established on 19 March 2009 at RIT. This center has been in involved in training students with software like DB2, Tivoli, etc.
- Schneider Electric: RIT has signed a memorandum of understanding With global energy management company Schneider Electric to promote technical excellence in the field of electronics, software and control engineering. The MoU covers "university partnership for curriculum development" and through this arrangement RIT has developed two courses – advanced industrial automation and modern controls, and energy management
- JSW Energy Centre of Excellence (JSWECE). RIT entered into a MoU with US$8 Billion company JSW Energy for offering a one-year full-time Post Graduate Diploma in Power Plant Engineering for engineering graduates
- Intel Center of Excellence: International microprocessor giant Intel entered into an agreement with RIT to open a Centre of excellence in January 2010. The event was attended by Scott apeland who is the Director of Developer Networks at Intel, USA. The program aims at faculty development and inclusion of Intel processor in curricula of RIT. This center is only one of its kind in Karnataka.
- Cognizant Technology Solutions is entering into an agreement with RIT in a collaboration to create industry specific courses for students.
- Autodesk has recognised M.S. Ramaiah Institute of Technology as one of the Zonal Centre for the YEARLY CAD DESIGN CONTEST.
- Autodesk has awarded Sunith Babu L from Department of Mechanical Engineering, M.S. Ramaiah Institute of Technology as India's First Autodesk Certified Instructor.
- Autodesk has recognised Sunith Babu L from Department of Mechanical Engineering, M.S. Ramaiah Institute of Technology as an Academic Council Member for "All India 3D Student Design Competition".

== Rankings ==
University rankings

Engineering – India
- NIRF (2021): 65
- NIRF (2022): 67
- NIRF (2023): 78
- NIRF (2024): 75
- India Today (2020): 27
- Private colleges
- Outlook India (2021): 13

Architecture – India
- NIRF (2024): 21

Among engineering colleges in India, RIT ranked 27th by India Today in 2020, 13th among private engineering colleges by Outlook India in 2021 and 75th among engineering colleges by the National Institutional Ranking Framework (NIRF) in 2024.

== Notable alumni ==
- Kanan Gill, stand-up comedian
- Komal Jha, actress
- Sajjan Jindal, chairman of JSW Group
- Saad Khan, film director
- Mahesh Madhavan, CEO of Bacardi
- Pushkara Mallikarjunaiah, film producer
- Rashmika Mandanna, actress
- Adithya Srinivasan, singer
- Mohammed Zubair, Indian journalist and Co-founder of Alt News
- Adithya Menon, Indian actor
- Yuva Rajkumar, Indian actor
