= Graduate University of Advanced Technology =

Coordinates: 30.052008°N 57.245979°E

Graduate University of Advanced technology (GUAT)
- دانشگاه تحصیلات تکمیلی صنعتی و فناوری پیشرفته
- Type: Public
- President: Hossein Mohebi
- Faculty: 120
- Administrative staff: 300
- Students: ~ 1,000
- Location: Kerman, Kerman province, Iran
- Campus: Mahan

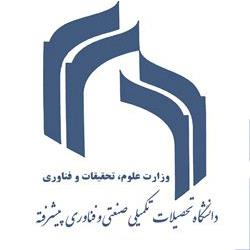
arm kgut

The Graduate University of Advanced Technology (GUAT) is an advanced research center and graduate-level degree-granting institution in Kerman, Iran. It was founded in 2007. It is also known as Kerman Graduate University of Technology (KGUT). The main campus is located in Mahan, Kerman.

GUAT offers advanced degrees (master's and Ph.D.) in Electrical, Civil, Mechanical, Chemical, Material, Mineral and Photonic Engineering.

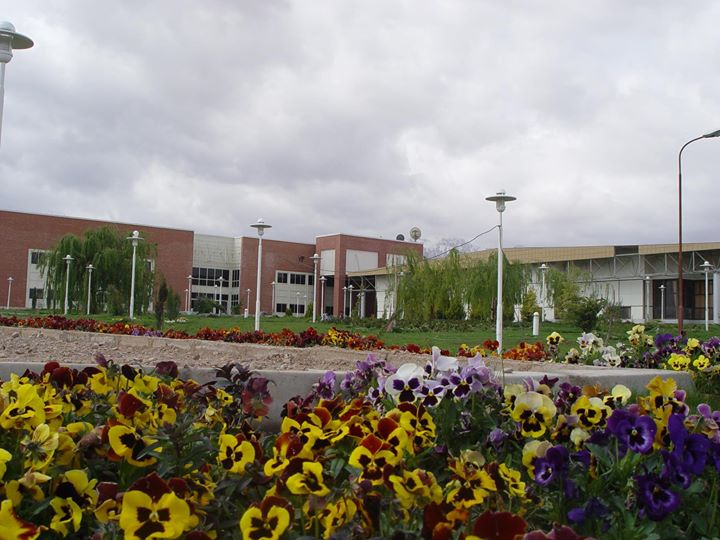
Kerman Graduate University of Technology

== Faculties and Colleges ==
Colleges bring together academics and students from a broad range of disciplines, and within each faculty or department within the university, academics from many different colleges can be found.

- Faculty of Electrical and Computer Engineering
  - Department of Telecommunications and Electronics Engineering
  - Department of Power and Control Engineering
  - Department of Computer Engineering and Information Technology
- Faculty of Mechanical and Materials Engineering
  - Department of Energy Conversion Engineering
  - Department of Design and Manufacturing Engineering
  - Department of Material Engineering
- Faculty of Chemistry and Chemical Engineering
  - Department of Chemistry
  - Department of Chemical Engineering
  - Department of Polymer Engineering
- Faculty of Civil Engineering and Geodesy
  - Department of Surveying Engineering
  - Department of Earthquake and Geotechnical Engineering
  - Department of Water Engineering
- Faculty of Sciences & Modern Technologies
  - Department of Photonics
  - Department of Earth Science
  - Department of Nanotechnology
  - Department of Applied Mathematics
  - Department of Biomedical Engineering
  - Department of Nuclear Engineering

The university also consists of several Research Institutes.

- Environmental Sciences Research Center
  - Environmental Sciences Research Center (ESRC) was established as a "fundamental research" division of the ICST in 2001. ESRC has four research departments including Biotechnology, Ecology, Biodiversity and Environment. The aim here is to conduct research in different fields of environmental science with the objective of reducing the adverse effects of technological developments on environment; and development of methods that help to utilize natural resources more appropriately for a sustained development. Detailed aims and objectives are included in department's homepage. The Environmental Sciences Research Institute has well equipped laboratories and welcomes collaborative efforts with other research centers and universities. The Fourth National Biotechnology Congress in 2005, the Second National Cell and Molecular Biology in 2008 and the First National Meeting on Herpetology in 2009 were held by the Environmental Sciences Research Institute. In addition, several workshops on stem cell culture, PCR, real-time PCR and research methods in biological sciences have also been held by ESRC.
- Photonics Research Center
  - The Photonics Research Center (PRC) comprises four research groups, namely laser, optical fiber, semiconductors, and nano-photonics. With a set of pre-determined goals, PRC started its activities in 2001. At present, PRC is engaged in education and research activities with its full-time, visiting, and part-time faculty members.
- Materials Research Center
  - The Materials Research Center (MRC) received its license and authority from Ministry of Science, Research and Technology in 2002. MRC was established in the form of three research groups of metals, ceramics, and new materials; with the goal of providing infrastructure for research projects and training of materials specialists. MRC is committed to scientific dissemination and communication with other research centers, according to Center's by-laws.
- Energy Research Center
  - Energy provision is man's oldest problem and presently it is reaching a crisis a point. There are numerous challenges in this regard, and most industrialized countries have engaged the issue with all their economical and technological mights. In order to create the appropriate infrastructure that is needed to conduct research projects and train specialists, the Energy Research Center (ERC) has divided its activities into three areas of 1-Energy Optimization and Management, 2-Renewable Energy, and 3-Fuel Cell, Hydrogen, and Energy transform, since 2004. ERC received an agreement in principle for its activities from Iran's Ministry of Science, Research and Technology in August 2005.
- Information Technology Research Center
  - Activities of this group are towards reaching Center's goals on development of the science and technology in field of Information Technology (IT). These activities are divided into two areas of research and higher education while giving priority to research along the following axioms: Carrying out fundamental, applied, and developing research efforts related to IT, and obtaining advanced technologies in this field. Offering educational workshops, scientific seminars, and research courses. Instrumentation and maintenance of research laboratories in regards to IT; and consultation services to research centers, universities and industrial centers.
