= Transnational Law and Business University =

Business University

Coordinates: 37.7266°N 126.8684°E

Transnational Law and Business University (TLBU) is a post-graduate university located in Goyang-si, Gyeonggi-do, South Korea, located 20 km (12 mi) from Seoul with a branch in Orry-la-Ville near Paris and a branch in construction in Maryland, United States.

== Goals ==
1. Development of a Regional Community for Permanent Peace & Prosperity in East Asia
2. Asian-European Cooperation and Global Cooperation
3. Strengthening Asian-American Cooperation
4. Formation of High-Qualified transnational legal experts.

== Scholarship ==
All students at TLBU are eligible to apply for scholarships. The scholarship includes tuition fees, board and lodging and airfares for field studies in Beijing and Paris. However, students must be able to afford airfare to visit his/her home during recess and transportation to TLBU for initial arrival. From the academic year 2015, the accepted students have to pay $11,000 USD for the shared accommodation.

== Admissions ==
For the TLBU Master of Laws Program in Korea, candidates from non-English-speaking countries are required to take the Test of English as Foreign Language (TOEFL) or International English Language Testing System (IELTS) or CET. The exams are required for all students whose undergraduate work was not in English. additional French is preferred.

== President ==
As of 2018, the president is Lyou Byung-Hwa.
