= Joint Special Operations University =

Coordinates: 27.8541°N 82.4859°W

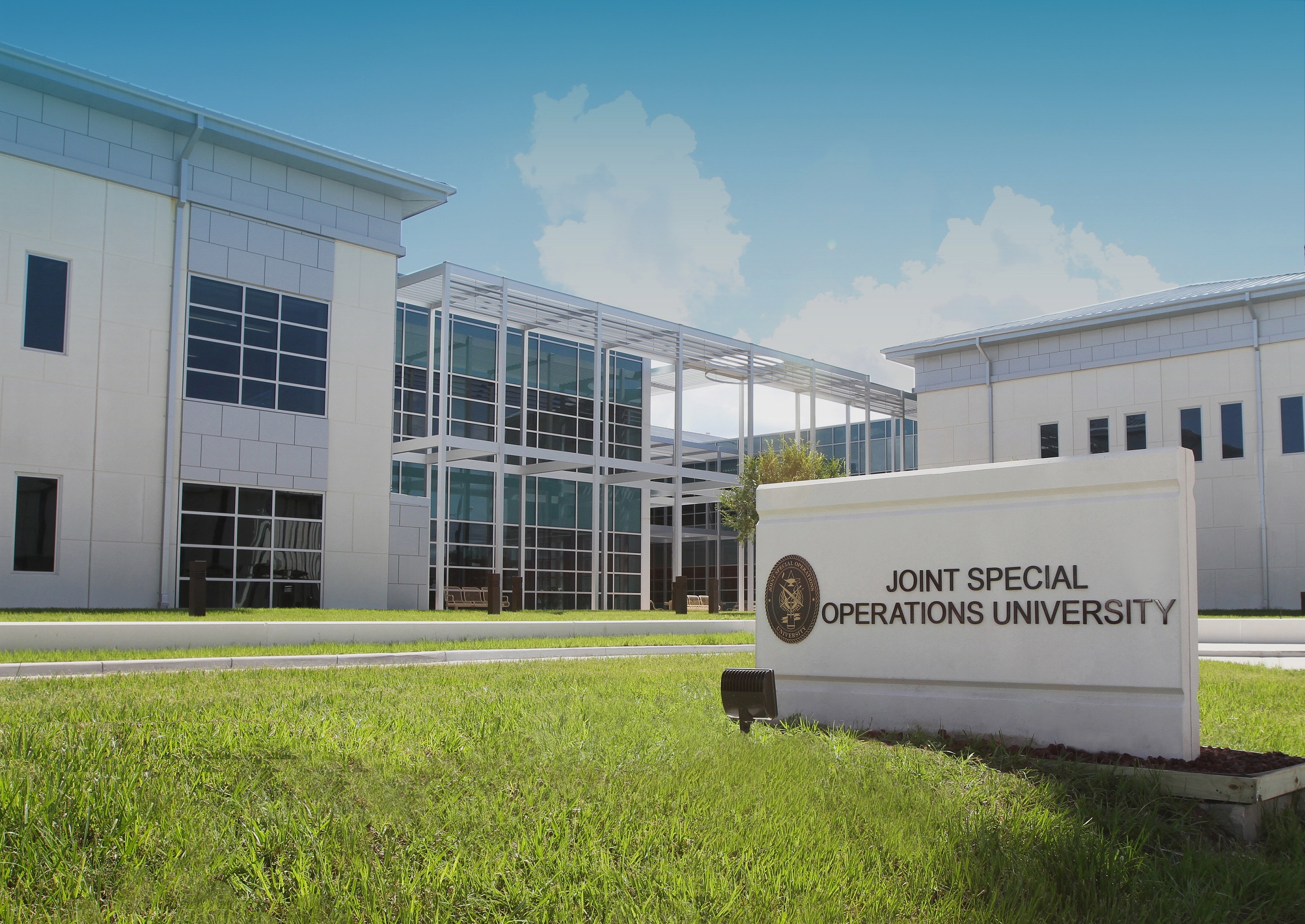
- Active: September 2000
- Country: United States
- Type: Special Operations education
- Role: JSOU prepares SOF professionals to address strategic and operational challenges, arming them with the ability to think through problems with knowledge, insight, and foresight.
- Part of: United States Special Operations Command
- Garrison/HQ: MacDill Air Force Base
- Nickname: JSOU

The Joint Special Operations University (JSOU) is the designated agency within United States Special Operations Command (USSOCOM) to conduct joint special operations force (SOF) education and thus is tasked with and directed to provide relevant, realistic, leading-edge education opportunities to military and civilian special operations forces personnel around the world, located at MacDill Air Force Base, Florida, United States.

Capable of full-spectrum joint SOF focused instruction, JSOU provides cohesive education support to SOF personnel, and other non-SOF decision makers at intermediate and senior levels. The university conducts off-station tutorials and courses as well as video teleconferencing instruction to supported units worldwide.

== JSOU Education ==
JSOU delivers unique SOF educational opportunities through residence and distance learning (and combined) courses. It also supports SOF curriculum within the service professional military education schools both through liaisons and SOF chairs at most PME institutions. JSOU faculty are regularly called upon to teach SOF-related blocks of instruction at PME institutions across the country. Additionally, through their mobile training teams, they conduct educational events for countries all over the world on a wide range of subjects, including support to resistance, the strategic effects of SOF, and design.
