= M. S. Ramaiah =

Indian educationist, philanthropist, industrialist (1922–1997)

- ಎಂ. ಎಸ್. ರಾಮಯ್ಯ
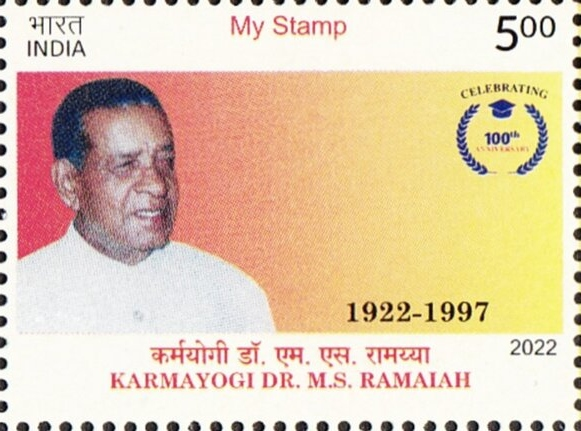
- Ramaiah on a 2022 stamp of India

Personal details
- Born: 20 April 1922 Madhugiri, Kingdom of Mysore, British India
- Died: 25 December 1997 (aged 75) Bangalore, Karnataka, India
- Spouses: Venkatamma; Laxmigowramma
- Parent(s): Sampangappa Ramaiah; Narasamma
- Profession: Engineering contractor; educationist; industrialist; philanthropist

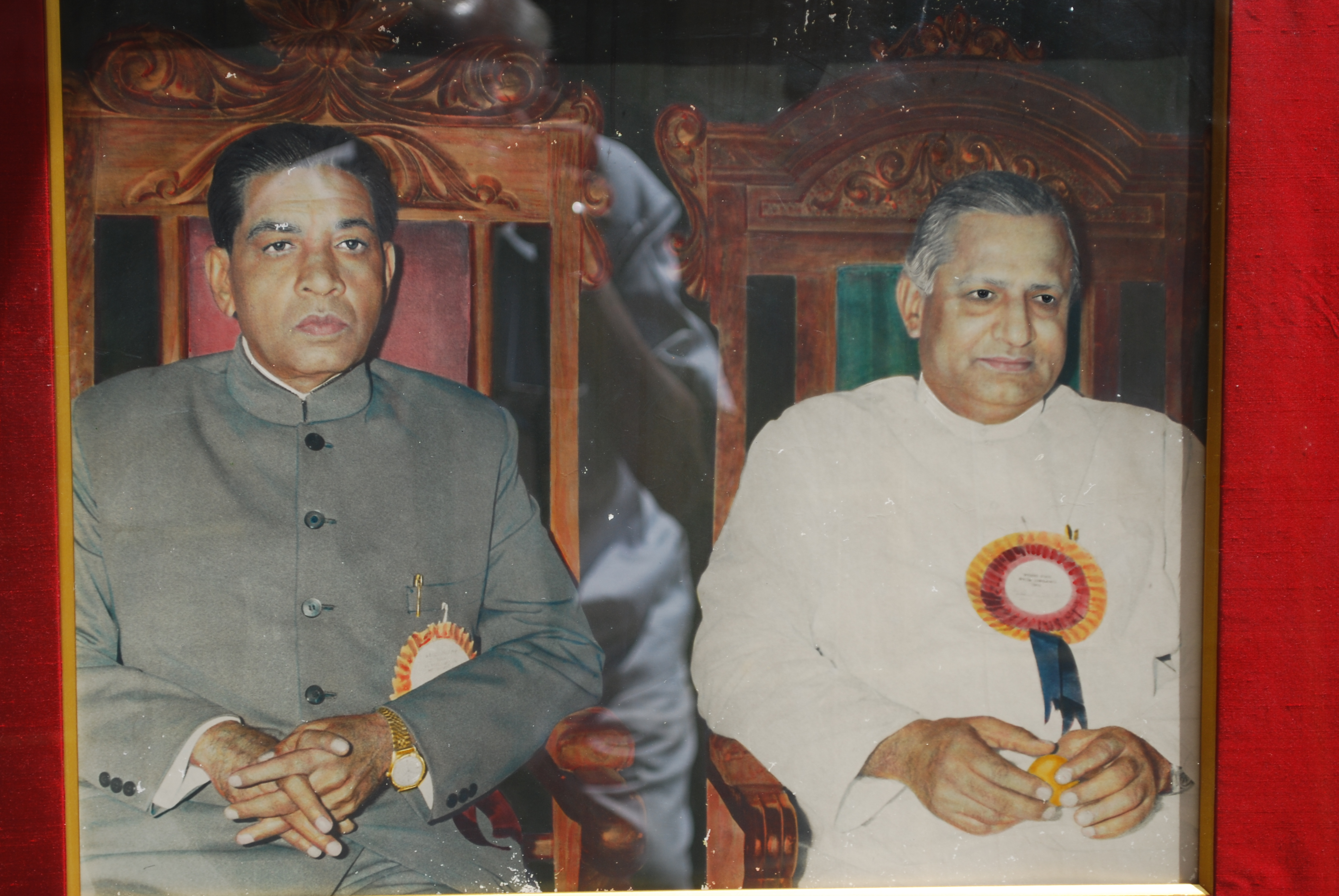
MS Ramaiah, with Devraj Urs, former Chief Minister of Karnataka, 1972–1977

Mathikere Sampige Ramaiah (20 April 1922 – 25 December 1997) was an educationist, philanthropist, and industrialist, involved in infrastructure projects in India.

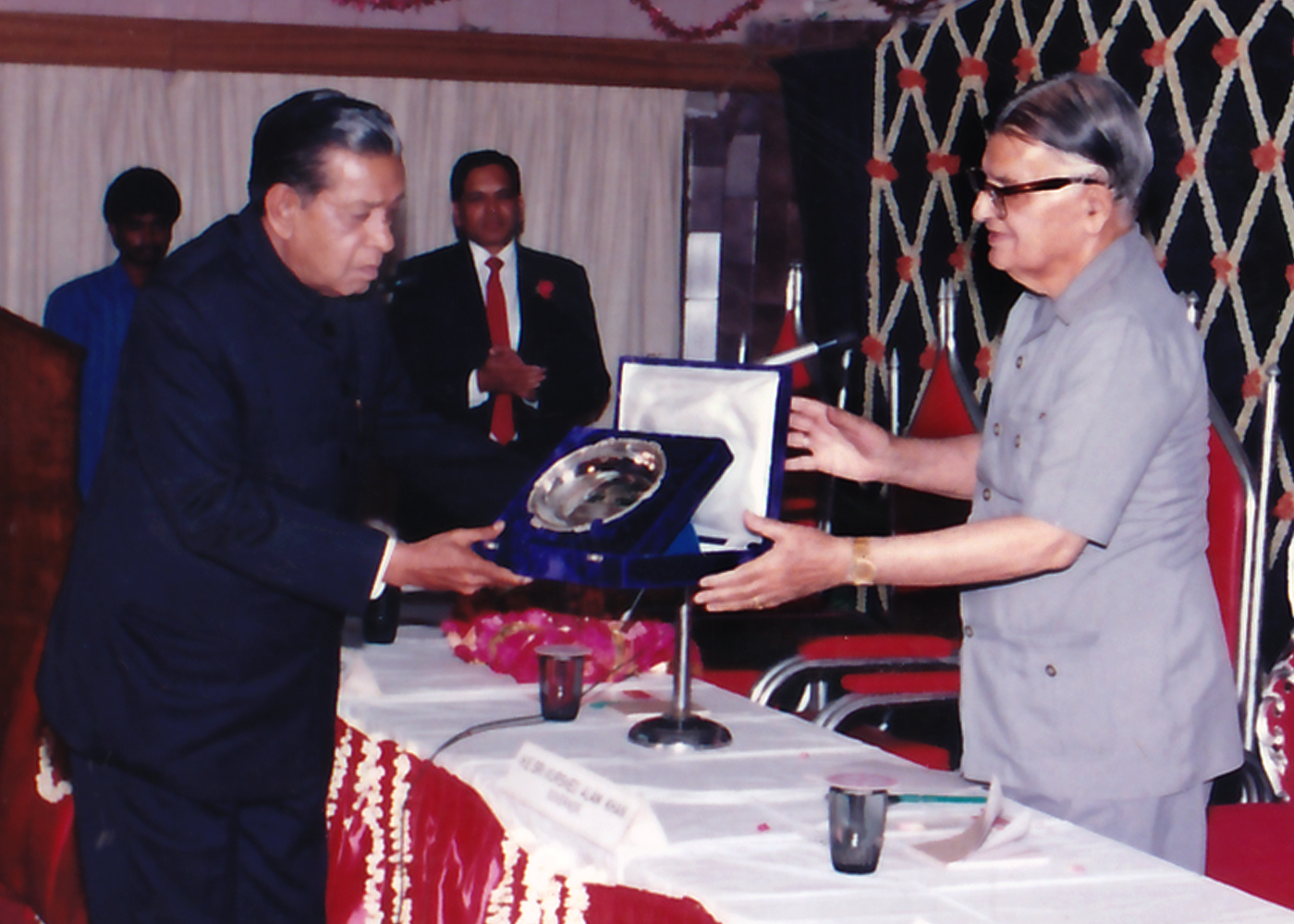
MS Ramaiah, with H.E. Khurshid Alam Khan, Governor of Karnataka, 1991–1999

== Early life ==
Mathikere Sampangi Ramaiah was born on 20 April 1922, in Madhugiri to Sampangappa and Narasamma. He completed his primary education in Mathikere, which was then in the outskirts of Bangalore city and then moved on to agriculture due to paucity of funds. Later he went to work for the Indian Railways as a fireman for the Mysore Narrow Gauge Steam rail, for about two years.

As a contractor, he started off as a supplier of bricks for military camps in Bangalore during World War II. His immense success in the field of civil works was marked by the construction of some of the major projects in the state, such as the canals of the Ghataprabha Project, Talakalale Dam and the Dharma Project.

== Achievements ==
=== MSR Group of Institutions ===
In 1962, Ramaiah established the Gokula Education Foundation, which marked the beginning of the Ramaiah Institute of Technology (MSRIT, Bangalore). In 1979, the M. S. Ramaiah Medical College was set up and as a requisite for medical education, the M. S. Ramaiah Teaching Hospital was founded. With a vision of a multi-specialty center, the M. S. Ramaiah Institute of Nephro-urology, M. S. Ramaiah Institute of Oncology and M. S. Ramaiah Institute of Cardiology was set up; the founding of M. S. Ramaiah Medical Teaching Hospital in 1985 added on to his list of milestones.

Institutions founded by M.S. Ramaiah:

- 1962: M. S. Ramaiah Institute of Technology
- 1979: M. S. Ramaiah Medical College
- 1985: M. S. Ramaiah Medical Teaching Hospital
- 1987: M. S. Ramaiah Institute of Nursing Education & Research
- 1991: M. S. Ramaiah Dental College
- 1992: M. S. Ramaiah College of Pharmacy; M. S. Ramaiah Institute of Hotel Management
- 1993: M. S. Ramaiah Composite Junior College
- 1994: M. S. Ramaiah College of Arts, Science & Commerce; M. S. Ramaiah Vidhyaniketan
- 1995: M. S. Ramaiah Institute of Management
- 1996: M. S. Ramaiah Institute of Physical Medicine & Rehabilitation; P G Course in Nursing [MSc (N)]
- 1997: M. S. Ramaiah Polytechnic
- 1999: M. S. Ramaiah School of Advanced Studies, now M S Ramaiah University of Applied Sciences
- 2004: M. S. Ramaiah College of Education
- 2006: M. S. Ramaiah International Medical School
- 2012: M. S. Ramaiah Advanced Learning Center; M. S. Ramaiah Institute of Neurosciences; M. S. Ramaiah Clinical Research Centre
- 2013: M. S. Ramaiah University of Applied Sciences
- 2019: M. S. Ramaiah capital Pvt Ltd

== Religion ==
Ramaiah was a deeply religious Hindu. He left an indelible mark in all his activities, as the President of Karnataka’s ancient shrine Kaiwara. In renovating the Ashram of Yogi Narayana Yatindra, the space provided sanctuary to a huge number of devotees along with the provision of free food every day. He organized for the giving away of alms at religious congregations, particularly Sadhu Sangama.

== Industrialisation ==
With M Vishweswariah as a role model, Ramaiah believed in industrialization and was its pioneer. The industries he promoted include:

- Kvaerner John Brown (India) Pvt. Ltd
- M. S. R. & Sons Investments Ltd
- Indo-Malaysian Technopolis Pvt. Ltd
- M. S. Ramaiah Investments and Properties Ltd

== Journalism ==
Being a multi-faceted personality with a political opinion, Ramaiah developed a deep interest in journalism. In 1956, he acquired Thainadu, then the oldest Kannada daily in Mysore State, and not only led for it to thrive, but he also started Gokula, a Kannada weekly, and Kailasa, a monthly. These became a herald of a neo-tri-colour nationalist era and are considered as model publications even today.

== Humanitarian and philanthropic initiatives ==
The setting up of M. S. Ramaiah Charities Trust was designed with the goal of assisting those of marginalized backgrounds in India. Through that end, the trust provides a scholarship of around 25 lakhs to exemplary and backward class students annually. It also supports scholarships for candidates appearing for civil service exams such as the IAS and IPS.

Realising the importance of development in any society, Ramaiah was responsible for the construction of housing facilities for poor and middle-class families to live at reasonable and affordable prices. Earlier a suburb, the locality has now turned into a modern downtown of a quarter million population.

Being the Chairman of the Reception Committee, he organised the Kannada Sahithya Sammelana at Kaiwara in 1990. This hosted the perfect suburban setting for the neoteric and literary minds of Kannada literature to convene.

== Honours and awards ==
- Doctor of Letters, Honoris Causa, Tumkur University, posthumous
- Doctor of Science, Visvesvaraya Technological University, Belgaum, posthumous
