= List of private universities in India =

State private universities in India are regulated under the UGC (Establishment and Maintenance of Standards in Private University) Regulations, 2003. Per these regulations, state private universities are established by an Act of a State Legislative Assembly and listed by the UGC in the Gazette upon receiving the Act. The UGC sends committees to inspect the state private universities and publishes their inspection report.

The UGC publishes and regularly updates the lists of state private universities. The earliest date of notification is that of Sikkim Manipal University, 11 October 1995. State private universities were established in 26 of the 28 states of India and in none of the 8 union territories.

Section 12 (B) of the UGC Act of 1956 also grants the UGC the right to "allocate and disburse, out of the Fund of the Commission, grants to Universities..." As such, the UGC may declare a state private university as "Included under Section 12(B) of the UGC Act, 1956", making them eligible to receive government grants. Updates to these declarations are done in meetings of the UGC and published in the minutes.

== Universities by state ==
State private universities in India by state
State	Listed under Section 12 (B)?		Total universities
State	Yes	No	Total universities
Andhra Pradesh	0	13	13
Arunachal Pradesh	0	8	8
Assam	2	9	11
Bihar	0	8	8
Chhattisgarh	2	16	18
Goa	0	1	1
Gujarat	1	65	66
Haryana	5	20	25
Himachal Pradesh	0	17	17
Jharkhand	0	18	18
Karnataka	1	28	29
Madhya Pradesh	1	53	54
Maharashtra	1	39	40
Manipur	0	4	4
Meghalaya	0	8	8
Mizoram	0	1	1
Nagaland	0	4	4
Odisha	3	9	12
Punjab	4	17	21
Rajasthan	7	46	53
Sikkim	0	26	26
Tamil Nadu	0	9	9
Telangana	0	11	11
Tripura	0	5	5
Uttar Pradesh	7	46	53
Uttarakhand	1	30	31
West Bengal	0	11	11
Total	35	522	557

== List of universities ==
In the list below, the year of establishment is the year stated by the UGC as "Date of Notification". Cases where this year is different than the year stated by the university are noted. Differences in title are also noted, except minor typographical errors and "University of X"/"X University" differences. Inspection report data is from the lists of state private university per state and individual reports are sourced where available.

=== Andhra Pradesh ===
There are 13 state private universities in Andhra Pradesh.

State private universities of Andhra Pradesh
University	Location	Inspection report?	Established	Specialization	Sources
Aditya University	Kakinada	No	2016	General	
Annamacharya University	Rajampet	No	2016	General	
B.E.S.T Innovation University	Anantapur	No	2019	Technology	
Centurion University of Technology and Management, Andhra Pradesh	Visakhapatnam	No	2017	Technology, management	
Godavari Global University	Rajamahendravaram	No	2024	Technology	
Krea University	Sri City	No	2018	General	
Mohan Babu University	Tirupati	No	2022	General	
Saveetha Amaravati University	Amaravati	No	2018 (Note: The university's logo states 2017.)	General	
SRM University, Andhra Pradesh	Amaravati	No	2017	General	
The Apollo University	Chittoor	No	2021	General	
Vasireddy Venkatadri International Technological University	Guntur	No	2007	Technology	
Veltech University	Amaravathi	No	2016	Technology	
VIT-AP University	Amaravati	Yes	2017	General	

=== Arunachal Pradesh ===
There are eight state private universities in Arunachal Pradesh.

State private universities of Arunachal Pradesh
University	Location	Inspection report?	Established	Specialization	Sources
Apex Professional University	NH 52, 2nd Mile, Gumin Nagar	No	2013	General	
Arunachal University of Studies	Namsai	No	2012	General	
Arunodaya University	Itanagar	No	2014	General	
Himalayan University	Itanagar	No	2013	General	
Indira Gandhi Technological and Medical Sciences University	Ziro	No	2012	General	
North East Frontier Technical University	Aalo	No	2014	General	
The Global University	Itanagar	No	2017	General	
Venkateshwara Open University	Naharlagun	No	2012	General	

=== Assam ===
There are 11 state private universities in Assam, two of which were declared fit under Section 12 (B).

State private universities of Assam
University	Location	Inspection report?	Established	Specialization	Sources
Assam Don Bosco University (Note: Declared fit under Section 12 (B).)	Guwahati	Yes	2009	General	
Assam Down Town University	Guwahati	Yes	2010	General	
Auniati University	Teok, Jorhat	No	2022	General	
EdTech Skills University	Tinsukia	No	2025	Technology	
Girijananda Chowdhury University	Guwahati	No	2022	General	
Kaziranga University (Note: Listed by the name in the act "The Assam Kaziranga University".)	Jorhat	Yes	2012	General	
Krishnaguru Adhyatmik Vishvavidyalaya (Note: Listed with a different spelling "Krishnaguru Adhyatmik Vishwavidyalaya".)	Sarthebari	No	2017	General	
Mahapurusha Srimanta Sankaradeva Viswavidyalaya	Nagaon	No	2013	Humanities	
Pragjyotishpur University	Guwahati	No	2022	General	
Royal Global University (Note: Listed by the name in the act "The Assam Royal Global University".)	Guwahati	No	2013	General	
Swami Vivekanand University	Kokrajhar	No	2025	General	

=== Bihar ===
There are eight state private universities in Bihar.

State private universities of Bihar
University	Location	Inspection report?	Established	Specialization	Sources
Al-Karim University	Katihar	Yes	2018	Medicine	
Amity University, Patna	Patna	No	2017	General	
Dr. C.V. Raman University, Bihar	Bhagwanpur	No	2018	General	
Gopal Narayan Singh University	Jamuhar	Yes	2018	General	
K. K. University	Nalanda	No	2017	General	
Mata Gujri University	Kishanganj	No	2019	Medicine	
Sandip University, Sijoul	Madhubani	No	2017	General	
Xavier University	Patna	No	2025	General	

=== Chhattisgarh ===
There are 18 state private universities in Chhattisgarh, two of which were declared fit under Section 12 (B).

State private universities of Chhattisgarh
University	Location	Inspection report?	Established	Specialization	Sources
AAFT University of Media and Arts	Raipur	No	2018	Media and arts	
Amity University, Raipur	Raipur	No	2014	General	
Anjaneya University	Raipur	No	2008	General	
Bharti Vishwavidyalay	Chankhuri Durg	No	2021	General	
Dev Sanskriti Vishwavidyalaya	Durg	No	2018	General	
Dr. C.V. Raman University	Kota	Yes	2006	General	
ICFAI University, Raipur	Raipur	No	2011	Management	
ISBM University	Chhura	No	2016	General	
ITM University, Raipur	Naya Raipur	No	2012	General	
K. K. Modi University	Durg	No	2005	General	
Kalinga University	Raipur	No	2012	General	
Maharishi University of Management and Technology	Bilaspur	No	2002	Technology, management	
MATS University	Raipur	Yes	2006	General	
O.P. Jindal University	Raigarh	No	2014	Technology, management	
Rungta International Skills University	Bhilai	No	2025	Skill	
Shri Davara University	Naya Raipur	No	2024	General	
Shri Rawatpura Sarkar University	Raipur	No	2018	General	
Shri Shankaracharya Professional University	Bhilai	No	2020	General	

=== Goa ===
There is one state private universities in Goa.

State private universities of Goa
University	Location	Inspection report?	Established	Specialization	Sources
India International University of Legal Education and Research	South Goa	No	2022	Law	

=== Gujarat ===
There are 66 state private universities in Gujarat, one of which was declared fit under Section 12 (B).

State private universities of Gujarat
University	Location	Inspection report?	Established	Specialization	Sources
Adani University	Ahmedabad	No	2022	General	
Ahmedabad University	Ahmedabad	Yes	2009	General	
Anant National University	Ahmedabad	No	2016	Architecture	
Atmiya University	Rajkot	No	2018	Technology, management	
AURO University (Note: Listed by its former name "AURO University of Hospitality and Management".)	Surat	Yes	2011	General	
Bhagwan Mahavir University	Surat	No	2001	General	
Bhaikaka University	Anand	No	2019	Medicine	
C. U. Shah University	Surendranagar	Yes	2013	General	
CEPT University (Note: Listed by its former name "Centre for Environmental Planning and Technology University".)	Ahmedabad	No	2005	Architecture	
Charotar University of Science and Technology	Changa	Yes	2009	Technology, management	
Darshan University	Rajkot	No	2021	General	
Dhirubhai Ambani Institute of Information and Communication Technology	Gandhinagar	Yes	2003	Technology	
Dr. Subhash University	Junagadh	No	2022	General	
Drs. Kiran & Pallavi Patel Global University (KPGU)	Vadodara	No	2021	General	
GLS University	Ahmedabad	No	2016	General	
Gandhinagar University	Gandhinagar	No	2009	General	
Ganpat University	Mehsana	Yes	2005	General	
Gujarat Maritime University	Gandhinagar	No	2017	Maritime	
Gokul Global University	Siddhpur	No	2018	General	
Gyanmanjari Innovative University	Bhavnagar	No	2023	General	
GSFC University	Vadodara	No	2014 (Note: The university lists 2015 as the year of official launching and starting operation. The UGC lists 2014, the year of the Act.)	Engineering	
Indian Institute of Public Health, Gandhinagar	Gandhinagar	No	2015	Public health	
Indrashil University	Ahmedabad	No	2017	Engineering, Sciences	
Indus University	Ahmedabad	Yes	2012	General	
Institute of Advanced Research	Gandhinagar	Yes (Note: No report is available from the UGC website.)	2011	General	
ITM (SLS) Baroda University	Vadodara	No	2019		
ITM Vocational University	Waghodia	No	2014	General	
J.G. University	Ahmedabad	No	2009	Business & technology	
K. N. University	Ahmedabad	No	2019	General	
Kadi Sarva Vishwavidyalaya	Gandhinagar	Yes	2007	General	
Karnavati University	Gandhinagar	No	2017	General	
Lakulish Yoga University	Ahmedabad	No	2013	Yoga	
Lok Jagruti Kendra University	Ahmedabad	No	2019	General	
Lokbharti University for Rural Innovation	Bhavnagar	No	2022	General	
M. K. University	Patan	No	2022	General	
Maganbhai Adenwala Mahagujarat University	Nadiad	No	2022	General	
Marwadi University	Rajkot	No	2016	General	
Monark University	Ahmedabad	No	2001	General	
Navrachana University	Vadodara	Yes	2009	General	
Nirma University	Ahmedabad	Yes	2003	Technology	
Noble University	Junagadh	No	2007	General	
P P Savani University	Kosamba	No	2017	General	
Pandit Deendayal Energy University	Gandhinagar	Yes	2007	Energy	
Parul University	Vadodara	No	2015	General	
Plastindia International University	Vapi	No	2016	Plastics engineering	
Rai University	Ahmedabad	Yes	2012	General	
Rajju Shroff Rofel University (RSRU)	Valsad	No	2023	General	
RK University	Rajkot	Yes	2011	General	
Sabarmati University	Ahmedabad	Yes	2009	General	
Sankalchand Patel University	Visnagar	No	2016	General	
Sardar Vallabhbhai Global University	Ahmedabad	No	2023	General	
Sarvajanik University	Surat	No	2021	General	
Shreyarth University	Ahmedabad	No	2019	General	
Sigma University	Vadodara	No	2002	General	
Silver Oak University	Ahmedabad	No	2019	General	
SKIPS University	Gandhinagar	No	2023	General	
Surendranagar University	Surendranagar	No	2022	general	
Swaminarayan University	Gandhinagar	No	2022	General	
Swarnim Startup & Innovation University	Gandhinagar	No	2017	General	
TeamLease Skills University	Vadodara	No	2013	General	
The Charutar Vidya Mandal(CVM) University	Anand, Gujarat	No	2019	General	
Transstadia University	Ahmedabad	No	2019	general	
Uka Tarsadia University	Bardoli	Yes	2011	General	
UPL University of Sustainable Technology	Bharuch	No	2021	Technology	
Vanita Vishram Women's University	Surat	No	2021	Women	
Vidhyadeep University	Surat	No	2011	General	

=== Haryana ===
There are 25 state private universities in Haryana, two of which were declared fit under Section 12 (B).

State private universities of Haryana
University	Location	Inspection report?	Established	Specialization	Sources
Al-Falah University	Faridabad	Yes	2014	General	
Amity University, Gurgaon	Pachgaon	Yes	2010	General	
Ansal University	Gurgaon	Yes	2012	General	
Apeejay Stya University	Sohna	Yes	2010	General	
Ashoka University	Sonepat	Yes	2014	General	
Baba Mast Nath University	Rohtak	Yes (Note: Oddly, the UGC list says no expert committee was constituted, but includes a report from such a committee.)	2012	General	
BML Munjal University	Sidhrawali	Yes	2014	Technology, management	
GD Goenka University	Gurgaon	Yes	2013	General	
Geeta University	Panipat	No	2022	General	
IILM University	Gurgaon	No	2018	Management	
Jagan Nath University	Jhajjar	Yes	2013	General	
K.R. Mangalam University	Gurgaon	Yes	2013	General	
Maharishi Markandeshwar University, Sadopur	Ambala	Yes	2010	General	
Manav Rachna University	Faridabad	No	2014	Technology, management	
MVN University	Palwal	Yes	2012	General	
NIILM University, Kaithal	Kaithal	No	2011	Technology, management	
Om Sterling Global University	Hisar	No	2019	General	
PDM University	Bahadurgarh	No	2016	General	
Rishihood University	Sonipat	No	2020	Social sciences	
Sanskaram University	Jhajjar	No	2015	General	
Shree Guru Gobind Singh Tricentenary University	Gurgaon	Yes	2013	General	
SRM University, Haryana	Sonepat	Yes	2013	General	
Starex University	Gurgaon	No	2016	General	
The NorthCap University	Gurgaon	Yes	2009	Technology, management	
World University of Design	Sonipat	No	2018	Design, management	

=== Himachal Pradesh ===
There are 17 state private universities in Himachal Pradesh.

State private universities of Himachal Pradesh
University	Location	Inspection report?	Established	Specialization	Sources
Abhilashi University	Mandi	Yes	2015	General	
Alakh Prakash Goyal University	Shimla	Yes	2012	General	
Arni University	Kangra	Yes	2009	General	
Baddi University of Emerging Sciences and Technologies	Baddi	Yes	2009	Technology	
Bahra University	Waknaghat	Yes	2011	General	
Career Point University, Hamirpur	Bhoranj	Yes	2012	General	
Chitkara University, Himachal Pradesh	Solan	Yes	2009	Science and technology	
Eternal University	Baru Sahib	Yes	2008	General	
ICFAI University, Himachal Pradesh	Solan	No	2011	Technology, management	
IEC University	Solan	Yes	2012	General	
Indus International University	Haroli	Yes	2010	General	
Jaypee University of Information Technology	Waknaghat	Yes	2002	Information technology	
Maharaja Agrasen University	Solan	Yes	2013	General	
Maharishi Markandeshwar University, Solan	Solan	No	2010	General	
Manav Bharti University	Solan	Yes	2009	General	
Shoolini University of Biotechnology and Management Sciences	Solan	Yes	2009	Biotechnology	
Sri Sai University	Palampur	Yes	2011	General	

=== Jharkhand ===
There are 18 state private universities in Jharkhand.

State private universities of Jharkhand
University	Location	Inspection report?	Established	Specialization	Sources
AISECT University, Jharkhand	Hazaribagh	No	2016	General	
Amity University, Jharkhand	Ranchi	No	2016	General	
Arka Jain University	Jamshedpur	No	2017	General	
Babu Dinesh Singh University	Garhwa	No	2023	General	
Capital University, Jharkhand	Koderma	No	2018	General	
Durga Soren University	Deoghar	No	2023	General	
ICFAI University, Jharkhand	Ranchi	No	2008	Management	
Jharkhand Rai University	Ranchi	No	2012	General	
Netaji Subhas University	Jamshedpur	No	2018	Management	
Pragyan International University	Ranchi	No	2016	General	
Radha Govind University	Ramgarh	No	2018	General	
Ram Krishna Dharmarth Foundation (RKDF) University	Ranchi	No	2018	General	
Ramchandra Chandravansi University	Palamu	No	2018	General	
Sai Nath University	Ranchi	No	2012	General	
Sarala Birla University	Ranchi	No	2017	General	
Sona Devi University	East Singhbhum	No	2023	General	
Usha Martin University	Ranchi	No	2014 (Note: The university lists 2012, the year of the act.)	General	
YBN University	Ranchi	No	2017	General	

=== Karnataka ===
There are 29 state private universities in Karnataka, one of which was declared fit under Section 12 (B).

State private universities of Karnataka
University	Location	Inspection report?	Established	Specialization	Sources
Adichunchanagiri University	Mandya	No	2018	General	
Alliance University	Bengaluru	Yes	2010	Management	
Atria University	Bengaluru	No	2018	Science and technology	
Azim Premji University	Bengaluru	Yes	2010	General	
Chanakya University	Bengaluru	No	2022	General	
CMR University	Bengaluru	No	2013	General	
Dayananda Sagar University	Bengaluru	No	2014	General	
G. M. University	Davanagere District	No	2023	General	
Garden City University	Bengaluru	No	2013	General	
JSS Science and Technology University	Mysuru	No	2016	Science and technology	
Khaja Bandanawaz University	Kalaburagi	No	2018	General	
Kishkinda University	Ballari	No	2023	Technology	
KLE Technological University	Hubbali	No	2015	Technology	
M. S. Ramaiah University of Applied Sciences	Bengaluru	Yes	2013	General	
PES University	Bengaluru	Yes	2013	General	
Presidency University	Bengaluru	No	2013	Technology, management, law	
Rai Technology University	Bengaluru	No	2014	General	
REVA University	Bengaluru	Yes	2013	General	
RV University	Bengaluru	No	2021	Liberal education, general	
Sapthagiri NPS University	Bengaluru	No	2022	Technology	
Sharnbasva University	Kalaburagi	No	2017	General	
Shri Dharmasthala Manjunatheshwara University	Dharwad	No	2019	General	
Sri Jagadhguru Murugarajendra University	Chitradurga	No	2020	General	
Swami Vivekananda Yoga Anusandhana Samsthana (S-VYASA)	Bengaluru	No	2002	Yoga, Science and Technology	
Sri Sathya Sai University for Human Excellence	Kalburgi	No	2019	General	
Srinivas University	Mangaluru	No	2015	General	
St. Joseph's University, Bengaluru	Bengaluru	No	1882	General	
University of Trans-Disciplinary Health Sciences and Technology	Bengaluru	No	2013	Technology	
Vidyashilp University	Bengaluru	No	2021	General	

=== Madhya Pradesh ===
There are 54 state private universities in Madhya Pradesh.

State private universities of Madhya Pradesh
University	Location	Inspection report?	Established	Specialization	Sources
AKS University	Satna	Yes	2011	Agricultural, technology	
Abhyuday University	Khargone	No	2024	General	
Amaltas University	Dewas	No	2013	Medicine	
Amity University, Gwalior	Gwalior	No (Note: The UGC list of private universities in Madhya Pradesh lists the university as having not gone through inspection, but supplies an inspection report.)	2010	General	
Aryavart University	Sehore	No	2023	General	
Avantika University	Ujjain	No	2017	Technology	
Azim Premji University	Bhopal	No	2023	General	
Bhabha University	Bhopal	No	2018	General	
Chirayu University	Bhainsakhedi	No	2023	Medicine	
Dr. A.P.J. Abdul Kalam University	Indore	No	2016	General	
Dr. C.V. Raman University, Khandwa	Khandwa	No	2018	General	
Dr. Preeti Global University	Shivpuri	No	2022	General	
Eklavya University	Damoh	No	2020	General	
G.H. Raisoni University	Chhindwara	No	2016	General	
Gyanodaya University	Neemuch	No	2023	General	
Gyanveer University	Sagar	No	2022	General	
ITM University, Gwalior	Gwalior	Yes	2011	General	
I.E.S. University	Bhopal	No	2019	Technology	
J. N. C. T professional University	Bhopal	No	2023	General	
Jagran Lakecity University	Bhopal	No (Note: The October 2018 version of the UGC list of private universities in Madhya Pradesh lists the university as having gone through inspection, but no report is provided.)	2013	General	
Jaypee University of Engineering and Technology	Guna	Yes	2010	Technology	
LNCT University	Bhopal	Yes	2015	General	
LNCT Vidhyapeeth University	Indore	No	2021	Medicine	
Mandsaur University	Mandsaur	No	2016	General	
Madhyanchal Professional University	Bhopal	No	2018	General	
Mahakaushal University	Jabalpur	No	2021	General	
Maharishi Mahesh Yogi Vedic University	Katni	No	1995	General	
Malwanchal University	Indore	No	2016	General	
Mangalayatan University	Jabalpur	No	2019	General	
Mansarovar Global University	Sehore	No	2018	General	
Medi-Caps University	Indore	No	2000	General	
Oriental University	Indore	Yes	2011	General	
P.K. University	Shivpuri	No	2011	General	
Prestige University	Indore	No	2022	Business	
People's University	Bhopal	Yes	2011	Healthcare	
Rabindranath Tagore University	Bhopal	Yes (Note: The October 2018 version of the UGC list of private universities in Madhya Pradesh lists the university as having gone through inspection, and "Compliance of observation/deficiencies accepted", but no report is provided.)	2010	General	
Renaissance University	Indore	No	2018	General	
RKDF University	Bhopal	No	2011	Science, technology	
Sage University	Indore	No	2017	General	
Sri Satya Sai University of Technology & Medical Sciences	Sehore	No	2014	Medicine	
SAM Global University	Bhopal	Yes (Note: The August 2019 version of the UGC list of private universities in Madhya Pradesh lists the university as having gone through inspection, and "Compliance of observation/deficiencies accepted", but no report is provided.)	2019	General	
Sanjeev Agrawal Global Educational (SAGE) University	Bhopal	No	2020	General	
Sardar Patel University	Balaghat	No	2018	General	
Sarvepalli Radhakrishnan University	Bhopal	No	1995	General	
Scope Global Skills University	Bhopal	No	2023	General	
Shri Krishna University	Chhatarpur	No	2018	General	
Shri Vaishnav Vidyapeeth Vishwavidyalaya	Indore	No	2015	General	
Shubham University	Bhopal district	No	2022	General	
Sri Aurobindo University	Indore	No	2021	Medicine	
Swami Vivekanand University	Sagar	No	2011	General	
Symbiosis University of Applied Sciences	Indore	No	2016	Technology	
Techno Global University	Vidisha	No	2013	Technology	
Vikrant University	Gwalior	No	2022	General	
VIT Bhopal University	Sehore	No	2017	Technology	

=== Maharashtra ===
There are 33 state private universities in Maharashtra, one of which was declared fit under Section 12 (B).

State private universities of Maharashtra
University	Location	Inspection report?	Established	Specialization	Sources
Ajeenkya DY Patil University	Pune	Yes	2015	General	
Alard University	Pune	No	1999	General	
Amity University, Mumbai	Mumbai	No	2014	General	
ATLAS SkillTech University	Mumbai	No	2021	Technology	
Atharva University	Mumbai	No	2024	general	
Chhatrapati Shivaji Maharaj University	Mumbai	No	2018	General	
D Y Patil International University	Pune	No	2018	General	
D. Y. Patil Agriculture and Technical University	Kolhapur	No	2021	Technology	
D. Y. Patil University	Pune	No	2019	General	
DES Pune University	Pune	No	2023	General	
Dr. D.Y. Patil Dnyan Prasad	Pune	No	2003	General	
Dr. P. A. Inamdar University	Pune	No	2002	General	
FLAME University	Pune	No	2015	General	
G.H.Raisoni University	Amravati	No	2018	General	
ITM Skills University	Navi Mumbai	No	2022	General	
JSPM University	Pune	No	2023	General	
MGM University	Aurangabad	No	2019	General	
MIT - World Peace University	Pune	No	2017	General	
MIT Art, Design and Technology University	Pune	No	2015	Technology	
MIT Vishwaprayag University, Solapur	Solapur	No	2023	General	
NICMAR University	Pune	No	2022	Management	
Pillai University	Navi Mumbai	No	2025	General	
Pimpri Chinchwad University	Pune	No	2022	General	
Ramdeobaba University	Nagpur	No	2019	Technology	,
Sandip University, Nashik	Nashik	Yes	2015	General	
Sanjay Ghodawat University	Kolhapur	No	2017	General	
Sanjivani University	Ahmednagar	No	2024	General	
Somaiya Vidyavihar University	Mumbai	No	2019	General	
Spicer Adventist University	Pune	No	2014	General	
Sri Balaji University, Pune	Pune	No	2019	General	
Symbiosis Skills and Professional University	Pune	No	2017	General	
The SVKM NMIMS Global University	Dhule	No	2023	General	
Vishwakarma University	Pune	No	2017	General	
Universal Ai University	Karjat	No	2023	Management, technology	

=== Manipur ===
There are four state private universities in Manipur.

State private universities of Manipur
University	Location	Inspection report?	Established	Specialization	Sources
Asian International University	Imphal	No	2021	General	
Bir Tikendrajit University	Imphal	No	2020	General	
Khongnangthaba University	Imphal	No	2021	General	
Manipur International University	Imphal	No	2018	General	

=== Meghalaya ===
There are 8 state private universities in Meghalaya.

State private universities of Meghalaya
University	Location	Inspection report?	Established	Specialization	Sources
CMJ University	Shillong	Yes	2009	General	
Institute of Chartered Financial Analysts of India University, Meghalaya	Tura	No	2009	Management	
Mahatma Gandhi University	Nongpoh	No	2011	Management	
Martin Luther Christian University	Shillong	Yes	2005	General	
Techno Global University	Shillong	Yes	2008	Technology	
University of Science and Technology, Meghalaya (USTM)	Ri-Bhoi	Yes	2008	Technology, management	
University of Technology and Management	Shillong	Yes	2011	Technology, management	
William Carey University	Shillong	No	2005	General	

=== Mizoram ===
There is one state private university in Mizoram.

State private universities of Mizoram
University	Location	Inspection report?	Established	Specialization	Sources
Institute of Chartered Financial Analysts of India University, Mizoram	Aizawl	Yes	2006	Management	

=== Nagaland ===
There are four state private universities in Nagaland.

State private universities of Nagaland
University	Location	Inspection report?	Established	Specialization	Sources
The Global Open University Nagaland	Chümoukedima	Yes	2006	Distance education	
Institute of Chartered Financial Analysts of India University, Nagaland	Chümoukedima	Yes	2009	Management	
North East Christian University	Dimapur	No	2013	General	
St. Joseph University	Chümoukedima	No	2016	Technology, management	

=== Odisha ===
There are 12 state private universities in Odisha, three of which were declared fit under Section 12 (B).

State private universities of Odisha
University	Location	Inspection report?	Established	Specialization	Sources
AIPH University	Bhubaneswar	No	2018	Public health	
ASBM University	Bhubaneswar	No	2019	Management	
Birla Global University	Bhubaneswar	No	2013	Social sciences and management	
C. V. Raman Global University	Bhubaneswar	No	2020	General	
Centurion University of Technology and Management	Bhubaneswar	Yes	2010	Technology, management	
DRIEMS University	Cuttack	No	2022	General	
GIET University	Gunupur	No	2018	General	
Jagadguru Kripalu University	Cuttack	No	2021	General	
NIST University	Ganjam	No	2023	Technology	
Silicon University	Bhubaneswar	No	2024	Technology	
Sri Sri University	Cuttack	Yes	2009	Humanities, social sciences	
Xavier University	Bhubaneswar	Yes	2013	Social sciences, management	

=== Punjab ===
There are 21 state private universities in Punjab, two of which were declared fit under Section 12 (B).

State private universities of Punjab
University	Location	Inspection report?	Established	Specialization	Sources
Adesh University	Bathinda	No	2012	Medicine	
Akal University	Talwandi Sabo	No	2015	General	
Amity University, Punjab	Mohali	No	2021	General	
CGC University, Mohali	Mohali	No	General	2025	
Chitkara University, Punjab	Rajpura	Yes	2010	General	
Chandigarh University	Gharuan	Yes	2012	General	
CT University, Punjab	Ludhiana	No	2017	General	
DAV University	Jalandhar	No	2013	General	
Desh Bhagat University	Mandi Gobindgarh	Yes	2012	General	
GNA University	Kapurthala	No	2014	General	
Guru Kashi University	Talwandi Sabo	No	2011	General	
Khalsa University	Amritsar	No	2016	General	
Lamrin Tech Skills University	Chandigarh	No	2021	Technology	
Lovely Professional University	Phagwara	Yes	2006	General	
Plaksha University	Mohali	No	2019	Technology	
Rayat Bahra Professional University, Hoshiarpur	Hoshiarpur	No	2016	General	
Rayat-Bahra University	Sahauran	No	2014	General	
RIMT University	Mandi Gobindgarh	No	2015	General	
Sant Baba Bhag Singh University	Jalandhar	No	2014	General	
Sri Guru Granth Sahib World University	Fatehgarh Sahib	Yes	2008	General	
Sri Guru Ram Das University of Health Sciences, Sri Amritsar	Sri Amritsar	No	2016	Medicine	

=== Rajasthan ===
There are 53 state private universities in Rajasthan, four of which were declared fit under Section 12 (B).

State private universities of Rajasthan
University	Location	Inspection report?	Established	Specialization	Sources
Amity University, Jaipur	Jaipur	Yes	2008	General	
Apex University	Jaipur	No	2018	General	
Bhagwant University	Ajmer	No	2008	Technology	
Bhupal Nobles University	Udaipur	No	2017	General	
Career Point University	Kota	No	2012	General	
Dr. K.N.Modi University	Newai	Yes	2010	Technology	
Geetanjali University	Udaipur	Yes	2011	Medicine	
Homoeopathy University	Jaipur	Yes	2010	Homoeopathy	
ICFAI University, Jaipur	Jaipur	Yes	2011	Management	
Indian Institute of Health Management Research	Jaipur	No	2014	Medicine	
JECRC University	Jaipur	Yes	2012	General	
Jagannath University	Jaipur	Yes	2008	General	
Jai Minesh Adivasi University	Kota	No	2022	General	
Jaipur National University	Jaipur	Yes	2007	General	
Jayoti Vidyapeeth Women's University	Jaipur	Yes	2008	Women's only	
Jodhpur National University	Jodhpur	Yes	2008	General	
JK Lakshmipat University	Jaipur	Yes	2011	Technology, management	
Lords University	Alwar	No	2018	General	
Madhav University	Sirohi	Yes	2014	General	
Maharaj Vinayak Global University	Jaipur	No	2012	General	
Maharishi Arvind University, Jaipur	Jaipur	No	2015	General	
Mahatma Gandhi University of Medical Sciences & Technology	Jaipur	Yes	2011	Medicine	
Mahatma Jyoti Rao Phoole University	Jaipur	No	2009	General	
Manipal University Jaipur	Jaipur	Yes	2011	General	
Maulana Azad University	Jodhpur	Yes	2014	General	
Mewar University	Chittorgarh	Yes	2008	General	
Mody University of Science and Technology	Laxmangarh	Yes	2013	Science and technology	
NIIT University	Neemrana	Yes	2010	Technology, management	
NIMS University	Jaipur	Yes	2008	General	
Nirwan University	Jaipur	No	2017	General	
OPJS University	Jhunjhunu	No	2018	General	
Pacific Academy of Higher Education & Research (PAHER)	Udaipur	Yes	2014	General	
Pacific University	Udaipur	Yes	2010	General	
Poornima University	Jaipur	Yes	2012	General	
Pratap University	Jaipur	Yes	2011	General	
Raffles University	Neemrana	No	2011	General	
RNB Global University	Bikaner	No	2015	General	
Raffles University	Neemrana	Yes	2011	General	
Sai Tirupati University	Udaipur	Yes	2016	General	
Sangam University	Bhilwara	Yes	2012	General	
Shri Jagdish Prasad Jhabarmal Tibrewala University	Jhunjhunu	No	2009	General	
Shri Kallaji Vedic Vishvavidyalaya	Chittorgarh	No	2018	General	
Shri Khushal Das University	Hanumangarh	No	2018	General	
Shridhar University	Pilani	Yes	2010	General	
Shyam University	Dausa	No	2018	General	
Singhania University	Jhunjhunu	No	2008	General	
Sir Padampat Singhania University	Udaipur	Yes	2008	Technology, management	
Sunrise University	Alwar	Yes	2011	General	
Suresh Gyan Vihar University	Jaipur	Yes	2008	General	
Tantia University	Hanumangarh	Yes	2013	General	
University of Engineering & Management, Jaipur	Jaipur	Yes	2012	General	
University of Technology, Jaipur	Jaipur	No	2017	Technology	
Vivekananda Global University	Jaipur	No	2012	General	

=== Sikkim ===
There are 26 state private universities in Sikkim.

State private universities of Sikkim
University	Location	Inspection report?	Established	Specialization	Sources
Atal Bihari Vajpayee Skill University	Gangtok	No	2025	General	
Capital University	Jorethang	No	2022	General	
Duke International University	South Sikkim	No	2025	General	
Fusion University	Soreng	No	2025	General	
Gurukul Vidyapeeth University	Namchi	No	2025	General	
Mahatma Gandhi University (MGU), Sikkim	Soreng	No	2022	General	
Management and Information Technology University	Namchi	No	2025	Technology	
Matrix SkillTech University	Geyzing	No	2025	Technology	
Medhavi Skills University	Sikkim	Yes	2021	General	
Orchid University	Mangan	No	2026	General	
Pannadhay University	Sikkim	No	2025	Geberal	
Sengol International University	Namchi	No	2025	General	
SRM University, Sikkim	Gangtok	Yes	2013	General	
Shri Rukmani Dwarkadhish University of Science and Technology	South Sikkim	No	2026	Technology	
Sikkim Alpine University	South Sikkim	No	2021	General	
Sikkim Global Technical University	Namchi	No	2023	Technology	
Sikkim International University	West Sikkim	No	2021	General	
Sikkim Professional University	Gangtok	Yes	2008	General	
Sikkim Manipal University	Gangtok	Yes	1995	General	
Sikkim Medical Science University	Namchi	No	2025	Medicine	
Sikkim Organic Agriculture University	Soreng	No	2025	General	
Sikkim Skill University	South Sikkim	No	2022	General	
Sikkim Sardar Patel University	South Sikkim	No	2025	General	
Sri Venkateshwara University	East Sikkim	No	2025	General	
The ICFAI University Sikkim	Gangtok	Yes	2004	Management	

=== Tamil Nadu ===
There are five state private universities in Tamil Nadu.

State private universities of Tamil Nadu
University	Location	Inspection report?	Established	Specialization	Sources
Dhanalakshmi Srinivasan University	Tiruchirapalli	No	2021	General	
Jeppiaar University	Chennai	No	2021	General	
Joy University	Tirunelveli	No	2022	General	
Sai University	Chennai	No	2021	General	
Shiv Nadar University, Chennai	Kalavakkam	No	2021	General	
Takshashila University	Tindivanam	No	2022	General	

=== Telangana ===
There are Ten state private universities in Telangana.

State private universities of Telangana
University	Location	Inspection report?	Established	Specialization	Sources
Anurag University	Hyderabad	No	2020	General	
Guru Nanak University	Hyderabad	No	2024	General	
Kaveri University	Siddipet	No	2024	General	
Mahindra University	Hyderabad	No	2020	General	
Malla Reddy University	Hyderabad	Yes	2020	General	
MNR University	Hyderabad	No	2024	General	
NICMAR University of Construction Studies	Hyderabad	No	2024	General	
SR University	Warangal	Yes	2020	General	
Sreenidhi University	Hyderabad	No	2024	General	
Woxsen University	Hyderabad	No	2020	General	

=== Tripura ===
There is Five state private university in Tripura.

State private universities of Tripura
University	Location	Inspection report?	Established	Specialization	Sources
Mata Tripura Sundari Open University	Gomati district	No	2024	General	
Techno India University	West Tripura	No	2023	Technology	
The Aryavart International University	North Tripura	No	2023	General	
Dhamma Dipa International Buddhist University	Sabroom	No	2022	Buddhism	
Institute of Chartered Financial Analysts of India University, Tripura	Agartala	Yes	2004	Management	

=== Uttar Pradesh ===
There are 47 state private universities in Uttar Pradesh, seven of which were declared fit under Section 12 (B).

State private universities of Uttar Pradesh
University	Location	Inspection report?	Established	Specialization	Sources
Agrawan Heritage University	Agra	No	2023	General	
Amity University, Noida	Noida	Yes	2005	General	
Babu Banarasi Das University	Lucknow	No	2010	General	
Bareilly International University	Bareilly	Yes	2016	General	
Bennett University	Greater Noida	Yes	2016	General	
Chandigarh University, Unnao	Unnao	No	2024	General	
Dr. K. N. Modi University	Ghaziabad	No	2025	General	
Era University	Lucknow	No	2016	General	
F.S. University	Shikohabad	No	2021	General	
Future University	Bareilly	No	2024	General	
G. S. University	Hapur	No	2024	General	
Galgotias University	Greater Noida	Yes	2011	General	
GLA University	Mathura	Yes	2010	Technology, management	
HRIT University	Ghaziabad	No	2024	General	
IFTM University	Moradabad	Yes	2010	Technology	
IILM University	Greater Noida	No	2022	General	
IIMT University	Meerut	No	2016	General	
Integral University	Lucknow	Yes	2004	Technology	
Invertis University	Bareilly	Yes	2010	Technology	
J.S. University	Shikohabad	No	2015	General	
Jaypee University	Anoopshahr	Yes	2014	General	
JSS University	Gautam Budh Nagar	No	2024	General	
K. D. University	Mathura	No	2025	General	
K.M. (Krishna Mohan) University	Mathura	No	2023	General	
Maharishi Mahesh Yogi Ramayan University	Ayodhya	No	2025	General	
Maharishi University of Information Technology	Lucknow	Yes	2014	Technology	
Mahaveer University	Meerut	No	2023	General	
Mahayogi Gorakhnath University	Gorakhpur	No	2021	General	
Major S. D. Singh University	Farrukhabad	No	2023	General	
Mangalayatan University	Aligarh	Yes	2006	General	
Mohammad Ali Jauhar University	Rampur	Yes	2006	General	
Monad University	Hapur	No	2010	General	
Noida International University	Greater Noida	Yes	2010	General	
Rama University	Kanpur	Yes	2014	General	
Radha Govind University	Sambhal	No	2025	General	
S. K. S. International University	Mathura	No	2024	General	
Sanskriti University	Mathura	No	2016	General	
Saroj International University	Lucknow	Yes	2024	General	
SDGI Global University	Ghaziabad	No	2023	General	
Sharda University	Greater Noida	Yes	2009	General	
Sharda University Agra	Agra	No	2024	General	
Shobhit University	Gangoh	No	2012	General	
Shri Ramswaroop Memorial University	Barabanki	Yes	2012	General	
Shri Venkateshwara University	Gajraula	No	2010	Technology	
Swami Vivekanand Subharti University	Meerut	Yes	2008	General	
T. S. Mishra University	Lucknow	No	2023	General	
Teerthanker Mahaveer University	Moradabad	Yes	2008	General	
The Glocal University	Saharanpur	No	2012	General	
United University	Prayagraj	No	2021	General	
Varun Arjun University	Shahjahanpur	No	2023	General	
Vidya University	Meerut	No	2024	General	
Vivek University	Bijnor	No	2024	General	

=== Uttarakhand ===
There are 27 state private universities in Uttarakhand, 12 of which was declared fit under Section 12 (B).

State private universities of Uttarakhand
University	Location	Inspection report?	Established	Specialization	Sources
Amrapali University	Haldwani	No	2024	General	
Bhagwant Global University	Kotdwar	No	2016	General	
DBS Global University	Dehradun	No	2024	General	
DIT University	Dehradun	Yes	2013	Technology	
Dev Bhoomi Uttarakhand University	Dehradun	No	2021	General	
Dev Sanskriti Vishwavidyalaya	Haridwar	Yes	2002	General	
Graphic Era Hill University	Dehradun	No	2011	General	
Haridwar University	Roorkee	Yes	2010	General	
ICFAI University	Dehradun	Yes	2003	General	
IMS Unison University	Dehradun	Yes	2013	Management	
Jigyasa University	Dehradun	Yes	2003	General	
Maharaja Agrasen Himalayan Garhwal University	Dhair Gaon	No	2016	General	
Maya Devi University	Dehradun	No	2024	General	
Mind Power University	Nanital	No	2024	General	
Motherhood University	Roorkee	Yes	2016	General	
Quantum University	Roorkee	Yes	2017	General	
Ras Bihari Bose Subharti University	Dehradun	No	2024	General	
Sardar Bhagwan Singh University	Dehradun	No	2018	General	
Shri Guru Ram Rai University	Dehradun	No	2018	General	
Shrimati Manjira Devi University	Uttarkashi	No	2024	General	
Sparsh Himalaya University	Dehradun	Yes	2024	General	
Surajmal University	Kichha	No	2021	General	
Swami Rama Himalayan University	Dehradun	No	2012	Medicine, technology	
COER University	Roorkee	No	2025	Technology	
University of Patanjali	Haridwar	Yes	2002	Yoga	
University of Petroleum and Energy Studies	Dehradun	Yes	2003	Energy	
Uttaranchal University	Dehradun	Yes	2013	General	

=== West Bengal ===
There are 11 state private universities in West Bengal.

State private universities of West Bengal
University	Location	Inspection report?	Established	Specialization	Sources
Techno India University	New Town, Kolkata	No	2012	Technology, management	
Adamas University	Barasat	No	2014	Technology, management	
JIS University	Agarpara	No	2014	Technology, management, medicine	
Brainware University	Barasat	No	2016	General	
Seacom Skills University	Birbhum	No	2014	Technology	
University of Engineering & Management (UEM), Kolkata	New Town, Kolkata	No	2014	Technology, management	
Neotia University	Sarisha	No	2015	General	
Amity University, Kolkata	New Town, Kolkata	No	2015	General	
St. Xavier's University, Kolkata	New Town, Kolkata	No	2017	Management, general	
Sister Nivedita University	New Town, Kolkata	No	2017	Technology, management	
Swami Vivekananda University, Barrackpore	Barrackpore	No	2019	General	

== See also ==
- List of autonomous higher education institutes in India
- List of universities in India
- List of central universities in India
- List of state universities in India
- List of deemed universities in India
- Institutes of National Importance
- List of schools in India
- University Grants Commission (India)
- Ministry of Education (India)
