= Saveetha Amaravati University =

Indian state private university

- సవేత అమరావతి విశ్వవిద్యాలయం
- Type: State Private University
- Established: 2018
- Affiliations: UGC
- Chancellor: N. M. Veeraiyan
- Vice-Chancellor: Ch. Bala Nageswara Rao
- Location: Vijayawada, Andhra Pradesh, India
- Website: saveethaamaravatiuniversity.org

Saveetha Amaravati University is a state private university located in Vijayawada, Andhra Pradesh, India. Established in 2018, (Note: According to University Grants Commission, though the institute's crest shows 2017.) it is the third private university to be established in Amaravati, following SRM University, Andhra Pradesh and VIT-AP University. The university offers undergraduate studies in health sciences.

== See also ==
- List of universities in India
- Universities and colleges in India
