= Assam Down Town University =

University in Assam, India

- Motto: "Encouraging Success"
- Type: State Private University
- Established: 2010 (16 years ago)
- Accreditation: NAAC; SGS–ISO 9001:2015
- Affiliations: UGC
- Chancellor: Dr. Narendra Nath Dutta
- Vice-Chancellor: Dr. Narayan Chandra Talukdar
- Students: 8000
- Location: Guwahati, Assam, India
- Colors: Blue, white, yellow
- Website: adtu.in

Assam Down Town University was established through the Assam Down Town University Act, 2010 in the state of Assam, India in 2010. The university is located in Panikhaiti, Guwahati, the capital of Assam. The campus is based out of a 42 acres campus overlooking the Brahmaputra River, only 12 km from the Assam State Secretariat, Dispur; the capital complex of the state of Assam.

The campus provides over 60+ courses and has a total of over 8000+ students from 10 Indian States as well as Nepal, Bhutan, Bangladesh and also from Nigeria. The university was established by the Down Town Charity Trust, which is promoted by Down Town Hospital Limited.

== History ==
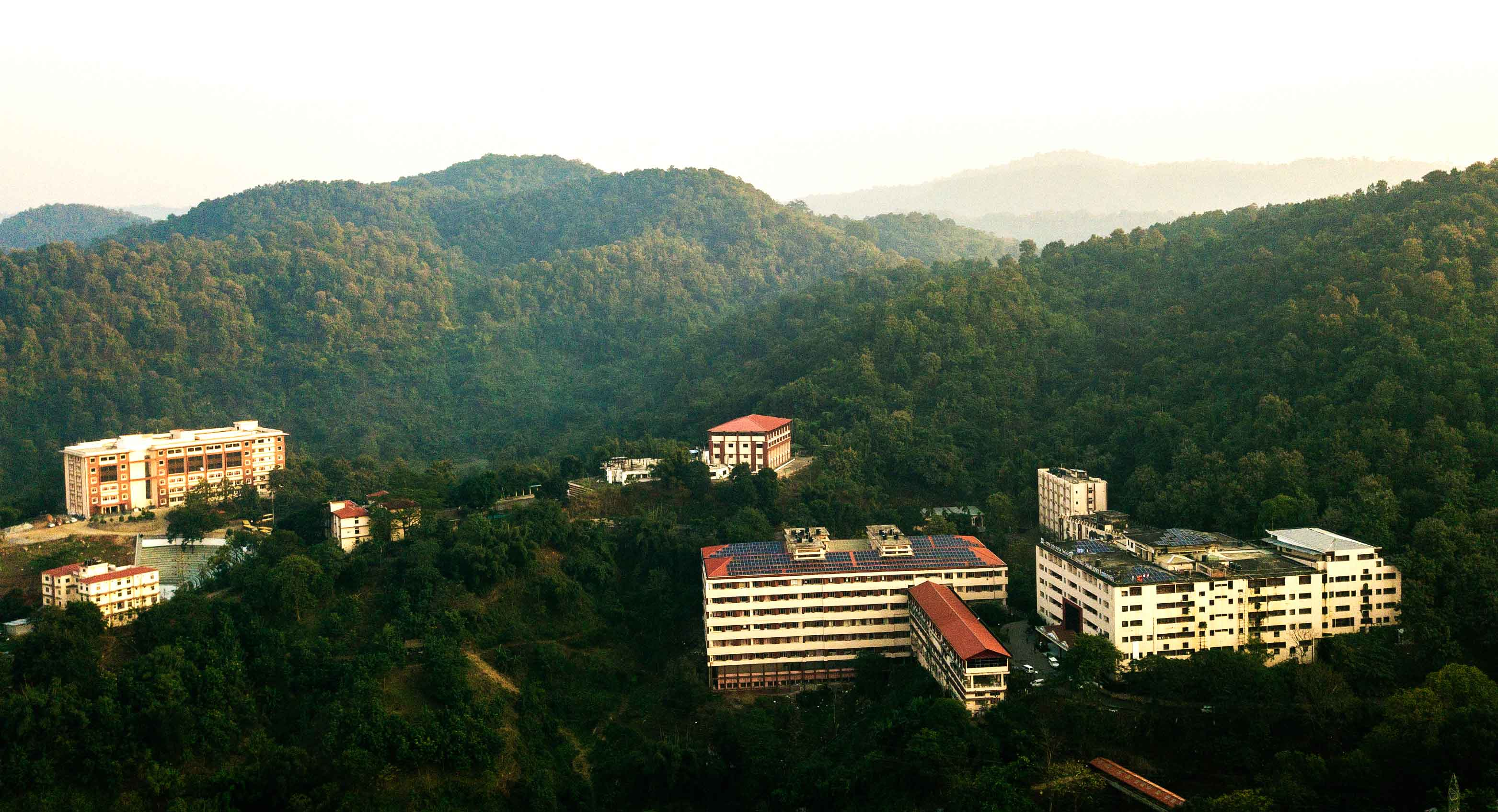
Assam Down Town University Campus at Panikhaiti, Guwahati, Assam.

The educational journey of the group had begun way back in 1993 with the establishment of the Down Town School of Nursing, the first private nursing school of North East. In 1997 the group started the paramedical institute, giving diplomas in various allied health streams.

Down Town Charity Trust had applied to the Assam Government for granting University status to its education programmes in Panikhaiti in early 2009. As per the provisions of the Assam Private Universities Act. 2007, the trust has successfully achieved a University Status for the educational project at its Panikhaiti Campus, vide Assam Gazette No.LGL.9/2010/11 Dated 29 April 2010, making it the second Private University in the state of Assam.

In 2009 the trust started the Down Town College of Allied Sciences, offering around 12 allied health degrees, under Srimanta Sankaradeva University of Health Sciences, Govt. of Assam.

== Campus ==
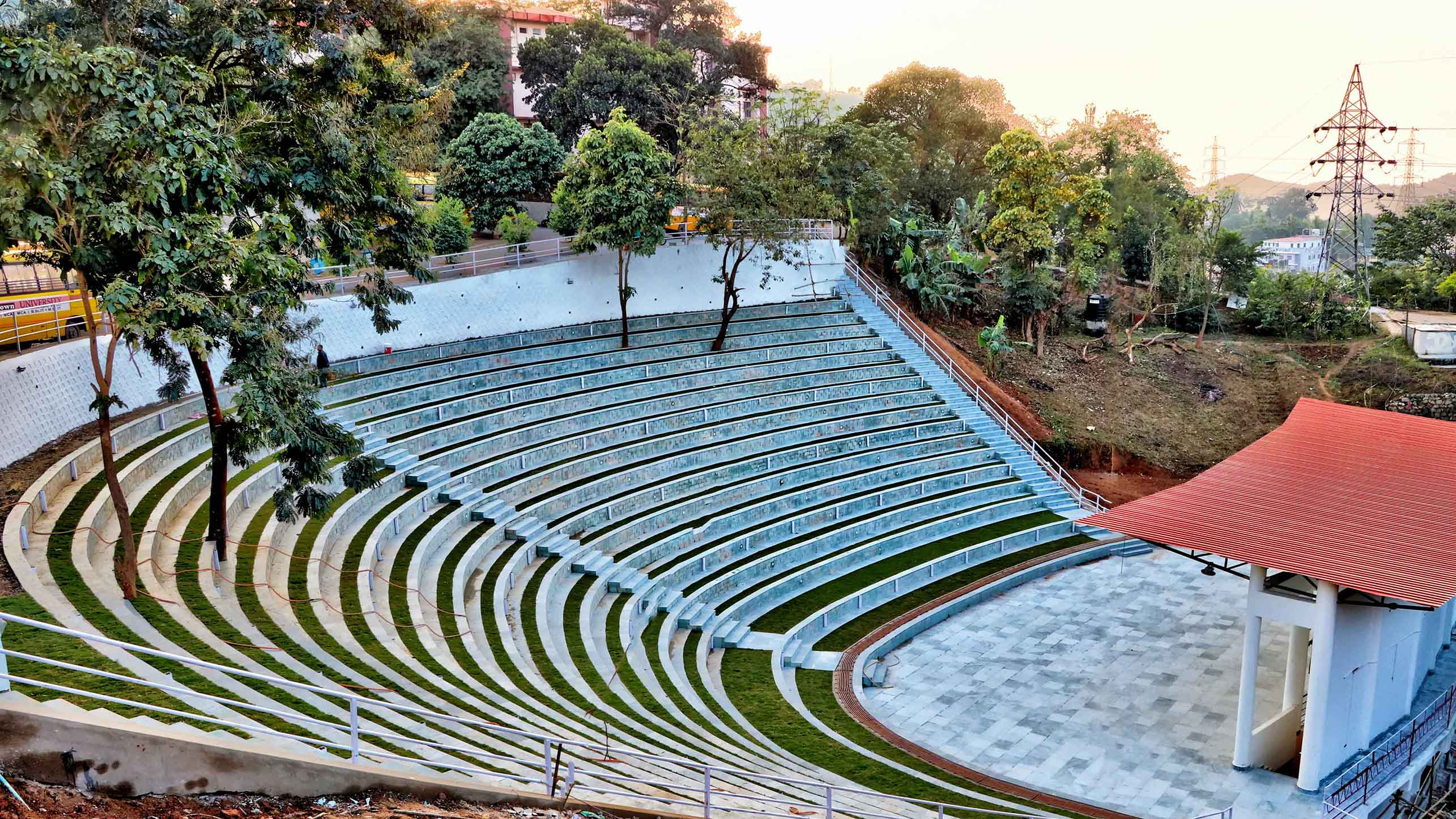
Assam Down Town University open amphitheater

The Assam Down Town University campus is located in Sankar Madhav Path, Gandhi Nagar, Panikhaiti, Guwahati, Assam India.

The university has two seminar rooms and one auditorium equipped with the latest audiovisual for meetings, fatuity presentations and discussions. The seating and its capacity of the Seminar rooms hall are 250 and 300 in Auditoriums. Conferences, seminars, workshops, guest lectures, cultural events are regular features at AdtU. The university also has a huge in-campus amphitheater.

== Organisation and administration ==
=== Governance ===
Dr. Narendra Nath Dutta is the Chancellor of Assam Down Town University. Dr. Narayan Chandra Talukdar is the Vice Chancellor of Assam Down Town University. Prof. Bandana Dutta is the Dean of Studies of Assam Down Town University.

=== Faculties ===
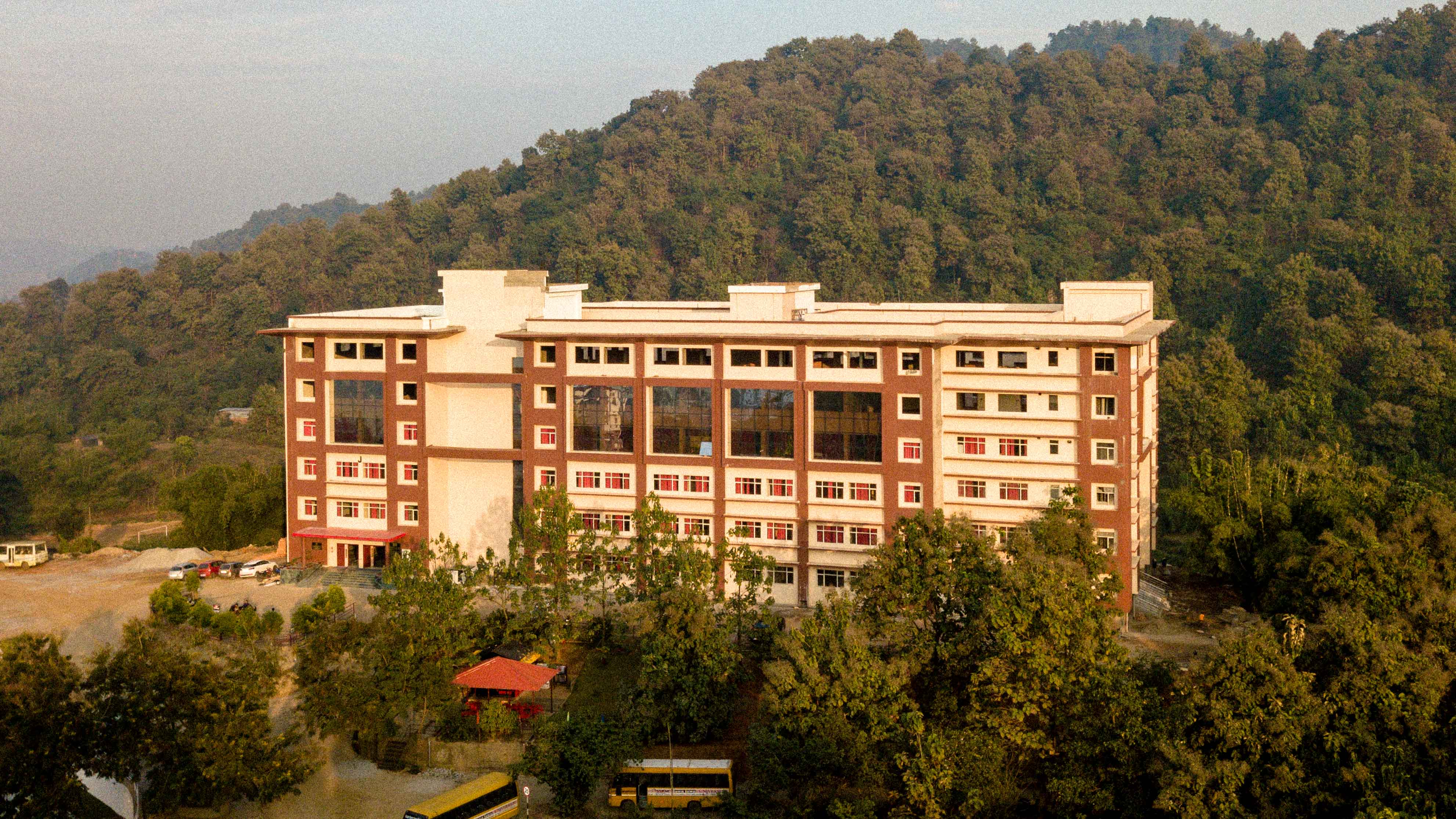
View of Faculty of Sciences, Assam Down Town University.

- Faculty of Paramedical Science
- Faculty of Science
- Faculty of Nursing
- Faculty of Humanities and Social Science
- Faculty of Commerce and Management
- Faculty of Pharmaceutical Science
- Faculty of Engineering & Technology
- Faculty of Agricultural Sciences

== Academics ==
=== Academic programmes ===
The university offers, multiple bachelor and master program, from engineering to hospitality to allied health sciences to Pharmacy.

It has signed a memorandum of understanding with the India Tourism Development Corporation (ITDC) to offer a degree course in hotel management and industrial training.

=== Recognition and approvals ===
Assam Down Town University is recognized by University Grants Commission (UGC) and approved by All India Council for Technical Education (AICTE), Assam Legislative Assembly, Pharmacy Council of India (PCI) and Indian Nursing Council (INC).

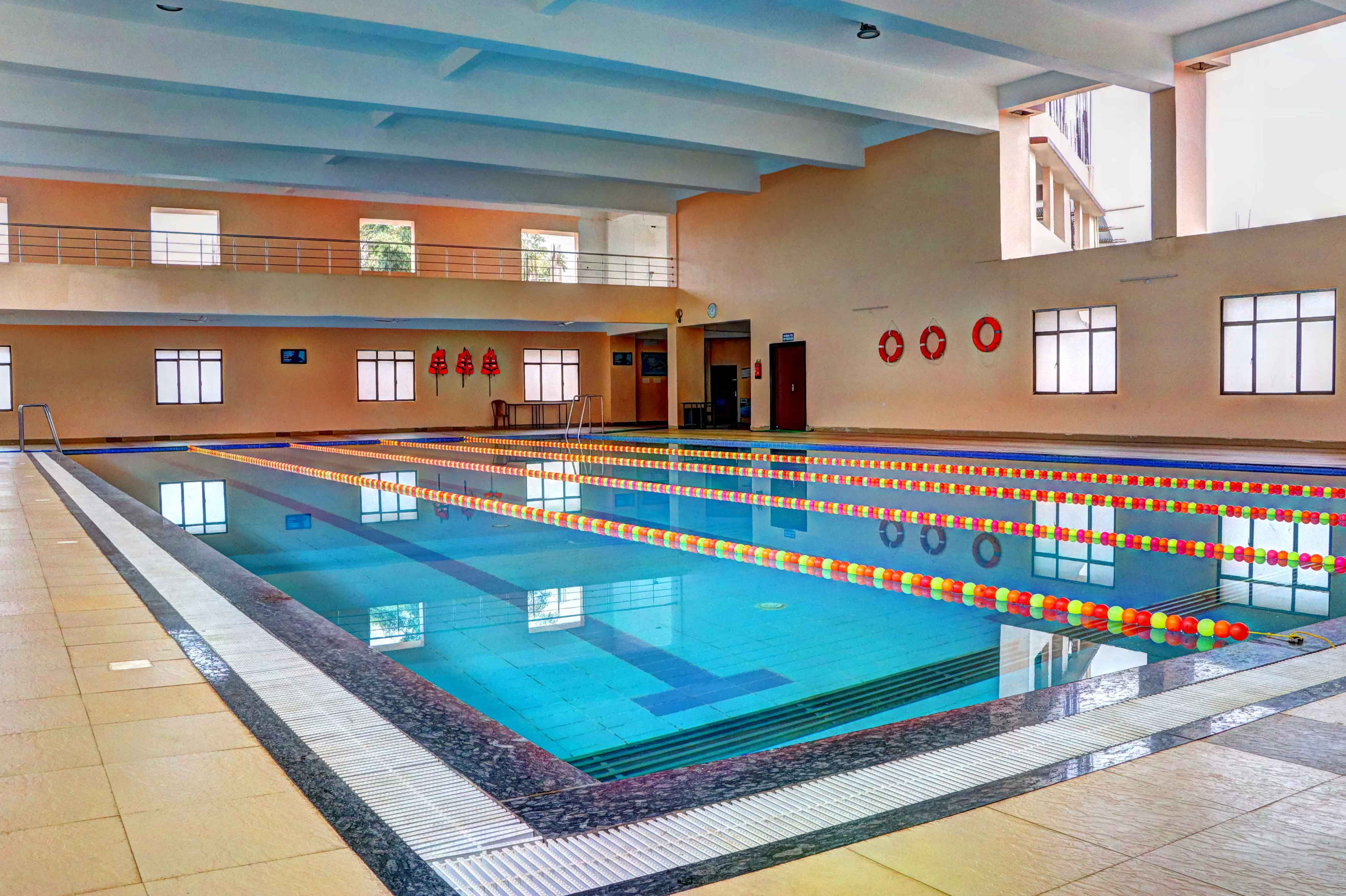
New Swimming Pool at Assam Down Town University

The university is maintaining the SIRO Certificate by Department of Scientific and Industrial Research (DSIR), Ministry of Science & Technology, Govt. of India.

=== Sports ===
The campus provides indoor and outdoor facilities for table tennis, pool, volleyball ground, badminton court, cricket ground, football ground, swimming pool, gym, etc. in the premises.

=== Online courses ===
Assam Downtown University offers online learning programs for students and teachers. It has signed an MOU with Coursera.
