= Lists of institutions of higher education in India =

370 engineering

Lists of institutions of Higher education in India include:

== Universities ==
- List of universities in India
- List of institutes funded by the government of India
- List of autonomous higher education institutes in India
- List of central universities in India
- List of state universities in India
- List of deemed universities in India
- List of private universities in India

== Academic institutions by states and union territories ==
=== North India ===
- Chandigarh
- Delhi
- Haryana
- Himachal Pradesh
- Jammu and Kashmir
- Punjab
- Rajasthan
- Uttar Pradesh
- Uttarakhand

=== South India ===
- Andhra Pradesh
- Karnataka
- Kerala
- Puducherry
- Tamil Nadu
- Telangana

=== East India ===
- Bihar
- Jharkhand
- Odisha
- West Bengal

=== West India ===
- Goa
- Gujarat
- Maharashtra

=== Central India ===
- Chhattisgarh
- Madhya Pradesh

=== Northeast India ===
- Arunachal Pradesh
- Assam
- Manipur
- Meghalaya
- Mizoram
- Nagaland
- Sikkim
- Tripura

=== Academic institutions by type ===
- Arts and Science Colleges
- Indian Institutes of Information Technology
- Indian Institutes of Technology
- Indian Institutes of Management
- National Forensic Sciences University
- National Institutes of Technology
- National Law University
- National Institute of Design (NIDs)
- Indian Institutes of Science Education and Research
- All India Institutes of Medical Sciences
- National Institutes of Pharmaceutical Education and Research
- Institute of Hotel Management
- Indian Institute of Tourism and Travel Management
- School of Planning and Architecture
- Agricultural institutions
- Ayurvedic colleges
- Business schools
- Drama schools
- Economics schools
- Islamic institutions
- Law schools

| class="col-break " |

- Medical colleges
- Aerospace Engineering schools
- Dental colleges
- Fashion schools
- Film schools
- Hospitality schools
- Architecture schools
- Journalism schools
- Maritime colleges
- Nursing schools
- Optometry schools
- Institutions of Music
- Pharmacy schools
- Veterinary medicine schools
- Library and information science

== Institutes of National Importance ==
In India, an Institution of National Importance (INI) refers to a premier public higher education institution granted special status by the constitution or an act of the Parliament of India. Such institutions are recognized for their pivotal role in developing highly skilled personnel within a specified region of the country or state. Institutes of National Importance enjoy special recognition, greater autonomy, and direct funding from the Government of India.

University / Affiliation	No. of Collages / Institutes
Schools of Planning and Architecture (SPA)	3
National Institutes of Design (NID)	5
Indian Institutes of Technology (IIT)	23 (2 more internationally)
National Institutes of Technology (NIT)	32
National Institutes of Food Technology Entrepreneurship and Management (NIFTEM)	2
Indian Institutes of Information Technology (IIIT)	25

== Miscellaneous lists ==
- Institutes of Eminence
- Institutes of National Importance
- List of Central Institutes in India
- List of oldest universities in continuous operation in India
- Women's universities and colleges

== See also ==
- Ministry of Human Resource Development of India (MHRD)
- Department of Higher Education of MHRD
- Open access in India
- Category:Universities and colleges in India
