= Kalinga University =

University in Chhattisgarh, India

- Motto: Knowledge creation for a vibrant and inclusive society.
- Type: State Private University
- Established: 2011
- Accreditation: UGC
- Affiliations: AICTE, AIU, BCI, INC, NCTE, PCI
- Academic affiliations: NAAC
- Chairman: Dr. Rajeev Kumar
- Chancellor: Dr. Sandeep Arora
- Vice-Chancellor: Dr. R. Shridhar
- Location: Naya Raipur, Chhattisgarh, India; 21.167°N 81.821°E
- Campus: Urban
- Website: kalingauniversity.ac.in

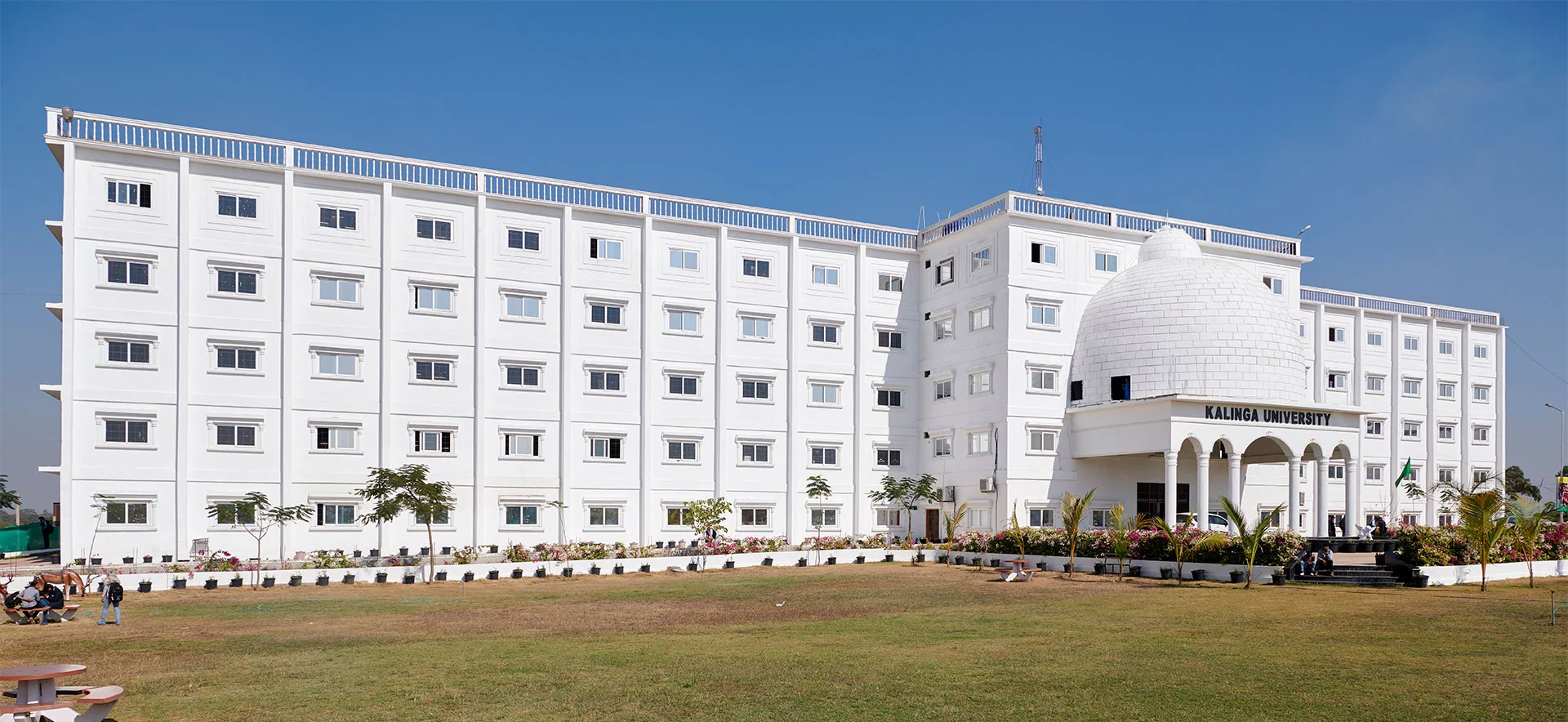
Kalinga University, Naya Raipur

Kalinga University is a state private university located in Naya Raipur, Chhattisgarh, India. It was established in the year 2011.

== Rankings ==
The university was ranked 751-800 in overall category by the NIRF (National Institutional Ranking Framework) in 2024.

University rankings

General – India
- NIRF (Overall) (2024): 151-200

== Academics ==
The university has following faculties:

- Faculty of Commerce and Management
- Faculty of Engineering and Technology
- Faculty of Information Technology
- Faculty of Science
- Faculty of Arts
- Faculty of Law
- Faculty of Pharmacy
- Faculty of system management
