= Sankalchand Patel University =

- Type: Private
- Established: 2016
- Affiliations: UGC
- President: Prakashbhai S. Patel
- Vice-Chancellor: Dr. Prafulkumar Udani
- Location: Visnagar, Gujarat, India
- Website: www.spu.ac.in

Sankalchand Patel University (SPU) is a private university located in Visnagar, Mehsana district, Gujarat, India. The university was established in 2016 by the Nootan Sarva Vidyalaya Kelvani Mandal through The Gujarat Private Universities (Amendment) Act, 2016 which also established Anant National University, Marwadi University and Plastindia International University.

== Constituent institutes ==
The university's constituent institutes include:

- Manish Institute of Management
- Narsinhbhai Patel Dental College and Hospital
- Nootan ayurvedic college and research centre
- Nootan homoeopathic medical college
- Nootan Medical College and Research Centre, Mehsana
- Nootan College of Nursing
- Nootan Pharmacy College
- Nootan College of Physiotherapy
- Nootan institute of design and communication
- Sankalchand Patel College of Engineering
- Smt. S. B. Patel Institute of Business Management
- Shri C. J. Patel College of Computer Studies
- Smt. S.S. Patel Nootan Science and Commerce College
- Swami Sachchidanand Polytechnic College
