= Centurion University of Technology and Management, Andhra Pradesh =

- Type: State Private University
- Established: 2017
- Affiliations: UGC
- Chancellor: G. S. N. Raju
- Vice-president: Dr. Dechiraju Narasimha Rao
- Vice-Chancellor: Dr. Prasanta Kumar Mohanty
- Location: Tekkali Village, Nellimarla Mandal, Vizianagaram , Andhra Pradesh, India; 17.891°N 83.299°E
- Website: cutmap.ac.in

Centurion University of Technology and Management, Andhra Pradesh (CUTM AP) is a state private university located at Tekkali Village in Nellimarla mandal, Vizianagaram district, Andhra Pradesh, India. The university was established in 2017 by the Centurion School of Rural Enterprise Management Trust (CSREM Trust) through the Andhra Pradesh Private Universities (Establishment and Regulation) Act, 2016. It offers various diploma, undergraduate and postgraduate courses, as well as a Ph.D. program. The university started operation in July 2017 from a temporary campus near Anandapuram and have a permanent campus near Vizianagaram in the future. It is a sister university of Centurion University of Technology and Management in Odisha.

== Academics ==
The institute offers diploma, undergraduate and postgraduate courses through three schools:

- School of Engineering and Technology
- School of Management
- School of Vocational Training

It also offers a Ph.D program and work integrated courses.
