= Career Point University =

University in Bhoraganj, India

- Type: Private
- Established: 2012
- Affiliations: UGC, BCI, PCI, AIU
- Chancellor: Pramod Maheshwari
- Vice-Chancellor: Sanjeev Sharma
- Location: Bhoranj, Himachal Pradesh, India; 31.622°N 76.623°E
- Website: www.cpuh.in

Career Point University (CPU) is a private university located near Bhoranj in Hamirpur district, Himachal Pradesh, India. The university was established in 2012 by the Gopi Bai Foundation Trust through the Career Point University (Establishment & Regulation) Act, 2012.

== Approval ==
CPU Hamirpur is recognised by the University Grants Commission (UGC), which has also sent an expert committee and accepted compliance of observation/deficiencies. The School of Legal Studies and Governance is approved by the Bar Council of India (BCI). The School of Pharmacy is approved by the Pharmacy Council of India (PCI). The university is also a member of the Association of Indian Universities (AIU).
