= Adamas University =

University in India

- Motto: Pursue Excellence
- Type: Private university
- Established: 2014
- Accreditation: NAAC
- Academic affiliations: UGC; AICTE; BCI; PCI
- Budget: ₹58.256 crore (US$6.0 million) (FY2021–22 est.)
- Chancellor: Dr. Samit Ray
- Vice-Chancellor: Suranjan Das
- Academic staff: 220 (2023)
- Students: 3,577 (2023)
- Undergraduates: 2,562 (2023)
- Postgraduates: 878 (2023)
- Doctoral students: 137 (2023)
- Location: Barasat, West Bengal, India; 22°44′18″N 88°27′24″E
- Campus: Rural, 100 acres (40 ha)
- Website: www.adamasuniversity.ac.in

Adamas University is a private university located on Barrackpore-Barasat road in Barasat, West Bengal, India. It has been established and incorporated by The Adamas University Act, 2014 (West Bengal Act IV of 2014) passed by the West Bengal Legislative Assembly. Adamas University is NAAC A credited and is recognized by the University Grants Commission, offering several undergraduate, postgraduate & doctoral degree courses in Engineering, Technology, Science, Agriculture, Pharmacy, Humanities, Law, Media and Management studies.

== See also ==
- List of institutions of higher education in West Bengal
- Education in India
- Education in West Bengal
