= Mata Gujri University =

Private university in Bihar, India

- Motto: योगः कर्मसु कौशलम्
- Motto in English: Yoga is skill in action
- Type: State Private University
- Established: 2019
- Affiliations: UGC, NMC, PCI, INC
- Chancellor: Sardar Balwant Singh Ramoowalia
- Vice-Chancellor: Dr. Prithwis Bhattacharyya
- Location: Kishanganj, Bihar, India
- Colors: Yellow
- Website: www.matagujriuniversity.com

Mata Gujri University is a state private university located in Kishanganj, Bihar, India. The university was established by the Mata Gujri Memorial Medical College & L.S.K. Hospital Trust, and like all private universities in Bihar, it operates under the Bihar Private Universities Act, 2013, through Gazette notification. It is the affiliating university of the Mata Gujri Memorial Medical College & Lions Seva Kendra Hospital, approved by the National Medical Commission (NMC). It is named after Mata Gujri.

== Constituent institutes ==
The college is composed of the following constituent institutes:

- Mata Gujri Memorial Medical College & Lions Seva Kendra Hospital (MGMMC & LSK Hospital)
- Mata Gujri College of Pharmacy
- Mata Gujri College of Nursing
- Mata Gujri G.N.M. Nursing School
