= List of institutions of higher education in Sikkim =

There is one Institute of National Importance, one central university, one state university and seven private universities offering courses in Indian state of Sikkim.

== Universities ==
=== Institutes of National Importance ===
University	Location	Type	Founded
National Institute of Technology Sikkim	Ravangla	Technical	2010

=== Central universities ===
University	Location	Type	Founded
Sikkim University	Gangtok	Public	2007

=== State universities ===
University	Location	Type	Founded
Khangchendzonga State University	Gangtok	Public	2018

=== Private universities ===
University	Location	Type	Founded
Sikkim Manipal University	5th Mile, Tadong, Gangtok	-	1994
ICFAI University, Sikkim	Gangtok	Technological and Management University	2004
Sikkim Professional University	Gangtok		2008
SRM University, Sikkim	Tadong, Gangtok	-	2013
Medhavi Skills University, Sikkim	Sikkim		2021
Sikkim Alpine University	Sikkim		2021
Management and Information Technology University	Melli, Namchi district	Private	2025
Duke International University	South Sikkim, Dist. Namchi, Sikkim 737126	Private	2025
