= Alpine University =

Alpine University may refer to:

- Alpine University, one of many fraudulent fictional universities used by Axact
- Alpine University, setting of Urban Legends: Final Cut

== See also ==
- Sikkim Alpine University, university in India
