= Shoolini University =

Private university in Himachal Pradesh, India

- Former names: Shoolini University of Biotechnology and Management Sciences
- Type: Private, not-for-profit
- Established: 2009
- Founders: Prof Prem Kumar (PK) Khosla and Prof Vishal Anand
- Accreditation: NAAC A+
- Affiliations: University Grants Commission (UGC); Pharmacy Council of India (PCI); Bar Council of India (BCI); National Board of Accreditation (NBA)
- Chancellor: Prof PK Khosla
- Vice-Chancellor: Prof Atul Khosla
- Students: 6,000+
- Location: Kasauli Hills, Solan, Himachal Pradesh, India – 173229; 30.8640°N 77.1180°E
- Campus: 25 acres
- Website: shooliniuniversity.com
- Location within Himachal Pradesh Location within India

Shoolini University of Biotechnology and Management Sciences. is a private university located in Solan, Himachal Pradesh, India and it is listed among the universities of Himachal Pradesh. It was established in 2009 under an Act of the Government of Himachal Pradesh. It is recognised by the University Grants Commission (UGC), accredited A+ by the National Assessment and Accreditation Council (NAAC) with a CGPA of 3.33, and holds Category-1 status under the UGC Graded Autonomy Regulations, 2018. It is also recognised by the Pharmacy Council of India (PCI) and the Bar Council of India (BCI).

In the QS World University Rankings 2026, Shoolini University is ranked 503rd globally and 11th in India. The Times Higher Education World University Rankings 2026 places it in the 401–500 band globally and 3rd in India. The National Institutional Ranking Framework (NIRF) 2025 ranked it 69th among universities in India.

== History ==
In 2004, the Foundation for Life Sciences and Business Management was established by professionals from academia and industry. In 2005, it set up the Shoolini Institute of Life Sciences and Business Management in Solan, affiliated with Himachal Pradesh University. In 2009, the institution became a full-fledged private university recognised by the UGC.

The first convocation was held on 11 April 2013, with Dr. APJ Abdul Kalam, former President of India, as the chief guest. The university received its first NAAC accreditation in 2016. In 2024, NAAC awarded it an A+ accreditation with a CGPA of 3.33. In July 2025, the UGC granted it Category-1 status during its 591st Commission Meeting.

== Rankings and Accreditations ==
In the QS World University Rankings 2026, Shoolini University is ranked 503rd globally and 11th in India. For Citations per Faculty, it is ranked 138th globally in the same edition. In the QS Asia University Rankings 2026, it is ranked 159th in Asia and 14th in India, and first in Asia for Citations per Paper. In the QS Sustainability Rankings 2026, it is ranked 522nd globally.

In the Times Higher Education World University Rankings 2026, it is placed in the 401–500 band globally and 3rd in India. For Research Quality THE ranks it 135th globally. In the THE Asia University Rankings 2026, it is ranked 4th in India. In the THE Impact Rankings 2025, it is ranked 96th globally, 38th for Climate Action (SDG 13), 21st for Affordable and Clean Energy (SDG 7), and 22nd for Clean Water and Sanitation (SDG 6).

The NIRF 2025 ranked it 69th among universities in India, 44th in Pharmaceutical Sciences, and in the 101–150 band in Engineering. In the Shanghai Ranking Global Ranking of Academic Subjects 2025, it is placed in the 201–300 band globally for Food Science and Technology and in the 301–400 band for Chemical Engineering.

Shoolini University is accredited A+ by NAAC with a CGPA of 3.33 and holds Category-1 status from the UGC. Its MBA program is accredited by the National Board of Accreditation (NBA). Commerce programs are ACCA-certified.

== Academics ==
Shoolini University offers undergraduate, postgraduate, and doctoral programs in Engineering. Biotechnology, Management, Commerce, Pharmacy, Law, Agriculture, Liberal Arts, and Journalism. Admissions are based on national entrance examinations including JEE Main, CUET, NEET, CAT, MAT, and SAT India, as well as the university's own entrance test, SU-SAT.

Online and distance learning programs including MBA, BBA, B Com (Hons), and BA are offered through the Centre for Distance and Online Education (SCDOE), approved by the UGC Distance Education Bureau.

== Research ==
Shoolini University's students and faculty have filed over 1,900 intellectual property registrations. As of December 2024, the university had attained an h-index of 140, the highest among institutions established in or after 2008 in India. In the QS Asia University Rankings 2026, the university is ranked first in Asia for Citations per Paper.

The university houses more than 104 laboratories and 11 Centres of Excellence. Research areas include biotechnology, cancer research, nanotechnology, omics and biodiversity, artificial intelligence, data analytics, energy science, and disaster management. A Bio-Innovation Centre was established with a ₹9 crore grant from the Department of Science and Technology under the DST-PURSE scheme, equipped for research in biotechnology, health sciences, and cell biology. The E-Yuva Centre, supported by the Biotechnology Industry Research Assistance Council (BIRAC), provides pre-incubation space and funding support for student-led research.

The university is a nodal remote centre for IIT Bombay and IIT Kharagpur. It houses an Amazon Web Services Academy Centre, an IBM Centre of Learning, and a Microsoft Academy, where students receive industry certifications.

== International Collaborations ==
Shoolini University has partnerships with more than 250 institutions across the United States, Australia, the United Kingdom, Italy, China, South Korea, and Taiwan. Partner institutions include the University of Melbourne, the University of Arkansas, Western Sydney University, Royal Holloway University of London, and Gachon University
