= Brainware University =

Private university in Kolkata, West Bengal, India

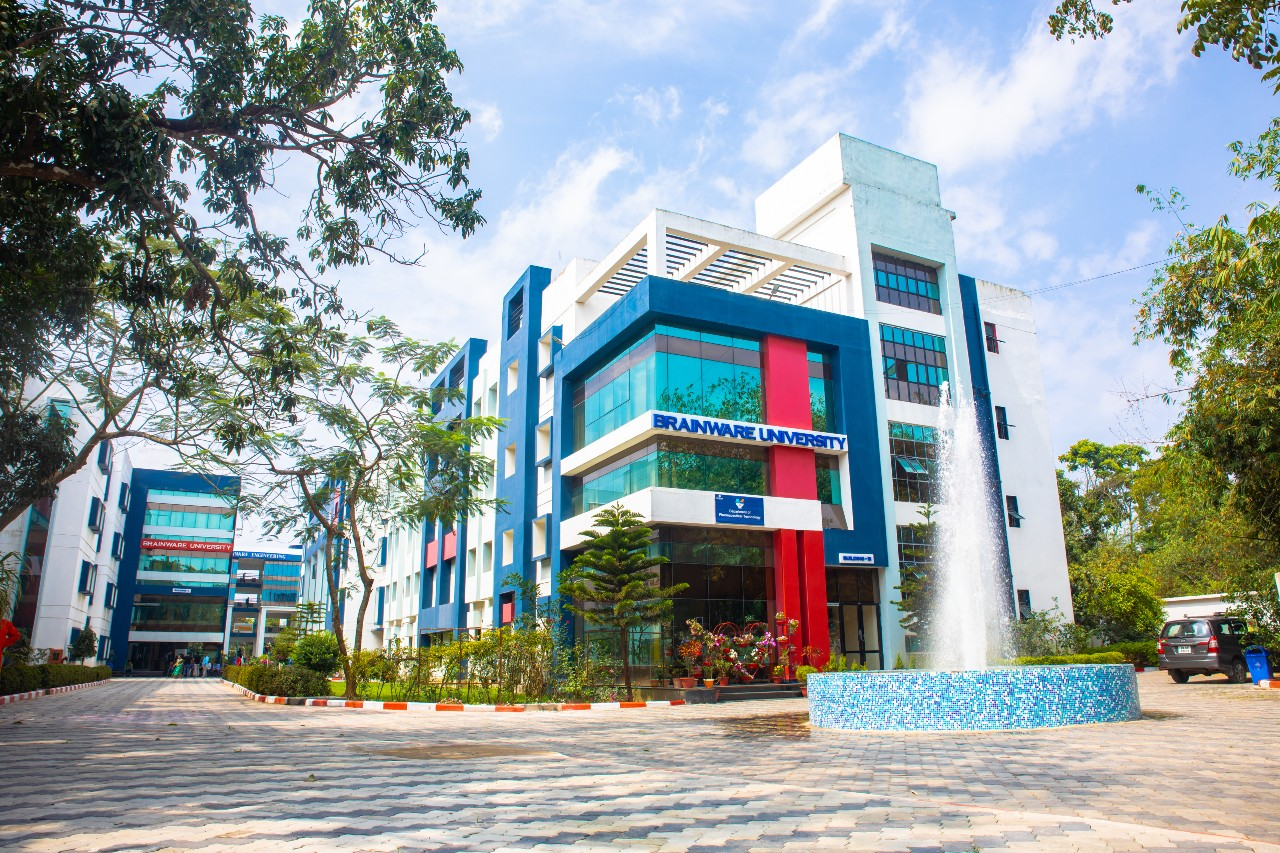
- Motto: We Make Careers
- Type: Private university
- Established: 2016; 10 years ago
- Academic affiliations: UGC; AIU; PCI; BCI; INC
- Chancellor: Phalguni Mookhopadhayay
- Vice-Chancellor: Sankar Gangopadhyay
- Academic staff: 376 (2023)
- Location: Barasat, West Bengal, India; 22°43′55″N 88°29′59″E
- Campus: Urban 9 acres (3.6 ha)
- Colours: Blue and Red
- Website: www.brainwareuniversity.ac.in

Brainware University is a private university located in Barasat, Kolkata, West Bengal, India. It was established on 25 February 2016. Brainware University, recognized by the University Grants Commission (UGC) is a state unitary university with the right to confer degrees as per Section 22(1) of the UGC Act, 1956.

== History ==
Brainware university offers on-campus Undergraduate, Postgraduate, Doctoral and Diploma programs. Brainware began as a private engineering college in West Bengal and became an IT education university. Eventually emerging as a private university on 25 February 2016 under the West Bengal Act XXXI of 2015 (more commonly referred to as Brainware University Act of 2015) passed by the West Bengal Legislature. It is part of the Brainware Group of Institutions.

== Approvals and recognitions ==
University Grants Commission, Association of Indian Universities, Ministry of Education, Indian Nursing Council, West Bengal Nursing Council, Department of Scientific & Industrial Research or the DSIR, Pharmacy Council of India, Ministry of MSME, Bar Council of India, Computer Society of India, Unnat Bharat Abhiyan, Institution Innovation Council.

== Campus, infrastructure & amenities ==
Brainware University is built on a 9-acre (3.6 ha) Barasat campus, located at Barasat Kazipara (Near Jagadighata Market).

The 9-acre campus is home to over 10000 students from across India.

Besides on-campus hostels, multisport arenas, clinics for mental healthcare, general healthcare, and physical fitness along with on-campus allied healthcare labs are available to the Brainware students.

== Governance ==
- Mr. Phalguni Mookhopadhayay is the Founder Chancellor
- Prof. Sankar Gangopadhyay holds the office of Vice Chancellor

== Academic programs ==
Currently, the university offers over 55 undergraduate, postgraduate degrees along with diploma and doctoral programs in the field of Management, Engineering, Computer Science, Media Science, Multimedia, Law, Commerce, Pharmacy, Biotechnology, Agriscience, Nutrition Science, Nursing, Allied Health Sciences, and Skill Development are taught through ten different schools.

- Brainware University Schools of Learning
- School of Engineering
- School of Biotechnology & Bioscience
- School of Agriculture
- School of Management
- School of Law
- School of Medical & Allied Health Science
- School of Communication, Multimedia & Film Studies
- School of Humanities & Social Sciences
- School of Skill Development

== Campus life ==
- Anandadhara is the annual fest of the university.
- Brainware's Got Talent is an annual event featuring on-stage talent performances, after which those of the top five finalists are uploaded on social media for audience polling.
- Creative Communion is an intercollege mega-event hosted in the campus.
- Texibition is the annual techfest for prototype model-building competitions, video gaming and coding competitions.
- Talent Clubs include Photography, Communication, Cinematography, Technology.

== Research ==
Brainware University has produced 418 research papers, published in peer-reviewed journals. 113 book chapters have been published. The university currently has 59 patents to its name. Brainwave: A Multidisciplinary Journal (ISSN 2582-659X) is the quarterly e-journal. It is a peer-reviewed open-access e-Journal.

== Rankings ==
Brainware University, located in West Bengal, India, has received recognition across multiple ranking platforms for its academic standards and research impact. According to UniRank, the university ranks among the notable institutions in India and is known for its focus on innovation and student support. In the Times Higher Education World University Rankings, Brainware University is acknowledged for its performance in research, teaching, and global outlook. The Ad Scientific Index provides a specialized evaluation, highlighting the university's H-Index and citation influence in various research fields. In the 2024 EPSI Ranking, Brainware University holds the 70th position within India's CLUB-100 category for multi-disciplinary universities. Edurank also lists the university favorably, affirming its commitment to education quality and academic growth within India.
