= Dancing Uncle =

Indian minor internet celebrity

- Born: Bhopal
- Known for: A viral video

Sanjeev Shrivastva, better known as Dancing Uncle, is an Indian professor and casual dancer who works at Bhabha University, Bhopal. In 2018, a video went viral in which he is seen dancing on a local song.
