= Kangchenjunga (disambiguation) =

Kangchenjunga is the third highest mountain in the world.

Kanchenjunga, Kanchenjungha, Kanchanjangha or Khangchendzonga may also refer to:

- Kanchenjungha (1962 film), a Bengali-language film by Satyajit Ray
- Kanchanjangha, a 2019 Assamese-language film by Zubeen Garg
- Kanchenjunga Conservation Area, a protected area in the Himalayas of eastern Nepal
- Kanchenjunga National Park, a National Park and a Biosphere reserve in Sikkim, India
- Khangchendzonga State University, government university in Sikkim, India
- Kanchanjungha Express, a passenger train in India
- Kanchenjunga, a mountain in Arthur Ransome's Swallows and Amazons series
- Kanchenjunga, the airliner which crashed on Mont Blanc on 24 January 1966 in Air India Flight 101

== See also ==
- Kanchana Ganga (disambiguation)
- Abar Kanchanjungha, a 2022 Indian film
