= Dilip Chandra Nath =

Indian academician and professor

Dilip Chandra Nath is an Indian academician and professor. He is a emeritus professor and honorary advisor at Royal Global University (officially established as The Assam Royal Global University, Guwahati). He previously served as the vice chancellor of Assam University, Silchar (a central University), India from 2016 to 2022. Before taking the position of a vice chancellor at Assam University, he was a professor of statistics at Gauhati University, India.

== Early life and education ==
He completed his bachelor's degree in 1972 from Gauhati University, and M.Sc in 1975 in Mathematical Statistics from Delhi University. He pursued PhD from Banaras Hindu University. He was a visiting scholar during 1991-93 at Duke University, USA and visiting Scientist during 1997-98 at the University of Washington, USA.
