= Assam Don Bosco University =

University in Assam, India

- Other name: ADBU
- Motto: Latin: Carpe Diem
- Motto in English: Seize the Day
- Type: Private state university
- Established: 2008; 18 years ago
- Founder: Salesians of Don Bosco
- Accreditation: NAAC
- Religious affiliation: Roman Catholic
- Academic affiliations: UGC; AICTE; DEC; AIU; ACU; IAU; PCI
- Endowment: INR 88.52 million (U.S $1.44 million)
- Chancellor: Fr. Sebastian Mathew, Salesians of Don Bosco
- Vice-Chancellor: Fr. (Dr.) Jose Palely, Salesians of Don Bosco
- Students: 2300+ (excluding online)
- Location: Guwahati and Sonapur, Assam, India; 26°11′14″N 91°41′30″E
- Campus: Urban
- Website: www.dbuniversity.ac.in

Assam Don Bosco University is a state private, non-profit, co-educational, Catholic research university located in Assam, India. The university was founded on 29 March 2008, by the Salesians of Don Bosco (SDB) and executed by the Don Bosco Society, Azara, Guwahati. The university was officially established through the Assam Don Bosco University Act, 2009, on 9 January 2009 and created under the Assam Private Universities Act 2007.

The university which is located in Guwahati, Assam, India is Assam's first state university in the private sector. The Governor of Assam serves as the Visitor. It is ranked by NIRF as the best private university in North East India. ADBU has been awarded the accreditation rating of "A Grade" by NAAC.

== History ==
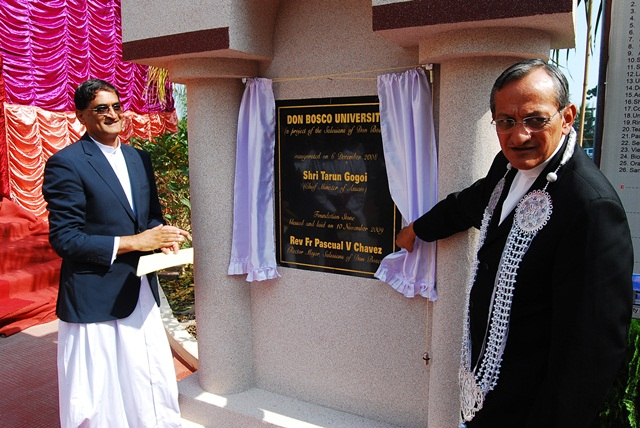
Fr. Pascual Chávez, Rector Major, Salesians of Don Bosco laying the Foundation Stone of the university

The university was set up as a response to the educational needs of the people of North-East India by an educational society -Salesians of Don Bosco. Ever since the establishment of St. Anthony's College at Shillong in 1934, the Salesians have set up and run higher educational institutions in North-East India.

- The first graduate courses in Technology and Engineering (BTech) was started at Azara on 11 August 2008;
- Assam State Government passed the 'Assam Don Bosco University Ordinance, 2008' on 3 December 2008;
- Formal inauguration of the university on 6 December 2008 by Assam State Chief Minister, Shri Tarun Gogoi;
- 'Assam Don Bosco University Act, 2009' was published in the Gazette of Assam on 12 February 2009;
- The university started its first post-graduate course in Computer Science (MCA) at Azara on 20 August 2009, followed on 27 August by the second postgraduate course in Management (MBA) at Don Bosco Institute of Management at Kharghuli.
- On 8 December 2010 the university began On-Line and Distance Education www.dbuglobal.com.
- The first batch of 33 graduates in Business Administration (MBA) was awarded their degrees on 9 June 2011.
- On 26 July 2011 the university inaugurated another course in Civil Engineering (BTech).
- 23 August 2011 saw the launch of two new postgraduate programmes: Social Work (MSW) and Technology (M Tech). 22 doctoral students started research in eight disciplines (Ph.D.) on the same day.
- The first Convocation of the university was held on 19 September 2012.

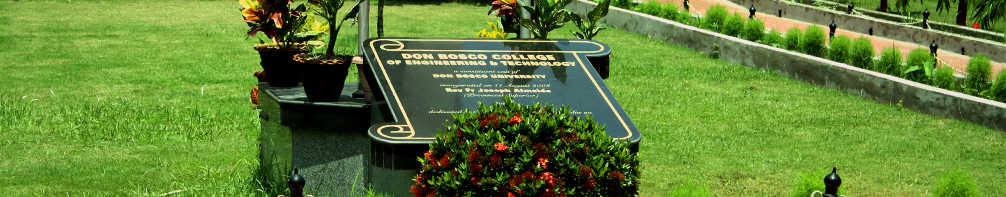

== Programmes and facilities ==
Assam Don Bosco University offers academic programmes in Engineering, Management, Social Sciences, Applied Sciences, Life Sciences, Research and Distance/Online Learning.

The first Constituent College of Don Bosco University is Don Bosco College of Engineering and Technology (DBCET) now known as ADBU Azara Campus.

The Central Library system runs on open sources software Koha and DSpace.

Community Engagements is strong feature of the university. To make community engagement an integral part of education, the university have introduced a mandatory course in Service Learning for all the students of the university. The course gives department specific theoretical input of 30 hours for all the students, followed by planned and supervised engagement by the students with communities (200 hours for UG students, 180 hours for PG students).

== Recognition, accreditation and ranking ==
The university is recognized by the University Grants Commission (UGC), India and accredited by the National Assessment and Accreditation Council (NAAC), India. The university is also approved by the Distance Education Bureau (DEB), India, All India Council for Technical Education (AICTE) and Pharmacy Council of India (PCI).

ADBU is a recognized member of the Association of Indian Universities (AIU), India, Association of Commonwealth Universities, (ACU), UK, International Association of Universities (IAU), France and Salesian Institutions of Higher Education (IUS).

Assam University was ranked 151-200 band in the university category by the National Institutional Ranking Framework (NIRF) in 2021.

== Partner universities ==
The university has established collaborative arrangements with universities and institutions in India and around the world through Memorandums of Understanding (MoU). The following are some of the partners of the university:

- Royal University of Bhutan - Bhutan
- Asian Institute of Technology – Thailand
- University of Chester – United Kingdom
- Fu Jen Catholic University - Taiwan
- Hebrew University of Jerusalem - Israel
- University College Dublin - Ireland
- University of Illinois Chicago - United States of America
- University of Arkansas at Little Rock – United States of America
- DeSales University – United States of America
- Barry University – United States of America
- University of Fribourg – Switzerland

== Awards ==
- Mental Health and Wellbeing (MHW) 2022 – Ranked in Gold Band – R World Institutional Ranking
- Times Higher Education Impact Ranking 2022 (#1 in Northeast India)
- Indian Institutional Ranking Framework (IIRF) 2022 (#1 in Assam)
- National Institutional Ranking Framework (NIRF) Ranking 202. Ministry of Education, Government of India (Only Pvt. University in Northeast India)
- Atal Ranking of Institutions on Innovation Achievements (ARIIA) Ministry of Education, Government of India
- Institution’s Innovation Council (IIC) – Ministry of Education, Government of India
- Asia Pacific Award 2020 – Most Engaged University of the Year
- FICCI University of the year – 0–10 years of existence
- DQ = CMR Dataquest – Top Pvt. University, North East India Zone
- Winner Smart India Hackathon 2019 – Ministry of Education, Government of India
- Times Higher Education World University Ranking 2020 – #46 and #53 in UN_SDG 15 and 6
