= Arunodaya University =

Indian private university

Coordinates: 27.117°N 93.714°E

- Type: State Private University
- Established: 2014
- Location: Itanagar, Arunachal Pradesh, India
- Website: arunodayauniversity.ac.in

Arunodaya University is a state private university located in Itanagar, Arunachal Pradesh, India.
