= Swami Vivekananda University, Barrackpore =

University in West Bengal, India

Swami Vivekananda University
- Motto: Excellence . Innovation . Entrepreneurship
- Type: Private
- Established: 2019
- Affiliations: UGC, BCI
- Vice-Chancellor: Subrata Dey
- Location: Barrackpore, North 24 Parganas district, West Bengal, 700121, India; 22.7595°N 88.3956°E
- Website: swamivivekanandauniversity.ac.in

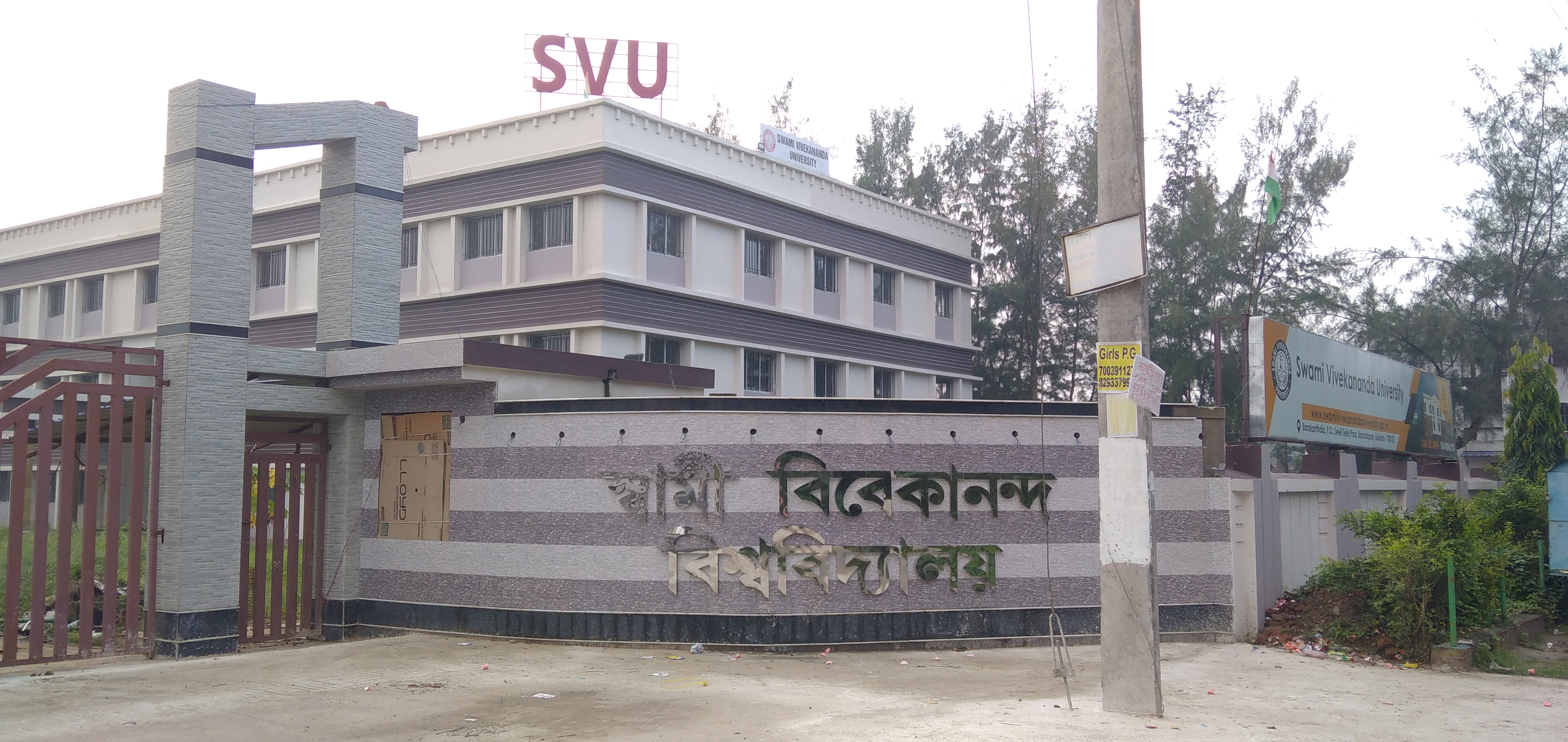
Swami Vivekananda University

Swami Vivekananda University is a private university in Barrackpore, North 24 Parganas district, West Bengal. Approved by the West Bengal Legislative Assembly in November 2019. The university established under the Swami Vivekananda University Act, 2019. The university is part of the state's efforts to enhance higher education infrastructure and opportunities.

== Academics ==
The university offers undergraduate, postgraduate degrees along with diploma in the field of Engineering, Computer Science, Life Science, Allied Health Science, Management, Humanities & Social Sciences and Agriculture are taught through different schools.

- School of Engineering
  - B.Tech & M.Tech courses in
    - Civil Engineering
    - Computer Science and Engineering
    - Electronics and Communication Engineering
    - Electrical Engineering
    - Mechanical Engineering
  - Dip.Eng. courses in
    - Computer Science and Technology
    - Civil Engineering
    - Electrical Engineering
    - Mechanical Engineering
- School of Computer Science
  - Bachelor of Computer Application
  - Bachelor of Science (Hons.) in Advanced Networking and Cyber Security
  - Bachelor of Science (Hons.) in Multimedia and Animation
  - Master of Computer Application
  - Masters of Science in Data Science
- School of Life Sciences
  - Bachelor of Science (Hons.) in Biotechnology
  - Bachelor of Science (Hons.) in Microbiology
  - Master of Science in Biotechnology
  - Master of Science in Microbiology
- School of Allied Health Sciences
  - Bachelor of Science (Hons.) in Psychology
  - Bachelor of Science (Hons.) in Clinical Nutrition and Dietetics
  - Bachelor of Physiotherapy
  - Bachelor of Optometry
  - Bachelor of Science in Medical Laboratory Technology
  - Bachelor of Science in Medical Radiology & Imaging Technology
  - Master of Science in Psychology
  - Master of Science in Food and Nutrition
- School of Management
  - Bachelor of Business Administration
  - Bachelor of Business Administration (Hospital Management)
  - Bachelor of Business Administration (Hotel Administration)
  - Master of Business Administration
  - Master of Hospital Administration
- School of Humanities & Social Sciences
  - Bachelor of Arts (Hons.) in English
  - Bachelor of Arts (Hons.) in Education
  - Bachelor of Arts (Hons.) in Journalism & Mass Communication
  - Master of Arts in English
  - Master of Arts in Education
  - Master of Arts in Journalism & Mass Communication
- School of Agriculture
  - Bachelor of Science (Hons.) in Agriculture
  - B.Tech in Agriculture Engineering
- School of Legal Studies
  - B.A. LL.B.(Hons.)
  - BBA LL.B.(Hons.)
  - LL.B (Hons.)

== See also ==
- List of universities in India
- University of Calcutta
- University of North Bengal
- Jadavpur University
- Vidyasagar University
- Jawaharlal Nehru University
- Jamia Millia Islamia
- Education in India
- Education in West Bengal
