= Kanchana Ganga =

Kanchana Ganga may refer to:

- Kanchana Ganga (1984 film), an Indian Telugu-language romantic drama film by V. Madhusudhan Rao
- Kanchana Ganga (2004 film), an Indian Kannada-language romantic drama film by Rajendra Singh Babu

== See also ==
- Kanchenjunga (disambiguation)
