= Abhilashi University =

University in Himachal Pradesh, India

- Type: Private
- Established: 2015
- Affiliations: UGC, CCIM, PCI, AIU
- Chancellor: Dr. R. K. Abhilashi
- Vice-Chancellor: H. K. Chaudhary
- Location: Chailchowk, Mandi, Himachal Pradesh, India; 31.5591°N 77.0095°E
- Website: www.abhilashiuniversity.ac.in

Abhilashi University (AU) is a private university located in Chailchowk, in Mandi district, Himachal Pradesh, India. The university was established in 2015 by the Abhilashi Educational Society through the Abhilashi University (Establishment and Regulation) Act, 2014.

== Faculties ==
The university comprises the following faculties:

- Faculty of Agriculture
- Faculty of Ayurveda
- Faculty of Engineering & Management
- Faculty of Pharmacy
- Faculty of Humanities, Education & Basic Science

== Approval ==
Like all universities in India, AU is recognised by the University Grants Commission (India) (UGC), which has also sent an expert committee and accepted compliance of observations and deficiencies. The Abhilashi Ayurvedic College and Research Institute is approved by the Central Council of Indian Medicine (CCIM).

The School of Pharmacy is approved by the Pharmacy Council of India (PCI).

The university is also a member of the Association of Indian Universities (AIU).
