= University of Technology, Jaipur =

Private university in Rajasthan, India

University of Technology
- Type: Private
- Established: 2017
- Chairperson: Dr. Anshu Surana
- Location: Jaipur, Rajasthan, India
- Website: universityoftechnology.edu.in

University of Technology is a private university located in Jaipur, Rajasthan, India. It was established after the Rajasthan's assembly passed the University of Technology, Jaipur Bill, Act No 28 of 2017.

== Recognitions ==
University of Technology is recognized by Government of Rajasthan, All India Council for Technical Education, Bar Council of India, Association of Indian Universities, University Grants Commission (UGC) New Delhi, Pharmacy Council of India and Rehabilitation Council of India.

It has a memorandum of understanding with the Institute of Chartered Accountants of India (ICAI) and Institute of Company Secretaries of India (ICSI).

University is Accredited with ISO 21001:2018 for Educational Organizations Management System by IAF.

As of 4 July 2025, a team from the National Assessment and Accreditation Council (NAAC), Bengaluru, conducted an official assessment and inspection at the University of Technology (UOT), Jaipur. Following the evaluation process, the university was awarded a B++ grade in recognition of its academic performance, infrastructure, and institutional processes.

== Vice Chancellors ==
Prof. Prabhat Kumar Sharma - February 2024 till date

== See also ==
- List of institutions of higher education in Rajasthan
