= Mahatma Gandhi University, Meghalaya =

Mahatma Gandhi University
- Motto: Education For All
- Type: Private University
- Established: 2011
- Affiliations: UGC; AICTE; AIU; PCI; BCI
- Chancellor: Rajan Chopra
- Vice-Chancellor: Dr. Sagar O. Manjare
- Location: Ri-Bhoi and Tura, Meghalaya, India; 24°4′0.7″N 91°52′11.39″E
- Campus: Urban (Khanpara, Tura)
- Website: www.mgu.edu.in

Mahatma Gandhi University is a private university located in Ri-Bhoi and Tura in Meghalaya, India.It was established by the Meghalaya State legislative Act, 2010. The Mahatma Gandhi University, informally known as MGU, is a State Private University located in Meghalaya, India. It was founded in 2011 by Meghalaya State legislative Act, 2010 (Meghalaya Act No.6 of 2011). MGU is empowered to award degrees as specified by the University Grants Commission (UGC) under section 22 of the UGC Act 1956.Consisting of two campuses, 23 faculties and almost 1500 students, the University provides 56 courses, distributed across Khanapara and Tura campuses.
