= Dhamma Dipa International Buddhist University =

- Type: Private
- Established: 2022
- Chancellor: Dr. Dhammapiya
- Vice-Chancellor: M. P. Narasimha Raju
- Location: Sabroom, Tripura
- Website: www.ddibu.in

Dhamma Dipa International Buddhist University (DDIBU) is a Private University. It is located in Sabroom in South Tripura. It was established in 2022.
