= Royal Global University =

Indian private university in Assam

- Type: State Private University
- Established: 2013 (13 years ago)
- Affiliations: UGC
- Chancellor: Dr. Ashok Kumar Pansari
- Vice-Chancellor: Dr. Alak Kumar Buragohain
- Location: Betkuchi, near CBI office Guwahati, Assam, India
- Campus: Urban
- Website: www.rgu.ac

Royal Global University (RGU), officially established as The Assam Royal Global University, is a state private university in Assam. The Assam Royal Global University, under the Umbrella of Royal Group of Institutions has been established by The Assam Royal Global University Bill, passed by the Assam Legislative Assembly and the same has been assented by the Honorable Governor of Assam. The Assam Royal Global University Act, 2013 has been notified by the Government in the Assam Gazette. It is located in Betkuchi, opposite to Balaji Temple, Guwahati. Dr. A. K. Pansari is the chancellor of Royal Global University, Prof. (Dr.) A. K. Buragohain is the vice-chancellor and A. K. Modi is the pro-chancellor. Royal Global University also has a Ph.D. Cell to act as the central hub for research activities across courses offered by the university.

== Academics ==
Royal Global University (RGU) with 13 institutions under it. The Royal Group of Institutions was established in 2009, offering courses in Engineering, Management, Architecture and Commerce. The schools under RGU are :

- Royal School of Applied and Pure Sciences (RSAPS)
- Royal School Of Architecture (RSA)
- Royal School Of Design (RSD)
- Royal School Of Behavioral & Allied Sciences (RSBAS)
- Royal School of Engineering & Technology (RSET)
- Royal School of Information Technology (RSIT)
- Royal School of Business (RSB)
- Royal School of Commerce (RSC)
- Royal School of Communication & Media (RSCOM)
- Royal School of Fashion Designing & Technology (RSFT)
- Royal School of Fine Arts (RSFA)
- Royal School of Information Technology (RSIT)
- Royal School of Language (RSL)
- Royal School of Law and Administration (RSLA)
- Royal School of Performing Arts (RSPA)
- Royal School of Humanities and Social Sciences (RSHSS)
- Royal School of Pharmacy (RSP)
