= Amity University, Raipur =

Private University in Raipur, India

- Motto: We Nurture Talent
- Type: State Private University
- Established: 2014
- Affiliations: UGC, BCI
- Chancellor: Dr. W. Selvamurthy
- Vice-Chancellor: Piyush Kant Pandey
- Location: Raipur, Chhattisgarh, India; 21.396°N 81.893°E
- Website: amity.edu/raipur/

Amity University, Raipur or Amity University Chhattisgarh is a state private university located in Raipur, Chhattisgarh, India. It was established in 2014 by Ritnand Balved Education Foundation (RBEF) as its Chhattisgarh campus.
