= Sikkim Professional University =

- Motto: An Abode of Knowledge
- Type: Private
- Established: 2008; 18 years ago
- Affiliations: UGC, INC, AIU, PCI
- Vice-Chancellor: Dr. H. S. Yadav
- Location: Gangtok, Sikkim, India
- Campus: Semi-Urban
- Colours: Blue and Orange
- Website: www.spu.ac

Sikkim Professional University, erstwhile Vinayaka Missions Sikkim University, Gangtok, Sikkim, India is a State Private University founded in the year 2008 under Sikkim Professional University Act, Sikkim (Act No. 11 of 2008) of Sikkim State Assembly. SPU is recognized by the University Grants Commission of India (UGC), The Indian Nursing Council (INC), and the Pharmacy Council of India (PCI). Formerly, the University was well known by Vinayaka Missions Sikkim University but now the name has been amended to Sikkim Professional University as per The Vinayaka Missions Sikkim University (Amendment) Act, 2020; (Act No 09 of 2020).

== Academics ==
Sikkim Professional University offers Under Graduate Degree Programme & Post Graduate Degree Programme in all major disciplines including Arts, Commerce and science.

- College of Arts and Social Science
- College of Engineering & Technology
- College of Business Management and Administrative Studies
- College of Computer and Information Technology
- College of Pharmaceutical and Paramedical Science
- College of Library & Information Science
- College of Nursing
- College of Agriculture
- College of Commerce
- College of Pharmaceutical & paramedical Science
- College of Hotel Management
- College of Physiotherapy
- College of Allied Health Study
