= Indian Institute of Health Management Research =

IIHMR University, Jaipur
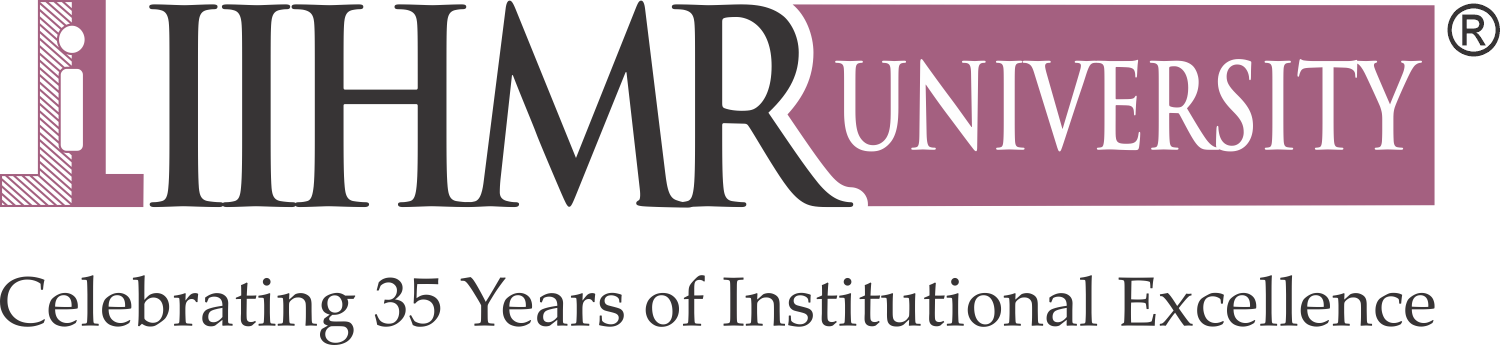
- Motto: A premier knowledge institution raising the bar in Sectoral Management Education, Research & Executive Education.
- Type: private
- Established: 1984; 42 years ago
- Founder: Dr. Ashok Agarwal
- Affiliations: UGC
- Chairperson: Sudarshan Jain
- President: Dr. P. R. Sodani
- Location: 1, Prabhu Dayal Marg, Near Sanganer Airport, Jaipur - 302029, Jaipur
- Campus: Fully Residential
- Website: www.iihmr.edu.in

IIHMR University in Jaipur, established in 1984 (then known as Indian Institute of Health management Research IIHMR), is a leading knowledge institution of the country engaged in research, teaching & training in the domain of Public Health, Hospital and Health Management, Pharmaceutical Management and Development Studies.

== History ==
The university finds its roots in the inception of The Indian Institute of Health Management Research (IIHMR), which was established to raise the standards of healthcare through research-backed best management practices. The sponsoring body was set up on 5 October 1984.

IIHMR institute submitted a proposal for the University under the guidelines for the establishment of government universities by separate Act. The University was instituted as postgraduate research University by Government of Rajasthan vide the IIHMR University Ordinance, 2013. It was later replaced by IIHMR University Act, 2014 (Act No. 3, of 2014), which got the nod from the Governor of Rajasthan.

== Faculty ==
IIHMR University, Jaipur has a faculty composed of academics and practitioners in the fields of public health, management, economics, statistics, demography, social and behavioral sciences, rural development, and pharmaceutical sector.

Dr. S. D. Gupta, MD, PhD, Epidemiology, Johns Hopkins is the Chairman of university. IIHMR University, Jaipur also has noted International faculty members in its ranks.

== Alumni ==
Its alumni include:

- Dr. Manvir Singh, COO International Business Operations and Medical Tourism, Health Care Division, Thumbay Group, UAE Thumbay Group of Hospitals, Dubai
- Nidhi Pundhir, Director, HCL Foundation
- Mahipal Singh Bhanot, Zonal Director (Fortis Hospital, Shalimar Bagh & Fortis Hospital, Vasant Kunj)
- Dr. Kapil Garg, Director Business Strategy & Intelligence, Paras Hospitals Group
- Sheenu Jhawar, Director Apex Hospitals Pvt. Ltd. and ACE Vision Health Consultants Pvt. Ltd
- Udayan Lahiry, Co-Founder and Group President, Medica Hospital
- Ravi Hirwani, Vice President Bagh - Bhai Lal Amin General Hospital, Vadodara
- Richa Singh Debgupta, Senior Vice President, Fortis Healthcare Ltd
- Onkar Shukla, AVP, Health & Wellness Products, Oman Insurance Company, UAE
- Dr. Mumtaz Hussain, General Manager Operations, Pentacare Medical Services L.L.C, Dubai
- Saurabh Gupta, Vice President Operations, Medanta Hospital, Lucknow
- Chiranjibi Panda, Practice Head, Risk and Compliance, Wipro Limited, Bengaluru

== Programs ==
In 1996, IIHMR University, Jaipur was the first institute in India to introduce post graduate program in hospital and health management. Today its three schools: Institute of Health Management Research, School of Pharmaceutical Management, and School of Development Studies, offer five programs that emphasize on cutting edge research and experiential learning.

== Ranking ==
- IIHMR University ranked 65th in the National Institutional Ranking Framework (NIRF) India Ranking 2020 announced by MHRD (Ministry of Human Resource Development), Government of India. In the same rankings in 2019, the university ranked 72nd.
- IIHMR University, Jaipur was the only private management Institute from Rajasthan to feature in The National Institutional Ranking Framework (NIRF) India Ranking 2020.
- Education World Private University Rankings 2020 -21 ranked IIHMR University, Jaipur at No. 11. It was the second ranked University in Rajasthan.

== Admissions ==
IIHMR University takes into account CAT/ XAT / NMAT / CMAT / ATMA / GMAT / GPAT (only for MBA in Pharmaceutical Management) scores for screening of admission applications. It also conducts its own IIHMR-U MAT entrance exam.

Selected candidates are invited for Group Discussion and Personal Interview rounds. The final selection for admissions is based on the proportional score of the entrance tests as well as GD and PI rounds.

== About Research ==
The institution has been involved in research in the healthcare sector for over four decades, handling over 800 research projects and studies in health policies and programs at National and International levels.

== Area of Research ==
Health systems, human resource and training, family welfare, maternal and child health, medical education, health management information system, evaluation, education and communication, information technology survey, project implementation plan, health economics and financing, drugs, strategy planning, HIV / AIDs, nutrition, communication behavior, national health policy, health insurance, quality assurance, reproductive health, gender health are just some of the areas of research undertaken by IIHMR University, Jaipur.

These studies and projects funded by bilateral agencies, state and Central Governments of India have had a significant impact. Evaluation of Global Fund in 16 countries enabled The Global Fund to re-strategize the prevention and control of malaria, tuberculosis, and HIV, especially in the developing countries. IIHMR University, Jaipur, also evaluated the National Leprosy Eradication Program in India and National Tuberculosis Control Program. Its study on Health Systems and Technical Support to the Ministry of Health, Islamic Republic of Afghanistan, helped boost the country's healthcare system.

== Centres ==
Over the years, IIHMR University, Jaipur has set up six centers of research. Center of Gender Studies, Center for Health Economics, Center for Health Systems and Policy Research, Center for Injury Research, Center for Innovation, Incubation and Entrepreneurship and Center for Wellness, Mindfulness and Ethics have produced research.

== Journal for Health Management ==
The peer-reviewed, interdisciplinary publication is dedicated to publishing articles of research in health policy, health management, health systems, program strategies, and related fields.
