= P P Savani University =

Private university in Dhamdod, Kosamba, Surat district, Gujarat, India

P. P. Savani University
- Type: Private
- Established: 2017
- President: Vallabhbhai Savani
- Provost: Dr. Parag Sanghani
- Location: Kosamba, Gujarat, India; 21.498244°N 73.008089°E
- Website: Official website

P. P. Savani University is a private university located in Dhamdod, Kosamba, Surat district, Gujarat, India. The university was established in 2017 through the Gujarat Private Universities (Amendment) Act, 2017, which was passed in March 2017 and also established Swarnim Startup & Innovation University, Karnavati University and Indrashil University. The university is accredited by NAAC C--. The first convocation was held in 2020.
