= Chhatrapati Shivaji Maharaj University =

Private university in Maharashtra, India

- Type: Private
- Established: 2018
- Location: Panvel, Navi Mumbai, Maharashtra, India
- Website: Official website

Chhatrapati Shivaji Maharaj University is a private University in Panvel, Navi Mumbai, Maharashtra, India, established under the Chhatrapati Shivaji Maharaj University Act, 2018. The university offers Degree, Diploma and Certificate programmes in various disciplines of Engineering, Architecture, Science, Life Science, Biotechnology, Pharmaceutical Science, Commerce, Management, Hospitality, Law, Liberal Arts, Humanities, Social Science, Education, Mass Media, Creative Arts, Film Studies and Fashion Technology etc.
