= Centurion University =

Private state university in Odisha, India

- Seal of Centurion University
- Former names: Jagannath Institute for Technology and Management (JITM)
- Motto in English: Connecting through knowledge
- Type: Private
- Established: 2010; 16 years ago
- Affiliations: UGC, AICTE, ICAR
- President: Dr. Mukti Kanta Mishra
- Vice-Chancellor: Supriya Pattanayak
- Location: Paralakhemundi and Jatni, Odisha, India; 18.806853°N 84.139883°E
- Campus: Rural
- Language: English
- Website: cutm.ac.in

Centurion University of Technology and Management (CUTM) is a private university in Odisha, India. With its main campus earlier at Parlakhemundi in Gajapati and another constituent campus located at Jatni, on the fringes of Bhubaneswar, which is now the main campus, was accorded the status of a university in 2010. The university has been accredited by NAAC with 'A+' Grade, thereby becoming the youngest private university to have earned the distinction. In 2016, the Bhubaneswar campus of the university was ranked 81 among the institutions offering engineering education in India by the Ministry of Education, Government of India under the NIRF.

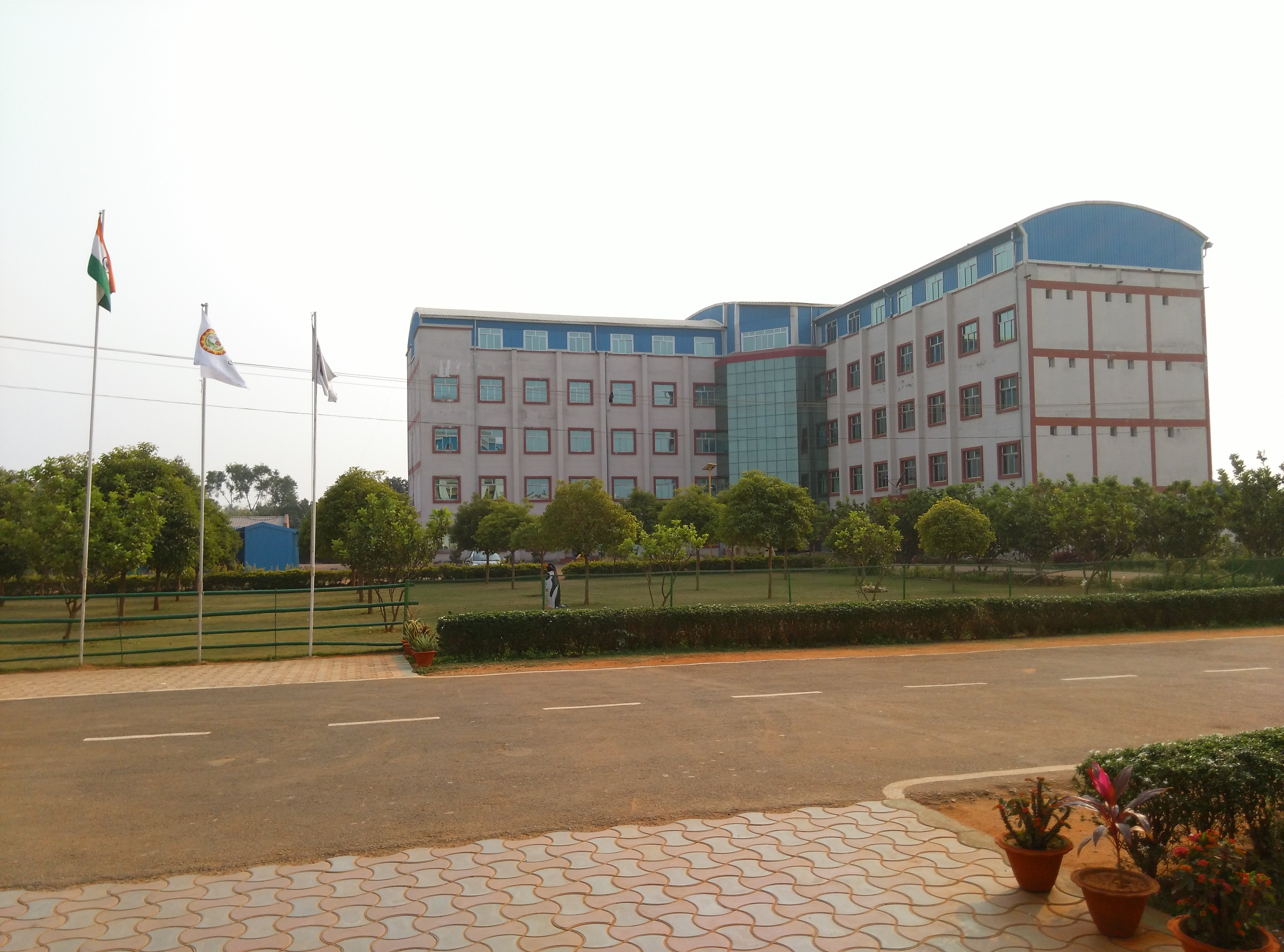
The Management Block of Centurion University Jatni Campus

The university offers under-graduate, post-graduate and doctoral courses in the fields of engineering and technology, agricultural sciences, architecture planning and design, mining, teachers' education, media and communication, paramedics and allied Health Sciences, pharmacy and life sciences, management, applied sciences and a number of vocational trades in its two major campuses. It also has regional campuses at Balangir, Rayagada, Balasore and Chhatrapur.

== History ==
The main campus of the university at Paralakhemundi was known previously as Jagannath Institute for Technology and Management (JITM), this was established in 1997. The institute was affiliated to Berhampur University, Berhampur till 2003 and Biju Patnaik University of Technology, Rourkela until 2010. The institute was taken over by a group of academics led by Dr. Mukti Kanta Mishra and Prof. D.N. Rao in the year 2005. In 2008, a second campus, Centurion Institute of Technology, was opened at Bhubaneswar. Subsequently, JITM was transformed into Centurion University of Technology and Management in August 2010, through an act of Odisha Legislative Assembly.

== Rankings ==
University rankings

General – India
- NIRF (Universities) (2024): 151-200

Engineering – India
- NIRF (2024): 201-300

The National Institutional Ranking Framework (NIRF) ranked the college in 201-300 band in the engineering rankings in 2024.
