= Indrashil University =

Private university in Mahesana district, Gujarat, India

- Type: Private
- Established: 2016
- President: Dr. Rajiv I. Modi
- Provost: Dr. Dharmesh J. Shah
- Location: Mahesana district, Gujarat, India; 23.332556°N 72.388036°E
- Website: Official website

Indrashil University is private university located in near the village Rajpur in Mahesana district, Gujarat, India.

== Establishment and legal framework ==
The university was established in 2017 through the Gujarat Private Universities (Amendment) Act, 2017, which also established P P Savani University, Karnavati University and Swarnim Startup & Innovation University.
