= Atmiya University =

Private university in Gujarat, India

- Type: Private
- Established: 2018
- President: Tyagvallabh Swami
- Vice-Chancellor: Rakesh Kumar Mudgal
- Location: Rajkot, Gujarat, India; 22.28239°N 70.767849°E
- Website: atmiyauni.ac.in
- Location within Gujarat Location within India

Atmiya University is a private university located in Rajkot, Gujarat, India. It was established in March 2018 by Sarvodaya Kelavni Samaj under Gujarat Private Universities (Second Amendment) Act, 2018, following the approval of the Bill earlier that month.

== Controversy ==
=== Financial irregularity allegations ===
In 2023, a criminal case was registered in Rajkot against Tyagvallabh Swami, president of the university, along with other secretaries and administrators of the Sarvodaya Kelavani Mandal (the trust that manages the university), following allegations of financial irregularities linked to the institution. According to the complaint, filed by a former associate, funds amounting to approximately ₹30–₹33 crore were allegedly misappropriated through fraudulent bank accounts. The accused were booked on charges including fraud and criminal conspiracy under the Indian Penal Code.

In June 2023, the Rajkot District and Sessions Court rejected Swami’s application seeking protection from arrest, allowing the investigation to continue. Later, in September 2024, the Gujarat High Court granted him anticipatory bail, restraining the police from taking coercive action during the pendency of the investigation.
