= Plastindia International University =

- Type: Private
- Established: 2016
- Affiliations: UGC
- President: M. P. Taparia
- Vice President: Dr. Raju Desai
- Location: Vapi, Gujarat, India
- Website: Official website

Plastindia International University is located in Dunga, Vapi, Gujarat, India. It is an industry specific university dedicated to plastics. It was founded in 2016 and is recognized by the University Grants Commission.
