= List of universities in India =

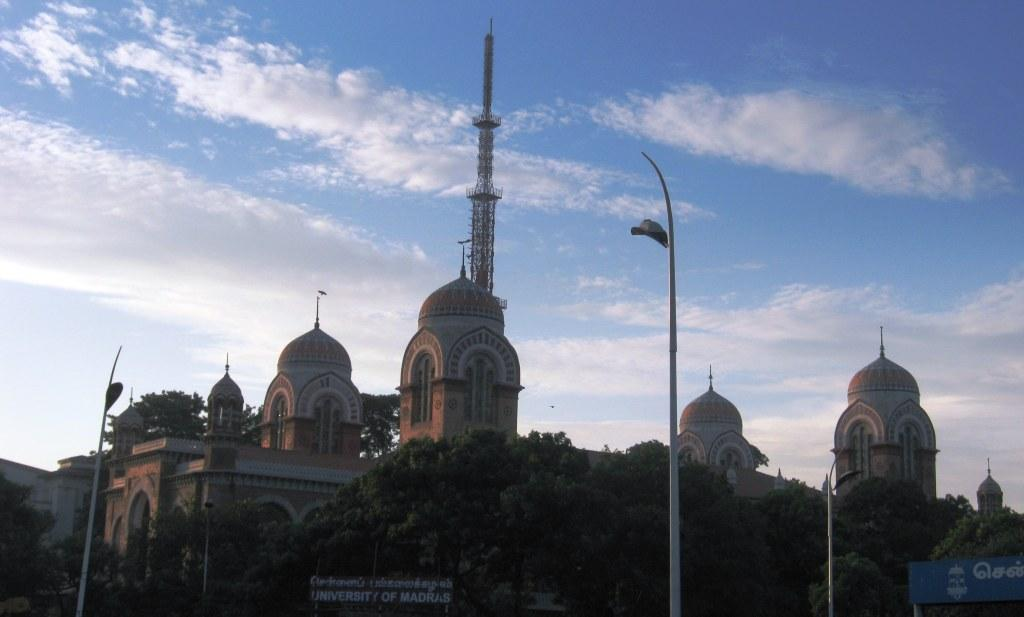
The University of Madras, established 1857, is one of the three oldest modern state universities in India, the others being the University of Calcutta and the University of Mumbai.

The higher education system in India includes both private and public universities. Public universities are supported by the Government of India and the state governments, while private universities are mostly supported by various bodies and societies. Universities in India are recognised by the University Grants Commission (UGC), which draws its power from the University Grants Commission Act, 1956. In addition, 15 Professional Councils are established, controlling different aspects of accreditation and co-ordination.

The types of universities include:

- Central universities, or Union universities, are established by an Act of Parliament and are under the purview of the Department of Higher Education in the Ministry of Education. As of 14 November 2023, the list of central universities published by the UGC includes 56 central universities.
- State universities are run by the state government of each of the States and union territories of India and are usually established by a local legislative assembly act. As of 14 November 2023, the UGC lists 479 active state universities. (Note: The list includes a serial numbering which goes up to 460. However, the list erroneously includes "U.P. King George's University of Dental Science" (#393) which was reabsorbed into King George's Medical University (#381) in 2007.) The oldest establishment date listed by the UGC is 1857, shared by the University of Calcutta, the University of Madras and the University of Mumbai. Most State Universities are affiliating universities administering many affiliated colleges (often located in small towns) that typically offer a range of undergraduate courses, but may also offer post-graduate courses. More established colleges may even offer PhD programs in some departments with the approval of the affiliating university.
- Deemed university, or "Deemed to be University", is a status of autonomy granted by the Department of Higher Education on the advice of the UGC, under Section 3 of the UGC Act. As of 14 November 2023, the UGC lists 124 institutes which were granted the deemed to be university status. According to this list, the first institute to be granted deemed university status was Indian Institute of Science, which was granted this status on 12 May 1958. In many cases, the same listing by the UGC covers several institutes. For example, the listing for Homi Bhabha National Institute covers the Institute of Mathematical Sciences, the Indira Gandhi Centre for Atomic Research and other institutes.
- Private universities are established by an Act of a State Legislative Assembly and approved by the UGC. As of 14 November 2023, the UGC consolidated list of universities lists 455 state private universities.

As of June 2025, the Press Information Bureau reports India has a total of 1,338 universities, reflecting growth since the previous UGC-published count in 2023. There are universities of some kind in each of the 28 states of India as well as five of the eight union territories: Chandigarh, Delhi, Jammu and Kashmir, Ladakh and Puducherry. The state with the most universities is Gujarat with 97 universities, and Gujarat has also by far the most state private universities, 63 in number. Tamil Nadu is the state with the most deemed universities, numbering 28, and Karnataka has the most state universities, 42. Delhi has 7 central universities, the largest number of all the states and territories.

- Institutes of National Importance Apart from the above universities, other institutions are granted the permission to autonomously award degrees. However, they do not affiliate colleges and are not officially called "universities" but "autonomous organizations" or "autonomous institutes". They fall under the administrative control of the Department of Higher Education. These organisations include the Indian Institutes of Information Technology, Indian Institutes of Technology, the National Institutes of Technology, the All India Institutes of Medical Sciences, the Indian Institutes of Science Education and Research, the Indian Institutes of Management and other autonomous institutes. These institutes are not listed below.

Also not listed are institutes which are under the control of the professional councils, without an approval of the UGC, e.g. Agricultural Universities, which are under the control of the Agricultural Education Division of the Indian Council of Agricultural Research (ICAR), one of the professional councils.

The University Grants Commission (UGC) has also maintains a list fake Universities operating in India. UGC has said that these 24 self-styled, unrecognised institutions functioning in contravention of the UGC Act have been declared as fake and are not entitled to confer any degrees. As of 14 November 2023, the list contains 20 institutions.

== Universities by state and type ==
The table below is up-to-date as of 14 November 2023.

State	Central universities	State universities	Deemed universities	Private universities	Total
Andhra Pradesh (list)	3	28	9	11	49
Arunachal Pradesh (list)	1	1	1	8	11
Assam (list)	2	18	1	9	30
Bihar (list)	4	20	1	7	32
Chandigarh (list)	0	1	1	0	2
Chhattisgarh (list)	1	16	0	16	33
Delhi (list)	7	11	9	0	27
Goa (list)	0	1	0	1	2
Gujarat (list)	2	30	2	63	97
Haryana (list)	1	20	5	25	51
Himachal Pradesh (list)	1	7	0	17	25
Jammu and Kashmir (list)	2	9	0	0	11
Jharkhand (list)	1	13	1	18	33
Karnataka (list)	1	42	14	25	82
Kerala (list)	1	15	3	0	19
Ladakh (list)	1	1	1	0	3
Madhya Pradesh (list)	2	24	1	51	78
Maharashtra (list)	1	29	21	26	77
Manipur (list)	3	3	0	5	11
Meghalaya (list)	1	0	0	9	10
Mizoram (list)	1	0	0	1	2
Nagaland (list)	1	0	0	4	5
Odisha (list)	1	23	3	8	35
Puducherry (list)	1	1	1	0	3
Punjab (list)	1	14	2	18	35
Rajasthan (list)	1	26	8	52	87
Sikkim (list)	1	2	0	8	11
Tamil Nadu (list)	2	22	28	4	56
Telangana (list)	3	17	4	5	29
Tripura (list)	1	2	0	1	4
Uttar Pradesh (list)	6	35	8	35	84
Uttarakhand (list)	1	12	3	22	38
West Bengal (list)	1	38	4	12	55
Total	56	478	124	455	1113

== See also ==
- Higher education in India
- List of think tanks in India
- List of schools in India
- Institutes of National Importance
- List of central universities in India
- List of deemed universities in India
- List of state private universities in India
- List of state universities in India
- List of Sanskrit universities in India
- List of Islamic universities and colleges in India
- List of institutes funded by the government of India
- List of autonomous higher education institutes in India
- List of Scientific organisations in India
- List of Research institutes in India
- Ancient institutions of learning in the Indian subcontinent
