= Anant National University =

Private university in Ahmedabad, Gujarat, India

- Type: Private
- Established: 2016; 10 years ago
- Affiliations: UGC, COA
- President: Ajay Piramal
- Provost: Dr. Sanjeev Vidyarthi
- Students: 495
- Undergraduates: 495
- Location: Ahmedabad, Gujarat, India; 23.027808°N 72.425989°E
- Website: anu.edu.in

Anant National University (AnantU or ANU) is a private university located in Ahmedabad, Gujarat, India. It was established in 2016 by the Laxman Gyanpith Trust through The Gujarat Private Universities (Amendment) Act, 2016. The University offers undergraduate and postgraduate programmes in design, architecture and built environment.

== History ==
The inception of Anant National University happened in 2011 when Anant Institute of Architecture, affiliated to Gujarat University, was established. In 2014, the Anant Institute of Planning was established, and was affiliated to Gujarat Technological University. In the next year 2015, the Anant Institute of Design was established in affiliation to Gujarat University.

Finally in 2016, it was granted the status of a private university, and Anant National University was established as India's first Design University.

== Academics ==
At the undergraduate level, the University offers a five-year, full-time Bachelor of Architecture programme, and a four-year, full-time Bachelor of Design programme with specialisations in space design, interaction design, product design, communication design, environmental design, fashion and textile design, and trans-disciplinary design. In 2017, AnantU launched a fellowship program for built environment, a one-year, full-time, post-graduate diploma programme. The University also offers two-year, full-time Master of Design programme with specialisations in integrated product design and urban design.

== Affiliation ==
Like all private universities in India, AnantU is recognised by the University Grants Commission (UGC). The Bachelor of Architecture programme is approved by the Council of Architecture (COA) for 88 seats.

== Ranking ==
The university was ranked 37th in India by the NIRF (National Institutional Ranking Framework) in the architecture ranking in 2024.

University rankings

Architecture – India
- NIRF (2024): 37

== Awards ==
Anant National University’s flagship programme, Anant Fellowship, was recognised for its innovative pedagogy and curriculum by ET Now at the 2018 Making Of Developed India (MODI) Awards.
