= Bhabha University =

Private university in Bhopal, Madhya Pradesh, India

Coordinates: 23.172°N 77.471°E

- Motto: Vision leads to desire, Desire leads to success
- Type: Private
- Established: 2018
- Founder: Sunil Kapoor
- Chancellor: Dr. Sadhna Kapoor
- Vice-Chancellor: Prof (Dr.) D K dey
- Location: Bhopal , madhya pradesh , India
- Colors: Blue & Yellow
- Website: bhabhauniversity.edu.in

Bhabha University is a private university in Bhopal, Madhya Pradesh, India. It was established in 2018 by the Ayushmati Education and Social Society.
