= Khangchendzonga State University =

Government university in Sikkim, India

- Motto: सा विद्या या विमुक्तये
- Type: State
- Established: 2018; 8 years ago
- Affiliations: UGC
- Chancellor: Governor of Sikkim
- Vice-Chancellor: Dr. Ashish Sharma
- Location: Tadong, Gangtok, Sikkim, 737102, India
- Website: https://ksus.ac.in/#/

Khangchendzonga State University is a new government state university in Gangtok, Sikkim, India. The university was established in 2018 as Sikkim State University under The Sikkim State University Act, 2003. In 2021, it was renamed as Khangchendzonga State University vide Act number 16 of 2021 passed by the Sikkim State Assembly. This university is actually named after Mount Khangchendzonga (also spelled as Kangchenjunga), highest mountain peak of the India. It offers postgraduate degree in Bhutia, Lepcha, Limboo, Nepali, and Sanskrit.
