= Assam Gazette =

Public journal of the Government of Assam

Assam Gazette অসম ৰাজপত্ৰ
- Type: Gazette
- Owner: Government of Assam
- Founder: Rana Pratap Baruah
- Publisher: Directorate of Printing and Stationery
- Founded: 1874
- Relaunched: 1954
- Language: English, Assamese
- Headquarters: Guwahati
- Website: dpns.assam.gov.in/portlets/publication-of-assam-gazettes

The Assam Gazette is a public journal of the Government of Assam published weekly by the Department of Stationery and Printing. As a public journal, the Gazette prints official notices from the government. The gazette is printed by the Government of Assam Press.

The book Assam Gazette The Assam Gazette was first published in the year 1874. 1st to 9th issue of the Gazette was printed in Christian Missionary Press of Cherrapunjee. The 10th issue of the Assam Gazette was printed in Assam Secretariat Press at Shillong on 23 May in the year 1874.

== History ==
Department of Printing and Stationery, Assam is situated at Bamunimaidam, Guwahati-21. Printing Press of Assam Govt. was established in the year of 1874 in the month of August at "Betten Hill" in Shillong. Initially the press was known as "Assam Secretariat Press". In the year of 1892 it is being changed to "Assam Secretariat Printing Department". Again in the year of 1921 name had been changed to "Assam Govt. Press". Which remained same till to-day.

In the year of 1954 the Government of Assam had taken a Cabinet Decision to start one Branch Press of Assam Govt. Press at Guwahati to do the Printing works of Gauhati High Court. According by as per Cabinet Decision in the year of 1954 on 14 November a branch of Assam Govt. Press was established at Guwahati in the campus of Guwahati Jail. After two years press had been shifted to a rented house at Rehabari, Guwahati. In that year the Stationery wings of the Department was incorporated.

Present Building of the Directorate of Printing and Stationery was completed in the year 1961 at Bamunimaidam, Guwahati-21 and it was inaugurated by the then Hon’ble Minister of Assam Late Rupnath Brahma, on 16 November 1961.

The First Director of the Directorate of Printing and Stationery was Late Rana Pratap Baruah (B.Sc., Printing Tech.). Directorate of Printing & Stationery is responsible for printing and publishing of the Assam Gazette. The Assam Gazette is published every Wednesday of the week.

== Gazette publication ==
Gazette Publication

1. Weekly Main Gazette every Wednesday. (Part-I, Part-II A, Part-II B, Part-IX, ADC, Supplement etc.)

2. Extra-Ordinary Gazette(Urgent, Semi-Urgent and Most Urgent). 3. Extra-Ordinary Gazette(RLA).

== Branches ==
Assam Govt. Branch Press (Mini Press) at Dispur, Guwahati-6.

Assam Govt. Branch Press, Jorhat.

Assam Govt. Branch Press, Lakhimpur (under Construction).

== Printing work and Procedures ==
In case of urgent and immediate nature of printing works and if Assam Govt. press is preoccupied with other urgent works, the concerned Department can get the work done by inviting tenders from eligible registered presses, subject to issuance of NOC from Directorate of Printing & Stationery.

== Persons ==
Minister of Printing and Stationery is Chief Minister of Assam. Key officials are Director and Deputy director of Directorate of Printing and Stationery, Government of Assam.

== See also ==
- Gazette
- The Gazette of India
- Constitution of India
