= Bhoranj =

- Town
- Location within Himachal Pradesh Location within India
- Coordinates: 31.644°N 76.642°E
- Country: India
- State: Himachal Pradesh
- District: Hamirpur

Government
  - Body: Panchayat

Languages
  - Official: Hindi
  - Native: Pahari
- Time zone: UTC+5:30 (IST)
- PIN: 176045
- Telephone code: 01972
- Vehicle registration: HP-74
- Nearest cities: Hamirpur, Una, Mandi
- Lok Sabha constituency: Hamirpur
- Civic agency: Panchayat
- Climate: Normal temperature . (Köppen)
- Avg. summer temperature: 38 °C (100 °F)
- Avg. winter temperature: 2 °C (36 °F)

Bhoranj is a tehsil headquarter in the Hamirpur district of Himachal Pradesh, located in northern India. One can reach Bhoranj by train up to Una (UHL) then by NH 503A and MDR 35 road, nearest airports are Bhuntar Airport (IATA: UAA) and Gaggal Airport (IATA: DHM, ICAO: VIGG).

== History ==
In 1806, following the Second Battle of Mahal Morian, the Gurkha Kingdom seized control of the region, formerly known as Mahal Morian Jagir in Katoch Kingdom. It had been a place where Raja Sansar Chand Katoch stored his treasures and imprisoned exiled kings. In 1809, Sikh Kingdom awarded the jagir to the Katoch clan, but after First Anglo-Sikh War in 1846, it was confiscated by the British and amalgamated in Punjab Hill States. Post-independence, Hamirpur remained part of Punjab until 1 November 1966, when it was merged into Himachal Pradesh. On 1 September 1972, Hamirpur was established as a separate district. Subsequently, in 1980, Bhoranj was created as a tehsil, and by the 1991 census, it was recognized as a full tehsil.

== Language ==
The people of Bhoranj speak Pahari (Hamirpuri), which has lots of similarities with Kahluri and Mandeali.

== Demographics ==
The total population of the Bhoranj tehsil is 81,986 – 38,456 males and 43,530 females.

== Climate ==
The average temperature in the summer is between 15 and 31 °C. During the winter, temperatures can drop as low as 2 °C in the winter and go as high as 38 °C in the summer. Monsoon season starts in July. By October, nights and mornings are very cold. Snowfall at elevations of nearly 3,000 m is about 3 m and persists from early December to late March. At about 4,500 m the snow lasts year round.
