= Sikkim Alpine University =

State Private university at Namchi, Sikkim, India

- Type: Private
- Established: 2021
- Chancellor: Shri Arjinder Bansal
- Vice-Chancellor: Prof. Sushil Kumar Tiwari
- Location: Namchi, Sikkim, 737126, India
- Website: https://sikkimalpineuniversity.edu.in/

Sikkim Alpine University, established in 2021, is a new private university at Namchi, Sikkim, India. It is a State Private University established by the State Legislature of Government of Sikkim by Act 4 of 2006 & further amended with Act 14 of 2021.
