= Pharmacy Council of India =

Statutory medical body

- Abbreviation: PCI
- Formation: 4 March 1948; 78 years ago
- Type: Government
- Legal status: Active
- Purpose: Regulation of the profession and practise of pharmacy
- Headquarters: New Delhi, India
- President: Montubhai Patel
- Vice president: Pramod G. Yeole
- Website: pci.nic.in (old site) pci.gov.in (new site)

The Pharmacy Council of India (PCI) is the statutory body under the Ministry of Health and Family Welfare, Government of India. It is constituted under the Pharmacy Act of 1948. The council was first constituted on 4 March 1948. Montubhai Patel was elected as the new president of PCI in May 2022.

== Members ==
The Pharmacy Council of India is constituted by the central government every five years. There are three types of members that collectively form the frame of PCI:

1. Elected members: One member is elected by the Medical Council of India (MCI) and one as a "registered pharmacist" by the state council.
2. Nominated members: Six members are nominated by the central government.
3. Ex-officio members:

1) The Director General, Health Service, Ex-officio.

2) The Drug Controller Of India.

3) The Director Of Central Drug Laboratory.

== Objectives ==
The objectives of the PCI are:

- To regulate the pharmacy education in the Country.
- To allow the registration as a pharmacist under the pharmacy act.
- To regulate the profession and practice of pharmacy.

== Main functions of PCI ==
The main functions of the PCI are:

- To prescribe minimum standard of education required for qualifying as a pharmacist. (Ref.: section 10 of the Pharmacy Act)
- Framing of Education Regulations prescribing the conditions to be fulfilled by the institutions seeking approval of the PCI for imparting education in pharmacy. (Ref.: section 10 of the Pharmacy Act)
- To ensure uniform implementation of the educational standards throughout the country. (Ref. : section 10 of the Pharmacy Act)
- Inspection of Pharmacy Institutions seeking approval under the Pharmacy Act to verify availability of the prescribed norms. (Ref.: section 16 of the Pharmacy Act)
- To approve the course of study and examination for pharmacists i.e. approval of the academic training institutions providing pharmacy courses. (Ref. : section 12 of the Pharmacy Act)
- To withdraw approval, if the approved course of study or an approved examination does not continue to be in conformity with the educational standards prescribed by the PCI. (Ref.: section 13 of the Pharmacy Act)
- To approve qualifications granted outside the territories to which the Pharmacy Act extends i.e. the approval of foreign qualification. (Ref. : section 14 of the Pharmacy Act)
- To maintain Central Register of Pharmacists. (Ref. : section 15 A of the Pharmacy Act)
