= List of institutions of higher education in Uttarakhand =

List of higher education institutions in Uttarakhand, India

The list of institutions of higher education in Uttarakhand includes institutes of national importance, central universities, state universities, deemed universities, private universities, and numerous autonomous and government degree colleges.

Uttarakhand, a state in northern India, has emerged as a major educational hub, particularly in cities like Dehradun, Roorkee, and Pantnagar. Higher education in the state is regulated by the University Grants Commission (UGC), along with statutory bodies such as the All India Council for Technical Education (AICTE), the National Medical Commission (NMC), and the Indian Council of Agricultural Research (ICAR).

The state is home to highly prestigious national institutes, including the Indian Institute of Technology Roorkee, the Indian Institute of Management Kashipur, the National Institute of Technology Uttarakhand, and the All India Institute of Medical Sciences Rishikesh. As of 2026, Uttarakhand also hosts over 30 private universities, making it one of the largest hubs for private higher education in North India.

== Institutes of National Importance ==
Location	Institute name	Established	Specialization
Roorkee	Indian Institute of Technology Roorkee	1847 (2001‡)	Technology and management
Srinagar	National Institute of Technology Uttarakhand	2010	Technology
Kashipur	Indian Institute of Management Kashipur	2011	Management
Rishikesh	All India Institute of Medical Sciences Rishikesh	2012	Medical research and technology

‡University of Roorkee was granted status of IIT in 2001.

== Central universities ==
Central universities are established by an Act of Parliament and are directly funded and regulated by the Department of Higher Education in the Union Ministry of Education. Uttarakhand currently has one central university.

Central Universities in Uttarakhand
Location	University Name	Established	Specialization
Srinagar	Hemvati Nandan Bahuguna Garhwal University	1973 (2009‡)	General Multidisciplinary

‡ Originally established as a State University in 1973; elevated to Central University status in 2009 under the Central Universities Act.

== State universities ==
Location	University name	Established	Specialization
Dehradun	Doon University	2005	General
Pantnagar	G.B. Pant University of Agriculture and Technology	1960	Agriculture and technology
Dehradun	H.N.B. Uttarakhand Medical Education University	2014	Medicine
Nainital & Bhimtal	Kumaun University (2 campuses)	1973	General
Almora, Bageshwar & Pithoragarh	Soban Singh Jeena University	2020	General
Badhshahithaul (Tehri)	Sri Dev Suman Uttarakhand University	2012	General
Almora	Uttarakhand Aawasiya Vishwavidyalaya	2016	General
Dehradun	Uttarakhand Ayurveda University	2009	Ayurveda
Haldwani	Uttarakhand Open University	2005	Distance learning
Haridwar	Uttarakhand Sanskrit University	2005	Sanskrit
Haldwani	Uttarakhand State Sports University	2025	Sports
Dehradun	Veer Madho Singh Bhandari Uttarakhand Technical University	2008	Technology
Bharsar (Pauri) and Ranichauri (Tehri)	Veer Chandra Singh Garhwali Uttarakhand University of Horticulture and Forestry (2 campuses)	2011	Horticulture and forestry

== Deemed universities ==
Location	University name	Established	Specialization
Dehradun	Forest Research Institute	1906 (1991‡)	Forestry research
Haridwar	Gurukula Kangri Vishwavidyalaya^	1902 (1962‡)	Ancient Vedic, technology and management
Dehradun	Graphic Era University	1993 (2008‡)	Engineering, Management, Humanities & Social Sciences, Commerce and Computer Applications

‡ Granted status of deemed university. ^ Gurukul Kangri Vishwavidyalaya is divided into three campuses: Main Campus, Haridwar; Kanya Gurukul Campus, Dehradun; and Kanya Gurukul Campus, Haridwar.

== Private Universities ==
Private Universities in Uttarakhand
Location	University name	Established	Specialization
Haldwani	Amrapali University	1999 (2024‡)	Technology, Management, and Hospitality
Kotdwar	Bhagwant Global University	2016	Technology and Management
Roorkee	COER University	1998	Engineering
Dehradun	DBS Global University	2007 (2024‡)	Management, Technology, and Liberal Arts
Dehradun	Dev Bhoomi Uttarakhand University	2005	Technology, Management, and Pharmacy
Haridwar	Dev Sanskriti Vishwavidyalaya	2002	Yoga, Psychology, Animation, and Computer Science
Dehradun	DIT University	2013	Technology and Management
Uregi (Pauri Garhwal)	Ethics University	2025	Engineering, Management, IT, and Agriculture
Haldwani, Bhimtal & Dehradun	Graphic Era Hill University (3 campuses)	2011	Technology and Management
Roorkee	Haridwar University (formerly Roorkee College of Engineering)	2010 (2023‡)	Technology and Management
Dehradun	IMS Unison University	2013	Law, Technology, and Management
Dehradun	Jigyasa University (formerly Himgiri Zee University)	2003	Communication, Technology, and Management
Pauri Garhwal	Maharaja Agrasen Himalayan Garhwal University	2016	General Multidisciplinary
Dehradun	Maya Devi University	2010 (2024‡)	Technology, Management, and Agriculture
Bhimtal	Mind Power University	2024	General Multidisciplinary
Roorkee	Motherhood University (2 campuses)	2015	Law, Pharmacy, Paramedical, and Management
Roorkee	Phonics University	2009	Engineering, Pharmacy, and Applied Sciences
Roorkee	Quantum University	2017	IR 4.0 Technologies, Management, Law, and Arts
Dehradun	Ras Bihari Bose Subharti University	2016	General Multidisciplinary
Dehradun	Sardar Bhagwan Singh University	1994 (2018‡)	Biomedical Sciences, Pharmacy, and Allied Health
Haridwar	Shree Om University	2007	Management, Pharmacy, Engineering, and Education
Dehradun	Shri Guru Ram Rai University	2017	Technology, Management, and Medical Sciences
Uttarkashi	Smt. Manjira Devi University	2024	Law, Engineering, and Management
Dehradun	Sparsh Himalaya University (formerly Himalayiya University)	2019	Medical and Allied Sciences
Kichha	Surajmal University	2021	Technology and Management
Dehradun	Swami Rama Himalayan University	1989 (2007‡)	Medicine and Technology
Dehradun	The ICFAI University, Dehradun	2003	Law, Technology, Management, and Education
Dehradun	The University of North West Himalayas	2025	General Multidisciplinary
Roorkee	University of Engineering and Technology, Roorkee	2021	Technology and Management
Haridwar	University of Patanjali	2006	Yoga and Ayurveda
Dehradun	University of Petroleum and Energy Studies	2003	Computer Science, Petroleum, and Energy
Dehradun	Uttaranchal University	2013	Law, Technology, and Management

‡ Indicates the year originally established as an institute (Year formally granted Private University status by the State Legislature).

== Government Degree and Post Graduate Colleges ==
Uttarakhand's higher education infrastructure includes a large network of government-funded colleges affiliated with state universities like Kumaun University, Sri Dev Suman Uttarakhand University, and Soban Singh Jeena University.

Notable Government Colleges in Uttarakhand
Location	College Name	Established	Affiliation
Bageshwar	Government Post Graduate College, Bageshwar	1974	Soban Singh Jeena University
Dehradun	D.A.V. College, Dehradun	1948	Hemvati Nandan Bahuguna Garhwal University
Gopeshwar	Government Post Graduate College, Gopeshwar	1968	Sri Dev Suman Uttarakhand University
Haldwani	Motiram Baburam Government Post Graduate College	1960	Kumaun University
Haldwani	Indira Priyadarshini Government Girls Post Graduate College	1996	Kumaun University
Kashipur	Radhey Hari Government Post Graduate College	1973	Kumaun University
Khatima	Hemwati Nandan Bahuguna Government Post Graduate College	1989	Kumaun University
Kotdwar	Dr. P.D.B.H. Government Post Graduate College	1971	Hemvati Nandan Bahuguna Garhwal University
Pithoragarh	Laxman Singh Mahar Government Post Graduate College	1963	Soban Singh Jeena University
Ramnagar	P.N.G. Government Post Graduate College	1976	Kumaun University
Ranikhet	Government Post Graduate College, Ranikhet	1973	Kumaun University
Rishikesh	Pandit Lalit Mohan Sharma Government Post Graduate College	1993	Sri Dev Suman Uttarakhand University
Rudrapur	Sardar Bhagat Singh Government Post Graduate College	1974	Kumaun University

== Private and Autonomous Degree Colleges ==
This section includes notable standalone private technical institutes, engineering colleges, and autonomous degree colleges recognized by the AICTE and affiliated with state technical or general universities.

Notable Private and Autonomous Colleges
Location	College Name	Established	Affiliation / Status
Bhimtal	Birla Institute of Applied Sciences	1969	Veer Madho Singh Bhandari Uttarakhand Technical University
Dehradun	Himalayan Institute of Technology	2001	Sri Dev Suman Uttarakhand University
Dehradun	Kukreja Institute of Hotel Management and Catering Technology	2005	Sri Dev Suman Uttarakhand University
Dehradun	Law College, Dehradun	2001	Uttaranchal University
Dehradun	Tula's Institute	2006	Veer Madho Singh Bhandari Uttarakhand Technical University
Gopeshwar	Institute of Technology Gopeshwar	2013	Veer Madho Singh Bhandari Uttarakhand Technical University
Pantnagar	College of Technology, Pantnagar	1966	G. B. Pant University of Agriculture and Technology
Roorkee	College of Advanced Technology	2006	Veer Madho Singh Bhandari Uttarakhand Technical University
Roorkee	Roorkee Institute of Technology (RIT)	2005	Veer Madho Singh Bhandari Uttarakhand Technical University

== See also ==
- Education in Uttarakhand
- List of institutions of higher education in India
- List of universities in India
