= List of colleges affiliated with Kumaun University =

List of higher education institutions affiliated with Kumaun University

Kumaun University functions as a residential-cum-affiliating institution (AISHE Code: U-0562). It directly administers three constituent campuses and serves as the affiliating body for government postgraduate colleges, government degree colleges, and privately-managed self-financed institutions across the southern and central sectors of the Kumaon division.

== Institutional summary ==
Summary of institutions affiliated with Kumaun University
Category	Type / Jurisdiction	Number of institutions
Constituent Campuses	Directly administered by Kumaun University (Nainital)	3
Government Colleges	Nainital District	9
Government Colleges	Udham Singh Nagar District	9
Self-Financed & Private	Management, Technology & Professional	8
Self-Financed & Private	Law Colleges (BCI Approved)	4
Self-Financed & Private	Teacher Education & B.Ed (NCTE Approved)	5
Self-Financed & Private	General Degree, Science & Specialized	6
Total affiliated network		39+

== Territorial jurisdiction and history ==
Kumaun University was established on 23 November 1973 under the Uttar Pradesh State Universities Act, 1973 (Act No. 10 of 1973), created alongside Garhwal University to decentralise higher education in the Himalayan region of Uttar Pradesh (now Uttarakhand).

From its founding until 2020, Kumaun University exercised jurisdiction across all six districts of the Kumaon administrative division: Almora, Bageshwar, Champawat, Nainital, Pithoragarh, and Udham Singh Nagar.

=== 2020 territorial reorganization ===
On 13 August 2020, the Government of Uttarakhand enacted the Soban Singh Jeena University Act, 2019 (Uttarakhand Act No. 19 of 2020), formally establishing Soban Singh Jeena University (SSJU) in Almora as an independent state university.

Under this bifurcation:

- The Almora constituent campus of Kumaun University (the historic Almora Government College, founded in 1951) was transferred to serve as the headquarters and primary campus of SSJU.
- All government, aided, and private colleges located within the four upper-hill districts"Almora, Bageshwar, Champawat, and Pithoragarh"were disaffiliated from Kumaun University and transferred to SSJU.
- Kumaun University retained exclusive affiliating authority over institutions located in Nainital district and Udham Singh Nagar district.

== Admissions and curriculum ==
Admissions to undergraduate and postgraduate programs across all affiliated colleges are conducted through the state-wide centralised digital platform Samarth eGov Suite managed by the Department of Higher Education, Uttarakhand. The university and its affiliated institutions implement the National Education Policy 2020 (NEP 2020) curriculum, featuring a Choice Based Credit System (CBCS), multidisciplinary degree pathways, and research-integrated undergraduate honours frameworks.

== Constituent campuses ==
Kumaun University maintains three constituent campuses administered directly by the university executive authority:

Campus name	Location	District	Established	Specialisation and notes
Dev Singh Bisht (D.S.B.) Campus	Nainital	Nainital	1951 (college); 1973 (campus)	Central administrative and academic headquarters; Humanities, Physical Sciences, Life Sciences, Commerce, Law, and the Himalaya Museum
Sir J.C. Bose Technical Campus	Bhimtal	Nainital	2004	Department of Pharmaceutical Sciences (NIRF Ranked 73rd in India, 2025), Management Studies, Biotechnology, and Computer Applications
Meru Campus	Patwadangar	Nainital	2023	Multidisciplinary education, research, and innovation center funded under the Central MERU-DST initiative

== Government and government-aided colleges ==
=== Nainital District ===
Government postgraduate and degree colleges located in Nainital district affiliated with Kumaun University:

College name	Location	Established	Level	Accreditation / Status	Key faculties
Motiram Baburam Government Post Graduate College	Haldwani	1960	Postgraduate	NAAC B Grade; UGC 2(f) & 12(B)	Arts, Science, Commerce, Education (B.Ed), Management, Doctoral Studies
Pt. Naintara Dutt Pandey (P.N.G.) Government Post Graduate College	Ramnagar	1976	Postgraduate	UGC 2(f) & 12(B)	Arts, Science, Commerce, Education
Government Girls Post Graduate College (Government Women College)	Nawabi Road, Haldwani	1996	Postgraduate	NAAC Accredited	Arts, Commerce, Home Science, Vocational
Government Post Graduate College, Betalghat	Betalghat	1993	Postgraduate	UGC 2(f) & 12(B)	Arts, Science, Commerce
Government Degree College, Kotabag	Kotabag	2001	Undergraduate / PG	UGC Recognized	Arts, Science, Commerce
Government Degree College, Maldhanchaur	Maldhanchaur, Ramnagar	2005	Undergraduate	State Govt.	Arts, Commerce
Government Degree College, Halduchaur	Halduchaur, Haldwani	2014	Undergraduate	State Govt.	Arts, Commerce
Government Degree College, Patlot	Patlot, Okhalkanda	2014	Undergraduate	State Govt.	Arts, Humanities
Government Degree College, Haldwani City (Gaulapar)	Haldwani	2018	Undergraduate	State Govt.	Arts, Science, Commerce

=== Udham Singh Nagar District ===
Government postgraduate and degree colleges located in Udham Singh Nagar district affiliated with Kumaun University:

College name	Location	Established	Level	Accreditation / Status	Key faculties
Sardar Bhagat Singh Government Post Graduate College, Rudrapur	Rudrapur	1974	Postgraduate	NAAC B++ Grade; UGC 2(f) & 12(B)	Arts, Science, Commerce, Computer Science, B.Ed, Doctoral Research
Radhey Hari Government Post Graduate College, Kashipur	Kashipur	1973	Postgraduate	NAAC B Grade; UGC 2(f) & 12(B)	Arts, Science, Commerce, Management, B.Ed, Doctoral Research
Hemwati Nandan Bahuguna (H.N.B.) Government Post Graduate College	Khatima	1975	Postgraduate	UGC 2(f) & 12(B)	Arts, Science, Commerce, B.Ed
Government Post Graduate College, Bajpur	Bajpur	1989	Postgraduate	UGC 2(f) & 12(B)	Arts, Science, Commerce
Government Post Graduate College, Sitarganj	Sitarganj	2014	Postgraduate	State Govt.	Arts, Science, Commerce
Government Degree College, Jaspur	Jaspur	2001	Undergraduate	State Govt.	Arts, Science, Commerce
Government Girls Degree College, Jaspur	Jaspur	2014	Undergraduate	State Govt. (Women only)	Arts, Humanities
Government Degree College, Dineshpur	Dineshpur	2015	Undergraduate	State Govt.	Arts, Commerce
Government Degree College, Nanakmatta	Nanakmatta	2016	Undergraduate	State Govt.	Arts, Humanities

== Self-financed and private affiliated institutions ==
Kumaun University affiliates various private and self-financed institutions across professional, managerial, legal, technical, and teacher education disciplines.

=== Management, Technology, and Professional Colleges ===
Institute name	Location	District	Established	Specialisations / Programs
Amrapali Institute of Management and Computer Applications	Shiksha Nagar, Lamachaur, Haldwani	Nainital	1999	MBA, MCA, BBA, BCA, Hotel Management
Pal College of Technology and Management (PCTM)	RTO Road, Haldwani	Nainital	2004	BBA, BCA, BHM, B.Com, Biotechnology
Shriram Institute of Management and Technology	Kashipur	Udham Singh Nagar	2004	BBA, BCA, MBA, Applied Sciences
Saraswati Institute of Management and Technology	Rudrapur	Udham Singh Nagar	2007	BBA, BCA, B.Com, Education
Trinity Institute of Professional Studies	Haldwani	Nainital	2008	BBA, BCA, B.Com (Honours)
Gyanarthi Media College	Kashipur	Udham Singh Nagar	2014	Journalism & Mass Communication, Animation, Design
Swami Vivekanand College of Management & Technology	Gaulapar, Haldwani	Nainital	2006	Management, Computer Applications
S.C. Guria Institute of Management and Technology	Kashipur	Udham Singh Nagar	2005	MBA, BBA, BCA

=== Law Colleges ===
College name	Location	District	Degrees offered	Regulatory approval
Vasudev College of Law	Lamachaur, Haldwani	Nainital	LL.B (3 Years), B.A. LL.B (5 Years Integrated)	BCI Approved
Chanakya Law College	Bhootbangla, Rudrapur	Udham Singh Nagar	LL.B, B.A. LL.B, LL.M	BCI Approved
Unity Law College	Kichha Road, Rudrapur	Udham Singh Nagar	LL.B (3 Years), B.A. LL.B (5 Years)	BCI Approved
S.C. Guria Law College	Kashipur	Udham Singh Nagar	LL.B, Integrated Law	BCI Approved

=== Teacher Education and B.Ed Colleges ===
College name	Location	District	Programs offered	Regulatory approval
Inspiration College of Teacher Education	Kathgodam, Haldwani	Nainital	B.Ed, M.Ed	NCTE Approved
Jai Arihant College of Teacher Education	Haldwani	Nainital	B.Ed	NCTE Approved
Mariyam Institute of Higher Studies	Nawabi Road, Haldwani	Nainital	B.Ed, Teacher Training	NCTE Approved
Shri Guru Nanak Dev College of Teacher Education	Nanakmatta	Udham Singh Nagar	B.Ed	NCTE Approved
Guru Nanak B.Ed College	Kashipur	Udham Singh Nagar	B.Ed	NCTE Approved

=== General Degree, Science, and Specialized Colleges ===
College name	Location	District	Key academic areas
Shri Guru Nanak Degree College	Rudrapur	Udham Singh Nagar	B.A., B.Sc., B.Com
Samrat Prithviraj Chauhan College	Kashipur	Udham Singh Nagar	Arts, Science, Commerce
Sanatan Dharma Kanya Mahavidyalaya	Rudrapur	Udham Singh Nagar	Women's Degree Education (B.A., B.Com)
Dev Bhumi Institute of Professional Education	Rudrapur	Udham Singh Nagar	Undergraduate Professional Programs
Devsthali Vidyapeeth College of Bio-Sciences	Lalpur, Rudrapur	Udham Singh Nagar	Biotechnology, Microbiology, Bio-sciences
Vidya Jyoti Degree College	Bazpur	Udham Singh Nagar	B.A., B.Sc., B.Com

== Former affiliated colleges transferred to SSJU in 2020 ==
With the enactment of Uttarakhand Act No. 19 of 2020 on 13 August 2020, colleges in the districts of Almora, Bageshwar, Champawat, and Pithoragarh were transferred from Kumaun University to Soban Singh Jeena University (SSJU). Major transferred institutions and upgraded campuses include:

Former College Name	Location	District	Current status under SSJU
Soban Singh Jeena (SSJ) Government PG College, Almora	Almora	Almora	Primary Constituent Campus (SSJ Campus)
Laxman Singh Mahar Government Postgraduate College	Pithoragarh	Pithoragarh	Upgraded to LSM Constituent Campus (2020)
Pt. Badri Dutt Pandey Government Post Graduate College	Bageshwar	Bageshwar	Upgraded to BDP Constituent Campus (2020)
Government Post Graduate College, Champawat	Champawat	Champawat	Upgraded to Champawat Constituent Campus (2022)
Government Post Graduate College, Ranikhet	Ranikhet	Almora	Affiliated PG College (SSJU)
Government Post Graduate College, Lohaghat	Lohaghat	Champawat	Affiliated PG College (SSJU)
Government Post Graduate College, Berinag	Berinag	Pithoragarh	Affiliated PG College (SSJU)
Government Post Graduate College, Dwarahat	Dwarahat	Almora	Affiliated PG College (SSJU)
Government Post Graduate College, Syalde	Syalde	Almora	Affiliated PG College (SSJU)
Government Degree College, Gangolihat	Gangolihat	Pithoragarh	Affiliated Degree College (SSJU)

== See also ==
- Kumaun University
- Soban Singh Jeena University
- List of institutions of higher education in Uttarakhand
