= List of Motiram Baburam Government Post Graduate College faculty =

Faculty of MBGPG College, Haldwani

This list of Motiram Baburam Government Post Graduate College faculty records notable current and former professors, lecturers, and researchers at Motiram Baburam Government Post Graduate College (MBGPG College) in Haldwani, Uttarakhand, India. (Note: Individuals included in this list satisfy standards for stand-alone lists by having received recognized awards, authored published academic books, or published peer-reviewed research in indexed international journals.)

== Administration ==
Name	Department	Academic & Administrative Contributions	Ref.
Narendra Singh Bankoti	Administration	Principal of the college. Proctorial supervisor for regional university examinations and coordinator for NAAC institutional accreditation.	

== Faculty of Arts ==
Name	Department	Academic & Literary Contributions	Ref.
H. S. Bhakuni	History	Regional historian. Member of the research team that conducted archaeological analysis on 40 historical human skeletons found in Gaulapar in 2017. Nodal Officer of the college Anti-Drug Cell.	
Govind Singh Bora	Music	Classical Hindustani vocalist and musicologist. Coordinator of college cultural delegations and leader of the Rover Scout unit.	
Akshay Gururani	English	Literary critic. Published research on archetype theory, including "The Wild Woman Archetype in The Outrun" in the Research Journal of English Language and Literature.	
Kiran Mishra	English	Literary scholar and Assistant Professor in the Department of English. Co-organizer for the international academic conference on gender roles and environmental concepts.	
Tribhuwan Chandra Pandey	Education (B.Ed.)	Received the Radha Krishnan National Teacher Award. Author of Pedagogical Innovations in Higher Education and 13 academic books. Author of 14 research papers on teacher education.	
Bhesh Raj Pant	Geography	Specialist in nutritional geography and agricultural land use in the Central Himalaya. Advisory board member of the Geographical Society of Central Himalaya. Author of Women and Nutrition in Himalaya and 60 research papers.	
Prabha Pant	Hindi	Author and folklorist. Received the Gajanan Madhav Muktibodh Award from the Madhya Pradesh Sahitya Akademi and the Santosh Srivastava Story Award for Faas. Author of over 20 books documenting Kumaoni folk literature.	
Deeksha Tripathi	English		

== Faculty of Science ==
Name	Department	Academic & Scientific Contributions	Ref.
Kamika Chaudhary	Computer Science	Officer Commanding of 1 UK Air Wing NCC. Recognized by the Women's Indian Chamber of Commerce and Industry (WICCI). Published research on wireless sensor network clustering protocols in Wireless Personal Communications.	
Charu Chandra Dhondiyal	Physics	Condensed matter physicist. Published experimental research on samarium and rare-earth doped zinc phosphate glasses for optical fiber amplification in Materials Today: Proceedings.	
Naval Kishore Lohani	Physics	Solar astrophysicist and author of A Text Book of Mechanics. Researcher on Coronal Mass Ejections (CME) and solar wind geomagnetic coupling during solar cycles 23 to 25. Convener of the Career Counselling and Placement Cell.	
Chandra Singh Negi	Zoology	Ecologist and ethnobiologist. Head of the Ecology and Biodiversity Laboratory. Researcher on sacred natural sites and the harvesting economics of caterpillar fungus (Ophiocordyceps sinensis). Consultant for ICIMOD and author of Askote Conservation Landscape: Culture, Biodiversity and Economy.	
Bipin Chandra Pathak	Zoology	Fish biologist and ecotoxicologist. Researched environmental stress adaptations, endocrine disruption, and biochemical profiling of the Himalayan trout (Opsarius bendelisis) in the Journal of Environmental Biology.	
Pushpa Ruwali	Biotechnology	Pharmacological researcher. Evaluated in vitro immunomodulatory effects of Himalayan wormwood (Artemisia indica) extracts on lymphocytes in Veterinary World.	
Narendra Sijwali	Mathematics	Received the HDD Achievement Award (2024-25) for mathematics education. Active in mathematical analysis, metric space topologies, and regional academic outreach.	
Jeewan Singh	Physics	Theoretical physicist. Published mathematical research on the quaternionic reformulated field equations of dyons in Communications in Physics.	
Deepak Kumar Tiwari	Mathematics	Researcher in magnetohydrodynamics and interfacial stability. Published models on electrohydrodynamic capillary instability of cylindrical interfaces in the Ain Shams Engineering Journal.	
Richa Tiwari	Mathematics	Pure mathematician in complex analysis. Researched growth orders and composite entire functions in the Tamkang Journal of Mathematics.	

== Faculty of Commerce ==
Name	Department	Academic & Economic Contributions	Ref.
Bhuwan Chandra Melkani	Commerce	Tourism researcher. Published studies on homestay operations and rural tourism economics in Uttarakhand in the Universal Review of Natural Disaster Studies.	
Vijay Laxmi Sharma	Commerce	Applied economist. Published field studies assessing the role of Micro, Small, and Medium Enterprises (MSMEs) in local employment across Nainital district in IJAEM.	
Rohit Joshi	Commerce		

== See also ==
- Motiram Baburam Government Post Graduate College
