= Indian School of Hospitality =

Training school in Gurugram, India

Coordinates: 28°23′32″N 76°58′30″E

- Type: Hospitality and culinary institute
- Established: 2018
- Founders: Dilip Puri, Kunal Vasudeva
- Parent institution: Sommet Education
- Affiliations: Gurugram University
- Academic staff: 24 (2024–25)
- Students: 342 (2024–25)
- Location: Gurugram, Haryana, India
- Campus: Urban
- Website: https://www.ish.edu.in/

Indian School of Hospitality (ISH) is a Hospitality and culinary education institution in Gurugram, Haryana, India. It was established in 2018 by hotelier Dilip Puri, formerly managing director of Starwood Hotels and Resorts South Asia, and co-founder Kunal Vasudeva. Since 2021 it has been majority-owned by the Swiss hospitality education group Sommet Education. The school's degree programmes are affiliated with Gurugram University.

== History ==
The school was announced in November 2017, with a campus under development at INXT City Centre in Sector 83, Gurugram, ahead of a first intake of students in August 2018. The institute partnered with Lausanne Hospitality Consulting for curriculum development and faculty training in preparation for academic certification by École hôtelière de Lausanne. The campus was formally inaugurated in August 2018 by Amitabh Kant, then chief executive officer of NITI Aayog.

In August 2021, Sommet Education acquired a majority stake in the school for undisclosed terms. The agreement brought two Sommet-owned institutions to India through ISH: culinary school École Ducasse, and hospitality business school Les Roches, with which ISH entered an academic alliance for its hospitality management programmes.

== Academic programmes ==
The school has undergraduate degree programmes affiliated with Gurugram University, including a BBA in hospitality management and a bachelor's degree in culinary arts. Its postgraduate certificate programmes in management and hospitality management are approved by the All India Council for Technical Education (AICTE). Culinary programmes are delivered with École Ducasse, and hospitality management programmes in alliance with Les Roches.

== Accreditation and affiliation ==
ISH is an affiliated college of Gurugram University, a state university established under the Haryana Act 17 of 2017.

The institution is operated by the DPA Institute of Tourism and Hospitality Education and holds AICTE approval, first granted as a Letter of Approval in May 2024 and extended for the 2025–26 and 2026–27 academic years. It reports to the All India Survey on Higher Education under institution code C-61433.
