= IUU =

IUU, an acronym, may refer to:

- Illegal, unreported and unregulated fishing
- IMS Unison University
