= Himalayan Institute of Technology =

University in Dehradun, India

Himalayan Institute Of Technology
- HIT Dehradun
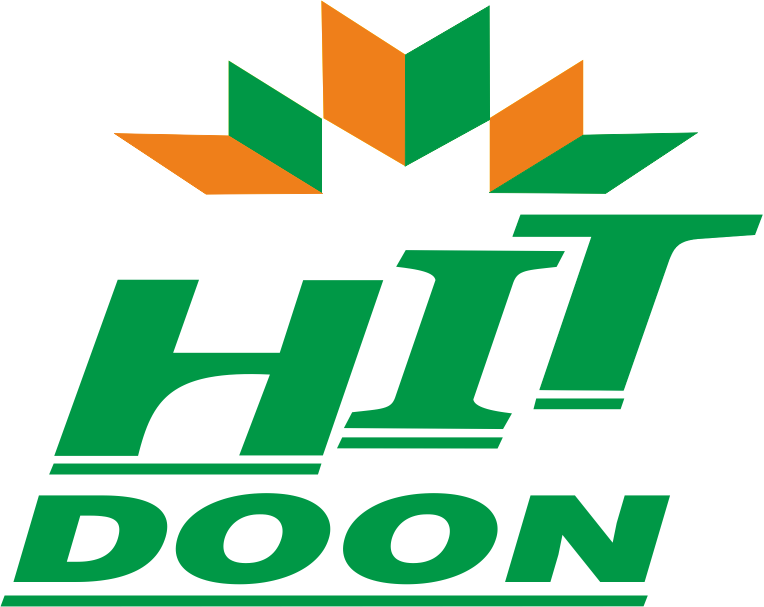
- Motto: Learning Today Leading Tomorrow
- Type: College
- Established: 2001; 25 years ago
- Affiliations: UGC, Hemvati Nandan Bahuguna Garhwal University, Sri Dev Suman Uttarakhand University, MHRD
- Chairman: Shri Ajay Jsola
- Academic staff: 100+
- Location: Dehradun, Uttarakhand, India
- Campus: Urban
- Colours: Blue black
- Nickname: HITians
- Website: www.hitdoon.ac.in

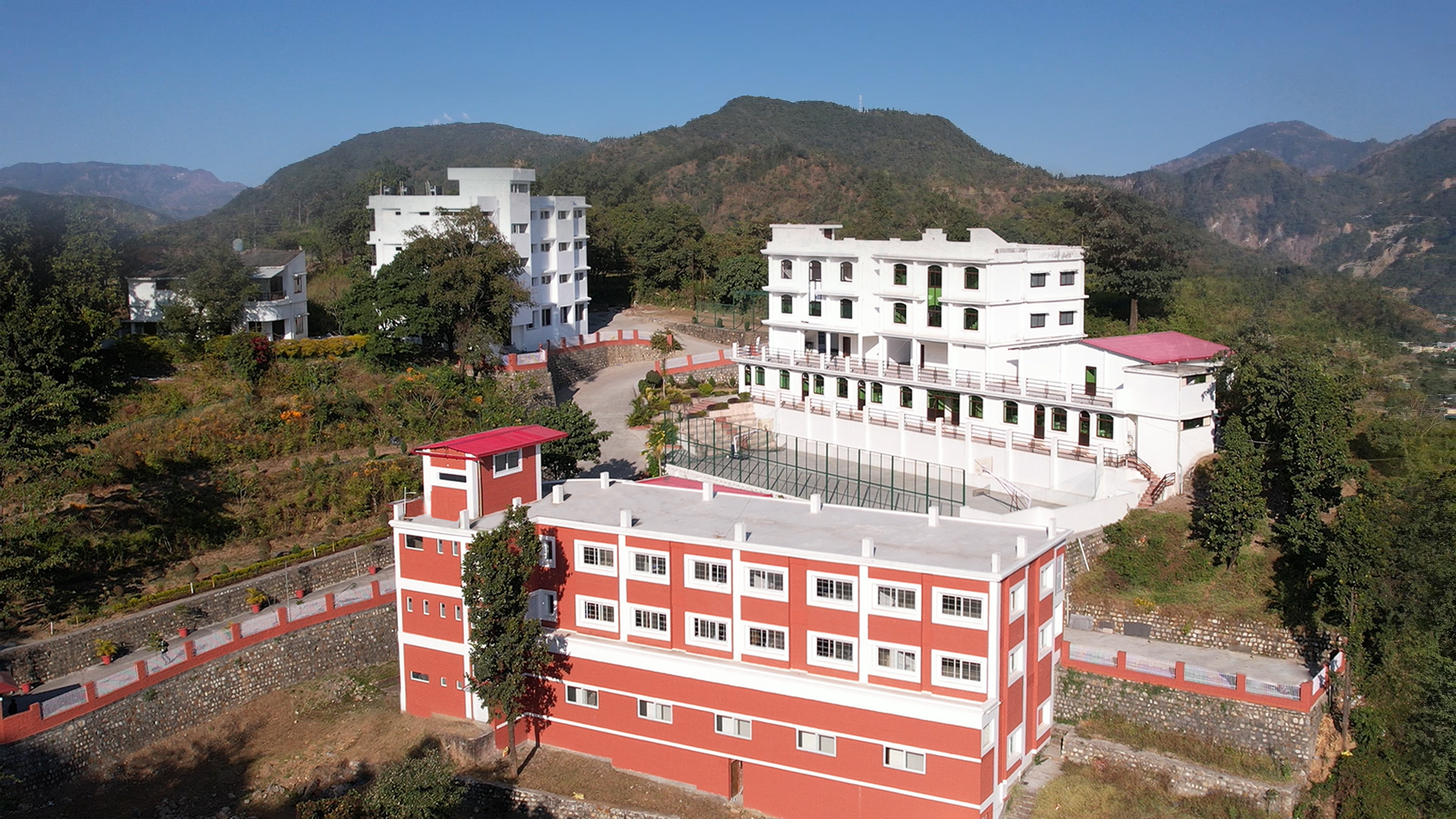
Aerial view of the Campus

Himalayan Institute of Technology - HIT Dehradun is a College located in Dehradun, Uttarakhand. It was established in 2001 and is affiliated to HNBG Central University & SDSU State University for Bachelor of Hotel Management, BBA, BCA, BSc Agriculture, BSc Forestry, BSc-IT, BCom, MSc-IT, MCom, MSc Agronomy, and other courses and degrees. The motto of HIT Dehradun is "Learning Today, Leading Tomorrow".

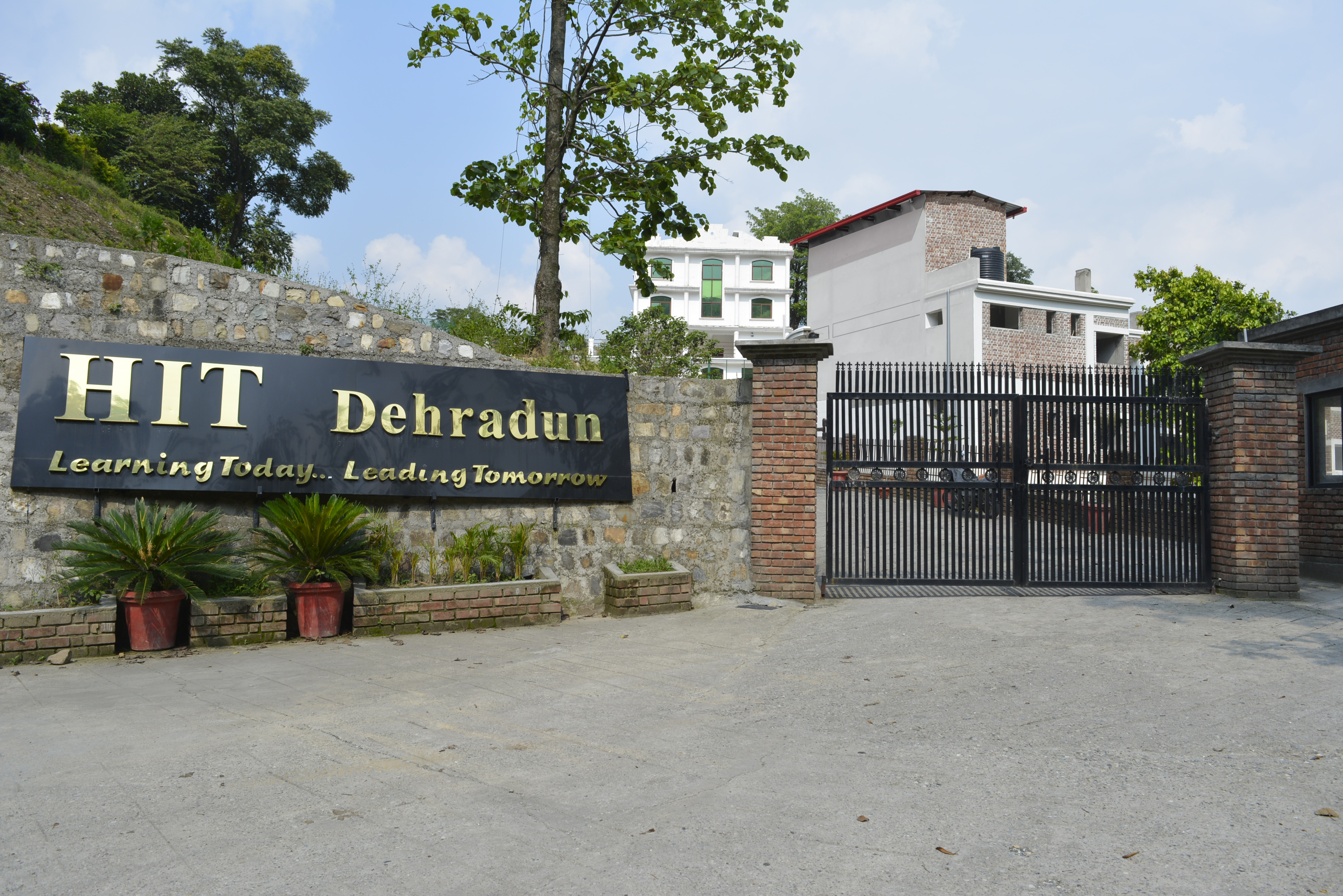
Himalayan Institute of Technology Campus Entry Gate

== History ==
Himalayan Institute of Technology – HIT Dehradun was established in 2001 with a vision of quality education to all. Initially, the college had its campus at Haridwar Road, Dehradun. Presently, HIT Dehradun has two campuses - the old campus at Haridwar Road, Dehradun, and the new campus at Asthal, Dehradun.

== Recognition and Accreditation ==
- Affiliated to HNBG Central University
- Sri Dev Suman University
- Approved by UGC
- Approved by Ministry of HRD, Government of India
- Recognised by Government of Uttarakhand.

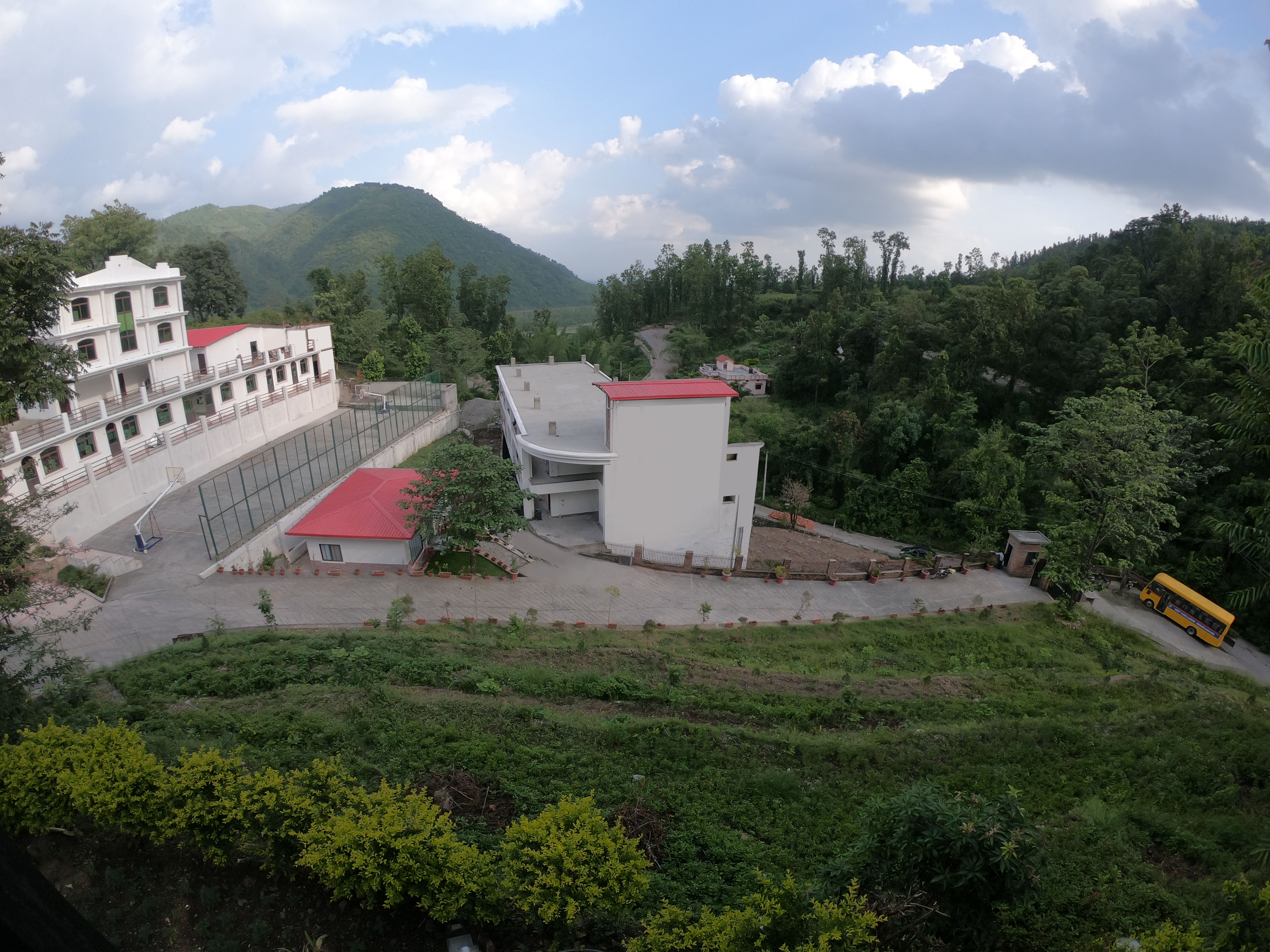
Panorama View

== Admission ==
Admissions in HIT Dehradun in all the courses are on the basis of merit.

== Facilities ==
The Institute has a scenic campus in the foothills of the Himalayas with wifi, Well stocked library, Hostel Facilities, Sports Facilities, Practical Labs, Transport Facility, etc.

== Academics ==
HIT Dehradun is conducting 15 courses from Central University and state university under 6 departments

- Department of Hotel Management
- Department of Agricultural science
- Department of IT & Computer Sciences
- Department of Management
- Department of Commerce
- Department of Applied Sciences

== List of Courses ==
- Bachelor of Hotel Management
- BSc Agriculture
- BSc Forestry
- BBA
- BCA
- BSc- IT
- B Com
- B Com Hons.
- BSc – Biotechnology
- BSc- PCM/ ZBC
- MSc –IT
- MCom
- MSc Agronomy
- MSc Soil Science
- MSc Genetic & Plant Breeding

== Placement ==
HIT Dehradun- Himalayan Institute of Technology has a dedicated Training and Placement Cell to guide students to choose the right career.
