= Institute of Management Studies =

Institute of Management Studies may refer to one of several institutes in India:

- Institute of Management Studies, former name of IMS Unison University, Uttarakhand
- Institute of Management Studies, Banaras Hindu University, Uttar Pradesh
- Institute of Management Studies, Devi Ahilya University, Madhya Pradesh
- Institute of Management Studies, Ranchi, Ranchi University, Jharkhand
