= Prabha Pant =

Indian academic, author, poet, and folklorist

- प्रभा पंत
- Born: July 7, 1962 (age 64); Sela, Almora district, Uttarakhand, India
- Employer(s): Motiram Baburam Government Post Graduate College, Haldwani
- Known for: Kumaoni folklore preservation, Hindi literature, Bal Sahitya (Children's literature)
- Title: Professor and Head of the Hindi Department
- Spouse: M. M. Pant
- Parents: Manorama Joshi; Shiv Dutt Joshi
- Awards: Santosh Srivastava Katha Samman (2024); Gajanan Madhav Muktibodh Puraskar (2022)

Academic background
- Education: Bareilly College (BA, MA, BEd); Kumaun University (PhD)

Academic work
- Notable works: Faans; Folklores of Kumaon; Karmayogi Sarla Behn

Prabha Pant (born 7 July 1962) is an Indian academic, author, poet, and folklorist. She is a Professor and the Head of the Hindi Department at Motiram Baburam Government Post Graduate College in Haldwani, Uttarakhand. Pant writes about the Kumaoni language, regional oral traditions, Hindi fiction, and children's literature. In 2022, she received the Gajanan Madhav Muktibodh Puraskar from the Madhya Pradesh Sahitya Academy for her short story collection Meri Pratinidhi Kahaniyan.

== Early life and education ==
Pant was born on 7 July 1962 in the village of Sela, located in the Almora district of Uttarakhand. In an interview with the Madhya Pradesh Sahitya Academy, Pant stated that the Almora region's culture and local mythology influenced her early life. She obtained a Bachelor of Arts degree in 1982, a Master of Arts in Hindi Literature in 1984, and a Bachelor of Education in 1985, all from Bareilly College. She received a Ph.D. from Kumaun University, Nainital, in 1992. Her doctoral thesis was a folkloristic study of narrative elements and motifs in Kumaoni folktales and ballads.

== Personal life ==
Pant was born in the Almora district to Manorama Joshi and Shiv Dutt Joshi, and is married to M. M. Pant. She has a daughter, Yashasvi Nanda, who in January 2025 accepted the inaugural Santosh Srivastava Katha Samman on her mother's behalf.

== Academic and professional career ==
Pant began her academic career in May 1997 as an assistant professor at L.S.M. Government P.G. College in Pithoragarh. She transferred to Motiram Baburam Government Post Graduate College in Haldwani as an associate professor in 2009. She was promoted to Professor in 2014 and later became the Head of the Hindi Department. She has supervised doctoral candidates researching regional literature, folk culture, and feminist studies. She has been a member of the managing and selection committees for the Uttarakhand Bhasha Sansthan (Uttarakhand Language Institute). Since 2012, she has also worked as a counselor for the Mahila Aichhik Bureau of the Uttarakhand Police in Haldwani. Pant participates in regional literary conferences. For instance, at the National Kumaoni Language Conference, she gave a lecture on Kumaoni memorial literature (Smarak Sahitya).

== Literary works ==
Pant writes in both Hindi and Kumaoni. She compiled regional oral traditions in the book Kumauni Lok Kathaen (Kumaoni Folktales). This text has been translated into English (as Folklores of Kumaon), Sanskrit, Nepali, and Rajasthani. It is also part of the folklore and culture studies curriculum at Indira Gandhi National Open University (IGNOU). Her Hindi fiction deals with the social conditions of rural and marginalized women. She has published story collections such as Meri Pratinidhi Kahaniyan and Faans. In 2024, she won the first Santosh Srivastava Katha Samman for her story collection Faans. She also wrote a biography of the British Gandhian social activist Catherine Mary Heilman, titled Karmayogi Sarla Behn. Published by the National Book Trust of India, this biography is cited in academic research on Gandhian activists, education, and ecofeminism in colonial India. Her children's literature includes poetry and story collections like Bacche Man Ke Sacche and Pari Hansavali. The latter was published by the Publications Division of the Ministry of Information & Broadcasting, Government of India.

== Selected works ==
Folklore, history, and biographies

- Karmayogi Sarla Behn (कर्मयोगी सरला बहन; Biography of Sarla Behn). National Book Trust of India, 2016.
- Kumauni Lok Kathaen (कुमाउनी लोक कथाएं; Kumaoni Folktales). New Delhi: Minal Education Books, 2017. ISBN 978-81-904363-7-3
- Uttarakhand Ki Lok Kathayen (उत्तराखंड की लोककथाएं; Folktales of Uttarakhand).
- Hum Aur Humara Kumaun (हम और हमारा कुमाऊँ; We and Our Kumaon).
- Folklores of Kumaon (English translation by Dinesh Kumar Mali). White Falcon Publishing, 2024. ISBN 979-8892223744

Fiction (Stories)

- Meri Pratinidhi Kahaniyan (मेरी प्रतिनिधि कहानियां; My Representative Stories). 2021. ISBN 978-81-949666-9-2
- Faans (फांस; The Noose).

Poetry

- Tera Tujhko Arpan (तेरा तुझको अर्पण; Yours is Dedicated to You).
- Main... (मैं...; I...).

Children's literature

- Pari Hansavali (परी हंसावली; The Fairy Hansavali). Publications Division, Ministry of Information & Broadcasting, 2014.
- Bacche Man Ke Sacche (बच्चे मन के सच्चे; Children are Pure of Heart).
- Bachpan Jeene Do (बचपन जीने दो; Let Childhood be Lived).

== Awards ==
- Santosh Srivastava Katha Samman (2024): Awarded by the Madhya Pradesh Rashtrabhasha Prachar Samiti and Hindi Bhavan Nyas for the story collection Faans.
- Gajanan Madhav Muktibodh Puraskar (2022): Awarded by the Madhya Pradesh Sahitya Academy for the story collection Meri Pratinidhi Kahaniyan.
- Shri Motilal Rathi Smriti Samman (2021): Awarded by Sahitya Mandal Shri Nathdwara, Rajasthan.
- Mahadevi Varma Puraskar (2018): Awarded by Samanvay, Allahabad.
- Pawas Samman (2018): Awarded by the Madhya Pradesh Rashtrabhasha Prachar Samiti.
- Acharya Narendra Dev Alankar (2015): Awarded by Acharya Narendra Dev Shikshanidhi, Nainital.
