= Diwan Singh Rawat =

Indian academic

Prof. Diwan Singh Rawat
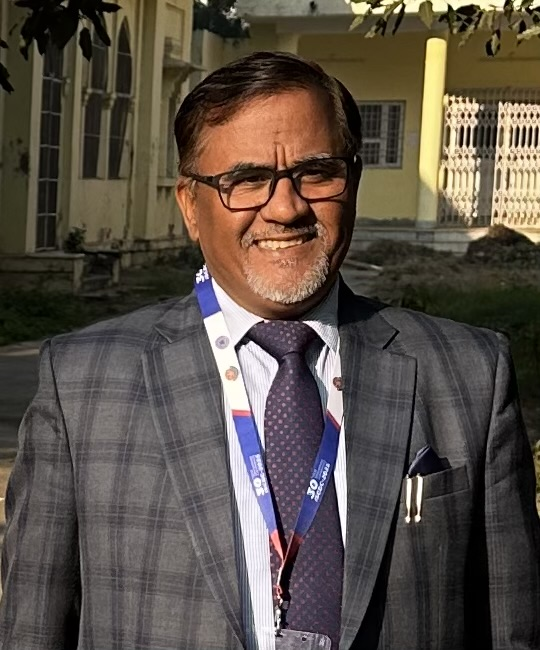
- Born: 1 January 1970 (age 56)
- Citizenship: Indian
- Education: Ph.D. in Medicinal Chemistry from Central Drug Research Institute, Lucknow.
- Occupations: Academic, Professor
- Employer: Kumaun University
- Title: Vice Chancellor, Kumaun University

Diwan Singh Rawat (born 1 January 1970) is an Indian academic and professor of chemistry, who served as the Vice Chancellor of Kumaun University, his alma mater, in Nainital from July 2023 till August 2026.

He is a Fellow of the Indian National Science Academy, National Academy of Sciences (FNASc) India, Fellow of the Royal Society of Chemistry (FRSC), and Chartered Chemist ( CChem) from London.

== Life and career ==
Diwan S Rawat was born in Uttarakhand. He pursued his master's degree from Kumaun University, Nainital, and Ph.D. in Medicinal Chemistry from the Central Drug Research Institute, Lucknow. Having worked for two years in the Pharmaceutical Industry in India, he moved to the USA where he completed his postdoctoral studies or research at Indiana University and Purdue University.

He is a professor in the Department of Chemistry at the University of Delhi. Previously, he worked as an assistant professor in the Department of Medicinal Chemistry, National Institute of Pharmaceutical Education and Research (NIPER), Mohali, Punjab, India. Prof Rawat is also a visiting professor at Japan Advanced Institute of Science and Technology (JAIST), Japan.

Professor Diwan S Rawat has contributed to the field of medicinal chemistry. He is known for his research on drug development of Parkinson's treatment.

He served as the associate editor of Scientific Reports (Nature Publisher), Journal of the Indian Chemical Society, and RSC Advances. He is on the editorial board of Anti-Cancer Agents in Medicinal Chemistry, Chemistry and Biology Interface, Marine Drugs, and other journals.

== Awards and Honors ==
- VASVIK Industrial Research Award in the category of Biological Sciences and Technology for his contribution to the synthesis of small organic molecules as potential drugs for the treatment of Parkinson's disease, cancer, and tuberculosis.
- Fellow of the Indian National Science Academy (INSA) (2025).
- Fellow of the National Academy of Sciences (FNASc), (2021)
- ISCB Excellence Award in Drug Research
