= THDC Institute of Hydropower Engineering and Technology =

Engineering college in Uttarakhand

- टीएचडीसी जल विद्युत अभियांत्रिकी और प्रौद्योगिकी संस्थान
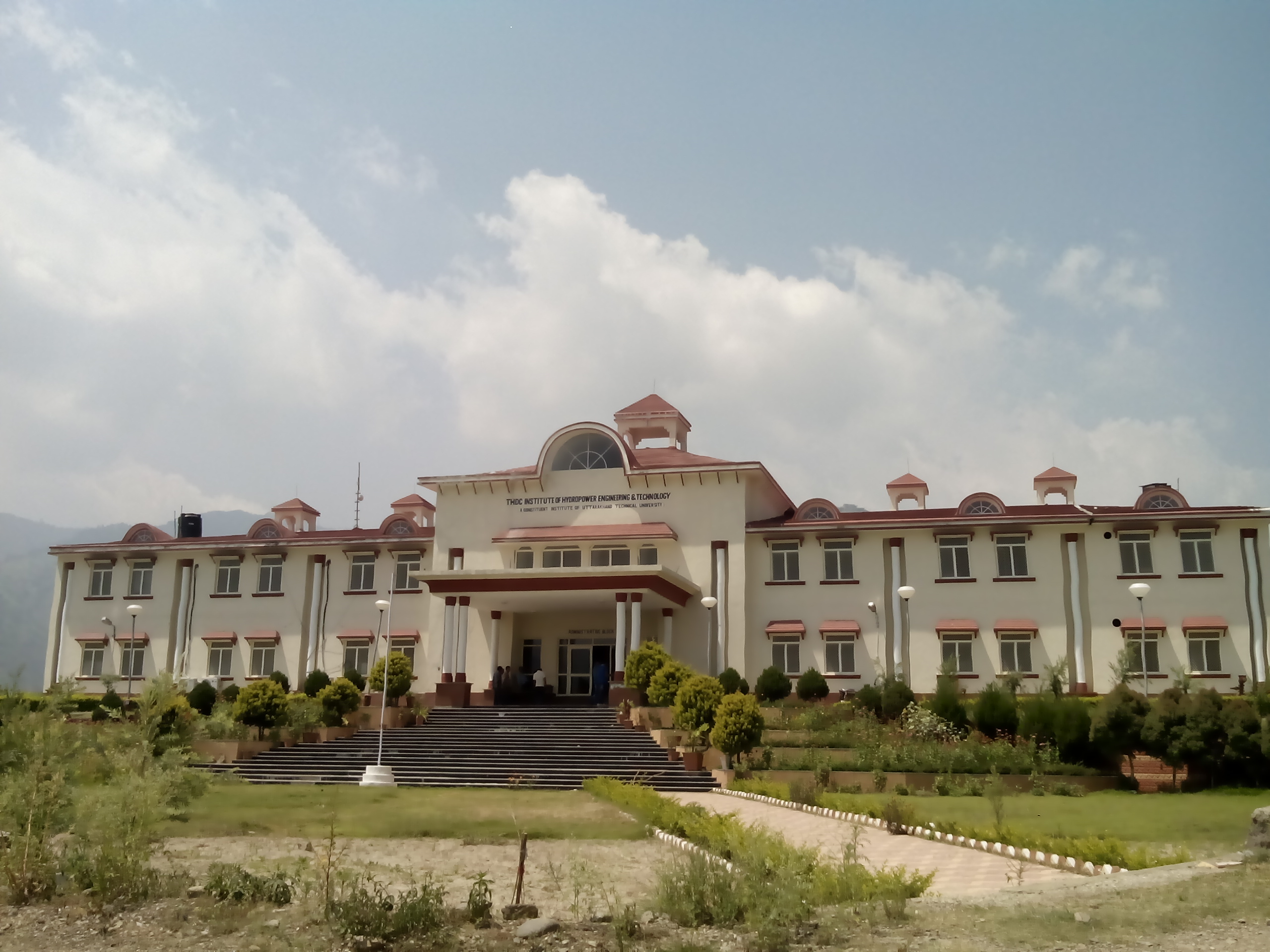
- Type: Government
- Established: 2011; 15 years ago
- Academic affiliations: Veer Madho Singh Bhandari Uttarakhand Technical University
- Director: Sharad Kumar Pradhan
- Location: New Tehri, Uttarakhand, India
- Campus: Rural
- Acronym: THDC IHET
- Location of THDC-IHET within Uttarakhand

THDC Institute of Hydropower Engineering and Technology is an engineering college in Bhagirathipuram, Tehri, Uttarakhand. The institute was established in August 2011 through a Memorandum of Understanding between THDC India Limited and Uttarakhand Technical University Dehradun as a constituent college of the university. The institute has been reconstituted as a Campus Institute of the Veer Madho Singh Bhandari Uttarakhand Technical University, Dehradun (erstwhile Uttarakhand Technical University) with effect from 9 May 2023.

THDC-IHET has initiated the THDC-IHET Research and Development Center to promote renewable energy innovation by teams of scientists and engineers from the institute and any other institutes affiliated to UTU.

The institute has received the award for "Excellent Institute for Promoting Hydropower in Uttarakhand" in the second National Uttarakhand Education Summit & Awards 2015 by CMAI Association of India.

Dr. Sharad Kumar Pradhan has been appointed as the new director of the institute. He has taken charge on 17 December 2022.

== Campus ==
The campus is in Bhagirathipuram, New Tehri and near the famous Tehri Dam, Uttarakhand. (The climate is cool throughout the year.)

The campus is in sprawling 40 acres of land, 14 km from New Tehri. THDC IHET on a 20 acre.

== Establishment ==
The institute was inaugurated by Sh. Sushilkumar Shinde, the then Minister of Power, in 2011.

== Recognition ==
All India Council for Technical Education accorded approval. The institute is affiliated with Uttarakhand Technical University, Dehradun.

== Academic departments ==
The institute offers regular B.Tech. degree program in the following disciplines:

- Civil Engineering
- Computer Science & Engineering
- Electrical Engineering
- Electronics & Communication Engineering
- Mechanical Engineering

== Admissions ==
The Bachelor of Technology admissions are based on UTU counselling (centralised counselling for colleges under Uttarakhand Technical University) and spot counselling conducted in the institute.

Students can take admissions on basis of either JEE (mains) result or 12th (PCM) results.

There are total of 120 seats in B.Tech. 1st year admissions in Computer Science branch and 65 seats in rest of the branches, 5 of which are reserved for Dam Affected or THDC ward.

B.Tech(Lateral Entry) admissions can be opted by diploma students by participating in UKSEE counselling.

== Activities ==
=== National Service Scheme ===
The National Service Scheme (NSS) is an Indian government sector public service program conducted by the Ministry of Youth Affairs and Sports of the Government of India. Popularly known as NSS, the scheme was launched in Gandhiji's Centenary year in 1969. Aimed at developing student's personality through community service, NSS is a voluntary association of young people in Colleges, Universities and at +2 level working for a campus-community (esp. Villages) linkage.

NSS is highly active in the campus conducting various cultural programs, blood donation camps, various awareness drives and many other events.

There are two units of NSS allotted to the college and they work under guidance of Mr. Nitin Kumar Gupta (Electrical Department).

=== Entrepreneurship Cell (E-Cell) ===
This club motivate and drive students to create and learn about startups. Here, students develop their ideas to solve various problems.

=== SAE India THDC-IHET CLUB ===
SAE India holds competitions every year for engineering students across the country.

- SUPRA SAEINDIA Student Formula
- Baja SAE India
- EFFI Cycle
- Aero Design
- Eco Kart

=== IEEE club ===
The IEEE's membership has long been composed of engineers and scientists. Allied professionals who are members include computer scientists, software developers, information technology professionals, physicists, and medical doctors, in addition to IEEE's electrical and electronics engineering core.

=== Escalade ===
Escalade was the mega inter-collegiate cultural fest of THDC-IHET, initiated in 2013, till 2015. Escalade promises fun, entertainment, gaming, singing, dancing, and many more. The highlights of the mega event of THDC-IHET are:

1. Zephyr – Intercollegiate Cultural Competition
2. Cresendo – The War of Bands
3. Akriti – The Art Fest
4. Fascino – The Fashion Event
5. Celeb Night
6. LAN Gaming
7. Inferno – The DJ Night

=== CIESZYC ===
CIESZYC is the mega inter-collegiate techno-cultural fest at THDC-IHET, initiated in 2018.
