= Tula's Institute =

Tulas University
- Type: Private and self-financing former college, now a university
- Established: 2006
- Affiliations: Affiliated to UGC UTU Dehradun. Certified by ISO 9001:2008 institute.
- Director: Prof Shailendra Kumar Tiwari
- Undergraduates: Yes
- Postgraduates: Yes
- Location: Dehradun, Uttarakhand, India
- Campus: Dhoolkot, PO-Selaqui, Chakrata Road, Dehradun, Uttarakhand
- Website: tulas.edu.in

Tulas University, formerly Tula's Institute, is a private and self-financing engineering and management college set up by the Rishabh Educational Trust in 2006. It is at Dehradun in Uttarakhand. It is an ISO 9001:2008 certified institute, offering bachelors and masters in technology, science, and business.

== Facilities ==
The college has single-sex student hostels, four male and two female, with a shared cafeteria.

The library is divided into digital, NPTEL and reference sections.

Its current programs include a "Microsoft Innovation Centre" and a "D-Link Academic Campus Connect Programme".

== Activities ==
The college features student clubs, committees, guest lectures and NCC programmes. Events include an annual "Sanskriti" festival, "Utkrisht" technical festival, workshops, and extracurricular activities.
