= Law College, Dehradun =

Indian law college

Coordinates: 42.378102°N 78.053246°E

- The seal of Law College Dehradun
- Motto: Dharm Sarv Pratistham धर्मः सर्वं प्रतिष्ठितम् (Sanskrit)
- Type: Law school
- Established: 2002; 23 years ago
- Accreditation: NAAC A+
- Affiliations: Bar Council of India; Uttaranchal University (Parent Institution)
- Dean: Rajesh Bahuguna
- Location: Dehradun, Uttarakhand, India
- Website: uudoon.in

Law College, Dehradun (popularly known as LCD) is one of the prestigious law school located in the city of Dehradun in north India state of Uttarakhand. It is the first independent law college in Uttarakhand. As a part of the faculty of Uttaranchal University, it has been accredited with Grade A+ by NAAC.

== Academics ==
It offers a three-year LLB program, five-year BA LLB, BBA LLB programs, an LLM program and Doctoral program in Law.

== Societies ==
The co-curricular component of academics is supplemented by a variety of activities organised by the College and University for law students through various Student Bodies. The organisation and execution of various events is delegated to the students.

Law College Dehradun/Department of Law:

- Legal Aid Centre (LAC)
- Alternative Dispute Resolution Center (ADRC)
- Rotaract Club (RC)
- Moot Court Society (MCS)
- Debating Society (DEBSOC)
- Youth Parliament Society (YPS)
- Vasundhara – The Green Society
- Cultural Society
- Sports Society
- Law College Old Students Association (LACOSA)

== Journal ==
=== Dehradun Law Review ===
The journal of Dehradun Law Review of Law College Dehradun, Uttaranchal University is a UGC Care journal, published a numerous academic research papers.

== Ranking ==
The law department has been ranked 5th under the Top 50 Law Colleges (Private) by the Indian Institutional Ranking Framework (IIRF) in 2024.

== See also ==
- List of law schools in India
