= Kanchan Pande =

Indian Isotope geologist, geochronologist and professor

- Born: 14 March 1958 (age 68); Uttaranchal, India
- Education: Kumaun University; Gujarat University
- Known for: Studies on the evolution of continental flood basalts in the Indian subcontinent
- Awards: 1989 INSA Indian National Science Academy; 2003 S. S. Bhatnagar Prize
- Scientific career
- Fields: Isotope geology; Geochronology
- Workplaces: Physical Research Laboratory; IIT Mumbai

Kanchan Pande (born 14 March 1958) is an Indian Isotope geologist, geochronologist and former professor at the department of earth sciences of the Indian Institute of Technology Mumbai. He is known for his studies on the evolution of continental flood basalts in the Indian subcontinent and is an elected fellow of the National Academy of Sciences, India. The Council of Scientific and Industrial Research, the apex agency of the Government of India for scientific research, awarded him the Shanti Swarup Bhatnagar Prize for Science and Technology, one of the highest Indian science awards for his contributions to Earth, Atmosphere, Ocean and Planetary Sciences in 2003. (Note: Long link - please select award year to see details)

== Biography ==
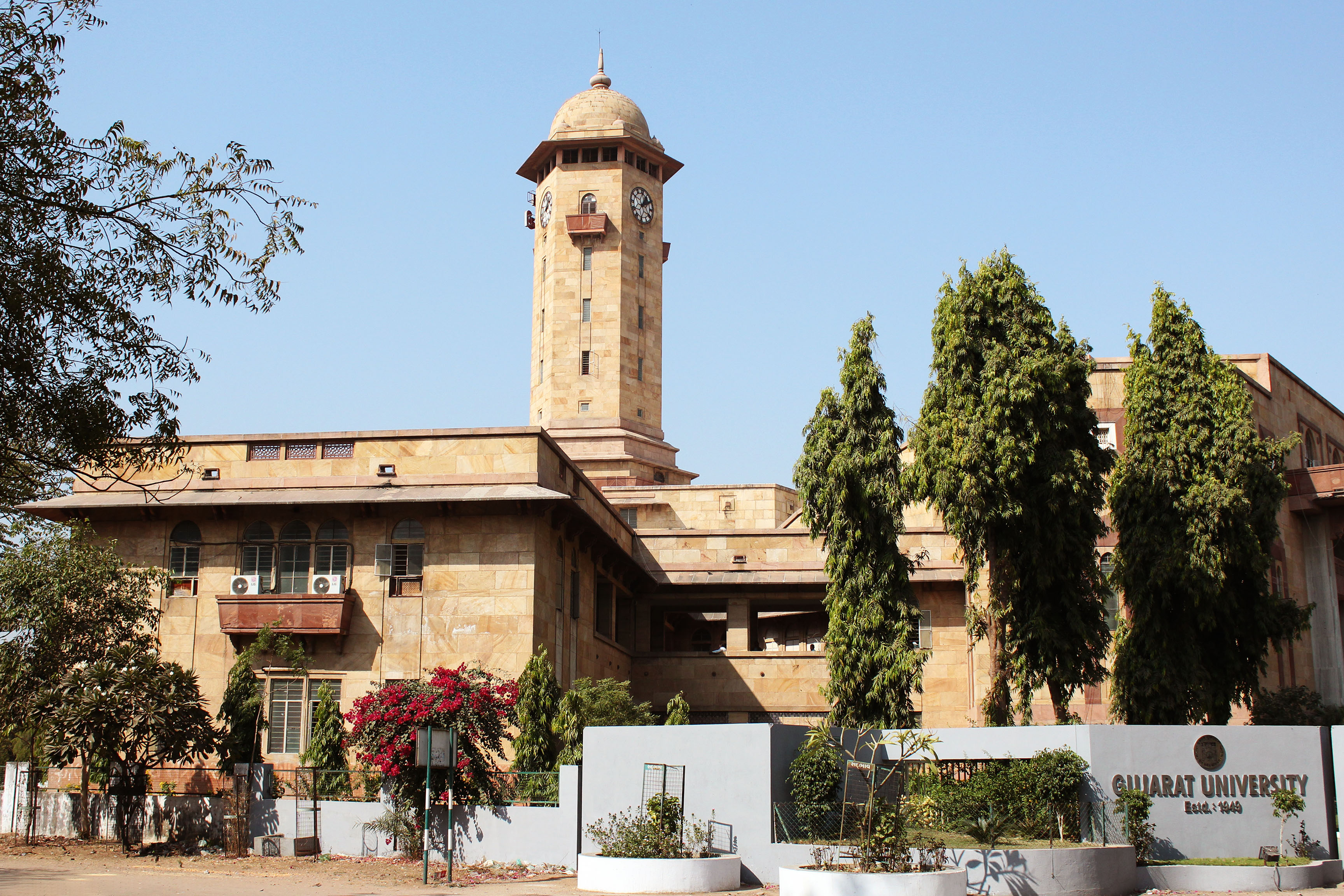
Gujarat University

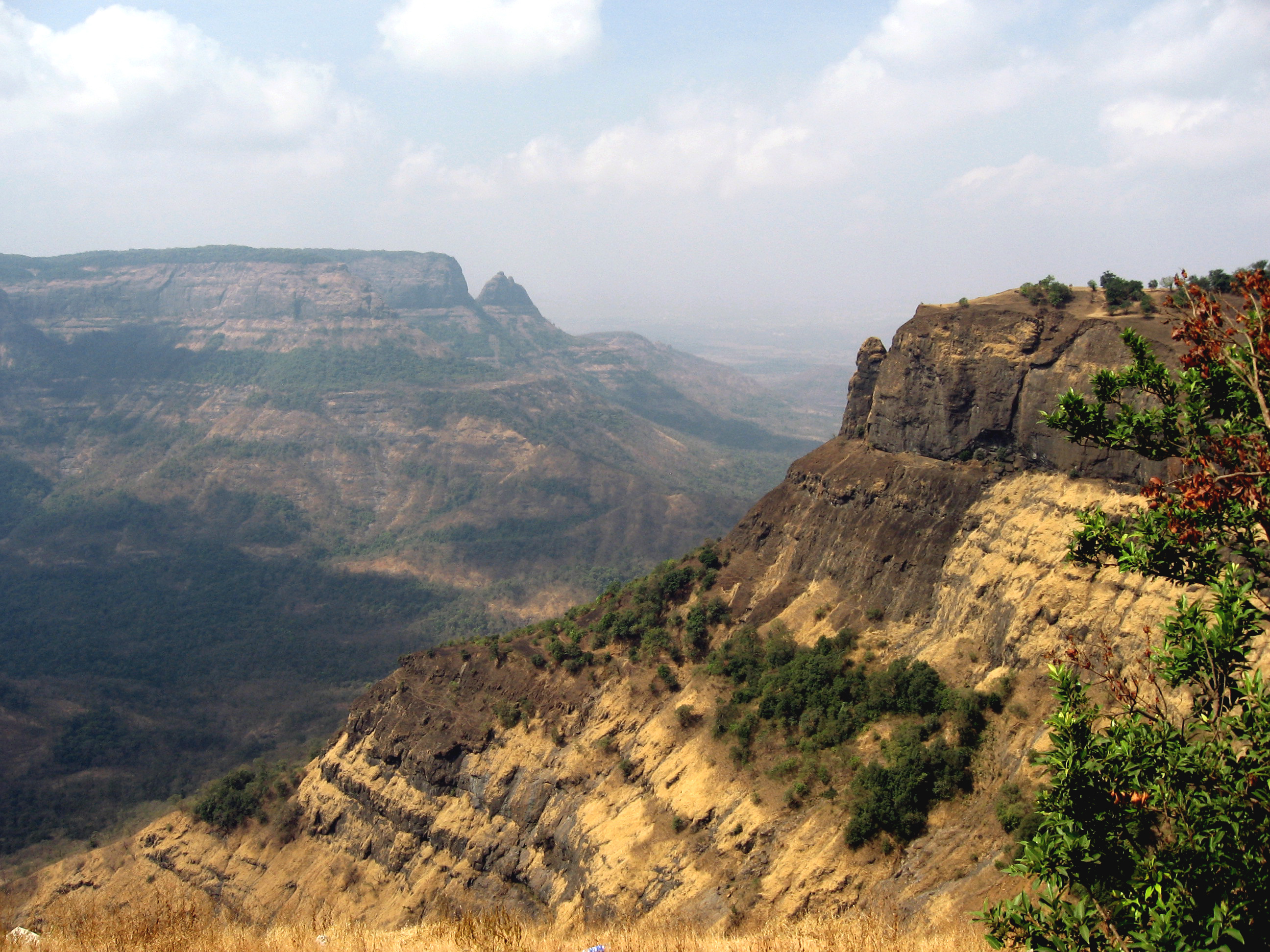
Deccan Traps

Kanchan Pande, born on 14 March 1958 in the Indian state of Uttaranchal, completed his master's degree in geology at Kumaun University in 1981 and secured PhD in Geochronology and Isotope geology from Gujarat University in 1990. His career started at Physical Research Laboratory in 1990 as a scientist (Grade D) and he held the position of an associate professor from 1998 to 2002 before becoming a professor in 2003. However, his service as a professor at PRL lasted only 5 months and in June 2003, he moved to the Indian Institute of Technology Mumbai as a professor at the department of earth sciences and retired from the post in March 2023.

Pande is known to have done extensive research on the geochronology of the region covering the Deccan Traps. His researches are reported to have assisted in understanding the geochronological constraints for the evolution of continental flood basalts in the Indian subcontinent and highlighted their geological and geochemical impact which has been detailed in an article, Age and duration of the Deccan Traps, India: A review of radiometric and paleomagnetic constraints, published in June 2002. His studies have been documented in several peer-reviewed articles; (Note: Please see Selected bibliography section) ResearchGate, an online repository of scientific articles, has listed 70 of them.

== Awards and honors ==
Pande, who was selected as Young Associate of the Indian Academy of Sciences in 1987, received the Young Scientist Medal of the Indian National Science Academy in 1989. The Council of Scientific and Industrial Research awarded him the Shanti Swarup Bhatnagar Prize, one of the highest Indian science awards in 2003. The National Academy of Sciences, India elected him as a fellow in 2015.

== Selected bibliography ==
- Jyotiranjan S, Ray Kanchan Pande, T. R. Venkatesan (March 2000). "Emplacement of Amba Dongar carbonatite-alkaline complex at Cretaceous/Tertiary boundary: Evidence from40Ar-39Ar chronology". Journal of Earth System Science. 109 (1): 39–47. doi:10.1007/BF02719147.
- Jyotiranjan S. Ray, Kanchan Pande, S. K. Pattanayak (2003). "Evolution of the Amba Dongar Carbonatite Complex: Constraints from 40Ar-39Ar Chronologies of the Inner Basalt and an Alkaline Plug". International Geology Review. 45 (9): 857–862. Bibcode:2003IGRv...45..857R. doi:10.2747/0020-6814.45.9.857. S2CID 129933424.
- Kanchan Pande, S. K. Pattanayak, K. V. Subbarao, P. Navaneethakrishnan, T. R. Venkatesan (December 2004). "40Ar-39Ar age of a lava flow from the Bhimashankar Formation, Giravali Ghat, Deccan Traps". Journal of Earth System Science. 113 (4): 755. Bibcode:2004InEPS.113..755P. doi:10.1007/BF02704034.
- Archisman Sen, Kanchan Pande, Hetu C. Sheth, Kamal Kant Sharma, Shraboni Sarkar, A. M. Dayal, Harish Mistry (December 2013). "An Ediacaran–Cambrian thermal imprint in Rajasthan, western India: Evidence from 40Ar–39Ar geochronology of the Sindreth volcanics". Journal of Earth System Science. 122 (6): 1477–1493. doi:10.1007/s12040-013-0359-y.
- Kanchan Pande (January 2015). "The Causal Link Between Deccan Flood Basalts and the Cretaceous Mass Extinctions: A Case of Unfounded Assumptions" (PDF). Workshop on Continental Crust and Cover Sequences in the Evolution of the Indian Sub-Continent.

== See also ==
- Large igneous province
