= Bhagwant Global University =

- Type: Private
- Established: 2016
- Chairman: Dr. Anil Singh
- Visitor: President of India
- Vice Chairperson: Dr. Asha Singh
- Location: Kotdwar, Pauri Garhwal,, Uttarakhand, India
- Website: Official website

Bhagwant Global University is a Private university located in Kotdwar, Pauri Garhwal district, Uttarakhand, India.
