= Maharaja Agrasen Himalayan Garhwal University =

Private university in Uttarakhand, India

Maharaja Agersen Himalayan Garhwal University
- Motto: gyanam teham savigyanamidam vakshyamyasheshateh
- Type: Private
- Established: 2016
- Chairman: Shiv Kumar Gupta
- Chancellor: Shiv Kumar Gupta
- Vice-Chancellor: Dr. Nand Kishor Sinha
- Location: Dhair Gaon, Pokhra Block, Pauri Garhwal district,, Uttarakhand, India; 29°54′22″N 78°54′25″E
- Website: Official website
- Location within Uttarakhand Location within India

Maharaja Agrasen Himalayan Garhwal University (abbreviated as MAHGU; formerly Himalayan Garhwal University) is an Indian private university located in Pauri Garhwal district, Uttarakhand. MAHGU was established vide the Act No. 33 of 2016 of Uttarakhand Legislative Assembly.

== Courses offered ==
The university offers several undergraduate and postgraduate level courses and programs in science, arts, engineering, IT, management, law, design, etc. including doctoral programs in the same.

== Awards ==
- Awarded Best University in North India for Industry Interface 2022 (CEGR).
- Awarded with title "Best University for Hilly Region 2022" for outstanding contribution to Education, Skill and Research by India International Centre, New Delhi during 6th National Excellence Award Ceremony 2022 on 30 July 2022.
- Mr. Shiv Kumar Gupta, Chairman of Maharaja Agrasen Himalayan Garhwal University, as he is recognized at the prestigious Jagran Achiever Awards held on 27 August 2022 in Singapore (NCR).
