= National Institute of Technology, Uttarakhand =

Engineering institute in Uttarakhand, India

- Other name: NIT-UK
- Motto: Abhyasadhyarayetah Vidya
- Motto in English: Knowledge is maintained through Practice and Hardship
- Type: Public technical university
- Established: 2009; 17 years ago
- Chairman: Vivek Lall
- Director: Karunesh Kumar Shukla (I/C)
- Undergraduates: 495
- Postgraduates: 25
- Doctoral students: 144
- Location: NH7, Srinagar, Uttarakhand, India; 30.2184°N 78.7668°E
- Campus: Urban
- Language: English
- Website: www.nituk.ac.in

The National Institute of Technology Uttarakhand (NIT- Uttarakhand or NIT-UK) is a public technical university in the Indian state of Uttarakhand. It was founded in 2009, as one of the 10 new National Institutes of Technology in India, and is recognised as an Institute of National Importance under The National Institutes Of Technology (Amendment) Act, 2012. It admitted its first batch of students in 2010–11.

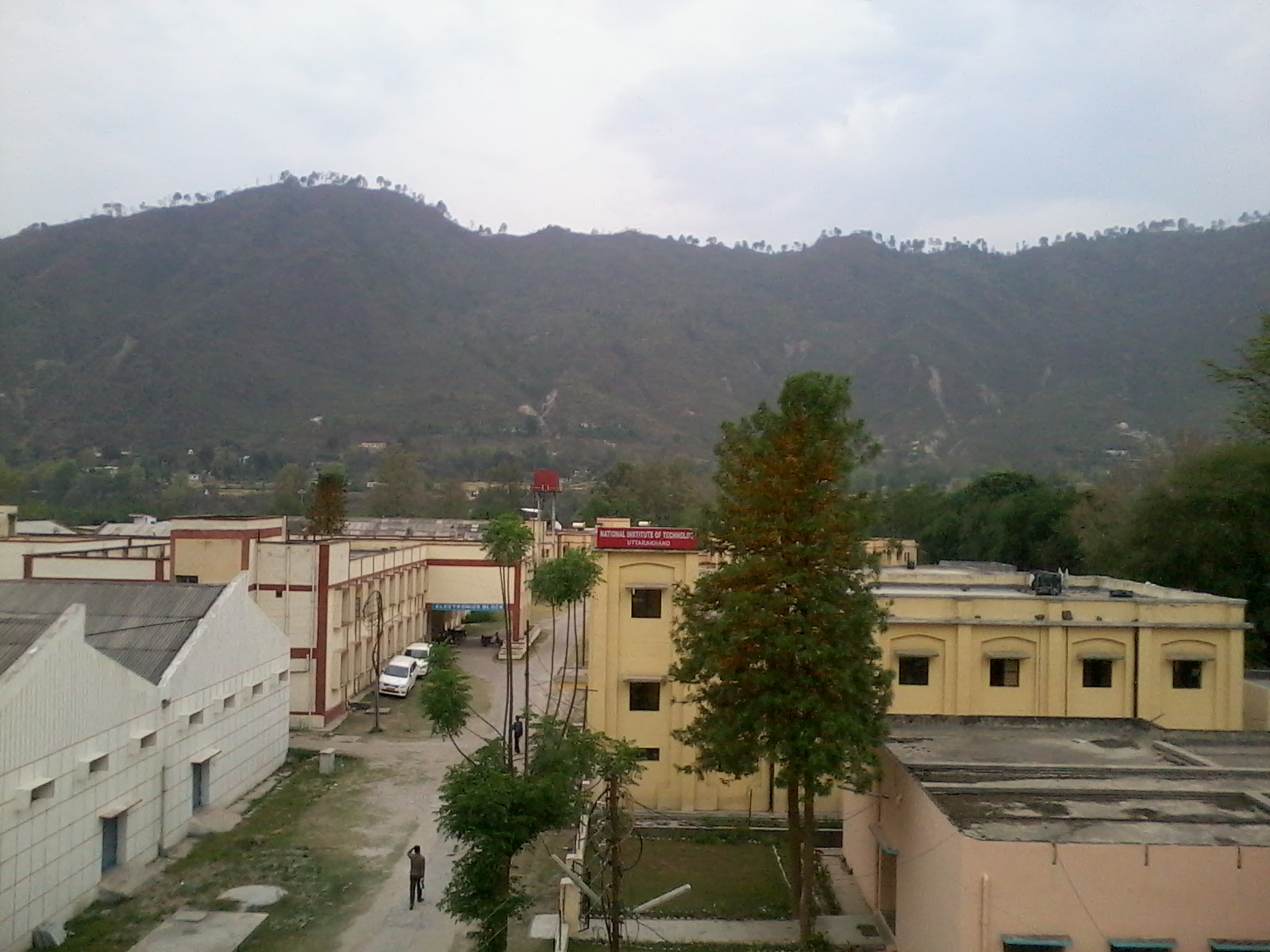
Aerial view of the Temporary Campus

The Srinagar campus is, Srinagar, Uttarakhand, Pauri Garhwal district.

== Academics ==
=== Ranking ===
University rankings

Engineering – India
- NIRF (2023): 129
- NIRF (2024): 131

Architecture – India
- NIRF (2023): Rank-band: 101-150

NIT, Uttarakhand is Rank-band: 101-150 among the engineering colleges of India by National Institutional Ranking Framework (NIRF) in 2023.

== Admissions ==
Since 2013, the Bachelor of Technology admissions for Indian students were taken through JEE Main The B.Tech. admissions for foreign students are done through Direct Admission of Students Abroad (DASA) Scheme.

For admissions to M.Tech./M.Arch./M.Plan. programs, one has to qualify GATE exam and then has to undergo CCMT (Centralized Counselling for M.Tech./M.Arch./M.Plan. Admissions).

== Campus ==
The institute is currently operating from temporary campus located at Srinagar (Garhwal), Uttarakhand. The permanent campus is being built at Sumari, Uttarakhand.

== Courses offered ==
The university offers degrees in Sciences & Humanities (2010), Computer Science engineering (2010), Electrical and Electronic engineering (2010), Electronics and Communication Engineering (2010), Mechanical Engineering (2012) and Civil Engineering (2013).

== See also ==
- National Institute of Technology
- Education in India
- National Institute of Technology Delhi
- National Institute of Technology Silchar
