= Institute of Technology Gopeshwar =

Engineering institute in Uttarakhand, India

Institute of Technology, Gopeshwar
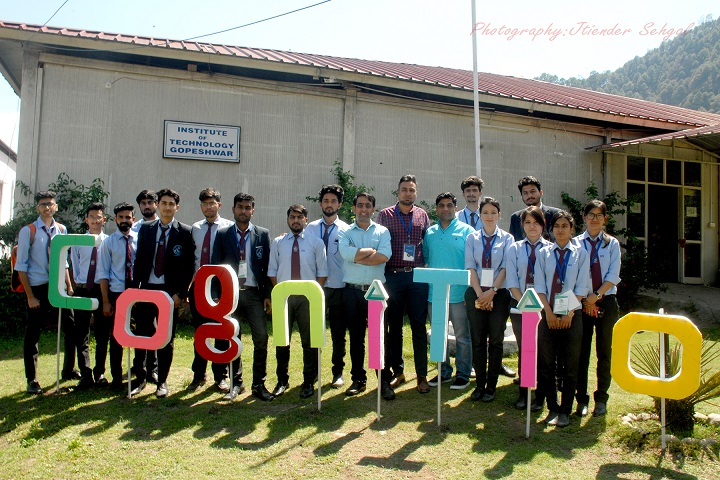
- Other name: ITG
- Motto: ज्ञानं विज्ञानम् सहितम्
- Type: Public
- Established: 2013
- Affiliations: Veer Madho Singh Bhandari Uttarakhand Technological University, AICTE
- Vice-Chancellor: Onkar Singh
- Director: Dr. Amit Agarwal
- Undergraduates: 240 (annual intake)
- Location: Chamoli Gopeshwar, Uttarakhand; 22.170968°N 86.60781°E
- Campus: Kothiyalsain village Chamoli Gopeshwar (Permanent)
- Website: itgopeshwar.ac.in

Institute of Technology Gopeshwar is a government-run engineering institute in Chamoli Gopeshwar, Uttarakhand, India. It was established in 2013 as a campus institute Veer Madho Singh Bhandari Uttarakhand Technological University. The institute was established by the Government of Uttarakhand and Uttarakhand Technical University as a campus institute of the university. The institution has been reconstituted as Campus Institute of Veer Madho Singh Bhandari Uttarakhand Technical University (erstwhile Uttarakhand Technical University), Dehradun with effect from 9 May 2023.

The Institute of Technology (IT) Gopeshwar was founded by the Uttarakhand Technical University and the Department of Technical Education, Uttarakhand Government under Uttarakhand Technical University Act. 2005. This Institute is among the six campus institutions of Veer Madho Singh Bhandari Uttarakhand Technological University (UTU), Dehradun all of which have been reconstituted as Campus Institute of the VMSB Uttarakhand Technical University, Dehradun. These institutions fulfill the objective of the Government of Uttarakhand to promote awareness of technical education among socially and economically weaker sections of society. Since its founding in 2013, IT Gopeshwar has operated on a self-financed model.

== Student life ==
=== Campus ===
The institute has permanent campus situated in Kothiyalsain (8 km (5.0 mi) from main town Chamoli Gopeshwar).

=== Labs ===
The institute has labs for each department.

=== Center for Innovation, Design and Startups ===
Institute established a Center for Innovation, Design and Startup, that helps the students to work in the direction of problem-solving approaches, which in turn polish the ability of problem-solving approaches that results in identifying the opportunity to run it as a startup. The centre is equipped with, 3D printing, 3D scanner, Laser Engraving and cutting tool machine, along with component lab that consists of about over 1000 components that can be used by the students for different innovative projects.

FB PAGE: IIC Institute of Technology Gopeshwar

=== Placements ===
Few companies come for placement due to its remote location. For placements, students usually travel to other institutes for pool placements.

=== Medical Facility ===
One Visiting doctor regularly visit the Institute for two hours 2.30 to 4.30 pm.

== Technical Education quality improvement program ==
Institute is funded by TEQIP-III project (A world bank Project).

== Departments ==
The Institute has 7 Departments for 5 Engineering disciplines which are as follows-:

- Department of Mechanical Engineering
- Department of Computer Science and Engineering
- Department of Electrical Engineering
- Department of Electronics and Communications Engineering
- Department of Civil Engineering
- Department of BCA
- Applied Science

== Undergraduate courses (B.Tech)/Graduation Degree ==
| Stream | No of seats |
|---|---|
| Computer Science & Engineering | 120 |
| Electronics & Communication Engineering | 30 |
| Mechanical Engineering | 30 |
| Civil Engineering | 60 |
| Electrical Engineering | 30 |
| Bachelor of computer Application | 60 |

== Recent Events Organized and Participated ==
=== IIMT Covid Kavach Ideathon 2020 ===
Institute of Technology Gopeshwar stood second in the Innovation Competition for developing a vaccine protection and transport system. Researchers from CSIR stood first. A national level competition was organized by IIMT Meerut under the banner of Ministry of Small and Medium Enterprises (MSME) from 1 to 5 June, in which dozens of technical institutes & organizations from all over the country including IIT's NIT's & CSIR had participated. VPATS (Vaccine Preservation and Transportation System) was developed by Undergrads of Institute of Technology Gopeshwar, which finished second in the competition. Under the direction of HOD Mechanical Mr. Hemant Singh Chauhan, Akshay Kumar Sahni, a student of Mechanical engineering, has designed this innovation in collaboration with his colleague Rachita Chaudhary.
