= Shri Guru Ram Rai University =

Private university in Uttarakhand, India

- Motto: Quest For Excellence
- Type: Private University
- Established: 2017
- Accreditation: UGC, ICAR, NMC, INC, PCI, NCTE, State Paramedical Council
- President: Mahant Devendra Dass Ji Maharaj
- Vice-Chancellor: Prof. Dr. K. Prathapan
- Location: Dehradun, Uttarakhand, India
- Campus: 82.5 acres
- Website: www.sgrru.ac.in

Shri Guru Ram Rai University is a private university established under Guru Ram Rai Darbar Sahib and the leadership of Mahant Devendra Dass Maharaj and it is recognised by UGC, under section 2(f) of the act UGC Act 1956. Located in Dehradun, Uttarakhand, India, it is spread over 82.5 acres of land with a total building area of 230,886 square metres.
