= Ras Bihari Bose Subharti University =

- Type: Private
- Established: 2016; 10 years ago
- Chancellor: Governor of Uttarakhand
- Vice-Chancellor: Dr. Himanshu Aeran
- President: Dr. Atul Krishna
- Location: Dehradun, Uttarakhand, India
- Website: Official website

Ras Bihari Bose Subharti University is a Private university located in Dehradun, Uttarakhand, India.
