= Veer Madho Singh Bhandari Uttarakhand Technical University =

Public university in Uttarakhand, India

Coordinates: 30.3435°N 77.9400°E

- Former name: Uttarakhand Technical University
- Type: Public
- Established: January 27, 2005; 21 years ago
- Affiliations: UGC, AICTE, PCI, BCI
- Chancellor: Governor of Uttarakhand
- Vice-Chancellor: Onkar Singh
- Location: Dehradun, Uttarakhand, India
- Website: www.uktech.ac.in

Veer Madho Singh Bhandari Uttarakhand Technical University is a public university in the Indian state of Uttarakhand set up by the Government of Uttarakhand on 27 January 2005, through the Uttarakhand Technical University Act 2005. It has 6 campus institutes and 80 affiliated colleges Government and Private). 6 campus institutes are in the university campuses at Dehradun, Tehri, Tanakpur, Gopeshwar, Pithoragarh, and Uttarkashi spread all over the state.

== Departments and faculties ==
- Architecture
- Business Management
- Mechanical Engineering
- Civil Engineering
- Chemical Engineering
- Electrical Engineering
- Electronics & Communication Engineering
- Computer Science and Engineering
- Industrial & Production Engineering
- Biotech Engineering
- Engineering and Technology
- Hotel Management and Catering Technology
- Pharmacy
- Law
- Power System Engineering

== Affiliated colleges and institutes ==
The university has been established in an area of 8.372 hectares and it is the only affiliating University of the state for technical institutions. There are 6 campus Institutes and 75 affiliated colleges with 23,000 students in courses mentioned below:

Bachelor of Technology (B.Tech.)
Bachelor of Pharmacy (B.Pharm.)
Bachelor of Hotel Management and Catering Technology (BHMCT)
Bachelor of Business Administration (BBA)
Master of Business Administration (MBA)
Bachelor of Computer Application (BCA)
Master of Computer Application (MCA)
Master of Pharmacy (M.Pharm.)
Master of Technology (M.Tech.)
Pharm. D.
BALLB
BBALLB
LLB
LLM
Faculty of Management offering two M.B.A. full time and one M.B.A. Part Time in University Campus
Faculty of Pharmacy offering B.Pharm. and two M.Pharm. in University Campus
Faculty of Technology two B. Tech. and five M.Tech. in University Campus
Professional courses

The university imparts education in graduate, postgraduate, and doctorate programs in disciplines like Management, Engineering, Hotel Management, Computer Application, Pharmacy, Law, along with others.

It serves technical education through its undergraduate, postgraduate, and doctoral programs that are compliant with the National Education Policy 2020. It offers a choice-based credit system, multiple entry/exit options, and majors with or without minor degree options in almost all programs. The university also runs the Women's Institute of Technology on its campus in Dehradun, focusing on classroom and laboratory activities alongside project-based learning. The university runs the faculty of management, pharmacy, and technology in its campus, apart from its 6 campus institutes. It aims to spread technical education in remote and underprivileged areas of the Uttarakhand hills through its six campus institutions.

1. THDC Institute of Hydropower Engineering and Technology, New Tehri
2. Seemant Institute of Technology, Pithoragarh
3. Women Institute of Technology, Dehradun
4. Institute of Technology Gopeshwar, Gopeshwar
5. Dr APJ Abdul Kalam Institute of Technology, Tanakpur (Champawat)
6. Institute of Technology, Baun, Uttarkashi
7. Institute of Technology, Salt, Almora (proposed)

The program-wise intake in 2023-24 was, B.Tech.-7296, B.Pharm-1880, BHMCT-365, Law-2285, MBA-2197, M.Tech.-587, M.Pharm.-232, MCA-288, Pharm.D.-30. BBA and BCA have been started from 2024-25 session.
