= Uttaranchal University =

Indian University

- Motto: For the Excellence Within "U"
- Type: Private research university
- Established: 2013
- Founder: Jitender Joshi (President)
- Accreditation: NAAC A+
- Affiliations: UGC; AIU; NAAC
- Vice-Chancellor: Professor Dharam Buddhi
- Location: Dehradun, Uttarakhand, India
- Campus: over 70 acres (28 ha); Urban
- Website: uudoon.in

Uttaranchal University campus

Uttaranchal University is a state private university located at Dehradun, Uttarakhand, India near Indian Military Academy. It was established by an Act of the Uttarakhand Legislative Assembly under Smt Shushila Devi education foundation.

== Academic profile ==
The Uttaranchal University has been recognized by the UGC under sections 2(f) and 12(B) of the UGC Act, 1956. The university is made up of several faculties and departments. The departments are governed by statutes and regulations promulgated by the University Grants Commission, Government of India.

== Awards ==
- 'Uttarakhand Udai Ratna': Awarded by Amar Ujala.
- 'The Amar Ujala Achievers' Award': Conferred upon the university.
- 'Best Law College' Award: Law College Dehradun received this accolade from Divya Himgiri.
- 'Best Private University' Award: Bestowed by Divya Himgiri.
- 'Jagran Excellence Award': Presented by the Jagran Prakashan Group.

=== Accreditation ===
Uttaranchal University has been also accredited with NAAC Grade A+, NIRF

== Constituent Colleges ==
- Law College Dehradun (LCD)
- Uttaranchal Institute of Technology (UIT)
- Uttaranchal Institute of Management (UIM)
- Uttaranchal Institute of Pharmaceutical Sciences (UIPS)
- School of Applied & Life Sciences (SALS)
- School of Agriculture (SOA)
- School of Liberal Arts (SLA)/Mass Communication
- Uttaranchal College of Nursing (UCN)
- Uttaranchal School of Computing Science (USCS)
- Uttaranchal School of Hotel & Hospitality Management (USHHM)
- Uttaranchal College of Health Sciences (UCHS)
- Uttaranchal College of Online & Distance Education (UCODE)
