= Soban Singh Jeena University =

State university in Uttarakhand, India

Coordinates: 29.5919406°N 79.6458561°E

Soban Singh Jeena University, Almora
- Former name: SSJ Campus
- Type: State University
- Established: 2020; 6 years ago
- Affiliations: UGC
- Chancellor: Governor of Uttarakhand
- Vice-Chancellor: Satpal Singh Bisht
- Location: Almora, Uttarakhand, India
- Campus: Urban
- Website: ssju.ac.in

Soban Singh Jeena University (SSJ University) is a state university situated at Almora, Uttarakhand, India. The university was established in 2020 under the Soban Singh Jeena University Act, 2019 (Uttrakhand Act No. 19 of 2020), which was approved by the cabinet of Uttarakhand in October 2019. The university started operation in August 2020 when Prof. Narendra Singh Bhandari, the founder Vice-Chancellor of the university, assumed his position.

The university has four campuses affiliated to it :-

1. Soban Singh Jeena Campus, Almora
2. Laxman Singh Mahar Campus, Pithoragarh
3. Pt. Badri Dutt Pandey Campus, Bageshwar
4. Champawat Campus, Champawat

Both the Pithoragarh and Bageshwar campuses were established in 2020 with the separation of SSJ University from Kumaun University and the Champawat campus was established in 2022.
