= Sri Dev Suman Uttarakhand University =

Indian State University

- Type: State University
- Established: 2012; 14 years ago
- Affiliations: UGC
- Chancellor: Governor of Uttarakhand
- Vice-Chancellor: Ambrish Mahajan
- Location: Badshahithaul, Tehri Garhwal, Uttarakhand, India
- Campus: Rural
- Website: www.sdsuv.ac.in

Sri Dev Suman Uttarakhand University (SDSUV) is a State university situated at Badshahithaul in Tehri Garhwal district of north Indian state of Uttarakhand, India. It was established by the Government of Uttarakhand through Pt. Deen Dayal Upadhyay Uttarakhand Vishwavidhyalaya Act, 2011 and its amendment through Pt. Deen Dayal Upadhyay Uttarakhand Vishwavidhyalaya (Amendment) Ordinance, 2012 which changed the name of the institute.
