= All India Survey on Higher Education =

All India Survey on Higher Education (AISHE) was started in India in 2010–11. A task force was formed constitution representatives from education ministry, University Grants Commission, All India Council of Technical Education, National Medical Commission, National University of Education Planning and Administration, Distance Education Council of India and representatives of many universities.

Task force recommended survey making an annual exercise which was accepted and now it is a regular survey being conducted by department of Higher Education in ministry of education, India.

Each institution is allotted a code known as AISHE code, There are about 50000 Institutes of Higher Education in India, out of this about 800 are universities, 12,000 are professional institutes and remaining academic colleges and institutes. In survey, Data is collected about details of Institute, Students enrolled, no. and details of teachers, infrastructure available, scholarship, loans and accreditation etc.
