= Motiram Baburam Government Post Graduate College =

State public college in Haldwani, Uttarakhand, India

- Other names: MBGPG College, MBPG College
- Former name: Lala Moti Ram Babu Ram Degree College (1960–1982)
- Motto: स्वकर्म निरतः सिद्धिं
- Motto in English: Success through devotion to one's duty
- Type: Public government college
- Established: July 1960; 66 years ago
- Parent institution: Department of Higher Education, Government of Uttarakhand
- Accreditation: NAAC (Grade 'B')
- Religious affiliation: Nonsectarian
- Academic affiliations: Kumaun University, UGC
- Principal: Dr. Narendra Singh Bankoti
- Academic staff: 136 (2024–2025)
- Students: 13,786 (2024–2025)
- Undergraduates: 10,884
- Postgraduates: 2,845
- Doctoral students: 57
- Location: Nainital Road, Haldwani, Nainital district, Uttarakhand, 263139, India; 29.230278°N 79.531149°E
- Campus: 5 acres (2.0 ha); Urban
- Language: Hindi, English
- AISHE code: C-21891
- Colors: Navy blue, red, and gold
- Website: Official website

- Location in Uttarakhand

Motiram Baburam Government Post Graduate College (MBGPG College) is a public state college located in Haldwani, Nainital district, Uttarakhand, India.

Founded in 1960, MBGPG is affiliated with Kumaun University and recognized by the University Grants Commission (UGC). With an enrollment of 13,266 students as of 2024, it is the largest degree college in the Kumaon region.

== History ==
=== Founding and early years (1960–1982) ===
The college was established in July 1960 with financial support and land donated by the Moti Ram Babu Ram Educational Trust, founded by local businessman Babu Ram. It initially operated as a private institution under the name Lala Moti Ram Babu Ram Degree College, and was listed in the Ministry of Education's 1965 Directory of Institutions for Higher Education.

The institution was initially affiliated with Agra University. When Kumaun University was established in Nainital in 1974, the college's affiliation was transferred to the new university. In 1982, the Government of Uttar Pradesh assumed control of the college from the private educational trust, provincialising the institution as a fully state-funded and managed college. (Note: At the time of provincialisation in 1982, Haldwani was part of Uttar Pradesh. The college transitioned under the jurisdiction of the Department of Higher Education, Government of Uttarakhand, upon the creation of the new state in November 2000.)

=== Post-provincialisation and 21st century (1982–present) ===
Following the formation of Uttarakhand in November 2000, administrative control passed to the state Department of Higher Education.

In 2003, the state government introduced the "Shikhar" Project at the college in partnership with Aptech, adding a computer training centre to offer technical courses alongside regular degree studies. (Note: The Shikhar Project was a state-sponsored information technology initiative implemented across government colleges in Uttarakhand to provide subsidised vocational computing courses alongside standard university degrees.)

During the 2004–2005 academic session, the state government designated the college an Ideal College and a Vishishta Mahavidyalaya (Distinguished College) for Nainital district. (Note: The twin designations of Vishishta Mahavidyalaya (Distinguished College) and Ideal College were instituted by the Uttarakhand Department of Higher Education to recognise leading multi-faculty colleges in each district, prioritising them for state development funding, faculty expansion, and postgraduate laboratory upgrades.)

In May 2017, historical human remains and traditional burial structures were discovered during civic foundational groundwork in Gaulapar, Haldwani. Faculty members from the college Department of History, including assistant professor H. S. Bhakuni, assisted local authorities with archaeological documentation and historical records. (Note: Department faculty assisted in contextualising regional historical records, while forensic faculty at Dr. Sushila Tiwari Government Medical College assisted administrative authorities with scientific dating.)

In December 2022, the student body elected its first female student union president in the college's history.

In 2023, the college facilities were inspected by a delegation from the Asian Development Bank (ADB) to evaluate the institution for infrastructure development as a state model college. (Note: Under the state "Model College" modernisation framework, large regional colleges are evaluated in partnership with development agencies like the Asian Development Bank (ADB) to receive targeted funding for advanced research laboratories, digital smart classrooms, and infrastructure capacity to handle growing student enrolments.) To accommodate student numbers, the state government introduced a cluster framework sharing faculty and laboratory facilities between MBGPG College and Indira Priyadarshini Government Girls PG College.

Effective from the 2025–2026 academic session, the college implemented the Four-Year Undergraduate Programme framework under the National Education Policy 2020, following Kumaun University ordinances that replaced the earlier three-year degree system. (Note: Undergraduate degree courses (B.A., B.Sc., and B.Com.) at the college operated as three-year programmes until the formal implementation of the Four-Year Undergraduate Programme (FYUP) framework in the 2025–2026 academic session under Kumaun University ordinances, which introduced multiple exit certifications and a fourth-year curriculum for Honours and Research degrees.)

== College grounds and facilities ==
The college's 5-acre (2.0 ha) grounds are situated in central Haldwani along the Nainital Road arterial corridor, bordered by local commercial and administrative zones. Designed primarily for commuter students, the grounds comprise interconnected multistory academic blocks, departmental laboratories, the central administrative wing, and open-air recreational fields.

=== Academic facilities and library ===
Academic infrastructure includes departmental lecture halls, science laboratories, a STEM laboratory for vocational training, an Intellectual Property Rights (IPR) Cell, and a multi-purpose academic building. The central library is funded by the UGC and the state government. It holds approximately 1,50,000 documents, including 1,30,000 general accession books and 20,000 volumes in a dedicated Book Bank for students from economically weaker sections. Through the INFLIBNET Centre N-LIST programme, the library provides electronic access to over 6,000 journals and 1,99,500 e-books. Adjacent to the main collection is the Vachanalaya (Reading Hall), which maintains 850 reference books and 42 journals for students preparing for competitive civil service examinations.

=== Museum (Dharohar) ===
Near the Commerce block is the college museum, named Dharohar (Heritage), inaugurated by the Uttarakhand Higher Education Minister. The museum preserves cultural, historical, and ecological items from Uttarakhand. Displays include wooden temple architectural carvings, indigenous folk musical instruments, traditional farming equipment, and visual records of regional flora, fauna, and local communities including the Tharu, Jaunsari, and Bhotiya.

== Academics ==
=== Degree programmes and departments ===
The college follows a semester system across two terms (July–December and January–June), offering 21 undergraduate and 19 postgraduate degree programmes across four academic faculties. It serves secondary school graduates from across Nainital, Almora, and Champawat districts. Academic instruction is organised across 25 departments within four faculties. The Faculty of Arts comprises 13 departments: Drawing and Painting, Economics, English, Geography, Hindi, History, Home Science, Music, Political Science, Psychology, Sanskrit, Sociology, and Tourism. The Faculty of Science encompasses 11 departments offering instruction in basic and applied sciences: Biotechnology, Botany, Chemistry, Computer Science, Forestry, Geology, Information Technology, Mathematics, Physics, Statistics, and Zoology. The Faculty of Commerce provides undergraduate and postgraduate business instruction through Bachelor of Commerce (B.Com., general and honours) and Master of Commerce (M.Com.) curricula. The Faculty of Education conducts teacher preparation through the Bachelor of Education (B.Ed.) programme.

=== Curriculum and examination structure ===
Undergraduate courses operate under the Four-Year Undergraduate Programme framework of the National Education Policy 2020. Students take 22 credits per semester across Discipline Specific Core subjects (12 credits), Generic Electives (4 credits), Ability Enhancement language courses (2 credits), Value-Added environmental courses (2 credits), and vocational Skill Enhancement Courses (2 credits) in subjects such as computer applications and mushroom cultivation. Exit certifications are available at each stage: an undergraduate certificate after one year (44 credits), a diploma after two years (88 credits), a bachelor's degree after three years (132 credits), and a bachelor's degree with honours or research after four years (176 credits). (Note: Under the Kumaun University National Education Policy ordinances, students who exit with a certificate or diploma retain the option to re-enter within a specified duration to complete their bachelor's degree, with earned credits stored digitally in the national Academic Bank of Credits (ABC).) Postgraduate education includes Master of Arts (M.A.), Master of Science (M.Sc.), and Master of Commerce (M.Com.) degrees. Doctoral research programmes leading to the Doctor of Philosophy (Ph.D.) degree are conducted under Kumaun University research ordinances in physics, chemistry, botany, and zoology. Academic evaluation uses Continuous Comprehensive Evaluation, consisting of 25 percent internal continuous assessment and 75 percent end-semester university examinations. According to the All India Survey on Higher Education (AISHE code: C-21891), the college had 136 appointed teaching faculty during the 2024–2025 session, giving a student-to-teacher ratio of 101:1.

Academic programme enrolment by faculty (2024–2025)
Faculty or division	Male students	Female students	Total enrolment	Female share (%)
Faculty of Arts	2,923	4,817	7,740	62.2%
Faculty of Science	1,352	1,792	3,144	57.0%
Faculty of Commerce	1,444	938	2,382	39.4%
Vocational & professional programmes	112	311	423	73.5%
Doctoral research (Ph.D.)	22	35	57	61.4%
Total college enrolment	5,853	7,893	13,746	57.4%

=== Admissions and student demographics ===
Student enrolment profile (2024–2025)
Three-year enrolment trends
Academic session		Total headcount	
2022–2023		11,559	
2023–2024		12,525	
2024–2025		13,786 (Note: While total admissions for the 2024–2025 session reached 13,786 across all streams, regular categorised degree enrolment stood at 13,746 students.)	
Demographic distribution
Category	Male	Female	Share (%)
General	3,942	5,121	65.9%
Scheduled Caste	1,229	1,547	20.2%
Other Backward Classes	523	1,037	11.3%
Scheduled Tribe	159	188	2.5%
Total	5,853	7,893	100.0%

Admissions are processed online through the Uttarakhand State Higher Education Admission Portal on the Samarth platform. Applicants register with Kumaun University and establish an Academic Bank of Credits or APAAR digital identifier. The college also hosts regional study centres for Uttarakhand Open University (Centre 16034) and Indira Gandhi National Open University (Centre 2711) for distance-education students. (Note: Total college academic engagement exceeds 15,000 learners when accounting for distance-learning registrations through the on-site Uttarakhand Open University and IGNOU study centres.) Undergraduate selection is based on Class 12 examination merit. The college implements statutory state quotas:

- Scheduled Castes (SC): 19%
- Scheduled Tribes (ST): 4%
- Other Backward Classes (OBC): 14%
- Economically Weaker Sections (EWS): 10%
- Women domiciled in Uttarakhand: 30% horizontal quota applied across all categories. (Note: The 30 percent horizontal reservation for female candidates domiciled in Uttarakhand is mandated by the Uttarakhand Public Services (Horizontal Reservation for Women) Act, 2022, ensuring female representation across all vertical caste quotas.)

Candidates with certificates in the National Cadet Corps (NCC), National Service Scheme (NSS), or recognized sports receive merit weightage points. Financial aid is offered through central and state scholarship programmes, including Post-Matric Scholarships for reserved categories, the Central Sector Scheme for university students, and the state's Mukhyamantri Uchh Shiksha Protsahan Yojana. (Note: Under the Mukhyamantri Uchh Shiksha Protsahan Yojana, the Directorate of Higher Education provides monthly financial stipends to students in government colleges who achieve top qualifying marks in university annual and semester examinations.) Doctoral admissions are conducted through Kumaun University's Research Degree Entrance Test (RDET) and interviews.

== Student life ==
With an enrollment of nearly 14,000 regular and vocational students, Motiram Baburam Government Post Graduate College supports the largest student population in the Kumaon region.

=== Student union and politics ===
The college serves as a center for student representation and civic engagement in eastern Uttarakhand. Annual student union elections (Chhatra Sangh Chunav) are conducted under the recommendations of the Lyngdoh Committee, featuring participation from major student organizations including the Akhil Bharatiya Vidyarthi Parishad (ABVP), the National Students' Union of India (NSUI), and the All India Students Association (AISA). The elected union executive represents the student body across institutional and welfare forums, comprising the posts of President, Vice President, General Secretary, Joint Secretary, and University Representatives.

Electoral campaigns involve active campus debates and candidate forums, with local administrative authorities coordinating security oversight during polling and counting sessions to maintain campus order. In December 2022, the student body achieved a notable milestone in female leadership with the election of a female student union president for the first time in the college's history. (Note: The December 2022 election marked the first time a female candidate won the presidency of the student union since the institution's founding in 1960.)

=== Civic and cultural activities ===
The student body maintains long-standing traditions of civic engagement and local philanthropy in Haldwani, organizing community welfare drives, disaster relief assistance, and healthcare aid for underprivileged families in Nainital district.

The college functions as a regional center for the preservation of Kumaoni cultural traditions, organizing seasonal folk festivals, literary symposia, and musical programmes. Key annual observances include Phagotsav, celebrated through traditional musical gatherings, Shakunakhar, featuring auspicious regional folk songs, and the annual Basant poetry recitations highlighting Kumaoni and Hindi literature. (Note: Phagotsav ([pʰɑːɡoːt̪səʋ]) is the traditional celebration of classical Kumaoni musical Holi, while Shakunakhar ([ʃəkʊnɑːkʰər]) refers to ceremonial blessing songs indigenous to the folk heritage of Kumaon.)

=== Extracurricular organizations ===
The college maintains chapters of several state and national youth organizations. It hosts active Army and Air wings of the National Cadet Corps (NCC). The Army wing operates a 150-seat boys' unit (B/78 UK COY) and a 55-seat girls' unit (24 UK Girls BN), while the Air wing (1 UK NCC Air Wing) accommodates 100 cadets. The curriculum includes basic military training, shooting, map reading, drone operational training, and leadership seminars. In alignment with the National Education Policy 2020, NCC training is formally integrated as a credited skill enhancement course. Top-performing cadets are routinely selected to represent Uttarakhand at the Republic Day Camp (RDC) in New Delhi and the national Thal Sainik Camp (TSC). The college's NCC leadership has also been recognized at the highest levels, with unit officers receiving the Director General (DG) Commendation Card for exemplary dedication to cadet development.

Through the National Service Scheme (NSS), student volunteers participate in community service projects across five designated college units. Regular NSS initiatives include blood donation drives, health awareness programmes, environmental cleanliness campaigns in support of Swachh Bharat Mission (SBM), and outreach visits to local eldercare facilities.

Additionally, the college operates Rovers and Rangers scouting units, with an enrolled capacity of 24 male and 24 female students. These units promote outdoor leadership and community development, with cadets regularly participating in state-level Rover and Ranger meets.

=== Student support and placement ===
The college operates institutional frameworks dedicated to student career development, vocational guidance, and entrepreneurship. The Career Counselling and Placement Cell facilitates recruitment drives, interview preparation, and employment counseling for graduating students. In collaboration with the Entrepreneurship Development Institute of India and the state Department of Higher Education, the college implements the Devbhoomi Udyamita Yojana (Devbhoomi Entrepreneurship Scheme), functioning as a nodal incubation center offering startup workshops, enterprise mentoring, and business development training. (Note: The Devbhoomi Udyamita Yojana is a statewide collegiate entrepreneurship initiative conducted in partnership with the Entrepreneurship Development Institute of India to provide students in Uttarakhand government colleges with business incubation and self-employment training.)

Student welfare and health services include the Mental Health and Counselling Cell, established as the first dedicated collegiate mental wellness unit in Uttarakhand to provide psychological counselling and academic stress management. The college also maintains an Anti-Drug Committee in conjunction with state public health directives to promote substance abuse prevention and peer wellness.

Statutory governance and institutional safety are administered through specialized regulatory committees. These include an Anti-Ragging Cell operating under UGC safety guidelines, a Grievance Redressal Cell for academic and administrative appeals, and an Internal Complaints Committee constituted under the Sexual Harassment of Women at Workplace (Prevention, Prohibition and Redressal) Act, 2013. Further student support bodies include an SC/ST Cell overseeing statutory social safeguards, a Legal Literacy and Aid Cell coordinated with district legal authorities, a Right to Information (RTI) Cell, and a compliance committee enforcing the Uttarakhand Right to Service Act.

=== Sports ===
The college maintains a dedicated sports department. Outdoor sports facilities support hockey, football, cricket, volleyball, basketball, kabaddi, kho-kho, boxing, and track and field athletics. Indoor facilities are available for badminton, table tennis, carom, and chess. College athletic teams regularly compete in inter-collegiate championships, securing victories in regional athletics, kho-kho, and chess tournaments. Students also compete in martial arts, winning university judo matches and qualifying for national jiu-jitsu events. Student welfare infrastructure includes sanitary pad vending machines installed for female students.

== People ==
=== Faculty and staff ===
As a state-funded institution, the faculty and administrative staff of Motiram Baburam Government Post Graduate College are appointed through the Uttarakhand Public Service Commission and the state's Department of Higher Education. Faculty members are responsible for conducting undergraduate and postgraduate lectures, supervising doctoral dissertations, and engaging in original academic research. Administrative operations and institutional reporting are supported by the Internal Quality Assurance Cell (IQAC) under the leadership of the college principal.

To accommodate the large volume of enrollments across its catchment area, the institution operates with a high student-to-teacher ratio. During the 2023–2024 academic year, the student-to-faculty ratio was recorded at approximately 96:1, which increased to 101:1 during the 2024–2025 academic year as overall enrollment continued to expand.

Faculty members have been recognized regionally for their contributions to higher education, literature, and civic leadership. The faculty includes academics such as Prabha Pant, a recognized Hindi author, poet, and Head of the college's Hindi Department, who was awarded the Gajanan Madhav Muktibodh Award by the Madhya Pradesh Sahitya Akademi. Other personnel have received honours such as the HDD Achievement Award for excellence in quality education, and faculty officers overseeing the National Cadet Corps (NCC) units have been formally awarded for excellence in cadet leadership.

In addition to their teaching duties, senior faculty members frequently serve in administrative and proctorial capacities for Kumaun University. This includes overseeing and hosting massive regional examinations on campus, such as the university's Research Degree Entrance Test (RDET) for Ph.D. candidates and the joint B.Ed. entrance examinations.

=== Notable alumni ===
- Prashant Singh Rawat – Indian professional basketball player; represented the national team at the 2022 FIBA Asia Cup.

== See also ==
- Kumaun University
