= Kumaun University =

State public university in Nainital, Uttarakhand, India

- Official emblem of Kumaun University
- Motto: सर्व ज्ञाने परिसमाप्यते
- Motto in English: Everything culminates in knowledge
- Type: Public state university
- Established: 23 November 1973; 52 years ago
- Affiliations: UGC, AIU, NAAC ('A' Grade)
- Chancellor: Governor of Uttarakhand
- Vice-Chancellor: Satpal Singh Bisht
- Students: ~150,000+ (including affiliated colleges)
- Location: Nainital, Uttarakhand, India; 29.38301°N 79.45891°E
- Campus: Multi-campus (Nainital, Bhimtal, Patwadangar) 160 acres (65 ha)
- Website: www.kunainital.ac.in

Kumaun University (KU) is a public state university headquartered in Nainital, Uttarakhand, India. Established in 1973 under the Uttar Pradesh State Universities Act, it was founded to decentralize higher education and cater to the mountainous Kumaon region of the state. The university offers undergraduate, postgraduate, and doctoral programs across eight primary faculties and serves as the affiliating body for over 109+ government and private colleges, supporting a total student population of approximately 150,000.

The university operates through three primary constituent campuses: the central Dev Singh Bisht (DSB) Campus in Nainital, the Sir J.C. Bose Technical Campus in Bhimtal, and the newly established Meru Campus in Patwadangar. Historically, the university's academic jurisdiction covered the entirety of the Kumaon division. However, following a major state legislative restructuring in 2020, its Almora campus was elevated into the independent Soban Singh Jeena University (SSJU). Consequently, Kumaun University's current jurisdiction is concentrated primarily on the districts of Nainital and Udham Singh Nagar.

Kumaun University is recognized by the UGC and is accredited with an 'A' Grade by the National Assessment and Accreditation Council (NAAC). It houses several prominent research facilities, including a UGC Centre of Advanced Studies in Physics and the regional Himalaya Museum. As of recent evaluations, the institution ranks 25th nationally among government universities in the 2026 India Today survey and placed 73rd in India in the 2025 National Institutional Ranking Framework (NIRF) for Pharmacy.

== History ==
=== Formation and early years ===
Kumaun University was established in 1973 under the Uttar Pradesh State Universities Act (Act No. 10), concurrently with Garhwal University, to decentralize higher education and cater to the mountainous regions of then-Uttar Pradesh. The university was formed by merging two prominent pre-existing institutions: the Dev Singh Bisht (D.S.B.) Government P.G. College in Nainital (established in 1951) and the Almora Government P.G. College. These two colleges functioned as the founding constituent campuses of the newly minted university.

=== 2020 bifurcation ===
In 2020, the Government of Uttarakhand passed legislation (SSJ University Act No. 20 of 2019, notified in June 2020) to restructure higher education in the state. The act elevated Kumaun University's Almora campus into an independent state university named Soban Singh Jeena University (SSJU). As a result of this bifurcation, the affiliation of all degree colleges located in the districts of Almora, Bageshwar, Champawat, and Pithoragarh was officially transferred from Kumaun University to SSJU.

=== Recent developments ===
In 2015, the university was accredited with an 'A' Grade status by the National Assessment and Accreditation Council (NAAC).

In 2017, it hosted the first Kautik Student Film Festival.

In October 2025, India Post released a special commemorative postal cover honoring Kumaun University's half-century contribution to Himalayan education. The following month, the President of India, Droupadi Murmu, presided over the university's convocation ceremony as the chief guest. In May 2026, the state government laid the foundation stone for the university's third educational campus, the Meru Campus, at Patwadangar, spanning 26.4 acres under the MERU DST grant.

== Campus ==
Kumaun University's 160-acre (65 ha) campus network is primarily situated in Nainital, Bhimtal, and Patwadangar, located in the Kumaon division of Uttarakhand. The university is situated in the undulating terrain of the Himalayan foothills, surrounded by a subtropical highland climate characterized by cool summers and cold winters. The surrounding environment consists of rich mountain ecosystems populated by native Himalayan flora, including deodar trees, shrubs, and herbs, which support the institution's environmental, geological, and ecological research activities.

In its early years, Kumaun University was established by consolidating pre-existing state educational institutions, notably the D.S.B. Government College in Nainital, which had been operational since 1951. The development of the university's primary infrastructure was guided by the natural topography of the region, featuring stone masonry, pitched roofs, and structures that blend with the surrounding mountain landscape. Over time, modern academic blocks and scientific laboratories were added to expand research capacity, resulting in a blend of historic heritage and contemporary functional architecture.

The university operates across a built-up area of 300,000 square metres (3,200,000 sq ft). It is formally organized into three main constituent campuses: the historic Dev Singh Bisht (DSB) Campus in Nainital, focusing on humanities, social sciences, and basic sciences; the Sir J.C. Bose Technical Campus in Bhimtal, dedicated to technical, pharmaceutical, and managerial studies; and the newly established Meru Campus in Patwadangar, which serves as a multidisciplinary research and innovation hub.

=== DSB Campus, Nainital ===
The Dev Singh Bisht (DSB) Campus, located in the Ayarpatta area of Nainital (colloquially known as Sleepy Hollow), serves as the central administrative and academic headquarters of Kumaun University. Originally established as a government college in 1951, it was integrated into the university upon its founding in 1973.

Integrated into the mountain terrain, the DSB campus contains specialized laboratories for physics and chemistry, lecture halls, auditoriums, residential student hostels, and a central university library. The Hermitage complex, a notable heritage building on the campus grounds, houses the Human Resource Development Centre (HRDC), the Devdar Auditorium, and university guest quarters.

The campus also features the Himalaya Museum, established in 1987. The museum is dedicated to preserving the archaeological, cultural, and historical heritage of the Uttarakhand region. Its collection includes ancient sculpture fragments, coins from the Kushana period, traditional Kumaoni folk instruments, historic manuscripts, and regional textiles.

=== Sir J.C. Bose Technical Campus, Bhimtal ===
To accommodate expanding professional and technical programs, the university established the Sir J.C. Bose Technical Campus in the satellite town of Bhimtal, Uttarakhand, located approximately 22 kilometres (14 mi) southeast of Nainital. Founded in 1997, it serves as the university's primary center for professional studies, housing the Department of Management Studies (DMS) and the Department of Pharmaceutical Sciences.

The Bhimtal campus is situated on Block Road and features specialized department libraries, computer centers, research laboratories, and residential hostels for male and female students. Programs operating at the site hold recognition from national statutory bodies, including the All India Council for Technical Education (AICTE) and the Pharmacy Council of India.

=== Meru Campus, Patwadangar ===
Located in Patwadangar, the Meru Campus is the university's third and newest educational facility. Following the clearance of the proposed site in April 2026, it is currently being developed on a 26.4-acre (10.7 ha) tract of land. The campus is being constructed under the central government's PM-USHA MERU (Multidisciplinary Education and Research University) scheme, backed by a ₹100 crore project grant. The foundation stone for the campus was officially laid in May 2026 by Uttarakhand's Higher Education Minister, Dr. Dhan Singh Rawat.

The Meru Campus is designed to be a modern multidisciplinary hub, with initial infrastructure comprising two state-of-the-art academic blocks. Its academic focus is explicitly centered on high-level research, biotechnology, modern sciences, innovation, and supporting regional startups. Additionally, the campus will host specialized initiatives dedicated to the study of Himalayan medicinal plants and wellness lifestyles, aiming to provide employment-oriented education and global academic recognition to the region's youth.

== Affiliated colleges ==
Kumaun University's collegiate network functions as the academic affiliating body for over 100 higher education institutions. Historically, the university's academic jurisdiction covered the entirety of the Kumaon division in Uttarakhand. However, following a major state legislative restructuring in 2020, its Almora campus was elevated to form the independent Soban Singh Jeena University (SSJU). Consequently, the affiliation of all degree colleges located in the districts of Almora, Bageshwar, Champawat, and Pithoragarh was officially transferred to SSJU. Today, Kumaun University's jurisdiction is concentrated primarily on the districts of Nainital and Udham Singh Nagar.

This educational ecosystem is structurally divided into state-funded government colleges and self-financed private or government-aided institutes, bridging the academic divide between the state's urban plains and its rural foothills.

In its early years, higher education in the region was anchored by a handful of pioneering institutions that predated the university's formal establishment. The oldest affiliated public institution, the Motiram Baburam Government Post Graduate College (MBGPG College) in Haldwani, was established in 1960. To accommodate growing regional enrollment, the network expanded over the following decades. Key administrative and industrial centers gained dedicated postgraduate colleges, including the Radhehari Government Postgraduate College in Kashipur in 1969, and the P. N. G. Government Postgraduate College in Ramnagar in 1975. Recent state initiatives aimed at inclusive education have continued to add modern facilities to the network, including a Government Degree College in Kichha in 2019 and a dedicated Government Women's Degree College in Jaspur in 2020.

=== Private and professional institutes ===
The private and professional wing of the university comprises numerous non-government institutions, which are heavily concentrated in the industrial and commercial hubs of Udham Singh Nagar and Nainital. These facilities primarily focus on applied sciences, business administration, legal studies, and teacher training. The origins of the private network trace back to 1995 with the founding of the government-aided Chandrawati Tiwari Girls Postgraduate College in Kashipur and the self-financed Ganna Krishak Girls College in Kichha.

The early 2000s marked a rapid proliferation of professional institutes designed to meet the demands of modern industries. Prominent additions to the network included the Amrapali Institute of Applied Sciences in Haldwani (1999), Chanakya Law College in Rudrapur (2003), and the Satyendra Chandra Gudiya Institute of Management Technology in Kashipur (2005). Later construction incorporated highly specialized niche disciplines, resulting in the establishment of the Renaissance College of Hotel Management in 2010, Gyanarthi Media College in 2015, and MIET Kumaun Engineering College in 2016. The network also features several teacher-training academies, anchored by established institutions such as the Inspiration College of Teachers Education and various colleges operating under the Devbhoomi and Drona educational trusts.

== Administration and organization ==
Kumaun University is a state public university governed by the Uttar Pradesh State Universities Act of 1973 (as adopted and modified by the Government of Uttarakhand). As a state university, the Governor of Uttarakhand serves as the ex officio Chancellor, acting as the ceremonial head of the institution.

The day-to-day operations and executive leadership are managed by the Vice-Chancellor, who is appointed by the Chancellor. The administrative framework is supported by the Registrar, the Finance Officer, and the Controller of Examinations. The university's highest decision-making body is the Executive Council, which oversees major policy decisions, while the Academic Council is responsible for maintaining educational standards, syllabi, and examination regulations. Student welfare, discipline, and campus activities are supervised by the Dean of Student Welfare (DSW) and a centralized proctorial board.

== Research and facilities ==
Kumaun University is recognized for its research contributions, particularly in disciplines related to Himalayan ecology, geology, and pharmaceutical sciences. The institution is supported by major national funding agencies, including the University Grants Commission (UGC), the Department of Science and Technology (DST), and the Council of Scientific and Industrial Research (CSIR).

The university's academic infrastructure is anchored by the Central Library at the DSB Campus, which houses an extensive repository of reference books, historical manuscripts, national and international journals, and an expanding digital library network (INFLIBNET) accessible to scholars. Additionally, each academic department maintains its own specialized departmental library.

A key academic facility is the UGC-Human Resource Development Centre (HRDC), located within the Hermitage complex in Nainital. The HRDC is tasked with enhancing the pedagogical skills of higher education faculty across the state by conducting regular orientation programs, refresher courses, and short-term interdisciplinary training workshops. The university also houses an EDUSAT center to facilitate distance learning and tele-education.

== Student life ==
Kumaun University facilitates various co-curricular and extracurricular programs designed to foster student development and community engagement. The university maintains active units of the National Cadet Corps (NCC) and the National Service Scheme (NSS). Student volunteers frequently participate in blood donation camps, environmental awareness drives, disaster relief programs, and cleanliness campaigns in the surrounding hill communities. The university also supports the Rovers and Rangers program.

Student representation is active across the campuses, facilitated by the Student Union. Annual democratic elections are held for executive positions (such as President, Vice-President, and Secretary), allowing students to engage directly in university politics and advocate for student welfare issues.

The institution promotes athletic development through its sports directorate. Facilities are provided for a variety of indoor and outdoor sports, including basketball, table tennis, track and field, boxing, and martial arts. University teams frequently compete and place in inter-university and national-level tournaments, particularly in boxing and athletics.

== Rankings ==
University rankings

Pharmacy – India
- NIRF (2022): 61
- NIRF (2023): 64
- NIRF (2024): 62

Kumaun University has been recognized by national and international ranking frameworks for its academic output, particularly in specialized scientific disciplines. In 2015, the university was accredited with an 'A' Grade status by the National Assessment and Accreditation Council (NAAC).

The National Institutional Ranking Framework (NIRF) consistently ranks the university's Department of Pharmaceutical Sciences among the top pharmacy institutions in India. The department was ranked 61st in 2022, 64th in 2023, and 62nd in 2024.

Internationally, Kumaun University was placed in the 901–950 rank band in the QS Asian University Rankings. Within the QS Southern Asia sub-category for the same evaluation cycle, the university was ranked 297th.

== Faculties ==
1. Faculty of Arts (Drawing and Painting, Economics, English, Geography, Hindi, History, Home Science, Music, Political Science, Psychology, Sanskrit, Sociology and Tourism)

2. Faculty of Science (Botany, Forestry, Chemistry, Computer Science, Geology. Mathematics, Physics, Statistics, Zoology, Biotechnology, Information Technology and G.I. Science)

3. Faculty of Commerce (B.Com., B.Com.(Hon.), M.Com.)

4. Faculty of Management (BBA, MBA, P.G. Diploma in Tourism, MBA in Tourism, MBA Executive, MBA Rural Management)

5. Faculty of Education (B. Ed. and M. Ed.)

6. Faculty of Law (LL.B. and LL.M.)

7. Faculty of Technology (B. Pharma, and M. Pharma.)

8. Faculty of Visual Arts (B.F.A. and M.F.A.)

== UGC-Academic Staff College ==
The UGC-Academic Staff College, Kumaun University, Nainital was sanctioned by the UGC, New Delhi on 10 October 2006 and started its first orientation programme on 12 February 2007. In addition to conducting orientation programmes and refresher courses, the UGC-ASC undertakes a number of extension activities.

UGC-ASC Nainital conducted short-term courses (2–6 days) for the senior faculty and professional development programme for non-teaching staff.

== Notable alumni ==
- Rajesh Singh Adhikari, Indian Army officer and posthumous recipient of the Maha Vir Chakra.
- Bhagat Singh Koshyari, former Governor of Maharashtra and former Chief Minister of Uttarakhand.
- Shekhar Pathak, historian, academician, and Padma Shri recipient.
- Kanchan Pande, isotope geochemist and Shanti Swarup Bhatnagar Prize laureate.
- Neelesh Misra, journalist, author, and radio storyteller.
- Ekta Bisht, Indian international cricketer.
- Sunita Rajwar, film, television, and stage actress.
- Diwan Singh Rawat, organic chemist and Vice-Chancellor of Kumaun University.
- Kashi Singh Airy, Indian politician and prominent leader of the Uttarakhand Kranti Dal
- Bipin Chandra Tripathi, founding member of the Uttarakhand Kranti Dal
