= IMS Unison University =

Private university in Dehradun, Uttarakhand, India

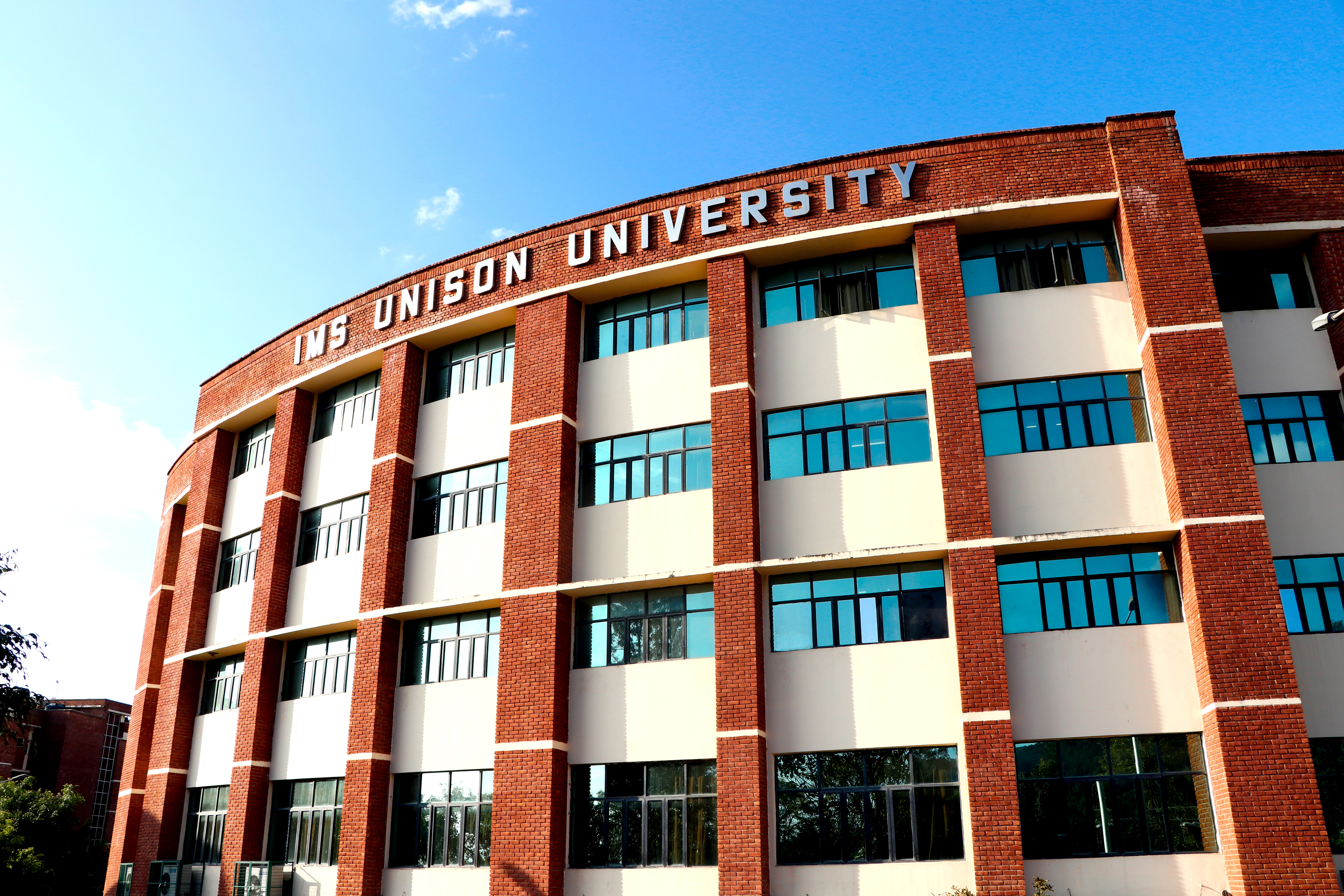
- Former name: Institute of Management Studies
- Motto: Nurturing Knowledge. Empowering Minds.
- Type: Private
- Established: 2013
- Parent institution: Unison Group
- Affiliations: UGC, BCI, AIU
- President: Amit Agarwal
- Vice-Chancellor: Dr. Anil SubbaRao Paila
- Location: Dehradun, Uttarakhand, India; 30°24′00″N 78°04′41″E
- Campus: Urban
- Language: English
- Website: iuu.ac

- Location within Uttarakhand Location within India

IMS Unison University (IUU), formerly Institute of Management Studies, is a private university located in Dehradun, Uttarakhand, India. It offers academic programs at undergraduate, postgraduate, and doctoral levels in different streams of management, mass communication, law, hospitality management, and liberal arts.

== Academics ==
It offers academic programs at undergraduate, postgraduate, and doctoral levels in different streams through its five schools: Click on Programs.

- School of Management & Liberal Arts
- School of Law
- School of Media and Communication Design
- School of Hospitality Management
- School of Computer Application

=== Affiliations ===
Like all private universities in India, IMS Unison University is recognized and approved by the University Grants Commission. Law Programs are approved by the Bar Council of India (BCI).Bar Council Approval IUU is a member the Association of Indian Universities (AIU).

== Cultural festival ==
The annual cultural festival of IMS Unison University is called Lamhe. Lamhe is a three-day event. Notable appearances include Salim Sulaiman in 2025 and DJ NYK and Ash King in 2017.

== Placement advertisements ==
In June 2016 an advertisement by the IMS Unison University was one of 98 advertisements banned by the Advertising Standards Council of India's (ASCI) Consumer Complaints Council (CCC), 39 of which belonged to the education category. The ad, claiming "Over 90% Placement consistently in last three years", was banned for being "not substantiated and misleading".
