= List of institutions of higher education in Himachal Pradesh =

This is a list of institutions of higher education in Indian state of Himachal Pradesh.

== Universities ==
University	Location	Type	Year estab.	Specialization	Refs.
Abhilashi University	Mandi	Private	2015	General	
APG Shimla University	Shimla	Private	2012	General	
Atal Medical and Research University	Mandi	State	2018	Health University	
Arni University	Kathgarh	Private	2009	General	
Baddi University of Emerging Sciences and Technologies	Baddi	Private	2009	Technology	
Bahra University	Waknaghat	Private	2011	General	
Career Point University, Hamirpur	Hamirpur	Private	2012	General	
Chaudhary Sarwan Kumar Himachal Pradesh Krishi Vishvavidyalaya	Palampur	State	1978	Agriculture	
Central University of Himachal Pradesh	Dharamsala	Central	2009	General	
Chitkara University, Himachal Pradesh	Solan	Private	2009	Technology	
Dr. Yashwant Singh Parmar University of Horticulture and Forestry	Solan	State	1985	Horticulture, forestry	
Eternal University	Baru Sahib	Private	2008	General	
Himachal Pradesh University	Shimla	State	1970	General	
Himachal Pradesh Technical University	Hamirpur	State	2010	Technology	
IEC University	Solan	Private	2012	General, technology, management, pharmacy, law, computer application	
ICFAI University	Solan	Private	2011	General, law, management, technology	
Indus International University	VPO Bathu, Tehsil Haroli, Dist. Una	Private	2010	General, technology, management, science and humanities	
Jaypee University of Information Technology	Waknaghat	Private	2002	Information technology	
Maharaja Agrasen University	Solan	Private	2013	Applied Sciences, Architecture, Humanities, Law, Management, Pharmacy, Technology	
Maharishi Markandeshwar University, Solan	Solan	Private	2010	Technology, management	
Manav Bharti University	Solan	Private	2009	General	
Sardar Patel University Mandi	Mandi	State	2022	General	
Shoolini University	Solan	Private	2009	General	
Sri Sai University	Palampur	Private	2011	General	
Himalayan Group of Professional Institutions	Kala Amb	Private	2002	Engineering, Pharmacy, Nursing, Education, Management, Law	

== Engineering institutions ==
Autonomous Institutions

- National Institute of Technology, Hamirpur
- Indian Institute of Technology Mandi
- Indian Institute of Information Technology Una

Govt university departments

- University Institute of Information Technology, Himachal Pradesh University, Shimla (2000)
- University College of Business Studies, Himachal Pradesh University, Shimla

Private university departments

- AP Goyal Shimla University, Shimla, District Shimla, HP
- Arni School of Technology, Arni University, Indora, District. Kangra (2009)
- Institute of Engineering and Emerging Technologies, Baddi University of Emerging Sciences and Technologies, Baddi (2002)
- School of Engineering & Technology, Bahra University, Waknaghat, Solan
- Chitkara School of Engineering and Technology, Chitkara University, Himachal Pradesh, Barotiwala, District. Solan (2008)
- Akal College of Engineering and Technology, Eternal University, Baru Sahib, Dist Sirmour (2007)
- Indus International University, una
- Sri Sai University, Palampur

Colleges affiliated to Himachal Pradesh Technical University

- Atal Bihari Vajpayee Government Institute of Engineering and Technology, Pragatinagar, Shimla
- Dev Bhumy Institute of Engineering & Technology, Chandpur, Una
- Green Hills Engineering College, Kumarhatti (2003)
- Himachal Institute of Engineering, Paonta Sahib
- Himachal Institute of Engineering and Technology, Shahpur Kangra (2010)
- Himalayan Institute of Engineering and Technology, Kala Amb, Dist Sirmour (2009)
- IITT college of Engineering, Kala Amb (1997)
- Jawaharlal Nehru Government Engineering College, Sundernagar (2006)
- K.C. Institute of Engineering and Technology, District. Una (2009)
- L.R. Institute of Engineering & Technology, Solan-173223, Solan (2008)
- Mahant Ram Institute of Technology College of Engineering and Management, Bani, District. Hamirpur (2009)
- Rajiv Gandhi Government Engineering College Kangra
- SAI Ram Educational Trust Group of Institutions, Bullah Tipper, Dist Hamirpur (2009)
- Shiva Institute of Engineering and Technology, Bilaspur (2009)
- Sirda Institute of Engineering and Emerging Technology for Women, District. Mandi (2009)
- T. R. Abhilashi Memorial Institute of Engineering and Technology, Tanda, District. Mandi (2009)
- Vaishno College of Engineering, Kangra (2010)

=== Private Dental Colleges ===
- Bhojia Dental College & Hospital, Baddi, District. Solan
- Himachal Pradesh Dental College, Mandi
- Himachal Institute of Dental Sciences, Poanta Sahib
- M.N.D.A.V. Dental College & Hospital, Solan

=== Govt Medical Colleges ===
- All India Institute of Medical Sciences Bilaspur (AIIMS Bilaspur).
- Dr. Rajender Prasad Govt. Medical College, Kangra at Tanda
- Indira Gandhi Medical College and Hospital, Shimla
- Dr. Yashwant Singh Parmar Government Medical College, Nahan, Sirmaur H.P.
- Dr. Radhakrishnan Government Medical College (RGMC Hamirpur)

=== Private medical colleges ===
- Maharishi Markandeshwar Medical College & Hospital, Solan

=== Homoeopathic Colleges ===
- Solan Homoeopathic Medical College & Hospital, Kumarhatti, District. Solan

=== Other Colleges ===
- Akal College of Nursing, Eternal University, Baru Sahib, District. Sirmour

== Pharmacy colleges ==
- Abhilashi Group of Institutions (School of Pharmacy), Chail Chowk, Tehsil Chachyot, District. Mandi
- Baddi University of Emerging Sciences and Technologies, Baddi (2002)
- DDM College of Pharmacy, Gondpur Banehra (Upper), Tehsil Amb, District. Una
- Dreamz college of pharmacy, Village Khilra, PO Meramasit, Tehsil Sundernagar, District. Mandi
- Govt. B. Pharmacy College
- Govt. College of Pharmacy, Rohru, District. Shimla
- Himachal Institute of Pharmaceutical Education & Research (HIPER), VPO Bela, Tehsil Nadaun, District. Hamirpur
- Himalayan Institute of Pharmacy, near Suketi Fossil Park Road, Kala Amb, District. Sirmour
- Himachal Institute of Pharmacy, Rampur Ghat Road, Paonta sahib, District. Sirmour
- IEC School of Pharmacy, Baddi, Solan
- KC Institute of Pharmaceutical Sciences, VPO. Pandoga Uparla, District. Una
- Laureate Institute of Pharmacy, VPO Kathog (Jawalaji), Tehsil Dehra, District. Kangra
- LR. Institute of Pharmacy, Vill. Jabli-Kyar, P.O. Ochghat, Sultanpur Road, District. Solan
- Sai Ram Education Trust's College of B. Pharmacy, VPO Tipper, Tehsil Barsar, District. Hamirpur
- Vinyaka College of Pharmacy, Village Bohoguna, P.O. Garsa, District. Kullu
- Govt. Pharmacy College Seraj, Mandi
- (Off campus) Bagsaid

== Ayurveda colleges ==
- College of Ayurvedic Pharmaceutical Sciences, Jogindernagar
- Rajiv Gandhi Govt. Ayurvedic College Paprola, Kangra

== Autonomous institutions ==
- Himachal Pradesh National Law University, Shimla, Himachal Pradesh
- Indian Institute of Management Sirmaur
- National Institute of Fashion Technology, Kangra

== Thinktanks / Other Institutions ==
- TQM World Institution of Quality Excellence (TQM-WIQE), Solan, Himachal Pradesh

== See also ==
- List of educational institutions in Shimla
