= Education in Himachal Pradesh =

Education in area of India

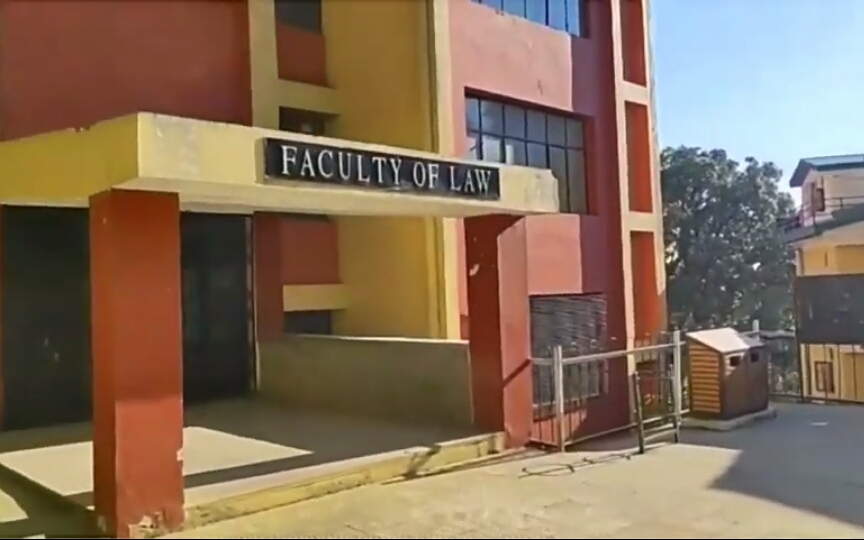
Faculty of Law, Himachal Pradesh University

Himachal Pradesh was under the direct control of the British colonial rule in the mid 19th century. Also, the state was the summer capital of India during the British colonial rule. Hence, the standard of education provided in the state has reached to a considerably high level. The state has several highly reputed educational institutions for higher studies.
The Indian Institute of Technology Mandi, Himachal Pradesh University (HPU), Indian Institute of Management Sirmaur and NIT Hamirpur are some of the pioneer institutions located in the state. The University Grants Commission (UGC) has allocated Rs 45 million to Himachal Pradesh University in the 10th plan which is an increase of nearly 70% over the ninth one. The All India Institute of Medical Sciences is located in Bilasur district.

The government is working constantly to prepare various plans to strengthen the education system of Himachal. The state government has decided to start up with three major nursing colleges to develop the health system in the state.

Himachal has one of the highest literacy rates in India. Hamirpur District is among the top districts in the country for literacy. Education rates among women are quite encouraging in the state.
Himachal Pradesh is home to many educational institutions offering a wide variety of courses. There are five universities, eight medical colleges, five dental colleges and two engineering colleges in the state. There are over 10,000 primary schools, 1,000 secondary schools and more than 1,300 high schools in Himachal. Hindi and English are compulsory languages in schools whereas Punjabi, Sanskrit, Tamil, Telugu and Urdu are chosen as optional languages.

In meeting the constitutional obligation to make primary education compulsory, Himachal has now become the first state in India to make elementary education accessible to every child in the state. Himachal Pradesh government is also very keen to transform this state into an education hub. In March 2008, Government of India made an announcement stating that as part of the 11th five-year plan, an Indian Institute of Technology will be established in this state. Further, Atal Bihari Vajpayee Government Engineering and Technology Institute has been started at Pragatinagar, in Shimla district. This college will have engineering related courses such as ITI, Diploma and Degree all in same campus.

== Educational Institutes ==
- Solan Homoeopathic Medical College & Hospital, Kumarhatti, Solan district
- Career Point University, Hamirpur
- Indian Institute of Management Sirmaur
- Alakh Prakash Goyal University
- Indian Institute of Information Technology Una
- Himachal Pradesh National Law University
- Dr. Yashwant Singh Parmar University of Horticulture and Forestry
- Green Hills Engineering College
- Himachal Pradesh University
- IITT college of Engineering
- Indian Institute of Advanced Study
- Baddi University of Emerging Sciences and Technology
- Maharaja Agrasen University, Himachal Pradesh
- National Institute of Technology, Hamirpur
- Jaypee University of Information Technology
- Chitkara University, Himachal Pradesh
- University Institute of Information Technology (UIIT)

== Engineering institutions ==
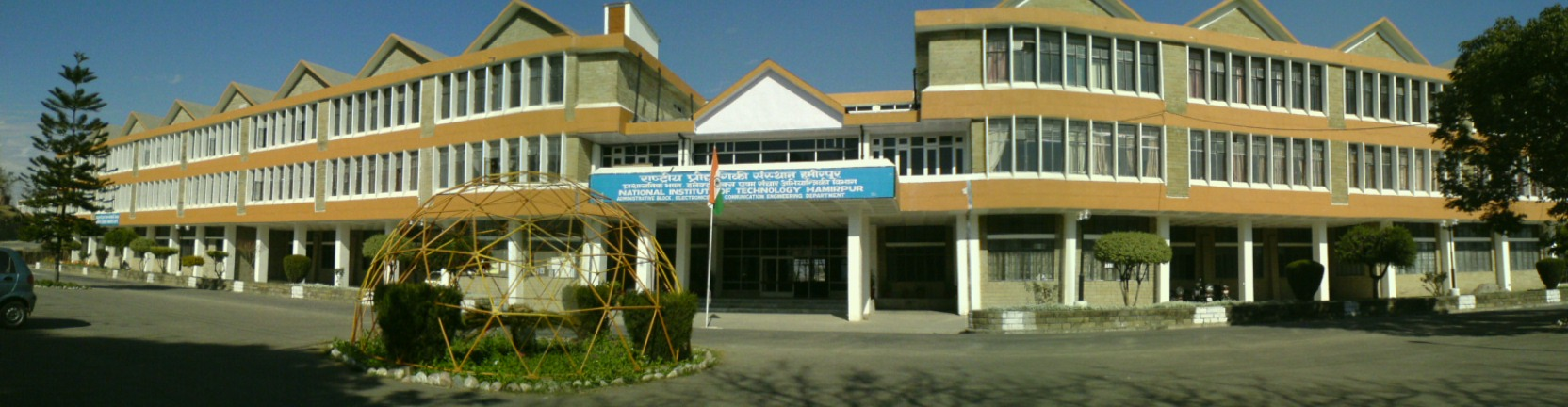
National Institute of Technology, Hamirpur, (Admin block)

The state of Himachal Pradesh is a late starter in establishing engineering institutes as compared to other states of India. National Institute of Technology, Hamirpur (then Regional Engineering College, Hamirpur) was the first institute established in 1986. IITT college of Engineering, Kala Amb was the second institute established in the 20th century. The remaining institutes were established in the 21st century. A Government engineering school namely, Jawaharlal Nehru Government Engineering College in Sundernagar, was established by the state govt in 2006. Though some institutions (notably National Institute of Technology, Hamirpur) are striving hard to be centers of excellence.

Facts and Figures
Type	Number
Primary schools	10483
Middle schools	1056
Secondary / Higher secondary schools	1339
General colleges	64
Medical colleges	25
Homoeopathic medical colleges	01
Engineering	187
Universities	20
S.S.I. Units	30176

== Educational institutions (non-governmental) ==
Himachal Pradesh is home to several non-governmental organisations (NGO) operating educational institutes in the state.

- Deer Park Institute offers educational courses and seminars in classical Indian wisdom traditions.
- TQM World Institution of Quality Excellence (TQM-WIQE), It provides training & consulting for the Quality and Productivity Improvement of MSMEs and MNCs.Also provide training for Schools, Educational Institutions and Universities.
- Dharmalaya Institute provides education and vocational training in vernacular earthen architecture in the traditional Kangra style, as well as service-learning courses in sustainable living and immersive ecotourism programs.
- NISHTHA is a charitable trust working for the benefit and development of society as a whole by improving the welfare of families with particular focus on women and children, through activities in the fields of health, education and environment.
- Shantideva Homeopathic Research Institute (SHRI) runs educational programs to increase awareness of healthy lifestyles, offering free clinics and seminars for the rural population of Himachal Pradesh.

Dr Puran Chand Medical Charitable Trust (Regd) runs a number of Institutions in the State – Himachal Dental College, Sundernagar (District Mandi), Himachal Institute of Dental Sciences, Himachal Institute of Technology, Himachal Institute of Nursing, Himachal Institute of Life Sciences, and Himachal Institute of Pharmacy all at Paonta Sahib (District Sirmaur)

== See also ==
- List of educational institutions in Himachal Pradesh
