= Outline of Himachal Pradesh =

State in northwestern India

Location of Himachal Pradesh

The following outline is provided as an overview of and topical guide to Himachal Pradesh:

Himachal Pradesh – state in North India. Its area is 55,673 km^{2} (21,495 sq mi), and is bordered by Jammu and Kashmir on the north, Punjab on the west, Haryana on the south-west, Uttarakhand on the south-east and by the Tibet Autonomous Region on the east. Hima means snow in Sanskrit, and the literal meaning of the state's name is in the lap of the Himalayas. It was named by Acharya Diwakar Datt Sharma, one of the most eminent Sanskrit scholars of Himachal Pradesh.

== General reference ==
=== Names ===
- Common English name: Himachal Pradesh
  - Hindustani: [ɦɪˈmaːtʃəl pɾəˈdeːʃ]
  - Meaning: "Snow-laden Province"
- Official English name(s): Himachal Pradesh
- Nickname(s):
- Adjectival(s): Himachali
- Demonym(s): Himachalis

=== Rankings (amongst India's states) ===
- by population: 21st
- by area (2011 census): 18th
- by crime rate: 15th
- by gross domestic product (GDP) (2014): 21st
- by Human Development Index (HDI):
- by life expectancy at birth:
- by literacy rate:

== Geography of Himachal Pradesh ==
Geography of Himachal Pradesh

- Himachal Pradesh is: an Indian state
- Population of Himachal Pradesh:
- Area of Himachal Pradesh:
- Atlas of Himachal Pradesh

=== Location of Himachal Pradesh ===
- Himachal Pradesh is situated within the following regions:
  - Northern Hemisphere
  - Eastern Hemisphere
    - Eurasia
      - Asia
        - South Asia
          - Indian subcontinent
            - India
              - North India
- Time zone: Indian Standard Time (UTC+05:30)

=== Environment of Himachal Pradesh ===
- Climate of Himachal Pradesh
- Protected areas of Himachal Pradesh
  - Biosphere reserves in Himachal Pradesh
  - National parks of Himachal Pradesh
- Wildlife of Himachal Pradesh

==== Natural geographic features of Himachal Pradesh ====
- Lakes of Himachal Pradesh

=== Regions of Himachal Pradesh ===
- Mahasu region
- Trigarta region
- Bodhish-Himalayish region

==== Administrative divisions of Himachal Pradesh ====
===== Districts of Himachal Pradesh =====
- Districts of Himachal Pradesh

===== Municipalities of Himachal Pradesh =====
- Cities of Himachal Pradesh
  - Capital of Himachal Pradesh: Capital of Himachal Pradesh

=== Demography of Himachal Pradesh ===
Demographics of Himachal Pradesh

== Government and politics of Himachal Pradesh ==
Politics of Himachal Pradesh

- Form of government: Indian state government (parliamentary system of representative democracy)
- Capital of Himachal Pradesh: Capital of Himachal Pradesh
- Elections in Himachal Pradesh

=== Union government in Himachal Pradesh ===
- Rajya Sabha members from Himachal Pradesh
- Himachal Pradesh Congress Committee
- Indian general election, 2019 (Himachal Pradesh)

=== Branches of the government of Himachal Pradesh ===
Government of Himachal Pradesh

==== Executive branch of the government of Himachal Pradesh ====
- Head of state: Governor of Himachal Pradesh,
- Head of government: Chief Minister of Himachal Pradesh,

==== Legislative branch of the government of Himachal Pradesh ====
Himachal Pradesh Legislative Assembly

- Constituencies of Himachal Pradesh Legislative Assembly

=== Law and order in Himachal Pradesh ===
- Law enforcement in Himachal Pradesh
  - Himachal Pradesh Police

== History of Himachal Pradesh ==
History of Himachal Pradesh

=== History of Himachal Pradesh, by region ===
- Trigarta Kingdom
- Mahasu region
- Trigarta region
- Bodish-Himalyish region

== Culture of Himachal Pradesh ==
Culture of Himachal Pradesh

- Architecture of Himachal Pradesh
- Cuisine of Himachal Pradesh
- Languages of Himachal Pradesh
- Monuments in Himachal Pradesh
  - Monuments of National Importance in Himachal Pradesh
  - State Protected Monuments in Himachal Pradesh
- World Heritage Sites in Himachal Pradesh

=== Art in Himachal Pradesh ===
- Music of Himachal Pradesh

=== People of Himachal Pradesh ===
- People from Himachal Pradesh

=== Religion in Himachal Pradesh ===
Religion in Himachal Pradesh

- Buddhism in Himachal Pradesh

=== Sports in Himachal Pradesh ===
Sports in Himachal Pradesh

- Cricket in Himachal Pradesh
  - Himachal Pradesh Cricket Association
  - Himachal Pradesh cricket team
- Football in Himachal Pradesh
  - Himachal Pradesh Football Association
  - Himachal Pradesh State League
  - Himachal Pradesh football team

=== Symbols of Himachal Pradesh ===
Symbols of Himachal Pradesh

- State animal: Snow Leopard
- State bird: Western Tragopan
- State flower: Pink Rhododendron
- State seal: Seal of Himachal Pradesh
- State tree: Deodar Cedar

== Economy and infrastructure of Himachal Pradesh ==
Economy of Himachal Pradesh

- Agriculture in Himachal Pradesh
  - Himachal Seb Utpadak Sangh, a farmers organization
- Transport in Himachal Pradesh

== Education in Himachal Pradesh ==
Education in Himachal Pradesh

- Institutions of higher education in Himachal Pradesh

== Health in Himachal Pradesh ==
Health in Himachal Pradesh

== See also ==
- Outline of India
