= Chitkara University =

Chitkara University may refer to one of two universities in India:

- Chitkara University, Himachal Pradesh
- Chitkara University, Punjab
