= Jhansla =

Coordinates: 30°31′39″N 76°39′47″E

Jhansla is a village in Punjab, India, near Banur.

The Chitkara University, Punjab, the Swami Vivekanand Institute of Engineering and Technology, and the Gian Sagar Institute for Medical Studies are all in Jhansla.
