= List of educational institutions in Shimla =

This is a list of educational institutions in Shimla, India.

== Schools ==
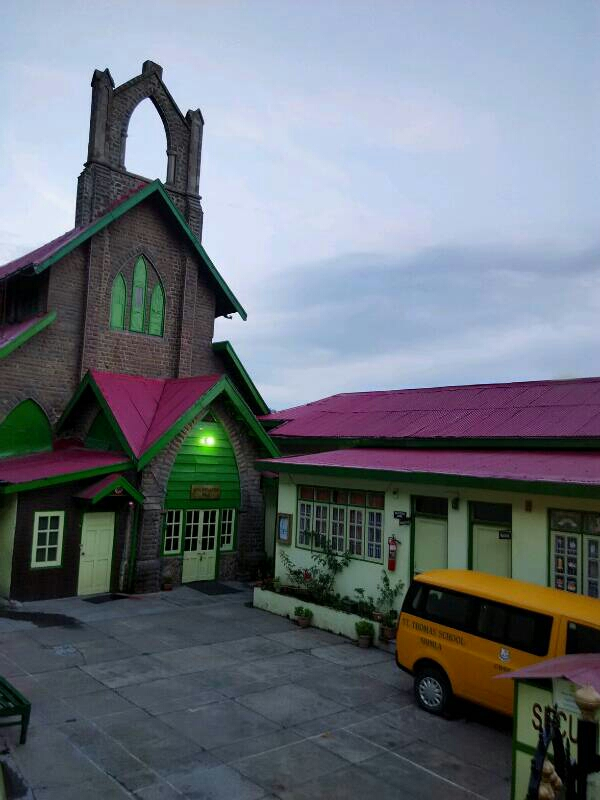
St. Thomas School Shimla

- Auckland House School
- Bishop Cotton School
- Central School for Tibetans
- Convent of Jesus and Mary, Chelsea
- Himalayan International School, Chharabra
- Loreto Convent, Tara Hall
- Shimla Public School
- S.D. Senior Secondary School
- St. Edward's School

== Colleges ==
- Government College, Sanjauli
- St. Bede's College

== Universities ==
- Alakh Prakash Goyal University
- Himachal Pradesh University
- Himachal Pradesh National Law University
