= Waknaghat =

- Town
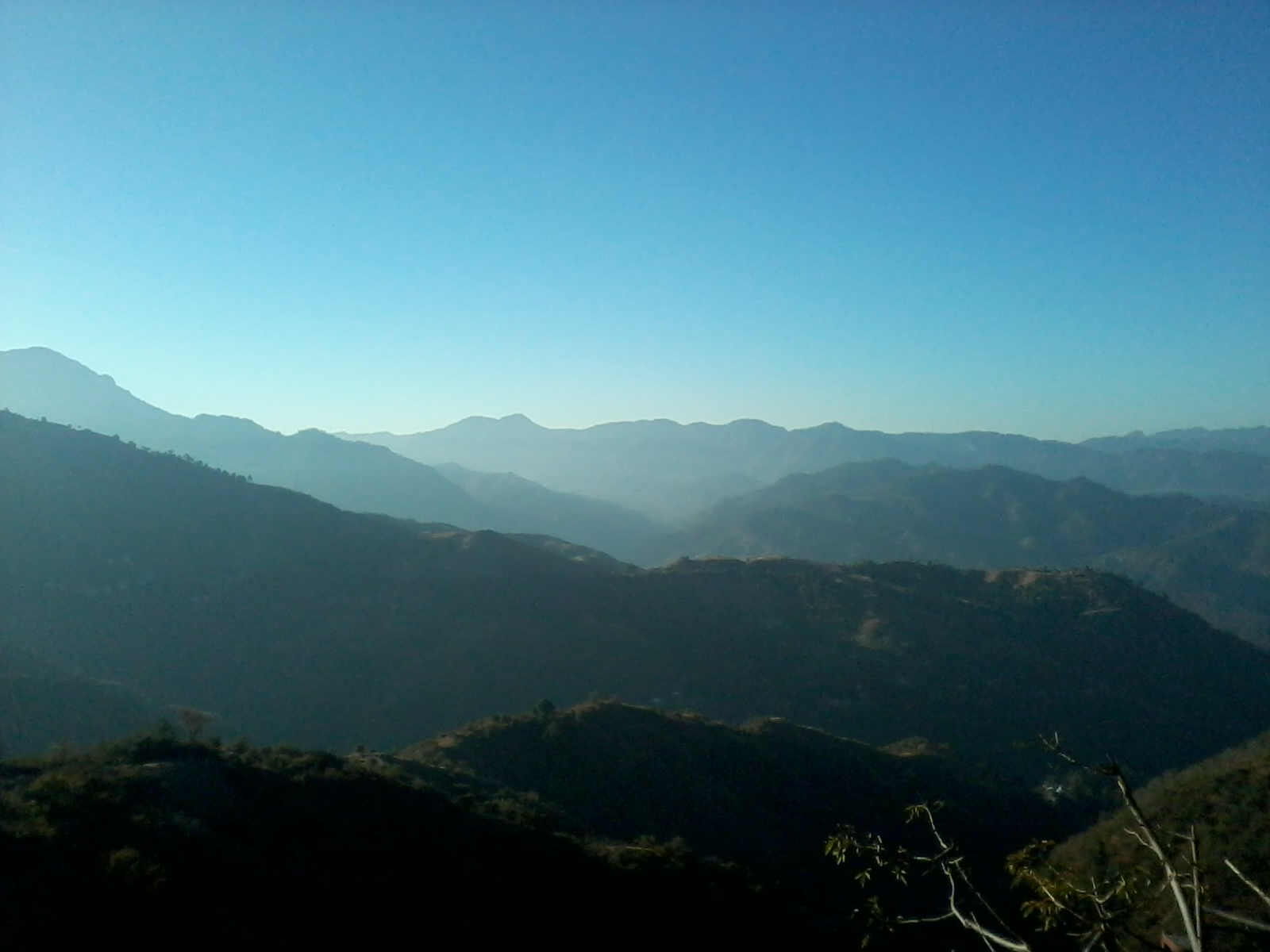
- Early morning view from Wakanaghat

- Location in Himachal Pradesh, India Waknaghat (India)
- Coordinates: 31.02°N 77.08°E
- Country: India
- State: Himachal Pradesh
- District: Solan
- Elevation: 1,544 m (5,066 ft)

Languages
  - Official: Hindi
  - Native: Mahasui (Baghati)
- Time zone: UTC+5:30 (IST)
- PIN: 173234

Waknaghat is a small town in Solan district in the Indian state of Himachal Pradesh which falls on the way to Shimla from Kalka. It is located on National Highway 22. Waknaghat is around 22 km (14 mi) from Shimla and 25 km (16 mi) from Solan. Other nearby villages and towns are Wakna, Domehar, Aanji-Sunara, Sabathu, Mamligh, Shoghi and Kandaghat, Kanairghati, Dhyari. Nearby railway stations include Kaithlighat, 3 km (1.9 mi) from Waknaghat, and Kandaghat, 12 km (7.5 mi) from Waknaghat.

== Regional resources ==
Waknaghat is surrounded by agricultural land, and holds the Sabzi Mandi of Solan. Waknaghat is known for tomato, ginger, peas, cauliflower, capsicum, cabbage, lady finger, beans, pepper, pahari potato, kheera as well as stone fruits.

Waknaghat has lime and sand quarries as well as stone mines. Waknaghat also has sweet mineral water in and around it.

== Geography ==
=== Climate ===
Situated at an altitude of 1,700 m (5,600 ft) on average, Waknaghat has a cool climate. Lying in the middle of the Solan - Shimla segment of N.H.- 05 it has a moderate set of conditions; i.e., neither so cold as Shimla, nor too hot as Kalka as the temperature hardly rises above 32 °C (90 °F). During winters Waknaghat experiences little snowfall. Temperatures typically range from −4 °C (25 °F) to 32 °C (90 °F) over the course of a year.

Climate data for Waknaghat
Month	Jan	Feb	Mar	Apr	May	Jun	Jul	Aug	Sep	Oct	Nov	Dec	Year
Record high °C (°F)	21.2 (70.2)	13.4 (56.1)	24.9 (76.8)	29.3 (84.7)	31.0 (87.8)	32.6 (90.7)	29.8 (85.6)	27.6 (81.7)	24.4 (75.9)	23.9 (75.0)	19.4 (66.9)	22.0 (71.6)	33.4 (92.1)
Mean daily maximum °C (°F)	8.3 (46.9)	8.9 (48.0)	13.9 (57.0)	18.3 (64.9)	22.2 (72.0)	22.8 (73.0)	20.6 (69.1)	19.4 (66.9)	19.4 (66.9)	17.2 (63.0)	13.9 (57.0)	10.6 (51.1)	16.3 (61.3)
Mean daily minimum °C (°F)	−2.2 (28.0)	−2.8 (27.0)	6.7 (44.1)	11.1 (52.0)	19.4 (66.9)	21.1 (70.0)	22.6 (72.7)	17.0 (62.6)	16.9 (62.4)	12.6 (54.7)	7.2 (45.0)	−1.4 (29.5)	8.0 (46.4)
Record low °C (°F)	−9.4 (15.1)	−7.7 (18.1)	−5.6 (21.9)	0.0 (32.0)	4.4 (39.9)	7.8 (46.0)	10.0 (50.0)	11.1 (52.0)	5.0 (41.0)	3.9 (39.0)	0.0 (32.0)	−6.1 (21.0)	−9.4 (15.1)

=== Geology ===
Dagshai - Solan - Kandaghat - Waknaghat - Kaithlighat - Taradevi - Kareru - Shimla is the main ridge forming partition line between the Sutlej and Yamuna catchments. Thus a drop of rain falling on the eastern past of Karol hill ultimately goes into the Bay of Bengal whereas the drop falling on the western part ultimately leads to the Arabian Sea.

== Transport ==
=== By road ===
Waknaghat is easily accessible by road. It is 93 km (58 mi) from Chandigarh (3.5 hours journey by bus) and 22 km (14 mi) from Shimla (1 hours journey by bus).

The National Highway 5 is a prominent road passing through Waknaghat town. It is an important road from many points of view. Firstly it is a defence road connecting Delhi, Dehradun, Ambala and Chandigarh to the China Border. In addition, all raw products, building materials, passengers, goods etc. come through this route only. It is on account of its significance that there are today 2 bypasses within Solan Planning Area. The Central Government is also likely to undertake the 4-laning of this road. Surveys and studies have been completed in this regard. Besides N.H.-05, there are many other significant roads connecting Solan to its nearby areas, towns or settlements. These include:

- Waknaghat - Subhatu road.
- Waknaghat - Wakna Village Road.
- Waknaghat - Solan- Shimla (NH-05).

=== By rail ===
The Kalka-Shimla Railway is included in the UNESCO World Heritage List.

=== By air ===
The nearest airport is Shimla Airport which is about 20 km (12 mi) from Waknaghat. The Himachal Pradesh Government is setting up its first international airport at an investment of Rs.1,000 crore in Solan district of the state on a public private partnership model.

== Education ==
Post-secondary educational facilities include the Jaypee University of Information Technology. There is one private university in the city, Bahra University.
