= Dr. Yashwant Singh Parmar Government Medical College =

Medical school in Himachal Pradesh, India

Dr. Yashwant Singh Parmar Government Medical College Nahan
- Motto: Arogya Sukh Sampada
- Type: Public
- Established: 2016; 10 years ago
- Affiliations: Atal Medical and Research University, NMC
- Endowment: 290cr
- Principal: Dr. Sangeet Dhillon
- Undergraduates: 560
- Location: Nahan, Himachal Pradesh, India; 30.564°N 77.294°E
- Campus: Urban
- Website: www.yspgmc.org

Dr. Yashwant Singh Parmar Government Medical College is a medical college located in Nahan, Sirmaur district of Himachal Pradesh. It was established in 2016 and was named after first Chief Minister of Himachal Pradesh Dr. Yashwant (YSPGMC). It is a renowned as a medical institution and is widely regarded as the third medical college in Himachal Pradesh followed by Indira Gandhi Medical College and Hospital & Dr. Rajendra Prasad Government Medical College.

History:

The college's foundation stone was laid by then Chief Minister of Himachal Pradesh, on November 6, 2016. to address the growing demand for skilled healthcare professionals in the state, YSPGMC was established to contribute significantly to medical education and healthcare delivery. The initial intake of the college was 100 MBBS seats which was subsequently increased to existing intake of 120.

Academic Programs:

YSPGMC offers a range of undergraduate and postgraduate medical courses, including the Bachelor of Medicine and Bachelor of Surgery (MBBS) program and various specialties at the postgraduate level.

Courses offered are as below:

Bachelor of Medicine, Bachelor of Surgery (MBBS) : A total of 120 students are admitted to the MBBS program, and the selection process is carried out through NEET, with 15% of the seats being reserved for the All India Quota. After the NEET Cut Offs are declared, the AMRU starts the admission and counselling process for students on behalf of YSPGMC.

General Nursing and Midwifery : Every year, Dr. Yashwant Singh Parmar Government Medical College witnesses the enrollment of 30 dedicated and aspiring students into its General Nursing and Midwifery (GNM) program.

Post Graduation, Community Medicine :

The National Medical Commission (NMC) has approved three seats for PG in Community Medicine in YSPGMC.

Campus and Facilities:

Situated in the town of Nahan, the Government Hospital is converted to a medical college. Hostel Facility is available for girls and boys for MBBS students, hostels are located 4 KM away from the Medical College.
