= Vijay Kumar Thakur =

Indian materials scientist and polymer chemist (born 1981)

Dr Vijay Kumar
- Born: 17 December 1981 (age 44); Bilaspur, Bilaspur district, Himachal Pradesh, India
- Education: Iowa State University, USA. Himachal Pradesh University Shimla. National Institute of Technology, Hamirpur.

Vijay Kumar Thakur is an Indian-born British materials scientist, biobased materials engineer, polymer chemist, academic and author whose research covers polymer science, nanotechnology, biomaterials, green chemistry, biorefining, sustainable materials, cellulose, nanocellulose, hydrogels, environmental remediation and energy materials.

His research has focused particularly on the development of functional materials from renewable resources and waste-derived feedstocks, including bioplastics, biomaterials, composites, sustainable packaging, hydrogels, membranes and materials for environmental and energy applications.

In 2020, he was named a Clarivate Highly Cited Researcher.

== Education and career ==
Vijay studied chemistry, physics and mathematics at undergraduate level and subsequently obtained a B.Ed. and an M.Sc. in organic chemistry from Himachal Pradesh University. He received his Ph.D. in polymer chemistry in 2009 and later undertook postdoctoral research in materials science and engineering at Iowa State University.

His research appointments have included positions at Lunghwa University of Science and Technology in Taiwan, Nanyang Technological University in Singapore, Iowa State University, Washington State University and Cranfield University in the United Kingdom.

In 2020, Thakur joined Scotland's Rural College (SRUC), where he served as Professor of Biorefining and Functional Materials and Head of the Biorefining and Advanced Materials Research Centre. His work there included bioplastics, biomaterials, green chemistry, composites, nanomaterials, sustainable packaging, recycling, environmental remediation, hydrogels, membranes and energy materials.

== Media coverage ==
Research involving Vijay has been discussed in specialist science and technology publications in connection with renewable materials, waste-derived products and polymer applications. Reports have addressed work on wood- and hemp-based packaging, conversion of agricultural residues into textile materials, cellulose recovery from livestock waste and plant-based hydrogels.

Additional coverage or discussion of related research has appeared in Phys.org, Science Trends, Technology Networks, AZoBuild and The Conversation.

- Chemical & Engineering News — “Biocompatible Material Contains Sunscreen From The Sea” (21 January 2025).
- Technology Networks — “Graphene: What Is It, and What Is It Used For?” (30 November 2024): https://www.technologynetworks.com/cell-science/lists/graphene-what-is-it-and-what-is-it-used-for-393831
- AZoBuild — “Boron Nitride as a Lubricant in Construction Machinery” (7 November 2024): https://www.azobuild.com/article.aspx?ArticleID=8708
- Phys.org / The Conversation — “Plant-based plastics could help reduce the millions of tons of medical waste hospitals generate each year” (13 March 2025): https://phys.org/news/2025-03-based-plastics-millions-tons-medical.html
- McMaster News — republication of the same Conversation article (13 March 2025): https://news.mcmaster.ca/analysis-plant-based-plastics-could-reduce-the-millions-of-tonnes-of-medical-waste-hospitals-generate-each-year/
- SRUC — “SRUC academic ranked alongside Nobel laureates” (19 November 2020; institutional source): https://www.sruc.ac.uk/all-news/sruc-academic-ranked-alongside-nobel-laureates/
- Cranfield University — “Turning crop waste into high-value fashion products” (25 February 2021; institutional source): https://www.cranfield.ac.uk/press/news-2021/turning-crop-waste-into-high-value-fashion-products
- University of Bristol — “Cow dung possible sustainable material of the future, study finds” (13 March 2023; institutional source): https://www.bristol.ac.uk/cabot/news/2023/cow-dung.html
- AZoNano — “Cellulose Nano Crystals: An Alternative to Fossil Fuels” (3 April 2025; URL not supplied in dossier).
- Scottish Field — “SRUC: Where there's muck, there's brass” (13 March 2023; URL not supplied in dossier).

== Research ==
=== Cellulose, nanocellulose and sustainable materials ===
A major theme of Thakur's research has been the development of materials from renewable and waste-derived resources, particularly cellulose, nanocellulose and other bio-based polymers.

In 2017, he co-authored a review in Nanoscale on the sources, production and properties of cellulose nanocrystals and their potential applications in functional materials.

His subsequent work has included nanocellulose foams produced from wood and hemp biomass residues.

This work received coverage in Converter Magazine concerning the potential packaging value of wood- and hemp-derived nanocellulose.

His research has also included hemp-based bioplastics incorporating reversible thermal crosslinking.

Another strand of his research has examined agricultural, livestock and other biological wastes as sources of higher-value cellulosic materials. Research on extracting cellulosic materials from ruminant waste streams received coverage from Phys.org and the University of Bristol.

Research on regenerated cellulose/curcumin composite fibres and the conversion of crop waste into materials for sustainable textiles also received coverage from Phys.org.

=== Hydrogels and biomedical materials ===
Thakur has researched bio-based and polysaccharide-derived hydrogels and nanomaterials for biomedical applications.

He co-authored a review in Applied Materials Today examining plant-based green hydrogels for applications including tissue engineering, drug delivery and wound treatment.

The research was subsequently discussed by AZoM in an article on plant-based hydrogels and their biomedical applications.

His work has also included polysaccharide hydrogels for wound healing, and sustainable chitosan-based nanocomposites for wound-dressing applications.

The chitosan research was covered by Phys.org in 2023.

His biomedical-materials research has additionally included hyaluronic acid- and chitosan-based nanosystems for delivery of the anticancer drug doxorubicin.

=== Environmental and agricultural applications ===
Thakur's research has addressed sustainable materials for water and air purification, environmental remediation and agricultural applications.

A review in the Journal of Bioresources and Bioproducts examined cellulose-based materials for water remediation, including membranes, adsorbents, hydrogels, aerogels and nanocellulose systems.

The work was subsequently discussed by Phys.org in coverage of cellulose-based approaches to sustainable water treatment.

In sustainable agriculture, Thakur co-authored a review in the Journal of Plant Growth Regulation on nanoparticle- and nanofiber-based seed coatings for germination, crop protection and controlled delivery of agricultural inputs.

His work has also considered supramolecular biopolymers, hydrogels, natural-polymer encapsulation systems and other functional materials for sustainable agriculture.

=== Energy and functional materials ===
Thakur's research has included electrochemical energy storage, fuel cells, supercapacitors, photocatalysis and functional nanomaterials.

In 2024, he co-authored a review in Advanced Energy and Sustainability Research examining electrode materials for direct ethanol fuel cells.

His work in this area has additionally included graphene-based battery materials, magnesium-ion batteries, supercapacitor electrodes, MXene-based functional materials and electrocatalysts.
