= Shri Lal Bahadur Shastri Government Medical College =

Shri Lal Bahadur Shastri Government Medical College and Hospital
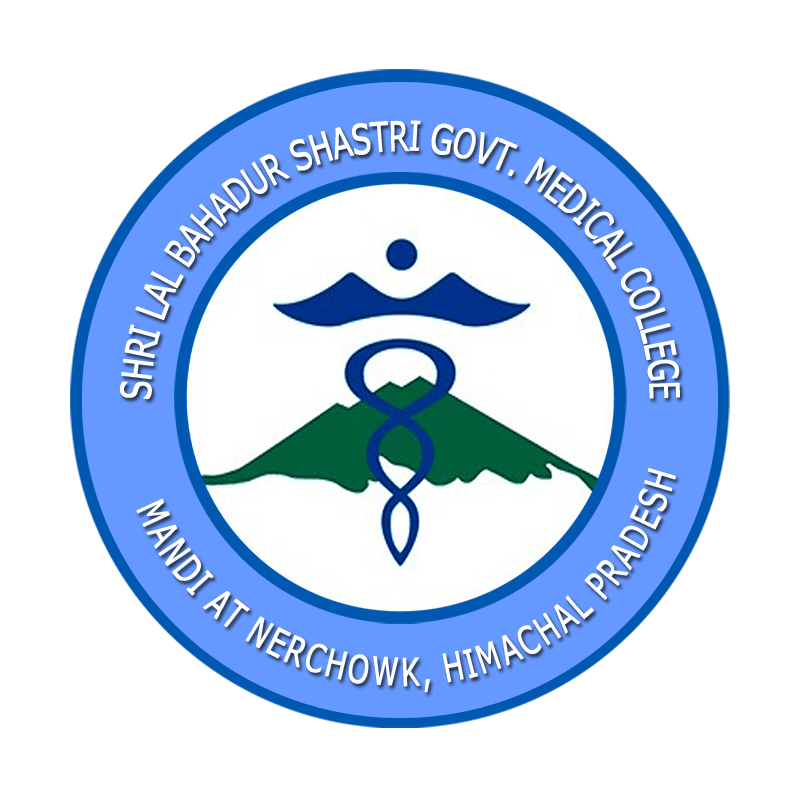
- Type: Public
- Established: 2009; 17 years ago
- Affiliations: Atal Medical and Research University, NMC
- Principal: Dr. D. K. Verma
- Location: Ner Chowk, PO Bhangrotu, Tehsil Balh, District Mandi, Himachal Pradesh, India 175021; 31.609°N 76.920°E
- Campus: 32 Acres of medical college and 45 Bigahs Hospital
- Nickname: SLBS GMCH
- Website: www.slbsgmchmandi.com

Shri Lal Bahadur Shastri Government Medical College & Hospital (or SLBC GMCH) is a public medical college located in Mandi, Himachal Pradesh, affiliated to Atal Medical and Research University, Mandi, HP.

== History ==
It was founded as Employee's State Insurance Corporation Medical College in 2009 by Oscar Fernandes, the then Union Minister of Labour & Employment.

In the year 2016, the management of the ESIC showed its reluctance to run this college at its own and ultimately the project was handed over to the Government of Himachal Pradesh after signing a memorandum of understanding under certain conditions. The state government has applied to the NMC to accord permission for starting the batch from 2017–18 for this medical college now renamed as Shri Lal Bahadur Shastri Govt. Medical College, Mandi at Ner Chowk.

== Infrastructure ==
- Area of Medical College: 32 acres
- Area of Hospital: 45 bighas
- Lecture Theatres, Demo rooms, Central Library, Exam Halls
- Auditorium with capacity of 800
- Boys, Girls, Nursing and residents Hostels
- Indoor Facilities: Gymnasium, Badminton Hall, Table Tennis.
- Outdoor Facilities: Football ground, Hockey, Basketball court.

== See also ==
- Atal Medical and Research University, Himachal Pradesh
