= T. R. Abhilashi Memorial Institute of Engineering and Technology =

Education institution in India

- Other name: Abhilashi Engineering College
- Motto: विद्या ददाति विनयम्
- Motto in English: Knowledge generates humility
- Type: Private
- Established: 2009
- Affiliations: Himachal Pradesh Technical University & Himachal Pradesh University, AICTE
- Chairman: Dr. R. K. Abhilashi
- Director: Dr. S. K. Shukla
- Undergraduates: 1500
- Postgraduates: 50
- Location: Mandi, Himachal Pradesh, India
- Campus: Rural, 18 acres (0.073 km^{2})
- Website: www.tramiet.in

T. R. Abhilashi Memorial Institute Of Engineering And Technology (TRAMIET) is a private engineering institution established in the year 2009, situated in the Mandi District of Himachal Pradesh and affiliated to Himachal Pradesh Technical University & Himachal Pradesh University.

== History ==
The college was started in 2009 and it took its first batch of students in 3 disciplines then affiliated to the Himachal Pradesh University, Shimla. Later it came under Himachal Pradesh Technical University after the latter was formed. It is AICTE approved.

== Campus ==
The institute is located 200 km from Chandigarh via National Highway 21 (India), 140 km from Shimla towards Manali. It is a residential campus.

=== Facilities ===
- The college has 12 acres (49,000 m^{2}) of campus housing the academic departments as well as providing residential facilities to students and faculty. The campus has class rooms, laboratories, drawing hall, workshops, library, conference hall, and student support facilities like hostels, canteen, stationery shop, medical support, transport. It has a playground where all the sporting events take place.

== Organisation and administration ==
The college is managed by Abhilashi Educational Society.

== Academics ==
=== Academic programmes ===
The college imparts NAAC accredited undergraduate courses in six streams of engineering:

- Civil Engineering (Separate Block)
- Mechanical Engineering (Separate Block Under Construction)
- Electrical Engineering (Separate Block Under Construction)
- Computer Science & Engineering
- Electronics & Communication Engineering

=== Admissions ===
Students are admitted through counselling based on Joint Entrance Examination ranks, Himachal Pradesh Common Entrance Test (HPCET) and Management Quotas.

== Student life ==
College marks presence of students from different states of India. Most of them belong to the state of Himachal Pradesh. There is a student-led organization named UV Club (Unique Vision Club) in the college which is an extra curricular activities organizing club. HillFest is an annual two Day Technical Festival being organized by student's body of the Institute since 2011.

== See also ==
- Engineering
- Himachal Pradesh
- List of institutions of higher education in Himachal Pradesh
- Himachal Pradesh University
- AICTE
- Coalition to Uproot Ragging from Education
