= Neelu Rohmetra =

Professor Neelu Rohmetra is the first woman director of the Indian Institute of Management (IIM). At the age of 51 years, Dr Neelu Rohmetra was appointed as the new director of the IIM Sirmaur on 10 February 2017. Prof Rohmetra was a post-doctoral Commonwealth fellow in Human Resource Management at Lancaster University

== Experiences ==
Professor Rohmetra has held various academic leadership positions while serving as Professor of Management Studies in University of Jammu. She served as a faculty in The Business School at the University of Jammu for 30 years, as Rector at Kathua & Billawar Campuses for almost 5 years, and other positions.
