= Atal Medical and Research University =

Health University in India

- अटल आयुर्विज्ञान और अनुसंधान विश्वविद्यालय
- Other name: AMRU
- Motto: sarve bhavantu sukhinaḥ sarve santu nirāmayāḥ
- Type: State University
- Established: 2019; 7 years ago
- Affiliations: UGC, AIU
- Chancellor: Governor of Himachal Pradesh
- Vice-Chancellor: Dr. D. K. Verma
- Location: Ner Chowk, Mandi, Himachal Pradesh, India; 31.6082199°N 76.9204056°E
- Campus: Rural
- Website: http://amruhp.ac.in/

Atal Medical and Research University, Himachal Pradesh (AMRU) formerly known as Himachal Pradesh University of Health Sciences, is a university in Ner Chowk, Mandi, Himachal Pradesh, India. come to existence in 2019. It is a first university in the state of Himachal Pradesh to specialise in Medicine and Health sciences. Prior to its establishment, all the medical, dental, ayurveda, homeopathy, allied and healthcare, super speciality colleges were affiliated with Himachal Pradesh University. Since 2019, the University is running from Shri Lal Bahadur Shastri Medical college campus located in Ner chowk, Distt Mandi, Himachal Pradesh and has not its own campus.

Recently on the eve of independence 15 August 2025, the Chief Minister of Himachal Pradesh Sukhwinder Singh Sukhu declared Atal Medical and research university shifting from Ner chowk District Mandi to Sarkaghat in District Mandi, Himachal Pradesh

== Affiliated Medical colleges ==
=== Medical Colleges ===
- Dr. Radhakrishnan Government Medical College, Hamirpur
- Dr. Rajendra Prasad Government Medical College, Kangra
- Dr. Yashwant Singh Parmar Government Medical College, Nahan
- Indira Gandhi Medical College, Shimla
- Pt. Jawahar Lal Nehru Government Medical College And Hospital, Chamba
- Shri Lal Bahadur Shastri Government Medical College, Mandi

== Affiliated Nursing colleges ==
There are 51 nursing colleges affiliated with Atal Medical and Research University, Mandi. 4 Govt institutions and 47 are private sector nursing institutions.

== Affiliated Dental colleges ==
There are four dental Colleges affiliated with Atal medical and research university, Nerchowk, District Mandi. Government College: HP Govt. Dental college, Shimla is the Government College affiliated with the university. Private running colleges: 1. Himachal Institute of Dental Sciences, Paonta Sahib, Sirmour, Himachal Pradesh 2. Himachal Dental College, Sundernagar, Distt Mandi 3. Bhojia Dental College and Hospital, Nalagarh, Distt Solan, Himachal

== Affiliated Allied and Healthcare colleges ==
The two government colleges are running Allied and Healthcare courses in Dr. Rajendra Prasad Post Graduate Medical college, kangra and IGMC Shimla. Recently, one another standalone Govt Allied and Healthcare institution, Hamirpur, Distt Hamirpur, Himachal Pradesh has started functioning. Now, total Allied and Healthcare Institutions under AMRU are three in count. All are government institutions. Currently, no private allied and Healthcare institute has granted affiliation.

== Affiliated Ayurvedic, Sowa Rigpa and Homeopathy colleges ==
Atal Medical and Research University, Mandi, has affiliations with three Ayurvedic colleges, one Homeopathy college, and one Sowa-Rigpa college. -Rajiv Gandhi Govt. Post Graduate Ayurvedic College, Paprola, Distt. Kangra, HP -Shiva Ayurvedic college, Bilaspur, distt Bilaspur, Himachal Pradesh -Awasthi Ayurvedic College, Nalagarh, District solan, Himachal Pradesh

Homoeopathy College: Solan Homoeopathic College and Hospital, Solan, Distt Solan, Himachal Pradesh

Sowa Rigpa College Men-Tsee Khang (Sowa Rigpa) College, Dharamshala, Himachal Pradesh

== Affiliated Super Speciality College ==
There is 1 Super Speciality College, Indira Gandhi Medical College, Shimla/AIMSS, Chamiana, Shimla is affiliated with Atal Medical and Research University, Mandi.

== See also ==
- Atal Bihari Vajpayee Medical University
