= Kanairghati =

Village in Solan district, Himachal Pradesh

Kanairghati Kanair
- Village
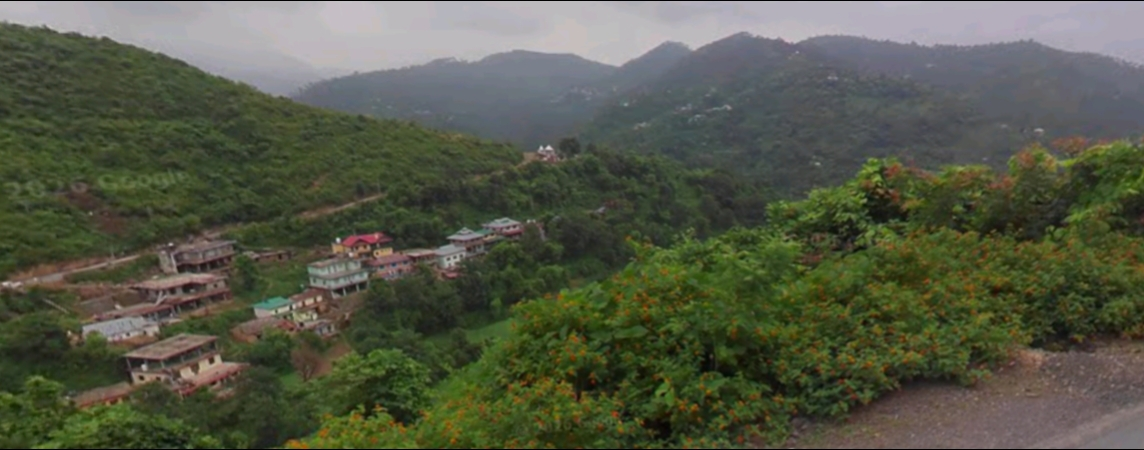
- Views of Kanairghati

- Location within Himachal Pradesh Location within India
- Coordinates: 31.096659°N 77.033890°E
- Country: India
- State: Himachal Pradesh
- District: Solan
- Tehsil: Kandaghat
- Elevation: 1,194.6 m (3,919 ft)

Languages
  - Official: Hindi
  - Regional: Mahasui (Baghati)
- PIN: 173207

Kanairghati also known as Kanair is a village in Solan district in the North Indian state of Himachal Pradesh. The village lies in Kandaghat tehsil in northern part of the Solan district.

== Geography ==
Kanairghati lies in the Kandaghat tehsil of Solan district. It is almost located at the border of Shimla district, it is around 12 kilometres (7.5 mi) from Ghanahatti. Kunihar valley starts from the village itself as gradual shift in lower elevation can be seen, as moves towards Kunihar town which is nearly 11 kilometres (6.8 mi) from the village. The flora in the village include major trees of Pine, Oak, Shirish, Neem, Safeda, etc.
