= Himachal Pradesh Technical University =

Government university in Hamirpur, India

- Type: Government
- Established: 2011; 15 years ago
- Affiliations: UGC
- Chancellor: Governor of Himachal Pradesh
- Vice-Chancellor: Abhishek Jain, IAS
- Location: Hamirpur, Himachal Pradesh, India; 31.691°N 76.488°E
- Campus: Urban
- Nickname: HPTU
- Website: www.himtu.ac.in

Himachal Pradesh Technical University, simply called HIMTU or HPTU, is a state university located in Hamirpur, Himachal Pradesh, India and established in 2011.

== History ==
The establishment of HPTU was announced by the chief minister of Himachal Pradesh Prem Kumar Dhumal. Accordingly, the Himachal Pradesh Technical University (Established and Regulation) Act, 2010 (Act No. 16 of 2010 of Himachal Pradesh Legislative Assembly was assented by the Hon’ble Governor on 28 July 2010 and on 21 August 2010 the Act came into force.

== Colleges under Himachal Pradesh Technical University ==
| Name | Type | Location |
|---|---|---|
| Jawaharlal Nehru Government Engineering College | Government College | Sundernagar, Mandi, Himachal Pradesh |
| Green Hills Engineering College | Private College | Kumarhatti, Solan, Himachal Pradesh |
| T. R. Abhilashi Memorial Institute of Engineering and Technology | Private College | Rathol, Mandi, Himachal Pradesh |
| IITT college of Engineering | Private College | Kala Amb, Solan |
| Atal Bihari Vajpayee Government Institute of Engineering and Technology | Government College | Pragtinagar, Shimla, Himachal Pradesh |
| Rajiv Gandhi Government Engineering College | Government College | Nagrota Bagwan, Kangra, Himachal Pradesh |
| L.R. Institute of Engineering & Technology | Private College | oachghat,Solan, Himachal Pradesh |
| Shiva Institute of Engineering & Technology | Private College | Bilaspur, Himachal Pradesh |
| SIRDA Institute of Engineering and Emerging Technology | Private College | Sundernagar, Mandi |
| MIT College of Engineering & Management | Private College | Barsar, Hamirpur Himachal Pradesh |
| Himalayan Institute of Engineering & Technology | Private College | Kala Amb, Sirmour, Himachal Pradesh |
| Bells Institute of Management & Technology | Private College | Shimla |
| Dev Bhoomi Institute of Engineering & Technology | Private College | Haroli, Una, Himachal Pradesh |
| Himachal Institute of Engineering & Technology | Private College | Shahpur, Kangra Himachal Pradesh |
| Vaishno College of Engineering | Private College | Nurpur, Himachal Pradesh |
| KC Group of Institutions | Private College | Pandoga, Una, Himachal Pradesh |
| Himachal Institute of Technology | Private College | Paonta Sahiba, Sirmour, Himachal Pradesh |
| Mahatama Gandhi Government Engineering College | Government College | Jeori, Shimla, Himachal Pradesh |
| Government College of Pharmacy | Government College | Rohru, Shimla, Himachal Pradesh |
