= S.D. Senior Secondary School, Shimla =

Coordinates: 31.1043558°N 77.1715677°E

S.D. Senior Secondary School
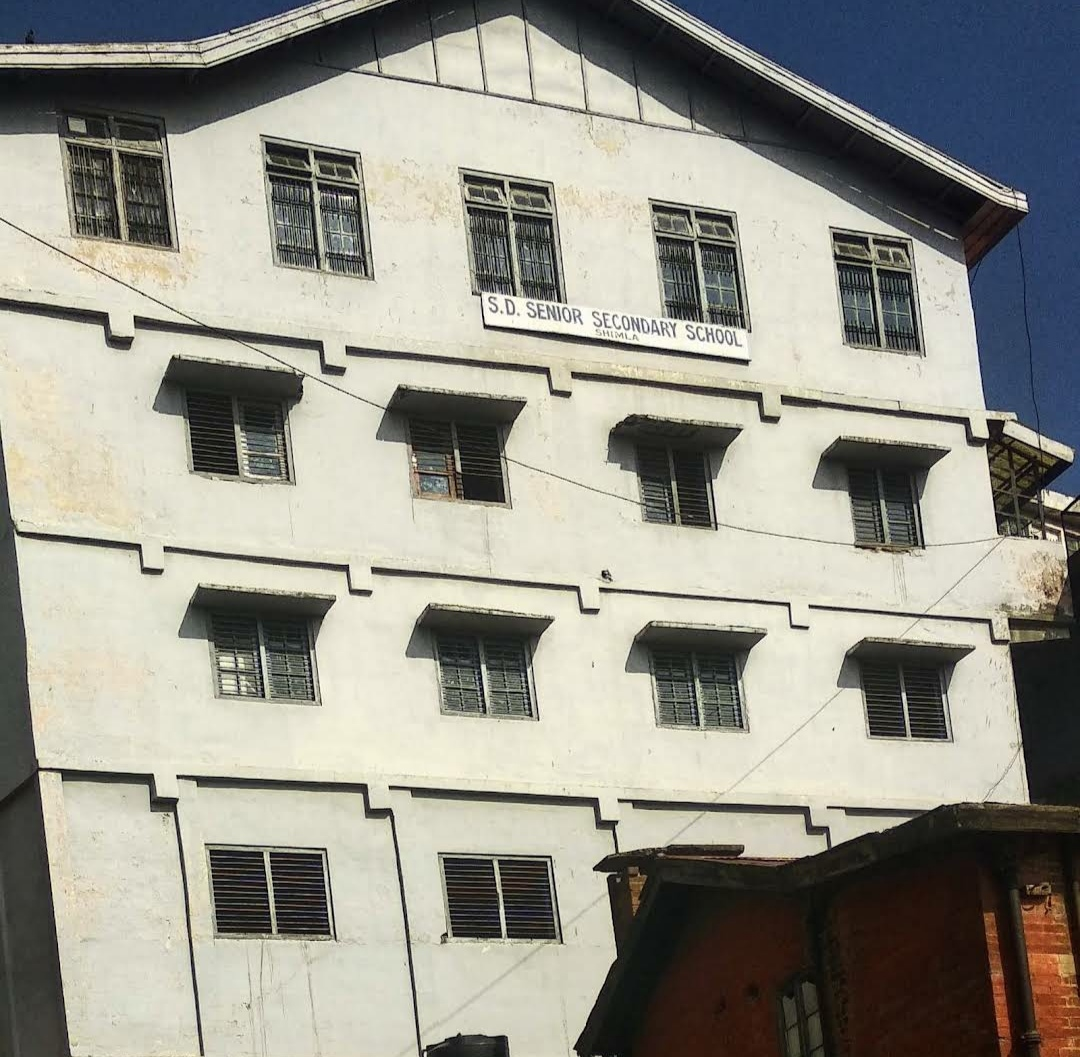
- S.D. Sr. Sec. School building side view

Location
- Ganj Bazaar; Shimla, Himachal Pradesh; India

Information
- Type: Public
- Established: 1907; 118 years ago
- School board: Himachal Pradesh Board of School Education
- Education system: Co-Educational
- Language: English
- Campus type: Urban
- Color(s): Navy Blue, White & Dark Grey

S.D. Senior Secondary School abbreviated from Sanatan Dharma Senior Secondary School is a public school located in the populous area in Ganj Bazaar near Radha Krishna Mandir in Shimla. It is one of the oldest schools in Shimla city.

== History ==
The school was established in 1907. It was founded as a religious school as its name suggests Sanatana Dharma, i.e. Hinduism, it was associated to Hinduism and used to work as an ancient Hindu school (Gurukul) but around the 1920s it became a commercial school.

== Sports ==
The school participates in many sport competitions in the state as well as national levels. The school has got many prizes in the various sports such as Basketball, Kabaddi, etc.

== Faculty and students ==
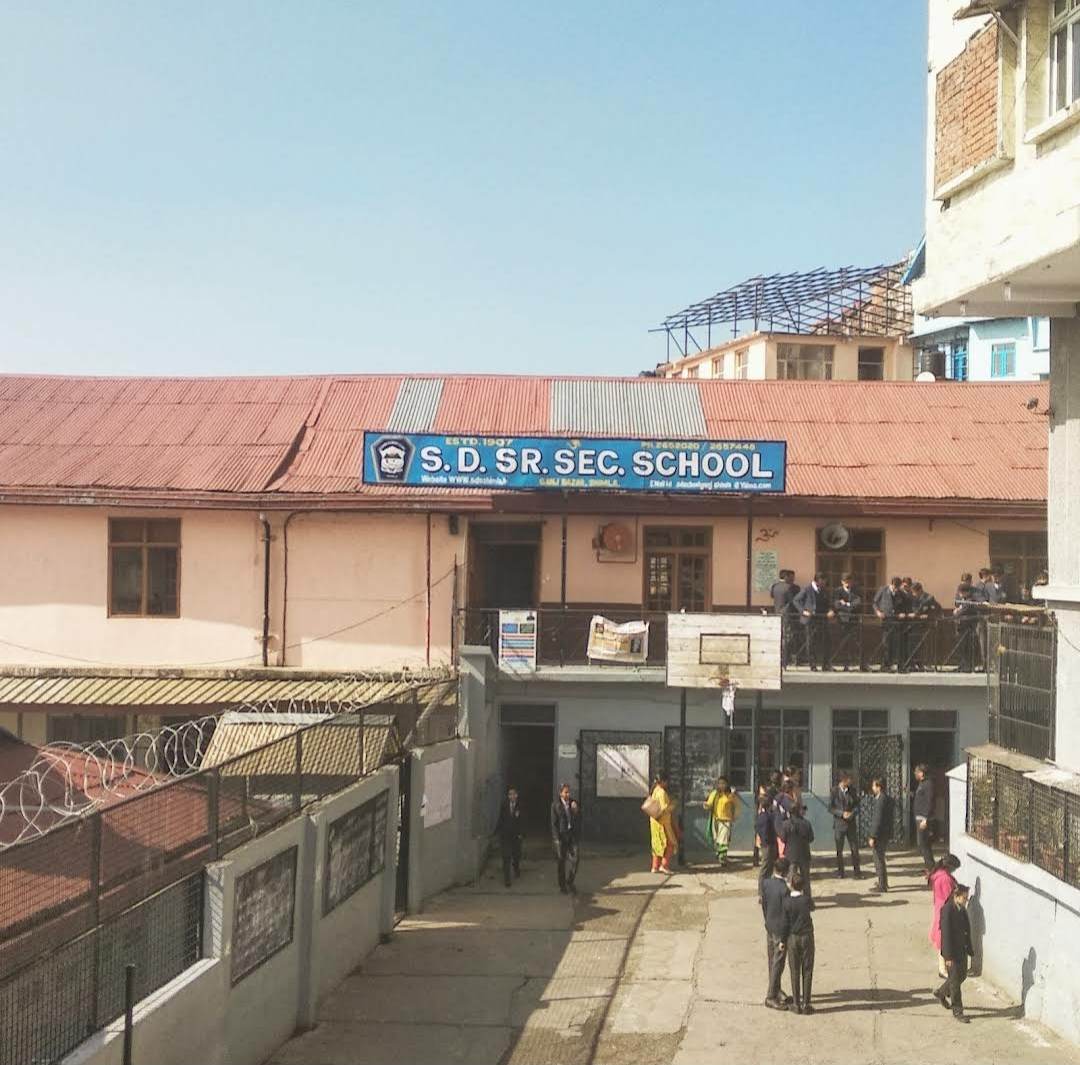
An old image of school's view from Ganj Bazaar

The school has up to 15 teachers and almost 10 other staff members. The school has two separate buildings, one for students from nursery to sixth and another is for the middle and secondary level students. Enrolment is about 1200.

== Notable alumni ==
The school has many alumni as lawyers, doctors, bureaucrats, army officers, judges, politicians, actors, etc.

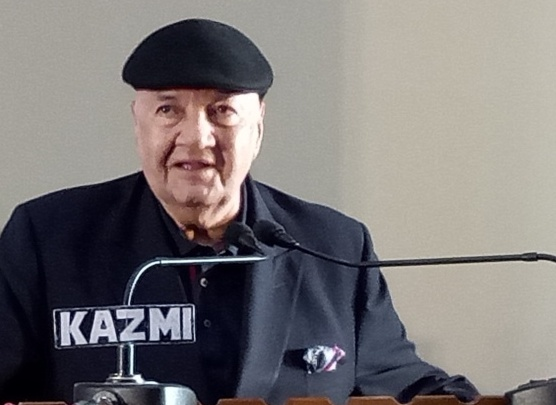
Prem Chopra

Prem Chopra, popular Indian actor
