= Atal Bihari Vajpayee Government Institute of Engineering and Technology =

College in Himachal Pradesh, India

- Other name: ABVGIET
- Motto: विद्याधनं सर्वधनप्रधानम
- Type: Government
- Established: 10 April 2011; 15 years ago
- Academic affiliations: Himachal Pradesh Technical University
- Director: Dr. Umesh C. Rathore
- Location: Pragatinagar, Kotkhai, Himachal Pradesh, India
- Campus: Rural, 123.4 Bighas
- Website: abvgiet.ac.in

Atal Bihari Vajpayee Government Institute of Engineering and Technology is an engineering college run by the government of Himachal Pradesh, in Pragatinagar, Shimla district. It is affiliated to Himachal Pradesh Technical University (HimTU) and is approved by AICTE (2012).

== History ==
Atal Bihari Vajpayee Government Institute of Engineering & Technology was established on 10 April 2011.
