= Bahra University =

- Motto: Learn. Lead. Accomplish.
- Type: Private
- Established: 2011; 15 years ago
- Founders: Bahra Educational and Charitable Society
- Affiliations: UGC, BCI, PCI
- Chancellor: Gurvinder Singh Bahra
- Vice-Chancellor: Krishna Kant Dave
- Location: Waknaghat, Himachal Pradesh, India; 31.004°N 77.090°E
- Website: www.bahrauniversity.edu.in

Bahra University is a private university located in Waknaghat, Solan district, Himachal Pradesh, India. The university was established in 2011 by the Rayat-Bahra Group (registered as Bahra Educational and Charitable Society) through the Bahra University (Establishment and Regulation) Act, 2010. The Rayat-Bahra Group also established Rayat Bahra University and other education institutes including Rayat Institute of Engineering & Information Technology.

== Campus ==
The university is set up on a 25 acres (0.10 km^{2}) residential campus. Apart from teaching facilities the campus holds a hostel, a medical centre, a gym, a bank and a mess.

== Schools ==
The university has the following seven schools:

- School of Engineering
- School of Management
- School of Law
- School of Pharmaceutical Science
- School of Physiotherapy
- School of Hospitality and Tourism
- School of Basic Sciences

== Approval ==
Like all universities in India, Bahra University is recognised by the University Grants Commission (UGC), which has also sent an expert committee. The programmes by the School of Law are approved by the Bar Council of India (BCI). The School of Pharmaceutical Science is approved by the Pharmacy Council of India (PCI).
