= Dr. Radhakrishnan Government Medical College =

College in Himachal Pradesh, India

Radhakrishnan Government Medical College, Hamirpur
- Type: Medical college and Hospital
- Established: 2018; 8 years ago
- Affiliations: Atal Medical and Research University, NMC
- Principal: Dr. Ramesh Bharti
- Location: MGJG+6GF, Agriculture Colony, Hamirpur, Himachal Pradesh 177001, Hamirpur, Himachal Pradesh, India; 31.681°N 76.526°E
- Website: http://www.rgmchamirpur.org/

Dr. Radhakrishnan Government Medical College, Hamirpur is a full-fledged tertiary Medical College in Hamirpur, Himachal Pradesh. It was established in the year 2018. The college imparts the degree of Bachelor of Medicine and Surgery (MBBS). The college is affiliated to Atal Medical and Research University, Mandi, Himachal Pradesh and is recognised by the National Medical Commission (NMC). The selection to the college is done on the basis of merit through National Eligibility cum Entrance Test (UG). The College has an annual intake of 120 undergraduates. The campus of the Medical College and Hospital is under construction in ranges located along Hamirpur-Nadaun Road. The college started its MBBS course from August 2018.

== Courses ==
Hamirpur Medical College undertakes the education and training of students MBBS courses.
