= Climate of Himachal Pradesh =

There is a huge variation in the climatic conditions of Himachal Pradesh due to variation in altitude (360–6500 metres). The climate varies from hot and sub-humid tropical (450–900 metres) in the southern low tracts, warm and temperate (900–1800 metres), cool and temperate (1800–2400 metres) and cold glacial and alpine (2400–4800 metres) in the northern and eastern high elevated mountain. Pollution is affecting the climate of almost all the states of India.

By October, nights and mornings are very cold. Snowfall at elevations of nearly 3,000 metres or 9,800 feet is about 3 metres or 120 inches and lasts from a December start to March end. Above 4,500 metres or 14,800 feet lies perpetual snow.

The spring season starts from mid February to mid April. The weather is pleasant and comfortable in this season. The rainy season starts at the end of the month of June. The landscape lushes green and fresh. During the season streams and natural springs are replenished. The heavy rains in July and August cause erosion, floods and landslides. Of all the state districts, Dharamshala receives the highest rainfall, nearly about 3,400 millimetres or 130 inches. Spiti is the driest area of the state (rainfall below 200 millimetres or 8 inches), because it is enclosed by high mountains on all sides.

Altitude	Up to 800 metres (2,600 ft)	800 to 1,600 metres (2,600 to 5,200 ft)	1,600 to 2,700 metres (5,200 to 8,900 ft)	2,700 to 3,600 metres (8,900 to 11,800 ft)
Type of area	Valley areas and foothills	Hilly and mountain ranges	Alpine zone	Lahaul, Spiti and Kinnaur range
Climatic conditions	Subtropical	Slightly warm temperature	Cool temperature with humidity	Dry and extremely cold conditions
Precipitation	1,500 millimetres or 60 inches	1,500 to 3,000 millimetres or 60 to 120 inches	1,000 to 1,500 millimetres or 40 to 60 inches	500 millimetres or 20 inches
% of total geographical area	30%	10%	25%	35%
% of total cultivated area	56%	30%	10%	5%
Annual Temperature range (degree celsius)	-2 to 45	-5 to 40	-10 to 32	-20 to 25
Average Annual Temperature (degree celsius)	20 to 22	15 to 20	10 to 16	5 to 10

== Rainfall ==
The average annual rainfall is 1,251 millimetres or 49 inches. The rainy season starts at the end of the month of June. The landscape lushes green and fresh. During the seasonal streams and natural springs are replenished. The heavy rains in July and August cause erosion, floods, and landslides. Of all the state districts, Dharamshala receives the highest precipitation, nearly about 3,400 millimetres or 130 inches. Spiti is the driest area of the state with precipitation below 200 millimetres or 8 inches.

== Climate data ==
Climate data for Dharamshala (1991–2020 normals, extremes 1951–present)
Month	Jan	Feb	Mar	Apr	May	Jun	Jul	Aug	Sep	Oct	Nov	Dec	Year
Record high °C (°F)	24.7 (76.5)	28.0 (82.4)	33.4 (92.1)	36.2 (97.2)	38.6 (101.5)	38.6 (101.5)	42.7 (108.9)	37.8 (100.0)	34.8 (94.6)	34.6 (94.3)	28.6 (83.5)	27.2 (81.0)	42.7 (108.9)
Mean daily maximum °C (°F)	16.0 (60.8)	17.8 (64.0)	22.5 (72.5)	26.9 (80.4)	30.8 (87.4)	30.9 (87.6)	27.5 (81.5)	26.6 (79.9)	26.8 (80.2)	25.6 (78.1)	22.0 (71.6)	18.4 (65.1)	24.4 (75.9)
Mean daily minimum °C (°F)	5.9 (42.6)	7.3 (45.1)	10.7 (51.3)	14.8 (58.6)	19.0 (66.2)	20.5 (68.9)	19.7 (67.5)	19.2 (66.6)	17.8 (64.0)	14.2 (57.6)	10.2 (50.4)	7.1 (44.8)	13.9 (57.0)
Record low °C (°F)	−1.9 (28.6)	−1.6 (29.1)	2.4 (36.3)	7.3 (45.1)	8.4 (47.1)	12.6 (54.7)	14.3 (57.7)	14.1 (57.4)	11.2 (52.2)	8.0 (46.4)	4.8 (40.6)	−1.0 (30.2)	−1.9 (28.6)
Average rainfall mm (inches)	83.6 (3.29)	128.3 (5.05)	111.3 (4.38)	65.7 (2.59)	72.4 (2.85)	279.0 (10.98)	859.0 (33.82)	942.3 (37.10)	377.7 (14.87)	52.6 (2.07)	18.8 (0.74)	36.6 (1.44)	3,027.3 (119.19)
Average rainy days	4.5	6.2	6.1	5.1	4.8	10.7	22.0	23.0	13.9	2.6	1.2	2.2	102.3
Average relative humidity (%) (at 17:30 IST)	67	67	58	55	50	59	81	85	78	65	64	66	66
Source: India Meteorological Department

Climate data for Shimla (Köppen Cwb)
Month	Jan	Feb	Mar	Apr	May	Jun	Jul	Aug	Sep	Oct	Nov	Dec	Year
Record high °C (°F)	21.4 (70.5)	22.6 (72.7)	25.8 (78.4)	29.6 (85.3)	32.4 (90.3)	31.5 (88.7)	28.9 (84.0)	27.8 (82.0)	28.6 (83.5)	25.6 (78.1)	23.5 (74.3)	20.5 (68.9)	32.4 (90.3)
Mean daily maximum °C (°F)	10.9 (51.6)	11.9 (53.4)	15.8 (60.4)	20.5 (68.9)	24.1 (75.4)	24.8 (76.6)	22.6 (72.7)	22.0 (71.6)	22.1 (71.8)	20.3 (68.5)	16.7 (62.1)	13.5 (56.3)	18.8 (65.8)
Mean daily minimum °C (°F)	2.8 (37.0)	3.7 (38.7)	7.0 (44.6)	11.4 (52.5)	14.6 (58.3)	16.2 (61.2)	15.9 (60.6)	15.5 (59.9)	14.1 (57.4)	11.1 (52.0)	7.8 (46.0)	5.1 (41.2)	10.4 (50.7)
Record low °C (°F)	−10.6 (12.9)	−8.5 (16.7)	−6.1 (21.0)	−1.3 (29.7)	1.4 (34.5)	7.8 (46.0)	9.4 (48.9)	10.6 (51.1)	5.0 (41.0)	0.2 (32.4)	−1.1 (30.0)	−12.2 (10.0)	−12.2 (10.0)
Average rainfall mm (inches)	66.4 (2.61)	75.3 (2.96)	81.2 (3.20)	60.8 (2.39)	90.3 (3.56)	181.9 (7.16)	329.8 (12.98)	320.4 (12.61)	142.3 (5.60)	36.7 (1.44)	18.4 (0.72)	24.2 (0.95)	1,427.7 (56.21)
Average snowfall cm (inches)	42 (17)	43 (17)	7 (2.8)	0 (0)	0 (0)	0 (0)	0 (0)	0 (0)	0 (0)	0 (0)	0 (0)	7 (2.8)	99 (39.6)
Average rainy days	4.2	5.6	6.1	4.8	7.0	9.6	17.0	15.7	8.2	2.3	1.3	2.0	83.7
Average snowy days	4.2	4.2	1.4	0.0	0.0	0.0	0.0	0.0	0.0	0.0	0.1	1.3	11.2
Average relative humidity (%) (at 17:30 IST)	67	65	57	47	48	62	85	88	79	63	61	60	65
Average dew point °C (°F)	8 (46)	12 (54)	15 (59)	16 (61)	19 (66)	23 (73)	26 (79)	26 (79)	24 (75)	19 (66)	13 (55)	10 (50)	18 (64)
Average ultraviolet index	3	3	5	6	6	6	6	5	5	4	4	3	5
Source 1: India Meteorological Department (snow 1990–2010) Time and Date (dewpoints, 2005-2015)
Source 2: Weather Atlas

Climate data for Sundar Nagar (Köppen Cwa)
Month	Jan	Feb	Mar	Apr	May	Jun	Jul	Aug	Sep	Oct	Nov	Dec	Year
Record high °C (°F)	27.7 (81.9)	30.5 (86.9)	35.0 (95.0)	39.9 (103.8)	41.4 (106.5)	42.1 (107.8)	39.2 (102.6)	35.1 (95.2)	34.1 (93.4)	33.6 (92.5)	31.2 (88.2)	26.8 (80.2)	42.1 (107.8)
Mean daily maximum °C (°F)	17.8 (64.0)	19.8 (67.6)	24.7 (76.5)	30.1 (86.2)	33.8 (92.8)	34.1 (93.4)	30.9 (87.6)	30.2 (86.4)	30.3 (86.5)	28.5 (83.3)	24.3 (75.7)	19.5 (67.1)	27.0 (80.6)
Mean daily minimum °C (°F)	2.8 (37.0)	5.1 (41.2)	9.0 (48.2)	13.0 (55.4)	17.1 (62.8)	20.0 (68.0)	21.8 (71.2)	21.5 (70.7)	18.6 (65.5)	11.8 (53.2)	6.3 (43.3)	3.0 (37.4)	12.5 (54.5)
Record low °C (°F)	−2.7 (27.1)	−1.9 (28.6)	−0.4 (31.3)	0.5 (32.9)	9.6 (49.3)	11.4 (52.5)	16.5 (61.7)	15.1 (59.2)	10.2 (50.4)	5.4 (41.7)	1.0 (33.8)	−1.6 (29.1)	−2.7 (27.1)
Average rainfall mm (inches)	61.9 (2.44)	72.4 (2.85)	78.1 (3.07)	50.5 (1.99)	83.1 (3.27)	176.6 (6.95)	348.8 (13.73)	314.3 (12.37)	137.1 (5.40)	35.7 (1.41)	13.2 (0.52)	35.5 (1.40)	1,407.4 (55.41)
Average rainy days	4.0	5.4	5.8	3.9	6.3	9.2	14.9	13.8	7.1	1.8	1.0	2.1	75.4
Average relative humidity (%) (at 17:30 IST)	54	48	42	34	37	49	71	76	69	54	53	57	54
Source: India Meteorological Department

== Average Annual Temperature by Districts ==
District	Avg Annual Temp (°C)	Annual Temperature Range (°C)	Coldest Place (°C)	Hottest Place (°C)
Lahaul & Spiti	~ 5	-30 to 30	Komic/Hikkim (-30)	Kaza (32)
Kinnaur	~ 8	-20 to 30	Chitkul (-20)	Reckong Peo (30)
Chamba	~ 15	-20 to 40	Pangi (-20)	Chamba (42)
Kullu	~ 14	-20 to 40	Atal Tunnel (-20)	Bhuntar (42)
Shimla	~ 15	-10 to 35	Narkanda (-10)	Shimla Urban (32)
Solan	~ 18	-5 to 45	Karol peak, Solan (-5)	Baddi (46)
Kangra	~ 20	-5 to 40	Bada Bhangal (-15)	Kangra Plains (43)
Mandi	~ 18	-10 to 40	Shikari Devi (-15)	Sunder Nagar (43)
Sirmaur	~ 20	-10 to 40	Churdhar (-20)	Paonta Sahib (43)
Bilaspur	~ 21	-2 to 42	Bandla Hill (-5)	Bilaspur (43)
Hamirpur	~ 21	-2 to 40	Awah Devi (-3)	Neri (46)
Una	~ 22	-3 to 45	Una (-6)	Una (46)

All the coldest or hottest places in the list are habitable settlements permanently or temporarily. Extremes in some of the other places like mountain passes can be even lower. Passes like Shinkula (5050m), Baralacha (4850m), Rohtang Pass (4000m), Sach Pass (4450m), Kunzum (4500m) can sometimes face extreme temperatures like -30 to -40 degrees or lower.
