= Himachal Seb Utpadak Sangh =

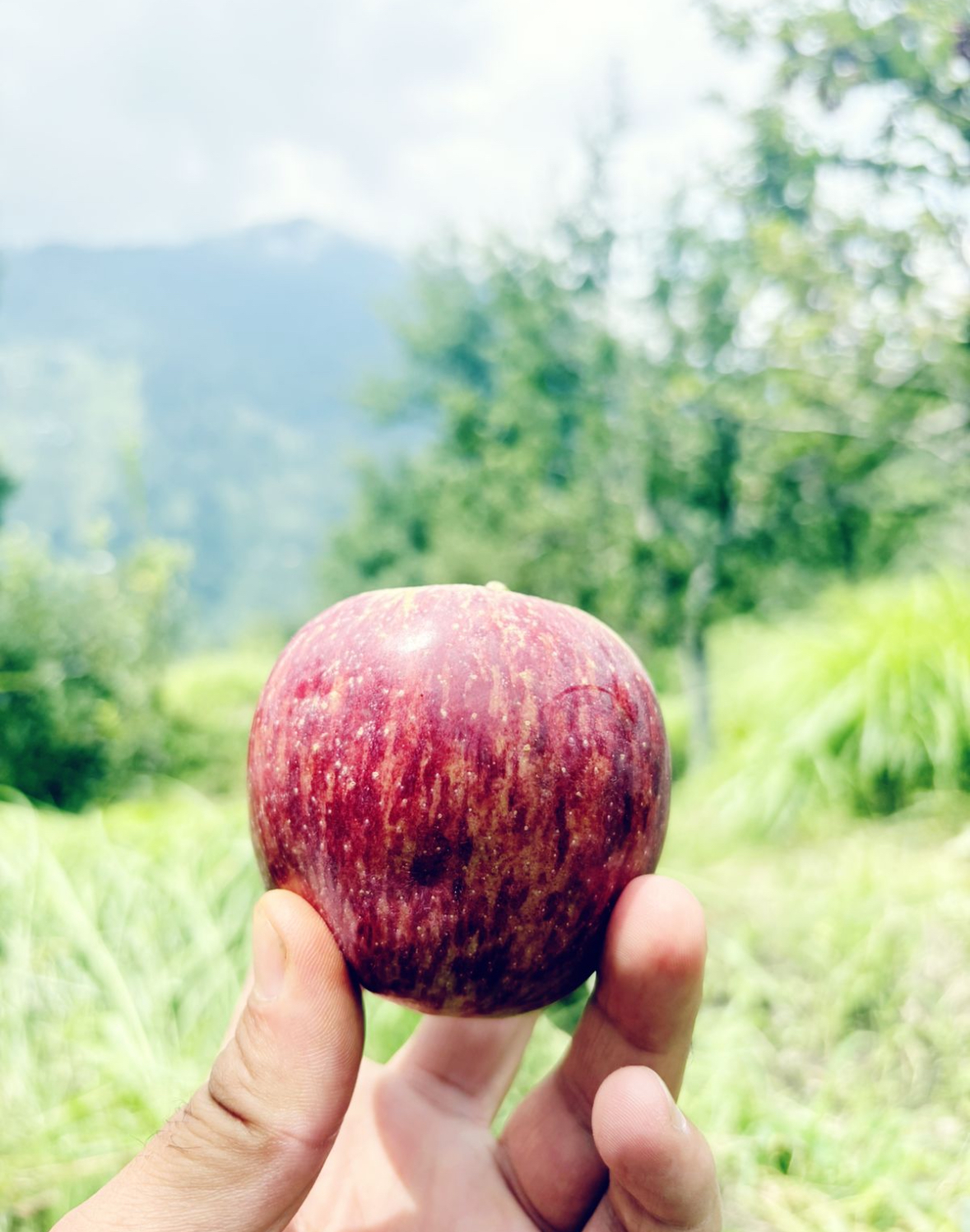
Himachali Apple

Himachal Seb Utpadak Sangh (Hindi: हिमाचल सेब उत्पादक संघ, 'Himachal Apple Growers Union') is a farmers' organization in the Indian state of Himachal Pradesh. The organization is opposed to neoliberalism. As of 2013, Rakesh Singha is the President of the organization. As of 2012, its secretary was Sanjay Chauhan. The organization was founded at a convention in Shimla on 14 May 2011, with participation from farmers from Shimla district, Kullu district, Mandi district and Kinnaur district.
