= Indian Institute of Management Sirmaur =

Autonomous public business school in Sirmaur, Himachal Pradesh, India

- Motto: Knowledge. Leadership.
- Type: Public business school
- Established: 4 September 2015; 10 years ago
- Affiliations: Indian Institutes of Management
- Budget: ₹19.10 crore (US$2.0 million)
- Chairperson: Ajay S. Shriram
- Director: Dr. Prafulla Agnihotri
- Location: Dhaula Kuan, Sirmaur, Himachal Pradesh, 173021, India
- Campus: Urban
- Website: www.iimsirmaur.ac.in

Indian Institute of Management Sirmaur (IIM Sirmaur or IIM S) one of India's premier institute is an autonomous public business school located in Sirmaur, Himachal Pradesh. The institute, set up by the Government of India, is one of the twenty-two Indian Institutes of Management (IIMs). IIM Sirmaur has been recognized as an Institute of National Importance by the Government of India in 2017.

The institute conducts academic activities in the field of management education covering research, teaching, training, consulting and intellectual infrastructure development.

== History ==
IIM Sirmaur was founded in 2015. The institution started the first batch of its Post Graduate Programme (PGP) in management from 4 September 2015.

== Campus ==
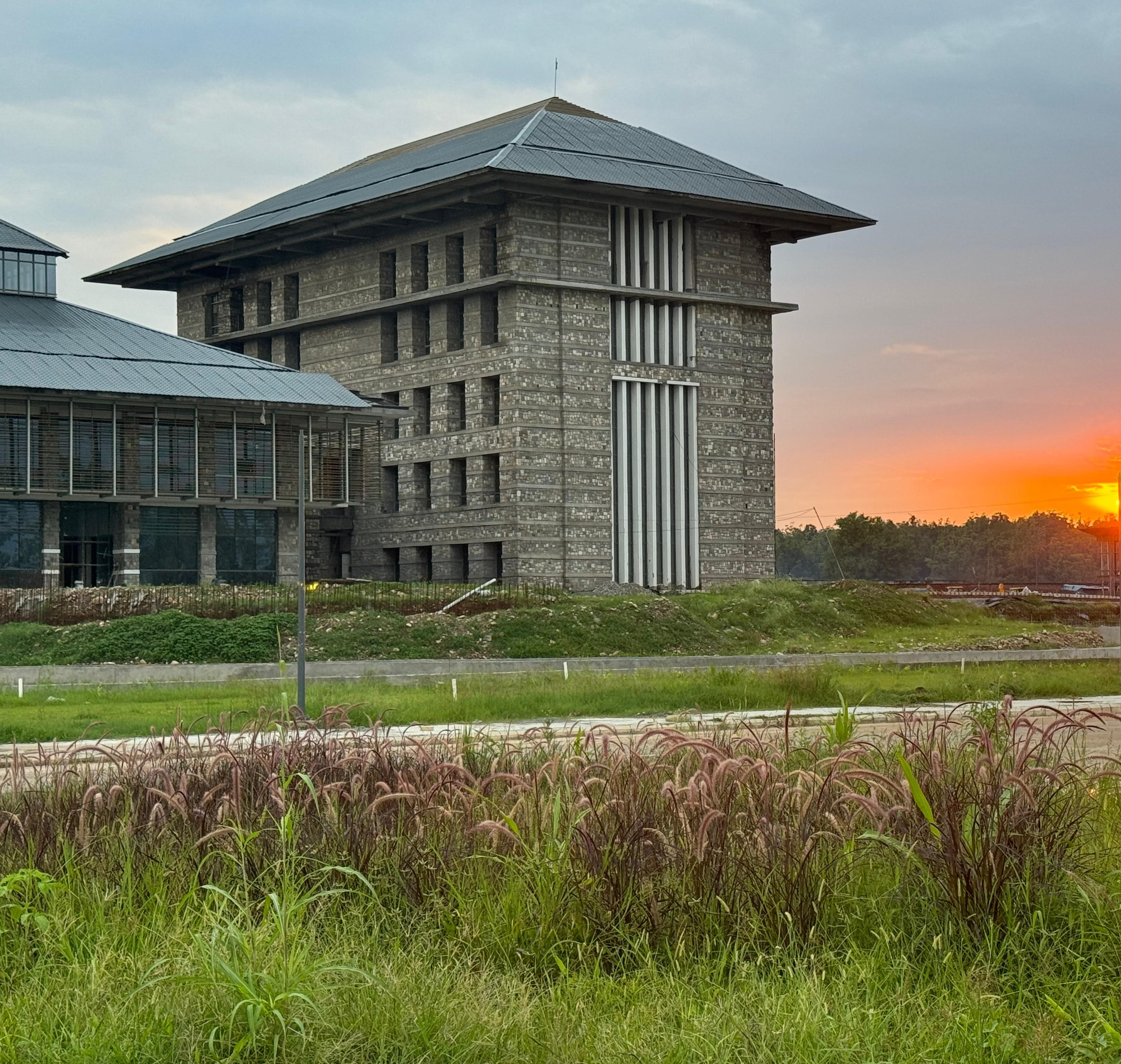

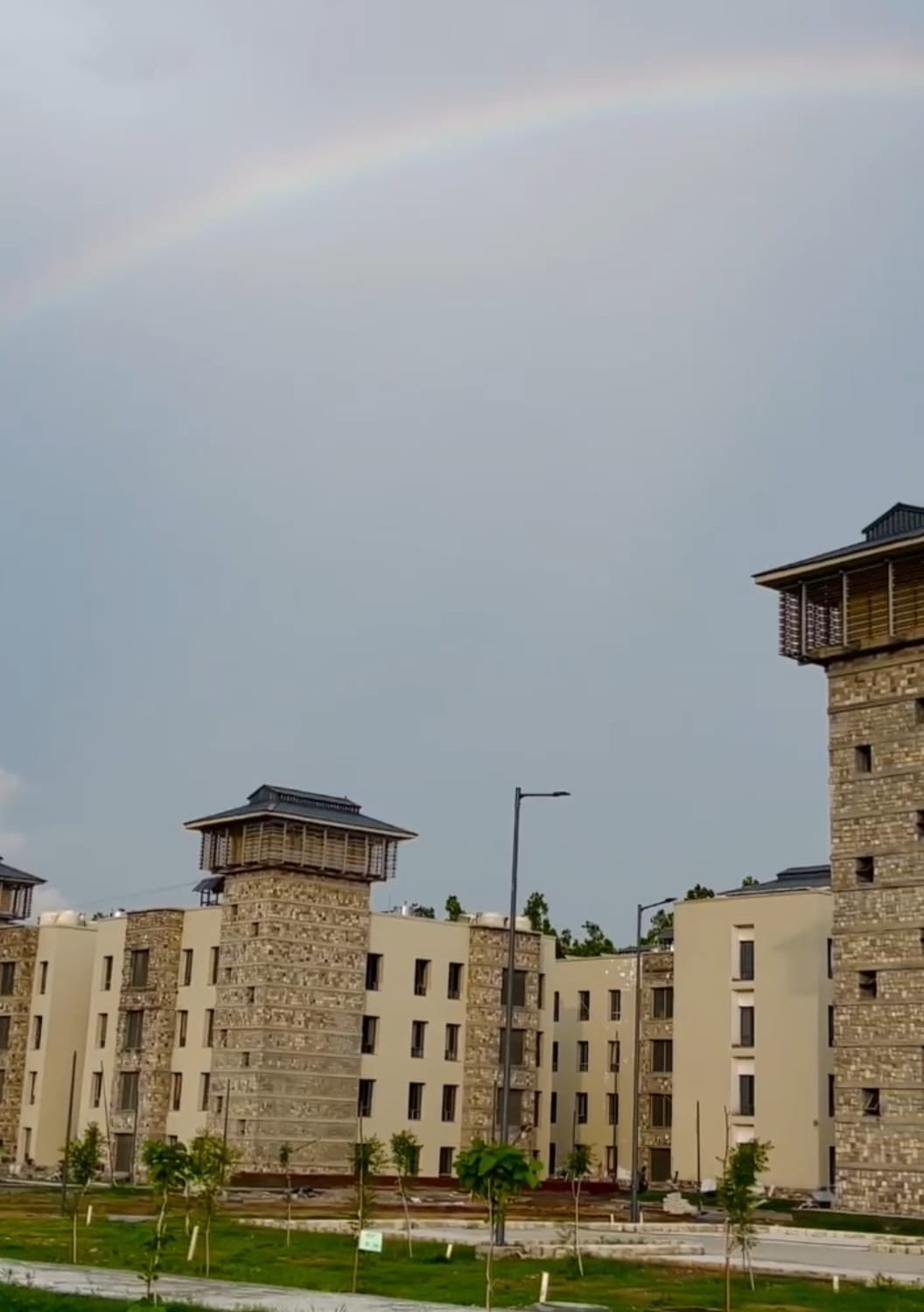

The campus of IIM Sirmaur is at Dhaula Kuan, District Sirmaur. Paonta Sahib is an industrial town in the south of Sirmaur district. The campus is more than Two hundred acres.

== Library ==
IIM Sirmaur has an in-house library equipped with both print and electronic resources. The library has around 650 books and a subscription of 22 periodicals and 5 newspapers in hard copies.

== Organisation and administration ==
In February 2017, Dr. Neelu Rohmetra of University of Jammu was appointed as the founding director of Indian Institute of Management Sirmaur.

== Academics ==
IIM Sirmaur previously offered Post Graduate Diploma in Management. It is a two-year postgraduate management program, which is equivalent to MBA. Since the IIM Act, they have been offering the regular Master of Business Administration degree. This is a two-year, regular, full-time residential programme. Admission to the MBA and MBA-TM course of IIM Sirmaur is conducted each year through Common Admission Test (CAT). IIM Sirmaur is the first IIM that has started offering a major in Tourism which is one of the best for industry specific management consulting and other roles.
