= Jawaharlal Nehru Government Engineering College =

College in Himachal Pradesh, India

- जवाहरलाल नेहरू राजकीय अभियांत्रिकी महाविद्यालय
- Bringing innovation to lives
- Other name: JNGEC
- Motto: उद्योग: सर्वार्थ साधकम
- Motto in English: "Industrialization solves every thing"
- Type: Undergraduate
- Established: 2006; 20 years ago
- Academic affiliations: HimTU, AICTE
- Dean: Ritesh Kaundal
- Director: Rajeev Khanduja
- Students: 1400
- Location: Sundernagar, Himachal Pradesh, India; 31.5160°N 76.8784°E
- Campus: Rural, 2.6726 hectares (6.604 acres)
- Website: www.jngec.ac.in

Jawaharlal Nehru Government Engineering College, Sundernagar (JNGEC or GEC, Sundernagar) is a government-funded engineering institute run by the government of Himachal Pradesh, in Sundernagar, Mandi district. It is affiliated to Himachal Pradesh Technical University (HimTU) and is approved by AICTE(2006).

Location of JNGEC sundernagar

== History ==
Its first batch graduated in June 2010. Under former chief minister Virbhadra Singh the establishment of JNGEC in 2006 was approved. It was initially proposed to start by only offering a mechanical engineering program for session 2006–2007 but later textile engineering was added. The institution was initially affiliated to Himachal Pradesh University, Shimla. The first 05 batches were affiliated to Himachal Pradesh University i.e. 2010-2014 batch was the last to get degrees from Himachal Pradesh University, Shimla. The construction of the college is going on in stages. Textile Engineering at JNGEC Sundernagar offers the best placements in leading Textile companies across the country.

== Campus ==
The campus is 2 kilometres (1.2 mi) away from NH-21 (Chandigarh to Manali) which is 2 km from the Sundernagar bus stand. The campus is spread over 2.6726 hectare of land. The institute has five blocks: Administrative ‘A’ block, academic blocks ‘B’, ‘C’, 'D', and Workshop Block 'E'. The Boys Hostel of the institute was started in 2023 and the construction of Girls Hostel is under process.

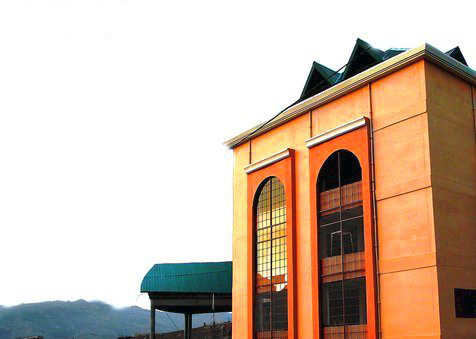
Administrative Block, JNGEC, Sundernagar

== Academics ==
=== Departments ===
The college has six Academic Departments.

- Applied Science and Humanities
- Civil Engineering
- Electronics and Communication Engineering
- Mechanical Engineering
- Textile Engineering
- CSE (AI&ML)

The college offers 4-year B.Tech degree in Mechanical Engineering, Electronics and Communication Engineering, Civil Engineering, Textile Engineering and CSE (AI&ML). The college also offers 2-year M.Tech. in Civil Engineering (Construction Engineering & Management).

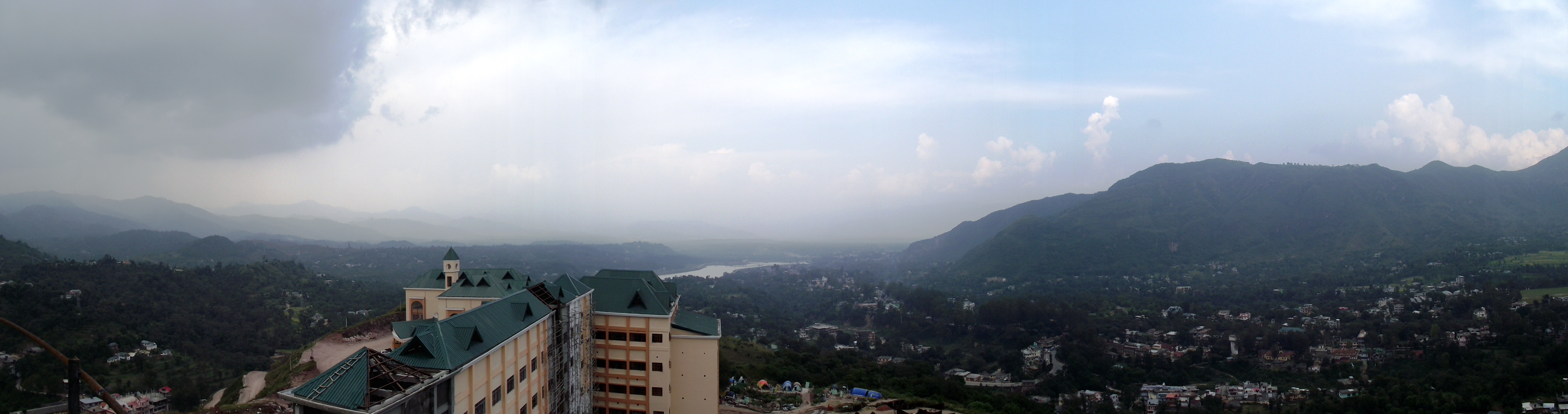
View of Sundernagar from JNGEC.

=== Admissions ===
Undergraduate admissions are made on the marks and ranks obtained by the candidates in JEE MAIN through central counseling and also through CET conducted by the Himachal Pradesh Technical University, Hamirpur. 85% of total seats are reserved for Himachal bona fide candidates and 15% to all-India quota.

The college admits 240 students with 60 students in each department. In addition to that 20% seats in each department are allotted to lateral entry students and 5% over and above the sanctioned intake under the tuition fee waiver scheme.

There are three rounds of subsequent counseling. If the seats still fall vacant after the two rounds, they are filled on the basis of marks obtained in 10+2 or any equivalent examination, according to the 200 marks roster as approved by the Himachal Pradesh government. Lateral entry seats are filled on merit basis and candidates with a diploma in requisite field or an BS degree are eligible for these seats.

== Student life ==
=== Twask ===
Twask is the annual cultural fest of JNGEC Sundernagar. It is a three-day long event held towards the start of May. Started in 2012 by bunch of enthusiast JNGECians. It is the most anticipated event of the college, organized at the state level. The festival is a forum for young minds to interact, share and discuss and showcase their new innovative ideas. There are numerous activities for participation and this 3 days fest is loved and enjoyed by students.

=== Reflexia ===
Reflexia is the annual college magazine which is published and distributed to the students of Jawaharlal Nehru Government Engineering College. Reflexia holds a part of students skills, talent, and college activities. This version of the magazine is a benchmark in itself and covers every aspect of college life of a JNGECian. This important part of college was established with the hard work and enthusiasm of few volunteering JNGECians and is now continued by some more Volunteers of Literary Club. The first edition of the magazine was released in the year 2014. The next versions were released in the following years: 2016: Celebrating ten years & the theme being The Major Landscapes of India. 2017: Theme of Battle between Virtues and Vices. 2018: Abstract Theme 2019: Abstract Theme

=== Clubs and committees ===
The college has following Clubs and Committees.

- NCC
- Cultural Committee
- Sports Committee
- Photography Committee
- Eco Club
- NSS Club
- Technical Clubs
- Literary Club
- Deco Club
