= Dr. Rajendra Prasad Government Medical College =

Public medical college and hospital in India

- Other name: Tanda Medical College
- Type: Public
- Established: 1996; 30 years ago
- Affiliations: Atal Medical and Research University
- Principal: Milap Sharma
- Location: Tanda, Kangra, Himachal Pradesh, India; 32.099°N 76.299°E
- Website: www.rpgmc.ac.in

Dr. Rajendra Prasad Government Medical College (DRPGMC) is a public medical college and hospital located in district Kangra of Himachal Pradesh.

== History ==
The hospital's history dates back to 28 October 1952 when Mr.Chandulal Trivedi, the Governor of Punjab, on behalf of Rai Bahadur Jodhamal Kuthiala, a philanthropist, laid the foundation stone of a TB sanatorium. The TB sanatorium was inaugurated by Dr.Rajendra Prasad, the first President of India, on 21 May 1958. The 200 bed hospital was a gift from Rai Bahadur to the Kangra residents. The foundation stone for the hospital was laid by the then Chief Minister Sh. Virbhadra Singh on 23 October 1996. The Foundation Stone for the TB sanatorium was laid by on 25 February 2022 with a hospital facility at Dharmasala. The new hospital was dedicated to the public by the Chief Minister on 3 October 2008. The college was recognised by the Medical Council of India(MCI) provisionally on 24 February 2005 and received permanent recognition in January 2010.
