= Chitkara University, Punjab =

University in Punjab, India

Coordinates: 30°30′59″N 76°39′31″E

Chitkara University
- Former names: Chitkara Institute of Engineering and Technology
- Type: Private
- Established: 2010 ; 15 years ago
- Accreditation: NAAC (A+)
- Affiliations: UGC, NAAC, COA, PCI, NCTE, INC, NCHMCT, AUAP, IET
- Chancellor: Ashok Kumar Chitkara
- Vice-Chancellor: Sandhir Sharma
- Academic staff: 100+
- Students: 2,500+
- Postgraduates: 1,000+
- Location: Rajpura, Punjab, India
- Campus: Urban
- Website: www.chitkara.edu.in

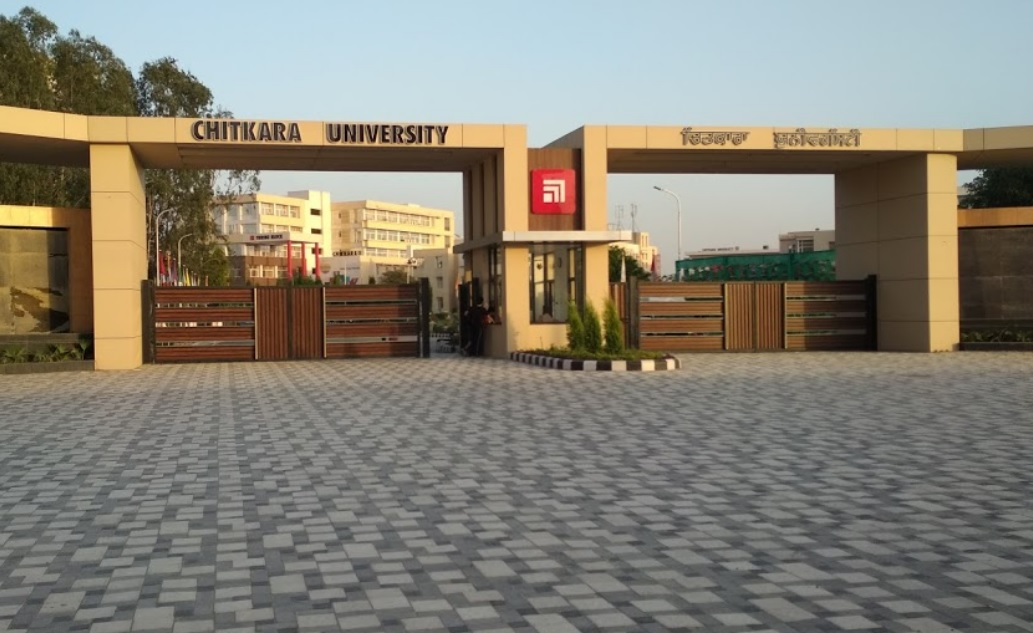
Chitkara University, Punjab - Campus Main Gate

Chitkara University is a private university located in Rajpura, Punjab, India. It offers undergraduate programs, post-graduate program and doctoral programs in fields of engineering, management, pharmacy, health sciences, nursing, hospitality, art & design and education. It was established and is managed by the Chitkara Educational Trust.

== History ==
Chitkara University, Punjab started its way as Chitkara Institute of Engineering and Technology established in 2002 and affiliated to Punjab Technical University. The university was established in 2010 after being granted university status with the passing of The Chitkara University Act, 2008 in 2009.

Chitkara University's 70-acre main campus is located in Jansla Village, Rajpura, Punjab, along the Chandigarh-Patiala National Highway (NH-64), which is 33.1 km away from Chandigarh.

== Academics ==
=== Academic programmes ===
Chitkara University offers a wide range of academic programmes across a variety of disciplines, including engineering, technology, business, health sciences, pharmacy, design, and media.

Some of academic programmes offered by Chitkara University include:

- Bachelor of Engineering (B.E.)
- Bachelor of Business Administration (BBA)
- Bachelor of Pharmacy (B.Pharm.)
- Bachelor of Design (B.Des.)
- Bachelor of Commerce (B.Com.)
- Bachelor of Nursing (B.Sc. Nursing)
- Bachelor of Optometry (B.Optom.)
- Bachelor of Arts (B.A.) in Economics, Journalism and Mass Communication, Film and Television (BJMC)

Chitkara University also offers a number of postgraduate programmes, including:

- Master of Business Administration (MBA)
- Master of Engineering (M.E.)
- Master of Pharmacy (M.Pharm.)
- Master of Arts (M.A.) in Journalism and Mass Communication
- Master of Nursing (M.Sc. Nursing)
- Master of Design (M.Des.)

Chitkara University also offers Doctor of Philosophy (Ph.D.) in various fields.

=== Affiliations ===
Chitkara University is recognized by the University Grants Commission (UGC) & National Assessment and Accreditation Council (NAAC). Relevant programmes are approved by the Council of Architecture (COA), Pharmacy Council of India (PCI), National Council for Teacher Education (NCTE), Indian Nursing Council (INC), Institution of Engineering & Technology (IET), and National Council for Hotel Management and Catering Technology (NCHMCT).

University and college rankings

General – international
- QS (World) (2025): 1201-1400
- QS (Asia) (2024): 501-550

General – India
- NIRF (Universities) (2024): 90

Engineering – India
- NIRF (2024): 94

Medical – India
- NIRF (2024): 54

Pharmacy – India
- NIRF (2024): 19

Architecture – India
- NIRF (2024): 35

=== Rankings ===
Chitkara University was ranked 78th among universities in India by National Institutional Ranking Framework (NIRF) in 2025, 16th in the Pharmacy ranking, 38th in the Architecture ranking, 78th in the Management ranking and 89th in the Engineering ranking.

Internationally, the university was ranked in the 501-550 band among universities in Asia by QS World University Rankings (Asia) in 2025 (143rd in South Asia) and 1201-1400 band among universities in the World by QS World University Rankings in 2025.

== Schools and institutes ==
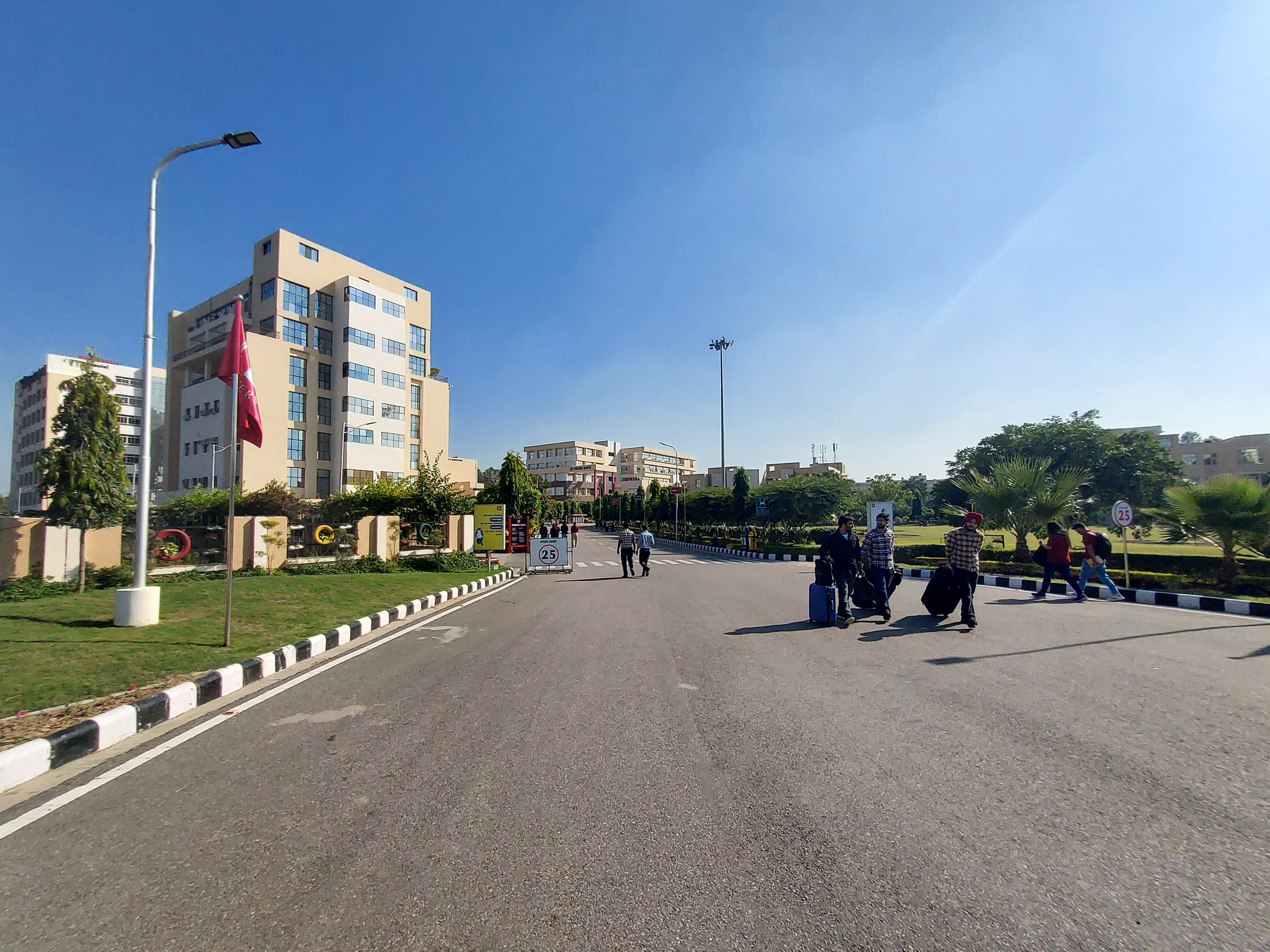
Main inside road, Chitkara University Punjab campus

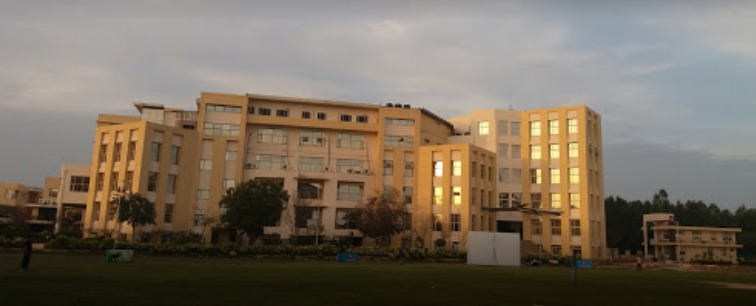
Chitkara Business School

The university includes:

- Chitkara Business School
- Chitkara College of Sales & Marketing
- Chitkara University Institute of Engineering & Technology
- Chitkara University School of Maritime Studies
- Chitkara College of Applied Engineering
- Chitkara School of Planning and Architecture
- Chitkara Design School
- Chitkara School of Mass Communication
- Chitkara College of Hospitality Management (Hospitality and Culinary programs)
- Chitkara College of Pharmacy (B Pharm, M Pharm, Pharm D)
- Chitkara School of Health Sciences (Nursing, Physiotherapy, Optometry etc.)
- Chitkara Law School (B.A., L.L.B.)
- Chitkara College of Education
- Centre for Global Education
- Chitkara University Online

== Student life ==
Chitkara University hosts chapters of the Association Internationale des Étudiants en Sciences Économiques et Commerciales (AIESEC), Institute of Electrical Engineers (IEEE), Association for Computing Machinery (ACM), Institution of Electronics and Telecommunication Engineers (IETE), Institution of Engineers (India) (IEI), Society of Automotive Engineers India (SAE India) and Computer Society of India (CSI).

== See also ==
- Chitkara University, Himachal Pradesh
