= University Institute of Information Technology, Himachal Pradesh University =

University Institute of Technology (UIT) Shimla
- Motto: योगः कर्मसु कौशलं (Yoga is skill in action)
- Established: 2000; 26 years ago
- Affiliations: Himachal Pradesh University
- Director: A. J. Singh
- Location: Shimla, Himachal Pradesh, India; 31.1117°N 77.1401°E
- Campus: Urban
- Acronym: UIT
- Website: hpuniv.ac.in/university-detail/home.php?uiit

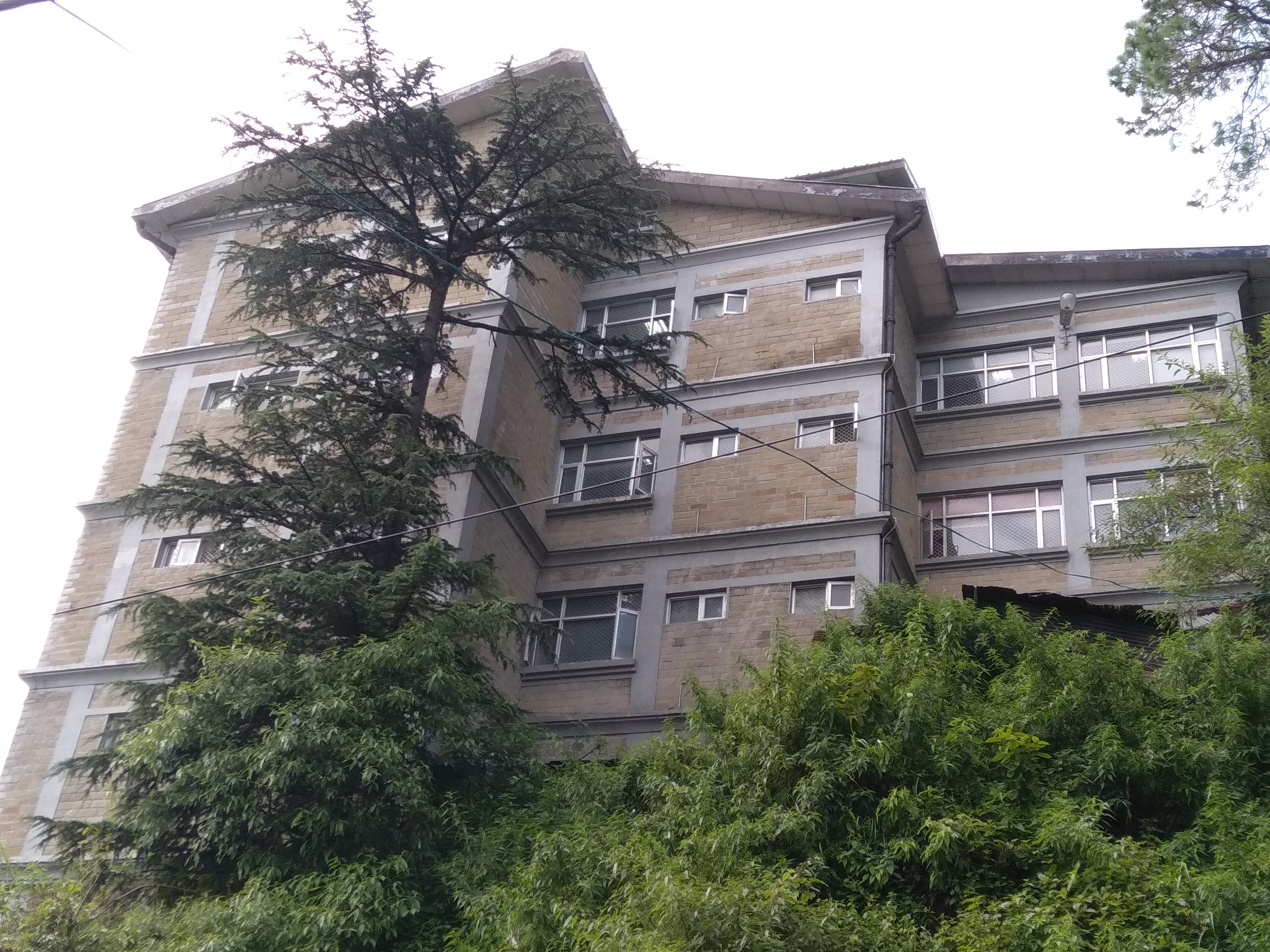
University Institute of Information Technology, HPU

University Institute of Technology (UIT), Himachal Pradesh, was originally founded as the University Institute of Information Technology (UIIT) on 11 September 2000.

Located within the Himachal Pradesh University campus at Summerhill, Shimla, India, UIT also offers degrees in Computer Science Engineering (CSE), Electronics and Communication Engineering (ECE), Electrical Engineering (EE), and Civil Engineering (CE).

== Departments ==
- Department of Civil Engineering
- Department of Computer Science Engineering
- Department of Information Technology
- Department of Electrical Engineering
- Department of Electronics and Communications Engineering

== Change of name ==
On 28 February 2020, the name of University Institute of Information Technology (UIIT) changed to University Institute of Technology (UIT) due to addition of other engineering branches.

== See also ==
- Himachal Pradesh University
