= National Institute of Technology, Hamirpur =

Institute in Hamirpur, Himachal Pradesh, India

Coordinates: 31.7070°N 76.5263°E

- Other name: NITH
- Former names: Regional Engineering College, Hamirpur
- Motto: उद्यमेन हि सिद्धयान्ति कार्याणि न मनोरथैः॥ (Sanskrit)
- Motto in English: No substitute for hard work
- Type: Public technical university
- Established: 1986; 40 years ago (as REC Hamirpur); 2002; 24 years ago (as NIT Hamirpur)
- Affiliations: Ministry of Education (Government of India)
- Chairperson: Sanjay Gupta
- Director: Hiralal Murlidhar Suryawanshi
- Academic staff: 120
- Administrative staff: 150
- Students: 2,500+
- Postgraduates: 1,000+
- Location: Hamirpur, Himachal Pradesh, India
- Campus: Urban, 320 acres
- Nickname: NITians
- Website: www.nith.ac.in

National Institute of Technology Hamirpur (NIT Hamirpur or NITH) is a public technical university located in Hamirpur, Himachal Pradesh, India. It was declared to be an Institute of National Importance by the Government of India under the Institutes of Technology Act.

The institute was established in 1984 as a Regional Engineering College. It was upgraded to NIT in 2003 by the parliament of India. NIT Hamirpur offers a comprehensive curriculum for undergraduate, graduate and doctorate studies in various fields of architecture, engineering, pure sciences and humanities.

== History ==
=== Foundation ===
The institute came into existence on 7 August 1986 as Regional Engineering College, Hamirpur in Hamirpur, Himachal Pradesh, India. It was a joint enterprise of the Government of India and the Government of Himachal Pradesh. The classes commenced at Government Polytechnic College, Hamirpur as REC Hamirpur did not initially have a campus. The classes and administration moved to their current location in 1987. At its inception, the institute only had three departments, Civil Engineering, Electrical and Electronics Engineering and Mechanical Engineering. Later, two more departments, Electronics and Communication Engineering (1988) and Computer Science and Engineering (1989) were added. The department of Architecture was established in 2000. Recently in 2013, the Chemical Engineering department came into existence. The institute offered undergraduate courses until 2005. Thereafter, graduate and Ph.D programs became available.

On 26 June 2002, REC Hamirpur was awarded the status of deemed university and upgraded into a National Institute of Technology. As a result of this transition the institute came under the sole purview of the Government of India. It was awarded the status of Institute of National Importance by an Act of Parliament along with other NITs and IITs. NIT Hamirpur has been ranked as best NIT in terms of infrastructure by the World Bank in 2007.

== Campus ==
The institute campus is situated in the Hamirpur district of Himachal Pradesh, India, at an altitude of 900 meters above sea level. The campus is spread across 320 acres and is located on a hilly terrain which is surrounded by pine trees. The distance to campus from main bus terminus of Hamirpur city is approximately 4 kilometers. The nearest situated airport is Kangra Airport at 86.9 kilometers. Bus and cab facilities are easily available for the campus.

Being a residential campus, there are eight boys' hostels and five girls' hostels, with residences for the faculty and staff. Some hostels have four-seated or triple-seated rooms, while others have doublets and singlets. Mega Hostel is the newest and largest in its capacity.

=== Hostels ===
Boys' Hostels

- Kailash Boys' Hostel
- Shivalik Boys' Hostel
- Dhauladhar Boys' Hostel
- Vindhyachal Boys' Hostel
- Neelkanth Boys' Hostel
- Himadri Hostel
- Himgiri Hostel
- Udaygiri Hostel

Girls' Hostels

- Parvati Girls' Hostel
- Ambika Girls' Hostel
- Aravali Hostel
- Manimahesh Girls' Hostel
- Satpura Hostel

=== Computer Centre ===
Computer Centre is a central facility, which caters to the needs of academic departments. The aim of the centre is to provide professional services, promote and assist the use of new computing technology among the students, staff and administration. The website of NITH is also maintained by the computer center.

=== Central Library ===
The institute library was set up in 1986 in one room of Government Polytechnic Hamirpur and was shifted to the institute campus in 1988 in Visvesvarya Block. At present it is in a separate building with the floor area of 3200 square meters. The library has more than 100,000 books and numerous scientific journals in both print and electronic format. The reading halls of the library can accommodate around 600 people at a time. The building is facilitated with water coolers, heaters, Wi-Fi and other amenities. The library uses OPAC to issue books.

=== Sports ===
NIT Hamirpur provides sports facilities for indoor and outdoor games. Teams are sent out to compete in university-level sports competition. Sports facilities include karate, cricket, football, lawn tennis, basketball, volleyball, table tennis, badminton, kabaddi and athletics. Annual sports events such as Lalkar is also celebrated with several events such as relay, shot put and 100m race. Inter branch and inter year sports matches such as football and cricket are also held round the year.

=== Health Centre ===
NIT Hacentre. It is equipped with basic medical facilities and in case of emergency, patients are referred to the Zonal Hospital, Hamirpur.

== Organization and administration ==
=== Departments ===
NIT Hamirpur has 13 departments and a center of excellence. The academic departments at NIT Hamirpur include:

- Computer Science and Engineering
- Civil Engineering
- Chemical Engineering
- Electronics and Communication Engineering
- Electrical Engineering
- Mechanical Engineering
- Material Sciences & Engineering
- Chemistry
- Mathematics & Scientific Computing
- Physics & Photonic Science
- Architecture
- Humanities & Social Sciences
- Management Studies

=== Center ===
The a center of excellence located at NIT Hamirpur is the Centre for Energy Studies.

== Academics ==
=== Ranking ===
College rankings

Engineering – India
- NIRF (2022): 128
- NIRF (2024): 101-150

Architecture – India
- NIRF (2022): 26
- NIRF (2023): 28
- NIRF (2024): 32

National Institute of Technology, Hamirpur was ranked 97th among engineering colleges by the National Institutional Ranking Framework (NIRF) in 2025.

Department of Architecture, NIT, Hamirpur was ranked 30th among all architecture colleges by the NIRF in 2025.

== Student life ==
=== Hill'ffair ===
Students performing at Open Air Theater during Hill'ffair 2005

Hill'ffair is a cultural event of the institute, organized at the national level, with the involvement of bands, singers, musicians, artist, poets and participants from all across the country. The event consists of two days and three nights of performance covering a wide genre of dance, music and drama. Cultural activities and various student clubs are a few options that act as a catalyst in developing technical, managerial and conceptual skills amongst students. NIT Hamirpur provides a number of such platforms in the forms of clubs to its students to select a club as per their likes and channelize their energies in translating their ideas into reality.

=== NIMBUS ===
NIMBUS is the annual technical festival of National Institute of Technology, Hamirpur, Himachal Pradesh, India. It is touted to be an amalgamation of ideas, expressions, innovations, prototypes and knowledge channels, taken to the most premier levels. In NIMBUS all the departmental teams compete with their best projects, demonstrations and events. Students from Himachal and outside Himachal Pradesh come to participate in these events. There are two types of teams, core and departmental teams. The departmental teams are:

- ABRAXAS (Eng. Physics)
- OJAS (Electrical Eng.)
- MEDEXTROUS (Mechanical Eng.)
- VIBHAV (Electronics & Comm)
- C HELIX (Civil Eng.)
- Hermetica (Chemical Eng.)
- Team .EXE (Computer Science and Engineering)
- Design O Crats (Architecture)
- Metamorph (Material science Eng.)
- Matcom(MNC Department)

and the core teams are:

- Team Finance and Treasury
- Resurgence
- Pixonoids
- Public Relations
- Music Club
- Rhythmeecz
- Discipline Club
- Organization Club
- Fine Art Club
- Team Technical

Lalkaar

National Institute of Technology Hamirpur is one of the premier technical institutes in Northern India. The Institute presently provides sports facilities for both outdoor and indoor activity. A standard size stadium with provision of pavilion has been provided to the student where the games like Cricket, Football, Basketball, Volleyball, Kabaddi, Lawn Tennis, Martial Arts, Karate and Athletics are played. The Student's Activity Center(SAC) was recently built with world class facilities to host various extra-curricular activities by the students.

== Notable alumni ==
- Prof. Dr.-Ing. Habil. Mohit Kumar, Professor for "Computational Intelligence in Automation (apl)" at the University of Rostock, Germany, Key Researcher Data Science and Research Team Lead AI Regulations and Security at Software Competence Center Hagenberg, Austria.
- Vijay Kumar Thakur, scientist in Manufacturing Enhanced Composites & Structures Centre at Cranfield University.
- Mr. Nitesh Gupta, Director Engineering at Intel Corporation.
- Kumar Vijay Mishra, ARL Senior Fellow, US Army Research Laboratory.
- Mr. Samneet Thakur, Data Scientist, ISRO

== Notable visitors ==
- Dalai Lama

== See also ==
- Dr. B. R. Ambedkar National Institute of Technology Jalandhar
- National Institute of Technology, Kurukshetra
- National Institute of Technology, Jamshedpur
- National Institute of Technology, Warangal
