= Maharaja Agrasen University =

Indian private university

- Motto in English: "Spark The Change"
- Type: University
- Established: 2013
- Affiliations: UGC, NAAC, PCI, BCI, AICTE
- Chancellor: Nand Kishore Garg
- Vice-Chancellor: Pardeep Singh Walia
- Location: Solan, Himachal Pradesh, India; 30°52′39″N 76°52′36″E
- Website: www.mau.ac.in

Maharaja Agrasen University is a private university located at the HIMUDA Education Hub, near the village Kallujhanda, District Solan, Himachal Pradesh, India. It was founded by Nand Kishore Garg in the town of Barotiwala in 2013. The Pro-chancellor of the University is Rakesh Kumar Gupta. The university established under Maharaja Agrasen (Establishment and Regulation) Act, 2012 (Act. No. 15 of 2013).

== Academics ==
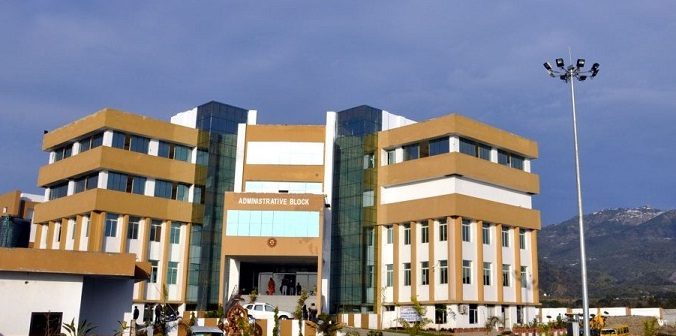
Administration building

Maharaja Agrasen University offers ten arts, commerce, law and sciences programs, four engineering programs, two management programs and one architecture program. These are divided into seven schools:

- Institute of Technology
- School of Management
- School of Law
- School of Pharmacy
- School of Basic and Applied Science

Like all universities in India, Maharaja Agrasen University is recognised by the University Grants Commission (India) (UGC), which has also sent an expert committee and accepted compliance of observations and deficiencies.

Maharaja Agrasen University organised a two-day National Seminar on Corporate Social Responsibility for Sustainable and Inclusive Growth on campus. The Seminar was organised in collaboration with Himachal Pradesh Commerce and Management Association. In 2014, the university signed a memorandum of understanding with Ghana Technology University College in Accra.

== Campus life ==
The campus spans 16 acres (0.065 km^{2}) and has a hilly environment. Student hostels are available on campus, with housing available for 450 students.

== Notable alumni ==
- Angad Singh, Punjab MLA
