= Chitkara University, Himachal Pradesh =

Private university in Solan, India

- Type: Private
- Established: 2009
- Founders: Ashok K. Chitkara, Madhu Chitkara
- Affiliations: UGC, NAAC, AIU
- Chancellor: Ashok K. Chitkara
- Vice-Chancellor: Rajnish Sharma
- Location: Kallujhanda, Solan, Himachal Pradesh, India; 30.877°N 76.872°E
- Website: www.chitkarauniversity.edu.in

Chitkara University, Himachal Pradesh is a private university located at the HIMUDA Education Hub, near the village Kallujhanda, Solan district, Himachal Pradesh, India. The university was established in 2009 by the Chitkara Educational Trust through the Chitkara University (Establishment and Regulation) Act, 2008. Chitkara Educational Trust, founded by Ashok K. Chitkara and Madhu Chitkara, who serve as the institute's Chancellor and Pro-chancellor respectively, has also set up Chitkara University, Punjab.

== Schools ==
The university includes six schools:

- Chitkara School of Engineering & Technology
- Chitkara School of Hospitality Management
- Chitkara School of Basic Sciences
- Chitkara School of Computer Applications
- Chitkara School of Pharmacy
- Chitkara School of Nursing

== Academics ==
Chitkara University offers 4-Year Bachelor of Engineering (B.E.) programmes in various engineering and technology fields. Candidates with a 3-year diploma in Engineering or an equivalent degree can also join a 3-year lateral entry B.E. programmes. Master of Engineering (ME) programmes are also available. The university also offers doctoral programmes.

=== Approval ===
Like all universities in India, Chitkara University, Himachal Pradesh is recognised by the University Grants Commission (UGC), which has also sent an expert committee. The UGC states that "University to take corrective measures in respect of the suggestions of the UGC inspection committee and approach UGC after two years". The university is accredited by the National Assessment and Accreditation Council (NAAC) with a score of 2.71 out of 4 and a "B" grade. The university is also a member of the Association of Indian Universities (AIU).
