= Alakh Prakash Goyal Shimla University =

Private university in Himachal Pradesh, India

- Other name: APG Shimla University
- Type: Private
- Established: 2012
- Affiliations: UGC, COA, BCI, AIU
- Chancellor: Er. Suman Vikrant
- Vice-Chancellor: Dr. Rajinder Singh Chauhan
- Location: Shimla, Himachal Pradesh, India; 31.06°N 77.16°E
- Website: agu.edu.in

Alakh Prakash Goyal Shimla University (APGSU) is a private university located near Shimla, Himachal Pradesh, India on the Mehli Shoghi bypass road. The university was established in 2012 by the A.P. Goyal Charitable Trust through the APG (Alakh Prakash Goyal) Shimla University Establishment and Regulation Act, 2012.

== Schools ==
The university has the following eight schools:

- School of Advance Computing
- School of Engineering and Technology
- School of Legal Studies and Research
- School of Sciences
- School of Design
- School of Management
- School of Hospitality and Tourism Management
- School of Architecture and Planning
- School of Journalism and Mass Communication
- School of Art and Humanities
- School of Para Medical Sciences

== Approval ==
Like all universities in India, Alakh Prakash Goyal Shimla University is recognised by the University Grants Commission (India) (UGC), which has also sent an expert committee and accepted compliance of observations and deficiencies. The School of Architecture's 5-year Bachelor of Architecture programme is approved by the Council of Architecture (COA). The programmes by the School of Legal Studies and Research are approved by the Bar Council of India (BCI). The university is also a member of the Association of Indian Universities (AIU).
