= Skill University (India) =

University in India

Skill University is a type of Higher-Education degree-awarding Institute in India which offer courses that are skill-based, job-oriented and of applied nature. Such universities offers courses that have higher job potential and employability in the market. The Skills Universities award degrees that will conform to the National Skills Qualification Framework.

Seacom Skills University (SSU) is India's first skill university established in the state of West Bengal in 2014.

The idea of Skills Universities in India was first proposed in the National Skills Universities Bill, 2015 by the Ministry of Skill Development and Entrepreneurship, Government of India. The proposal stated that skills universities will offer courses like B.Voc (Bachelor of Vocation), B.Skills (Bachelor of Skills), M.Voc (Master of Vocation), M.Skills (Masters of Skills) among others.

== Public Skill Universities ==
- Shri Vishwakarma Skill University (SVSU), Haryana (formally Haryana Vishwakarma Skill University, Haryana)
- Ratan Tata University (formerly Maharashtra State Skills University), Maharashtra
- Assam Skill University (ASU), Assam
- Delhi Skill and Entrepreneurship University (DSEU), Delhi
- Kaushalya - the Skill University, Gujarat
- Scope Global Skills University, Bhopal
- Bhartiya Skill Development University (BSDU), Rajasthan
- Lamrin Tech Skill University, Punjab
- Seacom Skills University, West Bengal
- Medhavi Skills University (MSU), Sikkim
- Sikkim Skill University, Sikkim
- Symbiosis Skills and Professional University, Maharashtra
- TeamLease Skills University, Gujarat
- Centurion University of Technology and Management, Odisha
- Centurion University of Technology and Management, Andhra Pradesh

== See also ==
- List of Universities in India
- National Skill Development Corporation
