= Akram Vignan Movement =

Religious movement originating in India in the 1960s

- Formation: 1960s (65 years ago)
- Founder: Dada Bhagwan
- Type: New spiritual movement
- Leaders: Deepakbhai Desai, Kanubhai Patel
- Main organ: Dadavani, Akram Vignan

The Akram Vignan movement, also spelled Akram Vijnan, is a new religious movement originated in 1960s in Gujarat, India. It was founded by Dada Bhagwan and later spread to Maharashtra and Gujarati diaspora communities around the world. After death of Dada Bhagwan, the movement split in two factions: one led by Niruben Amin and the other led by Kanubhai Patel.

The principal doctrine of the Akram Vignan movement is gnan bhakti which means devotional surrender (samarpan) to Simandhar Swami and his interlocutor Dada Bhagwan to gain knowledge of salvation.

== Fundamentals ==
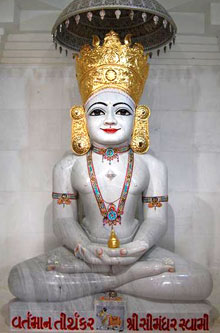
Statue of Simandhar Swami at Trimandir, the temple at Adalaj

The Akram Vignan movement draws some principles from Jainism and teaches about two paths. Jains believe that liberation (Kevala jnana and moksha) is not possible in current times as no suitable condition for liberated being exists which is based on Jain cosmological assumption. This is believed in dominant Kramik or step-by-step path of Jainism. By contrast, Akramik or stepless path believes that the moksha can be achieved directly by grace (kripa) of Simandhar Swami, the present Jain Tirthankara who lives in mythical land of Mahavideha in Jain cosmology. The Akram Vignan movement claims to offer 'instant salvation' by a medium (nimitta) or interlocutor who directly connects to Simandhar Swami through magical means. The principal medium was A. M. Patel who was known as Dada Bhagwan who founded the movement.

The principal doctrine of the Akram Vignan movement is jnan bhakti which means devotional surrender (samarpan) to Simandhar Swami and his interlocutor Dada Bhagwan to gain knowledge of salvation.

In contrast to traditional Jainism, it rejects or is indifferent to scriptural knowledge, physical asceticism, rituals and practices in favour of self-knowledge (atma-jnan) through direct grace of Simandhar Swami and devotion to his medium (gurubhakti).

The followers are required to consume a lacto-vegetarian diet.

Flügel regards the movement to be a form of Jain-Vaishnava syncretism, a development analogous to the Mahayana in Buddhism.

== History ==
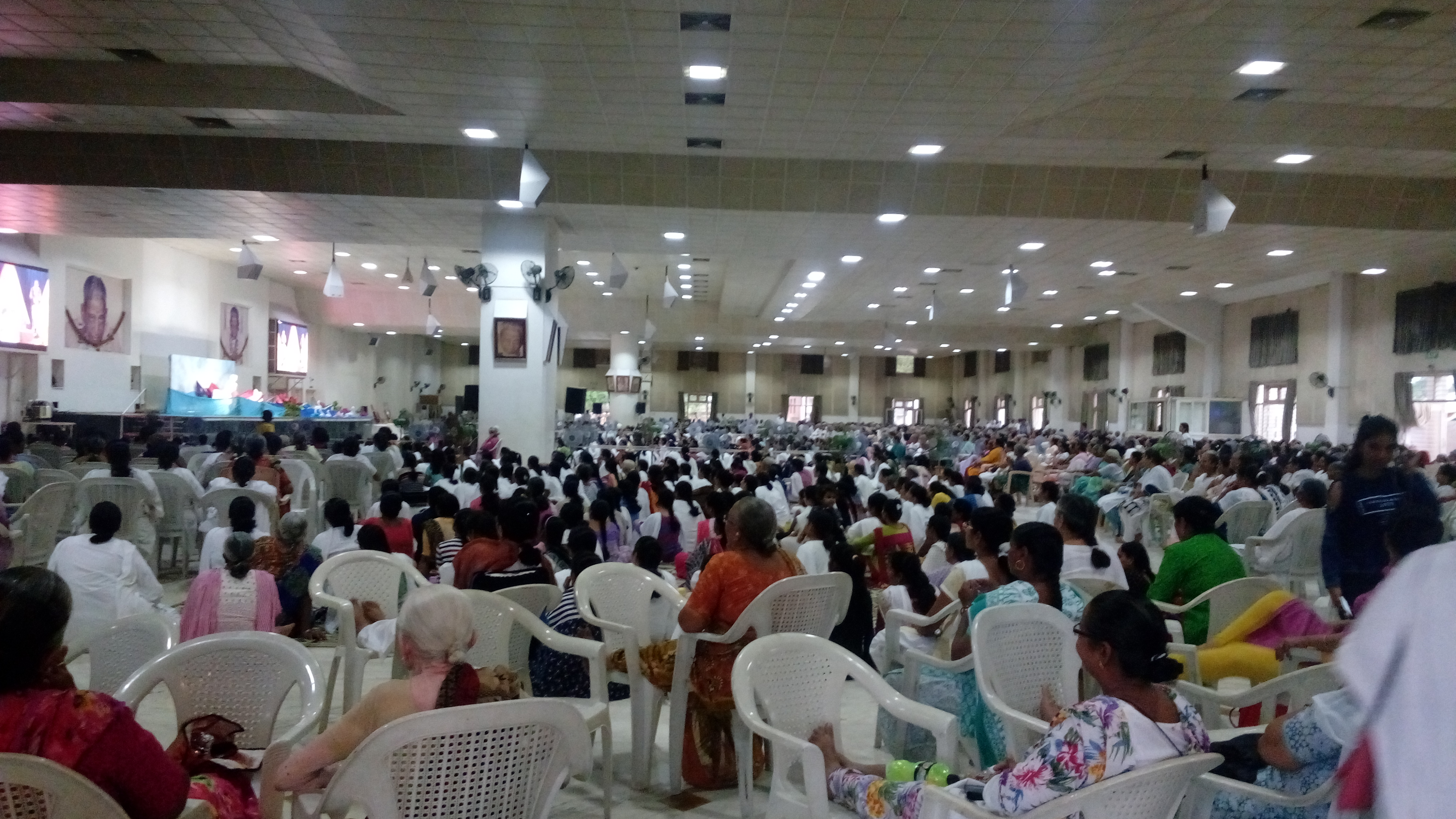
Followers of Akram Vignan Movement gathered on occasion of Guru Purnima at Trimandir temple, Adalaj near Ahmedabad, Gujarat, India. July 2017.

=== Early years ===
The movement was founded by Ambalal Muljibhai Patel who had achieved self-realization in June 1958 as described in his discourses or conversations. He is known as Atmagnani or Dada Bhagwan by his followers though he had differentiated between self and his empirical self as Patel and Dada Bhagwan. Initially he had not revealed his experiences to public but some of his close relatives and friends knew it. In 1962, during conversation with him, a person named Chandrakant Patel from Uganda experienced sudden self-realization. Such experience is described in traditional Jainism as kshayaka samyatva which is only achieved in presence of Tirthankara. Kanubhai K. Patel was the second person, who was also his business partner, who received instant knowledge in 1963 from Dada Bhagwan.

=== Expansion ===
Between 1962 and 1968, very few close people received "knowledge" through Dada Bhagwan. Following 1968, he bestowed "knowledge" who requested to be blessed. This is the foundation of the movement. He said that he was initially reluctant due to fear of public opinion as in case of Shrimad Rajchandra but after his visit to a Rishabha temple in Khambhat he decided to public performance of Gyanvidhi, a practise to transfer of "knowledge" for self-realisation. In 1968, the first Gyanvidhi was held at Bombay (now Mumbai). Over the years, the Gyanvidhi became more elaborate and achieved its present form in 1983. He continued to give religious discourses. He emphasised contact of "knower" (jnani) to gain knowledge over scriptural or ritual knowledge. His followers were initially spread in his hometown Vadodara and Bombay. The movement expanded in 1960s and 1970s to southern Gujarat and Maharashtra and in Gujarati diaspora in East Africa, North America and UK. In 1983, he had reportedly around 50,000 followers. When he died in 1988, his funeral was attended by about 60000. In 1999, their magazine Akram Vignan claimed to have 3,00,000 followers.

Jay Sachchidanand Sangh, the major organisation of Akram Vignan movement, was founded under the auspices of Dada Bhagwan in Mumbai. Khetsi Narsi Shah, a head of local Dada Bhagwan Vitarag Trust, was appointed as the first sanghpati, the community leader of it. He was succeeded by G. A. Shah of Ahmedabad. The organisation manages activities and movements of religious leader and his chief followers called Aptaputras and Aptaputris (celibate disciples who are invited around the world). It also manages community funds and supervises building activities along with publication of books and magazine, Akram Vignan (first published in 1979). Now the organisation is led by local sanghpatis in Ahmedabad, Surat, Mumbai, London and US.

=== Successions ===
Niruben Amin, a gynecologist was one of the followers of Dada Bhagwan. When Dada Bhagwan suffered from fractured leg and required constant medical attention, she joined him to serve him with her medical knowledge and continued to tour with him including his foreign visits from 1982 to 1987. During the same period, Kanubhai had continued to operate a company in which Dada Bhagwan was partner before he attained self realization.

Soon after death of Dada Bhagwan, the movement split in two factions. One led by Kanubhai Patel and backed by Jay Sachchidannad Sangh and other led by Niruben Amin. Niruben claimed that she was instructed and trained in Gyanvidhi by Dada Bhagwan. Niruben formed her own organisations; first Dada Bhagwan Foundation Trust of Ajit Patel in Chennai and Ahmedabad, and later Simandhar Swami Aradhana Trust in Ahmedabad and Mahavideh Foundation in Mumbai. She became popular leader of movement and was addressed as Niruma by her followers from 1999. After death of Niruben Amin in 2006, she was succeeded by Deepakbhai Desai.

Kanubhai Patel, also known as Kanudada, was close to Dada Bhagwan before 1978. He claims succession and presents a recorded tape in which Dada Bhagwan had instructed about it (succession). He is seen as future Tirthankara by his many followers. His faction refers their teaching of Akram Vignan as Vitrag Vignan. He was accused of duping his followers of money. The police case was filed against him and his family members. He was removed as the leader of Jay Sachchidanand Sangh following the case. He moved to US where he died on 9 June 2020. His son Bhavesh Patel declared himself the successor.

== Doctrines ==
Niruben Amin organised the movement by publishing the discourses of Dada Bhagwan, formalising Gyanvidhi, construction of temples and composing ritual worship (puja).

Niruben Amin had tape-recorded the discourses of Dada Bhagwan between 1974 and 1988 which amount to about 4000 tapes. These tapes are transcribed, compiled and published as Aptavani (Words of Truth). The fourteen volumes are published. The first one and half volume was compiled by Niruben Amin and Kanubhai Patel together. The first volume was published by Jay Sachchidanand Sangh in 1974. After 1983, almost all of volumes are based on tapes recorded by Amin. Other texts of Dada Bhagwan include Swarup Vignan, the collection of satsang notes by Natubhai Patel 'Vasudev', published in 1980s.

These printed compilations are not used in any rituals as Dada Bhagwan refused to write religious texts. He only wrote two short ritual texts, Namaskar Vidhi (1971–73) and Nav Kalamo (1977). Namskar Vidhi is a devotional hymn which includes all beings worthy of worship; Panch Parmeshthi of Jain Namokar Mantra to Krishna to Dada Bhagwan himself in descending order. Nav Kalamo (Nine Precepts) is a prayer to Dada Bhagwan which is considered as 'the essence of all scriptures'. Tri-mantra (Three-fold mantra) is modified version of Jain Namokar Mantra which also includes respect to Jina, Krishna and Shiva which is used at the opening of every religious event. Nishchay-Vyavahar Charan Vidhi (Intentful-Behaviour Basic Process) written by Vanubhai Patel in 1968 at the request of Dada Bhagwan and Amin is an important text used in daily worship as well as in Gyanvidhi. The opening chants of Gyanvidhi currently used were composed by Navneet Patel, a songwriter from Mumbai, in 1970. Niruben Amin has also composed an aarti dedicated to Simandhar Swami.

Jay Sachchidanand Sangh, led by Kanubhai, published several books including volumes of Aptasutra and Aptavani (Vol. 1 to 9), Anubhav Gnan Sutras, Panch Agna Paramarth, poetry of Navneet Sanghvi.

== Temples ==
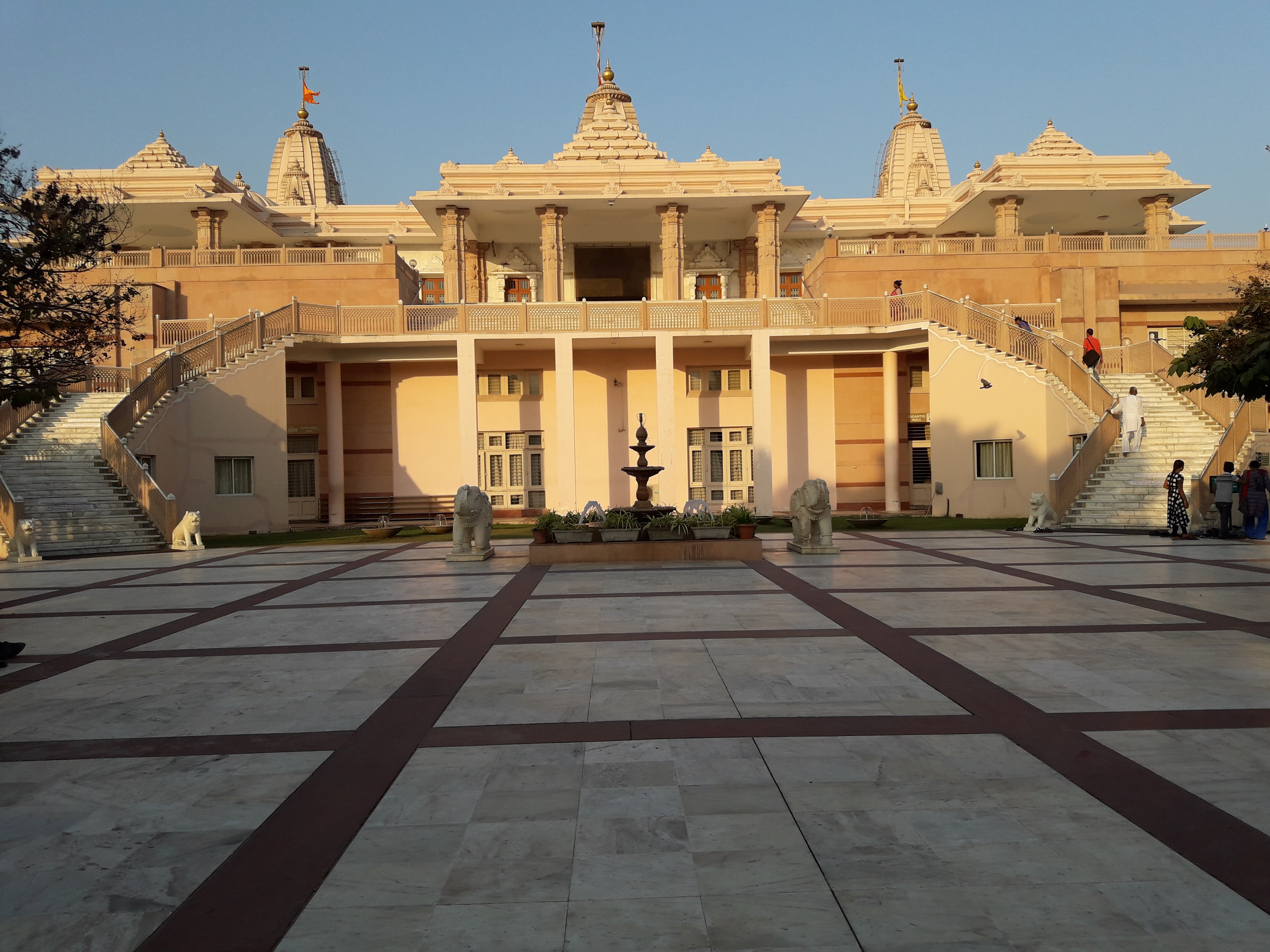
Trimandir at Adalaj, Gujarat

After initial reluctance, Dada Bhagwan agreed to build a temple, Trimandir, which included images of Simandhar Swami, Krishna and Shiva to present message of universal religion. In 1993, a temple and dharmashala (rest house) was constructed in Surat managed by the Mahavideh Tirthdham Trust. It had all three images and has a chamber underneath a temples which had photos of A. M. Patel (Dada Bhagwan) and Kanubhai Patel. It is managed by the Jay Sachchidanand Sangh.

Mahavideh Tirthdham, a Trimandir was also built by Niruben Amin in Ahmedabad in 1999. More than 20 Trimandirs were built later by the Dada Bhagwan Foundation.
