= Vasna (Borsad) =

Vasna Borsad INA
- village
- Location in Gujarat, India
- Coordinates: 22.33205°N 72.67033°E
- Country: India
- State: Gujarat
- District: Anand

Population (2013)
  - Total: 9,000

Languages
  - Official: Gujarati, Hindi
- Time zone: UTC+5:30 (IST)

Vasna (Borsad INA) is a town and an Industrial Notified Area of the Borsad municipality in Anand district in the Western Indian state of Gujarat.

== History ==
Vasna village is situated in anand taluka of Gujarat.

== Population ==
As of 2009 India census, Vasna Borsad INA had a population of 9000. Males constitute 53% of the population and females 47%. Vasna Borsad INA has an average literacy rate of 57%, lower than the national average of 59.5%: male literacy is 63%, and female literacy is 49%. In Vasna Borsad INA, 17% of the population is under 6 years of age.

The population mainly survives on farming and agriculture, but in the last ten years many families have migrated from this village to cities and overseas. Vasna has the most NRI families out of the Chovis Gam Patidar Samaj.

Darmaj is a short distance away and Borsad is nearby, too.

Vasna has recently had proper sewage system put in place as well as having the most reliable mains power supply for a village. Other Chovis Gam territories don't have solid paving, even to this date, but Vasna, due to its overseas NRI population amounts, have had funding in place to provide this facility throughout the main parts of the village.

== Places of interest ==
In the centre of the village there is a big house around three stories high, with a great Krishna Statue atop it, and this house can be seen from any rooftop in Vasna. This house was constructed in the late 1960s or early 1970s. There are also many temples which are popular attractions.

Trimandir: This temple has been built based on the non-sectarian concept developed by Param Pujya Dada Bhagwan to demonstrate that the essence of all religions is the same, to achieve self-realisation. The temple has idols of Lord Simandhar Swami, Lord Krishna (Vaishnavism), Lord Shiva (Shaivism) and other Gods and Goddesses, including the Tirthankars of Jainism.

== Economy ==
The pupils co-operative bank supports villagers studying abroad. And another bank is Bank of India.
