= Niruben Amin =

Indian spiritual leader (1944–2006)

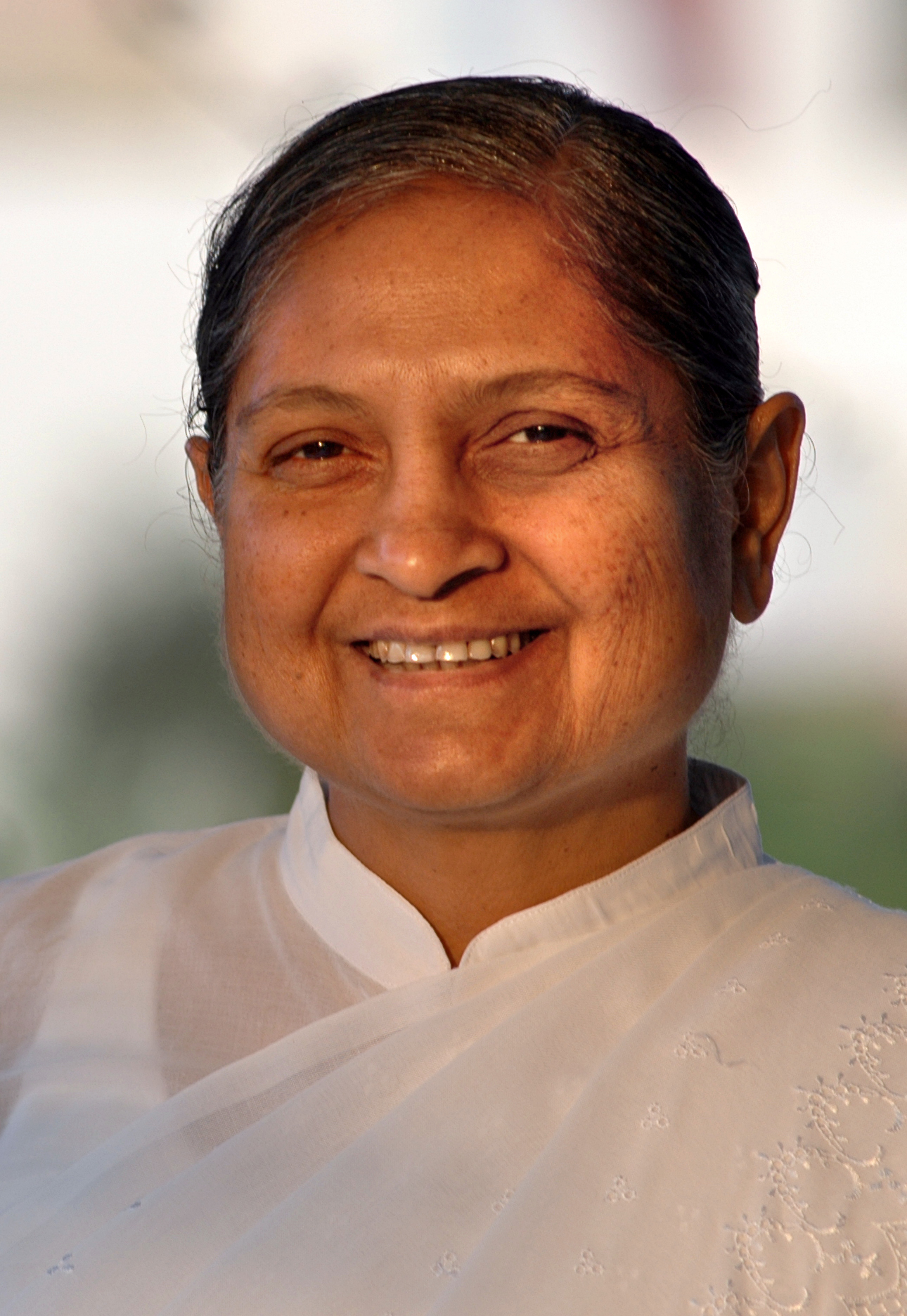

Personal life
- Born: 2 December 1944 Aurangabad, Maharashtra, India
- Died: 19 March 2006 (aged 61)
- Other name: Pujya Niruma

Religious life
- Philosophy: Akram Vignan

Senior posting
- Teacher: Dada Bhagwan
- Predecessor: Dada Bhagwan
- Successor: Deepakbhai Desai

Niruben Amin (2 December 1944 – 19 March 2006), addressed as Pujya Niruma by her followers, was an Indian spiritual leader and an exponent of the Akram Vignan philosophy. A gynecologist by profession, she became a disciple of Dada Bhagwan during her study years. She nursed Dada Bhagwan during his illness and later succeeded him when he died. She headed the Dada Bhagwan Foundation.

== Early life ==
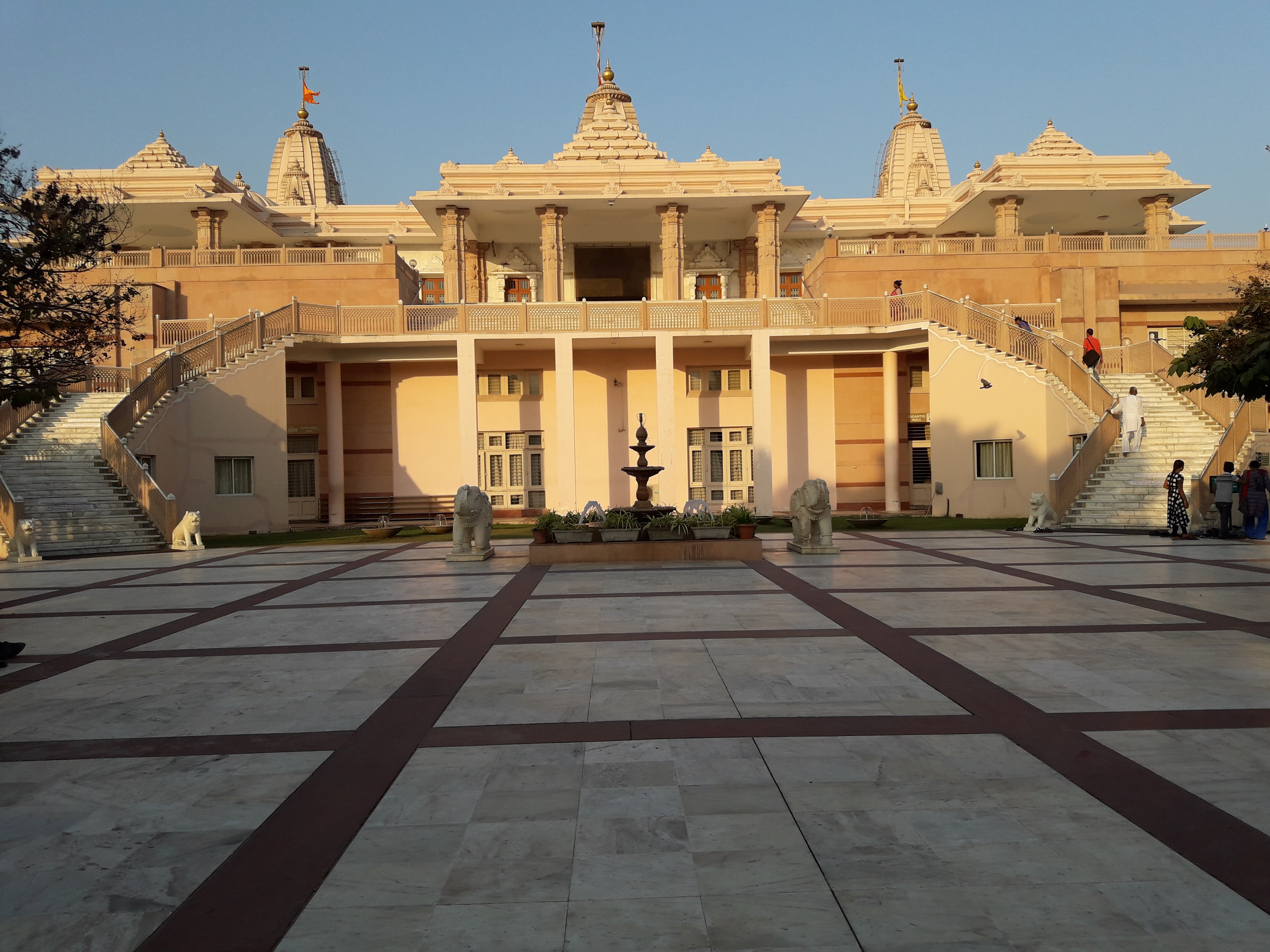
Trimandir at Adalaj

Niruben Amin was born on 2 December 1944 in Aurangabad, Maharashtra, India (then Bombay Presidency) in a wealthy Amin family who was a traditionally Vaishnava Charotar Patel. Her father was a follower of Dada Bhagwan. She was the youngest among five siblings. She completed her school education in Mumbai. She started studying medicine from the Aurangabad Medical College. Following death of her mother, she was introduced to Dada Bhagwan. She graduated from the medical college "with help of Dada Bhagwan" and the same day her father died. She later claimed that Dada Bhagwan had foretold her about the news of the death. She further studied and later practiced as a gynecologist.

== Spiritual career ==
Niruben Amin was said to achieved self-realization on 8 July 1968, by Gnanvidhi of Dada Bhagwan. She started recording tapes of his discourses in 1974 and continued doing so until his death in 1988. More than 4000 such tapes were recorded and were later transcribed and compiled in 14 volumes of Aptavani. In 1976, she was 'blessed' by Dada Bhagwan in 1976 at Mamani Pol, Vadodara when she was serving him during his illness. She continued to practice in minor surgery. In 1978, when Dada Bhagwan suffered from a fractured leg and required constant medical attention, she joined him to serve using her medical knowledge. She traveled with him, including on his foreign visits, from 1982 to 1987.

Soon after the death of Dada Bhagwan in 1988, his Akram Vignan Movement split in two factions. One led by Kanubhai Patel and backed by Jay Sachchidannad Sangh (an organization founded under Dada Bhagwan) and the other led by Niruben Amin. Kanubhai was a business partner before Dada Bhagwan was said to achieved self-realization and was one of his earliest disciples. Niruben claimed that she was instructed and trained in Gnanvidhi by Dada Bhagwan. Niruben formed her own organisations; first Dada Bhagwan Foundation Trust of Ajit Patel in Chennai and Ahmedabad, and later Simandhar Swami Aradhana Trust in Ahmedabad and Mahavideh Foundation in Mumbai. She became a popular leader of the movement and was addressed as Niruma (lit. 'Mother Niru') by her followers from 1999.

Niruben Amin organised the movement by publishing the discourses of Dada Bhagwan, formalising Gnanvidhi, constructing the temples and composing ritual worship (puja). In 2002, she inaugurated the temple complex called the Trimandir in Adalaj, Gandhinagar, which was constructed under her guidance and supervision. The temple has statues of Simandhar Swami, Shiva and Krishna. She also established a commune, Simandhar City, there.

On 19 March 2006, Niruben Amin died following stomach cancer. She was succeeded by Deepakbhai Desai.

Her memorial (Samadhi) was erected at the Trimandir, Adalaj.
