= Deepakbhai Desai =

Indian guru (born 1953)

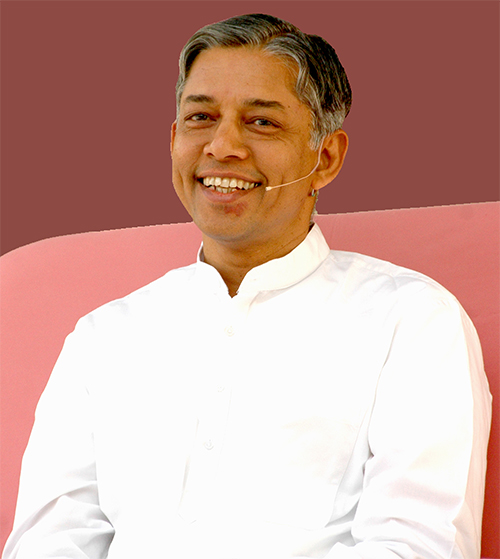
- Born: 9 May 1953 (age 72); Mumbai, Maharashtra, India
- Predecessor: Niruben Amin

Deepakbhai Desai, referred as Pujya Deepakbhai Desai by his followers, is Indian spiritual leader from Gujarat, India. He heads Dada Bhagwan Foundation. He teaches the Akram Vignan philosophy developed by Dada Bhagwan.

== Early life ==
Pujya Deepakbhai Desai was born on 9 May 1953 in Mumbai, Maharashtra, India. His family belonged to Vavania and his paternal ancestral home was next door to that of Shrimad Rajchandra. He is the youngest among five children. He graduated with a degree in the Mechanical Engineering from VJTI in Mumbai in the early 1970s. After graduating from college, he worked in the textile industry as a mechanical engineer for a few years. Later he founded a consulting firm working in the textile industry. Later he retired and joined the Akram Vignan Movement.

== Spiritual career ==
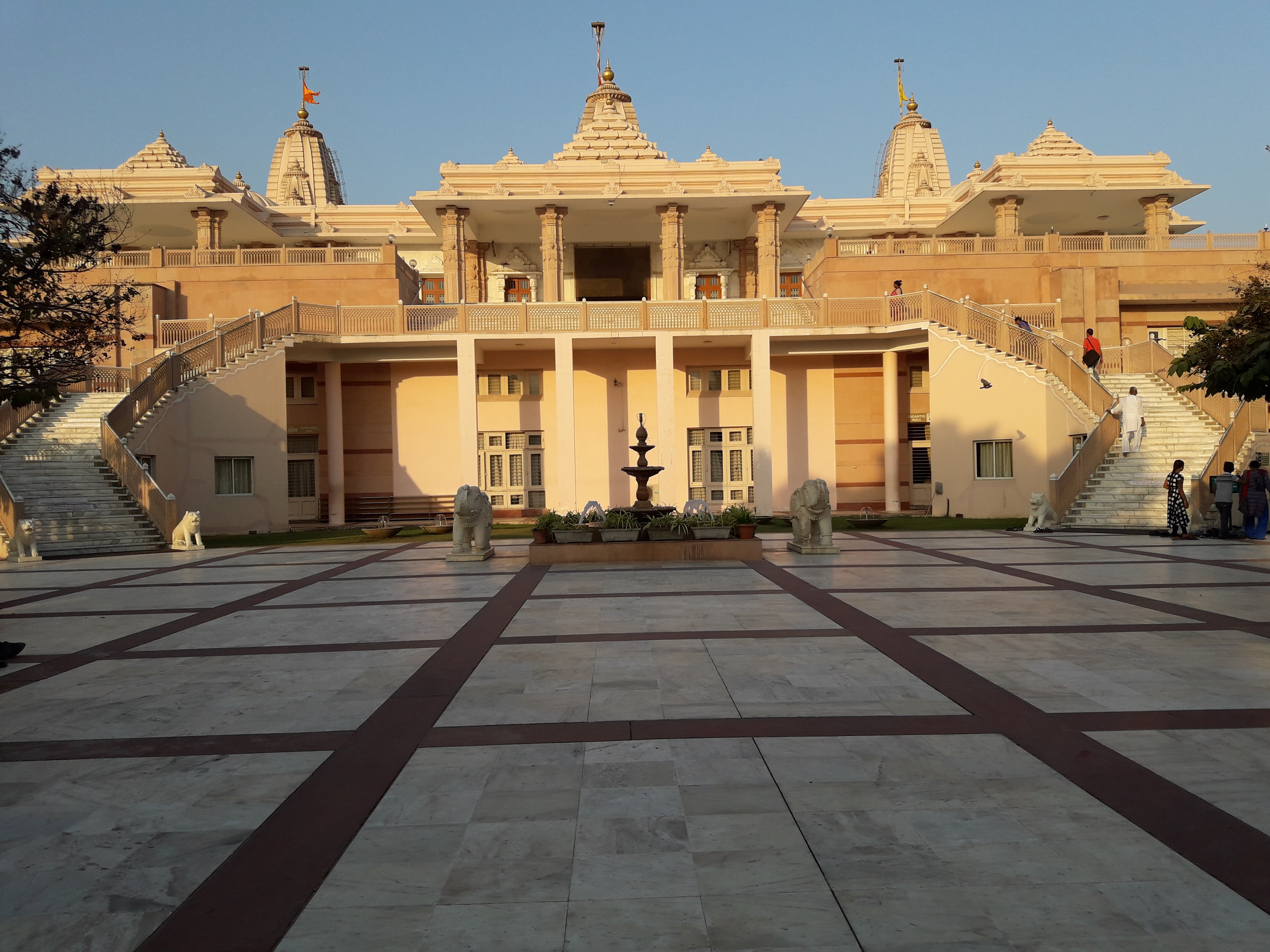
Trimandir at Adalaj

It is said that, Deepakbhai attained self-realization by Gnanvidhi from Dada Bhagwan on 6 March 1971. During the 1980s, Niruben Amin was one of the chief disciples of Dada Bhagwan who recorded tapes of discourses of Dada Bhagwan. He helped Amin transcribe and compile tapes which were later published as volumes of Aptavani.

In 1987, Dada Bhagwan ordained him as Aptaputra who are allowed to conduct spiritual discourses. He traveled in India and abroad to conduct discourses.

After death of Dada Bhagwan in 1988, Niruben Amin founded Dada Bhagwan Foundation. In 2003, she ordained Deepakbhai Desai to conduct Gnanvidhi ceremonies and 'transmit' self-realization (Atma Gnan). After death of Niruben Amin in 2006, she was succeeded by Deepakbhai Desai to head the organisations.

Deepakbhai holds religious discourses including open Q & A sessions in person around the world and on television. Dada Bhagwan Foundation continues to build temples and publish works under his leadership.
