= Dada Bhagwan =

Spiritual leader from Gujarat, India (1908–1988)

- Born: Ambalal Muljibhai Patel (A. M. Patel); 7 November 1908; Tarsali near Baroda (now in Gujarat, India)
- Died: 2 January 1988 (aged 79)

Dada Bhagwan (7 November 1908 – 2 January 1988), also known as Dadashri, born Ambalal Muljibhai Patel, was an Indian spiritual leader from Gujarat who founded the Akram Vignan Movement. He was spiritually inclined from an early age. He worked as a contractor for a company maintaining dry docks in Bombay before attaining "self-realization" in 1958. He withdrew from day-to-day operations of his business and focused on his spiritual goals. The movement around his teaching grew into the Akram Vignan movement gaining followers in western India and abroad. Ahimsa (non-violence) and vegetarianism are an important part of Dada's teachings.

== Biography ==
=== Early life ===
Ambalal Muljibhai Patel (A. M. Patel) was born on 7 November 1908 in Tarsali, a village near Baroda (now in Gujarat, India). His parents, Muljibhai and Jhaverba, were Vaishnava Patidars. He grew up in Bhadran, Kheda district in central Gujarat. A. M. Patel credited his mother for instilling an early appreciation of the values of nonviolence, empathy, selfless generosity, and spiritual penance within him. It is said that he was blessed by a saint when he was thirteen who told him that he would attain liberation. He married a local village girl named Hiraba in 1924. Their children (born in 1928 and 1931) died a few months after birth so they had no surviving children. During this period, he was also influenced by the writings of Shrimad Rajchandra, a Jain philosopher who was also the spiritual guru of Mahatma Gandhi, and householder and religious teacher whose teaching inspired a new religious movement later. He began practising temporary celibacy and later vowed lifelong celibacy. He was a contractor by profession. He moved to Bombay where he worked successfully as a contractor for Patel & Co. in Mumbai. The company used to maintain and construct dry docks in the Bombay harbour.

=== Dada Bhagwan ===
He claimed to have attained self-realisation in June 1958 at Surat railway station while sitting on a bench at platform number 3. It was about 6 pm and it lasted 48 minutes. This was not initially revealed by him.

After his experience, a close relative began to address him by the spiritual name of Dada (a Gujarati term for "Revered Grandfather") Bhagwan (Lord) became his spiritual name. The experience or self-realization is described as revelation or manifestation of the god within, or pure self, supreme self manifested through body; which he later called Dada Bhagwan. He had differentiated between self and his empirical self as Patel and Dada Bhagwan.

He left his business to his partners to concentrate on his spiritual goals. He continued to live on the dividends of his shares of company. He continued his householder life as his teaching did not require renunciation or asceticism.

=== Akram Vignan movement ===
Dada Bhagwan formed a movement which he termed Akram Vignan Movement. Unlike the step-by-step purification according to Jain principles, Akram Vignan promises instant salvation through the grace of Simandhar Swami, for whom Dada Bhagwan serves as a medium. His followers believe that they will be reborn in two lives in Mahavideha, a mythical land described in Jain cosmology from where they can achieve Moksha (liberation) as they are in connection with Gnani (knower). Flügel regards the movement to be a form of Jain-Vaishnava syncretism, a development analogous to the Mahayana in Buddhism.

Initially, he had not revealed his experiences to the public and it was only known by a small number of close relatives and friends. In 1962, during a conversation with him, a person named Chandrakant Patel from Uganda experienced a "sudden self-realization". Such experience is described in traditional Jainism as kshayaka samyaktva which is only achieved in the presence of Tirthankara. Kanubhai K. Patel was the second person, who was also his business partner, who received the "instant knowledge" in 1963 from Dada Bhagwan.

=== Expansion of movement ===
Between 1962 and 1968, very few close people received the "knowledge" through Dada Bhagwan. Following 1968, he bestowed the "knowledge" to those who requested to be blessed. This is considered as the foundation of the movement. He said that he was initially reluctant due to fear of public opinion as in case of Shrimad Rajchandra but after his visit to a Rishabha temple in Khambhat he decided to conduct the public performance of Gnanvidhi, a practice of transferring the "knowledge" for self-realisation. In 1968, the first Gnanvidhi was held at Bombay. Over the years, the Gnanvidhi became more elaborate and achieved its present form in 1983. He continued to give spiritual discourses all over the world. He emphasized contact of "knower" (Gnani) to gain knowledge over scriptural or ritual knowledge. His followers were initially spread in his hometown Vadodara and Bombay. The movement expanded in the 1960s and 1970s to southern Gujarat and Maharashtra and in Gujarati diaspora in East Africa, North America and UK. In 1983, he had reportedly around 50,000 followers.

When he died on 2 January 1988, his funeral was attended by about 60,000 followers.

=== Vegetarianism ===
As part of advocating Ahimsa (non-violence), a strict lacto-vegetarian diet based on Sattvic principles was important to Bhagwan. He argued for cow protection and against the consumption of meat, eggs and root vegetables on ethical and spiritual grounds. Bhagwan stated that "you should never eat meat or eggs. You should not eat potatoes, onions, and garlic, even when you have no choice. This is because onions and garlic are considered items that instigate violence; they induce anger in a person, and when one gets angry, it hurts the other person. You can eat any other vegetables you wish to eat."

Bhagwan opposed the consumption of eggs but stated that dairy products can be consumed freely as long as the cows are well nourished and their calves are not starved.

== Succession ==
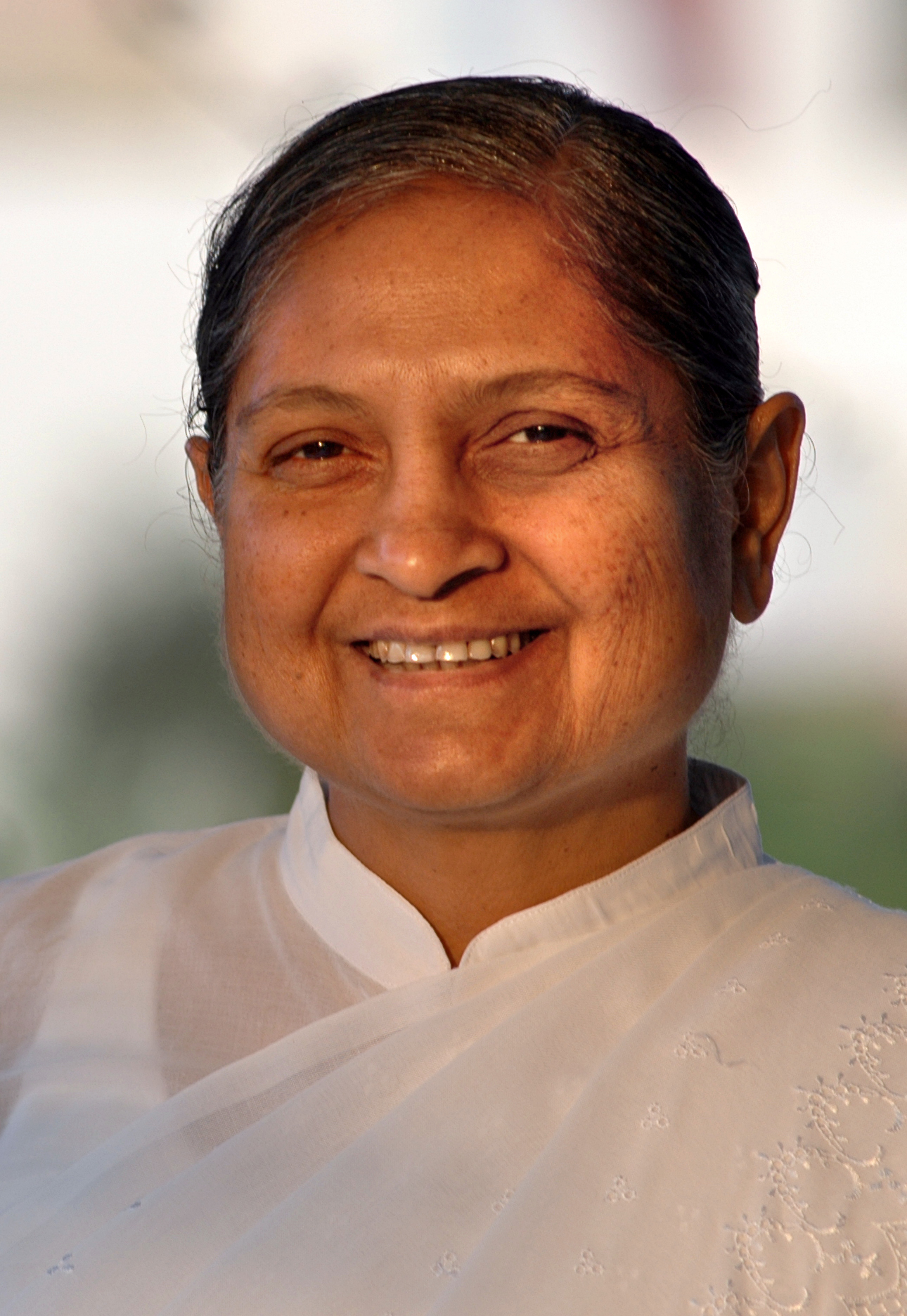
Niruben Amin

Soon after the death of Dada Bhagwan, the movement split into two factions. One led by Kanubhai Patel and backed by Jay Sachchidannad Sangh and other led by Niruben Amin. Niruben stated that she was instructed and trained in Gnanvidhi by Dada Bhagwan. Niruben formed her own organisations; Dada Bhagwan Foundation Trust and Simandhar Swami Aradhana Trust in Ahmedabad and Mahavideh Foundation in Mumbai. She became a popular leader of the movement and was addressed as Niruma by her followers from 1999. After death of Niruben in 2006, she was succeeded by Deepakbhai Desai.

== Recognition ==
In 2012, the Ahmedabad Municipal Corporation named a stretch of road between Visat crossroads and Sabarmati crossroads as Pujya Dada Bhagwan Road and the Zundal circle as Dada Bhagwan circle.

== In Films ==
Dada Bhagwan was portrayed by Gulshan Grover in a 2012 independent film Desperate Endeavors directed by French-Algerian director Salim Khassa.

== Selected publications ==
Dada Bhagwan authored the following books now translated in English:

- Who Am I ?; ISBN 978-81-89725-10-5
- Generation Gap; ISBN 978-81-89725-18-1
- Harmony In Marriage; ISBN 978-81-89725-15-0
- Life Without Conflict; ISBN 978-81-89725-21-1
- Anger; ISBN 978-81-89725-04-4
- Worries; ISBN 978-81-89725-05-1
- The Science Of Karma; ISBN 978-81-89725-11-2
- Life Without Conflict; ISBN 978-81-89725-21-1
