= TeamLease Skills University =

Private university in Gujarat, India

- Type: Private
- Established: 2013
- Chairman: Manish Sabharwal
- Location: Tarsali, Vadodara, Gujarat, India
- Website: http://www.teamleaseuniversity.ac.in/

TeamLease Skills University is a public private university in Tarsali, Vadodara, GujaratTeamLease Skills University (TLSU) is India's first vocational education and training university, established in Gujarat in 2013. It focuses on providing skills-based education aimed at improving employability. The university partners with industries and organizations to offer a combination of classroom learning and hands-on training, including on-the-job training (OJT) programs, internships, and apprenticeships.

TLSU’s programs span across various fields, including technology, business, healthcare, and more, ensuring that students gain practical skills aligned with industry demands. The approach is designed to bridge the gap between academic knowledge and real-world applications, making students job-ready upon graduation. , one of India's largest staffing and recruitment agencies. The university has agreements with the Gujarat government and Labour Ministry of India to provide and promote apprenticeship.
