= Kaushalya Skill University =

Public state skill university in Gujarat, India

Kaushalya The Skill University
- Other name: KSU
- Motto in English: Education with Skill
- Type: Public
- Established: 2021; 5 years ago
- Affiliations: UGC
- President: Manoj Kumar Das, IAS
- Director-General: Lochan Sehra, IAS
- Location: Ahmedabad, Gujarat, India; 23°2′42.32″N 72°32′16.17″E
- Campus: 20 acres (8.1 ha); Multiple sites
- Website: kaushalyaskilluniversity.ac.in

Kaushalya The Skill University (KSU) is a public state skill university located in Ahemdabad, Gujarat. It was set up by the Government of Gujarat.

== History ==
It was established in 2021 via a legislative act of Gujarat Assembly, to impart skills training. It was founded through Gujarat Assembly Act in October 2021, to provide "Education with Skill" with the principles of National Education Policy 2020. It was set up to develop to provide Education with Skill to equip individuals with the expertise needed to become Skill Smart.
