= National Skill Development Corporation =

Indian public-private partnership

- Type: Not-for-profit company
- Founded: 2008; 18 years ago
- Headquarters: New Delhi, India
- Key people: Key People: Arunkumar Pillai: Chief Executive Officer; Rajesh Swaika : Chief Financial Officer; Prashant Sinha : Chief Operating Officer
- Website: www.nsdcindia.org

National Skill Development Corporation (NSDC) is a not-for-profit public limited company incorporated on July 31, 2008, under section 25 of the Companies Act, 1956 (corresponding to section 8 of the Companies Act, 2013). NSDC was set up by Ministry of Finance as Public Private Partnership (PPP) model. The Government of India through Ministry of Skill Development & Entrepreneurship (MSDE) holds 49% of the share capital of NSDC, while the private sector has the balance 51% of the share capital.

NSDC aims to promote skill development by catalyzing creation of large, quality and for-profit vocational institutions. Further, the organization provides funding to build scalable and profitable vocational training initiatives. Its mandate is also to enable support system which focuses on quality assurance, information systems and train the trainer academies either directly or through partnerships. NSDC acts as a catalyst in skill development by providing funding to enterprises, companies and organizations that provide skill training. It also develops appropriate models to enhance, support and coordinate private sector initiatives. The differentiated focus on 21 sectors under NSDC's purview and its understanding of their viability will make every sector attractive to private investment.

== History ==
The NSDC was set up as a Public Private Partnership Company in order to create and fund vocational training institutions, and create support systems for skills development.

In light of the introduction of the Goods and Services Tax in 2017, NSDC and the Institute of Company Secretaries of India (ICSI) collaborated to train over 1,00,000 people as GST experts to help the corporate sector with accounts work. The NSDC has trained more than 5.2 million students, and it has also created 235 private sector partnerships and 38 Sector Skill Councils (SSC) in various industries.

== Projects and collaborations ==
It is estimated that by 2022 India will need an additional 104 million people in the workforce with a further 298 million requiring upgrade in training. To address this NSDC has started skill development initiatives in North East India, with a target of training 240,000 people in 2017–18.

NSDC has also partnered with Amazon's "meri saheli" initiative to improve the digital literacy of women. Together with Google India, it has launched a program to train people on mobile development, via a 100-hour course to be delivered though partner agencies.

NSDC also signed a collaboration with the Indian Institute of Corporate Affairs to train people within CSR, corporate governance, business innovation, e-governance and other skills. Other partners include the Adani Foundation, Uber and Maruti. On 8 July 2020, NSDC and Microsoft announced their partnership which will provide digital learning to over 1 lakh people in 12 months of time. This program will cover a wide range of skills learning; from basic level of digital information to advanced digital skills and technological knowledge.

EFS Facilities Services Group partners National Skill Development Corporation (NSDC) towards the launch of Tejas in 2020.

== Legal structure and Governance ==
NSDC operates under a Public Private Partnership (PPP) model. The Government of India through the Ministry of Skill Development & Entrepreneurship (MSDE) owns 49% of the share capital, while the private sector owns 51%. According to the NSDC's Board Report, the government is the largest shareholder and corporation controller, and the private holders are 10 business associations or confederations – including the Confederation of Indian Industry (CII), Federation of Indian Chambers of Commerce and Industry (FICCI) and National Association of Software & Service Companies (NASSCOM) – each with 5.1% share capital. Under the aegis of MSDE, NSDC has collaborated with central and state governments, industry, non-profit organizations and academia to synergies and accelerate the skilling efforts.

== List of Institutes Partnered ==
- SMEC Automation Pvt Ltd
- A.K SAMANTRAY& CO PVT LTD
- AA EDUTECH PRIVATE LIMITED
- Medhavi Skills University, Sikkim
- Smarts skills Bits & Bytes Pvt Ltd

== Operation and funding model ==
As a not-for-profit company, NSDC realizes its target both by running government-funded activities and providing funding to private skill-training enterprises, companies and organizations. NSDC participates in government skill-training schemes and initiatives as a partner or project management unit to run official grant-based programs, and supports the central and state governments of India in implementing their skills development strategies. NSDC also develops appropriate models to enhance, support and coordinate upskilling initiatives in private sectors. According to its annual report, NSDC developed an effective network of training partners which includes 302 funded, 115 non-funded and 14 innovation partners as well as 39 operational Sector Skill Councils, and distributed 1453.70 Crore (around US$210 million) funding to the skills training programs through the partnership network.

== Schemes & Initiatives ==
- Pradhan Manthri Kaushal Vikas Yojana (PMKVY)
- Pradhan Manthri Kaushal Kendra
- India International Skill Centre (IISC) Network
- Technical Intern Training
- Seekho Aur Kamao
- Swades
- PM-VISHWAKARMA
