= Seacom Skills University =

Private university in Bolpur, West Bengal, India

- Motto: Expanding the Boundaries of Knowledge
- Type: Private university
- Established: 2014
- Academic affiliations: UGC; AICTE; BCI; PCI
- Chairman: Anish Chakraborty
- Chancellor: Nilima Chakraborty
- Vice-Chancellor: Dr. Prabir Mukhopadhyay
- Location: Bolpur, West Bengal, India; 23°42′05″N 87°38′24″E
- Campus: Suburbs
- Website: www.seacomskillsuniversity.org

Seacom Skills University (SSU) is a private university located in Bolpur, West Bengal, India enacted by The Seacom Skills University Act, 2014 (West Bengal Act VI of 2014) by the West Bengal Legislative Assembly.

== Academics ==
Seacom Skills University offers UG, PG, diploma, PhD courses in Engineering, Management, Legal Sciences, Agriculture & Hospitality etc. UG courses range from three-four years, PG for two years. The university is approved by UGC. Bachelor of pharmacy is best course offered in the university with good placement track record.
