= Adalaj =

- Town
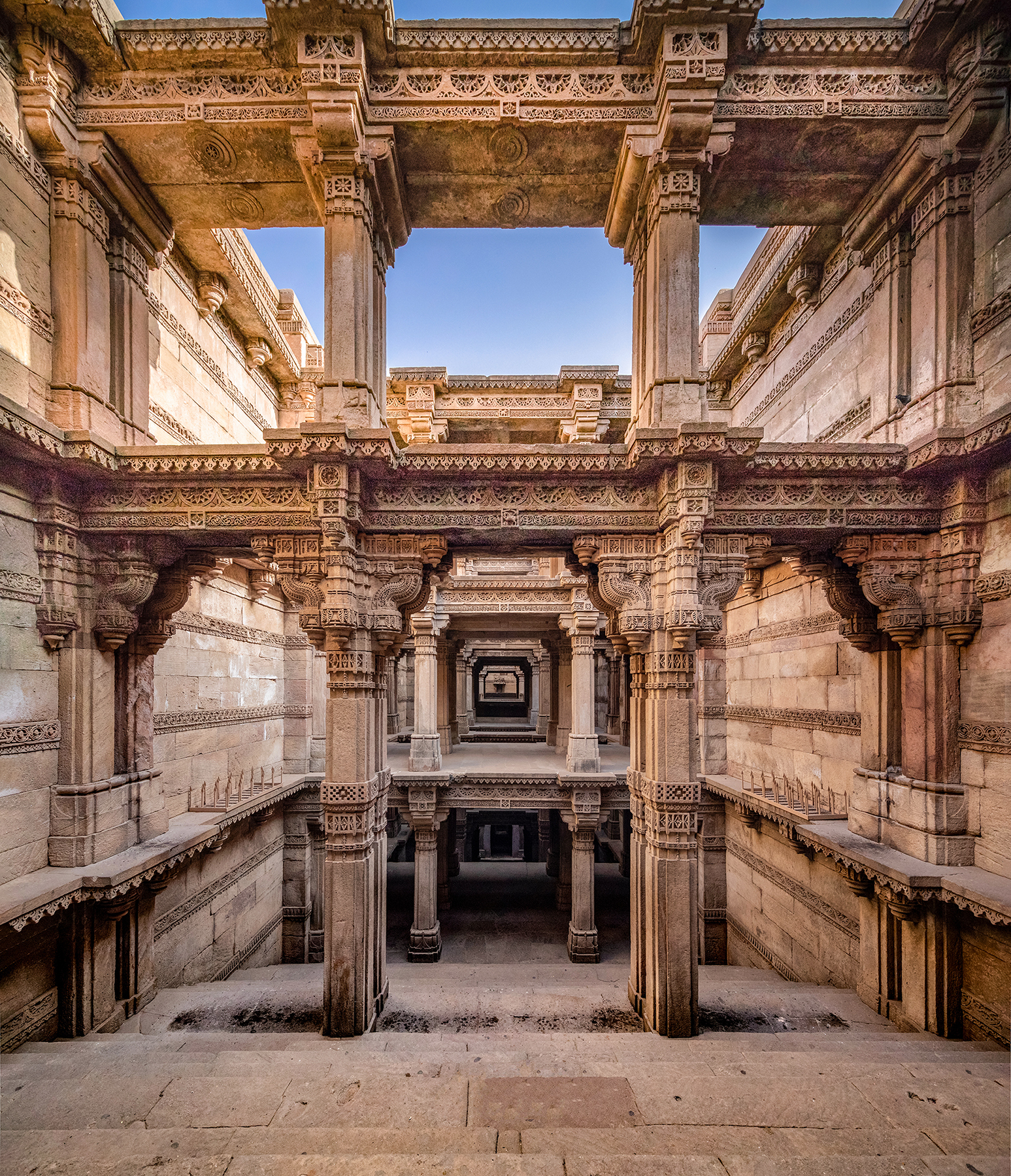
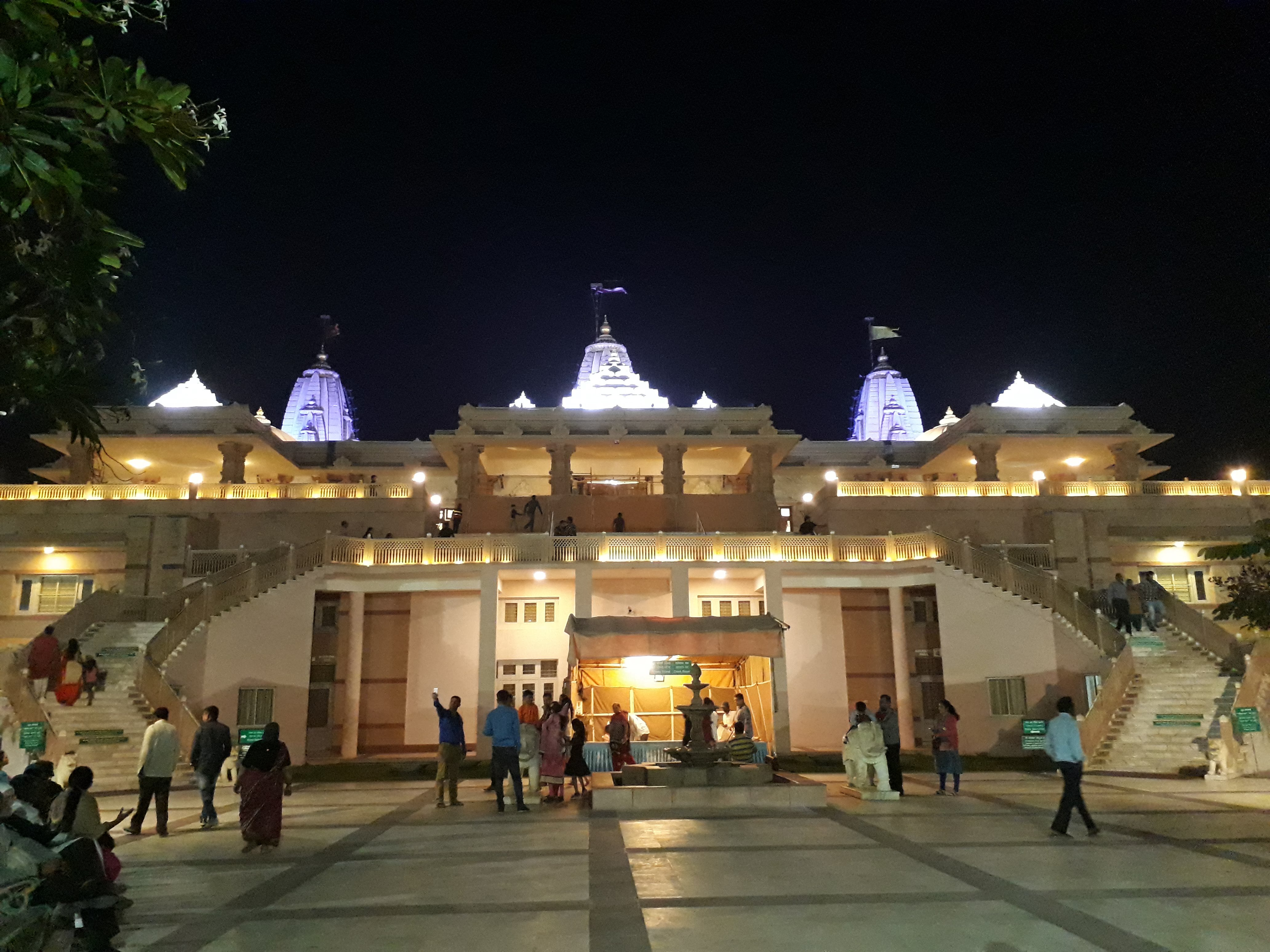
- Clockwise: Adalaj stepwell, a market, and Trimandir temple.
- Interactive map of Adalaj
- Location in Gujarat, India Adalaj (Gujarat) Adalaj (India)
- Coordinates: 23.17°N 72.58°E
- Country: India
- State: Gujarat
- District: Gandhinagar
- Taluka: Gandhinagar

Government
  - Type: Panchayat
  - Gram Panchayat: Kokilaben R Thakor

Area
  - Town: 17.91 km^{2} (6.92 sq mi)
  - Land: 17.91 km^{2} (6.92 sq mi)
  - Urban: 17.91 km^{2} (6.92 sq mi)
- Elevation: 66 m (217 ft)
- Highest elevation: 69 m (226 ft)
- Lowest elevation: 63 m (207 ft)

Population (2011)
  - Town: 11,957
  - Rank: 1,262
  - Density: 667.6/km^{2} (1,729/sq mi)

Languages
  - Official: Gujarati, Hindi
- Time zone: UTC+5:30 (IST)
- PIN: 382 421
- STD code: +91-2712
- Vehicle registration: GJ
- Website: Gandhinagar District Panchayat

Adalaj is a census town in Gandhinagar district in the western Indian state of Gujarat. With a population of roughly 12,000 residents within the town limits as of 2011, Adalaj is known for its semi-arid climate and its historic and religious establishments. The town sits in a generally flat area covering about 18 sq. km.

The city has seen recent rapid urbanization since the last census report.

== Geography ==
Adalaj is located at 23.17°N 72.58°E. It has an average elevation of 66 metres (217 ft). According to the Bureau of Indian Standards, the town falls under seismic zone 3, in a scale of 2 to 5 (in order of increasing vulnerability to earthquakes).

=== Climate ===
Adalaj has substantially similar climate to Ahmedabad which is a hot, semi-arid climate (Köppen climate classification: BSh), with marginally less rain than required for a tropical savanna climate. The Indian Meteorological Department does not distinguish Adalaj through a distinct weather station, therefore seasonal and monsoon conditions mimic recorded values of Ahmedabad.

There are three main seasons: summer, monsoon and winter. Aside from the monsoon season, the climate is extremely dry. The weather is hot from March to June. Cold northerly winds are responsible for a mild chill in January. The southwest monsoon brings a humid climate from mid-June to mid-September. The average annual rainfall is about 595 millimetres (23.4 in), and it is not uncommon for droughts to occur when the monsoon does not extend as far west as usual.

Climate data for Adalaj (1981–2010)
Month	Jan	Feb	Mar	Apr	May	Jun	Jul	Aug	Sep	Oct	Nov	Dec	Year
Mean daily maximum °C (°F)	28.2 (82.8)	31.9 (89.4)	36.7 (98.1)	40.9 (105.6)	42.5 (108.5)	39.2 (102.6)	33.3 (91.9)	31.6 (88.9)	33.0 (91.4)	35.3 (95.5)	32.5 (90.5)	29.1 (84.4)	34.5 (94.1)
Daily mean °C (°F)	20.2 (68.4)	22.5 (72.5)	27.6 (81.7)	31.7 (89.1)	34.3 (93.7)	33.1 (91.6)	29.7 (85.5)	28.5 (83.3)	29.2 (84.6)	28.5 (83.3)	24.8 (76.6)	21.4 (70.5)	27.6 (81.7)
Mean daily minimum °C (°F)	14.7 (58.5)	17.5 (63.5)	21.8 (71.2)	25.9 (78.6)	28.5 (83.3)	29.8 (85.6)	27.6 (81.7)	25.9 (78.6)	25.3 (77.5)	24.2 (75.6)	20.8 (69.4)	16.5 (61.7)	23.2 (73.8)
Average rainfall mm (inches)	1.0 (0.04)	1.0 (0.04)	2.0 (0.08)	1.0 (0.04)	1.0 (0.04)	57.0 (2.24)	187.0 (7.36)	232.0 (9.13)	92.0 (3.62)	10.0 (0.39)	11.0 (0.43)	0.0 (0.0)	595 (23.41)
Average rainy days	0.6	0.4	1.1	1.1	0.8	12.5	23.2	21.9	13.2	2.5	1.7	0.4	79.4
Average relative humidity (%)	37	29	24	25	33	49	70	77	70	42	37	34	44
Mean monthly sunshine hours	287.3	274.3	277.5	297.2	329.6	238.3	130.1	111.4	220.6	290.7	274.1	288.6	3,019.7
Average ultraviolet index	6	7	8	9	9	8	7	7	7	7	6	5	7
Source 1: India Meteorological Department
Source 2: NOAA (sun and humidity 1971–1990), Weather Atlas

== Demographics ==
Historical population
Year	Pop.	±%
1971	4,221	—
1981	7,291	+72.7%
1991	10,484	+43.8%
2001	9,774	−6.8%
2011	11,957	+22.3%

As of the 2011 India census, Adalaj had a population of 11,957.

=== Religion ===
Religions in Adalaj (2011)
Religion	Percent
Hinduism	94.86%
Islam	2.22%
Jainism	2.08%
Christianity	0.38%
Sikhism	0.17%
Other or not stated	0.29%

According to the 2011 census, Hindus are the predominant religious community in the city comprising 94.86% of the population followed by Muslims (2.22%) and Jains (2.08%). Christians, Sikhs, and those who didn't state any religion make up the remainder.

=== Languages ===
As of 2011, 88% of residents had Gujarati as a first language, while 10% had Hindi. The remaining 2% were split among several other Indic languages.

=== Literacy and Gender ===
Males constitute 51% of the population and females 49%. Adalaj has an average literacy rate of 61%, higher than the national average of 59.5%; with 59% of the males and 41% of females literate. 15% of the population is under 6 years of age.

== Civic administration ==
Adalaj is a census town, promoted in 2001 from village status, administered through the namesake gram panchayat, which itself is a combination of local areas, by the elected sarpanch and other members. This area is a part of the Gandhinagar taluka, one of four blocks, in the Gandhinagar district of Gujarat.

=== Central and state representation ===
Adalaj is part of Gandhinagar South Assembly constituency for representation in the Vidhan Sabha and one of the state legislative assembly constituencies that form the Ahmedabad East Lok Sabha constituency for representation in the Lok Sabha.

== Economy ==
As of 2001 the local economy's main manufactured and exported commodities were bricks, paddy, and pearl millet. Additionally, wheat, cotton, tobacco, castor, mustard seed, and consumed vegetables are grown in the generally agrarian based economy.

== Infrastructure ==
=== Public transport ===
==== Bus ====
Adalaj is served by several bus networks. Ahmedabad Municipal Transport Service, or AMTS, runs three lines into the town, all of which terminate at or around the Adalaj Trimandir. These routes are connections to long distance rail through Western Railways, the proposed bullet train service, and proposed Metro service at Kalupur Station; passenger air travel at Sardar Vallabhbhai Patel International Airport; and upscale full-service starred lodging near Iskcon Cross Road. Gujarat State Road Transport Corporation, or GSRTC, provides intercity and regional bus service through bus stops located at the northern corner of the cloverleaf interchange. Additionally, Ahmedabad BRTS is providing service to Trimandir.

=== Road ===
The town is primarily serviced by the east–west running Sarkhej–Gandhinagar Highway which forms a major part of NH 147 and the north–south running Gujarat State Highway 41, commonly referred to as Ahmedabad-Kalol Highway. The resulting cloverleaf interchange geographically located in town's center splits the neighborhoods.

These 8- and 10-lane surface highways have various uncontrolled crosswalks at high traffic areas, points of interest, and bus stations. Several smaller roads and alleys form the remaining paved transportation infrastructure.

=== Air ===
Informal helipads have been constructed by private parties, but no formal airfield exists within the ward boundaries. The closest commercial airport with regularly scheduled passenger flights is Sardar Vallabhbhai Patel International Airport, which is 15 to 20 kilometers' driving distance south of the town in Ahmedabad.

== Arts and culture ==
=== Tourist attractions ===
==== Adalaj Stepwell ====
The Adalaj Stepwell is situated 18 kilometres (11 mi) away from Gandhinagar in the heart of what historically has been known as Adalaj. Built in 1499 A.D. by Queen Rudabai, the stepwell, or vav, is intricately carved and five stories deep. The carvings on its walls and pillars include leaves, flowers, birds, fish, geometrical patterns, and other breathtaking ornamental designs. In the past, these step wells were frequented by travelers and caravans as stopovers along trade routes.

On entering through one of the three gates, visitors are greeted by a mandap with an eight-sided dome, which is now damaged. On both sides of the steps are balconies. Rows of carved elephants mark some of the levels.

==== Adalaj Trimandir ====
The Adalaj Trimandir is an expansive nonsectarian temple inspired by Dada Bhagwan opened 29 December 2002. The Trimandir is a two-storey structure with a discourse hall on the ground floor and temple on the first floor. The entire structure, with a centre shikhar height of 33 meters, is set with intricate carvings on pink sandstone.

The main hall of the temple measures 10,000 square feet (930 m^{2}). The centre sanctum houses a 3.9-meter idol of Simandhar Swami along with the idols of his Chandrayan Yaksh dev and Panchanguli Yakshini devi. Additionally, it houses idols of other Tirthankara and dev/devis. The left sanctum hosts Shivling, Parvati, Hanuman and Ganapati, whereas the right sanctum comprises Krishna, Tirupati Balaji Shreenathji, Bhadrakali mata and Amba mata. The two extreme ends of the temple houses Padmaprabhu and Sai Baba.

== See also ==
- Ahmedabad
