= Bharatiya Skill Development University =

Private skill university in Jaipur, India

Bhartiya Skill Development University
- Type: Private
- Established: 2017
- Affiliations: UGC, AIU
- Chairperson: Ursula Joshi
- President: Dr. Vivek Bhandari
- Location: Jaipur, Rajasthan, India
- Website: www.ruj-bsdu.in

Bhartiya Skill Development University (BSDU) is a private skill university located in Jaipur, India and enacted by The Bhartiya Skill Development University Jaipur Act, 2017 (Rajasthan Act No. 3 of 2017) of Rajasthan Legislative Assembly.
