= Medhavi Skills University, Sikkim =

University in Sikkim, India

Medhavi Skills University
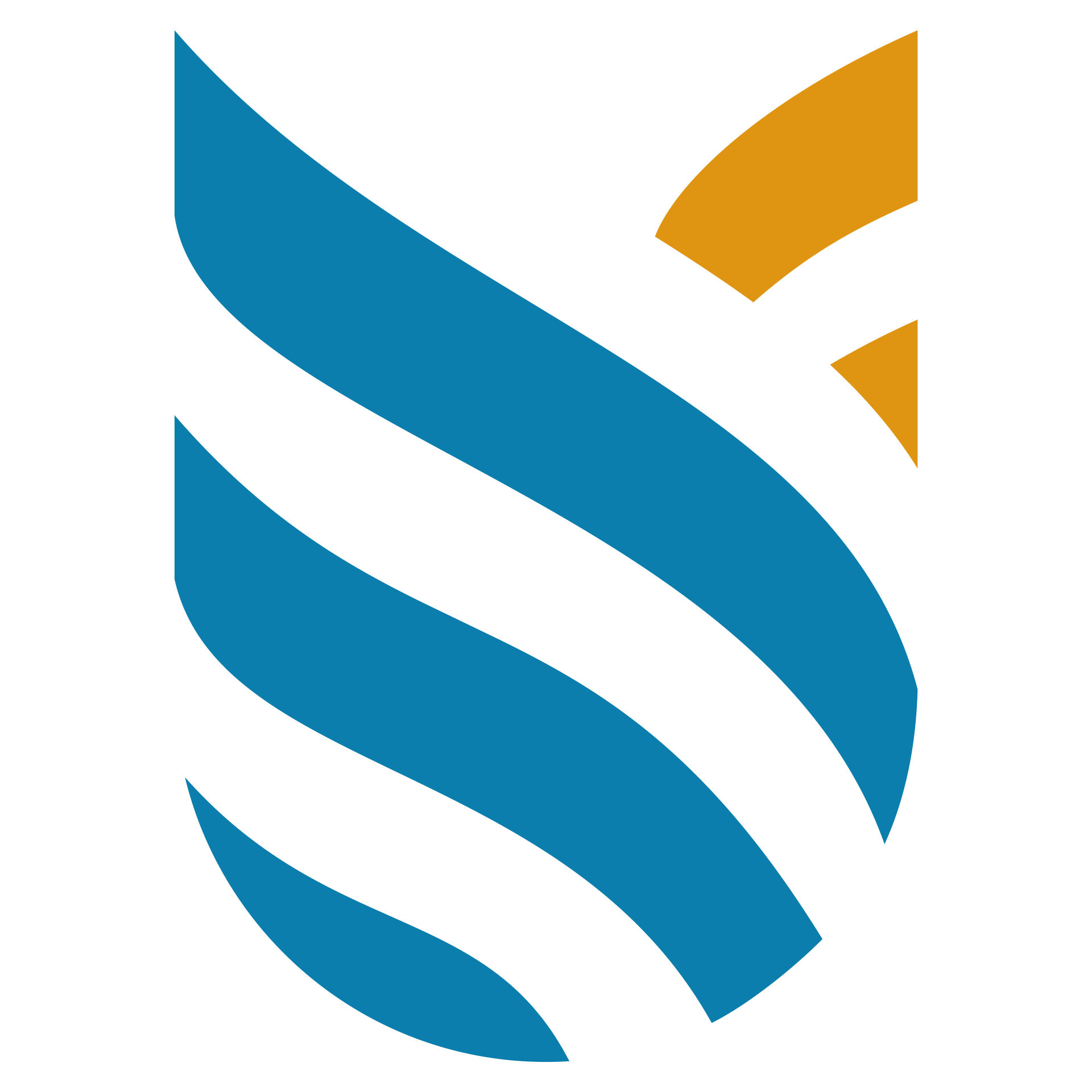
- Motto: Skill. Empower. Liberate
- Type: Private
- Established: 2021
- Affiliations: UGC, NCVET, DGT, NSDC, ISO 9001:2015, ISO 21001:2018
- Chancellor: Pravesh Dudani
- Vice-Chancellor: Dr. Amiya Singh
- Director: Kuldip Sarma
- Location: Bermoik, West Sikkim, Ratamatey Thangsing, Barnyak-Barthang GPU, / Topakhani, Lower Chisopani, Singtam Bazar, Singtam, Sikkim, 737134, India
- Website: https://www.msu.edu.in/
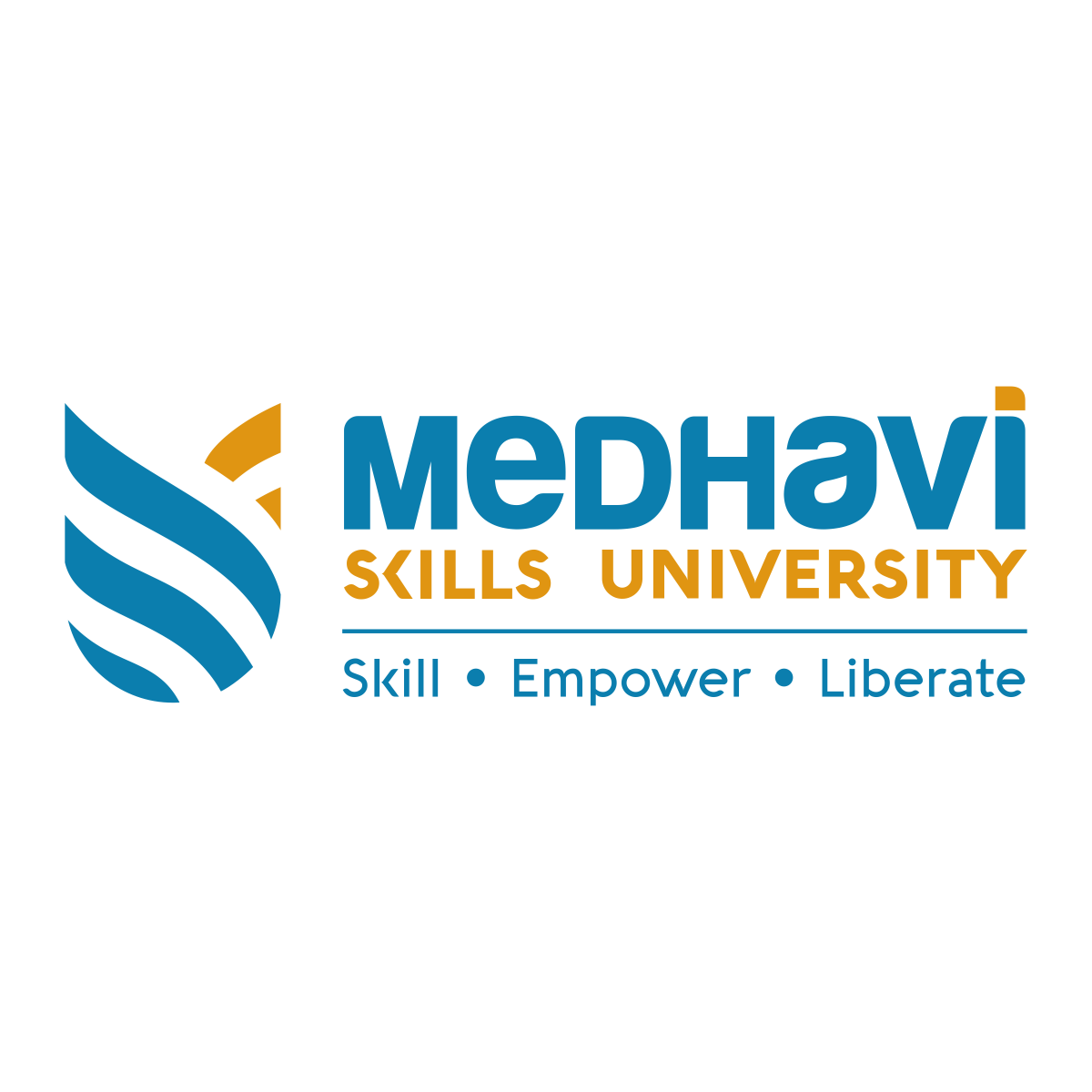

Medhavi Skills University, Sikkim is a private skill university with campuses located in both Singtam and Bermiok, Sikkim. Founded in 2021 under the auspices of the Medhavi Foundation, it aims to deliver skill-based and job-oriented academic programs to students. The university is recognized by the UGC, the National Council for Vocational Education and Training (NCVET), and the National Skill Development Corporation (NSDC).

The Bermiok campus, located at Ratamatey Thangsing, Barnyak-Barthang GPU, along with the Singtam campus, facilitates the university's vision by offering diverse educational programs and contributing significantly to the regional educational landscape.

== Courses and programs ==
Across both locations, Medhavi Skills University offers undergraduate and postgraduate programs in fields like business administration, computer applications, commerce, among others.
