= Tarsali =

Coordinates: 21°51′10″N 73°09′52″E

- town
- Interactive map of Tarsali
- Country: India
- State: Gujarat
- District: Vadodara

Population (2001)
  - Total: 26,709

Languages
  - Official: Gujarati, Hindi
- Time zone: UTC+5:30 (IST)

Tarsali is a census town in Vadodara district in the Indian state of Gujarat.

== Demographics ==
As of 2001 India census, Tarsali had a population of 26,709. Males constitute 53% of the population and females 47%. Tarsali has an average literacy rate of 79%, higher than the national average of 59.5%: male literacy is 83%, and female literacy is 75%. In Tarsali, 12% of the population is under 6 years of age.

Tarsali has become a developed area of Vadodara as of growing price in land and construction. However, many people from Tarsali areas own factories in Makarpura GIDC. Most Tarsali students go to New Era High School, Makarpura, Baroda High School ONGC, Bhavans ONGC.

Tarsali has a smaller community of Amin (upper class-Aryan caste system). The roots of community are from the village Darapura. So they relates to Amin' families of Darapura also. Tarsali Amin khadki consists of 35-40 families, also a family in nearby village Jambuva. They are descendants of Devidasbhai Zaverbhai Amin. Around 1805, Devidasbhai Amin was granted an estate in Tarsali by Gaekwar Maharaja of Baroda state. He was then shifted to Tarsali from Darapura, a village near Padara. He had three sons named Ramdasbhai Amin, Jagjivanbhai Amin and Manorbhai Amin. The present families are generations of these three brothers. Although in smaller numbers they are known for their dominance on tarsali in terms of leadership and overall influence. Many Amin's from Tarsali are settled down in Abroad and become millionaire & billionaire. Amin Khadki situated in the heart of Tarsali is recognized as an unofficial headquarters of tarsali. Furthermore, an elections of Municipal Corporation in 2010 & 2015 has resulted into the historic victory of Jaimin Amin as a Municipal Councillor, So far one of the youngest ever Municipal Councillor of Gujarat.

Tarsali has following major societies:

1. Damodar Nagar Society - 300 houses

2) Motinagar 1,2,3 - 1000 houses 3) Nandanvan Society - 100 houses 4) Sharad Nagar - 1351 houses 5) Vijay nagar - 1000+ houses 6) Shanti Nagar - 500+ houses 7) Ashok Park - 100+ houses 8)Ravi Park Society - 100+ houses 9) vishal Nagar -1251 houses 10) Ashish Park Society - 100+ houses 11) Reva Park - 100+ houses 12) OM NAGAR 13) Navneeth Park 14) Anand Sagar Society 15) Moti nagar 2 16) Ishwar Park - 112 houses 17) Kamla Park - 130 houses 18) The Gold City - 375 houses 19) Darshanam Pearl - 127 house (MT) And in tarsali sharad nagar is most popular for teachers resident.

Major land in Tarsali is occupied by defence and other government bodies like Industrial Training Institute (ITI), Indian Army, Vadodara Dairy, ONGC and Bhavans School. Tarsali is the birthplace of A.M Patel (Dada Bhagwan).
