= Simandhar =

Jain cosmology being

- Tīrthaṅkara
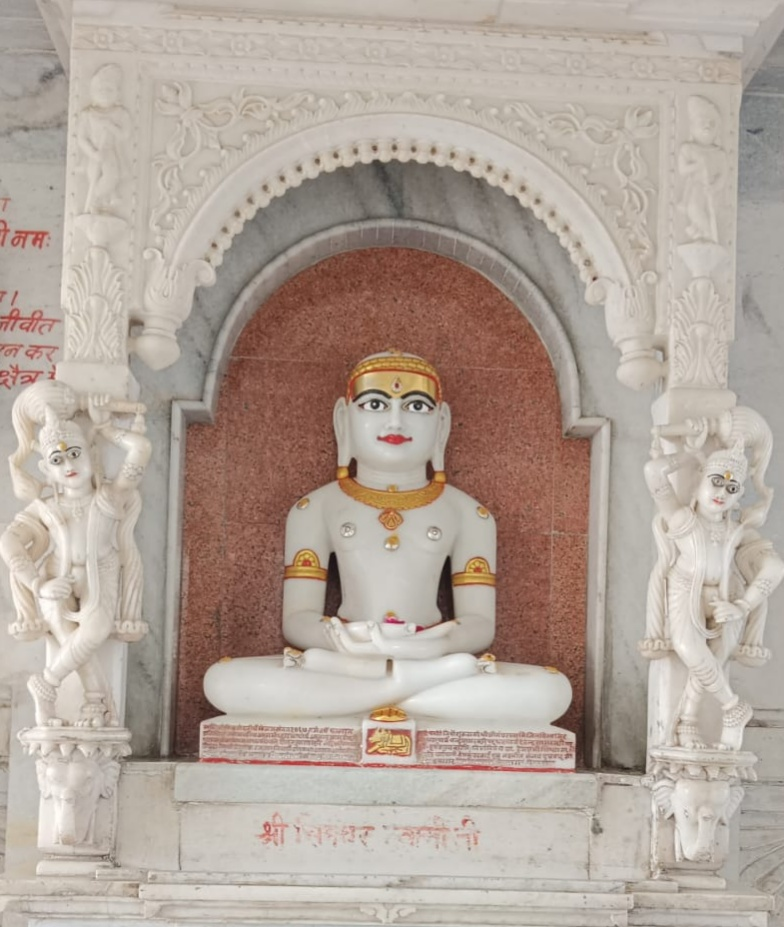
- Idol of Simandhar at Shri Bibrod Adinath Jain Shwetamber Tirth, Bibdod, Ratlam, Madhya Pradesh, India
- Other names: Helds being saint (Sanyam ni sima ne dhāran karnār)
- Predecessor: himself 1st
- Successor: Yugmandhar
- Mantra: Aum hrīṃ śrīṃ arham śrī sīmaṃdharasvāmine namaḥ hrīṃ svāhā
- Symbol: Bull
- Height: 500 Dhanush
- Age: 84 lac purv
- Color: Gold

Genealogy
- Parents: Shreyans (father); Satyaki (mother)
- Spouse: Rukamani

Simandhar or Simandhara is a Tīrthaṅkara, an arihant, who is said to be currently living in another world in the Jain cosmological universe.

== Residence in Jain cosmology ==
Simandhar resides at Mahavideh Kshetra, another land within the Jain cosmological universe (see Jain cosmology).

The five lands of the Bharat Kshetra are currently in the fifth Ara (a degraded time-cycle in which Tirthankaras do not take birth). The most recent Tirthankara present on Bharata Kshetra (present world) was Vardhamana Mahavira, whom historians estimate lived between 599 and 527 BCE, the last in a cycle of 24 Tirthankaras.

On Mahavideh Kshetra, the fourth Ara like (a spiritually elevated time-cycle) exists continuously. There, Tirthankaras perpetually are born. There are 5 Mahavideh Kshetras, each being a separate land. At present, there are 4 Tirthankaras residing in each Mahavideh Kshetra. Thus there are a total of 20 Tirthankaras residing there, Simandhar being one among them.

== Biography per Jain tradition ==
Simandhar is a living Tirthankara, an Arihant, who is said to be currently present on another world in the Jain cosmological universe. The Arihant Simandhar is believed to be currently 150,000 earth years old and has a remaining lifespan of 125,000 earth years. He lives in the city of Pundarikgiri, the capital of Pushpakalavati, one of 32 geographical divisions on Mahavideh Kshetra. Pundarikgiri is ruled by King Shreyans, who is Simandhar's father. His mother is Satyaki. While pregnant with Simandhar, Satyaki had a sequence of auspicious dreams indicating that she would give birth to a Tirthankara. Simandhar was born with three complete aspects of jnana, or self-knowledge:

- Mati Jnana (see Jain epistemology), knowledge of the 5-sense realm
- Shruta Jnana (see Jain epistemology), knowledge of all forms of communication
- Avadhi Jnana (see Jain epistemology), clairvoyant knowledge

As a young adult, he married Rukamani and then, later in life, took diksha, renunciation from worldly life.

Simandhar's height is 500 dhanushya, approximately 1,500 feet, which is considered an average height for the people of Mahavideh Kshetra.

== Worship ==
=== Iconography ===
Simandhara is usually depicted in a sitting or standing meditative posture with the symbol of a bull beneath him. Every Tīrthankara has a distinguishing emblem that allows worshippers to distinguish similar-looking idols of the Tirthankaras.

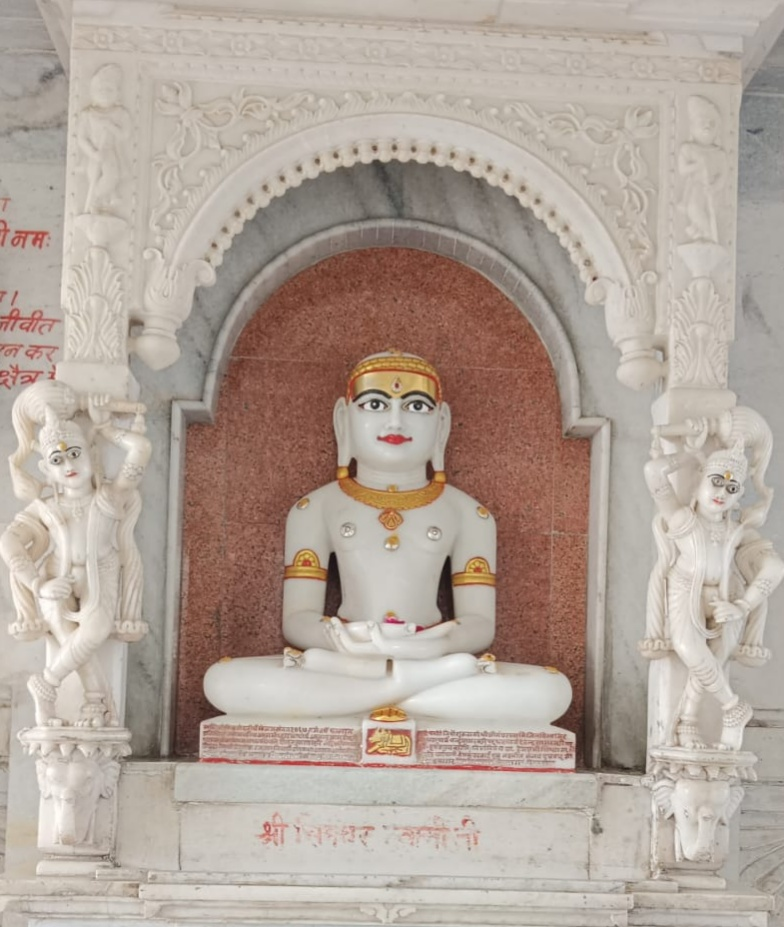
Idol of Simandhar at Shri Bibrod Adinath Jain Shwetamber Tirth, Bibdod, Ratlam, Madhya Pradesh, India

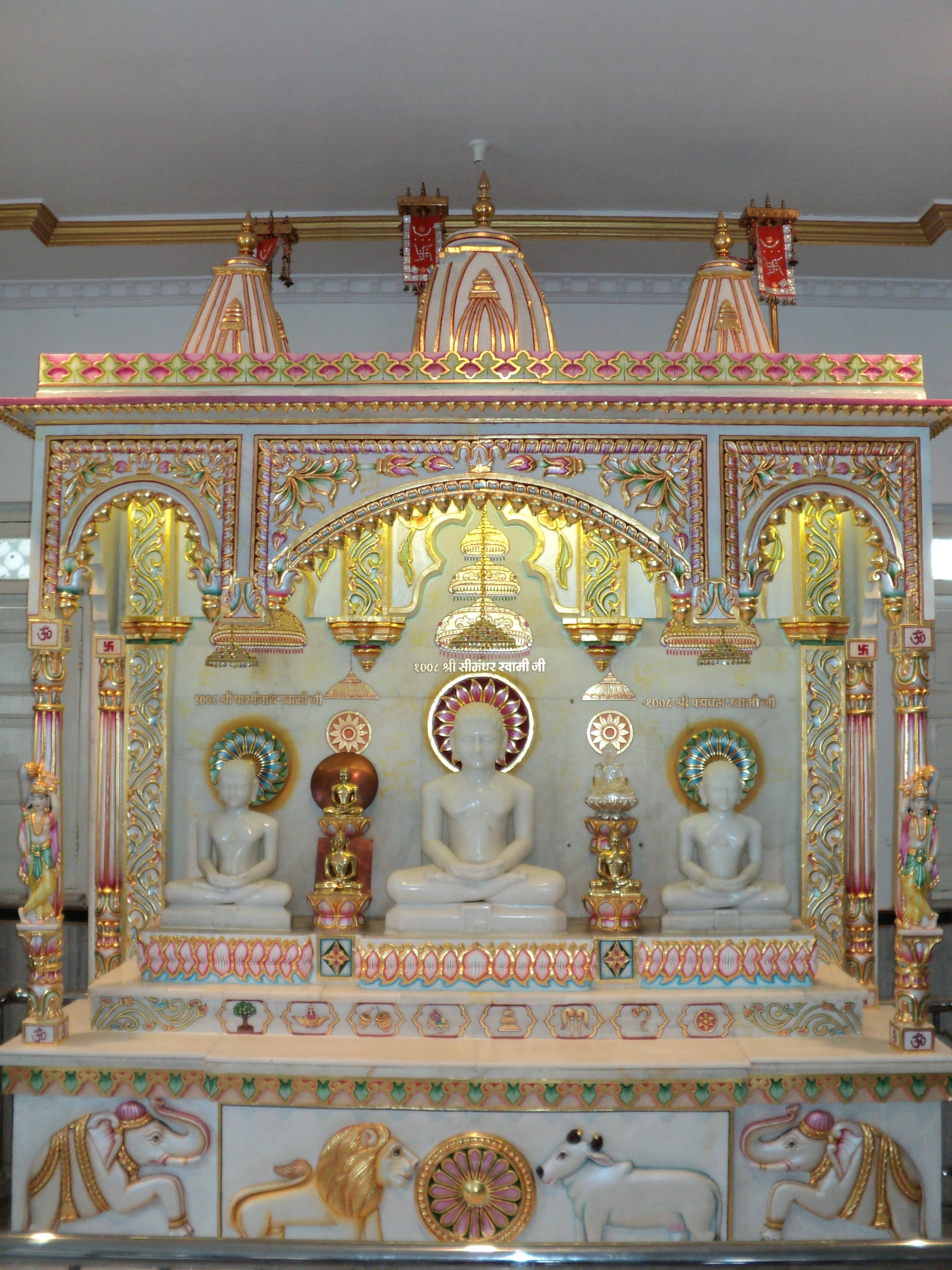
Simandhara in Digambar Jain temple, Ujjain

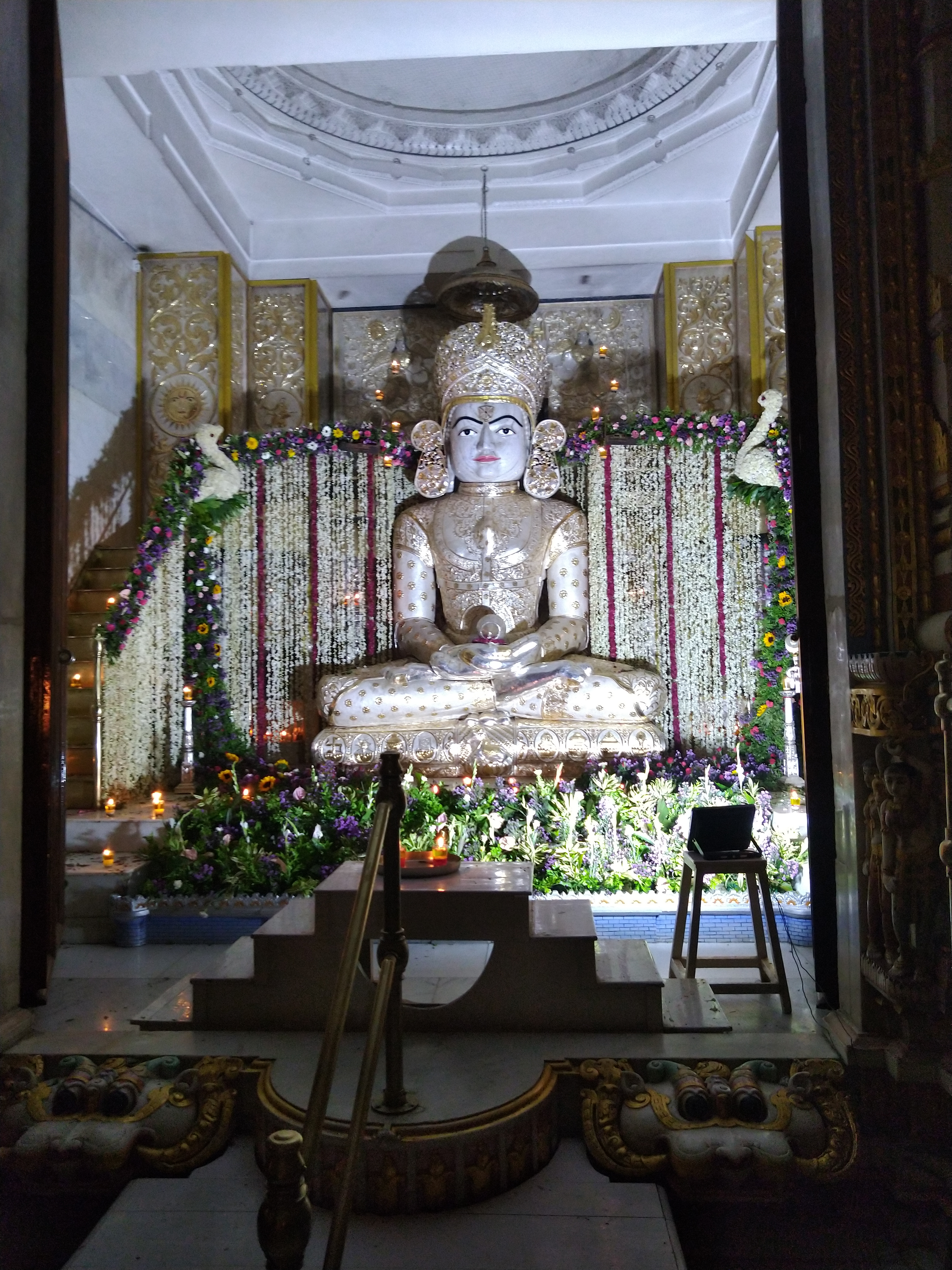
Simandhar Swamiat Simandhar Jain Temple, Mehsana

=== Main temples ===
- Shree Simandhar swami Śvetāmbara Jain Temple, Katargam, Surat
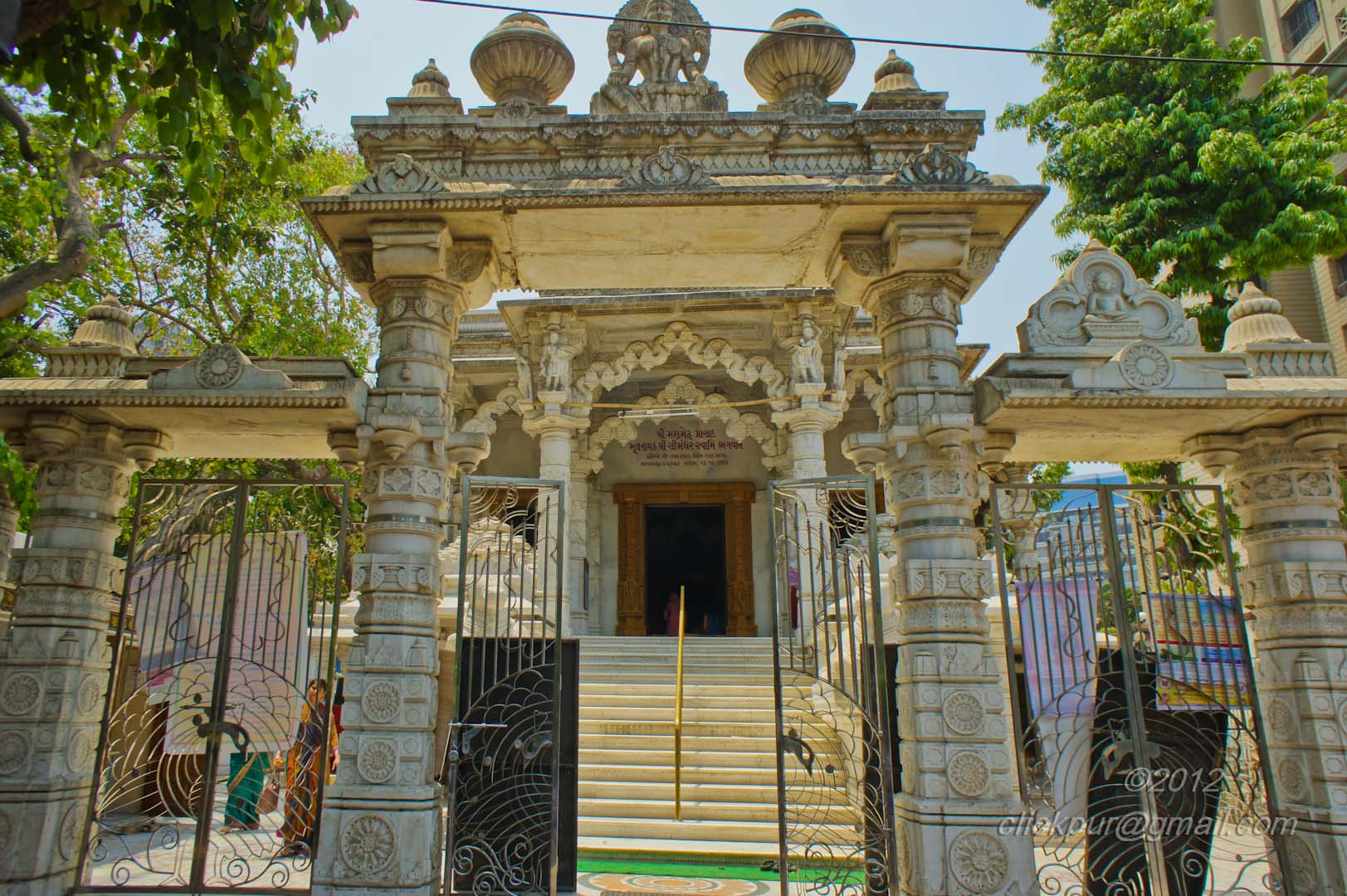
Simandhara Swami Derasar at Parel, Mumbai

== See also ==
- Shantinatha
- Kunthunatha
